= List of Asian superheroes =

This is a list of Asian superheroes.

== Central Asian ==
=== Kazakhstan ===
==== Film ====
- Khan from Guardians

== East Asian ==
=== Chinese ===
==== Comics ====
===== Marvel Comics =====
- Aero
- Auric, member of Gamma Flight
- Black Widow (Monica Chang)
- Blink
- Collective Man
- Jubilee
- Leonara Eng, a mutant introduced in Age of X-Man
- Lin Lie, also known as Sword Master and Iron Fist
- Lin Sun, member of the Sons of the Tiger
- Push, supporting character from the Spider-Girl comic book series (Marvel Comics)
- Nature Girl (currently Armageddon Girl)
- Radioactive Man
- Red Lotus
- Shang-Chi
- Shen Kuei (a.k.a. The Cat)
- Silver, member of Gamma Flight
- Sister Dagger, half sister of Shang-Chi
- Sister Staff, half sister of Shang-Chi
- Sprite (Jia Jing)
- Wong, sidekick to Doctor Strange
- Jimmy Woo
- Xorn, member of the X-Men

===== DC Comics =====
- Grace Choi, member of the Outsiders
- Ryan Choi, one of the Atoms.
- Claw, member of Primal Force
- Dragonmage, member of the Legion of Super-Heroes
- Gloss, member of the New Guardians
- Great Ten
- Grunge, member of Gen 13
- I Ching
- Jade (Jade Yifei)
- Green Lantern (Kai-Ro) from the Batman Beyond animated series
- Kwai, member of the Blood Syndicate
- Lady Shiva
- Monkey Prince
- New Super-Man
- Stuff the Chinatown Kid, member of the Seven Soldiers of Victory
- Swift, member of The Authority
- Wing, member of the Seven Soldiers of Victory

===== Valiant Comics =====
- Dr. Mirage

===== Others =====
- The Green Turtle, first Asian American superhero
- Burma Boy, sidekick to Green Turtle

==== Film and television ====
- Kato from the Green Hornet
- Balala the Fairies
- Inframan

===== Power Rangers =====
- Cassie Chan, the second Pink Turbo and Pink Space Ranger
- Kai Chen, the Blue Galaxy Ranger from Power Rangers Lost Galaxy
- Gem, designated as Ranger Gold from Power Rangers RPM
- Gemma, designated as Ranger Silver from Power Rangers RPM

=== Hongkonger ===
- Atom (Ryan Choi) (DC Comics) (Note: Choi was born in 1983 in British Hong Kong.)
- Black Mask, a character from the manhua Black Mask (Chinese: 黑俠; Jyutping: Hak^{1}-haap^{6}; lit. 'Black Knight'), created by the artist Li Chi-Tak. He is the protagonist of a film series that received two movies: Black Mask (1996), starring Jet Li, and Black Mask 2: City of Masks (2002), starring Andy On
- Green Hornet (Dong), character from the 1994 film The Green Hornet, a homage to the Green Hornet and Kato
- The Excreman, a character from the 1996 Hong Kong manhua Yellow Bus and the upcoming film The Excreman — On the Road
- Sway, member of the X-Men (Marvel Comics)
- Striker Z, member of the Power Company (Marvel Comics)

=== Japanese ===
==== Comics ====
===== Marvel Comics =====
- Armor from the X-Men
- Big Hero 6
  - GoGo Tomago
- Deathdream (Hotoru), member of the Outliers
- Gwenny Lou Sabuki / Golden Girl, member of the Invaders
- Hazmat from the Avengers Academy
- Jolt, member of the Thunderbolts
- Karasu and Sojobo-Tengu, twin mutants from X-Men
- Kid Kaiju
- Kwannon, member of the X-Men
- Master Izo, ally of Daredevil
- Taki Matsuya, member of the X-Terminators
- Jim Morita, member of Nick Fury's Howling Commandos
- Nico Minoru (formerly Sister Grimm) of the Runaways
- Peni Parker
- Radiance, member of the All-New Invaders
- Sakura Spider
- Shamara Tako, Dragon Lord
- Shinchuko Lotus, member of the Sons of the Tiger
- Silver Samurai
- Sunfire
  - Mariko Yashida as Sunfire in Exiles
- Sunpyre
- Surge, member of the X-Men
- Takuya Yamashiro/Spider-Man/Supaidaman
- Spider Man/Yu Komori (manga)
- Taki
- Turbo from the New Warriors
- Yukio, ninja ally of the X-Men

===== DC Comics =====
- Big Science Action
- Bushido, member of the Teen Titans
- Blitzen, member of the Shadow Cabinet
- Doctor Light (Kimiyo Hoshi)
- Eiko Hasigawa, Catwoman
- Fuji, member of Stormwatch
- Katana, member of the Outsiders
- Kayo, member of Brigade
- Kunoichi
- Musashi, member of the Cadre of the Immortal
- Naiad
- Ram, member of the New Guardians
- Rising Sun, member of the Global Guardians
- Samurai from the Super Friends animated series
- Sunburst
- Super Young Team
- Toyman (Hiro Okamura)
- Tsunami, member of the Young All-Stars

===== Manga =====
- 009-1
- Akakage
- Ambassador Magma
- Tetsuwan Atom/Mighy Atom/Astro Boy
  - Uran/Astro Girl
  - Cobalt/Jetto
- Baoh
- Barom-1
- Cutie Honey
- Cyborg 009
- Devilman
- Eight Man
- Esper Mami
- Gesicht
- Giant Robo
- Goku and the Z-Warriors from Dragon Ball Z
- Hentai Kamen
- Heroman, created by Stan Lee and Bones Inc
- Izuku Midoriya (My Hero Academia) and the Heroes of BNHA
- Kamen Teacher
- Kinnikuman
- Magical Girl Spec-Ops Asuka
- Mazinger Z
- Microsuperman / Microid Z
- Saitama (One Punch Man) and the Hero Association
- Perman, manga about grade school superheroes
- Ratman
- Sailor Moon and the Sailor Guardians
- Shadow Lady
- Spawn (Ken Kurosawa)
- Super HxEros
- Wedding Peach
- Wing-Man
- Zetman

===== Other =====
- Anpanman
- Ben Daimio (Dark Horse Comics)
- Kabuki (Dark Horse Comics)
- Karai (Teenage Mutant Ninja Turtles)
- Nakiko Akane from the Dreamwave comic book series Darkminds

==== Videogames ====
- Bomb Jack
- Bravoman
- Gunslinger Stratos
- Viewtiful Joe
- Wonderful 101

==== Film & Television ====
- Concrete Revolutio: Superhuman Phantasmagoria
- K.O. Beast
- Pretty Cure
- Tekkaman Blade (Not to be confused with Tekkanman)
- Tiger & Bunny
- Ultimate Girls (anime series)
- Karas
- Witchblade (2006 anime adaptation)
- Hell Girl
- Sailor Victory (not related to Sailor Moon or the Sailor Guardians)
- Samurai Flamenco
- The Reflection's chosen individuals
- Mamachan from Sign Gene
- Masaru Daisato, the protagonist from the 2007 Japanese film Big Man Japan
- Nakamura Hiro of the NBC TV series Heroes
- Samurai Jack, protagonist of the Cartoon Network/Toonami animated series
- Idol × Warrior Miracle Tunes! (Girls × Heroine Series)
- Magical × Heroine Magimajo Pures! (Girls × Heroine Series)
- Secret × Heroine Phantomirage! (Girls × Heroine Series)
- Police × Heroine Lovepatrina! (Girls × Heroine Series)
- Jetter Mars
- Casshan/Casshern
- Luna Kozuki
- Hurricane Polymar
- Tekkaman: The Space Knight (Not to be confused with Tekkanman Blade)
- Science Ninja Team Gatchaman (Used as a basis for Chojin Sentai Jetman)
- Campus Special Investigator Hikaruon (A homage to the Metal Hero Series, specifically the Space Sheriffs)

===== Metal Hero Series =====
- B-Fighter Kabuto
- Blue SWAT
- Special Rescue Exceedraft
- Heavy Shell B-Fighter
- Kabutack
- MegaBeast Investigator Juspion
- The Mobile Cop Jiban
- Robotack
- Space Sheriff Gavan
- Space Sheriff Shaider
- Space Sheriff Sharivan
- Special Investigation Robot Janperson
- Special Rescue Police Winspector
- Superhuman-Machine Metalder
- Super Rescue Solbrain
- Time-Space Warrior Spielban
- World Ninja War Jiraiya

===== Super Sentai =====
- Himitsu Sentai Gorenger (Super Sentai Series)
- JAKQ Dengekitai (Super Sentai Series)
- Battle Fever J (Super Sentai Series, excluding Miss America I)
- Denshi Sentai Denziman (Super Sentai Series)
- Taiyou Sentai Sun Vulcan (Super Sentai Series)
- Dai Sentai Goggle V (Super Sentai Series)
- Kagaku Sentai Dynaman (Super Sentai Series)
- Choudenshi Bioman (Super Sentai Series)
- Dengeki Sentai Changeman (Super Sentai Series)
- Choushinsei Flashman (Super Sentai Series)
- Hikari Sentai Maskman (Super Sentai Series)
- Choujuu Sentai Liveman (Super Sentai Series)
- Kousoku Sentai Turboranger (Super Sentai Series)
- Chikyuu Sentai Fiveman (Super Sentai Series)
- Chojin Sentai Jetman (Super Sentai Series)
- Kyoryu Sentai Zyuranger (Super Sentai Series)
- Gosei Sentai Dairanger (Super Sentai Series)
- Ninja Sentai Kakuranger (Super Sentai Series)
- Chouriki Sentai Ohranger (Super Sentai Series)
- Gekisou Sentai Carranger (Super Sentai Series)
- Denji Sentai Megaranger (Super Sentai Series)
- Seijuu Sentai Gingaman (Super Sentai Series)
- Kyukyu Sentai GoGoV (Super Sentai Series)
- Mirai Sentai Timeranger (Super Sentai Series)
- Hyakujuu Sentai Gaoranger (Super Sentai Series)
- Ninpuu Sentai Hurricanger (Super Sentai Series)
- Bakuryu Sentai Abaranger (Super Sentai Series)
- Tokusou Sentai Dekaranger (Super Sentai Series)
- Mahou Sentai Magiranger (Super Sentai Series)
- Gogo Sentai Boukenger (Super Sentai Series)
- Juken Sentai Gekiranger (Super Sentai Series)
- Engine Sentai Go-Onger (Super Sentai Series)
- Samurai Sentai Shinkenger (Super Sentai Series)
- Tensou Sentai Goseiger (Super Sentai Series)
- Kaizoku Sentai Gokaiger (Super Sentai Series)
- Tokumei/Dobutsu Sentai Go-Busters (Super Sentai Series)
- Zyuden Sentai Kyoryuger (Super Sentai Series)
- Ressha Sentai ToQger (Super Sentai Series)
- Shuriken Sentai Ninninger (Super Sentai Series)
- Doubutsu Sentai Zyuohger (Super Sentai Series)
- Uchu Sentai Kyuranger (Super Sentai Series)
- Kaitou Sentai Lupinranger VS Keisatsu Sentai Patranger (Super Sentai Series)
- Kishiryu Sentai Ryusoulger (Super Sentai Series)
- Mashin Sentai Kiramager (Super Sentai Series)
- Kikai Sentai Zenkaiger (Super Sentai Series)
- Avataro Sentai Donbrothers (Super Sentai Series)
- Hikonin Sentai Akibaranger (Unofficial Super Sentai Series)

===== Tokusatsu =====
- Silver Kamen
- Die Silbermaske
- Fireman
- Android Kikaider
- Kikaider 01
- Kikaider Reboot
- Android Kikaider (anime)
- Inazuman
- Moonlight Mask
- Seven Color Mask
- Prince of Space
- National Kid
- Iron Sharp/Space Chief from Uchuu Kaisokusen
- Captain Ultra
- Henshin Ninja Arashi
- Robot Detective
- Condorman
- Akumaizer 3
- Space Ironman Kyodain
- The Kagestar
- Ninja Captor, once confused to be part of the Super Sentai Series; Currently stands on its own
- Chojin Bibyun (Sequel to Akumaizer 3)
- Kaiketsu Zubat
- Daitetsujin 17 (Read as One Seven)
- Nebula Mask Machineman
- Brother Fist Byclosser
- Masked Beauty Patrine
- Lady Battle Cop
- Super Shining Soldier Changéríon
- Madan Senki Ryukendo (Created by Tomy, considered the zeroeth entry of the Tomica Hero Series)
- Tomica Hero Rescue Force (Tomica Hero Series)
- Tomica Hero Rescue Fire (Tomica Hero Series)
- Battle Hawk
- The Garo Franchise and Series
- Super Robot Red Baron
- Super Robot Mach Baron
- Ganbaron
- Aztekaiser
- Dinosaur War Izenborg
- Dinosaur Corps Koseidon
- Gridman the Hyper Agent
- SSSS.Gridman
- Godman
- Greenman
- Warrior of Love Rainbowman
- Ryūsei Ningen Zone/Zone Fighter
- Kure Kure Takora
- Enban Sensō Bankid
- Megaloman
- Computer Police Cybercop
- Shichisei Toshin Guyferd
- Chouseishin Gransazer (Chouseishin Series)
- Genseishin Justirisers (Chouseishin Series)
- Chousei Kantai Sazer-X (Chouseishin Series)
- Spectreman
- Kaiketsu Lion-Maru
- Fuun Lion-Maru
- Lion-Maru G
- Tetsujin Tiger Seven
- Denjin Zaborger
- Karate-Robo Zaborgar
- Super Giant, first superhero in celluloids and a year earlier than Gekko Kamen/Moonlight Mask
- Specter
- Human No. 1, and No. 2 from Assault! Human!!
- Iron King
- Jikuu Keisatsu Wecker Series
- Rosetta: The Masked Angel
- Shougeki Gouraigan
- Dogoo Girl Series
- Vanny Knights
- Voicelugger
- Jumborg Ace
- K-tai Investigator 7
- Kami no Kiba: Jinga, spinoff of the Garo Series
- Zero: Black Blood, another spinoff of the Garo Series
- Zero: Dragon Blood, second part to Zero: Black Blood
- Karakuri Samurai Sesshaawan 1
- Mighty Jack
- Mirrorman
- Bio Booster Armor Guyver
- Fūma no Kojirō
- Ryujin Mabuyer
- Socialite Belle Panchanne: The Wife Is a Superheroine!
- Star Wolf
- Tekkōki Mikazuki
- Thunder Mask
- X-Bomber
- Legend Hero Samgugjeon
- Bouken Rockbat
- Iria: Zeiram
- Majin Hunter Mitsurugi
- Cho Ninjatai Inazuma
- Daimajin
- UFO Daisensou: Tatakae! Red Tiger
- The Toei Fushigi Comedy Series

==== Other ====
- Ōgon Bat, first Asian superhero, and one of the first superheroes in general
- Prince of Gamma, second Asian superhero, and one of the first superheroes in general

===== Ultraman =====
- Ultraman (Ultra Series)
- Zoffy (Ultra Series)
- Ultraseven (Ultra Series)
- Ultraseven's Successor (Ultra Series)
- Ultraman Jack (Ultra Series)
- Ultraman Ace (Ultra Series)
- Father of Ultra (Ultra Series)
- Ultraman Taro (Ultra Series)
- Mother of Ultra (Ultra Series)
- Ultraman Leo (Ultra Series)
- Astra (Ultra Series)
- Ultraman King (Ultra Series)
- Ultraman Joneus (Ultra Series)
- Ultraman 80 (Ultra Series)
- Yullian (Ultra Series)
- Giant of Light (Ultra Series)
- Ultraman Great (Ultra Series)
- Ultraman Powered (Ultra Series)
- Ultraman Zearth (Ultra Series)
- Ultraman Tiga (Ultra Series)
- Ultraman Dyna (Ultra Series)
- Ultraman Gaia (Ultra Series)
- Ultraman Agul (Ultra Series)
- Ultraman Nice (Ultra Series)
- Ultraman Neos (Ultra Series)
- Ultraseven 21 (Ultra Series)
- Ultraman Cosmos (Ultra Series)
- Ultraman Justice (Ultra Series)
- Ultraman Legend (Ultra Series)
- Ultraman Nexus (Ultra Series)
- Ultraman Noa (Ultra Series)
- Ultraman Max (Ultra Series)
- Ultraman Xenon (Ultraman Xenon)
- Ultraman Mebius (Ultra Series)
- Ultraman Hikari (Ultra Series)
- Reimon (Ultra Series)
- Ultraman Ginga (Ultra Series)
- Jean-nine (Ultra Series)
- Ultraman Victory (Ultra Series)
- Ultraman Ginga Victory (Ultra Series)
- Ultraman X (Ultra Series)
- Ultraman Orb (Ultra Series)
- Ultraman Geed (Ultra Series)
- Ultraman Zero (Ultra Series)
- Ultraman Rosso (Ultra Series)
- Ultraman Blu (Ultra Series)
- Ultraman Reube (Ultra Series)
- Ultraman Grigio (Ultra Series)
- Ultraman Greube (Ultra Series)
- Ultraman Taiga/Titus/Fuma/Reiga (Ultra Series)
- Ultraman Ribut (Ultra Series)
- Ultraman Z (Ultra Series)
- Ultraman Trigger (Ultra Series)
- Ultraman Decker (Ultra Series)
- Jigglus Juggler (Ultra Series)
- Ultraman The Next (Ultra Series)
- Ultraman Saga (Ultra Series)
- Andro Melos
- Heisei Ultraseven

==== Kamen Rider ====
- Aso Masaru/Kamen Rider ZO
- Godai Yusuke/Kamen Rider Kuuga
- Hidaka Hitoshi/Kamen Rider Hibiki
- Hidari Shoutarou/Kamen Rider Joker, Phillip (Sonozaki Raito)/Kamen Rider Cyclone, Shoutaro-Phillip/Kamen Rider Double
- Hino Eiji/Kamen Rider OOO
- Hōjō Emu/Kamen Rider Ex-Aid
- Hongo Takeshi/Kamen Rider #1
- Igarashi Ikki + Vice/Kamen Rider Revice
- Inui Takumi/Kamen Rider Faiz
- Ishimonji Hayato/Kamen Rider #2
- Jin Keisuke/Kamen Rider X
- Jo Shigeru/Kamen Rider Stronger
- Kazamatsuri Shin/Kamen Rider Shin
- Kazuraba Kota/Kamen Rider Gaim
- Kazami Shiro/Kamen Rider V3
- Kenzaki Kazuma/Kamen Rider Blade
- Kido Shinji/Kamen Rider Ryuki
- Kiryū Sento/Kamen Rider Build
- Kisaragi Gentarou/Kamen Rider Fourze
- Kodoya Tsukasa/Kamen Rider Decade
- Kurenai Wataru/Kamen Rider Kiva
- Minami Kotarou/Kamen Rider Black/Black RX
- Murasame Ryo/Kamen Rider ZX
- Nogami Ryotarou/Kamen Rider Den-O Plat Form
- Oki Kazuya/Kamen Rider Super-1
- Segawa Kouji/Kamen Rider J
- Shouichi Tsugami/Kamen Rider Agito
- Soma Haruto/Kamen Rider Wizard
- Tendou Shouji/Kamen Rider Kabuto
- Tenkūji Takeru/Kamen Rider Ghost
- Tokiwa Sougo/Kamen Rider Zi-O
- Tomari Shinnosuke/Kamen Rider Drive
- Aruto Hiden/Kamen Rider Zero-One
- Touma Kamiyama/Kamen Rider Saber
- Tsukuba Hiroshi/Skyrider
- Ukiyo Ace/Kamen Rider Geats
- Yamamoto Daisuke/Kamen Rider Amazon
- Yuki Joji/Riderman

=== Mongolian ===
- Robin (Gan) from Batman: Beyond the White Knight

=== Taiwanese ===
- Pandamen from the Pandamen
- Space Warriors from the 1984 Taiwanese series Space Warriors
- Shadow Shell from Marvel: Future Fight (Marvel Comics)
- Thunderlord, member of the Global Guardians (DC Comics)

=== Korean ===
- Adam Park from the Power Rangers universe
- Amadeus Cho (Marvel Comics)
- Ballistic, member of the Blood Pack
- Chance from Fallen Angels
- Dragonson (Ahn Kwang-Jo), member of Justice League of China
- Element Woman
- Eugene Choi (DC Comics)
- Kid Juggernaut (Marvel Comics)
- Luna Snow (Marvel Comics)
- Mystek, member of Justice League Task Force
- Ray (Lucien Gates)
- Seok-hun from Psychokinesis
- Seoul from Bloodpool
- Silk (Marvel Comics)
- Third Rail, member of the Blood Syndicate
- Xombi
- Taegukgi (Marvel Comics)
- White Fox (Marvel Comics)
- Raiden Yoon (Marvel Comics)
- Huntrix, K-pop girl group from KPop Demon Hunters

== South Asian ==
=== Afghan ===
- Dust (Marvel Comics)
- Flambae (Dispatch)

=== Bangladeshi ===
- Enigma/Tara Virango (superhero in Marvel Comics)
- Ikaras (science fiction superhero novel written by Muhammed Zafar Iqbal)
- Joom (Dhaka Comics)
- Machine man (from the Bangladeshi film Machine Man)
- Lungiman (parody/comedy character from Dhaka comics)
- Montpellier from DC Comics
- Naar - Bangladeshi hero created by Khaled Nur
- Ibrahim (Dhaka Comics)
- Rishad (Dhaka Comics)
- Bizli (from Bangladeshi film Bizli)
- Electric Man (Bikash present comics)
- Titaness (FAB Comics)

=== Indian ===
- Ajooba
- Aryamaan – Brahmaand Ka Yodha
- Aruna from DC Comics
- Astra Force
- Athisayan
- Baalveer
- Baji
- Bantul the Great
- Bhavesh Joshi Superhero
- Bheriya
- Bhokal
- Captain Vyom
- Celsius
- Chakra: The Invincible, Indian superhero created by Stan Lee for Liquid Comics
- Chandra (Yakshi) from Lokah Chapter 1: Chandra
- Charlie (Odiyan) from Lokah Chapter 1: Chandra
- Chitti from Enthiran and 2.0 (film)
- Dabung Girl
- Devi from Virgin Comics/Liquid Comic
- Dharma (DC Comics)
- Dinesh Deol
- Doga
- Drona
- Flying Jatt
- G.One from Ra.One
- Hanu-Man
- Hero from Hero - Bhakti Hi Shakti Hai
- Hunterwali
- Indra (Marvel Comics)
- Inspector Steel
- Junior G
- Kanthaswamy
- Karima Shapandar (Marvel Comics)
- Karma
- Krrish
- Mr. Superman
- Maharakshak Aryan
- Mask
- Maya (DC Comics)
- Micheal (Chathan) from Lokah Chapter 1: Chandra
- Mighty Raju
- Minnal Murali
- Mr. India
- Mr. X
- Mugamoodi
- Nagraj
- Parmanu
- Purple Flame
- Raja from Superman (1980)
- Rama (DC Comics)
- Giant Man (Raz Malhotra) from Marvel Comics
- Plus, member of the Shadow Cabinet
- Shakti
- Shakti Haddad from Marvel Comics
- Shaktimaan
- Shiva from Shiva Ka Insaaf
- Solstice (DC Comics)
- Spider-Man: India
- Super Commando Dhruva
- Super Indian
- Supremo
- SuperAvni
- Super Singh
- The Sadhu
- Thunderbird (Neal Shaara), member of the X-Men
- Timeslip, member of the New Warriors
- Tiranga from Raj Comics
- Toofan
- Trinary, a member of X-Men Red
- Vehaan Arya
- Velayudham
- Vesper from Marvel UK's Genetix
- Vindaloo, a member of the Acolytes
- Wassi the Vast (Ashok Mohan) from The 99
- Yoddha
- Yom
- Zokkomon
- Ravi Shaw, the Blue Beast Morphers Ranger from Power Rangers Beast Morphers

=== Pakistan ===
- 3 Bahadur
- Nastoor from Ainak Wala Jin
- Buraak
- Burka Avenger
- Commander Safeguard
- DarkLion from FAB Comics
- Faiza Hussain from Marvel Comics
- First Seeker from FAB Comics
- Mobile Jin
- Ms. Marvel (Kamala Khan) from Marvel Comics
- Paak Legion
- Spark
- Super Sohni

=== Sri Lankan ===
- Suvik Senyaka, a member of the Acolytes in Marvel Comics

== Southeast Asian ==
=== Cambodian ===
- OMAC (Kevin Kho), member of the Justice League International

=== Filipino ===
- Bagwis
- Batang X, superhero team movie of 1995
- Bayan Knights
- Biotrog
- Boy Pinoy
- Buhawi Jack
- Captain Barbell
- Captain Philippines
- Commander Steel (Earth-2) from DC Comics
- Combatron
- Darna
- Dragonna
- Fantastic Man
- Fantastikids
- Flash Bomba
- Gagambino
- Gagamboy, protagonist of a 2004 Filipino film
- Grail from Wetworks
- Hagibis
- Ipo-ipo
- Joaquin Bordado
- Juan dela Cruz
- Kapitan Boom
- Kamandag
- Kidlat
- Krystala
- Kung Fu Kids
- Lagim
- Lastikman
- Ang Panday
- Olen
- Patintina
- Pedro Penduko
- Pepeng Agimat
- Sandugo, a superhero team
- Siopawman
- Sipatos
- Super B
- Super Inggo
- Super Islaw
- Super Twins
- Tiny Tony
- Triumph Division from Marvel Comics
- Varga
- Volta
- Wapakman
- Wave (Marvel Comics)
- Widad the Loving (Hope Mendoza) of the 99
- Zsazsa Zaturnnah
- Zaido: the Space Sherriffs, a spinoff of the Metal Hero Series
- Lucas Kendall, the Blue Time Force Ranger from Power Rangers Time Force
- Alyssa Enrilé, the White Wild Force Ranger from Power Rangers Wild Force

=== Indonesian ===
- id:Aquanus
- Cascade from Global Guardians by DC Comics
- id:Bima Satria Garuda
- id:Caroq
- id:Garuda Superhero
- id:Gundala (pahlawan super)
- id:Godam (komik)
- id:Godam Reborn
- id:Gatot kaca
- id:Hiro Pembela Bumi
- id:Jin Kartubi
- id:Kalong
- id:Kapten Halilintar
- Melati Kusuma / Komodo from Marvel Comics
- id:Maza
- id:Merpati
- id:Panji Manusia Millenium
- id:Pangeran Mlaar
- id:Saras 008
- id:Sembrani (komik)
- id:Si Buta Dari Gua Hantu
- id:Sri Asih
- id:Wiro Sableng

=== Thailand ===
- Chad Lee, the Blue Lightspeed Ranger from Power Rangers Lightspeed Rescue
- Antonio Garcia, the Gold Samurai Ranger from Power Rangers Samurai*
- Mercury Man
- White Tiger (Marvel Comics)

=== Vietnamese ===
- Karma (Xuân Cao Mạnh), member of the New Mutants and X-Men (Marvel Comics)
- Xi'an Chi Xan from X-Men 2099 (Marvel Comics)
- Melee (Thao Tran), a member of the Exceptional X-Men (Marvel Comics)
- Blue Dragon (Marvel Comics), a character created for Marvel Future Fight
- Green Lantern (Tai Pham) from DC Comics
- Trini Kwan, the original Yellow Ranger from Mighty Morphin Power Rangers
- Mighty Guardians

=== Malaysian ===
- BoBoiBoy
- Cameron Watanabe, the Green Samurai Ranger from Power Rangers Ninja Storm
- Cicak Man, protagonist of a Malaysian film series
- Keluang Man
- Munira Khairuddin, from DC Comics
- Sun Bird, a Marvel Future Fight original character (Marvel Comics)
- Ejen Ali
- Mechamato
- Sarjan Husin, a Superhero Character from Upin & Ipin

=== Singaporean ===
- Ghost-Maker (Minhkhoa Khan), from DC Comics, anti-hero and ally of Batman
- Jenny Quantum, member of The Authority
- Jitter (Sofia Yong), member of the Outliers (Uncanny X-Men vol. 6)

== West Asian ==
=== Iranian ===
- Sirocco, an ally of Superman (DC Comics)
- Super-Shayk (DC Comics)
- Zari Tarazi from Legends of Tomorrow
- WingLord (FAB Comics)

=== Iraqi ===
- Desert Sword (Marvel Comics)
  - Aminedi
  - Black Raazer
  - Sirocco
  - Veil

=== Israeli ===
- Hayoth (DC Comics)
- Legion/David Haller (Marvel Comics)
- Sabra/Ruth-Bat Seraph (Marvel Comics)
- Seraph/Chaim Levon of the Global Guardians (DC Comics)

=== Lebanese ===
- Amulet/Fadi Fadlallah (Marvel Comics)
- Green Lantern/Simon Baz (DC Comics - Lebanese-American)

=== Palestinian ===
- Arabian Knight (Marvel Comics - Palestinian-born Saudi Arabian)
- Iron Butterfly/Kahina Eskandari (DC Comics)
- StreamWalker (FAB Comics)

=== Saudi Arabian ===
- Archer of Arabia of the Green Arrows of the World (DC Comics)
- Naif al-Sheikh, a former member of Justice League Elite (DC Comics)

=== Syrian ===
- Sandstorm of the Global Guardians (DC Comics)
- Silver Scorpion/Bashir Bari (Liquid Comics)

=== Turkish ===
- Crescent Star Man (Lizard tv series
- Janissary/Selma Tolon, a sorceress with the mystical scimitar of Suleiman the Magnificent (DC Comics)
- Night Girl (Lizard tv series)
- Raider (Lizard TV series)
- Raider (series)
- The Masked Five (Movies)

== Afro-Asian, Eurasian and other mixed ancestry examples ==
- Akihiro, also known as Daken, Wolverine, Fang and Hellverine (Japanese and Canadian)
- Artemis Crock (from the Young Justice animated series) (Vietnamese and European descent)
- Black Knight (Jacks Chopra) (British-American and Indian descent)
- Cam Long (Chinese and Irish)
- Captain Flamingo (Japanese and Canadian)
- Cassandra Cain (variously known as Batgirl, Black Bat and Orphan) (Chinese and European descent)
- Deep Blue from DC Comics (Japanese and European descent)
- Feilong, a leader of Orchis (Chinese and Serbian descent)
- Fever, member of the Doom Patrol
- Gehenna, supporting character from DC Comics' Firestorm comic book series (Vietnamese and European descent)
- Ghost Rider 2099 (European and Japanese descent)
- Green Arrow (Connor Hawke) (Korean, African-American and European descent)
- Grunge
- J2 (Japanese and European)
- Carol and Jane Kent from Superman: Secret Identity (Indian descent)
- Karate Kid (Japanese and European descent)
- Kid Flash (a.k.a. Impulse) (Korean-American and European descent)
- Kid Kaiju (Kei Kawade) (Japanese and European descent)
- Lady Trieu from the Watchmen television series (German and Vietnamese)
- Ladybug (Chinese and French)
- Lúz La Luminosa (Chinese and Dominican) created by Edgardo Miranda-Rodriguez
- Mandarin (Chinese and English)
- Mantis (Vietnamese and German)
- Meanstreak from X-Men 2099
- Midnight's Fire (Cambodian and African American)
- Mongrel from DC Comics (Cambodian and African American)
- Peni Parker (Japanese and European)
- Ravager (Rose Wilson) (Cambodian and European descent)
- Red Hood (Lian Harper), daughter of Arsenal and Cheshire
- Red Arrow (Emiko Queen), daughter of Robert Queen and Shado (Japanese and European descent)
- Shinobi Shaw (Japanese and European descent)
- Shi (Japanese and European descent)
- Silhouette from New Warriors (Cambodian and African-American)
- Skye / Quake (from Agents of S.H.I.E.L.D.) (Chinese and European descent)
- Smasher from Dynamo 5
- Traci Thirteen (Chinese and European descent)
- Thunder and Lightning (Vietnamese and European descent)
- Colleen Wing (Japanese and European descent)
- Damian Wayne, son of Bruce Wayne and Talia al Ghul (Chinese, Arab and European descent)
- Ashley Hammond, the Yellow Turbo and Space Ranger from Power Rangers Turbo, and Power Rangers in Space
- Nick Russel, the Red Mystic Ranger from Power Rangers Mystic Force
- Rose Ortiz, the Pink Overdrive Ranger from Power Rangers Operation Overdrive
- Theo Martin, the Blue Jungle Fury Ranger from Power Rangers Jungle Fury
- Gem, designated as Ranger Gold from Power Rangers RPM
- Mia Watanabe, the Pink Samurai Ranger from Power Rangers Samurai, (not related to Cameron Watanabe)
- Troy Burrows, the Red Megaforce Ranger from Power Rangers Megaforce
- Koda, the Blue Dino Charge Ranger from Power Rangers Dino Charge
- Brody Romero, the first Red Ninja Steel Ranger from Power Rangers Ninja Steel, (the main red of the Super/Ninja Steel)
- Preston Tien, the Blue Ninja Steel Ranger from Power Rangers Ninja Steel
- Dane Romero, another Red Ninja Steel Ranger from Power Rangers Ninja Steel, (he appeared first but was the third to appear with his own suit)
- Levi Weston/Aiden Romero, the Gold Ninja Steel Ranger from Power Rangers Ninja Steel
- Kimberly Hart, as the Pink Ranger from Power Rangers (2017)
- Zack Taylor, as the Black Ranger from Power Rangers (2017)

== Other Asian characters ==
- Ajak from Eternals (Siberian in the comics, Lebanese in the film)
- Batman (Terry McGinnis) (Asian and Irish descent in Batman: Beyond the White Knight)
- Eugene Choi, member of the Shazam Family
- Gilgamesh from Eternals (depicted as Korean in the film)
- Hat from The Elite
- Invincible from Invincible (depicted as half-Korean in the television series)
- Jade (Jennifer Rice)
- Kamal El Alaoui, a member of the Acolytes in Marvel Comics, is portrayed as an Asian member of the future X-Men in Wolverine and the X-Men
- Kingo from Eternals (Japanese in the comics and Indian in the film, played by Pakistani-American actor Kumail Nanjiani)
- Raksha, a group of mutants from the fictional Southeast Asian island of Madripoor
  - Gazing Nightshade
  - Norio
  - Whisper Doll
  - Hexadecimal
- Sersi from Eternals (Greek in the comics, Chinese in the film).
