= Tarun Kumar Wahi =

Indian artist

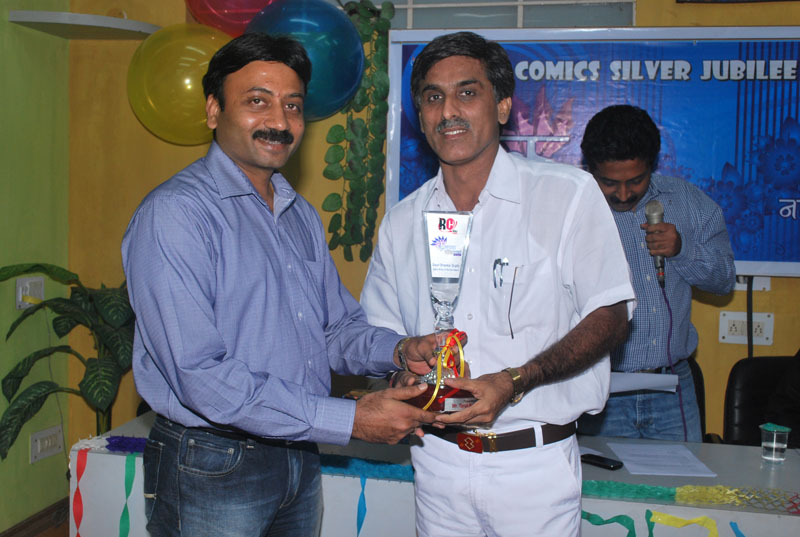
Tarun Kumar Wahi (right) receiving the Best Script Writer Award from Raja Pocket Books CEO Manoj Gupta, 2010

Tarun Kumar Wahi is an Indian comic book artist and writer. He is the chief writer for Raj Comics and creator of the superheroes Doga, Parmanu, Bheriya and several others.

== See also ==
- Comics Fest India
