= Manoj Gupta =

Indian comics creator (born 1967)

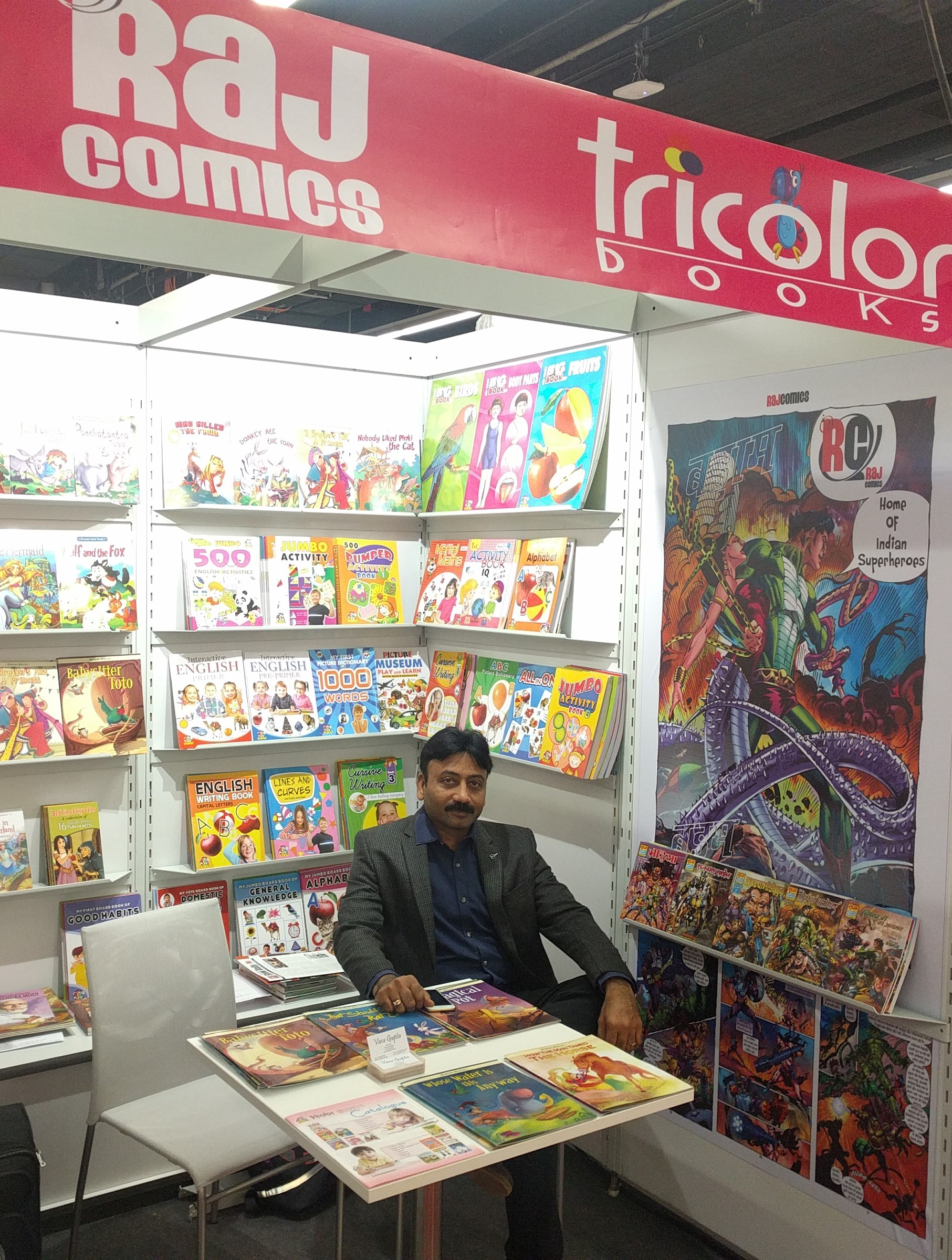
- Born: Manoj Gupta; December 23, 1967 (age 58) New Delhi
- Areas: Editor, Publisher, Director
- Pseudonym: Raja
- Notable works: Raj Comics; Nagraj; Super Commando Dhruva; Doga; Bhokal; Bankelal; Tiranga; Parmanu; Bheriya; Shakti; Raja Pocket Books; Tricolor Books
- Collaborators: Anupam Sinha • Tarun Kumar Wahi • Sanjay Gupta • Dheeraj Verma • Mukesh Khanna
- Spouses: Meenu Gupta (m. 1990)
- Children: 2

Manoj Gupta (born December 23, 1967) is an Indian publisher, editor, and the President and Co-founder of Raja Pocket Books and its subsidiary Raj comics. He established the most popular and longest running comic book company Raj Comics together with his brother Sanjay Gupta. He co-created the characters Nagraj, Bankelal, Doga, Bhokal, Yoddha, etc. He introduced digital-colouring in Raj Comics back in the 1990s, making it one of the first Indian brands to use the technique. Some consumers partially credit their wildly explosive success to this technological increment.

== Publishing career ==
=== Early career ===
Gupta began his career by editing and publishing pulp-fiction books along with his father Rajkumar Gupta. They had a highly-successful run and published critically acclaimed authors like Surender Mohan Pathak, Ved Prakash Sharma, Anil Mohan and Raja. At their peak, the books sold up to 1 million copies each. While his father always had a passion for crime-thrillers, Gupta and his brother Sanjay Gupta were always thrilled with the idea of creating original Indian Superheroes. One evening, while discussing the same, Rajkumar Gupta walked in on the conversation of the two brothers and thus, Raj Comics was born.

=== Raj Comics ===
In the early days of its inception, Raj Comics published mythological, mystery and adventure comics. In 1985, Manoj Gupta came up with the idea of creating a superhero centered around snakes as he believed snakes held a religious and mythological significance in India. Later, the team started working on the concept and finally created the Nagraj that we know today.

=== Nagraj ===
After publishing mythological, mystery and adventure comics, Gupta's quest for creating a superhero resulted in Nagraj in 1985 - and India got an action hero centered around snakes. This success led to the creation of more characters. Immediately after its launch, Nagraj became a widespread success and the issues started selling more than a million copies. The debut issue of Nagraj was written by Parshuram Sharma and illustrated by Pratap Mullick. After that Sanjay Ashtpure, Pratap Mullick, Chandu, Milind Misal and Vitthal Kamble alternately illustrated the character for 44 issues, ending in 1995 with Visarpi Ki Shadi. Since 1995, with Shakoora Ka Chakravyooh the illustration work of Nagraj has been taken over by artist and writer Anupam Sinha. "Nagraj was all the rage and we had to come up with a new issue every two weeks. Sanjay and I would isolate ourselves in a room every Sunday and when we came out, we always had a new script.", said Manoj Gupta in an interview in 2013. The brothers duo Manoj Gupta and Sanjay Gupta co-authored over 20 issues under the names of Raja and Sanjay Gupta in the golden age of Nagraj. These comics focused on defining Nagraj as a character and establishing his rogues gallery.

=== Hasya Samrat: Bankelal ===
Bankelal first appeared in 1987 in the comic book 'Bankelal Ka Kamaal' ('Wonders of Bankelal') as a one shot. After going through the editing process, Manoj Gupta noticed the comic potential of the character and the entire 'Kar Bura ho Bhala' premise and started gathering elements and team to create Bankelal as a recurring character, notably, the first comedy character of Raj Comics to have a series of issues. Papinder Juneja and Jitendra Bedi worked on the first comic book as writer and artist respectively. Thereafter, Manoj Gupta took the project to Tarun Kumar Wahi, a regular at Raj Comics, to take the character forward.

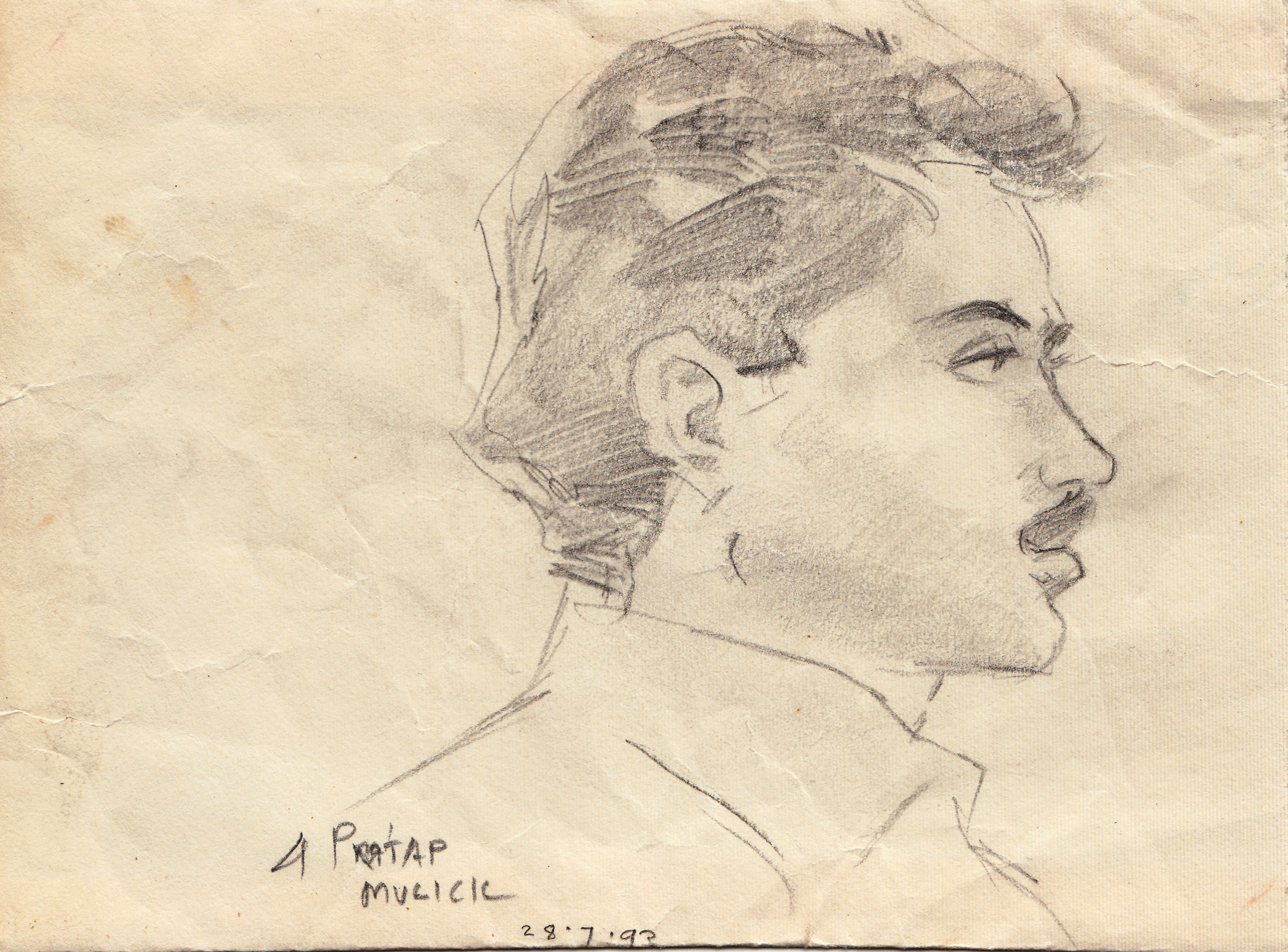
Late Shri Pratap Mullick made this sketch of Manoj Gupta while they were discussing Nagraj covers.

=== Home of Indian Superheroes ===
After the commercial success of Nagraj, Gupta launched Super Commando Dhruva, Doga, Bhokal, Tiranga, Bheriya, Parmanu and a number of other superheroes. Due to this, Raj Comics got the title of Home of Indian Superheroes from the public and media which it later incorporated in its brand name.

=== Comedy ===
Other than action superheroes, Raj Comics also publishes the comedy genre. Gupta co-created and published fan-favorite characters like Bankelal and Gamraj (comics).

=== Comic Book based on Coronavirus ===
In March 2020, Manoj Gupta authored a short comic book featuring Nagraj and a personification of the COVID-19 Virus called Coronaman. The comic book was released as a free for all special issue intended to spread awareness on precautionary measures against the disease. It also honored the healthcare workers and the authorities for their contribution in fighting the pandemic. The comic book went viral on all social media platforms and received widespread media coverage.

=== Comic Book based on Mental Health ===
In September 2020, Manoj Gupta authored a short comic book featuring Super Commando Dhruva battling Depression. The comic book was released as a free for all special issue intended to spread awareness on World Suicide Prevention Day. "For writers Manoj Gupta and Ayush Gupta, the aim wasn't to spread awareness about mental illness but instead, to normalise it.", writes Dalreen Ramos in an article for Mid-Day.

== List Of Published Original Comics ==
After the split of Raj Comics into three different entities, Raj Comics By Manoj Gupta was launched.

Sl. No.	Issue No.	YEAR	Comic Title	Artist	Author	Hero	Series	Notes
1	2652	2021	Aazadi ki Jwala	Debjyoti Bhowmick	Manoj Gupta, Ayush Gupta	Dhruva	Swatantrata Senani Dhruv #1	
2	2653	2021	Sarp Satra	Anupam Sinha	Anupam Sinha	Nagraj & Tausi	Sarp Satra #1	VishwaRakshak Nagraj's returns after a 7 years hiatus
3	2662	2021	Fir Aaya Bankelal	Prem Gunawat	Tarun Kumar Wahi	Bankey Lal	"Khel-Khel Mein" Series - Part 1	Bankelal's returns after a 7 years hiatus
4	2664	2021	Musibat Ka Khel	Prem Gunawat	Tarun Kumar Wahi	Bankey Lal	"Khel-Khel Mein" Series - Part 2	
5	2668	2021	Pitthu Garam	Prem Gunawat	Tarun Kumar Wahi	Bankey Lal	"Khel-Khel Mein" Series - Part 3	
6	2669	2021	Sarp Dwanda	Anupam Sinha	Anupam Sinha	Nagraj & Tausi	Sarp Satra #2	
7	2673	2022	Oonch Neech Ka Papda	Prem Gunawat	Tarun Kumar Wahi	Bankelal	"Khel-Khel Mein" Series - Part 4	
8	2682	2022	ShaktiRoopa (YathaRoop)	Anupam Sinha	Anupam Sinha	Dhruva	Streebhu, SindhuNaad, MrityuRoopa	Dhruva's return after a 4 year hiatus
9	2683	2022	Sarp Yagya	Anupam Sinha	Anupam Sinha	Nagraj & Tausi	Sarp Satra #3	
10	2684	2022	Terah Ghante					Thrill-Horror-Suspense
11	2691	2022	PunarUthaan	Dildeep Singh	Anurag Singh	Muti-Starrer	PunarUthaan #1	Simultaneously released by rival publisher RCSG
12	2690	2022	Kutta Panti	Gaurav Shrivastav	Tarun Kumar Wahi	Doga	SwamiBhakt Rakhwale #1	Simultaneously released by rival publisher RCSG
13	2613	2022	Bodi Wala Thanedaar	Sunil Dasturia	Nitin Mishra	Bankey Lal	Thanedaar Series #1	Simultaneously released by rival publisher RCSG
14	2636	2022	Prakoshth Ke Kaidi	Hemant Kumar	Anurag Singh, Mandar Gangele	Muti-Starrer	Sarvnayak Vistar #5	Simultaneously released by rival publisher RCSG
15	2692	2022	Pappu Doga	Mayur Saikia	Tarun Kumar Wahi	Doga		
16	2693	2022	SarvGrahan	Hemant Kumar	Nitin Mishra	Muti-Starrer	Sarvnayak #13	Simultaneously released by rival publisher RCSG
17	2695	2022	SarvAyudh	Hemant Kumar	Nitin Mishra	Muti-Starrer	Sarvnayak #14	Simultaneously released by rival publisher RCSG
18	2694	2022	Sarva Manokamna Siddhi	Sushant Panda	Tarun Kumar Wahi	Bankey Lal		Simultaneously released by rival publisher RCSG
19	2700	2022	One Last Kill			Doga	Doga Diaries 4	
20	2718	2022	SarpYug			Nagraj & Tausi	Sarp Satra #4	
21	2619	2022	Bhool Gaya Raja			Bankey Lal		Simultaneously released by rival publisher RCSG
22	2719	2022	Doga Mouzood Hai			Doga	Doga Diaries 5	
23	2720	2022	Avtaran Parv	Anupam Sinha	Anupam Sinha		MahaNagayan #1	
24	2713	2022	ShankhNaad				PunarUthaan #2	Simultaneously released by rival publisher RCSG
25	2730	2023	Rakt Parv	Anupam Sinha	Anupam Sinha		MahaNagayan #2	
26	2726	2022	Kyun Hai Doga	Manu		Doga		
27	2729	2023	Sheelbhang	Anupam Sinha			Sheelbhang #1	
28	2731	2023	Sandhi Parv	Anupam Sinha	Anupam Sinha		MahaNagayan #3	
29	2733	2023	SarpKaal	Anupam Sinha	Anupam Sinha	Nagraj & Tausi	Sarp Satra #5	
