= Comics Fest India =

Comic convention in New Delhi, India

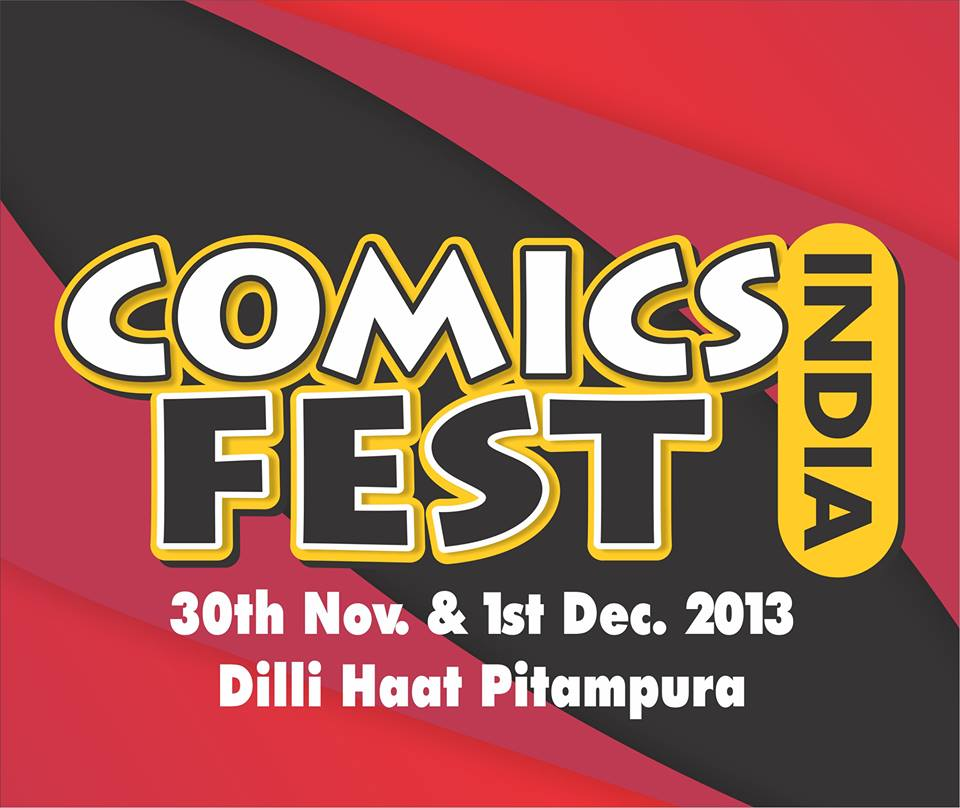
- Logo for the Comics Fest India, 2013
- Status: Defunct
- Venue: Dilli Haat, Burari
- Locations: New Delhi, India
- Inaugurated: 2008 (Started as Nagraj Janmotsav); 2013 (Renamed to Comics Fest India)
- Organizer: Raj Comics
- Website: http://www.comicsfestindia.com/

Comics Fest India (previously known as Nagraj Janmotsav) was a comic-based convention held in India, annually at New Delhi.

The event began as an annual birthday celebration for Nagraj. But the increasing number of fans and participants made the event grow larger every year, and soon the event sprang out of the Raj Comics studios (where it started) and was held at Dilli Haat, Pitampura.

The event is popular for being the only convention in India that provides free gifts (including T-shirts, comic books and merchandise) to all the registered attendees. Now it is the second annual comic book convention in New Delhi, after Comic Con India.

== History ==
In 2008, Raj Comics hosted 3 events namely, Gen-Next Writers Workshop (January 2008), Junoon Mela (June 2008), and Nagraj Janmotsav (4–5 October 2008). Nagraj Janmotsav was the birthday celebration of Raj Comics's flagship character Nagraj.

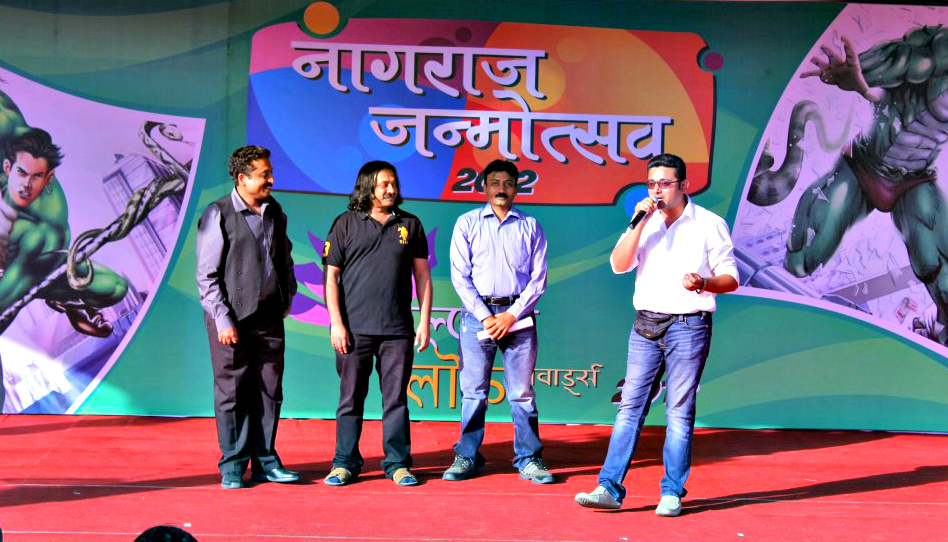
(From left-right) Manish Gupta, Sanjay Gupta and Manoj Gupta with the host Kshitij Sharma at Nagraj Janmotsav, 2012.

What started as a birthday celebration for their flagship character, soon grew into an annual convention attended by several fans and creators. Raj Comics organized the initial events at Rtoonz Studios (Burari). Each year, the event kept growing both in size and space and in 2012, it was held at Dilli Haat, Pitampura.

In 2013, Raj Comics declared that Nagraj Janmotsav will be celebrated on an even bigger scale and was called Comics Fest India. This new bigger convention showcased stalls by multiple Indian publishing houses, including, but not restricted to, Raj Comics, Tricolor Children Books, Campfire Novels, Holycow Entertainment, Paperclip Books, Rovolt Comics, Fenil Comics and many other publishers.

These conventions include many contests, interactive sessions, comics launches, workshops and speeches by various novelists, editors, comic book artists and writers.

== Kalpana Lok Awards ==
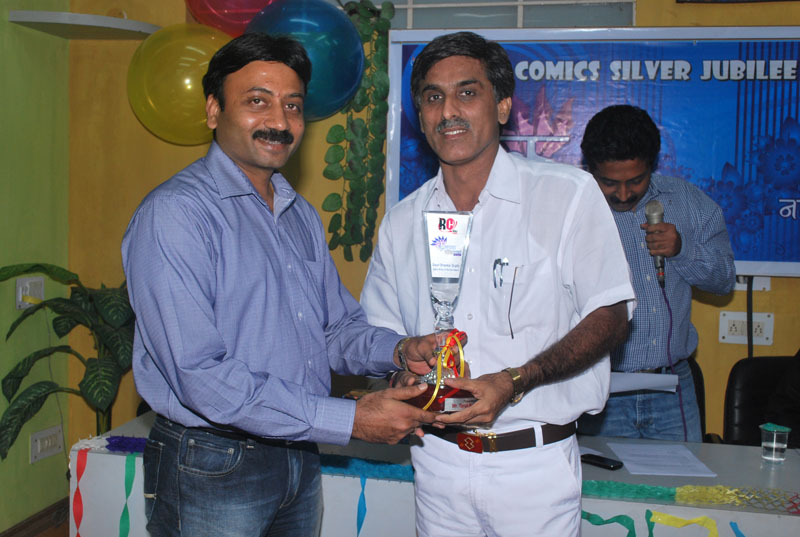
Tarun Kumar Wahi (right) receiving the Best Script Writer Award from Raja Pocket Books CEO Mr. Manoj Gupta, 2010

In 2010, Raj Comics celebrated its Silver Jubilee with the third Nagraj Janmotsav. During this event Raj Comics started honouring the excellence of its own creatives with an in-house award ceremony, called Kalpana Lok Awards. The celebration opened with Nagraj's Birthday followed by inaugural Kalpana lok awards.

Raj Comics editors nominates creative individuals under different categories like Best - Penciller, Webcomic, Script Writer, Graphic Designer, Inker, Colorist. Winners are decided by a special jury of authors and artists appointed by organizers, and the fans who can vote online on Comics Fest India as well as Raj Comics websites. Fourth edition of Kalpana Lok Awards was one of the most publicized attractions of Comics Fest India 2013.

In 2013, during the Comics Fest India, the awards called for submissions from various publishers all over the country. The categories were expanded and several publishing houses participated in the awards.

== Comics Fest India 2013 ==
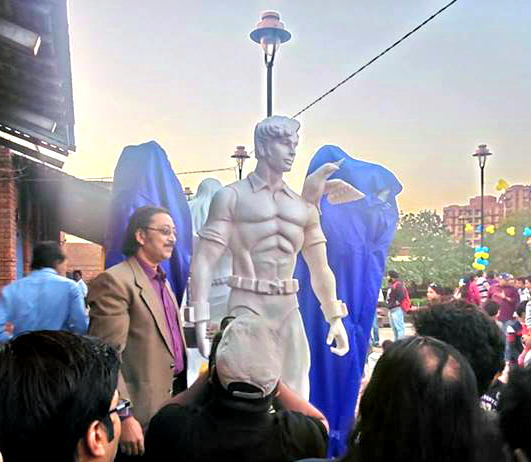
Writer and artist, Anupam Sinha with the unveiled statue of his popular comic book superhero Super Commando Dhruva, at Comics Fest India, 2013.

Jointly organized by Punjab Kesari and Animation Xpress, Comics Fest India was held from 30 November – 1 December 2013 at Dilli Haat, New Delhi, India. In an attempt to expand the event apart from participants from previous editions many new publishers, animation companies participated, such as Amar Chitra Katha, Diamond Comics, Holy Cow Entertainment, Any Magic Studios, Pustak Mahal, Geek Mentors Studios, Fenil Comics, Campfire Graphic Novels, Lotpot, Freelance talents, National Book Trust.

The event contained various workshops, launches and activities. These mini events included; fan introduction, workshops on creative writing, storytelling and publishing; contests such as cosplay, comic trivia and one liners. Also, many fans performed various comic skits on stage and to entertain little kids, magic show and a drawing competition were held.

Raj Comics also unveiled the life size statues of its superheroes during the event. Mukesh Khanna attended the event as a special guest.

After having been the host for previous two Nagraj Janmotsav Events, Delhi based emcee Kshitij Sharma once again hosted the on-stage proceedings for Comics Fest India, 2013

== See also ==
- Comic Con India 2019 - Showcase Delhi
- Comic Con India
