= Super Indian =

- Super Indian; Raj Comics

Publication information
- Publisher: Raj Comics
- Created by: Dilip Chaubey & Tarun Kumar Wahi

In-story information
- Alter ego: Aman
- Team affiliations: P.O.E.M.
- Notable aliases: Aman
- Abilities: Superhuman strength, endurance and speed; Flight

Super Indian is a comic book superhero character appearing in Indian comics published by Raj Comics.

== Origin ==
Aman, the alter ego of Super Indian, is depicted as a clone created by the fictional terrorist leader Ahankari, following a life-threatening confrontation with infiltrator William Boother. Seeking a successor, Ahankari enlisted the expertise of Dr. Heathrow to meticulously replicate every aspect of himself through cloning. The accelerated growth of the clone was facilitated by cloned genes, rapidly bringing him to adulthood. To mold Aman into a worthy successor, a group of super villains were tasked with training and equipping him.

Notably concerned that Aman might inherit his son's malevolence, Ahankari's father arranged for the intervention of the Indian mystic "Rudraksh Baba" to oversee the upbringing of his grandson. Despite initial resistance, Rudraksh Baba effectively purged all malevolent inclinations from the clone, confining them under the symbolic mark of a Trident, signifying the influence of Lord Shiva. As an unexpected side effect of this mystical process, Aman's skin would turn blue whenever he sensed evil.

Under the guidance of Rudraksh Baba, Aman adopted the name Super Indian and assumed the role of a heroic figure, embodying Indian mysticism by wearing the ceremonial Indian "dhoti." He further honed his heroic skills by learning from various Indian Superheroes from the Raj Comics universe. His protective efforts extended to India and the technologically advanced Metro City, serving as his operational base. Due to lacking any biological relatives, he affectionately refers to all members of P.O.E.M (Protectors Of Earth & Mankind) as his uncles and aunt, acknowledging them as his guardians in this world.

== Enemies ==
As soon as he started crime-fighting, Super Indian has made his own share of rogues gallery who threaten his life and the City he protects. His nemesis includes :

· Uncle Metro : He is the Crime Lord of Metro City, who claims that no crime happens in Metro City without his knowledge or permission. His nephew Petro was severely injured during the battle with Super Indian, and ultimately got into coma. He vowed revenge on Super Indian for sending his nephew to coma and wants to kill him out of vengeance.

· Nephew Petro : The nephew of the Crime Lord, Uncle Metro. He was severely injured during his first fight with Super Indian and is currently in coma.

· Red Eyebrow : A scientific genius, Red Eyebrow wanted himself to be the developer of the Metro City, but lost to some other scientist. Now he seeks vengeance on the city and wants to destroy it completely and recreate it all by himself.

== Super Indian's Comic Issues ==
Raj Comics has published the following titles as Super Indian's issues:

Comic Titles
Super Indian
Super Indian Kaun
Villain Chacha
Pehla Khoon
Doosra Khoon
Project Setusamudram
Uncle Metro
Hightech Hero
TimeBomb
Ek Se Badhkar Ek
Palda
Super Villain
Live Show
Chemical Lochcha
