= Sanjay Gupta (comics) =

Indian comics writer (born 1966)

- Born: December 7, 1966 (age 59) New Delhi
- Areas: Writer, Editor, Publisher
- Pseudonym: Gabbar Gupta
- Notable works: Nagraj; Doga; Bhokal; Parmanu; Yoddha; Super Commando Dhruva; Tiranga; Bankelal; Parmanu; Bheriya; Shakti; Raja Pocket Books; Tri color Books; Raj Comics; Alpha Book Publishers

Sanjay Gupta (born December 7, 1966) is an Indian comic book writer, editor, the studio head and Founder of Raj comics and is considered to be father of Indian Superheroes.

Sanjay Gupta is one of the key people of Raj Comics, along with his brothers Manoj Gupta and Manish Gupta, He created the characters Nagraj, Doga, Bhokal, Yoddha, it is Nagraj who was the first superhero of India.

== Early life and family ==
Sanjay Gupta was born on December 7, 1966, in New Delhi, India. He is the son of Rajkumar Gupta, the founder of Raja Pocket Books. Alongside his brothers, Manoj Gupta and Manish Gupta, Sanjay co-founded Raj Comics in 1986. The trio aimed to create original Indian superheroes, leading to the establishment of a distinctive Indian comic book universe.

== Publishing career ==
=== Early career ===
After completing his education in 1984, Sanjay Gupta joined his father's publishing business, Raja Pocket Books, which was known for pulp-fiction novels. In 1986, leveraging their experience, Sanjay and his brothers launched Raj Comics, focusing on Indian superheroes. Their first creation was Nagraj, a character inspired by Indian mythology and folklore.

Alpha Book Publishers and Raj Comics By Sanjay Gupta was formed on 26 October 2020 on auspicious day of Vijayadashami as successor of Raja Pocket Books and Raj Comics and fondly known as RCSG among Comic Fans.

RCSG has been serving their fans with number of original titles as well as quality reprints of comics originally published by Raj Comics since 1986.

== List Of Published Original Comics ==
Issue No.	YEAR	Comic Title	Artist	Author	Hero	Series	Notes
1	2021	Aadi Parv	Hemant Kumar	Nitin Mishra	Nagraj, Doga, Kobi	Naag Granth #1	Narak Nashak Nagraj
2	2021	Naag Pralay	Adil Khan Pathan	Nitin Mishra	Nagraj & Tausi	Pralay Ka Devta #1	Post-Yugarambh Nagraj
3	2021	Trap	Hemant Kumar, Sushant Panda	Mandar Gangele	Chandika / Dhruva	Neo #1	Follow up to Code Name Comet
4	2021	Dosh-Poorna	Naresh Kumar	Anurag Singh	Bheria	Shuddhikaran #1	Follow up to Amar-Prem Series
5	2021	Kachra Peti	Dildeep Singh	Sanjay Gupta, Vivek Mohan	Doga	Rakta-Katha #1	
6	2022	Aboora Ka Tilism	Sushant Panda	Anurag Singh, Sushant Panda	AshwaRaj & BankeLal	Ashwa-Samrat BankeLal #1	
7	2022	Kisne Jhapad Mara Dhruv Ko	Sushant Panda	Anurag Singh	Muti-Starrer	Hasya Hindola	Raj Kids Universe
8	2022	Meri Sonu	Dildeep Singh	Sanjay Gupta, Vivek Mohan	Doga	Rakta-Katha #2	
9	2022	Aadhipatya	Naresh Kumar	Anurag Singh	Bheria	Shuddhikaran #2	Follow up to Amar-Prem Series
10	2022	Naag Parv	Hemant Kumar	Nitin Mishra	Nagraj, Doga, Kobi	Naag Granth #2	Narak Nashak Nagraj
11	2022	Kutta Panti	Gaurav Shrivastav	Tarun Kumar Wahi	Doga	SwamiBhakt Rakhwale #1	Simultaneously released by rival publisher RCMG
12	2022	PunarUthaan	Dildeep Singh	Anurag Singh	Muti-Starrer	PunarUthaan #1	Simultaneously released by rival publisher RCMG
13	2022	Bodi Wala Thanedaar	Sunil Dasturia	Nitin Mishra	BankeLal	Thanedaar Series #1	Simultaneously released by rival publisher RCMG
14	2022	Happy Valentines Day	Sushant Panda	Mandar Gangele	Muti-Starrer		Raj Kids Universe
15	2022	Prakoshth Ke Kaidi	Hemant Kumar	Anurag Singh, Mandar Gangele	Muti-Starrer	Sarvnayak Vistar #5	Simultaneously released by rival publisher RCMG
16	2022	Naag Pralop	Adil Khan Pathan	Nitin Mishra	Nagraj & Tausi	Pralay Ka Devta #2	Post-Yugarambh Nagraj
17	2022	Mrityu-Rathi	Lalit Singh	Nitin Mishra	Bhokal	Agnipath Series #1	First Bhokal Solo comics after 11 Years
18	2022	Balidaan Tumhara	Dildeep Singh	Sanjay Gupta, Vivek Mohan	Doga	Rakta-Katha #3	
19	2022	Ran-Bheri	Naresh Kumar	Anurag Singh	Bheria	Shuddhikaran #3	Follow up to Amar-Prem Series
20	2022	SarvGrahan	Hemant Kumar	Nitin Mishra	Muti-Starrer	Sarvnayak #13	Simultaneously released by rival publisher RCMG
21	2022	ShankhNaad	Dildeep Singh, Vinod Kumar	Nitin Mishra, Anurag Singh	Muti-Starrer	PunarUthaan #2	Simultaneously released by rival publisher RCMG
22	2022	SarvAyuddh				Sarvnayak #14	Simultaneously released by rival publisher RCMG
23	2022	Taru Tilism	Sushant Panda	Anurag Singh, Sushant Panda	AshwaRaj & BankeLal	Ashwa-Samrat BankeLal #2	
24	2022	SarvSamar				Sarvnayak #15	Simultaneously released by rival publisher RCMG
25	2022	Agni-Khand	Lalit Singh	Nitin Mishra	Bhokal	Agnipath Series #2	
26	2022	Sarva Manokamna Siddhi			BankeLal		Simultaneously released by rival publisher RCMG
27	2022	Bhool Gaya Raja	Sushant Panda	Tarun Kumar Wahi	BankeLal		Simultaneously released by rival publisher RCMG
29	2022	DAYAN MAA [DIGEST]				REPRINT	Thrill-Horror-Suspense
30	2022	Aranyak Parv	Hemant Kumar	Nitin Mishra	Nagraj, Doga, Kobi	Naag Granth #3	Narak Nashak Nagraj
30	2022	KHURRAT [DIGEST]				REPRINT	Thrill-Horror-Suspense
31	2022	ROTDI [DIGEST]				REPRINT	Thrill-Horror-Suspense
32	2022	Streebhu			Dhruva	Shakti-Roopa #1	
33	2023	Atikraman	Naresh Kumar	Anurag Singh	Bheria	Shuddhikaran #4	Follow up to Amar-Prem Series
34	2022	Yog Nidra			BankeLal		
35	2023	Halkaan Ho	Dildeep Singh	Sanjay Gupta, Vivek Mohan	Doga	Rakta-Katha #4	
36	2022	SindhuNaad			Dhruva	Shakti-Roopa #2	
37	2023	Swarn Granth				Ashwa-Samrat BankeLal #3	
38	2023	Mrityu-Roopa			Dhruva	Shakti-Roopa #3	
39	2023	Kaun Bada Jhapadbaaz	Sushant Panda	Anurag Singh	Muti-Starrer	Hasya Hindola	Raj Kids Universe
40	2023	Kutta Ghati			Doga	SwamiBhakt Rakhwale #2	
41	2023	Ardha-Satya	Anupam Sinha	Nitin Mishra	Nagraj	Sheel-Bhanga #1	
42	2023	Sankramit	Naresh Kumar	Anurag Singh	Bheria	Shuddhikaran #5	Follow up to Amar-Prem Series
43	2023	Sthapatya Khand				Sarvanayak	
44	2023	Ja Vadh Kar	Dildeep Singh	Sanjay Gupta, Vivek Mohan	Doga	Rakta-Katha #5	
45	2023	Halahal Parv				Naag Granth #4	Narak Nashak Nagraj
46	2023	Atiriktank	Hemant Kumar	Tarun Kumar Wahi	Nagraj		Mrityubhoomi + Vishaili
47	2023	Dog Promise			Doga	SwamiBhakt Rakhwale #3	
48	2023	Ret Ka Shahenshah				Sarvnayak Vistar #6	
49	2023	Ullanghan			Bheria		
50	2024	Kalantar	Adil Khan Pathan, Sanjay Valecha	Nitin Mishra, Anurag Singh	Multi-Starrer	PunarUtthan#3	
51	2024	Bhago Jhapad aaya		Mandaar Gangele, Anurag Singh	Multi-Starrer		
52	2024	Ashwasamrath Bankelal			AshwaRaj & Bankelal	Ahswa-Samrat Bankelal #4	
53	2024	Mahabhiyog		Anurag Singh	Bheria		
54	2024	Hoo ou ou returns			Thrill, Horror, Suspense		
55	2024	Ground Zero		Mandaar Gangele	Dhruva		

== Writer and creator ==
Sanjay Gupta was a huge fan of superheroes since childhood, which lead to him creating an Indian superhero universe. He developed the Raj Comics Superhero Universe, including many iconic superheroes such as Nagraj, Doga, Bhokal, Parmanu, Tiranga, Anthony, Ashwaraj, Inspector Steel and several others.

=== Rise to Stardom - Nagraj ===
Sanjay Gupta and Manoj Gupta created Nagraj who is a fictional superhero appearing in Indian comic books published by Raj Kumar Gupta under Raja Pocket Books in the late 1980s by Rajkumar Gupta. Nagraj first appeared in the comics Nagraj GENL #14 which was written by Parshuram Sharma and illustrated by Pratap Mullick.Nagraj is believed to have been inspired by the mythological Ichchhadhari Nag (shapeshifting snakes) and historical Vishmanushya . His stories create a rich blend of mythology, fantasy, magic, and science fiction. Over the time nagraj attainted a rich fandom.

== Films ==
In 2014, Anurag Kashyap had spoken about making a film on Doga—a vigilante killing machine in the style of Marvel Comics' The Punisher—but the project was shelved after his Bombay Velvet flopped. Raj Comics co-founder and studio head Sanjay Gupta says "Bollywood is yet to warm up to the idea of licensing comic book characters that come with detailed universes and visuals ready for the screen. We want to start with animated Web series first. We are expecting to make our first live-action film the year after." In December 2017, Raj Comics organized special screening of their horror film Aadamkhor at Nagraj Janmotsav event, Delhi. Aadamkhor is based on comic of the same name published by Raj Comics in 1992. Raj comics has released Aadamkhor on YouTube on 24 May 2018.

It was also announced in December 2019, that Ranveer Singh was in reports to play Nagraj in a film produced by Karan Johar. Looking forward to their film in 2022.

These announcement has been done from time to time but till now no movie has been released. There is statement by Anurag Kashyap on media that due to high expectation of publisher on stakes. It is impossible to work with them. Generations has been past and still there is zero chances of getting see these Raj Comics Superheroes in Big screen.
