= Anthony (character) =

Publication information
- Publisher: Raj Comics

In-story information
- Alter ego: Anthony Gonsalves; The Dead; Zinda Murda
- Team affiliations: P.O.E.M.
- Partnerships: Venu, Saja, Inspector later DCP Itihaas
- Abilities: Superhuman strength; Superhuman speed; Superhuman stamina; Superhuman durability; Superhuman agility; Superhuman invulnerability; Superhuman regenerative healing factor; Longevity/Immortality; Enhanced senses; Resistance to telepathy; Hellfire creation; Teleportation

Anthony is a Raj comics character. The character and the plot is inspired by The Crow, created by James O'Barr.

== Origin ==
He was murdered by jealousy and later resurrected by nature itself. he is now alive and as long as his soul is out of his body, his corpse lies motionless, but his corpse was possessed several times by numerous enemies including Count Dracula.

== Plot summary ==
The late Anthony Gonsalvez, a young music enthusiast, composed an original album entitled "Crow Music". This album became very popular, much to the dismay of his competitors. He was tortured to death by his rivals. He is fondly remembered by his wife Julia and daughter Maria and his pet crow Prince still sits on his tombstone to mourn his death.

Whenever innocent people are subjected to injustice, Prince cries out, loud and shrill, in the graveyard. The air trembles, the clouds thunder, lightning flashes, and the dead man Anthony rises out of his grave to render the justice.

== Powers and abilities ==
Anthony can make use of cold fire, also called as hellfire, as a lethal weapon against his enemies. Though he cannot be hurt in any possible human way, after his death he became hydrophobic. On his second resurrection, this limit of his was removed. Anthony regenerates each time after he kills his enemy, and until then his corpse remains mutilated. He has superhuman strength as of Shakti, Nagraj and other superhumans of the Raj Comics universe. Psychic powers like telepathy do not affect him at all. He can teleport at any place on his wish.

== Family, friends and allies ==
- Julie (wife)
- Maria (daughter)
- Prince Crow
- Inspector/DCP Itihaas
- Venu AKA Saza
- John (Maria's husband)

== Enemies ==
- Bhanja
- Bhairav Nath
- Prof. Jaandaal
- khuler baba
- Gajanan
- baban
- lashkhor
- Obo
- pisaach
- Jeevan data
- koyla
- kala doctor
- Murda supari
- Kaga
- Dr Bharati
- Yamraj
- Justice kaal
- Death stone
- Vulture gang
- operator
- Deadly
- Dyne
- Dozer gang
