= Shakti (comics) =

Indian comic book character

Publication information
- Publisher: Raj Comics
- Created by: Anupam Sinha

In-story information
- Alter ego: Chanda
- Team affiliations: P.O.E.M.
- Notable aliases: Chanda
- Abilities: Superhuman strength and durability; Flight and superspeed; Ability to turn into light, fire and other energy forms; Divine vision, clairvoyance and ability to speak any language; Divine weapons; Fire, Heat and Metal manipulation; Third eye which can decimate evil; Accelerated healing factor; Immortality; Body splitting and size manipulation; Time travel

Shakti is an Indian comic book character, one of a number of titles published by Raj Comics. Her special powers include fire and a third eye. She is similar to Thor from Marvel Comics, who lived as the mortal doctor Donald Blake for a time. Shakti is a transcending incarnation of Kali, the destroyer of demons. She has a raging desire to get justice for women in this man's world. Cries of distress from any woman anywhere in the world transform her into a ferocious killer known as Shakti.

== Fictional character biography ==
=== Origin ===
Chanda is the host for the spirit of Shakti. Chanda was an ordinary housewife until she discovered that her husband had been killing her daughters. The monstrosity and injustice of it all opens up the volcano of anger in her, sending the smoke to the heavens. The Goddess Kali uses Chanda's body to transform into Shakti and deliver justice. Chanda killed her husband in the form of Shakti. Chanda keeps herself busy in hospital and social work.

=== Attributes ===
Chanda has a third eye, which is the sign of Kali, but she keeps it covered with a headband that she pretends to use to cure her permanent migraine.

As a housewife, Chanda is extremely simple and not very much educated. She lacks sex appeal, due to which she was disliked by her former husband. Her alter ego, Shakti, on the other hand, does not tolerate injustice and crime at all and is also strikingly beautiful. Although considered hotheaded and arrogant, she is gracious enough to generate love in people's hearts for one another. Physically, she is blue in colour, stands 5 feet and 7 inches in height and weighs about 50 kg.

=== Powers and abilities ===
Chanda has the power of the anger of women of the world. She can sense any woman's cry and pain in the world and can turn into light and travel at the speed of light. The incredible amount of energy in her, when released, melts all metals and instantly molds it into shapes and designs as projected by Shakti's mind. When she opens her third eye in anger, it beams infernos to burn down the cause of her rage. She is physically the strongest character in the Raj comics universe. She could even carry an airplane with ease and can travel with it at the speed of light. In Trikali, she used time travel to go to the past with her super speed. She also has superhuman strength and endurance.

=== Enemies ===
Though she fought most of the other Raj Comics superheroes in her initial comics because of some coincidental misunderstanding, she later became a member of the Brahmand Rakshak, a community of superheroes similar to the Justice League in the DC Universe.

== Titles ==
Raj Comics has published a total of 97 titles on Shakti.

SPCL 111 Doga Shakti

GENL 880 Aayi Musibat

GENL 883 Zinda Patthar

SPCL 115 Parmanu Shakti

SPCL 106 Baambi

SPCL 116 Dhruva Shakti

GENL 908 Amanush

GENL 918 Aadhi Aurat

GENL 909 Aayi Shakti

GENL 914 Vardi Wali Aurat

GENL 919 Pawanputri

GENL 924 Maut ke Deewane

GENL 934 Joker

GENL 944 Khabardar Shahri

GENL 948 Puja Express

GENL 964 Chorni

GENL 978 Advocate Madhuri

SPCL 137 Kalyug

GENL 988 Border

GENL 991 Wonder Women

GENL 993 Phool Aur Kante

GENL 1001 Saare Jahan Se Uncha

GENL 1015 Mahabala

SPCL 160 Zero G

GENL 1033 Chingari

SPCL 173 Nash Ketu

SPCL 175 Aa Shakti Aa Parmanu

GENL 1056 Yogini

SPCL 185 Kohram

GENL 1069 Maang Mein Angarein

GENL 1077 Dayan

GENL 1091 Maa

GENL 1094 Sharir Chhalni

GENL 1104 Ganga Jamuna Saraswati

GENL 1116 Yogmaya

GENL 1125 Andhak

GENL 1133 Shakti Help Me

GENL 1137 Nishachari

SPCL 235 Jaljala

GENL 1144 Ladai

GENL 1149 Panch Bhoot

SPCL 240 Bachao bachao

SPCL 244 Mumbai Pareshan

SPCL 250 Death Dot Com

GENL 1160 Speed Meri Dushman

GENL 1171 Mahavinashak

SPCL 265 Itna Bada Kobi

GENL 1178 Shakti Khatm

GENL 1181 Bacha Duniya

GENL 1191 Khatra Uthana Padega

GENL 1197 Tera Kaal

SPCL 303 Morcha

GENL 1201 Nashini

SPCL 308 Antim Yudh

GENL 1205 Bhairavi

SPCL 318 Bharhamand Rakshak

GENL 1211 Mayavi

GENL 1214 Krodh

SPCL 340 Jag Utha Shaitan

GENL 1222 Kali Chaya

SPCL 342 Operation Mangal

GENL 1227 Maut Ka Mazak

SPCL 354 Phir Aaya Ithihas

GENL 1231 Pretaa

GENL 1234 Tabahi

GENL 1237 Maut Ke Putle

SPCL 376 Aa Maut Mujhe Maar

SPCL 379 Pratibandh

SPCL 384 Char Chandaal

SPCL 390 Pakistan Zindabad

SPCL 391 Sava Lakh Se Ek Ladaun

SPCL 393 Jadugar

SPCL 394 Mujhe Chaand Chahiye

SPCL 407 Maharani

SPCL 408 Totka

SPCL 416 Kaal dharpan

SPCL 420 Kolahal

SPCL 430 Daav Par Duniya

SPCL 436 Yug Hatyara

SPCL 448 Jaal Aur Chaal

SPCL 459 Kalsarpa

SPCL 473 Baap Ka Raaj Hai

SPCL 486 Nash

SPCL 504 Anhoni na ho Jaye

SPCL 509 Trikali

SPCL 522 Kaal aur Doga

SPCL 533 Kaal Aur Kali

SPCL 525 Sarv Shaktimaan

SPCL 557 Bhujangnath

SPCL 567 Gulvira

SPCL 579 Woh Chehra

SPCL 592 Vidhwa ka Pati

SPCL 585 Chakra

SPCL 619 Bankelal aur Kalyug

SPCL 636 Villain Chacha

SPCL 696 Palda

SPCL 2233 Ek Se Badhkar Ek

== Other Appearances ==
- Fang Magazine
- World Comics & Graphic Novels News (WCGNN)
- Shakti (Trendy Baba Series, Book # 03)
- Indian Comics Fandom Magazine
- Vigyapans (Trendy Baba Series, Book # 07)

== Discussion Forum ==
Raj Comics hosts a discussion forum, with a section specially devoted to Shakti.

- Forum by Raj Comics
