= Inspector Steel =

Steel

Publication information
- Publisher: Raj Comics
- First appearance: Inspector Steel(1995)
- Created by: Naresh Kumar, Lalit Sing, Pradeep Sherawat

In-story information
- Alter ego: Amar
- Team affiliations: P.O.E.M.
- Notable aliases: supercop
- Abilities: Cybernetic Enhancement grants: Superhuman Intelligence; Superhuman strength; Superhuman speed; Superhuman stamina; Superhuman endurance; Superhuman durability; Automatic bullet and rocket firing Megagun; Advanced sensory systems and scanners; Lie detector; X-ray vision; Inbuilt weaponry

Inspector Steel is an Indian comic book superhero character published by Raj Comics.

== Origin ==
Inspector Amar lost some major parts of his body after an accident. In order to save his life, his brain was placed into a mechanical body; making him a cyborg. His friend, Professor Anees, was the one who performed this operation.

Inspector Steel is composed of armor plating, ICs, chips, various weapon systems, and electronic wizardry. The only human part within him is his brain, which is wired to the rest of the systems.

== Attributes ==
Height: 7 feet (2.1 m)

Weight: 450 kg (1,000 lb)

Mainframe : Stainless steel

Age: 5 years as Ins. Steel

Area of Operation : Raj Nagar

Rank : Police Inspector

== Powers and abilities ==
He is a heavily armored cyborg who cannot be harmed by simple weapons. He has x-ray vision, a fully automatic bullet and rocket firing Megagun, scanners and many digital equipments such as a lie detector machine, fax etc. built in. Normal bullets and bombs can not harm him. His body is completely resistive to any outside interference. Being a heavily armored cyborg, he can run at superhuman speed and also, he uses his own stunning bike which is made up of automatic built-up system.

== Family, Friends, and Allies ==
- Inspector Salma
- Professor Anees

== Enemies ==
- Dr virus
- Mechanic, a man who hates machines
- Hammer
- Farsa
- Sir Gunga
- Auzaar
