= Raj Comics =

Indian comic book publisher company

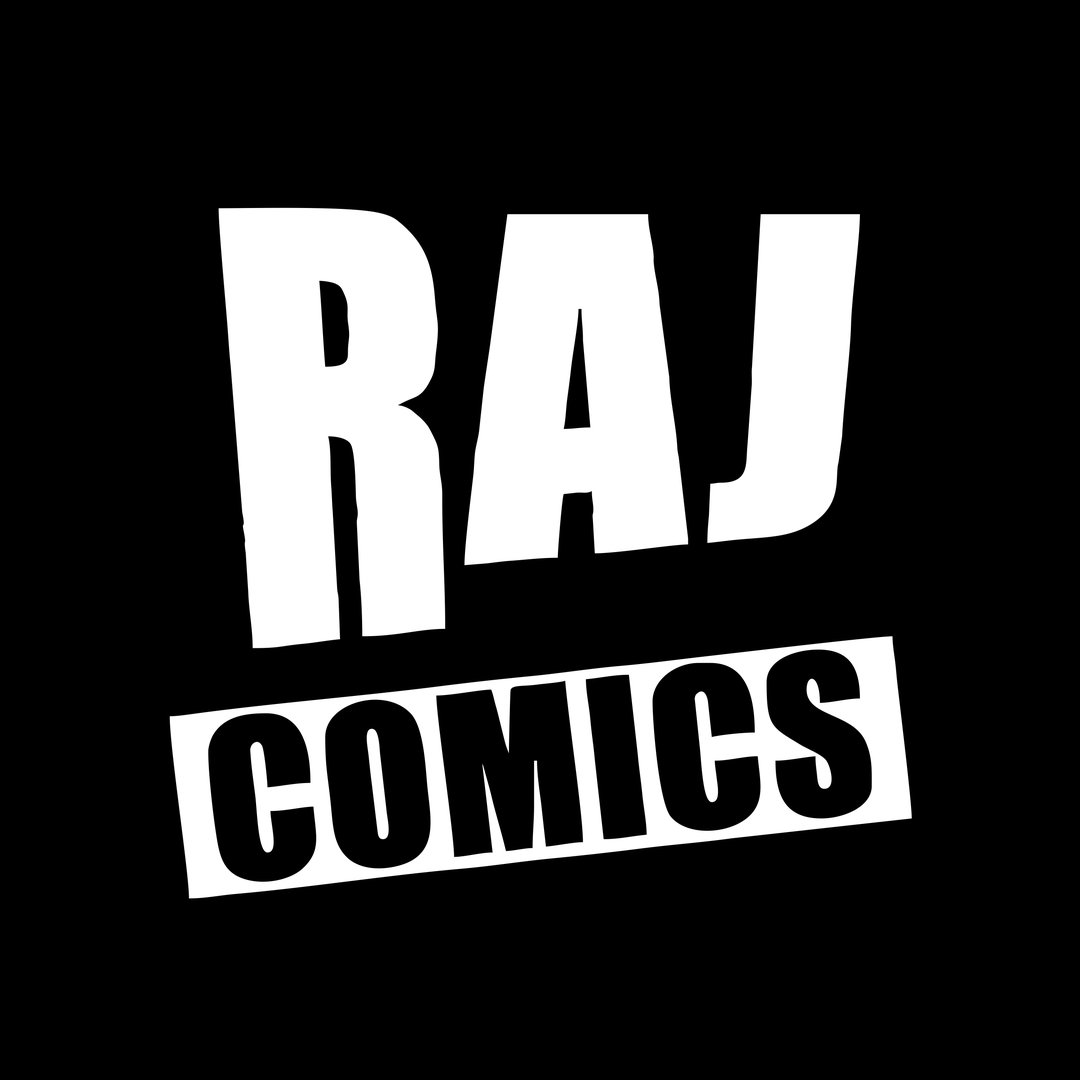
- New logo of Raj Comics in English
- Parent company: Raja Pocket Books
- Status: Active
- Founded: 1984; 42 years ago
- Founder: Rajkumar Gupta; Manoj Gupta; Sanjay Gupta
- Country of origin: India
- Headquarters location: 330/1 Main Road Burari, New Delhi, India
- Key people: Rajkumar Gupta; Sanjay Gupta; Manoj Gupta; Anupam Sinha; Jolly Sinha; Bedi; Tarun Kumar Wahi
- Publication types: Comics; Books
- Fiction genres: Superhero; Science fiction; Fantasy; Action; Adventure
- Official website: www.rajcomics.net

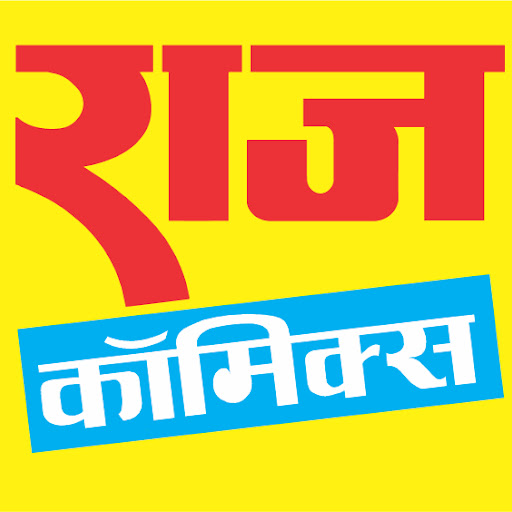
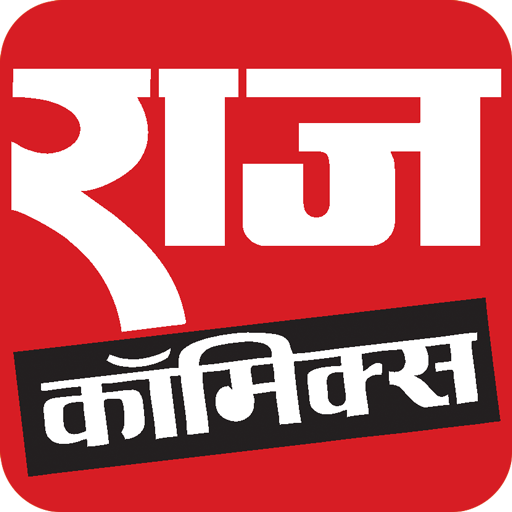
Logos of Raj Comics.

Raj Comics is an Indian comic book publisher based in New Delhi, India. It had published a line of Indian comic books through Raja Pocket Books since its foundation in 1984 by Rajkumar Gupta, Manoj Gupta, and Sanjay Gupta. Some of its most well known characters include Nagraj, Super Commando Dhruva, Bhokal, Doga, Parmanu, Tiranga, Bankelal, Shakti, Inspector Steel, Ashwaraj, Bheriya and Anthony. Raja Pocket Books is a leading comic book distributor in India.

Raja Pocket Books is a partnership firm based in Burari, Delhi. It is the holding company for the intellectual property rights of multiple eminent Indian Brands such as Raj Comics, King Comics, Tausi Comics, etc. Raja Pocket Books was established in the 1980s. It is a family owned enterprise. There are various litigations ongoing in respect to the assets of this company between the owners of the firm, due to which business operations of the same have been disrupted. Raja Pocket Books initially published pulp-fiction books. They had a highly-successful run and published critically acclaimed authors like Surender Mohan Pathak, Ved Prakash Sharma, Anil Mohan and Raja. At their peak, the books sold up to 1 million copies each. While Rajkumar Gupta always had a passion for crime-thrillers, his sons Sanjay Gupta, and Manoj Gupta were always thrilled with the idea of creating original Indian Superheroes. One evening, while discussing the same, Rajkumar Gupta walked in on the conversation of the three brothers and thus, Raj Comics was born.

The company mainly publishes four types of comics; medieval fantasy, horror, mystery, and superhero comics, with a predominant focus on superhero content. Their comics are usually published in Hindi, with only a few titles and special editions in English. It has produced close to 35,000 comics to date and has been read by people in India and abroad. The company also publishes an online exclusive web series named Raj Rojana, with a new page uploaded every day.

Raj Comics publishes in multiple formats, which include e-book, print, and motion comics. The company also sells hardcovers of their old and new comics, as well as bundled collections of their characters.

In 2008, Raj Comics was the focus of a research project conducted through The Sarai Programme at CSDS's Sarai Media Lab. The resulting research was published as a free PDF on the Sarai website.

== Team ==
- Raj Gupta (Founder & Chairman)
- Manoj Gupta (Partner)
- Sanjay Gupta (Co-Founder, Partner)
- Vivek Mohan (Editor)
- Anupam Sinha (Creative Director)
- Tarun Kumar Wahi (Chief Writer)
- Jolly Sinha (Writer)
- Ajit Singh (Territory Manager)
- Parul Gupta (Partner)
- Meenu Gupta (Partner)
- Prem Lata Gupta (Partner)

== Characters ==
Heroes of Raj Comics Drawn by Lalit Singh, color by Pradeep Sherawat

=== Members of team Brahmand Rakshak (Protectors of the Universe) ===
- Bheriya
- Nagraj
- Super Commando Dhruva
- Doga
- Parmanu
- Shakti
- Inspector Steel
- Tiranga
- Super Indian
- Pret Uncle
- Ashwaraj
- Bhokal
- Anthony
- yodha

=== Members of team Research and Investigation Paranormalism [RIP] ===
- Gagan
- Vinashdoot
- Monty
- Tahira

=== Characters based in ancient times ===
- Bhokal
- Gojo - the host for 7 mystical beings with various powers.
- Ashwaraj
- Yoddha
- Tilismadev
- Prachanda
- Shukral
- Adig

=== Comedy characters ===
- Bankelal
- Gamraj
- Fighter Toads

=== Chhota Nagraj and Amazing Friends of Nagraj ===
- Vishaank/Chhota Nagraj
- Sillu/Cybro
- Shama/Flemina
- Durdamya Sena Panchnaag- Naagdev, Sarpraj, Naagpreti, Sinhanaag and Naagarjun
- Shooldharini Saudangi
- Amar Yoddha Kaaldoot
- Nag Veerangana Visarpi

=== Kids Series characters (Defunct) ===
- Bobby
- Tuffy
- Cherry
- Damru
- Anadi

=== Member of Vistrit Rakshak (Extended Protectors of the Universe) ===
- Ninjadev Kirigi
- Nakshatra
- Samri
- Dhananjay
- Chandika
- Jingaalu
- Faceless
- Visarpi
- Kaaldoot
- Blackcat
- Pralayanka
- Cancer

=== Members of W.A.R (World Allied Rescuers) ===
- Badman
- Nakshatra
- Kali Vidhwa
- Inspector Cheetah
- Sheena
- Black Cat
- Lomri
- Madam X
- Kirtiman
- Adrishya Hatyara
- Vanputra
- Doctor Vargis

=== Member of P.V.N (Paralaukik Vigyan Nayakgan) ===
- Vedacharya
- Facelace (Bharti)
- Kapalkundli
- Nostradamus
- Lori
- Kishore
- Saza (Venu)
- Red Letter (Vikram)
- Baby
- Iri

=== Superheroes from Different World ===
- Narak Nashak Nagraj
- Krodh Ketu Kobi
- Danadan Doga
- Doga Reborn
- Swatantrata Senani Dhruva
- Show Stopper Dhruva
- Ant henn Anthony

=== Newest characters ===
- Sanju (10 Deadliest)
- Yugam (Sarvnayak Series) (Akhri Series)
- Adig (Sarvnayak Series) (Akhri Series)
- Paryaava (Sarvnayak Series) (Akhri Series)
- Aghori (Sarvnayak Series) (Aghori Agyat)
- Narakputra raksh (Sarvnayak Series)

=== Inactive characters ===
- Hunter Sharks
- Khayali Ram
- Raja
- Johar
- Barrister Vishwanath
- Aglu Pichlu
- Khaleel Khan
- Anadi

=== Inactive characters who came after a long time ===
- Bobby
- Tuffy
- Cherry
- Damru
- Abhedya
- Blind Death
- Liza
- Vega
- Jasoos Topichand
- Piddi Pahalwan
- Sanju (10 Deadliest)
- Fighter Toads
- Pret Uncle
- Tausi
- Bhootnaath (Nutan Comics) (Sarvaayudh by Manoj Gupta)
- Raka (Nutan Comics) (Sarvaayudh by Manoj Gupta)
- Goldheart
- Jaadugar
- Vakra (After HUM HONGEY KAMYAB)
- Meghdoot

=== TV show-based characters ===
- Shaktimaan
- Viraat

== History ==
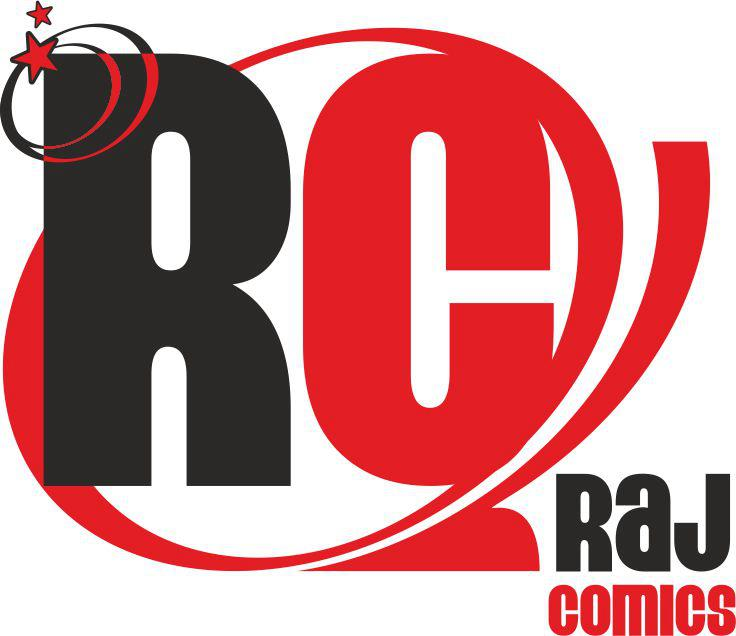
Original logo of Raj Comics in English

Raj Comics was founded in 1986 by Raj Kumar Gupta, Sanjay Gupta, and Manoj Gupta. Raj Comics's first superhero was Nagraj. Later, they launched other popular superheroes like Dhruva, Doga, Parmanu, and Tiranga.

=== Origins ===
In 1985, Manoj Gupta came up with the idea of creating a superhero centered around snakes as snakes hold a religious and mythological significance in India. Later, the team started working on the concept and finally created Nagraj.

=== The Golden Age ===
In 1997, an advertisement for Nagraj featuring Sonu Sood aired on TV. During this era, Raj Comics reportedly sold over a million copies a year, making it one of the most widespread publications of that time period. It has sold more than 100 million copies since then.

=== Modern Age ===
Raj Comics has now expanded to multiple different publication streams, with TriColor and other various business entities taking steps in penetrating the Indian book market. Discussions with studio heads have been disclosed to the public about the possibility of live feature films based on comic universe. However, nothing has come to fruition.

In 2015, Raj Comics released an Android app for the general public. It has since garnered a massive following and has an average rating of 4.5+ stars.

In 2017, Raj Comics released a concept trailer for Nagraj on its official YouTube channel. It has since garnered over 1.5 million views.

In 2018, Raj Comics released a short feature film named Aadamkhor, partially self-produced and crowdfunded on YouTube.

In or around 2019, Raj Comics released a short feature film named 'Doga - Mumbai Ka Rakhwala', self-produced on Youtube.

== Series ==
=== King Comics ===
King Comics was a monthly line of comics published through Raja Pocket Books. While the division was initially successful, its popularity declined and the line went defunct after only about 2–5 years of activity. It was intended that many of King Comic's characters would be merged into Raj Comics, but only Gamraj was successfully merged. During its run, the division published six monthly comics.

=== Past and current series ===
- Kaliyug (Shakti, Nagraj & Dhruva)
- Tune Mara doga ko (Doga)
- Thrill-Horror-Suspense Series
- Huoooo-Series
- X-Series
- Friendy Series
- Goldheart Series
- Kaal Series (Ashwaraj, Gojo, Bhokal, TilismDev, Parmanu, Ins. Steel, Super Indian)
- Nagayan Series (Nagraj-Super Commando Dhruv)
- AmarPrem Series (Kobi-Bheriya-Bhokal)
- Japan Series (Atankharta Nagraj)
- City Without A Hero (Multistar)
- Khazana series (vishwa Rakshak Nagraj)
- Trifana Series (Nagraj)
- Maharavan Series (Bhokal)
- Dracula Series (Multistar)
- Narak Nashak Nagraj origin Series (Narak Nashak Nagraj)
- Crow Series (Anthony)
- Born In Blood Series (Doga)
- Express Way Series (Doga)
- Aatankawadi nagraj series (Multistarrer)
- Chamatakari bhokal series (Bhokal)
- Mard aur murda series (Doga-antony)
- Mahanagayan series
- Parmatma series (Parmanu)
- Raktadaan series (Doga)
- Jalyash series (Bankelal)
- Tilismi olympic series (Bhokal)
- Raj 20 (Amazing friends of nagraj)
- Nagraj ke badd series (Nagraj)
- Swarna nagri (Nagraj-Super Commando Dhruv- fighter toads)
- Belmunda ka khajana series (Nagraj-Super Commando Dhruv- Fighter Toads)
- Genius series (Super commando dhurva)
- Aadamkhoro ka swaraga series (Super commando dhurva)
- Axe series (Super commando dhurva)
- Aakhri dhurva series (Super commando dhurva)
- Pagal nagraj series (Nagraj)
- Made in India series (Ins.Steel)
- Wafa series (Doga)
- Doga diries series (Doga)
- Doga collection series (Doga)
- Mritiyjivi series (Narak nashak nagraj)
- Makbara series (Narak nashak nagraj-gagan-Vinashdoot-tahira- Monty)
- Kar Bura ho Bhala series (Bankelal)
- Aag series (Tiranga)
- Tandoor series (Doga)
- Bankelal lok se lok series (bankelal)
- Bankelal nagar se nagar series (Bankelal)
- Nagina series (Nagraj)
- Nahi bachega nagraj series (Nagraj)
- Rajnagar rakshak series (Super commando dhurva- Ins. Steel)
- Curfew series (Doga)
- Aarambha series (Yoddha)
- Hedron series (Nagraj-Super Commando Dhurva)
- Champion killer series (Super commando dhurva)
- Guru bhokal series (Bhokal)
- Game over series (Super commando dhurva)
- Andhi maut series (Super commando dhurva)
- Aagraj series (Nagraj)
- Doga Hindu Hai Series (Doga)
- Khoon series (Doga-Super Indian)
- Palra series (Multistarrer)
- Mai hu bheriya series (Bheriya- Nagraj-Super Commando Dhruv - Doga- Parmanu)
- Ins.chetta series (Doga)
- Nikal pada doga series (Doga)
- Nagraj hai na series (Nagraj)
- Lavva series (Nagraj)
- Hatyara kaun series (Super commando dhurva)
- Candakaal series (Super commando dhurva)
- Khoni khandan series (Super commando dhurva)
- Aab marega parmanu series (Parmanu)
- Lakshya purusha series (Doga)
- Ek katora au Do Ktora Khoon series (Thrill-Horror-Suspense)
- Chamatakari bhokal series (Bhokal)
- Jalyash series (Bankelal)
- Germany series (Aatakharta nagraj)
- Italy series (Aatakharta nagraj)
- Raktabeej series (Multistarrer)
- Doga unmulan series (Doga)
- Rajnagar Rakshak (Super Commando Dhruva, Inspector Steel)
- Akhiri-Last Survivors(Multistarrer)
- Balcharit (Origin Series of Super Commando Dhruva)
- Shaktiroopa (Follow up to Super Commando Dhruva's Balcharit)

=== Ongoing series ===
- Sarvanayak (Nearly all major RC characters)
- Sarvanayak Vistar (Multistarrer)
- Kshatipoorti (Aatankharta Nagraj)
- Sarpsatra (Vishwarakshak Nagraj)
- Naag Granth (Narak Nashak Nagraj and Krodh Ketu Kobi)
- पुनरूत्थान (Multistarrer)
- महा-नागायण (Multistarrer)
- Shuddhikaran (Kobi - Bhediya)

=== Upcoming series ===
- Prem Granth (Super Commando Dhruva)
- Sins of the father (Anthony-Multistarrer)
- Adharmeshwar (Multistarrer)
- अगड़म-बगड़म (Bankeylal, Nagraj, Dhruv)
- फाइटर फोर्स (Fighter Toads)
- डेड गॉड्स (Multistarrer)

=== Social Comics ===
- Nagraj Strikes: The Attack of the Coronaman
- Super Commando Dhruva: The Struggle with Depression

== Jubilee and Kalpana-lok awards ==
In 2010, Raj Comics celebrated its Silver Jubilee by launching the Kalpana-lok Awards to honor comics artists. Participants are nominated by editors at Raj Comics and can be voted on by readers and fans on the Raj Comics website.

== Raj Comics films ==
In 2014, Anurag Kashyap had spoken about making a film on Doga—a vigilante killing machine in the style of Marvel Comics’ The Punisher—but the project was shelved after his Bombay Velvet flopped. In 2016, Raj Comics co-founder and studio head Sanjay Gupta said "Bollywood is yet to warm up to the idea of licensing comic book characters that come with detailed universes and visuals ready for the screen. We want to start with animated Web series first. We are expecting to make our first live-action film the year after.” In December 2017, Raj Comics organized special screening of their horror film Aadamkhor at Nagraj Janmotsav event, Delhi. Aadamkhor is based on comic of the same name published by Raj Comics in 1992. Raj comics released Aadamkhor on YouTube on 24 May 2018.

In December 2019, Manoj Gupta said that he was in negotiations with Ranveer Singh to play Nagraj in a film produced by Karan Johar.

== Digital distribution ==
Raj Comics are available in digital form through their android app. The Raj Comics official android app has reached over 100k+ downloads at the time of this article. Free Services: In 2017, Raj Comics started free comics from their android app.

Paid Services: Google Play in 2017. RC Android app crossed 100,000 downloads within 6 months of its launch.

== Legal history ==
In 1996, delivered by the Delhi High Court under docket Raja Pocket Books (Plaintiff) v. Radha Pocket Books, Raj Comics won this intellectual property case with a ruling of "prima facie infringement of the plaintiff’s character."
