= Rama (character) =

DC Comics character

- Rama from Wonder Woman #151, artist Matthew Clark.

Publication information
- Publisher: DC Comics
- First appearance: Wonder Woman (vol. 2) #148 (September 1999)
- Created by: Eric Luke (writer); Yanick Paquette (artist)

In-story information
- Alter ego: Rama Chandra
- Team affiliations: Hindu Gods; Justice League
- Abilities: Superhuman strength, speed, stamina, durability, senses, agility, and reflexes; Magic; Flight; Immortality; Mystical weaponry

Rama is a character based on Hindu Avatar Rama published by DC Comics, and a potential love interest of Wonder Woman. He first appeared in Wonder Woman #148 series 2 (September 1999) and was created by Eric Luke and Yanick Paquette.

== Fictional character biography ==
Rama-Chandra is the seventh avatar of the Hindu god Vishnu, born a prince on Earth in ancient times. In the Indian epic Ramayana, he vanquished the demon king Ravana, who had captured his consort Sita.

Rama meets Wonder Woman after Cronus, the Hecatoncheires, and the Cyclopes ransack Mount Olympus and attempts to destroy the Hindu gods. The Child of Cronus known as Oblivion traps Rama and Wonder Woman in a dream realm where the two are married. This illusion is shattered when Diana defeats Oblivion, but Rama remains infatuated with her. Rama eventually leaves for parts unknown after going berserk while battling a human who was mutated by Doctor Poison.

== Powers and abilities ==
As an avatar of the Hindu god Vishnu, Rama possesses the power of flight. He wields a sword and the bow of Vayu, which shoots flaming arrows. When his life is in danger, Rama is able to enter a berserker rage that heals his wounds and cures all toxins. While berserk, he removes his crown to expose his third eye and grows two extra arms, resembling Kali.

== See also ==
- List of Wonder Woman supporting characters
