= Bhokal =

- Bhokal as in "Guru Bhokal" series

Publication information
- Publisher: Raj Comics
- Created by: Manoj Gupta; Sanjay Gupta

In-story information
- Alter ego: Alop
- Abilities: Formerly Powers : Psychic powers; Flight via wings on his back; At present, Powers are : Superhuman strength; Superhuman speed; Superhuman leaping; Highly skilled Swordsman; Armour; Flight via Shield

Bhokal is a comic book superhero character appearing in Raj Comics. Most stories are based on dark fantasy with blood and gore. Bhokal was created by Sanjay Gupta.

== Story Plot ==
He is a legendary winged warrior prince of a fictional fabled Parilok (fairyland). He descended to earth to take part in a fighting tournament and landed in Vikasnagar, becoming a zealous defender of the people of Vikasnagar.

== Origin ==
Real name Rajkumar Alop (Prince Alop), Bhokal appeared first in a seven comic series along with his friends Tureen (with whom he falls in love), Shootan and Atikrur. He killed his rival Fuchang who was responsible for death of his parents. Presently Bhokal's parental origins are being explored in the latest issues starting from 'Dhikkar' where Bhokal loses his powers as a result of a conspiracy planned by his master and mentor Mahaguru Bhokal. In issues 'Dhikkar' and 'Antardwand' Bhokal battles to retain his powers as well as find and clear name of his biological father 'Yuddheshthveer'. His quest to find his father continues in 'Yugaandhar'. Mr. Nitin Mishra is writing the origin series for Bhokal, Dhikkar and Antardwand were its debut issues which were illustrated by Mr. Hemant Kumar. Yugaandhar is illustrated by Mr. Lalit Singh and Mr. Nitin Mishra, it is written by Mr. Nitin Mishra.

Bhokal also appeared in issues of Bankelal.

== Powers and abilities ==
Bhokal can summon the 'Bhokal-Shakti', the power of his teacher, Mahaguru Bhokal, by hailing his name in battle, shouting 'Jai Mahaguru Bhokal'. He acquires super-human physical attributes, apart from receiving the mystical Sword and Shield of his master. The Sword is capable of cutting through most of the then-known materials and elements, making it one of the greatest weapons of its time. It can also be used to emit 'Jwala-Shakti', a mystical fire from its edge, which is known to burn away almost anything in a matter of seconds. The Shield is capable of blocking any physical or supernatural attack and also allows its wielder to fly via the Shield. He once wielded the weapon Prahara on his forehead, in memory of its previous owner and Bhokal's deceased wife, Turin. It granted him psychic powers.

== Supporting characters ==
=== Friends and relations ===
- Turin: a.k.a. Rajkumari Sofia (princess Sofia). Turin is a princess from another planet. First love interest of Bhokal and later became his wife. Turin was the owner of the magical weapon prahara and master of a magical cat "Kapala". Turin was killed by Himraj in the Himalayan valleys. Bhokal was out in the battlefields fighting for his adopted country and could not save her. Later in Saat Sawaal he goes in search of her soul and finally he gets back his beloved Turin in Laut Aayi Turin. Turin left Bhokal after Saloni and Rupsi became pregnant with Bhokal's child. Later on it was found that, Maya controlled Bhokal's mind to destroy his reputation and his relationship with Turin.
- Kapala Turin's shape shifting cat which can fly. She took a human female form with cat's eye to save Turin's son after Turin was killed.
- Rupsi: Niece of Vikasmohan and princess of neighbouring kingdom. Bhokal had another child with Rupsi under Maya's influence.
- Saloni:(a skilled archer) Daughter of a sage. Although he never loved the other two as much as he loved Turin, bound by vow to protect them, he can never leave them. Under the mind control of Jadugarni Maya (enchantress Maya) Bhokal had twins with Saloni.
- Shootan was the sammohan-samrat ... who could hypnotise anyone and anything with his eyes. Shootan was killed by his enemies in Chitaghati. But after many years he came back in Ghar Aaya Shootan when Bhokal's uncle tried to take over his homeland and in the process resurrected Shootan as to kill Bhokal but eventually Shootan freed from his will and thus returned completely as older self. In "Sammohan Ghat" the royal warlock Tillu tried to impersonate Shootan as enemy of Vikasnagar but was eventually caught.
- Mohini: Queen of Vikasnagar. She became the sole ruler after her husband Vikasmohan was killed by Jadugarni Maya.
- Venu who started her career as a child-kidnapper but after falling in love with Shootan transformed herself for the better and then fought many a battle alongside her husband, Bhokal, Turin, etc., she carried a flute that could mesmerise anybody and get converted into a battle axe if summoned.
- Ladaki Shootan's second wife. Skilled in armed combat.
- Atikrur, the wielder of the dantak has the strength of 10 elephants and can flatten mountains with his blows. But later on his appearances with Bhokal dwindled after he went back to his planet.
- Piku Pakodia wife of Atikrur
- Tilli Once Bhokal and Turin was almost brutally stoned by the people of Vikasnagar. Tilli with his tantrik energy, revived both of them from near death.
- Shweta Teen princess of Vikasnagar
- Ankit Prince of Vikasnagar
- Vikasmohan King of Vikasnagar
- Rani Chanda Obsessive suitor of Bhokal.

=== Enemies ===
Incomputable enemies of Bhokal have appeared in Bhokal's comics; many died, but some lived on to appear again. Here is the list of Bhokal's major enemies :

- Fuchang : Appears in First seven Comics of Bhokal, Fuchang is the murderer of Bhokal's Family, Killed by Bhokal in comics "Bhokal Aur Fuchang"
- Himraj
- Guneek
- Kaal-Kundli
- Dharni-Dhar
- Maharavan
- Kaal
- Chaddam
- Kubda Shaitan
- Rani Maya
- Baba Yaga
- Shootan

== New Bhokal : Pari Rakshak Bhokal ==
In order to publish something for the kids, Raj comics has started publishing a new series namely Pari Rakshak Bhokal. This Bhokal is entirely different from the original one but has the same powers. And story also takes place in the present Rc universe.

== List of Bhokal Comics ==
SL NO	ISSUE NO	NAME	PUBLICATION DATE	SERIES	Pages
1	GENL-0292	KHOFNAAK KHEL	1992	ORIGIN SERIES	32
2	GENL-0302	TILISMI OLAMPAAK	1992	ORIGIN SERIES	32
3	GENL-0305	BHOKAAL	1992	ORIGIN SERIES	32
4	GENL-0312	SHUTAAN	1992	ORIGIN SERIES	32
5	GENL-0321	ATIKROOR	1992	ORIGIN SERIES	32
6	GENL-0325	BHOKAL TILISM MEIN	1992	ORIGIN SERIES	32
7	GENL-0331	TILISM TOOT GAYA	1992	ORIGIN SERIES	32
8	GENL-0336	BHOKAAL AUR FUCHANG	1992	ORIGIN SERIES	32
9	GENL-0340	ATIKRUR AUR GAJOKH	1992	ORIGIN SERIES	32
10	GENL-0345	VIKANDA	1992	ORIGIN SERIES	32
11	GENL-0355	SABSE BADA HATYARA	1992	ORIGIN SERIES	32
12	GENL-0360	PIKU PAKODIA	1992	ORIGIN SERIES	32
13	GENL-0365	TUREEN	1992	ORIGIN SERIES	32
14	GENL-0370	KAPAALA	1992	ORIGIN SERIES	32
15	GENL-0382	JAHAR GHATI	1992	ORIGIN SERIES	32
16	GENL-0389	SHUTAAN KI SHAADI	1993	ORIGIN SERIES	32
17	GENL-0410	SHAITAAN BUDDHHE	1993	ORIGIN SERIES	32
18	GENL-0440	TEEN CHUDAILEN	1993	ORIGIN SERIES	32
19	GENL-0455	TANTRA	1993	ORIGIN SERIES	32
20	GENL-0475	CHAMATKARI BHOKAAL	1993	CHAMATKARI BHOKAAL SERIES	32
21	GENL-0481	MAHAGURU BHOKAAL	1993	CHAMATKARI BHOKAAL SERIES	32
22	GENL-0491	SHAKTISHALI	1993	CHAMATKARI BHOKAAL SERIES	32
23	SPCL-0018	BHOKAAL KI TALWAR	1993	CHAMATKARI BHOKAAL SERIES	64
24	GENL-0504	MAHAYODDHHA	1994	CHAMATKARI BHOKAAL SERIES	32
25	GENL-0516	PAATAAL HATYARA	1994	CHAMATKARI BHOKAAL SERIES	32
26	GENL-0518	NARAK JAAL	1994	CHAMATKARI BHOKAAL SERIES	32
27	GENL-0538	VAJRA	1994	CHAMATKARI BHOKAAL SERIES	32
28	GENL-0543	KAALI KANTHI	1994	CHAMATKARI BHOKAAL SERIES	32
29	GENL-0558	JWALA SHAKTI	1994	PARAKRAMI SERIES	32
30	SPCL-0034	KHATRON KI DHARTI	1994	PARAKRAMI SERIES	64
31	GENL-0569	SHAITAAN VRIKSH	1995	PARAKRAMI SERIES	32
32	GENL-0579	BHOKAAL KA BHUKAMP	1995	PARAKRAMI SERIES	32
33	GENL-0587	BAWANDAR	1995	PARAKRAMI SERIES	32
34	GENL-0599	MAIN HATYARA HOON	1995	PARAKRAMI SERIES	32
35	GENL-0611	PARAKRAMI	1995	PARAKRAMI SERIES	32
36	GENL-0617	KILAARI KAA RAHASYA	1995	MAYAJAAL SERIES	32
37	GENL-0628	CHEETA NAGRI	1995	MAYAJAAL SERIES	32
38	GENL-0632	TUREEN KI JANG	1995	MAYAJAAL SERIES	32
39	GENL-0648	YE SHADYANTRA HAI	1995	SHAADI SERIES	32
40	SPCL-0055	MAYAJAAL	1995	MAYAJAAL SERIES	64
41	GENL-0659	HATYA KARUNGA MAIN	1996	SHAADI SERIES	32
42	GENL-0668	ATMAHATYA	1996	SHAADI SERIES	32
43	GENL-0680	TILISMA	1996	UTTAR PARINAY SERIES	32
44	GENL-0687	KUBDA SHAITAAN	1996	UTTAR PARINAY SERIES	32
45	GENL-0697	KAUN BANEGA RAJA	1996	YUDDHA SERIES	32
46	GENL-0702	YUDDHHA JEETUNGA	1996	YUDDHA SERIES	32
47	GENL-0707	BHOKAAL NAHIN HAAREGA	1996	YUDDHA SERIES	32
48	GENL-0723	BHOKAAL GAYAB	1996	YUDDHA SERIES	32
49	GENL-0727	JAL UTHA REGISTAAN	1996	YUDDHA SERIES	32
50	GENL-0736	RET KAA BHOKAAL	1996	YUDDHA SERIES	32
51	SPCL-0062	SHAADI NAHI HOGI	1996	SHAADI SERIES	64
52	SPCL-0066	KACHHUA MAHAL	1996	UTTAR PARINAY SERIES	64
53	SPCL-0070	BAUNA BHOKAAL	1996	YUDDHA SERIES	64
54	SPCL-0076	SHAITAN BETA	1996	YUDDHA SERIES	64
55	SPCL-0077	VIKAT VYUHA	1996	YUDDHA SERIES	64
56	GENL-0755	MAR GAYA SHOOTAAN	1997	AAKHRI NISHANI SERIES	32
57	GENL-0771	ATYACHAARI	1997	AAKHRI NISHANI SERIES	32
58	GENL-0791	CHUDAIL MAA	1997	MAHARAAVAN SERIES	32
59	GENL-0795	DIVYASTRA	1997	MAHARAAVAN SERIES	32
60	SPCL-0082	YUDDHA NAHI LADOONGA	1997	YUDDHA SERIES	64
61	SPCL-0083	BUDDHI PANSA	1997	YUDDHA SERIES	64
62	SPCL-0087	AAKHRI NISHANI	1997	AAKHRI NISHANI SERIES	64
63	SPCL-0095	KAALKOOT	1997	MAHARAAVAN SERIES	64
64	SPCL-0097	MRITYUJEET	1997	MAHARAAVAN SERIES	64
65	SPCL-0099	DANKINI	1997	MAHARAAVAN SERIES	64
66	SPCL-0103	KAPALIKA	1997	MAHARAAVAN SERIES	64
67	GENL-0902	DHARNIDHAR	1998	UTTAR MAHARAAVAN SERIES	32
68	GENL-0910	VISHWA RAKSHAK	1998	UTTAR MAHARAAVAN SERIES	32
69	GENL-0912	LAGHU GHATI	1998	UTTAR MAHARAAVAN SERIES	32
70	GENL-0920	RAKTPAAT	1998	UTTAR MAHARAAVAN SERIES	32
71	GENL-0940	GURU DAKSHINA	1998	UTTAR MAHARAAVAN SERIES	32
72	SPCL-0107	KALANK	1998	MAHARAAVAN SERIES	64
73	SPCL-0112	MAHAYUDDHA	1998	MAHARAAVAN SERIES	64
74	SPCL-0114	MAHARAVAN	1998	MAHARAAVAN SERIES	64
75	GENL-0950	DURGAMA	1999		32
76	GENL-0960	MRITYUNJAY	1999		32
77	GENL-0970	LAKSHYA	1999		32
78	GENL-0980	GURUTWA	1999		32
79	GENL-0990	GUNEEK	1999		32
80	GENL-0994	FANSI DO BHOKAAL KO	1999		32
81	GENL-1008	RAN CHHOD	1999		32
82	GENL-1018	CHHADAM	1999	PART 1	32
83	GENL-1024	BHOKAAL KA KAAL	1999	PART 2	32
84	SPCL-0134	MRITYUSANKAT	1999		64
85	SPCL-0144	MOHRA	1999		64
86	SPCL-0148	MAAT	1999		64
87	SPCL-0152	CHAANDAL	1999		64
88	SPCL-0163	BHOKAAL BANA KANKAAL	1999		64
89	GENL-1046	KAAL KUNDALI	2000	PART 1	32
90	GENL-1054	MRITYUYOG	2000	PART 2	32
91	GENL-1071	DIVYA CHARAN	2000		32
92	GENL-1073	ANT	2000		32
93	SPCL-0170	TILISMI NIDRA	2000		64
94	SPCL-0178	JAAL	2000		64
95	SPCL-0182	JAA LALKAAR MAUT KO	2000		64
96	SPCL-0192	VISHARKA	2000		64
97	SPCL-0197	EK AUR BHEESHMA	2000		64
98	SPCL-0208	BHOKAAL BANEGA RAAJA	2000		64
99	SPCL-0218	BHANWAR	2000		64
100	SPCL-0221	SHAITAAN KI MAA	2001		64
101	SPCL-0227	KUNDLA KAA JAAL	2001		64
102	SPCL-0233	SHAKTIHEEN	2001		64
103	SPCL-0236	SHIKANJA	2001		64
104	SPCL-0242	SHAAP	2001		64
105	SPCL-0243	MAYA KA JADOO	2001		64
106	SPCL-0247	BHOOTKAAL	2001		64
107	SPCL-0252	PRAHARA	2001		64
108	SPCL-0258	JANJAAL	2001		64
109	SPCL-0262	RAAJLAKSHMI	2001		64
110	SPCL-0269	TRIKHANDA	2001		64
111	SPCL-0277	DURBHIKSH	2001		64
112	GENL-1200	KALA JANTRI	2002	KALA JANTRI SERIES	32
113	SPCL-0284	BHOKAL MERA GULAAM	2002		64
114	SPCL-0290	BHOKAAL JEET	2002		64
115	SPCL-0299	SABSE BADA MAHABALI	2002		64
116	SPCL-0314	JIGAR KA TUKDA	2002	KALA JANTRI SERIES	64
117	SPCL-0317	CHHAL	2002	KALA JANTRI SERIES	64
118	SPCL-0321	TRIKAAL	2002	KALA JANTRI SERIES	64
119	SPCL-0326	BHOKAAL SHISHYA	2002		64
120	SPCL-0333	BHAG JAA BHOKAAL	2002		64
121	SPCL-0336	SHANI KA PUTRA	2002		64
122	SPCL-0345	MRIT SANJIVANI	2002		64
123	SPCL-0352	MRITYU AAYI	2002		64
124	SPCL-0363	JO JEETA WHO HARA	2003		64
125	SPCL-0370	MARKESH	2003		64
126	SPCL-0381	BHAGYA VIDHATA	2003		64
127	SPCL-0392	TRISHAAP	2003		64
128	SPCL-0405	SAAT SAWAL	2003		80
129	SPCL-0414	LAUT AYI TURIN	2003		64
130	SPCL-0424	MAIN VACHAN DETA HOON	2003		64
131	SPCL-0427	KAAL YATRA	2003		64
132	SPCL-0440	KAAL VASHIBHUT	2003		64
133	SPCL-0452	PUTLA TANTRA	2003		64
134	SPCL-0463	PATAAL VIJETA	2004		64
135	SPCL-0476	MITRAGHAAT	2004		64
136	SPCL-0487	NASHT	2004		64
137	SPCL-0501	KAAL OLAMPAAK	2004		80
138	SPCL-0511	VARDAAN	2004		64
139	SPCL-0517	BHAGO BHOKAAL AAYA	2004		64
140	SPCL-0529	KAAL RAAT	2004		64
141	SPCL-0542	PRITHVI CHHOD BHOKAAL	2004		64
142	SPCL-0553	LUTERA BHOKAAL	2005		64
143	SPCL-0564	SINGHASAN MERA	2005		64
144	SPCL-0576	ASTHI SHASTRA	2005		64
145	SPCL-0589	KHUN KAREGA KHUN	2005		64
146	SPCL-0593	SAPNO KI CHAABI	2005		56
147	SPCL-0602	KACHHUA KAWACH	2005		56
148	SPCL-0609	MRITYUBEEJ	2005		56
149	SPCL-0617	RAAJ KAREGA SHAITAAN	2005		56
150	SPCL-0624	GHAR AYA SHUTAAN	2005		56
151	SPCL-0634	SHAITAN CHAKRA	2005		56
152	SPCL-0649	AMRIT NAHI MILEGA	2006		56
153	SPCL-0658	BHAGYA LEKHNI	2006		56
154	SPCL-0677	LADNA SEEKHO	2006		56
155	SPCL-0679	BISAAT	2006		56
156	SPCL-0688	SAMMOHAN GHAAT	2006		56
157	SPCL-2282	GURU BHOKAL	Jan 28 2008		56
158	SPCL-2322	PARI RAKSHAK BHOKAL	Jun 9 2008		48
159	SPCL-2327	SAAT AJUBE	Jul 18 2008		48
160	SPCL-2332	BABA YAGA	Sep 20 2008		48
161	SPCL-2343	CINDERELLA	Dec 12 2008		48
162	SPCL-2348	NIGHTINGALE	Mar 14 2009		128
163		PRATHAM BHOKAL	2010	PRATHAM BHOKAL	
164		PARI JANAM	2010	PRATHAM BHOKAL	
165		DEV YUDDH	2010	PRATHAM BHOKAL	
166		BHOKAL JANAM	2010	PRATHAM BHOKAL	
167		MAHAGURU BHOKAL	2010	PRATHAM BHOKAL	
168		DHIKKAR	2011	PART 1	
169		ANTARDWAND	2011	PART 2	
170		MRITYU-RATHI	2022	AGNI-PATH SERIES	
171		AGNI-KHAND	2022	AGNI-PATH SERIES	
172		AGNI-VADH	TBA	AGNI-PATH SERIES	

== Pari Rakshak Bhokal : Comics List ==
- Kaal
- Kaal Dansh
- Kaal ka Jaal
- Ant Kaal
- Pari Rakshak Bhokal
- Saat Ajube
- Baba Yaga
- Cindrella
- Nightingale
