= Gamraj =

- Gamraj; Raj Comics

Publication information
- Publisher: Raj Comics

In-story information
- Alter ego: Gamraj
- Team affiliations: Swarga lok
- Notable aliases: Gam
- Abilities: none

Gamraj is an Indian comic book character, one of a number of titles published by Raj Comics.

== Plot summary ==
Gamraj is the fictional son of Yamraj, the god of death in Hindu Mythology. He has been living on earth among normal people as he has been very emotional and sentimental and requested his father to allow him to go and live on earth as he wanted to help the people here. His father permitted him to go but he also sent Yamunda, the buffalo who was the son of Yamraj's buffalo, Mahish. Yamunda has heavenly powers of disappearing and can appear when Gamraj calls him and also he can transform into any vehicle he wants.

On Earth, Gamraj met Shankalu who has been living with his wife Ratalu and their 12 kids who help Gamraj in solving people's problems along with their own (as Yamunda is a regular ride for Shankalu's family).

Lanky likeable teenager who always laughs his troubles away. Gamraj has a knack of inviting troubles and landing himself into the soup. T-shirt and jeans are his standard wear. Bizarre characters confront Gamraj creating hilarious comic scenes laced with suspense and thrills. Helping out poor and down trodden is his habit.

== Attributes ==
Height: 5 ft 10 in (1.78 m)

Weight: 62 kg (137 lb)

Hair: Dark

Eyes: Brown

Nose: Hawkish

Face: longish

== Powers and abilities ==
His power is his pet young bull buffalo Yamunda bestowed with the divine power of transforming into anything wished by his master. Yamunda is a gift to Gamraj from the Gods as an apology for their blunders.

== Family, friends, and allies ==
- Shankalu: Friend and a guy who doubts everything. The pint size is married to a battletank of a woman and has a dozen noisy kids. His home has no space for anything. Making mountains out of molehills is his nature. He lives in poverty. The only valuable thing in his life is his close friendship with Gamraj. He is Gamraj console in comedy.
- Yamunda: The son of Yamraj's mount. A bull buffalo which can transform into anything. The bull has a jolly nature and shares many jokes. Yamunda helps Gamraj take on any trouble through the use of its horns.
- Yamraj: Father And God Of Death as per Hindu Mythology

== Enemies ==
- Loudspeaker: His voice is diabolical. His whispers creates storms, his walk has the effect of exploding bombs and his shriek can cause all hell to break loose. It takes a lot to silence him.
- Sir Fode: Sir Fode is a headcracker. He loves anything that brings a mighty bill. He pays it with a skull-cracker bang on the head of the bill presenter with his own steely head.
- Speed Breaker: He creates phony speed breakers on the roads to benefit goods carriers. The bumps make the carriers spill some of their wads. Speed Breaker lived on spilled goods until Gamraj intervened.

== Comics Title ==
Rs 10 Comic

1. Budiya Ke Baal
2. Khota Sikka
3. Maskhara
4. Tulatod
5. Chaal Khali
6. Kalpurje
7. Teen Tigada
8. Gunde Chuhe
9. Mere Bharat Mahaan
10. Takaat Ke Chor
11. Juta Ji
12. Laddu
13. Doctor Bandar
14. Ladaai Ladaai Maaf Karo
15. Bojh Hatao
16. Gatar Chaurashi
17. Car Chor
18. Polio Gang
19. Doorbeen
20. Mastkalandar
21. Chhotmantar
22. Kali Kalantar
23. Kala Bandar
24. Goggle
25. Ko Kalachi Paki
26. Soldier
27. Adal Badal
28. Tarzan Ka Beta
29. Coolie No. 1
30. Bolo Mere Aaka
31. Anpad Lutera
32. Tap Tap Tapori
33. Roti, Kapda Aur Makaan
34. Pilpila Lala
35. Jaani Dushman

Rs 20 Comic

1. Jungle Me Dungle
2. Hungama
3. Naak Me Dum
4. Mumbai Pareshaan
5. Muhnuchwa
6. Shaitaan Raag
7. Satellite Boss
8. Chakka Jaam
9. Bhoot Polish
10. Beghar
11. Baap Ka Raaz Hai
12. Doari Danda
13. Gunda Gamraj, Khooni Doga
14. Jhagdaloosh
15. Hightech Bhoot
16. Koi Hil Gaya
17. Kar Ya Mar
18. Mapose Ram Bharose
19. Tunna Bhai MBBS
20. Khana Kharaab
21. Jal Surma
22. Budhumaan
23. Jhanda Neecha Rahe Tumhara
24. Clonewar
25. Chitrasen
26. Govinda Aala Re
27. Father Phobia
28. Jhanse Ki Rani
29. Jungle Pandey
30. Remote Man
31. Life Boy
32. Sanki Bhai
33. Cementa

Rs 25 Comic

1. Aa Maut Mujhe Maar

== Other Appearances ==
- World Comics & Graphic Novels News (WCGNN)
- Gamraj (Trendy Baba Series, Book # 05)
- Fang Magazine
- Indian Comics Fandom Magazine
- Vigyapans (Trendy Baba Series, Book # 07)
- Heroes in Real Harsh World Series

== Discussion forum ==
Raj Comics hosts a discussion forum, with a section specially devoted to Gamraj.

- Forum by Raj Comics
