= Pustak Mahal =

Pustak Mahal Publishers is a family-owned company incorporated in 1974. As of 2010, Ram Avatar Gupta is the Chairman of the company. With headquarters at New Delhi, it has branches at Bengaluru, Mumbai, Hyderabad and Patna. It publishes mainly low cost paperback editions on subjects like English learning courses, dictionaries, astrology, palmistry, numerology, beauty care, self-improvement books, books for children, cooking guides, Hindu Mythology, text books etc. and participates in Books fairs arranged in cities like Prayagraj, Visakhapatnam, Beijing etc. Pustak Mahal joined other Indian publishers to protest against scanning and uploading of books by Google under the provisions of Google Book Settlement and filed objections with a New York court during 2010.

== Guide to English Language ==
Pustakal Mahal's publication "Rapidex English Speaking Course" was much sought after by common man of India, who wanted to learn basic English speaking. First printed in 1976 with 3,000 copies, it ran several into reprints and became popular with Indians such as Bank employees, house wives, students trying to learn English, which has become link language of India after its independence.

Indian cricketer Kapil Dev had endorsed the "Rapidex English Speaking Course" in the 1980s.His rustic accent endeared him to Indians who didn’t speak the language and wanted to learn it to get ahead in life. His faith in Rapidex showed them the way. Years later, the cricketer said: "My interest at that stage was not promoting or learning English, But I realised that it inspired many like me to learn a new language."

== World Famous Series ==
Pustak Mahal published a series of titles under the "World Famous" series, covering a spectrum of topics of general interest and curiosity. Some of the noteworthy mentions are World Famous Discoveries, World Famous Unsolved Mysteries, World Famous Adventures, World Famous Ghost Stories, World Famous Scientists, World Famous Escapades, World Famous Treasures, World Famous Supernatural Mysteries. During 1990's around 48 titles under the series were in print in English and Hindi. Subsequently some of the titles were withdrawn while some were reprinted.

== Imprints ==
Pustak Mahal has two imprints. Cedar Books is dedicated to publishing fiction and majority of the authors of Cedar Books are from India. Hindoology Books is another imprint of the company which publishes books on Hindu Mythology, prayer systems and mythology for children.

=== Kindle books ===
The company is one of the first publishers in India to digitalize its publications and more than 300 of titles are in the form of Kindle books.
