= Parmanu =

- Parmanu in Raj Comics' Parmatma series

Publication information
- Publisher: Raj Comics
- First appearance: Aag Comics (1991)
- Created by: Sanjay Gupta

In-story information
- Alter ego: Inspector Vinay
- Abilities: Genius-level intellect; Costume provides several atomic-based powers like : Superhuman strength; Superhuman stamina; Superhuman agility; Size manipulation; Flight; Atomic rays; Shrink rays; Teleportation; Atomic absorption; Molecule manipulation

Parmanu is an Indian comic book superhero character published by Raj Comics. His super powers include splitting into atoms and flying to travel from one place to other and to reduce or increase his own size. Parmanu died in the Akhiri comic series, blasting himself in space to save earth.

== Fictional character background ==
Vinay saw a group of criminals kill his classmate when he was in high school. He vowed to avenge her death. He found the murder weapon, a revolver, and discovered that the killer was the head of police himself. To protect himself from the law, the head of police attempted to recover the revolver and tried to kill Vinay to accomplish this. Vinay was rescued by his maternal Uncle, Prof. K.K. Verma, and was brought to his lab. The monster Bufalo attacked them there and Prof. K.K. Verma revealed to Vinay that he had made a costume that could give him superpowers. Vinay put on the costume and became the Wonderman Parmanu. After a long struggle, Vinay succeeded in killing Bufalo. Thereafter, he avenged his classmate by killing the head of police.

Vinay's parents, along with most of his family, were killed during the hunt for the criminal. His brother, Vijay, and his uncle, Prof K.K. Verma, were the only surviving members of his family. The first comic of the series shows that Vijay helped the gangsters, and in this situation he had to kill his own brother.

== Allies ==
- Mamta Pathak (Pralayanka)
- Professor Kamal Kumar Verma
- Shipra
- Sheena
- Probot
- Inspector Dhanush
- Hawaldaar Baan

== Enemies ==
- Itihaas
- Diamond Killer
- General Kharonch
- Dr. No
- Dr. Madagascar
- Baluchi
- Madam Cold
- Ratan Daga
- Gunaakar
- Holika
- Vriksha
- Fandebaaz
- Hyena
- Typhoon
- BuddhiPalat
- Ghonga
- Angaar
- Cactus
- Neem Hakim
- ZeroG
- Nashketu
- Programmer
- Aakaa
- Principal

== Powers and abilities ==
Parmanu's costume gives him various superpowers. He can fly up to speed of sound with ease and can go beyond it. He can fire atomic bolts from his chest. His wrist gadgets can fire atomic bolts as well and reel out atomic rope. His belt contains many gadgets which help him to teleport, atomize, and reduce his size to any desired level. Initially, he used the button on his belt to do these actions, but later on Probot changed it into a voice recognition device, so that he could use his powers just by calling its name.

Parmanu receives back up from Probot, a robot who keeps an eye on Delhi with the help of his cameras, which he has fitted in numerous locations around the city. And he also gets help from Pralayanka (Mamta Pathak) who also is a creation of his maternal uncle like him.

== Titles ==
1. Parmanu
2. Aag
3. Bulletproof
4. Makhhi
5. Jonk
6. Khor
7. Bichhu
8. Lutere
9. Blade
10. Gangster
11. Barood
12. Alpin
13. Baaj
14. Lattoo
15. Drinda
16. Kekda
17. Rewalwer
18. Black Out
19. Underworld
20. Daddu
21. Hahakaar
22. Folad
23. Street Gang
24. Dynamite
25. Aapahij Gunde
26. Ek Aur Parmanu
27. Sawdhan
28. Taifoon
29. Madam Cold
30. Vriksha
31. Qahar
32. Black Spider
33. Angar
34. Gunaker
35. Ab Marega Parmanu
36. Budhipalat
37. Takker
38. Meri dress vapas kar

Raj Comics has produced several hundred titles on Parmanu. A list could be seen at

- Titles by Raj Comics

== Other appearances ==
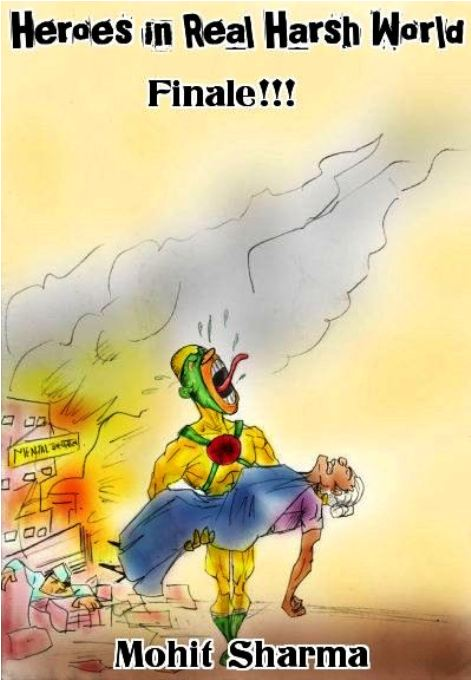
Book Series - Heroes in Real Harsh World (Mohit Trendster)

- Nanhe Samrat Magazine
- Heroes in Real Harsh World Book Series
- Parmanu (Trendy Baba Series, Book # 01)
- Indian Comics Fandom Magazine
- Vigyapans (Trendy Baba Series, Book #07)
- Fang Magazine (Raj Comics)
- World Comics & Graphic Novels News (WCGNN)
