= Bankelal =

Publication information
- Publisher: Raj Comics
- First appearance: 1987
- First comic appearance: Bankelal Ka Kamal
- Created by: Jitendra Bedi, Papindar Juneja

In-story information
- Species: Human
- Abilities: Luck

Bankelal is a fictional comic book character, that appears in comic books published by Raj Comics. He is a satirical character presented as a medieval "Hasya Samrat" (King of Comedy). The series is primarily humorous, though also incorporates elements of fantasy and horror. In 2016, BBC reported Bankelal among the four most widely sold comics in India. Raj Comics declared that Bankelal will be among the four comics characters whose animated movies will be released. In 2014, Navbharat Times listed Bankelal among the top 10 comics without which the summers of Indian children were incomplete.

== Origin ==
Bankelal was created by Late Shri Jitendra Bedi, and first appeared in 1987 in the comic book 'Bankelal Ka Kamaal' ('Wonders of Bankelal') which was written by Papindar Juneja who currently resides in Lucknow.

According to the book, he is the son of a farmer named 'Nanku'. His mother's name was 'Gulabati'. The couple did not have any children. Gulabati was a devotee of Lord 'Shiva' and a child was offered to them as a blessing from the Lord. They named the child Bankelal. He conspires to do evil against king Vikram Singh, but his conspiracies often end up helping Singh, to humorous effect. For a long time Bankelal was the one true comedic character in Raj Comics who had his own title series. Bankelal’s artwork was helmed by a legend of Indian comics Bedi ji (who was also responsible for Hawaldar Bahadur in Manoj Comics) and was cartoonish and colourful. Bedi ji added his own colloquial Punjabi phrases in a decidedly non Punjabi comic book, Bankelal and other characters would often say Hun Appa Da ki Hou, Hun Appa Da Kuchh nahi ho Sakda, most of the dialogues were appended with laughter ‘Hi Hi Hi’, and in tragi-comic situations the character would say ‘Bu Hu Hu Hi Hi Hi’, crying and laughing the whole time.

== Plot summary ==
Most of the stories of the series are of only one issue. Most issues start with Bankelal knowing a secret or something which he may use to kill king Vikram Singh and usurp the throne. Story develops further with the involvement of sages, yogis, Devi-Devtas and Rakshas, each of whom comes with incredible humorous twist to the story. In the end all the trickeries of Bankelal fail and Vikram Singh gets a lot of favor rather than harm.

Though there are some issues that are linked to each other like series in which Bankelal and Vikram Singh travel to different lokas (worlds) after beigh. This series includes issues such as Bankelal Tataiyalok Me, Kankaallok Me, Dev Lok Me, Sarplok Me, Vanarlok Me.

The dialogues, mantras read by Sages, and prayers were often peppered with anachronistic insertions of hindi film songs (which were usually topical for the time that the issue was released). The Sages and Gods’ names were hilarious (Rishi Kaatacharya, Rishi Leechracharya…) which often denoted what the Rishi was supposed to do. The monsters tried to be macabre but are felled by the simplest of things. For a comic which was targeted (but I guess not entirely so) to children there was a decent amount of murder and mayhem, but the drawings and the dialogues made sure that it never strayed far away from humour. As with the boons even curses had riders attached to them, so all angry Sages gave an escape route to the sufferer. Bankelal was populated with a motley of hilarious supporting characters, along with the rotund and good natured Raja Vikram Singh (who was a just king, but was quite gullible), Rani Swarnlata, their son Mohak, a cowardly and wily Senapati, and then there were ministers for everything. There was a Prabandh Mantri (Management Minister), a prathna mantri, and a Nara Mantri (Slogan Minister) whose job was to shout slogans. Bankelal also has a horse named Chetak, who is the only series regular to actually know what Bankelal is scheming about, he often foils Bankelal’s plans or at the very least leaves him flat on his face (All animals in the comic can speak to each other and have intelligible dialogues which humans do not understand, and all of them are on an equal pop-cultural reference footing as the humans) The appeal of Bankelal lay in the absurdity of the story lines, in the laugh-a-minute dialogue, and in the fact that the reader tended to root for Bankelal the mischief-maker, knowing fully well that he was going to lose in the end, but it was fun to hope for Bankelal to come close to winning just to see what long and elaborate explanation that he would come with. You see Bankelal has no superpowers at all except for a silver tongue and a cunning brain and a never give up attitude. A word of appreciation is required here for Tarun Kumar Wahi, who wrote comics on an industrious scale, helming multiple titles including Bankelal and coming up with the long and wrapped in themselves storylines of Bankelal month after month without repeating plots or relying on arch-enemies (Bankelal has none in terms of repeating characters) and making sure that he leaves his readers laughing is quite a tough task. Comedy is in fact a very tough genre to pull through. How much of the humour was Wahi ji’s and how much was due to improve/ad-lib (sic) while drawing the comics by Bedi ji, we would need the help of Raj Comics insiders to discern the same.

The dialogues and situations are all of the level of a Marx brother’s comedy, with every character (man/animal/demon/god/inanimate) participating a game of one-up-manship when it comes to quips. The situations are bizarre, sample this – The Nara Mantri (Slogan Minister) mistakenly shouts ‘Jai Mata Di’ in a normal Darbar day (he is half-asleep) and it leads to a wave of people shouting Jai Mata Di, which goes out of the palace and soon in a deliciously absurd segment covering two pages the entire kingdom is shouting Jai Mata Di and an impromptu Jagran is organized with Pundits, Pundals and Prasad. Half way through the Jagran the Slogan Minister wakes up and says sorry, that he said Jai Mata DI because he was attending a Jagran in his dream, but now that the Jagran is organized let’s get through with it anyway.

Such comedy is abundant in all Bankelal books, and you revel in it page after page never once questioning the logic behind it. Because logic negates the magic of these comics.

== Attributes ==
One day Lord Shiva visited Bankelal's home with his consort Parvati. His mother offered them a glass of milk unaware that her naughty child had put a frog in the milk ! When Lord Shiva discovered this he put a curse on Bankelal that if ever Bankelal tried to harm anybody, the person would be blessed with good results and some part of that would also be 'rubbed' on to Bankelal.

== Powers and abilities ==
Bankelal seems extremely stupid but he possesses a mind of devil, always planning mischief. But due to the"blessed" curse placed on him, every bad that he wants to do turns out to be good, turning the odds in his favour. Other than that, he has nothing, not even a good face, and only a silly Charlie Chaplin styled moustache and his two bucked teeth coming out when he screams or when he laughs. The good thing is that his every misdeed (mischief) acts as a funny tickle bone for the readers.

== Family, friends, and allies ==
Rani Swarnalata. Wife of maharaj Vikram Singh. Bankelal has a horse named Chetak which is another very funny character in comics series. Some notable guest appearances in Bankelal series includes Tilismdev and Bhokal.

== Enemies ==
Bankelal considers Raja Vikram Singh as his arch enemy. Bankelal always tries to kill him (never managed so far) and become the king of Vishalgarh. Mohak Singh, the prince of Vishalgarh is quite aware of his evil plans. Other courtiers are also jealous of Bankelal's popularity. These include Senapati Markhap, Prabandh Mantri and many others. Some nearby princely states of Vishalgarh also find it hard to kill Vikram Singh until Bankelal is with him.

== List of comic books ==
Issue No.	Comic Title	Artist	Author	Year
GENL-089	BANKELAL KA KAMAL	Bedi	Papinder Juneja	1987
GENL-090	KAR BURA HO BHALA	Bedi	Papinder Juneja	1987
GENL-128	RAJKOSH KE LUTERE	Bedi	Raja	
GENL-142	BANKELAL AUR YAKSHKUMAR	Bedi	Raja	
GENL-144	MUKADDAR KA DHANI	Bedi	Raja	
GENL-148	BANKELAL AUR SHADI KA SHADYANTRA	Bedi	Tarun Kumar Vahi	
GENL-158	SWARG KI MUSIBAT	Bedi	Tarun Kumar Vahi	
GENL-0162	PAARAS PATTHAR	Bedi	Tarun Kumar Vahi	
GENL-0187	LAASH KI TALAASH	Bedi	Tarun Kumar Vahi	
GENL-0191	KHATRE KA AWTAAR	Bedi	Tarun Kumar Vahi	
GENL-0195	BANKELAL AUR CHALIS CHOR	Bedi	Tarun Kumar Vahi	
GENL-0198	PARIYON KI MUSIBAT	Bedi	Papinder Juneja	
GENL-0203	JADUGAR DANGA	Bedi	Papinder Juneja	
GENL-0213	MURDA SHAITAN	Bedi	Tarun Kumar Vahi	
GENL-0218	SHADYANTRAKARI ATMA	Bedi	Papinder Juneja	
GENL-0221	MAUT KA TRISHUL	Bedi	Papinder Juneja	
GENL-0229	UNGALIMAAL	Bedi	Tarun Kumar Vahi	
GENL-0236	TAALAB KA CHOR	Bedi	Tarun Kumar Vahi	
GENL-0242	TILISMI JAAL	Bedi	Tarun Kumar Vahi	
GENL-0251	PATAAL RAKSHAS	Bedi	Tarun Kumar Vahi	
GENL-0257	RAKSHASON KI KHETI	Bedi	Tarun Kumar Vahi	
GENL-0277	BANKELAL AUR DHARTI JAKAD	Bedi	Tarun Kumar Vahi	
GENL-0286	DEVTA KI MANI	Bedi	Tarun Kumar Vahi	
GENL-0294	BANKELAL KANKAL LOK MEIN	Bedi	Tarun Kumar Vahi	
GENL-0307	BANKELAL DEVLOK MEIN	Bedi	Tarun Kumar Vahi	
879	Dumtara (दुमतारा)	Bedi	Tarun Kumar Vahi	1998
889	Tees Maar Khaan (तीस मार खां)	Bedi	Sachin Sachdeva	1998
903	Chonchu (चोंचू)	Bedi	Tarun Kumar Vahi	1998
1066	Dustyanti (दुष्ट्यन्ती)	Bedi	Tarun Kumar Vahi	1999
