= List of Dhruva supporting characters =

Dhruva's allies clockwise from top left- Samri, Dhananjay, Kirigi and Jingaloo

Super Commando Dhruva titles have featured a long list of secondary supporting characters over the years. Super Commando Dhruva is an Indian comic book superhero character appearing in comic books published by Raj Comics. The character, created by writer and illustrator Anupam Sinha, first appeared in GENL #74 Pratishodh Ki Jwala

The list of secondary supporting characters that includes friends, foes, family, love interests and at times other Raj comics superheroes in crossovers. The first major recurring supporting character introduced in the Dhruva series was his foster father, I. G. Rajan Mehra, in Dhruva's debut title. A couple of issues later, Chandika—arguably the most important and popular side character not only in the Dhruva series but in the entire Raj Comics universe—was introduced. At times, Dhruva has appeared alongside other Raj Comics superheroes in multi-hero crossovers.Dhruva also has a well known rogues gallery full of an assortment of supervillains including Grand Master Robo, Chandakaal, and Mahamanav.

== Family ==
This section enlists characters who are either related to Dhruva (blood relatives/foster relatives) or are very close to him.

=== Immediate family ===
Following is the list of Dhruva's blood relatives.

- Shyam: Shyama was Dhruva's father. He worked as a trapeze artist in Jupiter circus. He was killed in front of Dhruva's eyes at the hands of rival Globe circus's strongman Jubisko. First appearance - GENL #74 'Pratishodh Ki Jwala' (1988)
- Radha: Radha was Shyam's wife and Dhruva's mother. She too worked as a trapeze artist in the Jupiter circus where she met Shyam for the first time. She was killed on the same fateful day of her husband's death in the Jupiter circus carnage. First appearance - GENL #74 'Pratishodh Ki Jwala' (1988)

=== Foster family ===
After the Jupiter circus carnage, when a 14yrs old Dhruva had nowhere to go, Rajangar's SP Rajan Mehra adopted him as his son. Dhruva grew really fond and protective of his foster family to the extent that when he found out that he had an extended family living in France and his grand father requested him to stay back in France and take care of the family's vast estate business, he rejected the idea citing that he can't leave his family in Rajnagar alone. His foster family consists of-

- IG Rajan Mehra: SP Rajan Mehra is a top ranked police office in Rajnagar police department. Initially an SP at the time of adopting Dhruva, he was later promoted to the post of IG. IG Rajan has been a constant ray of inspiration in Dhruva's vigil against criminals. First appearance - GENL #74 'Pratishodh Ki Jwala' (1988)
- Mrs. Rajni Mehra: She is IG Rajan's wife and a simple housewife. First appearance - GENL #74 'Pratishodh Ki Jwala' (1988)
- Shweta Mehra: Shweta is Dhruva's little foster sister, the only biological child of the Mehra's. She is a budding scientist and also functions as a masked heroine, Chandika, a secret even Dhruva doesn't know. First appearance - GENL #74 'Pratishodh Ki Jwala' (1988)

=== Love interests ===
- Natasha: Natasha is Dhruva's primary love interest and the daughter of his enemy Grand Master Robo. Always torn up between her love for her superhero boyfriend and her criminal father, she keeps oscillating between the two worlds, the crime world of Robo and Dhruva's lawful world. In Nagayana, a futuristic parallel series set in alternate universe, Natasha has been shown to be Dhruva's lawfully wedded wife. First appearance - SPCL #2 'Grand Master Robo' (1991)
- Richa: Known as Black cat. She has a team of trained cats.

=== Dhruva's lineage ===
- Jalaj Son of Natasha
- Rishi Son of Richa
- Dhruvishya
- Vitler: Vitler is Dhruva's descendant from a very distant future. Dhruva met Vitler when he time travelled to 25,496 AD. Unlike Dhruva and his other descendants, who were the protectors of humanity, Vitler was a tyrant dictator of his times who ruled half the world. After Dhruva's visit, Vitler has a change of heart resulting in bringing peace and harmony to the world. First appearance - GENL #230 'Udantashtari Ke Bandhak' (1991)

== Friends and allies ==
Dhruva has a huge assortment of allies, ranging from normal humans and masked vigilantes to ferals and superpowered beings. Apart from his own supporting characters, Dhruva has also interacted with other superheroes of the Raj Comics universe and often fought as a team with them against larger threats. The following is a list of various allies of Dhruva:

=== Major allies ===
- Chandika (Shweta): Alter ego of Shweta. Chandika is the most important ally and most recurring character of the Dhruva series. She is a blonde superheroine who wears purple-colored tights, blue boots, and a blue domino mask. The only person who knows this secret is Natasha. Natasha herself has donned the identity of Chandika a couple of times to rescue Shweta from being identified. Chandika, like her brother, depends more on brains than brawn and to a large extent on her self-invented gadgets. In Nagayana, when Shweta was presumably dead — although later revived — Natasha kept Chandika alive by donning her costume. First appearance: GENL #96 “Swarg Ki Tabahi” (1989).
- Dhananjay: A warrior of Swarna-Nagri, a golden city hidden beneath the ocean, located on the ocean bed near the Indian coast. It is the home of Swarna-Manavas, descendants of gods. He carries a golden lasso and has the ability to create interdimensional transit windows. He also provided Dhruva with the ability to breathe underwater. First appearance: SPCL #2 “Grand Master Robo” (1991).
- Jingaloo: Jingaloo is the prince of yetis residing in the Himalayas and a very close friend of Dhruva. He is claimed to be a descendant of Lord Hanuman. First appearance: GENL #140 “Barf Ki Chita” (1990).
- Vanputra: Vanputra is a forest dweller, a tribal who lives in National Forest on the outskirts of Rajnagar. He is a plant manipulator, with the ability to communicate with plants. On his command, plants can grow in seconds, move, and even kill someone. First appearance: GENL #255 “Vinash Ke Vriksha” (1991).

== Team associations ==
=== Jupiter Circus ===
Jupiter circus was where Dhruva was born and brought up in his childhood. Apart from Dhruva himself and his parents Shyam and Radha, following were the significant members of Jupiter circus:

- Jacob: Jacob was the owner of Jupiter circus and loved Dhruva very much. He declared Dhruva a beneficiary in Jupiter circus insurance. The money he inherited from the insurance helped Dhruva to set up his own Commando Force after the Jupiter Circus carnage.
- Pawan: A motorcycle stunt expert.
- Hercules: Strongman of Jupiter circus.
- Sulaiman: A sharp shooter.
- Ranjan: Knife throwing expert.
- Sherkhan: Ring-Master of Jupiter circus.
- Anna: Used to run dolphin shows in Jupiter circus.

All the Jupiter Circus members made their first appearance in Dhruva's debut title GENL #74 “Pratishodh Ki Jwala” (1988), except Anna, who first appeared in SPCL #2 “Grand Master Robo” (1991) in a flashback. All the characters of Jupiter Circus were believed to have died in the circus carnage. Much later, Jacob was revealed to be the sole survivor when his character returned in SPCL #100 “Khooni Khandan” (1997) to help Dhruva uncover the truth about his father's past.

=== Commando Force ===
Commando Force is a specially trained unit formed by Dhruva to aid him in his crime fighting sojourn. He used 50 lakh rupees that he received from Jupiter Circus insurance claim to establish it, while his foster father IG Rajan Mehra ensured he got all the necessary government approvals to establish the same. Initially, just 3 cadets strong with Rajnagar being their operative ground, commando force has expanded its presence throughout the country. Dhruva himself is the captain of the Commando Force. Apart from Dhruva, there are 3 prominent and named members in this team:

- Peter Macey
- Renu
- Karim Shah

All three of them made their first appearance in GENL #79 'Roman Hatyara' (1988). While Peter and Renu do most of the field work, Karim is primarily a communications expert. Apart from these 3 named cadets, commando force has added many unnamed cadets to its ranks since its inception.

== Villains ==
Dhruva's rogues gallery is one of the most identifiable one in Indian comics genre. Grand Master Robo, Chandakaal and Mahamanav are some of the most well known and recognisable villains in Indian comics. Dhruva's enemies include normal criminals like Jubisko, Champion Killer; tricksters like Bauna Waman, Vidooshak; mad scientists like Dhwaniraj, Dr. Virus; demons like Chandakaal and even aliens, but Dhruva's most implacable foe is Grand Master Robo. Some of Dhruva's enemies possess a bit more ambiguous personalities and are known to sometimes fight against him while supporting him on other occasions. Classic examples include Nostredamas, Commander Natasha, Black Cat and Nakshatra.
