= Fauladi Singh =

Science fiction comic character in India

Fauladi Singh is science fiction comic character in India in the decades of seventies and eighties, known as the protector of mankind. The comic was ahead of its times, at least, considering the cartoon/comic scene in India in the early eighties.

== Plot summary ==
On a small island in the Indian Ocean was located the laboratory of Dr John, an exceptional scientist, who empowered Shekhar as Fauladi Singh alias Faulad with supernatural powers and gave him a costume that protected him on Earth and in Outer Space.

His friend, Lambu, who had turned miniature (barely nine inches) after drinking a potion made by Dr John, assists him in his space operations. Dr John, Faulad and Lambu along with Dorf rocket (that works on its own), master computers Bharat and Antarikshak, safeguard earth from aliens and attacks from other galaxies and neighbouring hostile planets.

Queen Rabunia of planet Techna is a major ally.

Fauladi Singh's love interest is Goddess Shafeena who he meets in Vinash Ke Pujari and Dhuen Ki Aurat.

== Origin ==
The Fauladi Singh series was initially written by Rajiv in Diamond Comics and illustrated by Baldev Singh Sandhu. Anupam Sinha of Detective Kapil and Super Commando Dhruva took over from him. Later Ashu wrote it and the illustrations were made by Jugal Kishor.

== Fauladi Singh Comics List ==
Reprints Available.

DC#	Name (Hindi)	Name (English)	Cover Artist	Artist	Writer	Female Lead	Main Villain	Notes
4	Lauh Manav	-	Baldev Singh Sandhu	Baldev Singh Sandhu	Rajiv		Doctor Gustav	Introduces Lambu
8	Vichitra Anda	-	Baldev Singh Sandhu	Baldev Singh Sandhu	Rajiv	Misha	Dollar	Part - I
12	Dollar Ka Ant	-	Baldev Singh Sandhu	Baldev Singh Sandhu	Rajiv	Misha	Dollar	Part - II
16	Antriksh Ke Daku	-	Baldev Singh Sandhu	Baldev Singh Sandhu	Rajiv		Alien Commander	Part - I
20	Udan Tashtari Ka Rahasya	-	Baldev Singh Sandhu	Baldev Singh Sandhu	Rajiv		Alien Commander	Part - II
22	Antriksh Yanon Ke Chor	The Thieves of Space Craft	Baldev Singh Sandhu	Baldev Singh Sandhu	Rajiv		Luna/Cargo Emperors	
26	Samudra Nagar	City Under the Ocean	Baldev Singh Sandhu	Baldev Singh Sandhu	Rajiv	Misha, Princess	Makola	
32	Khatarnak Shadyantra	Secret Conspiracy		Anupam Sinha	Rajiv		Boss, Sumo Captain	
40	Parmanu Bomb Ke Chor	Nuclear Conspiracy	Baldev Singh Sandhu	Anupam Sinha	Rajiv			Part - I + Private Detective Raman aur Heere Ke Chor (By Anupam Sinha)
42	Shikanja	Stranglehold	Baldev Singh Sandhu	Anupam Sinha	Rajiv			Part - II
47	Prithvi Ke Chor	Ambush with Planetary Robbers	Baldev Singh Sandhu	Baldev Singh Sandhu	Rajiv	Misha	Gunther of Toro	
51	Shaitan Tarwill	Culprit Tarwill		Anupam Sinha			Tarwill, Karato	Part - I
58	Tarwill Se Takkar	Devil Incarnate Tarwill		Anupam Sinha			Tarwill, Karato	Part - II
64	Carcola Ka Chakravyuh	Carcola Conspiracy		Jugal Kishore				Introduces Bharat
71	Ajnabi Grah Main	Strange Planet	Baldev Singh Sandhu	Baldev Singh Sandhu			Alien Emperor Garana	
77	Antriksh Main Tabahi	Devastation in Space		Jugal Kishore		Ira	Dok, Emperor Dakota	Reprinted as D-611
83	Globe Ka Aatank	Rebellion of Globe		Jugal Kishore	Ashwani (Ashu)	Maurvi		Part - I, Introduces Antrikshak
86	Dreamland Ka Badshah	Dreamland Supremo		Jugal Kishore	Ashwani (Ashu)	Maurvi		Part - II
91	Antriksh Main Sangram	The Space War		Jugal Kishore	Ashwani (Ashu)	Maurvi		Part - III
101	Vinash Ke Pujari	The Incendiaries The Destroyers		Anupam Sinha		Shafeena	Shafeena, Agufa	
113	Antriksh Ka Bhagwan	Space Titan		Jugal Kishore	Ashwani (Ashu)		Karato, Agufa, Lambu	Part - I
122	Sitaron Ka Yudh	Stars War		Jugal Kishore	Ashwani (Ashu)		Lambu	Part - II
139	Darkland Ka Shaitan			Jugal Kishore	Ashwani (Ashu)			
161	Chipkali Ka Pratishodh			Jugal Kishore	Ashwani (Ashu)			
173	Chakravyuh Ka Maseeha	The Supreme Strategist		Jugal Kishore	Ashwani (Ashu)		Tundla, Kekda	Part - I
188	Dictator Ki Tabaahi			Jugal Kishore	Ashwani (Ashu)	Shano	Sankal	
203	Akhiri Sangram	The Last Battle		Jugal Kishore	Ashwani (Ashu)		Fake Rabunia, Tumbako, Heles (Dr John's Wife's Killer)	Part - I
217	Antriksh Ki Pretatma	Space Ghost		Jugal Kishore	Ashwani (Ashu)		Altross (Dr John's Wife)	Part - II
236	Dhuen Ki Aurat	Smoke Woman/Smoke Lady		Jugal Kishore	Ashwani (Ashu)	Shafeena	Queen Alfa, Minister Laos	
256	Maut Ki Dharti	Land Of Death		Jugal Kishore	Ashwani (Ashu)	Dhuri	Dhuri, Bhumi	
270	Antriksh Ki Apsara	The Space Nymph/Fairy Of Space		Jugal Kishore	Ashwani (Ashu)	Shafeena	Tharsa	Part - I
274	Swarg Ke Bhagwan	Heaven's God/God Of Heaven		Jugal Kishore	Ashwani (Ashu)			Part - II
Digest 1	Antriksh Ka Rakshas			Jugal Kishore	Ashwani (Ashu)		Pushpbala, Hikoopa, Kekda	Chakravyuh Ka Maseeha Part - II
293	Jehreela Shadyantra			Jugal Kishore	Ashwani (Ashu)		Dr Seeraj	
309	Pagal Robot	Crazy Robot		Jugal Kishore	Ashwani (Ashu)			Part - I
321	Sitaron Ka Dushman	Enemy Of Stars		Jugal Kishore	Ashwani (Ashu)			Part - II
330	Operation Murderland; Vishalkaya Chooha			Jugal Kishore; Jugal Kishore	Ashwani (Ashu); Ashwani (Ashu)		Emperor Mandrako; Girija Shankar	
337	Paras Ke Chor; Diamond Ka Grah; Mahapishach Ka Hamla			Jugal Kishore; Jugal Kishore; Jugal Kishore	Rama Prabhakar; Rama Prabhakar; Ashwani (Ashu)	- - Sapna	Ojo; Poltan; Hairat, Mahapishach	- - (Hairat - Part 10), (Sapna - Part 7)
347	Mayavi Sundari; Ek Anokha Kartavya; Blackland Ka Shadiyantra			Jugal Kishore; Bharat Makwana; Bharat Makwana	Ashwani (Ashu); Ashwani (Ashu); Ashwani (Ashu)	Sapna; Poonam(Bharat) -	Hairat; Aughad Nath; Planet Magnon's Devil	(Hairat - Part 9), (Sapna - Part 6) - Introduces Bharat (Pishach)
363	Prithvi Par Hangama			Bharat Makwana	Ashwani (Ashu)		Joker, Romo Samrat	
376	Paropkari Pishach; Pishach Ka Intqaam; Paras; Antriksh Ki Aag			Bharat Makwana; Bharat Makwana; Jugal Kishore; Jugal Kishore	Ashwani (Ashu); Ashwani (Ashu); Rama Prabhakar; Ashwani (Ashu)		Planet Magnon's Devil; Zoro; Planet Goga Chief; Hairat	Bharat (Pishach) - - (Hairat - Part 11), (Sapna - Part 8)
384	Gupt Ghati			Jugal Kishore	Ashwani (Ashu)		Jordis	
392	Indrajaal; Shaitanon Ka Hamla			Bharat Makwana; Bharat Makwana	Ashwani (Ashu); Ashwani (Ashu)	Indrajaal Ki Rani -	Hairat; Blackland Emperor Joshen	(Hairat - Part 1) Introduces Jadugar Hairat and Indrajaal Ki Rani -
404	Shaitanon Ki Toli; Indrajaal Ki Rani			Bharat Makwana; Bharat Makwana	Ashwani (Ashu); Ashwani (Ashu)	- Indrajaal Ki Rani	Emperor Shaitan; Hairat	- (Hairat - Part 2)
416	Antriksh Ke Samrat	The Emperor Of Space		Jugal Kishore	Ashwani (Ashu)		Subahu	
427	Antriksh Ke Daku (Blackland Ke Shaitan); Pari Lok Ki Rani			Jugal Kishore; Bharat Makwana; Bharat Makwana	Ashwani (Ashu); Ashwani (Ashu); Ashwani (Ashu)	- - Indrajaal Ki Rani, Pari Lok Ki Rani (Shabni)		Shaitanon Ka Hamla Part - II (Hairat - Part 3)
441	Antriksh Ka Mahatma			Bharat Makwana	Ashwani (Ashu)		Mahatma, Emperor Neuma	
452	Pagal Samrat			Bharat Makwana	Ashwani (Ashu)		Computer Emperor Geshoon	
461	Mahavinash			Bharat Makwana	Ashwani (Ashu)	Sapna		(Hairat - Part 7), (Sapna - Part 4)
473	Shaitanon Ka Mandir; Prithvi Ki Apsara			Bharat Makwana; Bharat Makwana	Ashwani (Ashu); Ashwani (Ashu)	- Sapna	General; Sundar	- (Hairat - Part 6), (Sapna - Part 3)
489	Lambu Ka Apharan; Computer Ka Apharan			Bharat Makwana; Bharat Makwana	Ashwani (Ashu); Ashwani (Ashu)		Robo General; Yukoma Robot Mukhiya	
498	Khaufnak Sapola			Bharat Makwana	S. C. Bedi			
508	Patal Lok Ki Rani			Bharat Makwana	Ashwani (Ashu)	Sapna	Hairat	Introduces Sapna (Sapna - Part 1) (Hairat - Part 4)
520	Prithvi Ke Dushman			Bharat Makwana	Zameer			
529	Doctor Devil			Jugal Kishore	Ashwani (Ashu)		Marcos Davis (Dr. Devil)	
554	Maut Ka Darwaza			Bharat Makwana	Ashwani (Ashu)		Joker	
569	Rahasyamaya Dhamake			Vinod Bhatia	Jaswant Singh			
581	Neeli Aandhi			Jugal Kishore	G. P. Sharma			
594	Tabaahi Ke Doot			Bharat Makwana	G. P. Sharma			
611	Antriksh Main Tabahi			Jugal Kishore				Reprint of D-77
616	Carcola Ka Chakravyuh			Jugal Kishore				Reprint of D-64
619	Shunya Ka Ghera			Jugal Kishore			Tasunia	
636	Gaddar Robot			Yogesh	Zameer			
641	Paras Ke Chor			Jugal Kishore	Rama Prabhakar	-	Ojo	Reprint of D-337
647	Antriksh Ka Nagar			Jugal Kishore	Ashwani (Ashu)			
658	Antriksh Main Visphot			Yogesh	Ashwani (Ashu)		Emperor Mogna	
672	Samudra Main Hangama			Yogesh	G. P. Sharma			
686	Black Hole			Jugal Kishore	Neerad			
699	Dr John Ka Atank			Jugal Kishore	Zameer			
707	Hadku			Raj Kumar Sharma	G. P. Sharma			
722	Shaitan Adnan			Yogesh	G. P. Sharma			
734	Acitoma Ka Vichitra Manav						Emperor Gargunja, Acitoma	
746	Lavasur				M. D. Sharma			
755	Time Man			Yogesh	M. D. Sharma			
768	Jhandakshak			Sohan Bhargav	M. D. Sharma			
778	Mahayatra			Jugal Kishore	Zameer			
789	Blunia			Sohan Bhargav	M. D. Sharma			
806	Khatarnak Dulhan			Jugal Kishore	Zameer			
827	Dushman Ke Jaal Main			Yogesh	G. P. Sharma			
833	Mahachalbaaz			Arun Kumar Chaubey	V. K. Jain			
849	Lakadbaggha			Sohan Bhargav	M. D. Sharma			
871	Atank Doot			Yogesh	M. D. Sharma			
886	Parchhaeen Ka Hangama			Yogesh	Ashwani (Ashu)			
890	Ghotaar			Arun Kumar Chaubey	M. D. Sharma			
908	Operation Jibraan			Jugal Kishore	M. D. Sharma			
920	Folding Man			Jugal Kishore	M. D. Sharma			
941	Madam Stainless			Jugal Kishore	M. D. Sharma			
952	Cactus Queen			Jugal Kishore	M. D. Sharma			
979	Grand Master			Jugal Kishore	M. D. Sharma			
991	Machini Amitabh			Jugal Kishore	M. D. Sharma			
1009	Robo Hunter			Jugal Kishore	M. D. Sharma			
1024	Oorja Ke Lutere			Yogesh	M. D. Sharma			
1042	Bramhand Bhakshi	Universe Eaters		Khalil Khan	M. D. Sharma			
1057	Antriksh Ke Shaitan	Devils Of Space		Yogesh				
1071	Anokha Shadiyantra			Khalil Khan	M. D. Sharma			
1086	Soorma Critons			Khalil Khan	M. D. Sharma, Rajeev Kumar			
1096	Black Crow			Khalil Khan	Zameer			
1111	Time Bomb			Khalil Khan	M. D. Sharma			
1123	Mangola			Aadil Khan, Rashid Khan	M. D. Sharma			
1138	Sugraal			Khalil Khan	M. D. Sharma			
1157	Daanvasur			Khalil Khan	M. D. Sharma			
1170	Hajmola			Khalil Khan	M. D. Sharma			
1187	Magic Stone			Khalil Khan	M. D. Sharma			
1218	Hillyaan			Khalil Khan	M. D. Sharma			
1270	Sapola			Khalil Khan	M. D. Sharma			
1289	Lobo Grah Ki Yatra			Vinod Bhatia	V. K. Vats			
1337	Fighter Robot			Chandu	V. K. Vats			
1363	Antriksh Ki Shahzadi	Princess Of Space		Chandu	Ashwani (Ashu)			
1386	Antriksh Ke Lutere	Space Pirates		Chandu	Ashwani (Ashu)			
1416	Taandav; Dr John	Violent Dance; Dr John		Saah	M. D. Sharma			Reprinted as Dr John with image from second story.
1452	Black Hole Ka Daitya	Monster Of The Black Hole		Vinod Bhatia	Ashwani (Ashu)			

=== Fauladi Singh Digest List ===
Digest#	Name (Hindi)	Name (English)	Artist	Writer	Female Lead	Main Villain	Notes
Digest 1	Antriksh Ka Rakshas; Antriksh Main Hangama		Jugal Kishore	Ashwani (Ashu)			Antriksh Main Hangama same as DC-51 Shaitan Tarwill/DC-58 Tarwill Se Takkar
Digest 2	Joker ka Gulam		Bharat Makwana	Ashwani (Ashu)		Joker	Ankur Collection
Digest 3	Romo Grah Ka Challenge		Bharat Makwana	Ashwani (Ashu)		Joker	Ankur Collection
Digest 4	Joker Ka Intqaam; Black Box; Vinash Ke Pujari		Bharat Makwana; Bharat Makwana	Ashwani (Ashu); Rama Prabhakar		Joker, Emperor Mangodra; Atai Supreme Commander	DC-101 Vinash Ke Pujari
Digest 5	Blackland Ki Shahazadi; Darkland Ka Shaitan		Bharat Makwana	Ashwani (Ashu)	Princess Shami	Prince Haroon, Emperor Joshen	DC-139 Darkland Ka Shaitan
Digest 6	Bretas Grah Ki Rajkumari; Maharani Ka Apharan		Bharat Makwana; Bharat Makwana	Zameer; Ashwani (Ashu)	Lorita -	Lorita; Hiroshima Ka Danav	Mini Comic Maharani Ka Apharan
Digest 7	Khoon Ki Pyasi; Antriksh Ka Samrat		Jugal Kishore	Zameer			DC-416 Antriksh Ke Samrat

=== Fauladi Singh Mini Comic List ===
M#	Name (Hindi)	Name (English)	Artist	Writer	Female Lead	Main Villain	Notes
4	Dr. John (Ka Apharan)		Jugal Kishore	Rama Prabhakar			
14	Prithvi Ke Vijeta		Bharat Makwana	Ashwani (Ashu)	Sapna	Nagnath	(Hairat - Part 12), (Sapna - Part 9)
23	Rahasyamayi Rajkumari; Parajit Devta		Bharat Makwana	Ashwani (Ashu)	Sapna; Sapna	Ranbahadur Singh; Rahul Dev, Nakul Sen, Hairat	(Hairat - Part 5), (Sapna - Part 2) (Hairat - Part 8), (Sapna - Part 5)
53	Shaitan Torkil						
	Murda Grah		Sohan Bhargav	M. D. Sharma			
	Nakli Nishan/Nakli Insan		Vinod Bhatia	M. D. Sharma			
	Hatyara Khabru		Rajesh Bhatia	Rajesh Bhatia			
	Double Bomb		Vinod Bhatia	M. D. Sharma			
	Andhe Yoddha						
	Maharani ka Apharan		Bharat Makwana	Ashwani (Ashu)			Also published in Digest 6
	Anokha Shadiyantra		Khalil Khan	M. D. Sharma			
