= S. Chand Group =

Indian academic publishing company founded in 1939

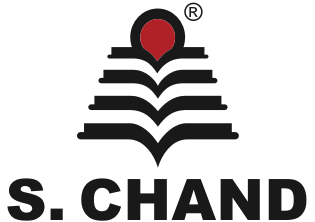
- Company type: Public
- Traded as: NSE : SCHAND; BSE : 540497
- Industry: Publishing and education services
- Founded: 1939
- Founder: Shyam Lal Gupta
- Headquarters: New Delhi, India
- Key people: Himanshu Gupta (managing director); Dinesh Kumar Jhunjhnuwala (executive director)
- Website: www.schandgroup.com

S. Chand Group is an Indian publishing and education services companies, founded in 1939 and based in New Delhi. The publishing house prints books for primary, secondary and higher education sectors.

It was the first company in India to get the ISO 9001:2000 certification. Books of this publishing house are distributed across India and South Asia, Southeast Asia, the Middle East and Africa.

The company operates from approximately 25 offices and a similar number of branches, and employs a workforce of over 2000 employees.

In 2013, Forbes India named S. Chand Group as the fastest growing player in the education sector, and the group claims to sell over 10,000 titles to over 40,000 schools and educational institutes.

== History ==
S. Chand was founded in 1939, in a by-lane of Chandni Chowk by Shyam Lal Gupta, as a part of a nationalistic effort to provide a voice to Indian authors and educate India's population.

Publishing in India was at the time dominated by the British, and most books and magazines were imported from England. Shyam Lal Gupta entered the market by publishing two books at a lower cost than the prevailing rates. The first textbook to be published by S. Chand was a "Textbook of Physical Chemistry" by Prof. Bahl & Tuli. The revised edition of the book is still in the market.

In 1960, S. Chand established its own printing press.

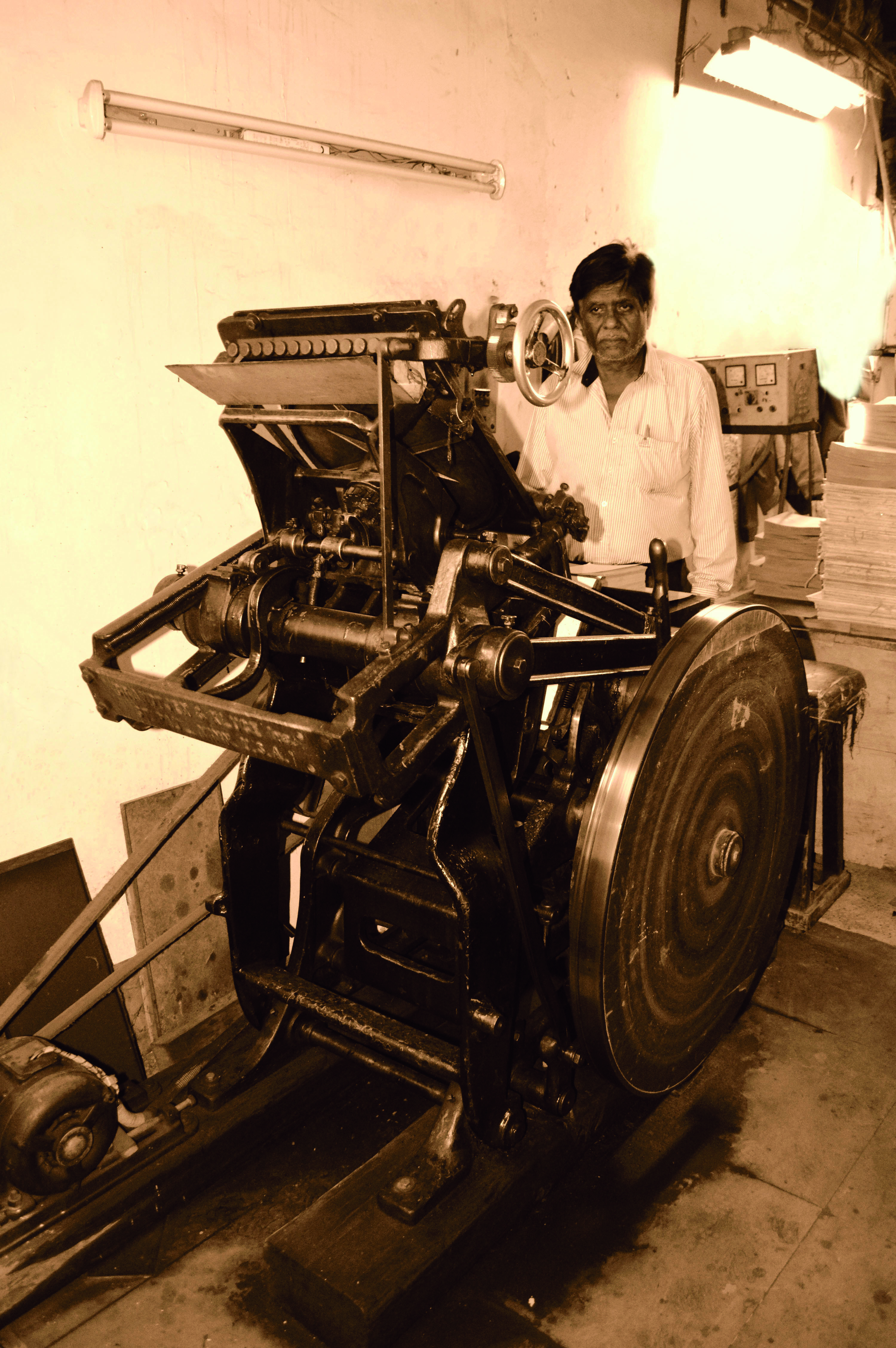
Monotype Composing Machine used in 1961

The company continued investing in technology, moving from composition and offset printing to computer plate printing.

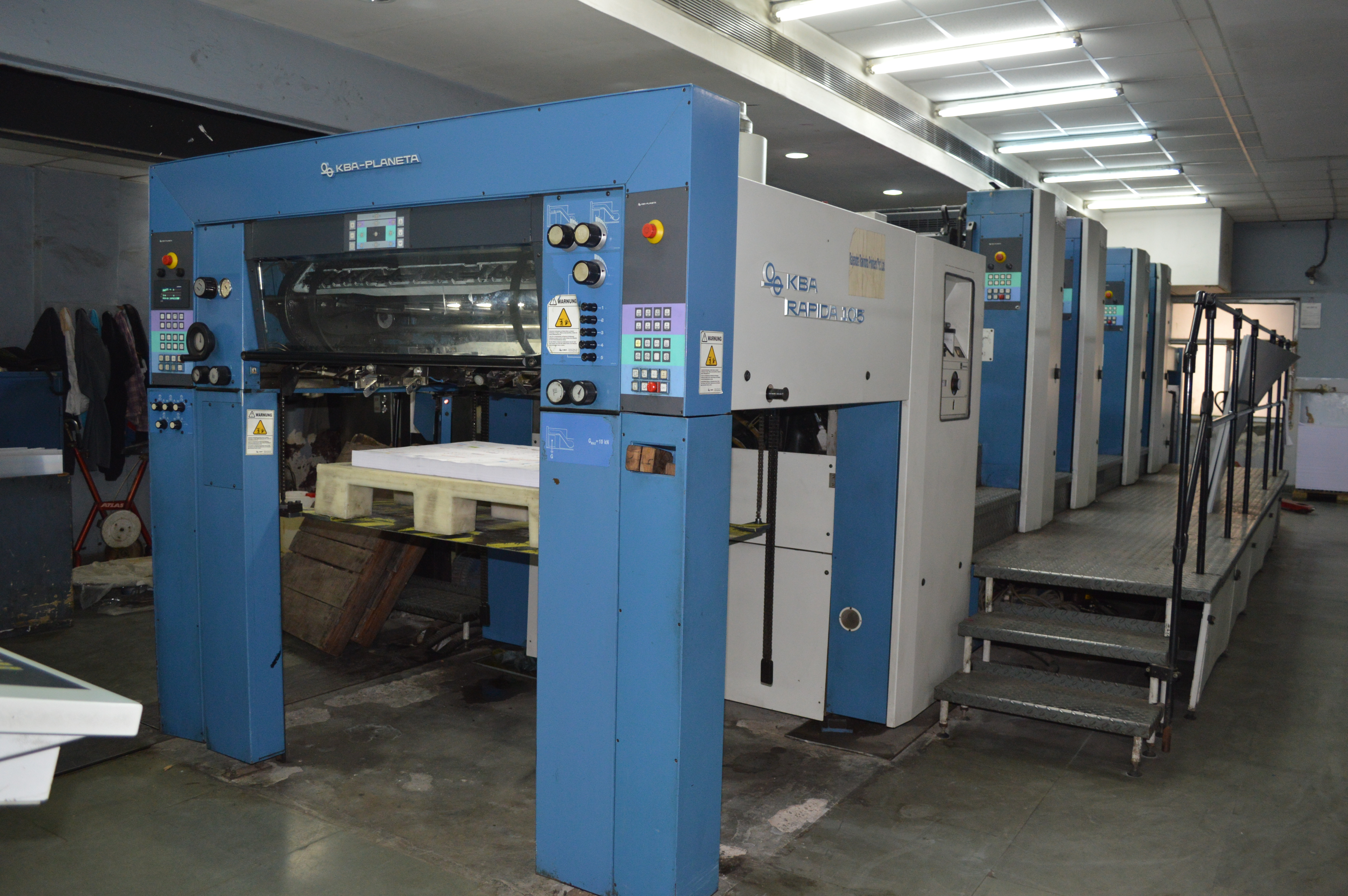
Planenta Super Variant Machines

By this time, Shyam Lal Gupta had gathered fame as one of the pioneers of the Indian Publishing Industry. He was awarded the "Padma Shri" by the Indian Government in 1969 and was elected to the Rajya Sabha from Bihar in 1972. He was also one of the founding members of the Federation of Indian Publishers, and its first president.

In 1976 S. Chand entered the school textbook market, a segment that it has since come to dominate. Shyam Lal Gupta was initially reluctant because of the sector's long-credit policies, but was persuaded otherwise efforts by his son Ravindra Kumar Gupta. In the 1980s, the company also published comic books like Chitra Bharti Kathamala, a series that enjoyed moderate success and was fairly popular before being discontinued in the latter part of the decade. Artists such as Anupam Sinha created popular characters and series such as Detective Kapil, Manas Putra and Space Star before moving on to Raj Comics with Super Commando Dhruva. In 2006, S. Chand became the first publisher in India to be certified for ISO 9001:2000.

The S. Chand group acquired Vikas Publishing House Private Limited (including Madhubun books) in 2012 for a total consideration of ₹144 crore (₹1.4 billion, or US$26 million), New Saraswati House (India) Private Limited over two tranches in 2014-16 for a total consideration of ₹149 crore (₹1.49 billion, or US$24 million), and Chhaya Prakashani Private Limited over two tranches in 2016-19 for ₹235 crore (₹2.35 billion, or US$35 million).

S. Chand and Company had its initial public offering (IPO) on 26 April 2017.

As of August 2022, S. Chand and Company Limited continued to show robust growth, with EBITDA up by 158%.

== Education services and digital content ==
In recent years, the group has diversified its offering after stating its aim to be a "knowledge corporation." The various digital initiatives that the company has launched are:

- Learnflix – The company launched "Learnflix," India's most affordable personalized learning app, in January 2020 anchored around the school curriculum for Grades 6 to 10.
- Mylestone – Curriculum solution for schools focused on Tier 2 and Tier 3 cities in India. Also offered online.
- Mystudygear – Provides blended learning with a variety of schoolbooks.
- Destination Success – Enabling digital classrooms (CBSE/ICSE/IB and State Board Schools).
- Smart K – Early Learning Curriculum solutions (preschools).
- Chhaya Learning App – Bengali/English learning with books.
- VRX – Virtual Reality with books.

== Corporate social responsibility ==
Shyam Lal Charitable Trust was established by the Shri Shyam Lal Gupta, into which the royalties of the company's 6 bestselling books was divested for furthering the cause of education and medicine. The fund established the Shyam Lal College under the University of Delhi in 1964.

== Notable publications ==
S. Chand uses authors who are well known in their subject areas, including O.P. Malhotra. Since its inception, it has worked with more than 2,400 authors and has delivered more than 15,000 titles for students in schools, colleges, universities and other higher education institutes across India and other countries. Some of the notable titles from the company are:

- Principles of Physics (V. K. Mehta)
- Advanced Inorganic Chemistry (R. D. Madan)
- Mathematics Today for ICSE (O. P. Malhotra, S. K. Gupta, Anubhuti Gangal)
- Language of Chemistry or Chemical Equations (G. D. Tuli, P. L. Soni)
- Wren and Martin High School English Grammar & Composition
- Verbal & Non-Verbal Reasoning (R. S. Aggarwal)
- Nuclear Physics
- Organisational Behaviour
- Electrical Technology (BL Theraja)
