= List of Dhruva comics =

List of Raj Comics titles with Super Commando Dhruva

Dhruva making his debut in Raj Comics

Super Commando Dhruva is an Indian comic book superhero created by Indian comic book artist and writer Anupam Sinha. Dhruva first featured in the title Pratishodh Ki Jwala in 1987. Since then, the character has featured in many titles published by Raj Comics, including solo issues, two hero and multi-hero crossovers, parallel series set in alternate universes, limited series and guest appearances. This list presents all these titles in order of publication; it also includes titles in which Dhruva does not appear but which are related to the character.

== List of Dhruva titles ==
This table lists all Raj comics titles featuring Dhruva in chronological order. The primary publishing language for all Dhruva titles is Hindi however, many of these titles have since been translated and published in English as well.

Comic has been published in English
Comic has not been published in English

| Serial No. | Year | Issue No. | Original Hindi Title | English transliteration of comic title | Comic Title in English (Note: Original English title has been mentioned for issues that have also been published in English. The title of the issue published in English might not necessarily be a literal translation of its Hindi counterpart however, in case of issues that have not yet been published in English, their original Hindi title has been literally translated in English) | Solo/Two-hero/Multi-hero/other | Artist | Author | Note |
|---|---|---|---|---|---|---|---|---|---|
| 1 | 1987–1991 | GENL #74 | प्रतिशोध की ज्वाला | Pratishodh Ki Jwala | The Vengeance | Solo | Anupam Sinha | Anupam Sinha | Debut issue of Super Commando Dhruva |
| 2 | 1987–1991 | GENL #79 | रोमन हत्यारा | Roman Hatyara | The Roman Assassin | Solo | Anupam Sinha | Anupam Sinha | Dhruva's only solo issue where he is not featured on the cover art |
| 3 | 1987–1991 | GENL #92 | आदमखोरों का स्वर्ग | Aadamkhoron Ka Swarg | The Rise of Mutants | Solo | Anupam Sinha | Anupam Sinha | First part of a two-part story |
| 4 | 1987–1991 | GENL #96 | स्वर्ग की तबाही | Swarg Ki Tabahi | The Annihilation of The Mutants | Solo | Anupam Sinha | Anupam Sinha | Concluding part of the two-part story Introduces Chandika. |
| 5 | 1987–1991 | GENL #116 | मौत का ओलंपिक | Maut Ka Olympic | The Deadly Games | Solo | Anupam Sinha | Anupam Sinha | Dhruva's arch enemy Grand Master Robo made his first appearance |
| 6 | 1987–1991 | GENL #138 | समुद्र का शैतान | Samudra Ka Shaitan | Sea Monster | Solo | Anupam Sinha | Anupam Sinha | |
| 7 | 1987–1991 | GENL #140 | बर्फ की चिता | Barf Ki Chita | Mysterious Mountains | Solo | Anupam Sinha | Anupam Sinha | Dhruva's friend Jingaloo (Yeti) made his first appearance and introduction. |
| 8 | 1987–1991 | GENL #146 | रूहों का शिकंजा | Ruhon Ka Shikanja | Ghost From The Past | Solo | Anupam Sinha | Anupam Sinha | |
| 9 | 1987–1991 | GENL #147 | लहू के प्यासे | Lahoo Ke Pyaase | Operation Desert Storm | Solo | Anupam Sinha | Anupam Sinha | Original cover art Cover art for the reprints |
| 10 | 1987–1991 | GENL #179 | महामानव | Mahamanav | Mahamanav | Solo | Anupam Sinha | Anupam Sinha | |
| 11 | 1987–1991 | GENL #185 | वू डू | Voodoo | Voodoo | Solo | Anupam Sinha | Anupam Sinha | |
| 12 | 1987–1991 | GENL #193 | मुझे मौत चाहिए | Mujhe Maut Chahiye | Death Wish | Solo | Anupam Sinha | Anupam Sinha | |
| 13 | 1987–1991 | GENL #222 | बहरी मौत | Bahari Maut | Deaf Death | Solo | Anupam Sinha | Anupam Sinha | |
| 14 | 1987–1991 | GENL #230 | उड़नतश्तरी के बंधक | Udantashtari Ke Bandhak | Hostages Of The Flying Saucer | Solo | Anupam Sinha | Anupam Sinha | |
| 15 | 1987–1991 | GENL #246 | एक दिन की मौत | Ek Din Ki Maut | Death For One Day | Solo | Anupam Sinha | Anupam Sinha | |
| 16 | 1987–1991 | SPCL #1 | नागराज और सुपर कमांडो ध्रुव | Nagraj aur Super Commando Dhruva | Nagraj and Super Commando Dhruva | Two-hero: Dhruva & Nagraj Guest Appearances: Parmanu, Vinashdoot & Gagan | Chandu | Sanjay Gupta | First special issue published by Raj Comics. It brought Nagraj and Dhruva together for the first time |
| 17 | 1987–1991 | SPCL #2 | ग्रैंड मास्टर रोबो | Grand Master Robo | Grand Master Robo | Solo | Anupam Sinha | Anupam Sinha | Dhruva's first solo special issue |
| 18 | 1987–1991 | GENL #255 | विनाश के वृक्ष | Vinaash Ke Vriksha | Trees Of Destruction | Solo | Anupam Sinha | Anupam Sinha | |
| 19 | 1987–1991 | GENL #285 | चैम्पियन किलर | Champion Killer | Champion Killer | Solo | Anupam Sinha | Anupam Sinha | First part of a two-part story |
| 20 | 1987–1991 | GENL #290 | आखिरी दांव | Aakhiri Daanv | Final Move | Solo | Anupam Sinha | Anupam Sinha | Concluding part of the two-part story |
| 21 | 1987–1991 | SPCL #6 | आवाज की तबाही | Aawaj Ki Tabaahi | Destruction Of Voice | Solo | Anupam Sinha | Anupam Sinha | |
| 22 | 1987–1991 | SPCL #7 | खूनी खिलौने | Khooni Khilone | Killer Toys | Solo | Anupam Sinha | Anupam Sinha | |
| 23 | 1992 | SPCL #8 | नागराज और बुगाकू | Nagraj aur Bugaaku | Nagraj and Bugaaku | Two hero: Dhruva & Nagraj | Pratap Mullik | Sanjay Gupta | |
| 24 | 1992 | SPCL #10 | किरीगी का कहर | Kirigi Ka Kahar | Kirigi's Fury | Solo | Anupam Sinha | Anupam Sinha | Raj Comics released an animated commercial on various TV channels for promotion of this comic |
| 25 | 1992 | SPCL #13 | चुंबा का चक्रव्यूह | Chumba Ka Chakravyuh | Chumba's Trap | Solo | Anupam Sinha | Anupam Sinha | |
| 26 | 1993 | GENL #385 | विडियो विलेन | Video Villain | Video Villain | Solo | Anupam Sinha | Anupam Sinha | |
| 27 | 1993 | GENL #400 | पागल कातिलों की टोली | Pagal Kaatilon Ki Toli | Gang Of Mad Murderers | Solo | Anupam Sinha | Anupam Sinha | |
| 28 | 1993 | SPCL #17 | डॉक्टर वायरस | Doctor Virus | Doctor Virus | Solo | Anupam Sinha | Anupam Sinha | |
| 29 | 1993 | SPCL #19 | सामरी की ज्वाला | Samri Ki Jwala | Samri's Fire | Solo | Anupam Sinha | Anupam Sinha | |
| 30 | 1993 | Super SPCL #1 | फाइटर टोड्स | Fighter Toads | Fighter Toads | Multistarrer: Dhruva, Fighter Toads & Nagraj | Anupam Sinha | Anupam Sinha, Tarun Kumar Wahi | Debut issue of the Raj Comics superheroes Fighter Toads: a group of 4 mutant toads (Masterr, Computerr, Cutterr, Shooterr). This comic was released as a giant issue. |
| 31 | 1993 | GENL #450 | ब्लैक कैट | Black Cat | Black Cat | Solo | Anupam Sinha | Anupam Sinha | First part of a two-part story |
| 32 | 1993 | GENL #460 | रोबो का प्रतिशोध | Robo Ka Pratishodh | Robo's Vengeance | Solo | Anupam Sinha | Anupam Sinha | Concluding part of the two-part story |
| 33 | 1993 | SPCL #24 | आत्मा के चोर | Atma Ke Chor | Soul Thieves | Solo | Anupam Sinha | Anupam Sinha | |
| 34 | 1994 | SPCL #28 | वैम्पायर | Vampire | Vampire | Solo | Anupam Sinha | Anupam Sinha | |
| 35 | 1994 | SPCL #33 | सुप्रीमा | Suprema | Suprema | Solo | Anupam Sinha | Anupam Sinha | |
| 36 | 1994 | GENL #550 | दलदल | Daldal | Quicksand | Solo | Anupam Sinha | Anupam Sinha | |
| 37 | 1994 | GENL #560 | उड़ती मौत | Udti Maut | Flying Death | Solo | Anupam Sinha | Anupam Sinha | |
| 38 | 1995 | GENL #565 | चंडकाल की वापसी | Chandkaal Ki Wapsi | Return Of Chandkaal | Solo | Anupam Sinha | Anupam Sinha | Dhruva's last solo general issue |
| 39 | 1995 | SPCL #41 | मैंने मारा ध्रुव को | Maine Mara Dhruva Ko | I Killed Dhruva | Solo | Anupam Sinha | Anupam Sinha | First part of a two-part story |
| 40 | 1995 | SPCL #43 | हत्यारा कौन | Hatyara Kaun | Who's The Killer | Solo | Anupam Sinha | Anupam Sinha | Concluding part of the two-part story |
| 41 | 1995 | SPCL #47 | सर्कस | Circus | Circus | Solo | Anupam Sinha | Anupam Sinha | |
| 42 | 1995 | GENL #637 | भेड़िया की खोज | Bheriya Ki Khoj | Finding Bheriya | Two hero: Dhruva & Bheriya | Dheeraj Verma | Meenu Wahi | 2nd part of a 3-part Bheriya centric story arc |
| 43 | 1995 | SPCL #53 | हत्यारी राशियां | Hatyari Rashiyan | Killer Zodiac Signs | Solo | Anupam Sinha | Anupam Sinha | |
| 44 | 1996 | GENL #653 | मर गया अश्वराज | Mar Gaya Ashwaraj | Ashwaraj Is Dead | Two hero: Dhruva & Ashwaraj | Milind, Vitthal | Meenu Wahi | |
| 45 | 1996 | SPCL #58 | मौत के चेहरे | Maut Ke Chehre | Faces Of Death | Solo | Anupam Sinha | Anupam Sinha | |
| 46 | 1996 | SPCL #64 | कमांडर नताशा | Commander Natasha | Commander Natasha | Solo | Anupam Sinha | Anupam Sinha | |
| 47 | 1996 | SPCL #67 | राजनगर की तबाही | Rajnagar Ki Tabahi | The Doom Of Rajnagar | Two hero: Dhruva & Nagraj | Anupam Sinha | Anupam Sinha | |
| 48 | 1996 | SPCL #69 | सजाए मौत | Sazae Maut | Death Sentence | Solo | Anupam Sinha | Anupam Sinha | |
| 49 | 1996 | SPCL #73 | अंधी मौत | Andhi Maut | Blind Death | Solo | Anupam Sinha | Anupam Sinha | |
| 50 | 1997 | SPCL #78 | षड़यंत्र | Shadyantra | Conspiracy | Solo | Anupam Sinha | Anupam Sinha | |
| 51 | 1997 | SPCL #85 | महाकाल | Mahakaal | The Greatest Destroyer | Solo | Anupam Sinha | Anupam Sinha | |
| 52 | 1997 | SPCL #90 | प्रलय | Pralay | Doom's Day | Two hero: Dhruva & Nagraj | Anupam Sinha | Anupam Sinha | |
| 53 | 1997 | SPCL #93 | विनाश | Vinaash | The Catastrophe | Two hero: Dhruva & Nagraj | Anupam Sinha | Anupam Sinha | |
| 54 | 1997 | SPCL #100 | खूनी खानदान | Khooni Khandan | Killer Pedigree | Solo | Anupam Sinha | Anupam Sinha | First part of a 3-part story arc |
| 55 | 1998 | SPCL #105 | अतीत | Ateet | Past | Solo | Anupam Sinha | Anupam Sinha | Second part of the three-part story arc |
| 56 | 1998 | SPCL #109 | जिग्सा | Jigsaw | Jigsaw | Solo | Anupam Sinha | Anupam Sinha | Concluding part of the three-part story arc |
| 57 | 1998 | SPCL #110 | तानाशाह | Tanashah | Dictator | Two hero: Dhruva & Nagraj | Anupam Sinha | Anupam Sinha | |
| 58 | 1998 | SPCL #116 | ध्रुव-शक्ति | Dhruva-Shakti | Dhruva-Shakti | Two hero: Dhruva & Shakti | Anupam Sinha | Jolly Sinha | First Dhruva comic authored by Anupam Sinha's wife Jolly Sinha. |
| 59 | 1998 | SPCL #121 | जंग | Jung | Battle | Solo | Anupam Sinha | Jolly Sinha | |
| 60 | 1999 | SPCL #127 | दुश्मन | Dushman | Enemy | Solo | Anupam Sinha | Jolly Sinha | |
| 61 | 1999 | SPCL #130 | निशाचर | Nishachar | Nocturno | Two-hero: Dhruva & Doga | Anupam Sinha | Jolly Sinha | |
| 62 | 1999 | SPCL #137 | कलियुग | Kaliyug | Kaliyug | Multi-hero: Dhruva, Nagraj & Shakti | Anupam Sinha | Jolly Sinha | |
| 63 | 1999 | SPCL #154 | क्विज़ मास्टर | Quiz Master | Quiz Master | Solo | Anupam Sinha | Jolly Sinha | |
| 64 | 1999 | SPCL #165 | ममी का कहर | Mummy Ka Kahar | Mummy's Fury | Solo | Anupam Sinha | Jolly Sinha | |
| 65 | 2000 | SPCL #176 | कमांडो फोर्स | Commando Force | Commando Force | Solo | Anupam Sinha | Jolly Sinha | |
| 66 | 2000 | SPCL #185 | कोहराम | Kohraam | Furore | Multi-hero | Anupam Sinha | Jolly Sinha | |
| 67 | 2000 | SPCL #195 | बौना वामन | Bauna Waaman | Bauna Waaman | Solo | Anupam Sinha | Jolly Sinha | |
| 68 | 2000 | SPCL #210 | कालध्वनी | Kaaldhwani | Sound Of Death | Solo | Anupam Sinha | Jolly Sinha | |
| 69 | 2000 | SPCL #215 | शह और मात | Shah aur Maat | Checkmate | Solo | Anupam Sinha | Jolly Sinha | |
| 70 | 2001 | SPCL #220 | आया चुंबा | Aaya Chumba | Here Comes Chumba | Solo | Anupam Sinha | Jolly Sinha | First part of a two-part story |
| 71 | 2001 | SPCL #230 | चुंबा सम्राट | Chumba Samrat | King Chumba | Solo | Anupam Sinha | Jolly Sinha | Concluding part of the two-part story |
| 72 | 2001 | SPCL #235 | ज़लज़ला | Zalzala | Jolt | Multi-hero | Anupam Sinha | Jolly Sinha | |
| 73 | 2001 | SPCL #241 | आतंक | Aatank | Terror | Two hero: Dhruva & Nagraj | Anupam Sinha | Jolly Sinha | First part of a two-part story |
| 74 | 2001 | SPCL #246 | दुश्मन नागराज | Dushman Nagraj | The Enemy Nagraj | Two hero: Dhruva & Nagraj | Anupam Sinha | Jolly Sinha | Concluding part of the two-part story |
| 75 | 2001 | SPCL #259 | ध्रुव हत्यारा है | Dhruva Hatyara Hai | Dhruva is Murderer | Solo | Anupam Sinha | Jolly Sinha | |
| 76 | 2001 | SPCL #270 | शहंशाह | Shahanshah | King of Kings | Solo | Anupam Sinha | Jolly Sinha | |
| 77 | 2001 | SPCL #271 | संग्राम | Sangraam | War | Two-hero: Dhruva & Nagraj | Anupam Sinha | Anupam Sinha | |
| 78 | 2002 | SPCL #286 | शीतान | Sheetan | Snow Satans | Solo | Anupam Sinha | Jolly Sinha | |
| 79 | 2002 | SPCL #300 | ध्रुव ख़त्म | Dhruv Khatm | Dhruv is no more | Solo | Anupam Sinha | Jolly Sinha | |
| 80 | 2002 | SPCL #304 | विध्वंस | Vidhwans | Demolition | Multistarrer | Anupam Sinha | Anupam Sinha | |
| 81 | 2002 | SPCL #315 | परकाले | Parkaale | Bringer of Death | Two-hero: Dhruva & Nagraj | Anupam Sinha | Jolly Sinha | |
| 82 | 2002 | SPCL #330 | अंत | Anth | The End | Solo | Anupam Sinha | Jolly Sinha | |
| 83 | 2002 | SPCL #344 | संहार | Sanhaar | Slaughter | Two-hero: Dhruva & Nagraj | Anupam Sinha | Jolly Sinha | |
| 84 | 2002 | SPCL #350 | दूसरा ध्रुव | Doosra Dhruva | Another Dhruva | Solo | Anupam Sinha | Jolly Sinha | |
| 85 | 2003 | SPCL #359 | डिजिटल | Digital | Digital | Solo | Anupam Sinha | Jolly Sinha | |
| 86 | 2003 | SPCL #374 | ड्रैकुला का हमला | Dracula Ka Hamla | Dracula's Assault | Solo | Anupam Sinha | Jolly Sinha | Dracula Series- Part 1 |
| 87 | 2003 | SPCL #376 | आ मौत मुझे मार | Aa Maut Mujhe Maar | Come Death, Kill Me | Multistarrer: Guest Appearance: Dhruva | Prem, Rinku, Anu | Haneef Azhar | |
| 88 | 2003 | SPCL #400 | ड्रैकुला का अंत | Dracula Ka Anth | The End Of Dracula | Two-Hero: Dhruva & Nagraj | Anupam Sinha | Jolly Sinha | Dracula Series- Part 3 |
| 89 | 2003 | SPCL #420 | कोलाहल | Kolahal | Cacophony | Multistarrer | Anupam Sinha | Jolly Sinha | Dracula Series - The Concluding Part |
| 90 | 2003 | SPCL #445 | मास्टर ब्लास्टर | Master Blaster | Master Blaster | Solo | Anupam Sinha | Jolly Sinha | |
| 91 | 2004 | SPCL #470 | रोबाॅट | Robot | Robot | Solo | Anupam Sinha | Jolly Sinha | First part of a two-part story |
| 92 | 2004 | SPCL #485 | सुपर कमांडो ध्रुव | Super Commando Dhruva | Super Commando Dhruva | Solo | Anupam Sinha | Jolly Sinha | Concluding part of the two-part story |
| 93 | 2004 | SPCL #500 | सम्राट | Samraat | Emperor | Two Hero: Dhruva & Nagraj | Anupam Sinha | Jolly Sinha | First part of a two-part story |
| 94 | 2004 | SPCL #515 | सौडांगी | Soudangi | Soudangi | Two Hero: Dhruva & Nagraj | Anupam Sinha | Jolly Sinha | Concluding part of the two-part story. Cover also features other Raj Comics superheroes, but they are not seen in the issue. |
| 95 | 2004 | SPCL #525 | सर्वशक्तिमान | Sarv Shaktimaan | Invincible | Multistarrer | Anupam Sinha | Jolly Sinha | |
| 96 | 2004 | SPCL #540 | सुपर हीरो | Super Hero | Super Hero | Solo | Anupam Sinha | Jolly Sinha | First part of a two-part story |
| 97 | 2004 | SPCL #550 | फरिश्ता | Farishta | Angel | Solo | Anupam Sinha | Jolly Sinha | Concluding part of the two-part story |
| 98 | 2005 | SPCL #560 | राॅबिन हुड | Robin Hood | Robin Hood | Solo | Anupam Sinha | Jolly Sinha | |
| 99 | 2005 | SPCL #570 | चैलेंज | Challenge | Challenge | Solo | Anupam Sinha | Jolly Sinha | |
| 100 | 2005 | SPCL #585 | चक्र | Chakra | Cycle | Multistarrer | Anupam Sinha | Jolly Sinha | Has photographs of all credited people. |
| 101 | 2005 | SPCL #600 | मैड्यूसा | Medusa | Medusa | Multistarrer | Anupam Sinha | Jolly Sinha | |
| 102 | 2005 | SPCL #619 | बांकेलाल और कलियुग | Bankelal Aur Kaliyug | Bankelal And Kaliyug | Multi-hero: Bankelal, Bhediya, Doga, Gamraj, Parmanu & Shakti Guest Appearances: Dhruva, Anthony, Ins. Steel, Kobi, Nagraj & Tiranga | Prem | Tarun Kumar Wahi | |
| 103 | 2005 | SPCL #625 | मैं समय हूं | Main Samay Hoon | I Am The Time | Solo | Anupam Sinha | Anupam Sinha | |
| 104 | 2005 | SPCL #640 | भूचाल | Bhoochaal | Earthquake | Solo | Anupam Sinha | Jolly Sinha | |
| 105 | 2006 | SPCL #655 | मैच | Match | Match | Solo | Anupam Sinha | Jolly Sinha | |
| 106 | 2006 | SPCL #670 | नागाधीश | Nagadheesh | The Snake Judge | Two Hero: Dhruva & Nagraj | Anupam Sinha | Jolly Sinha | |
| 107 | 2006 | SPCL #680 | वर्तमान | Vartmaan | Present | Two Hero: Dhruva & Nagraj | Anupam Sinha | Jolly Sinha | |
| 108 | 2006 | SPCL #700 | फ्लेमिना | Flemina | Flemina | Multistarrer | Anupam Sinha | Jolly Sinha | |
| 109 | 2006 | SPCL #2245 | गुप्त | Gupt | Secret | Solo | Anupam Sinha | Jolly Sinha | In late 2006, the publishing company decided to combine the serial numbers of all its General(GENL) and Special(SPCL) issues, as a result of which the serial number of the titles jumped from close to 700 to above 2,000. |
| 110 | 2007 | SPCL #2260 | सर्वनाश | Sarvnaash | Havoc | Two Hero: Dhruva & Doga | Anupam Sinha | Anupam Sinha | |
| 111 | 2007 | SPCL #2265 | वरण काण्ड | Varan Kand | Varan (Marriage) Kand | Two Hero: Dhruva & Nagraj | Anupam Sinha | Anupam Sinha, Jolly Sinha | Nagayana Series - Part 1 |
| 112 | 2007 | SPCL #2270 | ग्रहण काण्ड | Grahan Kand | Grahan (Eclipse) Kand | Two Hero: Dhruva & Nagraj | Anupam Sinha, Lalit | Anupam Sinha, Jolly Sinha | Nagayana Series - Part 2 |
| 113 | 2007 | SPCL #2275 | स्पाइडर | Spider | Spider | Solo | Anupam Sinha | Jolly Sinha | Makadjaal Series- Part 1 |
| 114 | 2007 | SPCL #2279 | वेबसाइट | Website | Website | Solo | Anupam Sinha | Jolly Sinha | Makadjaal Series- Part 2 |
| 115 | 2007 | SPCL #2280 | हरण काण्ड | Haran Kand | Haran (Kidnapping) Kand | Two Hero: Dhruva & Nagraj | Anupam Sinha | Anupam Sinha, Jolly Sinha | Nagayana Series - Part 3 |
| 116 | 2007 | SPCL #2290 | शरण काण्ड | Sharan Kand | Sharan (Refuge) Kand | Two Hero: Dhruva & Nagraj | Anupam Sinha | Anupam Sinha, Jolly Sinha | Nagayana Series - Part 4 |
| 117 | 2008 | SPCL #2288 | W.W.W. वर्ल्ड वाइड वेब | W.W.W. (World Wide Web) | W.W.W. (World Wide Web) | Solo | Anupam Sinha | Jolly Sinha | Makadjaal Series - The Concluding Part |
| 118 | 2008 | SPCL #2310 | दहन काण्ड | Dahan Kand | Dahan (Burning) Kand | Two Hero: Dhruva & Nagraj | Anupam Sinha | Anupam Sinha, Jolly Sinha | Nagayana Series - Part 5 |
| 119 | 2008 | SPCL #2311 | फास्ट फाॅरवर्ड | Fast Forward | Fast Forward | Solo | Anupam Sinha | Jolly Sinha | |
| 120 | 2008 | SPCL #2335 | रण काण्ड | Rann Kand | Rann (Battle) Kand | Two Hero: Dhruva & Nagraj | Anupam Sinha | Anupam Sinha, Jolly Sinha | Nagayana Series - Part 6 |
| 121 | 2008 | SPCL #2340 | समर काण्ड | Samar Kand | Samar (War) Kand | Two Hero: Dhruva & Nagraj | Anupam Sinha | Anupam Sinha, Jolly Sinha | Nagayana Series - Part 7 |
| 122 | 2009 | SPCL #2355 | इति काण्ड | Itee Kand | Itee (The End) Kand | Two Hero: Dhruva & Nagraj | Anupam Sinha | Anupam Sinha, Jolly Sinha | Nagayana Series - The Concluding Part |
| 123 | 2009 | SPCL #2368 | ध्रुविष्य | Dhruvishya | Dhruvishya | Solo | Ved Prakash Khatwal | Anupam Sinha | First part of a two-part story |
| 124 | 2009 | SPCL #2372 | आखिरी ध्रुव | Aakhri Dhruva | Last Dhruva | Solo | Anupam Sinha | Anupam Sinha | Concluding part of the two-part story |
| 125 | 2009 | SPCL #2379 | गहरी चाल | Gaheri Chaal | Deep Conspiracy | Multistarrer: Dhruva, Fighter Toads & Nagraj | Sushant Panda | Anurag Singh | Swarna Nagri Series: Part 1 |
| 126 | 2010 | SPCL #2397 | लेवल जीरो | Level Zero | Level Zero | Multistarrer: Dhruva, Fighter Toads & Nagraj | Sushant Panda | Sushant Panda | Swarna Nagri Series- The Concluding Part |
| 127 | 2010 | SPCL #2399 | सुपर मैन | Super Man | Super Man | Solo | Anupam Sinha | Anupam Sinha, Jolly Sinha | |
| 128 | 2010 | SPCL #2411 | स्टेच्यू | Statue | Statue | Solo | Anupam Sinha | Jolly Sinha | First part of a two-part story |
| 129 | 2010 | SPCL #2419 | गेम ओवर | Game Over | Game Over | Solo | Anupam Sinha | Anupam Sinha, Jolly Sinha | Concluding part of the two-part story. This was also the last solo Dhruva title on which Anupam Sinha worked before taking an indefinite break from the character. |
| 130 | 2010 | SPCL #2422 | जीनियस | Genius | Genius | Solo | Siddharth Pawar | Abhishek Sagar | First part of a two-part story |
| 131 | 2010 | SPCL #2430 | अवशेष | Avshesh | Remains | Two Hero: Dhruva & Nagraj | Anupam Sinha | Anupam Sinha, Jolly Sinha | First part of a three-part story arc |
| 132 | 2010 | SPCL #2445 | चुनौती | Chunauti | Dare | Two Hero: Dhruva & Nagraj | Anupam Sinha | Anupam Sinha, Jolly Sinha | Second part of a three-part story arc |
| 133 | 2010 | SPCL #2446 | डैड और अलाइव | Dead Or Alive | Dead Or Alive | Solo | Hemant Kumar | Abhishek Sagar | Concluding part of the two-part story arc that began in "Genius" |
| 134 | 2010 | SPCL #2449 | हैड्राॅन | Hedron | Hedron | Two Hero: Dhruva & Nagraj | Anupam Sinha | Anupam Sinha, Jolly Sinha | Concluding part of the 3-part story arc that began in Avshesh |
| 135 | 2010 | SPCL #2453 | हम होंगे कामयाब | Hum Honge Kaamyab | We Shall Succeed | Multistarrer: Dhruva, Parmanu, Tiranga & All-rounder Vakra | Hemant Kumar | Nitin Mishra | |
| 136 | 2011 | SPCL #2466 | आॅल्टर ईगो | Alter Ego | Alter Ego | Solo | Hemant Kumar | Abhishek Sagar | First part of a two-part story |
| 137 | 2011 | SPCL #2472 | एक्स | Axe | Axe | Solo | Hemant Kumar | Abhishek Sagar | Concluding part of the two-part story |
| 138 | 2012 | SPCL #2482 | समुद्री लुटेरे | Samudri Lutere | Pirates | Multistarrer: Dhruva, Fighter Toads & Nagraj | Stuti Mishra | Nitin Mishra | First part of a two-part story |
| 139 | 2012 | SPCL #2495 | शो स्टाॅपर | Show Stopper | Show Stopper | Solo | Hemant Kumar | Nitin Mishra | |
| 140 | 2012 | SPCL #2516 | स्पेशल्स | Specials | Specials | Solo | Sunil Paswan | Nitin Mishra | |
| 141 | 2013 | SPCL #2520 | कोड नेम काॅमेट | Code Name Comet | Code Name Comet | Solo | Hemant Kumar, Sushant Panda (Page 58, 59) | Mandar Gangele | City without a hero series - Part 1 |
| 142 | 2013 | SPCL #2525 | ब्रेकआउट | Breakout | Breakout | Solo | Hemant Kumar | Mandar Gangele | City without a hero series - Part 2 |
| 143 | 2013 | SPCL #2527 | निगेटिव्स | Negatives | Negatives | Multistarrer: Dhruva, Nagraj, Tiranga, Doga & Parmanu | Anupam Sinha | Jolly Sinha | |
| 144 | 2013 | SPCL #2530 | मैक्सिमम सिक्योरिटी | Maximum Security | Maximum Security | Solo | Hemant Kumar | Mandar Gangele | City without a hero series - Part 3 Released in paperback and a special limited edition hardbound collector's edition. The limited edition had 4 additional pages featuring Nagraj, Shakti, Parmanu and Ins. Steel in a guest appearance |
| 145 | 2013 | SPCL #2532 | बेलमुंडा का खजाना | Belmunda Ka Khazana | Belmunda's Treasure | Multi-starrer: Dhruva, Nagraj & Fighter Toads | Stuti Mishra | Nitin Mishra | The concluding part of the two-part series that started in Samudri Lutere |
| 146 | 2013 | SPCL #2535 | सर्वयुगम् | Sarvayugam | Yugam Everywhere | Multistarrer: Dhruva, Adig, Nagraj, Shakti, Doga, Tiranga, Parmanu, Ins. Steel, Yoddha, Shukraal, Kobi, Bhokal, Gojo, Prachanda, Ashwaraj & Tilismdev | Dheeraj Verma | Nitin Mishra | Sarvanayak series - Part 1 Published in paperback and hardbound collector's edition |
| 147 | 2014 | SPCL #2541 | लास्ट स्टैंड | Last Stand | Last Stand | Solo Guest Appearances: Nagraj, Parmanu, Shakti & Ins. Steel | Hemant Kumar | Mandar Gangele | City without a hero series - The concluding part |
| 148 | 2014 | SPCL #2545 | अलादीन | Alladin | Alladin | Solo | Anupam Sinha | Anupam Sinha | Anupam Sinha returned with a Dhruva solo title after a four-year hiatus, his last Dhruva solo being Game Over released back in 2010. |
| 149 | 2014 | SPCL #2551 | सर्वदमन | Sarvadaman | Oppression Everywhere | Multi-starrer: Dhruva, Parmanu, Prachanda, Nagraj, Bhokal, Pret Uncle, Anthony, Doga, Shakti, Ins. Steel, Kobi, Ashwaraj, Shukraal, Gojo, Yoddha, Tilismdev, Tiranga & Adig | Dheeraj Verma | Nitin Mishra | Sarvanayak series - Part 2 Released in paperback and hardbound special edition |
| 150 | 2014 | SPCL #2550 | नैनो | Nano | Nano | Solo | Anupam Sinha | Anupam Sinha | |
| 151 | 2014 | SPCL #2557 | महामानव की गवाही | Mahamanav Ki Gawahi | Testimony of Mahamanav | Solo | Anupam Sinha | Anupam Sinha | Raj comics released Maine Mara Dhruva Ko Special Collector's Edition in 2014 with 16 new bonus pages. The events in these 16 pages occur between Maine Mara Dhruva Ko and Hatyara Kaun. These 16 pages were also published as a separate issue titled Mahamanav Ki Gawahi |
| 152 | 2014 | SPCL #2558 | नागायण उपसंहार | Nagayana Upsanhar | Nagayana Epilogue | Two hero: Dhruva & Nagraj | Anupam Sinha | Anupam Sinha, Jolly Sinha | A 32-page epilogue to the 8-part Nagayana series that concluded in 2009. It laid the foundation for the upcoming series Mahanagayana, a sequel to the original Nagayana series |
| 153 | 2014 | SPCL #2559 | सर्वसंग्राम | Sarvasangram | War Everywhere | Multi-starrer: Dhruva, Parmanu, Prachanda, Shakti, Tilismdev, Tiranga, Shukraal, Gagan, Vinashdoot, Anthony, Pret Uncle, Doga, Gojo, Bhokal, Ashwaraj, Kobi, Nagraj, Yoddha, Adig, Ins. Steel | Sushant Panda | Nitin Mishra | Sarvanayak series - Part 3 Published in paperback and hardbound special edition |
| 154 | 2014 | SPCL #2553 | हंटर्स | Hunters | Hunters | Solo: | Anupam Sinha | Anupam Sinha | Baal Charit series - Part 1 Published in paperback and hardbound special edition |
| 155 | 2014 | SPCL #2576 | सर्वसंहार | Sarvasanhaar | Carnage Everywhere | Multi-starrer: Dhruva, Tiranga, Shukraal, Gagan, Vinaashdoot, Nagraj, Shakti, Doga, Parmanu, Kobi, Ins. Steel, Ashwaraj, Tilismdev, Bhokal, Yoddha, Prachanda, Gojo | Sushant Panda | Nitin Mishra | Sarvanayak series - Part 4 Published in paperback and hardbound special edition |
| 156 | 2015 | SPCL #2579 | राजनगर रक्षक | Rajnagar Rakshak | Guards of Rajnagar | Two hero: Dhruva & Ins. Steel | Sushant Panda | Stuti Mishra | Rajnagar Rakshak series - Part 1 Published in paperback and hardbound special edition |
| 157 | 2015 | SPCL #2583 | फ्लैशबैक | Flashback | Flashback | Solo | Anupam Sinha | Anupam Sinha | Baal Charit series - Part 2 Published in paperback and hardbound special edition with alternative cover art. |
| 158 | 2015 | SPCL #2585 | मौत का मैराथन | Maut Ka Marathon | Deadly Marathon | Multi-starrer: Dhruva, Ashwaraj, Ins. Steel, Doga & Parmanu | Hemant Kumar | Anurag Kumar Singh | Sarvanayak Vistaar series - Part 1 Published in paperback and hardbound special edition. A spin-off from the original Sarvanayak series, सर्वनायक विस्तार literally translating to Sarvanayak Extended, is a sidequel series to the original Sarvanayak series. |
| 159 | 2015 | SPCL #2584 | सर्वमंथन | Sarvamanthan | Churning Everywhere | Multistarrer: Dhruva & Nagraj | Sushant Panda | Nitin Mishra | Sarvanayak series - Part 5 |
| 160 | 2015 | SPCL #2590 | आखिरी रक्षक | Akhiri Rakshak | Last Defender | Multistarrer: Dhruva & Parmanu | Dheeraj Verma | Nitin Mishra | Aakhiri - The Last Survivors series - Part 1 |
| 161 | 2015 | SPCL #2586 | हाइबरनेशन | Hibernation | Hibernation | Two-hero: Dhruva, Ins. Steel | Sushant Panda, Ravi Anand | Stuti Mishra | Rajnagar Rakshak series - Part 2 |
| 162 | 2015 | SPCL #2592 | परकालों की धरती | Parkalon Ki Dharti | Land of the Death Bringers | Multistarrer: Dhruva, Parmanu, Shakti & Bheriya | Dheeraj Verma | Nitin Mishra | Aakhiri - The Last Survivors series - Part 2 |
| 163 | 2015 | SPCL #2594 | ब्रह्माण्ड योद्धा | Brahmand Yoddha | Knights of the Universe | Multistarrer: | Dheeraj Verma | Nitin Mishra | Aakhiri - The Last Survivors series - Part 3 |
| 164 | 2015 | SPCL #2595 | सर्वसंधि | Sarvasandhi | Treaty Everywhere | Multistarrer | Sushant Panda, Hemant Kumar | Nitin Mishra | Sarvanayak series - Part 6 |
| 165 | 2015 | SPCL #2597 | विषपुत्रों का आगमन | Vishputron Ka Aagaman | Arrival of the Poison-sons | Multistarrer: Dhruva & Nagraj | Hemant Kumar | Anurag Kumar Singh | Sarvanayak Vistaar series - Part 2 |
| 166 | 2015 | SPCL #2600 | नो मैन्स लैंड | No Man's Land | No Man's Land | Solo | Anupam Sinha | Anupam Sinha | Balcharit series - Part 3 |
| 167 | 2015 | SPCL #2602 | राजनगर रीबूट | Rajnagar Reboot | Rajnagar Reboot | Two-Hero: Dhruva & Ins. Steel | Sushant Panda, Ravi Anand | Stuti Mishra | Rajnagar Rakshak series - Part 3 |
| 168 | 2015 | SPCL #2604 | विश्वरक्षक | Vishv Rakshak | Protector of the World | Multi-hero | Dheeraj Verma | Nitin Mishra | Aakhiri - The Last Survivors series - Part 4 |
| 169 | 2016 | SPCL #2605 | सर्वक्रांति | Sarvakranti | Revolution everywhere | Multi-hero | Sushant Panda, Hemant Kumar | Nitin Mishra | Sarvanayak series - Part 7 Published in paperback and hardbound special edition |
| 170 | 2016 | SPCL #2608 | राजनगर रीलोडेड | Rajnagar Reloaded | Rajnagar Reloaded | Two-Hero: Dhruva & Ins. Steel | Hemant Kumar | Stuti Mishra | Rajnagar Rakshak series - Part 4 |
| 171 | 2016 | SPCL #2609 | ब्रहमांड विखंडन | Brahmand Vikhandan | Fragmentation of Universe | Multi-hero | Tadam Gyadu | Nitin Mishra | Aakhiri - The Last Survivors series - Part 6 |
| 172 | 2016 | SPCL #2615 | सर्वशक्ति | Sarvashakti | All-powerful | Multistarrer | Sushant Panda, Hemant Kumar | Nitin Mishra | Sarvanayak series - Part 8 |
| 173 | 2016 | SPCL #2620 | फ़ीनिक्स | Phoenix | Phoenix | Solo | Anupam Sinha | Anupam Sinha | Balcharit series - Part 4 |
| 174 | 2017 | SPCL #2617 | राजनगर रणक्षेत्र | Rajnagar Rankshetra | | Two-Hero: Dhruva & Ins. Steel | Hemant Kumar | Stuti Mishra | Rajnagar Rakshak series - Part 5 |
| 175 | 2017 | SPCL #2622 | डैड ऐण्ड | Dead End | Dead End | Solo | Anupam Sinha | Anupam Sinha | Balcharit series - Part 5 |
| 176 | 2017 | SPCL #2623 | राजनगर उद्धारक | Rajnagar Uddharak | | Two-Hero: Dhruva & Ins. Steel | Hemant Kumar | Stuti Mishra | Rajnagar Rakshak series - Part 6 |
| 177 | 2018 | SPCL #2618 | ब्रहमांड विस्मरण | Brahmand Vismaran | | Multi-hero | Sushant Panda | Stuti Mishra | Aakhiri - The Last Survivors series - Part 7 |
| 178 | 2018 | SPCL #2625 | ब्रहमांड संहिता | Brahmand Sanhita | | Multi-hero | Sushant Panda | Stuti Mishra | Aakhiri - The Last Survivors series - Part 8 |
| 179 | 2018 | SPCL #2626 | ऐण्ड गेम | End Game | End Game | Solo | Anupam Sinha | Anupam Sinha | Balcharit series - Part 6 |
| 180 | 2022 | SPCL #2682 | शक्तिरूपा यथारूप | Shaktiroopa (Yatharoop) | | | Anupam Sinha | Anupam Sinha | शक्तिरूपा यथारूप में संकलित (स्त्रीभु, सिंधुनाद, मृत्युरूपा) |

== Other related titles ==
A list of titles related to Dhruva, however, the character itself doesn't appear in these titles.

- Soorma(SPCL #113): Nagraj and Parmanu fight against Dhruva's arch enemy Doctor Virus. Published in 1998.
- Dhwast(GENL #1168): A kid named Vishesh mimics Dhruva's fighting style at home by wearing his costume in this Ins. Steel solo title. Published in 2001.
- Warrior(GENL #1174): Cover art of this Ins. Steel solo title features a character that looks like Dhruva giving an impression that it's a two-hero issue however, Dhruva doesn't appear in the title. The Dhruva look-alike character on the cover of the title was actually a kid named Vishesh who wore Dhruva's costume and mimicked his fighting style at home in a previous Ins. Steel solo title Dhwast. Although he doesn't wear Dhruva's costume in Warrior. Published in 2001.
- Super Toads(SPCL #302): Fighter Toads argue over who is the most fearsome superhero amongst Nagraj, Dhruva and Doga. They decide to find it out for themselves by imitating the crime fighting styles of their favorite superhero. Cutterr becomes Super Commando Toad in a bid to prove that his favorite superhero Dhruva is the most fearsome. Published in 2002.
- Dead Force(SPCL #335): Dhruva's friend Chandika and arch enemy Dhwaniraj appear in a prominent role in this Parmanu title. In one frame, Dhruva's image is shown on a billboard that reads - Welcome to Rajnagar. Published in 2002.
- Super Indian(SPCL #610): Debut title of Raj Comics superhero Super Indian. Dhruva doesn't appear in the comic per se however, Dhruva's image is used for a single frame in the comic as a part of story narrative tool. Published in 2005.
- Yugandhar(SPCL #2528): The founding stone of Sarvanayak series; it had Adig, Bhokal & Yoddha as its principal characters and Ashwaraj, Gojo, Prachanda, Shukraal & Tilismdev in guest appearance. Dhruva's character doesn't appear in the comic per se, however, Dhruva's image is used for a single frame in the comic as a part of story narrative tool. Published in 2013.
- Adrishya Shadayantra(SPCL 2599): Aakhiri: The Last Survivors series – Part 5. It features Nagraj, Kobi and Shakti in prominent roles and Parmanu in guest appearance. Dhruva's character doesn't appear in the comic per se however, he is referenced on multiple occasions in the comic and appears for two frames as part of story recap and a flashback scene. Published in 2016.

== Limited series ==
This list enlists the limited series story arcs published by Raj comics featuring Super Commando Dhruva.

=== Dracula ===
Dracula series is a set of four comics that features the Raj Comics Iconic Superheroes Nagraj and Super Commando Dhruv in a clash with Dracula. Dracula series was written by Anupam Sinha and Joli Sinha and released in year 2003. The four part series consists comics namely Dracula ka Hamla, Nagraj aur Dracula, Dracula Ka Ant and Kolahal and considered as one of the best Raj Comics series.

=== Nagayana ===
Official logo of Nagayana series

Nagayana is an 8-part mega series featuring Nagraj and Super Commando Dhruva that was published by Raj comics in a span of 3 years from 2007-2009. It is a parallel series set in an alternate universe/parallel earth. It is a story based in 2025 A.D. exploring the future of Dhruva, Nagraj and their various other supporting characters in the alternate universe. The series was co-written by Anupam Sinha and Jolly Sinha, and the artwork for the series was handled by a team of various artists led by Anupam Sinha himself. Largely based on the Hindu epic Ramayana, the story of Nagayana as a whole as well as most of its sub-plots narrowly follow the same storyline as that of the Hindu epic with Raj Comic characters Nagraj, Dhruva, Visarpi and Nagpasha filling in the roles of original characters Rama, Laxmana, Sita and Ravana respectively. Earlier supposed to be a four-part series, this series was later converted into an 8-part series in order to fit in various sub-plots. The series ended with Dhruva and Nagraj sacrificing their lives to defeat Krurpasha (Nagpasha's alias in the series). Nagayana ends with the progeny of Dhruva and Nagraj taking over the responsibility to fight evil forces. Five years later, in 2014, Raj comics published a 32-page epilogue to the iconic 8-part series, thus laying a foundation for sequel to Nagayana, Mahanagayana.

Following is the list of titles published as a part of Nagayana series:

| Serial No. | Year | Title |
|---|---|---|
| 1 | 2007 | Varan Kand |
| 2 | 2007 | Grahan Kand |
| 3 | 2007 | Haran Kand |
| 4 | 2007 | Sharan Kand |
| 5 | 2008 | Dahan Kand |
| 6 | 2008 | Rann Kand |
| 7 | 2008 | Samar Kand |
| 8 | 2009 | Itee Kand |
| 9 | 2014 | Upsanhar |

== Kid Superheroes ==
Kid Superheroes is a series of free webcomic strips published by Raj Comics on their official Facebook page featuring the childhood versions of their superheroes. These strips are usually humorous and are targeted towards young children as part of a promotional policy to expand the publisher's reader base. Raj comics started publishing these free strips on their Facebook page in 2009. In 2014, they compiled these strips and published first issue of kid superheroes. Initially distributed as free gift with all online orders placed on 5 October 2014 - Free Comic Book Day, the issue was later sold commercially and became one of the bestsellers Raj comic title.

This table lists all Raj comic kid superheroes titles featuring Dhruva.

| Serial No. | Year | Issue No. | Comic Title Transliterated in English (Original Hindi Title) | Comic Title in English | Note |
|---|---|---|---|---|---|
| 1 | 2014 | SPCL #2561 | Hasya Hindola 1 (हास्य हिंडोला 1) | Comedy Carousel 1 | A collection of 22 short strips. Kid Dhruva featured in 4 of them titled-: 1. Modak Chor; 2. Don't Worry Mummy; 3. Cricket Match; 4. Super Bomb |

== Collected editions ==
Many Dhruva titles have been reprinted in trade paperback format. Some of the titles have been translated in English and published in trade paperback format.

=== Deluxe editions ===
- Nagraj-Pratishodh Ki Jwala Silver Jubilee Edition(DELX #1): In October 2012, Raj comics launched Nagraj-Pratishodh Ki Jwala Silver Jubilee Edition at the 2nd Mumbai Films and Comics Convention. It was a deluxe edition that collected the reprints of the debut issues of Nagraj and Dhruva on jumbo (34.6 * 24.8 cm) sized papers to commemorate the completion of 25yrs of the two most popular characters of Raj comics.

=== Special collector editions ===
These are special collected editions that collect all the titles of a single story arc or titles whose stories are closely related. Usually they are published in hardcover with alternative cover art. Sometimes they contain newly penned bonus pages.

| Serial No. | Publication Year | Issue No. | Title | Material collected | | Note |
| Serial No. | Publication Year | Issue No. | Title | Materials featuring Dhruva | Other materials | Note |
|---|---|---|---|---|---|---|
| 1 | 2014 | SPCL #2546 | Maine Mara Dhruva Ko Special Collector Edition | 1. Maine Mara Dhruva Ko; 2. Mahamanav Ki Gawahi; 3. Hatyara Kaun | | This edition collected a two-part story arc consisting of Maine Mara Dhruva Ko & Hatyara Kaun along with 16 never seen before pages exclusive to this edition in hardcover with alternative cover art. These pages were later published separately titled Mahamanav Ki Gawahi |
| 2 | 2014 | SPCL #2547 | Main Hun Bheriya Special Collector Edition | 1. Bheriya Ki Khoj | 1. Bheriya Kaun; 2. Main Hun Bheriya | This edition collected a 3-part story arc in hardcover with alternative cover art. |
| 3 | 2014 | SPCL #2548 | City Without A Hero Special Collector Edition | 1. Code Name Comet; 2. Breakout; 3. Maximum Security; 4. Last Stand | | This edition collected a 4-part story arc along with 8 extra pages. 4 pages that were also published in Maximum Security Limited Edition and a 4-page preview of an upcoming series Neo exclusive to this edition in hardcover |
| 4 | 2014 | SPCL #2540 | Sampoorna Nagayana Special Collector Edition | 1. Varan Kand; 2. Grahan Kand; 3. Haran Kand; 4. Sharan Kand; 5. Dahan Kand; 6. Rann KAnd; 7. Samar Kand; 8. Itee Kand | | This edition collected an 8-part story arc in hardcover with alternative cover art. |
| 5 | 2014 | SPCL #2560 | Khooni Khandan Special Collector Edition | 1. Khooni Khandan; 2. Ateet; 3. Jigsaw | | This edition collected a 3-part story arc in hardcover with alternative cover art. |
| 6 | 2015 | SPCL #2591 | Avshesh Special Collectors Edition | 1. Avshesh; 2. Chunauti; 3. Hedron | | This special edition collected a 3-part story arc in hardcover with alternative cover art |
| 7 | 2015 | SPCL #2603 | Shadayantra Special Collectors Edition | 1. Circus; 2. Hatyari Rashiyan; 3. Maut Ke Chehre; 4. Commander Natasha; 5. Sazae Maut; 6. Andhi Maut; 7. Shadayantra | | Hardbound special edition with alternative cover art |

=== Hindi digests ===
The following are collections of titles featuring Dhruva in trade paperback format.

| Serial No. | Publication Year | Issue No. | Title | Material collected | Note |
|---|---|---|---|---|---|
| 1 | 2011 | DGST #48 | Dhruva Digest 1 | 1. Pratishodh Ki Jwala; 2. Roman Hatyara | |
| 2 | 2011 | DGST #52 | Dhruva Digest 2 | 1. Aadamkhoron Ka Swarg; 2. Swarg Ki Tabahi; 3. Maut Ka Olympic | |
| 3 | 2011 | DGST #56 | Dhruva Digest 3 | 1. Samudra Ka Shaitan; 2. Barf Ki Chita; 3. Ruhon Ka Shikanja | |
| 4 | 2011 | DGST #60 | Dhruva Digest 4 | 1. Lahu Ke Pyase; 2. Mahamanav; 3. Voodoo | |
| 5 | 2011 | DGST #64 | Dhruva Digest 5 | 1. Mujhe Maut Chahiye; 2. Bahri Maut; 3. Udantashtari Ke Bandhak | |
| 6 | 2012 | DGST #68 | Dhruva Digest 6 | 1. Ek Din Ki Maut; 2. Vinaash Ke Vriksha | |
| 7 | 2012 | DGST #72 | Dhruva Digest 7 | 1. Champion Killer; 2. Aankiri Daanv; 3. Video Villain | |
| 8 | 2012 | DGST #76 | Dhruva Digest 8 | 1. Pagal Kaatilon Ki Toli; 2. Black Cat; 3. Robo Ka Pratishodh; 4. Daldal; 5. Udti Maut; 6. Chandakaal Ki Wapasi | |
| 9 | 2014 | DGST #92 | Dhruva Digest 15 | 1. Khooni Khandan; 2. Ateet; 3. Jigsaw | This edition collected a 3-part story arc with alternative cover art in paperback. |
| 10 | 2014 | DGST #96 | Dhruva Digest 9 | 1. Grand Master Robo; 2. Aawaj Ki Tabahi; 3. Khooni Khilone; 4. Kirigi Ka Kahar | |
| 11 | 2015 | DGST #99 | Dhruva Digest 10 | 1. Chumba Ka Chakravyuh; 2. Doctor Virus; 3. Samri Ki Jwala | |
| 12 | 2015 | DGST #105 | Dhruva Digest 11 | 1. Aatma Ke Chor; 2. Vampire; 3. Supreema | |
| 13 | 2015 | DGST #107 | Nagraj Digest 34 | 1. Avshesh; 2. Chunauti; 3. Hedron | |
| 14 | 2015 | DGST #108 | Dhruva Digest 13 | 1. Circus; 2. Hatyari Rashiyan; 3. Maut Ke Chehre; 4. Commander Natasha | |
| 15 | 2015 | DGST #109 | Dhruva Digest 14 | 1. Sazae Maut; 2. Andhi Maut; 3. Shadayantra; 4. Mahakaal | |
| 16 | 2015 | DGST #111 | Dhruva Digest 16 | 1. Dhruva-Shakti; 2. Jung; 3. Dushman | |
| 17 | 2016 | DGST #112 | Dhruva Digest 17 | 1. Quiz Master; 2. Mummy Ka Kahar; 3. Commando Force | |
| 18 | 2016 | DGST #114 | Dhruva Digest 18 | 1. Bauna Waman; 2. Kaal Dhwani; 3. Sheh aur Maat | |

=== English digests ===
The following trade paperbacks collected English translated versions of titles featuring Dhruva.

| Serial No. | Publication Year | Issue No. | Title | Material collected |
|---|---|---|---|---|
| 1 | 2012 | DGTP #2 | Nagraj Digest 2 | 1. The Doom of Rajnagar; 2. Doom's Day |
| 2 | 2013 | DGET #1 | Dhruva Digest 1 | 1. The Vengeance; 2. The Roman Assassin; 3. The Rise of Mutants; 4. The Annihilation of The Mutants; 5. The Deadly Games; 6. Sea Monster |
| 3 | 2013 | DGET #2 | Dhruva Digest 2 | 1. Mysterious Mountains; 2. Ghost From The Past; 3. Operation Desert Storm; 4. Mahamanav; 5. Voodoo; 6. Death Wish |

=== Miscellaneous Hindi digests ===
Following trade paperbacks collected one or more, but not all, titles featuring Dhruva.

| Serial No. | Publication Year | Issue No. | Title | Material collected | | Note |
| Serial No. | Publication Year | Issue No. | Title | Materials featuring Dhruva | Other materials | Note |
|---|---|---|---|---|---|---|
| 1 | 2013 | DGST #85 | Nagraj Digest 12 | 1. Nagraj aur Super Commando Dhruva; 2. Nagraj aur Bugaku | 1. Nagina Ka Jaal | |
| 2 | 2014 | DGST #89 | Bheriya Digest 3 | 1. Bheriya Ki Khoj | 1. Bheriya Kaun; 2. Main Hun Bheriya | This edition collected a 3-part story arc in paperback with alternative cover art. |

=== Miscellaneous English digests ===
Following trade paperbacks collected English reprints of Raj Comics titles featuring Dhruva in one or more, but not all, of its collected material.

| Serial No. | Publication Year | Issue No. | Title | Material collected | |
| Serial No. | Publication Year | Issue No. | Title | Materials featuring Dhruva | Other materials |
|---|---|---|---|---|---|
| 1 | 2012 | DGTP #1 | Nagraj Digest 1 | 1. The Catastrophe | 1. Naagin; 2. Poison Nector |
