= Anupam Sinha =

Indian artist

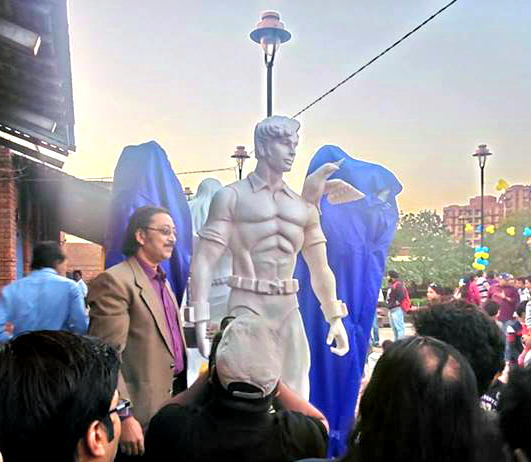
- Anupam Sinha with the unveiled statue of his popular comic book superhero Super Commando Dhruva, at Comics Fest India, 2013
- Born: Anupam Sinha; 13 February 1962 (age 64) Kanpur, Uttar Pradesh
- Areas: Cartoonist, Writer, Penciller, Inker, Letterer
- Notable works: The Virtuals, Super Commando Dhruva, Nagraj

Anupam Sinha is an Indian comic book artist and writer, credited as the creator of the Raj Comics superhero Super Commando Dhruva. The BusinessWorld website said that Sinha revolutionised Indian comics with his work at Raj Comics.

Cover art of Super Commando Dhruva

== Career ==
Starting his career in 1975 at the age of 13 for a small magazine called Deewana Tej at Kanpur, Sinha got his “big break” four years later, when he joined Diamond Comics. While working on popular comics such as Tauji aur Jadoo Ka Danda, Tauji aur Jadugar Sambha, Lalchi Jadugar and Atyachari Ka Atank. Sinha also attended Kanpur’s Christchurch College. He worked with Diamond Comics creating Fauladi Singh comics Fauladi Singh Aur Shaitan Tarwill, Fauladi Singh Ki Tarwill se Takkar and Fauladi Singh aur Vinash Ke Pujari. In 2012, he published his very first full-length fiction, The Virtuals.

== Raj Comics ==
Anupam Sinha joined Raj Comics in 1987 and created Super Commando Dhruva which took the markets by storm. Due to widespread success of the narratives Sinha used to construct, he was given the task of expanding Nagraj universe. Beginning from 1995, Sinha penned many Nagraj Comics and evolved the universe to cater to a mature audience. After a brief hiatus from Nagraj, Sinha is now helming Nagraj again with Manoj Gupta in their latest and most ambitious project yet, Sarpsatra. This is also the first series to bring together the characters Nagraj and Tausi. Tausi was originally owned by Tulsi Comics but acquired by Raj Comics in 2016.

== Diamond Comics ==
DC#	Character / Series	Name	Artist	Writer	Writer
32	Fauladi Singh	Khatarnak Shadiyantra	Anupam Sinha		
40	Fauladi Singh	Parmanu Bomb Ke Chor	Anupam Sinha		Part 1
42	Fauladi Singh	Shikanja	Anupam Sinha		Part 2
49	Tau Ji	Jadu Ka Danda	Anupam Sinha		
51	Fauladi Singh	Shaitan Tarwill	Anupam Sinha		Part 1
58	Fauladi Singh	Tarwill Se Takkar	Anupam Sinha		Part 2
60	Tau Ji	Jadugar Sambha	Anupam Sinha	Rajiv	
76	Tau Ji	Lalchi Jadugar	Anupam Sinha		
82	Lambu Motu	Gaddaron Ki Toli	Anupam Sinha		Part 1
85	Lambu Motu	Gaddaron Ka Vinash	Anupam Sinha		Part 2
101	Fauladi Singh	Vinash Ke Pujari	Anupam Sinha		
134	Tau Ji	Atyachri Ka Atank	Anupam Sinha		

== See also ==
- Chitra Bharti Kathamala
- Diamond Comics
- Super Commando Dhruva
- Fauladi Singh
