= Chitra Bharti Kathamala =

Chitra Bharti Kathamala was a popular Indian comic book publication during the early 1980s. It was the comic publication line of one of the India's biggest publishers of Engineering and technical books - S.Chand and Company Ltd, New Delhi. They finally ended publishing comics in the late 1980s due to an increasingly competitive market in India with Western comics publishers.

== Head Office ==
The head office of Chitra Bharti Kathamala was S.Chand and Company Ltd. Raamnagar, New Delhi, Pin 110055. The company still publishes educational books, and its head office remains the same. They, however, do not publish the comic series any more.

== Frequency/ Language ==
The Chitra Bharti Kathamala enjoyed moderate success. The company used to publish one comic every fortnight making it a total of 24 issues in a year. The comics were published both in Hindi and English languages.

== Characters and Themes ==
The following were the regular characters in the Chitra Bharti Kathamala Universe:

- Secret Agent 005 - Junior James Bond
- Space Star (Captain Gaurav)
- Private Detective Kapil
- Chandru
- Manasputra
- Bhabhi Ji
- Chocolate (Collection)

Apart from these regular characters, themes ranged from fairy and knight tales, general, social and comical stories to the biographies of historical personalities and details of historical monuments and events.

== List of Chitra Bharti Kathamala ==
Issue No.	Title	English Title	Series
001	Jai Bharat	Jai Bharat	
002	Chandrahaas		
003	Bahadurshah Jafar	Bahadurshah Jafar	
004	Dhruvtara	Dhruv Tara	
005	Shaitaan ka Shadyantra	Devil's Web	
006	Chauptanand	Chaupatanand	
007	Munshi Totaram ki Swargyatra	Munshi Tota Ram In Heaven	
008	Samudra ka Shaitaan	The Sea Monster	
009	Chittor ka Chiraag	The Gallants of Chittor	
010	Hatyaa ka Jaal		(Secret Agent 005 - Junior James Bond: 1)
011	Bolta Ped	The Talking Tree	
012	Watan Ke Saudagar	The Traitors	(Secret Agent 005 - Junior James Bond: 2)
013	Rahasyamaya Grah	The Mysterious Planet	(Space Star: 1)
014	Kaali Billi	Black Cat	
015	Nawaab Latpat	Nawab Latpat	
016	Jail Ki Hawaa	Back To The Jail	(Secret Agent 005 - Junior James Bond: 3)
017	Dhurt Mantri	The Wicked Minister	
018	Jaadugar Chakram	Wisdom Of A Prince	
019	Naagkanya	The Serpent Girl	
020	Zahareeley Baune	Space City XVII	(Space Star: 2)
021	Chaandi Ka Pahaad	The Silver Mountain	
022	Swarg Ka Neta - Madari Lal	Madari Laal The Leader Of The Heaven	
023	Mister Champat	Mr. Champat/Hunt For The Will	
024	Uranium ke Chor	Smuggling In Space	(Space Star: 3)
025	Time Bomb		(Secret Agent 005 - Junior James Bond: 4)
026	Veerdhwaj	Veerdhwaj	
027	Qaatil Mere Peechhe		(Secret Agent 005 - Junior James Bond: 5)
028	Begam Samru		
029	Swatantrata Ke Karnadhaar Motilal Nehru		
030	Vinash Ke Putle	Messengers Of Doom	(Space Star: 4)
031	Peeli Kothi	The Deserted House	
032	Khoon Ke Baad Khoon		(Secret Agent 005 - Junior James Bond: 6)
033	Rashtra Nayak Jawaharlal Nehru	Leader of the Nation-Jawahar Lal Nehru	
034	Videshi Qatil	International Killer	(Secret Agent 005 - Junior James Bond: 7)
035	Bam Bam Puran		
036	Shalimar Ke Chor	Thieves Of Shalimar	(Private Detective Kapil: 1)
037	Nakli Goli Asli Maut	The Invisible Killer	(Private Detective Kapil: 2)
038	Mitti Ki Rajkumari	Clay Princess	
039	Hindu, Muslim, Sikh, Isai, Ham Sab Hain Bhai Bhai		(Secret Agent 005 - Junior James Bond: 8)
040	Chamatkari Singhasan	The Miracle Throne	
041	Maut Ka Farista	Vengeance Is Mine	(Private Detective Kapil: 3)
042	Anokha Chor - RamKishore	Thief With A Difference	(Secret Agent 005 - Junior James Bond: 9)
043	Bharat Ratna - Indira Gandhi		
044	Amar Shaheed Veer Singh	Veer Singh The Immortal Son Of India	
045	Surya Ki Beti		
046	Nikamma Nagar		
047	Gappiram Aur Murkhanand		
048	Dracula Aur Dragon		(Chandru: 1)
049	Mahamaya Ki Talwaar	The Sword Of Mahamaya	(Manas Putra: 1)
050	Begum Hazrat Mahal		
051	Do Badmash, Hua Sarvnash		(Secret Agent 005 - Junior James Bond: 10)
052	Kakori Ke Shaheed	The Martyrs of Kakori	
053	Anokha Computer		(Secret Agent 005 - Junior James Bond: 11)
054	Akkad Bakkad		
055	Mahakali Ki Swarn Mudrayen	The Gold Coins Of Mahakali	
056	Jebkatra Natwarlal		(Chandru: 2)
057	Mahabali Balram		
058	Urvashi	Urvashi	
059	Suryamani	The Sun-Jewel	
060	Baaton Ka Badshah		
061	Black Hole	Black Hole	(Manas Putra: 2)
062	Dhanwaan Bhikhari		
063	Khatarnak Hatyare, Itne Sare		(Secret Agent 005 - Junior James Bond: 12)
064	Rajkumari Swapna Ki Wapasi	The Return Of Rajkumari Swapna	(Manas Putra: 3)
065		Strange Judgement	
066	Chor Kaun?	To Catch A Thief	
067	Aa Bala, Pakad Gala		(Secret Agent 005 - Junior James Bond: 13)
068	Hawai Ghoda		
069	Robo Cat	Robo Cat	
070	Jasoos Hue Fail, Mili Jail		(Secret Agent 005 - Junior James Bond: 14)
071	Nayee Saree		(Bhabhi Ji: 1)
072	Chamatkari Chhadi	The Magic Wand	
073	Luteron Ki Baraat	A Band Of Robbers	(Secret Agent 005 - Junior James Bond: 15)
074	Mahaan Khiladi		(Bhabhi Ji: 2)
075	Sheru Badmash		(Chandru: 3)
076	Adrashya Lutera	The Mystery Man	(Private Detective Kapil: 4)
077	Imaraton Ki Chori	The Theft of Buildings	
078	Diwali Ki Fuljhadiyan		(Bhabhi Ji: 3)
079	Papa Kho Gaye		
080	Buddhiman Tota		
081	Aafat Singh Ki Aafat		(Secret Agent 005 - Junior James Bond: 16)
082	Mahayudh		(Bhabhi Ji: 4)
083	Chitralekha		
084			
085			
086	Idhar Udhar Ki Baaten		(Bhabhi Ji: 5)

=== List of Chocolate Comics ===
Issue No.	Title	Main Story
001	Maut Ka Naach	(Private Detective Kapil: 5)
002	Roohon Ki Ghaati - 1	(Private Detective Kapil: 6)
003	Roohon Ki Ghaati - 2	(Private Detective Kapil: 6)
004	Roohon Ki Ghaati - 3	(Private Detective Kapil: 6)
005	Rahasyamaya Hatyara	(Private Detective Kapil: 7)
006	Kanoon Ke Lambe Hath	(Private Detective Kapil: 8)
007	Antriksh Ke Hamlawar - 1	(Manas Putra: 4)
008	Antriksh Ke Hamlawar - 2	(Manas Putra: 4)
009	Antriksh Ke Hamlawar - 3	(Manas Putra: 4)
010	Nashe Ke Saudagar - 1	(Private Detective Kapil: 9)
011	Nashe Ke Saudagar - 2	(Private Detective Kapil: 9)
012	Nashe Ke Saudagar - 3	(Private Detective Kapil: 9)

=== Sangam Series (Reprint Collection) ===
Issue No.	Title	English Title	Series
	Bahadur Shah Zafar/Chittor Ka Chirag/Begum Samru	Bahadur Shah Zafar/The Gallants of Chittor/Begum Samru	Veer Gathayen
002	Jai Bharat/Chandrahas/Dhruvtara	Jai Bharat/Chandrahas/Dhruv Tara	Pauranik Kathayen
003	Rahasyamaya Grah/Zahareele Baune/Uranium Ke Chor	The Mysterious Planet/Space City XVII/Smuggling In Space	Space Star
	Motilal Nehru/Jawaharlal Nehru/Indira Gandhi	Motilal Nehru/Jawaharlal Nehru/Indira Gandhi	Vibhuti Sangam
	Bolta Ped/Dhoort Mantri/Jadugar Chakram	The Talking Tree/The Wicked Minister/Wisdom Of A Prince	
