= Super Commando Dhruva =

Indian comic book hero

- Super Commando Dhruva in a poster by Sid Kotian

Publication information
- Publisher: Raj Comics
- First appearance: Issue No.: GENL #74 "Pratishodh Ki Jwala" (Published in 1987)
- Created by: Anupam Sinha

In-story information
- Full name: Dhruva Mehra
- Place of origin: Rajnagar
- Team affiliations: Jupiter Circus; Commando Force; Brahmand Rakshak (Protectors of the Universe)
- Partnerships: Nagraj
- Notable aliases: Farishta, Cracker, Cactus, Doove
- Abilities: Genius-level intellect; Ability to communicate with most birds and animals; Can breathe underwater; Master strategist, tactician, escapologist, detective & proficient in scientific knowledge and laws of physics; Expert stunt biker; Master acrobat, traceur with great agility and reflexes; Master of most martial art forms and hand-to-hand combat; Expert marksman; Master of disguise; Strong Sixth Sense; Great stamina & willpower: ability to withhold his breath for 20 minutes.

Super Commando Dhruva is an Indian comic book superhero character appearing in comic books published by Raj Comics. The character, created by writer and illustrator Anupam Sinha, first appeared in GENL #74 Pratishodh Ki Jwala published in April 1987 and since then, has appeared regularly in many issues published by Raj Comics. Super Commando Dhruva, whose complete name is Dhruva Mehra, is additionally referred to as Captain Dhruva by the cadets of his Commando Force.

Super Commando Dhruva operates in the fictional Indian city of Rajnagar. He is the founder of the fictional government-approved crime-fighter organization Commando Force. Dhruva's outfit is yellow and sky blue with brown boots and a utility belt with a star-shaped buckle. The star has almost become a trademark of the character. Dhruva does not have an alter ego and or any superpowers; but he makes up for that with his intellect, detective skills, ability to talk to almost every kind of animal, scientific knowledge, martial arts and acrobatic skills, unparalleled willpower and a determination to eliminate evil from this world.

Dhruva became a very popular character soon after he was introduced. He is one of Raj Comics' most successful characters. Over the years, Dhruva has acquired iconic status in the Indian comic book superhero genre. Fans have often raised the demand to convert Dhruva into a Bollywood movie character

== Publication history ==
=== Creation ===
In the late 1980s, after the initial success of Nagraj, Raj Comics wanted another superhero for its titles. It was in this period that writer Anupam Sinha came up with the idea of Super Commando Dhruva.

Dhruva's original design, as created by Sinha back in 1987, was an adolescent boy standing beside his bike wearing a yellow-blue trapeze artist costume, buttoned shirt collar, a black belt with star buckle, shoes (instead of boots), and with no gloves, mask, or cape, holding a helmet in his hand. The background of the image had a big star and behind his left shoulder was a box containing ध्रुव, Dhruva. Sinha wanted Dhruva to wear a helmet, making him a biker hero, but later on many changes were incorporated to the character's look, including the removal of the helmet.

Sinha wanted to break away from the cliché of superheroes with super-natural powers and alter egos. He wanted to create a superhero out of a normal adult human. Sinha, during the 2012 Indian Comic Con festival, recalled: "Children see the world very differently, and there is a reason for it. Every person seems like a giant to them and people can do something that they cannot. Like taking out a jar of toffees from the cupboard. And the adult is thus a superhero, because they can do something that the child cannot do. Kids see every person as a superhero. They are heavily dependent on other people. Tell me, when do you move out of reading comics? When you are an independent human being. Fantasy does not interest you all that much. The psychology of being dependent, of 'I must have a person along with me to protect me from any impending danger,' is essentially a child's psyche. That's why I wrote this character Super Commando Dhruva."

Sinha's first two characters, Space Star and Private Detective Kapil did not become very popular, but served as the early drafts for Super Commando Dhruva. The name Dhruva and the star symbol given to the character was inspired by Dhruva Taara (Hindi: ध्रुव तारा meaning Pole Star) which means someone who is determined, firm, and does not succumb to rough circumstances.

Thus, Super Commando Dhruva was born: a normal adult with no supernatural power but a strong determination and will to fight against the odds much along the lines of Batman of DC Comics. Most fans feel that Dhruva's character is a mix of Batman and Robin. On one hand, his crime-fighting style is very similar to that of Batman's and, on the other hand, his origin resembles to that of Robin's. In spite of these similarities, there are a lot of differences as well, most notably being the fact that Dhruva does not have an alter ego. Other similarities to the Batman series are, Dhruva does not kill anyone and his girlfriend Natasha is the daughter of a major villain Grand Master Robo. Batman's girlfriend Talia al Ghul is the daughter of Ra's al Ghul.

When questioned about the comparisons between characters of the Raj Comics universe and DC/Marvel universe at the 2012 Indian Comic-Con Festival, Sanjay Gupta replied, "We had to devise a character from our own imagination that didn't have anything to do with them (Superman and Batman). Because if we had kept in mind how powerful Superman and Batman are... We would've reacted to it and somehow allowed that to play a part in our creative process. Our first goal was to make a total Indian character. We didn't want to copy. That wasn't going on in our heads. But we were definitely inspired by them. We are still inspired by them. Even today we don't copy... We are inspired by them. After all, everything has an origin."

=== GENL #74 "Pratishodh Ki Jwala" ===
Dhruva making his debut in Raj Comics (Reprint photo)

Super Commando Dhruva made his first appearance in GENL #74 "Pratishodh Ki Jwala", published in 1987 priced at Indian Rupees MRP Rs.4. A general (GENL) issue used to be a 30- to a 32-page issue. Dhruva's first issue dealt with the origin of the character.

=== GENL #79 "Roman Hatyara" ===
In the next most important issue, GENL #79 "Roman Hatyara" ("Roman Assassin" in English) priced at MRP Rs. 4, Dhruva founded a government-approved crime-fighter organisation Star Commando Force. This is the second issue of Super Commando Dhruva series originally published in 1987. This second issue of Dhruva was Dhruva's first official case after his origin story (Pratishodh Ki Jwala). It's also notable as the first solo issue of Super Commando Dhruv where his picture is not featured on the cover art but antagonist Roman soldier assassin. In fact, the creator of Super Commando Dhruv revealed that Roman Hatyara "Roman Assassin" was the actual first comic book of Super Commando Dhruv to be published but he changed his mind, stopped its printing and re-wrote and released "Pratishodh ki Jwala" as first issue. This issue is considered one of the most significant initial all time successful comic book of Super Commando Dhruv. The story is a blend of history and mystery that grabbed and glued the mind of readers right at the first 2 pages. The story begins at a museum where a priceless artifact—an ancient Roman helmet—is stolen. Legend says the helmet belonged to a mystical fighter in Alexander the Great's army and grants superhuman strength to whoever wears it.

This issue is significant because it introduces the Commando Force—Dhruva's team of young cadets: Peter, Renu, and Kareem. It also features his sister, Shweta (who later becomes the superheroine Chandika). And the cover art by Vijay Kadam is iconic because it captures the "Roman Assassin" (the villain wearing the cursed helmet) in a battle with an elephant, rather than showing main hero Dhruva himself. This was a unique choice for a solo hero comic! While the original Hindi title is "Roman Hatyara" (GENL #79), Raj Comics released it in English under the title "Dangerous Device." The English versions of early Raj Comics are quite rare and highly collectible today as same as Hindi title. The image shows the original price of MRP Rs. 8 which was the standard for the English line at that time.

GENL #147 "Swarg Ki Tabahi" introduced Chandika, the main supporting character of the Dhruva series. Eventually, it was revealed that Chandika was his foster-sister Shweta Mehra. Over the course of the next few issues, some key elements were added to Dhruva's character including star-line, star-blade, a utility belt, ability to communicate with dolphins and ability to breathe underwater.

=== GENL #179 "Mahamanav" ===
Mahamanav (which translates to "Great Human" or "Super Human") is another classic, the name of one of the most significant and popular comics in the Super Commando Dhruva series published by Raj Comics in 1988 priced at MRP Rs 5. Mahamanav is considered a landmark comic in the early history of Super Commando Dhruva. It was one of the stories that helped solidify Dhruva's popularity and status as a top hero in Raj Comics, as he defeated a villain who was supposedly as far advanced beyond him as a human is to a monkey. The antagonist in this comic introduces the character also known as Mahamanav. He is an incredibly powerful villain with highly advanced intelligence and superhuman capabilities, often placing him among Dhruva's main rogues' gallery, alongside villains like Grand Master Robo and Chandakaal. Mahamanav is considered the all time gem of Dhruva's comics.

Sinha was very sure about one thing: minimal violence. He would not have Dhruva kill anyone as he wanted Dhruva to be a role model for young kids, his main audience. In the initial few issues, Dhruva carried a pistol as a measure of last resort, but never used it. (Dhruv used the pistol in Aadamkhoro ka Swarg. He used and fired two rounds on the Rhino-men in the Nagu Islands). This was the first and last time he ever used his gun. Soon after, the pistol was removed from the character.

During the initial few years, Anupam Sinha preferred to work alone on his brain-child Dhruva, both writing as well as illustrating all Dhruva titles on his own while the cover arts for the titles were mostly supplied by Vijay Kadam, an independent freelance artist.

=== Nagraj aur Super Commando Dhruv ===
In 1991, the Indian comics landscape was forever changed with the debut of Raj Comics' first-ever Special (SPCL) multi starer issue: SPCL #1 "Nagraj aur Super Commando Dhruv".

When Raj Comics decided to publish its first special (SPCL) issue, they aptly chose to title it, Special/Visheshank- SPCL #1 "Nagraj aur Super Commando Dhruva" which featured Nagraj and Dhruva in prominent roles alongside other Raj Comics superheroes including Gagan, Vinashdoot, Parmanu, Monty, Chandika, the Commando Force.

It was a multi-hero story and first multistarer of Raj Comics but mainly emphasized on Nagraj and Super Commando Dhruv over other star characters. For the first time, India's two comic book icons, Nagraj and Super Commando Dhruva, teamed up for an adventure that instantly became a success.

This issue marked a seismic shift in raj comics. It brought a grittier edge, notably showing Dhruva in a darker light as he took down criminals with lethal force, a departure from his usual characterization—a clear influence from the Nagraj and Doga writer at the helm. But the real story is in the numbers. SPCL1 "Nagraj aur Super Commando Dhruva" was not just successful; it was an unprecedented, record-smashing phenomenon.

It is widely believed that more than 1 million copies of "Nagraj Aur Super Commando Dhruv" were sold across the initial print run and subsequent reprints followed by the highest record sale of SPCL#8 Nagraj aur Bugaku (Estimated 2.5 to 3 million copies) and SPCL#10 Kirigi ka Kehar (Estimated 1 million copies).

Many fans estimated that Raj special one (SPCL#1) might have even reached the 4 million copies sold record which is more than special issue SPCL#8 "Nagraj and Bugaku" but it was never confirmed. However, this single title broke all records for a comic book sale of multistarer crossover in India and set the mark for the entire Indian Comic Book Industry. The spectacular success of this Raj Comics Special issue No.1 paved the way for a whole new era for Super Commando Dhruv and raj comics, followed by a chain of other Dhruv's monumental special hits like Grand Master Robo, Nagraj aur Bugaku, Khooni Khilone, Kirigi Ka Kehar, Awaz ki Tabahi, Doctor Virus, Samri ki Jwala, Atma ke Chor, Maine Mara Dhruv ko, Hatyara Kaun, Vampire and Chumba ka Chakravyuh — but it all started with this one, the comic that proved the power of the Indian superhero crossover as first comic book of Two heros together became the undisputed Sales King. Despite the huge number of prints in 1990, an original, first-printing, mint-condition book is very rare to find nowadays.

However, amidst the euphoria of record-breaking success, a significant portion of the readership later felt a sense of injustice regarding the portrayal of one of the heroes. Super Commando Dhruv's die-hard fans quickly pointed out what they saw as major flaws in the storyline, believing it weakened the Dhruv's character and other raj comics star characters. The core of the controversy, as in this issue, Dhruv was depicted killing a large number of criminals, a drastic and jarring departure from the "no-kill, no-gun" code that was foundational to the Super Commando Dhruv character established by his original creator, Anupam Sinha. This narrative weakness and the shift in character ethics were directly attributed to the fact that SPCL#1 was written by experimental publisher Sanjay Gupta, one of the owner and writer of Raj comics at that time, famous for the darker, more violent world of Nagraj and Doga, and not by Dhruv's creator, Anupam Sinha. This unique editorial decision created a fascinating but weak story, albeit flawed, piece of comics history—a testament to the clash of two creative sides, which ultimately proved no match for Anupam Sinha's depth of character building and storytelling.

=== Grand Master Robo ===
The next special issue was a landmark issue in many ways. Special/Visheshank - SPCL #2 "Grand Master Robo" was the first solo-hero special issue published by Raj Comics and Dhruva's first solo special issue. It is considered another most special and successful comic book of Super Commando Dhruv by Raj Comics and It added a lot of new elements to the character's story. This subsequent special issue, SPCL #2 "Grand Master Robo," was a major landmark in the history of Raj Comics. It holds the distinction and marked Super Commando Dhruva's debut in the premium "Special" format.

This issue is viewed as one of Super Commando Dhruva's exceptional comics, significantly enhancing the character's popularity and successfully helping him recover from the fan criticism received during his controversial portrayal in the previous team-up, SPCL #1: Nagraj aur Super Commando Dhruva. Indian comics experts under Raj Comics fandom believe that this issue is considered one of the best storylines in the history of Super Commando Dhruv that set the stage for the later published highly successful storylines of Dhruva's superhit issues like Kirigi ka Kehar, Dr. Virus, Samari ki Jwala, Khooni Khilone etc. The original first printing mint "Grand Master Robo" is very rare to find nowadays as same as SPCL#1 after 35 years in 2025.

Grand Master Robo, one of Super Commando Dhruv's most iconic arch-enemies, has his first appearance in two key comics, "major appearance" and "first appearance" in the Raj Comics continuity. His first appearance (Cameo/Introduction) was in the Issue Number GEN#116 Maut Ka Olympic (The Deadly Games).

GEN#116, that is where Grandmaster was generally first introduced, though his role and full impact was limited compared to his next full major appearance in the SPCL#2 "Grand MasterRobo".

"Grand Master Robo" is the comic that bears his name and is considered the first major confrontation and full-scale story featuring the villain. This issue is where he truly establishes himself as one of the Dhruv's major adversary.

While his initial cameo appearance is in "Maut Ka Olympic", the definitive debut that names the comic after him and solidifies his role is "Grand Master Robo".

This key issue introduced Swarna Nagri (Golden City), which is located at the base of the ocean and hidden from human eyes. Swarna Nagri is the home of Swarna Manavas (Golden Humans), descendants of Devs (Gods). Dhananjay, a warrior from Swarna Nagri, initially fought Dhruva, but became his friend and gave him the power to breathe inside water. This issue set higher benchmark in writing and presenting a storytelling in Comic books industry of India.

This issue also introduced Natasha, daughter of Grand Master Robo and Dhruva's love interest. Natasha went on to become the first and only person to know Chandika's secret identity. Dhruva's ability to communicate with animals and birds was well established but this issue explored Dhruva's ability to communicate with dolphins as well. In 1993, Black Cat (alter ego: Richa) was introduced in a self-titled issue to further complicate Dhruva's love life. Grand Master Robo is a key storyline that turned the Dhruva's life and well established all other characters introduced in this issue forever. The writer Anupam Sinha has said, in an interview, that he worked on this title during a period when he was in Mumbai (then Bombay), taking a break or hiatus from working for the Raj Comics. He famously incorporated a visual of the actual room where he was staying in Mumbai into one of the last panels of the comic as a personal signature or reflection of his working environment at the time. This detail is a cherished glimpse into the creator's process and makes the classic comic even more special for fans.

=== Nagraj Aur Bugaku ===
(The comic book with highest sales record of Raj Comics in 1993, India)

Special issue no.1 "Nagraj Aur Super Commando Dhruv" was the first highly successful multi super starter comic book. But there's one comic book of Super Commando Dhruv with Nagraj published in 1993 that smashed all time success and sales records in indian comics sphere, the second time when Super Commando Dhruv and Nagraj came together in SPCL#8 "Nagraj aur Bugaku". The issue number SPCL #8 was a twin super starer issue whereas SPCL #1 was a multi-hero issue featuring Nagraj and Dhruv together.

While the Indian market saw popular characters from other publishers team-up in the past, none—not a single title, could come close to the sheer, mind-boggling sales success figures achieved by Raj Comics' Special #8 "Nagraj aur Bugaku". This comic was not just a hit; it was a tsunami that swept the raj comics fans in the nation. Its phenomenal sales across all printings are an unparalleled feat that remains the single-issue sales record in the history of the Indian comic book industry. The event of Nagraj and Dhruv's first and second time meeting was, and arguably still is, the most commercially successful comic book moment India has ever witnessed. With success of special #8, setting a sales bar so high that it cemented the issue's legacy as the true commercial benchmark for all Indian comics that followed. Only Amar Chitra Katha (ACK Comics) is an Indian comic book publisher, could give challenge to Raj Comics sale records as ACK was also a very strong and popular comics publisher in the market, its comics are based on religious legends and epics, historical figures and biographies, folktales and cultural stories. Followed by ACK, Manoj comics was the powerful contender in the comics industry.

Initially, Dhruva's stories were detective-based stories, with science fiction elements as well. With the success of special issues, Raj Comics scrapped the publishing of general issues for its top two heroes Dhruva and Nagraj, although they continued to publish general issues for other superheroes. From 1991 to 1995, the frequency of Dhruva's solo general issues kept on decreasing and solo special issues kept on increasing.

GENL #585 "Chandakal Ki Wapasi", published in 1995, was the character's last solo general issue. Since then, Dhruva has only been seen in the special issues. With this transition from general issues to special issues, Sinha's storytelling also changed. Dhruva's comics now contain more science fiction-based time and space travels.

Instead of fighting thugs, he was now fighting against supervillains, aliens, and even demons. He was not solving cases anymore, but was saving the world from bigger threats. Although a few fans objected to this transformation of the character, most accepted this change. In spite of this flurry of sci-fi/mythical superhero acts, Sinha strived not to lose the basic essence of the character.

In the midst of these superhero acts, Sinha came up with some iconic and critically acclaimed issues exploring Dhruva's personal life and human side of his character. One such issue was SPCL #64 "Commander Natasha", published in 1996. This issue dealt with Robo's and Natasha's past and brought turmoil in Dhruva's love life eventually ending with Natasha leaving Dhruva and joining Robo's crime syndicate once again.

Although Dhruva's origin was explained very clearly in his first issue itself, not much was known about his family background. SPCL #100 "Khooni Khandaan" published in 1997 was a landmark issue in many ways. Not only was it the hundredth special issue published by Raj Comics, but it was also the first of an iconic three-part series that dealt with Dhruva's family background. Dhruva discovers that his biological father was actually a French citizen on the run, wanted for murder. What ensues was an emotional journey for Dhruva to prove his dead father's innocence and remove the stigma of being a murderer from his name.

SPCL #2245 "Gupt", dealt with the turmoils and side effects of being a superhero without an alter ego. A new supervillain Alchemist targeted Dhruva's foster family forcing him to wonder whether it was a mistake to become a crime fighter without a secret identity and jeopardising his family's security.

Around the year 1995, when Sanjay Gupta got busy with the development of a new superhero Doga, he handed over the job of writing and drawing Nagraj to Anupam Sinha. This paved the way for one of the greatest superhero partnerships in Raj Comics. Dhruva and Nagraj, though popular individually, failed to make a mark when they came together twice before, both issues were written by Sanjay Gupta. In 1996, Sinha came up with SPCL #67 "Rajnagar Ki Tabahi". This mega ninety-page issue brought the two superheroes together for the third time overall but for the first time under the writing of Anupam Sinha. It was a huge critical and commercial success for Raj Comics. Raj Comics went on to declare the year 1997 as Nagraj Dhruva Double Action Year. This year saw all Raj Comics heroes featuring in two hero crossover issues with each other. Nagraj and Dhruva too featured in two back to back 90 pages two hero issues that year, "Pralay" & "Vinaash", as part of the celebration of Nagraj Dhruva Double Action Year. Since then both Nagraj and Dhruva have appeared in many two-hero and multi-hero issues all of which have been huge hits. The biggest and most ambitious project of Raj Comics, "Nagayana", based on Hindu epic Ramayana, was an 8 part futuristic series set in an alternate universe published in a span of 3 years from 2007 to 2009. This series too was a two-hero project featuring Nagraj and Dhruva. Fans have likened the partnership of Nagraj-Dhruva with the Superman-Batman partnership in DC Comics, an invincible superhero and a superhero with no supernatural powers.

Dhruva was one of the few Indian comic book heroes that continued to be published regularly during The Dark Age of Indian Comics between 1997 and 2003 owing to his dedicated fan base. While most of the Indian comic book publishing companies were shutting shops, Sinha continued to give timely boosts to Raj Comics through Dhruva-Nagraj crossover partnerships.

In 2000, SPCL #185 "Kohraam" was published which brought almost all superheroes together. Eventually, in 2001, SPCL #235 "Zalzalaa" was published in which a superhero team "Brahmand Rakshak" (Protectors of the Universe) was formed, much on the lines of The Avengers from Marvel Comics, The Justice League from DC Comics & Defenders Of The Earth from King Features Syndicate. All Raj Comics superheroes including Dhruva became a member of this team.

From 1987 to 2010, Anupam Sinha worked on every single Dhruva solo title as well as most of the multi-hero titles featuring Dhruva. All these years, various writers worked on Dhruva (most notably Jolly Sinha) but Anupam Sinha was always attached to Dhruva titles in some or the other way, as a writer/co-writer or artist. In 2010 though, much to the disappointment of the fans, he declared that he will be taking an indefinite break from Super Commando Dhruva. He wrote his last solo title for Dhruva in 2010 and ironically, or rather aptly, titled it "Game Over". Sinha continued to work on Nagraj solo titles as well as multi-hero titles featuring Nagraj and Dhruva but stopped working on solo Dhruva titles. Raj Comics studio handed over the job of Dhruva solo titles to younger writers/artists.

Sinha always maintained a character continuity in his storylines throughout his solo and crossovers storylines. After Sinha left, with multiple writers working on the character simultaneously, it became more and more unclear as to which Dhruva storyline belongs to the original continuity and which does not. New Writers added subtle changes to the character, although keeping the basic essence of the character still intact. They tried to introduce some new facets to the character. The writer Abhishek Sagar tried to break away from the Anupam Sinha style of writing by giving his stories darker undertones. Even the artists showed the tendency to use darker colors in Sagar's stories, unlike Sinha whose artwork used to be brighter and more colorful. Nitin Mishra came up with contemporary storylines like 'Hum Honge Kamyaab' in 2010, which was his take on the controversies attached with the Commonwealth Games conducted in India in 2010. In this title Dhruva was shown to be more tech-savvy as compared to his earlier versions. In 'Samudri Lutere', Nitin Mishra showed a happier and brighter side of Dhruva. In this title, one of the Toads mentioned that Dhruva is a lover boy and Dhruva even displayed his musical talent as a good flautist. In Mandar Gangele's 'Gehri Chaal', Dhruva shot an ad for 'Anti-smoking campaign'. This was in contrast to Sinha's Dhruva who never showed any inclination towards music, acting or solving realistic cases based on contemporary issues.

In October 2012, Raj comics launched Nagraj-Pratishodh Ki Jwala Silver Jubilee Edition at the 2nd Mumbai Films and Comics Convention. It was a deluxe edition that contained the reprints of the debut issues of Nagraj and Dhruva on jumbo (34.6 * 24.8 cm) sized papers to celebrate the completion of 25yrs of the two most popular characters of Raj comics.

In December 2014, a series named "Bal Charit" was launched, with its first issue "Hunters" being released. This series is projected to be a milestone, with Dhruv's childhood to be told in great detail for the first time.

In 2015, "Rajnagar Rakshak" series was launched, with the first issue of the same name being released in January. This series is special because Dhruv is featured for first time with Inspector Steel in a 2 in 1 comic, despite both the superheroes being in action in the same city for a long time.

In September 2020, Manoj Gupta authored a short comic book featuring Super Commando Dhruva battling Depression. The comic book was released as a free for all special issue intended to spread awareness on World Suicide Prevention Day. "For writers Manoj Gupta and Ayush Gupta, the aim wasn't to spread awareness about mental illness but instead, to normalise it.", writes Dalreen Ramos in an article for Mid-Day.

== Fictional character biography ==
Dhruva was born to Shyam and Radha, two trapeze artists who used to perform in Jupiter Circus situated on the outskirts of Rajnagar. Dhruva was brought up in the circus itself. Growing up amongst the tigers, elephants, and other pet animals of the circus, Dhruva learnt to communicate with the animals. Dhruva was loved by every Jupiter Circus performer, started learning their respective skills from them. Strongman Hercules taught him bodybuilding. Ringmaster taught him how to control animals. He learned to throw knives from the knife thrower, along with shooting and bike stunts. At the age of 14, he started performing in Jupiter Circus shows and his stunning performances helped Jupiter to become a hugely popular circus. Boss, the owner of rival Globe Circus, hatched a conspiracy to destroy Jupiter Circus and sent Jubisko, his strongman and Bond, a sharpshooter to do the task. Jubisko burnt the Jupiter Circus killing everyone in it including Dhruva's parents. Dhruva who survived the carnage, vowed to avenge the deaths of his loved ones and eliminate the evil from the society. The series of events that followed resulted in the shutting down of Globe Circus as well. Later, the city police chief Rajan Mehra adopted Dhruva as his own son. Dhruva chose to carry on his struggle against crime choosing Rajnagar as the base of his operation. Later on, Dhruva founded Commando force to aid him in his operations.

== Characterization ==
=== Physical attributes ===
Dhruva is a young adult who started his crime-fighting career at the young age of 14. He is probably the youngest amongst all Raj comics superheroes. He is not really bulky, muscular or heavily built. Instead, he has an athletic, flexible and strong body. Although Spanish writer Chris Wright opined that the character "has the most pronounced calf muscles of any superhero".

The following are the vital statistics of the character as of 18 June 2007 as described on Raj Comics official website:

- Age : 23yrs
- Hair : Black
- Eyes : Black
- Height : 6'
- Weight : 78 kg

=== Personality traits ===
Dhruva comes out as a humble, gentle and down to earth kind of personality. He is a very soft-spoken and mild-mannered guy who respects his elders. He is always well dressed with a buttoned collar and sports well-kept hair.

Anupam Sinha knew that being a hero with no superpowers and no alter ego, Dhruva was probably the closest thing to reality in a world of comic book superheroes, a character that children could relate to, a character that children could try to emulate. Sinha wanted Dhruva to become a role model for the kids. He wanted to show the kids that one can be tough and well mannered at the same time. In Sinha's words: "I wanted to show that a well behaved and well brought up child should not fear being called a wimp."

Sinha also gave Dhruva a very 'morally correct' image. Dhruva has been shown to have the utmost respect for human life and has vowed not to take a human life ever. Dhruva never takes the law into his hands and always works in conjunction with the law-enforcing bodies. He believes that as a protector of the city of Rajnagar, his only job is to catch the criminal alive and hand him over to the police and the court shall decide the punishment for the criminal. As a result, there is always an air of uneasiness between Dhruva and some of his allies including Black Cat and Doga who do not think twice before killing a criminal, and he always makes it a point not to let them take the law in their hands in front of his eyes. Dhruva also does not hit a woman on principle. Even while facing a female enemy, he tries to disarm her without actually hitting or inflicting physical harm to her. Dhruva received such strong moral codes from his biological parents during his childhood and subsequently during his adolescence from his foster parents.

Dhruva has also been shown to be a man of his words and a one-woman man. Though a lot of girls swoon at him including his very close friend Richa (Black Cat), who loves him very deeply, Dhruva has always made it very clear to her that his heart belongs only to Natasha, his first love.

Though they act like a tough superhero, Dhruva has a sense of humor too. They often indulge in healthy sibling rivalry, leg-pulling and playing pranks with his foster-sister Shweta and loves his foster family very much.

Dhruva has never been shown to be a drinker or a smoker. Dhruva has been shown to be a non-vegetarian, or at least an eggetarian. This can be testified by the comic strip of page no. 5 of a comic named Grandmaster Robo (Issue No. 16 & Special Issue No. 2). The strip displays a thoughtful Dhruva mistakenly adding salt to Halua instead of boiled eggs.

== Powers, abilities and resources ==
Dhruva displaying his abilities in Jupiter Circus show

Dhruva has no inherent superhuman powers. His only supernatural power seems to be the ability to communicate with most animals and birds, which he learned in his childhood, while growing up in Jupiter circus, playing with circus's pet animals. He can communicate with various animals ranging from a dog to a lion and most birds. The only animal that he can not communicate with is a gorilla, as shown in "Bahri Maut". Dhruva can also communicate with dolphins, an art taught to him by Anna, who used to conduct dolphin shows in Jupiter circus. These animals often help Dhruva in various tasks ranging from transportation, reporting him of an occurrence of a crime in front of their eyes to even assisting him in his fights.

Another supernatural power acquired by Dhruva is the ability to breathe and talk inside water. Dhruva received this power as a gift from his good friend Dhananjay, a resident of Swarna Nagri, an underwater city located on the seabed not very far from Indian seashores, which is home to Swarna Manavas, the descendants/bloodline of Gods. Their technology is far more advanced as compared to humans which allowed Dhananjay to fit a chip inside Dhruva's neck by a short surgical procedure, thereby providing Dhruva with the ability to speak and breathe inside water.

Although Dhruva does not possess any inherent superpowers, he makes up for it with his detective skills, scientific knowledge and acrobatics and martial art skills. Dhruva is known to possess a high-level intellect. His deductive reasoning and lateral thinking combined with his presence of mind and scientific knowledge regarding laws of physics allow him to make innovative use of harmless objects lying around to defeat his enemies. Spanish columnist Wright noted that Dhruva "has a MacGyver-like the ability to use a paper clip or soup spoon to defeat enemies". Dhruva has been shown as the most intelligent and knowledgeable amongst all superheroes of Raj comics universe. He is a master strategist and tactician. In crossovers, the other superheroes make use of their superpowers according to Dhruva's plans to defeat powerful enemies. He is also a master escapologist. In 'Commando Force', Black Cat compares him to Houdini, while Nagraj once trapped in an enemy's trap wonders, "What would have Dhruva done, had he been in my place?" to get the inspirational idea.

Dhruva is physically very strong. He received strength training from Hercules, circus's strongman. He is also adept at trapeze, balancing and other acrobatic arts that he learned from his own parents. His body has great flexibility and great reflexes, so much so that he can even dodge bullets. He is expert in most forms of martial arts and hand-to-hand combat techniques. He is also an expert in free running and has been shown to jump, climb and swing through various obstacles and skyscrapers to chase down his enemies. He is an excellent marksman, thanks to the training he received from circus's knife throwing expert Ranjan and shooting expert Sulaiman. Though Dhruva despises firearms in principle, he makes good use of his marksmanship while using his star blades (Dhruva's personalised shurikens) to disarm or injure his enemy. Dhruva can even hit a target or fight an enemy blind-folded by judging the faint noises of their movements.

Dhruva is an expert biker and stunter. He learned stunt motorcycling from motorcyclist Pawan, who used to display his wall of death stunts in Jupiter Circus. Dhruva is so adept at controlling and balancing his bike that it is famously said that Dhruva's bike is nothing but a part of his body. Dhruva has been shown to have received special permission from the Road Traffic department so that the traffic restrictions including traffic signals, one way, overtaking prohibition, speed limits and other such restrictions that can hamper his duties do not apply to him. Dhruva is also a licensed pilot and flies his own aircraft/jets throughout the world.

Dhruva's greatest strength is the unparalleled willpower that keeps him going in the toughest of circumstances. He has been shown to possess the greatest willpower known to mankind. His indomitable will makes him rather immune from mind control, hypnosis and other mind tricks employed by his enemies possessing psychic powers. Such attacks rarely work on him, and when they do, Dhruva quickly manages to come out of their effect. Dhruva has also developed the ability to hold his breath for 20mins. which helps him against poisonous gas attacks.

Dhruva is also the founder and captain of a government-approved crime-fighting organisation "Commando Force", which has earned Dhruva the titles such as Captain Dhruva and Super Commando. Dhruva is also a master of disguise and has made full use of his talent in titles such as 'Lahu Ke Pyase' and 'Nagadheesh'. Dhruva has always had full support of the police department and full access to all police records and classified documents, not only because his foster father Rajan Mehra is the Inspector General of Police but also because Dhruva has always had the utmost respect for the law enforcing bodies and has never taken law in his hands. Later, being a member of Brahmand Rakshak, Dhruva, along with all the other members of the team, was honorarily awarded the powers and rights equivalent to a Commissioner of Police.

=== Costume ===
Dhruva used to wear a yellow leotard over a blue full-body spandex bodysuit, a brown belt with a star-shaped buckle and a pair of brown shoes while performing for Jupiter circus as a 14yr old. After the Jupiter circus carnage, when Dhruva started his fight against crime and evil, he continued wearing the same circus costume. Later, his belt was converted into a utility belt in which he could carry many useful items. Dhruva does not wear any cape, mask or helmet. Instead, as Wright pointed out, he prefers to sport a "solid-looking helmet of hair".

Sinha made the first and the only major overhaul to date in the character's attire ten years later in 1998. In the title 'Dhruva-shakti', Dhruva's sister Shweta, a budding scientist, gave him some assortments that included a metallic bracelet each for both his hands. While the right bracelet had a cartridge of star blades, the left had a cartridge of star-line. Dhruva could shoot either of them with just a pull of a lever as against the older days when he had to take them out of his belt pocket and then throw them manually. She also gave him a metallic utility belt as against the older leather one with a star buckle with built-in star-transmitter and a built-in locking system so that no one could cut or pull his belt off from his waist. She also gave him a metallic holding strap for his boots and a wheel cover with push-back wheels that would convert his boots into roller skates with the flip of a switch.

Apart from this, Dhruva's appearance remained unchanged throughout the years. Although Nagayana, the futuristic series set in an alternate universe, allowed Sinha to experiment with Dhruva's looks.

=== Equipment ===
Dhruva is not really into too much high tech gadgetry. Whatever little equipment he makes use of, most of them have the word 'star-' prefixed to them, which gives it a slight campy feel. Four things that really define the character are star-blades, star-line, utility belt and Dhruva's special motorbike.

Star-blade is Dhruva's personalised shuriken like a razor-sharp weapon. Although potentially lethal, Dhruva rarely uses them in a lethal way. Mostly Dhruva uses his star-blades to disarm his enemy or cut something. Dhruva shoots star-blades from his right-hand bracelet. Star-line, on the other hand, is a thin rope made of nylo-steel which can not be cut, burnt or broken easily. Star-line is attached to a star-shaped grappling hook at one end. Dhruva uses his left-hand bracelet, which contains a star-line, like a grapple gun and can climb up or swing from one skyscraper to another like Batman. Dhruva mentions in one of his titles that he should meet Batman someday and thank him personally for inventing this style which is very handy especially in case of traffic jams. He also uses star-line to trip or tie up his enemy.

Dhruva's preferred mode of transport is his special motorbike. The bike is specially designed and optimised to suit his needs. Dhruva's bike is remote control enabled so that he can start and operate his bike even from a distance. Dhruva's bike has undergone innumerable design changes from the old fashioned 1980s design to a modernised sports bike look. Among all designs, one common factor has been that the bike never had any attached firearm to it. It is said that the sound of the engine of Dhruva's bike is unique and different from any other bike and can be easily identified. Dhruva also owns a star helicopter, a star plane (a literally star-shaped plane painted half blue and half yellow), a sonic jet and a star-boat. The only significant omission from Dhruva's fleet of transport vehicles is a car that he has never owned.

Star-blade, star-line and motorbike are so significant to the character's identity that often, even before Dhruva himself breaks into a crime scene, a flurry of star-blades, a star-line or the sound of Dhruva's special bike announce the arrival of Dhruva.

==== Utility belt ====
Dhruva's utility belt is one of the most significant and defining characteristics of the character's appearance as well the character's most useful and important tool in his crime-fighting sojourn. Dhruva's belt has evolved over the years from a simple leather belt to a leather utility belt with pouches to a metallic utility belt. In its current version, Dhruva's utility belt is a metallic belt with an inbuilt locking system to make sure that no one can easily pull it off or cut it against his older leather belt. The star-shaped buckle has an inbuilt transmitter which enables Dhruva to stay in contact with commando headquarters, police force and even some of his allies including Chandika. Dhruva is known to carry a lot of utility items in his belt pockets. The various items that he has been shown to carry in his utility belt at various times include, but are not limited to, spare cartridges for star-blades and star-lines, acid capsules, signal flares, star cuffs (star-shaped handcuffs), a make-up kit and many more items. Dhruva also carries a special transmitter fixed at 'Brahmand Rakshak' frequency which enables him to stay in contact with the Brahmand Rakshak headquarters as well as the other members of the Brahmand Rakshak team. On some occasions, he has been shown to carry a separate Brahmand Rakshak transmitter while on other occasions it has been shown to be integrated with Dhruva's personal star-transmitter. Dhruva also carries a radiation sensor which is either fitted in his collar button or sometimes in his belt and blinks whenever there is a threat of a hazardous level of radiation exposure.

=== Commando headquarters ===
Commando headquarters is the base of Commando Force located in Rajnagar. It is the place from where Commando Force operates. It is equipped with state of the art technology and a computer system. Its system can perform various functions that include, but are not limited to, facial recognition, fingerprint matching, DNA matching, remote hacking of enemy's system and global surveillance through satellite imaging. Commando headquarters' system also keeps the data on every criminal, can access police records as well Interpol files on request. Teenagers residing in various cities of India receive special training at the headquarters from the Commando Force and then sent back to their respective homes. These trained junior cadets have special protocol to report any ongoing crime to commando headquarters and not getting involved themselves unless they are sure they can handle it. Dhruva has got surveillance cameras installed all over Rajnagar streets which are monitored at the headquarters for suspicious activities. Information on any suspicious activity caught by cameras or junior cadets, if requiring Dhruva's attention, is channelled to Dhruva on his star-transmitter. Dhruva himself patrols the city streets every night on his special motorbike. Dhruva's unyielding dedication towards keeping his city safe has earned him the title of 'Rajnagar Ka Rakhwala' (Keeper of Rajnagar).

== Supporting characters ==
Dhruva's allies clockwise from top left- Samri, Dhananjay, Kirigi and Jingaloo

Dhruva has a large range of supporting characters who have played significant roles in his story arcs. While some help to define the character of Super Commando Dhruva itself, other have played significant roles in giving a direction to the story arcs that they have been part of. After the death of Dhruva' parents, I. G. Rajan Mehra adopted him. I. G. Rajan has been a constant presence in Dhruva titles and has been very useful not only as the chief of police but also as a father-figure and a constant source of inspiration. When a supervillain Alchemist almost forced Dhruva into retirement by endangering his family's life by targeting Rajan Mehra and Dhruva's sister Shweta, it was Dhruva's father who motivated him to keep going.

Dhruva's Commando Force, a team of three trained cadets (Peter Massy, Karim Shah and Renu) has been another important support for him in his fight. Dhananjay, the descendant of Gods, is Dhruva's most powerful ally and a good friend who not only provided him with the power to breathe inside water but is also ready to help whenever Dhruva needs him and vice versa. But amongst a long list of supporting characters in Dhruva series, the most important character has been Shweta, Dhruva's sister. She has been the strongest pillar of support in Dhruva's constant battle against evil on many levels. As a little sister, she engages with Dhruva in funny sibling banter, cheers him up and makes sure he never feels sad or misses his biological family. As a budding scientist, she constantly provides Dhruva with innovative gadgets that prove very helpful to Dhruva during his fights. But the highest level of support she provides is in the form of Chandika, a blonde superheroine, her alter ego. Chandika has inherited her brother's fighting style. Like Dhruva, she too depends on brains more than brawn as well as on her self-invented gadgets. She is always there to help Dhruva whenever he is in danger. Dhruva who is very protective about her sister, under strong suspicion that Shweta is in fact Chandika, often reprimands her for putting her life in danger. But Shweta somehow manages to come out clean every time proving that she is not Chandika. Natasha is the only person who knows Chandika's true identity. Shweta eventually went to London in 2007 Makadjaal series to pursue her further studies. In Nagayana, when Shweta was presumably dead, although later revived, Natasha kept Chandika alive by donning her costume.

Dhruva has had quite a few love interests that include Natasha, Richa and Sabby. Natasha is Dhruva's arch-enemy Grand Master Robo's daughter. While Natasha and Dhruva's love is mutual, Richa and Sabby's love is more one-sided. Sabby is the daughter of another terrorist Abbu Salem. She never reappeared since her first appearance in 'Sarvanash'. On the other hand, Richa has been an integral part of Dhruva's storyline ever since her first appearance. As Richa, she has been Dhruva's best friend and as her alter ego Black Cat, a lethal superheroine with killer instincts, though initially rogue who later turned to the good side, she has been a partner and helper in many of Dhruva's fights. More so since Chandika (Shweta) has gone out of India to pursue her studies. In the alternate universe shown in the Nagayana series, Natasha has been revealed to be the lawfully wedded wife of Dhruva. Both have conceived a kid out of their marriage as well. Richa too bears Dhruva's child though as she pointed out, Dhruva never cheated on Natasha as his and Richa's baby was borne out of IVF technique.

Other significant supporting characters in Dhruva series include Jingalu, a yeti; Kirigi, a ninja fighter with yogic powers; Lori, a tantric; Vanputra who has the ability to communicate with plants and trees in contrast to Dhruva who communicates with animals; Barf-manava, possessing the power of ice; Saamri, the keeper of Jwalok, a secret city located inside a volcano; Vera Vicet, a French police officer who initially tried to kill Dhruva under the impression that Shyam, Dhruva's biological father, had killed her father but eventually realised the truth and became his ally and Nakshatra, a mirror image of Dhruva who, like Dhruva, was born and brought up in a circus and has pretty much the same abilities that Dhruva has. As opposed to Vera, Nakshatra tried to kill Dhruva's father I. G. Rajan believing that Rajan had murdered his father in a fake encounter but upon realising the truth, he surrendered to the police and when he came out after serving his jail sentence, he eventually became Dhruva's friend. In Nagayana, Nakshatra has been shown to be Shweta's love interest.

Dhruva has been a member of the superhero team Brahmand Rakshak. Dhruva has often teamed up with other superheroes, most frequently with Nagraj and occasionally with Doga. While Nagraj and Dhruva have grown to become thick of friends over the years, Dhruva-Doga relationship is a bit tenser because of the differing moral codes and the sense of justice of the two heroes.

=== Enemies ===
Grand Master Robo, Dhruva's arch enemy

Dhruva has his own rogues gallery filled with an assortment of villains that includes common criminals without any superpowers, supervillains, devils and even extraterrestrial beings. Dhruva's biggest arch-enemy and the most recurring villain in his titles is Grand Master Robo, a crime lord. Half-human, half-robot, Robo has a laser eye fit inside his left eyeball. Over the years Robo and Dhruva have developed a strange bond of hatred and respect. While Dhruva wants to arrest Robo, and Robo wants to kill Dhruva who always foils his plans, they also acknowledge the fact that if any of them hurts the other, it would eventually hurt Natasha, Robo's daughter and Dhruva's love interest.

Other arch-foes of Dhruva include Chandakaal, the last remaining demon on earth; Mahamanav, a highly evolved version of Homo sapiens with psychic superpowers; Dhawaniraj, a mad scientist whose power is lethal forms of sound waves; Dr. Virus, a biologist; Bauna Waman, a midget who uses toys as his weapons and Chumba, who possesses the power of magnetism.

Dhruva has always believed in giving criminals a chance to redeem themselves. Natasha, Nakshatra, Nostredamas and Black Cat are classic examples of rogues turning good by the Dhruva effect. Robo himself had a near change of heart but Natasha who had gone rogue because of rampaging corruption in the system, prevented him from surrendering. In 'Vinash', Dhruva convinced his foes to work with him as a team to protect the earth from a far greater danger. Dhruva has even fought against his best friend Nagraj when he went rogue.

Over the years Dhruva has come to gain the respect of his enemies as well especially the ones with great superpowers like Chandakaal and Mahamanav. In 'Jaljala', when Mahamanav sets out to kill every superhero, while he sent out his pawns to kill other heroes, he decided to kill Dhruva with his own hands considering him a prized cache. In 'Soorma', Dr. Virus who takes on Nagraj and Parmanu states that he had to shift his base from Rajnagar to Delhi for the fear of Dhruva. Chumba himself mentioned once that Dhruva scares him in his dreams. One common thing Dhruva's villains have acknowledged on separate occasions is that Dhruva is probably the most dangerous superhero because, unlike most other heroes who depend on their superpowers, he does not possess any weakness to exploit and they cannot anticipate what plan Dhruva's mind can come up with.

== Cultural impact ==
=== Merchandising ===
In the early part of the 1990s, Raj comics were very popular. They tried to encash their characters' popularity by a series of merchandise. These merchandise included stickers, magnet stickers, tattoos, posters, trading cards, wallets, T-shirts, dinner plates, jigsaw puzzles, face masks and stationery items themed on their superhero characters including Dhruva under a common trade name 'Nagraj Novelties'. The merchandise did not become very popular and eventually went out of production because of various reasons including lack of marketing, not licensing their characters to other more established merchandising companies and instead of keeping the rights to themselves and not making these merchandise widely available in the open market all over India through distributorship. Many years later, around 2010, with the advent of online shopping and payment options, Raj comics again tried to venture into the merchandising business which primarily included posters, calendars and T-shirts.

=== Critical reception and popularity ===
Super Commando Dhruva became a very popular character soon after his introduction in Indian comics. Apart from being popular among kids, even girls (owing to his smart looks), Dhruva also received positive reviews from parents for having a strong moral code, educative science/detective-based themes and having minimal violence. Dhruva went on to become one of the most loved characters in Indian comics as evident by unofficial online polls on various fan sites. The character's fans fondly address him as captain and call themselves his cadets. Anupam Sinha mentioned on his Facebook wall in Feb 2012 referencing to Dhruva's popularity and his debut title, "the first book of my most successful character yet, which I made 25 years ago is still in print and sells! Thank you God for everything!"

In 2013, Raj comics published a list of Top 20 best sellers titles on their official Facebook page based on the sales figures on their own online store and Flipkart. While 6 of them were Dhruva's solo titles, the remaining 14 were multi-hero/crossover titles featuring Dhruva as one of the leading character, thereby making him the most popular Raj comic superhero.

In November 2020, a poll was conducted on the official new Facebook page of 'Raj Comics by Sanjay Gupta'. As an outcome, Dhruva not just secured first place as the most loved Raj Comics character but also the popularity of Dhruva's alone came close to the popularity of all other characters combined.

Although hugely popular in Hindi speaking states of India and the Indians living abroad, the character hardly got any recognition internationally as well as in non-Hindi-speaking regions of South India. In 2009, for the first time, Raj Comics opened stores in Karnataka, one of the non-Hindi speaking states of South India, giving them a taste of Indian Hindi comics. Dhruva has also slowly made his presence felt in the international arena as well. In August 2011, The Boston Globe ran a feature on non-American comic book superheroes. They analysed comic book superheroes belonging to seven different nationalities which included Captain Canuck of Canada, Eden Fesi of Australia, Super Inframan of China, Zooman: El Hombre Mosca – a Mexican superhero, Superboy – a French superhero, Jabbar-The Powerful of Saudi Arab and Dhruva representing Indian comics. Not only did the character receive positive reviews from the columnist, but he also rated Dhruva the highest among the seven heroes awarding him a rating of 8 out of 10. Spanish writer Chris Wright summed up the review for Dhruva – "It's hard to find fault with Super Commando Dhruva – he is completely nuts in the best possible way.". In the Bollywood film 'Hum do hamaare do' lead actor Rajkummar Rao's character name 'Dhruv' is inspired by Super Commando Dhruv. A sticker of Super Commando Dhruv and his name is also mentioned in the movie.

== See also ==
Alternative versions of Dhruva
