= List of Indian comics =

This is a list of Indian comics.

Title	Publication	Publishers	Website
A Bag of Gold Coins	1977	Amar Chitra Katha	
Abhimanyu	1972	Amar Chitra Katha	
Adi Shankara	1974	Amar Chitra Katha	
Agastya	1974	Amar Chitra Katha	
Agniputra Abhay		Diamond Comics	
Ahilyabai Holkar	1975	Amar Chitra Katha	
Ajatashatru	1988	Amar Chitra Katha	
Akbar	1979	Amar Chitra Katha	
Albert Einstein	1983	Amar Chitra Katha	
Amar Singh Rathor	1978	Amar Chitra Katha	
Amba	2013	Amar Chitra Katha	
Amrapali and Upagupta	1978	Amar Chitra Katha	
An Exciting Find	1990	Amar Chitra Katha	
Ananda Math	1975	Amar Chitra Katha	
Anant Pai	2012	Amar Chitra Katha	
Ancestors of Rama	1977	Amar Chitra Katha	
Andhaka	1984	Amar Chitra Katha	
Andher Nagari	1982	Amar Chitra Katha	
Angulimala	1978	Amar Chitra Katha	
Aniruddha	1974	Amar Chitra Katha	
Annapati Suyya	1984	Amar Chitra Katha	
Aruni and Uttanka	1979	Amar Chitra Katha	
Ashoka	1973	Amar Chitra Katha	
Ashwins to the Rescue	1984	Amar Chitra Katha	
Ayyappan	1975	Amar Chitra Katha	
Babasaheb Ambedkar	1979	Amar Chitra Katha	
Babur	1977	Amar Chitra Katha	
Bagha Jatin	1978	Amar Chitra Katha	
Bahadur		Indrajal Comics	
Bahman Shah	1981	Amar Chitra Katha	
Bahubali	1981	Amar Chitra Katha	
Baji Rao I	1974	Amar Chitra Katha	
Baladitya & Yashodharma	1980	Amar Chitra Katha	
Balban	1981	Amar Chitra Katha	
Banda Bahadur	1973	Amar Chitra Katha	
Bappa Rawal	1975	Amar Chitra Katha	
Basaveshwara	1980	Amar Chitra Katha	
Batu Gaiden		Level 10 Comics	
Battle of Wits	1985	Amar Chitra Katha	
Beni Madho & Pir Ali	1983	Amar Chitra Katha	
Bhagat Singh	1981	Amar Chitra Katha	
Bhagawat Purana 1: Krishna - The Darling of Gokul	1989	Amar Chitra Katha	
Bhagawat Purana 2: Krishna - The Subduer of Kaliya	1989	Amar Chitra Katha	
Bhagawat Purana 3: Krishna - The Upholder of Govardhan	1989	Amar Chitra Katha	
Bhagawat Purana 4: Krishna - Victory over Kamsa	1989	Amar Chitra Katha	
Bhagawat Purana 5: Krishna - The Lord of Dwaraka	1990	Amar Chitra Katha	
Bhagawat Purana 6: Krishna - The Enchanter	1990	Amar Chitra Katha	
Bhagawat Purana 7: Krishna - The Victorious	1990	Amar Chitra Katha	
Bhagawat Purana 8: Krishna - An Ally of the Pandavas	1990	Amar Chitra Katha	
Bhagawat Purana 9: Krishna - The Saviour	1990	Amar Chitra Katha	
Bhanumati	1977	Amar Chitra Katha	
Bheema & Hanuman	1980	Amar Chitra Katha	
Bheeshma	1972	Amar Chitra Katha	
Bidhi Chand	1981	Amar Chitra Katha	
Bikal the Terrible	1983	Amar Chitra Katha	
Billoo		Diamond Comics	
Bimbisara	1983	Amar Chitra Katha	
Birbal the Clever	1980	Amar Chitra Katha	
Birbal the Genius	1985	Amar Chitra Katha	
Birbal the Inimitable	1989	Amar Chitra Katha	
Birbal the Just	1975	Amar Chitra Katha	
Birbal the Wise	1977	Amar Chitra Katha	
Birbal the Witty	1978	Amar Chitra Katha	
Birbal to the Rescue	1980	Amar Chitra Katha	
Brown Paperbag	2016	WEBTOON	
Buddha	1971	Amar Chitra Katha	
Chacha Chaudhary		Diamond Comics	
Chaitanya Mahaprabhu	1975	Amar Chitra Katha	
Chanakya	1971	Amar Chitra Katha	
Chand Bibi	1974	Amar Chitra Katha	
Chandra Shekhar Azad	1977	Amar Chitra Katha	
Chandragupta Maurya	1978	Amar Chitra Katha	
Chandrahasa	1976	Amar Chitra Katha	
Chandralalat	1979	Amar Chitra Katha	
Chandrapeeda	1984	Amar Chitra Katha	
Chennamma of Keladi	1988	Amar Chitra Katha	
Chhatrasal	1973	Amar Chitra Katha	
Chokha Mela	1983	Amar Chitra Katha	
Daksh		Level 10 Comics	
Damaji Pant and Narhari	1983	Amar Chitra Katha	
Dara Shukoh & Aurangzeb	1981	Amar Chitra Katha	
Dasharatha	1976	Amar Chitra Katha	
Dayananda	1977	Amar Chitra Katha	
Deshbandhu Chittaranjan Das	1985	Amar Chitra Katha	
Devi	2006 - 2008	Liquid Comics	
Devi Chaudhurani		Yali Dream Creations	
Devi Choudhurani	1977	Amar Chitra Katha	
Dhola & Maru	1984	Amar Chitra Katha	
Dhruva & Ashtavakra	1976	Amar Chitra Katha	
Doga	1992	Raj Comics	
Dr. Kotnis in China	1984	Amar Chitra Katha	
Draupadi	1974	Amar Chitra Katha	
Drona	1974	Amar Chitra Katha	
Durgadas	1974	Amar Chitra Katha	
Durgesh Nandini	1983	Amar Chitra Katha	
Dynamite		Diamond Comics	
Echamma the Brave	1982	Amar Chitra Katha	
Ekanath	1977	Amar Chitra Katha	
Elephanta	1977	Amar Chitra Katha	
Ellora Caves	1988	Amar Chitra Katha	
Fa Hien	1987	Amar Chitra Katha	
Friends & Foes - Animal Tales from the Mahabharata	1981	Amar Chitra Katha	
Gandhari	1980	Amar Chitra Katha	
Ganesha And The Moon	2011	Amar Chitra Katha	
Ganesha	1975	Amar Chitra Katha	
Ganga	1975	Amar Chitra Katha	
Garuda	1977	Amar Chitra Katha	
Ghanshyam Das Birla	1987	Amar Chitra Katha	
Ghatotkacha	1974	Amar Chitra Katha	
Gopal & the Cowherd	1979	Amar Chitra Katha	
Gopal the Jester	1981	Amar Chitra Katha	
Guru Arjan	1983	Amar Chitra Katha	
Guru Gobind Singh	1972	Amar Chitra Katha	
Guru Har Gobind	1978	Amar Chitra Katha	
Guru Nanak	1973	Amar Chitra Katha	
Guru Ravidas	1986	Amar Chitra Katha	
Guru Tegh Bahadur	1976	Amar Chitra Katha	
Hakka & Bukka	1981	Amar Chitra Katha	
Indra & Shachi	1974	Amar Chitra Katha	
InkLab Zine	2013	InkLab Zine	
Jagadish Chandra Bose	1985	Amar Chitra Katha	
Kabir	1974	Amar Chitra Katha	
Lachit Barphukan	1978	Amar Chitra Katha	
M S Subbulakshmi	2012	Amar Chitra Katha	
Mahabali Shaka		Diamond Comics	
Nachiketa	1979	Amar Chitra Katha	
Odayan: Aarambham	2012	Level 10 Comics	
Odayan: Yuddham	2014	Nihodo Media	
Pinki		Diamond Comics	
Quick Vision		Infinito Comics	
Ramayan 3392 A.D.		Liquid Comics	
Shaurya		Level 10 Comics	
Spider-Man: India		Gotham Entertainment Group	
Super Commando Dhruva	1987	Raj Comics	
Tauji		Diamond Comics	
The Sadhu		Liquid Comics	
Tinkle	1980	India Book House	
Udayana	1977	Amar Chitra Katha	
Vaishno Devi	2011	Amar Chitra Katha	
Yayati	1978	Amar Chitra Katha	
Zarathushtra	1974	Amar Chitra Katha	

== See also ==
- Magazine
- Media of India

Lists

- List of newspapers in India
- List of radio stations in India
- List of Indian TV channels
- List of Indian films
