= Indian comics =

Comics Book publishers of India

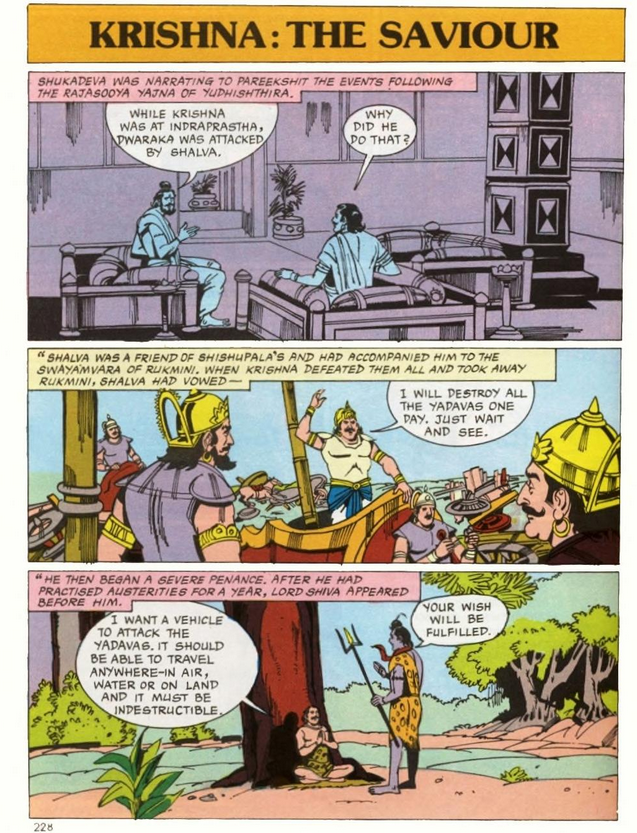
- Excerpt from "Krishna The Savior" by Amar Chitra Katha
- Series: List of Indian comics
- Languages: English, Hindi, Tamil, Bengali

Chitrakatha (lit: Picture Story) or Indian comics are comics or graphic novels originating from India published in a number of Indian languages.

India has a long tradition of comic readership and themes associated with extensive mythologies and folk-tales have appeared as children's comic books for decades. Indian comics often have large publication. The comic industry was at its peak in the late 1980s and early 1990s and during this period popular comics were easily sold more than 500,000 copies over the course of its shelf life of several weeks. Currently, it only sells around 50,000 copies over a similar period. India's once-flourishing comic industry is in sharp decline because of increasing competition from satellite television (children's television channels) and the gaming industry.

Over the last six decades Diamond Comics, Raj Comics, Tinkle, Balarama and Amar Chitra Katha have established vast distribution networks countrywide and are read by hundreds of thousands of children in a wide range of languages. Famous comic creators from India include Pratap Mulick, Chandu, Harvinder Mannkar, Sukhwant Kalsi, Anupam Sinha, Aabid Surti, Uncle Pai, Ram Waeerkar and cartoonist Pran Kumar Sharma, Neerad and famous characters are Chacha Chaudhary, Bahadur, Meeku, Motu Patlu, Detective Moochhwala, Nagraj, Super Commando Dhruva, Doga, Suppandi and Shikari Shambu and many more . Anant Pai, affectionately known as "Uncle Pai," is credited with helping to launch India's comic book industry in the 1960s with his "Amar Chitra Katha" series chronicling the ancient Hindu mythologies.

== History ==
India's comic industry began in the mid-1960s when the leading newspaper The Times of India launched Indrajal Comics. The industry evolved later in India. Up until the late 1960s the comics were only enjoyed by the children of wealthy parents. But from that time until the early 1990s they established themselves in the market. The evolution of Indian comics can be broadly divided into many phases. Around 1950s saw syndicated strips like The Phantom, Mandrake, Flash Gordon, Rip Kirby being translated to Indian languages. The success of such comic books was followed by a swarm of publishers trying to emulate these titles. The second phase in the late 1960s came in the form of Amar Chitra Katha (literally translated as "immortal picture stories"), comics with hundred percentage Indian content.

The Indian adaptation of Spider-Man, Spider-Man:India, peak example of foreign comics publishers looking at India as potential market.

In the 1970s, several indigenous comics were launched to rival the Western superhero comics. The superhero comics in the early '80s marked the third wave, with creators and publishers hoping to benefit from the success of the superhero genre in the West. However, one of India's earliest superheroes is Batul the Great, was created during the 1960s by Narayan Debnath, whose early comic strip Handa Bhonda had been launched in the magazine Shuktara in 1962.

In the 1980s, at least 5.5 million copies of comics such as Heroes of Faith series were sold in India. Dozens of publishers churned out hundreds of such comic books every month, but this trend nosedived in the late '90s with the advent of cable television, Internet and other modes of entertainment in India. However, publishers like Raj Comics and Diamond Comics, along with comics like Amar Chitra Katha (with characters such as Suppandi) have been able to sustain their readership.

After a hush, new publishing companies such as Level 10 Comics, Chariot Comics, Arkin Comics, Nila Comics, Yali Dream Creations, Cheeseburger Comics, Fiction Comics, Comix Theory, Green Gold, Jr. Diamond, Diamond Books, and Diamond Toons have appeared on the market in the last few years. Comic publishers meanwhile have been accused by critics of lacking innovation in the face of digital competition. Counter to claims, many innovations had been introduced in which Indian publishers have tried many ways to promote comics such as animation, film, television, digital comics, VHS films, audio films, and mobile apps by Raj Comics, Diamond Comics, and Amar Chitra Katha.

A very innovative attempt was made by Indian publishers to reach out to 236 Indian Rajya Sabha members by sending postcards with a request to promote the reading of books and comics by world record holder Niand Jadhav, in conjunction with Indian comics publishers Comix Theory and Comics Byte, along with comics art workshops, massive comics giveaways programs, and the Pulp Gulp Talk Show, which were launched by Comix Theory to promote comics digitally and bring out various topics of discourse in mainstream comics which had not been present before, like philosophy, history, fine art, theatre, and new artists under the exegesis of creative and independent research scholar Shambhu Nath Mahto.

A dedicated news portal, Comics Byte, has covered Indian comics and activities related to them. Recently, VR- and AR-enabled comics were seen as being distinct from the long-exploited 3D comics of the past. TBS Planet Comics released VR comics in which a hidden treasure box can be discovered by holding a smartphone over the pages of comics. West Bengal based Kolkata Comics also published AR-capable comics and translated comics from Bengali to English for viewing on mobile devices.

Webcomics have been a popular medium in India since the early 2000s. Indian webcomics are successful as they reach a large audience for free and they are frequently used by the country's younger generation to spread social awareness on topics such as politics and feminism. These webcomics receive a large amount of exposure by being spread through social media.

There were also publishers solely dedicated to bringing licensed content into the Indian comics market. From around 1997 to 2008, Gotham Comics published Spiderman: India, a version of the character Spider-Man. Dolton Comics, courtesy of Chandamama, had many DC characters published in India in various languages, mainly Superman and Batman were staple products. The publication of licensed characters by Indian comics publishers has a long history, which includes publishers like Amar Chitra Katha, Madhumuskan, Gowersons, Lion Comics, Egmont, Euro Kids, and in recent years after 2020, Regal Comics, Fenil Comics, Shakti Comics, and many more. India hosted its first ever comics convention in February 2011. According to 2012 estimates, the Indian comic publishing industry was worth over 100 million dollars.

Diamond Comics, Manoj Comics, Raj Comics, Diamond Toons, and Tulsi Comics have gained immense readership and fanbases in north India since the 1980s because of their popular characters, like Chacha Chaudhary, Billoo, Pinki, Nagraj, Super Commando Dhruva, Hawaldar Bahadur, Angara, Jamboo and many more. Creators like Anant Pai, Abid Surti, Pran, Pratap Mullick, Enver Ahmed, Anupam Sinha, Manu, Ved Prakash Sharma, Parshuram Sharma, and many more are well known in north Indian comics for creating various comics characters and producing volumes of works during their active period.

From 2005 up to recent times, there have been many attempts by recently ventured and old comics publishers to revive the Indian comics industry, including initiatives from Level 10 Comics, Yali Dream Creations, Cheeseburger Comics, Holycow Entertainment, Chariot Comics, Ayumi Comics, Red Streak Comics, Rovolt Comics, Vimanika Comics, TBS Planet Comics, UFC, Dream Comics, Swapnil Comics, Vaishnavi Comics, Fenil Comics, Dhaansu Productions and the surviving Raj Comics itself. Amar Chitra Katha, Raj Comics, Diamond Comics, and Diamond Toons have ventured into other entertainment media, like feature films, web series, games, and mobile applications since the late 1990s, and have continuously attempted to widen their impact on the comics-reading population.

From last 2 decade, there has been a notable rise in manga and anime as part of global trend. Around 2005 to 2010 many Indian creators, e.g., Jazyl Homavazir and independent comics publishers, e.g., Illustrated Orchid, began releasing manga comics. The popularity of manga and anime in India has led to Japanese manga-inspired comic books, such as Mythology, a comic book based on Hindu mythology that has been released in India, Singapore, Malaysia and Europe. Batu Gaiden is a manga fantasy series which incorporates cricket into mythology. In more recent years from 2020 and afterwards, Cosmics (with published titles Nirvana, Soul Contract and Whispers of Void), Qissa Comics (with their published titles The Worlds Beyond, Six Paths, and PowerPlay). bullseye, Zodiac (with published titles Yudhishter) is following the way and bringing their new contents base on varied themes of Indian mythos and epics, modern age themes, and global trends for their audiences. Apart from this, there are also some big giant publisher and companies who are grabbing the manga and anime trend, e.g., Pratilipi and Toonsutra of Graphic India, who are exploiting AI in full-scale for creating their contents.

== Indian comics publishers ==
- Aan Comics
- Amar Chitra Katha
- Ajay Comics
- Alpha Comics (part of Raj Comics)
- Anand Comics
- Bal Bharti (Kids Magazine)
- Balabhumi (Kids Magazine)
- Balamangalam (Kids Magazine)
- Balarama (Kids Magazine)
- Besra Comics
- Bittu Comics
- Bullseye Comics
- Campfire Comics
- Cartoon Plus (Kids Magazine)
- Champak (Kids Magazine)
- Chandamama (Kids Magazine)
- Chetan Comics
- Cheeseburger Comics
- Chitra Bharti Kathamala
- Chitragaatha Comics
- Chhabite Galp Comics
- Chunnu Comics
- Cinemics Comics
- Comix Theory
- Comics Today (Magazine)
- Cosmics Comics (Manga)
- Dhanush Comics
- Diamond Comics
- Divakar Chitrakatha
- Durga Comics
- Eagle Comics
- Fenil Comics
- Fiction Comics
- FlyDreams Comics
- Fort Comics
- Ganga Chitrakatha
- Goel Comics
- Golden Comics
- Gowarsons Comics
- Guneet Comics
- Holy Cow Entertainment
- Indrajal Comics
- Illustrated Orchids
- Jain Chitrakatha
- Kalapani Comics
- Kanwal Comics
- King Comics (part of Raj Comics)
- Kiran Comics
- Kumar Comics
- Kuttikalude Deepika (Kids Magazine)
- Lalu Leela
- Level 10 Comics
- Lion Comics
- Lotpot
- Madhu Muskan Comics
- Manoj Comics (later occupied by Raj Comics)
- Manesh Comics
- Meenu Chitrakatha
- Nandan (Kids Magazine)
- Nanhe Samraat (Kids Magazine)
- Neelam Comics
- Nutan Comics
- Orange Radius Comics
- Pawan Comics
- Pitara Comics
- Pinwheel Comics
- Prabhat Comics
- Prampra Comics
- Qissa Comics
- Radha Comics
- Radiant Comics
- Rakesh Comics
- Raj Comics
- Rani Comics
- Regal publishers
- Rig Sindhu Comics
- Roshni Comics
- Sadhna Comics
- Shakti Comics
- Star Comics IBH
- Suman Comics
- Swapnil Comics
- Swayambhu Comics
- TBS Planet
- Tinkle (Kids Magazine)
- Trishul Comics
- Tulsi Comics (later occupied by Raj Comics)
- UFC Comics
- Veva Chitrakatha
- Vimanika Comics
- Vinmics Comics
- Vivek Comics
- Yali Dream Creations
- Yomics World
- Zodiac

== Notable creators ==
- Abid Surti
- Anant Pai
- Anupam Sinha
- Dheeraj Verma
- Manoj Gupta
- Narayan Debnath
- Pran Kumar Sharma
- Pratap Mullick
- Sanjay Gupta
- Lalit Kumar Sharma
- Tadam Gyadu
- Saahil S Sharma
- Harsho Mohan Chattoraj
- Dildeep Singh
- Alok Sharma
- Shamik Dasgupta
- Appupen
- Sarnath Banerjee
- Orijit Sen
- Joshi Benedict
- Amruta Patil
- Sumit Kumar (Bakarmax)

== Annual events ==
- Comic Con India
- Comics Fest India
- New Delhi World Book Fair
- Indie Comix Fest

== See also ==
- Magazine
- Media of India
- ComixCanal

Lists

- List of Indian comics
- List of newspapers in India
- List of radio stations in India
- List of Indian TV channels
- List of Indian films

== Bibliography ==
- Dastidar, D. Ghosh. “Prospects of Comic Studies in India,” Gnosis 3 (2019), 113–128.
- Hawley, John Stratton. 'The Saints Subdued: Domestic Virtue and National Integration in Amar Chitra Katha' in Media and the Transformation of Religion in South Asia, eds. Lawrence A Babb, Susan S. Wadley, Motilal Banarasidas, 1998.
- MacLain, Karline. India's Immortal Comic Books: Gods, Kings, and Other Heroes, Indiana University Press, 2009. ISBN 978-0-253-22052-3.
- Pritchett, Frances W. 'The World of Amar Chitra Katha' in Media and the Transformation of Religion in South Asia, eds. Lawrence A Babb, Susan S. Wadley, Motilal Banarasidas, 1998.
- Lent, John A., Comic Art of Africa, Asia, Australia, and Latin America Through 2000: An International Bibliography, Greenwood Publishing Group, 2004.
