= Mapui =

Publication information
- Publisher: ACK Media
- First appearance: November 2015
- First comic appearance: Tinkle
- Created by: Sean D′mello and Vineet Nair

In-story information
- Full name: Mapui Kawlim
- Notable aliases: Wingstar
- Abilities: Super flight and super strength

Mapui Kawlim (alias Wingstar) is a superhero appearing in the Indian comic book Tinkle. It was created by Sean D'mello and artist Vineet Nair. It made its debut on the 35th anniversary issue of the comic book, issue number 639 released in November 2015. It is the first superhero from Mizoram, and the first female superhero from northeast India in the series of Tinkle. According to D'mello, the purpose was to "create awareness about the Northeast [northeast India]." The name "Mapui" is a popular pet name among the Mizo people. The character originates from Aizawl, the capital city of Mizoram. She acquires super flight and super strength from gadgets developed by her inventor-father.

The editor Rajani Thindiath described it as a "reluctant superhero" but "has the potential to be the most iconic female superhero characters in Indian comic history." It was created to promote gender equality with a focus on northeast India where discrimination based on ethnic stereotyping has been an issue. But it was criticised for not reflecting any of the northeast Indian cultural elements and environments.

== Character ==
Mapui is a 13-year-old girl from a middle-class family living in Aizawl. She is a naturally reluctant girl and preferring to play cricket than being a superhero. She is a regular school girl, but would try to avoid home works, and particularly averse to doing mathematics. She would rather go for sleepovers. Her father, Tashi Kawlim, is an inventor working for the Space Development Arm of the government. Her gadgets, including a secret superhero boost are developed by her father, Tashi Kawlim. She became a superhero after testing the gadget inventions of her father.

Mapui's gadgets are rocket thrusters that can make a speed of 110 km per hour, iron fists that can break brick walls, and reinforced robotic arms that can lift a ton of weight. Wearing a white and green suit, she fights criminals at night as her alias Wingstar. The signals of criminal activity are indicated by a special wristwatch, which allows her to receive notification at the same time as the police.

== Purpose ==
The Tinkle has successful and regular characters such as Shikari Shambhu, Suppandi and Kalia the Crow. But they are becoming old-fashioned strips. It tries to include characters hanging innovative technology. Introduction of two female superheroes, SuperWeirdos and PsyMage, were not a success. The CatchNews reported that one of the objectives of introducing this superhero is to mend the feeling of prejudices among the people in northeast India. There are opinions in the mainland India that northeast India is more closely allied to China than to India. This has resulted in outcries of racial stereotyping and discrimination. The prejudices also turned to occasional violence, and northeasterners are the major victims. There are rape incidences of northeast Indian girls in other parts of India.

In a comment, editor Rajni Thindiath added another objective, saying, "We need more iconic female heroes to join the plethora of enduring male comic characters in the country – Suppandi, Shikari Shambu and Tantri the Mantri. Over half of the children in our country are female after all."

=== Criticism ===
The character of Mapui Kawlim was introduced as a Mizo girl from Aizawl, with an aim to break stereotyping in northeast India. However, it has no features of Mizo culture, the region it represents or any profile of the northeast people. As Sukruti Anah Staneley of The Caravan argues, no elements of Mizo culture or the state are presented, as she said, "Even though the comic’s characters and its story are based in Mizoram, it did not appear to weave Mizo culture into the narrative or the visual language. Opportunities to include such elements were many, but Mapui's world did not contain any recognisable traces of her ethnicity." Cultural inaccuracies have been pointed out: Mapui is a misnomer of common Mizo name "Mapuii"; Kawlim is not a surname in Mizo or other northeastern people; and the father's name Tashi is also a non-northeast India name, but of Tibetans or Buddhists.

Contradicting the original claim that character is about Mizoram and ethnic prejudices against the northeast Indians, Thindiath denied this to the BBC News, "I am aware of the discrimination, but we didn't create WingStar because of that. At Tinkle, we believe in plurality. We strive to represent the whole country and this character is an extension of that strategy." To The Hindu, Thindiath had stated the success of the series as: "There was a lot of acceptance for Mapui Kawlim. She was from Mizoram and a lot of kids from northeast identified with it." Thindiath also mentioned that the name was specifically that of a Mizo. D'mello asserted that they have no particular focus on any ethnicity, although they initially explained that the material or colour representative of "Mizoram (since it is where the story is set) is taken into account." It was revealed that the creators had never experienced Mizoram or studied deeply the Mizo cultural backgrounds. Staneley remarked: "The attempt at pluralism is noteworthy, and while we appreciate the effort, a little more research at the ground-level could have seriously helped in fashioning a character true to the diversity of a highly-neglected section of Indian society."
