= Sons of Ram =

- Directed by: Kushal Ruia
- Written by: Kushal Ruia
- Based on: The Sons of Rama by: Anant Pai; Ram Waeerkar
- Produced by: Kushal Ruia; Jonathan Dotan; Vijay Sampath, Vishnu Athreya, and Silas Hickey (executive producers)
- Starring: Sunidhi Chauhan; Aditya Kapadia; Devansh Doshi; Saptrishi Ghosh
- Music by: Songs: Gaurav Issar, Shailesh Rao, and Asif Ali Beg; Scores: Gaurav Issar and Shailesh Rao
- Production companies: ACK Animation Studios; Maya Digital Studios; Cartoon Network India
- Distributed by: DAR Media Pvt. Ltd. (India); Maya Digital Studios (International)
- Release date: 2 November 2012
- Country: India
- Languages: Hindi; English

Sons of Ram is a 2012 Indian animated film created by ACK Animation Studios, and co-produced by Maya Digital Studios and Cartoon Network India. Based on Hindu mythology, it depicts the sons of Rama, Luv and Kush. It is Amar Chitra Katha's first animated feature film in stereoscopic 3D. It was released to theatres in India on 2 November 2012.

The film was screened at the Toronto Animation Arts festival (TAAFI) in 2013.

== Plot ==
Surayavanshi Ram of Ayodhya, the greatest warrior king that ever lived and the main character of the Ramayana, was forced to send his beloved wife Sita into exile, thus leading him and his kingdom to despair and towards an empty future.

Unknown to Ram, far away in Sage Valmiki's hermitage, Sita lives as Vandevi, raising their twin sons, Luv and Kush. Though not aware of their lineage, the twins imbibe wisdom, compassion, and combat skills that would put any royal prince to shame.

Sita teaches Luv -Kush to always work as a team, secretly hoping that her estranged family would find a way to come together one day. The twins must conquer their inner demons before they can achieve their destinies.

Accompanied by friends, Luv-Kush's journey takes them to Ayodhya, the home of their fabled heroes.

== Voice cast ==
- Aditya Kapadia - Luv
- Devansh Doshi - Kush
- Saptrishi Ghosh -Rama
- Sunidhi Chauhan - Sita
- Raj Bhuva - Bheelu
- Ettienne Couthino - Valmiki
- Sanjeev Vrika - Lakshmana
- Damandeep Singh Baggan as Shatrughna
- Chetan Sharma as Hanuman and Vishvamitra

== Reception ==
Taran Adarsh of Bollywood Hungama gave the film two out of five, writing, "On the whole, SONS OF RAM has a great story to tell, but lacks the epic feel that one associates with mythology."

== See also ==
- List of Indian animated feature films
