= Radha Comics =

Radha Comics was an Indian comics publication in the late 1980s and early 1990s. It was published by Radha Pocket Books, Meerut, India. It was published on a monthly schedule with usually four to six comics in each monthly comic-set. The comics were published in Hindi only.

The most successful series published was Shaktiputra. Shaktiputra is a character similar to RoboCop in appearance and abilities. He is a crime fighter cyborg fitted with the brain of inspector Vikram, who devoted his life to become a Half Robot. His inventor was Prof. Padmanabhan, an eminent scientist of India. His body is made of metal except his face, which too is covered with a helmet. He uses weapons such as a sword, shield, laser revolver and also have a special power in his helmet.

The following are other Radha Comics characters:

- Bauna Jasoos
- Judo Queen Radha
- Mahakaal
- Rudraal
- Janbaaz Jwala
- Chacha Chaubey
- Naagesh
- Iron Man
- Raja Jaani
- Fantoosh
