= Level 10 =

Level 10 may refer to:

- Level 10 in English football league system (section Promotion and relegation rules for the top eight levels)
- Level 10 (USA Gymnastics), highest level in the USA Gymnastics Junior Olympics Program
- Level10 Comics, a comic book comic publishing company based out of Mumbai, India
- Level 10 (band), a heavy metal supergroup with Russell Allen as lead singer.
