= Kalia the Crow =

Kalia

Publication information
- Publisher: Amar Chitra Katha / ACK Media
- First appearance: Tinkle No. 1, December 1980
- Created by: Luis Fernandes, Pradeep Sathe

In-story information
- Abilities: intelligence, social abilities

Kalia the Crow is a character in the Indian monthly comic Tinkle. Kalia is a crow who regularly stops Chamataka the jackal and Doob Doob the crocodile from eating his friends.

== History ==
Kalia the Crow made his first appearance in comic format in December 1980, in the first issue of Tinkle. Luis Fernandes, a former editor of Tinkle magazine, and an integral member of the Tinkle creative team, was the creator of Kalia. The first artist was Pradeep Sathe who believed that cartoonish elements, when added to an animal, should not result in a distortion of the animal's anatomy. Sathe was succeeded as the artist by Prasad Iyer, C.D. Rane and Juee Rane.

== Characters ==
Kalia the crow, who always manages to save his friends from trouble, is very alert and observant. Using his schemes, he manages to save various animals from being eaten by Chamataka and Doob Doob.

Chamataka is a jackal that usually features as the main villain, assisted by Doob Doob the crocodile. Most plots feature the two trying to catch prey, and coming up with a variety of schemes to do so. The prey, however, are always saved by Kalia, making him Chamataka and Doob Doob's archenemy. Kalia has also saved his life on some occasions, though.

Doob Doob the crocodile is a friend of Chamataka, and is somewhat dimwitted. He usually dislikes Kalia but is more inclined than Chamataka to be amicable with him. Kalia has additionally saved his life on some occasions. He often has his own dreams, such as a desire to fly.

Keechu and Meechu are two rabbits that get frequently targeted for food by Chamataka and Doob Doob.

Shonar is a spotted deer who is often chased for food by Chamataka and Doob Doob.

Babloo is a bear who hates Chamataka for frequently stealing his honeycombs. Chamataka, in turn, is afraid of Babloo, and Kalia exploits this to save others from the jackal.

Additional supporting characters are Lubdubi the crocodile, Sayal the porcupine, Sundar the peacock, Sundari the peahen, Brother Elephant and an unnamed bison. There are also one-shot characters who may be jungle fauna, pets, livestock or escapees from zoos and circuses.

== See also ==
- Indian comics
- Tinkle
