= Tinkle =

Indian magazine and comic

- The first issue of Tinkle in 1980
- Editor: Anant Pai (1980 - 2010); Rajani Thindiath (2010 - 2020); Kuriakose Saju Vaisian (2020 - 2023); Gayathri Chandrasekaran (2023 - present)
- Categories: Comic book
- Frequency: Printed Weekly
- First issue: November 1980
- Company: Tinkle
- Country: India
- Language: English, Hindi, Malayalam, Assamese
- Website: tinkle.in

Tinkle is an Indian weekly magazine for children in English, published from Mumbai. Originally owned by the India Book House, the Tinkle brand was acquired by ACK (Amar Chitra Katha) Media in 2007. The magazine contains comics, stories, puzzles, quizzes, contests and other features targeted at school children, although its readership includes many adults as well. It is published in English and syndicated in many Indian languages like Hindi, Bengali, and Malayalam.

The magazine was published at a monthly frequency until July 2016 when Tinkle announced its first fortnightly issue. Currently, from June 2020 it has been published weekly.

The first issue of Tinkle was released in November 1980. The magazine carries comics, stories, and regular columns of interest to school children. Tinkle enjoys great popularity in India — as of 2019, Tinkle had a circulation of 3 lakh copies per issue. It has been an integral part of growing up in India in the last two decades and characters like Suppandi and Shikari Shambu that were created in the early years of the magazine have nationwide recognition among all age groups. Readers send more than 200 letters with stories and other features to be considered for printing in the magazine. The wholesome combination of education and entertainment that defines Tinkle has many celebrity fans in India, including the former Prime Minister of India, Atal Bihari Vajpayee. The official website of Tinkle contains puzzles and games.

== Background ==
Anant Pai, the founding editor of the magazine, is known to his readers as Uncle Pai. The idea behind starting a comic book series devoted to Indian culture and history came to Pai from a quiz contest aired on Doordarshan in February 1967, in which participants could easily answer questions pertaining to Greek mythology, but were unable to reply to the question "In the Ramayana, who was Rama's mother?"

Pai left his job at Times of India, and started ACK (Amar Chitra Katha) the same year, with the help of late G.L. Mirchandani of IBH, (who also took charge as the command of Tinkle late when it was formed), when most other publishers had rejected the concept. Later, he took on the role of writer, editor, and publisher. The series went on to become a publishing milestone for the Indian comic book scene, selling over 90 million copies of about 440 titles (as per the last count until the end of 2008). He has also launched the popular series.

In June 2018, Tinkle Comics reprinted the Original Series in three volumes, with Tinkle stories and features from issues #1 to #18, originally published between December 1980 and April 1982.

Rajani Thindiath took over as editor-in-chief in 2010 and ran the magazine for a decade before moving on from the role in January 2021. During her tenure as editor, she created two brand-new series for Tinkle. The first was SuperWeirdos, a series about a set of teenagers with super-weird powers, The series encouraged readers to embrace their uniqueness. The second series she created was YogYodhas, centered on two siblings, Bir and Bala, who are the latest in a long line of yogic warriors who can manifest spirit creatures called praanis. These praanis come to their aid in the YogYodhas' fight against evil. Rajani was also responsible for opening up different genres within Tinkle; she launched Tinkle superheroes like WingStar and the aforementioned SuperWeirdos, introduced horror comedy for the first time in the form of Billy the Vampire (and later, Buchki and the Booligans), and created space for a boarding school series as well called NOIS!

== Recurring features ==
Apart from one-off stories, Tinkle also has recurring characters whose stories have been compiled into trade paperbacks.

- Kalia the Crow: A crow defends his friends from predators and occasional outside threats.
- Big Baan: A forest was moved by an earthquake into another forest and Chamataka and Doob Doob (from Kalia the Crow) are having a tough time adjusting to their new neighbours. There is Pu'rani, a self-declared queen of the forest and Nagaraj, the current king and Krodh, the former king. (Creator: Luis Fernandes; Artists: Archana Amberkar [current], C.D. Rane, Prasad Iyer, Pradeep Sathe, Ram Waeerkar, Ashok Dongre, Ramanand Bhagat)
- Defective Detectives: Consists of two friends, Rahul and Ravi, who are notorious for being wannabe detectives but unable to get even the simplest cases right, with the former's sister Samhita always proving to be better than the duo. (Artist: Abhijeet Kini)
- SuperWeirdos: A girl named Aisha is always trying to find her superpowers. While she searches for her powers, she stumbles on other kids of her age who have amazing but weird powers. Aisha jingles when there is a person with superpower nearby and is immune to many superpowers. Superweirdos was stopped in 2019, but due to popular demand has been brought back. (Original Creator: Rajani Thindiath; Artist: Abhijeet Kini)
- Mapui Kawlim a.k.a. Wingstar: A 13-year-old superhero girl from Aizawl, Mizoram. Her father, an inventor, made her rocket thrusters, iron fists, and reinforced robotic arms, with which she acquires super flight and super strength. (Creator: Sean D′mello; Co-creator Artist: Vineet Nair)
- YogYodhas: Two Twins named Bir and Bala find birthmarks on their bodies that turn into animals (carcals, sharks, scorpions, unicorns, fireflies, and a giant eagle). These animals are called Praanis and can be invoked using Yoga poses
- NOIS: An Enid Blyton-inspired saga of boarding school adventures set at the Nilgiri Orchid International School, centered around fifth-graders Nadia (an overachiever who wants to get out of her sister's shadow) and Aadi (an over-imaginative young boy who dreams of being an actor).
- Suppandi: A young village simpleton whose stupidity, which leads to him frequently changing jobs, is a source of humor. (Artists: Archana Amberkar [current], Sanjiv Waeerkar, Ram Waeerkar). Initially created in 1983.
- Shikari Shambu: A cowardly but well-renowned hunter whose fame stems from heroic deeds that he accomplished by accident, often involving wild animals. (Creator: Subba Rao; Artists: Savio Mascarenhas [current], Vasant Halbe)
- Tantri the Mantri: A jealous minister, Tantri, tries to dethrone a king, Hooja, with various clever plans. The kind and naive king never suspects his minister of any murderous intentions and even trusts him to the point of considering him a friend, as said schemes often backfire on Tantri and sometimes unintentionally save Hooja from outside threats. Every episode sees Tantri hatching an elaborate and seemingly foolproof plan to eliminate Hooja, but the tables get turned by either bad luck or outside sabotage. In issue 712, a bomb was thrown at Hooja's palanquin and he was presumed to have been killed. Tantri was crowned king in issue 714, but his kingship ended in issue 730 when Hooja was revealed to be alive. Tantri is then relegated to being a minister, and he resumes trying to usurp the throne. (Artists: Prachi Killekar, Savio Mascarenhas, Anand Mande, Asit, Seema Mande, Ramanand Bhagat, Ajit Vasaikar, Ashok Dongre, Vineet Nair [current])
- Ina, Mina, Mynah, Mo: Four sisters who enjoy adventures and asking for new items. Their father, Jagganath, is a miser and is hence frustrated by their requests, while their mother, Bina, tries to be the voice of reason. (Creator:; Artists: Vasant Halbe)
- Dental Diaries: The de-fanged vampire Billy Drain goes on multiple quests to obtain a new pair of fangs, constantly supported and smothered by his overbearing mother Grilda, though they are thwarted at every step by the ambitious Myra Vamptop, who is both Billy's nemesis and object of desire.
- Buchki and the Booligans: An 8-year-old girl named Buchki, along with her brother named Cyrus, encounters ghosts while staying with their grandmother, Didu, while their parents are in Japan. They befriend their great-great-grandfather's ghost.
- Wai Knot: A kid from Bengaluru whose motto in life is "don't ask why, ask why not?". Brash, unapologetic, and most of all incredibly strong-minded, Wai Knot always challenges those around him, be it his dad or his best friend Kia, and often gets into trouble with his 'experiments'.
- Pyarelal: A kind villager who lives in Hastipur with his wife Lajwanti. He's ready to help or find solutions to any problem. He is a big fan of the Circus and Gajjo Bajjo Sandow, the powerful wrestler. (Creator: Indira Ananthakrishnan; Artists: Archana Amberkar, Ram Waeerkar, Sanjiv Waeerkar)
- Nasruddin Hodja: Hodja is a witty man from Turkey. His rivals always try to humiliate him, but Hodja turns the tables on them through his intelligence. (Artists: Ram Waeerkar, Sanjiv Waeerkar).
- Mopes and Purr: A detective cat-and-dog duo who is always on the run, solving cases. (Creator: Reena I Puri; Artist: Savio Mascarenhas)
- Butterfingers: A clumsy boy named Amar who is chidingly called "Butterfingers" by his parents, friends and teachers. He is chided for his sloppiness and laziness but is a happy-go-lucky character who also has a presence of mind and manages to save the day despite messing up trivial stuff. The comic, however, was stopped in 2014. (Creator: Khyrunissa A.; Artists: Abhijeet Kini)
- Anwar: A small boy of five who uses his wit and intelligence to get the better of every situation. (Illustrations: Savio Mascarenhas, formerly VB Halbe)
- Raghu: An 8-year-old happy-go-lucky boy, who renders people speechless with his wit. (Illustrations: Savio Mascarenhas, Sanjiv Waeerkar and Ram Waeerkar)
- Ramu and Shamu: They are very similar to Dennis the Menace in nature. These identical twins are about eight years of age and live in a middle-class home with their parents. They always embarrass or confuse their parents with their juvenile and innocent questions or acts. Their episodes are typically only one page long. (Creator: Anant Pai; Artists: Mohandas, Ajit Vasaikar)
- Kapish: This series is similar to Kalia the Crow. Kapish is a monkey who lives in the jungle of Kadu along with his friends Bundila the elephant, Baboocha the bear, Pintu the fawn, Motu the rabbit, Kashapu the tortoise and Panja the eagle. His arch-enemies include Peelu the tiger, Sigal the jackal, Kesha the lion, and Dopaya the hunter. Kapish uses his magic tail, which can be extended, shrunk, and narrowed at will, in order to save his friends from the main antagonists. (Creator: Anant Pai; Artists: Mohandas, Ajit Vasaikar)
- Little Raji: Raji is a young girl who lives in a middle-class home with her parents and elder brother Raju. She is a quick-witted girl who uses her presence of mind to resolve various problems. (Creator: Anant Pai; Artists: Sunita Kalewar)
- Anu Club: Anurag Sharma aka Uncle Anu, is a nuclear physicist who runs the weekly Anu Club, whose members include the neighbourhood kids such as Anand, Amar, Deepa, Vijay as well as the brother-sister duo of Bharat and Chitra. During the club meetings, Uncle Anu explains to the kid's scientific concepts in a practical and fun manner. (Creator: Margie Sastry; Artists: Ramanand Bhagat, Souren Roy, Goutam Sen, Shyam Desai)
- Choru and Joru: Choru, a thief, always has his plans foiled due to the efforts of the police inspector Joru. (Creator: Prasad Iyer; Artists: Anand Mande, Ram Waeerkar)
- The Dumbbells: Nattoo, Dattoo, and Motu are three friends whose antics cause chaos among everyone around them. (Creator: Prasad Iyer; Artists: Anand Mande)
- Mooshik: A three-paneled silent comic of a cat chasing a mouse, reminiscent of Tom and Jerry. (Creator: Subba Rao)

=== Adaptations ===
- Suppandi, Suppandi!: a cartoon series featuring the popular Tinkle toon, Suppandi, features his acts of folly. This show currently airs on Cartoon Network and Pogo.
- Suppandi on YouTube: A series started in 2015, animated videos featuring Suppandi, Shikari Shambu, and the Defective Detectives were released through 2016. Some of them included Coco as part of an advertising campaign with Kellogg's.
- Shambu and the Man Eater: In November 2011, a short animated film featuring the popular Tinkle toon, Shikari Shambu, was released just before the premiere of the animated film of the popular Amar Chitra Katha series, The Sons of Ram. This movie features Shambu's adventures with a man-eating tiger.

=== Trade paperbacks ===
- The Butterfingers Series: A series of three books (as of 21 December 2015) features the clumsy acts of the popular Tinkle character, Amar Kishen aka Butterfingers, written by Khyrunnisa A. The series of three books (Howzaat Butterfingers!, Clean Bowled, Butterfingers!, Goal, Butterfingers!) revolves around Butterfingers and his friends, Eric, Kiran, and Minu, and their funny, comical high school life.
- The Suppandi series: a series of 8 books that have a selection of all the Suppandi tales found in Tinkle.

== See also ==
- Balarama
- Champak
- Diamond Comics
- Indian comics
