= Shikari Shambu =

Indian Comic Character

- Cover Page for Shikari Shambu: Escapades (No. 5)

Publication information
- Publisher: ACK Comics
- First appearance: Tinkle, 1983
- Created by: Vasant B. Halbe; Luis Fernandes

In-story information
- Place of origin: India
- Abilities: Luck and rifle

Shikari Shambu (Hunter Shambu) is an Indian comics character created by Vasant Halbe and Luis Fernandes for the Tinkle magazine in 1983. Shikari Shambu is one of the characters of Tinkle.

Shambu is a cowardly and lazy shikari (hunter) whom the rest of the world perceives as courageous. He always tries to run away from dangerous animals, but due to some stroke of luck always ends up as a hero. He lives with his wife Shanti. In The Legend of Shikari Shambu (Tinkle Magazine No.573), it was revealed that Shambu, before being called "Shikari" Shambu, fell on a tiger and knocked him out. It was after this incident that he got the name "Shikari" Shambu.

He is shown wearing a large pith helmet that completely covers his face and green shorts and a shirt. He carries a large rifle which he usually never uses, never having been shown to have shot or killed an animal.

The character has been adapted for animation and mobile video game adaptations have been released by Nazara Technologies (including Shikari Shambu - The Game and Shikari Shambu Jungle Run).

== Origins ==
By 1988, Tinkle was already on its way becoming the most popular children's magazine in India. Their biggest rival that time was another children magazine named Target, run by Living Media. Unlike Tinkle, Target was more of a narrative magazine, with a few pages of comics. Their flagship character that time was Detective Moochhwala (Hindi for "the man with a mustache") by Ajit Ninan. Moochhwala who was a detective with penetrating eyes and a huge mustache. Tinkle decided to create a competing character. Subba Rao and Dhruva, two of the creators at Tinkle, came up with the proposal for such a character. They decided to base this new character on a boastful but cowardly big game hunter in the then famous television drama, I Love Lucy.

Luis Fernandes then worked on producing the first story, which was originally named "Shambu", before Shahid Hidayat prefixed Shikari (Hindi for "hunter") to the name. Some of his editorial teammates had reservation over the use of the name Shikari, as the wildlife conservation theme was in its prominence. But, the sheer charisma of the name, they and the editor Anant Pai, decided to let it continue. But, contrary to the name, the creators ensured that Shambu never would shoot or kill any animal in any of its episodes. More than that, creators slowly even disassociated him from his trademark hunting gun, after few episodes. The "non-violence" policy of Tinkle also resulted in Shambu being portrayed as more of an explorer than a hunter.

One of the reasons for the popularity of Shikari Shambu, was due to the comical illustrations of the artist, Vasant Halbe. Halbe, who was a freelancer at Tinkle that time, had impressed the editorial team with his earlier works. Once he was confirmed officially as the artist for the series, he showcased his character sketches, of which a drawing of Shikari with his Topi (hat) pulled down over his eyes, caught everyone's attention. The sketch went on to be among the flagship characters of Tinkle. In 1997, Savio A. Mascarenhas replaced Halbe as the illustrator.

== As Little Shambu ==
Later, during the 434th issue of Tinkle, the childhood version of Shambu and also a spin-off of the series, known as Little Shambu appeared. It was a brainwave of Reena Ittyerah Puri, the former Associate Editor of Tinkle and now, Editor, Amar Chitra Katha. The characters of Little Shambu are-

1. Little Shambu- The childhood version of Shikari Shambu.

2. Little Shanti- The childhood version of Shanti, Shambu's Wife.

3. Little J.J.- The childhood version of Jeeva Jeevantak, an old arch-rival of Shambu who wants to harass him.

4. Dum Dum- The pet of Little Shambu, who doesn't appears in the main comic series, Shikari Shambu.

5. Kittu- The pet of Little Shanti. She doesn't appears in Shikari Shambu comic series and always harassed by J.J.

6. Suhasini- She is Little Shambu's mother. Although, her name was not revealed but revealed in a story named Nibble Nibble, which is the 3rd Little Shambu story.

7. Shambu's Father- (The name has not revealed) He is the father of Little Shambu and he always scolded him and even tried to leave him wherever the Shambu household went on such occasions.

The reoccurring characters of Little Shambu are Manu Kaka, Panda Thieves, The teacher, The School Watchman, Prof. Y. Russ, Lakshmi, the Temple Elephant, Kondiah, etc.
