= Khyrunnisa A. =

Indian author

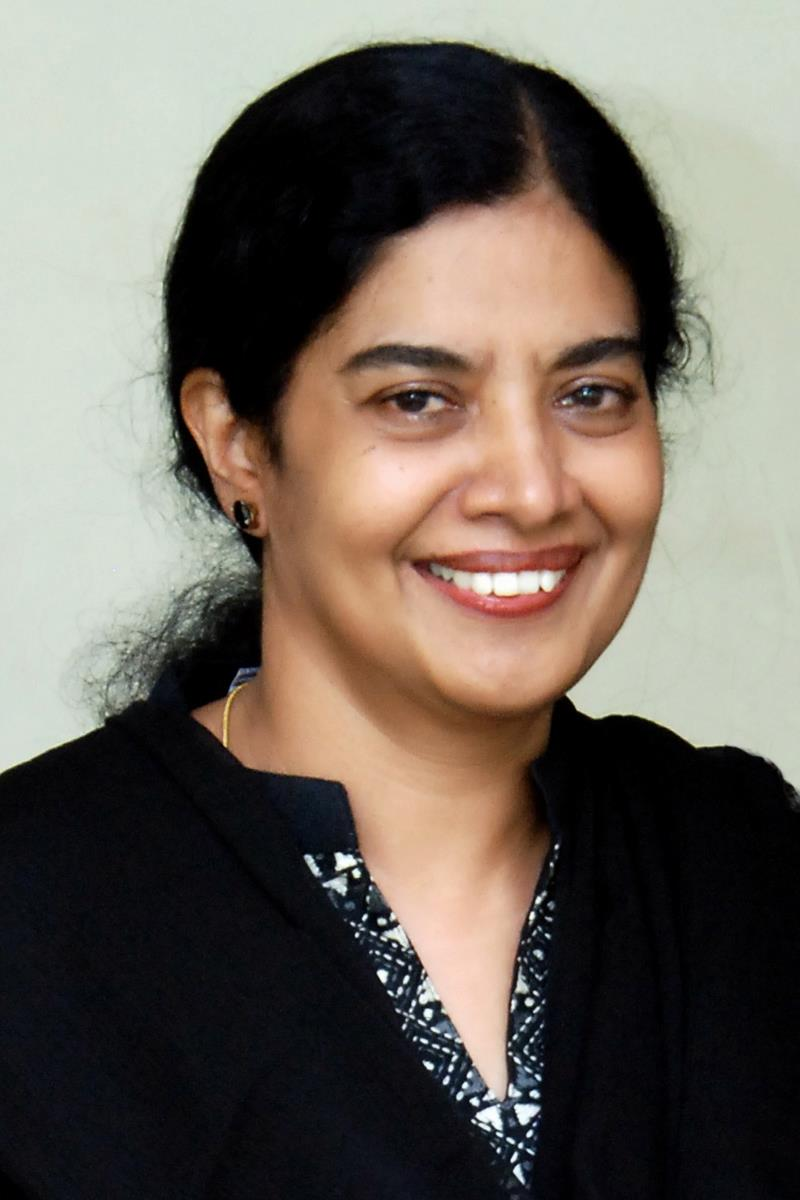
- Khyrunnisa A; Creator & author of the Butterfingers' series.
- Born: Trivandrum, Kerala, India
- Education: University of Kerala
- Writing career
- Genres: Children's literature, Realistic fiction, Humour

Khyrunnisa A. is an Indian author of children's fiction, speaker, academic and columnist who also writes for adults. Humour is her forte. She created the comic book character 'Butterfingers'. The character first appeared in the Indian children's magazine Tinkle. Thirteen-year-old Amar Kishen, aka Butterfingers, now features in the eponymous Butterfingers series of novels and short story collections published by Puffin, the children's imprint of Penguin Random House India. To date, she has twenty books to her credit.

She has written three books for adults: Tongue in Cheek: The Funny Side of Life (2019), Happy Go Funny: The Lighter Moments of Life (2026) – both dealing with the hilarious misadventures of an urban woman – and Chuckle Merry Spin: Us in the U.S (2022), a humorous travelogue based on her trip to the U.S. in 2018. All three books have been published by Westland.

Her book of animal stories for young readers titled The Lizard of Oz and Other Stories, published by Scholastic, appeared in 2019. Another book of animal stories, The Crocodile Who Ate Butter Chicken For Breakfast and Other Stories, was published by Red Panda, the children's imprint of Westland, on 17 August 2020. Shashi Tharoor had this to say about the book, 'Khyrunnisa's oeuvre now has some unique and lovely animal stories giving it the resonance of a Panchatantra for the contemporary world.'

In February 2021, Baby and Dubdub, a warm and funny novella about the relationship between a boy, a dog and a baby, was published by Talking Cub, the children's imprint of Speaking Tiger. The Couch Potato Who Said Ouch and Other Funny Stories, a fun collection of twenty stories, was published by Red Panda, (Westland Books) in January 2024. Around the same time, Ka Kha Ga, a picture book, was published by DC Books, illustrated by Monami Roy. Agassi and the Great Cycle Race, a humorous and appealing novella, was published by Puffin (Penguin Random House) in February 2025. Her second picture book, Where Have All the Vegetables Gone? also published by DC Books, and illustrated by Alina Ifthikar, came out in 2026.

Khyrunnisa's first three children's novels Howzzat Butterfingers! (2010), Goal, Butterfingers! (2012) and Clean Bowled, Butterfingers! (2015), were followed by three collections of short stories, The Misadventures of Butterfingers (2016), Run, It's Butterfingers Again! (2017) and Of Course It’s Butterfingers! (2018). Smash It, Butterfingers! a rollicking badminton-based novel and the seventh in the Butterfingers series, came out in July 2021. All the Butterfingers books were launched by Shashi Tharoor, Member of Parliament.

In 2022, the Malayalam translation of her first novel, Howzzat Butterfingers!, was published by Mathrubhumi Books under the title, Itha Butterfingers! The book was translated by Kaikasi V.S. In 2024, the Malayalam translation of Tongue in Cheek: the Funny Side of Life was published by Mathrubhumi Books under the title Kulchayum Phulkayum... Pinne Nyanum . It was translated by K.T. Rajagopalan.

In May 2023, The World of Butterfingers: Adventure in Texas and Other Stories, a hilarious hundred page comic featuring Butterfingers and illustrated by Abhijeet Kini, was published by Puffin ( Penguin Random House). Another rib-tickling three-in-one hundred page comic titled The World of Butterfingers: The Halloween Adventure and Other Stories also illustrated by Abhijeet Kini and published by Puffin (PRH) came out in June 2025.

A book of her prize-winning stories, Lost in Ooty and Other Adventure Stories, was brought out by Unisun Publications in 2010. Some of her stories for children and for adults have appeared in anthologies published by Puffin, Children's Book Trust, Talking Cub, Red Panda and Unisun Publications. She writes stories regularly for the children's magazine, Dimdima, a Bhavan's publication.

Butterfingers, Khyrunnisa's entry for the Annual All India Tinkle Short story competition for adult writers of children's fiction in 1996, won her the second prize. She went on to win the first prize at the competition for the next seven consecutive years – from 1997 to 2003. In 2007, she won the prestigious Unisun Children's Fiction Award. She also has five Children's Book Trust prizes to her credit.

Smash it, Butterfingers! was short-listed for Sahitya Akademi's Bal Sahitya Puraskar 2024 (English). It was long-listed for the JK Paper and Times of India Auther Awards 2022 in the Children's Literature category and also featured in Times of India's top ten books for children 2021.The Couch Potato Who Said Ouch and Other Funny Stories was longlisted for the Kalinga Literary Festival 2024 Book Awards (Children; English) and shortlisted for the Jury round of the 2025 Delhi Literature Festival 2025 award in the Children's category.

== Personal life ==
Khyrunnisa's parents, A.R. Bijli and Ayesha Bijli, settled down in Trivandrum as her father, a post master, believed that Trivandrum was the best place to provide his eight children, seven of whom were girls, with good education.

She continues to reside in Thiruvananthapuram, Kerala, with her husband P. Vijaya Kumar, a former professor of English and the grandson of Mahakavi Kumaran Asan, who was one of the triumvirate poets of Kerala, a philosopher, a social reformer and a disciple of Sree Narayana Guru. They have one son, Amar Vijaykumar, an engineer, who is married to Arpitha Sridhara. The two are currently working in the USA. Their son Neil was born in Dallas on 20 June 2021.

== Education ==
Khyrunnisa did her schooling in Holy Angel's Convent Trivandrum, and her undergraduate studies in All Saints College and postgraduate as well as M Phil. in University College, Trivandrum. She was awarded the 3rd rank for BA English Literature in Kerala University.

== Career ==
Khyrunnisa worked as associate professor of English at All Saints' College, Thiruvananthapuram. She was appointed Management Trainee in Punjab National Bank and worked there for two years before resigning to take up a teaching job at All Saints' College.

She was a columnist for The New Indian Express, writing on classics and well known works of fiction and for The Hindu where she had a popular fortnightly humour column, Inside View in The Hindu MetroPlus. She has freelanced for publications like Outlook Traveller, Manorama Year Book and Kerala Calling, among others.

== Butterfingers ==
The Butterfinger series revolves around the escapades of thirteen-year-old Amar Kishen, a class VIII student of the fictitious Green Park Higher Secondary School. Amar's slip-grip methods and his clumsy antics earned him the nickname Butterfingers.

Butterfingers, named after Khyrunnisa's son, Amar, first appeared in 2006 in Tinkle, a fortnightly Indian children's magazine, as a regular comic-strip character. The illustrations were by Abhijeet Kini, the Mumbai-based illustrator and graphic artist.

The Butterfingers series, published by Puffin, began with the novel, Howzzat Butterfingers! in 2010. This humorous cricket-based book was followed in 2012 by Goal, Butterfingers!, a football-based adventure novel which also includes an environmental theme. The third in the series, Clean Bowled, Butterfingers! was published in 2015 and is another cricket-based novel with a farcical plot in which Amar and his friends invent a variation of cricket called 'Crack It' when the school's cricket gear gets stolen. This game, played without cricket bats and balls, has its own absurd rules.

The Misadventures of Butterfingers, the fourth book in the series, came out in 2016 and is a collection of short stories. It was followed by two collections of short stories, Run! It's Butterfingers Again! in 2017 and Of Course It's Butterfingers! in 2018. In July 2021, a badminton-based novel, Smash It, Butterfingers! was published.

Howzzat Butterfingers! (2010) was longlisted for the Vodafone Crossword Book Award 2011 in the Children's Books category.

Of Course It’s Butterfingers! (2018) featured as India's most popular children's book in Bookstr.com’s11 Most Popular Children's Books from Around the World on International Children's Book Day 2019.

In 2022, Itha Butterfingers!, the Malayalam translation of Howzzat Butterfingers!, was published by Mathrubhumi Books. The book was translated by Kaikasi V.S.

In 2023, Puffin (Penguin Random House) came out with a hundred-page comic book, titled The World of Butterfingers: Adventure in Texas and Other Stories and illustrated by Abhijeet Kini. It includes three stories featuring Butterfingers. It was followed by another 3-in-1 one hundred page comic book in 2025 titled The World of Butterfingers: The Halloween Adventure and Other Stories, also illustrated by Abhijeet Kini.

The books have received praise from different quarters. Mansur Ali Khan Pataudi, former Indian cricket captain, wrote of Howzzat Butterfingers!: 'What great fun! It brings back memories of my prep school days.' The cricketer V. V. S. Laxman described Clean Bowled Butterfingers as an 'exuberant mix of school, cricket and fun.' Shashi Tharoor, writer, MP and diplomat, complimented Khyrunnisa 'not just for creating Butterfingers, but for enriching Indian writing with world-class children's literature.' He also said that 'Khyrunnisa's Butterfingers is a gift to the children of our nation!'

== Bibliography ==
=== Children's books ===
Butterfingers (Novels)

- Smash It, Butterfingers! (2021)
- Clean Bowled, Butterfingers!(2015)
- Goal, Butterfingers! (2012)
- Howzzat Butterfingers! (2010)

Butterfingers (Collections of Short Stories)

- Of Course It’s Butterfingers! (2018)
- Run, It's Butterfingers Again! (2017)
- The Misadventures of Butterfingers (2016)

Butterfingers (Comics)

- The World of Butterfingers: The Halloween Adventure and Other Stories (2025)
- The World of Butterfingers: Adventure in Texas and Other Stories (2023)

==== Others ====
- Agassi and the Great Cycle Race (2025)
- The Couch Potato Who Said Ouch and Other Funny Stories (2024)
- Baby and Dubdub (2021)
- The Crocodile Who Ate Butter Chicken For Breakfast and Other Stories (2020)
- The Lizard of Oz and Other Stories (2019)
- Lost in Ooty and Other Adventure Stories (2010)

=== Picture Books ===
- Where Have All the Vegetables Gone? (2026)
- Ka Kha Ga (2024)

=== Books for Adults ===
- Happy Go Funny: The Lighter Moments of Life (2026)
- Chuckle Merry Spin: Us in the U.S (2022)
- Tongue in Cheek: The Funny Side of Life (2019)

=== Books in Translation ===
- Kulchayum Phulkayum... Pinne Nyanum (2024) Malayalam translation of Tongue in Cheek:The Funny Side of Life
- Itha Butterfingers! (2022) Malayalam translation of Howzzat Butterfingers!
