= Pramod Pati =

Indian documentary film director (1932–1975)

Pramod Pati (15 January 1932 – 20 January 1975) was an Indian documentary film director and animator.

== Biography ==
Pati was born on 15 January 1932. He graduated from Utkal University and studied cinematography in Bangalore. He worked for the Government of Orissa (now Odisha) from 1952 to 1956. He received a government scholarship to study puppet animation under Jiří Trnka in Prague, Czechoslovakia. When he return to India, he joined the Film Division of Government of India in Bombay (now Mumbai) as the Head of Animation.

He died from cancer on 20 January 1975.

== Works ==
At Film Division, Pati produced and directed several experimental films. He directed the two films on family planning for mass education; Claxplosion (1968) and Six Five Four Three Two (1968). Claxplosion employs the pixilation technique and electronic music to depict an artist's struggle in creating a sculpture. The film ends in the artist crafting a sculpture representing a couple with two children instead of five as in a reference image. In Six Five Four Three Two, Pati adopts a minimalist approach, utilizing a construction site as the setting for mime artists portraying a couple deliberating family planning. The husband proposes six children, but after negotiation, they settle on having two, culminating in a seemingly content couple.

Explorer (1968), a short film, uses avant-garde audiovisual techniques to explore the conflicting duality of urban India in the 1960s, caught between tradition and modernity, war and celebration, and science and religion. Trip (1970) explores movement and time through time-lapse photography in the city of Mumbai. Abid (1972) explores the inner world of the painter Abid Surti who had desire to "live within a painting". In this film using pixilation technique, Surti emerges from the ground, transforms a white room with painted images on walls, ceiling, and floor, akin to creating a live painting.

== Filmography ==
=== Short films ===
- Perspectives (1966)
- Claxplosion (1968)
- Explorer (1968)
- Six Five Four Three Two (1968)
- Trip (1970)
- Abid (1972)
- 90 Films ; Detailed published in the Book , "Pramod Pati; The Adventist Mastercrafter, Edited by Golaka Bihari Singh
