= Manoj Comics =

Manoj Comics was one of the leading comic book houses in India in the 1980s. Many of their comic books were fantasy, but they also published illustrations for like Gulliver's Travels.

Due to changing tastes Manoj Comics were finally closed down. Manoj Comics was the last major Indian comic book company which got shut down just before the end of the dark age of the Indian comic industry. In 2021, Comics India announced that they would start reprinting Manoj Comics starting with character Hawaldar Bahadur.

== Series ==
- Bhoot-Pret Tantra-Mantra
- Bhoot-Pret Tantra-Mantra Jadoo-Tona
- Commando
- Dark Tales
- Dracula
- Jaadui-Vichitra Lok Kathayein
- Thrill Action Adventure

== Important Characters ==
  - Aakrosh
  - Ajgar
  - Akdu Ji - Jhagdu Ji
  - Amar-Akbar
  - Ajay-Vijay-Tingu
  - Anguthelal
  - Aslam
  - Baby
  - Bunty
  - Chacha Paropkari Lal
  - Chatur Chaudhary
  - Colonel Karn
  - Computer Singh
  - Crookbond, a spy similar to James Bond
  - Fomanchu
  - Gangaram Patel
  - Gangaram Talli
  - Hawaldar Bahadur
  - Hawaldar Gaindaram
  - Indra
  - Inspector Manoj
  - Jasoon Patang
  - Jasoos Garamchand
  - Jataayu
  - Jitendra
  - Kaan
  - Kalapret
  - Kallu
  - Kanga
  - Machini Lal - Afeemi Lal
  - Mahabali Bheem
  - Mahabali Shera
  - Mahanayak Kids
  - Makdirani
  - Manku-Jhanku
  - Ram-Rahim
  - Saagar-Salim
  - Shaark
  - Secret Agent Sulemaan
  - Sherbaaz
  - Sherdil
  - Shreeman Funty
  - Sikander
  - Space-Man
  - Super-Thief Rustam
  - Tinni
  - Toofan
  - Topchand Bandookdas
  - Totan
  - Trikaldev
  - Uncle Charlie
  - Vidhvans
  - Vinaash
  - Vinod-Hamid
  - Yugandhar

== See also ==
- Raj Comics
- Diamond Comics
