= Yali Dream Creations =

Indian comics publishing company

Yali Dreem Creations (YDC)
- Founded: 2012; 14 years ago
- Founders: Asvin Srivatsangam; Vivek Rangachari
- Country of origin: United States, India
- Headquarters location: Mumbai, India and San Jose, California
- Publication types: Comics
- Fiction genres: Action; Horror; Adventure; Fantasy; Science fiction; Superhero
- Official website: yalidreamcreations.com

Yali Dream Creations LLC, known as YDC, is an Indian comic books publisher, focused on creating original stories using comics and graphic novels. YDC was founded in 2012 by Asvin Srivatsangam, and published its first graphic novel in 2013, written by Shamik Dasgupta.

The name 'Yali' (யாளி) was inspired from Hindu mythology. Yali ([jaːɭi]; also known as Vyala or Vidala in Sanskrit) is a mythical creature seen in many Hindu temples, often sculpted onto the pillars.
