= Ram Waeerkar =

Indian comic illustrator

Ram Waeerkar (1936 – 26 February 2003) was an Indian comics artist for the series Amar Chitra Katha, based on Indian mythology, history, and folklore. He illustrated the very first issue, 'Krishna' in 1969, and many others later. He was behind the art work for nearly 90 ACK titles. In the 1980s he was an illustrator for Tinkle, a magazine edited by Anant Pai. Here, he was the man behind the art of such iconic characters as Suppandi, Pyarelal, Nasruddin Hodja, Choru and Joru and many more. Suppandi's head was illustrated as flat as he was supposed to have no brains. Ram Waeerkar died in 2003, with comics on Chanakya and Vishwamitra as his last projects. His daughter Archana Amberkar has been an artist for Tinkle magazine ever since and his son Sanjiv Waeerkar too illustrated for Tinkle in the early 1990s. Ram Waeerkar was a three time Indian National award winner. for his excellent illustrations for the book titled "Yamuna", the second one was for "Chuha Raja" a children illustration book he fondly illustrated. and the third one for his comic book "Chanakya" for ACK. He was a great lover for music and fondly played the Harmonica.

His daughter, Archana Amberkar, continued the legacy of Suppandi and Naseruddin Hodja for Tinkle. His son, Sanjiv Waeerkar, founded an animation company and created the Disney series Simple Samosa.

== Art Style ==
Ram Waeerkar's style is characterized with quick brush strokes and sharp profiles. His trademark were characters, drawn with a light touch and with delicate. He drew most of the Akbar-Birbal comics series.
