= Tulsi Comics =

Indian comics publisher

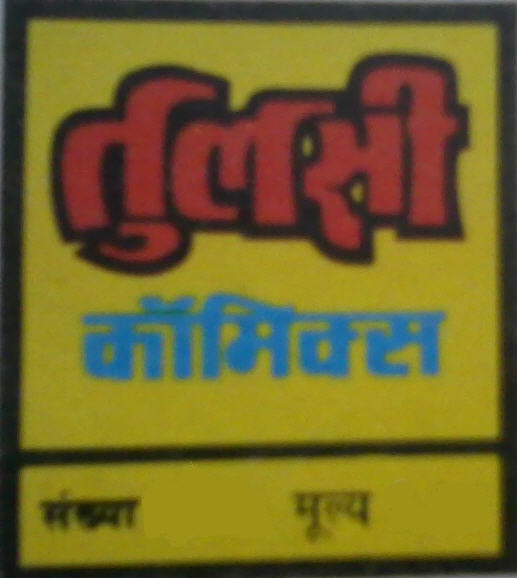

Tulsi Comics was an Indian comics publisher in the late 1980s, 1990s and early 2000s, and was a division of Tulsi Pocket Books - founded by Indian writer and author Ved Prakash Sharma.

== History ==
Backed by Tulsi Pocket Books, a popular publishers of Hindi novels in India, and backed by an established and vast customer base of the novels, Tulsi comics shut down in 2004, but after creating some of India's most famous and cherished superheroes.

Another reason for Tulsi Comics failure was that they produced story arcs in a minimum of 2–3 parts, and they never usually gave a complete story in a single issue. Since most of the comic readers in India are children who had limited pocket money, this practice ultimately backfired, and it lost popularity among its reader base. Chief among these was a huge story arc of Jambu spanning several comics lasting for more than a year.

Though this whole series was among the best Tulsi has ever offered creatively, this long continuing series, along with introducing a lot of new characters like Yosho who was blessing of God sun (formerly advertised as Osho), Yoga, Baaz and Mr. India led to its death. The new characters were just not as exciting and older characters were multi-part stories.

Tulsi comics character "Jambu" was their most successful character, created by a Ved Prakash Sharma, followed by Angara and Tausi.

== Frequency ==
Tulsi Comics were published monthly. The number of comics published every month varied from 6 to 10 (sometimes 1 or 2 digest are also published as special issues.)

Angara, Tausi and Jambu were the three main heroes of this publication.

Some of the famous comics are Jambu aur Angara ka Yudh, Jambu aur Tausi, Mar Gaya Jambu, and Jambu ke Bete.

== Head Office ==
The Head Office of the Tulsi Pocket Books is -

Tulsi Pocket Books
Delhi Road
Meerut - 250 002
Contact Number - +91-999-7023-070

== Characters ==
- Angara – a super-intelligent being created from a gorilla, a fox, an elephant, a rhino, a vulture and a lion
- Tausi – a shape-shifting snake. He is the king of Naaglok (land of snakes which reside in human form) which is in Patal lok which is said to be below the Earth. He time to time visits the current Earth also.
- Jambu – a super genius robot, fitted with the brain of its creator scientist Dr. Bhawa. He was the most popular superhero of Tulsi Comics.
- Yosho – A fiery superhero, who comes to Earth in search of his father.
- Yoga – A common man who through his Yogic powers becomes a superhero.
- Baaz – a common man who looks identical to prince of ghosts(prets) and gets the prince's costume to have superpowers which helps him in fighting crime.
- Mr India – a superhero having support of spirits of 5 scientists who act as his superpowers.
- Shalu-Kalu – a funny boy girl pair. This is the only series in Tulsi Comics which is humour based.
- Detective Bharat – a detective who solves cases along with his friend Magician Goglapasha. In his very first comics, he saves Magician Goglapasha.
- Mahabali Aakash/Major Rajesh – a masked crime fighter.
- Other than the regular characters - Tulsi Comics published comics based on Kings-Queens, Princes-Princesses, Demons-Dragons-Ghosts and moral values. They also published some Bollywood Film stories in form of comics. Due to the lack of original characters, more than half of the total comics published by the company fall in this broad category.

== Angara ==
Angara, a man made of animal body parts, was created by Dr Kunal. Angara's rhino skin made him bullet-proof, and his brain from the fox gave him extraordinary intelligence, eyes was made up of vulture's eyes, he has the power taken from elephant, heart of the lion, and body of gorilla which made him look like a human. He has special commando training taken from experts and he knows the language of every animal. Dr Kunal helped him to achieve all these qualities which makes him a Super hero.

He was born to save animals and became known as a saviour of wild life. He was a Prime Minister of Angara land (or Angara Dweep). When Angara land was under the control of the American army, animal life was almost finished. The Americans wanted to plant an army base in Angara land but Dr Kunal, a great lover and a saviour of animals, tried to reason with the Americans to no avail. The US army killed almost all the wild life in Angara land. Dr Kunal, who was also a surgeon, decided to create a powerful creature to fight the Americans' powerful army and that's how Angara was born.

Members of the Angara land ministry include:

- Angad (chimp) - as President
- Sujuki - the Army Chief or Senapati
- Chilli - Defence Minister
- Jamwant (bear) - Law Minister
- Sher Singh (lion) - Home Minister
- Gajraj (elephant) - Food Minister
- Kastoori Hirini (deer) - Finance Minister
- Khargoshi (rabbit) - Education Minister
- Jatayu
- Whale Rani
- Abu - the Spy
- Banu
- Seekhu Tota (parrot)

List of Angara Comics in chronological order (from beginning to latest)

- Angara
- Angara ki Jung
- Angara ka Atank
- Azadi ki Jung
- Angara hi Angara
- Angara ke Puzari
- Angara ki Takkar
- Angara Khatre me
- Mahakaal Angara
- Operation Angara
- Angara aur Kaala Danav
- Angara aur Khooni Bheriya
- Angara aur Kala Parvat
- Champion Angara
- Angara ka Bhookamp
- Khooni Darinda
- Angara aur Kohre ka Pret
- Mahayoddha Angara
- Angara aur Sheeba ki Jung
- Angara ka Mahasangram
- Angara Gayab
- Angara antriksh me
- Angara ki wapsi
- Angara aur Balara ki Rajkumari
- Angara aur Bulldog
- Great Angara
- Angara ka Janamdin
- Angara aur SinghRaj
- Angara Bauno ke Desh me
- Angara aur Hawa ka Beta
- Angara aur Commando Dragon
- Angara aur Bhooto ka Raja
- Angara aur Boksa ki Takkar
- Angara aur Charlie Ka Bhoot
- Angara ke 2 Dushman
- Angara Tilism me
- Double Angara
- Jai Bolo Angara Ki
- Angaara Tibet Mein
- Angara aur Raat Ka Baadshah
- Angara aur Charlie Ka Chacha
- Angara aur Panchmukhi
- Angara aur Chilli ki Agnipariksha
- Angara Jangara
- Angara aur TimTim
- Angara aur Charlie ki Hit list
- Angara aur Bichhua
- Angara aur Hurdang
- Angara ke 3 Dushman
- Ek do teen(1-2-3)
- Bulletproof Angara
- Angara Hawa Mahal Me
- Angara ka Khel
- Gazab Angara
- Angara ka Inteqam
- Angara aur Kala Bagh
- Angara Ka Khatra
- Chakkar Pe Chakkar
- Angara ka Double Cross
- Angara aur Commando No. 1
- Sheh aur Maat
- Angara ki Chot
- Angara ka Chakrvyuh
- Angara aur Hawa Hawai
- Angara aur Khatre ki Ghanti
- Angara Aur Kangaroo
- Ek Aur Ek 11
- Angara ka Anokha Dushman
- Angara aur Tambura
- Angara Aur Pishach
- Angara Ka Kohram
- Bhayankar Angara
- Jaljala
- Takkar
- Angara Aur Samudri Sher
- Angara Ka Sagar Manthan

== Plot of the Jambu storyline ==
In this storyline, Jambu gets stranded on a planet. He becomes their ruler by killing the native race's King by beating him in a duel. Later stories explored his improving relations with native race, rebuilding their society and saving them from attacks. Slowly, he discovers his doppelganger by the name of "Shanichar". He also finds out that in previous life he was tortured and killed by him and so when he was created, Shanichar's image and powers were in the sub-conscious mind of the professor whose brain he carries now.

Both of them had the final showdown with Jambu killing him with the planet's water (which has acidic properties and only the protection against it is a special element from the native planet). Instead of finishing the story arc, they continued the series by introducing "Sarkata". He finds the head who tells him that his body has liquid which can cure all diseases and grant immortality. He also tells a fake story to gain Jambu's sympathy.

The quest begins to find his whole body as the liquid can only be extracted if the whole body is brought together. After a lot of struggle he finally brings whole of his body together and brings him back to India in order to extract the Miracle Liquid called "Amrit". However, it backfires as he refuses to give anything and reveals his real name as "Sarkanda".

One of the well known comics of Jambu series is मर गया जम्बू in which two other superhero's of Tulsi comics: Angara and Tausi killed Jambu. It was a digest comics with 60 pages.

जम्बू के बेटे was the next comics after मर गया जम्बू, in which two sons of jambu takes the revenge of Jambu's death.
