= Level 10 Comics =

Indian comic book publisher company

Level10 Comics
- Industry: Comics
- Founded: 2010
- Headquarters: Mumbai, Bangalore, India
- Website: Official website

Level10 Comics is an Indian comic book publisher company, based out of Mumbai, India. Founded in late 2009 by Shreyas Srinivas and Suhas Sundar, the company started publishing comic books for the teen audience in April 2010. Its flagship monthly publication JUMP is India's first full-fledged comic magazine targeted at the 18–30 male audience. The company is currently in the process of creating a digital comic publishing platform.

== Company ==
In late 2009, Shreyas Srinivas – a former Unilever Manager and Suhas Sundar – a former software professional decided to form Level 10 Studios. The Indian comic scene mainly comprised public domain mythological characters inspired from Ramayana and Mahabharata. Level 10 Studios focused on creating original intellectual properties. The company also ran a full-fledged Studio division offering visual graphic and design services to external clients.

In December 2010, the company managed to raise angel funding from Seedfund and Mumbai Angels, two of India's prominent early-stage venture capital firms. The company was renamed as 'Level 10 Entertainment' and eventually shut down its studio division to focus on the creation of new intellectual properties. It also re-launched its flagship publication 'Comic JUMP' and decided to shift focus to the 18–30 Urban Male demographic.

=== Titles ===
Level 10 Entertainment experiments with a variety of genres. Some of their titles include the zombie thriller The Rabhas Incident, superhero epic Shaurya, fantasy series Batu-Gaiden, dark-hero titles Daksh by Shamik Dasgupta, and Odayan by Suhas Sundar. Other titles include Northern Song and Sando. They also published a variety of creator-owned titles during 2010–11.

- The Rabhas Incident is a Zombie survival horror story set in the urban Indian city of Bangalore. A mysterious virus that turns its victims to a feral, savage and rabid state has been released in Bangalore. Within a week, the entire city with its teeming populace is quarantined. Almost five weeks later, a lone R&AW agent enters this once prosperous city, as a last resort, to salvage some hope for a cure. He expects to find death, destruction and carnage, what he isn't expecting to find, is survivors. It is considered as best and first series of zombies in India.
- Shaurya is about 5 Indian teenagers with superhuman abilities which they use to defend the country against villainous characters. Set against the backdrop of Mumbai, five gifted teenagers from different parts of the country, unite to overcome their personal differences and emerge as a unified front to take on the might of a globe-spanning terrorist organization.
- Daksh is the half son of Lord Yama. Inspired loosely from Meghdutam by the great poet Kalidasa, Daksh is the story of a Yamdoot banished to earth because he dared to love in hell. Because of his desire to save the damned woman he loves, Daksh ignores his duty as a gatekeeper of hell and a score of the worst sinners escape the realm of retribution. Angered by his carelessness Yama banishes Daksh to earth to bring back the sinners, and until he completes his task his lover will burn in the deepest pits of Narrk (Hell). Thus begins Daksh's quest all across Earth to destroy the heinous sinners who escaped the bowels of hell.
- Batu Gaiden is a Manga fantasy series that incorporates cricket into mythology. It was a time of great turmoil. The gods had abandoned the earth and the three races of Humans, Asuras and Vanars (Apes) were embroiled in a bitter struggle. The final apocalyptic battle left many brave warriors dead, and the kings of the three races finally realized the folly of war. That day on the battlefield of Lords, they made a pact; there would be no more war, no more pointless loss of lives. Instead, each of the kingdoms would train their finest Yoddhas (Warriors). Train them to become Dandavas, wielders of the mystic Blade and the power Orbs. From that day hence, they would settle disputes and conflicts through the ancient sport of the gods. They would bring their mastery of shastras and celestial weapons to the playing field and this sport would be known as Kree-Kaht. A 73-minute anime adaptation, titled Batu Gaiden – The Return of Asi, was produced by Level 10, Polygon Magic and ThanksLab as a Japan-India co-production. The film premiered on Cartoon Network India on 13 April 2013. Its theme song was performed by JAM Project.
- NORTHERN SONG Set in a world inspired by Indian myth, Northern Song tells the tale of the mysterious Bala and his quest that takes him all over this mystical land, into little-known towns and villages and pits him against rakshasas, yakshas, and other fantastical creatures from Indian folklore.
- Odayan is an epic martial arts series from Level 10 Comics. Set against the backdrop of feudal Kerala, the mysterious criminal and vigilante known simply as Odayan, slowly amasses wealth and power through subterfuge and brute force and builds himself a criminal empire that ultimately challenges the reign of the Zamorin himself.

Each of the above-mentioned series' have unique design and art styles and are popular among both adults and children.

== Graphic novels ==
Level 10 has made graphic novels of Odayan and Daksh.

== See also ==
- Indian comics
