= Abid Surti =

Indian writer, artist, environmentalist (born 1935)

Aabid Surti
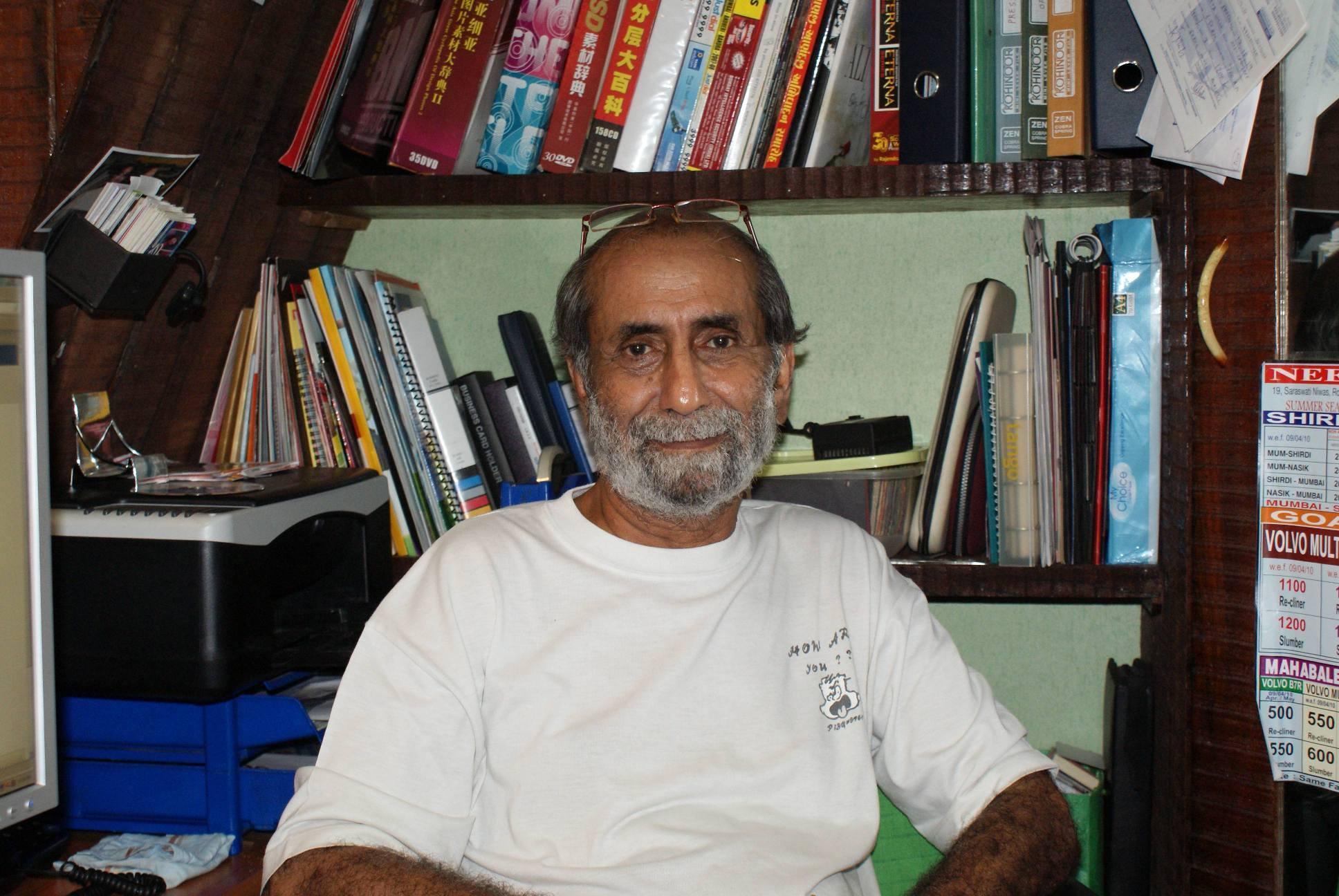
- Aabid Surti of Cartoon Kona Dabbuji Fame Dharamyug
- Born: 5 May 1935 (age 91); Vavera, British India
- Education: Diploma in Arts from J. J. School of Art
- Occupations: Author; cartoonist; painter; environmentalist
- Notable work: Bahadur, Teesri Aankh, The Black Book, In Name of Rama
- Spouse: Masooma Begum
- Children: 2
- Awards: National Award, Hindi Sahitya Sanstha Award, Gujarat Gaurav
- Website: aabidsurti.in

Abid Surti or Aabid Surti (born 5 May 1935) is an Indian painter, author, cartoonist, journalist, environmentalist, playwright and screenwriter. He was given a National Award by the government of India in 1993 for writing a series of short stories called the "Teesri Aankh".

== Life ==
Abid Surti was born in a Gujarati Muslim family on 5 May 1935 at Vavera, near Rajula, Gujarat, India to Gulam Hussain and Sakina Begum. In his childhood, at the age of 5, he almost got carried away by flood in the Tapti River near Surat. The family later shifted to Bombay and he spent his childhood in Dongri area of Mumbai. His father was follower of Sufism. He joined the J. J. School of Art in 1954 and obtained a Diploma in Arts. He was greatly influenced by the writings of 20th-century Bengali novelist, Sharat Chandra Chatterji. Besides being a writer in Hindi and Gujarati, he is also an expert in Urdu. He started his career as a freelancer. In 1965, he married Masooma Begum; they have two sons from this marriage.

== Writings ==
Surti has written short stories, novels, plays, children's books and travelogues. Several of his books have been translated into regional languages. He has also been writing for Hindi and Gujarati newspapers and magazines for over 40 years and received a National Award for his short-story collection Teesri Aankh in 1993. He became an author by accident. When his first love broke down due to family pressure, the teenaged Aabid had no one to confide in – so he began putting his story on paper. The story was published in Gujarati in 1965 as Tootela Farishta (Fallen Angels) and proved to be an unexpected success.

He has written more than 80 books, including 45 novels, 10 short story collections and 7 plays.

The autobiographical novel Musalman was an account of his childhood in the poverty-ridden Dongri area of Mumbai. His latest novel, Sufi, describes the parallel lives of two friends: the author himself and a man called Iqbal Rupani, who rose to become the kingpin of the Mumbai underworld in the 1960s and 1970s. In 1975, his fictional version based on the Devil's Bible, entitled The Black Book, created a nationwide controversy. Even amidst critical acclaim, it was translated into seven languages and voted Book of the Year in Kannada. He earned the nickname the "Salman Rushdie of India" after his Black Book was published. He has together with his son Aalif Surti and Chandrika Vyas, Rima Kashyap also penned a controversial and hard-hitting novel called In Name of Rama inspired by a true incident during the demolition of the Babri Masjid.

In 2007, he was awarded the Hindi Sahitya Sanstha Award by the Uttar Pradesh government, and was given an award by the Gujarat government for his children's literary work Rangat. Among his other novels are Canal and Daagh. He has also worked as a television and film script-writer. He was the editor of the Gujarati annual magazine Dayaro for many years.

Recently, he has sued the makers of the Bollywood film Atithi Tum Kab Jaoge, which he says used his Gujarati novel Bauter Varas No Babo, published in 1976 and later translated into Hindi as Bahatar Saal Ka Baccha.

He has written graphic children's novels in Hindi, including Buddh kyun muskuraye 2500 saal baad (Why did the Buddha smile after 2500 years). He has also written satirical gazal with common English words.

=== Works ===
Gujarati

- Tootela Farishta (1965)
- Dhutro
- Aabh ma khilelu phool
- Kapurush Mahapurush
- Pagle Pagle Pyar
- Soofi
- Kundali
- Fokatlalno Varghodo
- Adhura anek
- Vasant avyano mane vahem
- Nana Nana Rakshash
- Aathmo akash
- Kala gulab
- Pāpana pārano pradeṡa
- Ram asrey
- Rang badalti Roma
- Radata Gulmohar
- Boter varasno babo
- Mari shreshth vartao
- Alag Matina Marad
- Baraf na chhera
- Ek zalak Japan ni
- Dagh
- Sukhano relo same par
- Musalman (translated into Eng. as Sufi)
- Jaldi Kar, Juliet (play)

Hindi Collections

- 10 Pratinidhi Kahaniyan
- 21 Shreshtha Kahaniyan
- 365 Kahaniyan (collection of stories of the well-known author)

Novels

- Kathavachak
- Adhi Stri
- Bahata Paani
- Bahattar Saal Ka Bachcha (translated from Guj)
- Besabab
- Biswin Sadi Ka Aakhri Dashak
- Aadmi aur Chuhe
- Chamatkari Ladaki
- Cabaret Dancer
- Charitraheen
- Daag
- Dastoor
- Kale Gulab
- Kapurush Mahapurush
- Khoya Hua Chehra
- Kokh Se Kabra Tak Sati
- Kora Canvas
- Labangi
- Maan
- Mere Papa Ki Shadi
- Soonsaan
- Tanha
- Vasak Sajja

Stories

- Atankit
- Bijliyan
- Dhup Chhaon
- Gujrati Ki Shreshtha Vyangya Kathaen
- Teesri Aankh

Travel

- Awara Abid

Satire

- 365 Chutkule (selection of jokes)
- Bundabandi

Plays

- Munchon Wali Begam

English

Novels

- The Black Book (Kaali Kitaab)
- In name of Rama
- The Golf Widow
- Little nino and his secret beard.

Plays

- He is Radha

== Paintings ==
Surti has been acclaimed as a painter, credited with using creative and original techniques to paint with oil and watercolours. His use of acrylic colours applied to Italian art paper is also said to be out of this world. An accomplished painter, he has held 16 exhibitions in India and abroad. In his early years, he invented an innovative technique called "mirror collage" which won critical acclaim in Japan. In 1971, the Indian government commissioned a short film to showcase his creative work.

== Cartoons and comic-books ==
The first cartoon characters he created were in 1952–53 for a Gujarati magazine Ramakadu. It consisted of a comic feature of four pages in colour with three prominent characters – a boy, a girl and a monkey, entitled Rang Lakhudi. As a cartoonist, he later created the lovable simpleton Dhabbuji. The original and popular cartoon strip has been one of the longest-running comic strips in India, running without a break for over 30 years. It was the weekly comic strip that first appeared in Hindi magazine Dharmyug. He also created another comic book character, Bahadur, which achieved a large fan following, when the comics started to be published in Indrajal Comics from 1978. He also created other comic book characters like Inspector Azad, Inspector Vikram and a lady character named Shuja. The cartoon Dhabbuji and comics of Bahadur, Inspector Azad, Inspector Vikram and Shuja were all also published in English. Raj Kapoor once wanted to make a film based on Inspector Azad, showing that the popularity of his comic strips were high. Further, his famous comic strips Doctor Chinchoo Ke Chamatkar, which was published in the Hindi magazine Parag from 1963 to 1965 is being serialised by the National Book Trust as Doctor Chinchoo Ke Kaarnamein.

== As an environmentalist ==
Abid Surti founded Drop Dead, a water conservation initiative in Mumbai in 2007. Every Sunday, along with a plumber and an assistant, he visits houses in and around Mira Road and fixes dripping taps. He simply replaces old O-ring rubber gaskets with new ones. The idea struck him in 2007 when he noticed the dripping tap in his friend's house. "A tap that drips water once every second wastes about 1,000 litres of water every month so imagine how much we all waste," he points out. Surti and his assistants raise awareness through posters and pamphlets. He pays for all expenses from his pocket.

== Documentary ==
Pramod Pati has directed a documentary on Surti. Abid (1972) explores the inner world of Surti who had desire to "live within a painting". In this film using pixilation technique, Surti emerges from the ground, transforms a white room with painted images on walls, ceiling, and floor, akin to creating a live painting.

== Awards and recognition ==
He has been awarded National Award 1993, Hindi Sahitya Sanstha Award, Gujarat Gaurav.
