= Odayan =

2012 comic-book series

Publication information
- Publisher: Level 10 Comics
- Publication date: 2012
- No. of issues: 8

Creative team
- Written by: Suhas Sundar
- Artist: Deepak Sharma

Collected editions
- Paperback: ISBN 978-93-81766-08-8

Odayan is an Indian martial arts comic book series, created by Suhas Sundar and Deepak Sharma, and published by Level 10 Comics. Set against the backdrop of feudal Kerala, the series revolves around Odayan, a mysterious vigilante who slowly builds a criminal empire which is poised to destabilize the reign of the Zamorin.

Suhas Sundar won the award for Best Writer at Comic Con India (2012) for penning Odayan: Aarambham, and Deepak Sharma was nominated for the Best Artist category.

== Plot ==
Odayan is set in Bhargavakshetram, an alternate version of feudal Kerala. The story begins with the legend of Parashurama's axe, which is broken into twenty-one pieces and scattered across Bhargavakshetram. Odayan, the titular character, sets out to gather all the pieces of the fabled axe. His quest involves hunting down a Kalarippayattu master named Kalan because he possesses a piece of Parashurama's axe. After winning a piece of Parashurama's axe in a duel with Kalan, Odayan goes to Malabar, a port city in Bhargavakshetram. There Odayan earns the reputation of helping some potential allies while intimidating others into joining his criminal empire. He becomes more powerful, causing more instability for the Zamorin's reign. Yet it is a past tragedy that drives Odayan to choose a life of lawlessness.

Meanwhile, Kalan's son, Unni, is motivated by revenge to undergo Kalarippayattu training.
