= Suppandi =

- Promotional art for Suppandi by ACK Media

Publication information
- Publisher: ACK Comics
- First appearance: Tinkle No. 27, January 1983
- Created by: Ram Waeerkar

In-story information
- Abilities: foolishness, stupidity

Suppandi is a comic character who appears in Tinkle comics. Suppandi is typically a village simpleton and is still considered the most famous and loved among the characters appearing in Tinkle.

Suppandi made his debut in Tinkle No. 27 in January 1983. Unlike other Tinkle characters, he was not originally conceptualized by the creators of the magazine. He was born out of 3 narrative stories sent by P. Varadarajan from Trichy. The concept was rendered into a comic format in Tinkle studios, with illustrations by one of the famous yesteryear artists, Ram Waeerkar. Suppandi is also shown as an ignoramus but a faithful servant to his masters most of the time. His stupidity or his virtue of being an ignoramus has cost him many a job. Often Suppandi is shown living in big towns and cities.

Ram Waeerkar carried on drawing for Suppandi till his death in February 2003, after which it is now being taken care of by Ram Waeerkar's daughter, Archana Amberkar. Between 1991 and 1993, and also between 2003 and 2004, Suppandi stories were also illustrated by Sanjiv Waeerkar, Ram Waaerkar's son. Suppandi is based on the Tamil folklore character Chappandi. Suppandi and Shikari Shambu have been featured on YouTube since 2013.

Suppandi's popularity outside India grew steadily in the late 2010s as an internet meme on YouTube.
