= Shamik Dasgupta (writer) =

Indian comic book writer

- Area: Writer
- Notable works: Ramayan 3292 AD; The Caravan; The Village; Rakshak

Shamik Dasgupta is an Indian comic book writer. He has done work for Virgin Comics, specifically for Ramayan 3392 A.D. a series based on the ancient Hindu epic Ramayana and set in a distant future. He has also written a one shot horror graphic novel called Virulents.

He is the editor in chief of Arkin Comics, a popular 3D comic book in India which is custom made to feature the comic reader.

In 2012 he started working on a graphic novel named 'The Caravan' for Yali Dream Creations. This was released in 2013. The Caravan is a horror graphic novel written by Shamik Dasgupta. Dasgupta described it as "a classic horror/action/adventure in the trend of From Dusk till Dawn and 30 Days of Night copiously coated with spicy Bollywood masala." For the same publisher, he did the graphic novel adaptation 'Devi Chaudhurani', which was originally written by Bankim Chandra Chatterji.

== Career ==
His career started with Virgin Comics, and now he is employed by Yali Dream Creations as a Chief Creative Director. Since 2012, Shamik Dasgupta has created The Caravan, The Caravan Blood War, Devi Chaudhurani, Rakshak: Origin Series and The Village. He also created TNT for Speech Bubble Entertainment.

Dasgupta's comic book series, Rakshak, has been acquired in December 2019 by director Sanjay Gupta for motion film adaptation.
