= Bahadur (comics) =

Indian comic strip

Publication information
- Publisher: Indrajal Comics
- First appearance: 1976
- Created by: Abid Surti

In-story information
- Team affiliations: Citizen's Security Force, Mukhia (local village headman), Lakhan, Sukhia (police officer)
- Notable aliases: The Brave Man www.bahadurbela.com

Bahadur (meaning The Brave Man) is a comic book superhero published by Indrajal Comics and created by Aabid Surti in 1976. Although it had been initially created by Aabid Surti a few years earlier, it was finally offered to Indrajal Comics. Aabid Surti was at that time freelancing for Bennett, Coleman & Co. Ltd. After he moved on, Jagjit Uppal took over the task. The artwork was illustrated by Govind Brahmania and later by his son, B Pramod.

The comics were published in various languages including Hindi, English and Bengali. Besides regular comics, the series was also featured in dailies and weeklies along with other comic heroes. Apart from India, there's a huge fan club of Bahadur, abroad.

Reportedly, there are Bahadur fan clubs in the USA.

== Characters ==
=== Bahadur ===
Bahadur comics was created in December, 1976. Dacoity was at its first in India in the 1970s and the Bahadur series focussed a lot on dacoits.

Bahadur himself was the son of a dacoit Bhairav Singh who died in combat with Police. Bahadur, then a teenager, was adopted by Vishal, the police officer who shot Bhairav Singh. Bahadur initially wants to avenge the death of his father, but eventually switches sides with the police to fight evil for the rest of his life.

=== Citizen's Security Force (CSF) ===
Upon growing up, Bahadur set up the Citizen's Security Force or the Hindi translation Naagrik Suraksha Dal (NASUD) that aids the police in combating dacoits. Though Bahadur dealt with many kinds of villains, he displayed a much softer corner towards dacoits trying to rehabilitate them. One of his assistants Lakhan was also a reformed dacoit. After surrendering to the police, he started helping Bahadur in curbing crime.

=== Bela ===
Bela is Bahadur's love interest in the comic series and very skilled in martial arts. She assists Bahadur in his missions against the villains. Whenever, Bahadur would ask Bela to go out with him Bela's favorite reply was "Neki, aur puchh, puchh".

=== Others ===
The other prominent characters featuring regularly in the series were Sukhiya, Mukhiya and Lakhan. While Sukhiya was a policeman, Mukhiya (meaning head of the village in Hindi) was the village leader.

Bahadur also got a dog Chammiya in some of the later stories.

== Evolution ==

The stories evolved with time and portrayed the changing face of India. While beginning with dacoits in deep ravines and the small town of Jaigarh, Bahadur later moved to tackling themes such as espionage. The town itself moved from being a small sleepy town to a modern city.

Aabid Surti conceived of Bahadur and started the comic strip in 1976. "Bennett, Coleman & Co wanted me to create an Indian character that could take on the popularity of the four foreign comics that ruled the market in India then—The Phantom, Mandrake, Flash Gordon and Tarzan," he says. "During that time, the Chambal Valley was becoming increasingly notorious, and there were exhortations to people to group together to fight crime. So I developed the character of Bahadur as someone who helps create a citizens' police force to fight the dacoits."

About Bahadur's saffron kurta and jeans, the author Aabid Surti says, "A kurta and saffron were symbols of Indianness. And jeans were a Western import and indicated progress. Hence, the combination,". Aabid Surti showed Bahadur and his girlfriend, Bela, in a live-in relationship in his Bahadur comics, something unheard of in those times. But it was very well accepted by the audience."

Though Bahadur's portrayal also changed with time as the artists drawing the series changed, Bahadur's appearance remained the same until 1986, when his trade mark long-hair chopped to shorter & a neat look, which gave him a necessary urban look, and his outfit was changed from an orange kurta to a tight-fitting pink long-sleeved T-shirt.

Bahadur comics series stopped in the year 1990 when Bennett, Coleman & Co stopped publishing Indrajal Comics.
