= Indrajal Comics =

Indian comics title

- Parent company: The Times Group
- Status: Discontinued
- Founded: 1964-1990
- Country of origin: India
- Headquarters location: Mumbai, India
- Publication types: Phantom, Mandrake, Flash Gordon

Indrajal Comics was a comic book series in India launched by the publisher of The Times of India, Bennet, Coleman & Co in March 1964. The first 32 issues contained Lee Falk's The Phantom stories, but thereafter, the title alternated between various King Features characters, including Lee Falk's Mandrake, Alex Raymond's Flash Gordon, Rip Kirby and Phil Corrigan, Roy Crane's Buz Sawyer, Allen Saunders' Mike Nomad, Kerry Drake, and Steve Dowling's Garth. Later in December 1976, it also published Bahadur, an Indian comic hero created by Aabid Surti.

== Publication history ==
Back in the 1960s, when The Phantom comic strip by Lee Falk grew very popular in India, Anant Pai and others in Indrajal Comics collected them and published it as a comic book.

Indrajal Comics commenced with a monthly schedule. The first 10 issues devoted 16 pages to The Phantom, so many of the stories were edited to fit this format. Twelve pages were devoted to general knowledge (Gold Key style) and other stuff. The next 19 issues were 20-24 pages. Beginning with issue #29, Indrajal standardised on the conventional 32 page format. The series switched to fortnightly publication from #35 on 1 Jan 1967 (released on the 1st and 15th of each month). Mandrake made his first of many appearances in #46 (15 Jul 1967). Indrajal Comics changed to a weekly schedule from #385 on November 1–7, 1981 (The Embers of Fury, Part I). This issue featured "The Phantom" once again.Starting with #789 on 20 Aug 1989 (Vol 26 No 33), the series once again returned to a fortnightly schedule with 36 pages each.

In 1981, yearly subscriptions could be purchased for rupees 64. Each issue was individually numbered until 2 Jan 1983 when the editors decided to use a volume and number typical of periodical publications. Hence, #444 was identified as Vol. 20 No. 1 and so forth. The front cover design was also changed, with the introduction of the distinctive Indrajal Comics banner.

The cover artwork for the first 50 or so issues of Indrajal Comics was done by B.Govind, with the back cover featuring a pin-up poster. Govind's painted covers are highly regarded amongst Indian Phantom fans, and are on par with those of George Wilson for the Gold Key series and the Avon novels from the USA. The Indrajal Comics were a full-colour production from #8 onwards, with The Phantom's costume being coloured blue for the first 10 issues in the series, but thereafter the colour was changed to the more traditional purple. Several of the covers (e.g. #1, #9, #10 and #13) even dared to show The Phantom's eyes.

Names of some places and people were changed while publishing some stories from The Phantom, for example, Bengali was changed to Denkali to avoid confusion to Indian readers, the "Singh Brotherhood" were known as "Singa" pirates, etc.

The western comics that were reprinted in Indrajal were heavily censored. For example, scenes where The Phantom innocuously kissed his girlfriend Diana Palmer, were removed.

A total of 803 Indrajal Comics were published, excluding #123 and #124 which were not printed due to industrial strike action. More than half of these issues contained Phantom stories.

== Indrajal goes regional ==
The regional version came in Bengali from January,1966 and the Indrajal #23 was #1 in Bengali - A Search for "Indrajal" Returns the registered publications for different languages (Marathi, Hindi, English, Bengali, Malayalam, Kannada, Gujarati and Tamil). A little trivia on how Indrajal Comics were introduced in the various languages prior the Bengali version, which was introduced on the 3rd year of Ijc, on Jan'66, and was 6th in the line....:

(I) Only English, Hindi & Marathi versions were introduced from the very beginning i.e. from #1(Mar'64).So the first 10 issues were published only in these 3 languages. (II) Gujarati & Tamil versions were introduced on the next year(Jan'65) i.e. #11 in the original series was #1 in these 2 languages and hence this issue(#23:Scarlet Sorceress) was actually #13 in Gujarati & Tamil..]

== History of the Back-up Features ==
In addition to the main story, the books had various newspaper humour strips, short stories & general knowledge snippets as the back-up features. The most notable ones were "Henry", "Chimpoo", "Kittu", "Chalky", "The Little King", "No Comment", "Timpa", "Capree(animal world)", "Ancient World History", "Ripley's Believe It or Not" and many more. Advertising pages were reserved in all of the published issues, featured classic Indian brands like "Parle," BSA," Nutramul", "Gold-spot", "Gems", "Poppins", "Kissan" etc. Some issues do have advertisement of State Bank of India, an Indian nationalised bank, to promote bank account for children.

== End ==
Starting with #789 on 20 Aug 1989 (Vol 26 No 33), the series briefly returned to a fortnightly schedule with 36 pages each, before the publishers decided to cancel the series in their 27th year of production. The last issue was #805, published on 16 Apr 1990 (Vol 27 No 8:Dara:The Jaws of Treachery).

== List of comics ==
Issue number	Volume number	Protagonist	Issue title	Date of publication	Original price
1		Phantom	The Phantom's Belt	March 1, 1964	
2			Prince Orq	April 1, 1964	
3			The Challenge Of Cannibals	May 1, 1964	
4			The Phantom And The Impostor	June 1, 1964	
5			The Phantoms Isle Of Eden	July 1, 1964	
6			The Lunar Cult	August 1, 1964	
7			The Man-Eating Plant	September 1, 1964	
8			The Playmate	October 1, 1964	
9			Thugs in Denkali	November 1, 1964	
10			The Phantoms Ring	December 1, 1964	
11			The Phantoms Treasure	January 1, 1965	
12			The Phantom Is Chained	February 1, 1965	
13			The Phantom And Samaris	March 1, 1965	
14			The Mystery Of The Rattle	April 1, 1965	
15			The Unknown Commander	May 1, 1965	
16			The Diamond Cup	June 1, 1965	
17			The Mysterious Passenger	July 1, 1965	
18			The Golden Princess	August 1, 1965	
19			Moogoos Dolls	September 1, 1965	
20			The Mysterious Bank Robbery	October 1, 1965	
21			King Pepes Bride	November 1, 1965	
22			A String Of Black Pearls	December 1, 1965	
23			The Scarlet Sorceress	January 1, 1966	
24			The Human Beast	February 1, 1966	
25			Around The Moon	March 1, 1966	
26			The Jungle Patrol	April 1, 1966	
27			The Mystery Of Gandor	May 1, 1966	
28			The Trembling Jungle	June 1, 1966	
29			The Secret Of Nacabres Castle	July 1, 1966	
30			The Phantom And The Girls	August 1, 1966	
31			The Deadly Swamp	September 1, 1966	
32			Oogooru The Deity Of Murder	October 1, 1966	
33			Walt Disneys Treasure Island	November 1, 1966	
34			The Phantom Meets the Super Apes	December 1, 1966	
35			Walt Disneys Robin Hood	January 1, 1967	
36			The Phantom Is Blinded	January 15, 1967	
37			Walt Disneys Zorro		
38			Walt Disneys Man In Space		
39			Wamba Falls Inn		
40			Walt Disneys Rob Roy		
41			The Mystery Of The Veiled Lady		
42			Walt Disneys Mickey Mouse - The Missing Aircraft Carrier		
43			The Mystery Of The Diamond Queen		
44			Walt Disneys Mickey Mouse - The Time Clock		
45			The Phantom And The Deadly Web		
46			Mandrake And The Doomsday		
47			The Adventures Of The Girl Phantom		
48			The Magic Mountain		
49			The Secrets Of The Phantom		
50			Mandrake And The Black Wizard		
51			The Phantom And The River Pirates		
52			The White Goddess		
53			Thugs In The City Park		
54			The Great Riddle		
55			The Villains Challenge	December 1, 1967	
56			The Phantom And Delilah		
57			The Terror Tiger		
58			The Sixth Man		
59			The Phantom And The Sleeping Giant		
60			The Phantom And The Cold Fire Worshippers		
61			The Story Of Hero		
62			The Lost City		
63			Jungle Drums		
64			The Deadly Tour		
65			The Jade Palace		
66			The Telltale Doll	May 15, 1968	
67			The Phantom And The Sea God		
68			Terror From Outer Space		
69			The Hunters		
70			Specter From Space		
71			The Phantom And The Mysterious Ruins		
72			The Tournament Of Death		
73			The Hairy Monsters		
74			The Curse Of Lago		
75			The Disturber		
76			The Phantoms Jungle Patrol		
77			The Treacherous Gang		
78			The Kidnappers		
79			Death Trap		
80			Masked Marvel		
81			The Giant Toothache		
82			The Missing Bridegroom		
83			The Incredible Space Menace		
84			The Money-Mad Maniac		
85			Sheng The Savage		
86			The Blue Gang		
87			The Legend Of Durugu		
88			Flying Robots		
89			The Gray Gang		
90			The Mouse-Trap		
91			The Dilemma		
92			The Giant Termites		
93			Mysteries Of The Pharaoh		
94			The Enchanted Land		
95			Night In Denkali		
96			Mysterious Guide		
97			The Tiger Girl		
98			The Phantom And The Bad Ones		
99			The Witch Queen		
100			The Phantoms Death		
101			The Satchel		
102			The Floating City		
103			Villains Paradise		
104			The Ghost Tribe		
105			The Drummer Of Timpenni		
106			The Mysterious Toy		
107			The Giant Ape		
108			Plant Attack		
109			The River Of Death		
110			Trial By Fire		
111			Ming The Merciless		
112			Royal Wedding		
113			The Grand Prize		
114			The Fiftieth Wife		
115			The Phantoms New Faith		
116			Gangsters Dive		
117			The Iron Monster		
118			The Masked Ball		
119			The Spy-Plot		
120			The Killers		
121			The Witches		
122			Walkers Table		
123			Not Published due to Strike		
124			Not Published due to Strike		
125			The False Mark		
126			The Jungle Home		
127			Cape Cod Caper		
128			The Criminal Team		
129			The Sacred Idol		
130			The Night Of The Theft		
131			The Deadly Trap		
132			The Eccentric Count		
133			The Death House Of Hydra	May 1, 1971	
134			The Crime School		
135			The Mystery Of The Golden Sand	June 1, 1971	
136			The Cruel Conspiracy	June 15, 1971	
137			The Rain Stopper		
138			The Trail Of Death		
139			The Hunters Prey		
140			The Captive Herd		
141			The Gangsters Graveyard		
142			The Evil Ones		
143			The Missing Daddy		
144			The Mysterious Eight		
145			The Secret Mission		
146			Mandrake And The Cobra		
147			The Secret Of The Misty Mountains		
148			Conspirators Of Tulana		
149			The Evil Spell		
150			Mandrake And The Goldman		
151			The Gladiator		
152			Jumba The Giant Elephant		
153			The Master Of Disguise		
154			The Hijackers		
155			The Flying Saucers		
156			Golden Ransom		
157			The Black Gold Pirates		
158			The Money Lenders		
159			The Secret Cave Of Kings		
160			The Skull Cave		
161			Year 50,000 AD	July 1, 1972	
162			The Diamond Mountain		
163			The False Will		
164			The Wonder Child		
165			The Fabulous Trophy		
166			The Amazing Island		
167			The Killer Planet		
168			Where Is Diana??		
169			Partners In Crime		
170			Deadly Trio		
171			The Phantom And The Vultures		
172			Plutonium Raiders		
173			Return Of The Golden Comet		
174			Romantic Witch		
175			Flying Snakes		
176			The Giant Man		
177			The Robot Family		
178			Death Speaks		
179			The Third Phantom		
180			Cobras Trap		
181			The Phantom In Flames		
182			The Golden People		
183			Sky-High Piracy		
184			The Brain-Seller		
185			The Ring Of Saturn		
186			Gold Or Death		
187			Floating Couple		
188			Head Hunters Of Tirangi		
189			The Skragg Mission		
190			Hypnotic Beast		
191			The Kaluga Giant		
192			The Eccentric Genius		
193			Trapped On Mars		
194			Night On The Mesa		
195			Messengers Of Death		
196			The Village Of Ghosts		
197			To Each His Own		
198			The Outlaws Herd		
199			The Bridge Busters		
200			The Ratmen Of Rodencia		
201			The Swamp Of Death		
202			The Tank Battle At Sukha Nallah		
203			Treasure From No Mans Land		
204			The Mystery Of Zokko		
205			The Little People		
206			Operation JIG-3	May 15, 1974	
207			The Crystal Creatures		
208			The Cruel Contessa		
209			Tulsidasas Ramacharit Manas Part 1		
210			The Shark Island		
211			The Vampires		
212			On The Sands Of Time		
213			The Killer Cobra		
214			The Magic Drum		
215			Curse Of The Goddess		
216			Test Of A Magician		
217			The Escape		
218			Mystery Of The Stone Face		
219			Kunhali Marakkar	December 1, 1974	
220			The Vandal Looters		
221			The King Of Kaushambi		
222			The Forbidden Jungle		
223			Komagata Maru		
224			Destination Venus		
225			The Little Princess		
226			Gigantic Octopus		
227			The Devils Trap		
228			Tulsidasas Ramacharit Manas Part 2		
229			The Phantoms Promise		
230			Death Warrant		
231			Stranger In Desert		
232			Rescue Mission: Mercury		
233			The Golden Woods		
234			The Two Headed Bull		
235			Many Faces Of Death		
236			The Towering Colossus		
237			An Oath Of Vengeance		
238			The Jewel Deal		
239			The Solar Power Station		
240			Duel With Death		
241			The College Of Magic		
242			Bahubali		
243			The Clutches Of Destiny		
244			Skull Cave Attacked		
245			The Phantom & The Beast		
246			The Incredible Thief		
247			The Indian Robin-Hood Sultana		
248			A Strange World		
249			Many Centuries Ahead		
250			Goldbeards Strike Force		
251			Killer Computer		
252			Monster Of The Cave		
253			The Nightmares		
254			The Phantoms Noble Lineage		
255			The Shining City		
256			The Goggle-Eye Pirates		
257			Mandrake And The Bandits Of Magna	July 1, 1976	
258			Hoogaan The Witchman		
259			Apollos Chariot	January 1, 1976	
260			The Killer Gang		
261			The Ten Days		
262			Merchants Of Death Part-I		
263			Merchants Of Death Part-II		
264			A Dead Mans Promise		
265			The Ghost Town		
266			The Strange Hunt		
267			The Red Bricks House		
268			The Secret Plot		
269			Terror In Denkali		
270			Bahadur And The Blood Sucker		
271			The Wonder Jewel		
272			Mahabharata Part-1	February 15, 1977	
273			The Professional Killer		
274			The Haunted Beach		
275			The Masked Assassin		
276			Bahadur And The Murderous Trio		
277			The First Phantom		
278			Mahabharata Part-2	May 15, 1977	
279			The River Of Fire Part-I		
280			The River Of Fire Part-II		
281			The Sea Of Horror		
282			The Savages Of Arboria		
283			The Crime Wave In Mawitaan		
284			The White Ghosts Den		
285			The Slave Traders		
286			The Magic Mantle		
287			The Dare-Devils		
288			Brukka The Ruthless		
289			The Monster From Mars		
290			The Trickster	November 15, 1977	
291			Tremors Of Fear		
292			Bahadur And The Challenge Of The Witch	December 15, 1977	
293			The Taste Of Poison		
294			Satans Man		
295			The Crucial Moment		
296			Bahadur And The Bandit Chief	February 15, 1978	
297			The Spy-Web		
298			The Master Criminal		
299			The Enchanting Island		
300			Bahadur And The Fire-Birds		
301			The Monster Of The Green Valley Part-I		
302			The Monster Of The Green Valley Part-II		
303			The Sacred Pledge		
304			Galactic Treasure Hunt		
305			The Phantom Meets The Space-Demons		
306			Bahadur In The Double-Trap		
307			The Forsaken Cave		
308			The Doomed Planet		
309			The Law Of The Jungle		
310			50000 Miles In Space	September 15, 1978	
311			The Ghost Who Walks		
312			Bahadur & the Kung-Fu Kings	October 15, 1978	
313			The Phantom The Protector		
314			The Undersea Humans		
315			The Tyrant Of Tarakimo		
316			Bahadur And The Child-Lifters		
317			The Phantom Weds		
318			The Maze Of Horror		
319			Demons From The Dark Part-I		
320			Demons From The Dark Part-II		
321			The Benevolent Ghost		
322			Bahadur & The Invisible Saviour	March 15, 1979	
323			The Crucial Combat		
324			The Death Chant On Klet		
325			The Swamp Dragon		
326			Bahadur And The Gang Of Imposters		
327			The Tale Of Devil Part-I	June 1, 1979	
328			The Tale Of Devil Part-II	June 15, 1979	
329			The Phantom The Superhuman		
330			The Blackmailer		
331			The Delta Pirates		
332			The Hulking Horror		
333			The Valley Of No Return		
334			Invasion Of The Earth		
335			The Blood-Thirsty Bandits Part-I		
336			The Blood-Thirsty Bandits Part-II		
337			The Corba Diamonds		
338			The Hangmans Knot		
339			The Return Of The Beast		
340			The Curse Of Gold		
341			The Secret Of Vacul Castle Part-I		
342			The Secret Of Vacul Castle Part-II		
343			The Black Stinger		
344			The Mystery Of The Unknown Valley		
345			The Scorpia Gang Part-I	March 1, 1980	
346			The Scorpia Gang Part-II		
347			The Curse Of Loki		
348			The Dragnet		
349			The Revenge Of The Ghost Part-I		
350			The Revenge Of The Ghost Part-II		
351			The Revenge Of The Ghost Part-III		
352			The Secret Assignment		
353			The Mystery Of The Sunken Treasure		
354			The Tempest Of Fury		
355			The Infuriated Ghost		
356			The Crime Busters		
357			The Star Of Dangalla		
358			The Desert Smugglers		
359			The 22nd Phantom Part-I		
360			The 22nd Phantom Part-II		
361			The Phantoms Wrath		
362			The Battle Of The Giants		
363			The Jungle Gold		
364			The Web Of Hatred		
365			The Slave Market Of Mucar Part-I		
366			The Slave Market Of Mucar Part-II		
367			The Diamond Robbers		
368			Bharat Bahubali		
369			The Desperados		
370			The Mystery Of The Headless Ghost		
371			The Royal Prisoner		
372			The Ring Of Fear		
373			The Legendary Foe		
374			The Golden Tower		
375			Satans Disciples Part-I	June 1, 1981	
376			Satans Disciples Part-II	June 15, 1981	
377			The Monster Boys		
378			The Roughneck Mob		
379			The Sting Of Venom		
380			The Legend Of The Giants		
381			The Demons Of Koqania		
382			The Spectre Of Crime		
383			The Devils Domain		
384			The Flames Of Vengeance		
385			Embers Of Fury Part-I		
386			Embers Of Fury Part-II		
387			The Hidden Vipers		
388			Betrayal Of The Oath		
389			The Stranglers Trap		
390			The Smugglers Ring Part-I		
391			The Smugglers Ring Part-II		
392			The Horror Dungeons		
393			The Magic Sword		
394			The Call Of The Jungle		
395			The Dragons		
396			The Broken Strings		
397			Aleena The Enchantress Part-I	January 4, 1982	
398			Aleena The Enchantress Part-II	January 31, 1989	
399			The Wax Trap		
400			Abode Of The Ghosts Part-I		
401			Abode Of The Ghosts Part-II		
402			The Scary Whisper		
403			The Angry Shark Boy		
404			The Vengeful Outlaws		
405			The Legend Of Valour Part-I		
406			The Legend Of Valour Part-II		
407			The Fugitive		
408			The Gold Hunt		
409			The Dreaded Deep Woods		
410			The Million Dollar Ransom		
411			The Sinister World Of 8	May 16, 1982	
412			The Missing Prince Part-I		
413			The Missing Prince Part-II		
414			The Missing Prince Part-III	June 2, 1982	
415			In The Devils Grip	June 13, 1982	
416			The Night On The Forsaken Island		
417			The Lost Island		
418			The Jailbreak		
419			The Highway Gang		
420			The Fiendish Mission		
421			The Race For Power		
422			Mandrakes Godchild		
423			The Victim At Darehouse		
424			The Robot Invaders		
425			The City of Harmony		
426			The Arson Ring		
427			The Dauntless Protector		
428			The Eagles Lair		
429			The Tormenting Spectre		
430			The Masked Panther		
431			The Magicians Challenge Part-I	October 3, 1982	
432			The Magicians Challenge Part-II	October 10, 1982	
433			Treacherous Vandals		
434			The Trial On Mars		
435			The Desert Fox		
436			The Reign Of Justice Part-I	November 7, 1982	
437			The Reign Of Justice Part-II	November 14, 1982	
438			The Reign Of Justice Part-III	November 21, 1982	
439			The Maze Of Treachery		
440			The Haunted Lodge		
441			The Chateau Of Intrigues		
442			The Haunt Of The Ghost		
443			The Space Invaders		
444			The Iron Willed Saviour (Part 1 of 3)	January 2, 1983	
445			The Iron Willed Saviour (Part 2 of 3)	January 9, 1983	
446			The Iron Willed Saviour (Part 3 of 3)		
447			The Hanging Sabre		
448			The Crime Tangle		
449			The Green Eyed Monster Part-I		
450			The Green-Eyed Monster Part-II		
451			The Green-Eyed Monster Part-III		
452			The Secret Of The Blue Mountain		
453			The Golden Talisman		
454			The Mystery At Kanchenjunga		
455			The Conspirators Web Part-I		
456			The Conspirators Web Part-II		
457			The Dream Island		
458			Splinters Of Rage		
459			The Trauma Of Fear		
460			The Missing Dorian Diamond		
461			The Mighty Vigilantes		
462			The Phantoms Valiant Son Part-I		
463			The Phantoms Valiant Son Part-II		
464			The Duel At Shikargarh		
465			The Witches Cove		
466			The Captive Couple		
467			The Invincible Ghost	June 12, 1983	
468			Adventure On Venusport		
469			Satan Commands		
470			The Mysterious Cutlass		
471			The Great Bank Robbery		
472			The Mystery Mansion		
473			The Impending Doom		
474			Trials Of A Princess		
475			The Avaricious Prince		
476			Stars Of Fire		
477			The Treasure Trail		
478			Brush With Death		
479			The Game Of Treachery		
480			Beyond The Boiling River	September 11, 1983	
481			The Phantoms Adored Gem Part-I		
482			The Phantoms Adored Gem Part-II		
483			Mongos Rebel Warlords		
484			Operation Cancer		
485			The Magnificent Emblem Part-I		
486			The Magnificent Emblem Part-II		
487			The Man-Hunting Witch		
488			The Savage Family		
489			The Beckoning Fetters		
490			The Stalking Fury		
491			The Concorde Mystery		
492			The Valley Of The Living Dead		
493			The False Legacy		
494			The Emperors Dream		
495			The Drug Scandal		
496			The Legendary Benefactor		
497			The Warumba Treasure		
498			The Sly Sea Wolves		
499			The Phantoms Paradise		
500			Ambush On The Beach		
501			The Sacred City Of Gold		
502			The Mantle Of Mystery		
503			The Star of the East (Part 1 of 3)		
504			The Star of the East (Part 2 of 3)		
505			The Star of the East (Part 3 of 3)		
506			Treasure In The Ruins		
507			The Iron Maidens		
508			The Alien Hypnotic Giant		
509			The Fury Of The Sea Goddess Part-I		
510			The Fury Of The Sea Goddess Part-II		
511			The Doomed Captives		
512			The Conspiring Ogre		
513			The Land Grabbers		
514			The Witch Queens Prophecy Part-I		
515			The Phantom- The Witch Queens Prophecy Part-II		
516			The Criminal Genius		
517			The Coal Mafia		
518			Secrets Of The Glass Castle Part-I		
519			Secrets Of The Glass Castle Part-II		
520			The Dreadful Land Of Kula Ku Part-I		
521			The Dreadful Land Of Kula Ku Part-II	June 24, 1984	
522			The Dreadful Land Of Kula Ku Part-III		
523			The Bridge On The River Nandi		
524			The Ancient Cave Of Splendour Part-I		
525			The Ancient Cave Of Splendour Part-II		
526			Escapade In Kalahari		
527			The Sabre Of Law		
528			Tryst With Destiny		
529			The Devils Stooges		
530			The Highway Inn		
531			Assassin Of The Inner Circle		
532			The Greedy Tyrant Part-I		
533			The Greedy Tyrant Part-II		
534			The Greedy Tyrant Part-III		
535			The Fist Of Fate		
536			Journey To The Silver Sands		
537			The Scary Wonderland		
538			The Vain Prince		
539			The Satans Legion		
540			The Clawing Dragon		
541			The Forbidden Land Of Karapura Part-I		
542			The Forbidden Land Of Karapura Part-II		
543			The Forbidden Land Of Karapura Part-III		
544			The Outlaws Haven		
545			The Crime Syndicate Of Arjangarh		
546			Mings Deadly Trap		
547			The Frozen Death		
548			The Phantoms Verdict Part-I		
549			The Phantoms Verdict Part-II		
550			Night Visitors From The Sky		
551			The Spell Of Horror		
552			The Big Three Of Kanakpur		
553			In The Demons Clutches		
554			Witch Of The Misty Mountains		
555			The Electronic Devil		
556			The Surge Of Evil		
557			The Avenging Lizardmen		
558			The Web Of Deceit		
559			The Haunted Mansion		
560			The Queen Of Darkness		
561			The Weird Wills		
562			The Sacred Black Pearls		
563			The Ghastly Noose		
564			The Slave Runners		
565			Outlaws At Sea		
566			Vigil Of The Ghost Part-I		
567			Vigil Of The Ghost Part-II		
568			Vigil Of The Ghost Part-III		
569			Expedition on Cromag		
570			The Sword Of Honour		
571			The Predator Star		
572			Enigmas Of Crime		
573			The Missing Treasury Of Tega		
574			A Crime Empire		
575			The Massacre At Sitapur		
576			The Three Million Jewel Robbery		
577			The Invisible Thief	July 21, 1985	
578			The Gold Fetters Part-I		
579			The Gold Fetters Part-II		
580			The Witches Abode		
581			Queen Sheebas Necklace Part-I		
582			Queen Sheebas Necklace Part-II		
583			Queen Sheebas Necklace Part-III		
584			The Ill-Fated Outlaws		
585			The Weird Bank Robberies		
586			Massacre In The Jungle		
587			The Claws Of Treachery		
588			The Trail Of The Golden Flower		
589			The Strange Cloud Ship		
590			The Steel Grip		
591			Curse Of The Kimberly Diamonds Part-I		
592			Curse Of The Kimberly Diamonds Part-II		
593			Visitors From The Future		
594			The Ghosts Fury		
595			The Death Knell		
596			The Missing Link		
597		Bahadur	The Sweet Revenge		
598			The Evil Genius Part-I		
599			The Evil Genius Part-II		
600			Monarchs Of The Jungle Part-I		
601			Monarchs Of The Jungle Part-II		
602			The Hypnotic Gem		
603			The Vindictive Ghost	January 19, 1986	
604			The Greedy Traitors		
605		Bahadur	The Growing Spectre		
606			The Ghosts Rancour		
607			The Scheming Sharks		
608			The Fearless Commander Part-I		
609			The Fearless Commander Part-II		
610			The Hideous Underworld		
611		Bahadur	The Tantalizing Killer		
612			The Den Of Crime		
613			The House Of Horrors		
614			The Missing Trophy		
615			The Magic Spells Part-I		
616			The Magic Spells Part-II		
617			The Third Phantoms Bride Part-I		
618			The Third Phantoms Bride Part-II		
619			The Dragour From Vega-3		
620			The Alluring Beach		
621			The Vengeful Wizard		
622	23_22	Bahadur	The Vortex Of Crime		
623			Secret Of The Whispering Grove Part-I		
624			Secret Of The Whispering Grove Part-II		
625			The Embittered Princess		
626			The Gold Hunting Alien		
627			The Shrouded Mystery		
628			The Vindictive War Deity		
629			The Killer Breed Part-I		
630			The Killer Breed Part-II		
631		Bahadur	The Mask Of Decption		
632			The Trials Of Valour Part-I		
633			The Trials Of Valour Part-II		
634			The Eluding Traitor		
635			The Sparks Of Betrayal Part-I		
636			The Sparks Of Betrayal Part-II		
637			The Sparks Of Betrayal Part-III		
638	23_38	Bahadur	Curse Of The Guarding Spirits		
639			The Conspring Crime Baron		
640			The Noose Of Guilt Part-I		
641			The Noose Of Guilt Part-II		
642			The Testing Challenge	October 19, 1986	
643			Giant Noog - The Tyrant Part-I		
644			Giant Noog - The Tyrant Part-II		
645		Bahadur	The Whispering Shadows	November 9, 1986	
646			The Strange Banquet		
647			Magnons Glorious Reign Part-I		
648			Magnons Glorious Reign Part-II		
649		Bahadur	The Masked Princess		
650			The Ill-Fated Voyage Part-I		
651			The Ill-Fated Voyage Part-II		
652			Mystery Of The Moon Island		
653			The Captive Princess		
654			The Island Of No Return		
655			The Snares Of Fortune		
656			The Deadly Viper		
657		Bahadur	The Price Of Revenge		
658			Challenge of the Hijackers	February 8, 1987	
659			The Maddening Mystery		
660			Legend Of The Massau Deity		
661			A Tale of Vendetta	March 1, 1987	
662			The Sacred Talisman	March 8, 1987	
663	24_11	Bahadur	The Dictates Of Destiny		
664			The Maze Of Hurdles		
665			Scandal From The Grave		
666			The Legendary Heroes		
667			The Sinister Bait	April 12, 1987	
668			The Midnight Heist		
669			The Abominable Deal		
670			Revenge Of The Headhunters	May 3, 1987	
671			The Doomed Dictator		
672			The Vicious Intruders		
673			The Lost City Of Jewels Part-I		
674			The Lost City Of Jewels Part-II		
675			Mystery Of The Haunted Castle		
676			Treachery At Sea		
677			Mysterious Lady Of The Lake Part-I		
678			Mysterious Lady Of The Lake Part-II		
679			Mysterious Lady Of The Lake Part-III		
680			The Inner Curse		
681			The Headless Figure Part-I		
682			The Headless Figure Part-II		
683	24_31	Bahadur	The Seeds Of Poison		
684			The Heroic Dynasty		
685			The Killers Den		
686			The Dismal Mission		
687			The Guilty Meddler		
688			The Forbidden Beach		
689		Bahadur	The Preying Ravens		
690			The Hostile Giant		
691			The Conspiring Outlaw		
692			Beyond The River Of Fire	October 4, 1987	
693			The Childwoman		
694			The Secret Crime Ring		
695			The Dodging Villain		
696			The Cursed City		
697			Encounter With Space Creatures		
698			The Planned Accident Part-I		
699			The Planned Accident Part-II		
700		Bahadur	The Brewing Treachery		
701			Curse Of The Sacred Image		
702			The Stalking Executioner		
703			Return Of The Dead Geniuses		
704			Spell Of The Enchantress		
705			Journey To The Emerald Island Part-I		
706			Journey To The Emerald Island Part-II		
707		Bahadur	The Call Of The Valley		
708			The Captive Enchantress		
709			The Eye Witness		
710			The Alien Conquerors		
711			The Innocent Victims		
712			The Masked Avenger Part-I		
713			The Masked Avenger Part-II		
714			The Masked Avenger Part-III		
715		Bahadur	The Fire Of Vengeance		
716			The Indomitable Saviour		
717			Escapade In The Jungle	March 27, 1988	
718			The Undersea Killer Monster Part-I		
719			The Undersea Killer Monster Part-II		
720			The Cult Of Assassins		
721		Bahadur	The Savage Outlaws		
722			Raiders Of Amaland Part-I		
723			Raiders Of Amaland Part-II		
724			Prisoner In The Tower		
725			The Cunning Conjurer		
726			The Conspiring Witchmen		
727			The Victims Of Tyranny		
728			The Cave Of Evil		
729			The Dangerous Adversary		
730		Bahadur	The Calunge Beach		
731			The Snake Goddess Part-I		
732			The Snake Goddess Part-II		
733			The Killer Androids		
734			Claws Of The Killer Part-I		
735			Claws Of The Killer Part-II		
736			The Maze Of Deceit		
737	25_33	Bahadur	The Clutches Of Greed		
738			The Strange Contest		
739			The Mystery Raiders		
740			The Captive Sleuths		
741			The Cursed Emeralds		
742			The Ghosts Verdict Part-I		
743			The Ghosts Verdict Part-II		
744			The Ghosts Verdict Part-III		
745		Bahadur	The Dreaded Fugitive		
746			Devils In Disguise		
747			The Enemy Agent		
748			Ambush At Sea Part-I		
749			Ambush At Sea Part-II		
750			The Lost Continent		
751			Legend Of The Flying Horse Part-I		
752			Legend Of The Flying Horse Part-II		
753			Legend Of The Flying Horse Part-III		
754		Bahadur	The Prowling Wolves		
755			The Deadly Queen Mesala		
756			The Test Of Fire		
757			The Mysterious Couple Part-I		
758			The Mysterious Couple Part-II		
759			The Mysterious Couple Part-III		
760			The Death Potion		
761			Sting Of The Viper Part-I		
762			Sting Of The Viper Part-II		
763			The Savage Mercenary		
764		Bahadur	The Innocent Hostages		
765			The Alien Monsters		
766			The Giant Raptor Part-I		
767			The Giant Raptor Part-II		
768			The Mistaken Identity		
769			The Wizards Curse Part-I		
770			The Wizards Curse Part-II		
771			The Bonded Slaves		
772			The Hundred Islands		
773			The Saviours Wrath		
774		Bahadur	The Death Duel		
775			The Cunning Scorpion		
776			The Gigantic Beast		
777			The Dreaded Island Part-I		
778			The Dreaded Island Part-II		
779			The Scheming Despot		
780			The Satanic Grip		
781	26_25	Phantom	The Chivalrous Protector		
782	26_26	Dara	The Drug Barons		
783	26_27	Garth	The Eluding Adversaries		
784	26_28	Bahadur	The Raging Evil		
785			The Foiled Coup		
786	26_30	Bahadur	The Haunted Fort		
787	26_31	Mandrake	The Framed Innocent		
788			The Deadly Intrigue		
789	26_33	Phantom	Mystery Of The Black Box		
790	26_34	Dara	The Veiled Secret		
791	26_35	Bahadur	The Bank Heist		
792			Mystery Of The Singing Rocks		
793	26_37	Phantom	The Fearless Avenger		
794	26_38	Bahadur	The Ghastly Encounter		
795			The Mysterious Foe		
796			The Lurking Conspirator		
797			The Deadly Formula		
798	27_01	Bahadur	The Fire Of Revenge		
799			The Hired Assassin		
800			Sparks Of Treason		
801	27_04	Phantom	The Grip Of Treachery		
802	27_05	Bahadur	The Snake Charmers Bait		
803			The Devil Cult		
804			The Secret Invention		
805	27_08	Dara	The Jaws Of Treachery		
