= Amar Chitra Katha =

Indian comic book publishing company

Amar Chitra Katha (ACK Comics)
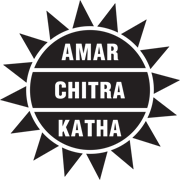
- Official logo of Amar Chitra Katha (ACK)
- Parent company: Amar Chitra Katha Pvt. Ltd.
- Status: Active
- Predecessor: India Book House
- Founded: 1967; 59 years ago
- Founder: Anant Pai
- Country of origin: India
- Headquarters location: Mumbai, Maharashtra, India
- Key people: Aman Srivastava (CEO); Reena I Puri (Editor-in-Chief)
- Publication types: Comics; Magazines; Books / List of Amar Chitra Katha comics
- Fiction genres: Mythology; History; Folktales; Literature
- Official website: www.amarchitrakatha.com

Amar Chitra Katha (ACK Comics) is an Indian comic book publisher, based in Mumbai, India. The company was founded in 1967 by Anant Pai. Most of its comics are based on religious legends and epics, historical figures and biographies, folktales and cultural stories.

== Creation and influence ==
The comic series was started by Anant Pai in an attempt to teach Indian children about their cultural heritage. He was shocked that Indian students could answer questions on Greek and Roman mythology, but were ignorant of their own history, mythology and folklore. It so happened that a quiz contest aired on Doordarshan in February 1967, in which participants could easily answer questions pertaining to Greek mythology, but were unable to reply to the question "In the Ramayana, who was Rama's mother?".

Originally from Karkala, Karnataka, Anant Pai left his position at Indrajal Comics in 1967 to pursue a new mission of creating comics that would serve as educational tools to help Indian children connect with their cultural roots. Pai is referred to as the “Father of Indian Comics” by Parveen and Rajesh in their article Amar Chitra Katha Comics in Feminist Perspective, who described his mission as giving readers a “route to their roots.” Anant Pai started Amar Chitra Katha (ACK) by buying the rights for 10 American fairy tales such as Red Riding Hood, Snow White and Seven Dwarfs, Jack and the Beanstalk and Pinocchio. The first Indian comic done and released in ACK was Krishna (serial number #11).

The above story is the version reported by ACK itself. However, Outlook magazine presents a contradicting view, stating that the idea and proposal for Amar Chitra Katha was made by a Bangalore book salesman called G.K. Ananthram which led to the first Amar Chitra Katha comics being produced in 1965—in Kannada, not English. "The English ACK titles begin from number eleven because the first ten were in Kannada," clarifies Ananthram. Kannada is a Dravidian language spoken in Karnataka, India. To Ananthram's satisfaction, the 1965 Kannada ACK venture was a great commercial success which led to Mirchandani in the head office in Mumbai pursuing the Amar Chitra Katha idea in English. "They brought in Anant Pai" says Ananthram. "And he built a wonderful team and a great brand." By the late 1970s, it was selling 5 million copies a year and had a peak circulation of about 700,000 a month. India Book House started to bring out at least one comic book a month by 1975, and sometimes as many as three. While Pai initially wrote the first few stories himself, he soon hired a core team of writers and editors, which included Subba Rao. Writers like Margie Sastry, Debrani Mitra and C.R Sharma also joined the creative team of Amar Chitra Katha, with Anant Pai taking on the role of editor and co-writer on most scripts. The illustrators were Ram Waeerkar, who illustrated the first issue of Amar Chitra Katha, Krishna, Dilip Kadam, C. M. Vitankar, Pratap Mullick and Yusuf Lien a.k.a. Yusuf Bangalorewala.

On 1 October 2025, ACK's main warehouse, located in Bhiwandi, burned for four days and resulted in the destruction of over 600,000 units of inventory, including ACK and Tinkle comics, special edition box sets, and merchandise. It happened during the festival month of 2025. The blaze consumed lakhs of original positives, which are the hand-drawn line-art on transparent film, for approximately 200 of the earliest ACK comic titles. These original hard copies of the positives were never auctioned, so we can never know their market value. But they have been digitally archived. The fire consumed original artwork for classics like Krishna, Rama, The Pandava Princes, Savitri, Prithviraj Chauhan, and Shivaji Maharaj, marking the permanent loss of a significant part of the company's history as well as post-independence Indian history. Despite the setback, the company plans to expand its business to apparel, board books, licensing and digital subscriptions, chapter books and figurines on their online portals.

In May 2026, Aman Srivastava replaced Preeti Vyas as CEO of Amar Chitra Katha.

== Cultural Impact and Scholarly Criticism ==
By 1995, Amar Chitra Katha had published over 500 titles, and prided itself on its scope and completeness on Indian history and cultural heritage.

Titles are sold not only as individual issues but also as groupings. "Stories from the Ramayana" is one such grouping of titles that were originally published separately; in it nine titles relating to the Ramayana are compiled, with their literary source material coming from diverse sources. "The Mahabharata in 60 Volumes" in contrast is a pre-planned volume; Pritchett notes the series' lofty dialogue and its skirting of certain ethical issues regarding incidents in the Mahabharata. "The Epic of New India" is another series; it narrates an Indian nationalist view of British rule and the independence movement, with heroic, communally united Indians fighting against evil, caricatured British colonialists; in all Amar Chitra Katha comics set in the colonial era, communal conflict is whitewashed. Amar Chitra Katha's selection of work on modern history was described by Pritchett (1995) as "invidiously selective"; many of the most notable independence activists (especially women and Muslims) had not received issues up to that point, while Sikh history was given far more extensive coverage. Pritchett states Amar Chitra seeks to engage in "cosmic integration" with Krishna as its chosen deity and all other non-human species (Vanara, Rakshasa, Nāga, etc.) subsumed into human forms.

American scholar Jeremy Stoll has noted that, "As the earliest indigenous comic books in India, the Amar Chitra Katha series set a strong precedent, one which has dictated comics content and style for decades since". Furthermore, he noted the series' promotion of "nationalism", and lamented that "as the most widely published and read Indian comics, books from this series are the ones that most scholars [of Indian comics] have focused upon, to the detriment of understanding the wider context of India's comics, storytelling, and visual cultures".

The stories have often been criticised in the past as distorted depictions of history. Another criticism is that comic books, by their very nature, do not reflect the richness and complexity of the oral tradition of Indian mythology in which multiple versions of a story can co-exist simultaneously.

== Films and television ==
The following films were produced by Amar Chitra Katha under ACK Animation Studios banner

Year	Title	Director	Notes
2010	Amar Chitra Katha	Saptharishi Ghosh	Animated television series, aired on Cartoon Network India and later ZeeQ.
2011	Tripura – The Three Cities of Maya	Chetan Sharma	TV movie Co-produced with Animagic
2012	Sons of Ram	Kushal Ruia	Co-produced with Maya Digital Studios and Cartoon Network India.
2012	Shambu and the Man-eater	Santosh Palav, Kushal Ruia	Short animation film.
2012	Suppandi Suppandi! The Animated Series	Kushal Ruia	Animated television series, aired on Cartoon Network India.

== Ownership of Amar Chitra Katha Private Limited ==
- June 2010, Elephant Capital(Dabur) acquired ~30% of AKCPL Elephant Capital buys stake in Amar Chitra Katha for Rs 22 cr
- April 2011, Future Group acquired ~26% of AKCPL and picked up 30% from Elephant Capital in July 2011 Kishore Biyani-led Future Group to take Amar Chitra Katha digital
- January 2022, Future Group acquired 68.72% of ACKPL via their subsidiary Future Consumer Limited Amar Chitra Katha becomes Future group subsidiary post conversion of debentures into equity
- May 2022, Future Group sold 18.58% of ACKPL to Rana Daggubati and Spirit Media and ceased to be the majority shareholder.Future Group to sell 18.6 pc stake in Amar Chitra Katha for Rs 13.62 crore

== See also ==
- List of Amar Chitra Katha comics for a comprehensive listing of all titles released to date.
