= Anant Pai =

Indian comics artist (1929–2011)

- Pai in 2005
- Born: 17 September 1929; Karkala, Madras Presidency, British India (now in Karnataka, India)
- Died: 24 February 2011 (aged 81); Mumbai, Maharashtra, India
- Other names: Uncle Pai; Walt Disney of India
- Education: Institute of Chemical Technology (Formerly UDCT)
- Known for: Founding Amar Chitra Katha
- Spouse: Lalita Pai (m. 1961)

Anant Pai (17 September 1929 – 24 February 2011), popularly known as Uncle Pai, was an Indian educationalist and a pioneer in Indian comics. He is most famous as the creator of two comic book series viz. Amar Chitra Katha, which retold traditional Indian folk tales, mythological stories, and biographies of historical characters; and Tinkle, a children's anthology.

== Early life and education ==
Pai was born in Karkala, in what was the erstwhile Madras Presidency of British India on 17 September 1929 to a Konkani-speaking Goud Saraswat Brahmin couple, Venkataraya and Susheela Pai. He lost both his parents at the age of two. He was then brought up by his maternal grandfather until his death in 1944 after which he moved to Bombay (now Mumbai), where he studied in Orient School, Mahim. He pursued his higher education in chemistry, physics and chemical engineering at the Institute of Chemical Technology (formerly UDCT) and was a dual degree holder from the University of Bombay.

== Professional career ==
Endowed with a passion for publishing and comics, his failed attempt at creating a children's magazine (Manav, 1954) was followed by a career as a junior executive in The Times of India books division, putting him in the thick of affairs when Indrajal Comics, which was famous for publishing comic book series like Mandrake and The Phantom, was launched by the Times Group.

The idea behind starting a comic book series devoted to Indian culture and history came to Pai from a quiz contest aired on Doordarshan in February 1967, in which participants could easily answer questions pertaining to Greek mythology, but were unable to reply to the question "In the Ramayana, who was Rama's mother?"

He left his job at The Times of India the very same year and started Amar Chitra Katha, a comic-book series which retold traditional Indian folk tales, Hindu mythology and biographies of historical persons, with the help of late G. L. Mirchandani of India Book House, when most other publishers from Allied Publishers to Jaico had rejected the concept. He took on the role of writer, editor and publisher. The series went on to become a publishing milestone for the Indian comic book scene, selling over 86 million copies of about 440 titles.

In 1969, Pai founded Rang Rekha Features, India's first comic and cartoon syndicate. In November 1980, he started Tinkle under this syndicate. It is a children's anthology of short stories, jokes and educational articles in comic-book format. Tinkle too replicated the success of Amar Chitra Katha, with the magazine currently in its 669th issue as in June 2017. Pai's involvement with the above, and the personal rapport he shared with his readers earned him the title "Uncle Pai". In 1989, again through this syndicate, Pai launched Chimpu Comics, which included his own works like Ramu and Shamu, Kapish, Little Raji and Fact Fantasy. This venture failed to repeat the success of Amar Chitra Katha and Tinkle and eventually its publication was stopped. Pai remained managing director of Rang Rekha Features until 2000, when he sold it to a Hyderabad-based animation studio named Color Chips.

Besides comics, Pai was also a specialist in personality development. He founded the Partha Institute of Personality Development in August 1978, which conducted personality development classes through correspondence for children and teenagers.

== Works ==
=== Comics ===
Under Rang Rekha Features, Pai created a large number of comic strips such as Ramu and Shamu, Kapish, Little Raji, and Rekha along with one-off short stories in comic format. Most of these continue to appear in newspapers and magazines. He also created educational strips such as Fact Fantasy, Funland and Funtime.

=== Video ===
Pai has written and produced two video films, Ekam Sat (the Vedic Concept of God) and The Secret of Success, in both English and Hindi.

=== Miscellaneous ===
Pai's other works include a number of books on personality development for children and teenagers such as How To Develop Self-confidence How to Achieve Success, How To Develop A Super Memory and audio books like certain titles of Amar Chitra Katha in audio book format and Storytime with Uncle Pai, where he plays the role of narrator-storyteller.

== Awards and recognitions ==
- Lifetime Achievement Award – at the First Indian Comic Convention, New Delhi on 19 Feb 2011 (six days before his death) was given by Pran, Creator of Chacha Chaudhury
- Karpoorchand Puraskar of Uttar Pradesh Bal Kalyan Sansthan (1994)
- Yudhvir Memorial Award in Hyderabad (1996)
- Maharashtra Rajya Hindi Sahitya Academy Award (1996)
- Dr. T. M. A. Pai Memorial Award in Manipal (1997)
- University of Bombay Department of Chemical Technology's Distinguished Alumnus Award (1999)
- Millennium Konkani Sammelan Award, Illinois, USA (2000)
- Raja Rammohan Roy Library Foundation's Award (2001)
- Priyadarshni Academy Award (2002)
- Vishwa Saraswat Sammaan (2003)

=== Google Doodle ===
Google's international and India search pages honoured Pai with a comic-style doodle of him on 17 September 2011, the 82nd birth anniversary of Pai. The doodle featured Pai sitting in his office, surrounded by shelves full of his own creations. Two such pictures, one in which Uncle Pai is sitting and the other in which he is standing, form the doodle, with the writing of Google connecting the two.

=== Amar Chitra Katha Biography ===
On 18 February 2012, ACK Media, a Mumbai-based edutainment company which had been managing Amar Chitra Katha and Tinkle since 2007, released an Amar Chitra Katha title on Anant Pai, which was scripted by Gayathri Chandrasekaran, assistant editor of Tinkle, and illustrated by Dilip Kadam, who had illustrated many of Amar Chitra Katha's most famous titles.

== Personal life ==
In 1961, at the age of 31, Pai married Lalita, who was 20 at the time. She later died in 2015 four years after his own demise in 2011. The couple was childless. He resided in an apartment in Prabhadevi, Mumbai.

== Death ==
Anant Pai died of a heart attack on the evening of 24 February 2011. He had been recovering from hip surgery which was necessitated following his falling down from the stairs a week prior to his death. His last rites were performed later that night at the Shivaji Park crematorium, Mumbai.
