= Milliken (surname) =

Milliken is a surname. Notable people with the surname include:

- Angie Milliken, Australian actress
- Benjamin Milliken, founder of Ellsworth, Maine and American Loyalist
- Benjamin Milliken II, United Empire Loyalist, Major in York Militia during 1837 Upper Canada Rebellion
- Bob Milliken, American baseball pitcher
- Carl E. Milliken, Republican and Progressive Party politician and early figure in the motion picture industry
- Isaac Lawrence Milliken, mayor of Chicago from 1854 to 1855
- James Milliken (academic administrator) (born 1957), chancellor of the University of Texas System
- James B. Milliken (judge), American judge
- James T. Milliken (1882–1952), American businessman and Michigan State Senator
- James W. Milliken (1848–1908), American businessman, mayor, and Michigan State Senator
- Jeanne Milliken (born 1962), American politician and lobbyist
- Jessie Milliken (1877–1951), American botanist
- Mary Sue Milliken, American chef and restauranteur
- Nicholas Milliken, Canadian politician
- Nina Milliken, American politician
- Norman Milliken, founder of Milliken, Ontario and American Loyalist
- Peter Milliken, former Speaker of the House of Commons of Canada
- Roger Milliken, textile heir
- Seth L. Milliken, Maine politician
- William Milliken (1922–2019), Michigan Governor
- William H. Milliken Jr., Pennsylvania politician
- William F. Milliken Jr., aircraft and automotive engineer

== See also ==
- Millikan (disambiguation)
- Milken (disambiguation)
- Millikin (disambiguation)
