= Mullick =

Mullick, Mulick or Mullik is primarily a native Bengali surname. Notable people with the surname include:

- Amar Mullick (1899–1972), Indian actor and director
- Basanta Mullick (1868–1931), Indian civil servant and judge
- Jagdish Tukaram Mulik, Indian politician and member of the Bharatiya Janata Party
- Jyotipriyo Mullick, Indian politician of West Bengal
- Kanchan Mullick, Bengali film and television actor
- Koel Mallick (born 1982), Indian film actress who appears in Bengali films
- Kumud Ranjan Mullick (1883–1970), Bengali writer and poet
- Milind Mulick, Indian watercolour painter, teacher and author
- Mukunda Behari Mullick (1888–1974), Indian lawyer, reformer, professor, politician
- Mushaal Mullick, wife of separatist leader Yasin Malik who advocates separation of Kashmir from India
- Nirvan Mullick (born 1975), Los Angeles-based filmmaker, writer, speaker, animator, founder of the Imagination Foundation
- Nodu Mullick, sitar maker from India
- Pankaj Kumar Mullick, (1905–1978), Indian Bengali music director, pioneer of film music in Bengali cinema and Hindi cinema
- Prafulla Mullick (1919–1974), Indian swimmer
- Pratap Mullick, Indian illustrator who worked for the Indian comic book series Amar Chitra Katha
- Pravanjan Mullick (born 1976), Indian first class cricketer for Odisha
- Rajendra Mullick (1819–1887), Indian art lover and philanthropist
- Ranjit Mallick (born 1944), Indian actor who works mainly in Bengali cinema
- Robert Mulick (born 1979), Canadian former professional ice hockey defenceman
- Shujaul Mulik, elected to represent Kunar Province in Afghanistan's Wolesi Jirga in 2005
- SP Mullick, Indian cricketer, played 33 first-class matches between 1960 and 1971 for Kerala
- Subodh Chandra Mullick (1879–1920), Bengali Indian industrialist, philanthropist and nationalist
- Surabuddin Mullick, Indian footballer who is currently playing for Mohun Bagan in the I-League as a Midfielder

== See also ==
- Raja SC Mullick Road traverses mainly through Jadavpur and then the inner parts of south Kolkata and ends at Garia, where it meets the Netaji Subash Chandra Bose Road
- Mullica (disambiguation)
- Mulock (disambiguation)
- Mulliken (disambiguation)
