= Star Comics IBH =

Star Comics was an Indian comic line published by IBH (India Book House) popular during the 1970s and 1980s. Because the publication had few original characters, it relied heavily upon the license to print comics of popular international characters like Superman, Batman, and James Bond. They also distributed Tarzan and Korak (Tarzan's son) comics published by Kiran Comics under license from Edgar Rice Burroughs Inc. Star Comics was published twice a month for a total of 24 issues every year.

== List of Characters ==
Character	Parent Company	Creator
Superman	DC Comics, USA	Jerry Siegel and Joe Shuster
Batman	DC Comics, USA	Bob Kane and Bill Finger
James Bond		Ian Fleming
Laurel and Hardy	Larry Harmon Pictures Corporation	Stan Laurel and Oliver Hardy
Supremo	Star Comics IBH	Pammi Bakshi and Pratap Mullick
