= Milken =

Milken may refer to:

- Michael Milken (born 1946), American financier and philanthropist, pleaded guilty in 1990 to U.S. securities law violation and pardoned by President Trump in 2020
- Lowell Milken (born 1948), American businessman, philanthropist, brother of Michael
- Milken Institute
- Milken Institute School of Public Health
- Milken Community Schools

== See also ==
- Millikan (disambiguation)
- Milliken (disambiguation)
- Millikin (disambiguation)
