= List of Nagraj's comics =

Over the years Raj Comics has published over 150 comics of Nagraj. Here is a list of all the comics featuring character Nagraj in them.

== Nagraj's Solo Comic Issues ==
Nagraj has been presented in many crossover issues. Raj Comics has published the following titles as Nagraj's solo issues:

Comic Titles	Comic Titles in English
01-Nagraj	Nagraj
02-Nagraj Ki Kabr	Nagraj's Grave
03-Nagraj ka Badla	Nagraj's Revenge
04-Hong Kong Yatra	Hong Kong Trip
05-Nagraj aur Shango	Nagraj and Shango
06-Khooni Khoj	Murderous Expedition
07-Khooni Yatra	Murderous Voyage
08-Nagraj ka Insaf	Nagraj's Justice
09-Khooni Jung	Murderous battle
10-Pralayankari Nagraj	Nagraj the Destroyer
11-Khooni Kabeela	Murderous Tribe
12-Cobraghati	Valley of Cobra
13-Bachhon ke Dushman	Children's Enemies
14-Pralayankari Mani	Destroyer Gem
15-Nagraj aur Shankar Shehanshah	Nagraj and Shankar Shehanshah
16-Nagraj ka Dushman	Nagraj's Foe
17-Ichchhadhari Nagraj	Shape-Shifting Nagraj
18-Kaaldoot	Kaaldoot
19-Jadugar Shakoora	Shakoora the Magician
20-Bauna Shaitan	Dwarf Satan
21-Tajmahal ki Chori	Tajmahal's Theft
22-Laal Maut	Red Death
23-Kabooki ka Khajana	Kabooki's Treasure
24-Thodanga	Thodanga
25-Toofan Ju	Storm Ju
26-Jadu ka Shehanshah	Emperor of Magic
27-Ajgar ka Toofan	Storm of Python
Nagraj ka Safar (Special Issue)	Nagraj's Journey
28-Bakora ka Jaadu	Bakora's Magic
29-Piramidon ki Rani	Queen of Pyramids
30-Mr 420	Mr 420 (Fraud)
31-Thodanga ki Maut	Thodanga's Death
32-Bem Bem Bigelo	Bem Bem Bigelo
33-Nagina ka Jaal	Nagina's Trap
34-Nagina	Nagina
35-Phir aaya Nagdant	Nagdant Returns
36-Miss Killer	Miss Killer
37-Tutenatu	Tutenatu
38-Adrishya Hatyara	Invisible Killer
39-Kanja	Kanja
40-Paapraj	Sin Master
41-Vijeta Nagraj	Victorious Nagraj
42-Visarpi ki Shaadi	Visarpi's Marriage
43-Shakura ka Chakravyuh	Shakura's Labyrinth (Circle of Deceit)
44-Nagraj ka Ant	Nagraj's Termination
45-Zehar	Poison
46-Nagpasha	Nagpasha
47-Khazana	Treasure
48-Crime King	Crime King
49-Vishkanya	Venom-Girl
50-Snake Park	Snake Park
51-Naagin	Snake (Female)
52-Ichchhadhari	Ichchhadhari
53-Kenchuli	Snake Skin
54-Zehreeley	Poisonous
55-Bambi	Snake's Nest
56-Sapera	Snake Charmer
57-Fann	Snake Hood
58-Vish-Amrit	Venom-Elixir (Of Life)
59-Sammohan	Hypnosis
60-Raj ka Raj	Raj's Reign
61-Mrityudand	Death Sentence
62-Nagdweep	Snake Island
63-Trifana	Tri-(Snake)Hooded
64-Mahayuddh	Ultimate War
65-Agraj	Elder Brother
66-Nagraj ka Kahar	Nagraj's Havoc
67-Tandav	Dance of Destruction
68-Aatank	Terror
69-Dushman Nagraj	Enemy Nagraj
70-Shaktiheen Nagraj	Powerless Nagraj
71-Nahi Bachega Nagraj	Nagraj Won't Survive
72-Kaalchakra	Death Wheel
73-Kundli	Snake Loop
74-Elan-e-jung	The Declaration Of War
75-Kaali Maut	Black Death
76-Nagraj America Mein	Nagraj In America
77-Atankwadi Nagraj	Terrorist Nagraj
78-Nagraj aur Dracula	Nagraj and Dracula
79-Vish-heen Nagraj	Venomless Nagraj
80-Ichchhadhari Chor	Ichchhadhari Thief
81-Khalnayak Nagraj	Villain Nagraj
82-Rakshak Nagraj	Protector Nagraj
83-Lava	Lava
84-Vinaash-leela	Tale Of Destruction
85-Pagal Nagraj	Mad Nagraj
86-Maseeha	Messiah
87-Chhota Nagraj	Little Nagraj
88-So Ja Nagraj	Go To Sleep Nagraj
89-Sheshnag	Sheshnag
90-Bhanumati ka Pitara	Bhanumati's Box
91-Flemina	Flemina
92-Phoonkar	(Snake's) Hiss
93-Hari maut	Green Death
94-Zehreela Barood	Poisonous Gun Powder
95-Mamber	Mamber
96-Numero Uno	Number one
97-Operation Surgery	Operation surgery
98-Mission Critical	Mission Critical
99-Teen Sikke	Three Coins
100-Jung Maut Tak	Battle Until Death
101-Under Arrest	Under Arrest
102-Omertà	Omertà
103-Aankh Michouli	Hide and Seek
104-Panchwa Shikar	Fifth Target
105-26/11	26/11
106-Nagraj Ke Baad	After Nagraj
107-Fuel	Fuel
108-Vinom	Venom
109-Halla Bol	Attack! (Warcry)
110-Gehri Chaal	Dark Conspiracy
111-Level Zero	Level Zero
112-Ronin	Ronin (Samurai with no Master)
113-Kamikaze	Kamikaze (The Suicide attackers)
114-Tomo	Tomo (The Mystic Katana)
115-Shikata Ga Nai	Nothing can be done
116-Ambreesh	Sky-God
117-Aadamkhor	Maneater
118-Nagraj Hai Na	Nagraj Is There
119-Kyon Hai Nagraj	Why Is Nagraj?
120-Infected	Infected
121-I-Spy	I-Spy
122-Mrityujivi	Death Conquerers
123-Aadam	Barbarian
124-Order Of Babel	Order Of Babel
125-New World Order	New World Order
126-Kaal Karal	Dreadful Death
127-Maqbara	Mausoleum
128-Takshak	Snake
129-World War	World War
130-Veergati	Veergati
131-Kshatipurti	Kshatipurti
132-Maut ka Baazigar	Maut ka Baazigar

== Nagraj's Multistarrer Comics list in Sequence Order ==
Raj Comics has published a number of multistarrer titles on Nagraj.

Special Issue No.	Era	Hindi Comic Title	English Comic Title	Series Type	Status
16	1987–2000	Nagraj aur Super Commando Dhruva	Nagraj and Super Commando Dhruva	2 in 1 (Nagraj, Super Commando Dhruva)	Published
30	1987–2000	Fighter Toads	Fighter Toads	Multistarrer (Nagraj, Dhruva, Fighter Toads)	Published
46	1987–2000	Rajnagar Ki Tabahi	Rajnagar's Destruction	2 in 1 (Nagraj, Super Commando Dhruva)	Published
51	1987–2000	Pralay	Doom's Day	2 in 1 (Nagraj, Super Commando Dhruva)	Published
52	1987–2000	Vinaash	Destruction	2 in 1 (Nagraj, Super Commando Dhruva)	Published
56	1987–2000	Tanashah	Dictator	2 in 1 (Nagraj, Super Commando Dhruva)	Published
60	1987–2000	Nishachar	Night Crawlers	2 in 1 (Super Commando Dhruva, Doga)	Published
61	1987–2000	Kaliyug	Kaliyug	2 in 1 (Nagraj, Super Commando Dhruva)	Published
65	1987–2000	Kohraam	Chaos	Multistarrer	Published
71	2001–2010	Zalzala	Earthquake	Multistarrer	Published
72	2001–2010	Aatank	Terror	2 in 1 (Nagraj, Super Commando Dhruva)	Published
73	2001–2010	Dushman Nagraj	Enemy Nagraj	2 in 1 (Nagraj, Super Commando Dhruva)	Published
76	2001–2010	Sangraam	War	2 in 1 (Nagraj, Super Commando Dhruva)	Published
79	2001–2010	Vidhwans	Havoc	Multistarrer	Published
80	2001–2010	Parkaale	Death from above	Multistarrer	Published
83	2001–2010	Sanhaar	Slaughter	2 in 1 (Nagraj, Super Commando Dhruva)	Published
86	2001–2010	Dracula Ka Hamla	Dracula's Attack	Dracula Series	Published
87	2001–2010	Nagraj aur Drakula	Nagraj and Dracula	Dracula Series	Published
88	2001–2010	Dracula Ka Ant	End of Dracula	Dracula Series	Published
89	2001–2010	Kolahal	Disturbance	Dracula Series	Published
93	2001–2010	Samraat	Emperor	2 in 1 (Nagraj, Super Commando Dhruva)	Published
94	2001–2010	Soudangi	Soudangi	2 in 1 (Nagraj, Super Commando Dhruva)	Published
95	2001–2010	Sarv Shaktimaan	Most Powerful	Multistarrer	Published
100	2001–2010	Chakra	Cycle	Multistarrer	Published
101	2001–2010	Medusa	Medusa	Multistarrer	Published
105	2001–2010	Nagadheesh	King of Snakes	2 in 1 (Nagraj, Super Commando Dhruva)	Published
106	2001–2010	Vartmaan	Present	2 in 1 (Nagraj, Super Commando Dhruva)	Published
107	2001–2010	Flemina	Flemina	Multistarrer	Published
109	2001–2010	Sarvanaash	Total Destruction	2 in 1 (Super Commando Dhruva, Doga)	Published
110	2001–2010	Varan Kand	Taking Affair	Nagayan Series	Published
111	2001–2010	Grahan Kand	Eclipse Affair	Nagayan Series	Published
113	2001–2010	Surma	The Powerful	Nagraj & Parmanu	Published
189	2001–2010	Kayamat	Doom	Nagraj & Parmanu	Published
114	2001–2010	Haran Kand	Kidnapping Affair	Nagayan Series	Published
115	2001–2010	Sharan Kand	Asylum Affair	Nagayan Series	Published
117	2001–2010	Dahen Kand	Pyre Affair	Nagayan Series	Published
119	2001–2010	Rann Kand	Battle Field Affairs	Nagayan Series	Published
120	2001–2010	Samar Kand	Slaughter Affair	Nagayan Series	Published
121	2001–2010	Itee Kand	RIP Affair	Nagayan Series	Published
124	2001–2010	Gehri Chaal	Dark Conspiracy	Multistarrer (Fighter Toads, Nagraj, Dhruva)	Published
125	2001–2010	Level Zero	Level Zero	Multistarrer (Fighter Toads, Nagraj, Dhruva)	Published
126	2001–2010	Avshesh	Avshesh	Multistarrer (Nagraj, Dhruva)	Published
127	2001–2010	Chunauti	Chunauti	Multistarrer (Nagraj, Dhruva)	Published
128	2001–2010	Hedron	Hedron	Multistarrer (Nagraj, Dhruva)	Published
