= Milliken =

Milliken may refer to:

== Places ==
- Milliken, Colorado, a town in the United States
- Milliken, West Virginia, an unincorporated community in the United States
- Milliken, Ontario, a neighbourhood of Toronto, Canada
  - Milliken GO Station, a station in the GO Transit network located in the community
- Milliken Creek (disambiguation)
- Milliken Park railway station, Renfrewshire, Scotland, United Kingdom
- Milliken Airport, Kabwe, Zambia

== People ==
- Milliken (surname)
- Mary Sue Milliken, American chef and restauranteur

== Other ==
- Milliken & Company, one of the world's largest private textile firms
- Milliken v. Bradley, a US Supreme Court decision on desegregation
- Milliken Gallery, a contemporary art gallery in Stockholm

== See also ==
- Millikan (disambiguation)
- Millikin (disambiguation)
