= Milliken District Park =

Municipal park in Toronto, Canada

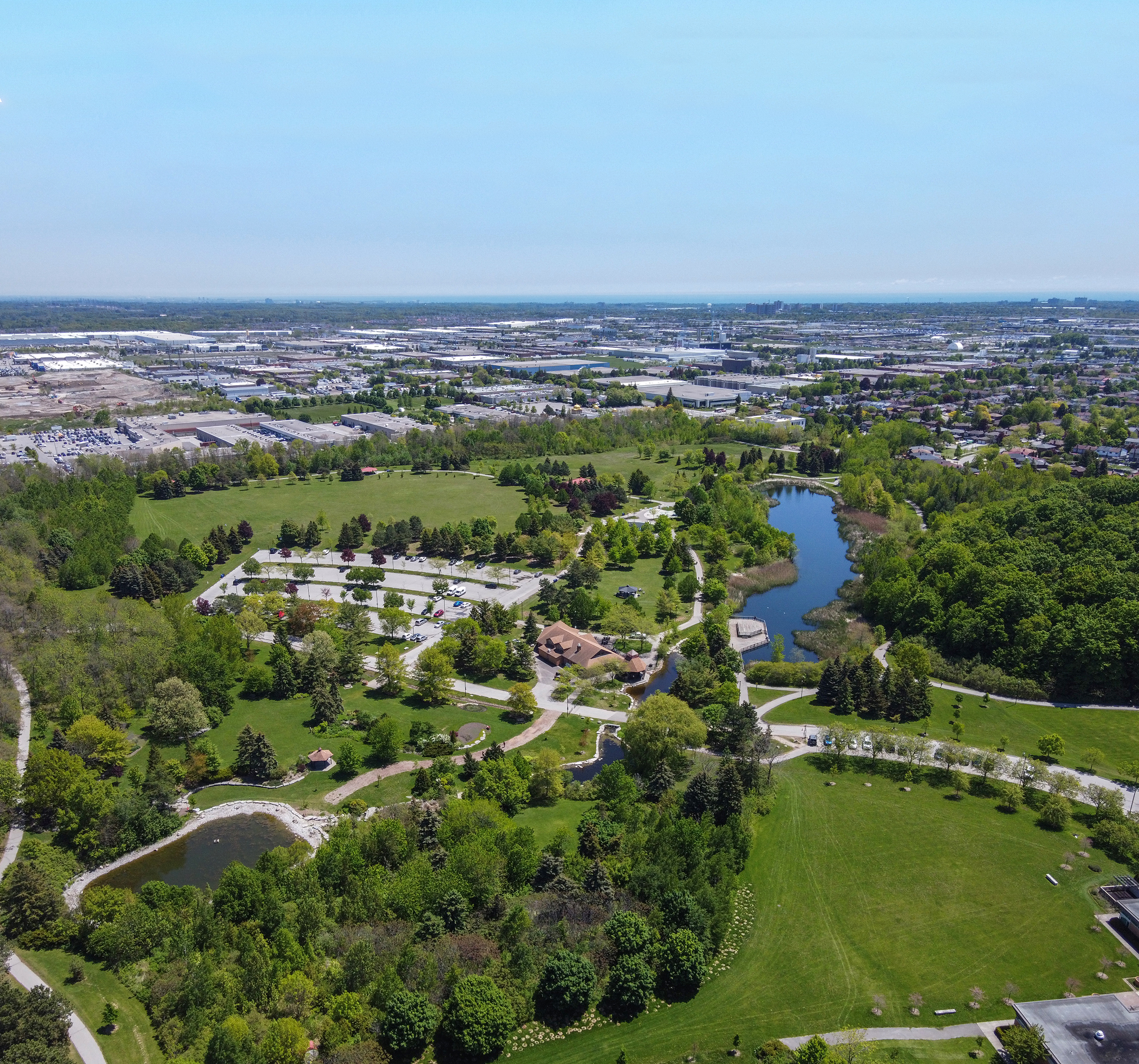
- Aerial view of the park

- Location within Toronto
- Type: Urban wild
- Location: Toronto, Ontario, Canada
- Coordinates: 43°49′45″N 79°16′16″W
- Area: 32 hectares (79 acres)
- Operator: Toronto Parks, Forestry and Recreation Division

Milliken District Park is a park located in the Scarborough area of Toronto, Ontario, Canada.

== Description ==
The park is located in northeast Scarborough and it is named after the community of Milliken. The park occupies 32 hectares (79 acres). There are a total of three playgrounds and a splash pad. The Milliken Park Community Recreation Centre is located at the west side of the park.

=== Events ===
The City of Toronto hosts a fireworks show at the park every Canada Day. However, fireworks were cancelled in 2020 due to the ongoing COVID-19 pandemic. As a result, the event was substituted with virtual celebrations.

At the Milliken Park Community Recreation Centre, there are a variety of drop-in and registered programs that take place for all age groups. Programs offered include visual arts, dance, fitness, youth leadership, sports, and camps.

== History ==
The park is on the area of the former Milliken’s Corners, a hamlet, founded by Norman Milliken, a United Empire Loyalist from New Brunswick, in 1807. It was mostly farmland.

The park officially opened in 1993.

=== Kite Flying Ban ===
Kite flying was a common activity at the park. Approximately 70 kites would fly in the air every weekend.

In August 2010, Toronto banned kite flying at the park because of the kite fighting that occurred, a common activity in Pakistan, Afghanistan, and India that was made popular by the novel The Kite Runner by Khaled Hosseini, an Afghan-American author. The kite fighting battles at the park involved kite flyers cutting strings of other kites by using strings coated with sharp materials.

Due to kite fighters littering kites and sharp strings that were used for fighting, it has hurt wildlife and other users of the park. There were cases of birds getting strangled or losing their legs because of the string cutting off circulation to the limbs. Users of the park were getting scraped by the kites.
