= Millican =

Millican may refer to:

People:

- Millican Dalton, self-styled "Professor of Adventure"
- Arthenia J. Bates Millican, American writer and educator
- Charles N. Millican, founding president of the University of Central Florida
- Daniel Millican, American writer/director
- James Millican, American actor
- Lisa Ann Millican, American kidnapping victim
- Peter Millican, professor of philosophy at Oxford University
- Sarah Millican, English stand-up comedian

Places:

- Millican, Oregon
- Millican, Texas
- Millican Estates, Calgary
- Calgary-Millican

In media:

- Millican (album)
- Millican & Nesbitt

== See also ==
- Millikan (disambiguation)
- Milliken (disambiguation)
- Milligan (disambiguation)
