= Mullikin =

Mullikin is a surname. Notable people with the surname include:

- Anna Mullikin (1893–1975), American mathematician
- Mary Augusta Mullikin (1874–1964), American painter

== See also ==
- Mulliken (disambiguation)
- Millikin (disambiguation)
- Mulligan (surname)
