= Mulock =

Mulock is a surname. Notable people with this surname include:

- Al Mulock (1926–1968), Canadian actor
- Dinah Mulock alias Dinah Craik (1826–1887), English novelist and poet
- George Mulock (1882–1963), British naval officer, Antarctic surveyor and explorer
- Redford Henry Mulock (1886–1961), Canadian flying ace of World War I
- Ron Mulock (1930–2014), Australian politician
- T. J. Mulock (born 1985), Canadian-German professional ice hockey forward
- Tyson Mulock (born 1983), Canadian professional ice hockey centre
- William Mulock (1843–1944), Canadian lawyer, politician, judge and philanthropist
- William Pate Mulock (1897–1954), Canadian politician

== See also ==
- Mulock Glacier, in Antarctica
- Mulock Inlet, re-entrant between Capes Teall and Lankester
- Mulock, Ontario (disambiguation), one of several places in Ontario, Canada
- Sir William Mulock Secondary School, secondary school in Newmarket, Ontario, Canada
