= Mulliken =

Mulliken may refer to:

- Mulliken, Michigan, a village in the United States

People with the surname:

- Bill Mulliken (1939–2014), American Olympic swimmer
- Harry B. Mulliken (1872–1952), American architect and developer
- Robert S. Mulliken (1896–1986), American physicist

== See also ==
- Mullikin, a surname
- Millikan (disambiguation)
