= Supremo (comics) =

Supremo is an Indian comic book character in the series The Adventures of Amitabh Bachchan (in Hindi, किस्से अमिताभ के), published in the 1980s. The series was based on the actor Amitabh Bachchan.

Supremo was created by Pammi Bakshi, editor of Movie magazine, who developed the series for her magazine's publisher, India Book House (IBH), under their imprint Star Comics. In an interview, Pammi Bakshi stated that the name Supremo came about from actor Randhir Kapoor's tag for superstar Bachchan. Bakshi recalled that she roped writer-director Gulzar as consultant, and for the character design, approached Pratap Mullick, then an illustrator for the Amar Chitra Katha comic books. According to the same interview, the series was written mostly by actress Sudha Chopra and freelance writers, with some contributions from readers. The initial comic books in the series, however, credit Gulzar for script. Sudha Chopra is credited as script coordinator, and Pammi Bakshi as editor, while Pratap Mullick is listed as art director, and also as an artist along with three others.

In the comics, Supremo was an alter ego of the actor Amitabh Bachchan. As described in a contemporary article in The India Magazine, Supremo conceals his identity by wearing large glasses which resemble welding glasses, a skin-tight costume with a wrap which resembles those worn by fishermen on India's western coast, and a chakra pendant. He loves peanuts and "music is his passion", which is why he carries a Walkman. Supremo has two helpers, boys named Vijay and Anthony after Bachchan's screen characters. He also has a dolphin named Sonali, and a falcon scout Shaheen, inspired by the bird in Bachchan's film Coolie.

== See also ==
- Jimmy Zhingchak
