= Kiran Comics =

Kiran Comics was an Indian comic line that published a variety of US comics in India in English & Hindi from 1979-1990 by Kiran Publications and distributed by India Book House (IBH). Like many other Indian comics of the era, Kiran Comics relied on reprinting popular international characters. This was common practise at the height of comics sales in India, and led to the lack of original Indian comics characters until Diamond Comics and Manoj Comics created several popular original characters. The rise of Indian characters caused the demise of publications such as Kiran Comics, which only printed international comic strips.

== Series ==
English:
Tarzan	Edgar Rice Burroughs, Inc.
Tarzan Gift Album	Edgar Rice Burroughs, Inc.
Tarzan's Son	Edgar Rice Burroughs, Inc.
Laurel & Hardy	Larry Harmon Pictures Corporation
Laurel & Hardy Digest	Larry Harmon Pictures Corporation
Superman	DC Comics
Batman	DC Comics
Richie Rich	Harvey Publications
Richie Rich Gift Album	Harvey Publications
Humpy & Dumpy
