= Mullica =

Mullica may refer to:

Places

- Mullica River, a river in southern New Jersey once known as the Little Egg Harbor River
- Mullica Township, New Jersey, a township in Atlantic County
- Mullica Hill, New Jersey, a census-designated place located within Harrison Township, Gloucester County

Person

- Eric Pålsson Mullica, early Swedish settler (with Finnish ancestry) of New Jersey who is the source of the name of all of the geographic features and place names
