= Milliken, Ontario =

Milliken
- Neighbourhood
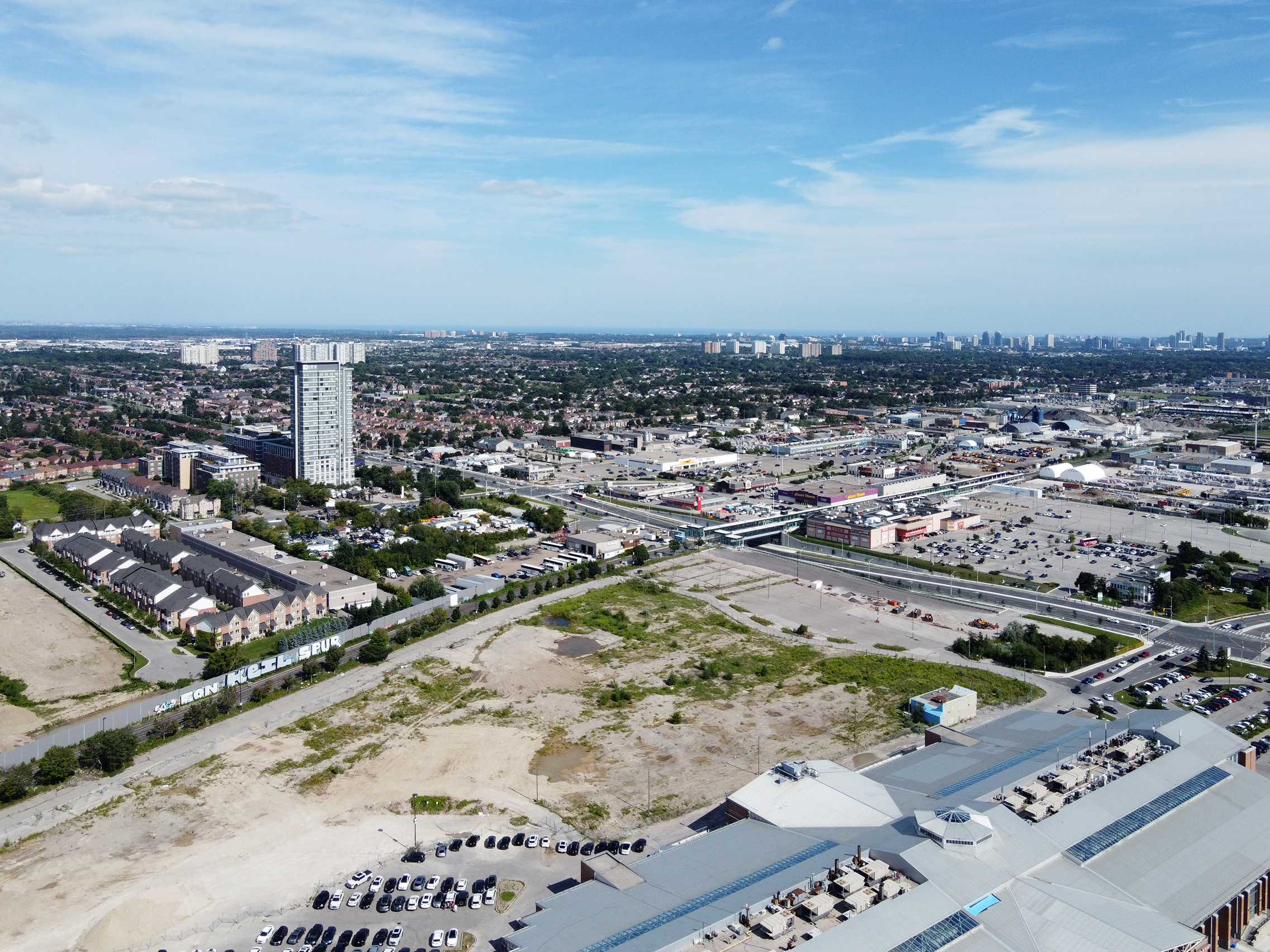
- Aerial view of Milliken in 2023

- Map highlighting Milliken, Milliken Mills West, and Milliken Mills East

- Location in Ontario
- Coordinates: 43°49′33″N 79°18′3″W
- Country: Canada
- Province: Ontario
- Cities: Markham (Milliken Mills); Toronto (Milliken)
- Settled: 1807
- Time zone: UTC-5 (Eastern (EST))
  - Summer (DST): UTC-4 (EDT)
- GNBC Code: FDUVD

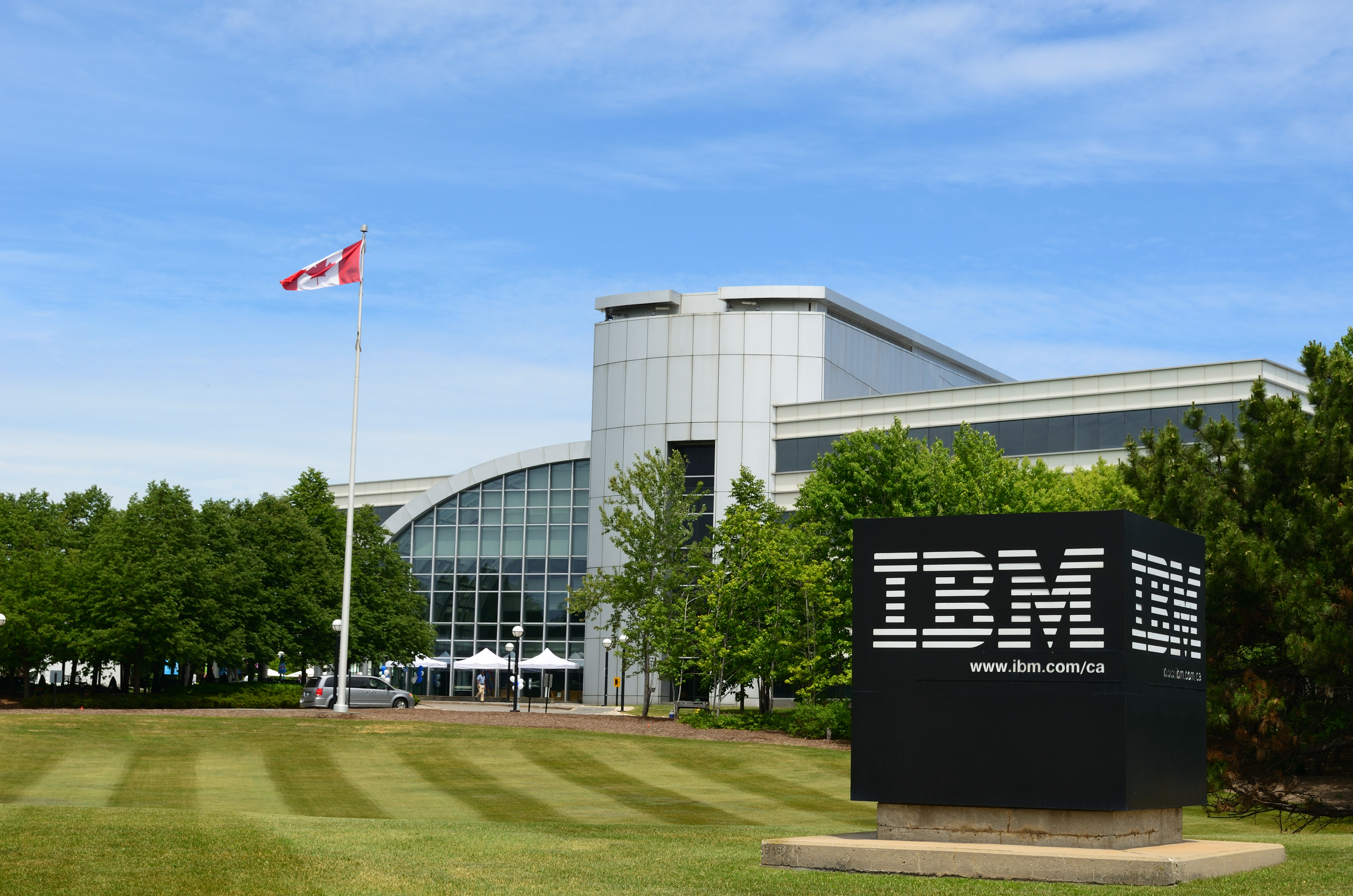
IBM Canada Head Office Building in Milliken Mills West

Milliken and Milliken Mills are neighbourhoods in the cities of Toronto and Markham. Milliken is situated in the north west section of Scarborough, whereas Milliken Mills is situated in the south-central portions of Markham. The neighbourhoods are centered on Kennedy Road and Steeles Avenue, the latter street serving as the boundary between the cities of Markham and Toronto.

A large percentage of residents own their homes, which are primarily single family detached homes. As the majority of the homes present were built when the farming left the area in the 1980s, there are many two storied houses with garages, typical of the time of building and affordability.

== History ==
The area now called "Milliken" or "Milliken's Corner" was first settled in 1798 by Captain William Demont (Dumond). Norman Milliken settled in the area around 1807. In 1814, Milliken received the deed for lot 1, concession 5, Markham Township. Milliken operated a lumber business in what was then a rural hamlet called Milliken Corners. The hamlet became a postal village when the first post office was established in 1858 (on the now Markham side) and was called Milliken after Norman Millken.

The Ebenezer United Church (1878; originally Milliken Primitive (also as Milliken Corners) Methodist Church on southeast side in Toronto) is one of a few structures remaining in the area. The church once stood on the south side of Steeles Avenue with another church on Brimley Road. Plots at the church are many of the early families of Milliken: Thomson, Rennie, Harding, Hood, Hagerman and L'Amoreaux. The church is now located on Brimley Rd, north of Steeles Ave in Markham. Evangelical Association had a church on McCowan Road north of 14th Avenue from land donated by Abraham Eckardt sometime after 1830. The church disappeared by 1878, but Eckardt Cemetery remains and now owned by the City of Markham.

Another structure that survives from the 19th century is Benjamin Milliken House constructed circa 1855. It is a Georgian Classic Revival house built by Norman Milliken's son, Benjamin Milliken II, on his farm located on Part of Lot 5, Concession 5, Markham Township. It was designated by the Town of Markham as a historic building under the Ontario Heritage Act in 1994. Benjamin Milliken House is located at 7710 Kennedy Road, Markham and is now a pub called The Major Milliken.

To the Milliken community, municipal boundaries were just lines on a map and the community's history can be found in the Archives of both Scarborough and Unionville. School Section # 2 was established here in 1847, and a log school was built during the same year.

In 1954, the area south of Steeles Avenue was severed from York County, forming the Municipality of Metropolitan Toronto. As the community was situated along Steeles Avenue, it was split between the two county/metropolitan governments. The southern portion of the community, Milliken, became a part of Metropolitan Toronto, whereas the northern portion of the community, Milliken Mills, remained with York County (reorganized into the Regional Municipality of York in 1971).

Once agricultural land, much of which disappeared with residential development beginning in the 1970s and ending near the late 1980s. The City of Markham initiated an initiative to develop "Main Street Milliken" around Old Kennedy Rd. The area has suffered from years of neglect, and revitalization plans have been welcomed by community members. New developments include a condominium development on Kennedy and Denison, Dairy Queen, Major Milliken Pub and a new housing project on Old Kennedy Rd.

The neighbourhood only gave up its final farming activities in the early 1980s and is modernizing by the year. There are green spaces such as Milliken Park, Goldhawk Park and many others, also the Milliken Trail is a walking tour of the neighbourhood.

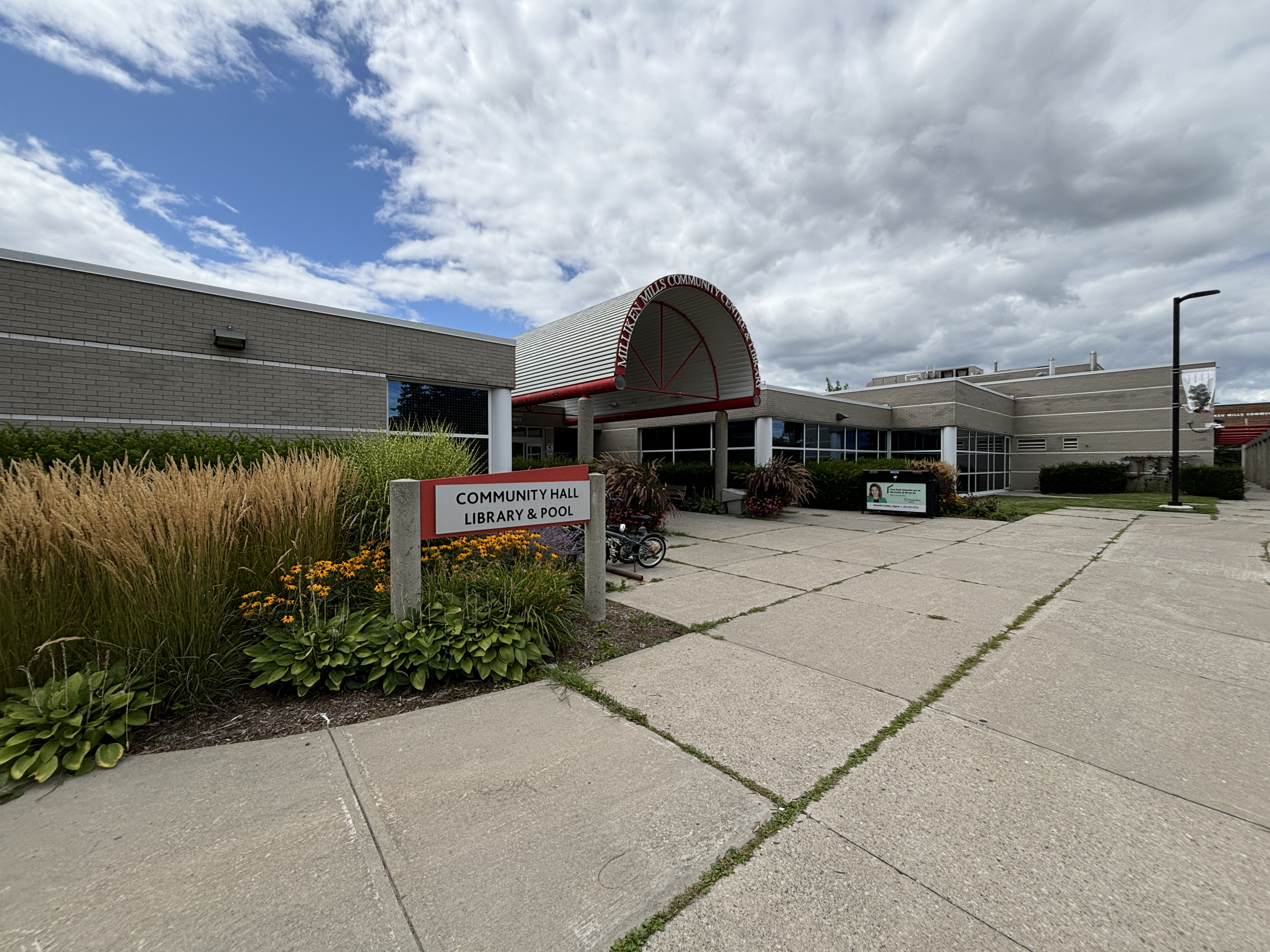
Milliken Mills Community Centre

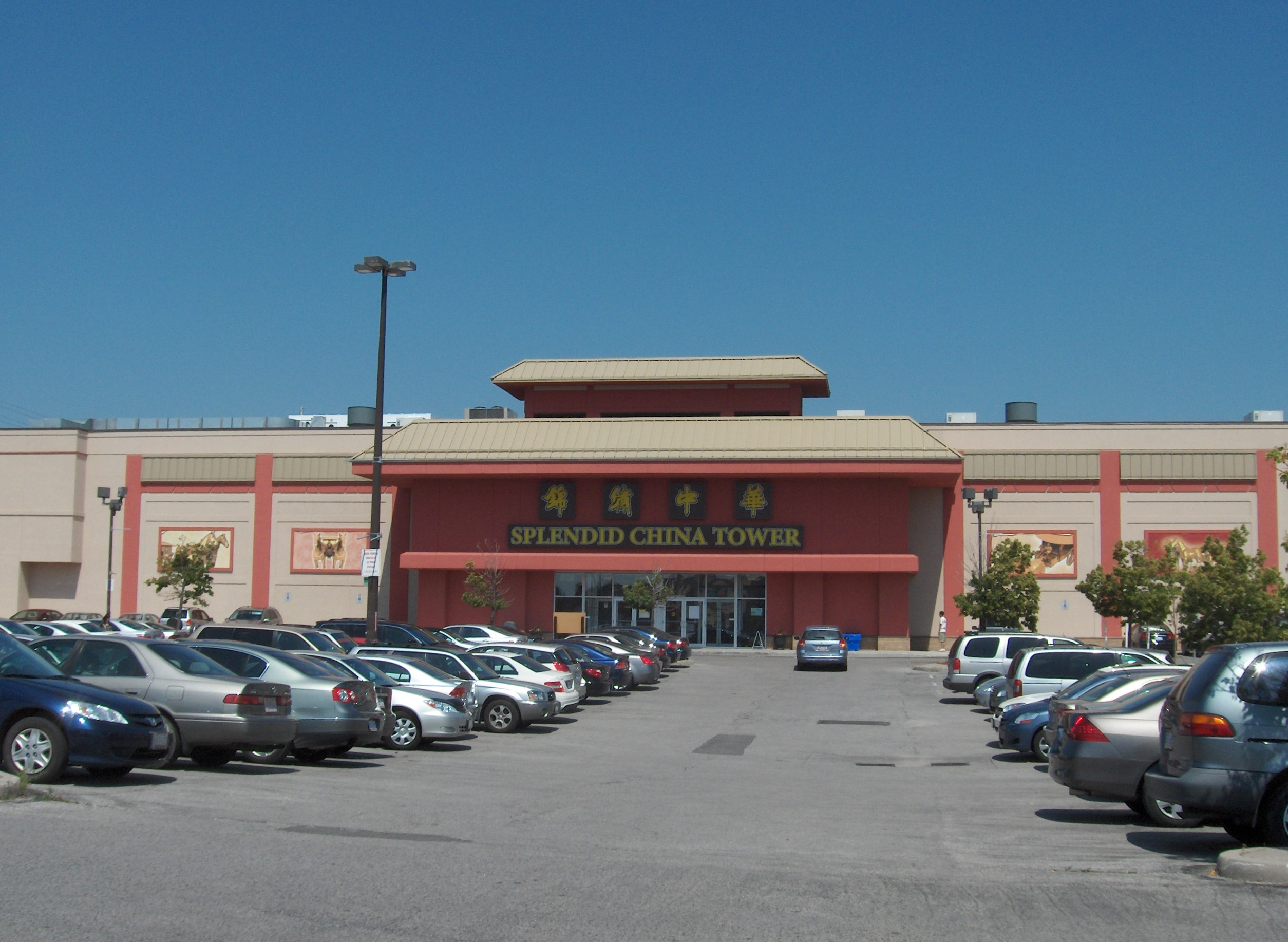
Splendid China Mall is a Chinese-themed shopping mall in Milliken. The area is home to several ethnic-themed businesses, given the area's demographic.

== Education ==
Two secular public school boards, and three separate public school boards operate in the neighbourhood. Only one of the five school boards that operate schools in the community is French first language public school board, Conseil scolaire Viamonde (CSV). CSV is a French-based public secular school board that operates one public elementary school in Milliken, École élémentaire Laure-Rièse. The elementary school provides schooling for students throughout Milliken, Milliken Mills, and adjacent communities in Markham and Scarborough.

In addition to CSV, the separate Toronto Catholic District School Board (TCDSB), and secular Toronto District School Board (TDSB) also operates English-based public schools in Milliken, providing schooling for students that reside in the neighbourhood. Presently, both TCDSB and TDSB only operate elementary schools in the area. They include:

- Agnes Macphail Public School (TDSB)
- Banting and Best Public Elementary School (TDSB)
- Brimwood Boulevard Junior Public School (TDSB)
- Macklin Public School (TDSB)
- Milliken Public School (TDSB)
- North Agincourt Junior Public School (TDSB)
- Port Royal Public School (TDSB)
- Prince of Peace Catholic Elementary School (TCDSB)
- Sir Alexander MacKenzie Senior Public School (TDSB)
- St. Rene Goupil Catholic Elementary School (TCDSB)
- The Divine Infant Catholic School (TCDSB)

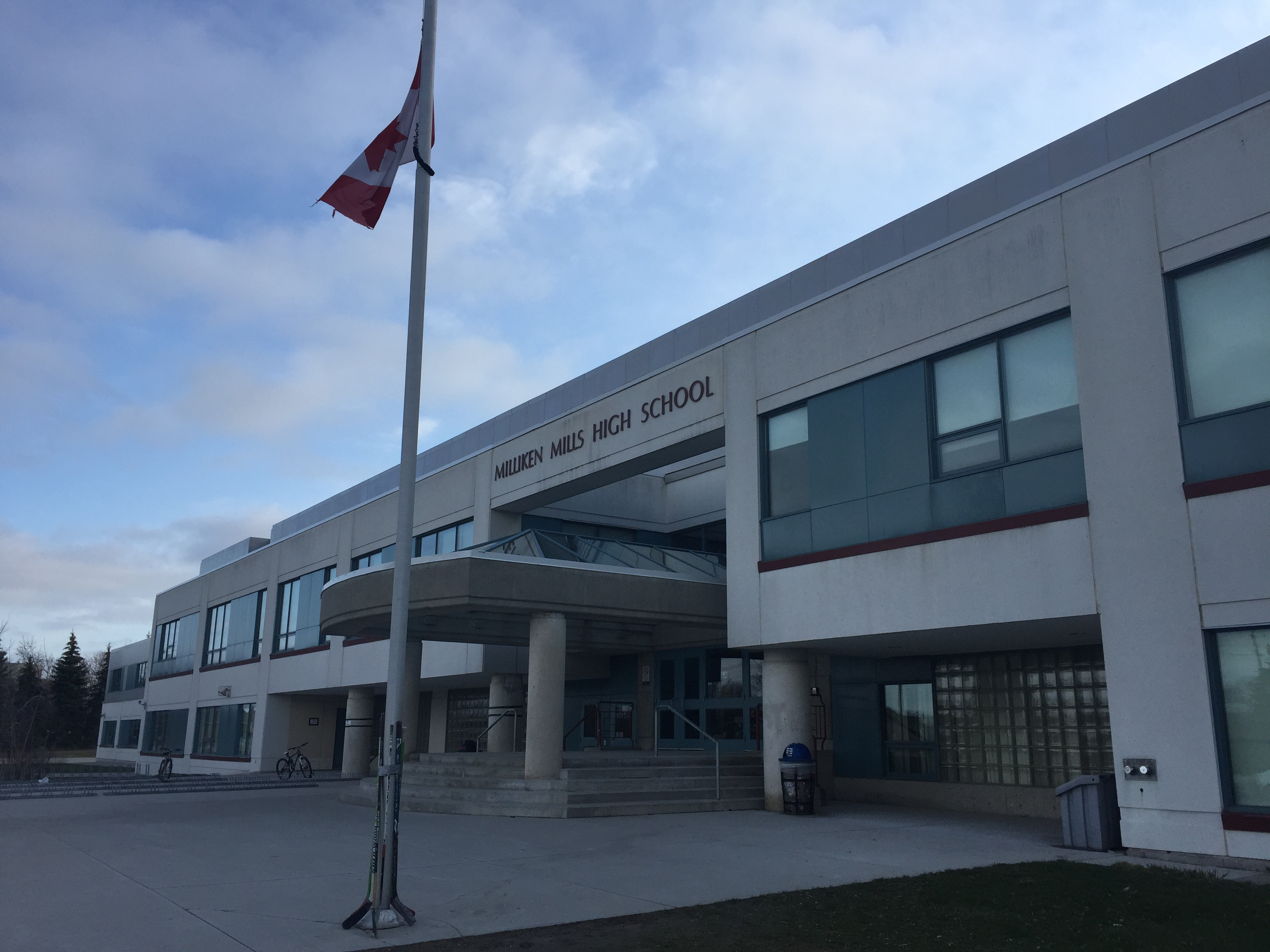
Milliken Mills High School is a public secondary school situated in Milliken Mills East.

The separate York Catholic District School Board (YCDSB) and the secular York Region District School Board (YRDSB) operates public schools, and provides schooling for students in Milliken Mills. Presently, YRDSB presently operates one secondary school, Milliken Mills High School, located in Milliken Mills East. Elementary schools located in Milliken Mills include:

- Aldergrove Public School (YRDSB)
- Coppard Glen Public School (YRDSB)
- Highgate Public School (YRDSB)
- Milliken Mills Public School (YRDSB)
- Mother Teresa Catholic Elementary School (YCDSB)
- Randall Public School (YRDSB)
- St. Benedict Catholic Elementary School (YCDSB)
- St. Francis Xavier Catholic Elementary School (YCDSB)
- Wilclay Public School (YRDSB)

== Recreation ==
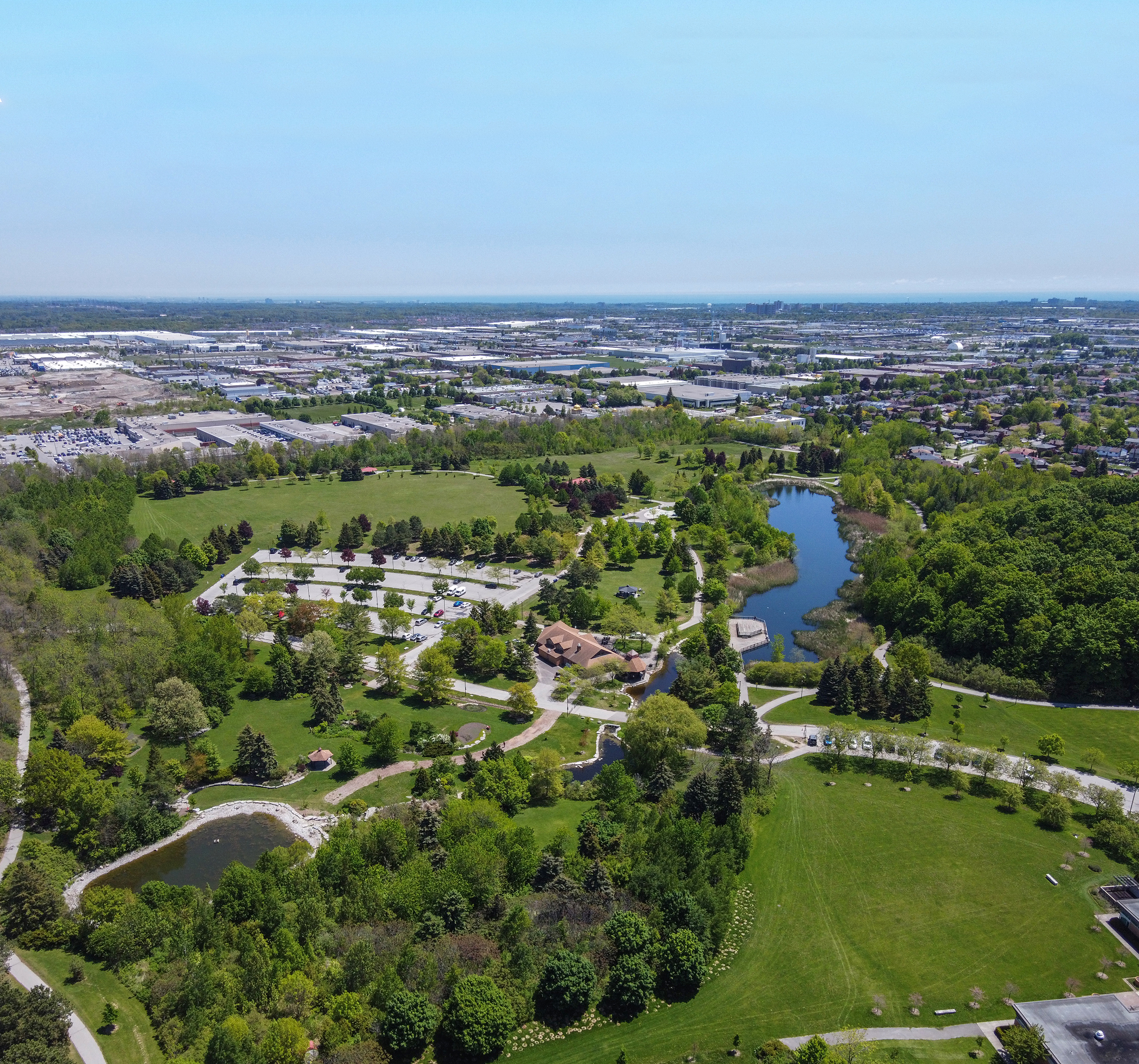
Milliken District Park is a municipal park located in Milliken.

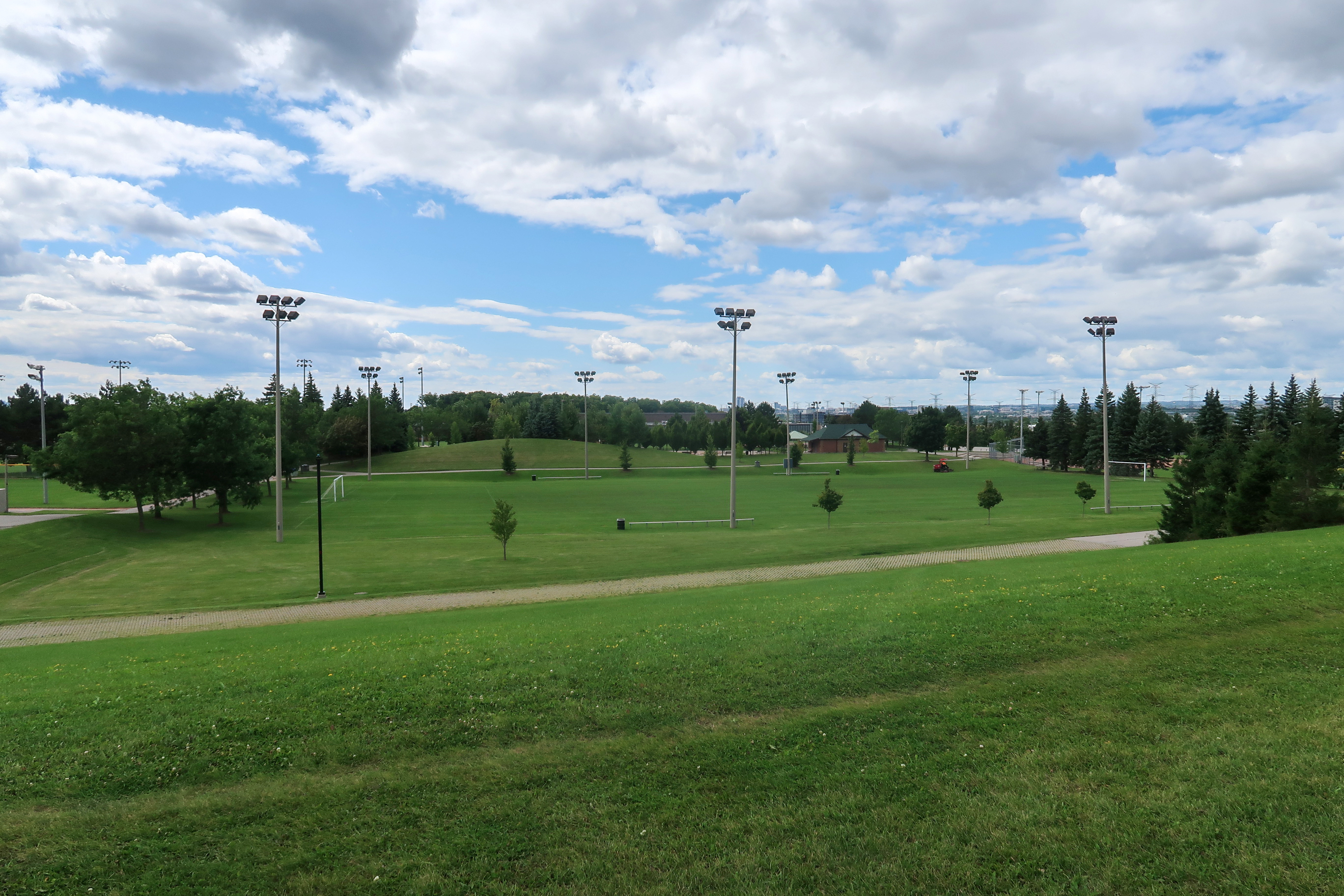
Milliken Mills Park in Markham

Milliken is home to a number of recreational amenities.

Public parks and recreational facilities situated in Milliken is managed by the Toronto Parks, Forestry and Recreation Division, whereas parks and recreational facilities located in Milliken Mills East and West, are managed by Markham.

Municipal parks situated south of Steeles Avenue, in Milliken include:

- Audrelane Park
- Goldhawk Park
- Milliken District Park
- Muirlands Park
- Port Royal Park

Municipal parks in Milliken Mills includes:

- Aldergrove Park
- Denison Park
- Harvest Moon Park
- Highgate Park
- Milliken Mills Community Park
- Randall Park
- Risebrough Park
- Wilclay Park

The City of Markham also manages the Milliken Mills Arena, a multi-purpose ice rink, was erected in 1982. In 1989, construction of Milliken Mills Community Centre was completed, which included a library, swimming pool (Alex Chiu Pool), gymnasium, weight room, and racket courts. Milliken Mills Community Park is located east of the community centre, and includes an open area with soccer pitches and an indoor soccer dome. Milliken Mills Park is located west of the community centre and features five soccer pitches and five baseball fields.

== Transportation ==
Public transportation is provided by three services, GO Transit, the Toronto Transit Commission (TTC), and York Region Transit (YRT). The TTC and YRT provide local bus routes. GO Transit commuter rail services can be accessed from Milliken GO Station.
