= Nagraj =

Raj Comics superhero

Publication information
- Publisher: Raj Comics
- First appearance: Nagraj GENL #14 (release date 1 April 1986)
- Created by: Rajkumar Gupta; Manoj Gupta

In-story information
- Alter ego: Earlier; Mr. Raj, Public Relation Officer of Bharti Communications; Now; Mr. Nagraj Shah, CEO Snake Eyes Securities
- Team affiliations: Brahmand Rakshak (Protectors of Universe), Panchnag, Sheetnag, Neernag
- Notable aliases: Snakeman, Greenman, Green Death, Venomous Gunpowder, Nag-Samrat
- Abilities: Superhuman strengths; Superhuman stamina; Divine powers; flight; Infrared vision; Energy absorption; Energy manipulation; Super regenerative healing factor; Sixth sense; Infrared sensing; Expert martial artist; Unique hypnotism; Compound powers; phenomenal will powers; invisibility; Poison bite; Snake spit; Venomous breath; Skin shedding; Millions of microscopic shape-shifting snakes in his body; Telepathy

Nagraj is a comic book superhero character appearing in Indian comic books published by Raj Comics created in the late 1980s by Rajkumar Gupta. Nagraj first appeared in the comics Nagraj GENL #14 which was written by Parshuram Sharma and illustrated by Pratap Mullick. Later Sanjay Ashtpure, Pratap Mullick, Chandu, Milind Misal and Vitthal Kamble alternately illustrated the character for 44 issues, ending in 1995 with Visarpi Ki Shadi. While the Nagraj character itself was created/conceived by the Raj Comics team, primarily Rajkumar Gupta and his sons, Parshuram Sharma was the main writer of the first Nagraj comic book. The debut issue, Nagraj (GENL #14, released in 1986), which converted the original concept into a powerful, word-for-word narrative and introduced the character to the world, was written by legendary writer Parshuram Sharma. His classic Nagraj story has achieved immortal status for Indian readers as a legacy.

Nagraj is believed to have been inspired by the mythological Ichchhadhari Nag (shapeshifting snakes) and historical Vishmanushya (venomous human).

Parshuram Sharma's concept and debut story for Nagraj comic book was written with such depth that it clearly reflected his intellectual, mystical, mythological and spiritual thought, showcasing his masterful writing. The quality of his character creation remains unmatched by other writers in the field. His writing for the character's initial impact and resonance are considered unparalleled in Indian comics. After some years (around 1995-1996) when Nagraj already became a successful and well established character, Anupam Sinha, a writer of another Raj Comics successful character "Super Commando Dhruv" started writing and illustrating Nagraj stories.

In the middle of the nineties, as Anupam Sinha (who was already running the mega-successful Dhruv series) took over the helms of Nagraj as well. Anupam Sinha's expansive narration could not completely fit in a single comic, so he used multi-comic stories to layer and enrich his tales. The Khajana arc by Anupam Sinha set up the backstory beautifully, and discredited Nagmani many years after the comics began. He also led to increase in frequency of Two-in-One comics, which combined Nagraj and Dhruv and started happening once in a year. Nagraj has changed a lot in his 40 years in print, both in terms of looks as well as powers and abilities. With time many new artists such as Lalit Sharma and Hemant Kumar have done illustration of Nagraj.

== Fictional character biography ==
In ancient times, there existed a kingdom known as Takshaknagar, ruled by King Takshakraj and Queen Lalita who had no children. The absence of a prince or princess made Nagpasha, the younger brother of the King Takshakraj the only potential heir to the throne.

One day when the queen was going to pray to Deva Kaljayi, Nagpasha replaced the curtained plate of her offerings to the god with one containing a dead mongoose. The Snake God got angry and knocked her unconscious with his venomous breath. When the child was born, everyone believed him dead because his whole body was blue and showed no signs of life.

As per Hindu rituals, the newborn baby was thrown into the river. Meanwhile, the snake deity Deva Kaljayi appeared in the dreams of King Maniraj and his wife Queen Manika, rulers of ageless Ichchhadhaari nags, living secretly on an invisible island in the Indian Ocean called Nagdweep. He told them the location of the baby and asked them to cure him. Many years passed and the treatment started showing results and, although still in the suspended animation, the colour of the baby had gradually changed to green.

Later Vishandhar, an evil Tantrik placed him back into the same bushes in the river where he was found. A priest of the nearby temple located him and gave him to Professor Nagmani, who was wandering in the nearby forest searching for snakes. The child had extraordinary healing powers and was extremely venomous. He raised the baby, who became Nagraj.

In his debut issue, Nagraj was unleashed as an international terror weapon by the evil scientist Professor Nagmani. Nagraj, in this first mission, was tasked with stealing a golden statue of a Goddess from a temple that was protected by tribal devotees, snakes, and by a mysterious 300-year-old Sadhu named Baba Gorakhnath. Nagraj succeeded in his task, but upon confrontation with Gorakhnath and his mystic black mongoose shikangi, was defeated. Gorakhnath read his mind and discovered that Professor Nagmani had implanted a mind-control device in the form of a capsule in Nagraj's head, to keep him under his control. Gorakhnath operated and removed the capsule from Nagraj's head, setting Nagraj free of Professor Nagmani's control. Nagraj then became Baba Goraknath's disciple and vowed to eliminate crime and terror from the Earth. Since then, Nagraj has toured the world and defeated many villains and terrorists such as Bulldog, Gangster William, Seaman, General Tamta, Shankar Shahnshah.

Nagraj lives as Raj (After Nagraj Ke Baad, he is under the disguise of Nagraj Shah) in a fictional Metropolitan City Mahanagar as an employee of a TV channel that he owns secretly.

== Nagraj Parallel Series ==
These days Raj Comics have published four parallel series of Nagraj, where each Nagraj is involved in a different universe. There are the following four parallel Nagraj series:

1. Nagraj – This is the early Nagraj, this Nagraj introduced in first comic of nagraj, Nagraj has continued in Nag Pralay comic after Visarpi ki Shadi.
2. Vishwarakshak Nagraj – The ongoing series of Nagraj, which is being illustrated and written by Anupam Sinha. This version of Nagraj is now called as Vishwarakshak Nagraj.
3. Aatankharta Nagraj – This Nagraj appears in the World Terrorism series. This version of Nagraj was introduced with the comics 'Hari Maut' SPCL #2281 which was released on 5 September 2007. This is another timeline of Nagraj which separated from Vishwarakshak Nagraj after the comics 'Visarpi Ki Shadi' SPCL #42. In this timeline, Nagraj does not move to Mahanagar but continues on the mission to eliminate world terrorism. This series, until now, has not portrayed villains with supernatural powers, but are more like gangsters or dons of different countries/cities. It is illustrated by Mr. Hemant and written by Nitin Mishra.
4. Narak Nashak Nagraj – This Nagraj is a bit different from the original Nagraj in appearance. He was introduced in the comics 'Hallabol' SPCL #2396. He wears a jacket and a trouser and has longer hair. He also possesses different powers (Sheetika, Takshika, and Agnika) than the original Nagraj. He also rides on a flying snake named Sarpat. Until now, the series has shown him fighting vampires, demons, zombies, etc. It was illustrated by Hemant and written by Nitin Mishra.

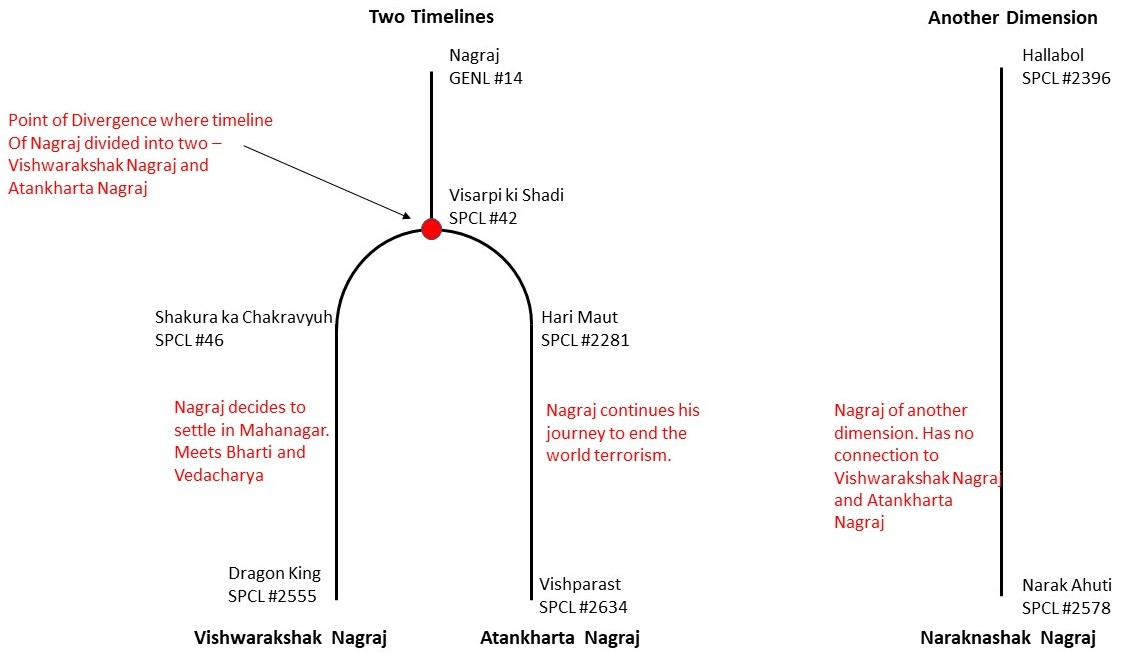
Nagraj currently has 3 ongoing comic series in 2 timelines and 1 dimension

== Powers and abilities ==
Ever since writer & artist Anupam Sinha took over the character of Nagraj, his powers and abilities have grown stronger, making him powerful enough to counter any character of this comic universe, as Sinha sees it. Sinha shown his vision for Nagraj through making him one of the most powerful Icchadhari Naagas of his time, by challenging the Supreme Snake-Gods like Sheshnaag, Vasuki, Takshak, Kaaljayi, and defeating the likes of Kaaldoot, Trifana, Mahavyaal and Sheetnaag Kumar, who are among the mightiest snakes.

- Microscopic snakes: Nagraj uses them variably as ropes, ladders, parachutes, shields, boats, spies and messengers. Most notable among them is Naganand, at a time considered right-hand man of Nagraj, he left Nagraj's body to look after the people of Nagdweep at Nagraj's order after he upgraded to become an ichchhadhaari nag. Some of the notable snakes possessed by Nagraj are Jagmag sarp, Naav-sarp, Nagfani sarp, Ichchhadhaari-naags, Dhwansak sarp, Tishk sarp
- Ichchhadhaari nags. It is quite notable that some of them possess such great powers which rival Nagraj's own, but they all hold great respect for Nagraj. While some of them live in his body just cause they have no better place to live, others live willingly to learn something from Nagraj's way of life. Most notable names among them are:
  - Saudaangi: She is the member of an Egyptian clan of snakes which fights against the evil mummy of pharaoh Tutankhemun. Like Nagfani snakes she too has spikes on her body when she is in her snake form, she also has a limited knowledge of Tantra.
  - Sheetnag kumar: He belongs to a clan of ichchhadhari nags living on the Himayalas. He can create and manipulate ice at his will giving it different forms like spears and arrows. Sheetnag-kumar also regulates Nagraj's body temperature making him immune to normal fire when he is inside his body and also giving him protection against severe cold; one of Nagraj's greatest weakness which makes him drowsy pushing him towards hibernation . Sheetnag-kumar's Fang can absorb many attacks and revert them back towards the enemy. He can also freeze all the liquids inside one's body paralysing him.
  - Naagu: Naagu is the most cheerful and comical among Nagraj's snakes. His acts are such that at times it becomes difficult to judge whether he is a jester or a helper. He belongs to a family of Ichchhadhaari naags living near Mahanagar.
- Venom: Nagraj's venom is the most powerful venom of the world, so much so that direct contact with it results in instant death and melting of body. He gained his venom through the blessings of snake deity Deva Kaaljayi, who himself was blessed by Lord Shiva. It is explained that Lord Shiva who holds the strongest venom of the universe synthesised during Samudra-Manthan, gave a minor portion of it to Deva Kaljayi who holds a dilute form of it and Nagraj holds an even more dilute form of it. The different ways in which Nagraj uses his venom also results in various powers he is said to possess. Like Vish-funkar, Nagraj uses his breath to force out his venom in vapour form, depending upon its concentration the vish-funkar can cause a variety of damages to his enemies. Its effects include temporary blindness, drowsiness, black outs, deaths and for once it even caused fire.
- Ichchhadhaari Shakti: Nagraj even when limited on power has been seen successfully switching between his real and snake form. He can use this power to divide his body into particles and rejoin them within 3 seconds making him invisible and intangible temporarily.
- Hypnotism: Nagraj has a unique hypnotic effect, formerly considered a separate power, this power was later explained as an application of his ichchhadhaari shakti. Utilizing this power Nagraj can cast a hypnotic reality upon his surroundings using his eyes.[1] Breaking this hypnotic fate is extremely difficult and going against it is impossible. Nagraj and his snakes can cast normal hypnotism too.
- Body-fusions: Nagraj at times has used this power to fuse with his allies to bring down a powerful enemy. He can perform two types of fusions :
  - Multi-membered imperfect fusion: In this type of fusion many people can join to form a single body having many heads and hands. Every individual retains his or her own identity and set of powers. Nagraj used it for the first time fusing with the legendary five in order to fight against a creature created by Nagina.
  - Two-membered perfect fusion: In this type of fusion Nagraj can join with a single person to form a whole new identity. The new identity has new set of powers born from the combination of the participants' sets of powers. Nagraj displayed this power for the first time fusing with Lava to become Agni-Nagraj (Fire-Nagraj). The newborn identity could release 'burning snakes' and could breathe 'venomous fire'.
- Psychic powers: In addition to his ability to communicate with snakes, Nagraj contacted Super Commando Dhruva telepathically when he was trapped in a parallel dimension containing evil souls.

== Known relatives and close friends ==
Nagraj, along with his deeds, has earned a large amount of friends, many of whom appeared just once, but some that appeared more often, and still fewer that became permanent figures in Nagraj's stories. Here is a list of some very well known characters in his comics :

- King Takshakraj: father (deceased)
- Queen Lalita: mother (deceased)
- Baba Gorakhnath: Mentor
- Mahatma Kaaldoot: Mentor
- Dada Vedacharya: Mentor
- Deva Kaaljayi: Snake Deity
- Nagpasha: Uncle (Arch-enemy)
- Bharti/Faceless: Friend, business partner. She is in one-sided love with Nagraj. She fights with the identity of Faceless.
- Visarpi: Queen of Nagdweep, love interest of Nagraj.
- Vishaank: Crown prince of Nagdweep, younger brother of Visarpi and son of Nagpasha born out of Gurudev's science. Takes secret identity of Chhota Nagraj.
- Sillu: Teenager computer genius, assists Nagraj with tech issues. He's a confidant of Vishaank and crime fighting partner going by Cybro.
- Flemina: Alter ego of Shama, a friend of Vishaank. Becomes legal counsel for Nagraj in future.
- Nagrani: Mother to Nagraj's son Nageesh in a parallel dimension. She is the female equivalent of Nagraj.
- Nageesh: Son that lives with mother Nagrani in a parallel dimension
- Super Commando Dhruva: Best Friend and an ally superhero
- Saudangi: An Egyptian snake-woman with tantrik powers and thorns on her body that lives in his body. Later on it was known that Saudangi was an Egyptian princess and Nagraj was a soldier in their previous birth.
- Sheetnag Kumar: Friend that lives in his body, Prince of snow snakes "Sheetnaag".
- Panch naag: Naagdev, Sarpraj, Naagpreti, Singhnaag and Nagarjuna. They are Ichchhadhari naags (shape shifting snakes) from Naagdweep.
- Naagu: Friend that lives in his body. Very fond of watching movies.
- Professor Srikant/Adrishya Hatyara (Invisible killer): With a situationally-driven personality.

== Enemies ==
Innumerable enemies of Nagraj have appeared in Nagraj's comics; many died, but some lived on to appear again. Here is the list of Nagraj's major enemies that are still alive and who can be expected to make a comeback in future issues:

- Professor Nagmani: Nagraj's so-called creator who brought up Nagraj.
- Thodanga: A strange African creature. He has a combined body of human, turtle, and rhinoceros.
- Nagdant: A jealous, comparatively weaker copy of Nagraj made by Professor Nagmani.
- Tutan Khamen: Ancient Egyptian mummy whose main power-source, his mask, was snatched away by Nagraj.
- Miss Killer: Beautiful, young, evil scientist from Japan.
- Nagina: A female tantrik and shape-shifting snake.
- Vishandhar: A male tantrik and shape-shifting snake.
- Jaadugar Shakura: An evil sorcerer from an alien planet of immortal wizard dwarfs.
- Nagpasha: Nagraj's immortal venomous uncle who murdered his parents.
- Gurudev: Nagpasha's guru, a man good with mechanical science but evil on intentions who wishes to rule the world though Nagpasha.
- Kentuki: A student of Gurudev, who is a physically powerful snake having the strength of fifty elephants.
- Polka: A terrorist and scientist who works for Nagpasha.
- Zulu: An African exorcist and scientist. An expert of Voodoo and Zombies.
- See-Through: An invisible soul that stole a big share of Nagraj's shape-shifting power, but still wants more.
- Sapera: A man whose power is Nagraj's weakness, i.e. snake charming music.
- Karanvashi: A magician who uses hypnotism to enslave people.
- Vish-Amrit: Duo of Paranatural powers troubling innocents on Earth while playing hide and seek.
- Khalnayak Nagraj: Evil side of Nagraj's personality which still exists in his unconscious mind.
- Tantrata: Bharti's nanaji (maternal grandfather) who took over Bharti's brother Agraj's body and wants to rule the world.
- Garalgant: A famous enemy of Dev Kaljayi but also become enemy of Nagraj.
- Crime King/Supreme head: A quadruple amputee powerful enemy of Nagraj.

== Comics list ==
=== Vishwarakshak Nagraj ===
Serial No.	Year	Issue No.	Original Hindi Title	English transliteration of comic title	Comic Title in English	Solo/Two-hero/Multi-hero/other	Artist	Author	Note
1	1986	GENL #14	नागराज	Nagraj	Nagraj	Solo	Pratap Mullik	Parshuram Sharma	Debut issue of Nagraj
2	1986	GENL #19	नागराज की कब्र	Nagraj Ki Kabra	Grave of Nagraj	Solo	Sanjay Ashtputre	Parshuram Sharma	Part 1
3	1986	GENL #26	नागराज का बदला	Nagraj Ka Badla	Revenge of Nagraj	Solo	Sanjay Ashtputre	Parshuram Sharma	Part 2
4	1987	GENL #31	नागराज की होंग कोंग यात्रा	Nagraj Ki Hong Kong Yatra	Nagraj's Hong Kong Trip	Solo	Sanjay Ashtputre	Parshuram Sharma	Part 1
5	1987	GENL #33	नागराज और शांगो	Nagraj Aur Shango	Nagraj And Shango	Solo	Sanjay Ashtputre	Parshuram Sharma	Part 2
6	1987	GENL #39	खूनी खोज	Khooni Khoj	Bloody Expedition	Solo	Milind Mullik, Sanjay Ashtputre	Manoj Gupta (as Raja)	Part 1
7	1987	GENL #50	खूनी यात्रा	Khooni Yatra	Bloody Safari	Solo	Chandu, Vinay M Kumar	Manoj Gupta (as Raja)	Part 2
8	1987	GENL #51	नागराज का इन्साफ	Nagraj Ka Insaaf	Justice Of Nagraj	Solo	Chandu, Vinay M Kumar	Manoj Gupta (as Raja)	Part 3
9	1988	GENL #65	खूनी जंग	Khooni Jung	Bloody Battle	Solo	Milind Mullik	Manoj Gupta (as Raja)	Part 1
10	1988	GENL #72	प्रलयंकारी नागराज	Pralayankari Nagraj	Nagraj The Destroyer	Solo	Milind Mullik, Vinay M Kumar	Manoj Gupta (as Raja)	Part 2
11	1989	GENL #81	खूनी कबीला	Khooni Kabeela	Bloody Tribe	Solo	Chandu	Manoj Gupta (as Raja)	Part 1
12	1989	GENL #85	कोबरा घाटी	Cobra Ghati	Valley of Cobra	Solo	Chandu, Vinay M Kumar	Manoj Gupta (as Raja)	Part 2
13	1990	GENL #114	बच्चोँ के दुश्मन	Bachchon Ke Dushman	Enemy of the Kids	Solo	Chandu, Vinay M Kumar	Tarun Kumar Wahi	
14	1990	GENL #150	प्रलयंकारी मणि	Pralayankari Mani		Solo	Chandu	Tarun Kumar Wahi	Part 1
15	1990	GENL #151	शंकर शहंशाह	Shankar Shahanshah		Solo	Chandu	Tarun Kumar Wahi	Part 2
16	1990	GENL #172	नागराज का दुश्मन	Nagraj ka Dushman		Solo	Chandu	Tarun Kumar Wahi	Part 1 Introduction of Nagdant
17	1990	GENL #175	इच्छाधारी नागराज	Ichchhadhaari Nagraj		Solo	Chandu	Tarun Kumar Wahi	Part 2
18	1990	GENL #200	कालदूत	Kaldoot	Messenger of Death	Solo	Chandu	Manoj Gupta (as Raja)	Introduction of Kaldoot
19	1990	GENL #220	जादूगर शाकूरा	Jadugar Shakura	Magician Shakura	Solo	Chandu	Manoj Gupta (as Raja)	Introduction of Jadugar Shakoora
20	1990	GENL #234	बौना शैतान	Bauna Shaitan		Solo	Chandu	Manoj Gupta (as Raja)	Part 1
21	1990	GENL #240	ताजमहल की चोरी	Tajmahal Ki Chori		Solo	Chandu	Manoj Gupta (as Raja)	Part 2 Introduction of Thodanga and Miss Killer
22	1990	GENL #250	लाल मौत	Lal Maut	Red Death	Solo	Chandu	Tarun Kumar Wahi	
23	1990	GENL #270	काबुकी का खजाना	Kabuki Ka Khajana	The Treasure of Kabuki	Solo	Chandu	Sanjay Gupta	Part 1
24	1990	GENL #280	थोडांगा	Thodanga	Thodanga	Solo	Mullik Studio	Sanjay Gupta	Part 2
25	1990	GENL #295	तूफ़ान-जू	Toofan-Ju	Toofan-Ju	Solo	Mullik Studio	Sanjay Gupta, Tarun Kumar Wahi	
26	1991	GENL #320	जादू का शहंशाह	Jadu Ka Shahanshah		Solo	Pratap Mullik	Tarun Kumar Wahi	
27	1991	SPCL #1	नागराज और सुपर कमांडो ध्रुव	Nagraj aur Super Commando Dhruva	Nagraj and Super Commando Dhruva	Two-hero: Dhruva & Nagraj Guest Appearances: Parmanu, Vinashdoot & Gagan	Chandu	Sanjay Gupta	First special issue published by Raj Comics. It brought Nagraj and Dhruva together for the first time
28	1991	SPCL #5	नगीना का जाल	Nagina Ka Jaal	Nagina's Trap	Solo	Pratap Mullik	Sanjay Gupta	
29	1992	SPCL #8	बुगाकू	Bugaaku	Bugaaku	Two-hero: Dhruva & Nagraj	Pratap Mullik	Sanjay Gupta	
30	1992	GENL #350	अजगर का तूफ़ान	Ajgar Ka Toofan		Solo	Chandu	Tarun Kumar Wahi	
31	1992	GENL #375	बकोरा का जादू	Bakora Ka Jadu	The Magic of Bakora	Solo	Pratap Mullik	Tarun Kumar Wahi	
32	1993	GENL #390	पिरामिडोँ की रानी	Pyramidon ki Rani	Queen of Pyramids	Solo	Chandu	Tarun Kumar Wahi	
33	1993	GENL #420	मिस्टर 420	Mister 420	Mister 420	Solo	Chandu	Sanjay Gupta	
34	1993	GENL #444	थोडांगा की मौत	Thodanga Ki Maut	Thodanga's Death	Solo	Chandu, Vitthal Kamble	Manoj Gupta (as Raja)	
35	1993	GENL #470	बेम बेम बिगेलो	Bem Bem Bigelo	Bem Bem Bigelo	Solo	Pratap Mullik	Tarun Kumar Wahi	Nagraj's last solo general issue
36	1993	SPCL #16	फिर आया नागदंत	Fir Aya Nagdant		Solo	Chandu	Tarun Kumar Wahi	
37	1993	SPCL #20	नगीना	Nagina	Nagina	Solo	Chandu	Tarun Kumar Wahi	
38	1993	SPCL #25	मिस किलर	Miss Killer	Miss Killer	Solo	Vitthal Kamble	Tarun Kumar Wahi	
39	1994	SPCL #29	तूतेनतू	Tutenatu	Tutenatu	Solo	Milind Misal, Vitthal Kamble	Tarun Kumar Wahi	
40	1994	SPCL #31	अदृश्य हत्यारा	Adrashya Hatyara	Invisible Killer	Solo	Milind Misal, Vitthal Kamble	Sanjay Gupta	
41	1994	SPCL #35	कांजा	Kanja	Kanja	Solo	Milind Misal, Vitthal Kamble	Tarun Kumar Wahi	
42	1994	SPCL #36	पापराज	Paapraj	Sin King	Solo	Milind Misal, Vitthal Kamble	Haneef Azhar	
43	1995	SPCL #39	विजेता नागराज	Vijeta Nagraj	Winner Nagraj	Solo	Milind Misal, Vitthal Kamble	Sanjay Gupta	
44	1995	SPCL #42	विसर्पी की शादी	Visarpi Ki Shadi	Visarpi's Wedding	Solo	Milind Misal, Vitthal Kamble	Haneef Azhar	Last Nagraj comic before Anupam Sinha.
45	1995	SPCL #46	शाकूरा का चक्रव्यूह	Shakura Ka Chakravyuh		Solo	Anupam Sinha	Anupam Sinha, Haneef Azhar	Khazana Series - Part 1 (First Nagraj comic by Anupam Sinha.)
46	1995	SPCL #49	नागराज का अंत	Nagraj Ka Ant	End Of Nagraj	Solo	Anupam Sinha	Anupam Sinha, Haneef Azhar	Khazana Series - Part 2
47	1995	SPCL #54	ज़हर	Zahar	Poison	Solo	Anupam Sinha	Anupam Sinha, Haneef Azhar	Khazana Series - Part 3
48	1995	SPCL #57	नागपाशा	Nagpasha	Nagpasha	Solo	Anupam Sinha	Anupam Sinha, Haneef Azhar	Khazana Series - Part 4
49	1996	SPCL #60	खजाना	Khajana	Treasure	Solo	Anupam Sinha	Anupam Sinha, Haneef Azhar	Khazana Series - Part 5 (Concluding Part)
50	1996	SPCL #65	क्राइम किंग	Crime King	Crime King	Solo	Anupam Sinha	Anupam Sinha	First Nagraj comic with complete story and art by Anupam Sinha
51	1996	SPCL #67	राजनगर की तबाही	Rajnagar Ki Tabahi	The Doom Of Rajnagar	Two hero: Dhruva & Nagraj	Anupam Sinha	Anupam Sinha	
52	1996	SPCL #71	विषकन्या	Vishkanya	Femme Fatale	Solo	Anupam Sinha	Anupam Sinha, Tarun Kumar Wahi	
53	1996	SPCL #75	स्नेक पार्क	Snake Park	Snake Park	Solo	Anupam Sinha	Anupam Sinha	
54	1997	SPCL #81	इच्छाधारी	Ichchhadhari	The Shape Changer	Solo	Anupam Sinha	Anupam Sinha	
55	1997	SPCL #88	केँचुली	Kenchuli		Solo	Anupam Sinha	Anupam Sinha	
56	1997	SPCL #90	प्रलय	Pralay	Doom's Day	Two hero: Dhruva & Nagraj	Anupam Sinha	Anupam Sinha	
57	1997	SPCL #93	विनाश	Vinaash	The Catastrophe	Two hero: Dhruva & Nagraj	Anupam Sinha	Anupam Sinha	
58	1997	SPCL #102	ज़हरीले	Zahareele	Poisonous	Solo	Anupam Sinha	Anupam Sinha	
59	1998	SPCL #106	बांबी	Bambi		Two hero: Nagraj & Shakti	Anupam Sinha	Anupam Sinha	
60	1998	SPCL #110	तानाशाह	Tanashah	Dictator	Two hero: Dhruva & Nagraj	Anupam Sinha	Anupam Sinha	
61	1998	SPCL #113	सूरमा	Soorma		Two hero: Nagraj & Parmanu	Anupam Sinha	Anupam Sinha	
62	1998	SPCL #120	सपेरा	Sapera		Solo	Anupam Sinha	Jolly Sinha	First Nagraj comic authored by Anupam Sinha's wife Jolly Sinha.
63	1999	SPCL #125	फ़न	Fan	Hood	Solo	Anupam Sinha	Jolly Sinha	
64	1999	SPCL #129	नागिन	Nagin		Solo	Anupam Sinha	Jolly Sinha	
65	1999	SPCL #137	कलियुग	Kaliyug	Kaliyug	Multi-hero: Dhruva, Nagraj & Shakti	Anupam Sinha	Jolly Sinha	
66	1999	SPCL #142	विष अमृत	Vish Amrit		Solo	Anupam Sinha	Jolly Sinha	
67	1999	SPCL #155	सम्मोहन	Sammohan	Hypnotism	Solo	Anupam Sinha	Jolly Sinha	
68	2000	SPCL #169	राज का राज	Raj Ka Raj	Raj's Secret	Solo	Anupam Sinha	Jolly Sinha	
69	2000	SPCL #185	कोहराम	Kohraam	Furore	Multi-hero	Anupam Sinha	Jolly Sinha	
70	2000	SPCL #189	क़यामत	Qayamat	Doomsday	Two hero: Nagraj & Parmanu	Anupam Sinha	Jolly Sinha	
71	2000	SPCL #202	मृत्यु दंड	Mrityu Dand		Solo	Anupam Sinha	Jolly Sinha	Trifana Series - Part 1
72	2000	SPCL #206	नागद्वीप	Nagdweep	Snake Island	Solo	Anupam Sinha	Jolly Sinha	Trifana Series - Part 2
73	2000	SPCL #211	त्रिफ़ना	Trifana		Solo	Anupam Sinha	Jolly Sinha	Trifana Series - Part 3
74	2000	SPCL #213	महायुद्ध	Mahayuddh		Solo	Anupam Sinha	Jolly Sinha	Trifana Series - Part 4 (Concluding Part)
75	2000	SPCL #217	अग्रज	Agraj		Solo	Anupam Sinha	Jolly Sinha	Agraj Series - Part 1
76	2000	SPCL #225	नागराज का क़हर	Nagraj Ka Qahar		Solo	Anupam Sinha	Jolly Sinha	Agraj Series - Part 2
77	2001	SPCL #231	तांडव	Tandav		Solo	Anupam Sinha	Jolly Sinha	Agraj Series - Part 3 (Concluding Part)
78	2001	SPCL #235	ज़लज़ला	Zalzala	Jolt	Multi-hero	Anupam Sinha	Jolly Sinha	
79	2001	SPCL #241	आतंक	Aatank	Terror	Two hero: Dhruva & Nagraj	Anupam Sinha	Jolly Sinha	First part of a two-part story
80	2001	SPCL #246	दुश्मन नागराज	Dushman Nagraj	The Enemy Nagraj	Two hero: Dhruva & Nagraj	Anupam Sinha	Jolly Sinha	Concluding part of the two-part story
81	2001	SPCL #253	शक्तिहीन नागराज	Shaktiheen Nagraj		Solo	Anupam Sinha	Jolly Sinha	
82	2001	SPCL #264	नहीँ बचेगा नागराज	Nahin Bachega Nagraj		Solo	Anupam Sinha	Jolly Sinha	
83	2001	SPCL #271	संग्राम	Sangraam	War	Two-hero: Dhruva & Nagraj	Anupam Sinha	Anupam Sinha	
84	2001	SPCL #279	कालचक्र	Kalchakra		Solo	Anupam Sinha	Jolly Sinha	Kalchakra Series Part 1
85	2002	SPCL #293	कुंडली	Kundli		Solo	Anupam Sinha	Jolly Sinha	Kalchakra Series Part 2
86	2002	SPCL #304	विध्वंस	Vidhwans	Demolition	Multistarrer	Anupam Sinha	Anupam Sinha	
87	2002	SPCL #315	परकाले	Parkaale	Bringer of Death	Two-hero: Dhruva & Nagraj	Anupam Sinha	Jolly Sinha	
88	2002	SPCL #323	एलान-ए-जंग	Elaan-E-Jung		Solo	Anupam Sinha	Anupam Sinha	Kalchakra Series Part 3
89	2002	SPCL #337	काली मौत	Kali Maut	Black Death	Solo	Anupam Sinha	Jolly Sinha	Kalchakra Series Part 4
90	2002	SPCL #344	संहार	Sanhaar	Slaughter	Two-hero: Dhruva & Nagraj	Anupam Sinha	Jolly Sinha	
91	2002	SPCL #351	नागराज अमेरिका मेँ	Nagraj America Main	Nagraj In America	Solo	Anupam Sinha	Jolly Sinha	Kalchakra Series Part 5
92	2003	SPCL #365	आतंकवादी नागराज	Atankwadi Nagraj	Terrorist Nagraj	Solo	Anupam Sinha	Jolly Sinha	Kalchakra Series Part 6 (Concluding Part)
93	2003	SPCL #385	ड्रैकुला	Dracula	Dracula	Solo	Anupam Sinha	Jolly Sinha	Dracula Series- Part 2, Dracula Series- Part 1 was a Super Commando Dhruv book Dracula Ka Hamla.
94	2003	SPCL #400	ड्रैकुला का अंत	Dracula Ka Anth	The End Of Dracula	Two-Hero: Dhruva & Nagraj	Anupam Sinha	Jolly Sinha	Dracula Series- Part 3
95	2003	SPCL #420	कोलाहल	Kolahal	Cacophony	Multistarrer	Anupam Sinha	Jolly Sinha	Dracula Series - The Concluding Part
96	2003	SPCL #435	विषहीन नागराज	Vishheen Nagraj		Solo	Anupam Sinha	Jolly Sinha	
97	2004	SPCL #460	इच्छाधारी चोर	Ichchhadhari Chor		Solo	Anupam Sinha	Jolly Sinha	
98	2004	SPCL #490	खलनायक नागराज	Khalnayak Nagraj		Solo	Anupam Sinha	Jolly Sinha	
99	2004	SPCL #500	सम्राट	Samraat	Emperor	Two Hero: Dhruva & Nagraj	Anupam Sinha	Jolly Sinha	First part of a two-part story
100	2004	SPCL #515	सौडांगी	Soudangi	Soudangi	Two Hero: Dhruva & Nagraj	Anupam Sinha	Jolly Sinha	Concluding part of the two-part story. Cover also features other Raj Comics superheroes, but they are not seen in the issue.
101	2004	SPCL #520	रक्षक नागराज	Rakshak Nagraj		Solo	Anupam Sinha	Jolly Sinha	
102	2004	SPCL #525	सर्वशक्तिमान	Sarv Shaktimaan	Invincible	Multistarrer	Anupam Sinha	Jolly Sinha	
103	2004	SPCL #545	लावा	Lava	Lava	Solo	Anupam Sinha	Jolly Sinha	Part 1
104	2005	SPCL #555	विनाशलीला	Vinashleela		Solo	Anupam Sinha	Jolly Sinha	Part 2
105	2005	SPCL #565	पागल नागराज	Pagal Nagraj		Solo	Anupam Sinha	Jolly Sinha	Part 1
106	2005	SPCL #580	मसीहा	Masiha		Solo	Anupam Sinha	Jolly Sinha	Part 2
107	2005	SPCL #585	चक्र	Chakra	Cycle	Multistarrer	Anupam Sinha	Jolly Sinha	Has photographs of all credited people.
108	2005	SPCL #600	मैड्यूसा	Medusa	Medusa	Multistarrer	Anupam Sinha	Jolly Sinha	
109	2005	SPCL #620	छोटा नागराज	Chota Nagraj		Solo	Anupam Sinha	Jolly Sinha	
110	2005	SPCL #635	सो जा नागराज	So Ja Nagraj		Solo	Anupam Sinha	Jolly Sinha	
111	2006	SPCL #650	शेषनाग	Sheshnag		Solo	Anupam Sinha	Jolly Sinha	
112	2006	SPCL #660	भानुमति का पिटारा	Bhanumati Ka Pitara		Solo	Anupam Sinha	Jolly Sinha	
113	2006	SPCL #670	नागाधीश	Nagadheesh	The Snake Judge	Two Hero: Dhruva & Nagraj	Anupam Sinha	Jolly Sinha	
114	2006	SPCL #680	वर्तमान	Vartmaan	Present	Two Hero: Dhruva & Nagraj	Anupam Sinha	Jolly Sinha	
115	2006	SPCL #700	फ्लेमिना	Flemina	Flemina	Multistarrer	Anupam Sinha	Jolly Sinha	
116	2007	SPCL #2240	फ़ुंकार	Funkaar		Solo	Anupam Sinha	Jolly Sinha	In late 2006, the publishing company decided to combine the serial numbers of all its General(GENL) and Special(SPCL) issues, as a result of which the serial number of the titles jumped from close to 700 to above 2,000.
139	2009	SPCL #2385	नागराज के बाद	Nagraj Ke Bad	Nagraj Ke Bad	Solo	Anupam Sinha	Anupam Sinha, Jolly Sinha	Part 1
140	2009	SPCL #2393	फ़्यूल	Fuel	Fuel	Solo	Anupam Sinha	Anupam Sinha	Part 2
141	2009	SPCL #2395	वीनॉम	Venom	Venom	Solo	Anupam Sinha	Anupam Sinha	Part 3, concluding part of a 3 part series.
149	2010	SPCL #2430	अवशेष	Avshesh	Remains	Two Hero: Dhruva & Nagraj	Anupam Sinha	Anupam Sinha, Jolly Sinha	First part of a three-part story arc
150	2010	SPCL #2445	चुनौती	Chunauti	Dare	Two Hero: Dhruva & Nagraj	Anupam Sinha	Anupam Sinha, Jolly Sinha	Second part of a three-part story arc
151	2010	SPCL #2449	हैड्राॅन	Hedron	Hedron	Two Hero: Dhruva & Nagraj	Anupam Sinha	Anupam Sinha, Jolly Sinha	Concluding part of the 3-part story arc that began in Avshesh
153	2011	SPCL #2455	नागराज है ना	Nagraj Hai Na	Nagraj Hai Na	Solo	Anupam Sinha	Anupam Sinha, Jolly Sinha	Part 1
154	2011	SPCL #2460	क्योँ है नागराज	Kyon Hai Nagraj		Solo	Anupam Sinha	Anupam Sinha, Jolly Sinha	Part 2, concluding part of a 2 part series.
158	2011	SPCL #2475	आदम	Adam		Solo	Anupam Sinha	Anupam Sinha, Jolly Sinha	
162	2012	SPCL #2490	काल कराल	Kaal Karaal		Solo	Anupam Sinha	Jolly Sinha	
163	2013	SPCL #2527	निगेटिव्स	Negatives	Negatives	Multistarrer: Dhruva, Nagraj, Tiranga, Doga & Parmanu	Anupam Sinha	Jolly Sinha	
166	2014	SPCL #2555	ड्रैगन किंग	Dragon King		Solo	Anupam Sinha	Anupam Sinha	Vishwa Rakshak Series.
167	2021	RCMG #2653	सर्प सत्र	Sarp Satra		Two Hero: Nagraj and Tausi	Anupam Sinha	Anupam Sinha	Sarp Satra Series - Part 1
168	2021	RCMG #2669	सर्प द्वंद	Sarp Dwand		Two Hero: Nagraj and Tausi	Anupam Sinha	Anupam Sinha	Sarp Satra Series - Part 2
169	2022	RCMG #2683	सर्प यज्ञ	Sarp Yagya		Two Hero: Nagraj and Tausi	Anupam Sinha	Anupam Sinha	Sarp Satra Series - Part 3
170	2022	RCMG #2718	सर्प युग	Sarp Yug		Two Hero: Nagraj and Tausi	Anupam Sinha	Anupam Sinha	Sarp Satra Series - Part 4
171	2023	RCMG	सर्प काल	Sarp Kaal		Two Hero: Nagraj and Tausi	Anupam Sinha	Anupam Sinha	Sarp Satra Series - Part 5 (Concluding Part)
172	2023	RCMG	शील भंग	Sheelbhang			Anupam Sinha	Nitin Mishra	Sheelbhang #1 - RCMG
173	2023	RCMG	सेतु बंध	Setu Bandh					Sheelbhang #2 - RCMG
174	2023	RCMG	TBA	TBA					Sheelbhang #3 - RCMG
175	2023	RCSG - 41	अर्ध सत्य	Ardha Satya			Anupam Sinha	Nitin Mishra	Sheelbhang #1 - RCSG
176	TBA	TBA		Asatya					Sheelbhang #2 - RCSG
177	TBA	TBA		Shashvat Satya					Sheelbhang #3 - RCSG

=== World Terrorism Series ===
A new series named "Aatankharta Nagraj" or "Nagraj-World Terrorism Series" is being published parallel to the "Nagayana" series. In this series, Nagraj is travelling around the world to fight and eliminate terrorism. "World Terrorism Series" is being written by Mr. Nitin Mishra.

Serial No.	Issue No.	Comic Title	Artist	Author	Notes
1	SPCL #2281	Hari Maut (हरी मौत)	Lalit	Sanjay Gupta, Tarun Kumar Wahi	Origin Series - Set 1
2	SPCL #2255	Zehreela Barood (ज़हरीला बारूद)	Lalit	Sanjay Gupta, Tarun Kumar Wahi	Origin Series - Set 1
3	SPCL #2295	Mamber (माम्बर)	Lalit	Sanjay Gupta, Tarun Kumar Wahi	Origin Series - Set 1
4	SPCL #2300	Numero Uno (न्यूमेरो ऊनो)	Lalit	Sanjay Gupta, Tarun Kumar Wahi	Origin Series - Set 1
5	SPCL #2305	Operation Surgery (ऑप्रेशन सर्जरी)	Lalit	Sanjay Gupta, Tarun Kumar Wahi	Origin Series - Set 1
6	SPCL #2315	Mission Critical (मिशन क्रिटिकल)	Lalit	Sanjay Gupta, Tarun Kumar Wahi	Origin Series - Set 1
7	SPCL #2320	Teen Sikke (तीन सिक्के)	Lalit	Sanjay Gupta, Tarun Kumar Wahi	Origin Series - Set 2
8	SPCL #2325	Jung Maut Tak (जंग मौत तक)	Lalit	Sanjay Gupta, Tarun Kumar Wahi	Origin Series - Set 2
9	SPCL #2350	Under Arrest (अंडर अरेस्ट)	Lalit	Sanjay Gupta, Tarun Kumar Wahi	Origin Series - Set 2
10	SPCL #2360	Omerta (ओमेटर्रा)	Hemant	Sanjay Gupta, Tarun Kumar Wahi	Origin Series - Set 2
11	SPCL #2365	Aankh Micholi (आँख मिचौली)	Hemant	Sanjay Gupta, Tarun Kumar Wahi	Origin Series - Set 2
12	SPCL #2370	Paanchva Shikaar (पांचवां शिकार)	Hemant	Sanjay Gupta, Tarun Kumar Wahi	Origin Series - Set 2
13	SPCL #2375	26/11 (२६/११)	Hemant	Sanjay Gupta, Tarun Kumar Wahi	with Doga
14	SPCL #2400	Ronin (रोनिन)	Hemant	Sanjay Gupta, Tarun Kumar Wahi	Japan Series #1
15	SPCL #2405	Kamikaze (कामीकाजे)	Hemant	Sanjay Gupta, Tarun Kumar Wahi	Japan Series #2
16	SPCL #2410	Tomo (टोमो)	Hemant	Sanjay Gupta, Tarun Kumar Wahi	Japan Series #3
17	SPCL #2415	Shikata Ga Nai (शिकाता गा नाई)	Hemant	Sanjay Gupta, Tarun Kumar Wahi	Japan Series #4
18	SPCL #2452	I-SPY (आई-स्पाई)	Hemant	Nitin Mishra	with Tiranga
19	SPCL #2480	Order of Babel (ऑर्डर ऑफ बेबल)	Hemant	Nitin Mishra	Germany Series #1
20	SPCL #2485	New World Order (न्यू वर्ल्ड ऑर्डर)	Hemant	Nitin Mishra	Germany Series #2
21	SPCL #2518	World War (वर्ल्ड वॉर)	Hemant	Nitin Mishra	Germany Series #3
22	SPCL #2524	Veergati (वीरगति)	Hemant	Nitin Mishra	Germany Series #4
23	SPCL #2587	Kshatipurti (क्षतिपूर्ति)	Hemant	Nitin Mishra	Kshatipoorti Series #1
24	SPCL #2610	Maut Ka Bazigar (मौत का बाजीगर)	Hemant	Nitin Mishra	Kshatipoorti Series #2
25	SPCL #2634	Vishparast (विषपरस्त)	Hemant	Nitin Mishra	Kshatipoorti Series #3
26	TBP	Vishharta (विषहर्ता)			Kshatipoorti Series #4

=== Narak Nashak Nagraj ===
Serial No.	Issue No.	Comic Title	Artist	Author	Series
1	SPCL #2396	HallaBol (हल्ला बोल)	Studio Image	Sanjay Gupta, Tarun Kumar Wahi, Vivek Mohan	with Doga
2	SPCL #2425	Abhishapt (अभिशप्त)	Hemant	Sanjay Gupta, Tarun Kumar Wahi	with Doga & Bheriya
3	SPCL #2450	Adamkhor (आदमखोर)	Hemant	Sanjay Gupta, Tarun Kumar Wahi, Mandaar Gangale	
4	SPCL #2464	Infected (इन्फेक्टेड)	Hemant	Nitin Mishra	
5	SPCL #2470	Mrityujivi (मृत्युजीवी)	Hemant	Nitin Mishra	
6	SPCL #2500	Maqbara (मक़बरा)	Hemant Kumar	Nitin Mishra	prequel to Utpatti Shrankhala
7	SPCL #2515	Takshak (तक्षक)	Hemant Kumar	Nitin Mishra	prequel to Utpatti Shrankhala
8	SPCL #2534	Narak Nashak (नरक नाशक)	Hemant Kumar	Nitin Mishra	Utpatti Shrankhala #1
9	SPCL #2543	Narak Niyati (नरक नियति)	Hemant Kumar	Nitin Mishra	Utpatti Shrankhala #2
10	SPCL #2554	Narak Dansh (नरक दंश)	Hemant Kumar	Nitin Mishra	Utpatti Shrankhala #3
11	SPCL #2578	Narak Ahuti (नरक आहूति)	Hemant Kumar	Nitin Mishra	Utpatti Shrankhala #4

=== Raj Comics By Sanjay Gupta ===
In October 2020, Raj Comics had a split and got divided into 3 different entities. One being Raj Comics By Sanjay Gupta and other being Raj Comics By Manoj Gupta, and Raj Comics By Manish Gupta.

Issue No.	Year	Comic Title	Artist	Author	Hero	Series	Notes
2	2021	Naag Pralay	Adil Khan Pathan	Nitin Mishra	Nagraj & Tausi	Pralay Ka Devta #1	Chronicles Nagraj's journey immediately after the events of GENL #33 "Nagraj Aur Shango". The first five issues of Nagraj Series viz. (Nagraj, Nagraj Ki Kabra, Nagraj Ka Badla, Nagraj Ki Hongkong Yatra, Nagraj Aur Shango) were rebranded as Nagraj Yugarambh.
16	2022	Naag Pralop	Adil Khan Pathan	Nitin Mishra	Nagraj & Tausi	Pralay Ka Devta #2	Chronicles Nagraj's journey immediately after the events of GENL #33 "Nagraj Aur Shango". The first five issues of Nagraj Series viz. (Nagraj, Nagraj Ki Kabra, Nagraj Ka Badla, Nagraj Ki Hongkong Yatra, Nagraj Aur Shango) were rebranded as Nagraj Yugarambh.
TBA	TBA	Naag Pratisodh				Pralay Ka Devta #3	Chronicles Nagraj's journey immediately after the events of GENL #33 "Nagraj Aur Shango". The first five issues of Nagraj Series viz. (Nagraj, Nagraj Ki Kabra, Nagraj Ka Badla, Nagraj Ki Hongkong Yatra, Nagraj Aur Shango) were rebranded as Nagraj Yugarambh.
TBA	TBA	Naag Pratighat				Pralay Ka Devta #4	Chronicles Nagraj's journey immediately after the events of GENL #33 "Nagraj Aur Shango". The first five issues of Nagraj Series viz. (Nagraj, Nagraj Ki Kabra, Nagraj Ka Badla, Nagraj Ki Hongkong Yatra, Nagraj Aur Shango) were rebranded as Nagraj Yugarambh.

Issue No.	YEAR	Comic Title	Artist	Author	Series	Notes
1	2021	Aadi Parv (आदि पर्व)	Hemant Kumar	Nitin Mishra	Naag Granth # 01	Story after the events of Utpatti Shrankhala Series
3	2022	Naag Parv (नाग पर्व)	Hemant Kumar	Nitin Mishra	Naag Granth # 02	Story after the events of Utpatti Shrankhala Series
5	2022	Aranyak Parv (आरण्यक पर्व)	Hemant Kumar	Nitin Mishra	Naag Granth # 03	Story after the events of Utpatti Shrankhala Series
TBA	2023	Halahal Parv	Hemant Kumar	Nitin Mishra	Naag Granth # 04	Story after the events of Utpatti Shrankhala Series
TBA	2023	Virat Parv (विराट पर्व)	Hemant Kumar	Nitin Mishra	Naag Granth # 05	Story after the events of Utpatti Shrankhala Series

=== Amazing friends of Nagraj ===
Serial No.	Published Year	Issue No.	Comic Title	Series	Artist	Author
1	2009	SPCL #2381	Adhura Prem (अधूरा प्रेम)	Shooldharini Saudangi	Ved Prakash Khantwal	Vivek Mohan
2	2009	SPCL #2382	Milan Yamini	Amar yoddha Kaldoot	Hemant	Vivek Mohan
3	2009	SPCL #2383	Nagjyoti	Nag virangana Visarpi	Sushant Panda	Vivek Mohan
4	2009	SPCL #2384	Panchnag	Durdamya sena Panchnag	Moin Khan	Vivek Mohan
5	2010	SPCL #2426	Ambreesh	Nag virangana Visarpi	Narayan	Vivek Mohan
6	2010	SPCL #2427	Fairo	Shooldharini Saudangi	Sushant Panda	Vivek Mohan
7	2010	SPCL #2428	Vishya	Amar yoddha Kaldoot	Narayan	Vivek Mohan
8	2010	SPCL #2429	Pratishodh	Durdamya sena Panchnag	Narayan	Vivek Mohan
9	2010	SPCL #2431	Kobraak	Nag virangana Visarpi	Narayan	Vivek Mohan
10	2010	SPCL #2432	Shrap	Shooldharini Saudangi	Narayan	Vivek Mohan
11	2010	SPCL #2433	Param Vishya	Amar yoddha Kaldoot	Dildeep Singh	Vivek Mohan
12	2010	SPCL #2434	Parajay	Durdamya sena Panchnag	Hemant	Vivek Mohan
13	2011	SPCL #2436	Pagal Nagin	Nag virangana Visarpi	Jung Bahadur	Vivek Mohan
14	2011	SPCL #2437	Dev Kanya	Shooldharini Saudangi	Dildeep Singh	Vivek Mohan
15	2011	SPCL #2438	Kaal Sarp	Amar yoddha Kaldoot	Dildeep Singh	Vivek Mohan
16	2011	SPCL #2439	Ranneeti	Durdamya sena Panchnag	Jung Bahdur	Vivek Mohan
17	2011	SPCL #2458	Yugal Srishti	Amar yoddha Kaldoot	Siddharth Panwar	Vivek Mohan

=== Nagayana ===
It was first intended to be a four-part mini-series, but later, the series was extended to include more issues. It's a story based on a hypothetical future world casting Nagraj and Super Commando Dhruva 25 years into the future. Largely based on Hindu epic Ramayana, the story narrowly follows the same storyline as of the epic, but with Raj Comics characters filling in the places of original characters. The reason for the extension of the mini-series was to tell various sub-plots and the series was finally declared to be an eight-part series. The last part is Iti Kaand, which is a 128-page issue released on 10 March 2009. The new series is as follows

Issue No.	Comic Title
1	Varan Kaand (वरण कांड)
2	Grahan Kaand (ग्रहण कांड)
3	Haran Kaand (हरण कांड)
4	Sharan Kaand (शरण कांड)
5	Dahan Kaand (दहन कांड)
6	Rann Kaand (रण कांड)
7	Samar Kaand (समर कांड)
8	Iti Kaand (इति कांड)
9	Upsanhaar(उपसंहार)

=== Mahanagayana ===
1.	Mahanagayan : Avtaran Parv	2022
2.	Mahanagayan : Rakt Parv	2023
3.	Mahanagayan : Sandhi Parv	2024
4.	Mahanagayan : Bali Parv	2025
5.	Mahanagayan : Agyat Parv	2026

=== Sarvanayak Series ===
One of the series by Raj Comics which is trying to bring almost all the characters by Raj Comics in a single narrative.

Serial No.	Issue No.	Comic Title	Artist	Author
0	SPCL #2528	Yugandhar	Lalit Singh, Nitin Mishra	Nitin Mishra, Tarun Kumar Wahi
1	SPCL #2535	Sarvyugam	Dheeraj Verma	Nitin Mishra
2	SPCL #2551	Sarvdaman	Dheeraj Verma	Nitin Mishra
3	SPCL #2559	Sarvsangram	Sushant Panda	Nitin Mishra
4	SPCL #2576	Sarvsanhaar	Sushant Panda, Nitin Mishra	Nitin Mishra
5	SPCL #2584	Sarvmanthan	Sushant Panda, Anupam Sinha, Hemant Kumar	Nitin Mishra
6	SPCL #2595	Sarvsandhi	Sushant Panda, Hemant Kumar	Nitin Mishra
7	SPCL #2605	Sarvkranti	Sushant Panda, Hemant Kumar	Nitin Mishra
8	SPCL #2615	Sarvshakti	Sushant Panda, Hemant Kumar	Nitin Mishra
9	SPCL #2621	Sarvagaman	Hemant Kumar	Nitin Mishra
10	SPCL #2624	Sarvvyooh	Hemant Kumar	Nitin Mishra
11	SPCL #2627	Sarvpralay	Hemant Kumar	Nitin Mishra
12	SPCL #2635	Sarvran	Hemant Kumar, Stuti Mishra	Nitin Mishra
13	SPCL #2693	Sarvgrahan	Hemant Kumar	Nitin Mishra
14	SPCL #2695	Sarvyuddh	Hemant Kumar	Nitin Mishra
15	TBP	Sarvsamar	Hemant Kumar	Nitin Mishra

Sarvanayak series is complemented by another ongoing series 'Sarvnayak Vistar' which also features Vishwarakshak Nagraj. The comics in Sarvanayak Vistar series are as follows -

Serial No.	Issue No.	Comic Title	Artist	Author
1	SPCL #2585	Maut ka Marathon	Hemant Kumar	Anurag Kumar Singh
2	SPCL #2597	Vishputron ka Agaman	Hemant Kumar	Anurag Kumar Singh
3	SPCL #2606	Vishksetra Sanrakshanam	Hemant Kumar	Anurag Kumar Singh
4	SPCL #2614	Swarnnagri ki Tabahi	Hemant Kumar	Nitin Mishra
5	SPCL #2636	Prakoshth Ke Kaidi		
6	TBP	Ret Ka Shahenshah		

=== Special Comics ===
A free special comics of Nagraj under the title ' Nagraj Strikes: The Attack of Coronaman' with serial no. #Covid-19 was launched on Facebook page to raise awareness about the ongoing pandemic of COVID-19. The comics had art by Aswin Amarnath R and story by Manoj Gupta and Ayush Gupta.

== Alternate media ==
Numerous attempts have been made by Raj Comics to expand Nagraj into other media. However most attempts have been unfruitful. In the late 1990s, Raj Comics tried adapting Nagraj into a live-action television show in India. A few episodes were shot. However, the show never made it to the television screen. The three episodes that were made are available on CDs, which were distributed freely as an attachment to digest-sized comic editions. (Khalnayak Nagraj, Samraat, and Saudangi).

Nagraj was also set to feature in a proposed animated television series. Once again the show never made it to the television screen. An episodic series was in works, and a teaser was uploaded on YouTube featuring Nagraj and his arch enemy Jadugar Shakoora. However, since then there has been no news about the series. It is assumed that production has stopped because the production company Rtoonz's website has since disappeared.

In November 2007, an agreement was signed between Motion Picture Corporation and Raj Comics to produce a high quality 2D Movie featuring Nagraj.

Also in 2011, 2012, 2013, 2017, and 2021, five animated films based on Nagraj were released. They were written by the RSS Brothers and directed by Shashikanth Ramawat. Three of the films finally aired on Cartoon Network India in 2015 while the last two aired on that channel in 2019 and 2021. The films' names were My Name is Raj: Raj aur Asudama Ki Ladal, My Name is Raj: Raj Ki Nayi Chunatiyaan, My Name is Raj: Attack of the Demons, My Name is Raj: Vizukama Ki Tazar, and My Name is Raj: Return of Zohak. In all of the films, Shekar Ramwat starred as Raj.

It was, however, reported in 2019, that Indian actor Ranveer Singh could play Nagraj, in a film produced by Karan Johar. Raj Comics president Manoj Gupta also expressed his happiness on the same.

In February 2020 Bhojpuri star Yash announced on his birthday that he will make movie on issue no.71 Nagraj Aur vishkanya Starring Yash as nagraj while Nidhi raj will play Vishkanya as main antagonist. Its first look was shared on web platform gaining positive feedback.
