= Benjamin Milliken II =

Benjamin Milliken II U.E. (1794 in Bocabec, New Brunswick – 1863 in Township of Markham, Canada West, Province of Canada) was a United Empire Loyalist, farmer and soldier who lived in Markham Township, York County, Upper Canada in the nineteenth century.

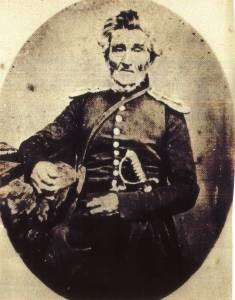
Major Benjamin Milliken II of Milliken's Corners, Township of Markham, Upper Canada

== Early life ==
Milliken was the son of a successful Upper Canada lumber merchant and tavern keeper, American Loyalist Norman Milliken (1771–1843), after whom the community of Milliken, Ontario, formerly Milliken Corners founded 1807, may be named. He started life as a millman and subsequently became a farmer in the Township of Markham.

== Military service and citizen soldier ==
Milliken had a distinguished military career in the British colony of Upper Canada. He served as a private in Battalion No. 9 of the South Division of the First Regiment of the York Militia during the War of 1812 at the age of 18 under Captain James Fenwick and saw action at the Battle of Queenston Heights under General Sir Isaac Brock. During the 1837 Upper Canada Rebellion, Milliken continued his militia service in the First Regiment in the York Militia, received a Captain's commission and ultimately attained the rank of Major.

== Later life ==
In 1851, Milliken donated the land and built one of the first schools in the Milliken Corners area (School Section #8) which is now the location of Hagerman Corner School (now The School Fine Dining) building built in 1888. He hosted agricultural fairs on his farm during the 1860s and was an active member of the (Milliken Corners) Methodist Church. He was made a Justice of the Peace in York County, Upper Canada out of recognition of his militia service.

== Benjamin Milliken House ==
Circa 1855, Benjamin Milliken constructed a Georgian Classic Revival house on his farm located on Part of Lot 5, Concession 5 Markham Township that was designated as a historical structure under the Ontario Heritage Act in 1994. Benjamin Milliken House located at 7710 Kennedy Road, Markham is currently occupied by a pub called The Major Milliken.

== See also ==
- Benjamin Milliken
- Milliken, Ontario
- Norman Milliken
- Upper Canada Rebellion
- Rebellions of 1837
- War of 1812
