= Milliken Creek =

Milliken Creek may refer to:

- Milliken Creek (California), a stream in Napa County, United States
- Milliken Creek (Minnesota), a stream in Dodge County, United States
