= Mulock, Ontario =

Mulock, Ontario may refer to:

- Mulock Township, a geographic township in Nipissing District
- Mulock, Nipissing District, a dispersed rural community and unincorporated place in geographic Mulock Township, Nipissing District
- Mulock, Grey County, a dispersed rural community and unincorporated place in the municipality of West Grey, Grey County
