= Milind Mulick =

Indian watercolour artist

Milind Mulick (Marathi: मिलिंद मुळीक) is a watercolour artist based in Pune, India. His work has been shown at exhibitions internationally as well as all over India. He has had an influence on many art school students.

Mulick has authored many books on painting and also teaches painting in India and internationally.

== Family and early life ==
Milind is the son of famed Indian illustrator and comics artist Pratap Mulick. He started painting when he was five years old, and at the age of thirteen his watercolour landscapes earned him the National Talent Scholarship to study painting. Mulick graduated in engineering in the College of Engineering, Pune. He states that his engineering course has helped him to analyse methods of painting and has benefitted his watercolour technique.

== Career ==
After graduating, he worked as an illustrator for an architectural firm for about fifteen years while still pursuing watercolour painting, and became a full-time artist in 1995 with an exhibition in Pune. He has since had solo exhibitions in Mumbai, Sweden, France, Spain, Singapore, Mauritius and Russia. His paintings are in demand for corporate offices and private collectors in the US, Europe, Japan and Singapore, and have been selected for numerous watercolour society exhibitions including three consecutive years with the American Watercolor Society.

Mulick runs watercolour classes and workshops in India, Europe and locations in Asia. He also gives watercolour demonstrations at government art colleges in Maharashtra.

== Books ==
Mulick has written twelve books in both English and Marathi, including books explaining watercolour techniques in a simple way, to fill a perceived gap in the market. His first book, Watercolour, published in 2000 in both English and Marathi, has now sold over 100,000 copies.

The English editions of his books are:

- Watercolour, ISBN 9788179251119, 2nd edition, 15th reprint
- Watercolour Landscapes Step by Step, ISBN 9788179253953, including a DVD of demonstrations, 1st edition, 8th reprint
- Sketchbook, ISBN 9788179251034, 1st edition, 12th reprint
- Milind Mulick @HOME, ISBN 9788179252833, 1st edition
- Methods and Techniques - Opaque Colour, ISBN 9788179252949, 2nd edition, 3rd reprint
- Natural Inspiration, ISBN 9788179253007, 1st edition, 2nd reprint
- Watercolour Demonstrations, ISBN 9788179253656, 1st edition, 2nd reprint
- Perspective, ISBN 9788179253786, 1st edition, 10th reprint
- Expressions In Watercolour , ISBN 9788179254387, 2nd edition
- Varanasi - An artist's impression, ISBN 9788179254998, 1st edition, 1st reprint
- Watercolour Paintings with Photo References, ISBN 9788179255377, 1st edition
- Journey so far..., ISBN 9788194421344, 1st edition

== Music ==
Mulick was one of the three founder members of the rock band The Strangers, formed in 1982. He was lead vocalist and played the guitar. They won the inter-collegiate rock music contest Livewire in Mumbai in 1984 and went on to play at college and corporate events across India.
