= Benjamin Milliken =

American Loyalist landowner

- Born: 1728; Boston, Province of Massachusetts Bay
- Died: 1791 (aged 62–63); Bocabec, New Brunswick
- Occupations: American Loyalist, landowner, mill and ship owner
- Spouse: Phebe
- Relatives: Norman Milliken, son

Benjamin Milliken (born 1728 Boston, Province of Massachusetts Bay died 1791 Bocabec, New Brunswick) was an American Loyalist. He was the son of the Honourable Edward Milliken (born 1706 Boston), a Justice of the Court of Common Pleas (retired 1773) in the Province of Massachusetts Bay and his wife Abigail Norman (1710–1751), major landowner, mill and ship owner in Maine in the Province of Massachusetts Bay. He was the founder of Ellsworth, Maine (first called the Union River Settlement) in 1763, laid out and received the land grant for the Township of Bridgton, Maine (originally called Pondicherry) in 1765 and was one of the first settlers in Bocabec and St. Andrew's, New Brunswick in 1784.

== Early life ==
He was born in Boston in 1728 to the Honourable Edward Milliken, Justice of the Court of Common Pleas, and his wife Abigail Norman.

== Business career ==
He began his somewhat remarkable business career in his native town of Scarborough, Maine, where he owned a large gambrel-roofed house, and had a store in which he traded, on Dunstan Landing Road. He was granted lands in Rowley-Canada (near Rindge, New Hampshire), which had been granted to soldiers, or heirs of soldiers, who had served in the Battle of Quebec (1690); but when the boundary line between Massachusetts and New Hampshire was run out and established, these lands were found to have been in the latter province, and he, with other petitioners, was granted, in 1761, a township seven miles square, east of the Saco River, in lieu of that of which they had been dispossessed.

Milliken was one of three who proceeded to lay out the township named "Pondicherry," now Bridgton, Me., and on presenting a plan of the same to the General Court they obtained confirmation of said grant, June 25, 1765. Finding the timber on these lands too remote from a market, Benjamin Milliken sold out his share and invested in lands next to the lands purchased from William Maxfield on the Union River, and made that locality the seat of his lumbering business. He had lost his lands and other property in Scarborough by foreclosure of a mortgage held by Wheelwright & Althrope of New York, and in 1764 made Trenton, Maine his headquarters. He was granted a mill privilege there with timber lands adjoining, and with his wife and daughter and thirty men went down in a vessel owned by Ephraim Dyer, and built a saw-mill on a small stream that empties into Union River. The condition of his grant required him to have his mill fit for service within six months from the date, Aug. 1, 1764, and as it was raised between Sept. 2 and Oct. 12 of that year, he fulfilled his contract.

In his deposition, given in 1796, Ephraim Dyer testified that he carried down about four hundred pounds' worth of provisions and other stores; that he remained and helped the Millikens near a fortnight, during which time the men made use of his vessel to live in until they had built a house. This "house" was but a rude camp built against a huge boulder named by an early surveyor the "Punch Bowl; " and a daughter of Benjamin Millliken, then only fourteen years of age, afterwards Mrs. Lord, cooked the first meal ever prepared by a woman European settler in the township.

As there were thirty-two workmen employed on the mill, a large quantity of food must have been consumed; and as Ephraim Dyer said two women went down from Scarborough in the vessel with the builders, it has been assumed that one of them was the mother of the maid who first put the kettle on: but the records prove that this was not the fact, for her father married Elizabeth Banks in 1754, only ten years before the mill was built, and would not have had a daughter by her fourteen years of age at that time. Abigail Milliken, daughter of Sarah Smith, Benjamin's first wife, was b. in 1750, and was just fourteen when the mill was erected, and if the statements and dates are correctly given— and there are excellent authorities to verify them—this daughter was the first to prepare food in Trenton, now Ellsworth.

Milliken and his brother Thomas Milliken built a dam and saw mill on the Union River at or near the head of the tide, close to where the Bangor Hydro Dam exists. It may have been tidal powered but proved a failure was called the " Folly Mill," and was soon abandoned.

Afterwards the Benjamin and Thomas Milliken built a double saw-mill on the Union River at what became the Union River Settlement ( now Ellsworth, Maine) of which City Benjamin Milliken is acknowledged the founder. When the second dam was built by the Millikens, they were either unable to build the whole or sold the rights to the western bank, and the settlers on the west side of the Union River, John Murch and Benjamin Joy built a mill. The Ellsworth hydro-electric dam begun in 1907 is located at the site of one of the original Benjamin Milliken Union River dams.Afterwards they built a double saw-mill on another water power, and there the Millikens carried on their lumber business successfully many years. They owned vessels, and shipped much of the manufactured lumber to Connecticut and sold it.

The first schooner built in Ellsworth in 1773 was the Susan and Abigail, named after Benjamin Millikens daughter Abigail Milliken and Susan Joy the daughter of Benjamin Joy.

== American War of Independence ==
American rebels called Milliken "Royalist Ben", "Tory Ben" and "Runaway Ben" as he expressed Tory sentiments when the American War of Independence broke out and was a loyal supporter of King George III. He first joined the British at Bagaduce, on Penobscot Bay (now Castine, Maine) after his home, grist & saw mills and farm, were destroyed by rebel forces.

During the early years of the American War of Independence he served as a pilot on British Ships and transported lumber and supplies to a British garrison under the command of a General Francis McLean at Fort Majebigwaduce (Castine, Maine) .

He was taken prisoner at Castine in July 1779 by rebel Colonel John Allan and a band of Native Americans who put him in irons. He was imprisoned on board the rebel frigate USS Warren part of the fleet that commenced the Siege of Penobscot (Penobscot Expedition). British troops constructed Fort George while fighting the American rebels for three weeks, during which time Benjamin Milliken was held prisoner.

During the siege, Milliken's house was plundered by American rebels. A group of rebels led by an officer entered the house and attempted to force their way into Milliken's wife Phebe's bedroom where the silver plate and other valuables were concealed. One of the Milliken's female domestics placed her hand upon the latch of the door, the officer drew his sword and nearly severed her fingers, she stood firm holding up her dripping hand before her face, saying, "There, sir, is better blood than runs in your veins". The rebels ransacked the house and then drove the cattle belonging to the Milliken estate into the kitchen and slaughtered them, leaving the offal in the floor.

On the twenty-first day of the Penobscot Siege, on August 14, 1779, three British frigates of war commanded by Sir George Collier arrived. The American fleet unable to escape ran their boats ashore up the Penobscot River, released their prisoners including Benjamin Milliken, set fire to their fleet and escaped by foot into the woods. It was the greatest loss in American Naval history until Pearl Harbor.

== Later years ==
All of Milliken's property was confiscated by the American authorities and he moved to New Brunswick in 1782–1783. On Aug. 12, 1784, he, with about one hundred others, known as the Penobscot Associated Loyalists, received two grants of land from the British Crown called the Penobscot Association Grant. Their town grant comprised the town plot of St. Andrew's New Brunswick and their farm lots under separate grants included several tracts extending from Bocabec westerly along the coast to St. Stephen, with an additional tract on the St. Croix River above what is now St. Stephen, New Brunswick (formerly Milltown). Shortly after these lands were granted Milliken left St. Andrew's and moved to Bocabec, New Brunswick on the shore of Passamaquoddy Bay near St. Andrew's where he built a shipyard and lived out the remainder of his life.

He was a pioneer settler three times in British North America starting in Scarborough, Maine, then on the Union River as the founder of Ellsworth, Maine and then in St. Andrew's and Bocabec, New Brunswick.

== See also ==
- American Loyalist
- American War of Independence
- Benjamin Milliken II
- Norman Milliken
- Ellsworth, Maine
