= Larry Harmon Pictures =

Defunct American production company

- Founded: c. 1957
- Founder: Larry Harmon
- Defunct: 2021
- Key people: Larry Harmon; Ervin Kaplan; Lou Scheimer; Hal Sutherland; Cal Dalton

Larry Harmon Pictures was the production company of Larry Harmon, who had acquired the rights to the character Bozo the Clown. The company produced cartoons featuring Bozo the Clown, as well as Popeye, Mr. Magoo, Dick Tracy and Laurel & Hardy. The staff at the studio included former Disney animator Hal Sutherland and Lou Scheimer. After Harmon exited the animation business, Scheimer and Sutherland, along with producer Norm Prescott, formed Filmation, which went on to be a leading producer of television animation. Larry Harmon Pictures continued to operate as a holding company for some of the programs it had produced.

The company, which remained active after Harmon's death, sold the rights to Bozo the Clown to David Arquette in 2021.
