= Norman Milliken =

- Born: July 11, 1771; Trenton, Province of Massachusetts Bay, British America
- Died: February 2, 1843 (aged 71); Markham, Province of Canada
- Resting place: Hagerman Cemetery, Markham
- Spouse: Susannah Walton
- Children: 12
- Parent(s): Benjamin Milliken, Phebe Milliken

Norman Milliken (July 11, 1771 Trenton, Province of Massachusetts Bay – February 2, 1843 Markham, Province of Canada) was a loyalist, farmer, lumber mill owner and hotel/tavern keeper in York County, Ontario. The community of Milliken Mills in Markham, Ontario is named after him.

== Biography ==
=== Early life ===
Norman Milliken was one of 7 children born to Benjamin and Phebe Milliken. He moved to Bocabec, New Brunswick with his father American Loyalist Benjamin Milliken in 1782-1791 after the American War of Independence. In 1803, he left Bocabec and moved to Pennsylvania. He returned to Bocabec in 1805, and then moved to York, Upper Canada and began milling.

He married Susannah Walton in Bocebec, New Brunswick, Canada. In 1794, his son, Benjamin Milliken II was born in New Brunswick. He had twelve children.

==== Milliken's Corners ====
The rural hamlet of "Milliken's Corners" was first settled in 1798 by William Dumont. Norman Milliken settled in the area around 1807.

In 1807, he founded a small hamlet in Markham, Ontario. Norman, along with two of his brothers established a lumbering business with a contract that supplied the Royal Navy with ship's planking and lumber. For mill work, he used one of the first lumber Mills in the Township of Markham known as "German Mills" and also rented a flour mill on the west side of Yonge Street for milling lumber. He subsequently purchased a share in a lumber mill located at Markham Village.

Miiliken and his brothers also built a hotel, reputedly to control the drinking habits of the lumbermen, and livery stables. Norman's daughter Charlotte ran the hotel for her father.

In 1814 Norman Milliken received the deed for 200 acres of land at lot 1, concession 5, Markham Township which was the location of Milliken Corners. The rural hamlet of Milliken's Corners eventually consisted of Milliken's Corners Methodist Church (at south east corner of Brimley and Steeles merged to form Ebenezer Presbyterian Church on northwest corner), a post office which was established 1858 (northeast corner of Old Kennedy Road and Steeles), a hotel and a general store. The hamlet became a postal village in 1858 and was called Milliken after Norman Millken.

== Legacy ==
Norman Milliken is the namesake for Milliken, Ontario and Milliken Mills in Markham, including Milliken Mills Public School and Milliken Mills High School, with the name derived from mills owned and/or operated by Milliken. The Milliken name is also associated with the Township of Markham. The name surname "Millikin" is likely derived from the double diminutive of 'mael-oc-an' meaning "the little bald or shaved one." The hamlet remained a rural community until the 1980s. In the 1980s urbanization had developed in the area and farming stopped.

== See also ==
- Milliken, Ontario
- Milliken Mills High School
- Benjamin Milliken II
