= Pratap Mullick =

Indian illustrator and comics artist (1936–2007)

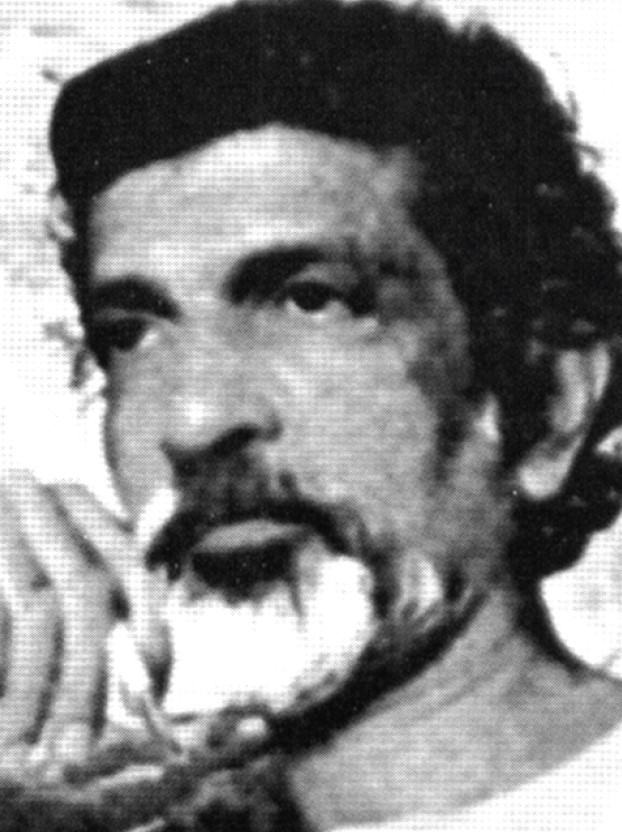
- Born: 1 July 1936; Kolhapur, Maharashtra, British India
- Died: 18 June 2007 (aged 70); Pune, Maharashtra, India
- Known for: Illustration; Comic book art
- Children: Milind Mulick

Pratap Mullick (1 July 1936 – 18 June 2007) was an Indian illustrator and comics artist. He was best known for illustrating Nagraj of Raj Comics which gained lot of popularity under him and was later handed to Anupam Sinha who made Nagraj an actual superhero. He worked for the Indian comic book series Amar Chitra Katha created by writer and editor Anant Pai. Mullick drew the first 50 issues of Nagraj from 1986 until 1995. He designed the comic-book character Supremo (based on movie star Amitabh Bachchan), who featured in a series published for two years in the 1980s.

== Early life and career ==
Mullick was born on 1 July 1936. As a veteran illustrator, Mullick ran his own comics studio and training workshop in Pune. He was also the author of an art-instruction book Sketching, which according to the publisher's website is "a condensation of Pratap Mulick’s life-long devotion to figure drawing and illustration". A blurb on the book claims that 1,00,000 copies have been sold till date.

Sanjay Gupta studio head and co-founder of Raj Comics shared his work experience with Pratap Mulick, during an interview with CulturePOPcorn.

Karline McLain, a researcher who worked at the Amar Chitra Katha production offices, wrote a book which discusses the work of Amar Chitra Katha artists and records conversations with Pratap Mullick.

== Personal life and death ==
Mulick died in Pune, Maharashtra on 18 June 2007, at the age of 70. His son, Milind Mulick, is a well known watercolour artist based in Pune.

== Work ==
=== As Author and illustrator ===
- Sketching by Pratap Mullick (Jyotsna Prakashan)

== Awards and recognition ==
Mullick was featured as Indian comics legend creative in the Legend Calendar 2019 released by Comix Theory in January 2019. He is featured on the front cover of the legend calendar.
