= Millikan =

Millikan (/ˈmɪlɪkən/; Irish: Ó Maoileagáin) may refer to:

== People ==
- Bud Millikan (1920–2010), Maryland Terrapins head basketball coach 1950–1967
- Clark Blanchard Millikan (1903–1966), American professor of aeronautics and son of Robert Andrews Millikan
- Glenn Allan Millikan (1906–1947), American physiologist, inventor of Millikan oximeter and son of Robert Andrews Millikan
- Joe Millikan (born 1950), American racecar driver
- Max Millikan (1913–1969), American economist
- Robert Andrews Millikan (1868–1953), American Nobel Prize–winning physicist
  - Millikan oil drop experiment
- Ruth Millikan (born 1933), American philosopher of biology, psychology, and language
- Edward E. Simmons (1911–2004), aka "Millikan Man"

== Other ==
- Millikan (crater), on the Moon
- Millikan High School, Long Beach, California
- Millikan Middle School, Los Angeles Unified School District
- Millikan Way station, on the MAX Blue Line in Washington County, Oregon

== See also ==
- Millican (disambiguation)
- Milligan (disambiguation)
- Milliken (disambiguation)
- Millikin (disambiguation)
- Robert A. Millikan House, Chicago, Illinois
