= Millikin =

Millikin may refer to:

== People ==
=== Surname ===
- Anna Millikin (1764 – c. 1849), teacher and author
- Earl Millikin (1890–1970), the Mayor of Seattle, Washington 1941–1942
- Eric Millikin, American contemporary artist and activist based in Detroit, Michigan
- Eugene Millikin (1891–1958), United States Senator from Colorado
- Hugh Millikin (born 1957), Australian curler originally from Ottawa, Ontario
- James Millikin (1827–1909), the founder of Millikin University in Decatur, Illinois
- John M. Millikin (1804–1884), Republican politician in the state of Ohio
- John Millikin (1888–1970), senior United States Army officer during World War II

=== Given name ===
- James Millikin Bevans, Major General in the United States Air Force
- Charlotte Millikin Hoak (1874–1967), teacher, horticulturist, botanist, garden columnist in Southern California

== Other ==
- Millikin University, American co-educational comprehensive private university in Decatur, Illinois, United States
- Millikin Big Blue, the intercollegiate athletic programs of Millikin University

== See also ==
- James Millikin House, a historic house in Decatur, Illinois
- Milik
- Milki
- Millikan (disambiguation)
- Milliken (disambiguation)
- Milliskin
