= List of comics creators =

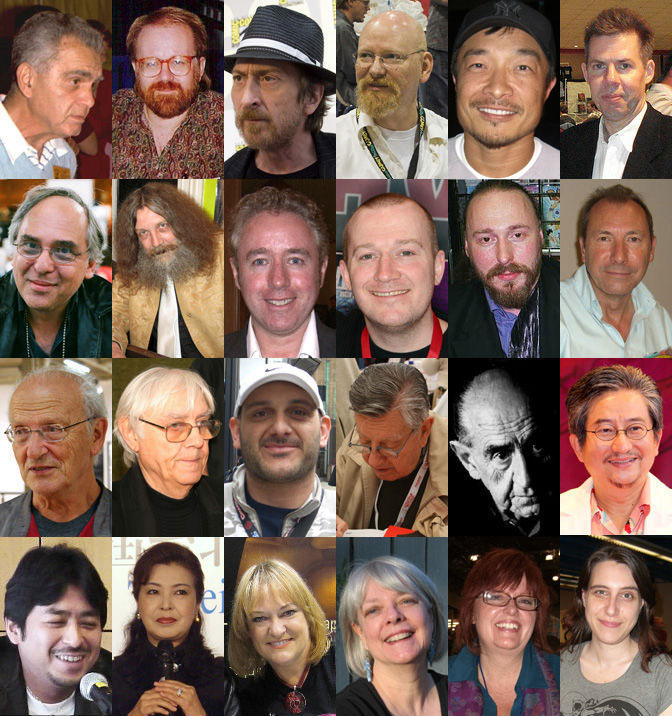
1. Jack Kirby, John Byrne, Frank Miller, Art Adams, Jim Lee, Dave Sim.; 2. Art Spiegelman, Alan Moore, Mark Millar, Garth Ennis, Warren Ellis, David Lloyd.; 3. Jean "Moebius" Giraud, Milo Manara, Simone Bianchi, Francisco Solano López, Alberto Breccia, Go Nagai.; 4. Kazuki Takahashi, Riyoko Ikeda, Wendy Pini, Louise Simonson, Gail Simone, Valerie D'Orazio.

This is a list of comics creators. Although comics have different formats, this list mainly focuses on comic book and graphic novel creators. However, some creators of comic strips are also found here, as are some of the early innovators of the art form.

The list is sorted by the country of origin of the authors, although they may have published, or now be resident in other countries.

== Argentina ==
- Horacio Altuna - (El Loco Chavez)
- Ricardo Barreiro - (As de Pique, El Eternauta, Bárbara)
- Roberto Battaglia - (Don Pascual)
- Oscar Blotta - (Ventajita)
- Alberto Breccia (born in Uruguay) - (Mort Cinder, El Eternauta)
- Enrique Breccia - (La Vida del Che, Swamp Thing)
- Maitena Burundarena - (Flo, Mujeres Alteradas, Superadas)
- Alberto Cognigni - (Negrazón and Chaveta)
- Copi - (La Femme Assise, Les Poulets N'ont Pas de Chaise)
- Guillermo Divito - (Bombolo, Pochita Morfoni, El Doctor Merengue, Fulmine, Fallutelli, Divito Girls)
- Cristian Dzwonik - (Gaturro)
- Eduardo Ferro - (Don Pitazo, Asserín y Pan Rallado, Langostino, Bólido, Tara Service, Pandora, Pampa Barbara, Chapaleo, continued El Fantasma Benito), died at age 93.
- Roberto Fontanarrosa
- Nestor Gonzalez Fossat - (Jimmy y su Pupilo, Aventuras de Menucho, Firulete y Retacón, Goyito y Goyita)
- Arnoldo Franchoni, aka Francho - (Cándido, Album De Familia, Camotito, Historias De Cinco Guitas, Los Tres Malditos, made comics for Cracked and Mad)
- Marcelo Frusin - (Hellblazer, Loveless)
- Juan Gimenez
- Arturo Lanteri - (Les Aventuras de Negro Raúl, Don Pancho Talero and Anacleto).
- Liniers - (Macanudo)
- Carlos Loiseau, aka Caloi - (Clemente)
- Francisco Solano López - (El Eternauta, Janus Stark)
- Jorge Lucas
- Domingo Roberto Mandrafina - (Spaghetti Brothers)
- Adolfo Mazzone - (Piantadino)
- Guillermo Mordillo
- José Antonio Muñoz - (Alack Sinner)
- Fabian Nicieza - (Deadpool)
- Héctor Germán Oesterheld - (El Sargento Kirk, El Eternauta, Mort Cinder)
- Ariel Olivetti - (Daredevil, X-Man)
- Lino Palacio - (Ramona, Don Fulgencio)
- Quino - (Mafalda)
- Dante Quinterno - (Patoruzú)
- Eduardo Risso - (100 Bullets)
- Carlos Sampayo - (Alack Sinner)
- Juan Sasturain
- Ernesto García Seijas - (El Negro Blanco)
- Fernando Sendra - (Yo, Matías)
- Hector Torino - (Don Nicola, Pascualín, Barrabás, Pepinucho, Coliflor, Mudini), died at age 78.
- Carlos Trillo - (El Loco Chavez, El Negro Blanco, Cybersix, Spaghetti Brothers)
- Juan Zanotto - (Yor, Bárbara)

== Austria ==
- Manfred Deix - (satirical comics)
- Fritz Gareis - (Bilderbogen des kleinen Lebens)
- Ladislaus Kmoch - (Tobias Seicherl)
- Thomas Kriebaum - (Gustl, Neues aus der Praxis)
- Ulli Lust - (Today Is The Last Day of the Rest Of Your Life)
- Nicolas Mahler - (Flaschko, Kratochvil)
- Günther Mayrhofer - (Gallenstein)
- Erwin Moser
- Susanne Wenger

== Belgium ==
(bande dessinée, BD, strip (verhaal))

=== A–M ===
- Edouard Aidans - (Bob Binn, Tounga, Marc Franval)
- Frans Antonis - (assisted on Bessy)
- Dino Attanasio, Belgian of Italian descent - (Signor Spaghetti, Bob Morane, continued Modeste et Pompon)
- Jo-El Azara - (Taka Takata)
- Serge Baeken
- Guy Bara - (Max l'Explorateur)
- Batem - (continued Marsupilami)
- Bédu - (Le P'tit Prof, Les Psy)
- Arthur Berckmans, also known as "Berck" - (Sammy, Strapontin)
- Karel Biddeloo - (continued De Rode Ridder)
- Bom - (scripted Broussaille, Julie, Claire, Cécile)
- Tom Borremans - (Principiële Peter, Sociaal Incapabele Michiel)
- Jan Bosschaert - (Pest in 't Paleis, Sam, De Geverniste Vernepelingskes, Jaguar)
- Tom Bouden - (Flikkerzicht, Paniek in Stripland, continued De Lustige Kapoentjes)
- Karel Boumans - (assisted Suske en Wiske, Jommeke, continued De Lustige Kapoentjes)
- Nic Broca - (The Snorks, continued Spirou et Fantasio)
- Jeff Broeckx - (Waterland, Dag en Heidi, continued Bessy)
- Jean-Marie Brouyère - (scripted Archie Cash, L'Épervier Bleu)
- Jan Bucquoy - (several erotic parodies)
- Buth - (Thomas Pips, Vader Kapoen Vertelt)
- Randall Caesar
- Charel Cambré - (celebrity comics, Albert & Co, Jump, Amoras, continued Suske en Wiske, rebooted Spirou et Fantasio)
- Roger Camille, also known as Kiko - (Foufi)
- Eva Cardon, aka Ephameron - (Us Two, Together)
- Francis Carin - (Victor Sackville)
- Raoul Cauvin - (scripted Les Tuniques Bleues, Les Femmes en Blanc, Pierre Tombal, Agent 212, Cédric, Cupidon, Natacha, Pauvre Lampil, Les Psy)
- Thierry Cayman - (Sylvain de Rochefort, S.T.A.R., worked on Jhen)
- Jean-Michel Charlier - (co-creator of Buck Danny, Barbe-Rouge and Blueberry)
- Fernand Cheneval - (born in Switzerland, later moved to Belgium) (founder of Heroïc Albums)
- May Claerhout (made comics for the magazine Ohee, notable for being the first Flemish female comics artist)
- Rik Clément - (Dees Dubbel, Jan Knap, Ridder Reinhart)
- Antoinette Collin - (Les Naufragés de l'Escalator, Christobald)
- Didier Comès - (L'Ombre du Corbeau)
- Conz - (Toen Ik Nog Baas Van De Wereld Was, De Tweede Kus)
- François Craenhals - (Pom et Teddy, Rémy et Ghislaine, Le Chevalier Ardent)
- Cram - (De Weyfelaers, Jan Pech)
- Crisse (Didier Chrispeels) - (L' Épée de Cristal, Kookaburra, Petit d'homme, Luuna)
- Luc Cromheecke - (Roboboy, Plunk)
- Nine Culliford - (colorist of The Smurfs)
- Thierry Culliford - (scripted Germain et nous..., continued The Smurfs)
- Paul Cuvelier - (Corentin, Epoxy)
- Dany (Daniel Henrotin) - (Olivier Rameau, Histoire Sans Héros, Red Ears)
- Jeroen De Coninck - (continued The Smurfs)
- Lucien De Gieter - (Papyrus)
- Bob de Groot - (Léonard, Robin Dubois)
- Danny De Haes - (Harry Humus)
- Luk De Maeyer - (Lotje)
- Bob de Moor - (Cori, de Scheepsjongen, Barelli, Johan en Stefan, Monsieur Tric, Nonkel Zigomar, Snoe en Snolleke)
- Johan De Moor - (La Vache, Gaspard de la Nuit, continued Quick et Flupke)
- Pieter De Poortere - (Boerke, aka Dickie)
- Bruno De Roover - (assisted on Suske en Wiske)
- Eduard De Rop - (De Geschiedenis van Sleenovia, assisted on Suske en Wiske, Jerom)
- Eric De Rop - (Schanulleke, Bloemlezing, assisted on Suske en Wiske)
- Shamisa Debroey - (Verdwaald)
- Charles Degotte - (Flagada, Les Motards)
- Paul Deliège - (Bobo)
- Yvan Delporte - (scriptwriter for various comics in Spirou)
- Renaat Demoen - (several realistic comics for the magazine Zonneland)
- Christian Denayer - (Alain Chevallier, Wayne Shelton, Les Casseurs (later retitled Al et Brock))
- Filip Denis - (Tintin in Switzerland)
- Vincent Deporter - (a.k.a. Vince Deporter, Mike Deporter) - (Roméo, comics adaptations of SpongeBob SquarePants)
- Baudouin De Duve - (Tintin in Thailand)
- Steven De Rie - (assisted on Urbanus)
- Stephen Desberg - (Billy the Cat)
- Jacques Devos - (Génial Olivier)
- Didgé - (Monsieur Édouard, continued Red Ears)
- Fernand Dineur - (Tif et Tondu)
- Bruno Di Sano - (continued Red Ears)
- Draner
- Erwin Drèze - (Les Aventures de Louis Valmont)
- Frédéric duBus - (political satire comics)
- André-Paul Duchâteau - (scripted Ric Hochet)
- Kim Duchateau - (Esther Verkest)
- Jean Dufaux - (Jessica Blandy)
- Blanche Dumoulin (made comics for Spirou and was the wife of Rob-Vel).
- Dupa - (Cubitus)
- Steven Dupré - (Sarah en Robin)
- Yves Duval - (scriptwriter for Tintin)
- Marianne Duvivier
- Serge Ernst - (Clins d'Oeil, William Lapoire, Zapping Generation)
- Evany - (assisted Hergé)
- Brecht Evens
- Leo Fabri - (Marjolein)
- Ferry - (Ian Kalendine)
- René Follet - (Les Zingari, Yvan Zourine, Steve Severin, Terreur)
- Gérald Forton - (Kim Devil, He-Man newspaper comic, continued Bob Morane)
- Francis - (Marc Lebut et son Voisin)
- Philippe Francq - (Largo Winch)
- Frank, aka Frank Pé - (Broussaille, Zoo)
- André Franquin - (Gaston, Modeste et Pompon, Marsupilami, Idées Noires, continued Spirou et Fantasio)
- Franz (Franz Drapper) - (Jugurtha)
- Patryck de Froidmont - (Dingument Vôtre)
- Fred and Liliane Funcken (Le Chevalier Blanc, realistic historical comics for the magazine Tintin)
- Edgar Gastmans - (Willeke, assisted on Jommeke and Zilverpijl)
- Bruno Gazzotti - (continued Soda, assisted on Le Petit Spirou, co-created Seuls)
- André Geerts - (Jojo)
- Paul Geerts - (continued Suske en Wiske)
- Jonas Geirnaert - (Kabouter Wesley)
- Philippe Geluck - (Le Chat)
- Serge Gennaux - (L'Homme aux Phylactères, Les Télé-Graphistes, Les Émissions Impossibles)
- Géri - (Mr. Magellan, Skblllz)
- Benoît Gillain - (Bonux Boy)
- Henri Gillain - (scriptwriter for Spirou)
- François Gilson - (Mélusine)
- Glem - (Les Voraces)
- Dominique Goblet - (Faire semblant c'est mentir)
- Godi - (L'Élève Ducobu)
- Eugeen Goossens - (assisted on Jerom, Suske en Wiske and Robert en Bertrand)
- Ray Goossens - (Reynaert de Vos, Tijl Uilenspiegel (sometimes called Tijl en Lamme), Ouwe Taaie, Mr. Snor, Snops, Tsjoem)
- Gos (Roland Goossens) - (La Scrameustache)
- Got (Gommaar Timmermans) - (Fideel de Fluwelen Ridder, Jonas en de Wonderwinkel, De Nieuwe Ark, Weber)
- Jean Graton - (Michel Vaillant)
- Greg (Michel Regnier) - (Achille Talon, scripted Bernard Prince, Comanche, Luc Orient and Bruno Brazil)
- Hachel - (Benjamin)
- Marc Hardy - (Pierre Tombal, Lolo et Sucette)
- René Hausman - (Saki et Zunie)
- Antoon Heckenrath - (De Wonderlijke Reis van Jan Knap, Urasjima de Vissersjongen, In De Greep van de Octopus)
- Marc Henniquiau - (assisted on The Adventures of Alix)
- Herbert, Belgian comics artist (Docteur Gladstone, worked on L'oncle Paul).
- Hergé - (The Adventures of Tintin, Quick and Flupke, Jo, Zette et Jocko)
- François-Joseph Herman - (assisted on Suske en Wiske)
- Hermann - (Bernard Prince, Comanche, Jeremiah)
- Cédric Hervan - (worked on The Adventures of Alix)
- Serge Honorez - (scripted ...Germain et Nous...)
- Jeanne and Laure Hovine (Nic et Nac), notable for being the first Belgian female comics artists.
- Victor Hubinon - (Buck Danny)
- Hugoké - (Belgman)
- Daniel Hulet - (Pharaoh)
- Hurey - (Jan Heibel, continued De Lustige Kapoentjes)
- Ilah - (Cordelia)
- Edgar P. Jacobs - (Le Rayon U, Blake and Mortimer)
- Paul Jamin, also known as Alidor and Alfred Gérard - (Ernest Lecrac)
- Frédéric Jannin - (...Germain et nous...)
- Janry, (Jean-Richard Geurts) - (continued Spirou et Fantasio, co-created Le Petit Spirou)
- Jeroen Janssen - (Muzungu, Sluipend Gif in Rwanda, Bakamé, Doel)
- Mark Janssen - (Drab Drabbers)
- Jean-Pol - (Kramikske, Annie en Peter, assisted and continued Sammy)
- Jem - (Les Malheurs de Charlie)
- Jeroom - (Tettenman, Reetman, Joske het debiele ei, Het Knuffelbos)
- Jidéhem - (Sophie)
- Jijé - (Blondin et Cirage, Spirou et Fantasio, Jerry Spring)
- Kamagurka - (Bert, scriptwriter of Cowboy Henk)
- Peter Koeken - (assisted on Robert en Bertrand, Jerom and De Kiekeboes)
- Octave Joly - (scripted Les Belles Histories de L'Oncle Paul)
- Daniel Kox - (Agent 212)
- Jean-Marc Krings - (Les Informaticiens, Fanny K.)
- Lambil - (Pauvre Lambil, continued Les Tuniques Bleues)
- Laudec (born in Italy, lives in Belgium) - (Cédric)
- Jacques Laudy - (David Balfour)
- Walter Laureysens - (assisted on Bessy)
- Lectrr - (Lars)
- Marc Legendre - (Biebel, script writer of Sam and Amoras)
- Pascal Lefèvre - (Berlin, scripted O Dierbaar Vlaanderen...)
- Hec Leemans - (Brian Howell, Bakelandt, Circus Maximus, F.C. De Kampioenen)
- Roger Leloup - (Yoko Tsuno)
- Hugo Leyers, aka Hug - (Met de Neus en Co op Stap)
- Philippe Liégeois (Turk) - (Léonard, Robin Dubois)
- Leo Loedts - (De Familie Nopjes)
- Willy Linthout - (Urbanus, Years of the Elephant)
- Joseph Loeckx (Jo-El Azara) - (Taka Takata)
- Raymond Macherot - (Clifton, Chlorophylle, Sibylline)
- Malik - (Archie Cash, Cupidon)
- Maurice Maréchal - (Prudence Petitpas)
- Marvano (Mark van Oppen) - (Forever War)
- Hugo Matthysen - (Boerke Kevin)
- Bob Mau - (Kari Lente)
- Merho - (De Kiekeboes)
- Ever Meulen - (Piet Peuk, Balthasar de Groene Steenvreter)
- Erik Meynen - (Van Rossem, comics about Belgian politicians)
- Midam - (Kid Paddle)
- Mitacq (Michel Tacq) (La Patrouille des Castors)
- Mister Kit - (many comics about aviation)
- Mittéï - (Bonaventure, continued Modeste et Pompon)
- Luk Moerman, aka Baixinho - (De Papevreters - De Popebusters)
- Luc Morjaeu - (Biep en Zwiep, continued Suske en Wiske)
- Morris (Maurice de Bevere) - (Lucky Luke)
- Mythic - (Rubine)

=== N–Z ===
- Nix - (Kinky & Cosy)
- Nonkel Fons - (wrote comics for Catholic children's magazines like Zonneland, Zonnestraal, Zonnekind and Doremi)
- Jef Nys - (Jommeke, Met Langteen en Schommelbuik Voorwaarts)
- Eddy Paape - (Luc Orient, Marc Dacier)
- Olivier Pâques - (assisted on Loïs)
- Frank Pé - (Broussaile)
- Guy Peellaert - (Les Aventures de Jodelle, Pravda)
- Benoît Peeters - (Les Cités Obscures)
- Peyo (Pierre Culliford) - (Smurfs, Johan and Peewit, Poussy, Benoit Brisefer)
- Picha - (comic book adaptations of his animated features)
- Pil - (Meneerke Peeters)
- Pink (Eugeen Hermans) - (Suske en Blackske, Flipke en de Rakkers)
- Pirana - (Mevrouw Dallemans)
- Arthur Piroton - (Jess Long)
- Jean Pleyers - (Giovani, co-creator of Jhen and Khéos)
- Ploeg - (Prosper)
- Sylvain Polfliet - (Brian Howell)
- Pom - (Piet Pienter en Bert Bibber)
- Ptiluc - (Pacush Blues, Rats)
- Punt - (De Perfesser)
- Peter Quirijnen - (assisted on Suske en Wiske)
- Erika Raven - (Ripley, Erika)
- Renaud (Renaud Denauw) - (Jessica Blandy)
- Roba - (Boule et Bill, La Ribambelle)
- Félicien Rops - (M. Coremans Au Tir National)
- Rosy - (Tif et Tondu, Bobo)
- Eddy Ryssack - (Brammetje Bram, Opa)
- Louis Salvérius - (Les Tuniques Bleues)
- Jacques Sandron - (Godaille et Godasse)
- Bart Schoofs - (God en Klein Pierken, scripted Kinky & Cosy)
- Olivier Schrauwen
- François Schuiten - (Les Cités Obscures)
- Christophe Simon - (continued Lefranc and The Adventures of Alix)
- Herr Seele - (Cowboy Henk)
- Frank Sels - (Zilverpijl, assisted on De Rode Ridder and Bessy)
- Yves Sente - (Blake and Mortimer, Thorgal)
- Pierre Seron - (Les Petits Hommes)
- Raoul Servais - (Pol en Piet)
- Sidney (Paul Ramboux) - (Julie, Claire, Cécile)
- Sirius - (L'Épervier Bleu, Les Timour)
- Marc Sleen - (The Adventures of Nero, Piet Fluwijn en Bolleke, De Lustige Kapoentjes, Doris Dobbel, Oktaaf Keunink, De Ronde van Frankrijk)
- Benoît Sokal - (Inspector Canardo)
- Simon Spruyt - (De Bamburgers)
- Dirk Stallaert - (Nino, Plankgas en Plastronneke, Mieleke Melleke Mol, Pakkeman en Poulet, assisted on The Adventures of Nero, De Kiekeboes, Suske en Wiske)
- Jean-Philippe Stassen - (Le Bar du Vieux Français)
- Stedho - (Red Ryder)
- René Sterne - (Adler)
- Caryl Strzelecki
- Stuf - (Passe-moi l'Ciel)
- Wim Swerts - (various celebrity comics)
- Yves Swolfs - (Durango)
- André Taymans - (Caroline Baldwin)
- Piet Tibos - (De Avonturen van Sebedeus en zijn Ploeg)
- Maurice Tillieux - (Gil Jourdan)
- Tonet Timmermans
- Tome (Philippe Vandevelde) - (continued Spirou et Fantasio, co-created Le Petit Spirou, creator of Soda)
- Touïs - (Le Sergent Laterreur)
- Urbanus - (script writer for Urbanus, Mieleke Melleke Mol, Plankgas en Plastronneke, De Geverniste Vernepelingskes)
- Steve Van Bael - (Iris, various celebrity comics)
- Fritz Van den Heuvel - (Bob De Kerpel, scripted De Bamburgers)
- Walter Van Gasse - (assisted on Suske en Wiske)
- Jean Van Hamme - (Histoire Sans Héros, Thorgal, XIII, Largo Winch)
- Thierry Van Hasselt
- Patrick Van Lierde - (assisted on Bessy and Jommeke)
- Jacques Van Melkebeke - (Les Nouvelles Aventures du Baron de Crac)
- George Van Raemdonck - (Bulletje en Boonestaak)
- Ron van Riet - (Zwik en Zwak, continued Robert en Bertrand, assisted on Bessy)
- Katrien Van Schuylenbergh (Oh Dierbaar Vlaanderen..., Merel)
- William Vance - (XIII, Bob Morane, Bruno Brazil)
- Maarten Vande Wiele - (I Love/Hate Paris, Abba Zoekt Frida)
- Erik Vandemeulebroucke - (assisted Willy Vandersteen, Karel Verschuere and Rolf Kauka)
- Willy Vandersteen - (Suske en Wiske, De Rode Ridder, Bessy, De Familie Snoek, Robert en Bertrand, De Geuzen)
- Judith Vanistendael - (Dance By The Light of The Moon)
- Marc Verhaegen - (Senne en Sanne, continued Suske en Wiske)
- Dan Verlinden, aka Dan (assisted on Le Petit Spirou, continued Soda)
- Karel Verschuere - (Zilverpijl, assisted on De Rode Ridder, Bessy)
- François Walthéry - (Natacha, Le Vieux Bleu)
- Luc Warnant - (Soda)
- Marc Wasterlain - (Docteur Poche, Jeannette Pointu)
- Jan Waterschoot - (Johnny De Weesjongen)
- Albert Weinberg - (Dan Cooper)
- Michel Weyland - (Aria)
- Will (Willy Maltaite) - (continued Tif et Tondu)
- Yslaire (Bernard Hislaire) - (Bidouille et Violette, Sambre)
- Zak - (made a few political comics in the 1980s before becoming a one-panel cartoonist)
- Zidrou - (scripted L'Élève Ducobu, Tamara, Margot et Oscar Pluche)

== Brazil ==
- Angelo Agostini - (As Aventuras de Nhô Quim)
- Rafael Albuquerque - (Tune 8, worked on Blue Beetle)
- Walmir Amaral - (Disney comics, continued Aventuras do Anjo, worked on O Vingador, Zhor, O Atlanta, Zorro, Alex e Cris, The Phantom and Mandrake the Magician)
- Angeli - (Chiclete com Banana)
- Érica Awano - (worked on Holy Avenger)
- Daniel Azulay - (Capitão Sol, Capitão Cipó, comics based on his own TV show Turma do Lambe-Lambe)
- Gabriel Bá - (The Umbrella Academy, Casanova, Daytripper)
- Ely Barbosa - (Turma da Fofura, Turma do Cacá)
- Eddy Barrows - (worked for DC Comics)
- Julia Bax - (Princesse Caraboo)
- Ed Benes - (worked for DC Comics)
- Joe Bennett - (worked for DC Comics and Marvel Comics)
- Danilo Beyruth - (Necronauta, Astronauta – Magnetar)
- Glauco Villas Boas - (Geraldão)
- Gustavo Borges - (A Entediante Vida de Morte Crens, Edgar, Pétalas, Escolhas)
- Renato Canini - (Dr. Fraud, Kactus Kid, Tibica, Zé Candango, Disney comics)
- Sergio Cariello - (worked for Marvel Comics, DC Comics)
- J. Carlos - (Lamparina, Juquinha, Almofadinha & Melindrosa)
- Paulo Caruso - (Avenida Brasil)
- Marcelo Cassaro - (Holy Avenger)
- Mario Cau - (Terapia)
- Fabio Coala - (O Monstro, Perfeição)
- Flavio Colin - (comics based on Brazilian folklore, horror comics)
- Eugenio Colonnese - (Mirza, A Mulher-Vampira, O Morto do Pântano)
- Jayme Cortez - (Os 2 Amigos)
- Jefferson Costa - (Kiss Me, Judas, La Dansarina)
- Roger Cruz - (worked for Marvel Comics)
- Marcelo D'Salete - (Noite Luz, Encruzilhada, Cumbe, Angola Janga)
- Getulio Delphim - (drew celebrity comics based on TV series)
- Mike Deodato - (worked for DC Comics, Marvel Comics)
- André Diniz - (Subversivos, Fawcett, Morro de Favela, Olimpo Tropical)
- Gustavo Duarte - (Có!, Taxi, Monstros!, Birds, worked for Marvel Comics and DC Comics)
- Laudo Ferreira Jr. - (graphic novels based on Coffin Joe films, Olimpo Tropical, Yeshuah)
- Paulo Fukue - (Pabeyma, Tarun, Super Heros, worked on Senninha)
- Roberto Fukue - (Disney comics, worked on Senninha)
- Raquel Gompy - (Nérd e Sua Turma, Pluma, A Gata)
- Fernando Gonsales - (Níquel Náusea)
- Rafael Grampá - (Mesmo Delivery, worked for DC Comics)
- Jack Herbert - (worked for DC Comics)
- Waldyr Igayara de Souza - (Dugan Duck)
- Fernando Ikoma - (Fikom)
- Adão Iturrusgarai - (Los 3 Amigos, Aline, Rocky & Hudson)
- Laerte - (Piratas do Tietê)
- Ana Luiza Koehler - (Awrah)
- Léo (Trent, Kenya, Worlds of Aldebaran, Betelgeuse, Antares)
- Sérgio Lima - (Disney comics)
- Ju Loyola - (contributed to Combo Rangers)
- Henrique Magalhães - (Maria)
- Gedeone Malagola - (Ralo Negro, Hydroman, Homem Lua)
- Primaggio Mantovi - (Sacarrolha, Dr. Zôo, O Veterinário)
- Felipe Marcantonio - (XDragoon)
- Messias de Mello - (newspaper comics based on literary classics)
- Fábio Moon - (Casanova)
- Álvaro de Moya - (Disney comics)
- João Batista Queiroz - (Zuzuca)
- Ota - (Relatório Ota, A Garota Bipolar, scripted horror comics for Spektro)
- Péricles - (O Amingo da Onça)
- Bianca Pinheiro - (Bear, Meu Pai é Um Homem da Montanha, Alho-Poró, Mônica - Força)
- Ivan Reis - (worked for Marvel Comics, DC Comics)
- Marcello Quintanilha - (Fealdade de Fabi ano Gorila)
- Al Rio - (worked for Marvel Comics, DC Comics)
- Franco de Rosa - (Chucrutz, Capitão Caatinga)
- Luke Ross - (worked for Marvel Comics)
- Luiz Sá - (Reco-Reco, Bolão e Azeitona)
- Ivan Saidenberg - (Disney comics)
- Cláudio Seto - (Maria Erótica, O Samurai)
- Julio Shimamoto - (Capitão 7, Musashi I, Musashi II)
- Renato Silva - (A Garra Cinzenta)
- Flavio Soares - (A Vida com Logan, As Aventuras do MorsaMan, Meninos e Dragões, A Lei de Murphy)
- Mauricio de Sousa - (Turma da Mônica (Monica and Friends, Turma do Chico Bento (Chuck Billy 'n' Folks), Turma da Tina (Tina's Pals), Turma do Penadinho (Bug-a-Booo), Turma da Mata (Lionel's Kingdom), Piteco (The Cavern Clan, Horacio's World, Papa Capim (Monica, O Astronauta (Bubbly the Astronaut)
- Marcio Takara - (worked for Marvel Comics, Disney comics)
- André Vazzios - (Uiara e os Filhos do Eco)
- Germana Viana - (Lizzie Bordello e as Piratas do Espaço, As Empoderadas)
- Omar Viñole - (Coelho Nero)
- Alain Voss - (Anarcity, Zensetos)
- Fábio Yabu - (Combo Rangers)
- Carlos Zéfiro - (drew erotic comics)
- Ziraldo - (O Menino Maluquinho, Turma do Pererê)

== Bolivia ==
- Gaspar (Oscar Barbery Suarez) - (El Duende y su Camarilla)

== Chile ==
- Máximo Carvajal - (Dr. Mortis, Black Sloane)
- Alejandro Jodorowsky - (Anibal 5, Fabulas pánicas, Los insoportables Brobolla, The Incal, The Technopriests, Metabarons)
- Leo - (Macabeo, Teodoro)
- Themo Lobos - (Mampato, Cucalón)
- Pepo (Condorito)
- Gabriel Rodriguez - (Locke & Key)
- Edmundo Searle
- Vicar - (Locutín, Hipólito y Camilo, Quevedo, Paquita, Huaso Ramón)

== China ==
- Benjamin Zhang Bin (Seven Swords, Sky Doll)
- Chao Yat
- Li Chi-Tak (Black Mask)
- Lee Chi Ching (Sun Zi's Tactics, Records of the Three Kingdoms)
- Daxiong
- Fung Chin Pang (Confidential Assassination Troop)
- Feng Zikai (Zikai Manhua, Hu Sheng Hua Ji)
- Khoo Fuk-lung (Saint)
- Steve Gan (Star-Lord, Skull the Slayer)
- Huang Yao (Niubizi)
- Lau Wan-kit (Feel 100%)
- Nicky Lee (Youth Gone Wild, The One)
- Alice Meichi Li
- Yishan Li
- Alice Mak (McMug, McDull)
- Chan Mou (Unhuman, The Ravages of Time)
- Jenny Pat
- Andy Seto (Cyber Weapon Z)
- Te Wei (The Proud General)
- Tsai Chih Chung (The Drunken Swordsman)
- Ma Wing-shing (Fung Wan, Chinese Hero)
- Alfonso Wong (Old Master Q)
- Wong Yuk-long (Oriental Heroes, Weapons of the Gods)
- Ye Qianyu (Mr. Wang)
- Zhang Leping (Sanmao)
- Zhang Xiaobai (Si loin et si proche)

== Colombia ==
- Oscar Sierra Quintero, aka Oki

== Costa Rica ==
- Félix Arburola Bustos (continued Tricolín)
- Franco Céspedes (worked on Star Mage)
- Carlos Enrique Figueroa (Tricolín)
- Fernando Zeledón Guzmán – (La Semana en Serio)
- Hugo Díaz Jiménez – (Las Fisgonas de Paso Ancho)
- Dan Mora
- Francisco Munguía – (Pantys)
- Iván & Andrés Ramírez Ortiz – (founders of the comics magazines Revista Fotocopia and Ultracomics, creators of Buscongo, Jairo el Soñador, Mente y Máquina)
- Rodicab – (Desafíos, Leyendas de u Sabanero)
- Juan Díaz Rodriguez – (Glupy)
- Carlos Alvarado Salazar – (Carlos Pincel)
- John Timms – (worked on Harley Quinn)
- Noé Solano Vargas – (Candelario)

== Côte d'Ivoire ==
- Gilbert G. Groud

== Croatia ==
- Edvin Biukovic
- Tom Bunk - (Mad Magazine)
- Darko Macan
- Dubravko Mataković
- Andrija Maurovic
- Walter Neugebauer
- Stjepan Sejic

== Denmark ==
(tegneserie, plural form: tegneserier)

- Flemming Andersen (Disney comics)
- Sussi Bech (Nofret, Aida Nur, Eks Libris, Ørsted)
- Frederik Bramming (Frederik, Chas, Motorskatten)
- Helge Hall Jensen (Hilarius Petersens Radiooplevelser Bulder og Bum + Minus, Storebroer og Lillebror, Kjukken i Fritiden, Hans og Grete, Nullerten)
- Carla Hansen and Vilhelm Hansen (Rasmus Klump)
- Rune T. Kidde (Blomstrende Spaghetti)
- Teddy Kristiansen (artist on Grendel projects)
- Frank Madsen (Eks Libris, Kurt Dunder, Jim Spaceborn)
- Peter Madsen (Valhalla)
- Henning Dahl Mikkelsen (Mik) (Ferd'nand)
- Freddy Milton
- Anders Morgenthaler (Wumo)
- Robert Storm Petersen (Peter og Ping)
- Peter Snejbjerg (Lords of Misrule, Starman)
- Jakob Martin Strid (Strid)
- Mikael Wulff (Wumo)

== El Salvador ==
- Edmundo Anchietta López

== Finland ==
(sarjakuvat)

- Läjä Äijälä
- Matti Hagelberg
- Ilkka Heilä - (B. Virtanen)
- Petri Hiltunen - (Lauly yön Lapsista, Väinämöisen Paluu)
- Tuuli Hypén - (Nanna)
- Jouko Innanen - (Into, Herra Kaaranen)
- Lars Jansson - (ghost artist/writer of the Moomins in later years)
- Tove Jansson - (Moomins)
- Pertti Jarla - (Fingerpori)
- Arja Kajermo - (Tuula)
- Sami Kivelä - (Abbott, Machine Gun Wizards, Undone by Blood, Realm War - Age of Darknes, created celebrity comic about the rock band Lordi)
- Tarmo Koivisto (Mämmilä, Pääkaupunki)
- Kari Korhonen - (Disney comics)
- Karoliina Korhonen - (Finnish Nightmares)
- Kati Kovács - (Vihreä rapsodia, Karuselli, Miestennielijäksi sirkukseen, Onnen lahjat)
- Mauri Kunnas
- Kivi Larmola
- Kaisa Leka - (I Am Not Those Feet, Your Name is Krishangi)
- Kari Leppänen (Achilles Wiggen, worked on The Phantom)
- Tommi Liimatta
- Rosa Liksom
- Samuli Lintula - (Dark Side of the Horse)
- Klaus Nordling (assisted on The Spirit)
- Kalervo Palsa
- Milla Paloniemi - (Kiroileva siili)
- Ville Ranta
- Minna Sundberg - (A Redtail's Dream, Stand Still, Stay Silent, Lovely People)
- Katja Tukiainen
- Juba Tuomola (Viivi ja Wagner)
- Juha Vuorma - (Kaapuveikko)
- Wallu - (Lämsänperäläiset, Punaniska)

== France ==
(bande dessinée, BD)

=== A–M ===
- Achdé - (CRS=Détresse, continued Lucky Luke)
- Peggy Adam - (Luchadoras)
- Philippe Adamov - (Les Eaux de Mortelune, L'Impératrice Rouge, La Malédiction de Zener, Dakota)
- Alexis - (Timoléon, Cinémastock, Superdupont, Al Crane, Le Transperceneige)
- Algésiras - (Wendigo, Candélabres)
- Amandine - (Mistinguette)
- Diego Aranega - (Focu)
- Claude Auclair - (Simon du Fleuve)
- Virginie Augustin (Monsieur Désire?)
- François Avril - (Soirs de Paris)
- Philippe Aymond - (Lady S.)
- Mathieu Bablet – (Shangri-La, Carbon & Silicon)
- Pénélope Bagieu - (My Quite Fascinating Life, Exquisite Corpse, Joséphine)
- Nicolas Barral - (Baker Street)
- Vincent Batignole - (Gloomcookie)
- Edmond Baudoin - (Le Premier Voyage, Couma Acò, Éloge de la Poussière)
- David B. - (L'Ascension du Haut Mal)
- François Bel - (Pat et Moune, Pompon Rouge)
- Ted Benoit - (continued Blake and Mortimer)
- Charles Berberian - (Monsieur Jean)
- Philippe Bercovici - (Les Femmes en Blanc, Le Boss, Eva en Adam)
- Bertall - (Défauts des Enfants)
- André Bertrand - (La Retour de la Colonne Durutti)
- Georges Bess - (Le Lama Blanc, Anibal Cinq, Juan Solo, Péma Ling)
- Faustin Betbeder - (made one-shot comics)
- Enki Bilal - (Nikopol Trilogy)
- Christian Binet - (Bidochon)
- Christophe Blain - (Dungeon, Isaac Le Pirate, Quai d'Orsay)
- Michel Blanc-Dumont - (Jonathan Cartland)
- Blexbolex - (L'Imagier des Gens, Saisons, Romance)
- Bruno Blum - (comics about famous rock artists)
- Frédéric Boilet - (Le Rayon Vert, Tôkyô Est Mon Jardin)
- François Boucq - (Les Leçons du Professeur Bourremou, Jérôme Moucherot, Face de Lune, Les Aventures de la Mort et de Lao-Tseu, Bouncer)
- Claire Bouilhac - (Francis Blaireau Farceur )
- Boulet - (Raghnarok, worked on Dungeon)
- François Bourgeon - (Les Passagers du Vent)
- Jean-François Bournazel - (Tintin vs. Batman)
- Émile Bravo - (Épatantes aventures de Jules)
- Claire Bretécher - (Cellulite, Les Frustrés, Agrippine)
- Philippe Briones - (made stories for Marvel Comics, DC Comics)
- Paul and Gaëtan Brizzi - (La Cavale du Dr Destouches)
- Roger Brunel - (drew pornographic parodies of famous comic series)
- Jean de Brunhoff - (Babar the elephant)
- Max Cabanes - (Colin Maillard)
- Cabu - (Le Grand Duduche, worked for Hara-Kiri, Charlie Hebdo)
- Edmond-François Calvo - (La Bête est Mort)
- Thierry Capezzone - (H.C. Andersen Junior)
- Caran d'Ache - (made prototypical comics)
- Caza - (L' Âge d'Ombre)
- Florence Cestac - (Harry Mickson, Les Déblok, Cestac Pour Les Grands)
- Jean Cézard - (Arthur le fantôme justicier)
- Christophe Chabouté - (Alone, The Park Bench)
- Yves Chaland - (The Adventures of Freddy Lombard)
- Gilles Chaillet - (Vasco, Les Aventures d'Idéfix, assisted on The Adventures of Alix)
- Charb - (Maurice et Patapon, worked for Charlie Hebdo)
- Chaval
- André Chéret - (Rahan)
- Églantine Chesneau - (12 301 Jours Avec Ma Mamie)
- Pierre Christin - (scripted Valérian et Laureline)
- Christopher (Christopher Longé) - (Contes Inachèves de David Watts, Les Filles)
- Nicole Claveloux - (Les Trèfles de Longue-Oreille)
- Serge Clerc - (Captain Futur, Phil Perfect, Sam Blanc)
- Émile Cohl - (various one-shot comics)
- Olivier Coipel - (House of M, Legion of Super-Heroes, Thor)
- Didier Conrad - (Jason, Les Innomables, continued Astérix)
- Didier Convard - (Chats)
- François Corteggiani - (Disney comics, scripted Pif le Chien, De Silence et de Sang, La Jeunesse de Blueberry)
- Patrick Cothias - (scripted Les Septs Vies de L'Épervier, Coline Maillard)
- Christophe, AKA Georges Colomb - (La Famille Fenouillard)
- Daphné Collignon - (Flora et les Étoiles Filantes)
- Colonel Moutarde - (Le Meilleur de Moi, Grenadine et Mentalo, La BD des Filles, Maïa)
- Didier Conrad - (Les Innommables, continued Astérix)
- François Corteggiani – (worked on Pif le chien, Young Blueberry)
- Étienne Davodeau - (Les Ignorants)
- Ludovic Debeurme - (Lucille)
- Nicolas de Crécy - (Foligatto, Léon la Came)
- Marc Cuadrado - (Parker & Badger)
- François Dermaut - (Les Chemins de Malefosse)
- Bernadette Després - (Tom-Tom and Nana)
- Isabelle Dethan - (Mémoire de Sable)
- Alain Dodier - (Gully, Jérôme K. Jérôme Bloche)
- Gustave Doré - (Les Travaux d'Hercule, Trois Artistes Incompris et Mécontents, The Rare and Extraordinary History of Holy Russia)
- Philippe Druillet - (Lone Sloane)
- Philippe Dupuy - (Monsieur Jean)
- Lucie Durbiano - (Les Super Super)
- Virgile Dureuil – (Dans les forêts de Sibérie)
- Marie Duval - (Ally Sloper)
- Édika - (Pom-Pom-Pidou-Waah, Bronsky Proko, Clarke Gaybeul)
- Yacine Elghorri - (Gunman, Bestial, Factory)
- Fabcaro - (Zaï Zaï Zaï Zaï)
- Nathalie Ferlut - (Ether Glister)
- Jean-Yves Ferri - (Le Retour à la Terre, continued Astérix)
- Floc'h - (Le Dossier Harding Une Trilogie Anglaise, Une Vie de Rêve)
- F'Murr (Richard Peyzaret) - (Le Génie des alpages)
- Jean-Claude Forest - (Barbarella)
- Jean-Claude Fournier - (continued Spirou et Fantasio)
- Stephan Franck
- Sylvain Frécon - (comics based on Oggy and the Cockroaches)
- François Marcela-Froideval - (scripted Black Moon Chronicles)
- Louis Forton - (Les Pieds Nickelés)
- Fred (Frédéric Aristidès) - (Philémon)
- Gébé - (L'An 01)
- Henri Gerbault - (made one-shot comics)
- Gervy - (Pat'Apouf)
- Jean-Pierre Gibrat - (Goudard, Mattéo)
- Paul Gillon - (Les naufragés du temps)
- Jean Giraud, also known as Gir and Moebius - (Blueberry, Arzach, L'Incal)
- Christian Godard - (Martin Milan, scripted The Vagabond of Limbo)
- Annie Goetzinger - (Félina, Aurore, La Demoiselle de la Légion d'honneur, Agence Hardy)
- René Goscinny - (scripted Astérix, Oumpah-pah, Le Petit Nicolas, Iznogoud)
- Yves Got - (Le Baron Noir)
- Marcel Gotlib - (Gai-Luron, Rubrique-à-Brac, Les Dingodossiers, Hamster Jovial, Superdupont)
- Jean Graton - (Michel Vaillant)
- Virginie Greiner - (Secrets)
- Stephanie Hans - (co-created Die)
- Éric Hérenguel - (Balade au bout du monde, Krän)
- Chéri Hérouard - (made one-shot comics)
- Loo Hui Phang - (Prestige de l'Uniforme)
- Richard Isanove - (penciller for The Dark Tower: The Gunslinger Born)
- Marie Jaffredo (Yuan: journal d'une adoption)
- Pierre Joubert - (published in children's comic magazines)
- Pascal Jousellin - (Imbattable)
- Gustave-Henri Jossot - (various one-shot comics)
- André Juillard - (Bohémond de Saint Gilles, Arno, Les Sept Vies de l'Epervier, Plume Aux Vents)
- Yves Ker Ambrun - (HB-Scott, Gaspard le Lézard, Flippo & Punkina, Schnecksnyder)
- Kerascoët - (Beauté, Miss Pas Touche)
- Patrice Killoffer - (continued Fantômette)
- Michel Koeniguer - (Bushido, Eightball Hunter, Bomb Road, Misty Mission)
- Claude Lacroix, A.K.A. Alias (Yann Le Migrateur, Fariboles Sidérales, scripted Cyann)
- Pierre Lacroix (continued Bibi Fricotin)
- Emmanuel Larcenet - (La Vie est Courte, Bill Baoud, Les Cosmonautes du Futur, Le Combat Ordinaire, The Road)
- Oriane Lassus - (Le Meilleurissime Repaire de la Terre, Quoi de plus normal qu'infliger la vie?)
- Gérard Lauzier - (Michel Choupon)
- Étienne Lécroart - (Oupus)
- Roger Lécureux - (scripted Les Pionniers de l'Espérance, Rahan)
- Olivier Ledroit - (Black Moon Chronicles)
- Jean Leguay - (Kebra, Keubla, Gazoline)
- Serge Lehman - (The Chimera Brigade)
- Emmanuel Lepage - (Névé, Muchacho, La Lune est Blanche, Un Printemps à Tchernobyl, Voyage aux Îles de la Désolation)
- Samantha Leriche-Gionet - (Boumeries)
- Maximilien Le Roy - (Nietzsche, se créer liberté, Thoreau: A Sublime Life)
- Georges Lévis (Jean Sidobre, Sylvia) - (Liz et Beth, Les Perles de l'Amour)
- Serge Lindier - (Alan)
- Jacques Lob - (Ténébrax, Superdupont, Submerman, scripted Snowpiercer)
- Jean-Marc Lofficier - ('Marvel Comics, DC Comics)
- Régis Loisel - (La Quête de l'oiseau du temps)
- Lortac - (various one-shot comics)
- Jacques de Loustal - (various one-shot comics)
- Bruno Madaule - (Les Zinzinventeurs, Eglantine et Diégo, Les Givres, Les Blagues Suisses, Helmout)
- Bruno Maïorana - (Garulfo)
- Makyo - (Jérôme K. Jérôme Bloche, La Balade au Bout du Monde)
- Pat Mallet - (Les Petits Hommes Vertes, Pegg le Robot, Xing & Xot, Zoum)
- Lisa Mandel (Nini Patalo)
- Nikita Mandryka - (Le Concombre Masqué)
- Richard Marazano - (Cuervos)
- Frank Margerin - (Lucien, Simone et Léon)
- Marijac - (Jules Barigoule, Jim Boum, Les Trois Mousquetaires du Maquis, scripted Colonel X)
- Jul Maroh - (Blue Is The Warmest Color)
- Jacques Martin - (The Adventures of Alix, Lefranc)
- Jean-Luc Masbou - (De Cape et de Crocs)
- Aude Massot - (Une Saison à l'ONU, Au Coeur de la Diplomatie Mondiale)
- Jean-Christophe Menu - (Meder, Plates-bandes)
- Metaphrog - (Louis)
- Jean-Claude Mézières - (Valérian et Laureline)
- Mezzo - (King of the Flies)
- Denise Millet - (Pic et Pik)
- Jean-François Miniac - (comics based on Agatha Christie)
- Marion Montaigne - (Tu Mourras Moins Bête)
- Chantal Montellier - (Andy Gang, Julie Bristol)
- Catel Muller - (Les Papooses, Top Linotte)

=== N–Z ===
- Fabrice Neaud - (Journal)
- Nicolas Nemiri - (Je Suis Morte, Hyper L'Hyppo)
- Aurélie Neyret - (Les Carnets de Cerise)
- Jacques Nicolaou - (continued Pif le Chien and Placid et Muzo)
- Norma - (Capitaine Apache, Hazel & Ogan)
- O'Galop - (made one-shot comics)
- Vincent Paronnaud - (mostly one-shot comics)
- Cyril Pedrosa - (Ring Circus, Shaolin Moussaka, Trois Ombres)
- Benoît Peeters - (Les Cités Obscures)
- René Pellos - (Futuropolis, Durga Rani, continued Les Pieds Nickelés)
- Nancy Peña - (Le Chat du Kimono, Médée, Madame)
- Jean-Claude Pertuzé - (Les Chants de Pyrène)
- Jean-Louis Pesch - (Bec-en-Fer, continued Les Pieds Nickelés and Sylvain et Sylvette)
- René Pétillon - (Jack Palmer, Le Baron Noir)
- Georges Pichard - (Ténébrax, Paulette, Submerman, Blanche Epiphanie)
- Émile-Joseph Pinchon - (Bécassine)
- Raymond Poïvet - (Les Pionniers de l'Espérance)
- Jean-Michel Ponzio - (Genetiks, The Chimpanzee Complex)
- Pozla - (Monkey Bizness)
- Léo Quievreux - (Immersion trilogy)
- Benjamin Rabier - (Gideon the duck)
- Pascal Regnauld - (continued Inspector Canardo)
- Jean-Marc Reiser - (worked for Hara-Kiri, Charlie Hebdo)
- Paul Renaud - (Cavewoman)
- Benjamin Renner - (Le Grand Méchant Renard)
- Sandrine Revel - (Grand Silence)
- Antoine Revoy - (ANIMUS)
- David Revoy - (Pepper&Carrot)
- Anouk Ricard - (Anna et Froga, Comissaire Toumi, Galaxie Chérie)
- Rob-Vel, A.K.A. François Robert Velter - (Spirou)
- André Roche - (made advertising comics for Kinder Surprise)
- Jean-Marc Rochette - (Snowpiercer)
- Michel Rodrigue - (Doggyguard, continued Clifton and Comanche)
- Théa Rojzman - (La Réconciliation, Émilie Voit Quelqu'un)
- Rosalys - (Workaholic)
- Horst Rosenthal - (Mickey au Camp de Gurs)
- Stephane Roux - (worked for Marvel Comics, DC Comics and Semic Comics)
- Jacqueline Rivière - (scripted Bécassine)
- Alain Saint-Ogan - (Zig et Puce)
- Guy Sajer (Dimitri) - (scripted Jean Valhardi, drew Harald le Viking, Goutatou et Dorochaux, Le Goulag)
- Mathieu Sapin - (Akissi, Gérard)
- Riad Sattouf - (The Arab of the Future)
- Johanna Schipper (known as "Johanna") – (Nos âmes sauvages)
- Jean-Jacques Sempé - (Le Petit Nicolas)
- Joann Sfar - (Donjon, The Rabbi's Cat)
- Benoist Simmat - (scripted Robert Parker: Les Sept Pêchés Capiteux)
- Anne Simon (comics) - (Perséphone aux enfers)
- Audrey Spiry - (L'Expédition)
- Roxanne Starr - (letterer for various comics)
- Philippe Sternis - (Snark Saga, Mouche)
- Jean Tabary - (Iznogoud, Richard et Charlie, Grabadu et Gabaliouchtou, Totoche, Corinne et Jeannot, Valentin Le Vagabond)
- Nicolas Tabary - (continued Iznogoud)
- Jacques Tardi - (Adèle Blanc-Sec, It Was the War of the Trenches, Nestor Burma)
- Didier Tarquin - (Lanfeust of Troy)
- Jacques Terpant - (Sept Cavaliers, Les Royaumes de Borée)
- Jean Teulé - (Le Magasin des Suicides)
- Tibet - (Chick Bill, Ric Hochet)
- Béatrice Tillier - (Fée et tendres automates)
- Annette Tison - (co-creator of Barbapapa)
- Roland Topor - (worked for Hara-Kiri)
- Ed Tourriol - (Mixman, Urban Rivals)
- Lewis Trondheim - (La Mouche, Kaput & Zösky, The Spiffy Adventures of McConey)
- Albert Uderzo - (Astérix, Oumpah-pah, Tanguy et Laverdure)
- Vanyda - (L' Immeuble d'en Face (The Building Opposite)
- Laurent Verron - (Le Maltais, Odilon Verjus)
- Martin Veyron - (Bernard Lermite, L'Amour Propre)
- Bastien Vivès - (Pour l'empire, Polina)
- Alain Voss - (Heilman, Adrénaline, Anarcity, Zensetos)
- Chloé Wary - (Saison des roses)
- Claire Wendling - (Les Lumières de l'Amalou)
- Georges Wolinski - (worked for Hara-Kiri, Charlie Hebdo, scripted Paulette by Georges Pichard)
- Yann - (scripted Les Innomables, Lolo et Sucette, Sambre, Freddy Lombard, Marsupilami)
- Édith Zha - (Les Femmes et l'Amour Homosexuel, La Main Verte)
- Édouard François Zier - (continued Bécassine)

== Germany ==
(der Comic, plural form: die Comics)

- Andreas - (Rork)
- Mali Beinhorn - (co-creator of Mike, der Taschengeldexperte)
- Reinhard Beuthien - (Lilli)
- Brösel - (Werner)
- Werner Büsch - (co-creator of Mike, der Taschengeldexperte)
- Wilhelm Busch - (Max und Moritz)
- Gus Dirks - (born in Germany, later moved to the U.S.A) (Bugville)
- Rudolph Dirks - (born in Germany, later moved to the U.S.A.) (Katzenjammer Kids, later retitled The Captain and the Kids)
- Marko Djurdjević
- Lothar Dräger - (Abrafaxe)
- Lyonel Feininger (born in Germany, later moved to the U.S.A.) - (The Kin-der-Kids, Wee Willie Winkie's World)
- Anke Feuchtenberger
- Aisha Franz - (Alien)
- Wolfgang J. Fuchs - (scriptwriter of Berry der Plantagenbär and Quark)
- David Füleki - (Entoman, Delfinium Prints, 78 Tage auf der Straße des Hasses)
- Cornelia Geppert - (continued Abrafaxe)
- Anike Hage - (Gothic Sports)
- Hannes Hegen - (Mosaik)
- Heinrich Hoffmann - (Der Struwwelpeter)
- Jamiri - (Jan-Michael Richter)
- Dieter Kalenbach - (Turi und Tolk)
- Katz & Goldt - (Stephan Katz and Max Goldt)
- Rolf Kauka - (Fix and Foxi)
- Roland Kohlsaat - (Jimmy das Gummipferd, later retitled Julios Abenteuerliche Reisen)
- Ralf König - (Kondom des Grauens, Der Bewegte Man)
- Isabel Kreitz - (Die Sache mit Sorge/Stalin's Spy in Tokyo)
- Anke Kuhl - (Lehmriese lebt, Manno! Alles genau so in echt passiert)
- Levin Kurio (Horrorschocker, Captain Berlin, Zombieman, Koma Comix)
- Loriot - (Wahre Geschichten Erlogen von Loriot, Reinhold das Nashorn)
- Harry Messerschmidt - (Xunni, der Redaktionsgeist)
- Walter Moers - (Das kleine Arschloch, Der alte Sack, Adolf, die Nazisau, Captain Bluebear)
- Willy Moese - (Bogomil, Klaus und Choko)
- Otto Nückel - (Destiny)
- Erich Ohser (also known as "E.O. Plauen") - (Vater und Sohn)
- Martin Perscheid - (Perscheids Abgründe)
- Bernd Pfarr - (Sondermann)
- Chlodwig Poth - (Mein Progressiver Alltag)
- Peter Puck - (Rudi)
- Heinz Rammelt - (Der Insel der Ferianer, Chi-Chi)
- Andreas Rausch - (Zappaesk)
- Carl Reinhardt - (Meister Lapp und sein Lehrjunge Pips)
- Reinhold Reitberger - (Wally und die Comics, co-creator of Berry the Plantagen-Bär)
- Ernest Riebe (born in Germany, later moved to the U.S.A.) - (Mr. Block)
- Lona Rietschel - (co-creator of Die Abrafaxe)
- Manfred Schmidt - (Nick Knatterton)
- Bernd Schmucker - (Nettmann)
- Simon Schwartz -
- Matthias Schultheiss - (Bell's Theorem)
- Axel Schumacher - (High Speed)
- Harald Siepermann - (Alfred Jodocus Kwak)
- Jimmy Stepanoff
- Klaus Voormann - (Revolver 50. Birth of an Icon)
- Barbara Yelin - (But I Live)

== Greece ==
(το κόμικ/κόμικς, plural form: τα κόμικς)

- Arkas
- Chrysanthos Mentis Bostantzoglou
- Alecos Papadatos
- Dimitris Papaioannou

== Hungary ==
- Attila Dargay - (Kajla)
- Nándor Honti, aka Bit - (Nagyapó Mozgószínháza, Tréfás Természetrajz, Séta Álomországban)
- Pál Pusztai - (Jucika)
- Lívia Rusz - (Mac, Cocofifi)
- Zoltan Varga - (Batmanus, Dállász)

== Iceland ==
- Pétur Bjarnason (Drottning Drusilla, later Regina)
- Helgi Thorgils Fridjónsson
- Bjarni Hinriksson - (Krassandi Samvera)
- Ingi Jensson

== Iran ==
- Marjane Satrapi (Persepolis)

== Ireland ==
- Paddy Brennan - (General Jumbo)
- Peter Bruce - (The Druid, scripted De Goeroe)
- Bob Byrne - (Mr. Amperduke)
- Michael Carroll - (wrote stories for Judge Dredd and DeMarco, P.I.)
- Maeve Clancy
- Malachy Coney - (Third World War, Holy Cross, Major Power and Spunky, worked on The Darkness)
- Davy Francis - (Cowpat County, Greedy Gorb, Anger)
- William St. John Glenn - (Oscar, Dorothea)
- P. J. Holden - (worked on Rogue Trooper, Judge Dredd, The 86ers and Johnny Woo)
- Gerry Hunt - (In Dublin City, Streets of Dublin, Blood Upon the Rose)
- Debbie Jenkinson - (Remorse)
- Clíodhna Lyons
- John McCrea - (The Demon, Hitman worked on Judge Dredd)
- Tomm Moore - (An Sclábhaí, An Teachtaire, The Secret of Kells)
- Dermot Power - (worked on Judge Dredd, Digitek and Sláine)
- Barry Reynolds - (An Táin)
- Declan Shalvey - (Hero Killers, Injection, worked on Thunderbolts and Northlanders)
- Elizabeth Shaw - (Sonntagmorgen)
- Will Simpson - (Hellblazer)
- Will Sliney - (Celtic Warrior: The Legend of Cú Chulainn)
- William St. John Glenn
- Cian Tormey - (AlanScott: Green Lantern, Son of Superman, The Question)
- Terry Willers - (Tich,General Nitt and his Barmy Army, Georgie's Germs, worked on Tom Poes and De Goeroe)
- Jack Butler Yeats - (Chubb-Lock Holmes)

== India ==
- Enver Ahmed - (Chandu)
- Jayanto Banerjee - (Gardhab Das)
- Neelabh Banerjee - (Gardhab Das, Dubyaman)
- Sarnath Banerjee - (Corridor)
- Yusuf Lien aka Yusuf Bangalorewala
- Baby - (Dinkan)
- Samit Basu
- Jitendra Bedi - (Bankelal)
- Chittaprosad Bhattacharya
- Rohan Chakravarty - (Green Humour)
- Nikhil Chaudhary (environmentalist)
- Tushar Chatterjee - ( Sokher Goyenda Nishith Roy )
- Mayukh Chowdhury - (Sankhar Naam Char , Agantuk ,Khape Dhaka Tarbari )
- Sean D'mello - (Mapui)
- Narayan Debnath - (Handa Bhonda, Bantul the Great, Nonte Phonte, Bahadur Beral )
- Dilip Das - ('Chuno Puti, Khude Baigganik Yuge Yuge )
- Bimal Das - Sadashib
- Luis Fernandes - (Kalia the Crow)
- B. M. Gafoor - (Kunjamman, Tintumon)
- Arjun Gaind
- Ashraf Ghori
- Kaveri Gopalakrishnan - (Thuppariyum Sambu)
- Gopulu
- Aditi Gupta - (Menstrupedia Comic)
- Manoj Gupta - (Bhokal)
- Sanjay Gupta - (Bhokal)
- Vasant Halbe - (Shikari Shambu)
- Jeyaraj
- Papindar Juneja - (Bankelal)
- Dilip Kadam - (Mahabharata)
- Jeevan Kang - (Spider-Man: India, The Sadhu, Seven Brothers)
- Naresh Kumar
- Sumit Kumar
- Tarun Kumar Wahi - (Doga, Paramanu, Bheriya)
- R. K. Laxman - (The Common Man, You Said It)
- Yusuf Lien - (worked on Amar Chitra Katha)
- Harvinder Mankkar - (Motu Patlu)
- P. K. Manthri
- George Mathen - (Halahala)
- N. M. Mohan - (scripted Mayavi, Soothran and Luttappi)
- Simi Muhamma - (continued Soothran)
- Pratap Mullick - (worked on Amar Chitra Katha)
- Bharath Murthy - (The Vanished Path)
- Madhavan Namboothiri (scripted Soothran)
- Vineet Nair - (Mapui)
- Ajit Ninan - (Detective Moochwala)
- Manjula Padmanabhan - (Doubletalk)
- Anant Pai - (Amar Chitra Katha)
- S. D. Phadnis
- Gaman Palem
- Amruta Patil - (Kari, Adi Parva: Churning of the Ocean, Sauptik: Blood and Flowers, Aranyaka: Book of the Forest)
- Tuhin Paul - (Menstrupedia Comic)
- Naren Ray
- Atanu Roy - (illustrated the joke pages in Target)
- Malik Sajad
- Malik Sajad - (Munnu - A Boy from Kashmir)
- Kaushik Saha - ( Tintin and the Art Mafia ) realistic Tintin comic as a tribute to Herge'
- Samuel (cartoonist) - (Babuji, Garib)
- Orijit Sen
- Deepak Sharma - (Odayan)
- Pran Kumar Sharma (Chacha Chaudhary, Pinki, Billoo)
- Sharad Sharma
- Prakash Shetty - (Kitoo)
- Abhisek Singh - (Ramayan 3392 A.D., India Authentic)
- Parismita Singh - (The Hotel at the End of the World)
- Anupam Sinha - (Super Commando Dhruva, Nagraj, Shakti)
- Abid Surti (Bahadur)
- Kruttika Susarla
- Shweta Taneja - (The Skull Rosary, Krishna: Defender of Dharma)
- Toms (cartoonist) - (Boban and Molly)
- Ram V (The Many Deaths of Laila Starr, Rare Flavours, Detective Comics)
- C. M. Vitankar - (worked on Amar Chitra Katha)
- Ram Waeerkar - (Suppandi, Pyarelal, Choru and Joru)

== Indonesia ==
- Dwi Koendoro - (Panji Koming, Legenda Sawung Kampret)
- Yohanes Surya - (Archi & Meidy)

== Israel ==
- Maya and Yehuda Devir
- Uri Fink
- Dudu Geva
- Rutu Modan

== Italy ==
(fumetto, plural form: fumetti)

- Giancarlo Alessandrini - (Allan Quatermain, Mister No, Rosco & Sonny, Martin Mystère, Ken Parker)
- Francesco Tullio Altan - (Pimpa, Ada)
- Sandro Angiolini - (Isabella, Vartan)
- Bruno Angoletta - (Marmittone, Sor Calogero Sorbara, Ermete Centarbe, Romolino & Romoletto)
- Dino Attanasio (born in Italy, spent most of his career in Belgium) - (Signor Spaghetti, Bob Morane)
- Vincenzo Baggioli - (Dick Fulmine)
- Renzo Barbieri - (Zora la Vampira)
- Dino Battaglia - (L'Ispettore Coke, Gargantua e Pantagruel)
- Massimo Belardinelli - (2000 AD, Ace Trucking Co., Sláine (comics))
- Giancarlo Berardi - (Ken Parker, Julia)
- Alessandro Bignamini
- Carlo Bisi - (Sor Pampurio)
- Paolo Bisi - (Larry Yuma)
- Gian Luigi Bonelli - (Tex Willer)
- Sergio Bonelli - (Zagor, Mister No)
- Bonvi - (Sturmtruppen, Nick Carter, Cattivik, Marzolino Tarantola)
- Carlo Boscarato - (Larry Yuma)
- Luciano Bottaro - (Pepito, Baldo, Whisky & Gogo, Pon Pon)
- Anna Brandoli - (La Strega)
- Max Bunker (Luciano Secchi) - (Kriminal, Satanik, Gesebel, Maxmagnus, Alan Ford, Milady 3000)
- Guido Buzzelli - (Zil Zelub)
- Antonio Canale - (Amok)
- Giovan Battista Carpi - (Paperinik, Geppo, Nonna Abelarda)
- Alfredo Castelli - (Gli Aristocratici, Martin Mystère, Zona X, Zio Boris)
- Claudio Castellini - (Dylan Dog)
- Giorgio Cavazzano - (Disney comics)
- Leone Cimpellin - (Jonny Logan, Maxmagnus, Plutos, Red Carson, Papero grosso e Fiorello, Gibernetta, Carletto Sprint, Tribunzio, Gigi Bizz, Gianni & Rob-8, Gelsomino, Tam Tam, Nero Fumo, Tom Patapom, Tchak)
- Guido Crepax - (Valentina)
- Gianni De Luca - (Commissario Spada)
- Fabrizio Dori (Gauguin: The Other World, Il dio vagabondo, Il figlio di Pan)
- Paolo Eleuteri Serpieri - (Druuna)
- EsseGesse - (Captain Miki,Il Grande Blek, Comandante Mark, Kinowa, Alan Mistero)
- Gallieno Ferri - (Zagor, Mister No)
- Leone Frollo - (Biancaneve)
- Aurelio Galleppini - (Tex Willer)
- Gino Gavioli - (Vita Da Cani, Paco y Monolito, Sempronio, Il Lupo e l'Agnello, Orlando lo Strambo)
- Vittorio Giardino - (Max Fridman, Little Ego)
- Alberto Giolitti
- Gipi (Gianni Pacinotti)
- Angela Giussani & Luciana Giussani - (Diabolik)
- Benito Jacovitti - (Cocco Bill, Zorry Kid)
- Lino Landolfi - (Procopio)
- Tanino Liberatore - (RanXerox)
- Enzo Magni - (Pantera Bionda)
- Magnus (Roberto Raviola) - Alan Ford, Kriminal, Satanik, Lo Sconosciuto, Necron)
- Milo Manara - (Giuseppe Bergman)
- Guido Martina - (L'Inferno di Topolino)
- Corrado Mastantuono - (Disney comics)
- Massimo Mattioli - (Pinky, Squeak the Mouse)
- Lorenzo Mattotti - (Fires)
- Michele Medda - (Nathan Never, Legs Weaver)
- Attilio Micheluzzi - (Petra Chérie)
- Ivo Milazzo - (Ken Parker)
- Graziano Origa
- Leo Ortolani - (Rat-man, Venerdì 12)
- Toni Pagot - (Calimero)
- Andrea Pazienza - (Massimo Zanardi)
- Carlo Peroni - (Gianconiglio, Zio Boris, Nerofumo, Paciocco, Ispettore Perogatt)
- Paolo Piffarerio - (Viva l'Italia, Maschera Nera, El Gringo, Alan Ford)
- Hugo Pratt - (Corto Maltese, Ernie Pike, Sergeant Kirk, Asso di Picche)
- Roberto Raviola - (Alan Ford, Kriminal, Satanik, Lo Sconosciuto, Necron)
- Giorgio Rebuffi - (Tiramolla, Trottolino, Pugacioff)
- Valentina Romeo - (Jonathan Steele, Nathan Never, Dylan Dog)
- Antonio Rubino - (Quadratino, Italino)
- Romano Scarpa - (Disney comics)
- Tiziano Sclavi - (Dylan Dog)
- Filippo Scòzzari
- Antonio Serra - (Nathan Never)
- Silver - (Lupo Alberto, continued Cattivik, Nick Carter)
- Guido Silvestri - (Lupo Alberto)
- Ferdinando Tacconi - (Gli Aristocratici, Dylan Dog, Nick Raider)
- Stefano Tamburini - (RanXerox)
- Antonio Terenghi - (Pedrito el Drito, Tarzanetto)
- Sergio Tofano - (Signor Bonaventura)
- Marcello Toninelli - (Zagor)
- Sergio Toppi - (Collezionista)
- Davide Toffolo - (Fandango)
- Sergio Zaniboni - (Diabolik)
- Juan Zanotto - (Henga, el cazador, Bárbara)

== Japan ==
(manga) see List of manga artists

== Kenya ==
see List of Kenyan editorial cartoonists

== Lebanon ==
see List of Lebanese editorialists

== Macedonia ==
See List of Macedonian comics creators

== Malaysia ==
- Billy Tan
- Lat - (The Kampung Boy)

== Malta ==
- Joe Sacco - (Palestine)

== Mexico ==
- Oscar Alvarado - (Penumbra)
- Sergio Aragonés - (born in Spain, later moved to Mexico) - (Groo the Wanderer, worked for Mad Magazine)
- Román Arámbula - (worked on Mickey Mouse)
- Santiago Cohen - (Angelitos)
- Oscar González Guerrero - (Zor y Los Invencibles, Hermelinda Linda)
- Modesto Vázquez González - (Kalimán)
- Leopoldo Jasso - (Cerdotado)
- José Ladrönn - (worked for Marvel Comics)
- Oscar González Loyo - (Karmatrón y los Transformables)
- Jorge Molina - (Spider-Geddon)
- Rafael Cutberto Navarro Huerta - (Kalimán)
- Daniel Pérez - (El Arsenal)
- Humberto Ramos - [worked for Marvel Comics)
- Rius - (Cuba for Beginners)
- Horacio Sandoval
- Jorge Tovar - (El Nieto del Ahuizotle, El Nahual)
- Sixto Valencia Burgos - (Memín Pinguín)
- Gabriel Vargas - (Los Superlocos, La Familia Burrón)
- Yolanda Vargas Dulché - (writer, Memín Pinguín, El Pecado de Oyuki)
- Andrew Zermeño - (Don Sotaco, Don Coyote, El Patroncito)

== Netherlands ==
(strip, stripverhaal, plural forms: strips, stripverhalen)

- Ben Abas - (Spot Morton, Lex Brand, Martin Evans)
- Henk Backer - (Yoebje en Achmed, Tripje en Liezebertha)
- Johnn Bakker - (Dan Blook, Dan Teal, De Keizerkraker)
- Raymond Bär van Hemmersweil - (Wipperoen)
- Merel Barends -
- Ton Beek - (Birre Beer)
- Jos Beekman - (Disney comics)
- René Bergmans - (SfinX)
- Teun Berserik - (Geheim Agent Pang)
- Eelke de Blouw and Tjarko Evenboer - (Evert Kwok)
- Theo van den Boogaard - (Ans en Hans Krijgen de Kans, Sjef van Oekel)
- Wilma van den Bosch - (Prinses Aster, Disney comics)
- Andries Brandt - (Holle Pinkel, Horre, Harm en Hella, Aafje Anders, Tina en Debbie, Roel Dijkstra)
- Dick Briel - (Professor Palmboom)
- Herman Brood - (Vaste Prik)
- Piet Broos (Jan Pierewiet, Brom, Ping en Ming, Slimpie, e.a., Ali Baba)
- Carry Brugman - (Joris Jofel, De Partners, Disney comics)
- Dik Bruynesteyn - (Appie Happie)
- Harry Buckinx - (Titul, Titula)
- David Bueno de Mesquita - (De Geschiedenis van Gulzigen Tobias, Billie Ritchie en Zijn Ezel)
- Bert Bus - (Olaf Noord, Theban, de eerste wereldreiziger, Cliff Rendall, Stef Ardoba, Malorix, Russ Bender, Archie the Robot)
- Remco Campert
- Aart Clerkx - (Jan Tit, Jan en Wim)
- Arnold Clerkx - (Ling Khi Tong)
- Larie Cook
- Robbert Damen - (Guardian, Prinses Simone)
- Margreet de Heer - (Discoveries in Comics, Stella, Mijntje)
- Phiny Dick - (Miezelientjee, Olle Kapoen, Birre Beer)
- Eppo Doeve - (Het Mannetje Bagatel, Kleine Isar, de Vierde Koning)
- Guido van Driel - (Toen we van de Duitsers Verloren)
- Toon van Driel - (F.C. Knudde)
- Jean Dulieu - (Paulus the woodgnome)
- Uco Egmond - (Eppo, Het Bordenvolkje, Junior & Co)
- Jan Dirk van Exter - (Rikki de Visser, Brommy & Tommy)
- Jan Feith - (Geschiedenis des Vaderlands)
- Flip Fermin - (Robur en Pennekamp)
- Albert Funke Küpper - (continued Snuffelgraag en Knagelijntje)
- Frans Funke Küpper - (Kobus Knol en Thijs Slof)
- Theo Funke Küpper - (De Verstrooide Professor)
- Joop Geesink - (Rick de Kikker, Loeki de Leeuw)
- Bastiaan Geleijnse - (Fokke en sukke)
- Evert Geradts - (co-founder of the magazine Tante Leny Presenteert, creator of the series Moe Koe, Jan Zeiloor, Karel Kater, De Muziekbuurters, Henk Hond, Mynga & Ramzy, Disney comics)
- Maarten Gerritsen - (Bruno de Bever, De Rampier, Disney comics, continued Jan, Jans en de Kinderen)
- Frits Godhelp - (Bas en van der Pluim, Disney comics)
- Floor de Goede - (Do You Know Flo?)
- Hans van Gorkom - (Hikkie)
- Dorith Graef - (Blunder Bennie, Nena's Vlog)
- Erik de Graaf - (Verzamelde Herinneringen)
- Henk Groeneveld - (Opa)
- Sander Gulien - (Disney comics)
- Gummbah - (Deirdre, Braaf Varken)
- Rick de Haas - (De Stoepjes)
- Jan van Haasteren - (Baron van Tast, Aafje Anders, Erik en Opa)
- Albert Hahn - (made comics for De Notenkraker)
- Joost Halbertsma
- Eelco Harmsen van Beek - (Flipje van Tiel, comics based on Noddy)
- Fritzi Harmsen van Beek - (continued Flipje van Tiel)
- Maaike Hartjes - (Maaike's Dagboek)
- Lo Hartog van Banda - (wrote scripts for Tom Poes, Panda, Eric de Noorman)
- Frans Hasselaar - (Hogwashed, Max, Veertigers, Beterman)
- Fred de Heij, A.K.A. Emiel Jansens - (Marloes, Fanny, Pulpman)
- Eric Heuvel - (January Jones, Bud Broadway)
- Mau Heymans - (Disney comics)
- Daniël, aka Daan, Hoeksema - (De Neef van Prikkebeen)
- Gerrie Hondius - (Ansje Tweedehansje)
- Boy ten Hove - (Piet en Puk, Jan Klaas)
- Milan Hulsing
- W.G. Van de Hulst - (In de Soete Suikerbol)
- Gerrit de Jager - (De Familie Doorzon, Roel en zijn beestenboel, Liefde en Geluk, Zusje)
- Maarten Janssens - (Banjer, Disney comics)
- Daan Jippes - (Bernard Voorzichtig, Disney comics, made some Lucky Luke stories)
- Aimée de Jongh - (Snippers, De Terugkeer van de Wespendief)
- Eddie de Jong - (Heinz)
- Leendert Jordaan - (Een Leven in Karikatuur)
- Fred Julsing - (Ukkie, Witte's Dagboek)
- Henk Kabos - (Tekko Taks)
- Henricus Kannegieter - (made various history comics)
- Patty Klein - (wrote for Noortje, Eppo, Disney comics, Hanna-Barbera comics, Schanulleke)
- J.H. Koeleman, Jr. - (Pinkie Pienter)
- Richard Klokkers - (assisted on comics by Marten Toonder)
- Ben van 't Klooster - (Filo Flop, Fiedeflier, worked for Marten Toonder)
- Yiri T. Kohl - (Bijlmer Boys)
- Hanco Kolk - (Gilles de Geus, S1NGLE, Meccano)
- Rie Kooyman - (Hoki en Poki)
- Hein de Kort - (Jean-Pierre, Pardon, Lul, Dirk en Desiree)
- Hein Kray
- Hans G. Kresse - (Eric de Noorman, Erwin de Noorman)
- Erik Kriek - (Gutsman)
- Robert van der Kroft - (Claire, continued Sjors en Sjimmie)
- Jan Kruis - (Jan, Jans en de Kinderen, continued Sjors en Sjimmie)
- Henk Kuijpers - (Franka)
- Jaap Lamberton - (continued Panda)
- Lamelos - (Kaasheld en Poephoofd)
- Yuri Landman - (Je Mag Alles Met Me Doen)
- Freddie Langeler - (Flipje van Tiel)
- Jeroen de Leijer - (Eefje Wentelteefje)
- Wim Lensen - (Sim en Pans, Professor Eureka, worked for Marten Toonder)
- Gerard Leever, aka Gleever - (Oktoknopie, Suus & Sas, Gleever's Dagboek)
- Jan Linse -
- Martin Lodewijk - (Agent 327, Johnny Goodbye)
- Co Loerakker - (Van Nul tot Nu, Wondege Wereld)
- Willy Lohmann - (Kraaienhove, Marco Silvester, drew comics for the Dutch version of Mad Magazine)
- Rein van Looy - (Dick Parker)
- Jan Lutz - (Wilko, de Zoon van de Roofridder)
- Peter Lutz - (Witje en Gitje, Prikkebeen Junior)
- Dick Maas - (Mug en Zifter)
- Maia Matches (born in Canada, later moved to the Netherlands) - (Ruby Riveter, Bitch)
- Dick Matena - (De Argonautjes, Grote Pyr, Ridder Roodhart, comics adaptations of classic literary novels)
- Alfred Mazure - (Dick Bos)
- Georges Mazure - (Myra van Dijk, Jacqueline, Maja knapt het wel op, Dolf Staal, Mignon, Paula, continued Spot Morton and Horre, Harm en Hella)
- Frenk Meeuwsen - (Zen Zonder Meester)
- Peter Mes - (B.B. Persfotograaf)
- Ellen Meske - (De Wilde Vaart van de Vlotter, Merik de Meeuw)
- Wim Meuldijk - (Sneeuwvlok de Eskimo, Ketelbinkie)
- Otto Milo
- Norbert Mirani - (Disney comics, Sesame Street comics)
- Henk van Munster - (Happy voor Kids)
- Michel Nadorp - (Max, Disney comics)
- Ray Nicholson - (assistant to F.C. Knudde)
- Bram Ohm - (Dikkie Dapper)
- Francine Oomen - (Hoe Overleef Ik..., Oomen Stroomt Over)
- Ruben Oppenheimer - (political satire comics)
- Minck Oosterveer - (Storm, Nicky Saxx, Zodiak, Jack Pott, Claudia Brücken)
- Aloys Oosterwijk - (Willem's Wereld)
- Hans van Oudenaarden - (Bob Evers, Rhonda, Puppy From Hell)
- Floris Oudshoorn - (Swamp Thing)
- Coco Ouwerkerk - (Acception)
- Lex Overeijnder - (comics version of De Fabeltjeskrant)
- Rob Phielix - (Quint en Co, Sam Sam, Neef Leo, Dolfje Weerwolfje, continued Jan, Jans en de Kinderen, Disney comics)
- Anton Pieck - (text comics for Zonneschijn)
- Jan-Roman Pikula - (Disney comics)
- Wilbert Plijnaar - (continued Sjors en Sjimmie, worked on Claire)
- Remco Polman - (Vera en Victor, Floris van Dondermonde)
- Peter Pontiac - (Kraut Biografiek, Requiem Fortissimo)
- Georges Van Raemdonck (born in Belgium, worked for the Dutch press) - (Bulletje en Boonestaak)
- Siem Praamsma - (Jochem Jofel, worked for Marten Toonder)
- Wil Raymakers - (Boes)
- Jan van Reek - (Wipperoen)
- Mark Retera - (DirkJan)
- Jasper Rietman - (Exodus)
- Joost Rietveld - (Kareltje)
- Willem Ritstier - (De Familie Best, Bartje, Harry Lipwitts, Gaaibaai, De Familie Iks, Soeperman, Zodiak, Nicky Saxx, Stanley, Anders, Flip)
- Henk Rotgans - (Jop, Joep en... Jippie, Snuffelgraag en Knagelijntje, Pietje Pluis en Jantje Joppe)
- Gerrit Rotman - (Snuffelgraag en Knagelijntje, Mijnheer Pimpelmans)
- Marnix Rueb - (Haagse Harry)
- Marcel Ruijters - (comics based on medieval themes)
- Martin Ruijters - (Toestanden in Suriname, De Iconoclast)
- Lae Schäfer -
- Flip van der Schalie - (Bollie Bof)
- Marc Scherbateyev - (Nudiske)
- Willy Schermelé - (Winkie)
- Bas Schuddeboom - (Krijn Zwaan)
- Ed van Schuijlenburg - (Disney comics, Hanna-Barbera comics)
- Eric Schreurs - (Joop Klepzeiker)
- Theo Seesing - (Complot in Rotterdam, een platenfeuilleton)
- Ger Sligte - (Mieke Meijer, Bertje Branie)
- Peter de Smet - (De Generaal)
- Mark Smeets
- Ton Smits - (Karel Kwiek)
- Henk Sprenger - (Piloot Storm, Kick Wilstra)
- Gerrit Stapel - (Otto van Irtin, Huon de Neveling, continued Arman & Ilva)
- Jeroen Steehouwer - (Katja, Pelle, Puppy)
- Jan Steeman - (Roel Dijkstra, Noortje)
- Lucas Steeman - (continued Noortje)
- Theo Steeman - (Joachim en Iris, Witte's Dagboek, Grijpstra en de Gier)
- Wim Stevenhagen - (co-creator of De Familie Doorzon and Roel en Zijn Beestenboel).
- Barbara Stok - (Barbaraal)
- Olaf Stoop - (Roza's Lotgevallen)
- Gerard van Straaten
- Peter van Straaten - (Vader & Zoon)
- Ruud Straatman - (Pien en Peer, Simon Spitsmuis, Royaal Modaal)
- Pax Steen - (Klompertje Klomp)
- Joost Swarte - (Katoen en Pinbal, Jopo de Pojo)
- Ton van Tast
- Paul Teng - (De Vrienden van Igor Steiner)
- Thé Tjong-Khing - (Iris, Arman & Ilva)
- Tommy A. - (Een Hondenleven, De Sprookjes van Prins Kat)
- Marten Toonder - (Tom Poes, Oliver B. Bumble, Panda, Kappie)
- Eiso Toonder - (De Goeroe)
- René Uilenbroek - (Koos de Supporter, Soeperman, Stanley)
- Bob van den Born - (Professor Pi)
- Jan-Dirk van Exter - (Brommy & Tommy)
- Leo van Noppen - (Preut, Ben Nul)
- Jean-Marc van Tol - (Fokke & Sukke)
- Gerben Valkema - (Elsje (in English: Lizzy), Tommy, worked on Jan, Jans en de Kinderen)
- Erik Varekamp - (Agent Orange)
- Henri van de Velde - (Het avontuur van Haverstok met den koffer van Verweegen en Kok)
- Jaap Vegter - (De Moderne Wereld)
- Alexander VerHuell - (Zijn er zoo, Zoo zijn er)
- Jaap Vermeij - (Winny de Wilde)
- Cor Versteeg - (Julius Hofnar)
- Michiel Van de Vijver - (Max, Charlie, continued Jan, Jans en de Kinderen, wrote Neef Leo)
- Dick Vlottes - (Minter en Hinter, comics version of De Fabeltjeskrant, Hanna-Barbera comics, Disney comics)
- Carol Voges - (De Avonturen van Pa Pinkelman, Tup en Joep)
- Ben van Voorn - (worked for Marten Toonder)
- Jan Van der Voo - (Ketelbinkie, comics based on Pipo de Clown)

- Peter Vos - (Sylvester en Sebastiaan)
- Toby Vos, aka Neeltje Vos
- Jan Vriends - (Janjaap, Cowboy John, Roos, Tina)
- Gé Wasco - (Apenootjes)
- Cees van de Weert - (worked for Marten Toonder)
- Jan Wesseling - (Marion)
- Ben Westervoorde - (De Muziekbuurters, Yvonne de Amazone, biographical graphic novel about André Hazes)
- Jan Wiegman
- Peter Wienk - (Nikkie, continued the Noddy comic)
- Wim van Wieringen - (Simpelman)
- Piet Wijn - (Douwe Dabbert, Holle Pinkel, Frank, de Vliegende Hollander)
- Roelof Wijtsma - (Arin, revived Roel Dijkstra)
- Henriette Willebeek le Mair - (redrew Der Struwwelpeter)
- Willem - (several political satirical comics)
- René Windig - (Heinz)
- Peter de Wit - (Sigmund, De Familie Fortuin, Burkababes, De Familie Fortuin, S1NGLE)
- Alex de Wolf - (Mops and Family)
- Piet Worm - (Professor Zegellak)
- Pieter Zandvliet
- Piet Zeeman - (wrote for Sjors en Sjimmie, Disney comics, Looney Tunes comics)

== New Zealand ==
- Avis Acres - (Twink and Wink, The Twinkle Twins, Hutu and Kawa)
- Celia Allison - (Cecily)
- Murray Ball - (Footrot Flats)
- Maurice Bramley - (Panel By Panel, drew war comics for Horwitz Publications)
- Debra Boyask - (made comics for Funtime)
- Grant Buist - (Jitterati, Brunswick)
- Mirranda Burton - (Hidden)
- Giselle Clarkson - (The Flood, Biscuits and Slices of New Zealand, Lestwee Forgetum)
- Jason Conlan - (On the Mat, Mister J and the Pirates)
- Noel Cook - (Kokey Koala)
- Helen Courtney - (made comics for Broadsheet)
- Martin Emond - (Accident Man)
- Scott Gray - (wrote for Uncanny X-Men: First Class)
- Dylan Horrocks - (Hicksville, scripted Batgirl)
- Robyn E. Kenealy - (Steve Rogers' American Captain)
- John Kent - (Varoomshka)
- Chris Knox - (Max Media)
- Roger Langridge - (Fred the Clown, Smithson)
- Sarah Laing - (Mansfield and Me)
- Jared Lane - (Progress)
- Tim Molloy - (Life on Earth, It Shines and Shakes and Laughs, Mr. Unpronounceable Adventures, Zombies on Ramsay Street)
- Indira Neville - (Nice Gravy)
- Kay O'Neill - (Princess Princess, The Tea Dragon Society)
- Craig Phillips - (Finchç, Giants, Trolls, Witches, Beasts: Ten Tales from the Deep Dark Woods)
- Eric Resetar - (Crash Carson of the Future, Crash O'Kane, An All Black on Mars)
- Ant Sang - (Filth The Dharma Punks, Shaolin Burning)
- Darren Schroeder - (Mopy)
- Burton Silver - (Bogor)
- Colin Wilson - (worked on Judge Dredd and La Jeunesse de Blueberry, Du Plomb Dans La Tête)
- Jem Yoshioka - (Circuits and Veins)

== Nigeria ==
- Murewa Ayodele
- Lemi Ghariokwu
- Siku

== Norway ==
(tegneserie, plural form: tegneserier)

- Håkon Aasnes - (Seidel og Tobram, Vi på Eiketun, Annika, Gråtass, Olsenbanden, Disney comics, continued Smørbukk and Nr. 91 Stomperud)
- Sverre Årnes - (Olsenbanden)
- Kaare Bratung - (Dagros, Baldrian, Professoren, Se og les)
- Tore Deinboll - (Den evige ilds land, Petter Framgutt)
- Noor Eckhoff - (Blør for drakta)
- Mads Eriksen - (M, Gnom)
- Martin Ernsten - (Sult)
- Malin Falch - (Nordlys)
- Anna Fiske - (Rabbel)
- Lars Fiske - (Matje, Olaf G., Kanon)
- Flis, A.K.A. Øyvind Sagåsen - (Radio Gaga)
- Torunn Grønbekk
- Karine Haaland - (Piray)
- Jorunn Hanto-Haugse - (Reveland, Reform 94, Skulen)
- Odd Harrong - Bokholder Blidberg, Harrongs Komikk, Blidberg og Stribert, Kjakan, Jumbo, Samegutten Anti, Knokkelmannen, Den Usynlige Mannen
- Jason
- Steffen Kverneland - (Peer Grynt, Rotta Rolf, Ynglinge Saga, Trikkekondukktøren, Olaf G., Kanon)
- Arild Midthun - (Patrick & Co, Sirkus)
- Bjørn Morisse - (Glåmrik)
- Tor Morisse
- Lise Myhre - (Nemi)
- Knut Nærum - (Bloid)
- Alf Næsheim - (Disney comics)
- Christopher Nielsen - (To Trøtte Typer)
- Jens R. Nilssen - (Smørbukk, Vangsgutane)
- Mikael Noguchi - (Drabant)
- Terje Nordberg - (Truls og Trine, Reodor og Teodor, Troll)
- Frode Øverli - (Pondus, A-laget, Deep Shit Junkies, Birger-Egil, Riskhospitalet)
- Bjørn Ousland - (Solruns Saga, Mumle Gåsegg, Soria Moria slott, Grimsborken)
- Ragnar Pedersen - (Amøbene)
- Tore Bernitz Pedersen - (Doktor Fantastisk)
- Siri Pettersen - (Anti-Klimaks, Kråkene)
- Hariton Pushwagner - (Soft City, continued Doktor Fantastisk)
- Øystein Runde - (Futen, De Fire Store)
- Inga Sætre - (Møkkajentene, Fallteknikk)
- Solveig Muren Sanden - (Tuss og Troll, continued Smørbukk)
- Hanne Sigbjørnsen, A.K.A. Tegnehanne - (Tegnehanne)
- Inga Sætre - (Møkkajentene: Pøh)
- Karstein Volle - (Fakta fra verden)
- Kristian B. Walters - (Pervo-Kris)

== Paraguay ==
- Robin Wood

== Philippines ==
(komiks) See List of Filipino comics creators

== Poland ==
- Tadeusz Baranowski
- Elisabeth Brozowska - (Josephine)
- Henryk Chmielewski
- Janusz Christa
- Tomasz Kołodziejczak
- Maciej Parowski
- Szarlota Pawel
- Grzegorz Rosiński - (Thorgal, The Great Power of the Chninkel)
- Jerzy Skarżyński
- Przemysław Truściński

== Portugal ==
(BD, Banda Desenhada, Histórias em Quadradinhos)

- María Alcobre
- Eduardo Teixeira Coelho
- Francisco Augusto Nogueira da Silva
- Rafael Bordalo Pinheiro
- Carlos Roque - (Malaquias, Angélique, Wladimyr)
- Rocha Vieira - (Fitas de Juca e Zeca, As Proezas de Necas e Tonecas)

== Romania ==
(Bandă desenată)

- Pompiliu Dumitrescu
- György Györfi-Deák
- Sandu Florea - (Galbar)
- Ion Popescu-Gopo
- Puiu Manu
- Lívia Rusz - (Mac, Cocofifi)
- Eugen Taru - (Barbăcot)

== Russia ==
(комикс)

- Bogdan - (Nika)
- Vera Brosgol
- Svetlana Chmakova - (The Adventures of CG, Chasing Rainbows, Nightschool, Awkward, Dramacon)
- Natalia Devova - (Exlibrium)
- Alina Erofeeva - (Exlibrium)
- Artyom Gabrelyanov - (writer of Major Grom, Demonslayer)
- Eric Gnoeff (also holds U.S. nationality) - (Rectum Errrectum, Further Adventures of Young Jeffrey Dahmer)
- Anton Gudim
- Janos Janecki - (Tuckered)
- Vyacheslav Kotyonochkin - (Nu, Pogodi!)
- Anatol Kovarsky
- Vincent Krassousky, A.K.A. Vica - (Vica)
- Sergei Kravchenko - (The Adventures of Captain Fibber)
- Đorđe Lobačev (also held Yugoslavian nationality) - (Biberče, Hurricane Comes to the Rescue)
- Dmitry Moor
- Marina Privalova - (Exlibrium)
- Sergej Repiov - (Staraja Skazka, A.K.A. Old Tale)
- Anatoliy Reznikov - (Leopold the Cat)
- Andrey Rodin - (Exlibrium)
- Ivan Semenov - (Karandash, Petia Ryzhik)
- Andrey Snegiryov - (Whirly Tales)
- Konstantin Tarasov - (Exlibrium, Major Grom)
- Yulia Zhuravlyova - (Exlibrium, Major Grom)
- Zahar - (Choob)

== Serbia ==
(стрип or strip, plural form: стрипови or stripovi)

- Dobrica Erić
- Aleksa Gajić
- Borivoje Grbić
- R. M. Guéra (pen name of Rajko Milošević)
- Zoran Janjetov
- Branislav Kerac (aka H. M. Baker)
- Boban Knežević
- Milan Konjević
- Dražen Kovačević
- Petar Meseldžija
- Zlatko Milenković - (Samo Strip)
- Jovan Nikolić
- Darko Perović
- Vujadin Radovanović
- Momčilo Rajin
- Gradimir Smudja
- Zoran Stefanović
- Rade Tovladijac
- Zoran Tucić
- Jugoslav Vlahović
- Dobrosav Živković
- Aleksandar Zograf (pen name of Saša Rakezić)
- Zdravko Zupan

== Singapore ==
- Foo Swee Chin

== Slovenia ==
- Marjan Amalietti
- Kostja Gatnik
- Miki Muster

== South Africa ==
- Conrad Botes - (Die Foster Bende)
- Andrew Cramer - (The Lil' Five, Week Daze)
- Jarred Cramer - (Juvies, Super-Dud)
- Danie Cronje - (Meester)
- Joe Daly - (Scrublands)
- Stephen Francis - (Madam & Eve)
- Ben Geldenhuys - (Cottonstar)
- T. O. Honiball - (Oom Kaspaas, Jakkals en Wolf, Adoonse van die Magaliesberge)
- Victor Ivanoff - (Kalie die Kuiken, Jors voer die Oorlog)
- Anton Kannemeyer, AKA Joe Dog - (Bitterkomix, Zeke and the Mine Snake, Pappa in Afrika)
- Deon de Lange - (Gofu, Tomica)
- David Covas Lourenco - (Tomica)
- Danelle Malan - (Cottonstar)
- Andy Mason - (The Big Chullum, Sloppy)
- Hugh McClelland - (Beelzebub Jones, Dan Doofer, Sunshine Falls, Jimpy, Jimmy Gimmicks)
- Karl Mostert - (The Lil' Five)
- Mogorosi Motshumi - (Sloppy, 360 Degrees)
- Jeremy Nell - (Urban Trash, Ditwits)
- Daniël du Plessis - (Jorik Jakkals)
- Rico Schacherl - (Madam & Eve)
- Ivan Semevsky - (Kolletjie)
- Themba Siwela - (Majimbos)
- Karlien de Villiers - (My Mother Was A Beautiful Woman)
- W.O. Wilson - (The Richleigh Family, The Wish Twins, Madge the Magician's Daughter)
- Zapiro

== South Korea ==
- Kang Full
- Lee So-young
- Jim Lee
- Tommy Yune

== Spain ==
(cómics, historietas, tebeos)

- Enrique Sánchez Abulí - (scripted Torpedo)
- Daniel Acuña - (worked for Marvel Comics and DC Comics)
- David Aja - (worked for Marvel Comics)
- Ambrós - (Capitán Trueno, El Caballero Fantasma, La Nava del Tiempo)
- Lola Anglada -
- Sergio Aragonés - (born in Spain, later moved to Mexico and the U.S.) - (Drawn-Out-Marginals and A Mad Look at... (in Mad Magazine), Groo the Wanderer)
- Man Arenas
- José Cabrero Arnal - (Pif le chien, Placid et Muzo)
- Rafael Aura León - (worked for Eerie, Creepy and Vampirella)
- Alfonso Azpiri - (Lorna, Mot)
- Carmen Barbará - (Mary Noticias)
- Ruma Barbero - (Marcianaes)
- Manuel Bartual - (Morón el Pollastre, Álex, Con Amigos Como Estos)
- Toni Batllori - (Ninots)
- José Beá - (Sir Leo, worked for Eerie, Creepy and Vampirella)
- Benejam - (Melitón Pérez, La Familia Ulises, Eustaquio Morcillón y Babalí)
- Luis Bermejo - (worked for Eerie, Creepy and Vampirella)
- Jordi Bernet - (Torpedo, Jonah Hex, Sarvan, Kraken, Cicca Dum-Dum, Clara de noche, continued Doña Urraca)
- Carla Berrocal - (El Brujo, Todas Putas)
- Jesús Blasco - (Cuto, Capitán Trueno, Anita Diminuta, Los Guerilleros)
- Sergio Bleda - (La Novia y la Ladrona, Melrose Pleasure, Hot Rockets, El Hijo de Kim)
- Jaime Brocal Remohí - (worked for Eerie and Creepy)
- Boixcar - (Hazañas Bélicas)
- Enric Bug - (The Speed Kills, Rockabilly de Verano)
- Joaquín Buigas (scripted La Familia Ulises)
- Raulo Cáceres - (comics for Warren Publishing and Wetcomix)
- Purita Campos - (Patty's World, also known as Esther y su Mundo, co-creator of Gina)
- Juan José Carbó - (Don Homobono, Robustiano Fortachón, El Penado 113, Plácido Guerra, Tonet, Ivanchito, )
- Calpurnio - (El Bueno de Cuttlas, Proyecto X, Mundo Plasma)
- Edgar Cantero
- Jaume Capdevila
- Ceesepe - (Slober)
- Joaquín Cera - ( Pafman, Dr. Pacostein, Los Xunguis)
- Guillermo Cifré - (El Repùorter Tribulete, Don Furcio Buscabollos, Civilón, Garabatos, Pepe Despiste, Cepillo Chivátez, Don Tele)
- Raúl Cimas - (scripted Demasiada Pasión por Lo Suyo)
- Anabel Colazo - (El cristal imposible, Teen Wolf, Nimio, Encuentros cercanos, Paranoidland, No mires atrás, Espada).
- Carlos Conti - (El Loco Carioco, Mi Tío Magdaleno, Apolino Tarúguez, Hombre de Negocios, La Vida Adormilada de Morfeo Pérez, Don Alirón y La Ciencia Ficcíon, Doctor No y su Ayudante Sí)
- Joan Cornellà
- Cristina Durán Costell - (Una Posibilidad entre Mil, Boja per tu, El Bote de Mermelada)
- Carlos Cruz González - (worked on Sergeant Kirk, Dan Dare and Phantom)
- Fernando Dagnino Guerra - (worked for DC Comics)
- Juan Díaz Canales - (scripted Blacksad)
- Edmond - (Jan Europa, Supernova, Doctor Impossible)
- Enrich - (El Caco Bonifacio, Montse, Amiga de los Animales, Totáinez, Don Inocencio, Don Toribio, el Conserje)
- Mauro Entrialgo - (Herminio Bolaextra, El Demonio Rojo, Ángel Sefija)
- José Escobar Saliente - (Zipi y Zape, Carpanta, Tres Pelos y Kid Pantera, Doña Tula, Suegra, Filomeno y su taxi Genovevo, Don Óptimo y Don Pésimo, Plim, El Magno, Terre y Moto)
- Esegé - (Neronius, Tito Sidecar, Pomponius Triponum, Don Pyme, Parsley)
- Carlos Ezquerra - (Judge Dredd, Strontium Dog, Just a Pilgrim, The Stainless Steel Rat)
- Fer - (Puti-Club, Historias Fermosas)
- Fernando Fernández - (Mosca, comics for Eerie and Vampirella)
- César Ferioli - (Disney comics)
- Pascal Ferry - (worked for Marvel Comics, DC Comics)
- Alfons Figueras - (Aspirino y Colodión, Topolino, el Último Héroe)
- Alfonso Font - (Historias Negras)
- Manel Fontdevila - (Para ti, Que Eres Joven, La Parejita S.A.)
- Carlos Freixas - ("Pistol" Jim)
- Víctor de la Fuente - (Haxtur, Amargo, Haggarth, Los Gringos)
- Rosa Galcerán - (Katy)
- Miguel Gallardo - (Makoki)
- Blas Gallego - (Dolly, Ben & Katie)
- José Luis García-López (born in Spain, later moved to Argentina and the United States) - (worked for DC Comics)
- Luis García Mozos - (Chroniques de l'Innomé, worked for Eerie, Creepy)
- Carlos Giménez - (El Gringo, Delta 99, Dani Futuro, Paracuellos, Dossieres Mystère, Érase una vez el futuro, Los Profesionales, Historias de sexo y chapuza)
- Esther González - Miss Pad Thai.
- José González - (worked on Vampirella)
- Gosset - (Les Presentamos a Berta, Hug, el Troglodita, Facundo da la vuelta al mundo, Domingón, Roquita, Carpeto Veto, Burrus and Sapiens)
- Carlos Grangel - (worked on Fix und Foxi, Disney comics)
- Juanjo Guarnido - (Blacksad)
- Francisco Ibáñez Talavera - (Mortadelo y Filemon, 13, Rue del Percebe, El botones Sacarino, Rompetechos, Pepe Gotera y Otilio, Chicha, Tato y Clodoveo)
- Jan - (Superlópez, Pulgarcito)
- Oscar Jimenez - (worked for DC Comics and Marvel Comics)
- Jorge - (Doña Urraca, Melindro Gutiérrez, El Vagabundo Mostacho, Leovigildo Viruta, Tallarín López, Orlando Cucala, Sisebuto, Detective Astuto, Margarita Gutiérrez, Doña Filo)
- Lluís Juste de Nin
- Kano - (worked for Marvel Comics)
- K-Hito - (Gutiérrez, Macaco, Currinche, Don Turulato)
- Jordi Lafebre - (El Mundo de Judy, Les Beaux Étés)
- David Lafuente - (Phénix, Kabur, worked for Marvel Comics)
- Angeles Felices Lancina - (worked for the Dutch girls' magazine Tina)
- José Ramón Larraz - (scripted Paul Foran)
- Salvador Larroca - (made comics for Marvel Comics)
- Jorge Longarón - (Arsénico Lupin, Friday Foster)
- David López - (worked for DC Comics)
- Joan March - (El Mini Rey, Tranqui y Tronco, Ruperto, Calixto y Damián, Ataúlfo y Gedeón, La Familia Potosi, Don Meñique, Maxtron, Todos Estamos Locos, Los Peláez)
- Rafael Marín - (scripted for Marvel Comics)
- Marcos Martín - (worked for Marvel Comics, DC Comics)
- Miguel Ángel Martín - (Psychopathia Sexualis, Cyberfreak, Brian the Brain)
- Esteban Maroto - (Trinca, Dax the Warrior)
- Francisco Martín Morales - (Pilícleto, Casimiro el Caco, La Monocloaca)
- Félix Mas - (drew comics for Creepy and Vampirella)
- Max - (Peter Pank)
- Jesús Merino - (worked for DC Comics)
- Miguel Mihura - (made pantomime comics)
- Ana Miralles - (Eva Médusa, Djinn)
- Isidro Monés - (Götterdämmerung, made comics for Creepy, Eerie and Vampirella)
- Albert Monteys - (Mondo Lirondo, Paco's Bar, Tato, Con Moto y Sin Contrato, Para ti, Que Eres Joven, Carlito's Fax)
- Victor Mora - (scripted El Capitán Trueno, El Jabato, Dani Futuro, El Cosaco Verde, El Corsario de Hierro, Chroniques de l'innomé)
- Sergio S. Morán - (¡Eh, tío!, El Vosqué)
- Arturo Moreno - (León y Arpón, Cuqui, Pinky Trotamundos, Ciclonín, Jacin Too)
- Pepe Moreno - (worked for DC Comics)
- Victor Moscoso (born in Spain, later moved to the U.S.)
- Luis García Mozos - (Vampirella)
- José Luis Munuera - (Nävis, continued Spirou et Fantasio)
- Ken Niimura - (I Kill Giants)
- Ana Oncina - (Croqueta y empanadilla)
- Cris Ortega - (Forgotten)
- Francisco Ortega Orozco - (co-creator of Gina)
- José Ortiz - (Hombre, Jack el Destripador, Morgan, Burton & Cyb)
- Carlos Pacheco - (Arrowsmith, worked for Marvel Comics, DC Comics)
- Antonio Palacios - (Mac Coy, Garin)
- Andrés Palomino - (Las Crónicas PSN)
- Pepita Pardell - (made comics for Ediciones Toray)
- Fernando Pasarin - (worked for DC Comics)
- Maria Pascual Alberich - (Rosas Blancas, Sissi)
- José Peñarroya - (Don Pío, Gordito Relleno, Don Berrinche, La Familia Pi, Floripondia Piripi, Pepe, el Hincha, Pitagorín)
- Laura Pérez Vernetti - (Macande, Sarà Servito, Las Mil y una Noches, Amores Locos, El Briallación del Gato Negro)
- Picanyol - (Ot el bruixot)
- Carlos Pino - (worked on Ro-Busters, Judge Dredd)
- Miguelanxo Prado - (Trazo de Tiza)
- Moderna de Pueblo (pseudonym of Raquel Córcoles) - (Soy de Pueblo, Cooltureta)
- Javier Pulido - (worked for DC Comics, Marvel Comics)
- Raf - (El Zorro, Gumersindo Borrego, Levy Berzotas, Cantinflas, Doña Lío Portapartes, Don Pelmazo Bla, bla, bla, El Capitán Aparejo, Doña Tecla Bisturín, Manolón, Conductor de Camión, Sir Tim O'Theo, Mirlowe y Violeta, Zomby el Gato, La Fragate Capadora)
- Juan Carlos Ramis - (Dirty Pig, Alfalfo Romeo, Estrellito Castro, Sporty, Doctor Burillo, Los Xunquis)
- Jesus Redondo - (worked on El Capitán Trueno)
- Raquel Riba - (Lola Vendetta)
- Emma Ríos - (Mirror, Pretty Deadly)
- Paco Roca - (Arrugas)
- Javier Rodríguez - (Paraíso, Punk Rock Bar, Tenebro, Comprobando la Realidad, Crononautas, worked for DC Comics and Marvel Comics)
- Arturo Rojas de la Cámara - (Cucharito, Nabucondonosor, Gedeon, El Genio Eustaquio, Agente 7-7 a la Izquierda, Don Percebe y Basilio, Anibal)
- Enrique Badía Romero - (Modesty Blaise, AXA)
- Jordi Badía Romero - (worked for Fleetway Publications and DC Thomson)
- Romeu - (Miguelito)
- Juan José Ryp - (Black Summer, No Hero)
- Armando Salas - (Adan, Jauja y Colas, Merlina, Don Teleneco)
- Leopoldo Sánchez - (Bogey)
- José Sanchis Grau - (Pumby, Robín Robot, El Soldadito Pepe, worked on The Phantom)
- Víctor Santos - (Los Reyes Elfos, Pulp Héroes)
- Martz Schmidt - (Pinocho, Don Danubio, Personaje Influyente, El Doctor Cataplasma, Troglodito, El Profesor Tragacanto y su Clase que es de Espanto, La Pandilla Cu-Cux Plaf, El Sherrif Chiquito, Deliranta Rococó, continued Doña Urraca)
- Vicente Segrelles - (El Mercenario)
- Antonio Segura - (scripted Hombre, Orka, Bogey, Sarvan, Kraken, Eva Medusa, Jack el Destripador, Burton & Cyb)
- Fermín Solís
- Manfred Sommer - (Frank Cappa, El Lobo Solitario, Polux, El Tigre)
- Trini Tinturé – (Emma es encantadora)
- Ramon Torrents - (drew comics for Creepy and Eerie)
- Daniel Torres - (Rocco Vargas, Tom)
- Asisko Urmeneta - (Eusklabo Alaiak, AztiHitza: Xahoren Biografikoa)
- Angel Unzueta - (worked for DC Comics, Marvel Comics)
- Eduardo Vañó Pastor - (Roberto Alcázar y Pedrín, Bob Tayler and Ray Charles, Corazón de Acro, Milton de Corsair)
- Vanyo - (worked on Judge Dredd)
- Alberto Vázquez - (Freda, Pscionautas, El Evangelio de Judas, Psiconautas (Birdboy))
- Manuel Vázquez Gallego - (Las hermanas Gilda, Anacleto, agente secreto, La familia Cebolleta)
- Bernardo Vergara - (Urbano, Harry Pórrez, Los Ilegales, Piso Para Quatro)
- Laura Pérez Vernetti
- Joan Vizcarra
- Joaquín Xaudaró
- Xuasus - (worked on Judge Hershey, Teenage Mutant Ninja Turtles)

== Sweden ==
(tecknad serie)

- Lena Ackebo
- Max Andersson
- Rune Andréasson - (Bamse, Pellefant)
- Jan Berglin
- Torsten Bjarre - (Flygsoldat 113 Bom, Lilla Fridolf, Oscar)
- Inger Edelfeldt - (Hondjuret)
- Nils Egerbrandt - (Frisk och Rask)
- Måns Gahrton - (Agent Annorlunda, Eva & Adam)
- Simon Gärdenfors
- Ester Gill - (Lillans Morgongröt, Den Egenkära Gunilla, Sara)
- Rolf Gohs
- Lars Hillersberg
- Oscar Jacobsson - (Adamson)
- Mats Jonsson
- Martin Kellerman - (Rocky)
- Gösta Knutsson - (Pelle Svanslös)
- Gunnar Krantz
- Carl Larsson
- Bruno Liljefors
- David Liljemark
- Joakim Lindengren
- Ulf Lundkvist
- Jan Lööf - (Felix)
- Bia Melin - (continued Agust och Lotta)
- Coco Moodysson - (Coco Platina Titan, Never Goodnight)
- Lars Mortimer - (Bobo)
- David Nessle
- Jenny Nyström
- O.A. (a.k.a. Oskar Andersson) - (Mannen Som Gör Vad Som Faller Honom In, Urhunden)
- Mikael Oskarsson
- Rudolf Petersson - (91:an)
- Elov Persson - (Kronblom, Agust och Lotta)
- Gunnar Persson - (Gus, Herr Larsson, Ur Klackamo Dagbok, continued Kronblom, scripted Flygsoldat 113 Bom,Konstapel Knut and Frisk och Rask)
- Ingvar Persson - (Frid och Fröjd, continued Agust och Lotta)
- Jonas Persson - (continued Kronblom)
- Joakim Pirinen - (Socker-Conny)
- Rit-Ola (a.k.a. Jan-Erik Garland)
- Jan Romare - (Pyton, Himlens änglar, Ur Igelkotten Huberts Dagbok, Gorilla Gusten, Mullvalden Malte, Ugglan Urban)
- Inger and Lasse Sandberg
- Semitjov, Eugen - (Allan Kämpe)
- Johan Tobias Sergel
- Gunila Stierngranat - (Lila Lena och Jon Blund, Lille Göran och Jon Blund, Lasseman och Hans Vänner, Snövit, Morfars Barndomsminnen, Eva-Maria och Ingegegerd)
- Cecilia Torudd
- Bertil Wilhelmsson - (Uncas, Swedish versions of The Phantom)

== Switzerland ==
- Alain Auderset - (Willy Grunch, Marcel, ROBI)
- Patrick Chappatte
- Fernand Cheneval - (born in Switzerland, later moved to Belgium) (founder of Heroïc Albums)
- Cosey - (Jonathan, À La Recherche de Peter Pan)
- Derib - (Yakari, Buddy Longway, Celui Qui Est Né Deux Fois, Red Road)
- Job - (Yakari)
- Robert Lips - (Globi)
- Enrico Marini - (Gipsy, Le Scorpion)
- Rafael Morales - (assistant of Jacques Martin)
- Frederik Peeters - (Blue Pills, Pachyderme, Lupus, RG, Koma, Sandcastle, Aâma)
- Gérald Poussin - (Buddy et Flappo)
- Laurence Suhner - (Rastapanique, Zozo Zata, Éclats d'Âme, Le Secret de Chimneys, Dame Jeanne, Eclipse, Le Chaman, Confidences)
- Rodolphe Töpffer - (Histoire de Mr. Vieux Bois)
- Valp (Valentine Pasche) - (Lock, Ashrel)
- Hansrudi Wäscher - (Sigurd, Akim, Tibor)
- Pierre Wazem - (La Fin Du Monde)
- Zep - (Titeuf)

== Taiwan ==
- Jo Chen

== Thailand ==
- Chai Rachawat - (Phuyai Ma kap Thung Ma Moen)
- Ongart Chaicharncheep - (Hua Taeng Mo)
- Phot Chaiya -
- Duang Chang Chatree
- Prayoon Chanyavongs - (Sooklek)
- Dtohn - (Zen, The Farmer Man)
- Veerachai Duangpla - (The Story Begins With..., Blackboy)
- Aehk Ga Chohng - (Dtam Ruaat a Wa Gaa, Tthook Khohn Roht)
- Arifen Hazanee, aka Aareefaehn Hasaanee, aka Moo Ninja - (The Flowergirl and Mr. Clumsy, Ramavatar, Ruampol kon Rakorn)
- Hem Vejakorn
- Jakraphan Huaypetch - (Flyff, Super Dunker)
- Prema Jatukanyaprateep - (Bokbig)
- Phohn Khaao Soht
- Montri Khumruen - (Ogre King)
- Khun - (Lord Suriya)
- Khun So
- Phadung Kraisri - (Fai Sohn Saaep Sai, Noohin, Koonamin)
- Krit
- Kuad - (Khaabprajam Amchet, Sai lub chon air)
- Jamnuun Leksohmthit
- Soophala Maehnahkohm - (Willy the Chicken)
- Payut Ngaokrachang
- Ottanoi -
- Watthana Petrasuwan
- Suchart Phromrungrot - (The Funny Kingdom)
- Raphi Phuwong
- Wisut Ponnimit - (Mamuang)
- Pungpomprompancha
- Pakdee Saentaweesuk - (Pangpond)
- Mangohk Sarohp - (Killer, Gene)
- Raatluuhr Suaang - (Seuung ha Dam, Jaawm Kha Mang Waeht)
- Supot Anawatkochakorn, aka Supot A - (Apaimanee Saga)
- Vithit Utsahajit
- Wacharapon -
- Panuwat Wattananukul - (EXEcutional)
- Yoot Tha Phuum - (Three, Chat)

== Turkey ==
- Oğuz Aral
- Mahmud A. Asrar
- Deniz Camp
- Yıldıray Çınar
- Cem Şeker - (Buruşuklar, Serengeti Marjinalleri and Tomurcuk)

== United Kingdom ==
- Nick Abadzis – (Laika)
- Martin Aitchison – (Luck of the Legion)
- Barry Appleby – (The Gambols)
- Barrie Appleby – (Roger the Dodger, Cuddles and Dimples, Pirates of the Caribeano)
- Mabel Lucie Attwell – (Wot A Life)
- Nigel Auchterlounie – (Comics in The Dandy)
- Bruce Bairnsfather – (Old Bill)
- Julius Stafford Baker II – (The Bruin Boys (aka Tiger Tim), Casey Court)
- Julius Stafford Baker III – (continued Tiger Tim)
- Edgar Henry Banger, aka Harry Banger – (Koko the Pup, Chubb and Tubb, Skitt the Kat, Stoogie, Dilly Duckling, Boney Prince Charlie, Dudley Dudd the Dud Detective, Slicksure the Famous Secret Agent, Tornado Tom, What Price Glory)
- Clive Barker – (Ectokid, Hokum & Hex, Hyperkind, Saint Sinner)
- Les Barton – (Billy Bunter)
- Leo Baxendale – (The Bash Street Kids, Minnie the Minx, The Three Bears, Sweeny Toddler, Eagle Eye, Junior Spy, Grimley Fiendish)
- Glen Baxter
- William Giles Baxter – (continued Ally Sloper)
- Gabrielle Bell – (Lucky)
- Gordon Bell – (Pup Parade, Spoofer McGraw)
- Steve Bell – (If)
- Frank Bellamy – (Fraser of Africa, Heros the Spartan, Garth, continued Dan Dare)
- Hannah Berry – (Britten and Brülightly, Adamtine, Vox Pop, LiveStock, Premeditations).
- Alfred Bestall – (continued Rupert Bear)
- Basil Blackaller – (creator of Hairy Dan, Ace O' Hara, Captain Falcon, continued Pansy Potter)
- Nick Brennan – (Blinky, Crazy for Daisy)
- Bertie Brown – (comics based on Charlie Chaplin and other celebrities, Jessie Boy, Smiler and Smudge)
- Mark Buckingham – (Miracleman)
- Sid Burgon – (Bookworm, Joker, Ivor Lott and Tony Broke)
- Mike Butterworth – (Trigan Empire)
- Eddie Campbell – (Bacchus, From Hell)
- Mike Carey – (Lucifer)
- Reg Carter – (Big Eggo)
- S.J. Cash – (various funny animal comics)
- C.H. Chapman – (Billy Bunter)
- Derek Chittock – (Bennie, Barley Bottom)
- Chris Claremont – ( The Uncanny X-Men)
- Simon Coleby – (Midnighter, Wildstorm: Armageddon)
- E. George Cowan – (Robot Archie)
- Joe Colquhoun – (Roy of the Rovers)
- Dennis Collins – (The Perishers)
- Phil Corbett – (continued Korky the Cat)
- James Crighton – (Korky the Cat)
- Glenn Dakin – (Paris, The Man of Plaster, Sinister Romance, Mr. Day and Mr. Night, Greenhouse Warriors, The Man From Cancer)
- Reginald Ben Davis – (Jill Crusoe, Castaway)
- Roland Davies – (Come On, Steve, Sparks and Flash, Roddy the Road Scout)
- Wilbur Dawbarn – (Comics for The Dandy)
- Mike Dawson – (Freddie & Me, Ace-Face, Gagaboo!)
- Henry Louis Diamond – (Mikey Midge the Merry Midget, Bertie Bounce the Bonny Bounder)
- Frank Dickens – (Bristow)
- Karl Dixon – (Ollie Fliptrik, Secret Agent Sally)
- Cecil Langley Doughty - (Dick Turpin) for Thriller Comics Library
- Maurice Dodd – (The Perishers)
- Harold C. Earnshaw – (The Pater)
- Jack Edward Oliver – (Master Mind, Cliff Hanger, Vid Kid)
- Phil Elliott – (Greenhouse Warriors, Mr. Night, The Man from Cancer, The Suttons, A Tale from Gimbley, Blite)
- Warren Ellis – (Transmetropolitan, The Authority)
- Garth Ennis – (Preacher)
- Robin and Lawrence Etherington – (Monkey Nuts, Baggage, Yore!)
- Garen Ewing – (The Rainbow Orchid)
- Glenn Fabry – (Hellblazer, Sláine)
- Andy Fanton – (comics for The Dandy, The Astonishing Adventures of Lord Likely, The Carotty Kid)
- Bert Felstead – (Leo the Friendly Lion, Little Joe)
- Charles Folkard – (Teddy Tail)
- Harry Folkard – (Billy Bimbo and Peter Porker, continued Teddy Tail)
- Herbert Sidney Foxwell – (The Bunty Boys, continued Tiger Tim and Teddy Tail)
- Evelyn Flinders – (The Silent Three)
- Tome Frame – (2000 AD)
- Neil Gaiman – (co-creator of The Sandman)
- John Geering – (Bananaman, Puss 'n' Boots, Smudge)
- Dave Gibbons – (Watchmen)
- Denis Gifford – (Streamline)
- William St. John Glenn – (Oscar, Dorothea, Ballyscunnion, continued Teddy Tail)
- Barry Glennard – (comics for The Beano)
- Chick Gordon – (Spadger Isle, Bamboo Town)
- Jack Gordon – (worked for The Beano, among other magazines)
- Bernard Graddon - (Just Jake)
- Charles Grigg – (continued Korky the Cat)
- Paul Grist – (Kane, Jack Staff)
- David Gudgeon – (continued Korky the Cat)
- Frank Hampson – (Dan Dare)
- Harry Hanan – (Louie)
- Lewis Hancox – (Welcome to St. Hell: My Trans Teen Misadventure)
- Harry Hargreaves – (Pansy Potter, The Hayseeds)
- Ken H. Harrison – (Skookum School, Spookum Skool, Skookum School, Robbie Rebel)
- Harry Helmsley – (made comics for Ally Sloper's Own Magazine and Ovaltiney's Own Comic)
- Jamie Hewlett – (Tank Girl, co-creator of Gorillaz)
- Mike Higgs
- Bert Hill – (Charlie Chuckle, Barnacle Ben, the Breezy Buccaneer, Freddie Freewheel the Tramp Cyclist, Sammy Spry, Frolics in the Far West, Tommy Trot the Tudor Tramp, Harry Coe, P.C. Copperclock the Desert Cop, Willie Scribble the Pavement Artist, Lil and Lena)
- Bert Hill (different artist than the above) – (Louis & Louise and various girls' comics for DC Thomson and IPC)
- Harry Hill – (writer of Harry Hill's Real Life Adventures in TV Land)
- Henry George Hine – (Mr. Crindle's Rapid Career Upon Town)
- Jim Holdaway – (Modesty Blaise, continued Romeo Brown)
- Tim Hunkin – (The Rudiments of Wisdom)
- Anthony Hutchings – (Beastenders)
- Gordon Hutchings – (Num Num and his Funny Family, continued Gulliver Guinea-Pig)
- Roger Hutchings – (Disney comics)
- Tony Hutchings – (comics for nursery rhyme magazines)
- Paul Jenkins (Hellblazer, The Spectacular Spider-Man, The Sentry)
- Jock
- Sydney Jordan – (Jeff Hawke)
- Malcolm Judge – (Colonel Crackpot's Circus, The Numskulls, Billy Whizz, Ball Boy)
- Ted Kearon – (Robot Archie)
- Bertram Lamb – (Pip, Squeak and Wilfred)
- G. Larkman – (made several gag comics for Amalgamated Press and Target Books)
- David Law – (Dennis the Menace and Gnasher, Beryl the Peril, Corporal Clott)
- Don Lawrence – (Trigan Empire, Storm)
- Tony Lee – (writer for Marvel Comics)
- Alfred Leete – (Schmidt the Spy, Bosch)
- Peter Maddocks - (Four D. Jones, Nr. 10, Penny Crayon)
- Arthur Martin – (continued Billy Bunter and Casey Court)
- Malky McCormick – (The Big Yin)
- Dave McKean – (co-author of Arkham Asylum: A Serious House on Serious Earth, Signal to Noise, The Tragical Comedy or Comical Tragedy of Mr. Punch, Cages, Celluloid)
- Mike McMahon – (ABC Warriors, The V.C.s)
- Kieran Meehan - (Pros & Cons)
- Philip Mendoza – (The Man You'd Like to Kick, Princess Petal, Gulliver Guinea-Pig, Katie Country Mouse, Winifred and Stephanie)
- Metaphrog – (Louis)
- Trevor Metcalfe – (Sweet Tooth, Junior Rotter, Birdman and Chicken)
- Bill Mevin – (Wee Sporty, comics based on Doctor Who, The Soapremes, continued The Perishers)
- Mark Millar – (writer of Marvel's Ultimate X-Men, The Ultimates)
- Peter Milligan – (writer on Shade, the Changing Man and X-Statix)
- Pat Mills – (2000 AD)
- Frank Minnitt – (continued Billy Bunter)
- Alan Moore – (writer of Watchmen, V for Vendetta, Swamp Thing, The League of Extraordinary Gentlemen)
- Steve Moore (1949–2014)
- Allan Morley (Keyhole Kate, Hungry Horace, Freddy the Fearless Fly)
- Grant Morrison – (The Invisibles; writer of Animal Man, JLA)
- Dave Mostyn – (Strange Hill ("The Dandy" version))
- Vic Neill – (Tim Traveller, The McTickles, Wee Ben Nevis, Plug)
- Robert Nixon – (Ivy the Terrible, The 12½p Buytonic Boy, continued Korky the Cat)
- Gary Northfield – (Derek the Sheep)
- Peter O'Donnell – (writer Modesty Blaise, continued Romeo Brown)
- Kevin O'Neill – (Marshal Law, Nemesis the Warlock, The League of Extraordinary Gentlemen)
- David Parkins – (continued Billy Whizz, Fred's Bed)
- Nigel Parkinson – (Olaff the Madlander)
- Reg Parlett – (continued Billy Bunter; created Mustapha Million, Bonehead, Disappearing Trix, Kid Gloves, It's a Nice Life, Fright School, Beastenders)
- Tom Paterson – (Calamity James, School Belle)
- Charlie Pease, aka A.T Pease – (Buck an' Nero, Mighty Monk, Plum and Duff, Dickie Duffer, Sally Sunshine and Her Shadow, Artie the Autograph Hunter, continued Billy Bunter and Casey Court)
- H.E. Pease – (Professor Jolly and his Magic Brolly, Cas of Cosnem's College, Tich the Tiny Tec)
- Frank S. Pepper – (Roy of the Rovers)
- Nick Percival – (Legends: The Enchanted)
- S.K. Perkins, British comics artist (Spadger's XI, The Adventures of Elsie, Winnie and Johnny, Smiler the Sweeper)
- Jim Petrie – (Fatty Fudge)
- Sean Phillips – (Criminal, Incognito, Marvel Zombies)
- Alan Philpott - (Robot Archie)
- Woodrow Phoenix – (Sumo Family, Pants Ant, Where's it at, Sugar Kat?)
- Frank Quitely (born 1968)
- Arthur Potts – (Pickles, continued Teddy Tail)
- Ken Reid – (Roger the Dodger, Jonah, Faceache)
- Frank Richards (pseudonym of Charles Hamilton) – (Billy Bunter)
- John Ridgway – (Young Marvelman)
- Andy Riley – (The Book of Bunny Suicides)
- Bill Ritchie – (Smiffy, Baby Crockett)
- John Rushby – (Team Toxic)
- James Dale Robinson – (writer of Starman, Leave It to Chance)
- Paul Sample – (Ogri)
- Duncan Scott – (Stripz, Colin the Vet)
- Ronald Searle – (St Trinian's School)
- Liam Sharp – (Testament)
- Posy Simmonds – (Gemma Bovery, Tamara Drewe)
- Lew Stringer - (Tom Thug, Pete and His Pimple, Combat Colin, Suburban Satanists, Derek the Troll)
- George Studdy – (Bonzo the dog)
- David Sutherland – (Totally Gross Germs, Rasher)
- Kev F. Sutherland – (writer-artist of The Beano)
- Bryan Talbot – (The Adventures of Luther Arkwright, Heart of Empire, Dotter of Her Father's Eyes)
- Mabel Francis Taylor – (The Little Sparrowkins, continued Jungle Jinks)
- Norman Thelwell – (Chicko, Penelope and Kipper)
- Bill Tidy – (The Fosdyke Saga, The Cloggies, Kegbuster, Dr. Whittle, Grimbledon Down)
- Trog (real name: Wally Fawkes) – (Flook)
- Mary Tourtel – (Rupert Bear)
- Jim Turnbull – (continued Freddie the Frog, Teddy Toad)
- Amby Vaingankar - AmbyComics, also known as Gotta Sketch 'Em All.
- Kev Walker – (continued Judge Dredd)
- Arnold Warden – (Snowdrop's Zoo, Tuffy and his Magic Tail).
- Dudley D. Watkins – (Biffo the Bear, Oor Wullie, The Broons, Jimmy and his Magic Patch, Morgyn the Mighty, Mickey the Monkey)
- John Millar Watt – (Pop)
- Mike Western – (Billy's Boots)
- Arthur White – (Jungle Jinks, Fun on Board the Mary Anne, Tom Bowline, Rupert the Chick)
- Alexander Williams - (Queen's Counsel, A.K.A. King's Counsel)
- John Willie – (Sweet Gwendoline)
- Barry Windsor-Smith – (Conan the Barbarian, Rune)
- Peter Woolcock – (Freddie the Frog, The Merry Tales of Mimi and Marny, continued Tiger Tim)
- Reg Wootton – (Sporting Sam)
- David Wright - Carol Day
- Bert Wymer – (continued Tiger Tim)

== United States ==
See List of American comics creators

== Uruguay ==
- Eduardo Barreto – (worked for DC Comics)
- Richard Bennett Lamas – (worked for Marvel Comics)
- Alberto Breccia – (Mort Cinder, El Eternauta, Sherlock Time, Vida del Che, Evita, vida y obra de Eva Perón, continued Ernie Pike)
- Diego Jourdan – (worked on DC Thomson comic series like Ivy the Terrible and Oor Wullie)
- Jorge Lucas – (El Cazador de Aventuras, worked for Marvel Comics)
- Julio E. Suárez – (Peloduro)
- Tabaré – (Diogenes y el Linyera, El Romancero del Eustaquio, Vida Interior, Don Chipote de Pampa, El Cacique Paja Brava, Bicherío, Bosquivia)

== Vietnam ==
- Tak Bui - (PC and Pixel, Cheap Thrills Cuisine)
- Đào Hải - (Tý Quậy)
- Lê Linh - (Thần đồng Đất Việt)
- Hoang Nguyen - (worked for Marvel Comics, Dark Horse Comics)
- Nguyễn Hùng Lân - (Dũng sĩ Hesman)
- Nguyễn Tài cùng - (Linda Kiều)
- Kim Khánh - (Trạng Quỳnh – Trạng Quỷnh)
- Lê Văn Nghĩa - (Linda Kiều)
- Phan Thị Giao Chi - (Mai Mơ và Chi Li)

== See also ==
- Cartoonist
- List of comics creators appearing in comics
- List of Batman creators
- List of cartoonists
- List of Green Lantern creators
- List of Hellblazer creators
- List of Marvel Comics people
- List of minicomics creators
- List of Silver Age comics creators
- List of Superman creators

== Sources ==
"Aart Clerkx." Lambiek.net. N.p., 01 Jan. 1970. Web. 15 May 2019.

"Alain Dodier." Lambiek.net. N.p., 01 Jan. 1970. Web. 14 May 2019.

"Albert Funke Küpper." Lambiek.net. N.p., 01 Jan. 1970. Web. 15 May 2019.

"Antoon Herckenrath." Lambiek.net. N.p., 01 Jan. 1970. Web. 14 May 2019.

"Arnold H. Clerkx." Lambiek.net. N.p., 01 Jan. 1970. Web. 15 May 2019.

"Arturo Lanteri." Lambiek.net. N.p., 01 Jan. 1970. Web. 14 May 2019.

"Brösel." Lambiek.net. N.p., 01 Jan. 1970. Web. 14 May 2019.

"Carry Brugman." Lambiek.net. N.p., 01 Jan. 1970. Web. 15 May 2019.

"Comiclopedia - Illustrated Artist Compendium." Lambiek.net. N.p., n.d. Web. 14 May 2019.

"Dik Bruynesteyn." Lambiek.net. N.p., 01 Jan. 1970. Web. 15 May 2019.

"Dr. Heinrich Hoffmann." Lambiek.net. N.p., 01 Jan. 1970. Web. 15 May 2019.

"E. O. Plauen." Lambiek.net. N.p., n.d. Web. 15 May 2019.

"Evert Geradts." Lambiek.net. N.p., 01 Jan. 1970. Web. 15 May 2019.

"Flip Fermin." Lambiek.net. N.p., 01 Jan. 1970. Web. 15 May 2019.

"Floor De Goede." Lambiek.net. N.p., 01 Jan. 1970. Web. 15 May 2019.

"Frans Funke Küpper." Lambiek.net. N.p., 01 Jan. 1970. Web. 15 May 2019.

"Frederik Bramming." Lambiek.net. N.p., 01 Jan. 1970. Web. 14 May 2019.

"Frits Godhelp." Lambiek.net. N.p., 01 Jan. 1970. Web. 15 May 2019.

"GoT." Lambiek.net. N.p., 01 Jan. 1970. Web. 14 May 2019.

"Guido Van Driel." Lambiek.net. N.p., 01 Jan. 1970. Web. 15 May 2019.

"Harry Buckinx." Lambiek.net. N.p., 01 Jan. 1970. Web. 15 May 2019.

"Henk Backer." Lambiek.net. N.p., 01 Jan. 1970. Web. 15 May 2019.

"Jacques Laudy." Lambiek.net. N.p., 01 Jan. 1970. Web. 14 May 2019.

"Jacques Van Melkebeke." Lambiek.net. N.p., 01 Jan. 1970. Web. 14 May 2019.

"Jamiri." Lambiek.net. N.p., n.d. Web. 15 May 2019.

"Jan Dirk Van Exter." Lambiek.net. N.p., 01 Jan. 1970. Web. 15 May 2019.

"Jan Feith." Lambiek.net. N.p., 01 Jan. 1970. Web. 15 May 2019.

"Joop Geesink." Lambiek.net. N.p., 01 Jan. 1970. Web. 15 May 2019.

"Kamagurka." Lambiek.net. N.p., 01 Jan. 1970. Web. 14 May 2019.

Knudde, Kjell. "David Bueno De Mesquita." Lambiek.net. N.p., 01 Jan. 1970. Web. 15 May 2019.

Knudde, Kjell. "Eppo Doeve." Lambiek.net. N.p., 01 Jan. 1970. Web. 15 May 2019.

Knudde, Kjell. "Herman Brood." Lambiek.net. N.p., 01 Jan. 1970. Web. 15 May 2019.

Knudde, Kjell. "Klaus Voormann." Lambiek.net. N.p., 01 Jan. 1970. Web. 15 May 2019.

Knudde, Kjell. "Remco Campert." Lambiek.net. N.p., 01 Jan. 1970. Web. 15 May 2019.

"Maarten Gerritsen." Lambiek.net. N.p., 01 Jan. 1970. Web. 15 May 2019.

MAGNERON, Philippe. "Bedetheque - BD, Manga, Comics." BDGest RSS. N.p., n.d. Web. 14 May 2019.

"Margreet De Heer." Lambiek.net. N.p., 01 Jan. 1970. Web. 15 May 2019.

"Michel Weyland." Lambiek.net. N.p., 01 Jan. 1970. Web. 14 May 2019.

"Nestor Gonzalez Fossat." Lambiek.net. N.p., 01 Jan. 1970. Web. 14 May 2019.

"Picha." Lambiek.net. N.p., 01 Jan. 1970. Web. 14 May 2019.

"Piet Broos." Stripwinkel Lambiek. N.p., n.d. Web. 15 May 2019.

"Primaggio Mantovi." Lambiek.net. N.p., 01 Jan. 1970. Web. 14 May 2019.

"Ralf König." Lambiek.net. N.p., 01 Jan. 1970. Web. 15 May 2019.

"Raoul Servais." Lambiek.net. N.p., 01 Jan. 1970. Web. 14 May 2019.

"Ray Goossens." Lambiek.net. N.p., 01 Jan. 1970. Web. 14 May 2019.

"Raymond Bär Van Hemmersweil." Lambiek.net. N.p., 01 Jan. 1970. Web. 15 May 2019.

Schuddeboom, Bas, and Kjell Knudde. "Johnn Bakker." Lambiek.net. N.p., 01 Jan. 1970. Web. 15 May 2019.

Schuddeboom, Bas. "Andries Brandt." Lambiek.net. N.p., 01 Jan. 1970. Web. 15 May 2019.

Schuddeboom, Bas. "Ben Abas." Lambiek.net. N.p., 01 Jan. 1970. Web. 15 May 2019.

Schuddeboom, Bas. "Bert Bus." Lambiek.net. N.p., 01 Jan. 1970. Web. 15 May 2019.

Schuddeboom, Bas. "Jos Beekman." Lambiek.net. N.p., 01 Jan. 1970. Web. 15 May 2019.

Schuddeboom, Bas. "René Bergmans." Lambiek.net. N.p., 01 Jan. 1970. Web. 15 May 2019.

Schuddeboom, Bas. "Robbert Damen." Lambiek.net. N.p., 01 Jan. 1970. Web. 15 May 2019.

Schuddeboom, Bas. "Rolf Kauka." Lambiek.net. N.p., 01 Jan. 1970. Web. 15 May 2019.

Schuddeboom, Bas. "Ruben L. Oppenheimer." Lambiek.net. N.p., 01 Jan. 1970. Web. 15 May 2019.

Schuddeboom, Bas. "Wilma Van Den Bosch." Lambiek.net. N.p., 01 Jan. 1970. Web. 15 May 2019.

"Theo Funke Küpper." Lambiek.net. N.p., 01 Jan. 1970. Web. 15 May 2019.

"Ton Beek." Lambiek.net. N.p., 01 Jan. 1970. Web. 15 May 2019.

"Uco Egmond." Lambiek.net. N.p., 01 Jan. 1970. Web. 15 May 2019.

"Walter Moers." Lambiek.net. N.p., 01 Jan. 1970. Web. 15 May 2019.

"Wilhelm Busch." Lambiek.net. N.p., 01 Jan. 1970. Web. 14 May 2019.
