= Nikhil Chaudhary =

Nikhil Chaudhary may refer to:

- Nikhil Kumar Choudhary (born 1948), Indian politician
- Nikhil Chaudhary (environmentalist), Indian environmentalist, urban-planner and architect
- Nikhil Chaudhary (cricketer) (born 1996), Indian-born Australian cricketer
