= Mikael Oskarsson =

Swedish comic creator

Mikael Oskarsson is a Swedish comic creator who has worked in various genres in both fanzine and professional contexts. His semi-pornographic superhero adventure, The Exhibitionist, was published in the United States at Fantagraphics under their sub-label Eros Comix.
