= Lolo et Sucette =

Belgian comic series by Hardy and Yann

- Main characters with the series logo
- Author(s): Yann
- Illustrator(s): Marc Hardy
- Current status/schedule: Discontinued
- Launch date: 1989
- End date: 2001
- Publisher(s): Glénat, Dupuis
- Genre(s): Humor comics, Gag cartoon

Lolo et Sucette (translation: Lolo and Sucette) is a Belgian gag-a-day comics series by Marc Hardy and Yann about two prostitutes.

== Concept ==
Lolo et Sucette is a one-page gag comic about two prostitutes and the various customers they have. Lolo is an obese blonde woman, while Sucette is red-headed and slender. Both are chain smokers. In 1988 the series debuted in the Belgian magazine Circus in a magazine special about prostitution. The characters caught on and soon received their own series. The first album was published by Glénat, but in 1997 it was distributed by Dupuis in their Humour Libre collection.

== Albums ==
- Trottoirs Brûlants (1989), Glénat.
- Vénus Vénales (1997), Dupuis.
- Tapinage Artistique (1998), Dupuis.
- Coïts et Chuchotements (1999), Dupuis.
- Macadam Cochonnes (2000), Dupuis.
- Au Suivant! (2001), Dupuis.

== See also ==
• Belgian comics

• Franco-Belgian comics
