= Pieter Zandvliet =

Dutch mixed media artist

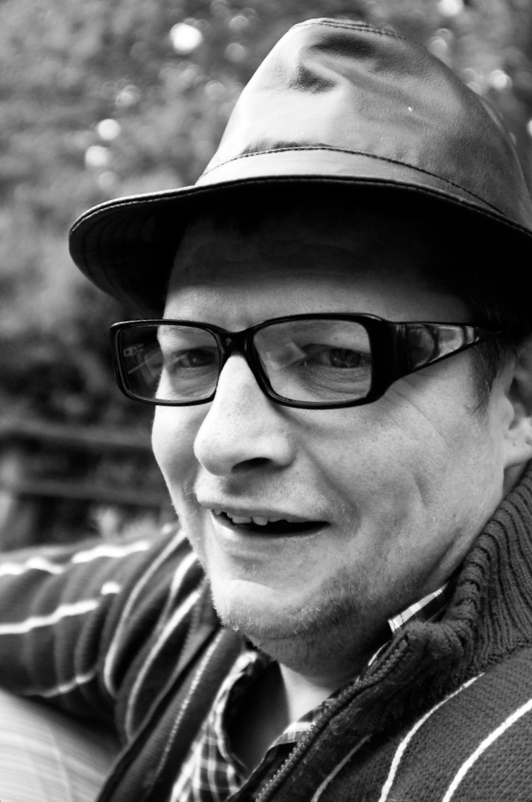
Visual artist Pieter Zandvliet

Jan Willem Pieter Zandvliet (Leiden, Netherlands, 14 April 1969) is a Dutch mixed media artist. He specialises in painting and drawing, but is also involved in writing and movie making. Typical are his comic-like painting style and his attention to his outlines.

== The artist ==
=== Childhood ===
Zandvliet grew up in the Delfshaven neighborhood of Dutch harbor city Rotterdam. During this time Delfshaven was considered to be a multicultural neighborhood, something that influenced Zandvliet a lot in his later artwork. This shows in his technique, but also in the themes he uses.

After primary school, Zandvliet attended the graphic career school (from 1983 until 1987), which wasn't a big success. In an interview he once claimed that he got into a fight with the school director and got suspended. He decided to attend the Public Academy, to specialize in model drawing and fashion. (From 1988 until 1991)

=== Freelook magazine ===
In 1992 Zandvliet started, together with his wife, Freelook magazine. This magazine was a project intended for the youth in Rotterdam's Delfshaven neighborhood. The editors of the magazine were all local youngsters. Pieter mostly was busy making comics for the magazine, but also published his own comic albums. Most of them were about Rotterdam street life. Besides this, he became editor-in-chief of the magazine.

=== Galerie Slaphanger ===
In 1994, also with his wife, Zandvliet started the gallery Galerie Slaphanger. This was a small gallery with mostly exhibitions of amateur artists. Also, this gallery became a selling point for self-published comics and music. After moving to a new building the self-published products became more important. From all over the world people sent their self-made and self-published art to Gallery Slaphanger. The gallery became a stronghold for underground music, noise, literature, art and comics. Small concerts were organised, poetry nights, lectures, exhibitions, movie nights and a festival called "het plaatendraaiersfestival" (The record player festival) where people could bring their own old records and play them for the visitors. Galerie Slaphanger stopped existing in 2003.

Artists exhibiting in the gallery were, among others: Chris Berg, Tom Oomes, Eddy de Waal, Bas van Tuyl AKA Bombastus, Marc van Elburg, Koen Hottentot, Nar=me, SAGE art, Sjef Henderickx, Itam van Teeseling, Arjen de Jong, Monique Veldhoven, Damy van der Waal, Rocket Freudenthal, Timex, Joost Geertsma, Jan Tromper, Jollen van der Zwan, Tommy de Roos, Daan van Eijndhoven, Guido Jelsma, Jason Austin, Marc Dancey, Maaike Hartjes, Barbara Stok, Anja Ranja, Wilco Wenrich, Koen Kuijpers, Claudio Parentella, Maria Colino and many others.

== The art ==
=== Melt Art ===
Zandvliet experimented a lot with different types of media. In 1994, for the first time, he had a solo exhibition in Galerie Slaphanger with his 'melt art'. These were artworks made of melted plastic (mostly Barbie dolls) melted on wood, transformed into a surreal three-dimensional painting, and finalized with aerosols.

=== Comics ===
Zandvliet started his career as a cartoonist for Freelook magazine, also he published a few comic books on his own. The theme of his cartoons mostly was the street life of Rotterdam.

=== Painting ===
Zandvliet started focussing on painting in 1998. In this year he was chosen by curator Koos van Duinen to take part in the art show 'De Dubbelkamer', in Schiedam. There he won the audience award and the encouragement award for young artists. He sold five of the nine exposed paintings.

In 1999 Zandvliet participated in a group exhibition called 'je weet niet wat je ziet' (you don't know what you are seeing), in the Municipal Museum of Schiedam. Here he made a mural and exposed a movie in which he plays himself as a painting freak. In 2001 Zandvliet painted, in commission of Julia Snikkers (formal director of the Artoteek Schiedam) a roll-down shutter and connected an exhibition to it in the Artoteek (a place where people can rent art).

In the same year he painted a mural in Pand Paulus, an exhibition hall in Schiedam. And in 2004 mayor Scheeres of Schiedam opened the exhibition 'Salsa and Tulips'. This was a duo exhibition together with Texan artist Joan Fabian. After this Zandvliet began orientating more internationally and did exhibitions in Spain, the USA, Poland, Italy, Thailand, Iran, Russia, Portugal and Venezuela.

==== Method ====
Zandvliet puts his outlines directly on the canvas, or paper. He doesn't sketch out his idea, but likes to make his work like a journey. He never knows how the final work will turn out. Lines are important to him. With the lines, he expresses the feeling in the figure that he draws. The colors he uses are psychedelic and contrasting.

The last exhibition in Schiedam, for he left for Overijssel in late 2008, was the exhibition ' conflict ', in which the two artists entered into a duel on canvas. Zandvliet did this with the Icelandic artist Didrik Jon Kristofersson. In 2006, Zandvliet together with Frank van der Donk and Ivanna Urbanova Whale Art shop in the Centre of Schiedam set up, for which he also designed the logo. In 2011, he participated in the Twente Biennale Hengelo and he exhibited in the art house Secretary in Meppel, the Netherlands. One of the two other artists who exhibited there was the equally from the Randstad moved Rene Virgin mountain. The two artists have made multiple works together under the name Piers eaters. In 2012 Zandvliet's art hung on the wall of the exhibition Lecheria Pop Art in the Museo Museo Dimitrios Demu Venezuela. Zandvliet exhibited in 2013 in La sala Tarragona Catalonia, Spain to Amposta. In 2014, he painted shoes Mascolori shoes in Command of Rotterdam. He designed the logo of the beach fashion clothing label Viva Lola from Miami. 2015 he Exposseerde in the Outsider Art Gallery Amsterdam and he participated in Emerged an exhibit with contemporary Dutch Pop art artists in the Zandvoorts museum. 2016 came to Mascolori the Outline shoe from designed by Pieter Zanvliet and three pairs of stockings. He also designed the cover of Bacon Fat louis, and he released his own shirt label FACE Clothes. 2017 came a shoe out of Pieter zandvliet at Mascolori, the Pieter zandvliet in a small print run of 50 pairs. and the Football shoe designed by z. For The SOTU to festival of Amsterdam zandvliet designed shirts. For the Amsterdam-based Brewer Butchers tears, he designed a label. By the Agentijnse filmmakers Flor Scarano and Cecilia Garizoain work is ongoing on the docemantaire,"Maybe I should draw"" about zandvliet aimed at film festivals. 2018, Zandvliet's third shoe came out for Mascolori, which is called Pieter Zandvliet. Hard art was an exhibition with work by friends Hein Dingemans and Pieter Zandvliet in Atelier / gallery Herenplaats in Rotterdam. For an exhibition about the Settlers in the former Ommerschans Colony, Pieter made portraits of old black and white photos of Settlers who were exposed at the sculpture garden Witharen in Witharen, where they will also be on display in 2019. In the Cult gallery in Raalte, Pieter exhibited a series of portraits made by the Raaltener artist Bram de Krosse and Zandvliet. Clothing brand Wolff Blitz brought a shirt on the market with a print by Pieter Zandvliet.

2019 this year did not start pleasantly with the death of friend Bram de Krosse, who was only 33 years old. A fourth shoe designed for Mascolori, the Pieter Zandvliet 2.0, was released. With the Teekenclub a group of artist friends, Zandvliet painted the Bar wall of his neighbor Rolf Dunnink. Pieter Zandvliet exhibits his work in the Grote Kerk of Dalfsen on 4 and 5 May during Art around Dalfsen
