= Yusuf Lien =

Yusuf Lien also known as Yusuf Bangalorewala is an Indian book illustrator best known for his work on the Amar Chitra Katha comic book series, which deals with subjects from Indian myth, legend, and history. His dream-like sensual work on the titles Tansen and Mirabai is admired by many who believe he had one of the most distinctive styles among the Amar Chitra Katha artists. According to researcher John Stratton Hawley, the Amar Chitra Katha staff took a 'nonsectarian pride' that the exquisite depictions of Krishna in Mirabai were the work of a Muslim artist, who as his editor Anant Pai described it, would be in tears as he drew his frames for the comic book. Yusuf also painted the image of the child Krishna seen on the cover of the comic book of the same name.

Yusuf eventually gave up drawing comics, considering the work 'haraam' and took up calligraphy. He later told Nandini Chandra, author of The Classic Popular: Amar Chitra Katha, 1967-2007 that he found the series' depictions of Muslims problematic.
