= Angeles Felices Lancina =

Spanish cartoonist and illustrator

Angeles Felices Lancina is a Spanish cartoonist and illustrator. She started as a comic as a teenager in Zaragoza and studied at the School of Arts and Crafts and then with painter Alejandro Canada at the academy. In 1975, she moved to Barcelona where she started to collaborate with the Dutch magazine Tina to publish her work. Her work appeared in Tina from the 1980s until the late 2000s. Her work also appeared in the UK magazine Tammy. In Spain, her work appeared in the magazine Jana and she was also an illustrator of the Spanish editions of the “Dana Girls” mystery novels. Her work was exhibited in a dedicated exhibit in Spain by the Salón del Cómic de Zaragoza at the Joaquín Roncal Center called “Happy Angels, comic book artist”.

She was the winner of the 2017 Aragonese Comic Grand Prize.

She is married to the Spanish painter Hermogenes Pardos.
