= Églantine Chesneau =

French cartoonist and illustrator (born 1982)

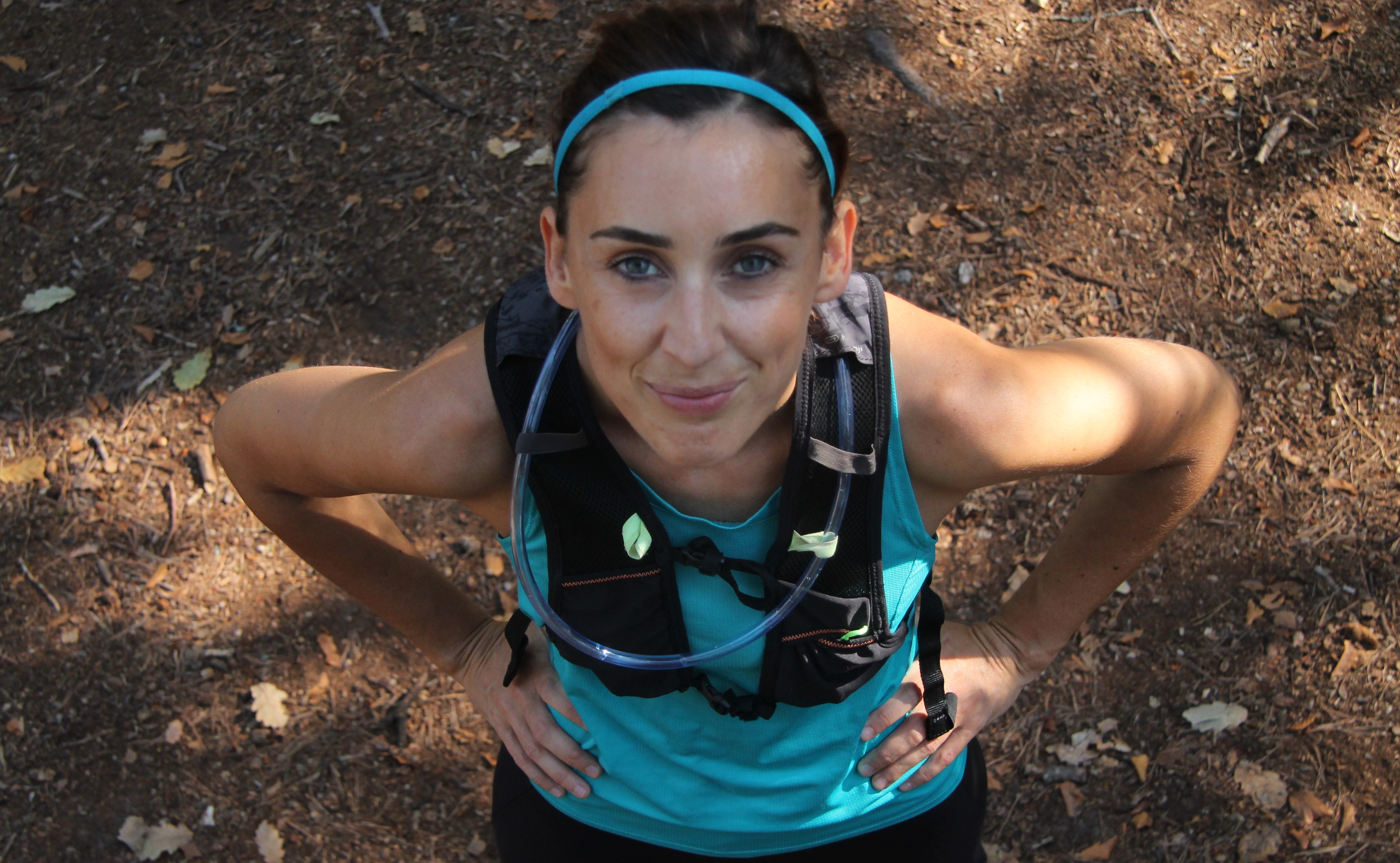
- Shown in 2020
- Born: 1982 (age 43–44)
- Education: Rueil-Malmaison School of Fine Arts
- Writing career
- Language: French
- Genre: bande dessinée

Églantine Chesneau is a French cartoonist and illustrator.

== Biography ==
Églantine Chesneau studied at the Rueil-Malmaison School of Fine Arts. Around 2014 to 2015, she worked as a cartoonist for Le Nouvel Observateur.

In 2019, Michel Lafon published her first bande dessinée, 12 301 jours avec ma mamie (12 301 days with my granny). where she describes the end of her grandmother's life.

Also in 2019, she ran in the Paris Marathon, which serves as the inspiration for a comic strip describing her preparation for the event, finally released as an album in 2021. The cartoon was being written concurrently as she prepared for the marathon. During her preparation, she met a dozen other amateur athletes who also running their first marathon; these meetings served as her inspiration when writing the comic. Her album has gained popularity France and Belgium.

== Publications ==
- 12 301 jours avec ma mamie, Michel Lafon, 2019 ISBN 978-2-7499-3866-0.
- Alors on court : chroniques d'un premier marathon, Michel Lafon, 2021 ISBN 9782749945736.
