= Sylvain Frécon =

French comics artist (born 1972)

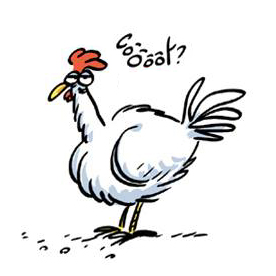
Sylvain Frécon

Sylvain Frécon (born 1972 in Bourges) is a French colorist and cartoonist.
