= Nikhil Chaudhary (environmentalist) =

Indian environmentalist and cartoonist

Nikhil Chaudhary is an environmentalist, urban-planner, architect, and cartoonist from Maharashtra, India.

== Works ==
His work has been featured as contributing to a growing movement to use comics as advocacy tools for environmental and urban issues. He is a contributing author to the recent book, Longform: An Anthology of Graphic Narratives. Most recently, his work was featured in the documentary-series, Compass by the TRT World - on an episode investigating the role of art and artists addressing Gentrification.
