= Urhunden Prizes =

Swedish comics award

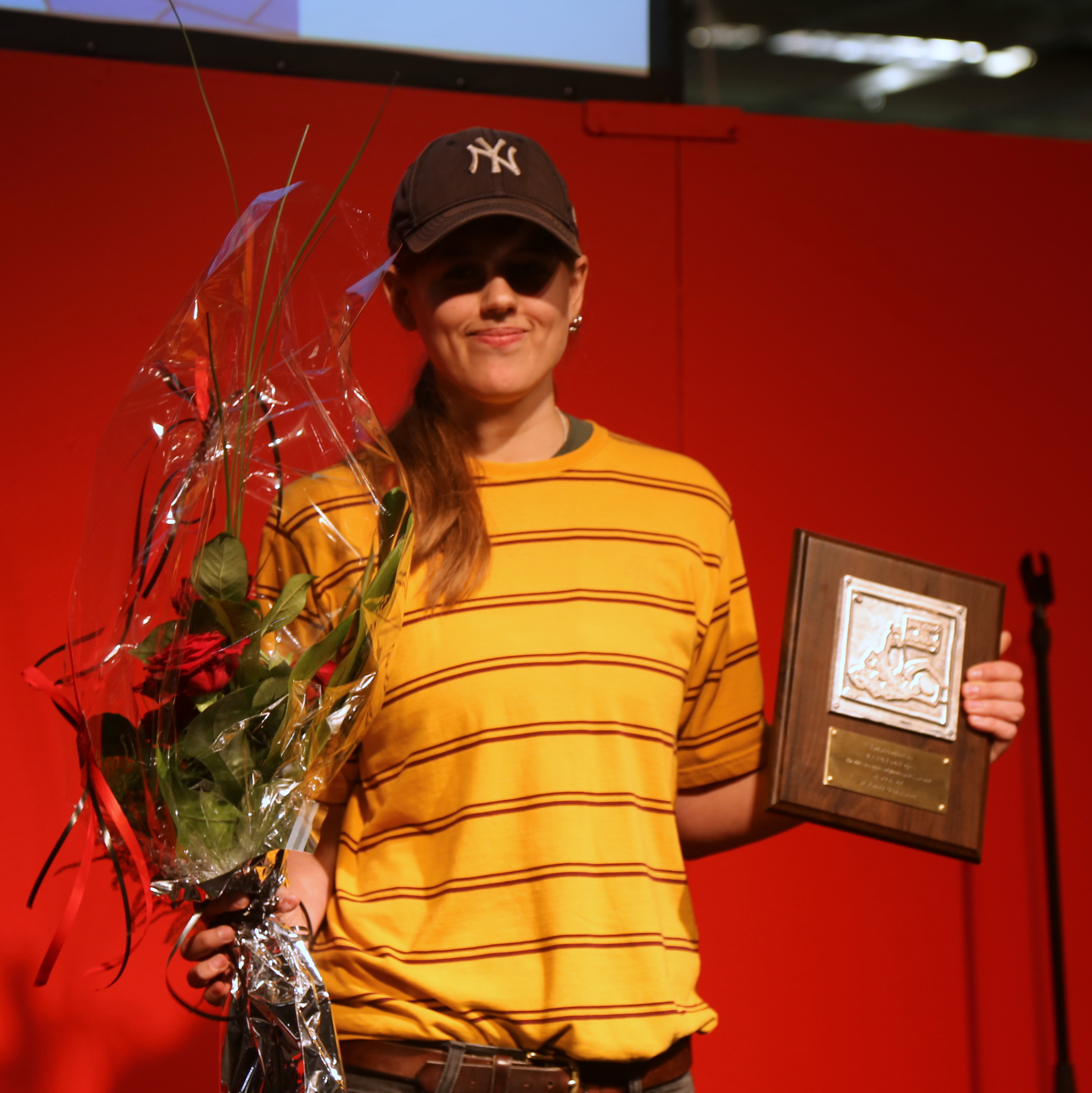
- Hanna Gustavsson receiving the Urhunden Prize at the Gothenburg Book Fair 2014.
- Awarded for: Achievements in comics
- Country: Sweden
- Presented by: The Swedish Comics Association
- First award: 1987
- Website: serieframjandet.se/urhunden/

Urhunden Prizes are awarded by The Swedish Comics Association annually since 1987 to the previous year's best original Swedish and Swedish translated comic book. The prizes are named after a classic Swedish comic book character, Urhunden ("The Doggosaurus"), from around 1900 by Oskar Andersson, one of the pioneers in Swedish comics.

The prize was partly designed in relation to the existing Adamson Awards, which is a general award of merit to a foreign and a Swedish cartoonist. The Swedish Comics Association prize, on the other hand, is linked to a specific book publication.

Between 1994 and 2018, the prize was also awarded in a third category, called Unghunden ("The Young Dog"). The prize went to someone or some people who made contributions to children's and youth comics in Sweden, without connection to any particular achievement in a particular year.

In 2022 and 2023, the awarding of the prize was suspended, while the jury reviewed the rules. In 2024, jury work and the awarding of the prize officially restarted.

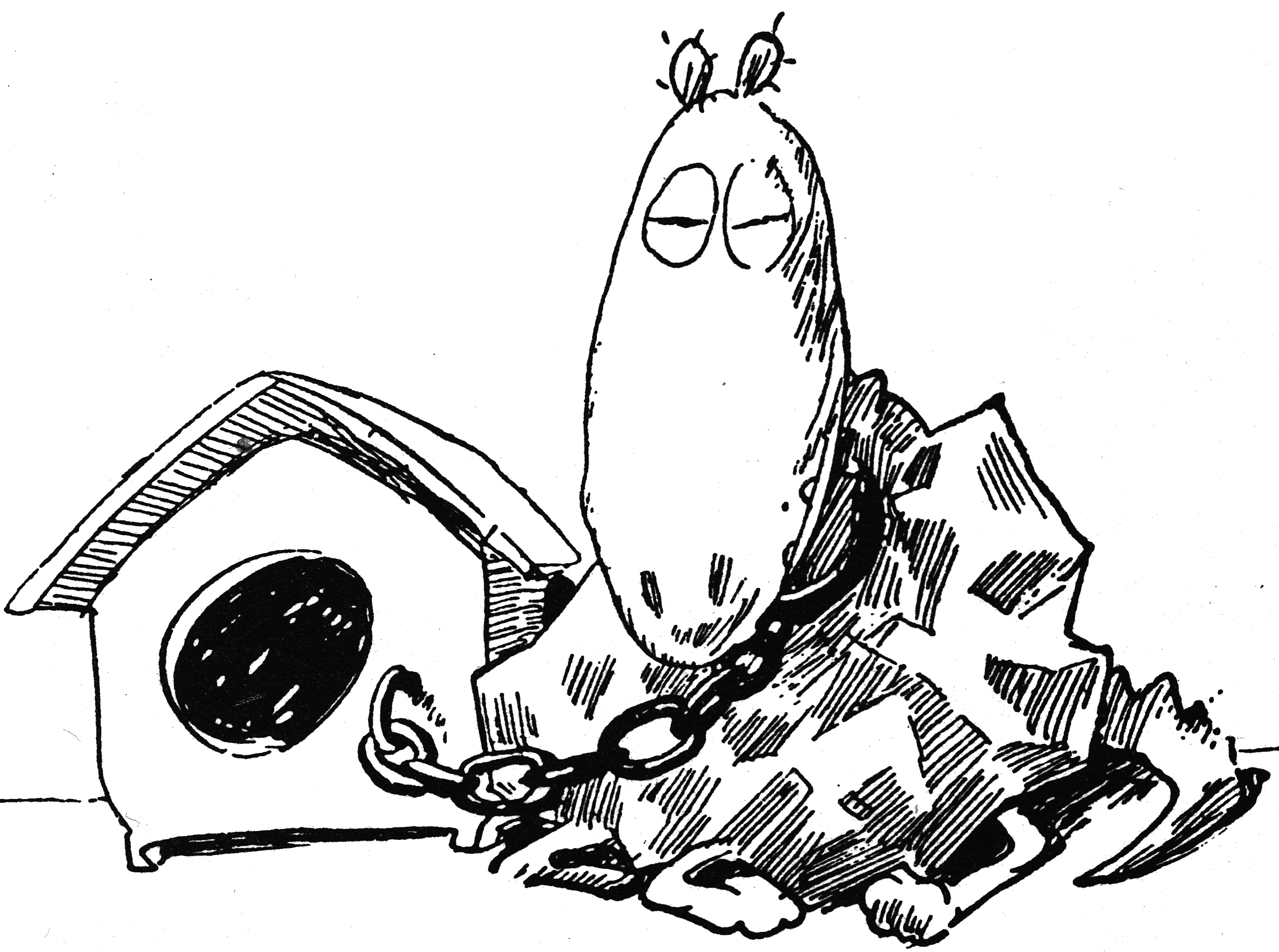
Ending panel in the comic strip The Doggosaurus' vacation by Oskar Andersson

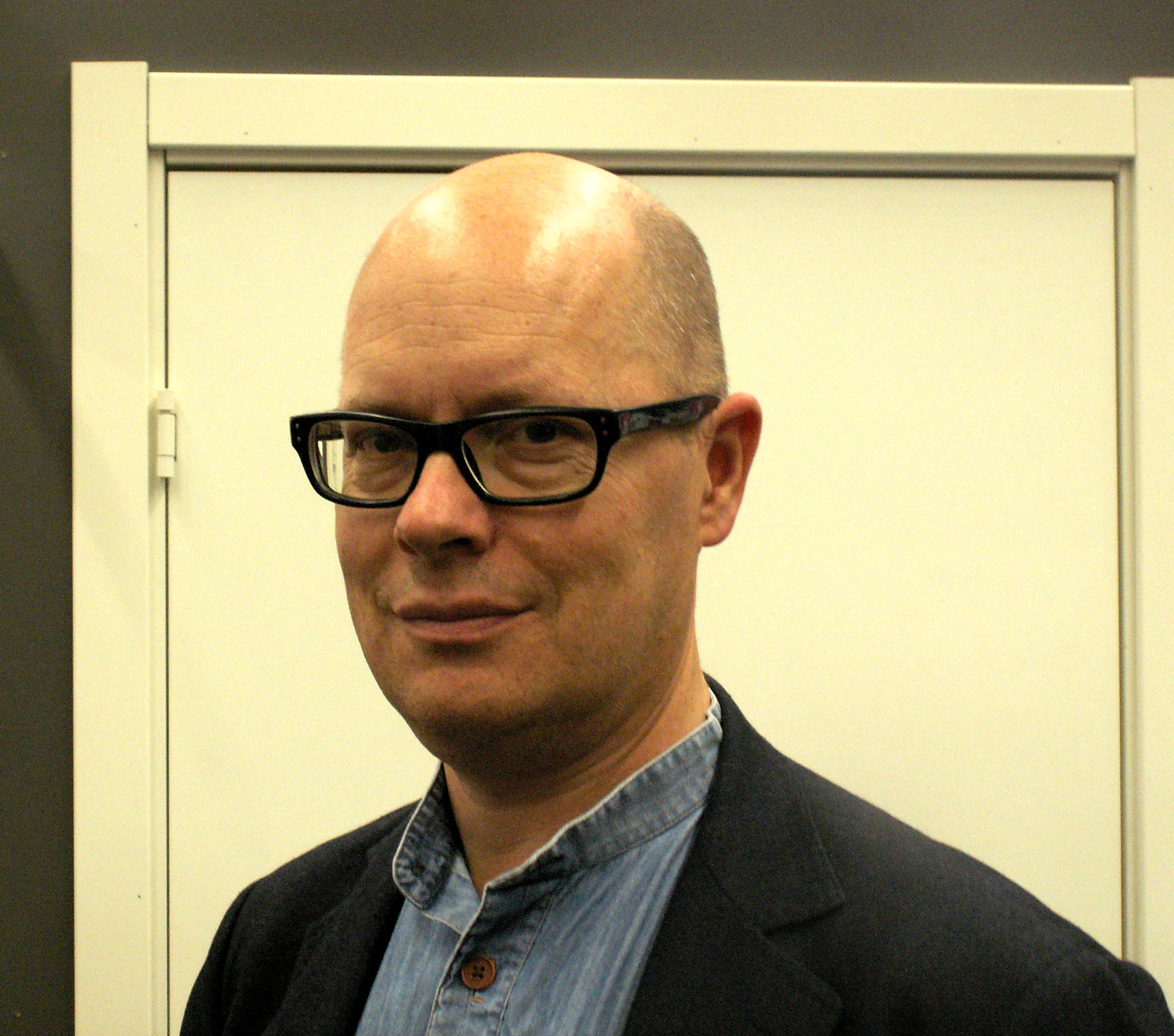
Gunnar Krantz

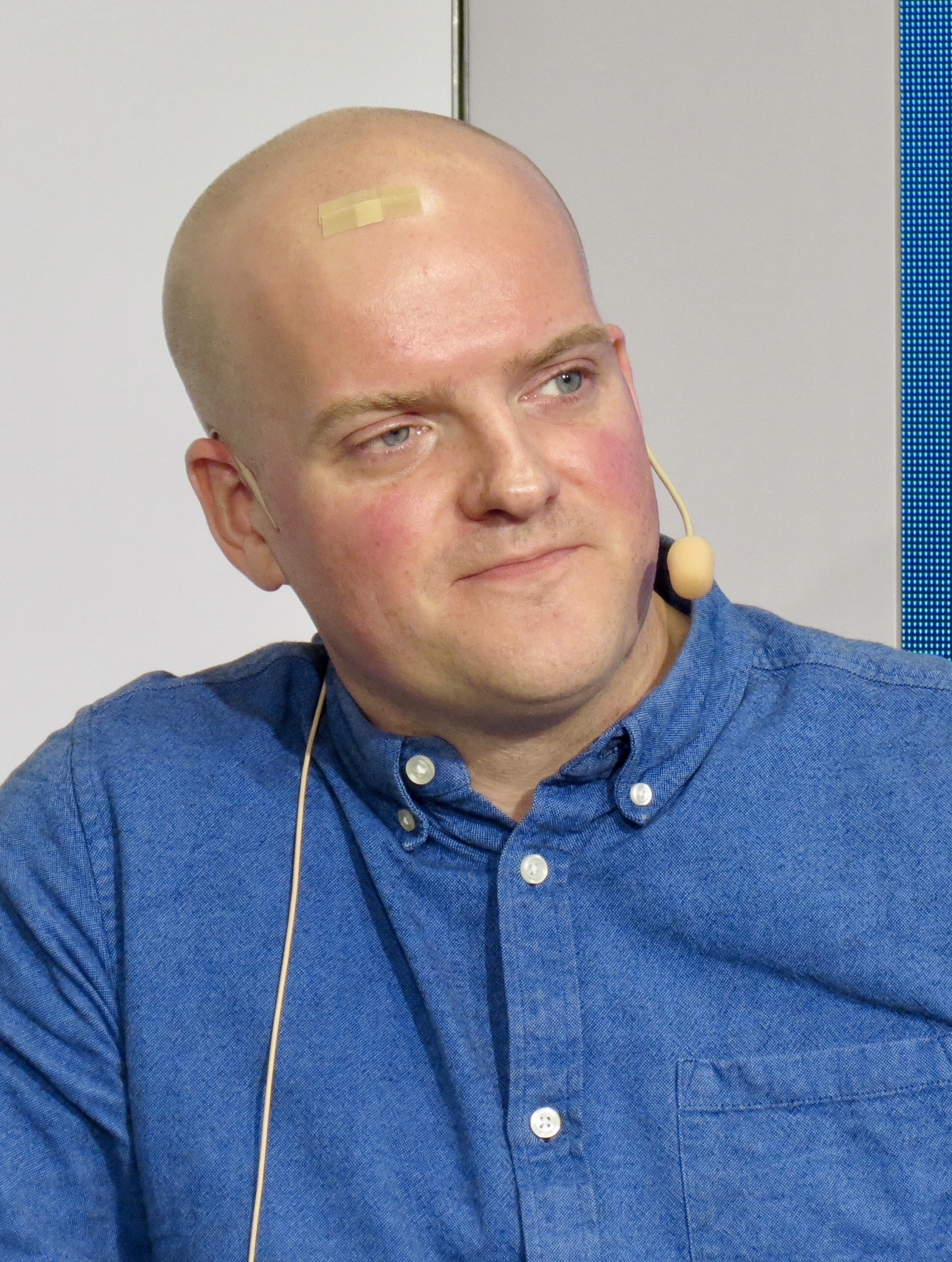
Henrik Bromander

== Best Swedish-language Comic ==
- 1987: Alger by Gunnar Krantz
- 1988: Gas by Joakim Pirinen
- 1989: Ensamma Mamman by Cecilia Torudd
- 1990: Arne Anka by Charlie Christensen
- 1991: Medan Kaffet Kallnar by Ulf Lundkvist
- 1992: Arne Anka Del II by Charlie Christensen
- 1993: Uti vår hage 3 by Krister Petersson
- 1994: Arne Anka Del III by Charlie Christensen
- 1995: Vakuumneger by Max Andersson
- 1996: Garagedrömmar by Mats Kjellblad
- 1997: Baron Bosse Story (Assar 6) by Ulf Lundkvist
- 1998: Hjärteblod by Anders Westerberg
- 1999: Allt för Konsten (anthology)
- 2000: Rocky by Martin Kellerman
- 2001: För Fin för Denna Världen by Daniel Ahlgren
- 2002: Fröken Märkvärdig och Karriären by Joanna Rubin Dranger
- 2003: Sjunde Våningen by Åsa Grennvall
- 2004: Klas Katt Går till Sjöss by Gunnar Lundkvist
- 2005: Amatörernas Afton by Anneli Furmark
- 2006: Pojken i skogen by Mats Jonsson
- 2007: Jag är din flickvän nu by Nina Hemmingsson
- 2008: Jamen förlåt då by Anneli Furmark
- 2009: Döda paret och deras ‘vänner’ by Joakim Pirinen
- 2010: Frances 1 by Joanna Hellgren
- 2011: Om någon vrålar i skogen by Malin Biller
- 2012: Vi håller på med en viktig grej by Sara Hansson
- 2013: Smålands mörker by Henrik Bromander
- 2014: Nattbarn by Hanna Gustavsson
- 2015: Det som händer i skogen by Hilda-Maria Sandgren
- 2016: Den röda vintern by Anneli Furmark
- 2017: Jag håller tiden by Åsa Grennvall
- 2018: Athena: pappas flicka by Li Österberg
- 2019: Vei - book 2 by Sara Bergmark Elfgren and Karl Johnsson
- 2020: Gå med mig till hörnet by Anneli Furmark
- 2021: No prize was awarded.
- 2022: No prize was awarded.
- 2023: Den naturliga komedin by Ulla Donner (Finland)
- 2024: Mjölk och människor by Matilda Josephson
- 2025: Vit Volvo by Erik Svetoft

== Best Comic in Swedish Translation ==
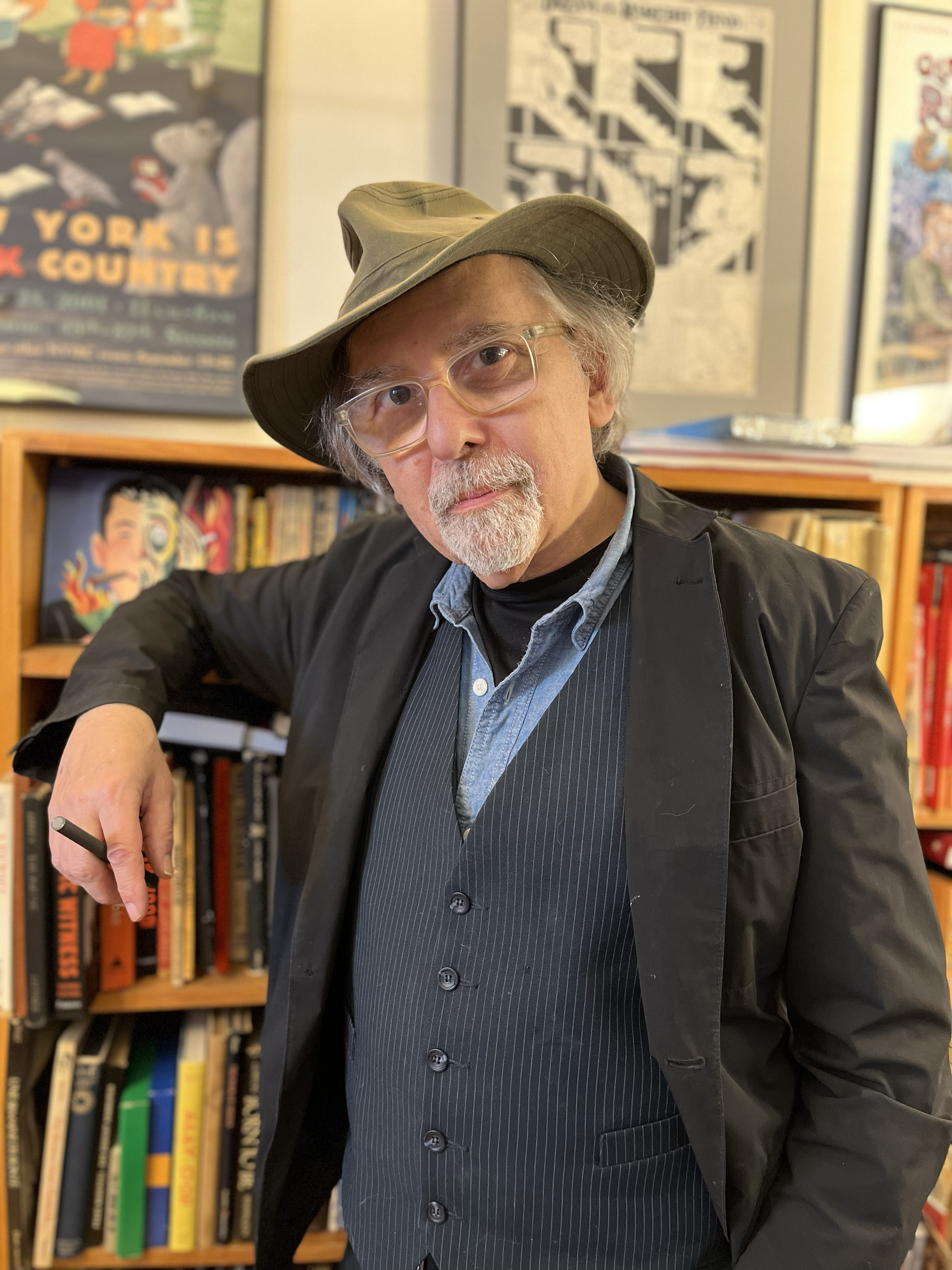
Art Spiegelman

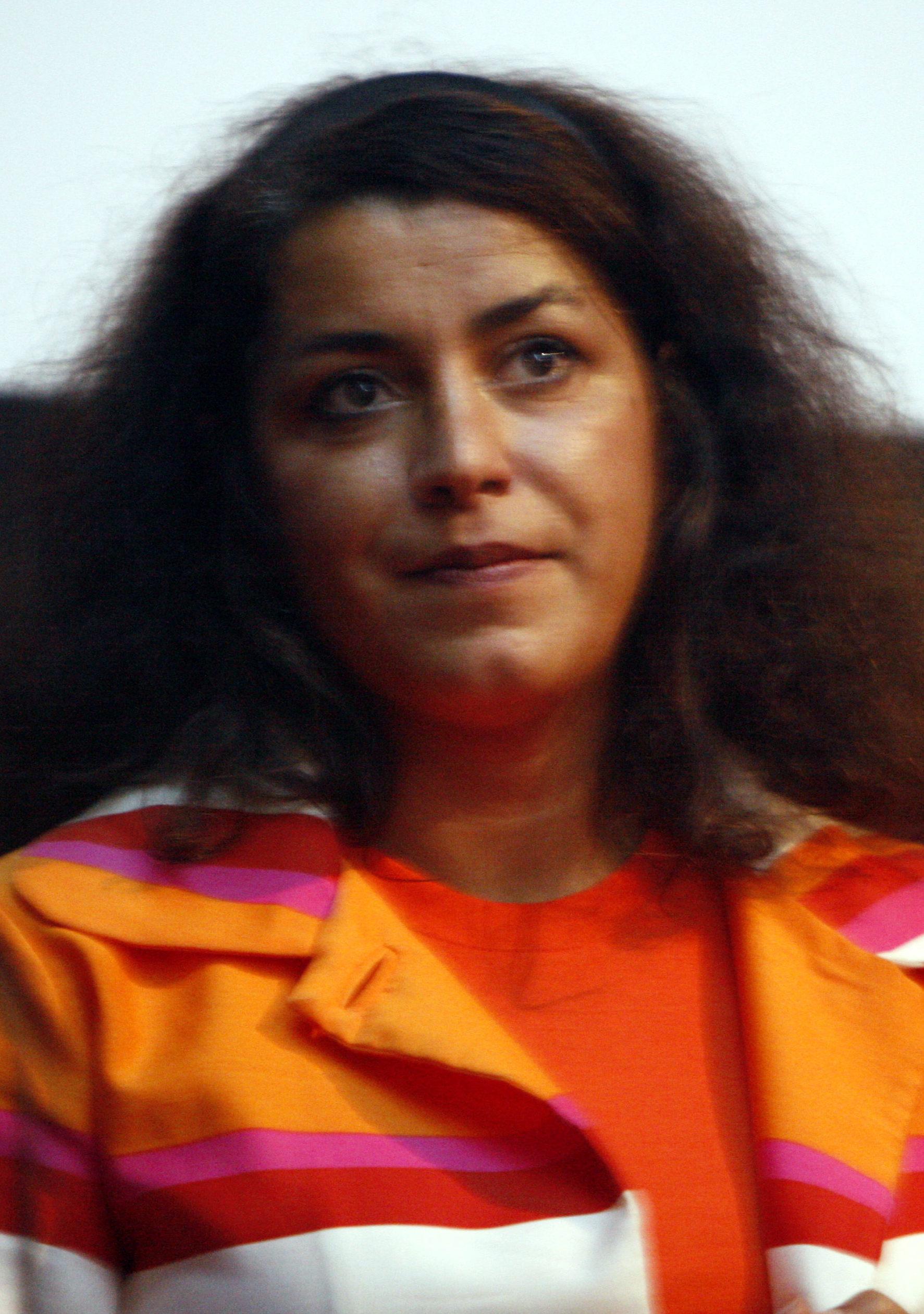
Marjane Satrapi

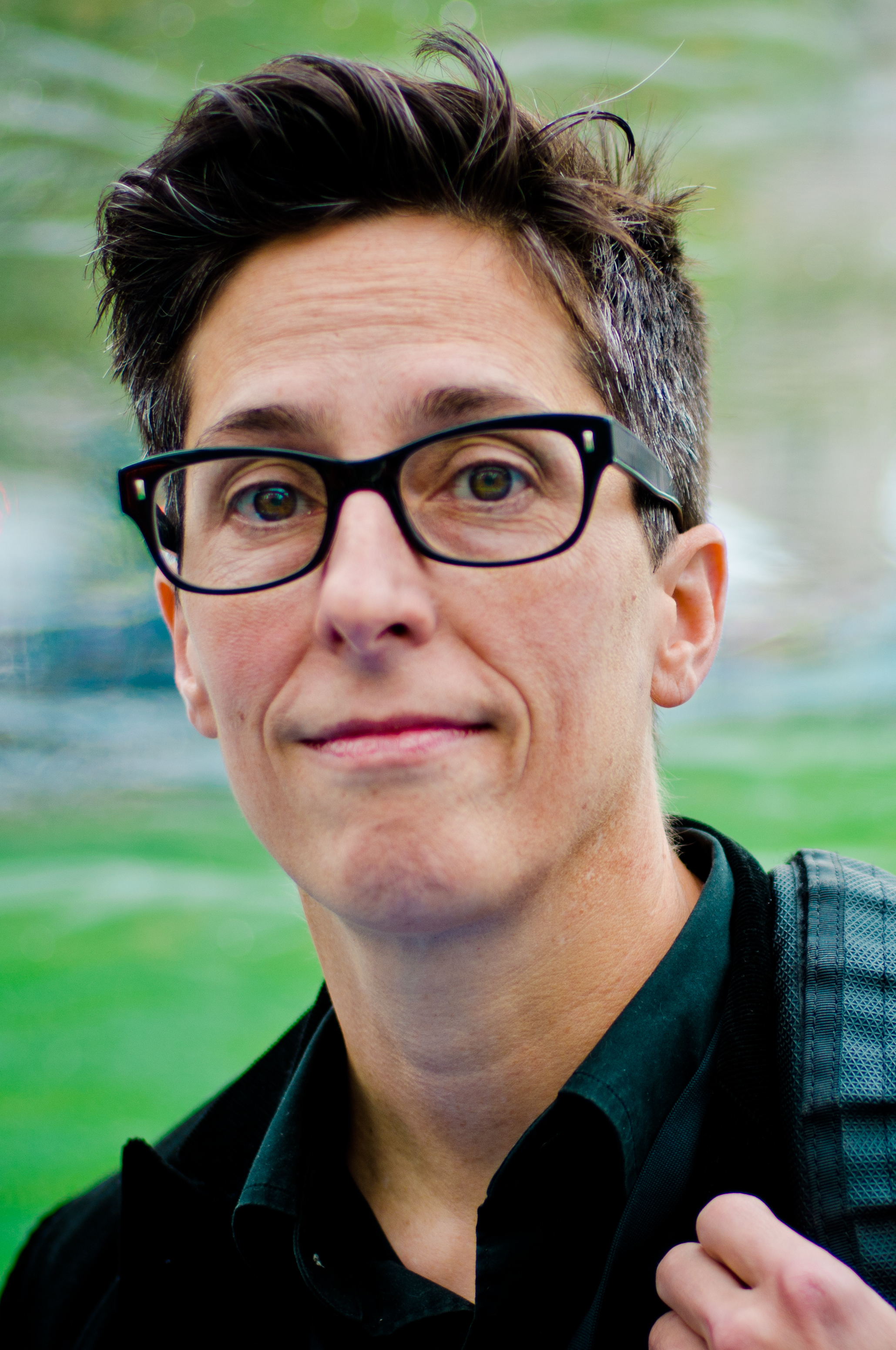
Alison Bechdel

- 1987: Operation Istanbul (La Porta d'Oriente) by Vittorio Giardino (Italy)
- 1988: Maus by Art Spiegelman (USA)
- 1989: Den Skrattande Solen (The Laughing Sun, Love and Rockets) by Gilbert Hernandez (USA)
- 1990: Blues i Brallan (Quéquette Blues) by Baru (France)
- 1991: Sirenens Sång (Le Dernier Chant des Malaterre) by François Bourgeon (France)
- 1992: Watchmen by Alan Moore and Dave Gibbons (USA)
- 1993: Maus II by Art Spiegelman (USA)
- 1994: Ernie 1 by Bud Grace (USA)
- 1995: 1945 (När Kriget Kom 5) by Niels Roland, Morten Hesseldahl and Henrik Rehr (Denmark)
- 1996: Serier: Den Osynliga Konsten (Comics: The Unseen Art) by Scott McCloud (USA)
- 1997: Den Stora Kokapplöpningen (Bone 4) by Jeff Smith (USA)
- 1998: Karu Cell by Kati Kovács (Finland)
- 1999: Ed the Happy Clown by Chester Brown (Canada)
- 2000: Pappas Flicka (Daddy's Girl) by Debbie Drechsler (USA)
- 2001: Vänta Lite... (Hey, Wait...) by Jason (Norway)
- 2002: Holmenkollen by Matti Hagelberg (Finland)
- 2003: Ghost World by Daniel Clowes (USA)
- 2004: Allt för konsten 4 (Nordic anthology)
- 2005: Persepolis Book 1 by Marjane Satrapi (Iran/France)
- 2006: V for Vendetta by Alan Moore and David Lloyd (UK/USA)
- 2007: Broderier (Broderies) by Marjane Satrapi (Iran/France)
- 2008: Olaf G. by Lars Fiske och Steffen Kverneland (Norway)
- 2009: Fixaren (The Fixer) by Joe Sacco (Malta/USA)
- 2010: Husfrid (Fun Home) by Alison Bechdel (USA)
- 2011: Ankomsten (The Arrival) by Shaun Tan (Australia)
- 2012: Tamara Drewe (Tamara Drewe) by Posy Simmonds (UK)
- 2013: Idag är sista dagen på resten av ditt liv (Today is the Last Day of the Rest of Your Life) by Ulli Lust (Austria)
- 2014: Pyongyang (Pyongyang: A Journey in North Korea) by Guy Delisle (Canada)
- 2015: Skyttegravskriget: 1914–1918 (It Was the War of the Trenches) by Jacques Tardi (France)
- 2016: Epileptisk (Epileptic) by David B. (France)
- 2017: Egendomen (The Property) by Rutu Modan (Israel)
- 2018: Framtidens arab 3: en barndom i Mellanöstern (1985–1987) (The Arab of the Future) by Riad Sattouf (France)
- 2019: Heimat: ett tyskt släktalbum (Belonging) by Nora Krug (Germany/USA)
- 2020: Survilo by Olga Lavrentieva (Russia)
- 2021: No prize was awarded.
- 2022: No prize was awarded.
- 2023: Hur jag försökte bli en god människa (How I Tried to Be a Good Person) by Ulli Lust (Austria)
- 2024: Uppvaknanden by Juliette Mancini (France)
- 2025: Modersmjölk (Milky Way) by Miguel Vila (Italy)

== Unghunden (youth comics award) ==
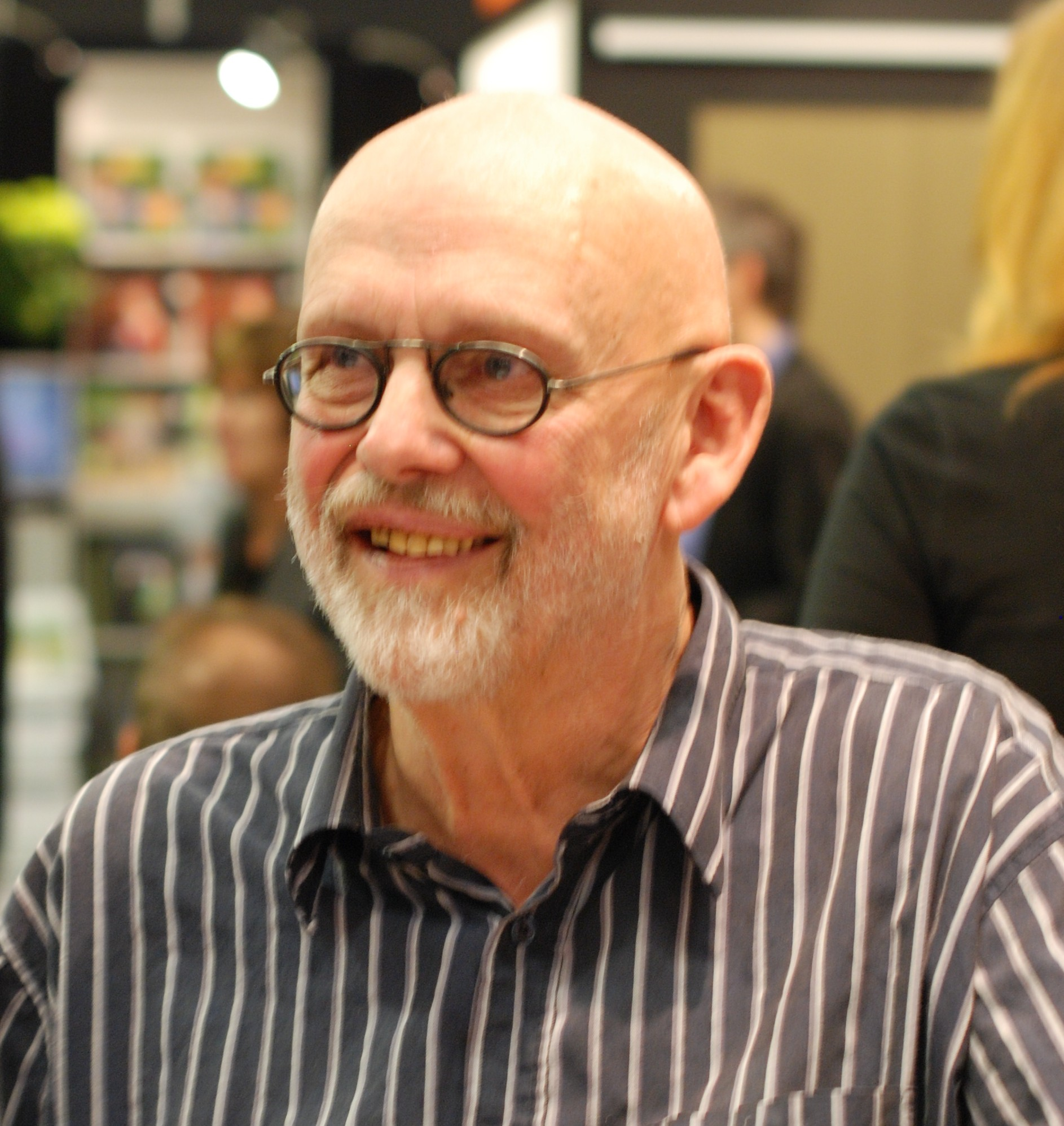
Jan Lööf

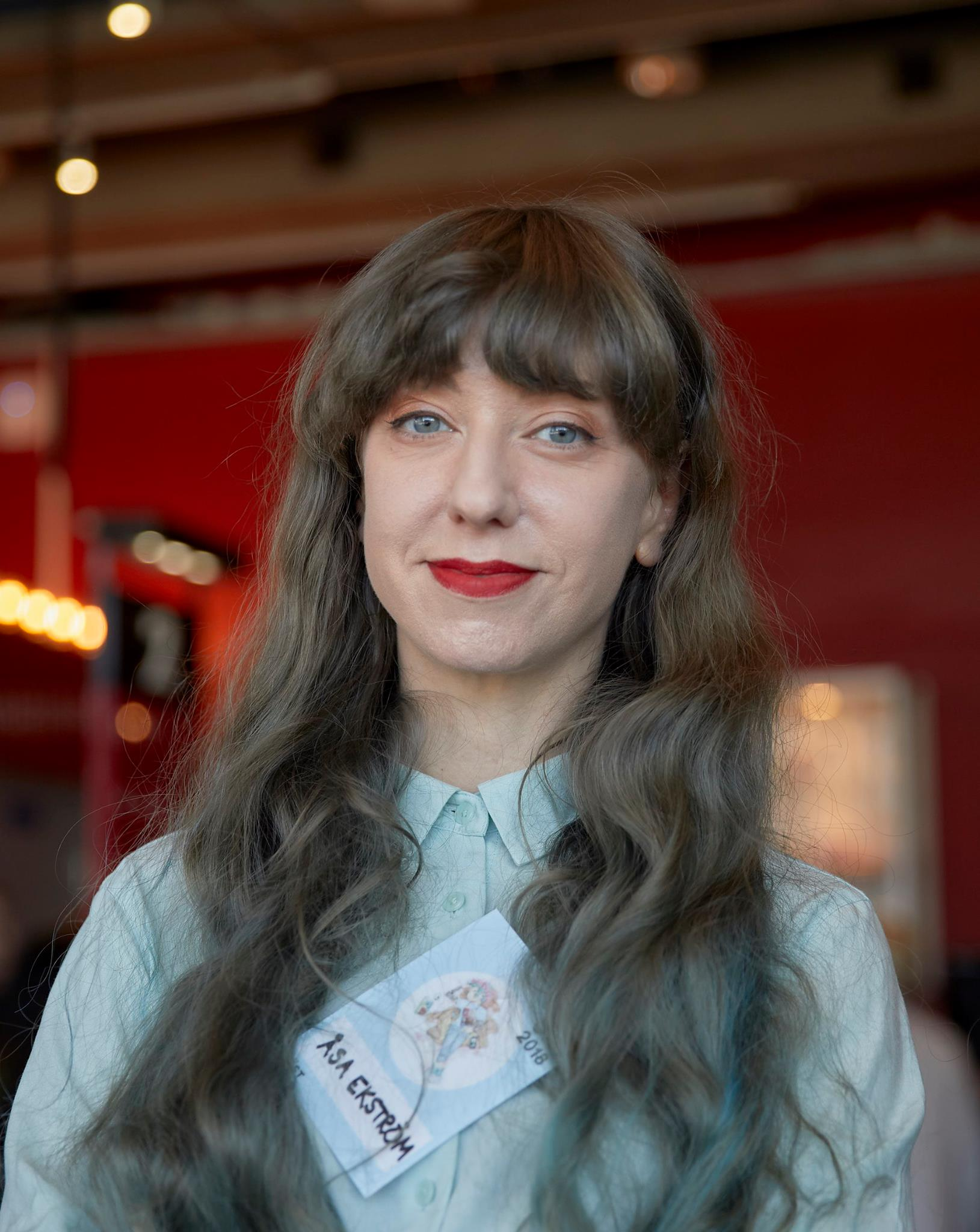
Åsa Ekström

- 1994: Rune Andréasson
- 1995: Peter Madsen, Henning Kure, Per Vadmand and Hans Rancke-Madsen
- 1996: Måns Gahrton and Johan Unenge
- 1997: Magnus Knutsson
- 1998: Don Rosa
- 1999: Bryan Talbot
- 2000: Bokfabriken
- 2001: Carlsen Comics
- 2002: Mats Källblad
- 2003: Kamratposten
- 2004: Bamse editors
- 2005: Johan Andreasson
- 2006: Helena Magnusson
- 2007: Ulf Granberg
- 2009: Jan Lööf
- 2010: Stefan Diös
- 2011: Positiv förlag
- 2012: Janne Lundström
- 2013: Johanna Kristiansson and Joakim Gunnarsson
- 2014: Åsa Ekström
- 2015: Claes Reimerthi
- 2016: Serien och eleven by Melinda Galaczy and Helga Boström
- 2017: Fabian Göranson and Josefin Svenske
- 2018: Cecilia Torudd

== See also ==
- Adamson Award (another Swedish comic book award)
