= Dai Darell =

Swedish-American comic writer and novelist (1952 – 2024)

- Diane Alfredhsson Karlstrom
- Born: Diane Elizabeth; October 5, 1952; Rockford, Illinois, U.S.
- Died: July 7, 2024 (aged 72); Leduc, Alberta, Canada
- Citizenship: United States, Sweden
- Occupations: Comic writer and young adult novelist
- Spouse(s): Arne Alfredhsson; Michael Karlstrom (2003-2021 his death)
- Children: 3
- Writing career
- Pen name: Saga Borg, Teo Troy
- Notable work: The Phantom

Diane Elizabeth Karlstrom, pen name Dai Darell (October 5, 1952 – July 8, 2024) was a Swedish-American comic writer and young adult novelist.

== Biography ==
Darell was born in Rockford, Illinois, and grew up both in the United States and in Sweden. As a teenager, she was an avid reader of the Swedish comic book Fantomen, dedicated to the comic strip "The Phantom". After writing to the editors, she was encouraged to submit a script. Her first published Phantom story was published in 1983 and she became the first female Fantomen writer. It was then she adopted the pen name Dai Darell. She would write for The Phantom until 1986, contributing 16 stories.

In 1984, she met Swedish comic writer Claes Reimerthi at the Seriefrämjandet, the Swedish Comics Society and encouraged him to begin writing Phantom stories. Reimerthi would go on to make a significant impact on The Phantom.

From 1983 to 1986 Darell wrote the series "Gauntlet of Fate", originally a British comic. She would contribute to a number of comic and magazine publications, including Starlet, Min Häst, "Tom & Jerry", Wendy, "Pellefant" as well as several Disney comics.

=== Young adult writing ===
In 1997, Darell connected with Swedish writer Carola Haglund with whom she would have a longtime writing collaboration. Together they would write a number of series set in pre-Viking Scandinavia, as well as a series for young girls interested in horses, "Stall Silverlyckan".

In 2003, Darell moved to Canada with her husband Michael Karlstrom. There, she continued to write young adult novels under various names, including Diane Karlstrom, Saga Borg and Teo Troy. Many of her young adult novels and series featured equestrian themes.

=== Return to The Phantom and later life ===
In 2019, Darell returned to write two stories for The Phantom alongside Magnus Carling. Her last two stories for The Phantom appeared in 2019.

Darell died on July 7, 2024, in Canada.

== Bibliography ==
=== Comics ===
- "The Phantom"
- "Gauntlet of Fate"

=== Novels ===
Written as Diane Karlstrom

- Zero Tolerance, 2010. ISBN 978-1934983515
- Keine Nachsicht, 2010 ISBN 978-3940455703
- Auf Wiedersehen, Trockadero, 2013 ISBN 978-3941443921

==== Stable Silverlyckan "Stall Silverlyckan" Series ====
Written with Carola Haglund.

- Annelies önskedröm, 2002
- Farväl Rufus, 2003
- Rädda Rackarns Fridolf, 2003
- Vilsna vänner, 2003
- Stallets busigaste häst
- Upp i sadeln igen!

==== Jarastavens vandring Series ====
Written with Carola Haglund and Jesper Svensson under the name Saga Borg.

- Völvans dotter. Malmö : Richter, 2000. ISBN 91-7709-199-X
- Ondskans tecken. Malmö : Richter, 2000. ISBN 91-7709-200-7
- Vindens öga. Malmö : Richter, 2001. ISBN 91-7709-201-5
- Urlas skugga. Malmö : Richter, 2002. ISBN 91-7711-355-1
- Mörkrets makter. Malmö : Richter, 2003. ISBN 91-7715-295-6
- Dödens vingslag. Malmö : Richter, 2004. ISBN 91-7711-131-1
- Livets källa. Malmö : Damm, 2005. ISBN 91-7130-315-4
- Vargens lya. Malmö : Damm, 2006. ISBN 91-7130-675-7
- Tertors vrede. Malmö : Damm, 2008. ISBN 978-91-7715-401-3

==== Blodsbröder Series ====
Written with Carola Haglund and Jesper Svensson under the name Saga Borg.

- Tiggarens förbannelse. Stockholm : Schibsted, 2006. ISBN 91-7713-275-0
- Den mörka hemligheten. Stockholm : Schibsted, 2006. ISBN 91-7713-276-9
- Brödraskapet. Stockholm : Schibsted, 2006. ISBN 978-91-7713-277-6
- Finnvedens Orakel. Stockholm : Schibsted, 2007. ISBN 978-91-7713-278-3
- Änglamakerskan. Stockholm : Schibsted, 2007. ISBN 978-91-7713-279-0
- Liemannen. Stockholm : Schibsted, 2007. ISBN 978-91-7713-280-6
- Skärselden. Stockholm : Schibsted, 2008. ISBN 978-91-7713-281-3
- Den sjunde duvan. Stockholm : Schibsted, 2008. ISBN 978-91-7713-282-0

==== Den svarta kristallen Series ====
Written with Carola Haglund and Jesper Svensson under the name Teo Troy.

- Landet bortom, 2001
- Fruktansvärdet, 2001, ISBN 9789132142789
- Kristallens kraft, 2001
- Pantaurernas halvö, 2001
- I Fördärvets våld, 2002, ISBN 9789132143649
- Eldhäxans gåva, 2002, ISBN 9789132143656
- Spegelsalen, 2003
- Hedins valv, 2003

==== John Romeo Series ====
With Magnus Carling.

- The Artist (Konstnären), 2017
- Crucified (Korsfäst), 2017
- Dahlia's Wheel (Dahlias hjul), 2022
