= Ensamma mamman =

Swedish comic strip created by Cecilia Torudd

Ensamma mamman ("single mom") is a Swedish comic strip created by Cecilia Torudd. Ensamma mamman first made a brief appearance in Dagens Nyheter in 1985. It was well received by the readers and returned in 1987 as a fixed feature. Torudd continued drawing it until 1991, when it was syndicated by Bull, and it has since been rerun in many newspapers. Ensamma mamman deals with a single mother and her two teenage children, her 14-year-old son Beppe and her daughter Mia, 17 years old.

Ensamma mamman received the Urhunden Prize by the Swedish Association for Promotion of Comics, in 1989.
