= Cecilia Torudd =

Swedish cartoonist

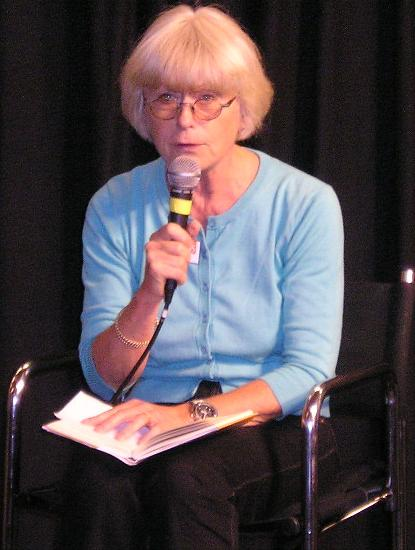
- Writing career
- Notable work: The Lonely Mother
- Notable awards: Urhunden Prize

Cecilia Torudd (born 1942) is a Swedish illustrator and author born in Lund. Since the 1970s, she has been a contributing illustrator for the children's magazine Kamratposten.

== Background ==
She is the daughter of Albert Levan, and Karin Malmberg. She studied Art Education at Konstfack, University College of Art, Crafts and Design in Stockholm, and is the author of Ensamma mamman. She is also known for her long standing contributions to Kamratposten.

== Familjeliv ==
Torudd's cartoon series Familjeliv (Family Life) was published in Kamratposten as a recurring feature during the 1980s. The series tells the story of the Larsson family, which consists of father Kenneth, mother Lisbet, the three children Lotta, Johan and Lillen and their dog Kalle. In the humorous series, she has portrayed everyday life with self-irony and from a female perspective.

== Ensamma mamman ==
Torudd's most famous series is The Lonely Mother, a humorous strip series that depicts everyday life from a female perspective. The series debuted in Dagens Nyheter's guest series section "DN series" in the autumn of 1985 and later returned as a daily series. It has since been collected in two serial albums and a number of later collection editions. A total of 500 comic strips were drawn over a period of three years and the series was published in a number of Swedish newspapers.

In 1989, Torudd received the Seriefrämjandet Urhunden Prize for Ensamma Mamman. The jury stated:

The Lonely Mother is a series that everyone – and that is, everyone – reads. It does not contain fancy adventures or glamorous heroes, but everyone can recognize themselves in it. Cecilia Torudd addresses the people of reality and "meets with body language and lines constantly in the middle of nowhere. The most rewritten series of recent years has succeeded with the piece of art in making the boring everyday life insanely amusing.

== Other works ==
Torud has written books, including Livet är ett helvete (Life is Hell) in 2001 and I huvudet på en gammal hagga (In the Head of an Old Hagga) in 2005. She wrote the script for the play Kunde prästänkan så kan väl du starring Pia Green which toured around Sweden from 1990 to 1994.

Everyday life with grandparents is the subject of a series of toddler books named En dag.... The first title in the series was A Day with Grandma: The Train Home (2015).

== Bibliography ==
- Daghemmet Rödmyran, 1982 (tillsammans med Siv Widerberg)
- Den stora systern, 1985 (tillsammans med Siv Widerberg)
- Flickan som inte ville gå till dagis, 1986 (tills. med Siv Widerberg)
- Familjeliv
  - Familjeliv (Rabén & Sjögren, 1986)
  - Mera familjeliv (Rabén & Sjögren, 1989)
  - Ännu mera familjeliv, 1994
- Ensamma mamman
  - Ensamma mamman (Rabén & Sjögren, 1988)
  - Mera Ensamma mamman (Rabén & Sjögren, 1989)
  - Boken med ensamma mamman, 1994
  - Ensamma mamman och andra berättelser, 1999
  - Ensamma mamman och annat genialt, 2008
  - Ensamma mamman och annat att fnissa åt, 2008
  - Ensamma mamman och andra roligheter, 2008
  - Ensamma mamman och annat mitt i prick, 2009
  - Ensamma mamman och annat kul och tänkvärt, 2010
- Med Sverige i tiden (Rabén & Sjögren, 1991)
- Vi måste bada!, 1995
- Korv till middag, 1995
- Pinnen, 1996
- Jätteskriket, 1996
- Trollpappan, 2000
- Livet är ett helvete, 2001
- Hjälp jag blöder, 2002
- Pirr i magen klump i halsen, 2003 (tillsammans med Annika Thor)
- I huvudet på en gammal hagga, 2005
- En dag…
  - En dag med mormor: tåget hem, 2015
  - En dag med morfar : sova borta, 2015
  - En dag med farmor : snabbkalaset, 2016
  - En dag med farfar : vi leker, 2016
