= Rössjöholm Castle =

Castle in Ängelholm Municipality, Scania, Sweden

- Rössjöholms slott
- Ängelholm Municipality
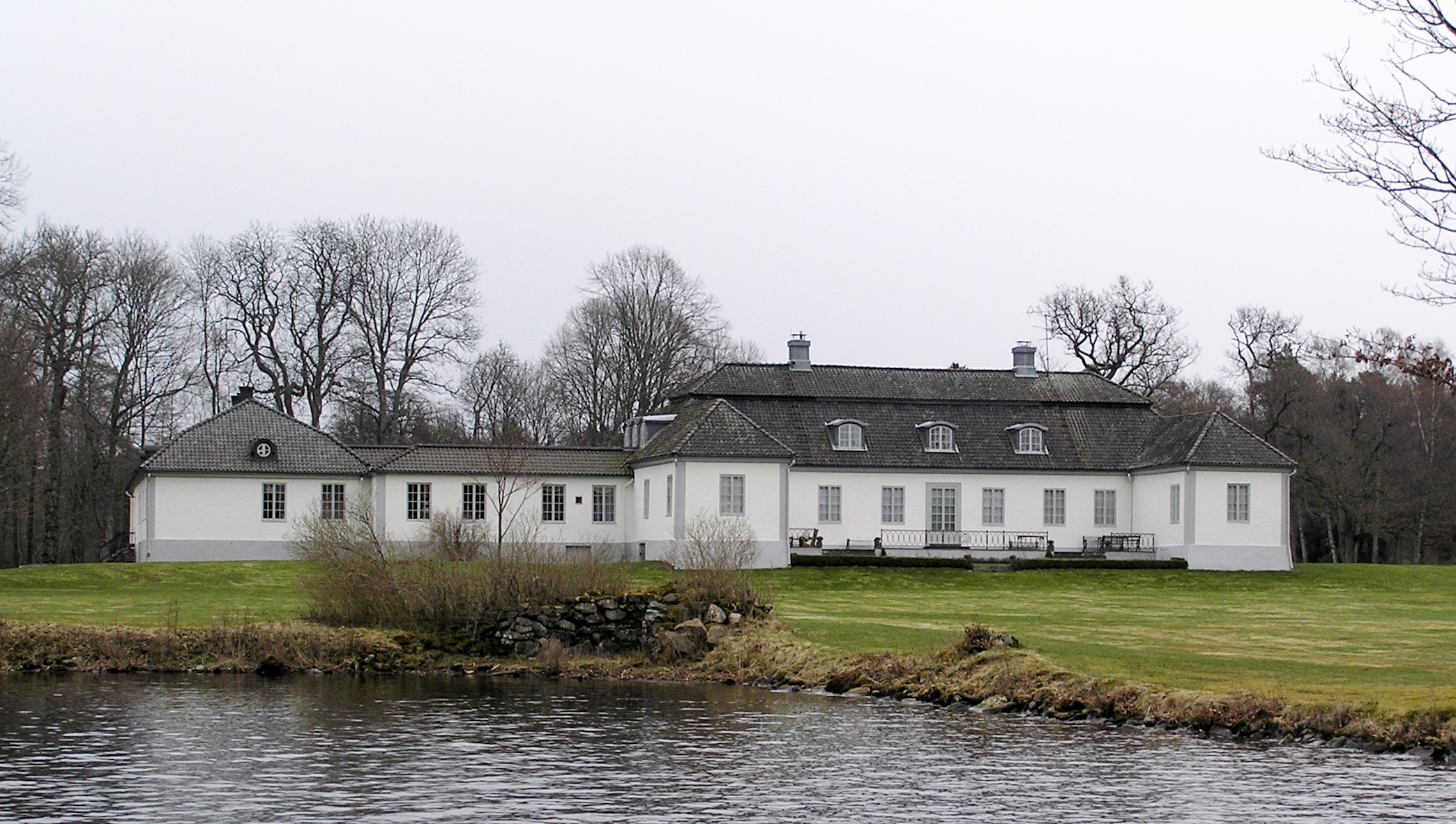
- Rössjöholm Castle

Site information
- Type: Castle
- Open to the public: No

Location
- Scania, Sweden
- Coordinates: 56.313611°N 13.094722°E

Site history
- Built: 1550s

Rössjöholm Castle (Swedish: Rössjöholms slott) is a castle in Ängelholm Municipality, Scania, in southern Sweden.

Rössjöholm Castle is located by Lake Rössjön ten miles northeast of Ängelholm. The current main building is a simple one-storey house with two wings, erected in 1731. An older fortress was first built there in 1533, and came to be used in the Scanian War, 1675–1679, at the end of which it was demolished by the Swedish forces to prevent the Danish from holding on to it.

The writer Frans G. Bengtsson, famous for the novel The Long Ships (1943), a viking saga adventure, grew up as the son of the caretaker of Rössjöholm Castle, and has told of his childhood in Den lustgård som jag minns (1953) ("Memories of an Eden"). His brother, the Olympic gold medalist and military officer, Bengt Bengtsson, was also born at the castle.

== See also ==
- List of castles in Sweden
