= Charlie Christensen =

Swedish comics artist

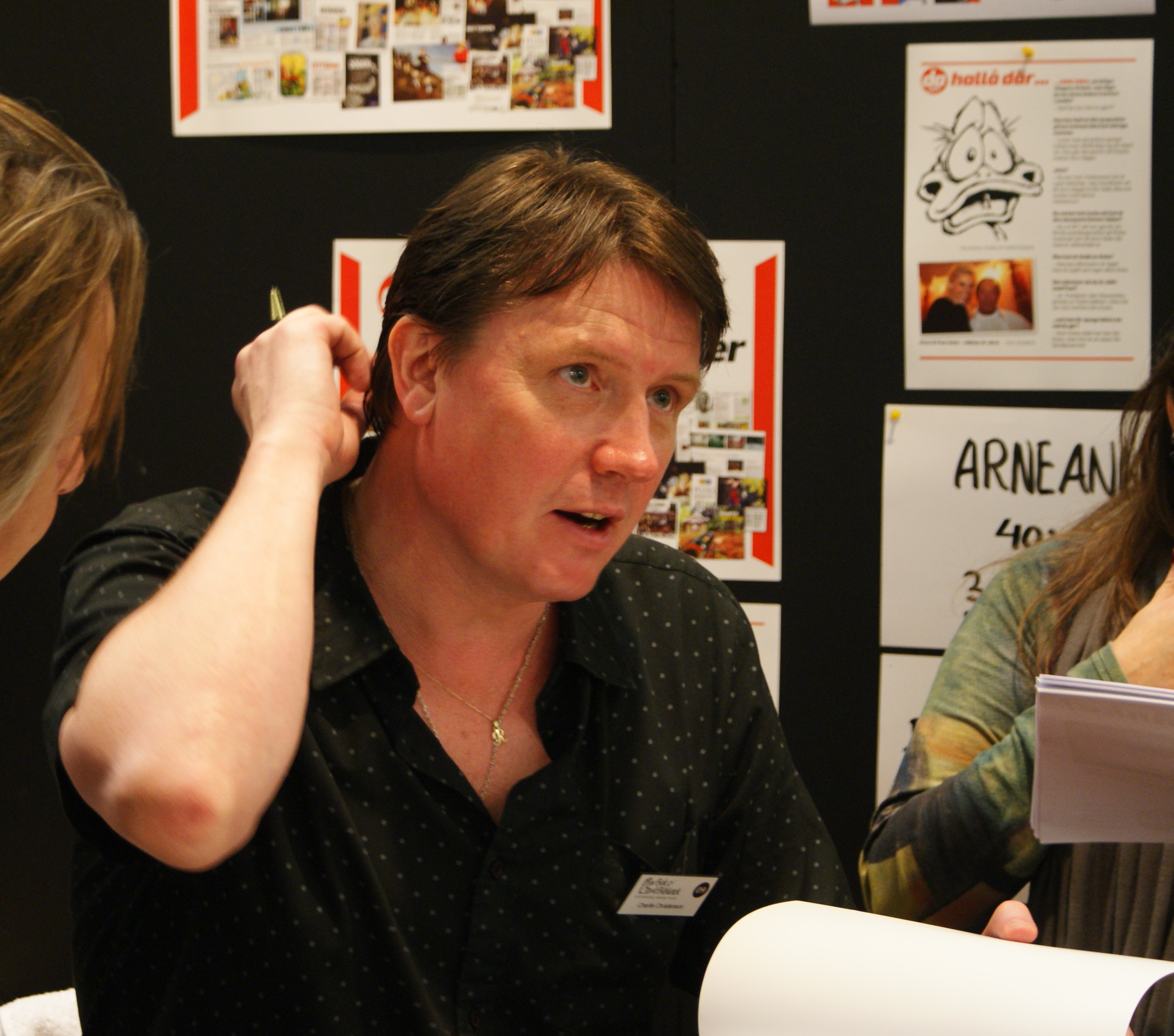
- Christensen at the Gothenburg Book Fair in 2009
- Born: 11 June 1958 (age 68); Bromma, Sweden
- Other name: Alexander Barks

Hans Allan "Charlie" Christensen (born 11 June 1958 in Bromma) is a Swedish comics artist best known of his Donald Duck parody Arne Anka. He has lived in the Spanish city of Pamplona since 1988.

Christensen's other works include the series Röde Orm (with Patric Nyström), which is a comics version of Frans G. Bengtsson's adventure novel The Long Ships and Odilou, a story of a boy seeking for his love during the Russian Revolution. Christensen has received the Urhunden Prize of best Swedish comics album in 1990, 1992 and 1994.

== Works ==
=== Arne Anka ===
- Arne Anka (1989)
- Arne Anka II (1991)
- Arne Anka III (1993)
- Arne Anka IV (1995)
- Jag Arne – Arne Ankas samlade serier 1983–1995 (1999)
- Arne Anka V – Återuppståndelsen (2006)
- Arne Anka VI – Manövrer i mörkret (2007)
- Arne Anka VII – Ner med monarkin (2008)
- Arne Anka VIII – Rapport från kriget (2010)
- Arne Anka del 9 - Voodoo vid vatten (2011)
- Jag Arne del två – Samlade serier 2005–2010 (2012)
- "Arne Anka del 10 - Utsikt från en svamp" (2013)
- "Arne Anka del 11 - Dagbok från Svitjod" (2014)
- "Arne Anka del 12 - Mentala Selfies" (2016)
- "Arne Anka del 13 - Alla dessa krig talar om oss själva" (2022)

=== Röde Orm ===
- Röde Orm (1999)
- Röde Orm – Andra delen: I Allahs namn (2001)
- Röde Orm – Tredje delen: Julgillet (2002)
- Röde Orm – Fjärde delen: Slaget vid Maeldun och vad som därav kom (2004)

=== Other ===
- Ikoner (1995)
- Odilou (2008)
