= Agent Annorlunda =

Comic strip by Johan Unenge and Måns Gahrton

- Author(s): Måns Gahrton
- Illustrator(s): Johan Unenge
- Genre(s): adventure

"Agent Annorlunda" was a Swedish comic strip written by Måns Gahrton and illustrated by Johan Unenge. Eight albums were published between 1986 and 1992. In 1992, it was also featured as an FF med Bert guest comics, introduced in 1995's issue 5.

== Publication ==
The seven first comic albums were published at Bonniers Juniorförlag. The last ones were published by Carlsen/if's label Carlsen Comics in 1992, one year before Carlsen/if and Bonniers Juniorförlag were merged becoming Bonnier Carlsen Bokförlag.

1. "Ett fall för Agent Annorlunda", 1986
2. "Samvetssamlaren", 1986
3. "Herkules harem", 1986
4. "Den osynliga tjuven", 1987
5. "Det vettlösa vattnet", 1987
6. "Stjärnkraft", 1988
7. "Mozarts marionetter", 1990
8. "Det sjungande sjöodjuret", 1992
