= Röde Orm (comic book) =

1999–2004 comic by Charlie Christensen

- Page count: 210 pages
- Publisher: Ordfront Galago

Creative team
- Writer: Charlie Christensen; Patric Nyström (1st album); after Frans G. Bengtsson
- Artist: Charlie Christensen

Original publication
- Issues: 4
- Date of publication: 1999–2004
- Language: Swedish
- ISBN: 9189248554

Röde Orm (lit. 'Red Serpent') is a Swedish comic book by Charlie Christensen, published as four albums in 1999–2004 and as a single volume in 2004. It is set in the Viking Age and follows Orm Tostesson from Scania on a series of adventures in Spain, Denmark, Ireland and England. It is based on the novel The Long Ships by Frans G. Bengtsson. The first album was co-written by Christensen and Patric Nyström and the rest were written by Christensen.

== See also ==
- Arne Anka, another comic by Christensen
- The Long Ships, a 1964 film loosely based on the same novel
