= Fredrik Strömberg =

Swedish journalist and author

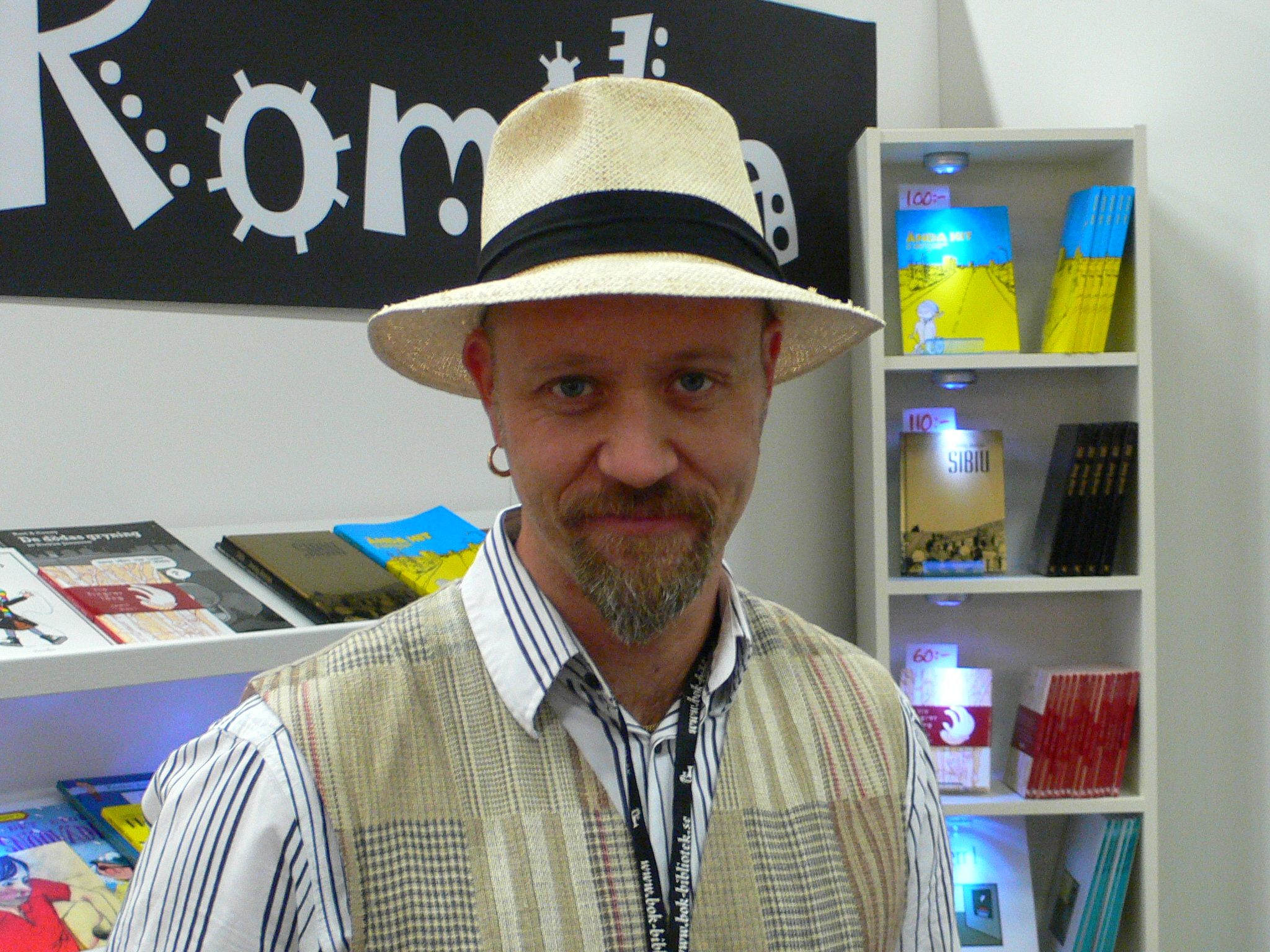
- Fredrik Strömberg at Gothenburg Book Fair 2007
- Born: 14 July 1968 (age 58)
- Occupations: Journalist & author
- Writing career
- Subject: Comics
- Website: www.sekventiellt.se

Fredrik Strömberg (born 14 July 1968) is a Swedish journalist and author, writing mostly about comics. He is the chairman of Seriefrämjandet (the Swedish Comics Association), the editor for Bild & Bubbla and the headmaster for a comics art school.

== Career ==
Strömberg started his professional career as a freelance journalist in 1994, and he has since then written for a large number of publications including the Swedish Dagens Nyheter, the Danish Strip!, the Dutch Stripschrift and the American International Journal of Comic Art.

Strömberg has been the chairman of Seriefrämjandet (the Swedish Comics Association) since 1997, is one of the editors of the magazine Bild & Bubbla and a member of the Urhunden jury. He was also one of the driving forces behind the establishment of Seriecenter (the Comics Art Centre) in Malmö and Seriearkivet (the Swedish Comics Archive) in Lund.

In 1999, Strömberg made his debut as an author with the book 100 oumbärliga seriealbum (100 Indispensable Comic Books), and has since written several books, published in Swedish and English. The book Black Images in the Comics: A Visual History, published by Fantagraphics Books in the US, was nominated for an Eisner Award.

Since 1999 Strömberg has been one of the headmasters for Serieskolan i Malmö (the Comics Art School of Malmö), a school which has trained comics artists like Niklas Asker (Second Thoughts) and Mathias Elftorp (Piracy is Liberation).

Strömberg is the Swedish representative on the International Editorial Board for the International Journal of Comic Art and also the Swedish representative on the Consultative Committee of European Comic Art.

Strömberg also works as a curator for exhibitions about comics, and has created exhibitions such as "serier.nu", "Manga! - de japanska seriernas intåg", "Duckomenta Malmö" and "Sanningen bodde inte i honom".

== Bibliography ==
- 100 oumbärliga seriealbum, Bibliotekstjänst, 1999
- Serienegern – En bildberättelse om fördomar, Seriefrämjandet, 2001
- Vad är tecknade serier? En begreppsanalys, Seriefrämjandet, 2003
- Swedish Comics History, Seriefrämjandet, 2003
- Black Images in the Comics, Fantagraphics Books, 2003
- The Comics Go to Hell, Fantagraphics Books 2005
- Seriebiblioteket, Bibliotekstjänst 2005
- Manga! - Japanska serier och skaparglädje, Seriefrämjandet 2007
- Mangabiblioteket - introduktion till den asiatiska seriekulturen, Bibliotekstjänst 2008
- Comic Art Propaganda 2010
- Jewish Images in the Comics, Fantagraphics Book 2012
