= The Long Ships (film) =

1964 film by Jack Cardiff

- Original cinema poster
- Directed by: Jack Cardiff
- Screenplay by: Beverley Cross; Berkely Mather
- Based on: The Long Ships by Frans G. Bengtsson
- Produced by: Irving Allen
- Starring: Richard Widmark; Sidney Poitier; Russ Tamblyn; Rosanna Schiaffino
- Narrated by: Edward Judd
- Cinematography: Christopher Challis
- Edited by: Geoffrey Foot
- Music by: Dušan Radić
- Color process: Technicolor
- Production companies: Warwick Films; Avala Film
- Distributed by: Columbia Pictures
- Release dates: 3 March 1964 (London); 24 June 1964 (New York City)
- Running time: 126 minutes
- Countries: United Kingdom; Yugoslavia
- Language: English
- Budget: $3,000,000
- Box office: $840,000 (UK) $1,930,000 (US/ Canada rentals)

The Long Ships is a 1964 Anglo-Yugoslav adventure film shot in Technirama directed by Jack Cardiff and starring Richard Widmark, Sidney Poitier, Russ Tamblyn and Rosanna Schiaffino.

== Plot ==
The story centres on an immense golden bell named the Mother of Voices, which may or may not exist. Moorish king Aly Mansuh is convinced that it does. Having collected all the legendary material about it that he can, he plans to mount an expedition to search for it. When a shipwrecked Norseman, Rolfe, repeats the story of the bell in the marketplace, and hints that he knows its location, he is seized by Mansuh's men and brought in for questioning. Rolfe insists that he does not know more than the legend itself and that the bell is most likely only a myth. He manages to escape by jumping through a window before the questioning continues under torture.

After swimming back to return home, Rolfe reveals to his father Krok and his brother Orm that he did indeed hear the bell pealing on the night his ship was wrecked in Africa. However, Rolfe's father has been made destitute after spending a fortune building a funeral ship for the Danish king, Harald Bluetooth, who then refuses to reimburse him by citing an outstanding debt. Rationalising that the ship does not yet belong to Harald (since he is still living), Rolfe and Orm not only steal the ship, but hire a number of inebriated Vikings to serve as its crew. In order to prevent Harald from killing his father in revenge for the theft, he also takes the king's daughter as a hostage. Harald declares that he will summon every longship he can find and rescue her.

Since the ship was intended as a funeral ship, the crew begins to get superstitious and demands to return home. Rolfe asks the ship's captain what's the way to sway the bad luck off them, and he states that a maiden must be sacrificed to the gods. He pretends to do so (he kills a sheep instead) and later reveals the trick to Orm. After prolonged difficulties at sea, the ship is damaged in a maelstrom, and the Norse are cast ashore in a Moorish shore. After getting attacked and captured by the Moors, the Norse are condemned to execution, where Mansuh reencounters Rolfe and again demands to know where the Mother of Voices is. Mansuh's favourite wife Aminah convinces her husband to use them and their longship to retrieve the bell. After they sail to the Pillars of Hercules, Rolfe and Mansuh find only a domed chapel with a tiny bronze bell hanging in it, where the Viking was certain he had heard the Mother of Voices. Frustrated, Rolfe shoves the hanging bell against a wall, and the resounding cacophony reveals that the chapel dome itself is the disguised Mother of Voices.

After a costly misadventure topples the Mother of Voices from its clifftop down to the sea, the expedition finally returns to the Moorish city, Aly Mansuh triumphantly riding through the streets with the bell in tow. However, King Harald and his men, including Krok, out to rescue the princess, have since conquered the city, and upon Aly Mansuh's arrival they leap out of hiding. The climactic battle ensues, and ends when the bell falls over and crushes Aly Mansuh; the Moors are defeated and the Vikings victorious. The film ends with Rolfe trying his best to persuade King Harald to mount another expedition for the "three crowns of the Saxon kings", much to Krok's amusement.

== Cast ==
- Richard Widmark as Rolfe
- Sidney Poitier as King Aly Mansuh
- Russ Tamblyn as Orm
- Rosanna Schiaffino as Aminah
- Oskar Homolka as Krok
- Edward Judd as Sven
- Lionel Jeffries as Aziz
- Beba Lončar as Gerda
- Clifford Evans as King Harald
- Gordon Jackson as Vahlin
- Colin Blakely as Rhykka
- David Lodge as Olla
- Henry Oscar as Auctioneer
- Paul Stassino as Raschid
- Jeanne Moody as Ylva

== Background ==
The film was very loosely based on the two volume Swedish novel Röde Orm (Red Orm) (1941 and 1945) by Frans G. Bengtsson, retaining the title "The Long Ships" of the English translation, and the Moorish settings of one part of Red Orm's first voyage. There was also the Moorish chieftain, Almansur the Conqueror, and the great bell of St. James, from the source book. The protagonist in the film is an added character named Rolfe, with his younger brother named Orm. The film was released in Sweden with the title Röde Orm och de långa skeppen (Red Orm and the Long Ships), in an attempt to exploit the popularity of the novel with its actual hero. It was also intended to capitalise on the success of recent Viking and Moorish dramas such as The Vikings (1958) and El Cid (1961) and was later followed by Alfred the Great (1969).

== Development ==
Bruce Geller wrote the first draft of the script in 1959. In April 1959 Irving Allen announced he would make it for a budget of £2 million (US$5.6 million) through his company with Albert Broccoli, Warwick Films. That year the Yugoslav government pledged money for the production.

In October 1959 Albert Broccoli said "We are in disagreement with our distributors, Columbia, over the casting. They want star names in the lead, but we think it's a subject strong enough to carry unknowns."

The film was originally meant to be directed by José Ferrer, who had made The Cockleshell Heroes for Irving Allen. Ferrer said he was looking for "a Burt Lancaster type and a Tony Curtis type and two girls" for the lead. He was not intending to act in the film.

Ferrer eventually dropped out and was replaced by Jack Cardiff who had been cinematographer on The Vikings (1958); Richard Widmark was signed to star.

In June 1960 Warwick announced it would not make films through major studios but would produce and distribute films itself with a slate of pictures worth $8 million a year: "three big films a year" plus eight others which it would finance through Eros (that would cost an estimated $3 million all up). Warwick's first new film would be The Long Ships, a $3.5 million spectacle, following by The Hellions. Both would be shot in Yugoslavia. (The Hellions wound up being filed in South Africa.)

George Peppard claimed he turned down a lead role despite a fee of $200,000 because he did not want to spend six months in Yugoslavia.

"It is obvious that Tito's government is anxious to see more and more foreign filmmakers come to Yugoslavia", said Allen. "And of course it is also in the best interests of the American and British governments to encourage anything that improves Yugoslavia's financial independence from the Soviet bloc. I'm sure Belgrade will soon catch up with London and Rome."

== Production ==
Filming took place on Avala Hill.

Jack Cardiff recalled "It turned out to be more of a comedy picture after all because you can’t really take those sort of things too seriously. I think if it had been done in the right way with big tough Norwegians, it would have made all the difference. But when you’ve got a mixed cast it never quite rings as it should do.”

Michael Reeves, future film director, worked on the movie as a runner.

The American Legion condemned the production of the film – along with another Hollywood-financed film shot in Yugoslavia, Lancelot and Guinevere – as "immoral, deceptive, unethical and detrimental to the best interests of the United States and the free world."

"It wasn't a happy time", said Widmark of the shoot.

== Reception ==
The film performed very well in the United Kingdom, grossing $840,000. It was among the ten most popular films of the year at the British box office in 1964. In the US and Canada it earned rentals of $1,930,000.

It was one of Tamblyn's last studio pictures.

== Awards ==
- Nominee Best Costume Design – BAFTA (Anthony Mendleson)

== Trivia ==
The sets for the film were recycled by the 1965 Swedish adventure film Här kommer bärsärkarna.

== See also ==
- Great Bell of Dhammazedi
- Röde Orm, a comic book based on the same novel
