= Jan Lööf =

Swedish illustrator, author, comic creator, and jazz musician

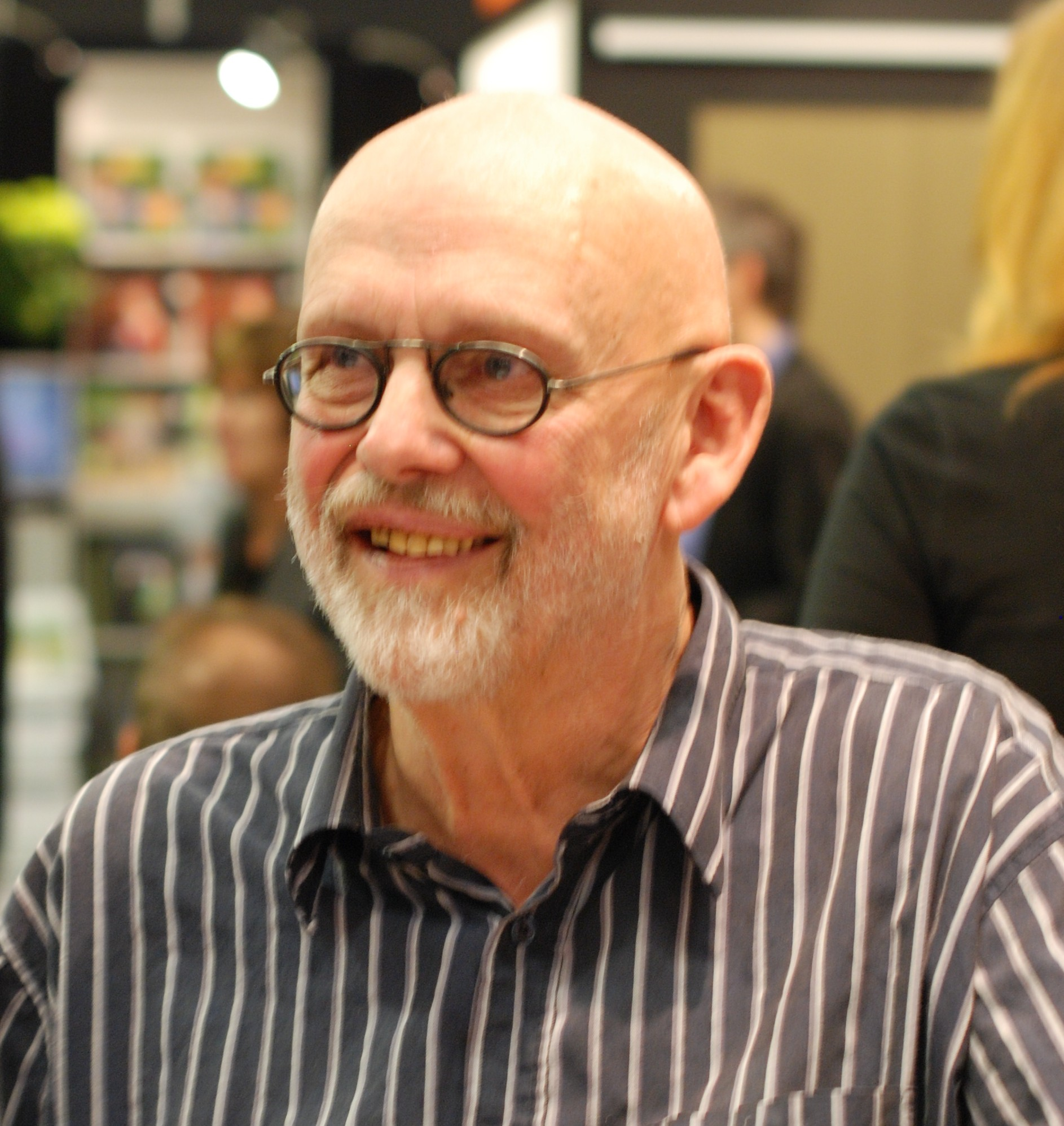
- Jan Lööf, at the Göteborg Book Fair, 2010
- Born: 30 May 1940 (age 86); Trollhättan, Sweden
- Education: Studied at Konstfack in Stockholm
- Occupations: Illustrator, author, comic creator, jazz musician
- Known for: Creator of the comic strip "Felix"
- Notable work: "Felix," "Bellman," "Ville," children's books
- Awards: Astrid Lindgren Prize (2011), Selma Lagerlöf Prize (2010), Urhunden (2009), and others

Jan Lööf (born 30 May 1940 in Trollhättan) is a Swedish illustrator, author, comic creator, and jazz musician.

== Life and career ==
Lööf studied at Konstfack in Stockholm in the early 1960s.

From 1967 until 1973 he created his most famous comic strip Felix, which soon gained popularity into many parts of the world. Mixing humor and adventure, Felix has sometimes been described as a more naivistic or underground style version of Tintin, in terms of the drawing style, but in its themes and morale it is also somewhat leftist.

Later, Lööf created other comics, such as Bellman (a humor strip about a Stockholm hobo) and Ville (1975–76), a "comedic adventure" about an unemployed Stockholm author, teaming up with Olof Palme and Carl XVI Gustaf to fight the bad guys. This was originally serialized in the Swedish periodical Vi.

In the early 1970s, Lööf participated as an actor in a few productions, among them the Swedish cult children's TV show Tårtan (The Cake, 1972) about three incompetent and filthy sailors-turned-bakers.

His children's books are continually popular, both in Scandinavia and elsewhere. Among them are The Story of the Red Apple (Sagan om det röda äpplet, 1974) and Uncle Louie's Fantastic Sea Voyage (Morfar är sjörövare, 1966 – lit. Grandpa is a Pirate). Based on these books Lööf produced his own children's show, the animated Skrot-Nisse och Hans Vänner (Scrap-Nisse and his Friends), for Swedish National Television in 1985.

He has also illustrated children's books written by his friend and colleague Carl Johan De Geer.

== Awards ==
Jan Lööf has received a number of awards.

- 2011: Astrid Lindgren Prize
- 2010: Selma Lagerlöf Prize
- 2009: "Urhunden"
- 2005: Bokjuryn (sv:Bokjuryn)
- 1985: Golden Antenna (sv:Guldantennen)
- 1977: Elsa Beskow Plaque (sv:Elsa Beskow-plaketten)
- 1976: 91:an Scholarship Award(sv:91:an-stipendiet)
- 1974: Expressen's Heffalump (sv:Expressens Heffalump)
- 1968: Adamson Award
