= Stromberg =

Stromberg, Strömberg, Strømberg, or Stroemberg may refer to:

== Places ==
=== Germany ===
- Stromberg, Oelde, a town in Oelde
- Stromberg (landscape), a region in Baden-Württemberg
  - Stromberg-Heuchelberg Nature Park
- Stromberg (Siebengebirge), a mountain peak now better known as Petersberg
- Stromberg (Verbandsgemeinde), a collective municipality in the district of Bad Kreuznach in Rheinland-Pfalz
  - Stromberg (Hunsrück), a town and the seat of the collective municipality

== People ==
- Stromberg (surname), people with the surname of any spelling variant

== Corporate ==
- Stromberg, a Carburettor brand name used by Zenith Carburettor Company (British) and the Bendix Corporation
- Strömberg (company), a Finnish manufacturer of electronic products
- Stromberg Guitars, an American company producing guitars, mainly for jazz musicians, between 1906 and 1955
- Stromberg-Carlson, an American manufacturer of telephone equipment, radios and television
- Stromberg-Voisinet, manufacturer of musical instruments

== Other uses ==
- Stromberg (TV series), a German television series
- Stromberg v. California, a 1931 United States Supreme Court case
- Strömberg wavelet in mathematics
- Karl Stromberg, the main antagonist in the 1977 James Bond film The Spy Who Loved Me

== See also ==
- Stein–Strömberg theorem in mathematics
