= Stromberg (surname) =

Stromberg, Strömberg, Strømberg, Strombergs, Štrombergs, etc. is a surname from Denmark, Finland, Germany, Norway and Sweden and now common in the English language where it is occasionally written as Stroemberg.

== People ==
- Anna-Belle Strömberg (born 1965), Swedish politician
- Arne Strömberg (1920–1988), Swedish ice hockey coach
- Arvid Strömberg (born 1991), Swedish ice hockey player
- Bill Stromberg, former CEO of T. Rowe Price
- Carin Strömberg (born 1993), Swedish handball player
- Charlotte Strömberg (born 1959), Swedish corporate leader
- Conny Strömberg (born 1975), Swedish former ice hockey left winger
- Eugén Strömberg (1895–1971), Swedish military doctor
- Ewa Strömberg, Swedish actress
- Fredrik Strömberg, Swedish journalist and author
- Glenn Strömberg (born 1960), Swedish former soccer player
- Gustaf Strömberg (1882–1962), Swedish-American astronomer
- Holger Stromberg, German chef
- Hunt Stromberg (1894–1968), American film producer
- Hunt Stromberg Jr. (1923–1986), American Broadway, radio and television producer
- Johan Peter Strömberg (1773–1834), Swedish actor, dancer and theatre director
- John Stromberg (1853–1902), American songwriter, composer, and conductor born in Canada
- Keaton Stromberg (born 1996), American rap rock musician
- Kim Strömberg (born 1987), Finnish professional ice hockey winger
- Lyndon Stromberg, American sculptor and designer
- Malin Strömberg, former Swedish Olympic swimmer
- Märta Strömberg (1921–2012), Swedish archaeologist.
- Mika Strömberg, Finnish professional ice hockey defenceman
- Mikko Strömberg (born 1979), Finnish former professional ice hockey goaltender
- Ole Christian Strømberg (born 1972), Norwegian bobsledder
- Paul Griffith Stromberg (1892–1952), American newspaper owner/editor and politician
- Ricky Stromberg (born 2000), American football player
- Robert Stromberg (born 1965), American special effects artist, designer and filmmaker
- Robin Strömberg (born 1992), Swedish footballer
- Thorvald Strömberg, Finnish Olympic sprint canoer
- Ulf Strömberg (1959– 2001), Swedish cameraman shot and killed by robbers in Afghanistan while covering the War in Afghanistan
- Wesley Stromberg (born 1993), American rap rock musician

== Fictional characters ==
- Karl Stromberg, character in the James Bond film The Spy Who Loved Me

== See also ==
- Stramberg
- Stromberg (disambiguation)
