= Kati Kovács (comics) =

Finnish cartoonist (born 1963)

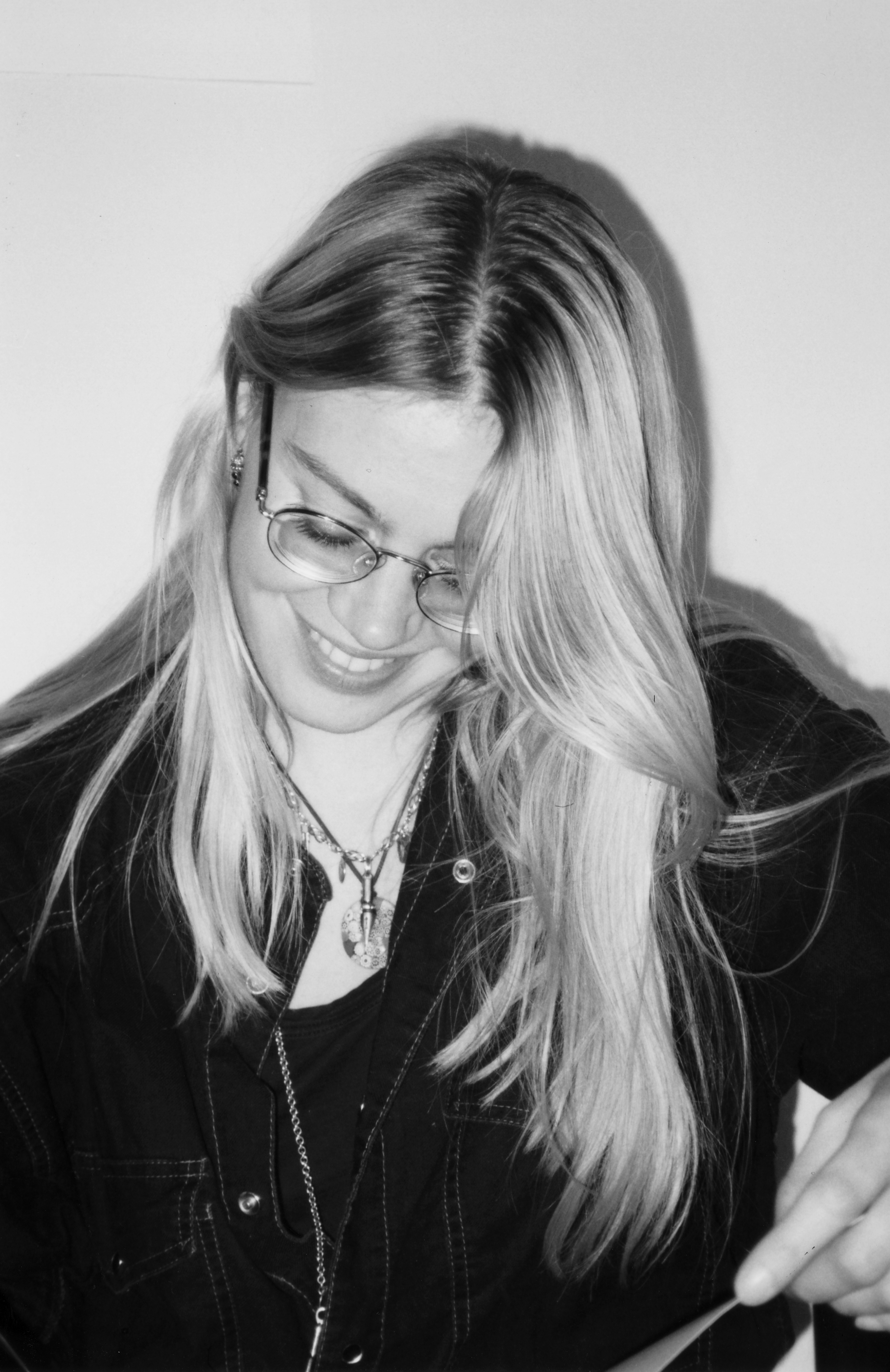
- Kati Kovács at the book fair in Gothenburg in 1995.
- Born: 26 December 1963 (age 62) Helsinki, Finland

Marje Katalin "Kati" Kovács (born 26 December 1963) is a Finnish comics artist. She has released albums in Finnish, Swedish, German, French and Hungarian. Kovács has won several series prizes, including the 1998 Urhunden Prizes for the 1997 best-selling album. Since 1986 she is living in Rome, Italy.

== Biography ==
Kovács was born in 1963 in Helsinki, Finland, to Finnish parents (her grandfather is, however, a Hungarian, hence the surname). She grew up in Finland and became interested in drawing early. As early as nine, she received her first drawing, in a children's magazine, where she submitted her contribution. In 1982 she visited Italy for school and learning Italian. In 1986 Kovács returned to Italy - for good. She fell in love with an Italian (he worked as a dog trainer) and settled with him in Rome. They then got two children together.

In 1989 Kati Kovács published as a series maker for the first time, in the magazine Kannus. To the magazine she had already sent twelve (!) Years earlier in series never published. Kovács introduced more publications to become part of the 1990s new Finnish series of volunteers, which in some parts were translated into Swedish at, among others, Optimal Press.

Her debut album was released in 1994 by Finnish publisher Like, who gave her free hands. The result was Vihreä rapsodia, a wild surreal journey, where the ten-year-old Kiti goes to Hungary to visit her friend Erika. Once upon a time she walks out for a multitude of strange revelations and episodes, including naked Mongols (asking for the ticket), talking dogs and a very strange circus. The main character Kiti recalls in the story a part of Hungary as Kovács himself visited virtually every summer during the youth - grandfather was a youngster. Some autobiography, however, is the series far away - "Well, I was always called Kati!"

Vihreä rapsodia, with their aunts living in fountains and dreamy strange ticket controllers, set the model for Kati Kovács' comics artistry. Since the debut she has brought about ten albums, half of which has been translated into Swedish. Albums have also appeared in French, German and Hungarian, and including various newspaper releases, her series has been published in ten European countries. Two of the albums feature script by Pauli Kallio, a Finnish series writer from Kovács' generation who also wrote several series of titles such as Ville Pirinen and Tiitu Takalo.

== Bibliography ==
=== Books ===
Original edition (in Finnish) is the first, secondary edition below with embedded text. Albums in Swedish are in bold.

- 1994 – Vihreä rapsodia, Like
  - 1995 – **Grön rapsodi**, Optimal Press (Swedish)
  - 2009 – Paprikás rapszódia (Hungarian)
- 1996 – Karu selli, Like
  - 1997 – **Karu cell**, Optimal Press (Swedish)
  - 1998 – Karussell, Schreiber & Leser (German)
- 2001 – Pahvilapsi, Like
  - 2002 – **Kartongbarnet**, Optimal Press (Swedish)
  - 2003 – Sirkka, la petite fille des rues, Éditions de l'An 2 (French)
- 2001 – Minne matka Laura Liha, Suomen yrityslehdet
- 2003 – Miestennielijäksi sirkukseen, Arktiken Banaani (collection album with shorter series)
  - 2004 – **Mansslukerska på cirkus**, Optimal Press (Swedish)
- 2004 – Josef Vimmatun tarina, Arktinen Banaani
- 2004 – Onnen lahjat, Arktiken Banaani (script of Pauli Kallio)
- 2007 – Väritetyt unet, Arktiken Banaani (script of Pauli Kallio)
- 2008 – Viidakkonaisena Vatikaanin varjossa, Arktinen Banaani
- 2009 – Onnen lahjat 2: Tappele kuin mies! (script of Pauli Kallio)
- 2010 – Kuka pelkää Nenian Ahnavia?, Arktinen Banaani
  - 2012 – **Vem är rädd för Anniv Klammag?**, Optimal Press (Swedish)
