= Albert Levan =

Swedish botanist and geneticist

- Born: 8 March 1905; Gothenburg, Sweden
- Died: 28 March 1998 (aged 93); Lund, Sweden
- Education: University of Lund (Ph.D. 1935)
- Known for: Showing that humans have 46 chromosomes
- Spouse: Karin Malmberg
- Children: Cecilia Torudd, Göran Levan
- Parents: Emil Levan (father); Amy Gabrielsson (mother)
- Scientific career
- Fields: Genetics, cytologist
- Institutions: University of Lund

Albert Levan (8 March 1905, Gothenburg – 28 March 1998, Lund) was a Swedish botanist and geneticist.

== Life ==
Albert Levan was born in Gothenburg in 1905, son of Emil Levan and Amy Gabrielsson. He was educated at the University of Lund, where he received his doctorate in 1935, and became professor of cytology in the same university in 1961. He married Karin Malmberg, a pianist, and was the father of illustrator Cecilia Torudd and Göran Levan, professor of genetics at the University of Gothenburg. He died in Lund in 1998.

== Research ==
Albert Levan is best known today for co-authoring the report in 1956 that humans had 46 chromosomes (instead of 48, as previously believed). This epochal discovery was made by Joe Hin Tjio in Levan's laboratory.

Originally specialising in plant cytology, Levan later turned to the similarities in the chromosome structure of cancer cells and errors introduced to plant cells via chemical or radioactive elements. These studies later led to examination of chromosomes in animal cells.

In 1953, a mistake involving mixing HeLa cells with the wrong liquid led Joe Hin Tjio and Albert Levan to develop better techniques for staining and counting chromosomes. It allowed researchers for the first time to see and count each chromosome clearly in the HeLa cells with which they were working. They were the first to show that humans have 23 pairs of chromosomes rather than 24, as was previously believed. This was important for the study of developmental disorders, such as Down syndrome, that involve the number of chromosomes.

== Honours ==
Levan was elected a member of the Finnish Society of Sciences and Letters in 1961, and of the Royal Swedish Academy of Sciences in 1967.
