= Gunnar Krantz (artist) =

Swedish comic creator and artist

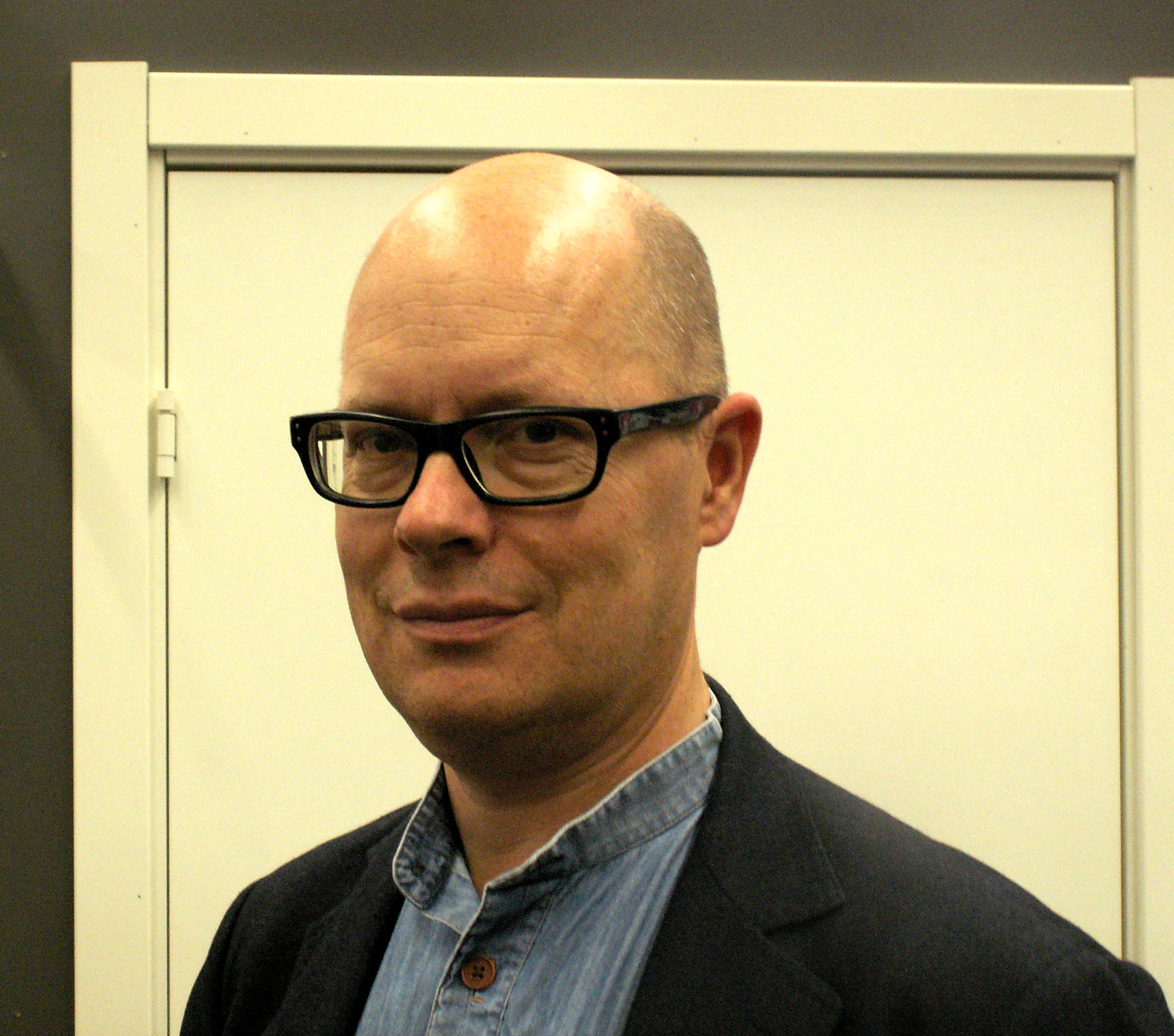
Gunnar Krantz in 2012

Gunnar Krantz (born 1962) is a Swedish comic creator and artist. He started creating modern-style black and white comics in the 1980s, making a name for himself in the Swedish fanzine community. His professional debut was the acclaimed album Alger in 1986.

In the 1990s, Krantz became one of the pioneers of Swedish autobiographical comics in a kitchen-sink realist style, inspired by Harvey Pekar and other North Americans. This started with the release of his album Superangst in 1993 and has continued to this day with works such 1981, Nollad, Nazi Beatles, Cykel-Hippie, Vänster Vänster and Punk Provocateur. Throughout the years, he has contributed to several Swedish alternative comic publications (Pox, Elixir, Galago).

Although he is most known for his work in the comics field, Gunnar Krantz has been involved in several other kinds of art projects. He is co-founder of the art discussion forum Konstarenan.

Krantz is currently, as of 2010, one of the teachers on Serieskolan i Malmö, a comics- and illustration-oriented school in Malmö.
