= The Long Ships =

Swedish-language adventure book

- First English-language edition (1954)
- Author: Frans G. Bengtsson
- Original title: Röde Orm
- Translator: Barrows Mussey; Michael Meyer
- Cover artist: Gunnar Brusewitz
- Language: Swedish
- Publisher: Norstedts
- Publication date: 1941–1945
- Publication place: Sweden
- English publication date: 1954
- Pages: 603 (total pages)

The Long Ships or Red Orm (original Swedish: Röde Orm, "Red Serpent = Snake/Dragon", lit. 'Worm the Red') is an adventure novel by the Swedish writer Frans Gunnar Bengtsson. The narrative is set in the late 10th century and follows the adventures of the Viking Röde Orm - called "Red" for his hair and his temper, a native of Scania. The book portrays the political situation of Europe in the later Viking Age, Andalusia under Almansur, Denmark under Harald Bluetooth, followed by the struggle between Eric the Victorious and Sven Forkbeard, Ireland under Brian Boru, England under Ethelred the Unready, and the Battle of Maldon, and then the Byzantine Empire and its Varangian Guard, Kievan Rus and its neighbors the Patzinaks—all before the backdrop of the gradual Christianization of Scandinavia, contrasting the pragmatic Norse pagan outlook with the exclusiveness of Islam and Christianity.

The novel is divided into two parts, published in 1941 and 1945, with two books each. It used to be one of the most widely read books in Sweden. The first part was translated into English by Barrows Mussey as Red Orm in 1943, but later editions and newer translations by Michael Meyer use the title The Long Ships. The book has been translated into at least 23 languages. It was the basis for the 1999–2004 comic book Röde Orm by Charlie Christensen.

== Characters ==
=== Main characters ===
- Orm Tostesson: The son and youngest child of Toste, a Scanian chieftain.
- Åsa: Orm's mother. The family matriarch, mother of 5 sons and 3 daughters.
- Toke Grey-Gullsson (Toke Grågullesson): An adventurer from Blekinge who joined Krok's company. He becomes the lifelong friend of Orm.
- Father Willibald: A priest assigned as physician to King Harald's court.
- Ylva Haraldsdotter: King Harald's daughter with an Obotrite slave-girl. Later Orm's wife.

=== Secondary characters ===
- Krok: The leader of the expedition to Spain.
- Rapp: A member of the expedition, then a galley slave with its other survivors. Later a retainer of Orm.
- Gudmund: A landowner who has a tense relationship with Orm.
- Olof Styrsson: An experienced chieftain from Finnveden.
- Ludmilla Ormsdotter: Orm's restless daughter. Betrothed to Olof.

=== Recurring characters ===
- Solomon the Jew: A Sephardi silversmith rescued by Krok's company.
- Lady Subaida: The young daughter of a Leonese margrave. This is the name given to her after she becomes a concubine of Almanzor.
- The Erin Masters: Two jester brothers (Felimid and Ferdiad) from Ireland.
- Rainald: A Lotharingian priest sent to Scandinavia to replace a priest held as a thrall.
- Mirah: An Andalusian slave-girl at King Harald's court. Also Toke's future wife

== Plot ==
Orm and his Viking companions follow Almansur in his campaigns against the Christian kingdoms of the North.

The first book covers the years 982 to 990. While still a youth, Orm is abducted by a Viking party led by Krok and they sail south. They fall captive to Andalusian Muslims and serve as galley slaves for more than two years, later becoming members of Almansur's bodyguard for four years, raiding Santiago de Compostela under his command. They return to Denmark to King Harald Bluetooth's court where Orm meets Ylva and Father Willibald. Orm later returns to Scania with Rapp. Orm and Rapp join a Viking party raiding England again after a brief period of peace in that area following the reconquest of the Danelaw in the mid-10th century by King Edgar, Ethelred's father. Orm joins a party led by Thorkell the High in England and when he learns that Harald's daughter Ylva is staying in London, gets baptised and marries her. They move to a neglected farm, his mother's inheritance in Göinge, northern Skåne, near the border with Småland. During the following years (992 to 995), Orm prospers, and Ylva gives birth to twin girls (Oddny and Ludmilla), a son, Harald, and later to another son (though possibly from Rainald, a guesting priest), Svarthöfde (Blackhair in the Michael Meyer translation). Meanwhile, Orm also gets busy in converting the heathens in the district, with the help of Father Willibald.

The year 1000 passes without Christ returning. In 1007, with Orm now forty-two, his brother Are returns from the east after serving the Byzantine Empire, bringing the news of a treasure ("the Bulgar gold") he had hidden. Orm decides to travel to the Dnieper weirs in Kievan Rus for the gold, and together with Toke and the Finnveding chieftain Olof mans a ship. They recover the treasure and return home safely. But on their return they encounter an unexpected crisis at home: Rainald, the rather ridiculous failed German Christian missionary, had become a renegade, turned into a Pagan priest of the old Norse gods and the leader of a formidable band of robbers and outlaws, and causes great havoc before being finally overcome. Following this final crisis and from then on, Orm and Toke live in peace and plenty as good neighbours, and Svarthöfde Ormsson becomes a famous Viking, fighting for Canute the Great. The story ends with the statement that Orm and Toke in their old age "did never tire of telling of the years when they had rowed the Caliph's ship and served my lord Al-Mansur."

== Writing process ==
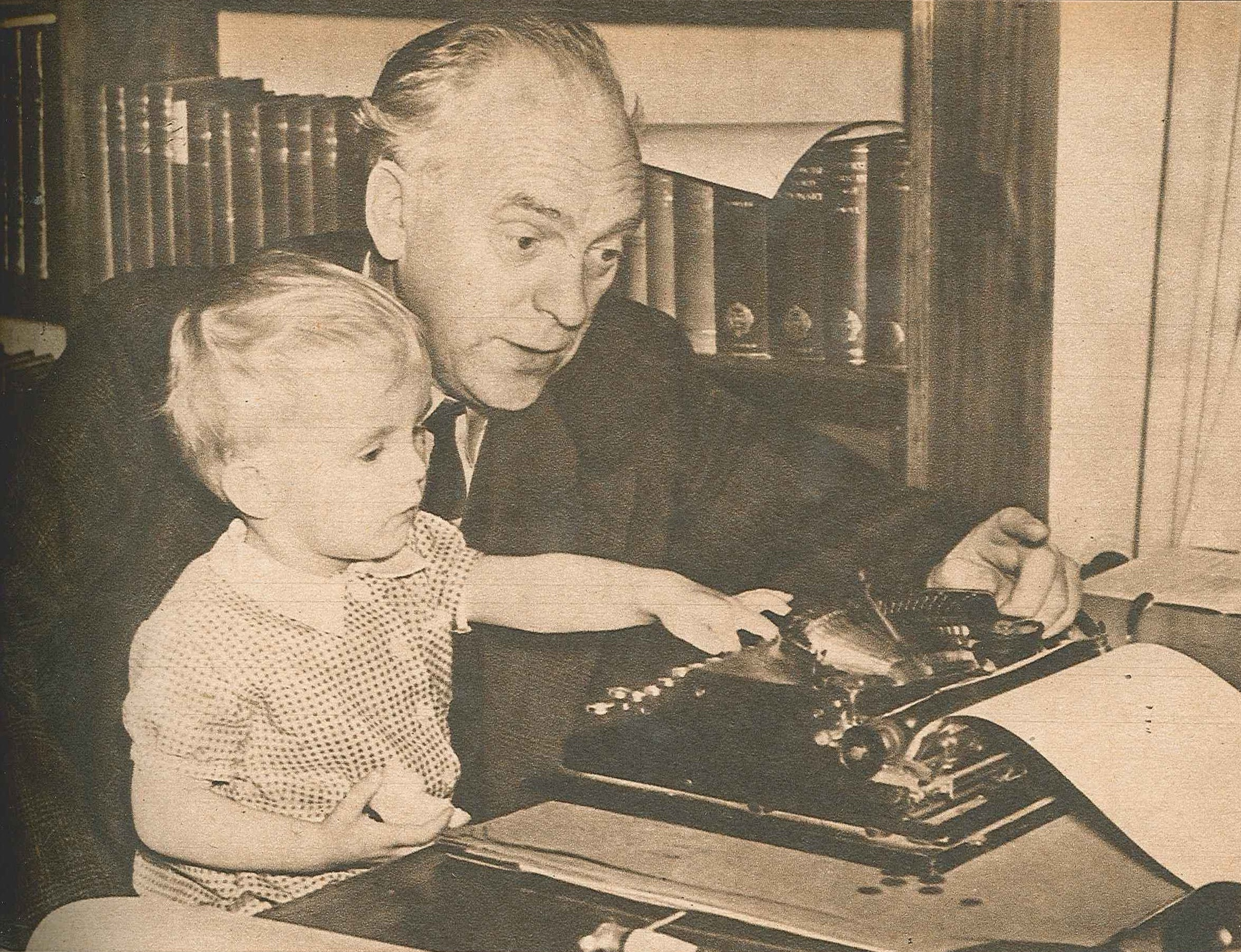
Frans G. Bengtsson in 1943

The Swedish writer Sven Stolpe reports that somebody asked author Frans G. Bengtsson "what intentions he had with The Long Ships", to which Bengtsson responded that he had no particular intentions. "I just wanted to write a story that people could enjoy reading, like The Three Musketeers or the Odyssey."

The research for the book was based largely on Snorri Sturluson's Heimskringla and other old Icelandic literature, but also on medieval chronicles and contemporary research, and historic names, people and events were woven into the fiction. The language of the novel is modelled on the Icelandic sagas. Early in his career, Bengtsson had held a romantic view on the saga literature, promoting an elevated, almost sacral prose in translations, but when writing The Long Ships he instead made use of the saga's faculties for wisecracks and comic understatements. The main characters were written as likable anti-heroes, far from the romantic view of Vikings. Like the sagas, the book relies on verbs and nouns to drive the narrative, with only a minimum of adjectives and descriptive passages. In essays, Bengtsson expresses disgust with "psychological realism" in the literature of his day where the thoughts and feelings of the characters are discussed explicitly rather than indicated by actions and outward signs. In the Swedish original of The Longships, the grammar is deliberately slightly archaic.

Joan Klein noted that "Within the 10th Century plot, the book's Viking protagonists never heard of Jews, and have a completely open mind about them—and when encountering a Jew who allies with the Vikings and leads them to treasure beyond their dreams, they are duly grateful (...). However, one can hardly overlook the fact that the book was actually written in a very specific part of the 20th Century—during the Second World War, a time when Nazi Germany was involved in a horrific persecution and massacre of Jews, while the Nazis claimed the Viking heritage for their monstrous version of German and Germanic Nationalism. Bengtsson in effect throws the Viking heritage back in the Nazis' face".

== Adaptations ==
The 1964 British–Yugoslav film The Long Ships (starring Richard Widmark and Sidney Poitier) very loosely based on the book, retaining little more than the title (of the English translation) and the Moorish settings. In the 1980s, there were plans for a large-scale Swedish screen adaptation. The film was supposed to be directed by Hans Alfredson and star Stellan Skarsgård as Orm and Sverre Anker Ousdal as Toke. The project was cancelled for financial reasons, but Alfredson's script was reworked into radio theatre which was broadcast in 1990.

Röde Orm, a comic adaptation by Charlie Christensen, was published in four albums from 1999 to 2004, covering the first book in the series.

Swedish author Mikael Westlund published his debut novel Svarthöfde in 2002, which expands on the brief summary at the end of The Long Ships, giving the further adventures of Orm's son Svarthöfde (Blackhair) and the sons of Sone. As with Bengtsson's novel the language has an archaic flavor, leavened with humor, and several historical figures appear.

In 2011 the Swedish production company Fladen Film announced they had acquired the film rights for the book, and that an adaptation was under development.

In May 2014, during the press conference of Swedish film company Film i Väst at the 2014 Cannes Film Festival, Danish film producer Peter Aalbæk Jensen, from the Danish film company Zentropa, founded by Lars von Trier, said that he was going to produce an adaptation of the novel. Aalbæk said that he had Stellan Skarsgård in mind as playing the old Röde Orm and his acting sons Alexander, Gustaf, Bill and Valter playing Röde Orm at various stages in his life. This adaptation is planned to be split into two films and also as a TV-series in four parts. Hans Petter Moland from Norway will be directing. Stellan Skarsgård has expressed interest in acting in the film if the script is good. Filming was expected to start in Västra Götaland in 2016, however Film i Väst decided to end their collaboration with Aalbæk and the film project was cancelled.

In 2017, the Royal Danish Theatre made a screenplay based on The Long Ships, to be played not in the theater, but atop the recently built Moesgård Museum. The play was held atop a giant constructed wooden stage resembling a crashed Viking ship with a dragon's head and was based on the second part of Bengtsson's book, after Røde Orm returns to Denmark with the bell. The play was directed by Henrik Szklany with Andreas Jebro playing Röde Orm (Røde Orm in Danish). In 2018 the show was brought to Ulvedalene in Dyrehaven park.

In 2020, Royal Dramatic Theatre presented an adaptation of Röde Orm featuring Emma Broomé as Orm, Lennart Jähkel as both Krok and king Harald and Karin Franz Körlof as Ylva. Though awarded with rave reviews, the production was cancelled early due to COVID-19.

== See also ==
- Trade route from the Varangians to the Greeks

== Editions ==
- Norstedts (1983), ISBN 91-1-791702-6.

English translations

- Red Orm, Barrows Mussey (trans.), C. Scribner's sons (1943).
- The Long Ships : A Saga of the Viking Age, Random House (1954).
- The Long Ships, Michael Meyer (trans.), Collins (1954), HarperCollins (1984), ISBN 0-00-612609-X.
