= Arne Anka =

Swedish comic strip

Arne Anka in Stureplan, Stockholm.

Arne Anka is a Swedish comic strip drawn by Charlie Christensen from 1983 to 1995 and 2006 and forward. The title character is inspired by Donald Duck (who is called Kalle Anka in Swedish). The likeness with Donald Duck is only feather deep, however; the comics often take place at a bar, Zeke's, where Arne gets drunk while he cynically thinks about and discusses life. This usually happens in the company of his friend, Krille Krokodil ("Krille Crocodile"). In other situations, Arne is found walking, with friends or alone, and occasionally he is found in a completely different setting (albeit with the same group of friends), like ancient Rome or 18th century Paris. Always, however, he comments on life and (especially Swedish) society with sharp wit.

Some distinct features about Arne Anka are his deep love for Swedish poetry and literature, his miserable financial situation, his excessive consumption of alcohol, and his enthusiasm towards women - even though he has very little luck with any such connections.

Charlie Christensen uses his friends as inspiration for the characters and stories in Arne Anka. One of his friends has said that you sometimes notice that Charlie Christensen gets a particular look and then a few weeks later you read what you just said in an Arne Anka strip.

In 1997, a few pages were translated to English in connection with an exhibition of Nordic comics in France, and the publication of an English-language anthology. In this translation, the character was given the name "Arnie the Duck".

For Joachim Trier's 2021 Norwegian film The Worst Person in the World, Charlie Christensen was hired to do the comic "Gaupe" (roughly "Lynxie") in an Arne Anka-inspired style.

== Disney lawsuit threat ==
In 1990, the Nordic division of the Walt Disney Company ordered Christensen's publisher to cease and desist all publication of Arne Anka, due to the character's resemblance to Donald Duck, and threatened to sue if they didn't. To get around this, Christensen came up with a two-part plan; first, he had Arne undergo plastic surgery to have his beak reshaped so that he no longer looked like a duck, and changed his name to Arne X. Then, after almost a year of hearing other characters (and some readers) tell him that he looked better before, Arne buys a fake duck beak to wear over his altered beak so he can look like his former self, reasoning that he could always remove the false beak if any of Disney's lawyers confronted him. Thus, with the exception of a thin line on the back of his head to represent the elastic band holding his new beak on, his appearance was the same as before.

As a result of all this, the character's popularity soared, as the readers saw him as a hero for standing up to an enormous American corporation; Arne became a symbol of Swedish pride and defiance.

== Theater play ==
In 1995, Arne Anka was produced as a play at Stockholm City Theatre (Stockholms Stadsteater). The play was written by Christensen himself, and it was called "Arne Anka - en afton på Zekes" ("Arne Anka - an evening at Zeke's"), starring Robert Gustafsson as Arne.

== Albums ==
- Arne Anka, Tago 1989
  - ISBN 91-86540-30-0
- Arne Anka, Del II, Tago 1991
  - ISBN 91-86540-43-2
- Arne Anka, Del III, Tago 1993
  - ISBN 91-86540-55-6
- Arne Anka, Bombad och sänkt" (Bombed and Sunk), Autobiography, Tago 1993
  - ISBN 91-86540-60-2
- Arne Anka, Del IV, Tago 1995
  - ISBN 91-86540-78-5
- Jag, Arne (Me, Arne) (collected comics 1983-1995), (hardcover), Tago, 1997
  - ISBN 91-88966-21-6
- Jag, Arne (Me, Arne) (collected comics 1983-1995), (softcover), Kartago, 2001
  - ISBN 91-89632-01-X
- Arne Anka, Del V: Återuppståndelsen (The resurrection), Kartago 2006
  - ISBN 91-89632-68-0
- Arne Anka, Del VI: Manöver i mörkret (Maneuver in the dark), Kartago 2007
  - ISBN 978-91-89632-81-3
- Arne Anka, Del VII: Ner med monarkin (Down with the Monarchy), Kartago 2008
  - ISBN 978-91-86003-08-1
- Arne Anka: Rapport från kriget (Report from the war), Kartago 2010
  - ISBN 978-91-86003-56-2
- Arne Anka IX - Voodoo vid vatten (Voodoo by the water), Kartago 2011
  - ISBN 978-91-86003-81-4
- Arne Anka X - Utsikt från en svamp (View from a mushroom), Kartago 2013
  - ISBN 978-91-75150-25-3
- Arne Anka XI - Dagbok från Svitjod (Diary from Svitjod), Kartago 2014
  - ISBN 978-91-75150-71-0
- Arne Anka XII - Mentala selfies (Mental selfies), Kartago 2016
  - ISBN 978-91-75151-39-7
- " Arne Anka XIII - Alla dessa krig talar om oss själva (All These Wars talk About Ourselves)", Zeke´s Förlag 2022
  - ISBN 978-84-125450-0-5
- "All These Wars talk About Ourselves)", Zeke´s Förlag 2023
  - ISBN 978-84-125450-1-2

== See also ==
- Röde Orm, another comic by Christensen
- The Disneyland Memorial Orgy
- Air Pirates
