= Assar (comic strip) =

Comic strip by Ulf Lundkvist

Assar is a comic strip by the Swedish cartoonist Ulf Lundkvist. The strip is about the hot dog Assar and other figures in the fictional Swedish town of Nollberga. The strip was published daily in the newspaper Dagens Nyheter from 1990 to 2012. The strip, which is regularly published in black and white, has also been published in about twenty collection albums.

== Characters ==
- Assar - the living hot dog
- Razor - the embodiment of meanness, a short, unkempt, sharp-toothed apparition
- Bimbo - Nollberga's superhero, whose secret identity is the shy nerd "Tyrone"
- Rymd-Börje - an outerspace alien come to visit
- Baron Bosse - the only truly evil inhabitant of Nollberga (Razor is mean but not evil)
- Pelle Pälsänger

== Description ==
=== Nollberga ===
The central character of the strip is a talking hot dog. In the beginning of the strip he escaped from a hot dog stand and moved to Nollberga. Nollberga is a little town somewhere in Sweden with cramped inhabitants who live in cultural misery and where the majority of the houses - as well as the food - consists of the poor-quality material "botong", a kind of milky concrete mixture invented by Baron Bosse.

=== Characters and their relations ===
Even though the series is named after the character Assar, nowadays he no longer is very often in the centre of the action. Instead many events are centred around Tyrone, who is usually viewed as a nerd. He often works at the Nollberga homestead farm, but he has a secret identity as Bimbo, the crime fighter who has sworn a rutabaga oath at his parents' grave. One of Bimbo's enemies is Razor, a furry creature often seen stealing gooseberry drinks from the grocer Andersson. Razor is often seen mumbling phrases such as Bryna nuppa fjässa sponken to himself.

Andersson's daughter Flora was once in a relationship with Tyrone, and they had a son called Brynar, who resembled Razor more than Tyrone. Before this, Flora had been in numerous relationships, including the dog Hybris, Mr. Kantarell and the menhir Roffe. She often cooks a messy stew dish for her boyfriends that has to ripen for several days before it is ready to be served. At one time Flora's son Brynar travelled throughout America and acted in a silent version of the film Barnen från Frostmofjället together with Sylvester Stallone.

Nollberga is a monarchy governed by the king Royne. He lives in the castle "Royneborg" and often helps his subjects with their fertilizer spreaders by crawling into them. At one time king Royne was in a relationship with Pamela Anderson. He was once replaced by king Viggo, who mostly used his royal title to win the Swedish Melodifestivalen competition.

=== Bosse and others ===
One of the strip's main villains is Baron Bosse, also called BB, an evil baron who was originally shown transformed into a cat. Baron Bosse has evil business plans and has invented the material "botong" as well as the food "Nutsy". Botong can be used both as a building material and as food, but is not really suitable for either. Baron Bosse disappeared after an airfight with his archenemy Ebbe von Stalheim, summoned by Bimbo's rutabaga ghost to beat BB and botong (as well as BB's poetry). Baron Bosse often cooperates with Elof Öman, the head of the record and TV industry in Nollberga, who is often seen at the restaurant Lilla Fina Feta Vita Voffsingen, later known as Döda Hunden.

Other characters in the strip include the adventurer Explorer Johansson, who sails the seven seas, and the outerspace alien Rymdbörje, who occasionally visits Nollberga and helps Assar with his problems. He likes to play the card game Happy families.

== Publication history ==
=== Newspapers ===
The strip started as a daily comic strip in the newspaper Dagens Nyheter on 1 February 1990. It was published from Monday to Saturday with a break from 3 April to 27 July 1991, as well on Sundays in a different format from 27 June 1993, until 31 December 2012. From 2004 to 2005 it was also published in the short-lived (four issues) comics magazine Etc Comics. The thicker magazine Assar-häfte with 118 reprinted strips from 1990 was published in 2008, lasting only a single issue.

=== Books ===
Collections of Assar strips from Dagens Nyheter have later been published as albums, and the special Sunday strips have also been published as a separate album.

The first four albums were published by Tago/Atlantic. From 1995 to 1997 Dagens Nyheter published three albums with daily strips as well as two collections of Sunday strips. Dagens Nyheter stopped publishing the albums after this but continued printing the strip in the newspaper. In 2005 the new company Nisses Böcker led by Nisse Larsson, an employee and comics editor from Dagens Nyheter, started publishing Assar albums again. The company published albums 7 through 17 in up to 2012, as well as Assars kokbok ("Assar's cookbook") in 2007, which is not strictly speaking a comics album.

The four Tago/Atlantic albums were 132 to 144 pages, while the five albums from Dagens Nyheter were 64 pages in colour. Nisses Böcker's albums were 104 to 124 pages. The 2011 special edition Assar till tusen collected the 1000 first strips of the comic, with a total length of 372 pages.
