= Ulf Lundkvist =

Swedish artist

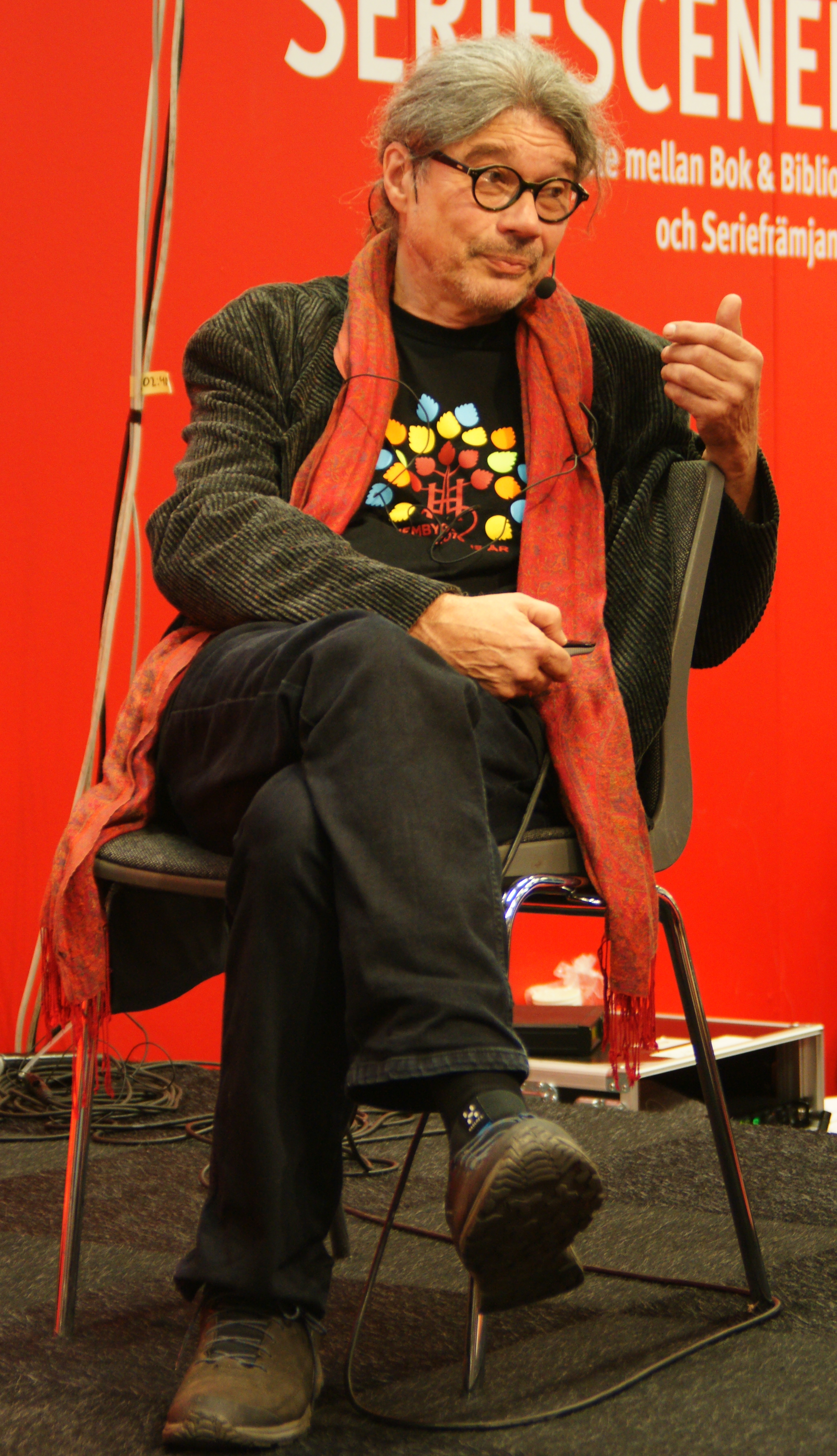
Ulf Lundkvist

Ulf Lundkvist (born 1952) is a Swedish comic creator, illustrator, and painter. A nostalgia buff in love with the 1940s, 1950s, and 1960s, Lundkvist depicts the "old Sweden" with humor and affection, small towns and countryside and anachronistic places where time seems to stand still.

Lundkvist's most famous comic is probably the strip Assar, an absurd story about a hot dog who gains sentience and escapes his fate to seek adventure.
