= Claes Reimerthi =

Swedish comic book author (1955–2021)

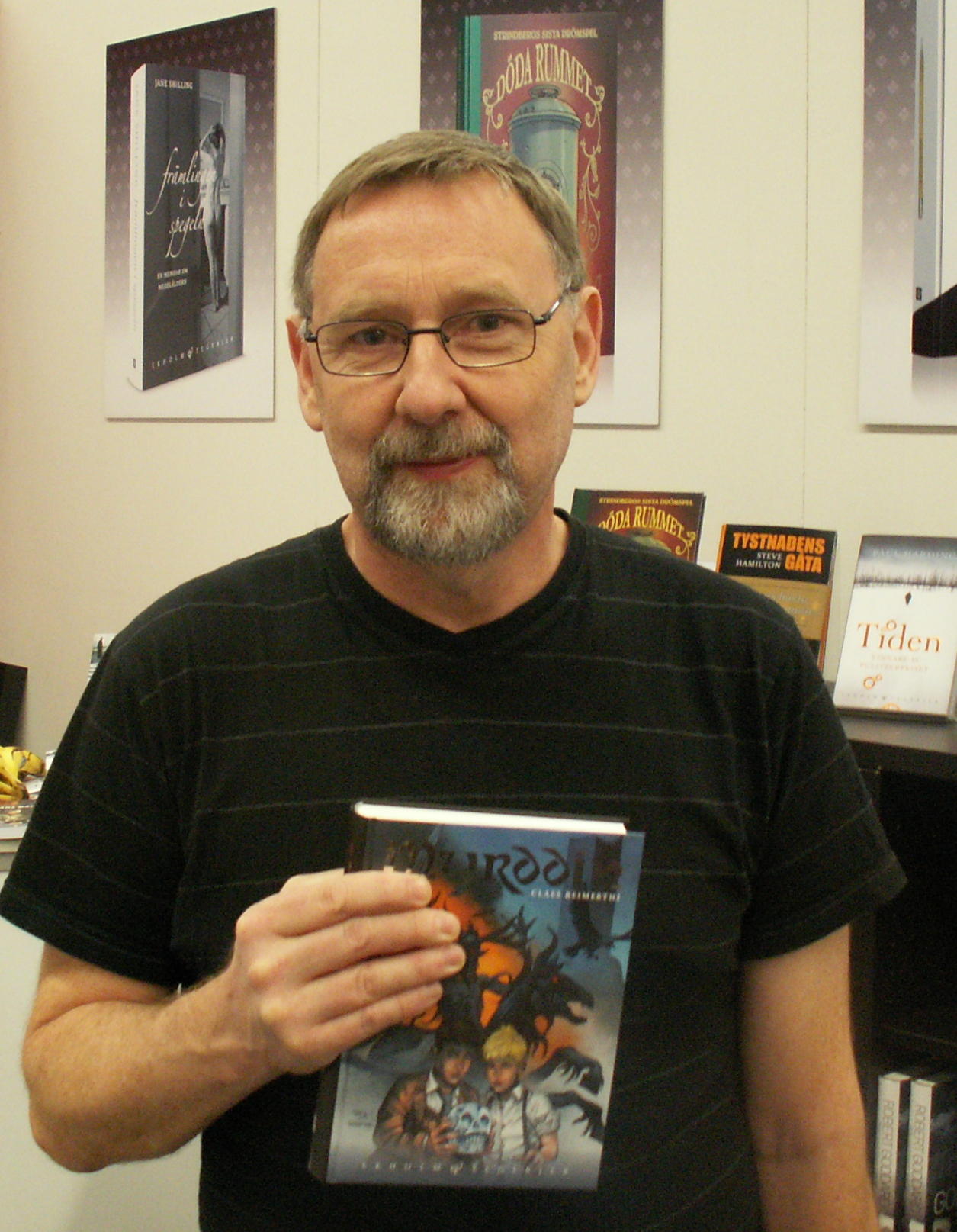
- Reimerthi in 2012
- Born: 12 January 1955; Ystad, Sweden
- Died: 23 July 2021 (aged 66); Ystad, Sweden
- Occupation: Comic book author

Claes Göran Reimerthi (12 January 1955 – 23 July 2021) was a Swedish comic book author. He was most well known for his Swedish language version of The Phantom, known as Fantomen.

== Awards ==
- Adamson Award for Best Swedish Comic-Strip Cartoonist (2001; co-won with Hans Lindahl)
- Urhunden Prize (2015)
