= Åsa Ekström =

Swedish comics artist

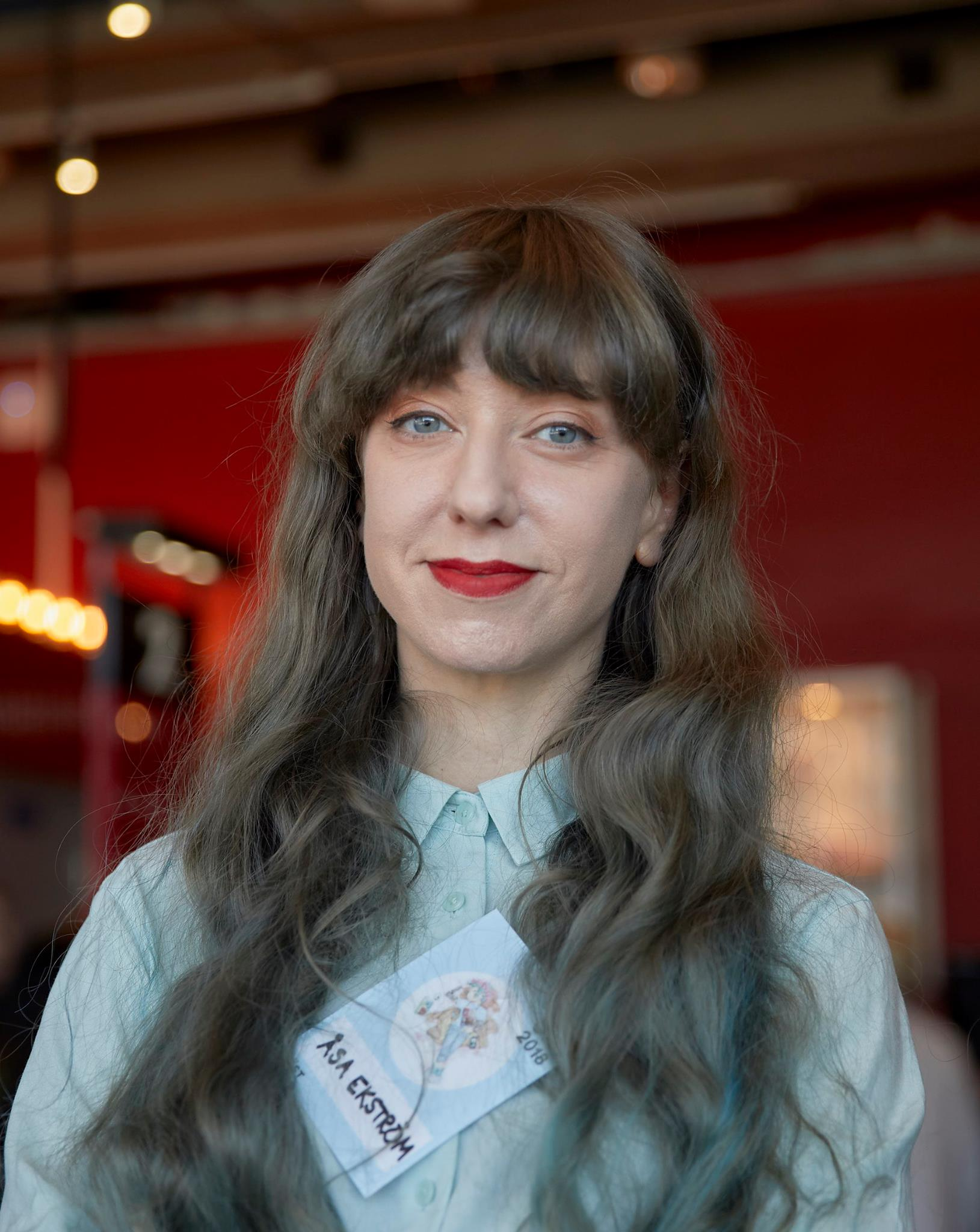
- Åsa Ekström, at the 2018 Stockholm International Comics Festival.
- Born: Karlskrona, Blekinge, Sweden
- Areas: Cartoonist, Writer
- Notable works: Stall Norrsken; Sayonara September; Nordic Girl Åsa discovers the Mysteries of Japan

Åsa Ekström is a Swedish comics artist, currently residing and working as a manga creator in Sweden and Japan.

== Life and career ==
Ekström was born in Karlskrona, Blekinge in 1983 according to her CV on her official website, while stating that she was born in Stockholm in her work. She developed her interest in Anime and Manga at the age of 13 after watching Sailor Moon first. After that, she has read Ranma ½, Inuyasha, One Piece, and The Rose of Versailles in her middle school ages. She studied and graduated from Serieskolan i Malmö in 2005.

After graduating, Ekström started her freelanced illustrating for several books, including Namnsdagsflickan by Kristoffer Leandoer, Stall Norrsken by Noomi Hebert and Lena Ollmark.

In 2004, Ekström published her debut work Tokyo by Night through Manga Mania and quickly received local attention. In 2008, she published her first manga work, Sayonara September , with 7,000 copies. In 2010, Ekström was a designer in IKEA.

Ekström first visited Japan in 2003. She then studied in Japan and spent nine months there in 2007. On 10 March, 2011, Ekström visited Japan for the seventh time and considered residing there. However, she returned to Sweden due to the 2011 Tōhoku earthquake and tsunami on the next day before she returned to Japan several months later.

Started in 2013, Ekström established her blog on Blogspot, then Ameba in 2014, recording her life in Japan and experience of learning Japanese language in a Yonkoma format. The blog quickly gained attention after its establishment: in 2015, it became the most visited blog overall on Ameba. In the same year, Ekström published her debut work in Japan, Nordic Girl Åsa discovers the Mysteries of Japan, with the combination of her works on the blog thought Media Factory of Kadokawa. It had a publishing run of 110,000 copies and was translated into Traditional Chinese in 2016.

Sayonara September was also translated into Japanese by CREEK & RIVER, which was awarded Gaiman Award in 2015.

On 9 July 2021, Ekström announced on her blog that she had married a Japanese and was pregnant. She later tweeted that she gave birth to a boy on 10 October 2021. Ekström mentioned in her column on The Asahi Shimbun that she moved to Sweden on 7 December 2024 with her 3-year-old son and 1-year-old daughter.

== Works ==
According to Kadokawa's works:

- Sayonara September (Swedish: Sayonara September, Japanese: さよならセプテンバー)
- Nordic Girl Åsa discovers the Mysteries of Japan (Japanese: 北欧女子オーサが見つけた日本の不思議, Chinese: 北歐女孩日本生活好吃驚, Swedish: Mitt live i Japan)
- 北欧女子オーサのニッポン再発見ローカル旅
- 北欧女子オーサ日本を学ぶ
- 北欧女子オーサ、日本で恋をする。
