= Måns Gahrton =

Swedish author

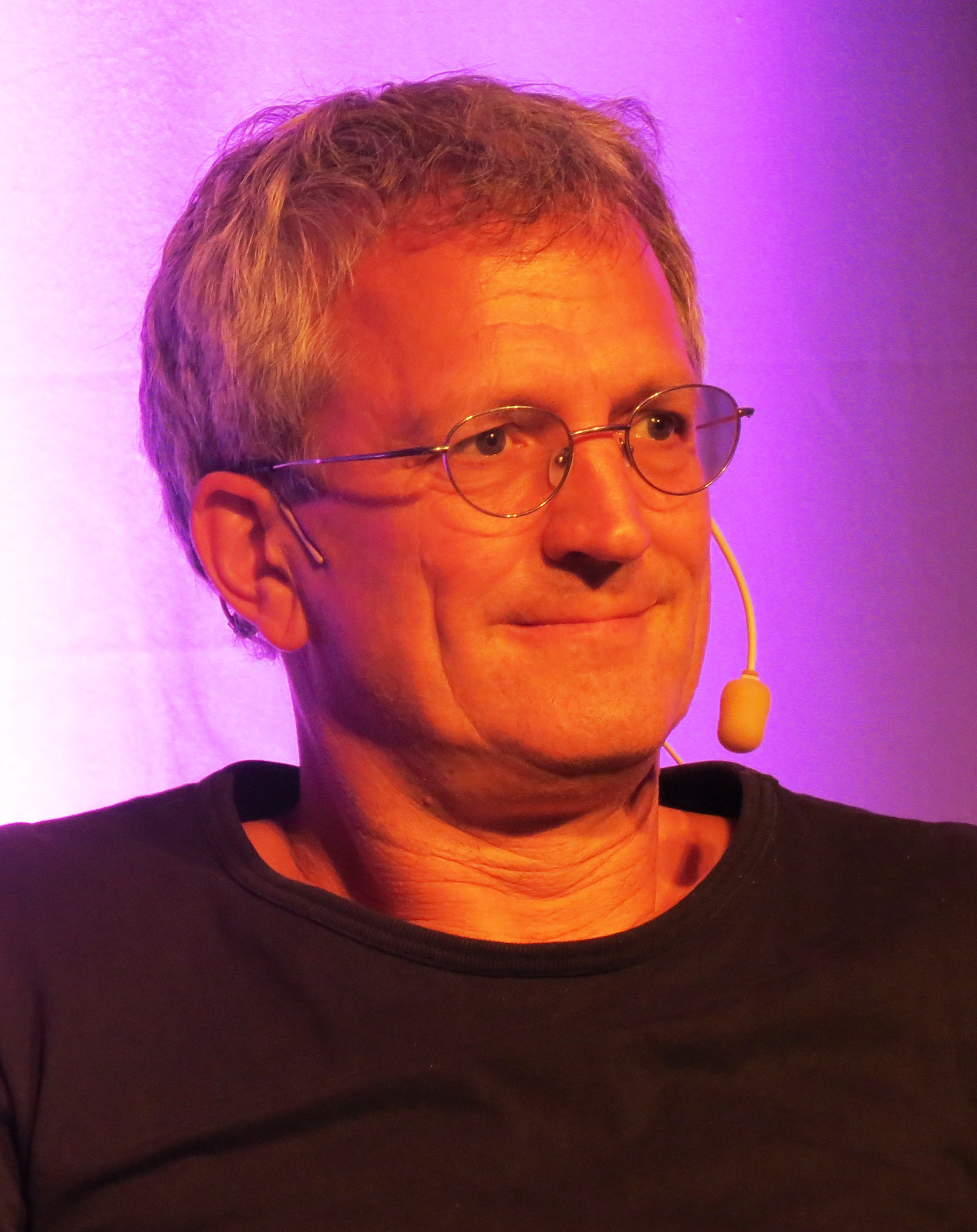
Måns Gahrton

Måns Gahrton (born 1961) is a Swedish author.

Gahrton was born in Lund, Skåne County. He wrote his first book when he was 6 years old. He is best known for his books about Eva & Adam, Agent Annorlunda and the Bert comics. The artwork is provided by Johan Unenge.
