= Jesper Svensson =

Jesper Svensson may refer to:

- Jesper Svensson (footballer) (born 1990), Swedish footballer
- Jesper Svensson (bowler) (born 1995), Swedish ten-pin bowler
- Jesper Svensson (golfer) (born 1996), Swedish golfer
