= FF med Bert =

Publication information
- Publisher: Semic Press (1993-1997); Egmont Serieförlaget (1998-2002)
- Schedule: monthly (1993-1998) bimonthly (1999-2002)
- Format: cancelled
- Publication date: 1993-2002
- No. of issues: 85
- Main character(s): Bert

FF med Bert (Föräldrafritt med Bert, FF, Berttidningen), was a Swedish comic book published between the years of 1993 and 2002. The main comics, Berts dagbok, were created by Johan Unenge and Måns Gahrton, and are based on the Bert Diaries by Anders Jacobsson and Sören Olsson. Bert Ljung's look is similar to that in the books. Even comic albums were published. In the year 2000 the title was shortened to Bert, and the number of comics increased. Bert Ljung debuted as a comic character in 1993, as a guest comic in the Fantomen (Phantom) comic book.

Even other comics did guest appearances. Except for comics, reports aimed at young people (like interviews with sportspeople or pop and rock stars) were published.
