= Kamratposten =

Swedish children's magazine

- Categories: Children's magazine; Comics magazine
- Frequency: Irregular
- Publisher: Bonnier Tidskrifter AB
- Founder: Stina Quint
- Founded: 1892
- Company: Bonnier Group
- Country: Sweden
- Based in: Stockholm
- Language: Swedish
- Website: Kamratposten

Kamratposten, also styled as KP, (Swedish: The Friend-Post) is a Swedish children's magazine published in Stockholm, Sweden. Founded in 1892, it is one of the earliest children's magazines in the country.

== History and profile ==
The magazine was established by Stina Quint in 1892 under the name Folkskolans barntidning (Swedish: Elementary School's Children's Magazine). It was published with that name until 1950. The magazine has been part of the Bonnier Group since its start in 1892. The publisher is Bonnier Tidskrifter based in Stockholm. It targets children between the ages of 8 and 14.

The editor-in-chief of KP is Lukas Björkman. Ola Lindholm also served in the post until September 2011 when he left the post due to his involvement in a cocaine use case.

The website of KP was launched on 1 September 2007. As of 2012, the magazine was published once or twice per month.

KP is the 2013 recipient of the grand prize of the Swedish Magazine Publishers Association.

Eva & Adam
- Author(s): Måns Gahrton
- Illustrator(s): Johan Unenge
- Launch date: 1990
- End date: 1993

== Eva & Adam ==
Eva & Adam is a Swedish series of comics and books, started in 1990 by Johan Unenge and Måns Gahrton, primarily themed around romance and relationships. Set in present Sweden at school, the main characters are named after Adam and Eve in the Old Testament. The comic strip was published in KP between 1990 and 1993. The first comic album was released in 1993. Apart from comics, there has also been twelve books published, and two TV-series and a movie.
