= Frans G. Bengtsson =

Swedish novelist, essayist, poet and biographer (1894–1954)

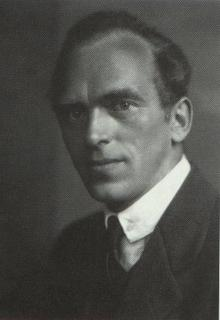
- Born: Frans Gunnar Bengtsson; 4 October 1894 Ängelholm Municipality, Sweden
- Died: 19 December 1954 (aged 60) Sweden
- Occupation: Novelist
- Genre: Fiction

Frans Gunnar Bengtsson (4 October 1894 – 19 December 1954) was a Swedish novelist, essayist, poet and biographer. He was born in Tåssjö (now in Ängelholm Municipality) in Scania and died at Ribbingsfors Manor in northern Västergötland.

== Literary career ==
Bengtsson began as a poet, with his debut work Tärningkast (Throwing Dice) published in 1923. In 1929, he published his first essay collection titled Litteratörer och Militärer (Writers and Warriors) with contributions on François Villon, Walter Scott, Joseph Conrad, and Stonewall Jackson; he would publish four more collections during the rest of his career. His essays mainly dealt with literary and historical subjects. A selection was translated into English in 1950 and published as A Walk to an Ant Hill and Other Essays.

His biography on the Swedish king Charles XII (Karl XII:s levnad) 1932 is his magnum opus. He describes the king through excerpts from contemporary diaries by officers and common soldiers, and from a wealth of quotes from the published literature. Bengtsson's work draws heavily on the biography of Charles XII by Voltaire published in 1731, thirteen years after the king’s death.

Later, Bengtsson became widely known for his Viking saga novel Röde Orm (The Long Ships), published in two parts in 1941 and 1945. The hero Orm, later called Röde Orm (Red Snake) because of his red beard, is kidnapped as a boy onto a raiding ship and leads an exciting life in the Mediterranean area around the year AD 1000. Later, he makes an expedition eastward into Gardarike. The Long Ships was later adapted into a film. The novel was the inspiration for the name of the wireless technology Bluetooth.

Bengtsson once said: "Joan of Arc, Charles XII, and Garibaldi are the persons I would like to meet - for them the truth was more important than intrigues."

== Personal life ==
Bengtsson studied at the University of Lund from 1912, but spent a lot of his time writing poetry and playing chess rather than studying. He graduated with a licentiate degree in English literature in 1930. Bengtsson married Gerda Fineman in 1939 and the couple had a son.
