= Seriefrämjandet =

Swedish comics society

Seriefrämjandet (literally the promotion of comics, but internationally, the name The Swedish Comics Association is generally used) is a Swedish association for everybody with an interest in comics, founded in 1968 by Henri Holmgren, Janne Lundström and Sture Hegerfors. The association acts to promote the status of the medium as a means of expression, and to increase the knowledge of the characteristics of the medium. With government funding, Seriefrämjandet has started Svenskt Seriearkiv, an archive devoted to preservering and documenting the history of the Swedish comics business. In 2005, Seriefrämjandet opened Seriecenter (literally Comics Centre) in Malmö, with offices, exhibition space and small studio for creators. The association also has local chapters in several major cities.

The association produces Bild & Bubbla (literally Image & Balloon), a quarterly magazine about comics aimed at both creators and fans. Seriefrämjandet also publishes books about comics, and even an own imprint of comics set in a rural environment, "Lantis".

Since 1987, Seriefrämjandet presents an annual award, the Urhunden Prizes, to one Swedish and one foreign work of art.

Since the summer of 2005, Seriefrämjandet runs Seriewikin, a Swedish language wiki about comics.

Seriefrämjandet's current chairman is Fredrik Strömberg, who is also a well-respected journalist specializing in comics, published both domestically and internationally.

== See also ==
- Adamson Awards
