= Adamson Awards =

Swedish comic-strip award

- Awarded for: Achievements in comics
- Venue: Gothenburg Book Fair
- Country: Sweden
- Presented by: Swedish Academy of Comic Art
- First award: 1965
- Website: serieakademin.se/awards

Adamson Awards is a Swedish award awarded to notable cartoonists, named after the famous Swedish comic strip "Adamson" (Silent Sam). There are two award categories: International and Swedish cartoonist.

They have been presented by the Swedish Academy of Comic Art (SACA) since 1965. There have been years in that time when neither award or only one of the two awards was presented.

== Best International Comic-Strip [or comic book] Cartoonist ==
- 1965 – Chester Gould, USA; Dick Tracy
- 1966 – Harvey Kurtzman, USA; Djungelboken; skapare av Mad (The Jungle Book; creator of Mad)
- 1967 – Charles M. Schulz, USA; Snobben (Peanuts)
- 1968 – Jean-Claude Forest, France; Barbarella
- 1969 – Harold R. Foster, USA; Prins Valiant (Prince Valiant)
- 1970 – Robert Crumb, USA; Fritz the Cat, etc.
- 1971 – Hergé (Georges Remi), Belgium; The Adventures of Tintin
- 1972 – Guido Crepax, Italy; Valentina, etc.
- 1974 – René Goscinny, France; Asterix, Lucky Luke, etc.
- 1975 – Mort Walker, USA; "Knasen" (Beetle Bailey) and Sams serie (Sam's Strip) etc.
- 1976 – Johnny Hart, USA; B.C.
- 1977 – Lee Falk, USA; Mandrake and Fantomen (Mandrake and The Phantom)
- 1979 – Moebius (Jean Giraud), France; Blueberry, etc.
- 1980 – André Franquin, Belgium; Spirou et Fantasio and Gaston
- 1981 - Gérard Lauzier, France; Sånt är livet (Tranches de vie) etc.
- 1983 - Caza (Philippe Cazaumayou), France; Mardrömmarnas stad (Scènes de la vie de banlieue), etc.
- 1985 (The Swedish Academy of Comic Art 20th Year Celebration) (tie):
  - Brant Parker, USA; Trollkarlen from Id (The Wizard of Id);
  - Jerry Dumas, USA; Sams serie and Sam och Silo (Sam's Strip and Sam and Silo)
  - Sergio Aragonés; USA; Groo, etc.;
  - Burne Hogarth, USA; Tarzan;
  - Jerry Siegel, USA; Superman
- 1986 – Jacques Tardi, France; Adéle Blanc-Sec, etc.
- 1987 – Claire Bretécher, France; De frustrerade (Frustrés)
- 1988 – Art Spiegelman, USA; Maus
- 1989 – (tie):
  - Bud Grace, USA; Ernie
  - Don Martin, USA; strips from Mad
- 1990 – Frank Miller, USA; recreation of Batman and Daredevil
- 1991 – Bill Watterson, USA; Kalle and Hobbe (Calvin and Hobbes)
- 1992 – Bill Sienkiewicz, USA; Daredevil, and graphic experiments
- 1993 – Neil Gaiman, England; The Sandman, etc.
- 1994 – Scott McCloud, USA; Understanding Comics
- 1995 – Scott Adams, USA; Herbert and Herbert (Dilbert)
- 1996 – Jeff Smith, USA; Bone
- 1997 – Patrick McDonnell, USA; Morrgan och Klös (Mutts)
- 1998 – Don Rosa, USA; (Donald Duck)
- 1999 – Enki Bilal, France; (Nikopol)
- 2000 – Alan Moore, England; (Watchmen, Tom Strong)
- 2001 – Jim Meddick, USA; (Robotman/Monty)
- 2002 – tie:
  - Daniel Clowes, USA; (Ghost World)
  - Jerry Scott, USA; Baby Blues, Nancy, Zits
- 2003 – Chris Ware, USA; (Jimmy Corrigan, the Smartest Kid on Earth, The Acme Novelty Library)
- 2004 – Joe Sacco, USA; (Palestine)
- 2005 – Jim Borgman, USA; (Zits)
- 2006 – Frode Øverli, Norway; (Pondus)
- 2007 – Garry Trudeau, USA; Doonesbury
- 2008 – Charles Burns, USA; Black Hole
- 2009 – Jean Van Hamme, Philippe Francq, Belgium; Largo Winch
- 2010 – Peter Madsen, Denmark
- 2011 – Bill Willingham, USA;
- 2012 – Terry Moore
- 2013 – Alejandro Jodorowsky
- 2014 – Pierre Christin, Jean-Claude Mézières
- 2015 – Sussi Bech, Marjane Satrapi
- 2016 – David Mazzucchelli
- 2017 – Steffen Kverneland, Norway
- 2018 – Hermann, Belgium
- 2019 – Derib, Switzerland
- 2020 – Vacant
- 2021 – Vacant
- 2022 – François Bourgeon, France
- 2023 – Trina Robbins, USA
- 2024 – (tie):
  - Wendy Pini, USA;
  - Richard Pini, USA
- 2025 – Henk Kuijpers, Netherlands; Franka
- 2026 – Riad Sattouf, France; The Arab of the Future

== Best Swedish Comic-Strip [or comic book] Cartoonist ==
- 1965 – Rudolf Petersson; 91:an
- 1966 – Elov Persson; Kronblom and Agust and Lotta
- 1967 – Rit-Ola (Jan-Erik Garland); Biffen and Bananen
- 1968 – Jan Lööf; Felix
- 1969 – Rune Andréasson; Bamse
- 1970 – Torvald Gahlin; Klotjohan and Fredrik
- 1971 – Torsten Bjarre; Flygsoldat 113 Bom
- 1972 – Rolf Gohs; Mystiska 2:an
- 1975 – Nils Egerbrandt; Olli and 91:an
- 1976 – Gösta Gummesson; Åsa-Nisse
- 1981 – Gunnar Persson; Kronblom
- 1983 – Ulf Lundkvist; Mannen med den långa håriga näsan in ETC
- 1986 – Joakim Pirinen; Socker-Conny etc.
- 1987 – Gunna Grähs; Evert and Tyra
- 1988 – Lars Hillersberg; 50-talet
- 1990 – Leif Zetterling; Nils Holgersson flyger igen
- 1991 – Lena Ackebo; strips in the publication Galago
- 1992 – Joakim Lindengren; strips in the publications Galago and Pyton
- 1993 – Charlie Christensen; Arne Anka
- 1994 – Gunnar Lundkvist; Klas Katt and Olle Ångest, etc.
- 1995 – Max Andersson; the volume Vakuumneger, etc.
- 1996 – Jan Romare; Pyton, Himlens Änglar, Ugglan Urban, etc.
- 1997 – Jan Berglin
- 1998 – Mats Källblad
- 1999 – Patrik Norrman
- 2000 – Monica Hellström; "Ärligt talat"
- 2001 – Claes Reimerthi & Hans Lindahl; Fantomen (The Phantom)
- 2002 – Lars Mortimer; "Hälge"
- 2003 – Martin Kellerman; "Rocky"
- 2004 – Tony Cronstam
- 2005 – David Nessle
- 2006 – Johan Wanloo
- 2007 – Nina Hemmingsson
- 2008 – Sven-Bertil Bärnarp
- 2009 – Ola Skogäng
- 2010 – Anneli Furmark
- 2011 – Kim W. Andersson, Lina Neidestam
- 2012 – Jonas Darnell, Liv Strömquist
- 2013 – Sara Granér
- 2014 – Daniel Ahlgren
- 2015 – Peter Bergting, Malin Biller
- 2016 – Knut Larsson, Ellen Ekman
- 2017 – Gert Lozell
- 2018 – Per Demervall
- 2019 – Krister Petersson
- 2020 – Vacant
- 2021 – Vacant
- 2022 – Joanna Rubin Dranger and Gunnar Krantz
- 2023 – Mats Jonsson
- 2024 – Lars Sjunnesson
- 2025 – Jan Gissberg
- 2026 – Lena Furberg

== Golden Adamson (for lifetime comic medium achievement) ==
- 1986 – Lee Falk, USA; (The Phantom, Mandrake the Magician)
- 1988 – Mort Walker, USA; (Beetle Bailey, Hi & Lois)
- 1990 – Carl Barks, USA; (Donald Duck)
- 1992 – Stan Lee, USA; (Fantastic Four, Spider-Man, Hulk)
- 1997 – Marten Toonder, Netherlands; (Tom Poes)
- 1998 – Will Eisner, USA; (The Spirit, various graphic novels)
- 2018 – Neal Adams, USA; (Man-Bat, various graphic novels)

== See also ==
- Urhunden Prizes (another Swedish comics award)
