= List of fictional towns in comics =

This is a list of fictional towns and villages in comics.

Name	Debut	Creator(s)	Publisher	Notes
Agarashima	X-Men #119 (February 1979)	Chris Claremont and John Byrne	Marvel Comics	Located in Japan, this is the hometown of the Yashida Clan, more precisely Mariko Yashida, the Japanese bride of Wolverine and her cousin, Shiro Yashida.
Argo City	Action Comics #252 (May 1959)		DC Comics	Fictional Kryptonian city in the DC Comics Universe, and the birthplace of Supergirl.
Astro City	Astro City #1 (August 1995)	Kurt Busiek and Brent Anderson	Image Comics; later Homage Comics and Vertigo Comics	Fictional American city that is the setting of the ongoing superhero series Astro City.
Beanotown	The Beano #604 (February 1954)		DC Thomson	Fictional town that is home to the characters of The Beano.
Blue Valley	The Flash #110 (December 1959) (first mentioned)	John Broome and Carmine Infantino	DC Comics	Fictional American city that is the hometown of Kid Flash, sidekick to the superhero the Flash.
Blüdhaven	Nightwing (vol. 2) #1 (October 1996).	Chuck Dixon and Scott McDaniel	DC Comics	Fictional American city that is the home of Nightwing.
Borricón de Arriba	Mort & Phil	Francisco Ibáñez	Ediciones B	Rural Spanish village that is Mort's birthplace.
Champignac	Spirou et Fantasio	André Franquin	Dupuis	Home town of Spirou and Fantasio. It is well known for its mayor and local count, who is also a mad scientist.
Citrusville	Adventure into Fear #11 (December 1972)	Steve Gerber	Marvel Comics	Fictional American town located in Cypress County, Florida; the location of the Nexus of Realities and its guardian, the Man-Thing.
The City	Transmetropolitan #1	Warren Ellis and Darick Robertson	DC Comics	Fictional megacity which forms the main setting for the Vertigo comic Transmetropolitan by Warren Ellis. Located somewhere in the United States, the City is the largest metropolitan area in the futuristic world of the series (an exact date is never given), and the center of political and social culture.
Central City	Showcase #4 (September–October 1956).	Robert Kanigher, John Broome, and Carmine Infantino	DC Comics	Fictional American city that is the home of the Silver Age Flash, Barry Allen.
Clerville	Diabolik	Angela and Luciana Giussani	Panini Comics	Fictional European city in a nation of the same name, the city in which the master thief Diabolik and his arch-nemesis Inspector Ginko reside.
Coast City	Showcase #22 (September–October 1959)	John Broome and Gil Kane	DC Comics	Fictional Californian city and home of the Silver Age version of the superhero Green Lantern, Hal Jordan.
Delta City	The Heckler #1 (September 1992)	Keith Giffen and Tom and Mary Bierbaum	DC Comics	Home of the superhero Heclker and the god of mishap Vext.
Dingburg	2007	Bill Griffith	Zippy the Pinhead	Hometown of Zippy the Pinhead, located seventeen miles west of Baltimore, Maryland.
Dogpatch	Li'l Abner	Al Capp	/	A hillbilly settlement in Kentucky that is the home of the title character and his friends.
Doomstadt	Fantastic Four (vol. 1) #5 (1962)	Stan Lee, Jack Kirby	Marvel Comics	Doomstadt is a capital city of a fictional country, Latveria, in the Marvel Comics universe. Its original name was Hassenstadt before Doctor Doom became dictator of the country.
Duckburg	Donald Duck	Carl Barks	Disney comics	Home town of Donald Duck.
Fawcett City	The Power of Shazam! (1994)	Jerry Ordway	DC Comics	Fictional American city that served as the home base of Captain Marvel and the Marvel Family during the 1990s and 2000s.
Fulchester	Viz (1979)	Chris Donald	Diamond Publishing	Fulchester is located in the North East England, near Newcastle upon Tyne, and is home to a number of run-down slums, as well as a university.
Fuxholzen	Fix und Foxi (1961)	Rolf Kauka	Rolf Kauka Comics	The home village of all of Kauka's characters.
Florespark	Isom	Eric July	Rippaverse Comics	Hometown of Avery Silman in Texas.
Greendale	Sabrina the Teenage Witch (2002)	George Gladir	Archie Comics	The main location of the comics of Sabrina, since the renaming and revamping of the series in 2002. The name itself was used first in Sabrina: The Animated Series, and it has been incorporated into other media and spin-off comics as Chilling Adventures of Sabrina.
Goosetown	Donald Duck	Carl Barks	Disney comics	The rival town of Duckburg.
Gotham City	Batman #4 (Winter 1940)	Bill Finger, Bob Kane	DC Comics	Fictional American city that is the home of Batman, and the principal setting for all Batman comics, films, and other adaptations. Generally portrayed as a dark, crime-ridden locale, writer/artist Frank Miller has described Gotham City as New York City at night. It was originally strongly inspired by Trenton, Ontario's history, location, atmosphere, and various architectural styles, and has since incorporated elements from New York City, Detroit, Pittsburgh, London and Chicago. Anton Furst's designs of Gotham City for Tim Burton's Batman (1989) have been influential on subsequent portrayals: he set out to "make Gotham City the ugliest and bleakest metropolis imaginable." Gotham City was also the home of the Golden Age Green Lantern, Alan Scott.
Hootin' Holler	Barney Google and Snuffy Smith	Billy DeBeck	/	Hootin' Holler is the home town of Snuffy Smith and his friends and relatives.
Hub City	Blue Beetle #1 (June 1967)	Steve Ditko	Charlton Comics; later DC Comics	Hub City is the birthplace of controversial investigative reporter, Victor Sage – also known as the Question in the DC Universe.
Junktown	Bucky Bug	Al Taliaferro	Disney comics	Home town of Bucky Bug.
Kandor	Action Comics #242 (July 1958)	Otto Binder and Al Plastino	DC Comics	Fictional city in the DC Universe and the first capital of the fictional planet Krypton. Prior to Krypton's destruction, the city was shrunken and placed in a bottle by Brainiac.
Keystone City	Flash Comics #1 (January 1940)		DC Comics	Fictional city in the DC Comics Universe. Specifically, it is the home of both the original Flash, Jay Garrick, and the third Flash, Wally West. Keystone City first appeared in the 1940s in the original Flash Comics series. Within the comics, Keystone has been described as being "the blue collar capital of the United States" and a center of industry.
Klow	The Adventures of Tintin	Hergé	Casterman	Fictional capital city of the fictional Kingdom of Syldavia, the home of King Muskar XII and his court in King Ottokar's Sceptre. Its former name was Zileheroum.
Kryptonopolis	Action Comics #242 (July 1958)		DC Comics	Fictional city in the DC Universe. Located on the planet Krypton, it is the second capital of Krypton and the birthplace of Superman.
Madripoor	New Mutants #32 (October 1985)	Chris Claremont and Steve Leialoha	Marvel Comics	Fictional principal city of a small southeast Asian country of the same name, similar to Singapore. It has an extreme divide between the wealthy and poor, and an extensive criminal underworld.
Maulwurfshausen	Fix und Foxi	Rolf Kauka	Rolf Kauka Comics	The home village of Pauli the mole.
Mega-City One	2000 AD #2 (March 5, 1977)	John Wagner		A huge fictional city-state covering much of what is now the Eastern United States in the Judge Dredd comic book series. The exact boundaries of the city depend on which artist has drawn the story. The city seems to have grown outward from the present-day Northeast megalopolis, extending to the Atlanta metropolitan area southwards, and the Quebec City-Windsor Corridor northwards.
Metropolis	Action Comics #16 (September 1939)		DC Comics	A fictional American city that is the home of Superman, and along with Smallville, one of the principal settings for all Superman comics, films, and other adaptations.
Midway City	The Brave and the Bold #34 (February–March 1961)	Gardner Fox, Joe Kubert	DC Comics	Fictional Midwestern city based loosely on the real world city of Chicago, Illinois and once home of the Silver Age Hawkman and Hawkgirl.
Moucheron	Prudence Petitpas	Maurice Maréchal	Le Lombard	The home village of Prudence.
Mouseton (sometimes named Mouseville)	Mickey Mouse	Floyd Gottfredson	Disney comics	The home town of Mickey Mouse.
Nutwood	Rupert the Bear	Mary Tourtel	Daily Express	Rupert's home town, based in the region of Snowdonia and Vale of Clwyd, in the northern part of Wales.
Pelotillehue	Condorito	Pepo (cartoonist)	/	The home town of Condorito.
Port Oswego	Naomi	Brian Michael Bendis and David F. Walker	DC Comics	Hometown of the main heroine located in Oregon.
Puddington	Clifton	Raymond Macherot	Le Lombard	The home town of Colonel Clifton.
Rajevols	Les Petits Hommes	Pierre Seron	Dupuis	The home miniature village of the little men who are the protagonists.
Rajnagar	-	-	Raj Comics	Fictional city usually appearing in the comic book published by Raj Comics.
Riverdale		Bob Montana	Archie Comics	A fictional American town that is the principal setting for the various Archie Comics titles and characters.
Rommeldam	Tom Poes	Marten Toonder	/	The home village of Tom Poes, Olivier B. Bommel and all other characters.
Smallville	Superboy #2 (May 1949)		DC Comics	A fictional town in the American Midwest (often placed in Kansas) that is the hometown of Superman, where he landed on earth as an infant and was raised under an ordinary human identity in a small, idyllic farming community.
Star City	Adventure Comics #266 (November 1959)		DC Comics	The home of the superheroes known by, or affiliated with, the shared alias of Green Arrow. Beyond that, it is also known to other characters of the DC Universe as both a port city and a haven for artists in many of the media, from print to audio-visual to music.
Szohôd	The Adventures of Tintin	Hergé	Casterman	Fictional capital city of the fictional State of Borduria in The Calculus Affair, the home of Colonel Sponsz and the country's fascist military dictator, Marshal Kûrvi-Tasch.
Tollembeek	Urbanus	Willy Linthout	/	While a real-life Tollembeek exists and is the actual birth city of the comedian Urbanus on whom the comic strip was based, the way it is depicted in the series is completely fictional.
Vinkelboda	Kronblom	Elov Persson	/	Vinkelboda is the home town of Kronblom and his wife Malin. It is a quiet country village in Sweden.
Vivejoie-La-Grande	Benoît Brisefer	Peyo	/	The home village of Benoît.
Winkelse	Kramikske	Jean-Pol	/	The home village of Kramikske and his friends.
Zonnedorp	Jommeke	Jef Nys	/	The home village of Jommeke and his friends.
