= Mandel Karlsson =

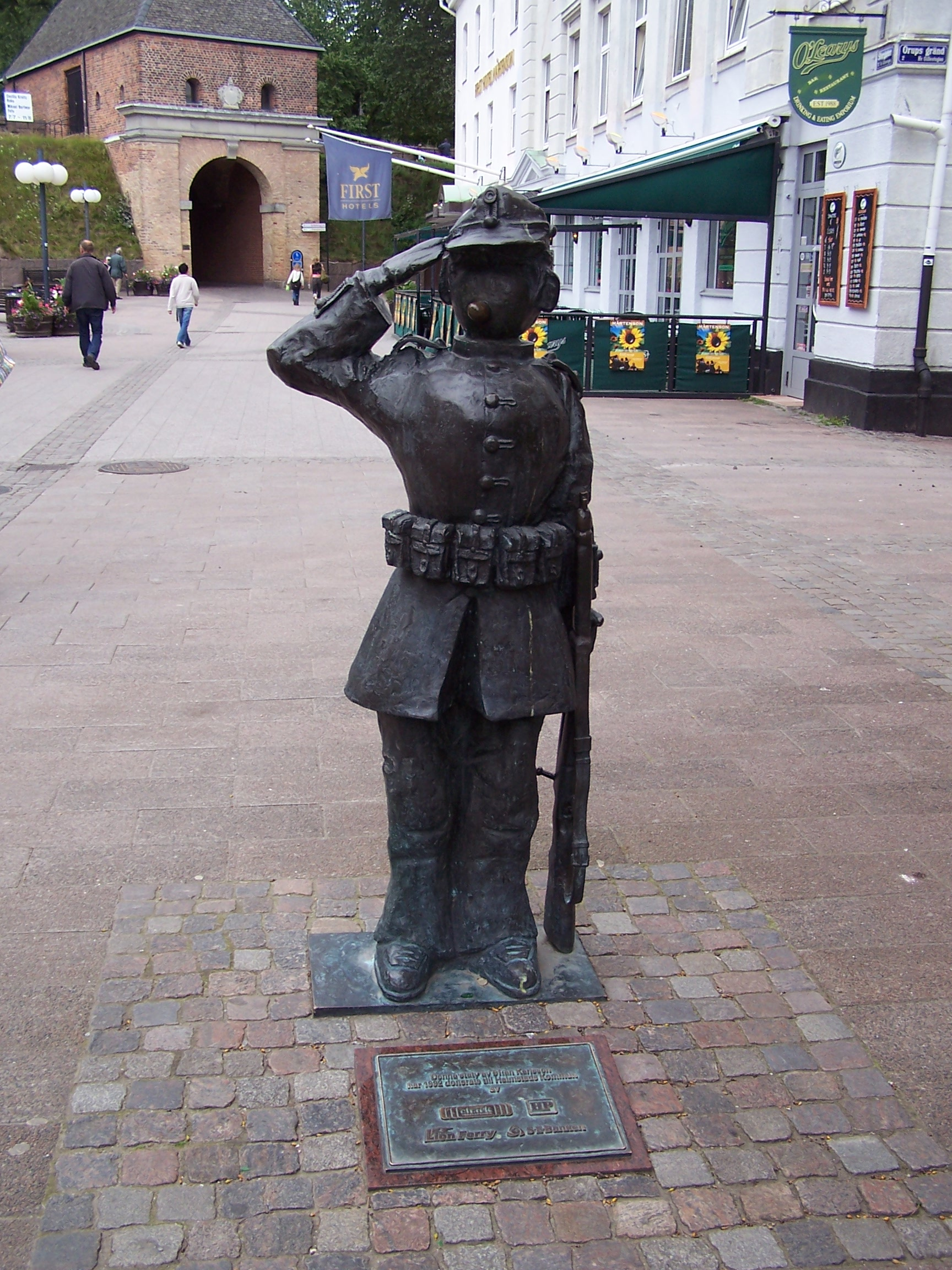
A statue of Mandel Karlsson in Halmstad, Halland, Sweden.

Mandel Karlsson, also known as 91:an Karlsson or 91:an, is a Swedish comic book character and the main protagonist in the comic strip series 91:an (Eng: № 91). He was created in 1932 by Rudolf Petersson. The series is now published in its own bi-weekly comic book, 91:an, and also as a single strip in the popular weekly women's magazine Året Runt.

== Mandel's personality ==
Mandel Karlsson is based on two people Rudolf Petersson met during his national service in the Halland Regiment. He based his characters 91:an Karlsson and 87:an Axelsson on a man named Smålandian. Mandel Karlsson is written as a sympathetic character. During the first three decades, Mandel was fond of fighting, but became a less aggressive, gentler character during the highly successful period of Nils Egerbrandt's work, starting in the 1960s.

Mandel Karlsson is a young man, aged perhaps 20 or 21, who is a military conscript in the Swedish Army. He is attached to the fictional Klackamo Regiment. His number is "91", thus he is widely known in Sweden as "91:an Karlsson", although in the comic strip itself he is almost always referred to as Mandel (English: Almond), or simply 91:an.

Mandel is the son of Mandolina and Johan Karlsson. From a working-class rural background, he often uses colloquial dialect expressions and vocabulary and possesses a connection to animals. He is a well-known accordionist. Previously, he was also a heavy smoker.

He is very keen on his love interest Elvira Olsson, although they have regular fall-outs. Elvira often has to take the initiative in romantic matters. His sidekick, Lars Fjodor Axelsson, is a brasher, naughtier character, and has frequently tried to compete with Mandel for the attentions of Elvira. Mandel has been known to express a lively interest in other young ladies who meet his acquaintance, but less so than other conscripts at the Klackamo Regiment.

Mandel is well liked by the senior officers at the regiment and is quickly forgiven for his frequent transgressions of the rules. He often does chores for Överste Gyllenskalp at home, for example walking his Great Dane, Caesar.

== Media adaptations ==
The comics were adapted into a theatrical play and a series of films.

== See also ==
- 91:an (comic strip)
- 91:an (comic book)
- The Good Soldier Švejk
- The Life and Extraordinary Adventures of Private Ivan Chonkin
