= 91:an (comic strip) =

Comic strip created by Rudolf Petersson

- 91:an cover, Christmas, 2005, drawn by Gert Lozell. Illustrated are Mandel Karlsson (in the blue uniform), Colonel Hector Gyllenskalp (the thin officer), Adéle Charlotte Gyllenskalp (his wife), Major Hampus Morgonkröök (the fat officer), and the Colonel's grandson.
- Author(s): Rudolf Petersson
- Current status/schedule: Current weekly strip
- Launch date: 1932; 93 years ago
- Genre(s): Military humor, satire
- Preceded by: En beväringsmans upplevelser och äventyr

91:an (Eng: № 91) is a popular Swedish comic strip, created in 1932 with the title En beväringsmans upplevelser och äventyr ("A military man's experiences and adventures"). This name soon changed to 91:an Karlsson, by Rudolf Petersson. It is now published in its own bi-weekly comic book, 91:an, and also as a single strip in the popular weekly women's magazine Året Runt.

The principal character in the strip is Mandel Karlsson, a young man (aged perhaps 20 or 21) doing conscript military service in the Swedish Army, based at the fictional Klackamo Regiment. His number is "91", thus he is widely known in Sweden as "91:an Karlsson", although in the comic strip itself he is almost always referred to as Mandel (Eng: Almond, a very unusual first name), or simply 91:an.

Several of the officers are based on real people Rudolf Petersson met during his national service at the I 16 regiment in Halmstad, Halland, between 1916 and 1918. The premises of Klackamo Regiment, and the small town hosting it, Klackamo, are assumed to also be loosely based on the real regiment I 16, plus a quaint depiction of small-town and rural Sweden loosely based on places in Halland.

Originally all the characters wore the blue uniform with brass buttons (possibly a late 19th-century model), but when it was replaced by a more modern uniform in 1939 the new uniform was applied to all characters but 91:an, who kept the outdated version. Since then the uniform of the Swedish army has been changed in 1959 and 1990, but has not resulted in any changes in the uniforms used in the comic strip.

== 91:an cartoonists ==
- Rudolf Petersson (creator)
- Jonas Darnell
- Nils Egerbrandt
- Jan Gissberg
- Gösta Gummesson
- Görgen Kronberg
- Gert Lozell
- Olle Nilsson
- Jonny Nordlund
- Patrik Norrman
- Ola Nyberg
- Gunnar Persson
- Krister Petersson
- Tobias Sjölund
- Tommy Strindholt
- Bertil Wilhelmsson

== Principal cartoon characters in the strip ==
=== Conscripts ===
- 91:an Karlsson: Mandel Karlsson (principal character)
- 87:an Axelsson: Lars Fjodor Axelsson (the sidekick) (now has his own comic book of republished 91:an strips)
- 52:an Johansson
- 55:an "Bamsefar"
- 57:an Kvist
- 63:an Gustavsson
- 64:an
- 68:an Andersson
- 72:an Pettersson
- 89:an Olofsson
- 106:an Anderberg
- 110:an Jyckenberg
- Rosmarie Nilsson

=== Officers ===
==== Klackamo Regiment ====
- Överste Hector Gyllenskalp (Colonel Gyllenskalp: surname translates as Goldenscalp, a reference to the character's bald head)
- Major Hampus Morgonkröök (Major Morgonkröök: surname roughly translates as morning bend, bend being vernacular expression for alcohol, fr. verb 'Att Kröka' To Bend,)
- Doktor Karl Arne Krank (Regimental doctor, with the rank of Major)
- Kapten Julius Berån (Captain)
- Löjtnant Ferdinand Bourdong (1st Lieutenant)
- Fänrik Filip von Fikonstrååle (2nd Lieutenant)
- Fanjunkare Ansgar Fridht (Warrant Officer)
- Sergeant Emil Korn (Staff Sergeant)
- Sergeant Livén (disappeared from the strip in the 1930s)
- Furir Rickard Revär (Sergeant, frequently the fall guy)
- Furir Konrad Mild
- Korpral Krevad (Corporal, disappeared from the strip in the 1930s)

==== Others ====
- General Rufus Bäävenhielm
- General Fredrik Bäävenhielm (no longer in the strip)
- General Jävelberg
- General Knakenplast
- General Herved Pölsen
- Överste Klaage

=== Civilians ===
- Elvira Olsson, occasionally named "Johansson", Kapten Berån's maid, and Mandel Karlsson's (and often Lars Fjodor Axelsson's and Rickard Revär's) love interest
- Jenny Andersson, occasionally named "Jonsson", Elvira's cousin, has worked in the Regimental office
- Bottina Axelsson, 87:an's mother, regularly works as a cleaner at the Regimental offices
- Monika Beatrix Berån (Kapten Berån's wife)
- Platina von Blomsterlöök, mother-in-law of Colonel Hector Gyllenskalp
- Doris von Bäävenhielm, wife of Rufus Bäävenhielm
- Tilda Fransson, Mandel's first girlfriend
- Kommunalråd Bertram Fjälkespjut, local councillor
- Harry Gnuthagen, Editor of the Klackamoposten, local newspaper
- Fröken (miss) Grandin, Colonel Hector Gyllenskalp's secretary
- Husmor Greta Gustavsson, the Regimental matron
- Adéle Charlotte Gyllenskalp, wife of Colonel Hector Gyllenskalp
- Johan Karlsson, Mandel's father
- Mandolina Karlsson, Mandel's mother
- Janne Tosesson, TV-reporter for "Uppdrag Förvanskning"
- "Gamle Mäster", works in the Regimental stores
- Hulda, Elvira's aunt
- Ulrika "Ulle", the Canteen girl
- Toftaligan, a local band of petty criminals, drives a hot-rod
- Tomteligan, another local band of criminals, slightly more dangerous than Toftaligan

== Films based on the comic strip ==
- 91:an Karlsson. "Hela Sveriges lilla beväringsman" (1946)
- 91:an Karlssons permis (1947)
- 91 Karlssons bravader (1951)
- Alla tiders 91 Karlsson (1953)
- 91 Karlsson rycker in (1955)
- 91:an Karlsson slår knock out (1957)
- 91:an Karlsson muckar (tror han) (1959)
- 91:an och generalernas fnatt (1977)

== See also ==
- 91:an comic book
- Mandel Karlsson
- 91 Stomperud, a Norwegian comic character initially based on the Swedish character
- Kronblom
- Adamson Awards
