= Silent Sam (disambiguation) =

Silent Sam refers to a statue of a Confederate soldier on the campus of the University of North Carolina at Chapel Hill.

Silent Sam may also refer to:

- Silent Sam (comics)
- The name of a Canadian distilled vodka produced by Diageo
- Silent Sam, The Dancing Midget, a stage name for Sammy Davis Jr. when he was a child
- Silent Sam, the order entry terminal at Service Merchandise stores
- Sam Calder (1916–2008), Australian politician and World War II flying ace
- Samuel Pierce (1922–2000), American lawyer and politician
