= Uti vår hage =

Uti vår hage may refer to:

- Uti vår hage (comic strip), Swedish comic strip and associated magazine
- Uti vår hage (song), Swedish folk song
- Uti vår hage (TV series), Norwegian comedy sketch show
