= Mats Jonsson =

Mats Jonsson is the name of:

- Mats Jonsson (cartoonist) (born 1973), Swedish comic creator
- Mats Jonsson (rally driver) (born 1957), Swedish rally driver
