= Oscar Jacobsson =

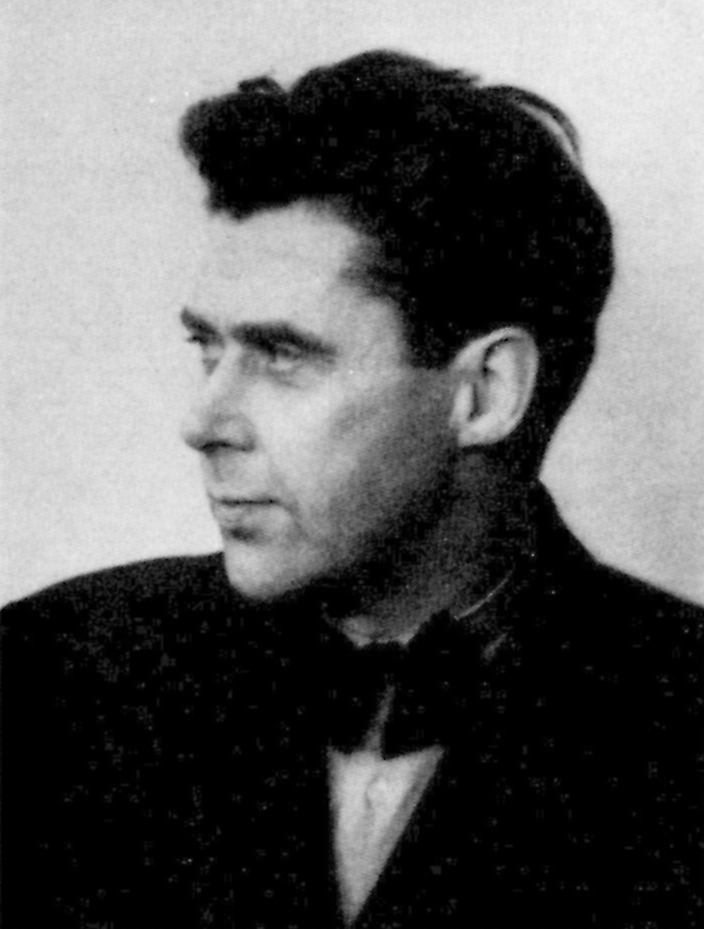
Oscar Jacobsson

Oscar Jacobsson (Gothenburg, 1889 – Solberga, December 25, 1945) was a Swedish comic creator and cartoonist who started his career in 1918 when his first newspaper illustration was published. Jacobsson's first illustrations were published in Naggen.

In 1920, he created the comic strip Adamson for the publication Söndags-Nisse. Adamson himself was a (usually) silent little cigar-smoking man with a big hat and frequent misadventures.

The strip soon became very popular and became published in hundreds of newspapers all over the world. In the United States, it became known as "Silent Sam".

Jacobsson also worked for other publications. His illustrations frequently appeared in magazines and papers like Exlex, Dagens Nyheter and Lutfisken. Near the end of his stellar career, Jacobsson created another comic character: Abu Fakir. This was published in Vi.

== Keeping Adamson Alive ==
'Adamson' outlived his creator; the Danish artist Viggo Ludvigsen continued the comic strip for nearly two decades after Oscar Jacobsson's death in 1945. And in the U.S. two artists kept Jacobson alive—Henry Thol from 1935 to 1940 and Jeff Hayes from 1941 to 1953.

== The Adamson Award ==
In 1965, the Swedish Comic Academy founded the "Adamson Awards" in Jacobsson's honor. This "Nobel Prize of comics" is given to one Swedish and one international comic creator every year.
