= Liv Strömquist =

Swedish comics artist and radio presenter

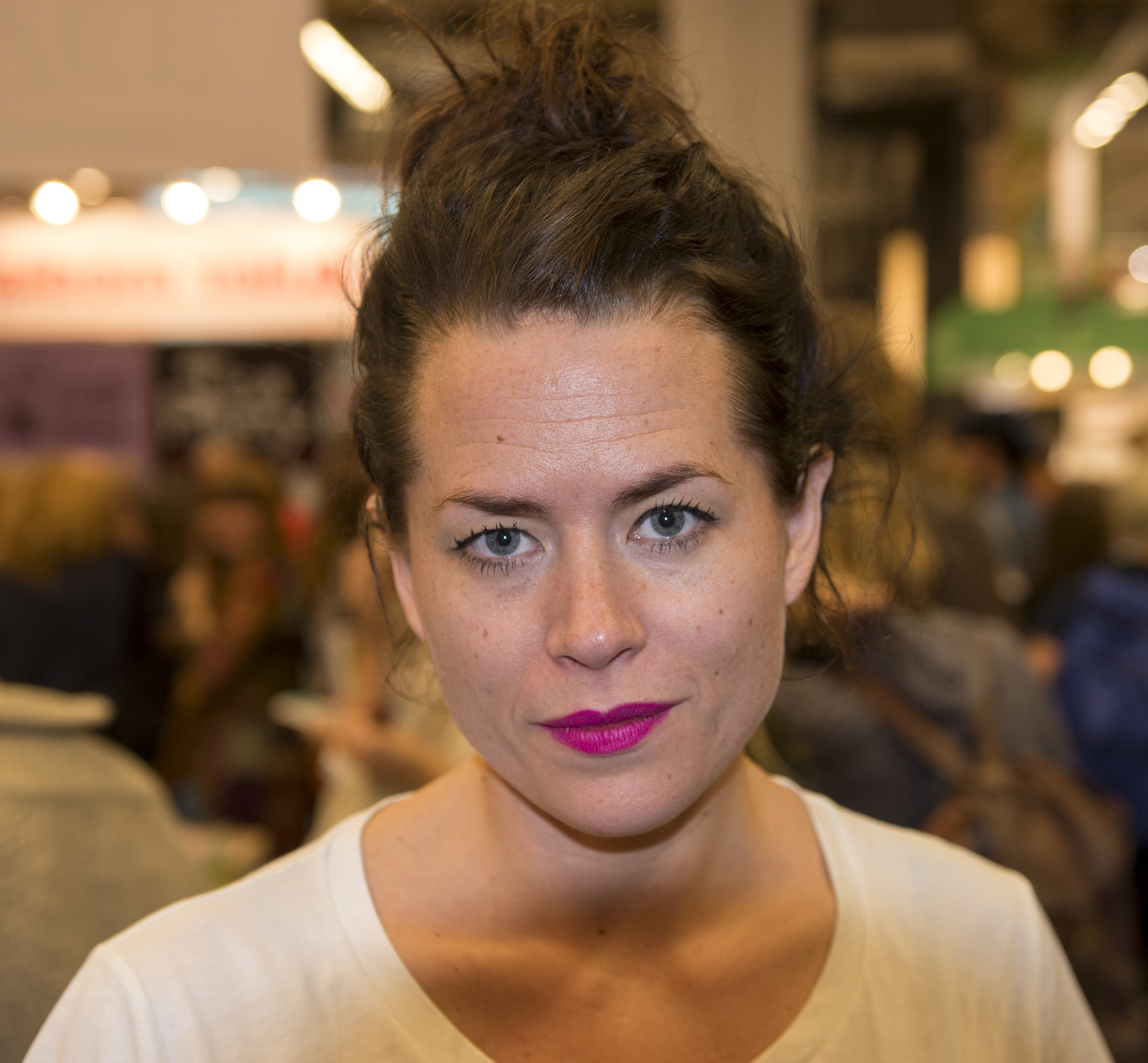
- Liv Strömquist at the Gothenburg book fair in September 2013
- Born: 3 February 1978
- Occupation: Comics artist, illustrator, radio personality
- Awards: ABF Literature Prize (2011); Axel Liffner scholarship (2011); Gustaf Fröding scholarship (2011); Adamson Awards (2012); EWK award (2013); Ankan (2012); Region Skånes kulturpris (2013); Sydsvenska Dagbladets kulturpris (2014); Dagens Nyheter Culture Prize (2015); Karl Gerhard-stipendiet (2016); Lena Nyman Prize (2017); Kolla! (2020); Tage Danielsson Award (2020); Malmö City Culture Award (2024); (2019); Honorary doctor of Malmö University (2016); Honorary doctor of the Catholic University of Louvain (2021)

Liv Strömquist (born February 3, 1978) is a Swedish comics artist and radio presenter. She is best known for her comics that employ satire, humor, and academic research to critique sociopolitical issues, particularly from a feminist perspective. Her work frequently deconstructs themes such as the nuclear family, romantic love, and gender inequality. Strömquist's comics have been described as a form of "popular education" or "gender studies in the medium of comics."

== Life and career ==
Strömquist was born in Lund and grew up in Ravlunda in the Österlen region of south Sweden. Today she lives in Malmö. Already as a five-year old she made her own comics, but stopped, until she took up drawing comics at the age of 23. Her flatmate made her interested in comic fanzines then. With Rikedomen, she published her first own fanzine.

Her breakthrough as a comic artist followed with her first album Hundra procent fett ("One hundred percent fat"), which was published in 2005. She regularly publishes in the comic magazine Galago in various magazines and newspapers such as Dagens Nyheter, Dagens Arbete, Bang, Aftonbladet and Ordfront Magasin. She designed the cover for the 2013 album Shaking the Habitual by the band The Knife. She also made a comic strip for the band's website, which depicted income inequality in a satirical manner.

Strömquist studied sociology at Lund University and earned a degree in political science at Malmö University. Strömquist has been awarded an honorary doctorate twice. In 2016 by Malmö University and in 2021 by UCLouvain.

Since 2005, she has been working for the youth radio station Sveriges Radio P3. She was involved in the satirical programs Tankesmedjan and Pang Prego. Together with the author Caroline Ringskog Ferrada-Noli, she runs the podcast En varg söker sin pod for the newspaper Expressen. In the SVT program Liv och Horace i Europa, which was broadcast in spring 2016, she travelled through Europe together with Horace Engdahl and discussed the lives of various authors.

== Style and themes ==
=== Feminist satire ===
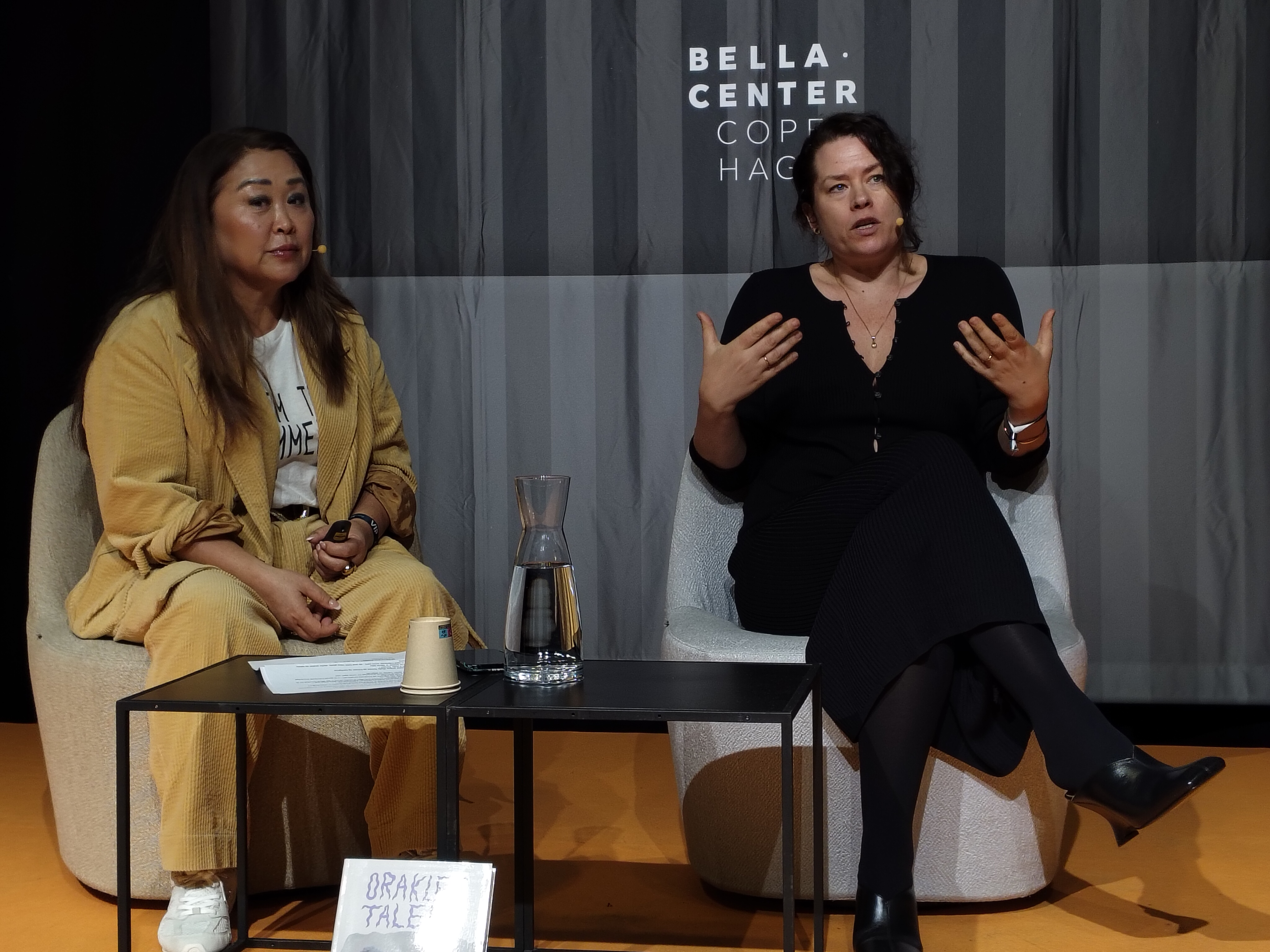
Strömquist being interviewed by Ann Lind Andersen at Bogforum 2025

Her comics are mostly about sociopolitical issues from a feminist and left-wing perspective. They are satirical essays about power and injustices.

A central and recurring theme in Strömquist's oeuvre is a critical examination of the nuclear family, heterosexual coupledom, and romantic love. According to scholars Kristy Beers Fägersten, Anna Nordenstam, and Margareta Wallin Wictorin, Strömquist uses satire to expose and critique the societal promotion of the nuclear family as an ideal, highlighting how its conservative values disproportionately burden women. In works like Einsteins fru (2008) and its 2018 republication, she interrogates the historical construction of this ideal and its contemporary consequences, such as the unequal distribution of unpaid domestic labor and childcare.

Her satire often targets authority figures and institutions that champion the traditional family. Scholars point to her depictions of politicians, television personalities like Dr. Phil, and religious leaders such as the Pope, whose pronouncements on family values are rendered absurd or hypocritical through ironic commentary and caricature.

=== Visual style and textual strategies ===
Strömquist's art is characterized by its dense, textually rich panels that blend black-and-white line drawings, photo collages, and brightly colored illustrations. Her work is pedagogical, frequently incorporating footnoted references to academic research in fields such as philosophy, psychology, sociology, history, and gender studies, leading scholars to describe it as "gender studies in the medium of comics."

Strömquist employs specific visual and textual strategies to deconstruct her themes. Scholars note her use of mimicked family portraits, such as selfies, 19th-century bourgeois photos, and 1970s-style group shots, to visually represent the idealized family. These images are then subverted by critical dialogue in speech balloons, creating a satirical disconnect between the polished familial image and the problematic reality it conceals.

Another key device is her use of "scare quotes" and "air quotes." As analyzed by Fägersten, Nordenstam, and Wictorin, Strömquist repeatedly places terms like "children," "in love," "couple," and "natural" in quotation marks within captions and dialogue. This practice, sometimes mirrored by characters making air-quote gestures, serves to question the naturalness and stability of these concepts, exposing them as ideological constructs used to promote a specific, often restrictive, family model.

== Reception ==
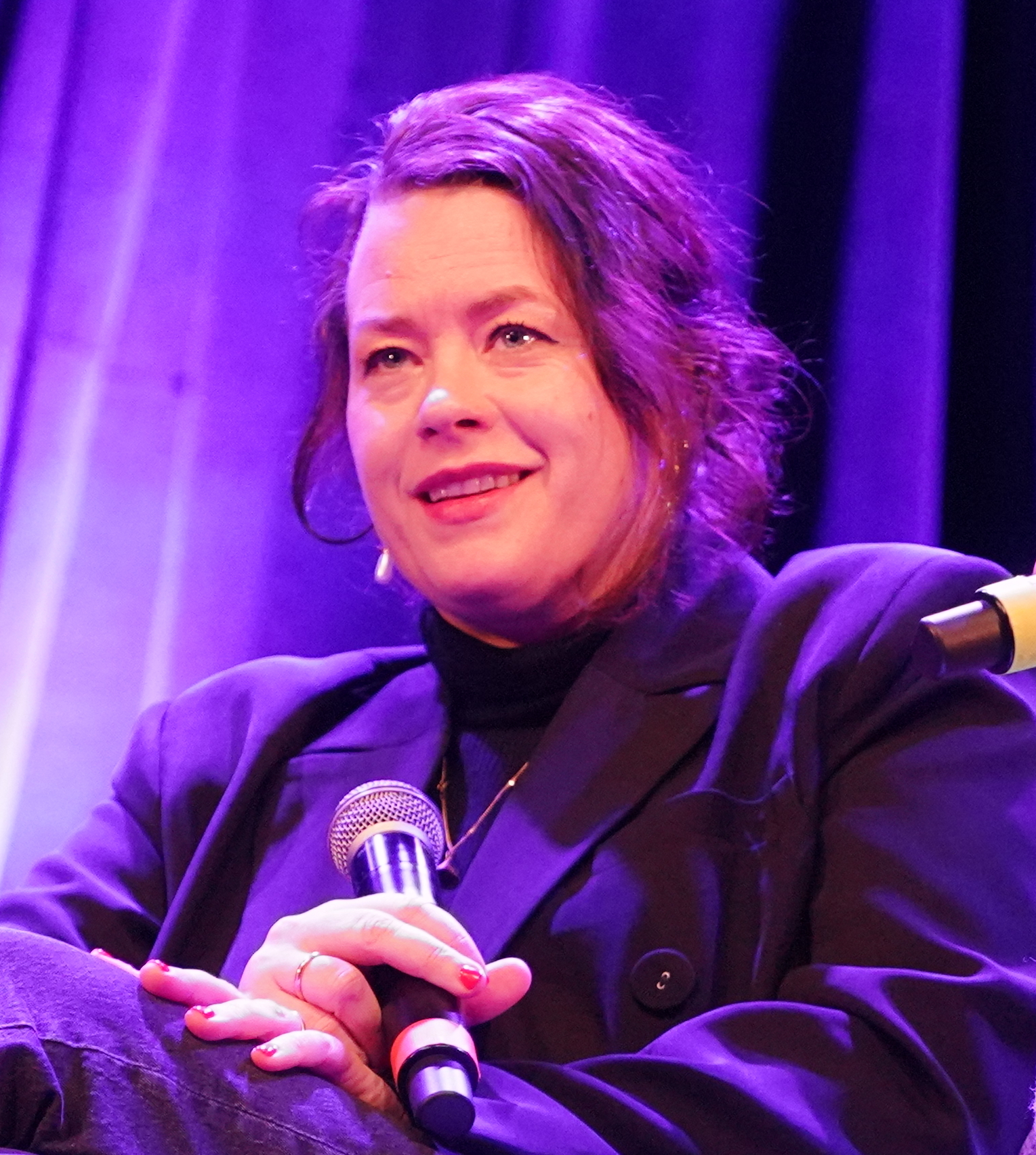
Strömquist in 2025

Most of her books have been translated into French and German. Fruit of Knowledge, (Kunskapens frukt) about the taboo of menstruation and the vulva in society has also been translated into Bulgarian, Catalan, Croatian, Czech, Danish, Dutch, English, Finnish, Galician, Greek, Italian, Japanese, Korean, Macedonian, Polish, Portuguese, Russian, Slovene, Spanish, Turkish and Ukrainian.

She has won several awards for her work:

- Adamson Award 2012
- EWK Award 2013
- Kolla! 2020

== Works ==
- Hundra procent fett. Ordfront/Galago 2005.
- Drift. Kolik förlag 2007 (together with Jan Bielecki).
- Einsteins fru. Ordfront/Galago 2008.
- Prins Charles Känsla. Ordfront/Galago 2010.
- Ja till Liv!. Ordfront/Galago 2011.
- Månadens moderat Kalender 2013. Ordfront Förlag 2013.
- Kunskapens frukt. Ordfront/Galago 2014. (Eng. trans. Fruit of Knowledge, Fantagraphics Books 2018.)
- Kära Liv och Caroline. Natur & Kultur 2015 (together with Caroline Ringskog Ferrada-Noli).
- Uppgång & Fall. Ordfront/Galago 2016.
- Den rödaste rosen slår ut. Ordfront/Galago 2019. (Eng. trans. The reddest rose, Fantagraphics Books 2022.)
- Inne i spegelsalen. Norstedts 2021.
- Liv Strömquists astrologi. Norstedts 2022.
- Pythian pratar. Norstedts 2024.
