= François Bourgeon =

French comics artist

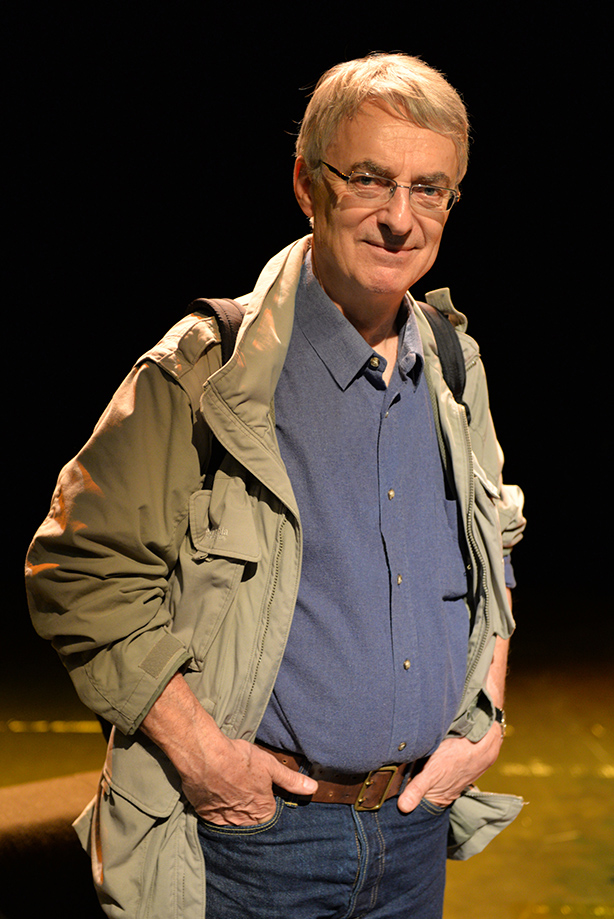
- Born: 5 July 1945 (age 81) Paris, France
- Areas: artist, writer, colourist
- Pseudonym: Bourgeon
- Notable works: Les Passagers du vent Les Compagnons du crépuscule Le Cycle de Cyann
- Awards: full list

François Bourgeon (born 5 July 1945, Paris) is a French comics artist, who creates his work in the Franco-Belgian "Bande Dessinée" (BD) tradition.

== Biography ==
Bourgeon was originally educated as a master stained glass artist, but difficulties in finding employment and a passion for drawing altered his course onto a different career. Getting illustrations published in magazines from 1971 eventually led him to pursue graphic storytelling and to develop his craft over the next few years. His first major BD work became the first two, 1976–77, outings in the medieval series Brunelle et Colin, whose two subsequent comic album formats were published by publisher Glénat Editions in 1979–80, in the process becoming Bourgeon's very first BD books thus released. These two titles already foreshadowed his later, more grim medieval epic Les Compagnons du crépuscule (The Companions of the Dusk), both thematically as well as art-wise.

When the likewise by Glénat published Les Passagers du vent (The Passengers of the Wind) series, for which Bourgeon abandoned Brunelle et Colin, was serialized in Circus magazine in the time period July 1979-June 1984, it became recognized as one of the most important European comic series of its era. His graphic novels have ranged from nautical and medieval historical fiction to science fiction, and characteristically, within settings of violence and sexuality, epic stories revolve around strong female characters. Brunelle, Isa, Mariotte and Cyann are the heroines of each their series, Brunelle et Colin, The Passagers of the Wind, The Twilight Companions and The Cyann Saga, respectively. Over the course of his career, Bourgeon became in his home country honored for his BD work with no less than four awards from the Angoulême International Comics Festival, Europe's second largest, but most prestigious BD festival.

Bourgeon is noted as a thorough researcher and his drawings, from 17th-century ships to 14th-century clothing, have a reputation for historical accuracy. For example, when working on The Passengers of the Wind, he did a vast amount of background reading, consulted academic specialists and visited the Maritime Museum in Nantes. For this series he also made scale models both of colonial architectural structures and one of the ships on which the main characters sail, in order to ensure that the dimensions and the interior layouts were correct. The same approach has been used for other works too. In The Cyann Saga he built models of the machines and buildings seen in the series, so he could walk around them and see them from different perspectives and light conditions. His time-consuming and meticulous research has resulted in that his body of work is relatively modest in comparison to the ones created by his major contemporaries such as Jean "Mœbius" Giraud, Hermann Huppen or André Juillard.

After Bourgeon had finished up on the last volume of Les Passagers du vent saga in 2022, he retired from creating BDs and decided to donate his entire body of work, both BD art originals and associated research materials, to the Cité internationale de la bande dessinée et de l'image museum, France's preeminent BD institution and Europe's largest comics museum, located in the French town of Angoulême. He did so in the conviction that this would secure his BD legacy for posterity. The museum responded with the large year-long (August 22, 2023–May 5, 2024) "François Bourgeon et la traversée des mondes" exposition, celebrating his career as a BD artist.

Bourgeon has lived for most of his life in Cornouaille in Brittany – explaining his specific 2023 Breton BD award listed below.

== BD album bibliography ==
In Europe, it had been customary for a series to first see a serialized comic magazine pre-publication, before each individual volume was released in its entirety as a comic book, or rather comic album in Europe's case. In France, Bourgeon's two Brunelle et Colin volumes were serialized by Éditions Fleurus in their BD periodical Djinn from November 1976 onward. His second major series, Les Passagers du vent was serialized by publisher Glénat in its Circus comic magazine as referenced above, whereas Bourgeon's third major series, Les Compagnons du crépuscule, became serialized by publisher Casterman in its (À Suivre) comics magazine in the period October 1985-January 1990. The comic magazine pre-publication format though, became largely defunct in the 1990s because of the waning interest in the format. This resulted in that Bourgeon's work was afterwards directly released by the various publishers in the album format.

=== Brunelle et Colin ===
(with Robert Génin)

- 1. Le vol noir (1979, ISBN 2-7234-0099-9)
- 2. Yglinga (1980, ISBN 2-7234-0168-5)

=== Les Passagers du vent (The Passengers of the Wind) ===
- 1. La fille sous la dunette (1980, ISBN 2-7234-0132-4)
- 2. Le ponton (1980, ISBN 2-7234-0164-2)
- 3. Le comptoir de Juda (1981, ISBN 2-7234-0215-0)
- 4. L'heure du serpent (1982, ISBN 2-7234-0290-8)
- 5. Le bois d'ébène (1984, ISBN 2-7234-0440-4)
- 6. La petite fille Bois-Caïman - Livre 1 (2009, ISBN 978-2-35648-066-8)
- 7. La petite fille Bois-Caïman - Livre 2 (2010, ISBN 978-2-35648-112-2)
- 8. Le sang des cerises - Livre 1: Rue de l'Abreuvoir (2018, ISBN 978-2-413-00408-0)
- 9. Le sang des cerises - Livre 2: Rue des Martyrs (2022, ISBN 978-2-413-03062-1)
- HS. Les chantiers d'une aventure (1994, with Michel Thiébaut, ISBN 2-203-38023-3)
- HS. Le chemin de l'Atchafalaya (2010, with Michel Thiébaut, ISBN 978-2-356-48202-0)

=== Les Compagnons du crépuscule (The Companions of the Dusk) ===
- 1. Le sortilège du bois des brumes (1983, ISBN 2-203-33516-5)
- 2. Les yeux d'étain de la ville glauque (1986, ISBN 2-203-33811-3)
- 3. Le dernier chant des Malaterre (1990, ISBN 2-203-33830-X)
- HS Dans le sillage des sirènes (1992, with Michel Thiébaut, ISBN 2-203-38021-7)

=== Le Cycle de Cyann (The Cyann Saga) ===
(with Claude Lacroix)

- 1. La sOurce et la sOnde (1993, ISBN 2-203-38857-9)
- 2. Six saisons sur ilO (1997, ISBN 2-203-38894-3)
- 3. Aïeïa d'Aldaal (2005, ISBN 2-7493-0218-8)
- 4. Les couleurs de Marcade (2007, ISBN 978-2-7493-0239-3)
- 5. Les couloirs de l'Entretemps (2012, ISBN 978-2-35648-323-2)
- 6. Les aubes douces d'Aldalarann (2014)
- HS. La clef des confins: D'Olh à ilO et au-delà (1997, ISBN 2-203-38030-6)

==== Cyann Saga background information ====
A prolonged legal battle caused significant release delays of the individual volumes in Bourgeon's Cyann science fiction saga, further bogging down his already slow BD production pace.

===== The Cyann Saga affair =====
Cyann Olsimar

When Bourgeon's usual publisher since 1983, the family-owned company Casterman, was bought by the large corporation Groupe Flammarion, legal problems over financial remunerations ensued. Bourgeon and Lacroix claimed that Flammarion had altered the sales numbers to slow down royalty payments to the authors, and then committed other irregularities. The authors took Flammarion to court in 1999. Flammarion countersued separately, charging the authors over failure to produce a new album of the Cyann series in less than three years. The contract between the authors and Casterman had never specified a fixed date or time period for producing any album, but despite this, on 30 October 2001 a court decided in favor of Flammarion and ordered the authors to produce an album (the third of the series), with a fine of €1000 per each day's delay. On 27 April 2004 an appeals court finally overturned the judgment of the previous court. In the meantime these litigations had become a "cause célèbre" in France, because of the intellectual freedom questions and copyright issues they raised in literary circles. In the end, the authors got their liberty and their rights and the third album of the cycle finally came out in 2005, eight years after the previous one, through a different publishing house, Vents d'Ouest – currently part of Bourgeon's former alma mater publisher Glénat.

===== Nature of collaboration with Claude Lacroix =====
In an interview in the "Dare-Dare" program of Radio Suisse Romande, as wall as a February 2007 interview on the launch of "Les couleurs de Marcade" installment in the "Cycle de Cyann" series, François Bourgeon revealed the nature of the collaboration between him and Claude Lacroix. For this most recent album as well as the others in the Cyann series Lacroix had the task of creating nearly all of the complex decors, natural or man made be they planets or islands, cities or buildings. In this way he created for Bourgeon the futuristic equivalent of the thorough documentation which had always been the basis for his previous series.

Lacroix, an old friend and collaborator of Bourgeon from times pre-dating those of his other series, created the decors and many of the more important objects of the Cyann series by making sketches and drawings and paintings, and also a few solid three-dimensional models at times. The solid model for the city in "Les couleurs de Marcade" took up several meters of space at Lacroix's home. The process for this universe-making was always interactive and non-exclusive. In some instances Bourgeon would choose to make himself some of those background sketches, and he would later show them to Lacroix for his opinion. Regardless of who initiated a sketch or large drawing, the two would exchange comments at all steps as the decor went from early sketch form to finished product within the BD.

== In foreign translation ==
In large swaths of the rest of continental Europe, Bourgeon's work became highly appreciated as well (as brought home by the multiple non-French honors listed below), and he saw his work translated in Croatian, Danish, Dutch, Finnish, German, Italian, Norwegian, Polish, Portuguese, Serbian, Spanish, and Swedish. Unlike in native France, almost all European countries saw the bulk of Bourgeon's work published in the direct-to-album publication format. The only known exceptions concerned the into Dutch translated De Gezellen van de Schemering (Les Compagnons du crépuscule) series which was serialized in Wordt Vervolgd – Casterman's Dutch-language counterpart version of (À Suivre!) – in the same time period the French-language serialized magazine publication was (save for the second part of volume 3 due to the Dutch-language magazine variant becoming defunct in the summer of 1989 way ahead of its French-language counterpart), as well as the into Portuguese translated Os Passageiros do Vento (Les Passagers du vent) whose first four volumes were serialized in Expresso's Jornal da BD comics magazine in the period 1983–85.

In English

Despite the acclaim Bourgeon has received for his work in native France and the rest of mainland Europe, virtually none of his work has seen translations into English as of 2025, save one. US publisher Catalan Communications had planned to release his medieval epic Les Compagnons du crépuscule as The Companions of the Dusk in 1991, but only the first volume of the series was released as such, as the publisher went bankrupt shortly thereafter.

1. The Companions of the Dusk: "The Spell of the Misty Forest", 48 pages, July 1991 paperback, Catalan Communications USA, ISBN 0-87416-126-6 (translation Elizabeth Bell).

== Awards ==
- 1980: (France) Angoulême «Best Artist» Award at the Angoulême International Comics Festival for "La Fille sous la dunette".
- 1984: (Italy) «Best Foreign Artist» Yellow Kid Award at the Lucca Comics & Games convention (Europe's largest comics festival) for entire body of work.
- 1985: (France) Angoulême «FM-BD» Award for "Le Bois d'ébène".
- 1988: (Spain) «Best Long Comic Strip and Best Drawing» Haxtur Award nomination at the International Comics Convention of the Principality of Asturias.
- 1990: (Norway) «Best Translated Comic» Sproing Award from the Norsk Tegneserieforum for Skumringens venner (Les compagnons de crépuscule).
- 1991: (France) Angoulême «Best Audience» Award for "Le dernier chant des Malaterre".
- 1991: (Sweden) «Best Translated Title» Urhunden Prize from Seriefrämjandet for "Sirenens Sång" ("Le Dernier Chant des Malaterre")'.
- 1998: (France) «Best Francophone Bande Dessinée» Ozone Award from the French Science-Fiction magazine: Toutes les dimensions de l'Imaginaire quarterly (and named after its progenitor Ozone fanzine) for "Six saisons sur ilO".
- 1998: (France) Angoulême «Alph-Art du Public» Award for "Six saisons sur ilO".
- 2002: (France) «Grand Boum-Caisse d'Épargne» Award at the Blois bd BOUM comics festival.
- 2021: (France) Induction in the BD Gest' "Le Panthéon de la BD - Franco-Belge" hall of fame.
- 2022: (Sweden) «Best International Comic-Strip [or comic book] Cartoonist» Adamson Award from the Svenska Serieakademien for entire body of work.
- 2023: (France) «BD Bretonne» Award at the Quimper Penn ar BD comics festival for "Le Sang des cerises - Livre 2".
