= Uti vår hage (comic strip) =

Swedish comic strip

Uti vår hage Christmas album 1995, with the main character Faló on the cover. © Semic/Krister Petersson

Uti vår hage (English: Out in our pasture, named after a Swedish folk song) is a Swedish comic strip, created by Krister Petersson. It originally appeared in Svenska Serier in 1981. It then began a long run in 91:an (1983 - December 2001). On 5 December 2002 Uti vår hage became a bi-monthly comic, published by Egmont. It also ran briefly as a daily strip in Dagens Nyheter.

== The comic strip ==
The main character is Faló, an immature and self-righteous man in his mid-30s who lives in the small, fictional Swedish town of Mjölhagen, loosely based on a town in Småland. His last name is never revealed. Lacking any obvious source of income, he nevertheless lives in his own detached villa on Friggagatan with large garden and drives an old Volvo Amazon. He has an extremely high opinion of himself and his own abilities (especially his intelligence), which fails to reflect the realities of his personality. For example, he considers himself to be a talented poet. He generally wears a small red hat, purple trousers, clogs and walks around with his pot belly visible from under his shirt.

Petersson has stated that Faló is inspired by Einar Lindberg's character Sympatiska Filip, from the strip Filip och Kaspersson. Sympatiska Filip was in turn based upon Elov Persson's character Kronblom. Petersson derived the name Faló from the Argentinian singer and guitarist Eduardo Falú.

The comic strip contains black humor. The original idea of the strip, hence the name, was to depict different people in various situations. However, the story was then shifted towards revolving around Faló.

Other characters in the burlesque depiction of small-town Sweden include (but are not limited to) the following:

- Yvette. Faló's long-suffering girlfriend/fiancé.
- Olaf. Faló's stunted, thick and occasionally criminal brother. He is often seen working as a waiter or chef. Olaf is Faló spelled backwards.
- Konrad Bernevik. The municipal commissioner and Faló's love-rival for Yvette. A devout Christian.
- Torsten Lydén. Faló's neighbour. A fanatic military officer who has a habit of declaring war on his neighbours. He later underwent a sex-change and now goes by the first name Totta.
- Stryp-Enok. Faló's other neighbour who carefully tends his precious garden (which is often destroyed through various mishaps, both accidental and intentional). A chain smoker.
- Börje Phyllerin, last name later changed to Finkelspiel. The town drunk. He changed his last name because people kept calling him Fylle-Börje ("Drunk-Börje") which is derived from Phyllerin.
- Desirée Rosenquick. A dim-witted little old lady who is often seen riding on her moped.
- Blirger Bidén. Faló's friend. He is constantly pushed around by his abusive wife. Blirger, Faló and some others friends often play poker together.
- Brunte. Faló's dog who often puts him in awkward situations.

== The comic book ==
The main strip, Uti vår hage, features in both newly drawn stories and in republished material. In addition, the comic book includes several subsidiary strips, a crossword and a letters page ("Tyckt å tänkt Uti vår hage").

=== Current subsidiary strips ===
- Axplock, by Tobias Sjölund
- Baldo, by Hector Cantú and Carlos Castellanos
- Elvis, by Tony Cronstam
- Folk & Fä
- Gaston, by André Franquin
- Lindström
- Moppe och mobilen
- Tristan

=== Previous subsidiary strips ===
- Kid Paddle
- Nilsson & Bengtsson, by Magnus Knutsson and David Öqvist
- Quarantän, by Camilla Eriksson
- Toftaligan
- Vi å pappa, by Krister Petersson and Gert Lozell
- Zorillerna
- Älskade hund, by Uli Stein
