= Sven-Bertil Bärnarp =

Swedish cartoonist (1940–2026)

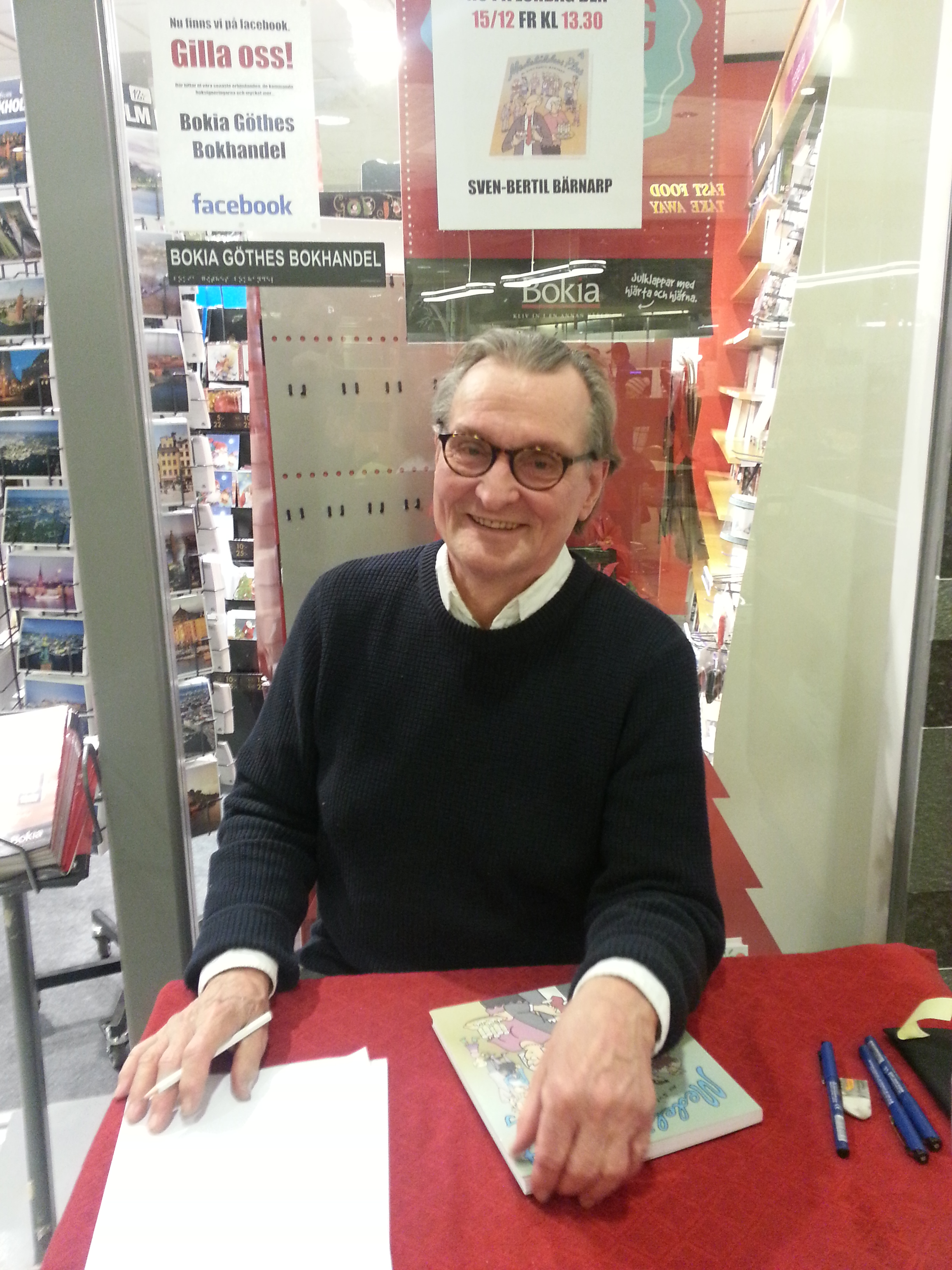
- Bärnarp in 2012
- Born: 16 January 1940; Gothenburg, Sweden
- Died: 28 August 2026 (aged 86)
- Occupation: Cartoonist

Sven-Bertil Bärnarp (16 January 1940 – 28 August 2026) was a Swedish cartoonist.

== Life and work ==
Bärnarp trained in graphic design and published a daily comic strip in Dagens Nyheter. He received an Adamson Award in 2008 for Best Swedish Cartoonist and was the 2014 recipient of the Stora Gerontologipriset.

Bärnarp died on 28 August 2026, at the age of 86.

== Publications ==
- Medelålders plus: en serie för oss! (2009–2011)
- Medelålders plus. Album nr 2 (2010)
- Medelålders plus. Album nr 3 (2011)
- Medelålders Plus. Album nr 4 (2012)
