= Halland Regiment =

Coordinates: 56°41′22″N 12°51′42″E

- Hallands regemente
- Active: 1624–1713, 1713–2000
- Country: Sweden
- Allegiance: Swedish Armed Forces
- Branch: Swedish Army
- Type: Infantry
- Size: Regiment
- Part of: 3rd Military District (1833–1893); 1st Army Division (1893–1901); I Army Division (1902–1927); Southern Army Division (1928–1936); I Army Division (1937–1943); III Military District (1943–1966); Western Military District (1966-1992); Southern Military District (1993-2000)
- Garrison/HQ: Halmstad
- Motto: Posse est velle ("To want is to be able to")
- Colors: Black and yellow (–1952), Blue and white (1952–2000)
- March: "Friedrich-Wilhelm-marsch" (Winter) (Note: The march was adopted in the late-1800s and established in 1953 by Army Order 33/1953. The march was used by the Halland Brigade (Hallandsbrigaden) from 1994 to 2000 and by the Halland Group (Hallandsgruppen) from 2000.)
- Battle honours: Lützen (1632), Leipzig (1642), Lund (1676), Gadebusch (1712)

Insignia
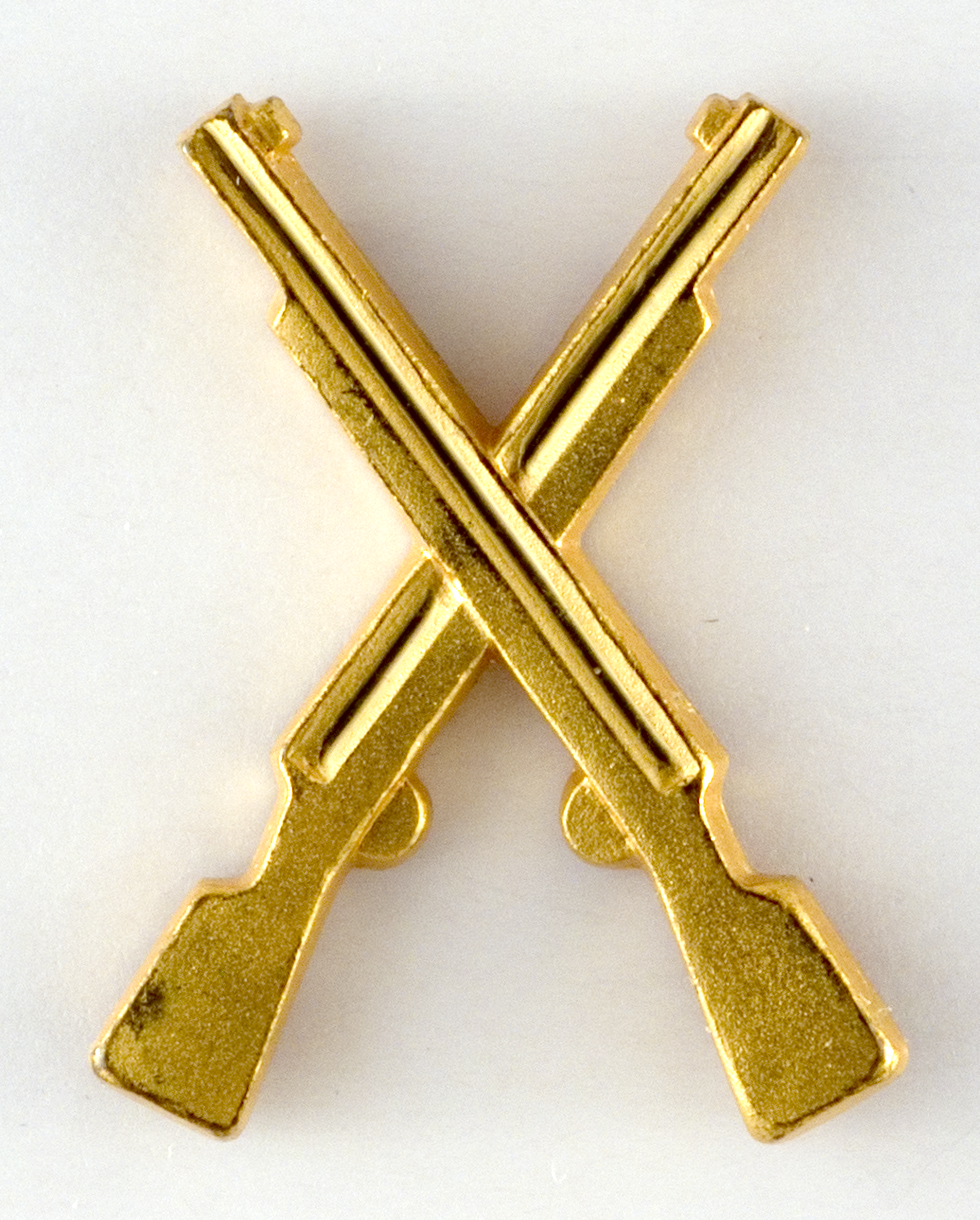
- Branch insignia m/60

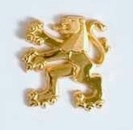
- Unit insignia m/60

The Halland Regiment (Swedish: Hallands regemente), designations I 16 and I 16/Fo 31, was a Swedish Army infantry regiment that traced its origins back to the 16th century. The regiment's soldiers were originally recruited from the provinces of Västergötland and Dalsland, but it was later garrisoned in Halland. The unit was disbanded as a result of the disarmament policies set forward in the Defence Act of 2000.

== History ==
The regiment has its origins in fänikor (companies) raised in Västergötland and Dalsland in the 16th century. In 1615, these units were organised by Gustav II Adolf into Västergötlands storregemente. Västergötlands storregemente consisted of three field regiments, of which Västgöta-Dals Regiment was one. Sometime between 1621 and 1624, the grand regiment was permanently split into three smaller regiments, of which Västgöta-Dals Regiment was one.

Västgöta-Dals Regiment was one of the original 20 Swedish infantry regiments mentioned in the Swedish constitution of 1634. The regiment's first commander was Wilhelm von Salzburg. It was allotted in 1685. The regiment was given the designation I 16 (16th Infantry Regiment) in a general order in 1816.

In 1902 the regiment changed recruitment area to Halland and was garrisoned in Halmstad. The name was changed to Halland Regiment to reflect this. In 1975, the regiment gained the new designation I 16/Fo 31 as a consequence of a merge with the local defence district Fo 31. The regiment was disbanded in 2000.

== Campaigns ==
- The Polish War (1600–1629)
- The Thirty Years' War (1630–1648)
- The Northern Wars (1655–1661)
- The Scanian War (1674–1679)
- The Great Northern War (1700–1721)
- The Seven Years' War (1757–1762)
- The Gustav III's Russian War (1788–1790)
- The Franco-Swedish War (1805–1810)
- The Finnish War (1808–1809)
- The Campaign against Norway (1814)

== Organisation ==
1685(?)

- Livkompaniet
- Överstelöjtnantens kompani
- Majorens kompani
- Sun- och Nordals kompani
- Tössbo kompani
- Kållands kompani
- Vedbo kompani
- Kullings kompani

1814(?)

- Livkompaniet
- Forssa kompani
- Järvsö kompani
- Delsbo kompani
- Färnebo kompani
- Arbrå kompani
- Alfta kompani
- Ovansjö kompani

== Heraldry and traditions ==
=== Colours, standards and guidons ===
On 7 June 1952, the regiment was presented with the first colour with the provincial badge of Halland. The 1952 colour was presented by Prince Bertil, Duke of Halland. Until 1952, the colours of the regiment had been the colour of Västergötland (black and yellow), though the regiment since 1906 was located in province of Halland. When the regiment received the "Hallandian" colour, the colour of Halland (blue and white) was adopted. The last regimental colour was presented to the regiment (I 16/Fo 31) in Halmstad by the Chief of Army Staff, lieutenant general Åke Sagrén on 7 July 1994. It was used as regimental colour by I 16/Fo 31 until 1 July 2000. The colour is drawn by Bengt Olof Kälde and embroidered by machine in insertion technique by the company Libraria. Blazon: "On blue cloth the provincial badge of Halland; a white lion rampant, armed red. On a white border at the upper side of the colour, battle honours (Lützen 1632, Leipzig 1642, Lund 1676, Gadebusch 1712) i blue."

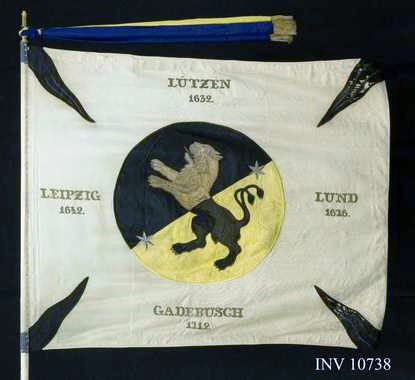
1850 regimental colour.

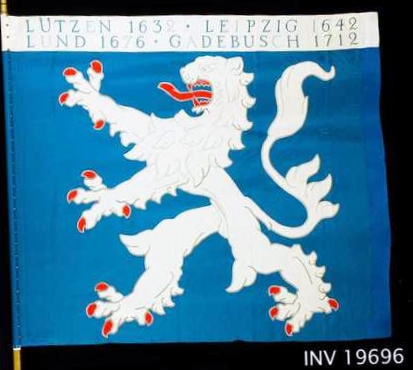
1952 regimental colour.

=== Coat of arms ===
The coat of the arms of the Halland Regiment (I 16/Fo 31) 1977–1994 and the Halland Brigade (Hallandsbrigaden, IB 16) 1994–2000. Blazon: "Azure, the provincial badge of Halland, a double-tailed lion rampant argent, armed and langued gules. The shield surmounted two muskets in saltire or". The coat of arms of the Halland Regiment (I 16/Fo 31) 1994–2000 and the Halland Group (Hallandsgruppen) since 2000. Blazon: "Azure, the provincial badge of Halland, a double-tailed lion rampant argent, armed and langued gules. The shield surmounted two swords in saltire or".

Coat of arms of the Halland Regiment (I 16/Fo 31) 1977–1994 and the Halland Brigade (Hallandsbrigaden, IB 16) 1994–2000.

Coat of the arms of the Halland Regiment (I 16/Fo 31) 1994–2000 and the Halland Group (Hallandsgruppen) 2000–present.

=== Medals ===
In 2000, the Hallands regementes (I 16) och Hallandsbrigadens (IB 16) minnesmedalj ("Halland Regiment (I 16) and Halland Brigade (IB 16) Commemorative Medal") in silver (HallregbrigSMM) of the 8th size was established. The medal ribbon is of blue moiré with a black stripe on the middle followed on each side by a yellow stripe, then a white stripe and last a red line.

=== Heritage ===
The Halland Group (Hallandsgruppen) is the traditional keeper of the regimental heritage and traditions, and organizes under the Air Defence Regiment (Lv 6). The Halland Group took over the colour and traditions in connection with the disbandment of the regiment and the brigade on 30 June 2000. From 1 July 2013, the traditions of the regiment will be continued by Halland Battalion (Hallands bataljon), part of the Halland Group.

=== Other ===
Rudolf Petersson, creator of the comic En beväringsmans upplevelser och äventyr ("A military man's experiences and adventures"), now 91:an, made his military service at Halland Regiment which is the model for Klackamo Heath, where Mandel Karlsson, 87:an Axelsson and the others in the 91:an comic book did their military service.

== Commanding officers ==
Regimental commanders active at the regiment 1924–2000. Göran Cunnighame was the first to be named regimental commander.

=== Commanders ===
- 10 March 1624: Welham von Salzburg (acting)
- 1625–1632: Göran Cunnighame
- 1632–1651: Nils Kagg
- 1651–1657: Johan Stake
- 1657–1660: Gustaf Oxenstierna
- 1660–1680: Vilhelm Jernsköld
- 1680–1691: David Macklier
- 1691–1705: Johan Fägerskiöld
- 1705–1716: Georg Reinhold Patkull (POW)
- 1710–1712: N Palmfelt (acting)
- 1713–1716: B C Wulfrath (acting)
- 1716–1732: Libert Rosenstierna
- 1732–1735: Johan Fredrik Didron
- 1735–1745: Karl Ollonberg
- 1745–1749: Karl Lillie
- 1749–1766: Erik Lybecker
- 1766–1769: Ulrik Scheffer
- 1769–1769: Klaes Kristoffer Ekeblad
- 1769–1770: Karl Gustav Strömschiöld
- 1770–1773: Joen Filip Klingspor
- 1773–1779: Abraham Daniel Schönström
- 1779–1785: Fredrik Posse
- 1785–1793: Gustav Cronhielm
- 1793–1796: Gustav Lewenhaupt
- 1796–1811: Karl Bunge
- 1811–1816: Carl Löwenhielm
- 1816–1817: Gustav Fredrik Vilhelm Gyllenram
- 1817–1838: Wilhelm Albrecht Dorchimont
- 1838–1847: Axel Vilhelm Ehrengranat
- 1847–1853: Polykarpus Erik Cronhielm
- 1853–1864: Klaes Samuel Sandels
- 1864–1871: Lage Evald Posse
- 1871–1882: Eggert Elers
- 1882–1890: Otto Taube
- 1890–1890: Pontus Henrik Vilhelm Reuterswärd
- 1890–1894: Karl Oskar Unaeus
- 1894–1902: Otto Vilhelm Löwenborg (namnbyte)
- 1902–1909: Karl Vilhelm Emanuel Ankarcrona
- 1909–1917: Emil Mörcke
- 1917–1926: Peter Hegardt
- 1926–1932: Reinhold Geijer
- 1932–1937: Gösta Bratt
- 1937–1938: Colonel Axel Gyllenkrook
- 1938–1940: Nils Bildt
- 1941–1944: Ivar Lindqvist
- 1944–1947: Henrik Wrede
- 1947–1951: M Hedenlund
- 1951–1954: P Lande
- 1954–1957: Carl Klingenstierna
- 1957–1959: Colonel Arne Mohlin
- 1959–1960: Colonel Tage Olihn
- 1960–1968: Nils Juhlin
- 1968–1976: Lage Wernstedt
- 1976–1980: Senior colonel Carl-Gustaf Tiselius
- 1980–1983: Gustaf Malmström
- 1983–1988: R Morell
- 1988–1993: G Wetterlundh
- 1993–1995: P Källström
- 1995–1996: P Jonsson
- 1996–1998: Senior colonel Mats Welff
- 1998–2000: Arne Hedman

=== Deputy commanders ===
- 1976–19??: Colonel Arne Månsson

== Names, designations and locations ==
Name	Translation	From		To
Kungl. Västgöta-Dals regemente	Royal Västgöta-Dals Regiment	1624-03-10	–	1713-05-06
Kungl. Västgöta-Dals regemente	Royal Västgöta-Dals Regiment	1713-??-??	–	1901-12-31
Kungl. Hallands regemente	Royal Halland Regiment	1902-01-01	–	1974-12-31
Hallands regemente	Halland Regiment	1975-01-01	–	1975-06-30
Hallands regemente och försvarsområde	Halland Regiment and Defence District	1975-07-01	–	2000-06-30
Avvecklingsorganisation Halland	Decommissioning Organisation Halland	2000-07-01	–	2001-03-31
Designation		From		To
№ 16		1816-10-01	–	1914-09-30
I 16		1914-10-01	–	1974-06-30
I 16/Fo 31		1975-07-01	–	2000-06-30
Location		From		To
Nygårdsängen		1685-??-??	–	1863-05-04
Grunnebo hed		1863-05-05	–	1906-09-30
Skedalahed		1903-07-01	–	1906-09-30
Halmstad Garrison		1906-10-01	–	2001-03-31

== See also ==
- List of Swedish infantry regiments
