= Tage Holmberg =

Swedish photographer (1913–1989)

- Born: 16 February 1913; Stockholm, Sweden
- Died: 29 August 1989 (aged 76); Stockholm, Sweden
- Other name: Tage Alexander Holmberg
- Occupation: Editor
- Years active: 1938 - 1954 (film)

Tage Holmberg (1913–1989) was a Swedish film editor. He also directed two films.

== Selected filmography ==
- The Two of Us (1939)
- Oh, What a Boy! (1939)
- Home from Babylon (1941)
- Fransson the Terrible (1941)
- Johansson and Vestman (1946)
- Sunshine Follows Rain (1946)
- It Rains on Our Love (1946)
- A Ship Bound for India (1947)
- Crime in the Sun (1947)
- The Girl from the Marsh Croft (1947)
- Don't Give Up (1947)
- Private Karlsson on Leave (1947)
- Life at Forsbyholm Manor (1948)
- Loffe as a Millionaire (1948)
- Bom the Flyer (1952)
- Hidden in the Fog (1953)

== Bibliography ==
- Vermilye, Jerry. Ingmar Bergman: His Life and Films. McFarland, 2002.
