= Johan Wanloo =

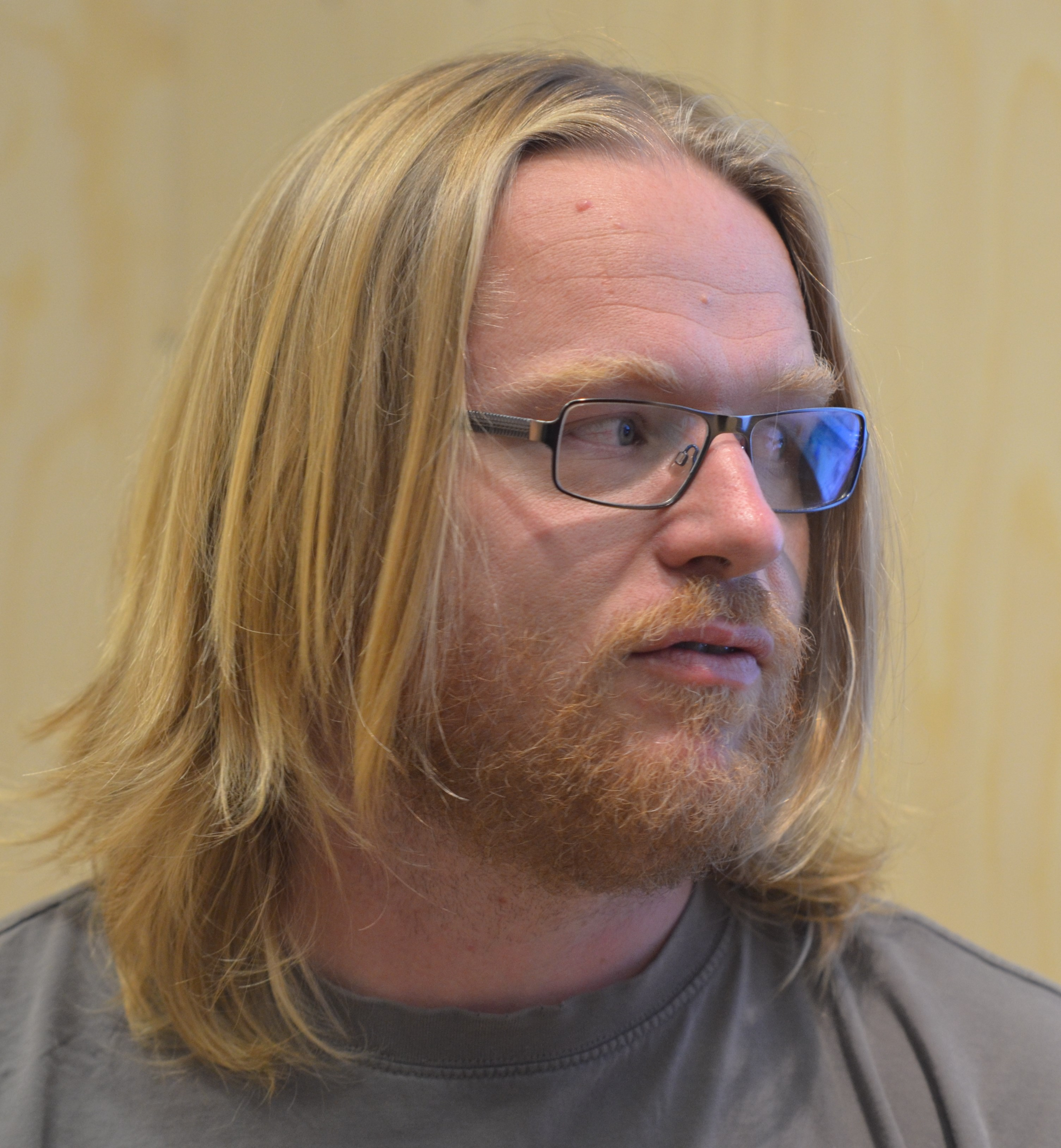
- Johan Wanloo during the 2013 Gothenburg Bookfair.
- Born: July 16, 1972 (age 54) Gothenburg, Sweden
- Areas: Cartoonist, Writer, Penciller, Letterer
- Notable works: Swedish Mad, De äventyrslystna karlakarlarna, Rock Manlyfist
- Awards: Adamson Award

Johan Wanloo (born July 16, 1972, in Gothenburg, Sweden) is a comic book creator known for his many comic strips published in newspapers, tabloids, and magazines including the Swedish version of MAD Magazine. His career started in 1987 when he sold a cartoon to the computer magazine Svenska Hemdatornytt.

Many of his comics involve satire of those he perceives to be pretentious or out of touch with regular people. Usually this includes snobs and people with radical political beliefs. He greatly dislikes Goth and indie culture and claims that he has "the musical taste of a 60-year old".

He is a fan of retro-kitsch and likes to incorporate this into his work. Many of his comics are parodies/homages of old pulp fiction and he has even done a number of strips where he alters original artwork to make new stories.

== Works ==
Wanloo mostly does strips featuring himself where he comments on society, but he has also created a number of original characters including

- De äventyrslystna karlakarlarna (The adventurous manly-men)

A parody of classic pulp fiction starring the two famous "alpha males" Felix Gimlet and El Fjongo. Felix is the playboy genius while Fjongo is a wrestler who always wears a Lucha libre-style mask.

- Örn Blammo

A violent, possibly psychotic government agent who saves the world alongside his two kid sidekicks.

- Farbror Einar (Uncle Einar)

Comic strip about a grumpy, sadistic old man.

- Kapten Klara

A relatively straightforward children's comic series about the adventurous eye-patched sea captain Klara and her anthropomorph crocodile friend Harry, aboard the submarine Gudrun.

- Fwedewic
- Roy vid Rymdkommandot (Roy at Space-command)
- Rock Manlyfist - Master of Space Karate

On a personal level, Wanloo once said that his idol is Charlton Heston. Despite being nearly 2 meters tall, he usually draws himself quite short. He used to be heavily into splatter films.
