= Nina Hemmingsson =

Swedish cartoonist

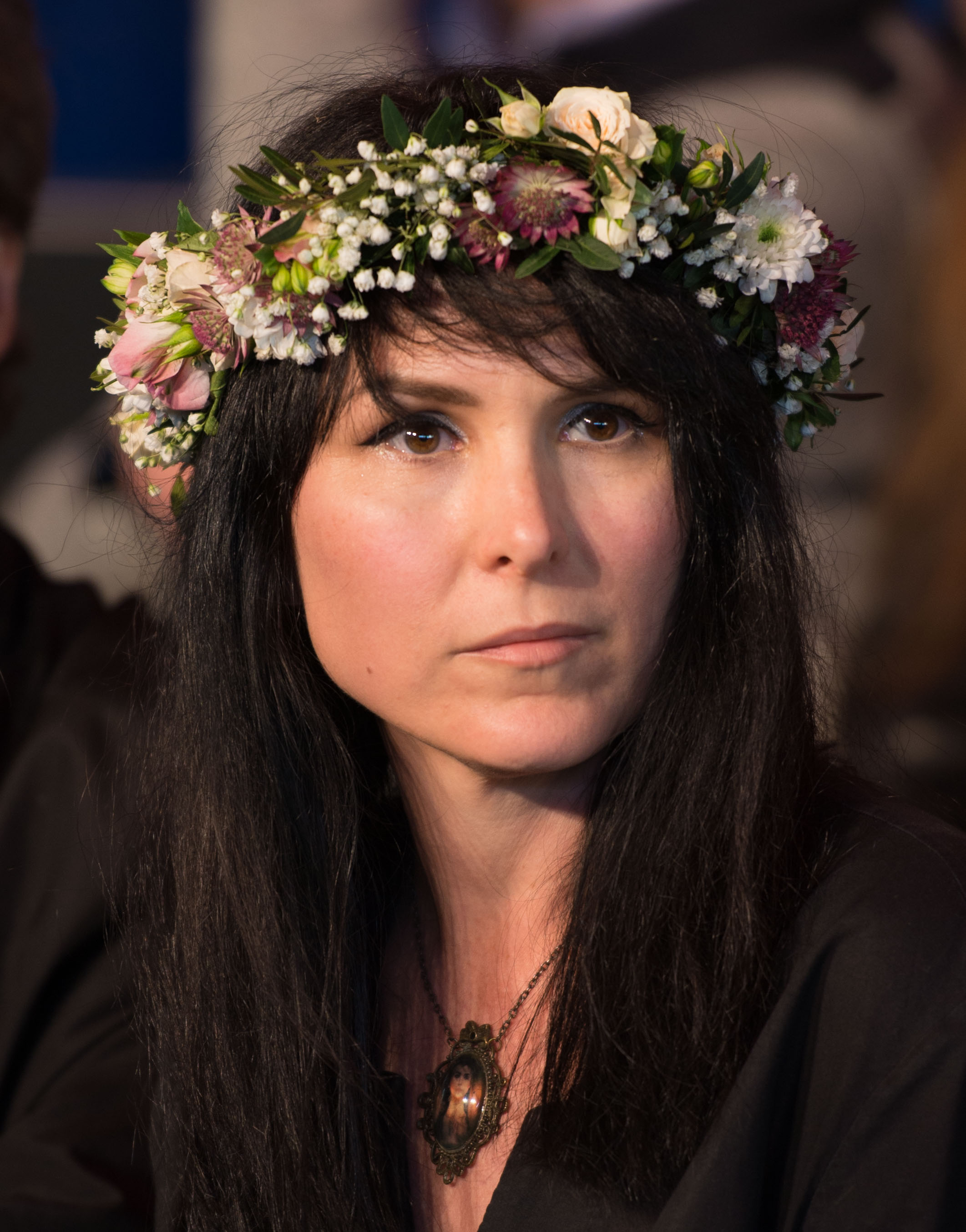
- Hemmingsson in 2015
- Born: 30 November 1971 (age 54); Uppsala, Sweden
- Occupation: Cartoonist

Nina Hemmingsson (born 30 November 1971) is a Swedish cartoonist. She draws foremost shorter comics, often single-panel cartoons featuring political and social criticism. An example of Hemingsson's work is Bäst i början ("Best in the Beginning"). Her work has been published in the magazines Galago and Bang, the Uppsala student newspaper Ergo, and the newspaper Aftonbladet. She has also released three books, Hjälp! ("Help!"), Jag är din flickvän nu ("I'm Your Girlfriend Now"), and Demoner - ett bestiarium ("Demons - a Bestiary") for the publisher Ruin. Ahead of the 2010 wedding of Victoria, Crown Princess of Sweden, and Daniel Westling she made an anti-royalistic cartoon called "Prinsessan & Gemålen" for Aftonbladet.

Nina Hemingsson got her education at Kunstakademien in Trondheim in Norway and is currently living in Aspudden.

== Cartoons ==
- 2004 – Hjälp!: serier. Stockholm: Kartago. ISBN 91-89632-19-2
- 2006 – Jag är din flickvän nu. Stockholm: Kartago. ISBN 91-89632-58-3
- 2007 – Roos, Harry; Hemmingsson Nina. Demoner: ett bestiarium. Stockholm: Ruin. ISBN 978-91-85191-28-4 (inb.)
- 2007 – Edlund, Ann-Catrine; Erson Eva, Milles Karin, Hemmingsson Nina, Frödin Ulf. Språk och kön. Stockholm: Norstedts akademiska förlag. ISBN 978-91-7227-452-5 (inb.)
- 2008 – Jonsson Mats, Mohr Sanna, Wedberg Sannie, red. Tilt: serier om droger och alkohol. Stockholm: ALMAeuropa. ISBN 978-91-7037-413-5
- 2009 – Teckningar och skisser. Malmö: Seriefrämjandet. ISBN 978-91-85161-48-5
- 2009 – Så jävla normal: teckningar 2006-2009. Stockholm: Kartago. ISBN 978-91-86003-24-1
- 2009 – Bild & Bubbla #177. Seriefrämjandet. ISBN 91-85161-47-0
- 2010 – Nyberg Andreas, red. Den totalt förbjudna dassboken. Sundbyberg: Semic. ISBN 978-91-552-5631-9
- 2011 – Mina vackra ögon. Kartago Förlag. ISBN 91-86003-76-3 (inb.)
- 2012 – Det var jag som kom hem till dig. Stockholm: Atlas. ISBN 978-91-7389-414-2
- 2012 – Nina Hemmingsson almanacka 2014. Kartago Förlag. ISBN 9789175150284
- 2013 – Nina Hemmingsson almanacka 2014. Kartago Förlag. ISBN 9789175150284
