= Joakim Pirinen =

Swedish illustrator, author, and comic creator

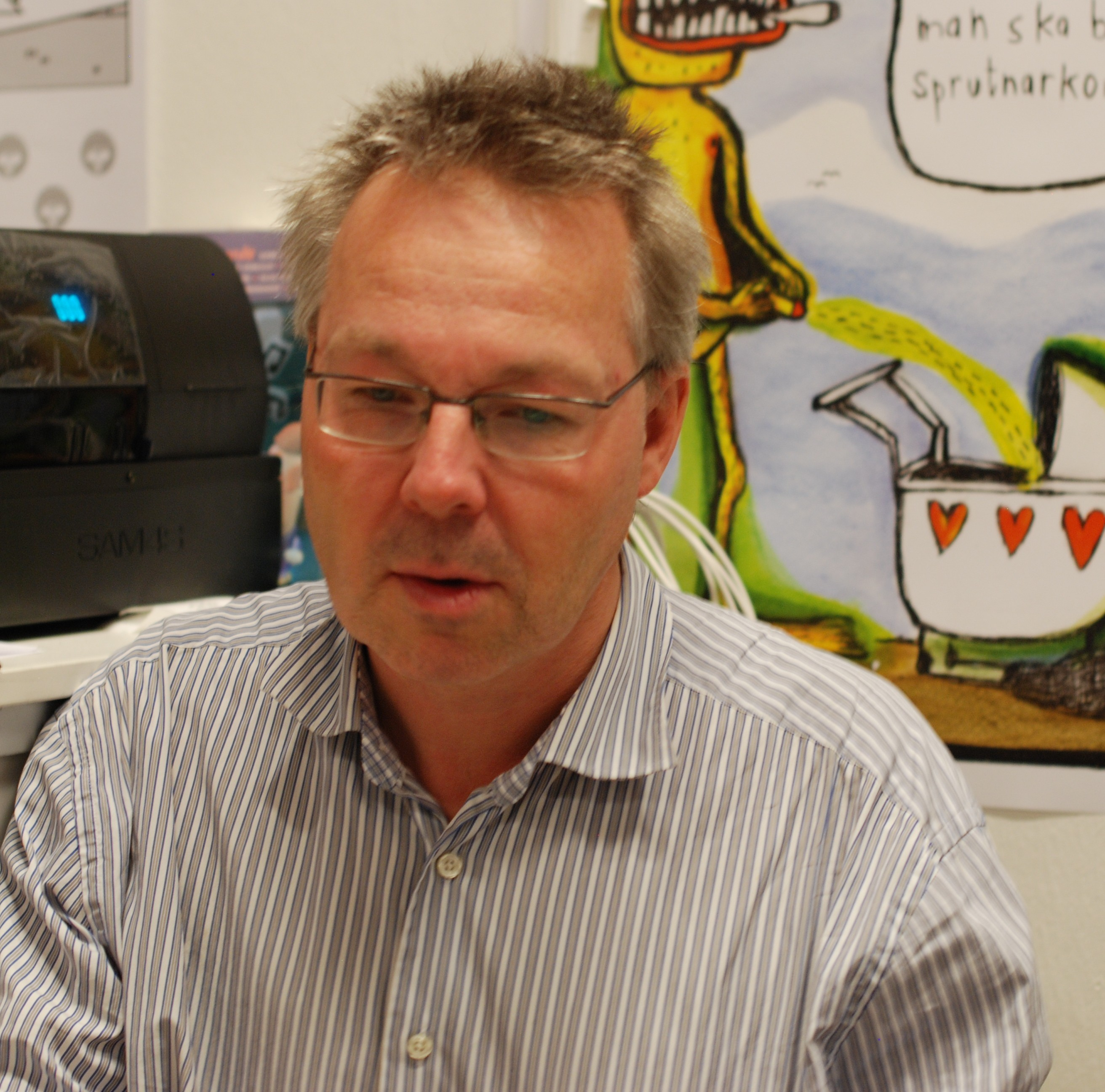
Joakim Pirinen.

Joakim Pirinen (born 28 May 1961 in Solna, Stockholm County) is a Swedish illustrator, author, and comic creator. He made his debut during the 1980s wave of "artistic" and "adult" comics in Sweden, Pirinen was, and still is, a regular contributor to the Swedish alternative comics magazine Galago.

Pirinen's comic album debut came in 1984 with Välkommen Till Sandlådan ("Welcome to the Sandbox"), but his true breakthrough came with Socker-Conny ("Sugar-Conny") in 1985, a graphic novel about an anarchistic borderline personality.

== Personal life ==
Pirinen is of Finnish descent through his father who was sent to Sweden as a Finnish war child during World War II.
