= Jan Berglin =

Swedish cartoonist

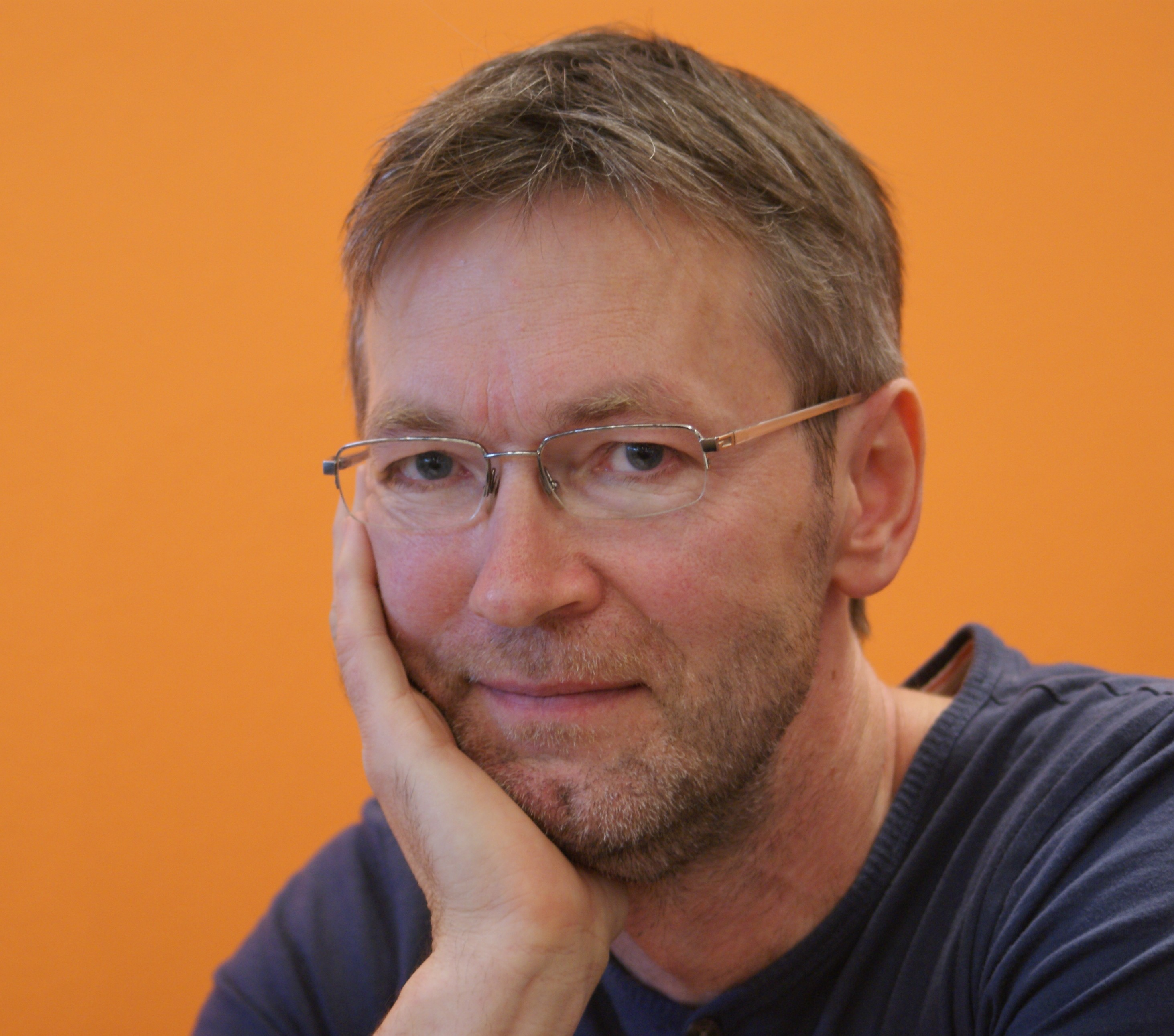
Jan Berglin in 2011.

Jan Berglin (born March 24, 1960) is a Swedish cartoonist who made his debut in the Uppsala student newspaper Ergo in 1985. After completing his studies, Berglin has been living in Gävle where he works as a teacher of Swedish and religion. He published his early strips in the local social democratic newspaper Arbetarbladet, but became known to a wider audience in 1995, when he started to draw for the Stockholm-based but nationally distributed conservative newspaper Svenska Dagbladet. His strips have been collected and republished in several albums.

Berglin's strips, usually in four panels, tend to find their humour in a sometimes absurd mix of everyday situations and literary and philosophical references or reflections. When he was awarded the Alf Henrikson Prize in 2004, the jury's motivation spoke of his renditions of the "existence of the everyday human between ideals and matter".

In later years Berglin has acknowledged the input of his wife Maria Berglin, an artist and literary critic, within his strips by signing them "Berglins".

== Albums ==
- Samlade serier ("Collected comics") (1992)
- Avanti! – Serier för förryckta (1995)
- Mitt i currykrysset – serier mot sekelslutsleda (1997)
- Andra bullar! (1998)
- Knektöppning – Ess i topp (1999)
- Magnum Berglin: Samlade teckningar 1989-1999 ("Collected drawings 1989-1999") (2001)
- Lagom Berglin (2002)
- Pytte Berglin (2003)
- Berglinska Tider (2004)
- Berglin nästa (2006)
- Berglins Tolva ("Berglin's Twelfth") (2007)
- Berglin den trettonde : samlade teckningar av Jan och Maria Berglin ("Berglin the Thirteenth: drawings by Jan and Maria Berglin") (2008)
- Varje dag man inte köper pizza är en seger ("Every day you don't get pizza is a victory") (2009)
- Berglin den trettonde, Kartago 2008 (with Maria Berglin)
- Någon ser dig när du petar näsan Galago, 2010 (with Maria Berglin)
- Bronto Berglin, Galago 2011 (with Maria Berglin) (samlade serier 1999–2008)
- Den speciella & den allmänna vardagsteorin, Bonnier Fakta, 2012 (with Maria Berglin)
- Det är den som möter som ska backa, Wahlström & Widstrand, 2013 (with Maria Berglin)
- Berglins stora bok om kropp & hälsa, Wahlström & Widstrand, 2014 (with Maria Berglin)
- Mitt i rondellen, Wahlström & Widstrand, 2014 (with Maria Berglin)
- Det sista rotavdraget, Wahlström & Widstrand, 2015 (with Maria Berglin)
- God Jul Luj Dog – samlade julteckningar, Wahlström & Widstrand, 2015 (with Maria Berglin)
- Serier från andra våningen, Wahlström & Widstrand, 2016 (with Maria Berglin)
- Kaos är granne med Bjällermalms Natur och Kultur, 2017 (with Maria Berglin)
- Nämenvaf…, Natur och Kultur, 2018 (with Maria Berglin)
- Nya bokstavskombinationer, Natur och Kultur, 2019 (with Maria Berglin)
- Samtidsrysningar, Natur och Kultur, 2020 (with Maria Berglin)
- Berglins Guld: De bästa serierna från 2009–2019, Kartago 2021 (with Maria Berglin)
- Bland pannben och styrkekramar, Kartago 2021 (with Maria Berglin)
