= Rudolf Petersson =

Swedish comic creator

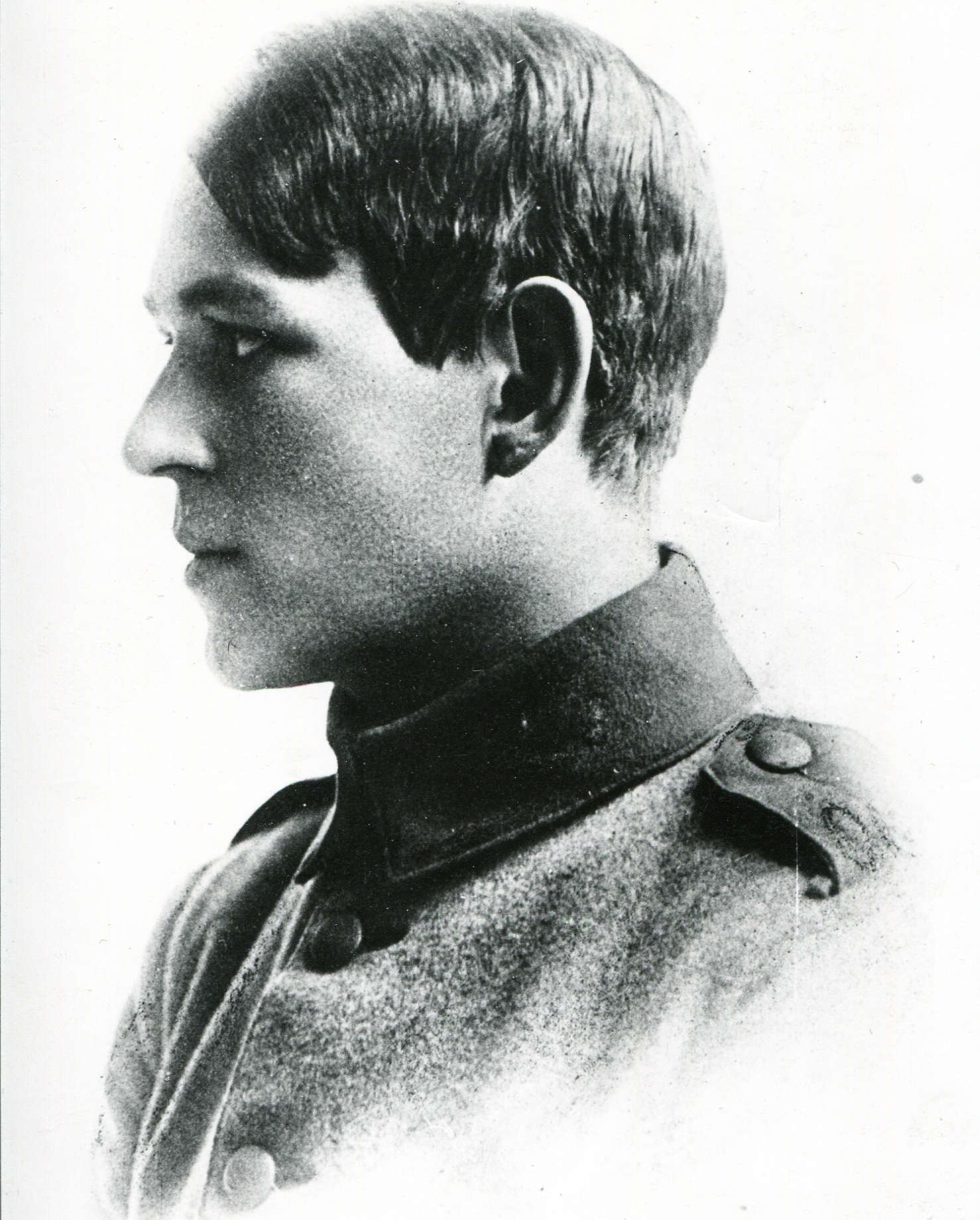
- Born: June 17, 1896 Halmstad, Sweden
- Died: April 17, 1970 (aged 73)
- Area: Cartoonist
- Notable works: 91:an

Rudolf Petersson (17 June 1896 – 17 April 1970) was a Swedish comic creator and the father of one of the most popular Swedish comics of all time: 91:an.

Petersson performed national service at the I 16 regiment in Halmstad, Halland, between 1916 and 1918. Mandel Karlsson, the protagonist of 91:an, is based on two people Petersson met during his national service at I 16 — a blond and ill-tempered Smålandian who was turned soft by accordion music, and a friendly, short haired person. Some of the attributes were switched and the result was 91:an and another character, 87:an Axelsson. Several of the officers in 91:an are also based on real people Petersson met during his service.

== See also ==
- 91:an (comic strip)
- 91:an (comic book)
- Mandel Karlsson
