= Nils Egerbrandt =

Swedish comic creator

Nils Egerbrandt (born 11 May 1926 in Stockholm, died 4 February 2005) was a Swedish comic creator who created a few children's comics in the 1950s, such as Olli, about an adventurous eskimo boy.

Later, he took over the popular Swedish comic strip 91:an from Rudolf Petersson, which he continued to work with until his death in 2005.
