= 91:an =

Swedish comic book

- 91:an cover, May 2005

Publication information
- Publisher: Åhlén & Åkerlunds Youth Magazines (1956–1963); Semic Press (1963–1997); Egmont Kärnan AB (1997–present)
- Schedule: Biweekly
- Format: Ongoing series
- Genre: Humor/comedy
- Publication date: 1956
- No. of issues: 595 (as of August 2021)
- Main character(s): Mandel Karlsson; Åsa-Nisse; Kronblom

Creative team
- Written by: Leif Bergendorff
- Editor: Karin Wahlund Franck

91:an (Eng: № 91) is a popular bi-weekly Swedish comic book published by Egmont Kärnan AB. First brought out in 1956, it primarily publishes comic strips by Swedish cartoonists.

Although it is read by some younger children it is mainly aimed at teenagers and adults, with 72% of its current readership aged 20 or over. Total readership is approximately 278,000.

The current editor is Karin Wahlund Franck.

== Featured comic strips ==
The principal cartoon strip is 91:an, whose principal character, Mandel Karlsson, is a young man (aged perhaps 20 or 21) doing conscribed military service in the Swedish Army. His number is "91", thus he is widely known in Sweden as "91:an Karlsson", although in the modern comic strip itself he is almost always referred to as Mandel (Eng: Almond, an extremely unusual first name), or simply as "91:an".

From the very first edition two other strips have featured in every edition: Åsa-Nisse (which has also had its own comic book, periodically, since 1960) and Kronblom.

=== Historic line up ===
Other strips which have had runs in the comic are:

- Acke (the American strip Archie)
- Adamson (a Swedish strip which went on to great success in the United States, and worldwide, renamed as Silent Sam and Adamson's Adventures)
- Agust
- Biffen och Bananen
- Flygsoldat 113 Bom
- Frisk och Rask
- Geniet
- Herr Larsson
- Historiska historier
- Jönsson-Ligan
- Knallhatten (the American strip Li'l Abner)
- Lilla Fridolf (now has its own comic book)
- Livet hemmavid
- Olle Bull (the American strip Oaky Doaks)
- Sputnik
- Svenne Gurka
- Tuffa Viktor (the English strip Andy Capp)
- Uti vår hage (now has its own comic book)
- Vimmelgrind
- Vi å pappa (now published as an Annual)
- Vår lilla stad

=== Current line up ===
- 91:an
- Åsa-Nisse
- Kronblom
- Livet hemmavid
- Ferguson (every second issue)
- Lilla Fridolf (occasional)
- Flygsoldat 113 Bom (occasional)

== 91:an mot väggen ==
One of the key features of the comic is a remarkable readers' letters section, covering 2 pages, called 91:an mot väggen or Ställ 91:an mot väggen (Eng: Put No. 91 up against the wall). Here, one of the longest serving writers, Leif Bergendorff, replies to letters in an open and informative manner.

== See also ==
- 91:an (comic strip)
- Mandel Karlsson
