= Svenska Serieakademien =

Swedish comics organisation

Svenska Serieakademin ("The Swedish Academy of Comics") is a Swedish organisation founded in 1965 by the journalist Sture Hegerfors, who has been its president from the start. The academy is based on the structure of the Swedish Academy and has 18 members, just like its prototype, but is aimed at the art of comics. Among the members are Lasse Åberg.

The academy awards the Adamson statuette every year to one international and one Swedish comics creator. The statuette is named for the comic strip Adamson, in English known as Silent Sam or Adamson's Adventures.

== See also ==
- Adamson Awards
