= Kronblom =

- Kronblom Christmas album from 1978.
- Author: Elov Persson
- Current status/schedule: Running
- Launch date: 17 July 1927
- Publisher: Semic
- Genre: Humor

Kronblom is a popular Swedish comic strip created by Elov Persson in 1927. It is published biweekly in Sweden in the comic book 91:an, along with a number of other comic strips, and in the weekly magazine Allers.

Elov's son, Gunnar Persson, took over the comic strip in 1968 when his father died. Jonas Persson, Gunnar's son, started drawing the comic strip in 2006 together with his father.

== Characters and story ==
Kronblom is a man in his sixties who lives with his wife Malin in the fictional Swedish village "Vinkelboda" (partly based on Elov Persson's home village Torsåker). He is recognizable by his long nose and lanky body. He's also bald and often wears a blue hat. Kronblom has an aversion to work, which is why he's constantly broke. He spends most of his days sleeping on the kitchen sofa, much to the anger of Malin. To avoid chores given to him by her, he goes fishing or hunting. Kronblom hates his mother-in-law. When she comes to visit, he plays pranks on her so she will leave.

== History ==
In 1927, Elov Persson sent in his draft for a new comic strip to the publisher Åhlén & Åkerlunds. Persson, who had previously worked on the comic strip Kaspersson in the magazine Smålänningen, wanted to be able to support himself on his comic strips. He hoped that his bald character with a long nose (later named Kronblom) would be appreciated by Åhlén & Åkerlunds, and the first Kronblom strip was published in the weekly magazine Allt för Alla on July 17, 1927 in Sweden.

The strip became an instant success, and in 1932 it moved to the Swedish magazine Året Runt. In 1987, it moved to another Swedish magazine, Allers, where it is still published. The strip can also be found in the Swedish comic book 91:an, which is published biweekly.

A Christmas album of Kronblom has been published in Sweden every year since 1930, that contains all Kronblom comic strips published that same year in Allers and 91:an.

Elov's son, Gunnar Persson took over the comic strip in 1968 when his father died. In 2006, Gunnar's son, Jonas Persson, started drawing the comic strip together with his father.

A weekly Kronblom comics magazine was created in 1997, but was canceled after four issues due to poor sales.

Kronblom has been the mascot of the Swedish association football team Örebro SK since 1987.

== Kronblom in other media ==
Two live action films based on the strip have been made in Sweden. The first, entitled Kronblom, was released in 1947. Kronblom kommer till stan (English: Kronblom comes to the city) was released in 1949.

During the 1950s, a show about Kronblom, written by Gits Olsson, aired on the radio in Sweden.

== Awards ==
In 1966, Elov Persson won an Adamson Award in the "Best Swedish comic-strip (or comic book) cartoonist" category for his comic strips Kronblom and August och Lotta. Gunnar Persson won an award in the same category in 1981 for his work on Kronblom.

== See also ==
- List of comic strips
- Åsa-Nisse
- 91:an (comic strip)
