= Gunnar Persson =

Swedish cartoonist

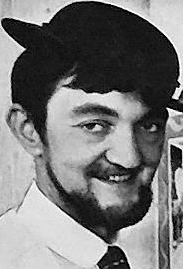
Gunnar Persson in 1968

Gunnar Persson (13 October 1933 – 8 April 2018) was a Swedish cartoonist and comic creator. He was the son of Elov Persson, creator of one of Sweden's oldest comic strip characters, Kronblom. Gunnar began drawing the Kronblom comic strip in 1968 when his father's health got worse. Prior to Kronblom, Gunnar Persson had already drawn the comic strips Gus and Herr Larsson in the comic book 91:an.
