= Lena Ackebo =

Swedish comic creator (born 1950)

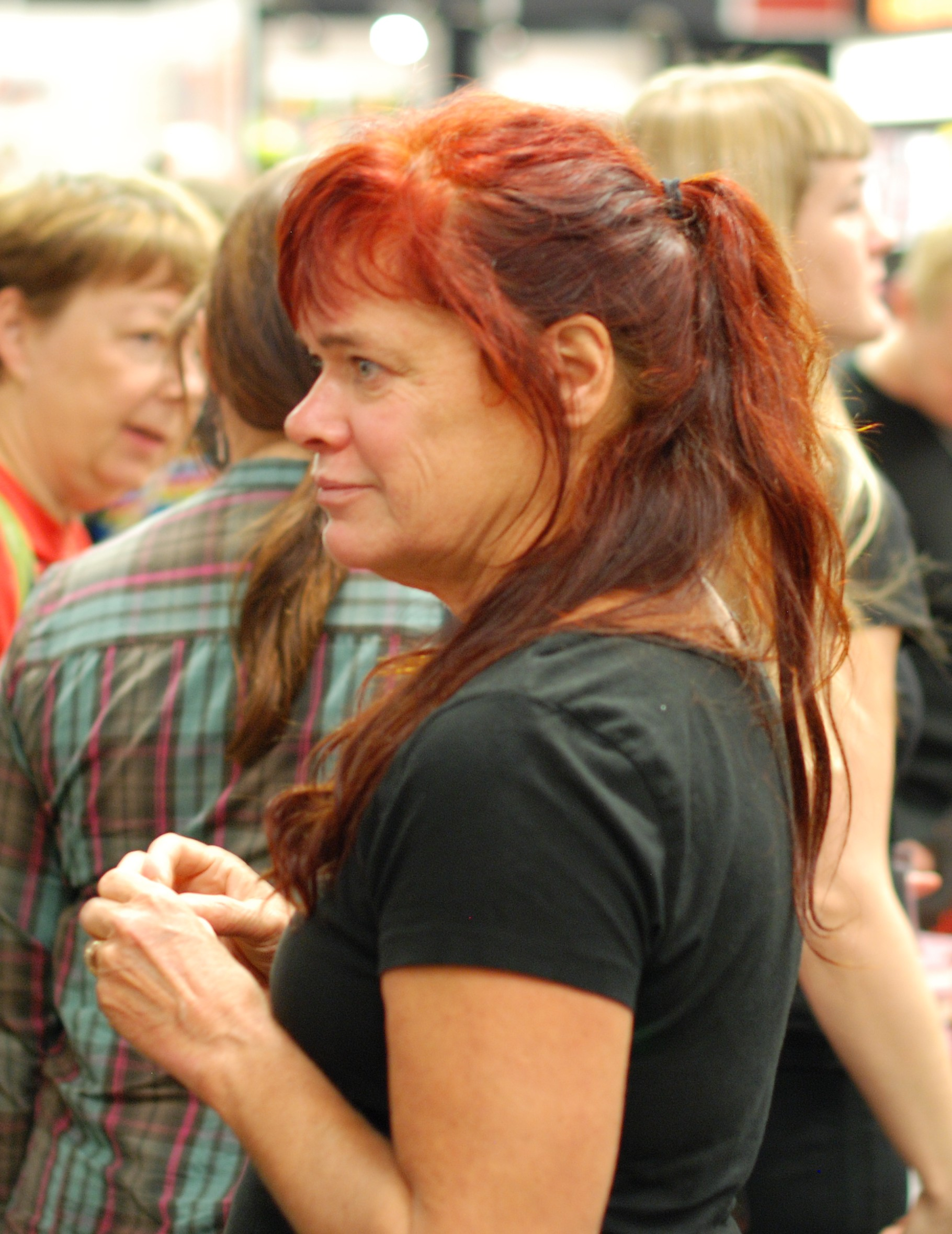
Lea Ackebo at the Gothenburg Book Fair in September 2010

Lena Ackebo (born 1950) is a Swedish comic creator who has been published in daily strip form, in albums, and in the art magazine Galago since the mid-1980s. Having a very distinct and graphic style, Ackebo mainly does satirical comics depicting the Swedish society. Since 2014, she has completely switched to writers and debuted with the world's most beautiful man in 2016 who received an independent follow-up in Dear Barbro in 2017.
