= Elov Persson =

Swedish comic artist

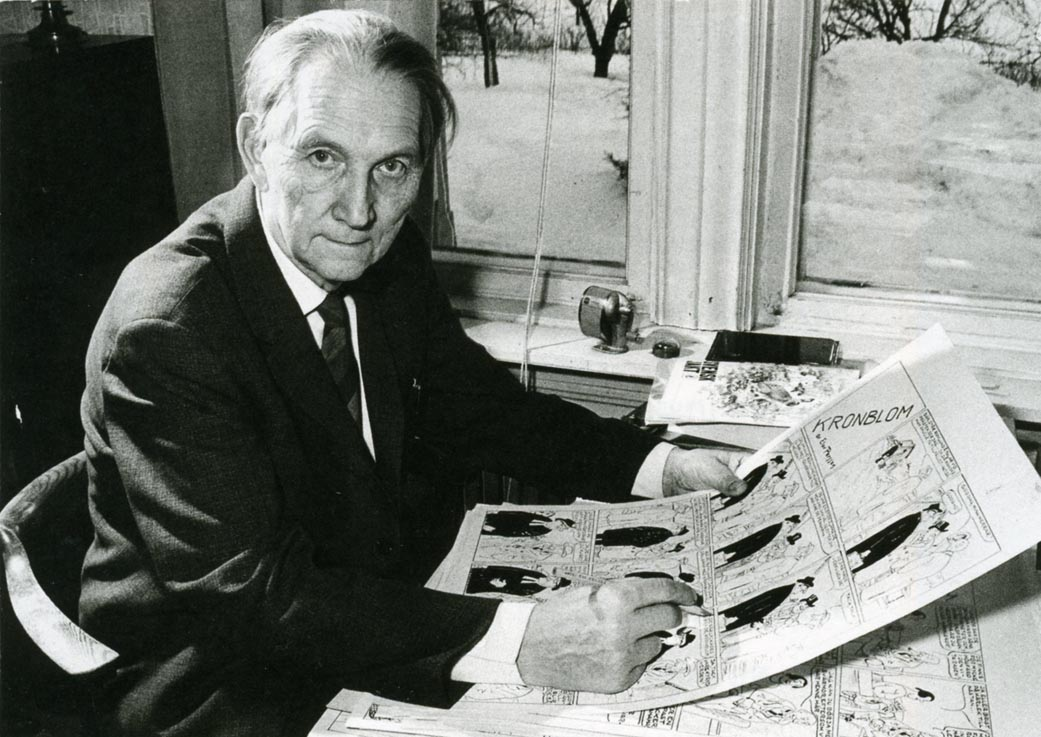
- Elov Persson by the mid 1960's
- Born: 10 July 1894; Hästbo, Torsåker, Gästrikland, Sweden
- Died: 9 July 1970 (aged 75); Torsåker, Gästrikland, Sweden
- Occupations: Cartoonist, comic artist
- Known for: Kronblom, Agust och Lotta
- Spouse: Signe Tjerneld (m. 1922)
- Children: 4

Elov V Persson (10 July 1894 – 9 July 1970) was a Swedish comic artist. He created one of Sweden's most popular comic strips, Kronblom.

Born in Hästbo, a dispersed settlement in Hofors Municipality, Gästrikland, Elov Persson created Kronblom in 1927 and the strip was published in the magazine Vårt Hem. A year after the creation of Kronblom, Persson created another comic strip, Agust och Lotta (August and Lotta).

Kronblom was such a part of Sweden's popular culture that two live-action film versions were produced, Kronblom in 1947 and Kronblom kommer till stan in 1949, with popular star Ludde Gentzel, 62 years old at the time of the first film's production, playing the slow-moving, but quick-thinking title character. Persson appeared in the first film playing an unbilled cameo as himself.

Elov Persson died in Torsåker, one day before his 76th birthday. In subsequent years, his son Gunnar continued Kronblom, while Agust och Lotta was continued by his other son, Ingvar (1930–2015).
