= Silent Sam (comics) =

Silent Sam (Adamson)

Publication information
- First appearance: October 17, 1920
- Created by: Oscar Jacobsson (1920)

In-story information
- Alter ego: Adamson
- Species: Human

Silent Sam (Adamson) is a Swedish pantomime comic, created by Oscar Jacobsson (1889–1945) in 1920. It has also been published under the name Adamson's Adventures.

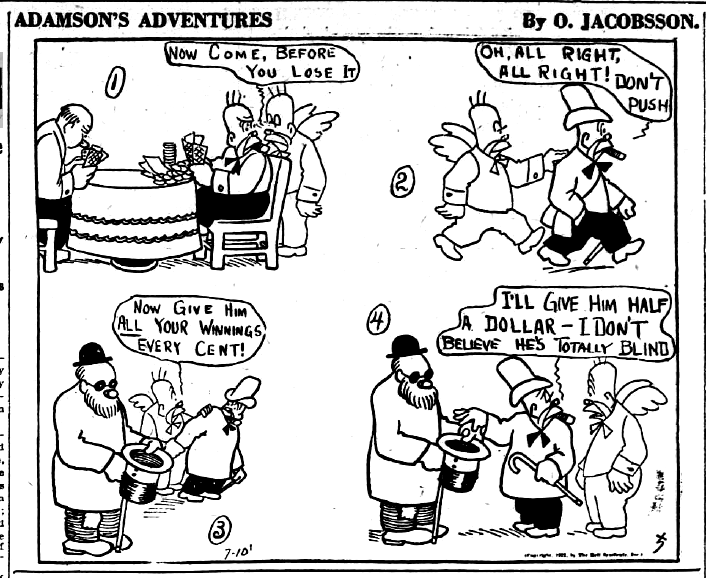
Adamson's Adventures strip, from 1922.

== Description ==
Adamson is a silent, grumpy looking, cigar-smoking man with an odd high hat. The strip originally appeared in the Swedish humor publication Söndags-Nisse, where it debuted on October 17, 1920. Adamson is an almost pure pantomime comic, and he spoke extremely rarely and instead expressed himself with mimic and gestures.

The fact that he almost never uttered a word, was one of the benefits of the comic, making it feasible internationally.

It soon became very popular and was published in hundreds of newspapers all over the world, not only in Sweden but also in the rest of Europe, the US, China and Japan.

Oscar Jacobsson was resident in the United States for eight months in 1922 and during the long visit sold the series for syndication to the PIB syndicate. Soon the comic, which in the United States was usually called Silent Sam, came to be a success.

The popularity of Adamson was certainly due to the fact that the figure had a specific and easily recognisable appearance – small in size, bald but for three hairs, grumpy looking with a half-smoked cigar in the mouth. Adamson also ended up in situations that, though exaggerated, many readers could identify with.

In the United States, the comic also went under the name Adamson's Adventures, and this version was handed over to Henry Thol in 1935, followed by Jeff Hayes in 1941–54.

After Jacobsson died in 1945, Adamson was drawn by the Dane Viggo Ludvigsen until its demise in 1964.

The character is thought to have been one of the inspirations for the creation of Homer Simpson, since his creator, Matt Groening, has said that old comic strips, show and documentaries like Middletown, from 1982, have been used as inspiration for The Simpsons.

== Adamson Award ==
In 1965, the year after the production of the comic ceased, Svenska Serieakademien (The Swedish Academy of Comics) founded the Adamson Award in Jacobsson's honor. This award is awarded to one Swedish and one international comic creator every year. The prize consists of a wooden sculpture representing Adamson.
