= Mats Jonsson (cartoonist) =

Swedish comic creator (born 1973)

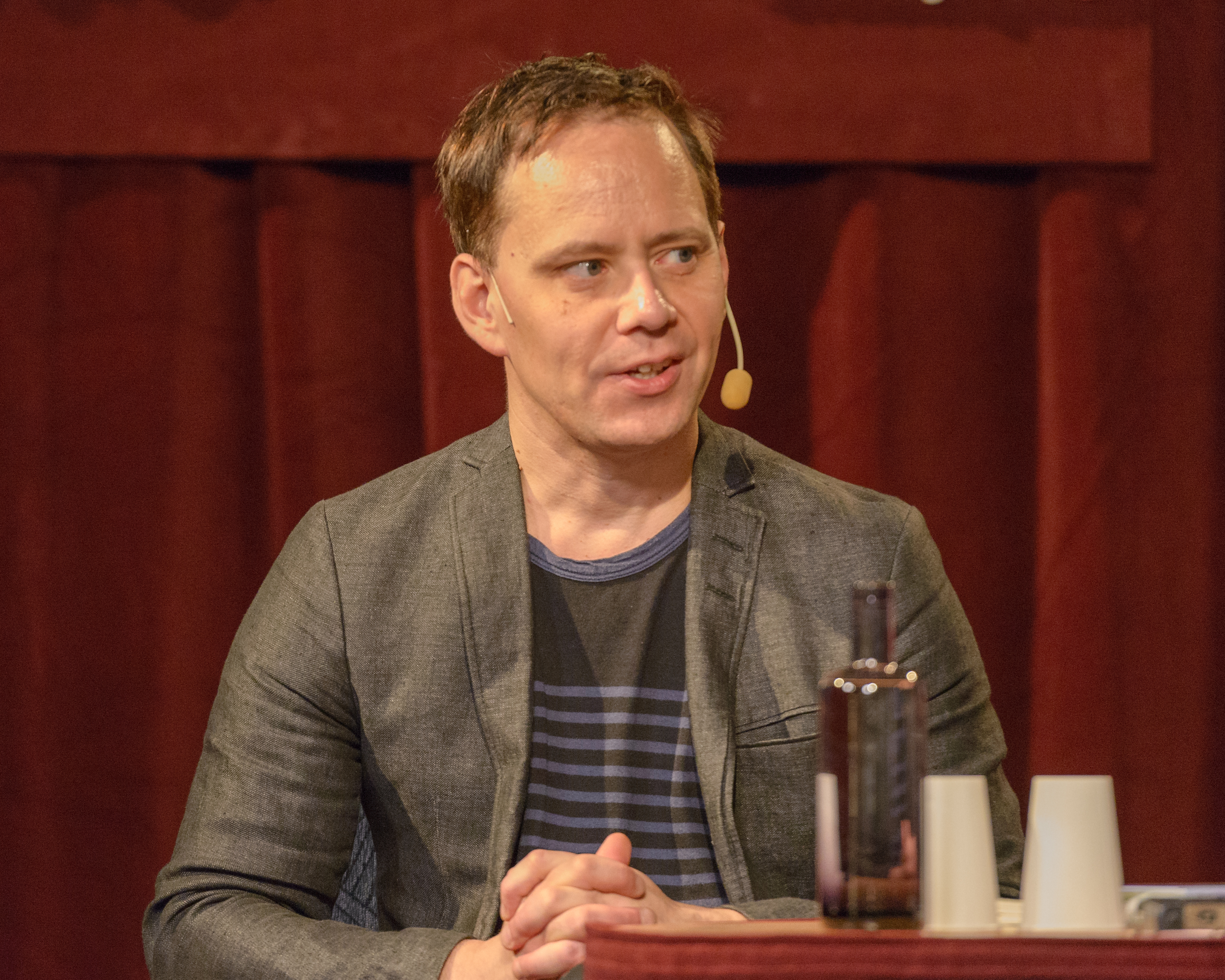
Jonsson at Gothenburg Book Fair in 2014

Mats Jonsson (born 1973) is a Swedish comic creator. Debuting as a teenager in the Swedish fanzine society, Jonsson later became one of the prime Swedish representants for the autobiographical comic genre, inspired by American and Canadian comic creators such as Harvey Pekar, Seth, and Joe Matt.

Though born in Södertälje near Stockholm, Jonsson grew up in the northern Ådalen area in Kramfors Municipality. His previous graphic novels have portrayed the depopulation of his hometown, the urban-rural divide and his annoyance with Stockholm (where he lived between 1995 and 2020) and Stockholmers. In his latest work, När vi var samer (also the first graphic novel to be nominated for the August Prize) he examines his own Forest Sami ancestry and the actions of the Swedish state in Sápmi.

Mats Jonsson has been published in several Swedish newspapers and magazines. Many of his works have been collected in albums.

Currently, Jonsson is the editor of the Swedish cultural magazine Galago.
