= Året Runt =

Weekly Swedish women's magazine

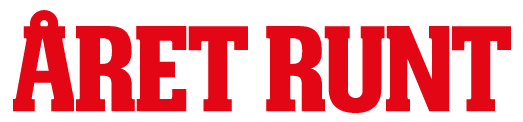
- Former editors: Gunny Widell
- Categories: Women's magazine
- Frequency: Weekly
- Publisher: Aller Förlag AB
- Founded: 1946
- Company: Aller Media
- Country: Sweden
- Based in: Malmö
- Language: Swedish
- Website: Året Runt
- ISSN: 0400-2334
- OCLC: 186424836

Året Runt (Swedish: All Year Around) is a weekly women's and family magazine published in Malmö, Sweden. Founded in 1946 it is one of the longest-running magazines in the country.

== History and profile ==
Året Runt was started by Åhlén & Åkerlunds förlag (today Bonnier AB) in 1946. During the initial period the magazine targeted rural readers. Gunny Widell served as the editor-in-chief of the magazine. Another family magazine, Vårt Hem, merged with Året Runt in 1951. Året Runt began to include a TV section from 1960.

Bonnier sold Året Runt to its rival company Aller Media due to poor circulation levels in the mid-1980s. The magazine is published by Allers Förlag AB on a weekly basis. The headquarters of Året Runt moved from Stockholm to Malmö in January 2016. The magazine featured interviews with both famous personalities such as Ingmar Bergman and other women figures.

== Circulation ==
Året Runt sold 60,000 copies in its first year, 1946. From 1951 to 1994 it was the best-selling family magazine in Sweden. The magazine reached its peak circulation in 1955 with 498,000 copies and also enjoyed higher levels of circulation in the 1960s and 1970s.

The circulation of the magazine was 181,300 copies in 2006. Next year the magazine became the fifth best-selling magazine in Sweden with a circulation of 172,700 copies. Its circulation was 153,200 copies in 2011. In 2014 the magazine sold 135,200 copies.
