= Galago (magazine) =

Swedish alternative comics magazine

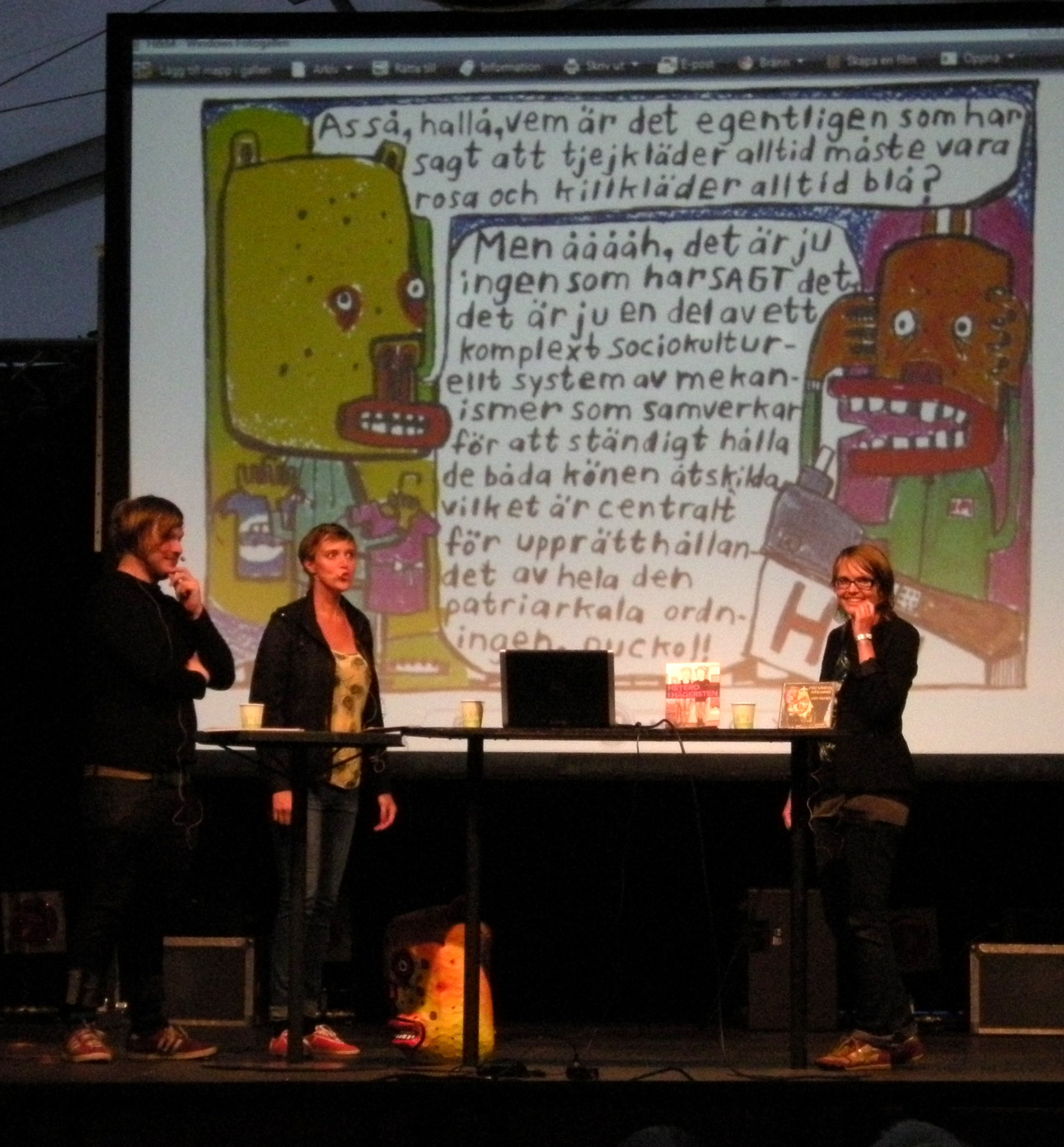

Galago is a Swedish comics and illustrations magazine published in Sweden. It specializes in alternative comics, and has traditionally had a left-leaning slant.

== History and profile ==
Galago was created in 1979 by Rolf Classon, Olle Berg and Kerold Klang. The magazine was first published by Tago Publishers and later by Atlantic Publishing. The publisher is Ordfront. It appears with four issues per year. The headquarters is in Stockholm.

The present editor (as of 2020) is Rojin Pertow. With issue 136 Galago celebrated its 40th anniversary in 2019.
