= 2022 in comics =

Notable events of 2022 in comics, including any relevant comics-related events, deaths of notable comics-related people, conventions and first issues by title.

== Events ==
=== January ===
- January 15: Original artwork of Spider-Man's first appearance in his black costume, by Mike Zeck, is auctioned at Heritage Auctions for a record-breaking US $3.36 million.
- January 27:
  - In Belgium new passports are distributed, featuring imagery from famous Belgian comics inside.
  - A school board in Tennessee bans Art Spiegelman's Maus from its classrooms, which they claim is because it contains some nudity and eight curse words. The ban causes global outrage and sales of Maus rise.

=== March ===
- March 8: In the British comic magazine The Beano, the gag comic series Stevie Star, Mahira of the Match and Sketch Khad, by Andy Fanton, make their debut. In June, the protagonists of these series, namely Stevie Star, Mahira and Khadija, join the cast of The Bash Street Kids too.
- March 17: A new album of Gaston Lagaffe (Gomer Goof) by the late André Franquin is announced for the fall of 2022, drawn by Canadian artist Marc Delaf. However, by 16 May, the estate of Franquin, led by his daughter Isabelle, sues publishing company Dupuis over copyright infringement and plagiarism. As a direct result the potential release of the album is postponed.

=== April ===
- April 15: Former Studio Vandersteen artist Marc Verhaegen publishes his graphic novel Het Beest Is Los, a semi-autobiographical story in which he indirectly criticizes his former colleagues and bosses.

=== June ===
- June 5: The Adventures of Nero by Marc Sleen receives a comic mural in Hoeilaart.
- June 16: In Amsterdam, The Netherlands, a sculpture depicting Argus the rat journalist from Marten Toonder's comic series Tom Poes, designed by Saske van der Eerden, is unveiled at the Nieuwezijds Voorburgwal.
- June 26: In Nieuw-Vossemeer, The Netherlands, a bench commemorating the comic characters Bulletje en Boonestaak, is revealed to the public.

=== July ===
- July 8: In Brussels, Belgium, a comic mural is inaugurated, designed by Léonie Bischoff, as part of the Brussels' Comic Book Route.
- July 9: Dutch comic artist Aiméé de Jongh wins the annual Stripschapprijs. Colorist Marloes Dekkers receives the P. Hans Frankfurtherprijs.

=== September ===
- September 9: Judith Vanistendael becomes the second woman to win the Bronzen Adhemar award.
- September 15: Zarya of the Dawn, a comic book written by Kris Kashtanova and illustrated with the artificial intelligence software Midjourney, receives copyright protection from the United States Copyright Office. Copyright for the artwork would later be revoked in February 2023.
- September 19 The newspaper comic Dilbert by Scott Adams is dropped from an estimated 77 newspapers after plotlines in the strip parodied environmental, social, and corporate governance (ESG) strategies. Part of the plotline involved an African-American character who "identifies as white", and the company management asking him if he could also identify as gay.
- September 28: Dutch cartoonist Jip van den Toorn is the first woman and the youngest cartoonist ever in general to win the Inktspot Award.

=== October ===
- October 26:
  - The long-running Belgian comic series Urbanus by Willy Linthout and Urbanus publishes their final album, also marks the end of the series after 40 years. Linthout does launch a new comic series, De Familie Super.
  - The third posthumous The Adventures of Nero story, De Hemeltergers, is published, scripted by Kim Duchateau and drawn by Dirk Stallaert.

=== December ===
- December 13: The website ARREST sur images reports that in 2017, on Facebook, French comic artist Bastien Vivès posted very personal and offensive verbal attacks and threats, directed at comic artist Emma. The revelation causes huge controversy.
- December 14: The International Comics Festival of Angoulême cancels an upcoming exhibition devoted to comic artist Bastien Vivès, after controversy over some of his remarks about colleague Emma, and the content of some of his graphic novels, which some critics consider child pornography. The organizers of the festival received too many death threats and claim they can't guarantee the safety of the festival goers if the expo about Vivès went on as planned.
- December 17: The long-running Belgian comic series Suske en Wiske, which ran in papers since 1945, publishes its final episode in the papers. It will no longer be serialized in De Standaard, De Gentenaar and Het Nieuwsblad. However, new albums will still be published in the future.
- December 27: The long-running Belgian comic series De Kiekeboes, which ran in papers since 1977, will publish its final episode in the papers. It will no longer be serialized in Gazet van Antwerpen and Het Belang van Limburg. However, new albums will still be published in the future.
- December 31:
  - The final episode of the newspaper comic Funky Winkerbean by Tom Batiuk appears in print.
  - British comic artist David Sutherland, best known for his work in The Beano, receives an OBE medal.

=== Specific date unknown ===
- Katie Silagadze designs the comic strip on the album cover of Bleeding Indigo by Moku J.

== Deaths ==
=== January ===
- January 7: Tony Tallarico, American comic artist (Lobo, Great Society Comic Book, Bobman and Teddy, Jigsaw), dies at age 88.
- January 10: Shinji Mizushima, Japanese manga artist (Yakyū-kyō no Uta, Dokaben, Abu-san), dies at age 82.
- January 11:
  - Orlando Busino, American cartoonist and comic artist (Gus, worked for Archie Comics), dies at age 95.
  - Guy Mouminoux, AKA Dimitri, Dimitri Lahache, Guy Sajer, French writer, comic writer (wrote scripts for Jean Valhardi) and artist (Goutatou et Dorochaux, Le Chevalier au Blason d'Argent, Les Familleurreux, Prémolaire, Krampon, Les Aventures de Rififi, Le Goulag, continued Blason d'Argent), dies at age 94.
- January 14: Ron Goulart, American comics writer (wrote scripts for Marvel Comics, Star Hawks and TekWar), author and historian (The Adventurous Decade: Comic Strips in the Thirties, Comic Book Culture: An Illustrated History, The Great Comic Book Artists, Focus on Jack Cole, Ron Goulart's Great History of Comic Books, The Encyclopedia of American Comics, The Comic Book Reader's Companion, Masked Marvels and Jungle Queens: Great Comic Book Covers of the '40s, The Funnies: 100 Years of American Comic Strips, Comic Book Encyclopedia: The Ultimate Guide to Characters, Graphic Novels, Writers and Artists in the Comic Book Universe, Alex Raymond: An Artistic Journey, Adventure, Intrigue and Romance), dies at age 90.
- January 18
  - Narayan Debnath, Indian comic artist (Handa Bhonda, Bantul the Great, Nonte Phonte), dies at age 96.
  - Michelangelo La Neve, Italian comics writer (Dylan Dog, Martin Mystère), dies at age 62.
- January 11: Paul Ausloos, Belgian photographer, graphic artist and painter (worked on the celebrity comic Het Manneke), dies at age 95.
- January 23: Jean-Claude Mézières, French comic artist (Valérian et Laureline), dies at age 83.
- January 26: Julio Radilović, Croatian comic artist (Herlock Sholmes, Partizani), dies at age 93.

=== February ===
- February 1: Brian Augustyn, American comic book editor and writer (The Flash, Gotham by Gaslight, Imperial Guard), dies at age 67.
- February 5: Ian Kennedy, British comics artist (worked on Dan Dare, Ro-Busters, Judge Dredd), dies at age 89.
- February 8: Borivoj Dovniković, A.K.A. Bordo, Croatian animator and comic artist (Velika Utakmica, celebrity comics based on the TV bear Mendo Mendovic), dies at age 91.
- February 9: Kazuyoshi Torii, Japanese manga artist, dies at age 75.
- February 10: Mino Milani, Italian comic artist, dies at age 94.
- February 11: Mel Keefer, American cartoonist (Mac Divot, continued Rick O'Shay), dies at age 95.
- February 12: Bill Woodman, American cartoonist, dies at age 82.
- February 18: Tom Veitch, American comic book writer (The Light and Darkness War, Animal Man, Star Wars), dies at age 80.
- February 21: Miguel Gallardo, Spanish comic book author (Makoki, worked for El Víbora), dies at age 66.
- February 26: Antonio Seguí, Argentine cartoonist, dies at age 88.
- February 27: Dick Guindon, American cartoonist, dies at age 86.

=== March ===
- March 3: Stu Goldman, American editorial cartoonist (Eavesdrawings), dies at age 74.
- March 7: Mia Ikumi, Japanese manga artist (Tokyo Mew Mew, Super Doll Licca-chan), dies at age 42.
- March 15: Fred de Wit, Belgian painter and comic artist (Marnix van Sanmarty), dies at age 75.
- March 22: Stan Mott, American cartoonist (known for drawing eccentric vehicles, The Absolute Alliance), dies at age 89.
- March 24: Erik Vandemeulebroucke, Belgian cartoonist and comic artist (Jim Lont, Dobberman en Van Geyt, worked for Karel Verschuere and later Rolf Kauka), dies at age 79.
- March 25: Birago Balzano, Italian cartoonist (Zora), dies at age 86.
- March 26: Garry Leach, British comic book artist (M.A.C.H. 1, Warpsmith, worked on Judge Dredd, Tharg's Future Shocks, Dan Dare), dies at age 67.

=== April ===
- April 7: Motoo Abiko (half of the creator duo Fujiko A. Fujio), Japanese manga artist (Doraemon, Ninja Hattori-kun, The Monster Kid, The Laughing Salesman), dies at age 88.
- April 8: Stelio Fenzo, Italian comic artist (Jungla, continued Capitan Cormorant), dies at age 89.
- April 11: Calvi, French cartoonist, dies at age 83.
- April 19: Marco Innocenti, Italian comic writer and artist (worked for the magazine Schizzo), dies at age 56.
- April 21: Clive Collins, British cartoonist, dies at age 80.
- April 23:
  - Daniel Bardet, French comic writer (Malefosse, Les Chemins de Malefosse, Timon des Blés, Le Boche), dies at age 79.
  - Justin Green, American comic artist (Binky Brown Meets the Holy Virgin Mary), dies at age 76.
- April 28: Neal Adams, American comic book artist (Batman, Superman vs. Muhammad Ali, Green Lantern), dies at age 80.

=== May ===
- May 3: Luca Boschi, Italian comic writer and artist (Remorenzo Rizzuto, Gozo, Disney comics), dies at age 66.
- May 6: George Pérez, American comic book artist (The Avengers, Crisis on Infinite Earths, Teen Titans) and writer, dies at age 67.
- May 7: Henk van Faassen, Dutch graphic artist and comic artist (made comics for the magazine Haak In), dies at age 90.
- May 9: Fred Carter, American comic book artist (Christian comics for Jack Chick), dies at age 83.
- May 30: Jacques Nicolaou, French comic artist (continued Placid et Muzo), dies at age 91.

=== June ===
- June 1: Serge Diantantu, Congolese-French comic artist (Petite Djily), dies at age 62.
- June 5: Dick Vlottes, Dutch cartoonist and comic artist (Hinter en Minter, Senmoet de Egyptenaar, De Krek, worked for Marten Toonder), dies at age 89.
- June 14: Everett Peck, American animator and comic artist (Duckman), dies at age 71.
- June 15: Patrick van Gelder, Belgian co-organizer of the Brabants Stripspektakel comic festival, dies at age 57.
- June 16: Tim Sale, American comic book artist (Batman: The Long Halloween, Batman: Dark Victory, Superman for All Seasons), dies at age 66.

=== July ===
- July 4
  - Remco Campert, Dutch poet and columnist (made comics and cartoons for the magazines Mandrill, Het Parool, Haagse Post, NRC Handelsblad), dies at age 92.
  - Kazuki Takahashi, Japanese manga artist (Yu-Gi-Oh!), dies at age 60.
- July 7: R.C. Harvey, American cartoonist and comic historian (The Art Of The Funnies, The Art of the Comic Book), dies at age 85.
- July 8: Wendell Washer, American animator and comic artist (Piffles the Barbarian, Zar, Gene Toons), dies at age 75.
- July 10: Tom Kane, American sports cartoonist, dies at age 87.
- July 20: Alan Grant, British comic writer (Judge Dredd, Strontium Dog, Outcasts, The Last American, Lobo, Anarky), dies at age 73.
- July 23: Paul Coker, American illustrator, animator and comic artist (Mad Magazine, Horrifying Clichés, Lancelot, Horace and Buggy), dies at age 93.
- July 28: Ron Zimmerman, American comedian and comic writer (Marvel Comics, wrote stories for Spider-Man, The Punisher, Captain Marvel, Rawhide Kid, dies at age 64.

=== August ===
- August 9: Raymond Briggs, British writer, illustrator, cartoonist and graphic novelist (Father Christmas, Ethel & Ernest), dies at age 88.
- August 11: Jean-Jacques Sempé, French cartoonist, illustrator and comic artist (Le Petit Nicolas), dies at age 89.
- August 18: Tom Palmer, American comic artist and inker (Marvel Comics), dies at age 81.
- August 20: Patrick Nordmann, French journalist, comedian, radio presenter and comic writer (wrote two Lucky Luke stories), dies at age 73.
- August 21: Oliver Frey, AKA Clint, AKA Zack, Swiss-British illustrator and comic artist (Terminal Man, Rogue, The Street, continued The Trigan Empire and Dan Dare), dies at age 74.
- August 24: Lily Renée, Austrian-American children's book author, playwright and comic artist (Jane Martin, The Werewolf Hunter, The Lost World, Señorita Rio, Abbott & Costello comics, Elsie the Cow comics), dies at age 101.
- August 27: Francisco Martín Morales, AKA Martínmorales, Spanish comic artist (Polícleto, Casimiro el Caco, La Monocloaca), dies at age 76.

=== September ===
- September 1:
  - Jack Marchal, French activist, musician and comic artist (Les Rats Maudits), dies at age 75.
  - Diane Noomin, American comic artist (DiDi Glitz, co-founder of Twisted Sisters), dies at age 75.
- September 10:
  - Rob Harren, Dutch comic publisher (founder of comic publishing company De Boemerang) and chief editor of the comic magazines Kuifje and Suske en Wiske Weekblad), dies at age 78.
  - Eric Jones, American comic artist (Little Gloomy), dies at age 51.
- September 3: Alarico Gattia, Italian comics artist (worked on Diabolik, Tex Willer), dies at age 94.
- September 22: François Corteggiani, French comics writer (wrote for Pif le chien, Peter O'Pencil, Capitan Rogers, Silas Finn, Bastos et Zakousky, Chafouin et Baluchon, La Jeunesse de Blueberry, Tatiana K., De Silence et de Sang, L'École Abracadabra, Disney comics, The Adventures of Alix, Lefranc, Les Pieds Nickelés, Sibylline, Marine, Smith & Wesson), dies at age 69.
- September 27: Vincent Deporter, AKA Vince Deporter, Belgian comics artist (Roméo, Crazy Planet, Les Fourmidables, assisted on Michel Vaillant, drew SpongeBob SquarePants comics), dies at age 63.

=== October ===
- October 3: Kim Jung Gi, South Korean illustrator and comic artist (Tiger the Long Tail, SpyGames, McCurry, NYC, 911), dies at age 47.
- October 11: Lazo Sredanović, Serbian comics writer and artist (Dikan), dies at age 83. .
- October 14: Alfredo Chiappori, Italian comic artist (Up Il Suvversivo), dies at age 79.
- October 18: Jean Teulé, French novelist, illustrator, TV screenwriter and comic artist (The Suicide Shop), dies at age 69.

=== November ===
- November 1: George Booth, American cartoonist (worked for The New Yorker) and comic artist (Spot, Local Item), dies at age 96.
- November 3: Dan Bulanadi, Filipino-American comic artist (Captain Canada, worked for Marvel) and inker, dies at age 76. .
- November 4: Eric Cougrand, French rock drummer and comic artist (designed a Cheap Thrills parody for an expo about Robert Crumb), dies at age 58.
- November 5: Roger Mahoney, British comic artist (continued The Gambols and Andy Capp), dies at age 89.
- November 7: Kevin O'Neill, British comic artist (Nemesis the Warlock, Marshal Law, The League of Extraordinary Gentlemen), dies at age 68 or 69.
- November 9: Carlos Pacheco, Spanish comic artist (Arrowsmith, worked for Marvel Comics and DC Comics), dies at age 60.
- November 11: Pierre Fournier, Canadian comic writer (worked on Michel Risque and Red Ketchup) and artist (Captaine Kébec), dies at age 72. .
- November 22: Vic Carrabotta, American comic artist (drew horror comics for Atlas Comics), dies at age 93.
- November 25: Laurent Gillain, AKA Lorg, Belgian comic writer and artist (assistant to his father Jijé, worked on Jean Valhardi, Jerry Spring, Barbe-Rouge, Tanguy et Laverdure), dies at age 66.
- November 28: Aline Kominsky-Crumb, American comic artist (Twisted Sisters, Dirty Laundry Comics) and chief editor (Weirdo), dies at age 74.
- November 30: Vicente Ramos Fernández, Spanish comics artist (Chispa), dies at age 91 or 92.

=== December ===
- December 3: Tim Kennedy, American comic artist (worked on Archie Comics), dies at an unknown age.
- December 6: Don Orehek, American editorial cartoonist, illustrator and comic artist (the Shut Up series in Cracked), dies at age 94.
- December 8: Lee Lorenz, American illustrator, editorial cartoonist and art editor (The New Yorker), dies at age 90.
- December 14: Han Peekel, Dutch comics scholar, singer and TV presenter (hosted the comics and cartoons-themed documentary TV show Wordt Vervolgd), dies at age 75.
- December 15: Calpurnio, Spanish poster artist, animator, illustrator, veejay and comics artist (Cuttlas), dies at age 63.
- December 30: Maurice Horn, French-American comics historian, writer, editor (Comics of the American West, The World Encyclopedia of Comics, The World Encyclopedia of Cartoons, Sex in the Comics, Contemporary Graphic Artists, 100 Years of American Newspaper Comics) and curator, dies at age 91.
- December 31: Heinrich Banemann, German illustrator and comics artist (Kreuzfahrt), dies at age 77.

== Exhibitions and shows ==
- May 9–July 15: "[Re]Framing Graphic Medicine: Comics and the History of Medicine" (Special Collections Research Center Exhibition Gallery, University of Chicago) — featuring "serialized prints, illustrated newspapers and magazines, comic books, zines, digital comics and graphic memoirs," curated by Brian Callender and André G. Wenze
- July 7–July 29: "Sequential Synergy: The Art of the Comic" (440 Gallery, Brooklyn, New York) — featuring the work of Josh Neufeld, Karl Stevens, and Onur Tukel, among others; curated by Dean Haspiel and Whitney Matheson
- September 6–December 4: "American Alternative Comics, 1980–2000: Raw, Weirdo, and Beyond" (Daley Family Gallery, McMullen Museum of Art, Boston College, Boston, Massachusetts) — "showcases over 120 works by forty artists," including Peter Bagge, Lynda Barry, Mark Beyer, Robert Crumb, Julie Doucet, Gilbert Hernandez, Jaime Hernandez, Keith Knight, Aline Kominsky-Crumb, Françoise Mouly, Gary Panter, Art Spiegelman, Chris Ware, and Jim Woodring; curated by John McCoy and Andrei Molotiu.
- September 19–December 17: "Drawing Us Together: Public Life and Public Health in Contemporary Comics" (Johnson-Kulukundis Family Gallery, Byerly Hall, Harvard Radcliffe Institute, Cambridge, Massachusetts) — curated by Meg Rotzel
- November 12–May 7, 2023: "Man Saves Comics! Bill Blackbeard's Treasure of 20th Century Newspapers" (Billy Ireland Cartoon Library & Museum, Columbus, Ohio) — selections from Bill Blackbeard's comprehensive collection of early comic strips

== Conventions ==
- March 26: Big Apple Comic Con (Wyndham New Yorker Hotel, New York City)
- April 2–3: MoCCA Festival (Metropolitan Pavilion, New York City)
- June 18–19: Brooklyn Comic Con (Brooklyn Expo Center, Brooklyn, New York)
- July 21–24: San Diego Comic-Con (San Diego Convention Center, San Diego, California)
- September 17–18: Small Press Expo [SPX] (Bethesda North Marriott Hotel & Conference Center, North Bethesda, Maryland)
- October 6–9:
  - Cartoon Crossroads Columbus — special guests include Keith Knight, Maia Kobabe, Ed Piskor, Trina Robbins, Tom Gauld, James Sturm, and Barbara Brandon-Croft
  - New York Comic Con (Javits Center, New York City)
- October 22–23: Massachusetts Independent Comics Expo [MICE] (Fuller Building, Boston University, Boston, Massachusetts) — first time at new location; special guests include Maia Kobabe, Steenz, Jarrett J. Krosoczka, Dave Ortega, and Joel Christian Gill
- October 28–30: Baltimore Comic-Con (Baltimore Convention Center, Baltimore, Maryland)
