= 1920s in comics =

- 1910s
- 1920s in comics
- 1930s
Other topics in 1920s:
- Anthropology
- Fashion
- Music
- Science and technology
- Sociology
- Television

This is a timeline of significant events in comics in the 1920s.

== 1920 ==
- January 4: The first issue of the Flemish Catholic children's magazine Zonneland and its Walloon sister publication Petits Belges are published. Both will feature a lot of children's comics. Petits Belges changes its name into Bonjour in 1957 and Tremplin in 1960.
- January 14: In E.C. Segar's Thimble Theatre, Castor Oyl makes his debut.
- January 17: The first issue of the British comics magazine Film Fun is published. It will run until 15 September 1962.
- April 4: Charles A. Voight's Betty makes its debut. It will run until 1943.
- April 7: The picture story Liška Bystrouška ("Vixen Sharp-Ears"), scripted by Rudolf Těsnohlídek and drawn by Stanislav Lolek, starts serialisation in the Czech newspaper Lidové Noviny, where it will run until 23 June.
- August:
  - In Portugal Rocha Vieira creates Fitas de Juca e Zeca.
  - Stan Cross' The Potts makes its debut, but as You & Me (it receives its more familiar title, The Potts only in 1951). He will draw it personally until 1939, after which Jim Russell will take it over until his death in 2001, which also means the comic strip's conclusion.
- August 15: Harrison Cady's Peter Rabbit makes its debut. He will continue the series until 1948, after which Vincent Fago takes it over.
- September 20: Martin Branner's Winnie Winkle makes its debut. It will run until 1996.
- October 17: Oscar Jacobsson's Adamson (known in English as Silent Sam) makes its debut. It will un until 1964.
- November 8: Mary Tourtel's Rupert Bear makes its debut. Her husband Herbert Tourtel writes the texts, while she illustrates.
- December 24: The first daily episode of the King Features series The Five-Fifteen (later, Sappo the commuter) by Elzie Crisler Segar is printed.
- Frans Masereel publishes the pantomime comics and graphic novels Idée, sa naissance, sa vie, sa mort (The Idea, its birth, its life, its death) and Histoire sans paroles: 60 images dessinées et gravées sur bois (Story Without Words).
- Harry Folkard creates Billy Bimbo and Peter Porker which is published in The London Evening News. The comic strip will become an even bigger sensation in The Netherlands, where it is published as Jopie Slim and Dikkie Bigmans from 1921 on.

== 1921 ==
- January 3: Russ Westover's Tillie the Toiler makes its debut. It will run until 15 March 1959.
- February 14: In Frank King's Gasoline Alley Walt Wallet discovers a baby at his doorstep, who will later be named Skeezix and adopted as his own son.
- June: The first issue of the Spanish comics magazine Pulgarcito is published.
- May 20: John Millar Watt's Pop debuts as Reggie Breaks It Gently.
- July 18: Fernand Wicheler publishes Le Dernier Film, the first Belgian newspaper comic. It will run until 1926.
- September 16: Gene Ahern and Bill Freyse's Our Boarding House makes its debut. It will run until 22 December 1984.
- November 13: In Jimmy Bancks' Us Fellers the character Ginger Meggs makes his debut. The series will eventually be named after him and become the longest-running Australian comics series of all time.
- The final episode of Richard F. Outcault's Buster Brown is published.
- The first episode of Ed Wheelan's Minute Movies is published. It will run until 1936.
- Monte Crews' The Mysterious Family Next Door first appears in print. It will run for about a year.

== 1922 ==
- February 13: The first episode of Al Posen's Them Days Is Gone Forever appears in print.
- March 20: J. R. Williams' Out Our Way makes its debut. It will run until 1977.
- May 2: A.M. de Jong and George van Raemdonck's Bulletje en Boonestaak makes its debut. It will run until 17 November 1937.
- July 17: In Billy DeBeck's Barney Google Spark Plug the horse makes its debut, leading to an eventual title change as Barney Google and Sparky Plug.
- July 22: J. P. Arnot's Helpful Henry makes its debut. It will run until 1927.
- July 23: Harry Julius' The Crazy Crew of the Crayfish debuts. It will run until 22 February 1923.
- September 22: The first issue of the British comics magazine The Wizard is published. It will run until 16 November 1963, after which it merges with The Rover.
- October 9: Larry Whittington's Fritzi Ritz makes its debut. In 1925 Ernie Bushmiller will take over the series.
- October 15: Comic artist Monte Crews gets injured in a car accident. Although he survives and recovers, it means the end of his newspaper comic The Mysterious Family Next Door.
- October 30: The first episode of George Herriman's Stumble Inn appears in print. The series will run until 1925.
- November 6: Joe Cunningham's Rufus McGoofus makes its debut. It will run in papers until about 1928.
- November 29: Walter Berndt's Smitty makes its debut. It will run until 1973.
- George Studdy's Bonzo the dog makes its debut.
- Storm P.'s Peter og Ping makes its debut.
- The final episode of Gus Mager's Hawkshaw the Detective is published.
- The final episode of Tad Dorgan's Judge Rummy is published.
- Unk White creates the comic strip Freckles.
- Rocha Vieira creates As Proezas de Necas e Tonecas.
- In the magazine El hogar, Don Pancho Talero by Arturo Lanteri, the first Argentine comics, makes its debut.

== 1923 ==
- February 22: The final episode of Harry Julius' The Crazy Crew of the Crayfish is published.
- March 15: Percy Crosby's Skippy makes its debut.
- May 22: Sol Hess and Wallace Carlson's The Nebbs makes its debut.
- June 19: Frank Willard and Ferd Johnson's Moon Mullins makes its debut. It will run until 2 June 1991.
- August 1: Otto Messmer adapts the animated cartoon character Felix the Cat into a comic strip.
- September 16: Syd Nicholls's Fatty Finn makes its debut. It will run until July 1977.
- December 8: The first issue of Jungle Jinks magazine is published. It will last a mere two years.
- The Scottish comics magazine The Vanguard makes its debut. It would run until 1926.
- Dutch cartoonist Ton van Tast creates his comic strip De Daverende Dingen Dezer Dagen for the Dutch satirical magazine Paljas. It will run from 1923 until 1948.
- The first episode of Lee W. Stanley's The Old Home Town is published, which will run until 1944.
- Bjarne Restan's Per og Peik i Sukkerlandet makes its debut.
- Oda Nobutsune and Katsuishi Kabashima create The Adventures of Sho-Chan.
- The first episode of Der Contibuben, a comic series written by famous German novelist Erich Maria Remarque and drawn by Hermann Schütz is published. The series will run until 1926.

== 1924 ==
- January 26: Ethel Hays' Flapper Fanny Says makes its debut. It will run until June 29, 1940.
- February 18: Edgar Martin's comic strip Girl is renamed after the most popular character Boots into Boots and Her Buddies.
- February 19: The first episode of Loron Taylor's Mom 'n' Pop is published.
- April 14: Roy Crane's Wash Tubbs makes its debut. It will run until 10 January 1988.
- May 16: The first issue of the Russian illustrated children's magazine Murzilka is published.
- June 25: Chic Young's Dumb Dora makes its debut. It will run until January 1936.
- July 17: The Society of Australian Black and White Artists (nowadays the Australian Cartoonists' Association) is established.
- August 5: Harold Gray's Little Orphan Annie makes its debut.
- September 27: In Harold Gray's Little Orphan Annie Daddy Warbucks makes his debut.
- October 1: The first issue of the Italian comics magazine Il Giornalino is published.
- October 5: Louis Forton's Bibi Fricotin makes its debut.
- December 19: In Turkey Ramiz Gökçe's Bobi'nin Marifetleri appears in the humor magazine Akbaba.
- H. T. Webster's Timid Soul makes its debut, which also marks the debut of Caspar Milquetoast. The series will run until 1953.
- Gelett Burgess adapts his Goops characters into a comic strip, but it will only run for about a year.
- Benjamin Rabier's Gédéon makes its debut.
- Jan Lunde's Professor Skjeel makes its debut.
- Bjarne Restan's Paal og Pelles Reise makes its debut.
- In Russia the artist's collective Kukryniksy is founded, who will make many propaganda posters, some with sequential illustrated narratives, much like comics.
- In Italy, the house Imperia, near to the Fascist Party, publishes the first Italian comic album, Le burle di Furbicchio ai maghi (Furbicchio mocks the wizards), by the futurist painter Filiberto Scarpelli, (father of the screenwriter Furio Scarpelli).

== 1925 ==
- January 9: The final episode of Stumble Inn by George Herriman is published.
- February 14: The first episode of S. K. Perkins' Spadger's XI is published, which will continue until 1931, when Chick Gordon takes over the series.
- February 21: The first issue of the American humor and cartoons magazine The New Yorker is published. On its cover their mascot, Eustace Tilley, designed by Rea Irvin, makes his debut.
- February 22: Ruth Vickery's Betty and Bill is first published. It will run until 3 May, after which the series restarts on 28 June and runs until 2 May 1926.
- April 4: The final episode of Al Posen's Them Days Is Gone Forever is published.
- May 3: Alain Saint-Ogan's Zig et Puce makes its debut in Dimanche Illustré, weekly supplement of the French newspaper l’Excelsior.
- June 1: Bill Conselman and Charles Plumb's Ella Cinders makes its debut and will run until 1961, distributed by the United Feature Syndicate.
- August 9: Wynne W. Davies published the first episode of Percy the Pommy.
- August 30: Ferd Johnson's Texas Slim makes its debut through the Chicago Tribune Syndicate.
- November 22: Salvador Bartolozzi launches the first issue of the Spanish children's magazine Pinocho, in which his comics character Pinocho makes its debut. The magazine will run until 1931.
- December 7: Paul Robinson's Etta Kett makes its debut.
- December 14: The final issue of Jungle Jinks magazine is published. It is retitled: Playbox.
- December 25: In Alain Saint-Ogan's Zig et Puce, Alfred the penguin makes his first appearance.
- The final episode of Winsor McCay's Dream of the Rarebit Fiend is published.
- Frans Masereel publishes the pantomime comics graphic novel La Ville: cent bois gravés (The City).
- Faith Burrows's Flapper Filosofy makes its debut.
- Ola Fogelberg's Pekka Puupää makes its debut. It wil run until 1975.
- Sergej Mironović Golovčenko creates Maks i Maksic.
- George Hager and his sister Mary Hager Dearborn take over their father's, Dok Hager, Dok's Dippy Duck and retitle and continue it as The Adventures of Waddles.

== 1926 ==
=== March ===
- March 1: The first episode of Roland J. Scott's newspaper comic series Sally Sallies is published.
- March 21: The final episode of Wynne W. Davies' Percy the Pommy appears in print.

=== April ===
- April: The first issue of the Italian children's and comics magazine Giornale dei Ragazzi is published. It will run until November 1943. . Featuring a dutiful observance of the moral dictates of Fascism, the magazine consisted mostly of columns on various topics, and introduced the comics (of strict Italian production, in compliance with the directives of the MinCulPop) only from the 8th number in last year of publication.
- April 19: Al Posen's series Jinglet debuts. It will run, with an interruption between 1950 and 1953, until 1960.

=== May ===
- May 1: The final episode of Fernand Wicheler's newspaper comic Le Dernier Film appears in print.
- May 2: The final episode of Ruth Vickery's Betty and Bill is published.
- May 9: Norman McMurray's Fish and Chips debuts. It will run until 26 June 1927.
- May 16: The first episode of Billy DeBeck's Parlor, Bedroom and Sink is published, which would change its name to Bunky later on.

=== June ===
- June 24: In Frank King's Gasoline Alley Walt Wallet marries Phyllis Blossom.

=== July ===
- July: Hergé publishes his first actual comic strip, The Adventures of Totor in the Belgian scouting magazine Le Boy Scout Belge. It will run until July 1929.

=== August ===
- August: Harry Julius launches his comic strip Mr. Gunk - He Didn't Think!.

=== December ===
- December: The final episode of Der Contibuben, a comic series written by famous German writer Erich Maria Remarque and drawn by Hermann Schütz, is published.
- December 26: The final episode of Winsor McCay's Little Nemo in Slumberland is published.

=== Specific date unknown ===
- Otto Nückel publishes his pantomime comic/wordless novel Schicksal (Destiny).
- William St. John Glenn creates Oscar in The Belfast Telegraph.
- The final issue of the Flemish comics magazine De Geïllustreerde Kinderwereld is published.
- Rolf Kluge takes over Skomakker Bekk of Tvillingene Hans from Jan Lunde.
- Larry Redner launches The Tinymites.
- Jack Lait and Louis Biedermann publish the children's book All The Funny Folks, in which comics characters from different series have a cross-over.
- John Hix launches Strange as It Seems, which will run until 1970.

== 1927 ==
- January 10: Ed Verdier's Little Annie Rooney makes its debut. He will draw it for the first two years.
- January 13: The final episode of A.D. Condo's The Outbursts of Everett True is published.
- January 20: Sidney Smith and Stanley Link's Ching Chow makes its debut. It will run until 4 June 1990.
- March 24: George Storm's Bobby Thatcher makes its debut. The series will run for a decade.
- March 25: The first issue of the Dutch-Flemish comics magazine De Humorist is published.
- June 27: The first episode of Mel Cummin's Good Time Guy is published. It will continue until 1930.
- July 2: Norman McMurray's Googles debuts. It will run until 1 June 1930.
- July 17: Elov Persson's Kronblom makes its debut.
- October: Monte Barrett and Frank Ellis' Jane Arden makes its debut.
- October: Russell Johnson's long-running comic strip Mr. Oswald premiers, which he will draw until 1989, for 62 years straight.
- November 13:
  - Frank Godwin's Connie makes its debut.
  - In Billy DeBeck's Parlor, Bedroom and Sink the baby Bunky makes his debut, after whom the series shall be retitled.
- Rolf Kluge's Skibsreder Jobbenheim og Sølvmine makes its debut.
- Otto Luihn and Bjarne Restan's satirical comics series Sjur Sjursen vil bli Kapitalist makes its debut.
- Sidney Strube's The Little Man makes its debut.

== 1928 ==
- February 11: Dudley D. Watkins' Morgyn the Mighty makes its debut in the 304th issue of The Rover.
- April 21: The first issue of the Chinese comics magazine Shanghai Manhua is published and will run until 7 June 1930.
- May 2: In Frank King's Gasoline Alley Walt and Phyllis Blossom have a natural-born son, Corky. Many readers sent in angry letters because it implies that the couple must have had sexual intercourse. Walt's first child, Skeezix, was found at his doorstep and thus avoided controversy.
- May 21: Sal Bostwick's Room and Board is first published.
- May 21: Glenn Chaffin and Hal Forrest's Tailspin Tommy makes its debut.
- June 4: Les Forgrave's Big Sister debuts. It will run until 1972.
- August 13: Lyman Young's Tim Tyler's Luck makes its debut.
- October 19: Dante Quinterno's Patoruzú makes its debut.
- November 1: The first issue of the Belgian comics magazine Le Petit Vingtième is published, with Hergé as both its chief editor and main illustrator and comics artist. In its first issue the comic Flup, Nénesse, Poussette et Cochonnet is published, which will run until 7 March 1929.
- December 10: Harold C. Earnshaw creates the newspaper comic strip The Pater. It will run until 28 February 1931.
- Bruno Angoletta's Marmittone makes its debut.
- Elov Persson's Agust och Lotta makes its debut.
- Kitazawa Rakuten creates Tonda Haneko Jō (とんだはね子嬢,, "Miss Haneko Tonda"), the first manga starring a female protagonist.
- In Italy, Le avventure aviatorie di un balillino (The airplane adventures of a little Balilla), published by Giuseppe Nerbini, written by his son Mario and drawn by Carlo Cossio, second Italian comic album.

== 1929 ==
=== January ===
- January 7: Dick Calkins' comic strip Buck Rogers, based on the novels of Philip Francis Nowlan, makes its debut.
- January 7: Hal Foster's comic strip Tarzan of the Apes, loosely based on Edgar Rice Burroughs's novels, makes its debut. make their debut on the same day.
- January 10: Hergé's The Adventures of Tintin debuts in the children's supplement Le Petit Vingtième of the newspaper Le Vingtième Siècle, with the story Tintin in the Land of the Soviets. This also marks the debut of Tintin and his dog Snowy.
- January 11: Tony Velasquez' Kenkoy makes its debut.
- January 16: Dell Comics publishes the American comics magazine The Funnies #1, which is the first American newsstand comic book of all-original material. It lacked covers, and was in that way more like a newspaper insert, but was sold independently.
- January 17: In E.C. Segar's Thimble Theatre Popeye the Sailor makes his debut. He will quickly become the new protagonist of the series.

=== February ===
- February 5: Jimmy Hatlo's They'll Do It Every Time makes its debut. The series will continue until 2 February 2008.
- February 17: Milt Gross' Count Screwloose makes its debut.

=== April ===
- April: Carlo Bisi's Sor Pampurio makes its debut in Corriere dei Piccoli.
- April: Don Wootton's Seeing Stars, a daily comic with biographical trivia about Hollywood stars, debuts.

=== May ===
- May 10: Irving Knickerbocker publishes the first episode of Mac, which will be continued by different artists until 1943.

=== July ===
- July: Hergé discontinues The Adventures of Totor after four years.
- August: In the Buck Rogers comic strip his love interest Wilma Deering makes her debut.

=== August ===
- August 17: Cemal Nadir Güler creates the comic strip Amcabey.

=== October ===
- October 26: In E.C. Segar's Thimble Theatre the Sea Hag makes her debut. Her name will only be revealed 17 days later but she will quickly emerge as Popeye's major antagonist.
- October: J.P. McEvoy and John H. Striebel co-create a comic strip based on McEvoy's popular novel series: Dixie Dugan.
- October: Gods' Man by Lynd Ward appears—the first American wordless novel

=== December ===
- December 29: Dorothy Urfer's Annibelle makes her debut.

=== Specific date unknown ===
- Jan Lunde's Dimpen og Dumpen makes its debut.
- Westphal's Star Dust, a daily comic about Hollywood stars, makes its debut.
- In Styria, Austria, a school official bans Wilhelm Busch's classic comic book Max und Moritz for people under 18 years old.

== Births ==
=== January ===
- January 17: Georges Pichard, French comics artist and writer (Ténébrax, Submerman, Blanche Epiphanie, Paulette) (d. 2003).

=== February ===
- February 11: George Mandel, American writer and comics artist (The Woman in Red, comics for Better Publications), (d. 2021).
- February 17: Curt Swan, American comic book artist (Superman, Legion of Super-Heroes), (d. 1996).

=== March ===
- March 3: Ronald Searle, British cartoonist and comic artist (St. Trinians), (d. 2011).

=== June ===
- June 12: Dave Berg, American comic writer and artist (The Lighter Side of...), (d. 2002).

=== October ===
- October 17: John Prentice, American comics artist best known for his work on Young Romance and for succeeding Alex Raymond as artist on Rip Kirby. (d. 1999).

=== January ===
- January 14: John Tartaglione, American comics artist and inker (Marvel Comics, made comics biographies about John F. Kennedy, Lyndon B. Johnson, Pope John Paul II and Mother Teresa), (d. 2003).
- January 17: Antonio Prohías, Cuban-American cartoonist and comics artist (Mad Magazine, creator of Spy vs. Spy), (d. 1998).

=== August ===
- August 2: George Wilson, American comics artist, painted covers for Dell Comics and Gold Key Comics, (d. 1998).

=== December ===
- December 15: Al Plastino, American comic book artist (Superman, co-creator of Supergirl, Brainiac, and the Legion of Super-Heroes), (d. 2013).

=== August ===
- August 25: Marie Marcks, German caricaturist, cartoonist and comics artist, (d. 2014).

=== November ===
- November 26: Charles M. Schulz, American cartoonist and comics artist (creator of Peanuts), (d. 2000).

=== December ===
- December 28: Stan Lee, American comic book writer (Marvel Comics), (d. 2018).
- December 30: Marc Sleen, Belgian comics writer and artist (The Adventures of Nero, Piet Fluwijn en Bolleke, De Lustige Kapoentjes, Doris Dobbel, Oktaaf Keunink, De Ronde van Frankrijk), (d. 2016).

=== June ===
- June 7: Henryk Chmielewski, aka Papcio Chmiel, Polish comics artist, illustrator and journalist (Tytus, Romek i A'Tomek), (d. 2021).

=== July ===
- July 18: Guy Bara, French cartoonist and comic artist (Max L'Explorateur, Kéké Le Perroquet, Cro-Magnon), (d. 2003).

=== August ===
- August 10: Jean Graton, French comics writer and artist (Michel Vaillant, Julie Wood) and publisher (Éditions Graton), (d. 2021).

=== September ===
- September 3: Mort Walker, American comics writer (Hi & Lois, Hagar the Horrible, Boner's Ark, Sam's Strip) and artist (Beetle Bailey), (d. 2018).
- September 12: Bert Wunderink, Dutch comics artist (Bram en Sijm en de Bende van Zwarte Dolf), (d. 2003).

=== October ===
- October 31: Carlos Freixas, Spanish comics artist (Pistol Jim, Darío Malbrán Psicoanalista, Elmer King, Tucho, de Canilla a Campeón), (d. 2003).

=== Specific date unknown ===
- Eddie Sato, American comics artist (Dokie), (d. 2005).

=== January ===
- January 3: André Franquin, Belgian comic artist (Gaston Lagaffe (Gomer Goof), Marsupilami, Modeste et Pompon, Franquin's Last Laugh, continued Spirou et Fantasio) (d. 1997).

=== March ===
- March 1: Arnold Drake, American comics writer (It Rhymes with Lust, co-creator of the Doom Patrol and Deadman), (d. 2007).
- March 30: Raymond Macherot, Belgian comic artist (Chlorophylle, Sibylline), (d. 2008).

=== April ===
- April 4: Joye Hummel, American comics writer (Wonder Woman), (d. 2021).

=== October ===
- October 3: Harvey Kurtzman, American comic writer (Mad Magazine Goodman Beaver, Little Annie Fanny) and chief editor (Mad Magazine), (d. 1993).
- October 5: Bob Thaves, American comics artist (Frank and Ernest), (d. 2006).

=== December ===
- December 2: Jack Davis, American comics artist (Mad Magazine), (d. 2016).
- December 5: José Geraldo Barreto, Brazilian comics artist (Rafles, Zé Candango), (d. 2014).

=== February ===
- February 10: Vahan Shirvanian, American cartoonist and comics artist (No Comment), (d. 2013).

=== May ===
- May 16: Hannes Hegen, German comics artist (Digedags), (d. 2014).
- May 24: Carmine Infantino, American comics artist and editor (Detective Comics, Flash, Showcase), (d. 2013).

=== November ===
- November 25: Narayan Debnath, Indian comic artist (Handa Bhonda, Bantul the Great, Nonte Phonte), (d. 2022).

=== April ===
- April 6: Gil Kane, Latvian-American comic book artist (Detective Comics, Green Lantern, Mystery in Space, Spider-Man), (d. 2000).

=== July ===
- July 2: Mel Keefer, American cartoonist (Mac Divot), (d. 2022).

=== October ===
- October 10:
  - André Beckers, Belgian comic artist (La Patrouille des Aigles, Lieutenant Tompson, assisted on Buck Danny), (d. 2021).
  - Orlando Busino, American cartoonist and comic artist (Gus, worked for Archie Comics), (d. 2022).

=== Specific date unknown ===
- Peter Woolcock, British comics artist and political cartoonist (Freddie Frog, Mr. Toad, continued Tiger Tim), (d. 2014).

=== January ===
- January 13: Guy Mouminoux, AKA Dimitri, Dimitri Lahache, Guy Sajer, French writer, comic writer (wrote scripts for Jean Valhardi) and artist (Goutatou et Dorochaux, Le Chevalier au Blason d'Argent, Les Familleurreux, Prémolaire, Krampon, Les Aventures de Rififi, Le Goulag, continued Blason d'Argent), (d. 2022).

=== April ===
- April 10: Brumsic Brandon Jr., American comics artist (Luther), (d. 2014).

=== November ===
- November 2: Steve Ditko, American comic book artist and writer (Marvel Comics, DC Comics), (d. 2018).

=== Specific date unknown ===
- Len Lawson, Australian comics artist (The Lone Avenger, The Hooded Rider, Diana, Queen of the Apes) and convicted rapist and murderer, (d. 2003).

=== February ===
- February 3: Mino Milani, Italian cartoonist, (d. 2022).

=== September ===
- September 25: Julio Radilović, Croatian comic artist (Herlock Sholmes, Partizani), (d. 2022).

=== Specific date unknown ===
- Manuel Zatarain, aka Zata, Spanish comics artist (El Capitan Martin de la Patrulla de los Diamantes, Goyo y Nico, Quique Banderas), (d. 2013).

=== May ===
- May 30: Frank Jacobs, American comics writer (Mad Magazine), (d. 2021).

=== December ===
- December 14: Pete Millar, American comics artist (Drag Cartoons, co-creator of CARtoons Magazine), (d. 2003).

== Deaths ==
=== 1920 ===
- February 14: Hans Schliessman, German illustrator and comics artist, dies at age 58.
- February 20: Jacqueline Rivière, French comics writer (Bécassine), dies at age 68.
- September 8: Manuel Gustavo Bordalo Pinheiro, Portuguese illustrator and comic artist, dies at age 53.
- November 5: Henri de Sta, French illustrator and cartoonist (Toby le Giraffe), dies at age 74.
- December 11: F. H. Townsend, British illustrator, cartoonist and comics artist, dies at age 52.
- Specific date unknown: Fernando Xumetra Ragull, aka F. Xumetra, Spanish illustrator, painter, decorator and comics artist (made early picture stories, aka comics), dies at age 60.

=== 1921 ===
- May 13: Arpad Schmidhammer, German caricaturist, book illustrator and comics artist (Totentanz der Politik), dies at age 64.
- Specific date unknown: August von Meissl, Austrian illustrator and comics artist, dies at age 43 or 44.

=== 1922 ===
- February 13: Jehan Testevuide, French painter, comic artist and photographer (Trop Bien Déguisés), dies at age 48.

=== 1923 ===
- March 27: Kate J. Fricero, French illustrator and comics artist (Les Distractions de Mlle Nini), dies at age 45.
- May 29: Adolf Oberländer, German caricaturist, cartoonist, comics artist and illustrator, dies at age 77.
- June: Syd B. Griffin, American comics artist (Mister Bings and the Twentieth Century, continued Little Umjiji), dies at age 58.
- November 24: Myer Marcus, aka Billy Liverpool, American comics artist (Percy Vere, Doubting Thomas, Big Scalper), dies at age 55.
- December 13: Théophile Alexandre Steinlen, Swiss-French illustrator, painter, poster and comics artist (made various text comics and pantomime comics for several magazines), died at age 64.

=== 1924 ===
- January 19: Édouard François Zier, French illustrator, painter and comics artist (ghosted a few episodes of Bécassine), dies at age 67 or 68.
- April 3: Franz von Bayros, Croatian-Austrian illustrator, dies at age 57.
- July 8: Walter R. Allman, American comics artist (The Doings of The Duffs), dies at age 40.
- July 11: Jules Depaquit, French caricaturist, cartoonist, poet, playwright, illustrator and comics artist, dies at age 54.
- July 24: Palmer Cox, Canadian illustrator and comics artist (The Brownies), dies at age 84.
- Specific date unknown: James Brian Fitzmaurice, Canadian comics artist, dies at age 48 or 49.

=== 1925 ===
- March 19: Firmin Bouisset, French illustrator, lithographer, poster designer and comics artist, dies at age 65.
- June 4: Walter Russel Bradford, A.K.A. W.R. Bradford, American comics artist (Fitzboomski the Anarchist, Jingling Johnson), dies at age 53.
- July 7: Lothar Meggendorfer, German illustrator and comics artist, dies at age 77.
- September 13: Margaret G. Hays, American children's book writer, comics writer (wrote comics for her sister Grace Drayton) and artist (Jennie and Jack, Also The Little Dog Jap), dies at age 51.
- October 5: Fritz Gareis jr., Austrian caricaturist and comics artist (Bilderbogen des kleinen Lebens), dies at age 62.
- October 6: Tim Early, American comic artist (The Geevum Girls, Samson and Delila), dies at age 36 from heart disease.
- November 17: J. Campbell Cory, American political cartoonist, illustrator and comics artist (Funny Side of Life in Montana, Lariat Pete, Cory's Kids, ghosted The Katzenjammer Kids), dies at age 58.

=== 1926 ===
- 23 January: Teodoro Gascón Baquero, Spanish pharmacist and comics artist, dies at age 75.
- February 4: Adolphe Willette, French illustrator, painter, caricaturist and comics artist (made several one-shot text comics and pantomime comics), dies at age 68.
- May 24: Clarence Rigby, American comics artist (Toyland, The Wooden Babes, Bruno and Pietro, Little Ah Sid, Inquisitive Clarence, Adventures of a Pair of Jacks, Professor Blackart), dies at age 60.
- June 3: Diógenes Taborda, Argentine comics artist, dies at age 35 or 36.
- August 7: T. S. Sullivant, American illustrator and comics artist, dies at age 71.
- October 11: Albert Robida, French comics artist, illustrator, caricaturist, novelist and journalist (Le Vingtième Siècle, La Guerre au vingtième siècle and Le Vingtième siècle. La vie électrique), dies at age 78.
- November 16: Karel Klíč, Czech illustrator, painter, photo engraver, lithographer and comics artist (Die Friedensverhandlungen), dies at age 85.
- December 1: Draner, Belgian caricaturist, comics artist and costume designer (made text comics for Le Charivari), dies at age 93.
- Specific date unknown:
  - S.W. Cavenagh, British comic artist (Mr. Bodger), dies at age 70.
  - Teodoro Gascón Baquero, Spanish illustrator and comics artist, dies at age 75 or 76.

=== 1927 ===
- March 11: Edouard Pépin, French caricaturist, illustrator and comics artist, dies at age 85.
- August 21: Livingston Hopkins, American-Australian cartoonist and comics artist (Professor Tigwissel's Burglar Alarm), dies at age 81.
- December 3: Joseph A. Lemon (Willy Cute, Professor Bughouse), dies at age 57.

=== 1928 ===
- January 12: Rudolf Těsnohlídek, Czech poet, novelist and comic writer (Liška Bystrouška, A.K.A. Vixen Sharp-Ears), commits suicide at age 45.
- June 22: Arthur Burdett Frost, American illustrator, painter, graphic artist and comics writer and artist (Our Cat Eats Rat Poison, aka Fatal Mistake), dies at age 77.
- August 15: Joaquín Moya Ángeles, aka Moya, Spanish caricaturist, illustrator and comics artist, dies at an unknown age.
- September 25: Richard F. Outcault, American comics artist (The Yellow Kid, Buster Brown), dies at the age of 65.
- October 8: Larry Semon, American comedian and comics artist (Billiken, Larry, Mr. Wood B. Sport), dies at age 39 from TBC.
- October 10: Ed Carey, American comics artist (Brainy Bowers and Drowsy Duggan, Simon Simple, Professor Hypnotiser), dies at age 66 or 67 from a cerebral hemorrhage.

=== 1929 ===
- January 18: Charles Jay Taylor, American comics artist (Mr. Firstlove), dies at age 83.
- April 14: Albert Levering, American illustrator and comic artist (Artful Arty and Alex Smart, made sequential stories for Puck), dies at age 59 or 60.
- May 2: Tad Dorgan, American comics artist (Indoor Sports, Judge Rummy), dies at age 52.
- July 11: Willem van der Nat, Dutch illustrator, sculptor and comics artist, dies at age 54.
- August 9: Heinrich Zille, German illustrator, caricaturist, photographer, cartoonist and comics artist (Vadding), dies at age 71.
- October 17: W.L. Wells, American comics artist (Old Nicodemus Nimble, continued Old Opie Dilldock's Stories), dies at age 81.
- November 18: Victor Schramm, Romanian comics artist (Karl and Fritz), dies at age 64.
- December 8: Georges Delaw, French painter, illustrator and comics artist (Les Mille et un Tours de Placide Serprolet), dies at age 67.
