= How to Murder Your Wife =

1965 film by Richard Quine

- Theatrical release poster
- Directed by: Richard Quine
- Written by: George Axelrod
- Produced by: George Axelrod
- Starring: Jack Lemmon; Virna Lisi; Claire Trevor; Eddie Mayehoff; Terry-Thomas
- Cinematography: Harry Stradling
- Edited by: David Wages
- Music by: Neal Hefti
- Production companies: Murder, Inc. Jalem Productions; Charleston Enterprises
- Distributed by: United Artists
- Release date: January 26, 1965 (United States)
- Running time: 118 minutes
- Country: United States
- Languages: English; Italian
- Box office: $12 million

How to Murder Your Wife is a 1965 American black comedy film from United Artists, produced by George Axelrod, directed by Richard Quine, that stars Jack Lemmon and Virna Lisi. Quine also directed Lemmon in My Sister Eileen, It Happened to Jane, Operation Mad Ball, The Notorious Landlady and Bell, Book and Candle. The film was co-produced by Lemmon's company, Jalem Productions, and Axelrod's company Charleston Enterprises, through a one-shot holding company, Murder, Inc.

The comic strip art featured in the film was credited to Mel Keefer, who drew newspaper comic strips such as Perry Mason, Mac Divot and Rick O'Shay. Comics artist Alex Toth did a teaser comic strip in Keefer's style that ran in The Hollywood Reporter and in several newspapers promoting the film for ten days prior to its theatrical opening.

== Plot ==
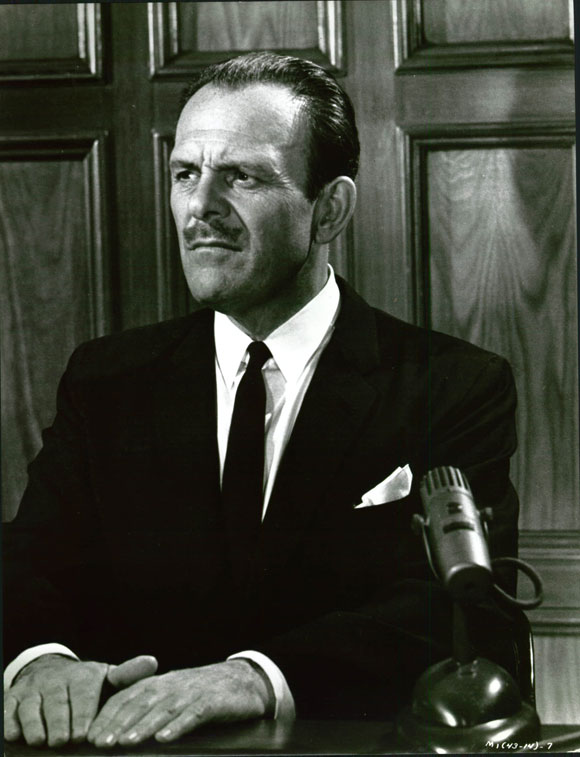
Charles (Terry-Thomas) testifying on the stand during the trial

Stanley Ford is a successful newspaper cartoonist who enjoys his bachelorhood in his luxury Manhattan townhouse, with his loyal and attentive English valet, Charles. Stanley is the creator of the widely syndicated comic strip Bash Brannigan, which follows the adventures of a daring secret agent. Stanley insists he would never have Brannigan do anything Stanley himself has not actually done. To ensure the authenticity of his comic strip, Stanley enacts Brannigan's adventures around the city while Charles takes photographs, which Stanley uses as visual references when drawing the strip.

After getting drunk at a friend's bachelor party, Stanley awakens the next morning to find himself married to the beautiful young Italian woman who emerged from a cake at the party, which he instantly regrets. Discovering that his new wife does not speak English, Stanley desperately tries to get the marriage annulled, but his lawyer, Harold Lampson, who has always wanted Stanley to settle down, informs him that a divorce is not possible without legal justification.

Stanley's new wife is cheerful, affectionate, and a skilled cook, despite only speaking Italian. To learn English, Mrs. Ford spends time with Harold's manipulative, henpecking wife Edna, who speaks fluent Italian. Refusing to work for married couples, Charles resigns. Stanley now finds his bathroom filled with beauty products and lingerie, and he is kept awake at night by his wife constantly watching television, which she says helps with her English. She keeps a yapping small dog, her Italian cooking causes him to gain weight, and she announces that her mother will be coming from Italy to visit.

Working at home, Stanley becomes increasingly irritated by the constant presence of his wife, and he changes his Bash Brannigan comic strip to a domestic household comedy, The Brannigans, but it remains wildly popular. In a bid for some privacy, Stanley calls a meeting of his associates at his all-male health club. When Edna learns of the meeting, she telephones Mrs. Ford and arouses her suspicions about Stanley's activities. Mrs. Ford sneaks into the club to confront her husband, resulting in Stanley being banned for violating its "no women" policy.

Stanley concocts a plot for his comic strip in which Brannigan murders his wife by drugging her and disposing of her body, so that Brannigan can resume his career as a secret agent. As usual, he enacts the events in real life before drawing the strip, drugging his wife during a cocktail party at the Fords' home. As she sleeps, Stanley crawls out the window and throws a mannequin dressed as Mrs. Ford into a concrete mixer on the construction site behind their townhouse.

The next morning, while Stanley is sleeping, Mrs. Ford sees the finished comic strip detailing Stanley's murder plan. Heartbroken, she leaves, taking only her dog. After publication of the comic strip in the newspapers, and with Mrs. Ford having disappeared without explanation, Stanley is arrested and charged with murder, with his comic strips used as prosecution evidence at the trial. Facing a possible conviction, Stanley conducts his own defense and pleads justifiable homicide, appealing to the all-male jury's frustrations regarding their own wives and marriages. He is acquitted unanimously, and the men in the courtroom applaud wildly and carry Stanley out on their shoulders.

Accompanied by a joyful Charles, Stanley goes home and sees traces that his wife has returned and is in their bedroom. Charles reminds him that killing her now would not have any legal consequences, since Stanley has been acquitted of her murder and trying him again would constitute double jeopardy. However, when he enters their bedroom and finds her naked under the covers, she silently invites him to join her, which he does. Charles enters what used to be his bedroom and finds Mrs. Ford's mother, who has arrived with her daughter and is unpacking. Like Charles, she has a prominent tooth gap, and there is instant chemistry between them. Breaking the fourth wall, Charles closes the door.

== Cast ==
- Jack Lemmon as Stanley Ford
- Virna Lisi as Mrs. Ford
- Eddie Mayehoff as Harold Lampson, Ford's lawyer
- Claire Trevor as Edna Lampson
- Terry-Thomas as Charles, who narrates
- Sidney Blackmer as Judge Blackstone
- Jack Albertson as Dr. Bentley
- Max Showalter as Tobey Rawlins
- Alan Hewitt as the district attorney
- Mary Wickes as Harold's secretary
- Barry Kelley as a club member
- William Bryant as a construction worker
- Charles Bateman as a club member
- Edward Faulkner as a club member
- Lauren Gilbert as the men's club manager
- Howard Wendell as the trial judge
- Khigh Dhiegh as the bald actor playing a thug
- K. C. Townsend as a party girl

== Production ==
It was written by George Axelrod, who had just made Paris When It Sizzles (1964) with director Richard Quine. Axelrod said Quine "talked me into letting him direct How to Murder Your Wife, which I should have directed myself. I was ready then but too frightened."

== Awards ==
- Jack Lemmon won the Golden Laurel for Male Comedy Performance at the Laurel Awards.
- Claire Trevor was nominated for Golden Laurel for Female Supporting Performance.
- Jack Lemmon was also nominated for BAFTA Film Award for Best Foreign Actor.

== Soundtrack ==
The music was composed by Neal Hefti.

== Reception ==
The film holds a 64% rating on Rotten Tomatoes based on 14 reviews, with an average rating of 6.2 out of ten. Variety stated: "Finesse and desire aren't enough to overcome the fact that Axelrod's script doesn't make the most of its potentially antic situations." Bosley Crowther of The New York Times wrote: "Never have I seen a movie, serious, comic or otherwise, that so frankly, deliberately and grossly belittled and ridiculed wives" and "this stuff is funny just so long as one can go with the sour joke—and that depends upon one's tolerance of trivia and also, perhaps, upon whether one is a fellow or a girl".

== Cultural references ==
- The film is referenced in Fawlty Towers in the episode "The Wedding Party". Basil Fawlty says: “Yes, awfully good, I saw it six times”. In the Italian version of the film, both Stanley's wife and mother-in-law are Greek.

== See also ==
- List of American films of 1965
