= Yoshito Yasuhara =

Japanese actor and voice actor (born 1949)

- Born: November 17, 1949 (age 76); Aioi, Hyōgo, Japan
- Occupations: Actor, voice actor
- Years active: 1969–present
- Spouse: Yuri Kimura

Yoshito Yasuhara (安原 義人, Yasuhara Yoshito; born November 17, 1949, in Aioi, Hyōgo Prefecture, Japan) is a Japanese actor and voice actor. He is a member of Theatre Echo, a theatre troupe and talent management firm known for its comedy sketches. Yasuhara is known for being the Japanese dubbing voice of Mickey Rourke, Kevin Bacon, Bill Murray, Gary Oldman, Bill Pullman, Richard Gere, Tim Robbins, Kurt Russell, Tim Roth and Bob Odenkirk. He was also the first dub-over artist of Mel Gibson and Robin Williams in their early days.

== Filmography ==
=== Television drama ===
- Taiyō ni Hoero! (eps 198, 275, 423, 676)

=== Television animation ===
1970s

- Space Battleship Yamato (1974) (Kenjirō Ōta)
- The Song of Tentomushi (1974) (Kaji Isshū)
- Blocker Gundan IV: Machine Blaster (1976) (Tenpei Asuka)
- Dokaben (1976) (Santarō Hohoemi, Sankichi Sakata)
- Gowappā 5 Godam (1976) (Gō Tsunami)
- Yakyūkyō no Uta (1977) (Sentō)
- Wakakusa no Charlotte (1977) (Sandy)
- Haikara-san ga Tōru (1978) (Shingo Onishima)
- Gordian Warrior (1979) (Daigo Ōtaki)
- Mirai Robo Daltanious (1979) (Danji Hiiragi)
- The Rose of Versailles (1979) (Louis the 16th)

1980s

- Mū no Hakugei (1980) (Narration)
- Muteking, The Dashing Warrior (1980) (Caster Robo, Omatsuri Robo)
- Space Emperor God Sigma (1980) (Julie Noguchi)
- The Wonderful Adventures of Nils (1980) (Morten)
- The Flying House (1982) (Doctor Tokio Taimu - "Professor Humphrey Bumble" in the U.S. version)
- Tokimeki Tonight (1982) (Mori Etō)
- Cat's Eye (1983) (Toshio Utsumi)
- Pāman (TV Asahi version) (1983) (Birdman)
- Galactic Hurricane Sasuraiger (1983) (Narration)
- Tokusō Kihei Dorvack (1983) (Maruseru)
- Fist of the North Star (1984) (Juza of the Clouds)
- High School! Kimengumi (1985) (Takuma Sessa)
- Pastel Yumi, the Magic Idol (1986) (Ichirō Hanazono)
- Ozu no Mahōtsukai (1986) (Scarecrow)

1990s

- O~i! Ryoma (1992) (Yoshida Shōin)
- Rurouni Kenshin (1996) (Shinomori Aoshi)
- Hakugei: Legend of the Moby Dick (1997) (White Hat)
- DT Eightron (1998) (Doctor Genesis)
- Wild Arms: Twilight Venom (1999) (Valeria)

2000s

- PaRappa the Rapper (2001) (Prince Fleaswallow)
- Petite Princess Yucie (2002) (Fairy King)
- Konjiki no Gash Bell! (2004) (Doronma)
- Monster (2004) (Otto Heckel)
- Ultraviolet: Code 044 (2008) (Police Inspector Burke)

2010s

- One Piece (2013) (Dr. Vegapunk)
- Saint Seiya Omega (2013) (Equuleus Celeris)
- Yu-Gi-Oh! Zexal (2013) (Kurage)
- Tokyo ESP (2014) (Inspector Nabeshima)
- Endride (2016) (Rodney)
- Golden Kamuy (2018) (Kadokura)
- Fairy Tail (2018) (August)
- Zoids Wild Zero (2019) (Walter.Borman)

2020s

- Great Pretender (2020) (James Coleman)
- Delicious Party Pretty Cure (2022) (Ginger)
- Witch Hat Atelier (2026) (Nolnoa)

=== ONA ===
- Lupin the 3rd vs. Cat's Eye (2023) (Toshio Utsumi)

=== OVA ===
- Area 88 (1985) (Satoru Kanzaki)
- California Crisis: Tsuigeki no Hibana (1986) (Noera)
- Legend of the Galactic Heroes (1988) (Boris Konev)
- Shinshū Sudamahen (1988) (Ichidō Kanketsu)
- Naniwa Kin'yūden: Minami no Teiō (1993) (Ginjirō Manta)
- Terashima-chō Kidan (1993) (Gramps)
- Harlock Saga (1999) (Alberich)
- Rick and Morty: The Great Yokai Battle of Akihabara (2021) (Yamada Q-saku)

=== Theatrical animation ===
- Space Battleship Yamato (1977) (Kenjirō Ōta)
- Farewell to Space Battleship Yamato (1978) (Kenjirō Ōta)
- Yamato: The New Voyage (1981) (Kenjirō Ōta)
- Techno Police 21C (1982) (Kyōsuke Mibu)
- Tsushimamaru: Sayonara Okinawa (1982) (Miyasato)
- Final Yamato (1983) (Kenjirō Ōta)
- Locke the Superman (1984) (Yamaki)
- Laputa: Castle in the Sky (1986) (Louie)
- Kindaichi Case Files 2: Satsuriku no Deep Blue (1999) (Makoto Wakabayashi)
- Hamtaro: Ham Ham Ham Maboroshi no Princess (2002) (Sabaku-nya)
- Pa-Pa-Pa The Movie Pāman (2003) (Birdman)
- One Piece: Baron Omatsuri and the Secret Island (2005) (Burīfu)
- Summer Days with Coo (2007) (Ossan)
- The Irregular at Magic High School: The Movie – The Girl Who Summons the Stars (2017) (Takao Kanemaru)
- The Deer King (2021)

=== Tokusatsu ===
- Kamen Rider X (1974) (Toad Goemon)
- Kamen Rider Stronger (1975) (Kikkaijin Mousengoke, Kikkaijin Denkiei)

=== Video games ===
- JoJo's Bizarre Adventure (1999) (Hol Horse)
- Mega Man ZX Advent (2007) (Master Albert)
- Granblue Fantasy (2017) (Sevastien)
- Dissidia Final Fantasy Opera Omnia (2017) (Shadow)
- Ys X: Nordics (2023) (Joel Asrad)

=== Dubbing roles ===
==== Live-action ====
- Mickey Rourke
  - Body Heat (Teddy Lewis)
  - Year of the Dragon (Capt. Stanley White)
  - 9 1/2 Weeks (John Grey)
  - Wild Orchid (James Wheeler)
  - Desperate Hours (Michael Bosworth)
  - Angel Heart (1991 TV Asahi edition) (Harry Angel)
  - Harley Davidson and the Marlboro Man (Harley Davidson)
  - Fall Time (Florence)
  - Bullet (Butch 'Bullet' Stein)
  - Love in Paris (John Gray)
  - Man on Fire (Jordan Kalfus)
  - Sin City (Marv)
  - The Wrestler (Robin Randzowski)
  - 13 (Patrick Jefferson)
  - The Expendables (Tool)
  - The Courier (Maxwell)
  - Dead in Tombstone (Lucifer)
  - Java Heat (Malik)
  - Sin City: A Dame to Kill For (Marv)
  - Girl (Sheriff)
- Gary Oldman
  - Romeo Is Bleeding (Jack Grimaldi)
  - Léon: The Professional (1996 TV Asahi edition) (Norman Stansfield)
  - The Scarlet Letter (Rev. Arthur Dimmesdale)
  - Friends (Richard Crosby)
  - Hannibal (Netflix edition) (Mason Verger)
  - Rain Fall (Holtzer)
  - The Book of Eli (Carnegie)
  - Dawn of the Planet of the Apes (Dreyfus)
  - RoboCop (Dr. Dennett Norton)
  - Man Down (Captain Peyton)
  - The Space Between Us (Nathaniel Shepherd)
  - The Hitman's Bodyguard (Vladislav Dukhovich)
  - Darkest Hour (Winston Churchill)
  - Tau (Tau)
  - Hunter Killer (Admiral Charles Donnegan)
  - Oppenheimer (Harry S. Truman)
- Bill Murray
  - Ghostbusters (Dr. Peter Venkman)
  - Little Shop of Horrors (Arthur Denton)
  - Ghostbusters II (Dr. Peter Venkman)
  - What About Bob? (Bob Wiley)
  - Groundhog Day (Phil Connors)
  - The Life Aquatic with Steve Zissou (Steve Zissou)
  - Get Smart (2011 TV Asahi edition) (Agent 13)
  - Zombieland (Bill Murray)
  - Moonrise Kingdom (Walt Bishop)
  - Rock the Kasbah (Richie Lanz)
  - Ghostbusters (Martin Heiss)
  - Zombieland: Double Tap (Bill Murray)
  - Ghostbusters: Afterlife (Peter Venkman)
  - Ghostbusters: Frozen Empire (Peter Venkman)
- Kevin Bacon
  - Tremors (Val McKee)
  - The River Wild (Wade)
  - Apollo 13 (Jack Swigert)
  - Hollow Man (2003 TV Asahi edition) (Doctor Sebastian Caine)
  - Frost/Nixon (Jack Brennan)
  - X-Men: First Class (Sebastian Shaw)
  - R.I.P.D. (Bobby Hayes)
  - Black Mass (Charles McGuire)
  - The Darkness (Peter Taylor)
  - City on a Hill (John "Jackie" Rohr)
  - The Guardians of the Galaxy Holiday Special (Kevin Bacon)
  - Leave the World Behind (Danny)
  - MaXXXine (John Labat)
- Mel Gibson
  - Mad Max (1982 NTV edition) (Max Rockatansky)
  - Mad Max 2 (2015 Supercharger edition) (Max Rockatansky)
  - Mad Max Beyond Thunderdome (2015 Supercharger edition) (Max Rockatansky)
  - Bird on a Wire (1993 TV Asahi edition) (Rick Jarmin)
  - Lethal Weapon 3 (Martin Riggs)
  - Maverick (Bret Maverick)
  - Conspiracy Theory (Jerry Fletcher)
  - Lethal Weapon 4 (Martin Riggs)
  - What Women Want (Nick Marshall)
- Bill Pullman
  - Sibling Rivalry (Nicholas Meany)
  - Sleepless in Seattle (Walter)
  - Casper (1998 NTV edition) (Dr. James Harvey)
  - Independence Day (President Thomas J. Whitmore)
  - Igby Goes Down (Jason Slocumb Sr.)
  - The Equalizer (Brian Plummer)
  - Independence Day: Resurgence (Former President Thomas J. Whitmore)
  - LBJ (Ralph Yarborough)
  - The Equalizer 2 (Brian Plummer)
- Richard Gere
  - Mr. Jones (Mr. Jones)
  - First Knight (Lancelot)
  - Primal Fear (Martin Vail)
  - Nights in Rodanthe (Dr. Paul Flanner)
  - Amelia (George P. Putnam)
  - The Double (Paul Shepherdson)
  - Norman (Norman Oppenheimer)
- Daniel Stern
  - Leviathan (1991 TV Asahi edition) (Buzz 'Sixpack' Parrish)
  - Home Alone (Marv Merchants)
  - Home Alone 2: Lost in New York (Marv Merchants)
  - Rookie of the Year (Phil Brickma)
  - Bushwhacked (Max Grabelski)
  - Celtic Pride (Mike O'Hara)
- Robin Williams
  - Good Morning, Vietnam (Adrian Cronauer)
  - Toys (Leslie Zevo)
  - The Birdcage (Armand Goldman)
  - August Rush (Maxwell "Wizard" Wallace)
  - Old Dogs (Daniel "Dan" Rayburn)
  - The Angriest Man in Brooklyn (Henry Altmann)
- Woody Harrelson
  - Money Train (Charlie Robinson)
  - The People vs. Larry Flynt (Larry Flynt)
  - Palmetto (Harry Barber)
  - After the Sunset (Stan Lloyd)
  - 2012 (Charlie Frost)
  - The Electric State (Mr. Peanut)
- Bob Odenkirk
  - Breaking Bad (Saul Goodman)
  - Better Call Saul (Jimmy McGill/Saul Goodman)
  - The Post (Ben Bagdikian)
  - Little Women (Father March)
  - Nobody (Hutch "Nobody" Mansell)
  - Nobody 2 (Hutch "Nobody" Mansell)
- Tom Berenger
  - Sniper 2 (Thomas Beckett)
  - Sniper 3 (Thomas Beckett)
  - Sniper: Legacy (Thomas Beckett)
  - Sniper: Ultimate Kill (Thomas Beckett)
  - Sniper: Assassin's End (Thomas Beckett)
  - Sniper: No Nation (Thomas Beckett)
- Tim Robbins
  - Bull Durham (Ebby Calvin "Nuke" LaLoosh)
  - Jacob's Ladder (1993 NTV edition) (Jacob Singer)
  - The Shawshank Redemption (1997 TBS edition) (Andy Dufresne)
  - The Brink (Secretary of State Walter Larson)
  - Castle Rock (Reginald "Pops" Merrill)
- The 100 (Marcus Kane (Henry Ian Cusick))
- Action Point (Deshawn Chico "D.C." Carver (Johnny Knoxville))
- Agatha Christie's Poirot (Captain Arthur Hastings (second voice) (Hugh Fraser))
- The Age of Shadows (Lee Jung-chool (Song Kang-ho))
- Almost Human (Rudy Lom (Mackenzie Crook))
- Another Stakeout (Det. Chris Lecce (Richard Dreyfuss))
- The Art of Racing in the Rain (Don Kitch (Gary Cole))
- The Assassination of Jesse James by the Coward Robert Ford (Frank James (Sam Shepard))
- The A-Team (Lieutenant Templeton "Faceman" Peck (Dirk Benedict))
- The A-Team (film) (Pensacola Prisoner Milt (Dirk Benedict))
- The Attorney (Song Woo-suk (Song Kang-ho))
- Beetlejuice (Adam Maitland (Alec Baldwin))
- Beverly Hills Cop II (1990 Fuji TV edition) (Billy Rosewood (Judge Reinhold))
- Big Trouble in Little China (Jack Burton (Kurt Russell))
- Billy Lynn's Long Halftime Walk (Norm Oglesby (Steve Martin))
- The Bodyguard (Old Man #1 (Dean Shek))
- Born on the Fourth of July (1993 TV Asahi edition) (Steve Boyer (Jerry Levine))
- Boychoir (Carvelle (Dustin Hoffman))
- The Bridge on the River Kwai (Commander Shears (William Holden))
- Bringing Down the House (Peter Sanderson (Steve Martin))
- The Bronze (Stan Greggory (Gary Cole))
- Carlito's Way (David Kleinfeld (Sean Penn))
- City Slickers (Mitch Robbins (Billy Crystal))
- Coming to America (1991 Fuji TV edition) (Semmi, Reverend Brown, Morris, Extremely Ugly Girl (Arsenio Hall))
- Conan the Destroyer (Malak (Tracey Walter))
- Constantine (Lucifer Morningstar (Peter Stormare))
- Criminal Activities (Eddie (John Travolta))
- Cry Macho (Howard Polk (Dwight Yoakam))
- Dark Water (Jeff Platzer (Tim Roth))
- Date Night (Phil Foster (Steve Carell))
- Desperado (Buscemi (Steve Buscemi))
- Diary of a Wimpy Kid series (Frank Heffley (Steve Zahn))
- Die Hard (1990 TV Asahi edition) (Richard Thornburg (William Atherton))
- The Face Reader (Nae-gyeong (Song Kang-ho))
- The Fifth Element (1999 NTV edition) (Korben Dallas (Bruce Willis))
- Gentlemen Broncos (Bronco/Brutus (Sam Rockwell))
- Ghostbusters II (1998 TV Asahi edition) (Raymond Stantz (Dan Aykroyd))
- Godzilla: King of the Monsters (Dr. Rick Stanton (Bradley Whitford))
- Goodfellas (Henry Hill (Ray Liotta))
- The Great Escape (2000 TV Tokyo edition) (Captain Virgil Hilts (Steve McQueen))
- The Green Hornet (Benjamin Chudnofsky (Christoph Waltz))
- Growing Pains (Doctor Jason Seaver (Alan Thicke))
- The Hand That Rocks the Cradle (Michael Bartel (Matt McCoy))
- Hardcastle and McCormick (first season) (Mark "Skid" McCormick (Daniel Hugh Kelly))
- Hardcore Henry (Henry's Father (Tim Roth))
- Horrible Bosses 2 (Bert Hanson (Christoph Waltz))
- Imposters (Max (Brian Benben))
- In a Valley of Violence (Marshal Clyde Martin (John Travolta))
- Intimate Strangers (William (Fabrice Luchini))
- Jappeloup (2021 BS TV Tokyo edition) (Marcel Rozier (Tchéky Karyo))
- John Wick (Winston (Ian McShane))
- John Wick: Chapter 2 (Winston (Ian McShane))
- John Wick: Chapter 3 – Parabellum (Winston (Ian McShane))
- John Wick: Chapter 4 (Winston (Ian McShane))
- Kiss of Death (Little Junior Brown (Nicolas Cage))
- Larry Crowne (Larry Crowne (Tom Hanks))
- Little House on the Prairie (Percival Dalton/Isaac Cohen (Steve Tracy))
- Looking for Mr. Goodbar (James (William Atherton))
- Mad Max: Fury Road (2019 THE CINEMA edition) (Immortan Joe (Hugh Keays-Byrne))
- Major League: Back to the Minors (Gus Cantrell (Scott Bakula))
- Master with Cracked Fingers (Landlord (Dean Shek))
- Mega Shark Versus Crocosaurus (Nigel Putnam (Gary Stretch))
- A Midsummer Night's Dream (Nick Bottom (Kevin Kline))
- The Missing (Captain Sam Webster (David Morrissey))
- Monty Python (Graham Chapman (second voice))
- Much Ado About Nothing (Benedick (Kenneth Branagh))
- Multiplicity (Doug Kinney (Michael Keaton))
- Muppets Tonight (Kermit the Frog)
- My Lucky Stars (Herb (Charlie Chin))
- New World (Kang Hyung-cheol (Choi Min-sik))
- Night of the Living Dead (Harry Cooper (Karl Hardman))
- Nightmare Alley (Ezra Grindle (Richard Jenkins))
- Not a Penny More, Not a Penny Less (Jean-Pierre Lamanns (François-Éric Gendron))
- Nothing but Trouble (Chris Thorne (Chevy Chase))
- Once Upon a Time in Hollywood (Randy Miller (Kurt Russell))
- One Battle After Another (Colonel Steven J. Lockjaw (Sean Penn))
- Only Murders in the Building (Teddy Dimas (Nathan Lane))
- Philadelphia (Joe Miller (Denzel Washington))
- Platoon (1989 TV Asahi edition) (Lieutenant Wolfe (Mark Moses))
- Point of No Return (Bob (Gabriel Byrne))
- Potiche (Robert Pujol (Fabrice Luchini))
- Pulp Fiction (Pumpkin (Tim Roth))
- Quantum Leap (Sam Beckett (Scott Bakula))
- Red 2 (The Frog (David Thewlis))
- The Reincarnation of Peter Proud (Dr. Peter Proud (Michael Sarrazin))
- Reservoir Dogs (Mr. Orange/Freddy Newandyke (Tim Roth))
- Roald Dahl's Esio Trot (Mr Henry Hoppy (Dustin Hoffman))
- Safe House (Robert (Christopher Eccleston))
- Saving Mr. Banks (Walt Disney (Tom Hanks))
- Shanghai Knights (Roy O'Bannon (Owen Wilson))
- The Shape of Water (Giles (Richard Jenkins))
- Shark Lake (Don Barnes (James Chalke))
- Sideways (Miles Raymond (Paul Giamatti))
- Smash (Terrence Falls (Sean Hayes))
- Sneakers (1998 NTV edition) (Martin Bishop/Martin Brice (Robert Redford))
- Stanley & Iris (Stanley Cox (Robert De Niro))
- Stealing Home (Alan Appleby (Harold Ramis))
- Swordfish (2005 NTV edition) (Gabriel Shear (John Travolta))
- Tango & Cash (Gabriel "Gabe" Cash (Kurt Russell))
- Thirteen Days (John F. Kennedy (Bruce Greenwood))
- Three Men and a Baby (Michael Kellam (Steve Guttenberg))
- Tombstone (Doc Holliday (Val Kilmer))
- Trading Places (1992 Fuji TV edition) (Louis Winthorpe III (Dan Aykroyd))
- True Lies (Albert Mike Gibson (Tom Arnold))
- Vertigo (2012 Blu-Ray edition) (John "Scottie" Ferguson (James Stewart))
- We're No Angels (Jim (Sean Penn))
- West Side Story (1979 TBS edition) (Snowboy (Bert Michaels))
- Who Is Killing the Great Chefs of Europe? (Ravello (Gigi Proietti))
- Willy Wonka & the Chocolate Factory (Willy Wonka (Gene Wilder))
- Win Win (Mike Flaherty (Paul Giamatti))
- Yellowstone (Chief Thomas Rainwater (Gil Birmingham))
- Zoom (Jack Shepard/Captain Zoom (Tim Allen))

==== Animation ====
- Aladdin (Prince Achmed)
- Aladdin (TV series) (Abis Mal)
- Balto II: Wolf Quest (Boris)
- Batman: The Animated Series (The Riddler)
- The Boss Baby: Back in Business (Boss Baby)
- The Catillac Cats (Grandpa, Leroy)
- A Christmas Carol (Bob Cratchit/Jacob Marley)
- Elio (Tegmen)
- Ice Age (Oscar)
- Love, Death & Robots (Mason)
- Mulan (Chi-Fu)
- The Pagemaster (Tom Morgan)
- Pocahontas (Wiggins)
- The Rescuers (Bernard, 2000 dub)
- The Return of Jafar (Abis Mal)
- We're Back! A Dinosaur's Story (Stubbs the Clown)
- X-Men (Gambit)
- Zentrix (Dr Coy)
