= Song of Baseball Enthusiasts =

Japanese manga series

- Cover of the first volume

野球狂の詩 (Yakyū-kyō no Uta)
- Genre: Baseball
- Manga
- Written by: Shinji Mizushima
- Published by: Kodansha
- Magazine: Weekly Shōnen Magazine
- Original run: 1972 – 1976
- Volumes: 17
- Live-action film
- Directed by: Akira Katō
- Produced by: Hiromi Higuchi
- Written by: Masayasu Ōehara, Rokurō Kumagaya
- Music by: Shin Takada
- Studio: Nikkatsu
- Released: March 19, 1977
- Runtime: 93 minutes
- Anime television series
- Directed by: Tameo Kohanawa
- Produced by: Tadami Watanabe; Yoshio Kato
- Music by: Michiaki Watanabe
- Studio: Nippon Animation
- Original network: FNS (Fuji TV)
- Original run: December 23, 1977 – March 26, 1979
- Episodes: 25
- Anime film

Yakyū-kyō no Uta: Kita no Ōkami, Minami no Tora
- Directed by: Eiji Okabe
- Produced by: Kōichi Motohashi
- Music by: Taiji Nakamura
- Studio: Nippon Animation
- Released: September 15, 1979
- Runtime: 90 minutes
- Television drama
- Produced by: Setsurō Wakamatsu
- Written by: Keiji Okutsu
- Studio: Fuji Television; Telepack
- Original network: Fuji TV
- Original run: January 7, 1985
- Manga

Yakyū-kyō no Uta Heisei-hen
- Written by: Shinji Mizushima
- Published by: Kodansha
- Magazine: Mr. Magazine
- Original run: 1997 – 2000
- Volumes: 3
- Manga

Shin Yakyū-kyō no Uta
- Written by: Shinji Mizushima
- Published by: Kodansha
- Magazine: Morning
- Original run: 2000 – 2005
- Volumes: 11
- icon

Song of Baseball Enthusiasts (Japanese: 野球狂の詩, Hepburn: Yakyū-kyō no Uta) is a Japanese manga series written and illustrated by Shinji Mizushima. It follows Yūki Mizuhara, a young woman who wants to do veterinary medicine at college but instead she became a baseball player. It was originally serialized in the Kodansha's Japanese manga magazine Weekly Shōnen Magazine between 1972 and 1976 and has been adapted into several spin-off manga, a live-action film, an anime television series, an anime film, and a Japanese television drama. In 1973, it received the 4th Kōdansha Literature Culture Award for children's manga.

== Media ==
=== Manga ===
The Yakyū-kyō no Uta manga series was written and illustrated by Shinji Mizushima, and originally serialized by Kodansha in Weekly Shōnen Magazine from 1972 to 1976. It was published into a single tankōbon volume on October 1, 1972, on June 16, 1974, on January 25, 1976, and on January 21, 1979. Between July 12, 1995, and October 12, 1995, it was published in 13 bunkoban. A four-shinsōban version subtitled Best Nine Selection (ベストナイン・セレクション, Besuto Nain Serekushon) was released between November 21, 1997, and June 23, 1998.

In 1997, a new series entitled Yakyū-kyō no Uta Heisei-hen (野球狂の詩 平成編) started to be serialized by Kodansha in Mr. Magazine. Later, it was collected into 3 tankōbon released between August 7, 1998, and March 9, 2000. Shin Yakyū-kyō no Uta (新・野球狂の詩) was published on 11 tankōbon between January 23, 2001, and October 21, 2005.

Four bound volumes were published under Platinum Comics line between June 11, 2003, and July 23, 2003: Iwata Tetsugorō-hen (岩田鉄五郎編), Kokuritsu-dama Ichirō-hen (国立玉一郎編), Hiura Ken-hen (火浦健編), and Yakyū Shokunin-den-hen (野球職人伝編).

A crossover manga between Yakyū-kyō no Uta and Dokaben, another Mizushima manga, was first published in 2005. On February 8, 2006, it was released by Kodansha in a bound volume under the title Yakyū-kyō no Uta Vs. Dokaben (野球狂の詩 VS. ドカベン). Later, on September 30, 2009, a "Superstars Edition" (スーパースターズ編) was published.

On February 10, 2009, a series entitled Shinsō-ban Yakyū-kyō no Uta: Mizuhara Yūki-hen (新装版 野球狂の詩 水原勇気編), that follows the story of Yūki Mizuhara, a real-life female baseball player, started to be published. Spawning three bound volumes, it was last published on April 10, 2009, by Kodansha.

=== Live-action film ===
Akira Katō directed a live-action adaptation that was released on March 19, 1977. It starred Midori Kinouchi, was produced by Hiromi Higuchi, written by Masayasu Ōehara and Rokurō Kumagaya, and its score was composed by Shin Takada.

==== Cast ====
- Midori Kinouchi as Yuki Mizuhara
- Asao Koike as Tetsugoro Iwata
- Hiroshi Inuzuka as Mizuhara
- Katsuya Nomura as himself
- Kei Tani as Sentaro
- Jūkei Fujioka as Matsukawa

=== Anime ===
A 25-episode anime television series was created by Nippon Animation, and was broadcast on Fuji Television between December 23, 1977, and March 26, 1979. An anime film titled Yakyū-kyō no Uta: Kita no Ōkami, Minami no Tora (野球狂の詩 北の狼・南の虎) was released in theatres on September 15, 1979, and shown together with the first Future Boy Conan compilation movie.

=== TV drama ===
The series was adapted into a live-action Japanese television drama broadcast on January 7, 1985, on Fuji Television.
