= Ola Fogelberg =

Finnish cartoonist (1894–1952)

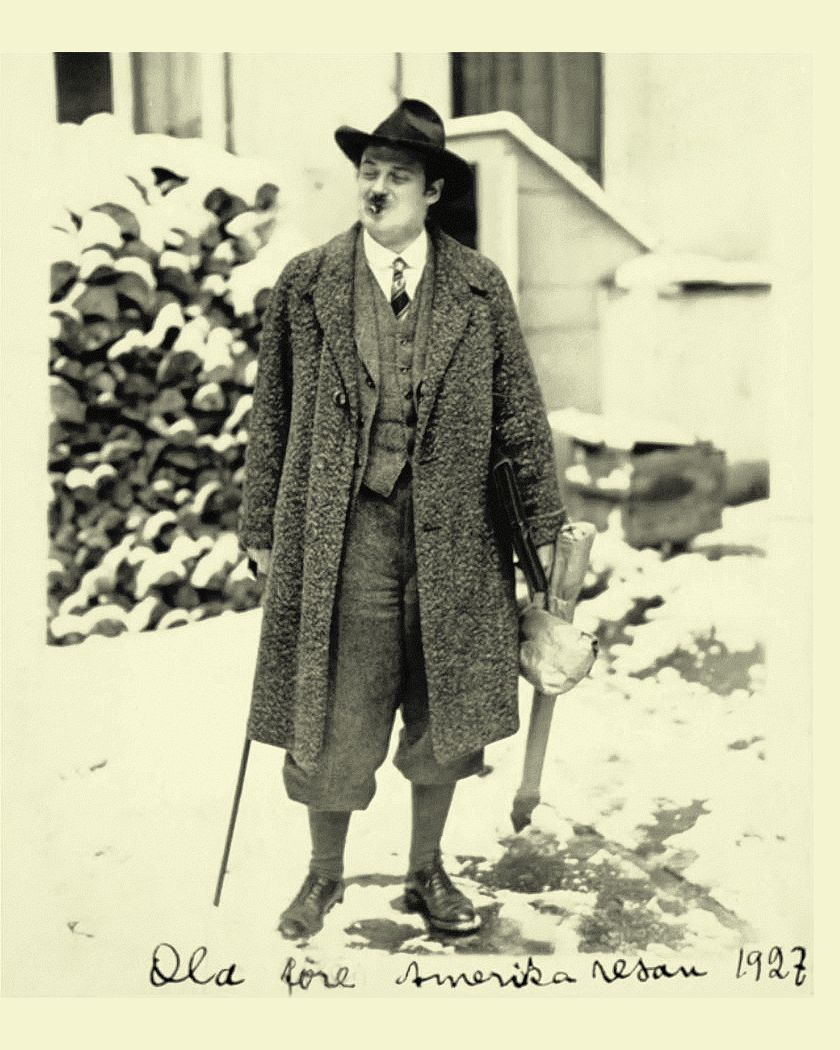
- Ola Fogelberg in 1927
- Born: June 20, 1894 Helsinki, Grand Duchy of Finland
- Died: August 25, 1952 (aged 58) Ekenäs, Finland
- Areas: Cartoonist, comic artist
- Notable works: Pekka Puupää, Janne Ankkanen

Ola ”Fogeli” Fogelberg (20 June 1894 - 25 August 1952) was a Finnish cartoonist who was one of the pioneers of Finnish comic strips. Fogelberg is best known of his text comic Pekka Puupää.
