= Vahan Shirvanian =

American cartoonist

Vahan Shirvanian (February 10, 1925, in Hackensack, New Jersey – January 30, 2013, in Mountain Lakes, New Jersey) was an American cartoonist, best known for his comic strip No Comment. He received the National Cartoonist Society Gag Cartoon Award in 1959 for his work.
