= Serge Diantantu =

Congolese comic book artist (1960–2022)

- Born: 4 May 1960; Mbanza-Ngungu, Belgian Congo
- Died: 1 June 2022 (aged 62)
- Occupation: Comic book artist

Serge Diantantu (4 May 1960 – 1 June 2022) was a Congolese comic book artist, caricaturist, and writer.

== Works ==
=== Comic books ===
- Simon Kimbangu - Tome 1 : Simon Kimbangu (2004)
- La petite Djily et mère Mamou (2008)
- Mémoire de l'esclavage - Tome 1 : Bulambemba (2010)
- Mémoire de l'esclavage - Tome 2 : En naviguant vers les Indes (2011)
- Mémoire de l'esclavage - Tome 3 : L'embarquement de bois d'ébène (2012)
- Mémoire de l'esclavage - Tome 4 : Ile de Gorée (2014)
- Mémoire de l'esclavage - Tome 5 : Colonies des Antilles et de l'Océan (2015)
- Félix Éboué, le héros de la France Libre (2016)
- Samantha et Ségou - Tome 1 : Samantha et Ségou visitent la Guyane (2020)

=== Books, essays ===
- Femme noire, je vous salue (2008)
- Femme noire d'Afrique, d'Amérique et des Antilles (2011)
- Homme noir d'Afrique, d'Amérique et des Antilles (2012)

=== Illustrations ===
- Il fut un jour à Gorée (2006)

== Distinctions ==
- Prix de la bande dessinée engagée à Lyon (2008)
- Prix Fetkann! de la jeunesse (2013)
