= Jacques Nicolaou =

French comic book author (1930–2022)

- Born: 7 October 1930; Châtenay-Malabry, France
- Died: 30 May 2022 (aged 91)
- Occupation: Comic book author

Jacques Nicolaou (7 October 1930 – 30 May 2022) was a French comic book artist.

== Biography ==
After illustrating on an amateur level, Nicolaou began animating games in Les aventures de Pif le chien for Vaillant. He then took over for José Cabrero Arnal in illustrating Placid et Muzo and worked for Pif Gadget, Dimanche Fillette, and Les Rois du Rire. For Pif Gadget, he illustrated the series Pifou and Le Grêlé 7/13 with Roger Lécureux.

After his retirement, he began to work with watercolors while returning to Placid et Muzo on occasion.

Nicolaou died on 30 May 2022, at the age of 91.
