= The Lighter Side Of... =

American satirical comic strip series

"The Lighter Side Of..." is an American satirical comic strip series written and drawn by Dave Berg and published in Mad Magazine from 1961 to 2002.

== Concept ==
"The Lighter Side Of..." gently satirized everyday topics such as medicine, office life, parties, marriage, psychiatry, shopping, and school. Originally Berg would take an omnibus topic (such as "Noise", "Spectators", or "Dog Owners") and deliver approximately 15 short multi-panel cartoons on the subject. From late 1980 on he used multiple topics for each installment.

The series had no recurring characters, except for the hypochondriac Roger Kaputnik, his family, and his personal doctor, who typically concluded every monthly installment. Kaputnik was a self-caricature. Berg also caricatured his colleagues, including publisher William M. Gaines, whenever he drew gags based around an office. After Gaines died in 1992, his portrait was often seen mounted on a wall.

Compared to much of the other content in Mad Magazine the strip was notable for being more old-fashioned and less brutal in its style of comedy. The drawing style was also more realistic. Still, according to Mad's editors, "The Lighter Side" was one of the magazine's most popular features. After Berg died the strip was retired.

== Homages and reboots ==
Four months after the last Berg artwork was published, his final set of gags, which Berg had written but not penciled, were published in Mad as a tribute. They were divided among 18 of the magazine's regular artists, including Jack Davis' last original work for Mad. In 2007, an occasional feature called "The Darker Side of the Lighter Side" debuted, which consisted of reprinted Berg strips, with rewritten word balloons that changed the gags to black comedy topics. From October 2018 to December 2019, the Burbank reboot of Mad featured a modern reboot of the strip by writer Tammy Golden and artist Jon Adams, which was canceled when the magazine switched to mostly-reprint content in 2020.

== Publications ==
Sixteen original collections by Berg were published as paperbacks between 1964 and 1987.

== Berg paperbacks ==
Year	Title	ISBN
1964	Mad's Dave Berg Looks at the U.S.A.	ISBN 978-0-446-35422-6
1966	Mad's Dave Berg Looks at People	ISBN 978-0-446-86132-8
1967	Mad's Dave Berg Looks at Things	ISBN 978-0-446-94403-8
1969	Mad's Dave Berg Looks at Modern Thinking	ISBN 978-0-446-30434-4
1971	Mad's Dave Berg Looks at Our Sick World	ISBN 978-0-446-94404-5
1972	Mad's Dave Berg: My Friend God	ISBN 978-0-451-06976-4
1973	Mad's Dave Berg Looks at Living	ISBN 978-0-446-75697-6
1974	Mad's Dave Berg: Roger Kaputnik and God	ISBN 978-0-451-06106-5
1975	Mad's Dave Berg Looks Around	ISBN 978-0-446-30432-0
1977	Dave Berg: Mad Trash	ISBN 978-0-446-87938-5
1977	Mad's Dave Berg Takes a Loving Look	ISBN 978-0-446-88860-8
1979	Mad's Dave Berg Looks, Listens and Laughs	ISBN 978-0-446-88667-3
1982	Mad's Dave Berg Looks at You	ISBN 978-0-446-34792-1
1984	Mad's Dave Berg Looks at the Neighborhood	ISBN 978-0-446-30350-7
1986	Mad's Dave Berg Looks at Our Planet	ISBN 978-0-446-32310-9
1987	Mad's Dave Berg Looks at Today	ISBN 978-0-446-34423-4

== In popular culture ==
The artist's lightweight gags and sometimes moralistic tone were sharply satirized by the National Lampoon's 1971 Mad parody, which included a hard-hatted conservative and a longhaired hippie finding their only common ground by choking and beating Berg for being a "wishy-washy liberal".

Bart Simpson reads "The Lighter Side Of... Hippies" in The Simpsons episode "Bart of Darkness" and laughs: "They don't care whose toes they step on!" In "The City of New York vs. Homer Simpson", Bart visits Mad Magazine's headquarters, where he witnesses Alfred E. Neuman calling for "Kaputnik and Fonebone" (the latter being a regular character in Don Martin's comics). While Neuman is yelling, Kaputnik is walking right behind him.

In Family Guy's parody of The Return of the Jedi, the episode "It's A Trap!", Chris Griffin (as Luke Skywalker) suggests that Stewie Griffin (as Darth Vader) should hang out on the "lighter side" instead of "the dark side of the force". This leads to a cutaway which spoofs the comic strip.
