= Abu-san =

Japanese manga series

- Cover of the first tankōbon volume, featuring Yasutake Kageura (front)

あぶさん
- Genre: Sports
- Manga
- Written by: Shinji Mizushima
- Published by: Shogakukan
- Imprint: Big Comics
- Magazine: Big Comic Original
- Original run: 1973 – 2014
- Volumes: 107

Abu-san (Japanese: あぶさん) is a baseball manga series written and illustrated by Shinji Mizushima. It tells the story of fictional baseball player Yasutake Kageura (景浦安武, Kageura Yasutake). It started to be serialized in 1973 in Shogakukan's seinen manga magazine Big Comic Original, and ended on February 5, 2014, after 976 chapters published in the magazine. The first manga volume was released on May 15, 1974 and the last one, the 107th volume, was released on March 28, 2014.

In 1977, it received the Shogakukan Manga Award for general manga. In 2004, Mizushima auctioned off the right to appear as a character in Abu-san for over ¥3 million, as a fundraiser for Mangajapan. As of 2013, the series has sold over 22 million copies.

The Fukuoka SoftBank Hawks currently honours Squad no.90, which belongs to Yasutake Kageura.
