= Calvi (author) =

French cartoonist, caricaturist, and illustrator (1938–2022)

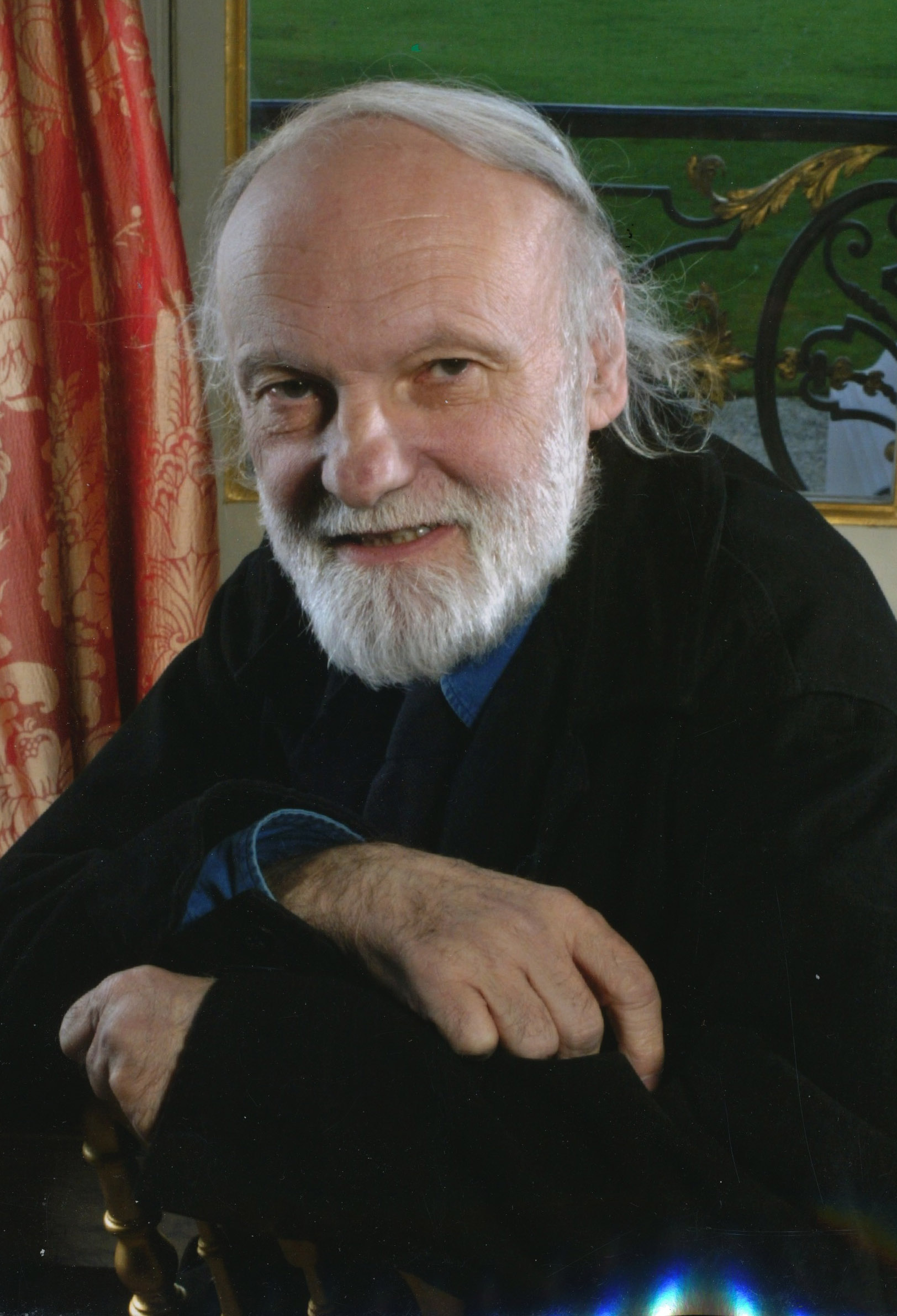
- Calvi in 2013
- Born: Philippe Vallancien; 3 September 1938; Besançon, France
- Died: 11 April 2022 (aged 83)
- Education: Lycée Janson-de-Sailly; École supérieure de journalisme de Paris
- Occupation: Cartoonist

Philippe Vallancien (3 September 1938 – 11 April 2022), known professionally as Calvi, was a French cartoonist, caricaturist, and illustrator.

== Biography ==
After earning his baccalauréat and attending law school for one year, Vallancien entered the École supérieure de journalisme de Paris. He began drawing for Combat in 1959, then for Aux écoutes, Charivari, Rire, and Télérama. He served in the French Armed Forces from 1961 to 1963 and subsequently returned to illustrating for the same newspapers. He joined Le Journal du Dimanche in 1967 and later France-Soir, directed by Pierre Lazareff. He also drew for the program Le Luron du Dimanche, hosted by Thierry Le Luron and Étienne Mougeotte.

Calvi left France-Soir in 1972 and began collaborating with Le Monde under the leadership of André Fontaine. His works were published in multiple other newspapers, such as Le Dauphiné libéré, Midi Libre, L'Est Républicain, Les Dernières Nouvelles d'Alsace, Nice-Matin, Sud Ouest, and La Dépêche du Midi. At the same time, he was called by Le Figaro to illustrate on political pages, and continued to do so for 21 years. In 1981, Louis Pauwels called on him to collaborate with Le Figaro Magazine. He then began to paint, assisted by his wife, Françoise. For Le Figaro Magazine Calvi illustrated the column of Philippe Bouvard. He also illustrated the editorial column of Valeurs actuelles until 2005.

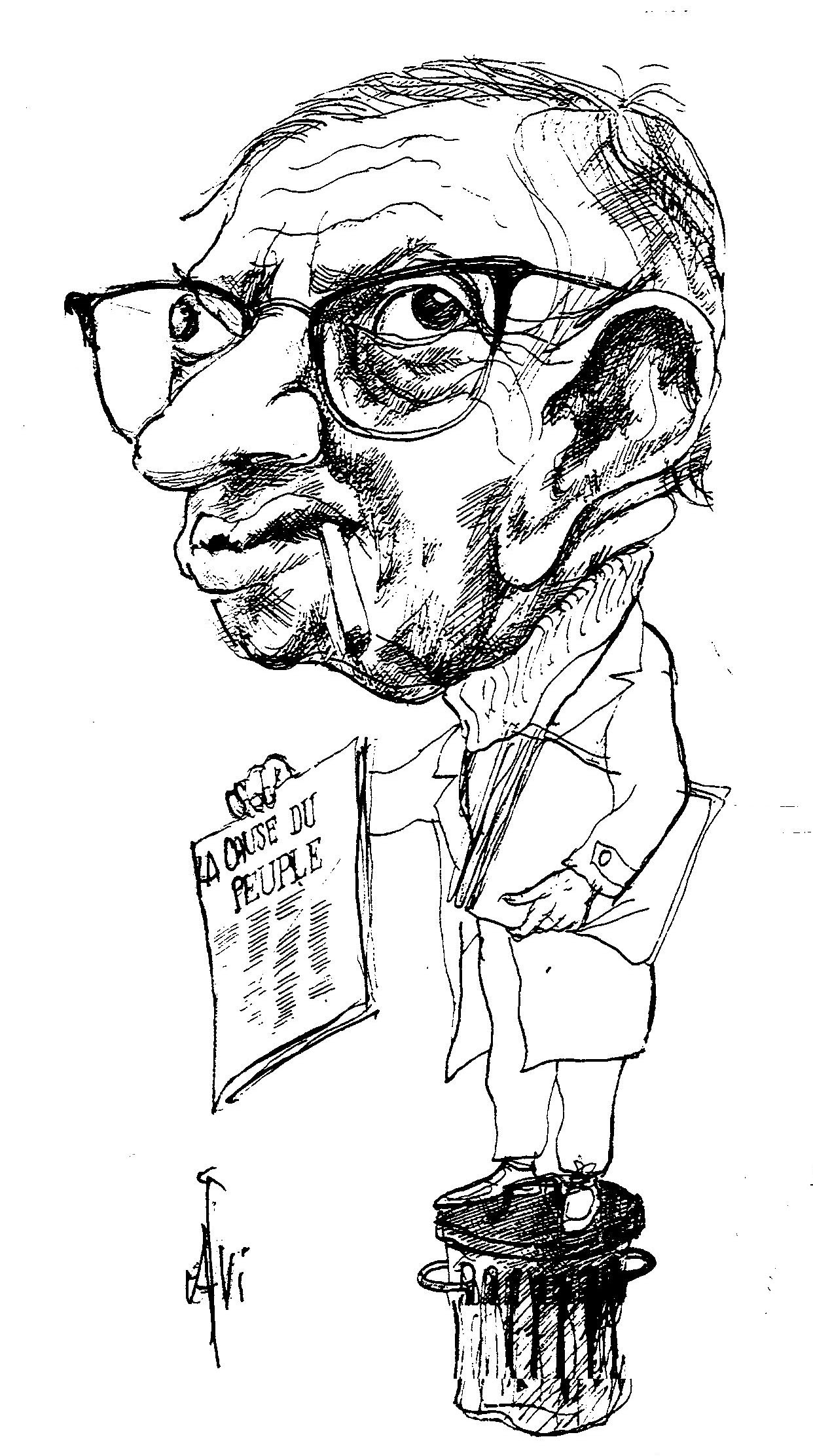
Calvi's caricature of Jean-Paul Sartre selling La Cause du peuple

Calvi died on 11 April 2022 at the age of 83.

== Bibliography ==
- Ah quelle année (1969)
- Le Temps des crises (1975)
- La France S.O.S.ialiste (1983)
- L’Addition (1985)
- Monsieur MITTERRAC (1986)
- La Foire du trône (1988)
- Les Carnets secrets de Marianne (1988)
- Don Mitterrone, le Parrain (1988)
- Le Code de la route (1992)
- L’Histoire de France de Clovis à Chirac (1996)
- Tout baigne (1998)
- La Sarko-attitude (2008)
- L’Histoire de France de Clovis à Nicolas Ier (2008)
