= Alain Saint-Ogan =

French comics author and artist

- Born: Alain Marie Joseph Paul Louis Fernand Lefebvre Saint-Ogan; August 7, 1895 Colombes, France
- Died: June 22, 1974 (aged 78) Paris, France
- Areas: Writer, Artist
- Notable works: Zig et Puce; Monsieur Poche

Alain Saint-Ogan (French: [sɛ̃.t‿ɔ.ɡɑ̃]; August 7, 1895 – June 22, 1974) was a French comics author and artist. He is best remembered for his long-running humorous children's adventure comic Zig et Puce. He was also active as an editorial cartoonist, a children's radio show presenter, a book illustrator, advertising artist and an animator.

== Biography ==
In 1916, during World War I, Alain Saint-Ogan was drafted into the French army and became a soldier fighting in the Balkans.

In 1925, he created and wrote the well-known comic strip Zig et Puce (Zig and Flea), which initially appeared in the Dimanche Illustré (Sunday Illustrated), the weekly youth supplement of the French daily newspaper, l'Excelsior.

Among his other comic strips: Mitou et Toti (Mitou and Toti), Prosper l'ours (Prosper the Bear, started in 1933), Monsieur Poche (Mr. Pocket, started in 1934), and Touitoui. In the 1940s, he edited a children's magazine, Benjamin, for which he created the comic strip Troc et Boum (Troc and Boom). In 1934, Saint-Ogan adapted Prosper L'Ours into an animated short. Hard times came for Alain Saint-Ogan and other people in France arrived during World War II when Nazi Germany invaded and occupied France. Saint-Ogan lived in southern France which was ruled by Vichy France from 1940 to 1942, before it was occupied by Nazi Germany. During this time, Saint-Ogan began writing his comic strips with more ideological considerations and more institutionalized circles such as the state, ministry, union and official commissions.

Zig et Puce enjoyed a revival in 1963, when it was taken over by Greg. After World War II, Alain Saint-Ogan also created a daily cartoon for the front page of the Parisien libéré, hosted a radio program, produced television programs and wrote several books, including two memoirs. Shortly before his death in 1974, he was named the honorary president of the first Angoulême International Comics Festival. For a period, the prize for best comic book was named "Alfred" after his creation.

His work included themes of pro-colonialism ideas. When the French Communist party opposed the Exposition Coloniale of 1931, he contributed to the parody of their newspaper, essentially mocking their anti-imperialist views and showing strong support for the colonial discourse of the Exposition. His comics were used to stir up interest among the young for the Exposition and to support the French colonial effort in the effort to ensure its continuation.

His work contains imagery supporting colonialism and anti-semitism. The story line where Zig and Puce visited the Exposition Coloniale contains racial stereotypes such as portraying Africans as cannibals, continuing the racial stereotype that Africans are just 'big children', having them appear dumb by speaking only in pidgin French, and drawing them with physical stereotypes that French held about Africans (huge lips, very dark skin, etc.).
