= Zig et Puce =

Belgian comic series (1925–1969)

- Main characters Puce, Zig and Alfred on the cover of the first album from 1929
- Author(s): Alain Saint-Ogan, Greg
- Current status/schedule: Discontinued
- Launch date: 1925
- End date: 1969
- Publisher(s): Hachette, Le Lombard, Futuropolis, Glénat, Regards
- Genre(s): Adventure

Zig et Puce is a Franco-Belgian comics series created by Alain Saint-Ogan in 1925 that became popular and influential over a long period. After ending production, it was revived by Greg for a second successful publication run.

== Synopsis ==
Zig and Puce, the thin and the chubby one, respectively, are two teenagers who frequently experience adventures. On an expedition to the North Pole they meet their pet auk, Alfred. Their adventures are often exotic, and occasionally fantastic in nature, leading to destinations such as Venus or the future.

== Publication history ==
Zig et Puce first appeared in the Dimanche Illustré, weekly supplement of the French newspaper l'Excelsior, on 3 May 1925. The third major character, Alfred, made his first appearance on 25 December 1925. The series' style was influenced by the Art-Deco design of the period, and its engaging stories are suggested to be the main reason for its wide appeal among both adults and youth, and the subsequent success of the series. It is also considered the earliest French comic strip to employ speech bubbles, the device which was popularized by The Yellow Kid. After a long run of serial and album publications, Saint-Ogan ceased to produce the series in 1954.

The series was later revived by Greg who, with the consent of Saint-Ogan, resumed production in the Franco-Belgian comics magazine Tintin. It was first published on 26 March 1963 and continued serial publication until 1969.

== Influences ==
As a seminal comic strip in the bande dessinée culture, although appearing several years after Les Pieds Nickelés, Zig et Puce made an influential impact a few years before the debut of Hergé and The Adventures of Tintin. The character of Alfred is also considered a pioneering central animal character, in the tradition of Franco-Belgian comics animals such as Milou (Snowy), Spip, Jocko, Jolly Jumper, Marsupilami and Idéfix (Dogmatix).

Alfred the auk was chosen as mascot by Charles Lindbergh when he landed in Paris on board the Spirit of St. Louis on the arrival of his first transatlantic flight in May 1927. There, an American lady gave him a plush effigy of Alfred, which Lindbergh took with him in his flight from Paris to Brussels.

The character Alfred was chosen as the mascot of the 1974 Angoulême Comics Festival, and the name given to an award. The term Alfred was used until 1989 when it was renamed Alph'art (in honor of the last Adventures of Tintin comic Tintin and Alph-Art).

== Albums ==
=== Alain Saint-Ogan ===
Lists French album titles, titles translated into English, the first year of publication in album format, and the date of republication by Glénat. At least for the first nine albums, the republished Glénat versions have between 1 and 24 pages not included in the originals.

- 1. Zig et Puce (Zig and Puce), 1927, Glénat 1995.
- 2. Zig et Puce millionnaires (Zig and Puce, Millionnaires), 1928, Glénat 1995.
- 3. Zig, Puce et Alfred (Zig, Puce and Alfred), 1929, Glénat 1995.
- 4. Zig et Puce à New-York (Zig and Puce in New York), 1930, Glénat 1995.
- 5. Zig et Puce cherchent Dolly (Zig and Puce look for Dolly), 1931, Glénat 1995.
- 6. Zig et Puce aux Indes (Zig and Puce in South Asia), 1932, Glénat 1995.
- 7. Zig, Puce et Furette (Zig, Puce and Furette), 1933, Glénat 1996.
- 8. Zig, Puce et la petite princesse (Zig, Puce and the Little Princess), 1933, Glénat 1996.
- 9. Zig et Puce au XXIè siècle (Zig and Puce in the 21st Century), 1935, Glénat 1997.
- 10. Zig et Puce Ministres (Ministers Zig and Puce), unknown, Glénat 1997.
- 11. Zig et Puce and le Professeur Médor followed by Revoilà Zig et Puce (Zig and Puce and Professor Médor ) and (Zig and Puce Again), unknown, Glénat 1997, only the first story. The second was republished in a separate album, Glénat 1998.
- 12. Zig et Puce et l'homme invisible (Zig and Puce and the Invisible Man), 1949, Glénat 1998.
- 13. Zig et Puce et le complot (Zig and Puce and the Conspiracy), 1950, Glénat 1999.
- 14. Zig et Puce et le cirque (Zig and Puce and the Circus), 1951, Glénat 1999.
- 15. Zig et Puce en Éthiopie (Zig and Puce in Ethiopia), 1952, Glénat 1999.
- 16. Zig et Puce sur Venus (Zig and Puce on Venus), unknown, Glénat 2000.
- 17. Zig, Puce, Nénette et la baronne Truffe (Zig, Puce, Nénette and Baroness Truffe) unknown, Glénat 2001. Multiple stories, printed under slightly different titles.

=== Greg ===
Cover of Le voleur fantôme (1965) by Greg

Lists French titles, titles translated into English, and the first year of publication in album format.

- 1. Le voleur fantôme (The Phantom Robber), 1965.
- 2. S.O.S. 'Sheila' (S.O.S. 'Sheila' ), 1966.
- 3. Le prototype Zèro-Zèro (The Zero-Zero Prototype), 1967.
- 4. La pierre qui vole (The Flying Rock), 1968.
- 5. Les frais de la princesse (The Princess' Expenses), 1970.
- 6. Zig et Puce contre le légume boulimique (Zig and Puce versus the Bulimic Vegetable), after 1966.

== See also ==
• Belgian comics • Franco-Belgian comics

== Sources ==
- Zig, Puce et Alfred publications in Belgian Tintin and French Tintin BDoubliées (in French)
- Zig et Puce original albums and Zig et Puce second series Bedetheque (in French)
