= Shinji Mizushima =

Japanese manga artist (1939–2022)

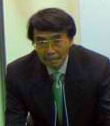
- Mizushima in September 2009
- Born: April 10, 1939; Niigata, Japan
- Died: January 10, 2022 (aged 82); Tokyo, Japan
- Occupation: Manga artist
- Writing career
- Period: 1958–2020
- Notable works: Dokaben; Abu-san
- Notable awards: Shogakukan Manga Award (1974, 1977)

Shinji Mizushima (水島 新司(みずしま しんじ), Mizushima Shinji; April 10, 1939 – January 10, 2022) was a Japanese manga artist. He is best known for several baseball manga, such as Yakyū-kyō no Uta, Dokaben, and Abu-san. He is a two-time recipient of the Shogakukan Manga Award. His works have been collected into more than 540 tankōbon volumes, making him one of the most prolific manga artists of all time.

== Biography ==
Mizushima began his career in 1958 when his debut work, Shinya no Kyaku, was awarded by a local manga magazine based in Osaka. He moved to Tokyo in 1964, where he began to publish numerous works for the Shōnen King magazine. His first serious work involving baseball came in 1969, when he published Ace no Jyōken. He also began to work for the Shōnen Sunday and Shōnen Champion magazines in 1970, where he published his first major hits in Otoko do Ahou Kōshien and Zenikko. His most iconic work, Dokaben, was first serialized on Shōnen Champion in 1972, and Yakyū-kyō no Uta was published in Monthly Shōnen Magazine the same year. Abu-san began publication on Big Comic Original in 1973. He received the Shogakukan Manga Award in 1974 for Otoko do Ahou Kōshien and Deba to Bat, and again in 1977 for Abu-san.

Mizushima's serialized works gained major standing around this period, making him a fixture in the manga industry and the foremost author of baseball manga. In 1975, he published Ikkyu-san; the continuation to Otoko do Ahou Kōshien, for Shōnen Sunday and Kyūdō-kun for Shōnen Big Comic in 1976. In 1977, he started Ikkyū Nyūkon, a magazine specializing in baseball manga, where he serialized Hakkyū no Uta, the counterpart to Yakyū-kyō no Uta set in the Pacific League. In 1981, he began publication of Hikari no Kojirō; an audacious work featuring an entirely original Japanese baseball league and commission.

In 1983, Mizushima published Dai Kōshien; a work featuring characters from Dokaben, Yakyū-kyō no Uta, Otoko do Ahou Kōshien, Ikkyū-san, Kyūdō-kun, and many of the other popular high-school baseball manga he had authored up until then. Mizushima continued to author numerous works through the 1980s, most notably Niji wo Yobu Otoko (1987) and Ohayō K-jirō (1990).

During the 1990s, Mizushima began to build on his most successful works, starting Dokaben Pro-yakyū hen in 1995 on the Shōnen Champion magazine, and Yakyū-kyō no Uta Heisei hen in 1997 for Mister Magazine. Mizushima continued this trend with Shin Yakyū-kyō no Uta (2000) and Dokaben Super Stars hen (2004), and has also continued to author Abu-san, which has spanned over 90 volumes since its inception in 1973. In 2004, Mizushima auctioned off the right to appear as a character in Abu-san for over 3 million yen as a fundraiser for Mangajapan.

Mizushima marked his 50th anniversary as a manga artist in 2007, and Shōnen Champion placed Dokaben on its front cover along with messages and illustrations from many other manga artists such as Osamu Akimoto, Takao Saito, Mitsuru Adachi, Takehiko Inoue, Rumiko Takahashi, Fujiko Fujio, and Hiroshi Takahashi to celebrate Mizushima's achievements. Other enthusiasts and baseball icons including Sadaharu Oh, Shigeo Nagashima, Takeshi Kitano, Hideki Matsui, and Kenji Jojima also contributed messages. Mizushima remained the oldest active manga artist to serialize on weekly publications, 13 years older than the next-youngest artist (Osamu Akimoto).

In 2007, he won the 36th Japan Cartoonists Association Award in the category "Literary Giant Award".

Mizushima announced his retirement on December 1, 2020. His last manga was an Abu-san one-shot published in August 2018. Mizushima died from pneumonia in a Tokyo hospital on January 10, 2022, at the age of 82.

== Works ==
Mizushima is known as an avid Hawks fan, and the title character of Abu-san spends his entire career playing for the Nankai Hawks team. Mizushima depicts real baseball players, coaches, and managers in many of his manga, and the events taking place within his manga often mirror those of the real Japanese baseball world, with his fictitious characters interacting with real existing players. However, non-Japanese baseball players ceased to appear in his works authored during or after the 1990s (with notable exceptions such as Rodney Pedraza and Bobby Valentine, who make very brief appearances), after a non-Japanese player's agent demanded payment for using his client's name and image without permission. Because a single game can sometimes take months of serializations to complete, in certain scenes, Mizushima unknowingly changes the batting order and handedness of less important players. Another staple error in Mizushima's manga is consistency in the type of batting helmet used (the helmet covers the left ear for right-handed hitters, and the right ear of left-handed hitters).

=== List of major works ===
Listed alphabetically except for series works, which are listed chronologically.

Years	Name	Total number of volumes
1974–2015	Abu-san (あぶさん)	107
2009	Abu-san no Yakyuu Jinsei (あぶさんの野球人生‐全56章)	2
1974	Alps-kun (アルプスくん)	2
1983	Dantotsu (ダントツ)	7
1972–1981	Dokaben (ドカベン)	48
1983–1987	Dai-Kōshien (大甲子園)	26
1995–2004	Dokaben Pro-yakyū hen (ドカベン プロ野球編)	52
2004–2012	Dokaben Super Stars hen (ドカベン スーパースターズ編)	45
2012–2018	Dokaben Dream Tournament hen (ドカベン ドリームトーナメント編)	34
2012	Dokaben Dream Tournament hen Bekkan (ドカベン ドリームトーナメント編 別巻 山田太郎に挑む名選手傑作選)	1
1993	Ganbare Drinkers (がんばれドリンカーズ)	2
1984–1986	Gokudō-kun (極道くん)	14
1958	Hakkyū no Uta (白球の詩)	9
1981–1984	Hikari no Kojirō (光の小次郎)	19
1946	Hoero Waka Tora (ほえろ若トラ)	2
1992	I Love Baseball	1
1976	Ikkyū-san (一球さん)	14
1974	Itadaki Yasubē (いただきヤスベエ)	3
2009– ?	Kaa-chan no Kōshien – Taiyō no Seishun	0
1977–1981	Kyūdō-kun (球道)	19
2008– ?	Naite Tamaruka	0
1987–1989	Niji wo Yobu Otoko (虹を呼ぶ男)	10
1989–1995	Ohayō K-jirō (おはようKジロー)	29
1970–1975	Otoko do Ahou Kōshien (男どアホウ甲子園)	28
1988	Stopper (ストッパー)	12
1975	Yakyū Taishō Gen-chan (野球大将ゲンちゃん)	3
1973	Yakyū-kyō no Uta (野球狂の詩)	17
1998	Yakyū-kyō no Uta Heisei hen (野球狂の詩平成編)	3
2000	Shin Yakyū-kyō no Uta (新・やきゅうきょうのうた)	12
2006	Yakyū-kyō no Uta VS. Dokaben (野球狂の詩 VS.ドカベン)	1
1970	Zenikko (銭っ子)	5
