= Sergej Mironović Golovčenko =

Sergej Mironović Golovčenko (Russian: Сергей Миронович Головченко, romanized: Sergey Mironovich Golovchenko; Irkutsk, 1898 – Zagreb, 10 November 1937) was a Croatian-Russian caricaturist, comic book author and writer. He is the author of the series Maks i Maksić, first published in 1925 in the magazine Kopriva, as the first permanent characters of Croatian and Yugoslav comic books.

== Biography ==
=== Maks and Maksić ===
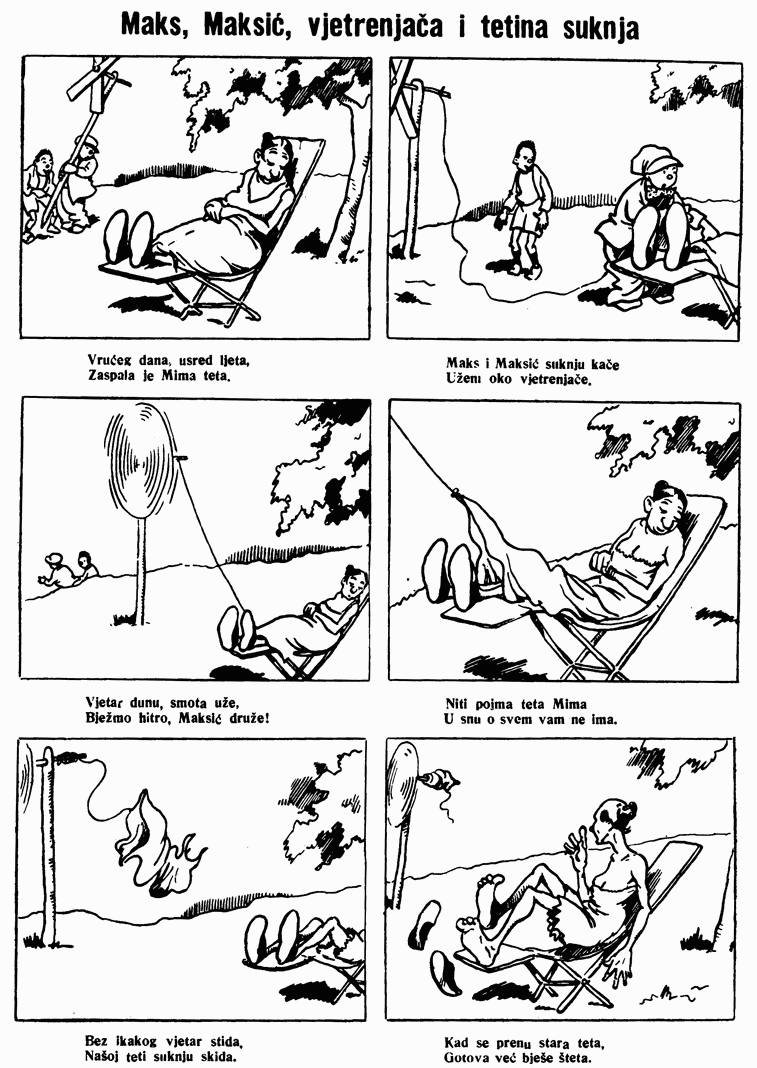
Maks and Maksić (1927)

The creation of the strip series Maks and Maksić was prompted by the then-publisher and owner of the weekly magazine Koprive Slavko Vereš, who attempted to catch up with similar moves by other competing publications such as Jutarnji list, aware that the publication needed a reading section that would appeal to younger audiences. Work on the series was bestowed on Golovčenko, a Russian immigrant, who already had affirmed himself as a fertile and interesting author of caricatures in the magazine.

The comic series drew inspiration heavily from the well-known illustrated German children's book Max und Moritz, created by Wilhelm Busch in the 1860s. Altogether, the series ran from 1925 to 1934 on a weekly basis.

As much as naive as they were, the adventures of Maks and Maksić attained a faithful audience among children, which made the magazine publish a completely separate volume in 1926, containing all the comics published previously in the magazine (altogether 32 color pages). This was followed by the second volume titled S. Mironović – Nove pustolovine Maksa i Maksića (Mironović - New Adventures of Maks and Maksić), published in 1928. The third volume was published in 1929 and the fourth in 1937, only a week before the author's death.

This represented one of the earliest publishing of comics in their separate volume in Europe.
