= Mel Keefer =

American comic artist and illustrator (1926–2022)

- Born: Melvyn Keefer; July 2, 1926; Los Angeles, California, U.S.
- Died: February 11, 2022 (aged 95); Los Angeles, California, U.S.
- Occupation: Comic artist
- Spouses: Rosanne (m. 1951; died 1982): Joyce Eisenberg
- Children: 3

Melvyn Keefer (July 2, 1926 – February 11, 2022) was an American comics artist and illustrator. Best known for the comic strip Mac Divot, he was a lifetime Inkpot Award inductee.

== Life and career ==
Born in Los Angeles, California, Keefer trained as an illustrator at the Santa Monica School of Art run by Jefferson Machamer and the ArtCenter College of Design. He made his debut as a comics artist drawing Perry Mason for King Features Syndicate. He is best known for the long-running golf-themed series Mac Divot, which he created together with Jordan Lanski for the Chicago Tribune Syndicate and which ran for twenty years starting from 1955. Other comic strips Keefer has worked in include Thorne McBride (1960–1963), Rick O'Shay (which he drew between 1978 and 1981) and the comic versions of Dragnet and Gene Autry.

Besides his activity as a cartoonist, Keefer also worked as an illustrator for books, magazines and other publications. He authored the artwork of the Richard Quine's film How to Murder Your Wife. In 2007, Keefer was awarded a lifetime Inkpot Award for his career.

Keefer died on February 11, 2022, at the age of 95.
