= Julio Radilović =

Croatian-Slovenian comic book author (1928–2022)

- Born: 25 September 1928 Maribor, Kingdom of Yugoslavia
- Died: 26 January 2022 Zagreb, Croatia
- Areas: Writer, Artist

Julio Radilović Jules (25 September 1928 – 26 January 2022) was a Croatian comic book author, working in Croatian and Yugoslav comics.

== Biography ==
Julio Radilović was born in Maribor in 1928, and lived in Zagreb from 1939. He began his career in 1945 in the atelier of Mario Saletti as an illustrator. Between 1948 and 1952, he was enrolled at the School of Applied Arts, which he never finished, preferring a career of a free-willed artist. His first published comic was Neznanac (The Unknown), from 1952, and according to a script by Nikša Fulgosi, was published in Horizontov Zabavnik, which he continued to illustrate after Walter Neugebauer, Andrija Maurović and Aleksandar Marks. The comic remained unfinished since Horizontov zabavnik stopped publication during the middle of 1953.

He dealt professionally with comics from 1955 until his retirement in 1989. He mostly collaborated with the scriptwriter Zvonimir Furtinger. He is also known to have been the first president of the Association of strip authors of Croatia and participated in plenty of art exhibitions.

Two of his biggest accomplishments abroad were Herlock Sholmes and Partizani. The latter was drawn according to the dramatic writer Đorđe Lebović.

He is mostly known for the comics dealing with Croatian and world history.

From 1966, he was a member of Croatian Association of Applied Artists.

In the year 2010. he was a recipient of a prize for life's work "Andrija Maurović" which is bestowed by group Art9, whose commission his colleagues and editors.

== Bibliography ==
=== Strip albums ===
- Partizani, Vjesnik, Zagreb, 1985.
- Kroz minula stoljeća, Zagreb, 1986. (scenarist: Zvonimir Furtinger)
- Vitez Trueblood, 1988. (scenarist: Les Lilley)
- Međugorje: Gospa i djeca, vl. naklada, Zagreb, 1989. (scenarist: Ivo Miličević) (tiskan na hrvatskom i još pet svjetskih jezika)
- Martin iz Zagreba, Martin u Zagreb, Povijesni muzej Hrvatske, Zagreb, 1991. (scenarist: Jules po ideji Marije Šercer)
- Pobuna u Kiboku, Zagreb, 2000.
- Velikani u strip-anegdoti, Zagreb, 2003.
- Zakletva huronskog poglavice, Zagreb, 2007.
- Herlock Sholmes: majstor maske, Biblioteka Kroz minula desetljeća, (scenarist: Zvonimir Furtinger), knjiga 1., STRIPFORUM, Zagreb, 2010.; knjiga 2. i knjiga 3., STRIPFORUM, Zagreb, 2013.
