= Orlando Busino =

American cartoonist (1926–2022)

- Born: October 10, 1926; Binghamton, New York, U.S.
- Died: January 11, 2022 (aged 95)

Orlando Busino (October 10, 1926 – January 11, 2022) was an American cartoonist whose cartoons appeared in McCalls, Reader's Digest, Good Housekeeping, Saturday Evening Post, and many other magazines. Among his creations were "Gus," the long-running series of cartoons about a large dog that appeared in Boys' Life magazine.

== Early life ==
Busino grew up in Binghamton, New York. His interest in cartooning started at the age of 9 and by age 14 he sold his first cartoon and gag to the New York Daily Mirror. Busino also won cartoon contests in Open Road for Boys Magazine. In high school, Orlando drew cartoons for the school newspaper, including a regular called "Bulldog, with Central, the Wonder Dog," a super-hero style comic strip. He was drafted into the United States Army and served in Panama at the Albrook Air Force Station for twenty months from 1945 to 1947. While there he drew for the army unit newspaper.

After leaving the army, Busino went to Triple Cities College of Syracuse University (now Binghamton University) and then the University of Iowa, where he graduated in 1952. He drew cartoons both at the Triple Cities College student newspaper and at The Daily Iowan.

== Career ==
After graduating, he moved to New York City where he enrolled in the Cartoonists and Illustrators School at night, while working during the day in the ad department of the Macmillan Publishing Company. After a year of working there, he sold his first cartoon to the Saturday Evening Post, and remained a freelance cartoonist ever since.

Busino also worked for Archie Comics working with George Gladir in the 1960s, doing covers, illustrations, and stories for "Tales Calculated To Drive You Bats." This work was later reprinted in Archie's Madhouse.

In addition to contributing cartoons to a number of leading magazines, Orlando Busino had a long-running series of cartoons called "Gus" in Boys' Life. It was about the antics of a large white dog named Gus. The cartoon first appeared in Boys' Life in January 1970. It took over the honor spot on the "Think & Grin" page and remained there ever since. Gus appeared on the cover of Boys' Life in December 1981.

== Personal life and death ==
Busino lived in Ridgefield, Connecticut. He died on January 11, 2022, at the age of 95.

== Awards ==
He received the National Cartoonist Society Gag Cartoon Award for 1965, 1967, and 1968 for his work.

== Books ==
His cartoons have been anthologized in two books, Good Boy! and Other Animal Cartoons (1980) and Oh, Gus! (1981).
