= Dokaben =

Japanese manga series

- First tankōbon volume cover, featuring Taro Yamada (bottom left)

ドカベン
- Genre: Sports
- Manga
- Written by: Shinji Mizushima
- Published by: Akita Shoten
- Imprint: Shōnen Champion Comics
- Magazine: Weekly Shōnen Champion
- Original run: April 24, 1972 – March 27, 1981
- Volumes: 48
- Anime television series
- Produced by: Tadami Watanabe
- Written by: Eiji Okabe
- Music by: Shunsuke Kikuchi
- Studio: Nippon Animation
- Original network: FNS (Fuji TV)
- Original run: October 6, 1976 – December 26, 1979
- Episodes: 163
- Manga

Dai Kōshien
- Written by: Shinji Mizushima
- Published by: Akita Shoten
- Imprint: Shōnen Champion Comics
- Magazine: Weekly Shōnen Champion
- Original run: March 23, 1983 – August 7, 1987
- Volumes: 26
- Manga

Dokaben Professional Baseball
- Written by: Shinji Mizushima
- Published by: Akita Shoten
- Imprint: Shōnen Champion Comics
- Magazine: Weekly Shōnen Champion
- Original run: March 23, 1995 – December 25, 2003
- Volumes: 52
- Manga

Dokaben Superstars
- Written by: Shinji Mizushima
- Published by: Akita Shoten
- Imprint: Shōnen Champion Comics
- Magazine: Weekly Shōnen Champion
- Original run: January 8, 2004 – May 8, 2012
- Volumes: 45
- Manga

Dokaben Dream Tournament
- Written by: Shinji Mizushima
- Published by: Akita Shoten
- Imprint: Shōnen Champion Comics
- Magazine: Weekly Shōnen Champion
- Original run: May 29, 2012 – June 28, 2018
- Volumes: 34

Dokaben (Japanese: ドカベン) (Note: A dokaben is a kind of bento which the protagonist, Taro Yamada, likes to eat.) is a Japanese baseball manga series written and illustrated by Shinji Mizushima. The original series was serialized in Akita Shoten's shōnen manga magazine Weekly Shōnen Champion from April 24, 1972, to March 27, 1981, but it was followed by several sequel series running until 2018. Chapters of the series were published into 205 tankōbon volumes in total, making it the series with the second highest number of volumes. It was also made into an anime by the same name. It was immensely popular in Japan during its original release, and is one of the most popular sports manga of all time.

== Synopsis ==
Dokaben is centered on Taro Yamada and his teammates Iwaki, Tonoma, and Satonaka and was focused mainly on their activity as a high school baseball team. At first, it focused on Yamada, Iwaki, and Sachiko and was set in Takaoka Middle School. But in Volume 8 the team is transferred to Meikun High School for their baseball skills.

The story of Dokaben continues in Dai Kōshien, Dokaben Pro Baseball Story, and Dokaben SuperStars Story.

== Characters ==
=== Meikun High School baseball team ===
==== Yamada generation ====
Taro Yamada (山田太郎,, Yamada Tarō)
Voiced by: Hideyuki Tanaka
Position: Catcher
Masami Iwaki (岩鬼正美,, Iwaki Masami)
Voiced by: Tessho Genda
Position: Third baseman
Kazuto Tonoma (殿馬一人,, Tonoma Kazuto)
Voiced by: Kaneta Kimotsuki
Position: Second baseman
Satoru Satonaka (里中智,, Satonaka Satoru)
Voiced by: Akira Kamiya
Position: Pitcher
Santaro Hohoemi (微笑三太郎,, Hohoemi Santarō)
Voiced by: Yoshito Yasuhara
Position: Catcher, Left fielder

==== Senior / Younger student ====
Sho Doigaki (土井垣将,, Doigaki Shō)
Voiced by: Katsuji Mori
Position: Catcher, First baseman
Tetsuji Yamaoka (山岡鉄司,, Yamaoka Tetsuji)
Voiced by: Shigeru Chiba
Position: Center fielder
Mitsuo Kita (北満男,, Kita Mitsuo)
Voiced by: Kazuomi Ikeda
Position: Right fielder
Koichi Ishige (石毛幸一,, Ishige Kōichi)
Voiced by: Bungo Nakano
Position: Shortstop
Keiichi Nagisa (渚圭一,, Nagisa Keiichi)
Voiced by: Toshio Furukawa
Position: Pitcher
Tomoaki Takashiro (高代智秋,, Takashiro Tomoaki)
Voiced by: Yū Mizushima
Position: Shortstop, Second baseman

==== Manager ====
Ieyasu Tokugawa (徳川家康,, Tokugawa Ieyasu)
Voiced by: Reizou Nomoto
Manager of Meikun High School baseball team

=== Yamada family ===
Sachiko Yamada (山田サチ子,, Yamada Sachiko)
Voiced by: Minori Matsushima
Taro's 9-year-old little sister
Ji-chan (じっちゃん)
Voiced by: Minoru Yada
Taro's grandfather
"Ji-chan" means grandpa in English

=== Rivals ===
==== Kanagawa ====
Mamoru Shiranui (不知火守,, Shiranui Mamoru)
Voiced by: Osamu Ichikawa
Daigoro Unryu (雲竜大五郎,, Unryū Daigorō)
Voiced by: Hiroshi Ohtake
Gosuke Domon (土門剛介,, Domon Gōsuke)
Voiced by: Mugihito
Goro Tanitsu (谷津吾郎,, Tanitsu Gorō)
Voiced by: Yoku Shioya
Gonza Nankai (南海権左,, Nankai Gonza)
Voiced by: Setsuo Wakui
Shinji Kobayashi (小林真司,, Kobayashi Shinji)
Voiced by: Makio Inoue

==== Kantō ====
Gosuke Gama (賀間剛介,, Gama Gōsuke)
Voiced by: Takeshi Kuwabara
Hayato Kagemaru (影丸隼人,, Kagemaru Hayato)
Voiced by: Masane Tsukayama → Michihiro Ikemizu (ep. 82)
Jiro Kinoshita (木下次郎,, Kinoshita Jirō)
Voiced by: Haruya Kato
Chuji Kunisada (国定忠治,, Kunisada Chūji)
Voiced by: Kaneto Shiozawa
Fumio Ataru (中二美夫,, Ataru Fumio)
Voiced by: Ryoichi Tanaka → Takashi Tanaka

==== Whole Japan ====
Sankichi Sakata (坂田三吉,, Sakata Sankichi)
Voiced by: Yoshito Yasuhara
Kojiro Inukai (犬飼小次郎,, Inukai Kojirō)
Voiced by: Masato Ibu
Takezo Inukai (犬飼武蔵,, Inukai Takezō)
Voiced by: Shingo Kanemoto
Tsutomu Ogata (緒方勉,, Ogata Tsutomu)
Voiced by: Rokuro Naya
Ryo Inugami (犬神了,, Inugami Ryō)
Voiced by: Shun Yashiro
Kazuma Musashibo (武蔵坊数馬,, Musashibō Kazuma)
Voiced by: Osamu Saka
Hikaru Yoshitsune (義経光,, Yoshitsune Hikaru)
Voiced by: Rokuro Naya

=== Others ===
Natsuko Natsukawa (夏川夏子,, Natsukawa Natsuko)
Voiced by: Hiroko Maruyama
Iwaki's girlfriend
Toshiko Kobayashi (小林稔子,, Kobayashi Toshiko)
Voiced by: Mami Koyama
Shinji Kobayashi's little sister

== Video game adaptation ==
In 1989, Capcom released an arcade video game based on the manga.

== Cultural references ==
- In the "Simpsons Comics internationale" in issue #132, the Japanese supplement (Too crazy, Juvenile Prankster, BARTOMU! (serialized in "Laughing Laughing everyone is laughing")) opens as a parody of Dokaben, with Bartomu playing for the "Yokohama Li'l Ninjas", and an art style heavily based on Dokaben's highly recognized style of art.
