= Mac Divot =

American syndicated comic strip

- Author(s): Jordan Lanski and Mel Keefer
- Current status/schedule: Concluded
- Launch date: April 18, 1955
- End date: 1975
- Syndicate(s): Chicago Tribune Syndicate
- Genre: Sport

Mac Divot was an American syndicated comic strip written by Jordan Lanski and drawn by Mel Keefer, and distributed by Chicago Tribune Syndicate.

== History ==
The strip was originally called Links Driver, and debuted in Chicago Tribune on 18 April 1955. It features the realistic sport adventures of golf champion Sandy Mac Divot, which was modelled over golfer Gene Littler, who had been Lanski's real-life friend and schoolmate.

It ended in 1975 when Lanski left the comics industry to work in advertising. The strip has been published internationally in over 100 newspapers, including in Europe, Japan and Australia.

While golf seldom appeared in previous comic strips, Mac Divot is regarded as the first comic strip having golf as a main theme.
