= Robert van der Kroft =

Dutch cartoonist, musician and disc jockey

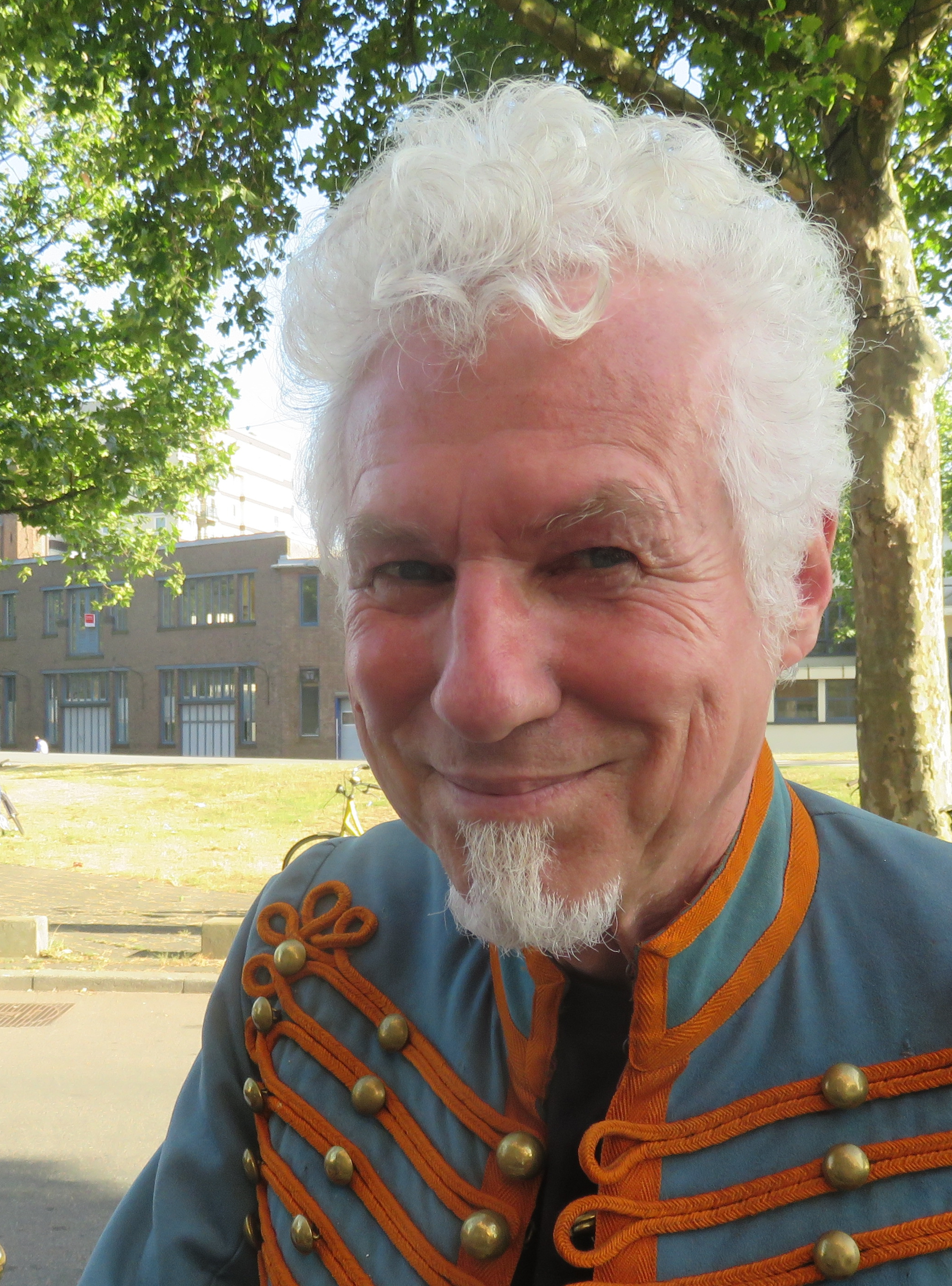
- Robert van der Kroft in Delfshaven, 2018
- Born: 1 April 1952 Haarlem
- Areas: Comics artist, musician, disc jockey
- Notable works: Sjors & Sjimmie; Claire
- Awards: Stripschapprijs, 1995

Robert van der Kroft (born Haarlem, 1 April 1952) is a Dutch comics artist, musician and disc jockey. He has been drawing the longstanding Sjors & Sjimmie comic strip since 1977, and Claire since 1988.

Beside his work for other comics and commercial work, he co-founded the Dutch comics magazines De Vrije Balloen in 1975 and Zone 5300 in 1994. More recently he has been promoting the Cross Comix Festival in Rotterdam since 2016.

== Biography ==
Van der Kroft was born and raised in Rotterdam as son of an advertising illustrator. From early on he was inspired by comics, particularly the works of Frans Piët, André Franquin, François Walthéry, Roy Crane and Hergé.

Van der Kroft started drawing at his high school newspaper. He got admitted to the Rotterdam Art Academy, where he only spent less than two months the first two years. After some freelance work he got a job at the weekly Donald Duck magazine from 1973 to 1977. There he drew covers, posters and comic scenes starring Disney characters such as Donald Duck and The Big Bad Wolf.

With the launch of the Eppo comics magazine in 1975 Van der Kroft came into prominence, when he was offered to draw the Sjors & Sjimmie comic. This comic had started by Frans Piët in 1938, and had been modernized with drawings by Jan Kruis and later Jan Steeman with writings by Martin Lodewijk.

A longstanding cooperation with Wilbert Plijnaar and Jan van Die started under the name the Wiroja's. They established a new clear line-approach for the Sjors en Sjimmie comic, which was published from 1975 to 2001. They also created the Claire comic series which ran from 1988 to 2017. In 1995 their cooperation was awarded the Stripschapprijs 1995 at the comic book convention in Breda for their successful resurrection of the Sjors & Sjimmie comic strip. Both Sjors & Sjimmie and Claire made comebacks in the quarterly magazine StripGlossy in 2019.

Over the years Van der Kroft did a lot of work for other comics and commercial work. In between he played the guitar in some bands, and more recently works as a DJ. In 1975 he was one of the founders of the Dutch comics magazine De Vrije Balloen, which was resolved in 1983. In 1994 he cofounded the Zone 5300 with Tonio van Vugt. More recently he has been promoting the Cross Comix Festival in Rotterdam since 2016.

== Works, a selection ==
=== Photo Gallery ===
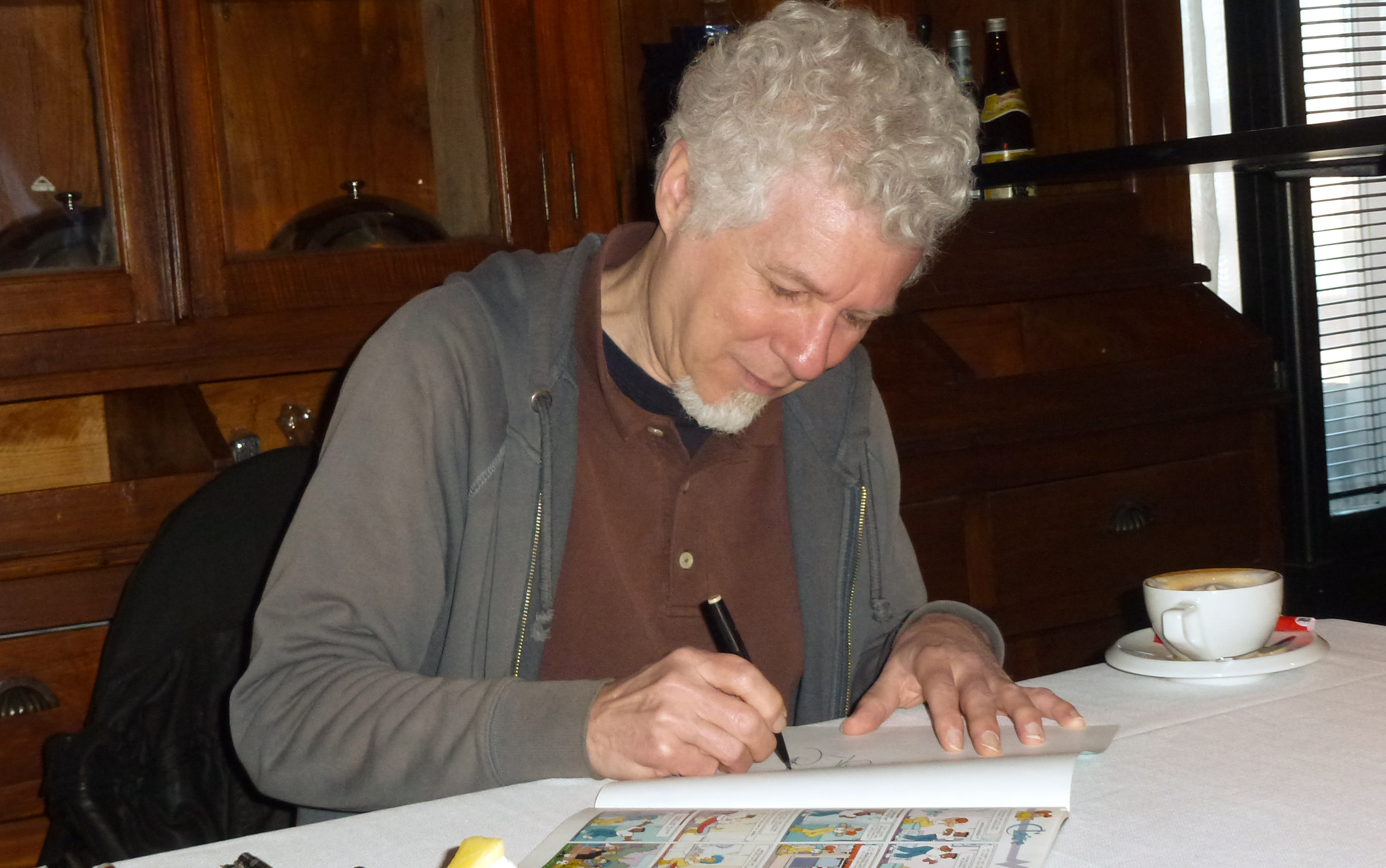
Signing work at the 10th comic convention Gouda, 2016

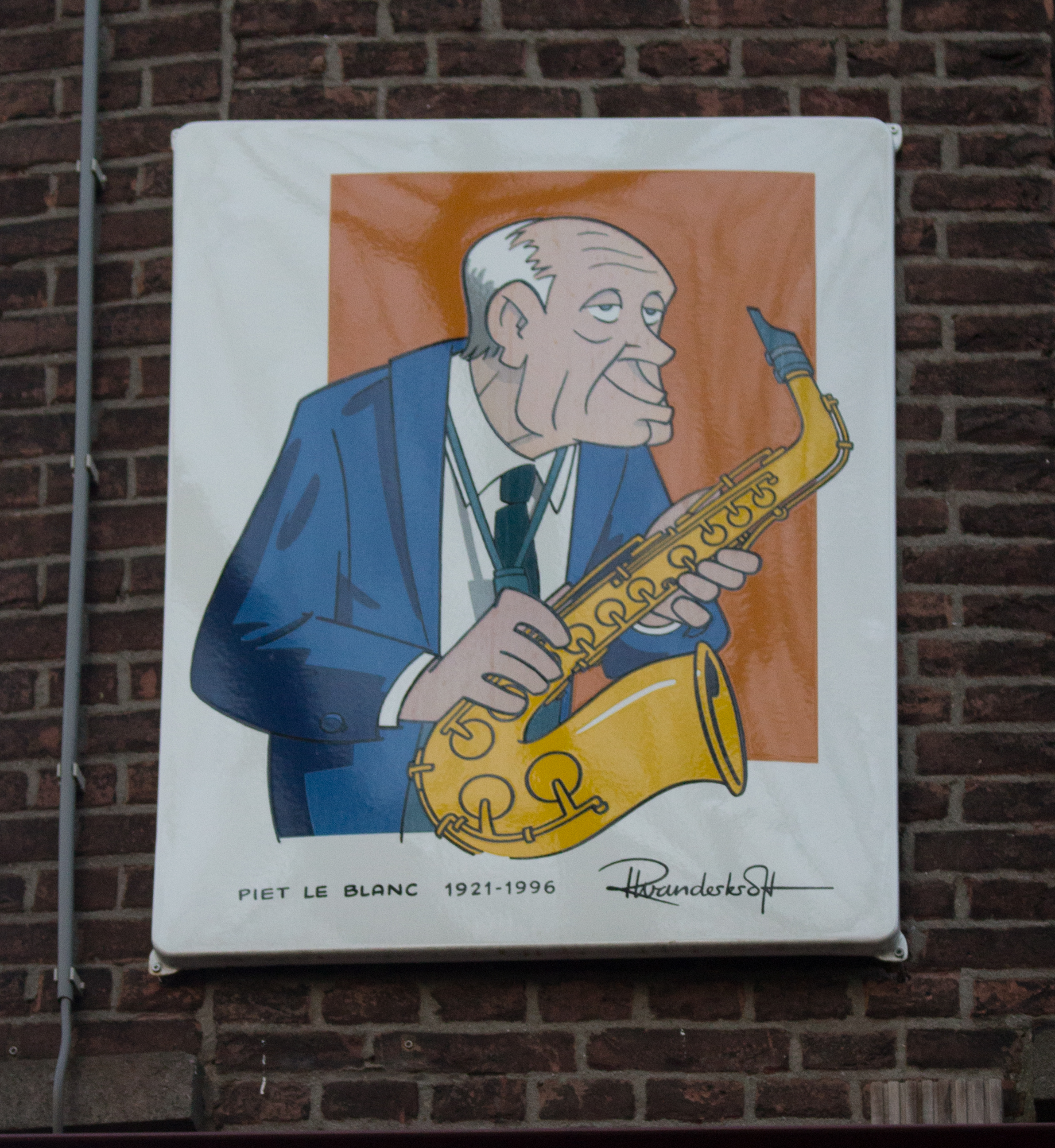
Jazzroute Piet le Blanc by Robert van der Kroft, 2016

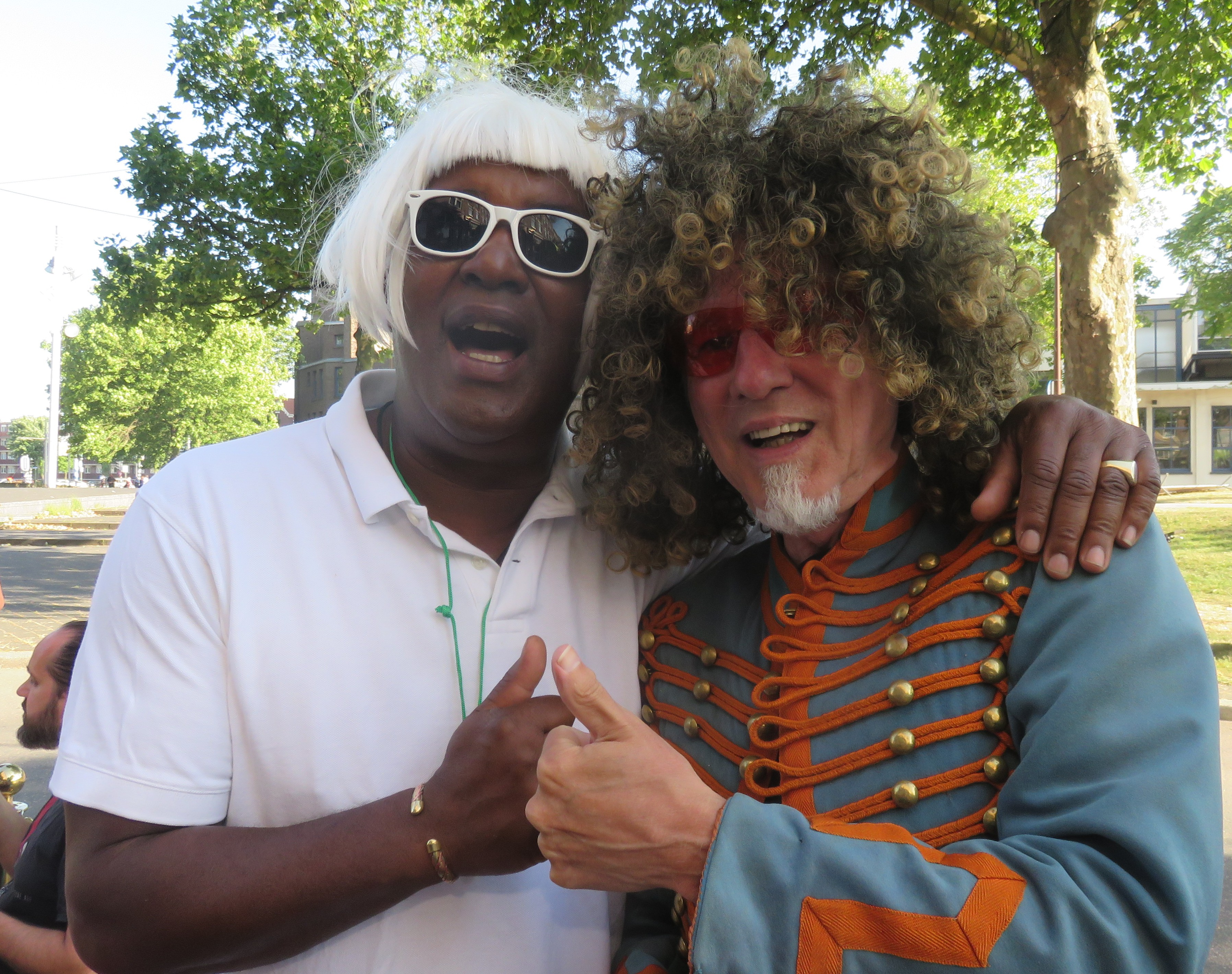
Sjors & Sjimmie disc jockey in Delfshaven, 2018
