= Karl the Viking =

British comic book story

- Karl the Viking in Lion, 8 December 1962. Art by Don Lawrence.

Character information
- First appearance: Lion (29 October 1960)

In-story information
- Species: Human
- Place of origin: Earth

Publication information
- Publisher: Fleetway Publications
- Schedule: Weekly
- Title(s): Lion; 29 October 1960 to 26 September 1964; Lion Annual; 1962-1966 and 1969
- Formats: Original material for the series has been published as a strip in the comics anthology(s) Lion.
- Genre: Historical fantasy
- Publication date: 29 October 1960 – 26 September 1964

Creative team
- Writer(s): Ted Cowan; Michael Moorcock
- Artist(s): Don Lawrence; Ted Drury; Robert Forrest; Ruggero Giovannini

Reprints
- Collected editions
- Karl the Viking - Volume I: The Sword of Eingar: ISBN 9781786184627
- Karl the Viking - Volume II: The Voyage of the Sea Raiders: ISBN 9781786187338

Karl the Viking is a British comic character, appearing in strips published by Fleetway Publications. Centred on a Saxon-born Viking warrior in the 11th century, the strip mixed historical adventure with fantasy, and first appeared in the boys' anthology title Lion on 29 October 1960. Drawn by Don Lawrence and written by Ted Cowan, the character's appearances ran for four years.

== Creation ==
Don Lawrence began work as a professional artist for Mick Anglo's Gower Street Studios in the 1950s, particularly on Marvelman Family, before falling out with Anglo over payments. He then pitched to Amalgamated Press, contributing odd strips to various titles before finding his niche on Tiger's "Olac the Gladiator", which established Lawrence as a historical action artist. He was tapped to provide a similar strip for Fleetway Publications' flagship boy's weekly Lion. Lion editor Bernard Smith paired him with the experienced writer Ted Cowan, who had created Robot Archie for the title in 1952 among numerous other works for AP and Fleetway. Ken Bulmer also worked with the pair to create the character.

== Publishing history ==
The strip debuted in the 29 October 1960 edition of Lion as "The Sword of Eingar" before being renamed "Karl the Viking" from the second serial onwards. It was a firm favourite, running for four years. For most of the run Lawrence and Cowan remained as the creative team, though Lawrence's schedule saw Ted Drury take over for three months in 1963. Cowan meanwhile would hand over the reins to future novelist Michael Moorcock for the final arc of the strip; he and Lawrence would work together to devise "Maroc the Mighty", which would replace "Karl the Viking" in Lion from October 1964. The character also appeared in Lion Annual stories; these gave Lawrence the opportunity to work in colour, and his painted art for the character was a major factor in his selection for "The Rise and Fall of the Trigan Empire" for Ranger.

"Karl the Viking" was twice reprinted by Fleetway and successor IPC Magazines. Audience research showed that readers typically only stayed with comics for three to five years while the low production quality of newsprint British weeklies meant issues were rarely saved or collected, and thus modified reprints were considered a valid cost-cutting exercise. The first such modified version of "Karl the Viking" came just two years after the original run ended, when the initial three arcs were reprinted as the adventures of Rolf the Viking under the title "Swords of the Sea Wolves" between 1 October 1966 and 7 October 1967 in Lion. The second came in 1969 as IPC attempted to salvage the failing Smash!, modified to "Erik the Viking" and printed between 3 May 1969 and 3 April 1971, ending when Smash! merged with Valiant. Both of these modified versions would generate a small amount of new material - a "Swords of the Sea Wolves" strip was created for the 1968 Lion Annual, while a text story featuring Erik the Viking featured in the 1971 Valiant Annual.

As Lawrence's reputation grew on the back of his work issues of Lion featuring Karl the Viking became sought-after collector's items. In 2008, British comics expert Steve Holland worked with the Netherlands-based Don Lawrence Collection to compile the complete series into four hardback collections, available either individually or as a boxed set with a slipcase. In 2018 "Karl the Viking" was among the IPC-owned properties acquired by 2000 AD publisher Rebellion Developments, and in 2020 they released the complete "Karl the Viking" strips across two volumes in their Treasury of British Comics series.

== Plot summary ==
Viking warlord Eingar the Manslayer leads a brutal raid on a Saxon fishing village. Most of the Saxons meekly surrender apart from one man, who holds several Vikings at bay before being killed by Eingar. Impressed by his courage, Eingar orders the man's child be spared from the slaughter and takes him back home. Naming him Karl, he raises the boy as his own, resulting in a formidable warrior who combines the best of both Viking and Saxon.

Karl joins his adoptive father on raids but they are cursed by a crone after disturbing the grave of a Celtic king. On the return voyage the long ships are caught in a storm that drives sinks many and drives the rest into an ambush by Picts. Karl is captured and believed dead but returns home on a raft, only to find Eingar's ship arrived containing only one dying man. While Karl was designated heir, Eingar's half-brother Orlaf contests him leading the group due to his Saxon blood, instead suggesting his own son Skurl. To settle the issue a village elder suggests both parties search for Eingar's sword, with the winner being elected chief. Skurl subsequently betrayed Karl, leaving him for dead at sea, but he survived and found the sword had come into the possession of the cruel Saxon noble Earl Gyrth. Karl was able to recover the sword, killing Gyrth and avenging his father and also eliminating Skurl, before being proclaimed chieftain.

In command, Karl tempered the Vikings with compassion. As such, he led an expedition to return Mesoamerican boy-king Tihuana home safely and found plunder by tracking the treasure of Woden. During the latter he crossed swords with the bestial Selgor, who then impersonated Thor in an unsuccessful attempt to turn the clan against Karl.

Further threats included an airborne fungus possessed by the spirit Helvud; Saracen hypnotist El Sarid; Gefion One-Eye and his savage Skeld Vikings, who mounted a challenge to Karl's leadership as they both fought the Kraken; evil Moru the Sorcerer and his army, led by Elrik the Black; Arabian tribe leader Talga and numerous foes as the Vikings returned overland; an African tribe led by the cruel Tava; and a brutal rival Flamebeard.

== Collected editions ==
| Title | ISBN | Publisher | Release date | Contents |
|---|---|---|---|---|
| Karl the Viking Vol. 1 - The Sword of Eingar | 9789088860324 | The Don Lawrence Collection | October 2008 | |
| Karl the Viking Vol. 2 - The Powers of Hevlund | 9789088860348 | The Don Lawrence Collection | October 2008 | |
| Karl the Viking Vol. 3 - Island of Monsters | 9789088860362 | The Don Lawrence Collection | October 2008 | |
| Karl the Viking Vol. 4 - Quest of the Long Ships | 9789088860386 | The Don Lawrence Collection | October 2008 | |
| Karl the Viking - Volume I: The Sword of Eingar | 9781786184627 | Rebellion Developments | 20 January 2020 | Material from Lion 29 October 1960 to 1 December 1962 |
| Karl the Viking - Volume II: The Voyage of the Sea Raiders | 9781786187338 | Rebellion Developments | 22 December 2020 | Material from Lion 1 December 1962 to 29 September 1964 and Lion Annual 1963-66 & 1969. |

== Reception ==
In an essay commissioned by Rebellion to celebrate the first Treasury of British Comics release, Doris V. Sutherland praised the series for its lavish artwork and imaginative world, a "carefree mash-up of different eras". Despite reservations about some of the dialogue, Karl Verhoven praised the collection for Slings & Arrows, feeling it charted Lawrence's development as an artist and that the "plots pack a lot in as they twist and turn".
