= Don Lawrence =

British comic book artist and author

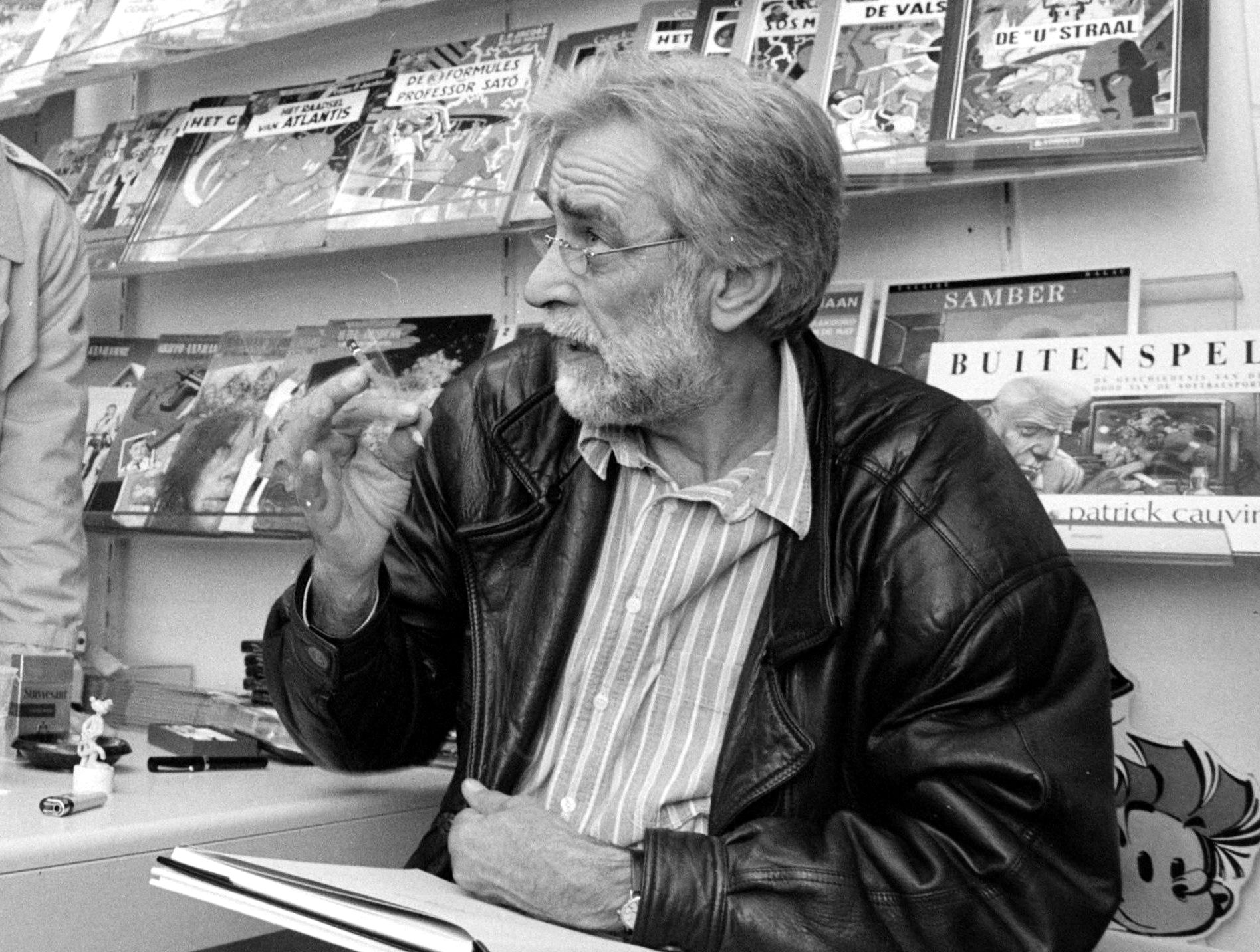
- Don Lawrence, 1990.
- Born: Donald Southam Lawrence; 17 November 1928 London, England
- Died: 29 December 2003 (aged 75) Jevington, England
- Areas: Writer, Artist
- Notable works: The Rise and Fall of the Trigan Empire; Storm

Donald Southam Lawrence (17 November 1928 – 29 December 2003) was a British comic book artist and author.

Lawrence is best known for his comic strips The Rise and Fall of the Trigan Empire in the British weeklies Ranger and Look and Learn, and the Storm series, first published in the Dutch weekly Eppo (later relaunched as Sjors & Sjimmie) and subsequently in album form. Famous for his realistic and detailed style, he was an inspiration for later UK comic-book artists such as Brian Bolland, Dave Gibbons and Chris Weston (indeed, Weston was taught by Lawrence), and influenced Indonesian artist Apri Kusbiantoro.

== Early life ==
Born in East Sheen, a suburb of London, Lawrence was educated at St. Paul's School, Hammersmith. After joining the Army for his National Service, Lawrence used his gratuity to study art at Borough Polytechnic Institute (now the London South Bank University) but failed his final exams. Shortly before, a former student had visited the school to show students the work he was doing as a letterer on comic strips. Lawrence was inspired to take some samples to an editor at Amalgamated Press who suggested he try showing them to Mick Anglo, who ran a studio packaging comic strips for a London publisher and magazine distributor, Len Miller.

== Career ==
Lawrence worked for Anglo for four years, drawing the adventures of superhero Marvelman and various Western comic strips. After an argument with Anglo over pay rates, he found work with Odhams Press, drawing Wells Fargo for Zip, and with the Amalgamated Press (now renamed Fleetway Publications), contributing episodes of Billy the Kid to the comic Sun. When the ailing Sun merged with Lion, Lawrence switched to swashbuckling historical strips, Olac the Gladiator, Karl the Viking and Maroc the Mighty (written by Michael Moorcock).

A colour strip produced for Lion Annual 1965 (Karl the Viking and the Tideless Sea) led to Lawrence being offered colour work in Bible Story magazine and the sprawling science fantasy The Rise and Fall of the Trigan Empire which debuted in Ranger in 1965. Lawrence was to draw the strip in the pages of Ranger and Look and Learn until 1976.

In 1976 Lawrence attended the London comic book convention called Comics 101, the first convention dedicated to British comic book creators. There he learned that The Trigan Empire was syndicated all over Europe. When his publisher refused to give him any form of royalties or compensation, he departed from his old employer and was immediately offered work on a new Dutch comic magazine called Eppo. After an abortive start on a strip entitled Commander Grek written by his friend Vince Wernham, Lawrence found success with Storm. The first volume, The Deep World, was based on a concept by Martin Lodewijk but written by Philip Dunn. A further 22 volumes followed.

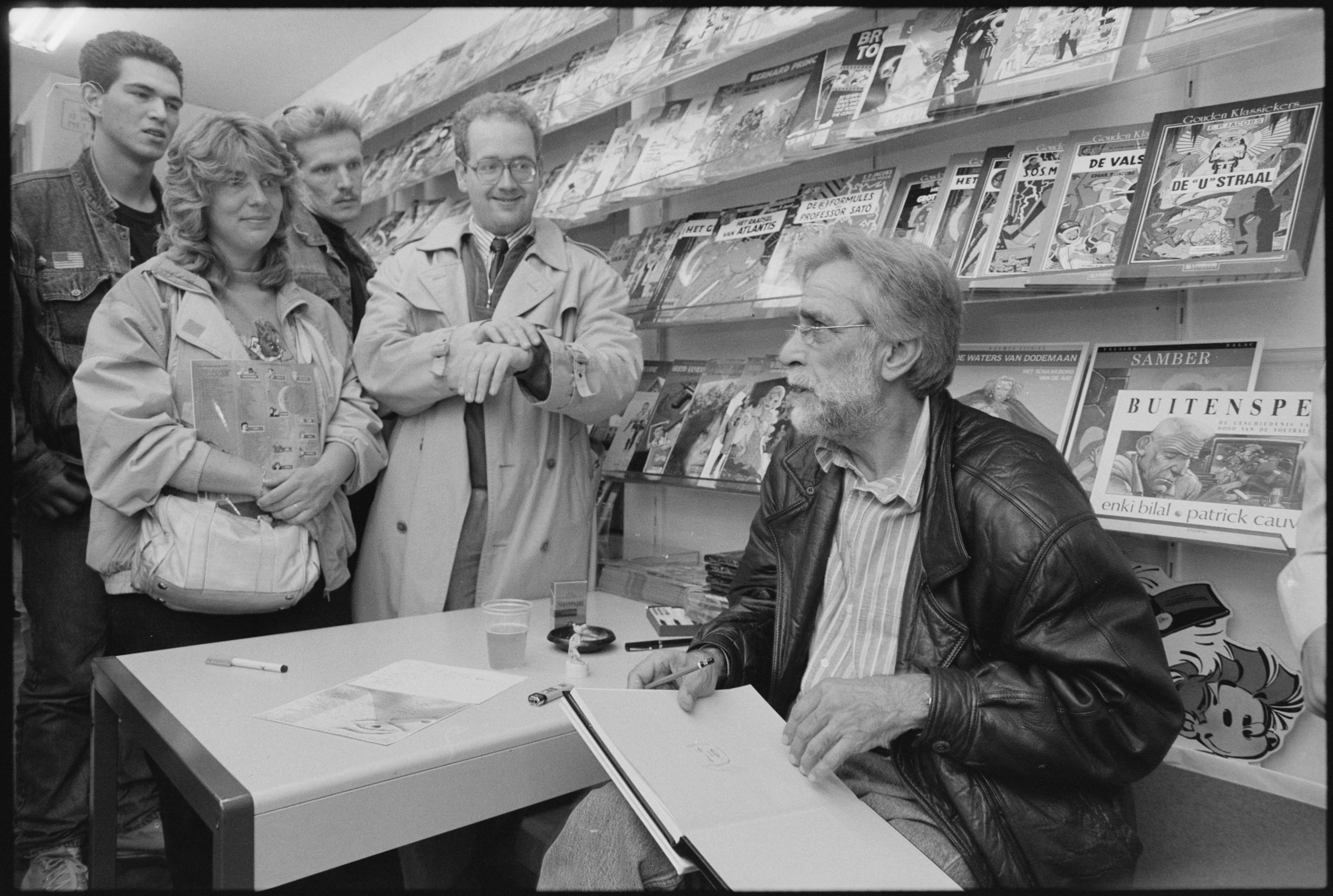
Signing session in Haarlem, 1990

Lawrence did not limit himself solely to Trigan Empire and Storm; other strips he drew include Fireball XL5 and The Adventures of Tarzan for TV Century 21, Carrie for the men's magazine Mayfair and a number of one-off strips for various Dutch publishers.

A number of partly completed and unpublished comic strips appeared in the series Don Lawrence Collection, published in the Netherlands. The final Storm serial (completed by Lawrence's former assistant Liam Sharp) appeared in the magazine Pandarve published by the Don Lawrence Fanclub in 1999–2001. One of his last illustrations was the cover of volume 6 of the Storm -the collection- from 2002.

In the mid-1980s he was looking for an assistant and accepted then 17-years old Liam Sharp as his apprentice, but after realizing he did not want to step back as much as he had thought he would, he helped Sharp develop his own style.

== Later life ==
In 1995, he lost sight of his right eye, caused by an infection after an unsuccessful cataract operation. With his depth perception gone, he could no longer see when the tip of his pen and brush touched the paper's surface, forcing him to teach himself an alternative drawing technique.

He went through a new cataract operation in 1999, this time without medical complications. But his general health was starting to decline, and when he was diagnosed with emphysema and put on medication, he permanently retired from comics and art.

Lawrence died in December 2003 of emphysema at the age of 75.

== Awards ==
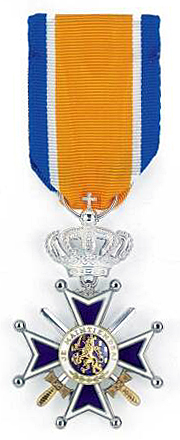
Medal of the Knight of the Order of Orange-Nassau

- 1976 The IPC Magazines Award for the Best Adventure Comic Artist of 1975
- 1980 Society of Illustration Lifetime Achievement Award
- 1981 Grand Prix Spatial
- 1987 Gouden Bommel Award
- 1994 De Stripschapprijs
- 1998 Pantera di Lucca Lifetime Achievement Award
- 2003 Knight of the Order of Orange-Nassau

== Bibliography ==
Comics work published in English include:

- The Look and Learn Book of the Trigan Empire (1973)
- The Trigan Empire (1978)
- Storm: The Deep World (1982)
- Storm: The Last Fighter (1987)
- Storm: The Pirates of Pandarve (1989)
- Tales From the Trigan Empire (1989)
- Cathy (1991) — reprints Carrie
- Don Lawrence Collected (2001)
- Storm The Collection Volume 1 (May 2004 ISBN 978-90-73508-52-1)
- Storm The Collection Volume 2 (May 2004 ISBN 978-90-73508-49-1)
- The Trigan Empire: The Prisoner of Zerss (August 2004 ISBN 978-90-73508-54-5)
- Storm The Collection Volume 3 (September 2004 ISBN 978-90-73508-57-6)
- Don Lawrence: The Legacy Book 1 — Storm (October 2004)
- The Trigan Empire: The Sun-Worshippers (February 2005 ISBN 978-90-73508-62-0)
- The Trigan Empire: The House of the Five Moons (June 2005 ISBN 978-90-73508-64-4)
- Storm The Collection Volume 4 (June 2005 ISBN 978-90-73508-68-2)
- The Trigan Empire: The Curse of King Yutta (December 2005 ISBN 978-90-73508-66-8)
- Storm The Collection Volume 5 (February 2006 ISBN 978-90-73508-77-4)
- The Trigan Empire: The Three Princes (May 2006 ISBN 978-90-73508-78-1)
- Don Lawrence: The Legacy Book 2 — Women (June 2006)
- The Trigan Empire: The Rallu Invasion (August 2006 ISBN 978-90-73508-82-8)
- Pandarve: The Worlds of Don Lawrence (September 2006)
- The Trigan Empire: The Reign of Thara (November 2006 ISBN 978-90-73508-84-2)
- The Trigan Empire: Revolution in Zabriz (March 2007 ISBN 978-90-73508-91-0)
- Storm The Collection Volume 6 (April 2007 ISBN 978-90-73508-81-1)
- Storm The Collection Volume 7 (April 2007 ISBN 978-90-73508-97-2)
- The Trigan Empire: The Puppet Emperor (November 2007 ISBN 978-90-73508-93-4)
- Karl the Viking (October 2008) (also released as a box-set containing all four volumes):
  - Volume 1: The Sword of Eingar (ISBN 978-9088860-32-4)
  - Volume 2: The Powers of Helvud (ISBN 978-9088860-34-8)
  - Volume 3: Island of the Monsters (ISBN 978-9088860-36-2)
  - Volume 4: Quest of the Long Ships (ISBN 978-9088860-38-6)
- Storm The Collection Volume 8 (October 2008 ISBN 978-90-73508-99-6)
- Storm The Collection Volume 9 (October 2008 ISBN 978-90-8886-023-2)
- The Trigan Empire: The Invaders From Gallas (forthcoming 2009)
- The Trigan Empire: The Green Smog (forthcoming 2009)
