= Franka =

Dutch comic book series

Character information
- First appearance: Pep ([[ in comics|]])

In-story information
- Species: Human
- Place of origin: fictional Netherlands

Publication information
- Formats: Comics album
- Original language: Dutch
- Genre: see below

Creative team
- Writer(s): Henk Kuijpers
- Artist(s): Henk Kuijpers

Franka sighting the ghost ship 'Northern Sun' in De Terugkeer van de Noorderzon, one of the early volumes

Franka is a popular Dutch comic book series, drawn and written since the mid-1970s by the graphic artist, Henk Kuijpers. The principal character is a strong female Dutch sleuth who solves mysteries in exotic locales.

Franka has been translated into a variety of languages, including Danish, German, French and Spanish.

== Principal character ==
Franka (Francesca Victoria), the title character, is a young, attractive and adventurous female private investigator. She lives in a slightly fictionalised version of the Netherlands, and since 1993's Flight of the Atlantis, has clearly been revealed as a resident of Amsterdam (before, she lived in the fictional 'Groterdam'). The cases she solves often take place in the worlds of art, antiquities, fashion and film, and also often feature exotic locales full of smugglers, pirates and other shady businessmen.

Dominant women are a recurring theme of the series, similar to Franco-Belgian comics series such as Yoko Tsuno. A single woman for long time, Franka acquired a male partner and love interest in the later volumes, the reformed art thief Rix. More often than not she is also accompanied by her dog Bars.

Franka was not the main character in the very first adventure of the series (an eight-page story which makes up the first part of Volume #1, Het Misdaadmuseum). Instead, Jarko (who is an increasingly minor character in all later volumes) played the central role, and Franka is only a secretary in the Criminology Museum. However, by the second (main) story of the first volume, Franka has become a central character, though not yet as exclusively so as in the later volumes.

== Drawing style ==
Franka is an example of the ligne claire style frequently associated with bande desinée comics, and Kuijpers' drawing style is noted for its high artistic standards, particularly clarity of line and accurate detail of elements like cars and buildings. The panels often contain additional little interesting or humorous details not relevant to the main storyline.

The drawing style has developed significantly from the early comics, in which for example the characters had large eyes and squat proportions, to the more realistic figure drawing of the middle volumes to the slightly more stylized, 'fashion-designer' look of the latest issues. Also changed were the visual depiction of females - the Franka of the later volumes is a much more sexual creature than in the early volumes, where she only had friends, but never partners. While the early volumes rarely show nakedness, all volumes play with erotic poses and later volumes show Franka and other characters naked. Sexual acts, however, are generally only hinted at, though, again, this becomes more explicit in the later volumes.

== Publications ==
=== Publication history ===
Franka originally appeared in the weekly comic magazine Pep which, in 1975, merged with Sjors into Eppo. Franka became one of the magazine's fixtures for the next eleven years (1984 being her one sabbatical-year). In 1988, Eppo became Sjors & Sjimmie but it took another year before Franka made her comeback. In 1992, she returned to annual appearances starting at the beginning of the year. After Sjors & Sjimmie (or Sjosji as it was known since 1994) ceased publication in 1999 Franka went on to become the subject of her own online magazine. In February 2009, Eppo was revived as a forthnightly magazine appealing to original readers as well as their offspring; Franka is one of several household names to be included. In January 2010, she was voted Dutch comic strip heroine of all time.

From the 1990s onwards, Franka was also serialised in Veronica Magazine, the magazine of Veronica TV, which with weekly sales of over 1,000,000 was among the most widely circulated Dutch periodicals.

Franka has also been published in German, Spanish, Catalan, Galician, Scandinavian languages, as well as in French (Spirou).

Incidents from previous volumes are often referred to in the subsequent ones, although they can be read independently.

=== Albums in the official series ===
The following are the Dutch language editions. From volume 1 to volume 8 the publisher was Oberon, from volume 9 to 15, Big Balloon, and from volume 16 Franka BV.

1. Het Misdaadmuseum (Criminology Museum) (1978)

2. Het Meesterwerk (The Masterpiece) (1978)

3. De Terugkeer van de Noorderzon (The Return of the Noorderzon) (1978)

4. De Wraak van het Vrachtschip (The Revenge of the Freighter) (1979)

- De Terugkeer van de Noorderzon and De Wraak van het Vrachtschip together form one episode.

5. Circus Santekraam (1981) (includes the episode Animal Day).

6. Het Monster van de Moerplaat (The Swamp Monster) (1982)

- also includes the episodes Pyromaniac and Saboteur.

7. De Tanden van de Draak (The Dragon's Teeth) (1984)

8. De Ondergang van de Donderdraak (The Dragon's Downfall) (1986)

- De Tanden van de Draak and De Ondergang van de Donderdraak together form one episode.

9. Moordende Concurrentie (Murderous Competition) (1990)

10. Gangsterfilm (Gangster Movie) (1992)

11. De Vlucht van de Atlantis (Flight of the Atlantis) (1993)

12. De Blauwe Venus (The Blue Venus) (1994)

13. De Dertiende Letter (The Thirteenth Letter) (1995)

14. Het Portugese Goudschip (The Portuguese Gold Ship) (1996)

15. De Ogen van de Roerganger (The Eyes of the Oarsman) (1997)

- Het Portugese Goudschip and De Ogen van de Roerganger together form one episode.

16. Succes Verzekerd (Success Guaranteed) (1999)

17. Eigen risico (At Your Own Risk) (2001)

- Succes Verzekerd and Eigen Risico together form one episode.

18. Kidnap (2004)

19. Het zwaard van Iskander (The Sword of Iskander) (2006)

20. De Witte Godin (The White Goddess) (2009)

21. Het Zilveren Vuur (The Silver Fire) (2010)

- Het zwaard van Iskander, De Witte Godin and Het Zilveren Vuur together form the trilogy De reis van de Ishtar (The Journey of Ishtar)

22. Onderwereld (Underworld) (2012)

23. Geheim 1948 (Secret 1948) (2016)

24. Operatie Roofmoord (Operation Robbery and Murder) (2019)

=== Albums not in the main series ===
- The Cadillac Club (1988)
- Harley Collection (1998)
- Kerstkaarten, Overschakelen and Aquarellen (2000)
  - These three volumes ("Christmas Cards", "Dust Jackets" and "Watercolours") appeared in the "kill them pirates" edition produced by Franka BV as a reaction to pirated publications of Franka items after a quantity of Kuijpers' drawings had been stolen.
- Felle Flitsen (2002), specially produced for strip cartoon week by the publishing house Silvester of 's-Hertogenbosch.
- Het geheim van de archiefkast ("The Secret of the Muniment Chest") (1989)
- Het halssnoer (The Noose) (date of publication unknown) - early version of Moordende Concurrentie.
- Technicolor Widescreen (1990)

== Trivia ==
- Exponents of Amsterdam's public transport company (trams in particular) make regular cameo-appearances.
- In 1985 Eppo placed an April Fool's joke suggesting that Steven Spielberg would turn Dragon's Teeth into a Hollywood blockbuster movie.
- The same year, shortly before the publishing of Dragon's Fall, a fake advert emerged telling Franka was busy removing every forged Chinese antiquity in existence.
- Work on Murderous Competition already started before Dragon's Teeth; it took seven years to complete before it was serialised late 1989 in the forthnightly Sjors & Sjimmie. The Saboteur (1979/1981) was republished as a prequel to introduce Laura Lava to the younger readers.
- In issue 22/2009 of Eppo Franka is lined up in an identity parade of possible offenders who brutally robbed the young girl Elsje (from another comic series) of her copy of Eppo. Other suspects include Agent 327 and Leonard.
