= Tita Tovenaar =

Tita Tovenaar or TiTa Tovenaar (translation: Tita the wizard) is a Dutch children's television series, which was produced by the Nederlandse Omroep Stichting and ran between 1972 and 1974. At the time it was popular enough to inspire audio plays and a comic strip. Tita Tovenaar remained popular in repeats and was adapted into a 2005 stage musical. Between 2008 and 2009 it briefly returned to Dutch TV screens in a new version.

== 1972-1974 version ==
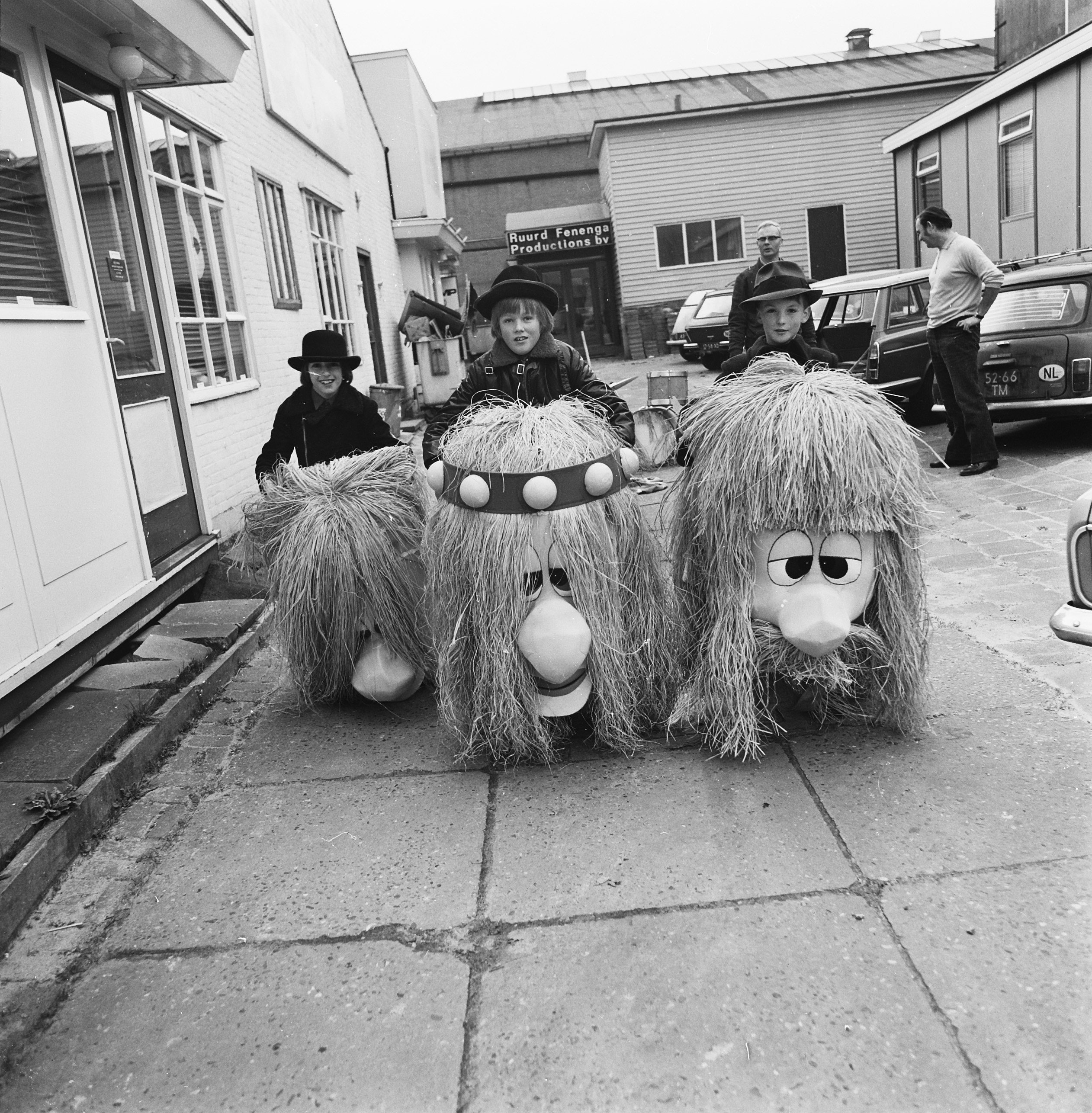
In 1974 the props and puppets were auctioned, including the Grob and Grol Band here

Tita Tovenaar is set in a castle in the clouds, where Tita the absent-minded wizard lives with his daughter Tika. She learns how to conduct magic, but her spells often have a different outcome since her father is so absent-minded. Other characters are Tato the magic monkey and the Grobbevogel bird, whose eggs create monstrous birds who terrorize Earth. Many episodes revolve around their magic endeavours and the effect they have on the people on Earth.

In the second season new characters like Kwark the sorcerer's apprentice and Grobelia the witch and her mother Grobbema made their entry.

The series was written by Lo Hartog van Banda and the songs by Joop Stokkermans.

== Cast ==
- Ton Lensink: Tita Tovenaar.
- Maroesja Lacunes: Tika.
- Tim Beekman: Frederik.
- Riet Wieland Los: Amalia, Miepje Hazelaar
- Marlies van Alcmaer: Petronella.
- Maélys Morel: Grobelia.
- Mela Soesman: Grobbema.
- Teja Vossen: Grobbekuiken.

== Success and merchandising ==
Tita Tovenaar was quite popular at the time. It inspired novelisations, audio play records, songs, dolls, magic lanterns and a comic strip drawn by Frans Piët, the creator of Sjors en Sjimmie. To this day the series is often repeated on Dutch public television.

== Revival in the 2000s ==
In 2005 the series was adapted into a musical, produced by the Dutch theme park De Efteling and its theater Efteling Theater. None of the original actors returned: instead new actors were cast: Erik Brey (Tita), Manon Novak (Tika), Anne-Mieke Ruyten (Grobelia), Rop Verheijen (Kwark), Jette van der Meij (Grobbema), Sander Jan Klerk (Tom de Tuinman), Harry Slinger (Opa Tovenaar), Dieter Jansen (Grobbebol Geeltje) en Thijs van Aken (Grobbebol Broer). This musical version also became the basis of the 2008-2009 TV reboot.
