= Michael Butterworth =

Michael Butterworth may refer to:

- Michael Butterworth (author) (born 1947), British author and publisher
- Mike Butterworth (1924–1986), British comic book writer
