= Het Misdaadmuseum =

Comic by Henk Kuijpers

Het Misdaadmuseum (The Criminology Museum) is a Dutch comic by Henk Kuijpers published in 1978. It was previously serialised in comic weekly Pep in 1974. One of the supporting-characters, Franka, went on to become the protagonist of the eponymously-titled comic.

== Storyline ==
The opening sequence chronicles a burglary and the prosecution of the offenders. The pieces of evidence are handed over to the Criminology Museum (a group of crime-experts who are not criminals), just at that moment, a job applicant (the bearded Jarko Jansen) arrives. He meets the staff (Franka in particular) and gets the job. Jarko solves his first case in cooperation with Officer Noordenwind by subjecting the victim to a lie-test, using the number of scratches in a vinyl record.

Back at work, the Museum receives a visit from Oscar Buhne, who wants to discuss the script for a crime-movie. Franka, who works as a secretary, asks if anyone fancies a cup of coffee and notes that Professor Philip Factotum has got a visitor. While Jarko checks the script, Franka goes round to have a talk with Frikko Falegier, who wants to sell a crossbow once used to kill Robin Hood. Put off by his rude behaviour, she takes the bow with her, but on her way back to the car, she is approached by the professor's visitor. Without recognising her, he asks for the address of the building that Franka just came out of; she misleads him by sending him round the block, and returns to the shop where she hides in what appears to be a secret elevator. The man arrives and takes the elevator to a hidden basement where he orders a war-plane by computer. The door closes upon his exit, leaving Franka stranded and stuck in a harness.

Oscar Buhne returns to the Criminology Museum to collect the revised script. Back at his hotel room, he transforms into the man who ordered the war-plane. He uses Jarko's script to stage a burglary at the Royal Printers, which produces the droppollo, the currency of the fictional Republic of Oceanaqua. He prints a suitcase full of money to finance the plane but betrayed him, and upon his arrival at the hotel he is caught.

When Jarko reads his own script in the morning paper, he wants to resign. Meanwhile, Franka manages to escape by pretending to be a harness that fell down. Back at work, the officer, Jarko, Franka and Professor Factotum exchange recent experiences, and thanks to the latter, they learn that the offender is Argos Attak, a man who borrowed books about escape from deportation. At that moment, he cuts short his trip to the police station by using a sleeping gas-filled smoke-bomb that was inside his shoe. Everyone chases him, but Jarko, Franka and Bars (the officer's dog) are exposed to a second bomb.

When Jarko regains conscientiousness, they find themselves inside the war-plane flying to Oceanaqua. Franka already knows the situation, that the Pefirio Orca movement managed to own the one military battle-ship at the republic. Once more, Argos explains that he stole the money and bought the plane to start a revolution to liberate Oceanaqua from the oppressor who recently gained power.

The revolution takes place, the man who sold the plane is sent to prison, and Jarko and Franka have themselves a holiday.

== Cast ==
Characters in order of appearance.

- Jarko Jansen: the Museum's new recruit
- Philip Factotum: looks after the Museum's library
- Franka: secretary
- Officer Noordenwind: director
- Bars: the officer's bulldog
- Mr. Pafferink: the offender from Jarko's first case
- Jan Hars: got framed by Mr. Pafferink for theft
- Argos Attak/Oscar Buhne: wanted to start a revolution on Oceanaqua
- Otto Schmidt (AKA Messerschmidt): delivered the war-plane
- Andries Libbel: police officer in Luttel
- Ol Admirol: oppressor at Oceanaqua and leader of Perfirio Orca
- Emilio: Argos' garage-owning mate
- Manos: Emilio's less than handsome employee

Organisations involved:

- Cash & Kill: delivers military planes
- Perfirio Orca: the leading movement on Oceanaqua

== Locations ==
- Groterdam
- Luttel
- Oceanaqua
