= Noortje =

- Author(s): Jan Steeman, Patty Klein, Lucas Steeman
- Launch date: September 12, 1975
- Genre(s): Humor comics, Gag-a-day comics

Noortje (full name Noortje Visser) is a Dutch gag-a-day humor comic strip created in 1975 for the Dutch girls' magazine Tina. The script is by Patty Klein and the drawings are by Jan Steeman. It is currently one of the longest-running Dutch comics series and with 41 years the longest-running Dutch comics series made by the same writer/artist team. In 2016 Steeman resigned and was succeeded by his son Lucas Steeman; he died on January 24, 2018, of kidney-failure. Patty Klein died on 15 March 2019.

== Concept ==
Noortje stars a young, red-haired teenage girl with freckles. Each episode is a self-contained story in which she usually makes a huge blunder or ends up in an embarrassing situation.

== Characters ==
- Noortje Visser: A young girl who is very clumsy and a bit naïve. She has a love for animals, but suffers from arachnaphobia and dislikes cleaning up her room. She is often late for school. Originally the character was about 12 or 13 years old, but she is nowadays around 16.
- Sander: Her brother, whom she feels annoyed with.
- Marlies: Noortje's best friend.

== Albums ==
The first nine albums were published by De Geïllustreerde Pers, the following five by VNU Tijdschriften. Since 2002 all albums are published by Sanoma.

1. Kan die muziek zachter? (1994)
2. Streng verboden te lezen! (1995)
3. Hij houdt van me... Hij houdt niet van me... (1995)
4. Béregezellig! (1996)
5. Duizend keer lachen (1996)
6. Noortje kookt over (1996)
7. Altijd uitgelaten (1997)
8. Een pláátje (1997)
9. Versiert het weer (1997)
10. Blundert voor tien (1998)
11. Gaat mobiel (1999)
12. ...En niemand anders! (2000)
13. In beeld (2000)
14. Altijd opgeruimd (2001)
15. Zet ‘m op! (2002)
16. Spettert (2003)
17. Steelt de show (2004)
18. Ziet ze vliegen (2005)
19. Mooi is dat! (2006)
20. Laat van zich horen (2007)
21. Om te zoenen (2008)
22. In volle vaart (2009)
23. Stapelgek! (2010)
24. Het beste van (2011)
25. Bakt ze bruin! (2012)
26. Maakt het mooier (2013)
27. Om te aaien (2014)
28. Lang zal ze leven! (2015)
