= Storm (Don Lawrence) =

Comic book series

- Painting by Don Lawrence of Storm and Ember.

Publication information
- Publisher: Original publisher: Oberon; Full list
- Publication date: 1977 – present
- No. of issues: 25 (28 including spin-offs)
- Main character(s): Storm; Roodhaar/Redhair/Carrots/Ember; Nomad; Marduk

Creative team
- Written by: Martin Lodewijk; Dick Matena; Kelvin Gosnell; Philip "Saul" Dunn; Don Lawrence; Vince Wernham
- Artist(s): Don Lawrence; Dick Matena; Romano Molenaar; Apri Kusbiantoro; Jorge de Vos; Minck Oosterveer

Storm is a science fiction / fantasy comic book series originally (and for most albums) drawn by Don Lawrence. It tells the adventures of an astronaut who accidentally gets lost in time. The series originated in Dutch, but has since been translated into many other languages.

== Publication history ==
Don Lawrence had spent ten years as the artist behind the British science-fiction strip The Trigan Empire. With its impressive visuals, melodramatic plots, and (unusual for the time) fully-painted art, the strip developed a considerable fanbase in continental markets, particularly in the Netherlands. After Lawrence was replaced in 1976, Martin Lodewijk and Frits van der Heide, who had been publishing a Dutch-language version of The Trigan Empire in the comics magazine Eppo, approached Lawrence and suggested he create an original story for them. Lawrence initially conceived of a story set in the "Deep World," a future Earth in which the oceans have receded and primitive civilizations exist on the former sea-beds. The title revolved around a character named "Commander Grek", but the first installment (written in 1976 by Vince Wernham) was not picked up by Dutch publisher Oberon. The story was later reworked by Philip "Saul" Dunn, with Grek replaced as the main character by the time-displaced 21st-century astronaut Storm. This version did get published by Oberon, serialized in Eppo in 1977, with the "Deep World" setting reused for the first nine volumes of the series. (In 1984, with the Storm series an established success, the previously unreleased Commander Grek album was published as "Episode 0" of the series, with background information regarding the inception of the project.)

Storm originated in Dutch, although all the books have been translated into English and German, and some in at least twelve other languages (publishers in those languages include Oberon, Interpresse, Quality Communications, Glénat, and Norma Editorial). English translations have been published as part of the Don Lawrence Collection. The Living Planet and The Slayer of Eriban were also published in Heavy Metal magazine in January 1997 and March 1999, while The Navel of the Double God (2007) had an early publication in the Dutch magazine Myx.

== Characters ==
- Storm: an astronaut who is accidentally displaced in time
- Roodhaar (also known as Redhair, Carrots or Ember): a beautiful red-head, an inhabitant of the future Earth
- Nomad: a hairless red-skinned muscle man; makes first appearance in The Chronicles of Pandarve (1983)
- Marduk, the Theocrat of Pandarve: makes first appearance in The Chronicles of Pandarve (1983)

== Overview ==
The series consists of two distinct parts: The Chronicles of the Deep World, which takes place on a post-apocalyptic Earth, and The Chronicles of Pandarve, which takes place in the Pandarve multiverse.

=== The Chronicles of the Deep World ===
Storm is an astronaut in the 21st century who makes a journey to investigate the Great Red Spot of Jupiter. The Great Red Spot is an anticyclonic storm which has already been there for at least 300 years. Once arrived, his ship gets dragged into the storm. While Storm manages to escape and return to Earth, he finds that he has traveled through time. The oceans have vanished, civilization on Earth has collapsed, and barbaric societies exist on the former abyssal plain.

Apart from albums four through six, each album is a separate adventure.

=== The Chronicles of Pandarve ===
Storm and Ember get beamed to the Pandarve multiverse, where they meet Nomad, and a new enemy: Marduk, the Theocrat of Pandarve. Marduk wants to catch Storm, because Storm is an anomaly (he imbalances the multiverse because he traveled through time) and is the key to give him power over the multiverse. The Pandarve multiverse is a bubble of breathable gas surrounding a white hole that contains Pandarve itself, and thousands of other planetary objects. The main body, Pandarve, is a giant telluric planet. On Pandarve, the normal physical laws are no longer valid; this gave Don and Martin room for incredible stories and magnificent scenery. Also, Pandarve is a living planet - which means it has intellect and can even interact with other beings. For this interaction she normally relies on her Theocrat, but she is also capable of creating a humanlike representation of herself as Alice from Alice in Wonderland.

Storm's two-time time travel history remains important to the stories, but as Ember has also travelled through time (in The Legend of Yggdrasil, they both arrive in a certain time period together), she is (or should be) an anomaly as well. This fact is never really used in the stories.

Other planets and planetoids in the Pandarve multiverse described in the chronicles are:

- Farseid - a synthetic ring world controlled by robots. (The Robots of Farseid)
- Eriban - a paradise-like planet containing the academy for slayers. (The Slayer of Eriban)
- Kyrte - the small home-planetoid of tariev-fisher Rann. (The Pirates of Pandarve)
- Marrow - a crystal-shaped planet, home of the Barsaman-games. (The Slayer of Eriban)
- Red Tear - a satellite of Pandarve, a few kilometers above the ocean near the city Aromater. (The Seven of Aromater)
- Vertiga Bas - a small pirate planet. (The Pirates of Pandarve)
- Waterplanetoid - a fisher-world completely covered with water. (Vandaahl the Destroyer)

The last three albums (The Von Neumann Machine, The Genesis Equation and The Armageddon Traveller) form a trilogy wherein Storm & co and Marduk need to work together to save Pandarve from perdition. A strange, gigantic "spaceship" (referred to as the Intruder) is headed for a collision with Pandarve, which will mean the end of both entities. The "spaceship" consists of various "cocoons". Some time around the 21st century, one "cocoon" was sent into space with the purpose of making replicas of itself. But because of a system error, the strangest "cocoons" started to emerge (including one resembling Heaven and one the Hell from La Divina Commedia) and cluttered together instead of floating off. There are some references to well-known stories (Alice in Wonderland, Hänsel und Gretel, Sherlock Holmes, ..), movies (My Little Chickadee and other Western influences), celebrity actors (Marlene Dietrich and Marilyn Monroe, ..) and some mathematical theorems (the Genesis Formula, Goldbach's Conjecture and Fermat's Last Theorem).

=== Chronicles of Meanwhile ===
About the time when The Genesis Equation was published, a spin-off series was started, called Chronicles of Meanwhile. The episodes take place between albums 6 and 7 of The Chronicles of the Deep World. Three episodes were released, drawn by Dick Matena, the first two under his pseudonym John Kelly. By late 2022 Eppo magazine began to serialize the fourth and final episode after a 25-year hiatus. Writer Martin Lodewijk and comic artist Apri Kusbiantoro concluded this series and released as the last album in 2024.

=== Continuation ===
Cover of the Storm album De Navel van de Dubbele God - (The Navel of the Double God).

Three years after Don Lawrence died, a new team continued his work. Martin Lodewijk maintained the writer role, while Romano Molenaar and Jorg De Vos were selected as artists. Their first album The Navel of the Double God (De Navel van de Dubbele God) has been available since September 6, 2007 in Dutch. Storm 23 has already been reprinted and has given Storm a renewed international interest. The next album, titled Marduk's Springs, was released in February 2009.

Since July 2008 there has been a second team working on Storm: Minck Oosterveer as artist and Willem Ritstier as writer. This spin-off was called "The Chronicles of the Outer Ring" Their first and only album was called The Exile of Thoem. The series was put on hold after Oosterveer died in a motorcycle-accident in 2011. In 2025 the series continued with Apri Kusbiantoro as artist and Robbert Damen as writer.

=== Chronicles of Ember ===
In 2014 Ember was given her own series chronicling the days before she met Storm, the first part was written Roy Thomas and drawn by Romano Molenaar, the current artist of Storm. From part 2, the series will be written by Rob van Bavel and each story will be pre-published in Eppo magazine.

- 1 De legende van Krill (2014; written by Roy Thomas)
- 2 De vijfde toren (2016; written by Rob van Bavel)
- 3 De Ark van Noorach (2016; written by Rob van Bavel)
- 4 Het Zwevende Gewest (2018; written by Rob van Bavel)
- 5 De reuzen van het Gebroken Rif (2019; written by Rob van Bavel)

== Albums ==
=== Prologue ===
Written by Vince Wernham, art by Don Lawrence

1. Commander Grek - Prisoners of time (Commandant Grek - Gevangenen van de tijd; 1976 - first printed in 1984)

=== The Chronicles of the Deep World ===
Various writers; art by Don Lawrence

1. The Deep World (De Diepe Wereld, 1978; written by Philip "Saul" Dunn)
2. The Last Fighter (De Laatste Vechter, 1979; written by Martin Lodewijk)
3. The People of the Desert (Het Volk van de Woestijn, 1979; written by Dick Matena)
4. The Green Hell (De Groene Hel, 1980; written by Dick Matena)
5. The Battle for Earth (De Strijd om de Aarde, 1980; written by Dick Matena)
6. The Secret of the Nitron Rays (Het Geheim van de Nitronstralen, 1981; written by Dick Matena)
7. The Legend of Yggdrasil (De Legende van Yggdrasil, 1981; written by Kelvin Gosnell)
8. City of the Damned (Stad der Verdoemden, 1982; written by Kelvin Gosnell)
9. The Creeping Death (De Sluimerende Dood, 1982; written by Don Lawrence)

=== The Chronicles of Pandarve ===
Written by Martin Lodewijk, art by Don Lawrence

1. The Pirates of Pandarve (De Piraten van Pandarve, 1983)
2. The Labyrinth of Death (Het Doolhof van de Dood, 1983)
3. The Seven of Aromater (De Zeven van Aromater, 1984)
4. The Slayer of Eriban (De Doder van Eriban, 1985)
5. The Dogs of Marduk (De Honden van Marduk, 1985)
6. The Living Planet (De Levende Planeet, 1986)
7. Vandaahl the Destroyer (Vandaahl de Verderver, 1987)
8. The Twisted World (De Wentelwereld, 1988)
9. The Robots of Far Sied (De Robots van Danderzei, 1990)
10. Return of the Red Prince (De Terugkeer van de Rode Prins, 1991)
11. The Von Neumann Machine (De Von Neumann-Machine, 1993)
12. The Genesis Equation (De Genesis-Formule, 1995)
13. The Armageddon Traveller (De Armageddon Reiziger, 2001)

Written by Martin Lodewijk, art by Romano Molenaar

1. The Navel of the Double God (De Navel van de Dubbele God, 2007)
2. Marduk's Springs (De Bronnen van Marduk, 2009)
3. The Red Trail (Het Rode Spoor, 2010)

Written by Jorg de Vos, art by Romano Molenaar

1. The Mutineers of Anchor (De Muiters van Anker, 2011)
2. The Guards of the Tracks (De Wisselwachters, 2012)

Written by Dick Matena, art by Romano Molenaar

1. The Race of Opale City (De Race van Opaal, 2013)

Written by Rob van Bavel, art by Romano Molenaar

1. The Coral of Kesmee (Het Koraal van Kesmee, 2015)
2. The Executioner of Torkien (De Beul van Torkien, 2017)

=== Chronicles of Meanwhile ===
Written by Martin Lodewijk, art by Dick Matena

1. The Voyager Virus (Het Voyager Virus, 1996)
2. The Dallas Paradox (De Dallas Paradox, 1997)
3. The Stargorger (De Sterrenvreter, 1998)

Written by Martin Lodewijk, art by Apri Kusbiantoro

1. Klein Space (De Ruimte van Klein, 2024)

=== Chronicles of the Outer Ring ===
Written by Willem Ritstier, art by Minck Oosterveer

1. The Expatriate of Thoem (De Banneling van Thoem, 2011)

=== The Collection ===
The Deluxe volumes are hardback with a leather cover, gold imprint and dust jacket. Each bundle contains two albums and a part of the Storm-dossier "The Search for Storm". The last part also contains "Storm - The Big Picture" which gives an overview of Storm in the press, Storm expositions, the status of Storm in the modern comic scene and a portfolio. Only available in Dutch and English.

1. The Collection - Part 1 (contains The Deep World, The Last Fighter and The search for Storm - part 1, 2000)
2. The Collection - Part 2 (contains The People of the Desert, Green Hell and The search for Storm - part 2, 2000)
3. The Collection - Part 3 (contains The Battle for Earth, The Secret of the Nitron Rays and The search for Storm - part 3, 2001)
4. The Collection - Part 4 (contains The Legend of Yggdrasil, City of the Damned and The search for Storm - part 4, 2001)
5. The Collection - Part 5 (contains The Creeping Death, The Pirates of Pandarve and The search for Storm - part 5, 2001)
6. The Collection - Part 6 (contains The Labyrinth of Death, The Seven of Aromater and The search for Storm - part 6, 2002)
7. The Collection - Part 7 (contains The Slayer of Eriban, The Hounds of Marduk and The search for Storm - part 7, 2002)
8. The Collection - Part 8 (contains The Living Planet, Vandaahl the Destroyer and The search for Storm - part 8, 2002)
9. The Collection - Part 9 (contains The Twisted World, The Robots of Farseid and The search for Storm - part 9, 2003)
10. The Collection - Part 10 (contains Return of the Red Prince, The Von Neumann Machine and The search for Storm - part 10, 2003)
11. The Collection - Part 11 (contains The Genesis Equation, The Armageddon Traveler and The search for Storm - part 11, 2003)
12. The Collection - Part 12 (contains Commander Grek, Storm - The Big Picture and The search for Storm - part 12, 2003)

== See also ==
- Don Lawrence
- The Trigan Empire
