= Martin Lodewijk =

Dutch comic creator (born 1939)

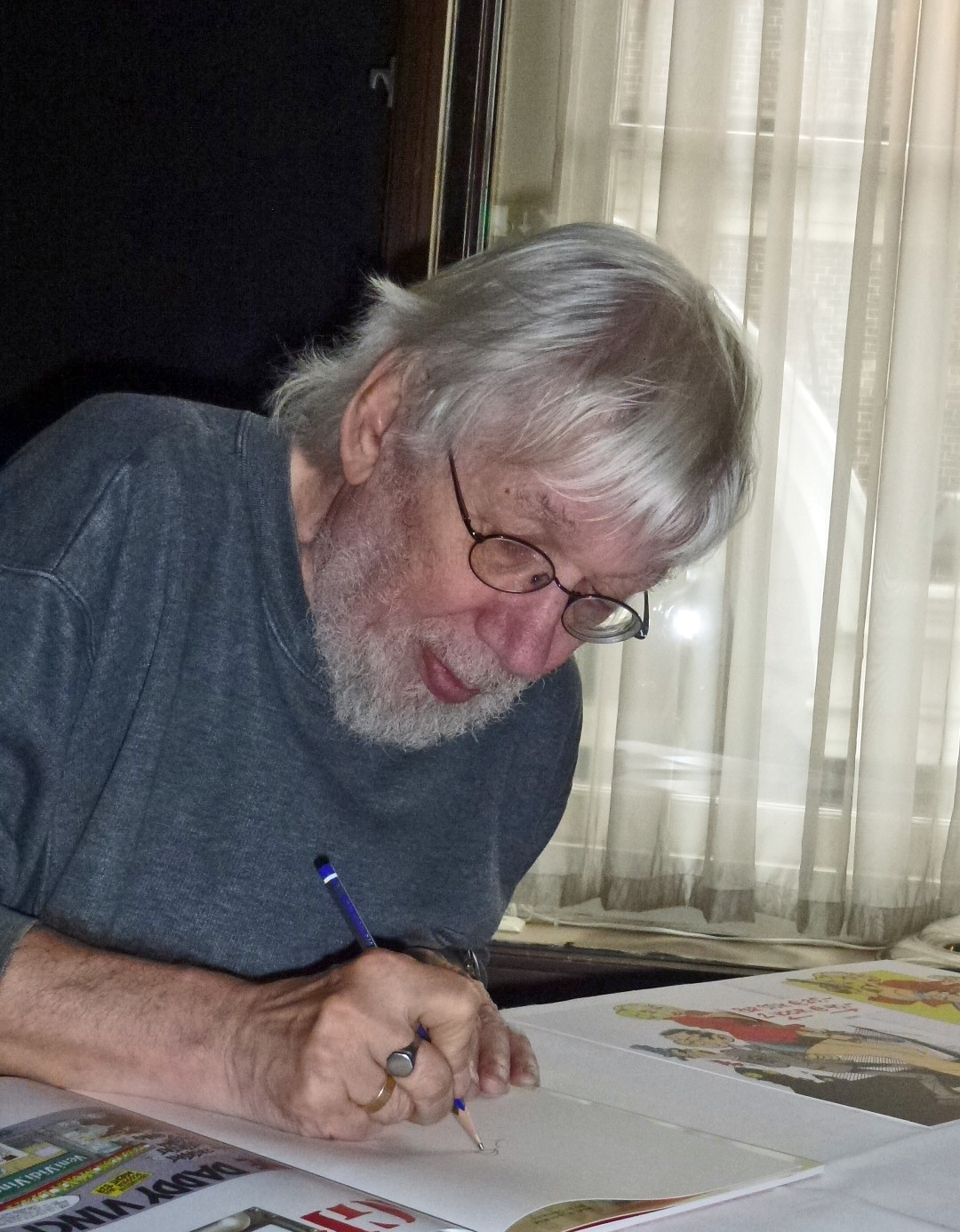
- Born: Martinus Spyridon Johannes Lodewijk; 30 April 1939 (age 87) Rotterdam, Netherlands
- Areas: Cartoonist, Writer, Artist, Editor
- Notable works: Agent 327
- Awards: Stripschapprijs, 1978; Knight of the Order of Orange-Nassau, 2011

Martinus Spyridon Johannes Lodewijk (born 30 April 1939) is a Dutch comics writer and cartoonist, and advertising illustrator.

Martin Lodewijk was born in Rotterdam. He dropped out of high school in 1957, and started drawing cartoons, notably of spacecraft and pirates. In 1959, his first cartoon was published in the newspaper Het Parool, after which he specialized in drawing for commercial advertising. For the weekly comics magazine Pep, he co-created with Jan Kruis the Agent 327 comic in 1966, a feature he ended up writing and drawing for close to fifty years. He provided scripts for other strips, such as Don Lawrence's Storm. After Pep and Sjors merged into Eppo, Lodewijk became Eppo's chief editor.

In 1999, Lodewijk published the world's smallest comic book; Minimum Bug (26 mm by 37 mm). It belongs to the Agent 327 series.

From 2004 onward, Lodewijk succeeded Willy Vandersteen and Karel Biddeloo as writer for De Rode Ridder, with drawings by Claus Scholz.

Lodewijk worked on the third open source movie by the Blender Foundation, Sintel, released in 2010.

== Personal life ==
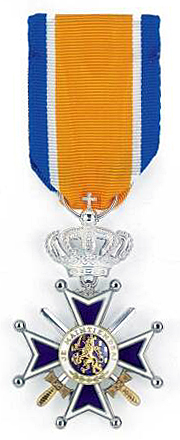
Medal of the Knight of the Order of Orange-Nassau

In 1973, Martin Lodewijk and his brother Tim participated in the knowledge quiz show Twee voor Twaalf. The brothers won, and returned for the special jubilee quiz in 2005, where they reached the finals.

Lodewijk also plays ukulele, guitar and banjo. He performed in the Bobby Shaftoe Skiffle Group and the bluegrass band Chickenfeed.

== Awards ==
For his whole work in comics, Lodewijk was presented the Stripschapprijs in 1978, the highest award in the Dutch comics world.

On 29 April 2011 Martin Lodewijk was invested as a Knight of the Order of Orange-Nassau. He received this royal medal because of his comic work.

== Comics ==
- Agent 327 — all volumes (artist and writer)
- Storm — (writer)
- January Jones
- Johnny Goodbye
- Bernard Voorzichtig
- De Rode Ridder (writer)
- Lucky Luke, Volume: La Corde du pendu 1982 (Eng: "The Rope of the Hanged") (writer)
