= Roel Dijkstra =

Roel Dijkstra is a Dutch comic book series about a fictional football player. The series was created in 1975 by Jan Steeman (1933-2018; winner of the 2005 Dutch Stripschapprijs) and Andries Brandt. The first 21 volumes, drawn by Steeman and his successors, were published between 1977 and 1995 by Dutch publisher Oberon. Steeman and Brandt produced the first ten.

== Background ==
The eponymous Roel Dijkstra is a Dutch football player inspired by Johan Cruijff. He started out as a player with the local football club "FC Leidrecht", then moved on to "FC Hadfort" in the United Kingdom, "FC Union" in Corsica, and then "FC Rapiditas" in Spain before returning to "FC LeIdrecht". The story revolves around Dijkstra and his difficulties adjusting to life in a foreign country, shifty club bosses, friendship with fellow players, and football championships.

In 2017 and 2018 two more volumes were released, Thuisfront (Homefront) and Pamplona. Both were serialised in the revived Eppo-magazine.

== Titles ==
No.	Title	Year	Writers
1.	Buitenspel & Doorbraak	1977	Jan Steeman/Andrew Brandt
2.	Hattrick	1977	Jan Steeman/Andrew Brandt
3.	Obstructie	1978	Jan Steeman/Andrew Brandt
4.	Gevaarlijk spel	1978	Jan Steeman/Andrew Brandt
5.	Op vreemd terrein	1979	Jan Steeman/Andrew Brandt
6.	Hard tegen hard	1980	Jan Steeman/Andrew Brandt
7.	De superspits	1981	Jan Steeman/Andrew Brandt
8.	Het magische veld	1981	Jan Steeman/Andrew Brandt
9.	Thuiswedstrijd	1982	Jan Steeman/Andrew Brandt
10.	Venijn op Corsica	1982	Jan Steeman/Andrew Brandt
11.	De maarschalk	1983	Keith Watson/Dave Hunt
12.	Amerikaans avontuur	1983	Keith Watson/Dave Hunt
13.	Uitgeschakeld	1984	Keith Watson/Jaap Bubenik
14.	De invaller	1985	Keith Watson/Jaap Bubenik
15.	De miljoenentransfer	1985	Keith Watson/Jaap Bubenik
16.	De schijnbeweging	1987	Keith Watson/Jaap Bubenik
17.	De sponsor	1987	Keith Watson/Jaap Bubenik
18.	De zwarte toto	1992	Keith Watson/Jaap Bubenik
19.	Het contract	1992	Lebovic Marinko/Jaap Bubenik
20.	Ebony	1994	Lebovic Marinko/Roy Robson
21.	Het mijnenveld	1995	Lebovic Marinko/Roy Robson
22.	Thuisfront	2017	Roelof Wijtsma/Willem Ritstier
23.	Pamplona	2018	Roelof Wijtsma/Willem Ritstier
