= Agent 327 =

- The main characters of Agent 327 (right to left): Agent 327, The Chief, Miss Betsy, Barend

Publication information
- Publisher: Geïllustreerde Pers
- First appearance: Pep #21 (1966)
- Created by: Martin Lodewijk

In-story information
- Alter ego: Hendrik IJzerbroot
- Team affiliations: Dutch Secret Service, Swiss Secret Service
- Abilities: Master of disguise

Agent 327 is a Dutch action comedy comic series by cartoonist Martin Lodewijk. It was a regular feature from 1966 until 1983, and again from 2000 to the present. The eponymous Agent 327 is a James Bond/Maxwell Smart-like Dutch secret agent who fights for "Righteousness and World Peace"; his looks are based on the character of Peter Gunn. Often partnered with the junoesque Olga Lawina (an agent of the Swiss Secret Service), his adventures take him around Europe and the rest of the world as he battles numerous villains, both fictional and parodies of real people.

The song "Denk toch altijd met liefd' aan je moeder" by Gerda en Herman Timmerhout is a common feature in the comic, and is often used to hideously torture someone or provide a plot-turning emotional reaction.

== Publication history ==
Agent 327 debuted in 1966 as a feature in Pep magazine #21, written and drawn by Martin Lodewijk and published by Geïllustreerde Pers. Agent 327 ran in Pep as a weekly 4-8-page feature until 1975, when Pep and the comics magazine Sjors merged into Eppo, published by Oberon.

Meanwhile, in 1970 Geïllustreerde Pers published the first Agent 327 album, titled Dossier Stemkwadrater. Further albums followed every few years, continuing under Oberon after Pep's acquisition.

Agent 327 was cancelled as a feature in Eppo in 1983, but returned in 2000 as a regular feature. In 2009, Agent 327 returned to Eppo as a regular feature.

== Characters ==
=== Main characters ===
Agent 327
Initiated into the world of espionage in the Dutch resistance, his creative and elaborate disguises just to get to work in the morning form a running gag and catchphrase: Grrrutjes-nog-aan-toe, wat een geheim agent toch allemaal niet moet doen om incognito op zijn werk te verschijnen (translation:"Heavens above, what a secret agent has to do these days to arrive at his job without being recognized.). Agent 327's real name, Hendrik IJzerbroot, is derived from the Dutch political figure Hendrik Koekoek and an allusion to the Dutch resistance fighter Bernardus IJzerdraat. The character's physical features were modelled after actor Craig Stevens who played in Peter Gunn.

The Chief
One of his main concerns is to keep the costs down.

Willemse
The doorman. When Agent 327 wants to enter the premises they exchange pass words.

Miss Betsy
The secretary of the office. Obviously modelled after Miss Moneypenny.

Olga Lawina
A Swiss secret agent partnered with Agent 327 in a wide variety of adventures. Her good looks often present both an advantage and a liability.

=== Recurring villains ===
Boris Kloris
Ruthless spy with paper white skin.

Dr. Maybe
Brother of Dr. Yes and Dr. No. With his assistant Fi Doh, and sometimes Herr Dr. Vonvonderstein.

Colonel Bauer
German officer who held many war secrets.

=== Minor (real life) characters ===
Martin Lodewijk
Member of several jug bands. First appearing with the badly-received Endatteme Jugband, he now plays with Chickenfeed.

Jan Tromp
Struggling painter who was drafted by Boris Kloris to forge Rembrandt's The Night Watch. After being exposed he confessed that he'd turned down an offer to draw a one-page family comic for a women's magazine.

== Adaptations ==
=== Albums ===
- 1 Dossier Heksenkring & Dossier Onderwater (1975)
- 2 Dossier Zondagskind (1976)
- 3 Dossier Zevenslaper (1977)
- 4 Dossier Stemkwadrater (1970, 1979)
- 5 Dossier Leeuwenkuil (1973, 1979)
- 6 Dossier Dozijn Min Eén (1980)
- 7 Dossier Nachtwacht (1980)
- 8 Dossier Dozijn Min Twee (1981)
- 9 De gesel van Rotterdam (1981)
- 10 Drie avonturen (1982)
- 11 De ogen van Wu Manchu (1983)
- 12 De vergeten bom (2000)
- 13 Het pad van de schildpad (2001)
- 14 Cacoïne en commando's (2001)
- 15 De golem van Antwerpen (2002)
- 16 De wet van alles (2002)
- 17 Hotel New York (2002)
- 18 Het oor Van Gogh (2003)
- 19 De vlucht van vroeger (2005)
- 20 De Daddy Vinci-code (2015)
- 21 Drie avonturen (to be published)
- Dossier Minimum Bug (1999) (not an element of the official series)

== Other versions ==
Blender Conference 2016: The trailer in development

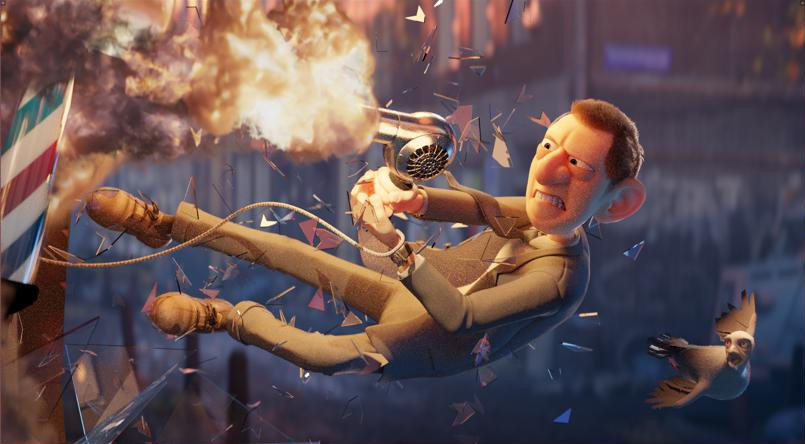
Martin Lodewijk helped Blender to develop its 3D version of Hendrik IJzerbroot

=== Agent 327: Operation Barbershop ===
On May 15, 2017, the Blender Foundation released a teaser trailer that was almost four minutes long, for an upcoming animated feature film based on the comic. It stars 327 as he investigates a barbershop, battles his nemesis Boris, and learns the dangerous truth about the shop. The 3-minute film was released online as a proof of concept to attract funding for a feature-length adaptation. The trailer won 11 film awards for best short film or best animated short film.

At the Blender Conference in November 2017, producer Ton Roosendaal mentioned that the film industry really loved the trailer. It was fresh, new and had potential. The original story for the film didn't resonate in Hollywood, and a new story was developed that was solid enough to transform into a script. Roosendaal revealed the working title of the full feature film as: Agent 327, The Case of the Einstein Enigma. In January 2018, an alternative ending to the trailer was published.

=== Tribute stories ===
Between 2017 and 2019, Eppo pre-published twenty-one shorties drawn and scripted by others. They were released as two volumes.

== Translation ==
The agent's name has been changed in several languages:

- Danish: Hans Harkhoost
- German: Otto Otto (O.O.) Eisenbrot
- Norwegian: Henrik Eisenbrot
- Spanish: Enrique Panférreo
- Swedish: Otto Otto Gärning
