= Ranger (magazine) =

British weekly comic, 1965 to 1966

- The cover of Ranger's first issue from 18 September 1965. Art by Ferdinando Tacconi.

Publication information
- Publisher: Fleetway Publications
- Schedule: Weekly
- Format: Ongoing series
- Publication date: 18 September 1965 – 18 June 1966
- No. of issues: 40

Creative team
- Created by: Leonard Matthews
- Written by: Mike Butterworth; Geoff Duke; Bobby Moore; Graham Tomlinson
- Artist(s): Jesús Blasco; Geoff Campion; Roland Fiddy; Don Lawrence; Eric Parker
- Editor: John Sanders

Ranger was a weekly British comics periodical published by Fleetway Publications from 18 September 1965 to 18 June 1966. Intended as an educational publication, the cover described it as "The National Boys' Magazine" and the content mixed comic strips with a much larger quotient of factual articles than most other Fleetway children's titles of the time. Ranger lasted 40 issues before being merged with Fleetway's fellow educational title Look and Learn in 1966.

Despite its mainly factual remit, Ranger is best remembered for debuting Mike Butterworth and Don Lawrence's fantasy epic comic strip "The Rise and Fall of the Trigan Empire".

== Creation ==
Fleetway veteran director of publications Leonard Matthews had devised the educational Look and Learn weekly magazine in 1962, and assigned his prodigy John Sanders to edit the magazine after becoming unhappy with the direction taken with original editor David Stone. The result was judged a success, and by 1965 Sanders was looking for a fresh challenge. Matthews assigned him to the newly conceived Ranger, which was another of Fleetway's attempts to match the success of Eagle by blending exciting adventure serials with the respectability of factual content and higher production values. Despite feeling the dummy was "a poor man's Eagle", Sanders took the assignment to gain experience of working with picture strips.

Printed on high quality photogravure 10" x 13" paper, the first issue of Ranger was 40 pages, around half of which were in colour, and priced at 1/-. Throughout the title's life the cover featured specially commissioned painted artwork, based on a factual subject that was covered inside. Regular educational features included "Your World Today", a collection of spectacular or interesting photographs from recent events around the world; "Bobby Moore's World of Sport", an illustrated column purportedly by the West Ham and England captain; military history strand "The Story of the Soldier"; eyewitness historical account series "At First Hand"; aviation thoughts from test pilot Neville Duke; a car feature from Formula Three racing driver Graham Tomlinson; annotated machinery in "Looking into Things"; a succession of real life tales penned by Biggles creator W. E. Johns (taken from The Biggles Book of Treasure Hunting); and historical picture quiz "What Why Where Who When?".

Picture stories also had an educational undercurrent. "The Adventures of Macbeth" retold the William Shakespeare tragedy, while classic literature was represented by an adaptation of Robert Louis Stevenson's Treasure Island. Elsewhere, "Britons Never, Never, Never Shall Be Slaves!" attempted to repurpose René Goscinny and Albert Uderzo's Asterix series into a comic history of ancient Britons, with Asterix the Gaul renamed 'Beric the Bold' and Obelix referred to as 'the son of Boadicea'. The British weekly perennial of a school serial was provided by "Rob Riley". Fantasy was delved into by two other stories; "Space Cadet" followed Jason January of the Royal Space Force Academy, and was peppered with occasional facts about space and history, while "The Rise and Fall of the Trigan Empire" was initially an ersatz retelling of legends of Ancient Rome through the filter of the Earth-like Trigan people of Elekton. Most of the strips were devised by Matthews and Sanders but written by Mike Butterworth, and featured art from many of the company's most talented artists including Don Lawrence, Jesús Blasco and Geoff Campion, while Frank Hampson (albeit via unused previous work), Ron Embleton, Ferdinando Tacconi and Eric Parker would contribute to covers and factual pieces.

Many of the strips attempted to push their educational aspect by predominantly using the text comics format, with large text captions and relatively sparse use of speech bubbles. Cartoons meanwhile were provided by a page from Roland Fiddy, with the first issue introducing the cartoonist by noting his connection to Punch. While text stories had been on the decline in other Fleetway titles they fitted the image of Ranger; the first issue debuted John Hunter's western "The Range Rider", and from the second it was joined by a serialisation of Richard Armstrong's novel Sea Change.

== Publication history ==
At launch, Matthews announced the title was aimed at boys aged between 10 and 15, and be published every Monday. The print run for the first issue was 500,000 copies Dated 18 September 1965, (Note: British comics of the period bore their off-sale date on the covers.) and Ranger was heavily advertised in other Fleetway titles. The first issue included a booklet on BOAC's new Vickers VC10 airliner as a free gift; the second included a Donald Campbell's Book of Record Breakers album and a selection of colour picture cards for the readers to glue into place inside; the balance of the cards were included in the third issue.

The cover of Ranger from 26 March 1966.

Despite this and the starry line-up, initial sales were sluggish and the contents were reconfigured - further picture strips were added in the form of adaptations of King Solomon's Mines and Blood on the Prairie were added, with "At First Hand" and "The Adventures of Macbeth" making way. This caused sales to stabilise and, combined with Matthews' passionate defence of the title in a meeting with the board, won Ranger a stay of execution at the 26-week mark (at the time it took around six months for meaningful sales data and trends to be analysed by Fleetway). Autumn saw the title's first spin-off launched, an annual for the Christmas market - in keeping with the weekly's self-identification as a magazine this was known as the Ranger Book rather than an annual. However, after the plateau sales then began to drop again, despite a drop to 32 pages to boost profitability.

The magazine's high price - three times that of a standard comic - was a large factor in its failure. Sanders himself would note Ranger was "a huge floperoo" and led to considerable schadenfreude given his previous status as Matthews' "golden-boy editor". He would later recall that Matthews, who had long desired to make a magazine like Ranger, largely refused to relinquish full control of the title, preventing Sanders from making the changes he felt were necessary to make it a success. Sanders also felt the magazine was a casualty of inter-departmental rivalries in Fleetway, though he would summarise that the title as a whole was "a poor idea, badly executed, overpriced [...] and targeted at a market that didn't exist anymore".

To avoid the costly process of cancellation, as was typical of the time Ranger was merged into another title, a practice which would typically result in a boost in the 'new' combined publication's circulation. The chosen target was the purely factual Look and Learn, and Ranger was incorporated into the educational magazine from 25 June 1966, with the masthead reading Look and Learn incorporating Ranger Magazine to avoid a clumsy-sounding compound name. As Look and Learn already had a plethora of factual pages, only the strips "Rise and Fall of the Trigan Empire", "Space Cadet", "Rob Riley" and "Dan Dakota - Lone Gun" continued, while a second attempt was made to adapt the Asterix material as "In the Days of Good Queen Cleo". Sanders was uneasy with adding fictional content to Look and Learn, though he would agree that "Trigan Empire" was "the best thing in Ranger" and deserved to continue. The strip would ultimately survive until Look and Learn itself ended in 1982.

In November 2004, the factual content of Ranger was purchased from IPC Media by Look and Learn Magazines Ltd. IPC retained the fictional contents until they were sold to Rebellion Developments in 2018 as part of their purchase of the pre-1970 Amalgamated Press/Fleetway/IPC comic library.

== Stories ==
=== The Adventures of Macbeth ===
Published: 18 September to 27 November 1965
Artist: Ruggero Giovannini

After a successful campaign for King Duncan, axe-wielding Thane of Glamis and warrior Macbeth decides to rapidly advance his career.

- Based on the play by William Shakespeare but with modified dialogue. The serial was subsequently collected in Ranger The National Boys' Magazine by Bear Alley Books.

=== Britons Never, Never, Never Shall Be Slaves! ===
Published: 18 September 1965 to 18 June 1966
Writer: René Goscinny
Artist: Albert Uderzo

When Romans invade Britain in 55 BC much of the population is under their yoke. However, Chief Caradoc and his village hold out thanks to a magic potion brewed by Doric the Druid, the exceptional cunning of the diminutive Beric the Bold and the superhuman strength of the son of Boadicea.

- Modified, full-colour adaptations of "Asterix" from Pilote, beginning with Asterix and the Big Fight. This was the second attempt by Fleetway to run an Asterix adaptation; in 1963 black-and-white versions had been run in Valiant under the name "Little Fred and Big Ed", ending around five months before the launch of Ranger. After the merger with Look and Learn, the story was refashioned into "In the Days of Good Queen Cleo", modified from Asterix and Cleopatra. After Fleetway dropped the Asterix licence, definitive English translations more faithful to the originals began in 1969, written by Anthea Bell and Derek Hockridge.

=== Champion of the Spanish Main ===
Published: 27 November 1965 to 22 January 1966
Writer: W. E. Johns

Young boy Mark Lawson helps Captain John Champion of the ship Rose of England combat the barbaric pirate Gabriel Rochelle.

- Text story. Reprints of a 1939 serial from Amalgamated Press' story paper The Modern Boy.

=== Dan Dakota - Lone Gun ===
Published: 19 February to 2 April & 23 April to 28 May 1966
Artist: Arturo del Castillo

Sheriff and gunfighter Dan Dakota fights outlaws in the Old West.

- Continued in Look and Learn.

=== The Demon King ===
Published: 29 January to 26 March 1966
Artist: Eric Parker

Richard, Duke of Gloucester murders his way through Plantagenet high society.

- Based on the play by William Shakespeare; like "The Adventures of Macbeth", the dialogue was heavily modified.

=== The Globe Mutiny ===
Published: 4 December 1965 to 8 January 1966
Artist: Franco Caprioli

The crew of the whaler Globe kill the captain and his fellow officers before trying to set up a kingdom on Mili Atoll.

=== Hold-Up in Cougar Canyon ===
Published: 14 May to 18 June 1966
Writer: Thurlow Craig

- Text story.

=== The Range Rider ===
Published: 18 September 1965 to 12 February 1966
Writer: John Hunter

Jimmy Stannard escapes death at the hands of Big Bill Smith shortly before the latter and his gang are butchered by Sioux. Stannard hopes to find the location of the treasure his uncle left them by finding Smith's surviving native guide.

- Text story.

=== Rip Solar ===
Published: 18 February to 30 April 1966
Artist: Geoff Campion

Major Rip Solar of Space-Patrol lands on a planet taken over by criminal Butch Bomba.

- A modified version of the Captain Condor serial "Captain Condor and the Planet of Destruction" from Lion.

=== The Rise and Fall of the Trigan Empire ===
Published: 18 September 1965 to 18 June 1966
Writer: Mike Butterworth
Artist: Don Lawrence

Tales from the alien culture of Elekton in which futuristic technology, such as antigravity vehicles and energy ray weapons, was blended with architecture, dress, and customs reminiscent of ancient civilizations.

- Printed in full colour and continued in Look and Learn, later retitled simply "The Trigan Empire".

=== Rob Riley ===
Published: 18 September 1965 to 18 June 1966
Artist: Jesús Blasco

Son of a Merchant Navy captain, Rob Riley enrols in a prestigious boarding school in Westhaven-on-Sea.

- Continued in Look and Learn.

=== Space Cadet ===
Published: 18 September 1965 to 18 June 1966
Writer: Mike Butterworth
Artist: Geoff Campion

Jason January trains as an astronaut in the Royal Space Force Academy at Portsmouth.

- Printed in full colour and continued in Look and Learn, later retitled "Jason January, Space Cadet".

=== Tanker Trap ===
Published: 19 February to 18 June 1966
Writer: Arthur Catherall

The damaged tanker Sunbawa beaches on a shoal with Ahmat, the mate of the tug Bulldog, trapped onboard. Shipmates Husky and Jack prepare to mount a rescue.

- Text story, later collected as part of Catherall's Bulldog series of novels.

=== Literary adaptations ===
==== Treasure Island ====
Published: 18 September 1965 to 22 January 1966

- Based on the novel by Robert Louis Stevenson.

==== Sea Change ====
Published: 25 September 1965 to 5 February 1966

- Text story. Based on the novel by Richard Armstrong.

==== King Solomon's Mines ====
Published: 23 October 1965 to 12 February 1966

- Based on the novel by H. Rider Haggard.

==== Blood on the Prairie ====
Published: 20 November 1965 to 16 April 1966
Artist: Alberto Giolitti

- Based on the novel by Paul Wellman.

==== Moby Dick ====
Published: 12 February to 19 March 1966
Artist: Franco Caprioli

- Based on the novel by Herman Melville.

==== The Black Arrow ====
Published: 19 March to 18 June 1966

- Based on the novel by Robert Louis Stevenson.

==== Allan Quartermain ====
Published: 2 April to 18 June 1966

- Based on the novel by H. Rider Haggard.

==== Around the World in Eighty Days ====
Published: 2 April to 14 May 1966
Artist: Eric Parker

- Based on the novel by Jules Verne.

==== Rodney Stone ====
Published: 30 April to 18 June 1966
Artist: Carlos V. Roume

- Based on the novel by Arthur Conan Doyle.

=== Short stories ===
- "Gideon's Trap" by John Creasey (18 September 1965)
- "Gideon's Friendly Hand" by John Creasey (25 September 1965)
  - Based on the television series Gideon's Way.
- "Appointment in Samara" by W. Somerset Maugham
- "Gold from Crete" by C. S. Forester
