= Henk Kuijpers =

Dutch comics artist

- Born: Henk Kuijpers; 10 December 1946 (age 79) Haarlem, Netherlands
- Areas: Artist, Writer
- Notable works: Franka

Henk Kuijpers (born 10 December 1946 in Haarlem, Netherlands) is a comics artist most famous for his Franka series.

== Comics ==
Cover of a Franka album

- Franka, 23 comic albums
- Bars, 2 albums

Kuijpers' Franka comics work features a strong model-like female sleuth solving mysteries, often in exotic locales. The series' images are drawn in strong lines with balanced weight, a style often classified as ligne claire.

== Awards ==
Kuijpers received the Stripschapprijs prize in 1990.
