= Mike Butterworth =

British comic book writer (1924–1986)

- Born: John Michael Butterworth; 10 January 1924 Nottingham, Nottinghamshire, England
- Died: 4 October 1986 (aged 62)
- Area: Writer
- Pseudonyms: Carola Salisbury, Sarah Kemp

John Michael Butterworth (10 January 1924 – 4 October 1986) was a British comic book writer, best known for his comic strip The Rise and Fall of the Trigan Empire in the British weeklies Ranger and Look and Learn.

== Life ==
Butterworth trained as an artist at Camberwell College of Arts and worked briefly as a tutor in drawing at Nottingham College of Art. After briefly working as a salesman, he joined the Amalgamated Press (later renamed Fleetway Publications) after submitting samples of artwork to them. Although these were turned down, he tried again, submitting a script for a sea-going adventure strip. This was accepted and Butterworth was hired as a scriptwriter, at first working primarily Western strips featuring Billy the Kid and Buffalo Bill. His interest in history (particularly naval history) led him to pen many historical comic strips for The Comet and Sun, including the Napoleonic era adventures of Max Bravo, the Happy Hussar and World War II air-ace Battler Britton.

Aside from his writing, Butterworth was a gifted editor and created a number of new papers for the firm including Playhour Pictures (soon after abbreviated to Playhour), Valentine and the teenage girls' magazine Honey.

In 1965, he became one of the main script writers for Ranger where he penned the sprawling science-fantasy The Rise and Fall of the Trigan Empire which remains one of the most popular boys' adventure strips published in the UK to this day.

Butterworth left Fleetway Publications and turned freelance. His first novel, The Soundless Scream, appeared in 1967 followed over the next few years by a number of well-received crime novels which appeared under his full name. His 1983 novel The Man Who Broke the Bank at Monte Carlo was turned into the first musical by Lynn Ahrens and Stephen Flaherty, Lucky Stiff, first performed off-Broadway for Playwrights Horizons in April 1988. His full name has led to some confusion between his work and that of science fiction writer and Savoy Books publisher Michael Butterworth. Butterworth also turned his hand to Gothic romance novels under the pen-name Carola Salisbury.

He died of a heart attack at the age of 62.

== Books ==
- The Soundless Scream (1967)
- Walk Softly in Fear (1968)
- Vanishing Act (1970)
- Flowers for a Dead Witch (1971)
- The Black Look (1972)
- Villa on the Shore (1973)
- The Man in the Sopwith Camel (1974)
- Remains to be Seen (1976)
- Festival (1976)
- X Marks the Spot (1978)
- The Man Who Broke the Bank at Monte Carlo (1983)
- A Virgin on the Rocks (1985)
- The Five Million Dollar Prince (1986)

Novels as Carola Salisbury

- The Pride of the Trevallions (1975; also published as Mallion's Pride)
- Dark Inheritance (1975)
- Dolphin Summer (1976)
- The Winter Bride (1978)
- The Shadowed Spring (1980)
- Count Vronsky's Daughter (1981)
- An Autumn in Araby (1983)
- Daisy Friday (1984)
- A Certain Splendour (1985)
- The Woman in Grey (1987)
