= Frans Piët =

Dutch comics artist (1905–1997)

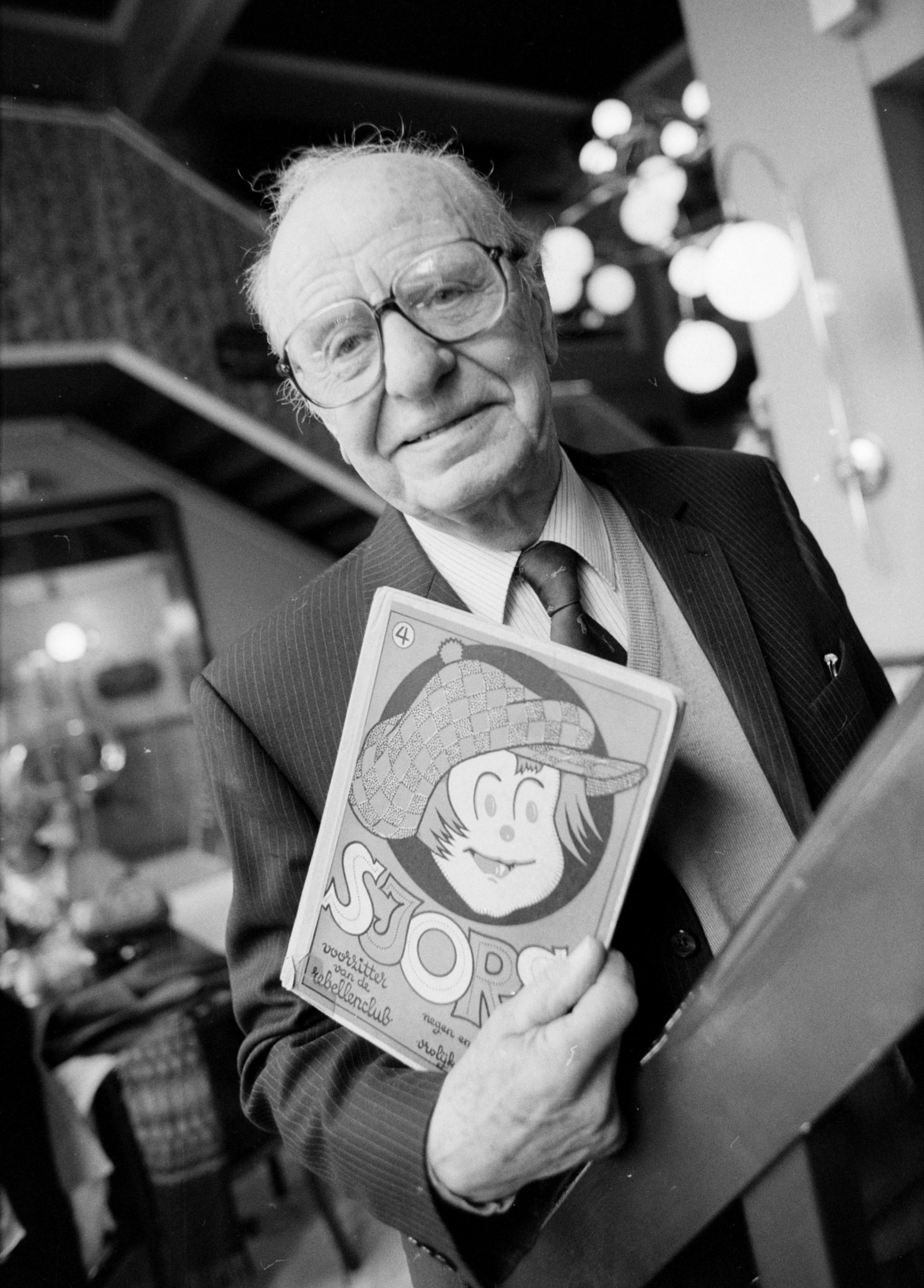
Frans Piët, 1989

Frans Piët (17 February 1905, Haarlem – 5 January 1997) was a Dutch comics artist, most famous as the original creator of the longest-running Dutch comics series of all time: Sjors & Sjimmie.

== Biography ==
He was born in 1905 as the son of a butcher. Originally Piët aspired to become a musician and learned to play violin and saxophone. He even performed in The Blue Ramblers, headed by Pi Scheffer. Near the end of the 1920s he applied for a job at publishing company De Spaarnestad, where he drew patterns for sewing. In 1932 he was asked to draw comics for the children's magazines issued by De Spaarnestad. At the time Martin Branner's Perry Winkle was very popular under its Dutch translation of Sjors and even inspired his own eponymous magazine. When the original American comic strip gradually started to put more focus on Perry's sister, Winnie Winkle, business deals were made with King Features syndicate to create a local version of Branner's character, Sjors, to let the popular series continue with its focus on Sjors. In 1938 Piët became the creator of Sjors van de Rebellenclub (Sjors of the Rebel's Club), as the series was popularly titled. Gradually Sjors would become more its own thing, with storylines set in the Netherlands and a new cast of characters which replaced the original creations of Branner.

After World War II the series was retitled Sjors en Sjimmie (Sjors and Sjimmie) when Sjors met his black friend Sjimmie, who'd become his sidekick. Piët would draw Sjors and Sjimmie until he retired in 1969, after which Jan Kruis continued and modernized the series.

In 1974 Piët made a celebrity comic strip based on the popular children's TV series Tita Tovenaar. He died in 1997 at the age of 91, from an intracranial hemorrhage.
