= Eppo (comics) =

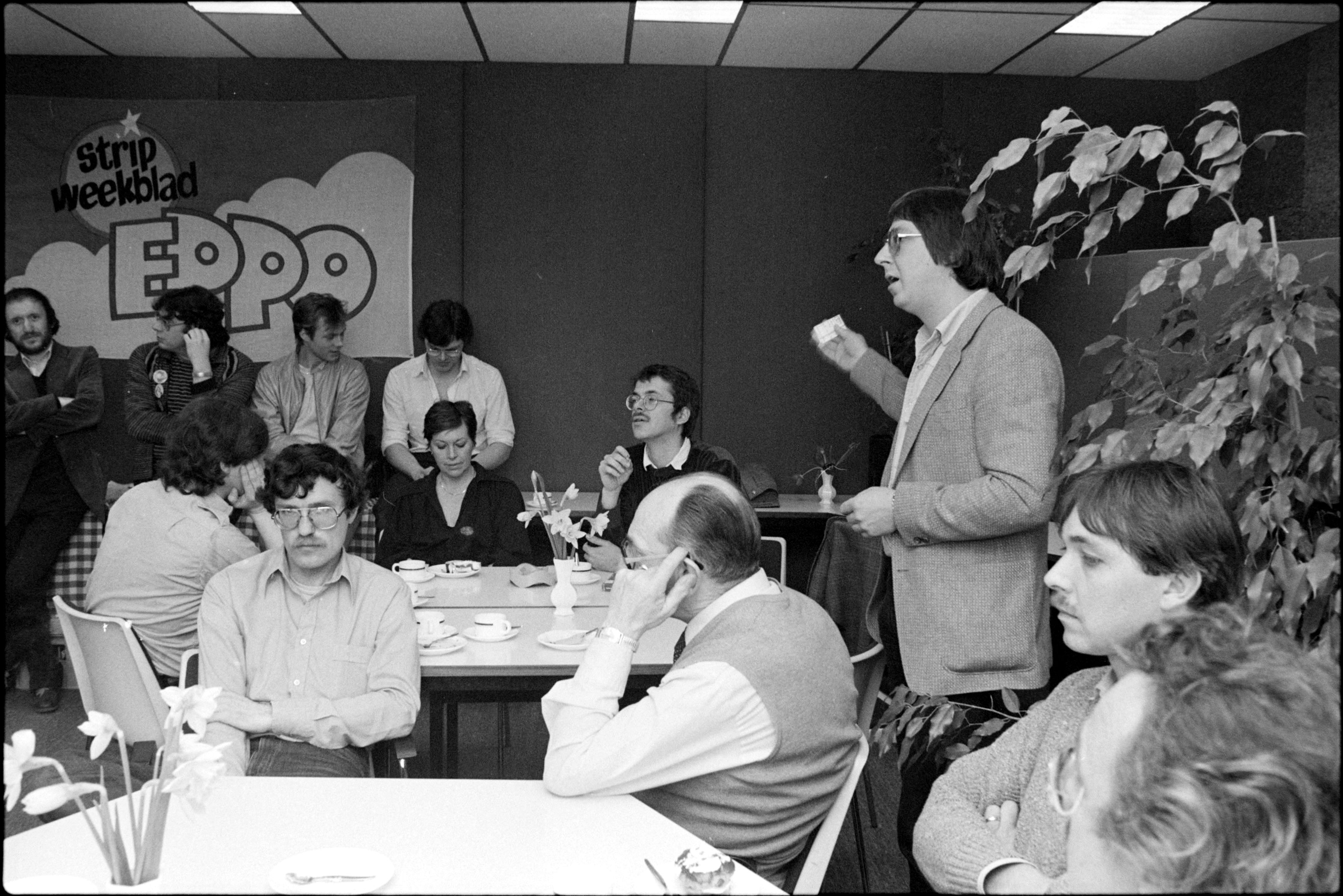
- Gathering of comic authors of Eppo in 1982
- Editor: Martin Lodewijk (1975–?)
- Categories: Comics magazine
- Frequency: Weekly (1975–1988); Biweekly (1988–1999); Biweekly (2009–present)
- Publisher: Oberon
- First issue: September 1975; 2009 (relaunched)
- Country: Netherlands
- Language: Dutch
- Website: eppostripblad.nl

Eppo is a Dutch comics magazine named after the protagonist of the back-page-gags. It was the result of the merging of the magazines Pep and Sjors. Eppo ran as a weekly magazine from 1975 to 1988; it was revived in 2009 as a fortnightly magazine.

== History and profile ==
The first thirteen issues of Eppo appeared in the last three months of 1975 and introduced comics such as Storm, Roel Dijkstra, Franka (originally a character from the Pep-featured Het Misdaadmuseum) and Sjors & Sjimmie. All of them became staples of the magazine, alongside Eppo himself.

In 1985, after more than 500 issues, Eppo merged with Wordt Vervolgd, a television program devoted to comics, cartoons, and related topics. Early 1988 the magazine became the bi-weekly Sjors & Sjimmie. The first years were still successful, but in 1994 the name was shortened to Sjosji in an attempt to reach a younger generation. It backfired, and by the end of the decade Sjosji ceased publication.

In February 2009 the magazine was revived as Eppo and taken back to heart by its original readers. Household names as Storm, Franka, Agent 327, and Eppo go hand in hand with new comics such as Elsje, Eugene and Dating for Geeks.

== Comics published in the magazine ==
Comics published in the magazine are as follows:

=== House comics ===
- Agent 327
- Eppo
- De Familie Doorzon
- De Familie Fortuin
- DirkJan
- Franka
- De Generaal
- Heinz
- Grote Pyr
- Roel en zijn Beestenboel
- Sjors & Sjimmie
- Storm
- Tom Carbon

=== Foreign import ===
- Astérix
- Blueberry
- Lucky Luke
