= The Trigan Empire =

Science fiction comic series by Mike Butterworth

- Tales From the Trigan Empire, 1989
- Created by: Mike Butterworth; Don Lawrence

Publication information
- Publisher: ^{UK} Fleetway Rebellion Developments; ^{NL} Big Balloon Uitgeverij Oberon
- Formats: Original material for the series has been published as a strip in the comics anthology(s) Ranger; Look and Learn.
- Original language: English
- Genre: Science fiction
- Publication date: September 1965 – April 1982

Creative team
- Writer(s): Mike Butterworth; Ken Roscoe
- Artist(s): Don Lawrence; Ernest Ratcliff; Ron Embleton; Miguel Quesada; Philip Corke; Oliver Frey; Gerry Wood

Reprints
- Collected editions
- The Look and Learn Book of the Trigan Empire (1973): ISBN 0-85037-104-X
- The Trigan Empire (1978): ISBN 0-600-38788-7
- Tales from the Trigan Empire (1989): ISBN 0-948248-95-5
- The Trigan Empire (The Don Lawrence Collection) (2004-2008) (12 vols): ISBN 90-73508-54-1
- The Rise and Fall of The Trigan Empire (2020- ): ISBN 978-1-78108-755-8

The Rise and Fall of the Trigan Empire, later shortened to The Trigan Empire, was a science fiction adventure comic series written mainly by Mike Butterworth with artwork (initially watercolours, later gouache) by Don Lawrence, among others. The series, which ran in British magazines from 1965 to 1982, told the story of an alien culture in which futuristic technology, such as antigravity vehicles and energy weapons, blended with architecture, dress, and customs based on those of ancient civilizations, the most obvious being those of ancient Greece and Rome. The stories revolved around a heroic leader who defended his empire from constant threats from both outside and within. A new original graphic novel revival was announced in 2025 and scheduled to debut in 2026.

== Overview ==
The stories told of events on the Earth-like planet of Elekton, a world inhabited by various humanoid societies. The stories, influenced by mythology, featured societies based on the cultures of ancient history. Chief among these was the Trigan Empire itself, modelled on Ancient Greece and Rome. This similarity extended to Trigan City, the capital built on five hills, in a similar fashion to the seven hills of Rome. The Trigans' clothing was like that of ancient Romans, with many of the populace dressed in toga-like garments or, in the case of the soldiery, in Greek- or Roman-style armour. A similar likeness could be drawn with Hericon, a chief rival in power to the Trigans, which had elements of the Byzantine and Persian empires.

== Creation ==
According to Butterworth: "The original Impetus was from that veritable genius Leonard Matthews, then my senior group editor when I was editing Sun and Comet. He threw the first introductory script at me and told me to take it from there. He had no idea where to further it but he knew where to look for a guy who did."

== Plot ==
The framing narrative presented in the first strip showed an alien "cosmo-craft" crashing into a swamp in Florida, along with the bodies of the crew and many volumes in an indecipherable language. At an advanced age, a scientist who has spent decades studying the books from the spaceship in an effort to translate them, does so at last, with the aid of a computer.

The Trigans began as a nomadic tribe called the Vorgs, with no technology, initially under the leadership of three brothers, Trigo, Brag and Klud. Trigo persuades his more conservative brothers that in the face of changing events, namely the ambitions of the Lokan Empire, they must settle. The fledgling Trigan nation is established via a merger of the nomadic Vorgs and the technically advanced people of Tharv (who arrived as refugees to the Plains of Vorg after they were defeated by the Lokans) under the leadership of Trigo, with swords, lances, and Roman-style clothing, but with ray guns, aircraft, and a high-tech navy. In a later story, the Trigans create a rocketship in months to fly to one of Elekton's moons. Several of the other civilizations show a similar blend of low and high tech.

== Publication history ==
The strip debuted in the first issue of the British magazine Ranger in September 1965 and then in the British Look and Learn magazine from issue #232 (June 1966) when the two titles merged after the 40th issue of Ranger. Both titles were weekly educational magazines designed for children; although mainly filled with educational features on life, history, science and technology, both contained a small comic strip section in each issue.

The series ran in Look and Learn until the title ceased publication with issue #1049, in April 1982, comprising a run of 854 issues in total, divided between the two magazines.

In addition to the weekly strips, a few Trigan Empire stories were published in Ranger annuals and a Vulcan summer special.

In 1975–1976, the series thus far was reprinted in its original sequential order in Vulcan, a weekly glossy-format comic, which reprinted the strips in full colour, though edited and resized, alongside colour reprints of other British comics serials of the 1960s.

There were a number of reprints in hardback format. In 1978, Hamlyn Publishing in the United Kingdom printed a hardback collection of early Trigan Empire stories titled The Trigan Empire; this was reprinted in the United States by Chartwell Publishing. Other than Lawrence's signature being visible on the title-page art, neither he nor Butterworth was credited in this edition. A later collection, also hardback, was printed by Hawk Publishing in 1989 as Tales from the Trigan Empire. Both the Hamlyn and the Hawk books presented edited versions of the stories; most notably, in the Hawk book some entire pages were omitted. Several stories were repeated in both collections, but The Trigan Empire collection has the earliest, showing the establishment of the Empire.

In 2004–2008, the stories drawn by Don Lawrence were reprinted by the Don Lawrence Collection in luxury hardback limited editions. These editions contain the complete stories, without any of the omissions that were a feature of the earlier reprints, particularly the Hawk Publishing book. They were not reprinted from Look and Learn; in many cases they were printed from the original artwork and used revised fonts to make the text easier to read.

The rights to The Trigan Empire were bought by Rebellion Developments in 2018. Initial plans were to publish the sequence drawn by Lawrence in four volumes; a first volume appeared in March 2020, a second in December 2020, and a third in July 2021. The second and third volumes included stories from the 1960s and early 1970s not illustrated by Lawrence, raising the question whether serials drawn by other artists during the later years of the strip would be included in subsequent volumes. The fourth volume (2022) similarly included serials from the mid-1970s drawn by artists other than Lawrence. A fifth volume (2023) completed Lawrence's own sequence in order of original publication and also included six of the ten stories illustrated by Oliver Frey. A sixth volume (2025) included the last five stories written by Mike Butterworth and the last four stories illustrated by Frey before Kevin Roscoe and Gerry Wood took over writing and illustrating respectively. A seventh volume containing the final stories by Roscoe and Wood is expected in November 2026.

=== 2026 Revival ===
In 2025, Rebellion announced the first new Trigan Empire stories in more than forty years. These were written by Michael Carroll and illustrated by Tom Foster. Set several decades after the empire’s original rise, the new storyline is intended to depict its period of decline rather than expansion. The project is planned as a graphic novel–only release, with the first volume scheduled for publication in May 2026. The initial release has been designated as Volume 1, although Rebellion has not announced how many volumes are intended.

== Characters ==
- Trigo. The founder of the Empire. With his two brothers Brag and Klud, he was the leader of a tribe of Vorgs. At this time the Lokan Empire was instituting a military buildup with an intent to take over the entire planet. Trigo had a vision of a nation where the Vorg tribesmen could give up their nomadic existence and band together in civilization. He knew that the Lokans were intent on conquest and felt that if the Vorgs were not united they would become extinct. When his plans to build a city on the plains of Vorg fail, there is a fateful meeting with refugees from the nation of Tharv which has been attacked by Loka. Among these refugees is the architect Peric who agrees to help Trigo with his plans as long as his people are allowed to stay there. Although Brag was willing to give up his claims of leadership to his people to allow Trigo to become sole ruler, his brother Klud had no such plan and tried to assassinate Trigo. In the years to come, Trigo will institute a treaty with Hericon, the other great power on the planet of Elekton, be crowned first Emperor of the Trigan Empire, and face many other threats to himself and his empire.
- Brag. Trigo's brother, and one of three triplets. He often called slow, if not stupid. He is well-meaning and faithful to his brother. Despite living in relative luxury with all the benefits of more advanced technology there are times that Brag wishes he was back to his life as a simple Vorg huntsman. He keeps himself in good physical shape despite growing older. He can be manipulated by those cleverer than himself.
- Janno. The son of Brag and nephew to Emperor Trigo. A courageous individual, he has a natural aptitude as an aircraft pilot. He is friends with Keren, the son of Chief Imbala of Daveli, and Roffa from the City State of Ellul. Janno is regularly a representative of Trigan City, whether it is as an athlete in the olympic style games, or as a diplomatic envoy. In some stories it is mentioned in a short dialogue that Trigo had a thought to name him his successor.
- Peric. Chief architect of the destroyed nation of Tharv, Peric with his daughter and other Tharvish refugees made their way into the desert of Vorg after the destruction of the main city of Tharv by Lokan forces. Peric is of advanced years but remains fairly healthy. He is regarded as the greatest living architect on Elekton and an accomplished engineer and scientist. He is often behind many of the great accomplishments of the Empire.
- Salvia. The daughter of Peric and is the most visible female character in the series. Salvia is skilled in Tharvish medicine, a trait that would serve the Empire well on a number of occasions, whether it is saving Trigo from potent poison inflicted by Trigo's brother, or the life of Keren, son of Chief Imbala of Daveli, or the life of the Chieftainess of the Tamaz desert warriors.
- Keren. Janno's best friend and son of Chief Imbala of Daveli whose culture closely mirrors that of Central American Mesoamerican civilisations. Keren was introduced in the second tale of the series, "Crash in the Jungle". Keren and his people are shown as being either blue skinned or dark green, depending on the printing.
- Lady Ursa. Sister of King Kassar of Hericon and probably the next most visible female character of the series. She and Trigo were married, as guarantee for the ratification of a trade treaty, at the start of the story titled "War With Hericon". They would have triplet sons, although two would later be killed.
- King Zorth. The tyrannical leader of Loka whose obsession with planet conquest (especially that of the Trigan Empire) ends only when he is overthrown by his own people. The Lokans are given an olive complexion and appear somewhat Asiatic.

== Creative team ==
From its start in 1965 until 1976, the series was mainly created by writer Mike Butterworth and artist Don Lawrence. For stories in two Ranger annuals and some fill-in serials, other artists made a contribution. During a sabbatical, Philip Corke replaced Don Lawrence. From mid-1976 until the end of 1977, Oliver Frey was the artist. In 1978, Ken Roscoe took over the writing, and concluded the series with artist Gerry Wood.

=== Writers ===
- Mike Butterworth (1965–1977)
- Ken Roscoe (1978–1982)

=== Artists ===
- Don Lawrence (1965–1974, 1975–1976)
- Ernest Ratcliff (1966)
- Ron Embleton (1967, 1969)
- Miguel Quesada (1972, 1974). His work was for a long time incorrectly attributed to Ramon Sola
- Philip Corke (1974–1975)
- Oliver Frey (1976–1977)
- Gerry Wood (1977–1982)

== Tales ==
Although there were no official titles for most of the stories, the following table lists the commonly used names in order of first publication.

#	Title	Writer	Artist	Pages	First publication
1	"Victory for the Trigans"	MB	DL	40	from Ranger #1 - 18-09-1965 until #20 - 29-01-1966
2	"Crash in the Jungle"	MB	DL	6	from Ranger #21 - 05-02-1966 until #23 - 19-02-1966
3	"Elekton in Danger", a.k.a. "The Falling Moon"	MB	DL	28	from Ranger #24 - 26-02-1966 until #37 - 28-05-1966
4	"The Invaders from Gallas"	MB	DL	18	from Ranger #38 - 04-06-1966 until #40 - 18-06-1966 and from Look and Learn #232 - 25-06-1966 until #237 - 30-07-1966
5	"The Land of No Return", a.k.a. "The Legend of Hellas"	MB	DL	10	from Look and Learn #238 - 06-08-1966 until #242 - 03-09-1966
6	"The Wise Man of Vorg"	MB?	ER	8	Ranger Book 1967 (available from 08-10-1966)
7	"The Lokan Conspiracy", a.k.a. "The Revolt of the Lokans"	MB	DL	26	from Look and Learn #243 - 10-09-1966 until #255 - 03-12-1966
8	"War with Hericon", a.k.a. "Truce with Hericon"	MB	DL	18	from Look and Learn #256 - 10-12-1966 until #264 - 04-02-1967
9	"Revolution in Zabriz"	MB	DL	18	from Look and Learn #265 - 11-02-1967 until #273 - 08-04-1967
10	"The Lokan Invasion", a.k.a. "Vannu's Poison"	MB	DL	12	from Look and Learn #274 - 15-04-1967 until #279 - 20-05-1967
11	"The Revenge of Darak"	MB	DL	22	from Look and Learn #280 - 27-05-1967 until #290 - 05-08-1967
12	"The Three Aliens", a.k.a. "The Alien Invasion"	MB	DL	14	from Look and Learn #291 - 12-08-1967 until #297 - 23-09-1967
13	"The Brief Reign of Sennos the First"	MB?	RE	8	Ranger Book 1968 (available from 28-10-1967)
14	"The Reign of Thara", a.k.a. "Battle for Trigan City"	MB	DL	38	from Look and Learn #298 - 30-09-1967 until #316 - 03-02-1968
15	"Voyage to the Moon Bolus", a.k.a. "The Invasion of Bolus"	MB	DL	30	from Look and Learn #317 - 10-02-1968 until #331 - 18-05-1968
16	"The Three Princes"	MB	DL	62	from Look and Learn #332 - 25-05-1968 until #362 - 21-12-1968
17	"Poison from Outer Space", a.k.a. "The Alien Dust"	MB	DL	16	from Look and Learn #363 - 28-12-1968 until #370 - 15-02-1969
18	"The Lost City"	MB	DL	24	from Look and Learn #371 - 22-02-1969 until #382 - 10-05-1969
19	"The Terror of Mount Spyx"	MB	RE	16	from Look and Learn #383 - 17-05-1969 until #390 - 05-07-1969
20	"The Invisibility Ray", a.k.a. "False Accusation"	MB	DL	14	from Look and Learn #391 - 12-07-1969 until #397 - 23-08-1969
21	"The Deadly Formula", a.k.a. "The Ultimate Weapon"	MB	DL	10	from Look and Learn #398 - 30-08-1969 until #402 - 27-09-1969
22	"The Tyrant"	MB	DL	26	from Look and Learn #403 - 04-10-1969 until #415 - 27-12-1969
23	"The Red Death"	MB	DL	18	from Look and Learn #416 - 03-01-1970 until #424 - 28-02-1970
24	"The Puppet Emperor"	MB	DL	28	from Look and Learn #425 - 07-03-1970 until #438 - 06-06-1970
25	"Trigo's Five Tasks", a.k.a. "The Five Labours of Trigo"	MB	DL	46	from Look and Learn #439 - 13-06-1970 until #461 - 14-11-1970
26	"The Menace From The Sea", a.k.a. "The Menace from the Deep" †	MB	DL	24	from Look and Learn #461 - 14-11-1970 until #473 - 06-02-1971
27	"The Giant Rallus", a.k.a. "The Rallu Invasion"	MB	DL	14	from Look and Learn #474 - 13-02-1971 until #480 - 27-03-1971
28	"The City of Jewels" †	MB	DL	16	from Look and Learn #480 - 27-03-1971 until #488 - 22-05-1971
29	"The Imposter", a.k.a. "The Unscrupulous Servant"	MB	DL	16	from Look and Learn #489 - 29-05-1971 until #496 - 17-07-1971
30	"The Duplication Machine", a.k.a. "The Duplicator" †	MB	DL	18	from Look and Learn #496 - 17-07-1971 until #505 - 18-09-1971
31	"The Masked Raiders", a.k.a. "Revenge of a Friend"	MB	DL	22	from Look and Learn #506 - 25-09-1971 until #516 - 04-12-1971
32	"The Prisoner of Zerss" †	MB	DL	20	from Look and Learn #516 - 04-12-1971 until #526 - 12-02-1972
33	"The Miniature Killers of Zelph", a.k.a. "The Black Duke"	MB	DL	16	from Look and Learn #527 - 19-02-1972 until #534 - 08-04-1972
34	"The Hypnotist", a.k.a. "Doran the Hypnotist"	MB	MQ	12	from Look and Learn #535 - 15-04-1972 until #540 - 20-05-1972
35	"The Wish Fulfiller", a.k.a. "The Black Box"	MB	DL	18	from Look and Learn #541 - 27-05-1972 until #549 - 22-07-1972
36	"The Fiendish Experiment", a.k.a. "The Hydro Man"	MB	DL	18	from Look and Learn #550 - 29-07-1972 until #558 - 23-09-1972
37	"The Curse of King Yutta"	MB	DL	18	from Look and Learn #559 - 30-09-1972 until #567 - 25-11-1972
38	"The Lost Years"	MB	DL	22	from Look and Learn #568 - 02-12-1972 until #578 - 10-02-1973
39	"Journey to Orcadia", a.k.a. "Atomic Disaster!"	MB	DL	18	from Look and Learn #579 - 17-02-1973 until #587 - 14-04-1973
40	"The Secret of Castle Doum"	MB	DL	18	from Look and Learn #588 - 21-04-1973 until #596 - 16-06-1973
41	"The House of the Five Moons"	MB	DL	18	from Look and Learn #597 - 23-06-1973 until #605 - 18-08-1973
42	"A National Emergency", a.k.a. "The Outlaw Planet"	MB	DL	10	from Look and Learn #606 - 25-08-1973 until #610 - 22-09-1973
43	"The Palace of Peril", a.k.a. "The Glass Palace"	MB	DL	4	from Look and Learn #611 - 29-09-1973 until #612 - 06-10-1973
44	"Evil from Outer Space", a.k.a. "Terror from Tarron"	MB	DL	16	from Look and Learn #613 - 13-10-1973 until #620 - 01-12-1973
45	"The Curse of the Sun Worshippers", a.k.a. "The Sun Worshippers"	MB	DL	18	from Look and Learn #621 - 08-12-1973 until #629 - 02-02-1974
46	"The Zootha Vorgs", a.k.a. "The Rogue Planet"	MB	MQ	10	from Look and Learn #630 - 09-02-1974 until #634 - 09-03-1974
47	"The Sea Creatures", a.k.a. "The Melting Ice Caps"	MB	PC	20	from Look and Learn #635 - 16-03-1974 until #644 - 18-05-1974
48	"The Youth Serum", a.k.a. "The Elixir of Eternal Youth"	MB	PC	16	from Look and Learn #645 - 25-05-1974 until #652 - 13-07-1974
49	"The Assassin", a.k.a. "Zith the Assassin"	MB	PC	16	from Look and Learn #653 - 20-07-1974 until #660 - 07-09-1974
50	"The Deadly Seeds", a.k.a. "The Alien Seeds"	MB	PC	14	from Look and Learn #661 - 14-09-1974 until #667 - 26-10-1974
51	"Emperor Z", a.k.a. "The Stone of Vorg"	MB	PC	20	from Look and Learn #668 - 02-11-1974 until #677 - 04-01-1975
52	"The Heat Controller", a.k.a. "The Weather Controller"	MB	PC	16	from Look and Learn #682 - 08-02-1975 until #689 - 29-03-1975
53	"The Time Traveller", a.k.a. "The Man from the Future"	MB	DL	18	from Look and Learn #690 - 05-04-1975 until #698 - 31-05-1975
54	"The Rocketeer", a.k.a. "The Mission of Lukaz Rann"	MB	DL	20	from Look and Learn #699 - 07-06-1975 until #708 - 09-08-1975
55	"The Convicts", a.k.a. "Torga's Mind Controller"	MB	DL	18	from Look and Learn #709 - 16-08-1975 until #717 - 11-10-1975
56	"The Gambler", a.k.a. "Nastor, the Faith Healer"	MB	DL	12	from Look and Learn #718 - 18-10-1975 until #723 - 22-11-1975
57	"The Ultimate Collection", a.k.a. "The Millionaire"	MB	DL	16	from Look and Learn #724 - 29-11-1975 until #731 - 17-01-1976
58	"The Dryaks", a.k.a. "The Green Smog"	MB	DL	16	from Look and Learn #732 - 24-01-1976 until #739 - 13-03-1976
59	"The Nobes", a.k.a. "The Lost Valley"	MB	DL	16	from Look and Learn #740 - 20-03-1976 until #747 - 08-05-1976
60	"Atomic Fallout", a.k.a. "The Fallout Menace"	MB	DL	10	from Look and Learn #748 - 15-05-1976 until #752 - 12-06-1976
61	"Vengeance!", a.k.a. "The Disappeared", a.k.a. "The Satellite Mystery"	MB	OF	16	from Look and Learn #753 - 19-06-1976 until #760 - 07-08-1976
62	"The Zallus", a.k.a. "The Labours of Janno", a.k.a. "Janno's Desert Ordeal"	MB	OF	16	from Look and Learn #761 - 14-08-1976 until #768 - 02-10-1976
63	"The Street Sweeper", a.k.a. "Fortune and Consequences", a.k.a. "The Deception of Krusi"	MB	OF	16	from Look and Learn #769 - 09-10-1976 until #776 - 27-11-1976
64	"The Time Machine", a.k.a. "Janno's 'Out-of-Time' Mind"	MB	OF	10	from Look and Learn #777 - 04-12-1976 until #781 - 01-01-1977
65	"The Frozen People", a.k.a. "Sedda's Plot"	MB	OF	20	from Look and Learn #782 - 08-01-1977 until #791 - 12-03-1977
66	"Abdication", a.k.a. "The Imperial Walkabout"	MB	OF	16	from Look and Learn #792 - 19-03-1977 until #799 - 07-05-1977
67	"Mazaratto's Universal Elixir", a.k.a. "Dr. Mazaratto's Elixir"	MB	OF	16	from Look and Learn #800 - 14-05-1977 until #807 - 02-07-1977
68	"The Digger", a.k.a. "The Ghost in the Machine"	MB	OF	16	from Look and Learn #808 - 09-07-1977 until #815 - 27-08-1977
69	"The Stolen Plans"	MB	OF	8	from Look and Learn #816 - 03-09-1977 until #819 - 24-09-1977
70	"The Curse of Zonn", a.k.a. "The Manipulators of Chaos"	MB	GW	12	from Look and Learn #820 - 01-10-1977 until #825 - 05-11-1977
71	"Battle for Survival", a.k.a. "Cato Attacks"	MB?	OF	16	from Look and Learn #826 - 12-11-1977 until #833 - 31-12-1977
72	"Brinka, Intergalactic Special Agent," including "The Killer"	KR	GW	20	from Look and Learn #834 - 07-01-1978 until #843 - 11-03-1978
73	"Junix's Claim to the Throne", a.k.a. "The Rival", a.k.a. "Eruption!"	KR	GW	16	from Look and Learn #844 - 18-03-1978 until #851 - 06-05-1978
74	"The Zondan Affair", a.k.a. "The Trigonium Thieves"	KR	GW	16	from Look and Learn #852 - 13-05-1978 until #859 - 01-07-1978
75	"The Treachery of Marshal Hipzon", a.k.a. "Chase For a Traitor"	KR	GW	12	from Look and Learn #860 - 08-07-1978 until #865 - 12-08-1978
76	"The Voyage of the Perici", a.k.a. "Sub Mission"	KR	GW	12	from Look and Learn #878 - 11-11-1978 until #883 - 16-12-1978
77	"The Poisoning of Trigan's Youth", a.k.a. "The Flowers of Forgetfulness"	KR	GW	28	from Look and Learn #884 - 23-12-1978 until #897 - 31-03-1979
78	"Civil War in Daveli", a.k.a. "Rebellion in Daveli"	KR	GW	28	from Look and Learn #898 - 07-04-1979 until #911 - 07-07-1979
79	"The Hericon/Nivatian Conflict", a.k.a. "A Tragic Misunderstanding", a.k.a. "Ice upon Hericon"	KR	GW	24	from Look and Learn #912 - 14-07-1979 until #923 - 29-09-1979
80	"The Zabriz Conspiracy"	KR	GW	26	from Look and Learn #932 - 01-12-1979 until #944 - 23-02-1980
81	"Trigan's Deadly Peril", a.k.a. "Shipwreck Peril"	KR	GW	22	from Look and Learn #945 - 01-03-1980 until #955 - 28-06-1980
82	"The Skorpiads"	KR	GW	28	from Look and Learn #956 - 05-07-1980 until #969 - 04-10-1980
83	"The Zolt Exodus"	KR	GW	32	from Look and Learn #983 - 10-01-1981 until #998 - 25-04-1981
84	"Terror of the Skorpiads"	KR	GW	28	from Look and Learn #999 - 02-05-1981 until #1012 - 01-08-1981
85	"Search Mission", a.k.a. "The Quest of Fidelius"	KR	GW	30	from Look and Learn #1013 - 08-08-1981 until #1027 - 14-11-1981
86	"Alien Mission", a.k.a. "Bad Moon Arising"	KR	GW	24	from Look and Learn #1028 - 21-11-1981 until #1039 - 06-02-1982
87	"Mercy Mission", a.k.a. "Desert King"	KR	GW	20	from Look and Learn #1040 - 13-02-1982 until #1049 - 17-04-1982

Stories marked † began in the same issue as the final episode of the preceding story. Not included in this table is the text story "They Came From out of the Night" with illustrations by Don Lawrence. This anonymous story, also known as "The Underworld of Vuldar", was published in a Vulcan Holiday Special on July 1, 1976.

== Collected editions ==
The stories have been collected into volumes a number of times:

- The Look and Learn Book of the Trigan Empire (70 pages, IPC/Fleetway, 1973, ISBN 0-85037-104-X)
- The Trigan Empire (192 pages, Hamlyn, October 1978, ISBN 0-600-38788-7)
- Tales from the Trigan Empire (160 pages, Hawk Books, 1989, ISBN 0-948248-95-5)
- The Trigan Empire (The Don Lawrence Collection, hardcover):
  - The Invaders from Gallas (130 pages, August 2008, ISBN 90-88860-25-4)
  - Revolution in Zabriz (122 pages, March 2007, ISBN 90-73508-91-6)
  - The Reign of Thara (98 pages, November 2006, ISBN 90-73508-84-3)
  - The Three Princes (98 pages, March 2006, ISBN 90-73508-78-9)
  - The Red Death (114 pages, April 2008, ISBN 90-73508-96-7)
  - The Puppet Emperor (114 pages, December 2007, ISBN 90-73508-93-2)
  - The Rallu Invasion (96 pages, August 2006, ISBN 90-73508-82-7)
  - The Prisoner of Zerss (98 pages, March 2004, ISBN 90-73508-54-1)
  - The Curse of King Yutta (98 pages, October 2005, ISBN 90-73508-66-5)
  - The House of the Five Moons (94 pages, March 2005, ISBN 90-73508-64-9)
  - The Sun Worshippers (106 pages, October 2004, ISBN 90-73508-62-2)
  - The Green Smog (112 pages, November 2008, ISBN 90-88860-27-0)
- The Rise and Fall of the Trigan Empire (Rebellion)
  - Volume I (304 pages, March 2020, ISBN 978-1-78108-755-8) comprises 13 stories published from September 18, 1965 to May 18, 1968
  - Volume II (288 pages, December 2020, ISBN 978-1-78108-775-6) comprises 11 stories published from May 25, 1968 to November 14, 1970
  - Volume III (256 pages, July 2021, ISBN 978-1-78108-932-3) comprises 13 stories published from November 21, 1970 to February 10, 1973
  - Volume IV (240 pages, August 2022, ISBN 978-1-78618-564-8) comprises 14 stories published from February 17, 1973 to March 29, 1975 and one story published in Ranger Book 1967
  - Volume V (240 pages, October 2023, ISBN 978-1-83786-009-8) comprises 14 stories published from April 5, 1975 to May 7, 1977
  - Volume VI (240 pages, July 2025, ISBN 978-1-83786-534-5) comprises 13 stories published from May 14, 1977 to September 29, 1979
  - Volume VII (240 pages, November 2026, ISBN 978-1-83786-850-6) expected to comprise stories published from December 1, 1979 to April 17, 1982, completing the original run of stories

== Adaptations ==
Two radio plays were produced in Dutch, "The Mysterious Meteorite" and "Lumbwabwa the Usurper".

Movie rights for a feature film based on the strip were optioned in 2009. In December 2011 it was revealed that a script existed and that the film's producers were holding meetings in England to find a director.

Time Inc UK had a TV series in development in 2017 with 10 episodes written but production halted when Rebellion Developments acquired the rights in 2018.

== See also ==
- Storm (Don Lawrence)
