= Jan Steeman =

Dutch comics artist (1933–2018)

Jan Steeman (23 May 1933 – 24 January 2018) was a Dutch comics artist, best known for his association football comic Roel Dijkstra and Noortje, a comic strip about a bumbling teenage girl published in Tina. The latter runs for more than 40 years in succession, making it the longest-running Dutch comic strip by the self-same artist. His scriptwriter for Noortje was Patty Klein while his son Lucas has taken over the comic. Steeman won the 2005 Stripschapprijs. He died on 24 January 2018 from kidney failure.
