= Sjors & Sjimmie =

Dutch comic strip

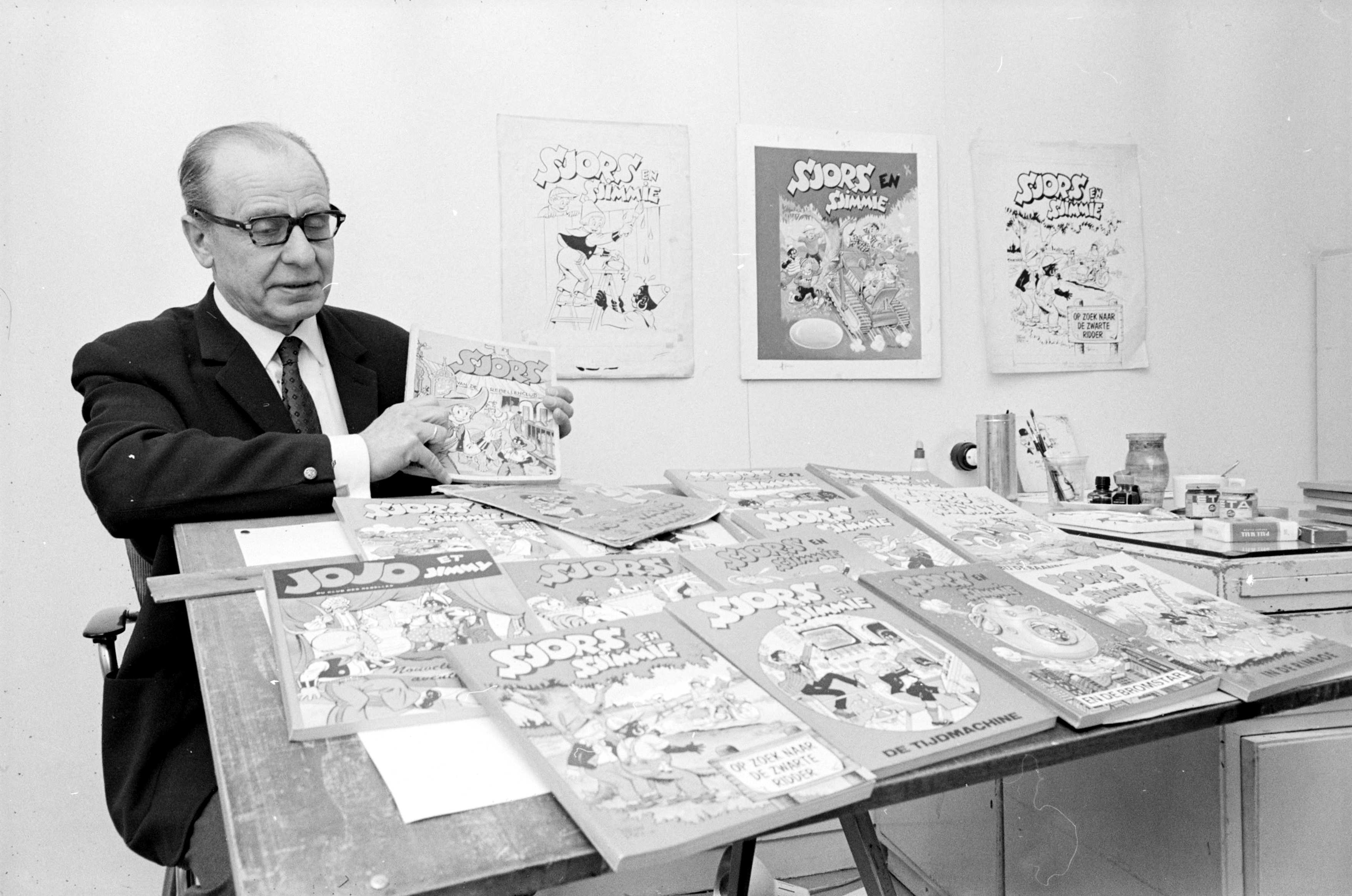
- Sjors & Sjimmie comics and author in 1970

Publication information
- Publisher: Oberon (Netherlands)
- First appearance: 1938; Sjors
- Created by: Frans Piët

In-story information
- Supporting character of: Sjors; Sjimmie; The Colonel; Sally; Dikkie

Sjors & Sjimmie (George & Jimmy) is a Dutch adaptation of the comic strip Winnie Winkle, specifically the character Perry Winkle from that strip. The difference between the American original and the Dutch adaptation is that Sjors (Perry) forms a duo with African-born Sjimmie. They are raised by Sally and the Colonel. The Colonel regularly finds himself on the receiving end of their pranks. In return Sjors & Sjimmie are outsmarted by their scheming classmate Dikkie, although they manage to stay the best of friends.

== Publication history ==
=== Early years ===
The popularity of the newspaper strip Buster Brown (debuting in 1902) spawned many imitators, including the Perry Winkle character (Winnie's adopted younger brother) in Martin Branner's long-running strip Winnie Winkle (debuting in 1920). Perry's adventures were translated and published in Dutch newspapers; and in 1938 given a Dutch-made version (Sjors en de Rebellenclub by Frans Piët) after the original US strip shifted focus back on to Perry's sister Winnie.

After the strip took a hiatus during World War II, the protagonist Sjors found a companion in Sjimmie, an African boy who was part of the visiting circus. Sjimmie was originally portrayed in blackface stereotypical ways such as speaking in broken language. In 1969 Jan Kruis took over the comic from the retired Frans Piët; he reinvented Sjimmie as a normal-looking, properly speaking teenager, and introduced the Colonel (Sally's father) as a grumpy war-veteran.

Kruis produced two 44-page stories, but eventually chose to work on his one-page comic Jack, Jacky and the Juniors in which Sjors & Sjimmie made one cameo appearance. Jan Steeman continued Sjors & Sjimmie during the first half of the 1970s.

=== 1975-99; the Wiroja-years ===
In 1975 the Sjors and Pep magazines merged into Eppo; Sjors & Sjimmie were re-invented as one-page gags drawn by Robert van der Kroft. The initial response was tepid, but things improved when scriptwriter Patty Klein was replaced by the duo of Wilbert Plijnaar and Jan van Die. Collectively known as the Wirojas, the threesome of van der Kroft, Plijnaar, and van Die turned Sjors & Sjimmie into one of Eppo's most popular features.

During the 1980s Sjors & Sjimmie grew into teenagers pursuing like-minded interests (soccer, computer games) and chasing girls with varying results, while modern-day trends, celebrities, and political developments were ridiculed. For example; Sjors & Sjimmie were huge fans of "Michael Claxon" ("claxon" meaning "car horn" in Dutch) and "Madomma" ("dom" meaning "dumb" or "stupid" in Dutch), and preferred off-time lunches at McMickey's over mundane cheese-sandwiches.

=== Sjors & Sjimmie magazine ===
Sjors & Sjimmie
- Categories: Comics magazine
- Frequency: biweekly
- Publisher: Oberon
- First issue: 1988
- Final issue: 1999
- Country: Netherlands
- Language: Dutch

In 1988 Eppo magazine was renamed Sjors & Sjimmie after its most successful comic. It lasted until 1999 and contained multi-page stories besides the regular one-pagers. The Wirojas couldn't cope with the amount of work, which was outsourced to a Spanish art studio; the Wirojas stayed on hand for cover designs and quality control whilst producing the gag strip Claire for the women's magazine Flair.

The first years of "Sjors & Sjimmie" were still successful, but in 1994 the name was shortened to Sjosji in an unsuccessful attempt to reach a younger generation. In 1999 Sjosji ceased publication.

=== Cancellation and possible comeback ===
The magazine was revived in 2009 as Eppo, but due to legal issues Sjors & Sjimmie were not included. Robert van der Kroft worked on Claire-gags with Jan van Die and Evert Geradts. The latter replaced Wilbert Plijnaar, who moved to Los Angeles in 1995 where he enjoyed a successful career in animation and continues to live. In 2019, the Wiroja's reunited to produce new gags for quarterly magazine StripGlossy.

== In other media ==
- Sjors van de Rebellenclub met vacantie (1940)
- Seven live-action Sjors & Sjimmie movies were made between 1955 and 1977 by Henk van der Linden.
  - Sjors van de Rebellenclub (1955)
  - Sjors en Sjimmie op het Pirateneiland (1962)
  - Sjors en Sjimmie en de Gorilla (1966)
  - Sjors en Sjimmie in het Land der Reuzen (1968)
  - Sjors en Sjimmie en de Toverring (1971)
  - Sjors en Sjimmie en de Rebellen (1972)
  - Sjors en Sjimmie en het Zwaard van Krijn (1977)
    An anticipated eighth movie was planned, but eventually cancelled. It would have starred comedians Paul de Leeuw and Eric van Sauers as Sjors & Sjimmie in their forties.

== Artists ==
- Hans Ducro
- Frans Piët
- Jan Kruis
- Jan Steeman
- Robert van der Kroft
- Carol Voges
