= Dutch comics =

Comic originating in the Netherlands

- Earliest publications: 1858
- Languages: Dutch

Related articles

Dutch comics are comics made in the Netherlands. In Dutch the most common designation for the whole art form is "strip" (short for "stripverhaal" – "strip story" – , though the old-fashioned expression "beeldverhaal" – "picture story" – remains utilized on occasion, particularly in formal texts and treatises on the subject matter), whereas the word "comic" is used for the (usually) soft cover American style comic book format and its derivatives, typically containing translated US superhero material. This use in colloquial Dutch of the adopted English word for that format can cause confusion in English language texts.

Since the Netherlands shares the same language with Flanders, many Belgian comics and Franco-Belgian comics have also been published there, the latter in translation. But while French language publications are habitually translated into Dutch/Flemish, the opposite is not true: Dutch/Flemish publications are less commonly translated into French, possibly due to the different cultures in Flanders/Netherlands and Wallonia/France. Likewise and though available, Flemish comic books are not doing that well in the Netherlands and vice versa, save for some notable exceptions, especially the Willy Vandersteen creation Suske en Wiske (Spike and Suzy) which is as popular in the Netherlands as it is in native Flanders. Concurrently, the cultural idiosyncrasies contained within Dutch/Flemish comics also mean that these comics have seen far fewer translations into other languages – excepting French to some extent, due to the bi-lingual nature of Belgium – than their French-language counterparts have.

== History ==
=== Earliest examples ===
Dutch comics, like many European comics, have their prototypical forerunners in the form of medieval manuscripts, which often used sequential pictures accompanied by text, or sometimes even used speech balloons for captions. The "mannekesprenten" ("little men drawings") are also an early forerunner, usually depicting the lives of Christian saints or fables. In the 19th century several Dutch political cartoonists made use of sequential pictures, caricatures and humoristic situations that can be seen as the predecessors of comics. In 1858 the Swiss comic strip Monsieur Cryptogame by Rodolphe Töpffer was translated in Dutch by J.J.A. Gouverneur as Meester Prikkebeen (Mister Prick-a-leg) and was a huge success in the Netherlands. It was published in the text comics format, with written text published underneath the pictures. This type of comics would remain the dominant form in the Netherlands until the mid-1960s, because Dutch moral guardians felt that these comics at least motivated children to actually read written sentences instead of merely looking at the pictures. While translations of comic strips remained popular no actual Dutch comics artists emerged until the late 19th century. One of the earliest artists to be considered a comic artist was Jan Linse. He drew several humoristic scenes in sequential form and wrote the text beneath the pictures. Another pioneer was Daniël Hoeksema, who drew a spin-off series inspired by Monsieur Cryptogame called De Neef van Prikkebeen (1909) (Prikkebeen's Cousin). However, most Dutch comics during the 1880s, 1890s, 1900s and 1910s were satirical illustrations and cartoons about Dutch politics and society or moralistic stories for the youth.

=== Interbellum: The true beginnings of Dutch comics ===
The first proper Dutch comic strips were published after World War I. Many Dutch newspapers and magazines now imported translations of popular American, British and French comics, such as The Katzenjammer Kids (translated as Jongens van Stavast), Rupert Bear (translated as Bruintje Beer), Perry and the Rinkydinks (translated as Sjors), Mickey Mouse (translated as Mikkie Muis) and Billy Bimbo and Peter Porker (translated as Jopie Slim and Dikkie Bigmans) which were all immediate successes. As a result, Dutch newspapers started hiring Dutch artists to create comic strips of their own. Among the most notable were Yoebje en Achmed ("Yoebje and Achmed") (1919) and Tripje en Liezebertha (1923) by Henk Backer, Bulletje en Boonestaak ("Bulletje and Boonestaak", 1922-1937) by Dutch writer A. M. de Jong and artist George van Raemdonck – actually of Flemish descent and an ex-pat refugee from war-torn Belgium, considered to be the first Flemish comic artist though he created his comic in the Netherlands – and Snuffelgraag en Knagelijntje by Gerrit Th. Rotman and Arie Pleysier. Of all these comics Bulletje en Boonestaak had the most success in translations, becoming the first Dutch comic to see translations into German (1924) and French (1926). At the same time it also caused outrage among moral guardians because of anti-authoritarian behaviour, frequent nudity, violence and gross-out humor, such as vomiting. Backer's Tripje and Liezebertha was popular enough to inspire a lot of merchandising.

The early example of a Dutch comics magazine was Kleuterblaadje (Toddler Magazine) published in 1915 and had a weekly comic strip, often translations and even plagiarism from foreign language magazines. Many children's magazines began to devote one or more of their page to comics, but the first actual full-fledged Dutch comics magazine was published in 1922: Het Dubbeltje. It only lasted two-and-a-half years, but other more successful ones followed in its wake, such as Doe Mee (1936-1942) (1946-1949), Olijk en Vrolijk (1937-1941)

The 1930s saw P. Koenen's "De Lotgevallen van Pijpje Drop" ("The Adventures of Pijpje Drop" (1930), "Flipje" (1935) by Harmsen van der Beek and Gijsje Goochem by Jac Grosman. In 1932 Frans Piët also created a newspaper comic strip called Wo-Wang en Simmy, which was a predecessor to his more successful series Sjors en Sjimmie (1938). Piët based his character Sjors directly on Perry from Martin Branner's Perry and the Rinkydinks. Sjors also inspired a comics magazine of his own in 1936. Another influential Dutch comics artist who made his debut in 1934 was Marten Toonder. He created a comic strip called "Thijs IJs", which was a substitute for Rupert Bear after the newspaper lost the publication rights. By far the most popular Dutch comic strip of this era was Flippie Flink (1933) by Louis Raemaekers and Clinge Doorenbos. A stage adaptation was produced, with the actor playing the part of Flippie greeting hundreds of children in the streets.

=== World War II ===
The German occupation in 1940 prevented further Anglo-American imports and led initially to a greater production of native material. Nazi censorship and paper shortage worked to the detriment of the comics field. At the same time the embargo against American and British comic strips also meant that Dutch comics artists received more chances to publish their own material, even if it meant becoming a member of the Kulturkammer, the Nazi cultural watchdog. The most notable Dutch comic strips to debut during the Nazi occupation were Alfred Mazure's Dick Bos (1942) and Marten Toonder's influential Tom Poes (Tom Puss) (1941-1986 as newspaper comic). Willy Smit and Herman Looman's Tijs Wijs de Torenwachter (1940-1942) and Wim Meuldijk's Sneeuwvlok de Eskimo (1942-1944) were popular enough at the time to be adapted into stage plays, but are completely forgotten today.

=== After 1945: The two great Dutch comic classics come into being ===
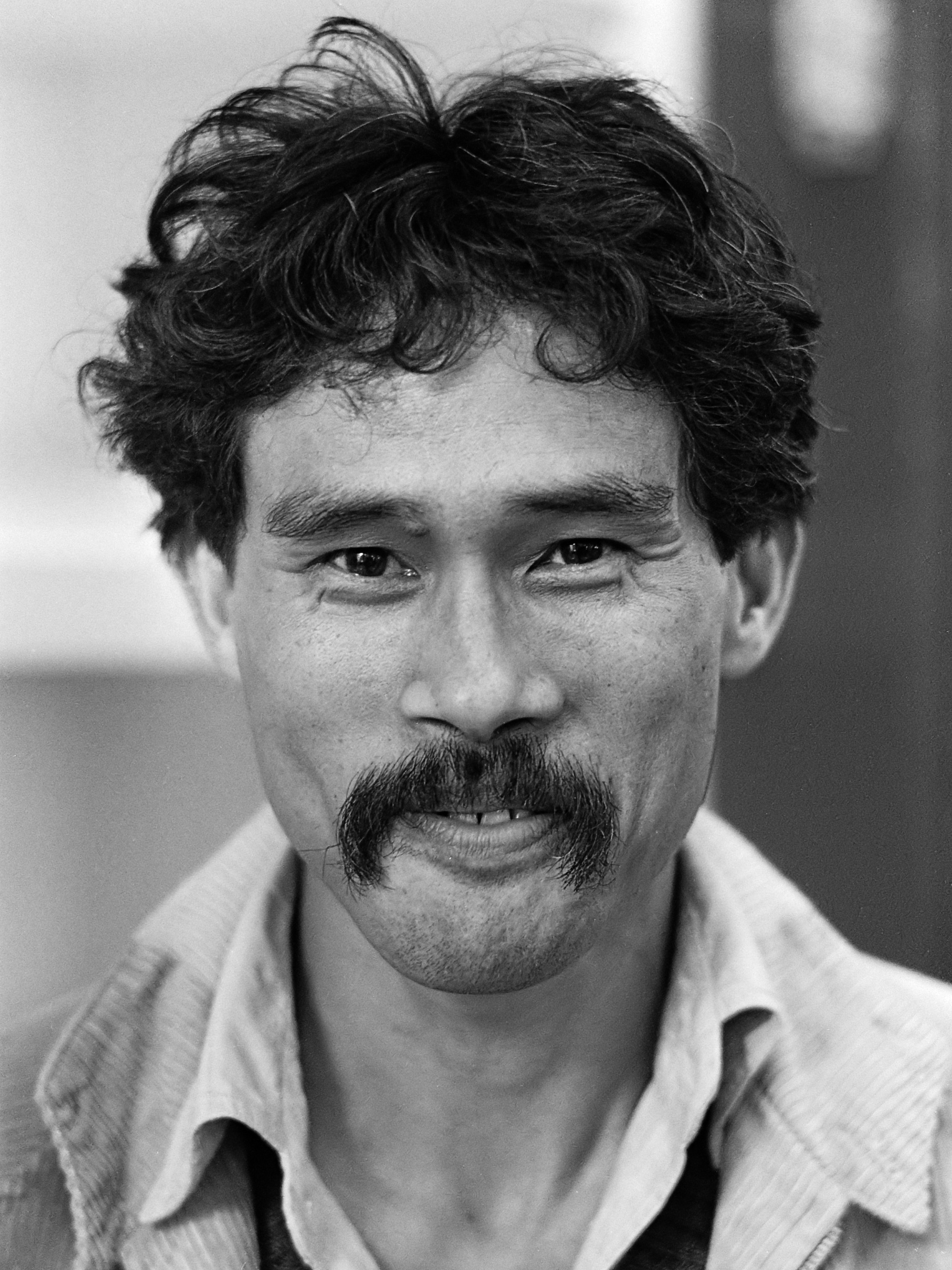
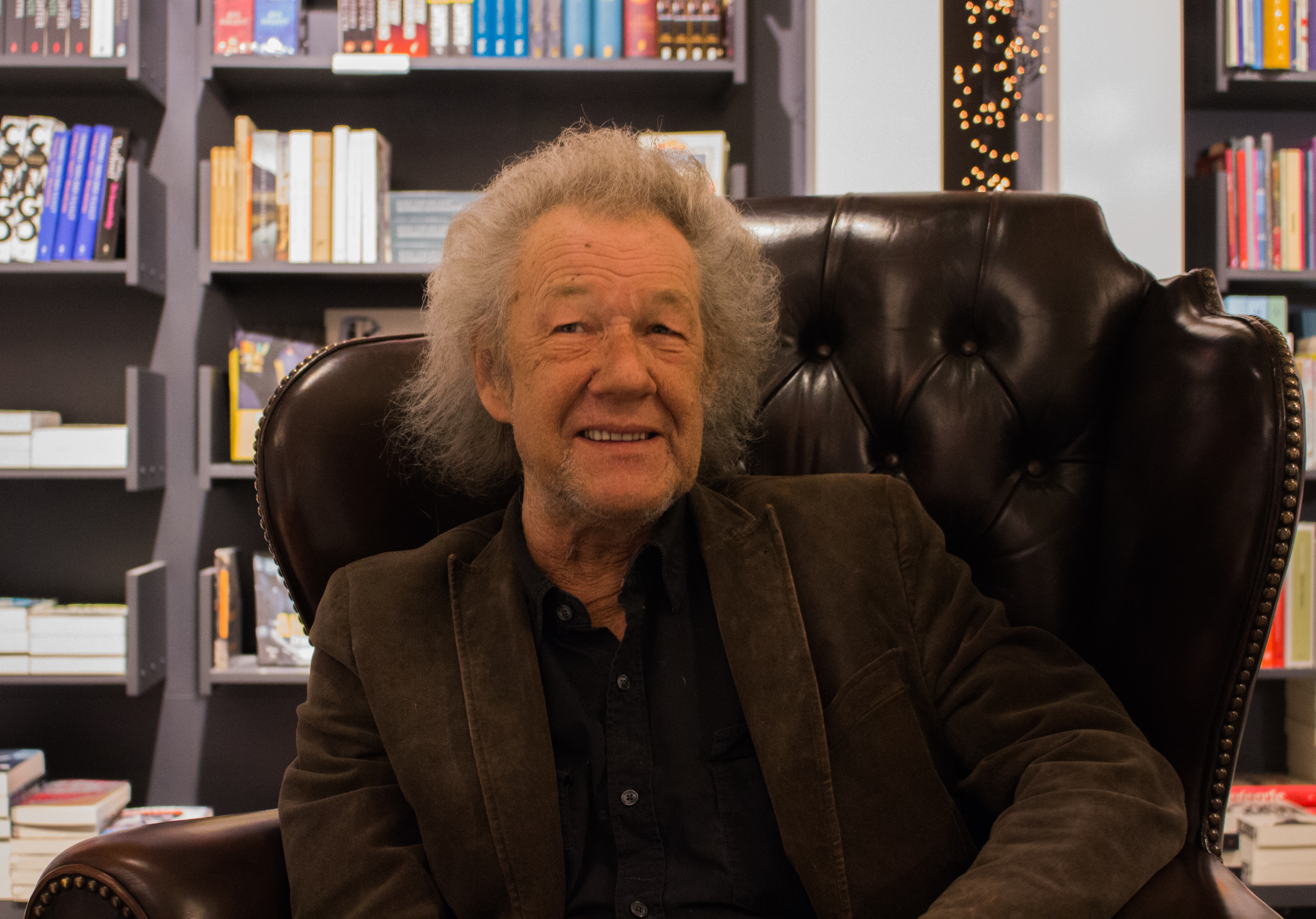
Bomans' and Voges' Pa Pinkelman as second to the right among the main protagonists of the comic, with future Dutch comic names of note Thé Tjong-Khing (1978) and Dick Matena (2014), who started out their careers at the Toonder Studio's.

After the liberation the publication of comics boomed, with many successful series being published in newspapers, such as Pieter Kuhn's Kapitein Rob (1946-1966), Hans G. Kresse's Eric de Noorman (1946-1964), Phiny Dick's Olle Kapoen (1946-1954, Dick was Toonder's spouse), Marten Toonder's Kappie (1945-1972), Panda (1946-1991) and Koning Hollewijn (1954-1971), Godfried Bomans and Carol Voges's De Avonturen van Pa Pinkelman (1946-1952), Jean Dulieu's Paulus de Boskabouter (Paulus the woodgnome, which spawned a long-running 1955-64 radio show as well as two popular 1968-69 and 1974-75 puppetshows made for television), Henk Sprenger's Kick Wilstra (1949- ... ), Bob van den Born's Professor Pi (1955-1965), Willy Lohmann's Kraaienhove (1962-1972), Peter van Straaten's Vader & Zoon (1968-1987). The most successful and productive Dutch comics studio were the Toonder Studio's, renamed as such by Marten Toonder in 1945, who both made comics as well as animated cartoons, already during the war years. They also launched the short-lived comics magazine Tom Poes Weekblad (Tom Puss Weekly, 1947-1951).

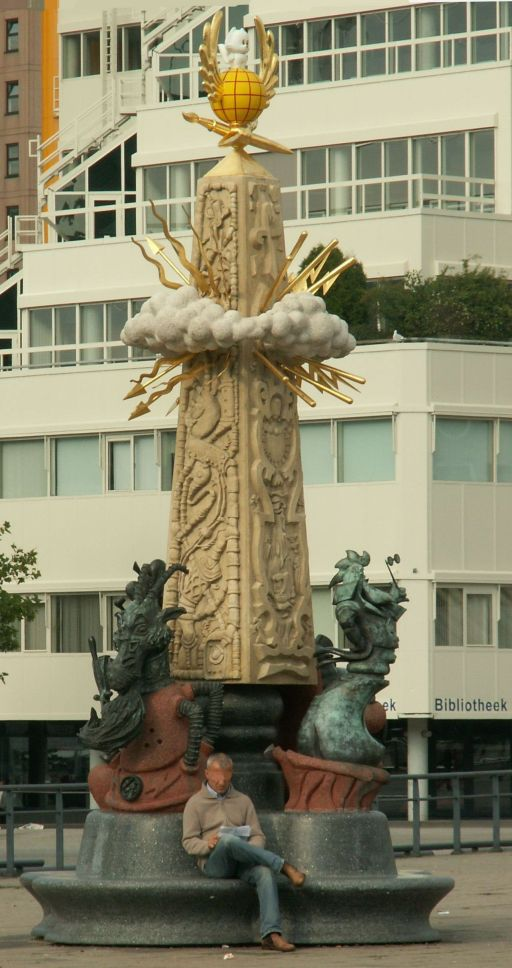
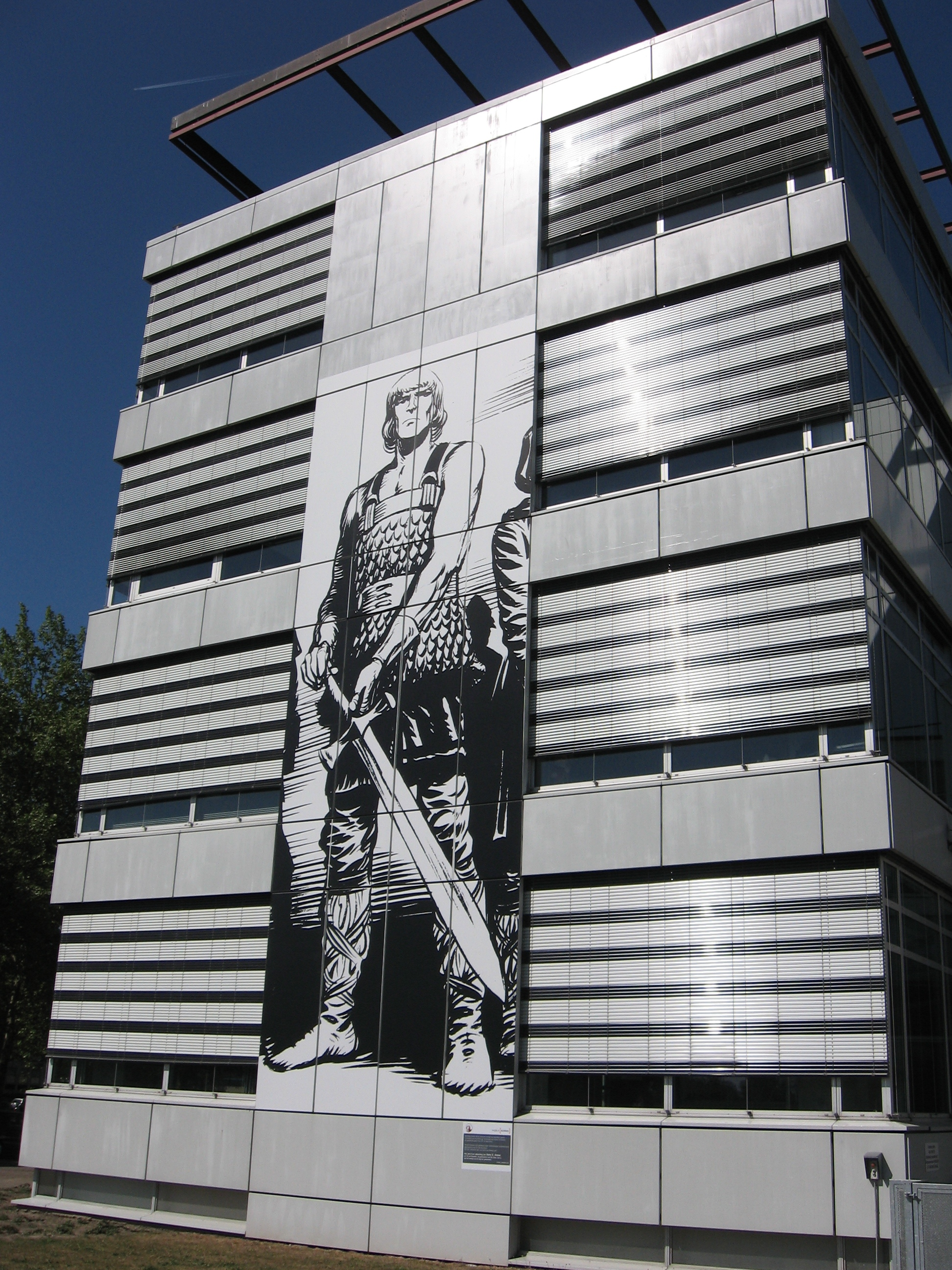
The permanent Toonder Monument (2002) in front of the main public library of the artist's native city Rotterdam, and Eric de Noorman on a mural in the Dutch city of Arnhem (r) on the occasion of the 60th anniversary of Kresse's creation (2007), and both expressive of the status both men still hold in the Netherlands.

The Toonder Studio's was not created by its namesake, but actually had its origins in the Diana Edition agency, established by the Jewish-Austrian refugee Fritz Gottesmann in the 1930s and where Toonder started to work in 1939. Gottesmann had to go into hiding during the war and left the company into the care of his by then partner Toonder from 1941 onward, but was later captured and died in the Mauthausen-Gusen concentration camp, de facto bequeathing the company to Toonder, who successfully made the company into what it became, starting in the war years and in the process renaming the company after himself. The Toonder Studio's turned out to be a fruitful breeding ground for post-war Dutch comic talents, born before or during the war, as the majority of them started out their careers at the company in one way or another, which included such names as Fred Julsing, Lo Hartog van Banda, Thé Tjong-Khing, Dick Matena and Piet Wijn. Even Dutch great Hans. G. Kresse, while not formally working for the Studio's, started out his career during the war in close cooperation with the company.

Throughout the 1940s and 1950s educators in a conservative society the Netherlands still was at the time, highly discouraged young people reading comics, because they felt it was a bad influence on them. Many magazines and newspapers went across their censorship and moral objections by publishing their series in a text comics format. This allowed children to at least read some sentences and could guide them to "real literature". Yet, it was partly for these reasons that the Dutch text comic enjoyed its golden age in the era 1945–1960, with Tom Poes, Eric de Noorman and Kapitein Rob as its standard bearers.

Of these latter three, it were Tom Poes, Eric de Noorman and their two creators in particular who went on to conquer a special place in Dutch popular awareness, in the process becoming the two personifications of the classic Dutch comics, eclipsing all the others, which are increasingly becoming dim memories only. Though obviously fondly remembered by the older Dutch generations, their renown have become such that even the younger native generations, even though the vast majority of them has never read a single title of these two creations, still recognize the names Tom Poes en Oliver B. Bommel and Eric de Noorman. The memory and cultural heritage of its two creators, Toonder and Kresse respectively, is actively kept alive by its two respective private foundations "Toonder Compagnie BV" (actually started in 2000 as the "Stichting Het Toonder Auteursrecht" by Toonder himself, as he was keenly aware of the impact his creations had made in Dutch cultural awareness), and the "Stichting Hans G. Kresse", until 2009 the only such organizations specifically dedicated to the work of individual Dutch comic artists, after which they were joined by "Stichting Jan Kruis Museum". Predominately run by (family) heirs and sympathetic professionals, the two foundations in their goal of maintaining the cultural legacy of both artists – aside from safeguarding and maintaining their original art collections – organize exhibitions on a regular basis at the various cultural institutions, publish bibliographical book publications of for example biographies and rare, unknown and previously unpublished works, as well as providing information and illustrations to media interested in reporting on the two comic artists and their work. The Kresse foundation though, appears to have dialed down its activities around 2018 when its official "Eric de Noorman" website went dark. Exemplary of the continued presence in Dutch popular awareness of Tom Poes en Oliver B. Bommel was Dutch collector Pim Oosterheert, who possesses one of the largest private collections of Toonder materials. Oosterheert decided to turn his home in Zoeterwoude into a bonafide museum, Museum de Bommelzolder, whose opening in 1998 was presided over by Toonder's son in the presence of Dutch comic scene alumni and local dignitaries, and enjoys the full backing of the Toonder Compagnie. A well visited museum, enlarged and as of 2017 still in existence, Oosterheert expanded his activities with the publication of a semi-regular newsletter and reference books, as well as traveling lectures. For the main bodies of work of both artists, their two respective foundations closely cooperate with Hans Matla, a figure of note in the Dutch comic scene from the mid-1970s onward, whose publishing house Uitgeverij Panda (named after one of Toonder's creations, even though the company logo features the eponymous animal) releases bibliographical/bibliophilic limited "integrale" editions of these works, helping to keep the memory alive.

Pieter Kuhn's Kapitein Rob was published alongside the work of Toonder and Kresse, but did not achieve the same lasting recognition. In 2021, comics publisher Uitgeverij Personalia began reprinting the complete Kapitein Rob series.

==== 1946: Advent of the Franco-Belgian comic ====
Tom Poes Weekblad, featuring the for the Netherlands traditional text comics, had to compete right from the start with Belgian weekly competitors Kuifje and Robbedoes (Dutch magazine) from publishers Le Lombard and Dupuis respectively, which became available in the country around the turn of 1946/1947. The magazines, unaltered Dutch-language versions of their French counterparts Tintin (1946-1993, applying for both language editions) and Spirou (1938-, the Dutch version folded in 2005) respectively, acquainted Dutch readership with the phenomenon, not much later known as the Franco-Belgian bande dessinée, in the process (re-)introducing them to the speech balloon comic. As a format, these comics gradually, but steadily, gained increasing popularity, especially under readers born around, and after the war, becoming an influence of note on a new generation of Dutch comic creators, from the 1960s onward. Both Robbedoes and Kuifje far outlived all their other native contemporaries introduced in the 1945-1950 era, including Tom Poes Weekblad, all of which nowadays only known unto comic historians. It were not only the new generations who were influenced by the Franco-Belgian comic, even a veteran mainstay like Hans G. Kresse, who had achieved fame in the text comic format, created his latter-day comics series in the Franco-Belgian format, and which included Vidocq (1965-1970; 1986-1988), Erwin, de zoon van Eric de Noorman (1969-1973) and most notably his acclaimed Indianenreeks (Indian Books, 1972–2001, the last volume published posthumously), which, contrary to most of his other work, has seen multiple – as in more than one or two – translations in other languages, including English as British publisher Methuen Publishing has published the first two volumes in 1975 for the UK market. Another example was Piet Wijn who started out his career in 1947 creating text comics for the Toonder Studios – among others the aforementioned Koning Hollewijn comic – , but who achieved international renown for his Douwe Dabbert (1971-2001), created in the Franco-Belgian tradition for the Dutch Disney Studios.

It was through Kuifje, where the series ran from 1948 to 1959, that Dutch readership was introduced to Suske en Wiske and where the series started its journey to become one of Holland's most all-time popular comic series.

==== 1948: Crisis ====
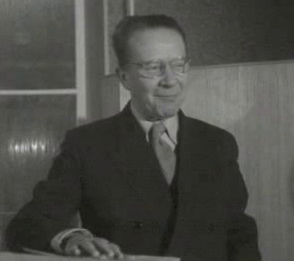
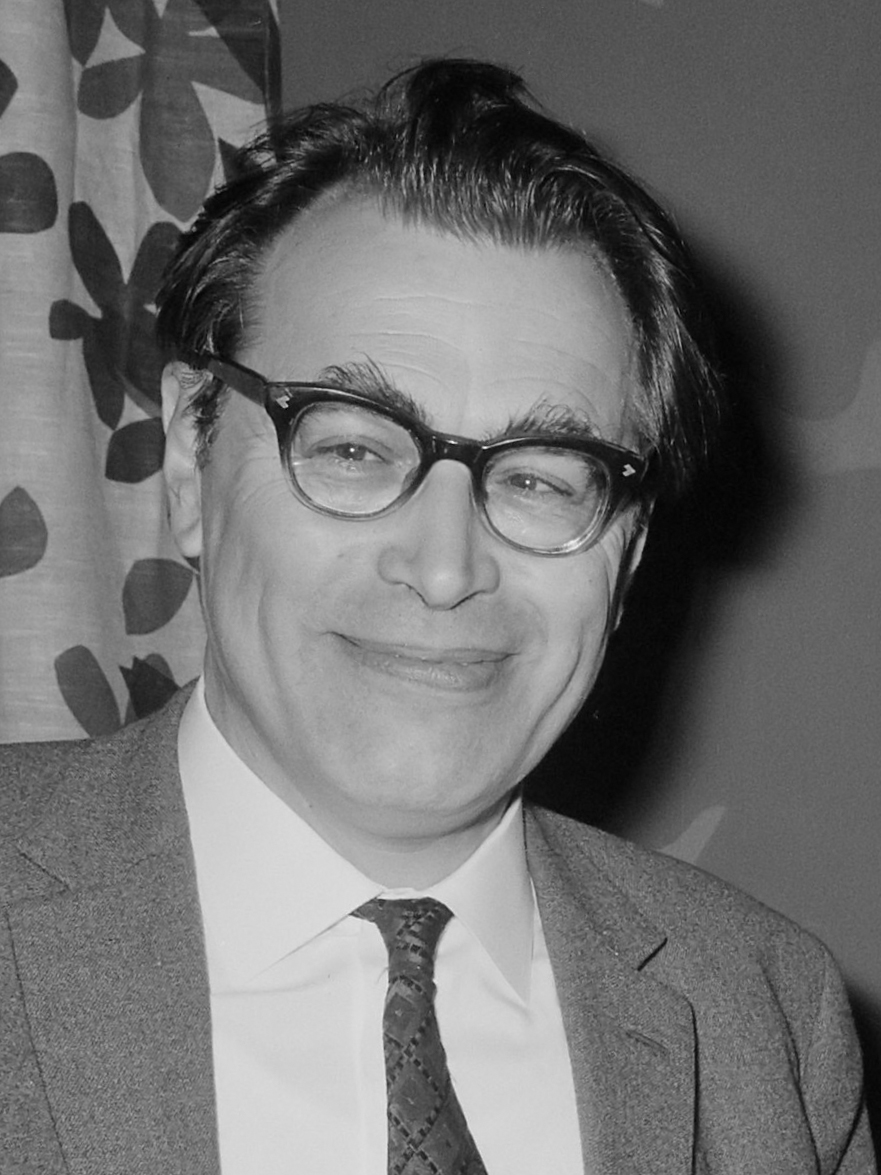
Education Minister Theo Rutten (1952), author of the 1948 letter, that has proven to be fateful for Dutch comics, with Godfried Bomans (1965) on the right, author of De Avonturen van Pa Pinkelman and one of the few public figures at the time who took an open stand in his other writings against the upheaval Rutten's letter has caused.

Late 1948 turned out to be a seminal moment in time for the Dutch comic world when Dutch Minister of Education Theo Rutten had his official letter, dated 19 October 1948, published in the October 25, 1948 issue of the newspaper Het Parool, directly addressing educational institutions and local government bodies, advocating the prohibition of comics, or rather the below mentioned "beeldromans". He stated, "These booklets, which contain a series of illustrations with accompanying text, are generally sensational in character, without any other value. It is not possible to proceed in a legal manner against printers, publishers or distributors of these novels, nor can anything be achieved by not making paper available to them, since this for those publications necessary paper, is available on the free market," further implying that it became the civil duty of parents, teachers and civil servants, including policemen, to confiscate and destroy comic books wherever they found them, or as he had put it, "If you would like to point out, unnecessarily perhaps, to your school personnel that it is desirable to ensure that the students do not bring the graphic novels into school or distribute them to their comrades.(...) Where the circumstances make this desirable, the students are to be pointed out the very superficial nature of this literature, and the numerous books that are more worthy of their attention." Less than a month later, a 16-year-old girl was murdered in a bizarre manner on November 19 in the small town of Enkhuizen by her 15-year old boyfriend, who had tied her down to railroad tracks where she was killed by a passing train. An initially mystified police subsequently uncovered that both had been ravenous readers of comic books of the kind that were in concordance with Rutten's definition in his letter. Taken as validation, a moral outcry ensued, causing not only "beeldromans", but all comic books being en masse confiscated and destroyed around the country by parents and educators, with all comic publications being suspended and public libraries removing and destroying any comic books they might have had in their collections. On the occasion, and in an effort to outdo other contemporary media statements of indignation, libraries went even as far as coining comic books in a public statement, "an atrocious sickness of the times, ready for suicide of the soul in its despondency". It nearly destroyed the comic phenomenon in the Netherlands, which had only just begun recovering from the war years. The only exceptions were made for a small number of "healthy" comic productions from the Toonder Studio's, which included the by then considered literary comic strip Tom Poes. Reactions to the incident were not state-sanctioned initiatives, but rather spontaneous, popular responses.

Despite the upheaval the incident has caused in the Netherlands, Dutch authorities have refrained from ever passing laws or instituting agencies of the restrictive kind France, Germany and Canada – which had purely by chance experienced a near-similar comics related incident at almost the exact same time with a likewise lethal outcome – established, even though the former two countries had not experienced comic related incidents of the magnitude the Netherlands and Canada had. This was partly due to the fact that the moral panic surrounding the incident subsided rather quickly, as evidenced by the fact that the newspaper De Telegraaf resumed comic publication only weeks after the incident – even though that newspaper had had a leading hand in the uprising against the medium at the time – , and partly due to the fact, as Rutten himself had already implied, that the Dutch constitution simply did not allow for them, contrary to the ones of France and Germany which had allowances embedded for youth publications (see: Seduction of the Innocent), whereas Canada simply amended its Criminal Code, something Dutch authorities did not even consider. Not only that, but the phenomenon was not entirely without its own supporters, albeit from a freedom of expression point of view, as Dutch literary giant Godfried Bomans had worded at the time in his column of Elsevier, "The reading is healthy. The format in which she has been subordinated is merely flawed. This is an aesthetic flaw, not a moral one. By confusing these, we ignore the essence of the art of the novel." Still, while the Dutch comic world never went as far as their US and German counterparts did, i.e. establishing self-censuring institutions, they henceforth chose to err on the side of caution for the time being, until the advent of the comics magazine Pep in the 1960s.

==== 1954: Tom Poes becomes Dutch literature ====
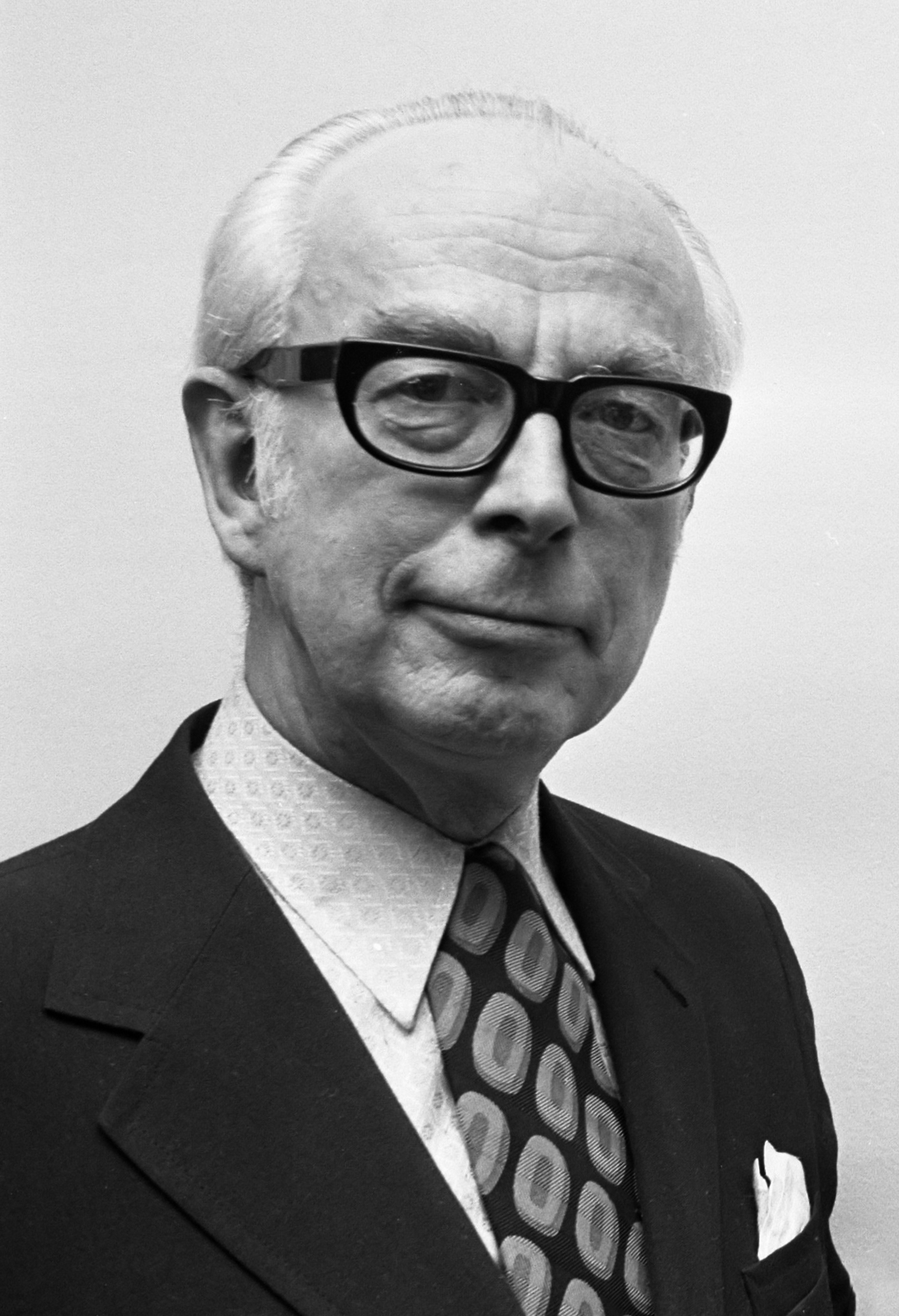
Marten Toonder (1970) and his most famous creations Tom Poes en Olivier B. Bommel

While being considered "healthy" and thus exempted from the purge resulting from the 1948 incident, Marten Toonder was not that confident that his Tom Poes (or any other from his studios for that matter) was out of the woods yet, and as a result he too, like Bomans, took a stand against the hysteria engulfing the country at the time, expressing his concerns in the 1949 Tom Poes story "Horror, de ademloze" through the words of Tom Poes' faithful friend, sidekick, companion, and all around gentleman Oliver B. Bommel (Oliver B. Bumble). In hindsight however, Toonder needed not to have worried personally. Tom Poes actually started out as a children's comic with the first six stories being written by Toonder's wife Phiny Dick; and indeed Toonder based his characters Tom Poes en Oliver B. Bommel – who made his first appearance in the third story – on the characters his wife had created for a children's book trilogy she had written and illustrated in the period 1939-1941: the (female) kitten "Miezelijntje", she herself considered the younger sister of Tom Poes, and the boy bear "Wol de Beer". Yet, from the moment Toonder made Tom Poes truly his own, his eloquent mastery of the Dutch language was quite early on recognized by critics as bonafide Dutch literature, only emphasized by the fact that several recurrent utterances by Oliver Bommel (who was such a popular figure, that he actually took over the series, retitled "Heer Bommel" – "Gentleman Bommel" – as the main protagonist in the later speech balloon versions) have percolated over the years into colloquial Dutch, such as "Als U begrijpt wat ik bedoel" ("If you know what I mean") and "Als U mij wilt verschonen" ("If you will excuse me"), and which was very much met with the approval of the conservative educators mentioned above, and the primary reason why his studio productions became exempt from the 1948/49 purge.

Toonder's growing renown as a literary author was formalized when he was invited to become a fellow of the prestigious "Maatschappij der Nederlandse Letterkunde" literary society in 1954, ironically the same year Fredric Wertham published his comic condemning Seduction of the Innocent treatise in the United States. As of 2020, the Toonder creations are the only Dutch comic creations formally recognized as Dutch cultural heritage albeit, and this can not be stressed enough, for its texts only, and not its art. Exemplary of this, is that Toonder's current literary publisher De Bezige Bij, Holland's most important purely literary publisher and for decades now Toonder's literary publisher, exclusively reprints Toonder's text comics only, dismissing all his latter-day balloon comics for (non-comic) Revue and Donald Duck magazines, including Tom Poes, as being outside, what they consider, Toonder canon. This stance is mirrored, and thus formalized, on the official website of the Literatuurmuseum (Holland's official, state-owned literature museum, located in The Hague), where only his text comics are given attention. Conceived as replacement for the by the Germans prohibited Micky Mouse Disney comic, its "quasi-protected" literature status has been an important contributing factor for Tom Poes en Oliver B. Bommel to become the longest running news paper text comic in Dutch comic history, well until after the text comic format had gone out of favor by the mid to late-1960s (when different Heer Bommel text balloon stories started to run concurrently in magazines). Published exclusively in the newspaper De Telegraaf, it ran almost uninterrupted – save for two short suspensions in the final six months of the war due to increased Nazi meddling with the newspaper, and a second, far shorter one in 1948 as explained above – from March 1941 until 1986. Remarkably, considering the fact that Godfried Bomans was already established as a figure of note in Dutch literature, his De Avonturen van Pa Pinkelman (all but forgotten nowadays) has not been accorded the same status.

The elevation of Tom Poes into "official" literature has also sparked a decades long tug-of-war between the Dutch literary world and the Dutch comics world over "spiritual ownership" of Toonder's creations, which only seemed to have died down after the adoption of the English expression "graphic novel" in the Netherlands in the late-1980s as well, being deemed acceptable to both sides of the discourse. Graphic novel translates into Dutch as "Beeldroman", and the Dutch expression was originally in use during the 1940s for a typical Dutch comic format, which was precisely the format targeted by, and not surviving, the purge of 1948 (see below), though the Dutch expression itself was resurrected as translation for graphic novel by the literary world, whereas the Dutch comics world prefers the use of the English expression. Exemplary of the tug-of-war between the two worlds as far as the Toonder comics were concerned, is, while De Bezige Bij only publishes his work according to their definition of Toonder canon, that Hans Matla's publishing house Panda Uitgeverij has proceeded with several bibliographical/bibliophilic "integrale" publications of the entirety of Toonder's main body of work, including his latter-day speech balloon creations, and thus approaching the subject matter from a comics art point of view.

Yet, the literary status of Tom Poes also came at a cost; Toonder making the fullest use of the intricacies of the Dutch language – in the process actually inventing some new Dutch language – also meant that the appeal of his creations remained mostly limited to Dutch-Europe, as translation in foreign languages was bedevilishly difficult to achieve without having much of its nuances and subtleties, having become the corner stones for Tom Poes in the first place, being lost in translation. This was especially pertinent for the Romance languages, including French, where very few Toonder creations are known to exist in translation, contrary to the Germanic languages – including English as Toonder, having acquired the language skills during his world travels before the war, had actually created some original Tom Puss stories in English for the British market – , particularly the Scandinavian ones due to their grammatical similarities. Of the two Dutch greats, Hans G. Kresse therefore became the more translated one, but who is otherwise shunned by the Dutch cultural authorities.

=== The 1950s and 1960s: Recovery ===
Douwe Dabbert, the successful comic that started its run in Donald Duck

In the wake of the 1948 upheaval, the Dutch comic world initially relied predominantly on "healthy" imports, apart from their own Toonder Studios productions and the already established Robbedoes and Kuifje magazines which resumed distribution after the short-lived suspension, with 1952 marking the introduction of the most popular Dutch comics magazine, when Donald Duck published its first Dutch-language issue. It, in initial conjunction with the Toonder Studio's, quickly became a national institution and published, apart from Disney comics, also comic series from former Toonder Studio's artists like Thom Roep and Piet Wijn's earlier mentioned Douwe Dabbert (1971-2001) and Van Nul tot Nu (1982) by Thom Roep and Co Loerakker. Douwe Dabbert went on to become one of the great success stories of Dutch comics.

In the wake of Donald Duck, other comics from American origin, which were immensely popular in the country in the interbellum era (as indeed they were in the rest of Europe) made their reappearance in the country as well, when National Periodical Publications (the later DC Comics) opened a local branch in 1956 in the town of Huizen, Classics Lektuur, made responsible for the Dutch translations and distribution of their comic productions. With what was originally named Classics Nederland (later rechristened Williams Nederland before its final name), the Netherlands had actually received its first specialized comic book publisher, though care was taken with the sensibilities still present in the country as the company initially started out with the publication of predominantly "safe" series, the most conspicuous one having been the translated version of Classics Illustrated, and after which the Dutch subsidiary was named to begin with. Regaining the popularity they had before the war (contrary to France and Belgium, where American comics failed to make a comeback, the Disney productions excepted), particularly in mid-1960s to early 1970s era after attitudes towards the medium had relaxed when comic series of a less edifying nature were added to the array, American style comics went out of vogue in translation by the end of the 1970s, being increasingly supplanted in popularity by the Franco-Belgian style comics, both native and in translation from their originating countries, which also resulted in the demise of the company itself.

Still, exemplary of the cautious course the Dutch comic scene embarked upon after the 1948 incident was the advent of the magazines Taptoe (1953-2016) and Okki (1953-) in the early 1950s – both reinventions of older, pre-war Catholic school magazines and later followed by Jippo (1974-1984) – , all of them of an educational nature and grounded in the Catholic faith, aimed at the pre-adolescent primary school youth, and widely disseminated in schools around the nation in the era, especially the Catholic south of the country. Like their French counterparts of the era, the Fleurus presse publications such as Cœurs Vaillants and the like, the magazines featured plenty of comics, albeit of an edifying nature in the text comics format initially, but unlike the Fleurus publications, they did provide a stepping stone for native comic talents to start out their respective careers in the speech balloon format like Willy Lohmann, Piet Wijn, Jan Steeman, Jan Kruis, Fred Julsing, Gerrit de Jager, Joost Swarte and Patty Klein (one of the very few female comic artists who started out in the era as such after her apprenticeship at the Toonder Studio's), eventually supplanting the increasingly obsolete text format comics created by artists now forgotten. All these artist had to start out in such publications as the only original Dutch-language comic magazine publications either went out of business very quickly, as was the case with the native magazines, or were not willing to provide any space for these budding Dutch talents at the time, as was the case with the two Flemish magazines, who were very protective of their own native Belgian artists, then and later on. Dick Matena, Paul Teng and Peter de Smet are the only Dutch comic artists known to have been directly contracted by Kuifje publisher Le Lombard for direct album publications without prior magazine publication (excepting some of De Smet's Viva Zapapa short gags, which were pre-published in the magazine), whereas Gerrit Stapel, Toon van Driel, Gerrit de Jager, Geerard Lever, Henk Kuijpers and, again, Peter de Smet are the only Dutch comic artists known to have been contracted by Dupuis to contribute to their Robbedoes magazine for a short period of time in the 1980s only, most of whom not seeing their creations issued as albums by the publisher afterwards. As of 2017, Okki is still in existence, contrary to most of their successors who followed suit in their wake, but its role in the Dutch comic scene has been all but played out.

Yet, hard on the heels of these edifying publications, came the first purely Dutch initiated comic magazines aimed at an adolescent readership without the edifying nature of the Catholic magazines, which included Sjors van de Rebellenclub (1950-1976, featuring predominantly comics from British origin initially, though from the start Dutch creations were included such as those from Bert Bus and in particular those of the titular hero by Frans Piët after whom the magazine was named, at a later point in time added upon with creations by artists who had started out for the Catholic magazines, Jan Steenman, Jan Kruis and Patty Klein in particular), Fix & Foxi (1959-1966; while largely a translated variant of the German source publication – itself the German answer to Donald Duck – it afforded Dutch readers one of the first opportunities to become acquainted with post-war comics of predominantly French origins as the magazine already contained comics from early volumes of French Pilote magazine) and Pep (1962-1975, cooperating in the early years with Disney, Toonder Studios, and Le Lombard – the parent publisher of Kuifje magazine – , especially featuring creations from Hans G. Kresse who had worked for both the former two). One of the most popular series that became published in Sjors was the British comic series The Trigan Empire, whose artist, Don Lawrence (creating his series directly in colors in the Frank Hampson tradition, something hitherto not seen before in the Dutch comic world), was yet to play a role of note in the Dutch comic world. Also mentionable was Arend weekly magazine (1955-1956, where Hampson's Dan Dare creation had seen partial publication as Daan Durf), a translated variant of the contemporary British comic magazine Eagle. But it was Tina magazine (1967-), likewise initially a translated version of British magazine Princess Tina, but unlike the source publication, from the start executed in color, that has become the most notable one of the British inspired magazines as a girls' magazine which published a lot of comics, predominantly from British origin (albeit it mostly drawn by anonymous Spanish Fleetway studios artists), just like Sjors magazine had at first. And like Sjors, Tina would provide a platform for Dutch talents like Kruis, Steeman and Klein to flourish, unsurprisingly perhaps as both magazines were at the time published by Dutch publishing house Uitgeverij en Drukkerij De Spaarnestad, contrary to Pep magazine which was published by its big competitor of the time, De Geïllustreerde Pers.

==== Pep magazine ====
Agent 327 holding a fake gun and an album cover of Franka (Vol. 3, 1978), two other successes of the Dutch comic world, but which started out in Pep magazine.

However, it was Pep in particular that turned out to be an emancipating force for the Dutch comic world, freeing it from the shackles of 1948 while coaching on the winds of the social and cultural changes that not only swept the Netherlands, but the entire western world in the 1960s. From the mid-1960s onward the magazine reinvented itself when it quite radically distanced itself from its Disney and Le Lombard roots, as comics from these publishing houses already appeared in the competing Donald Duck and Kuifje, whereas the comics from the French magazine Pilote (est. 1959, and itself susceptible to the cultural changes taking place, especially from the May 1968 events in France onwards), with which Pep now aligned itself with and henceforth increasingly featuring productions from that magazine, had not yet seen a wide dissemination in the Netherlands – and Flanders for that matter. It was Pep which introduced Dutch readership to great Franco-Belgian comic classics from the Dargaud stable like Roodbaard (Charlier and Hubinon), Blueberry (Charlier en Giraud; The previous introduction in 1965 of these two having failed in Fix & Foxi, as that magazine targeted an entirely different age readership, thus remaining unnoticed), and most conspicuously Asterix (Goscinny and Uderzo), which ran in the magazine from its very inception to become one of the all-time most popular comic series in the Netherlands, as indeed it became in the rest of Europe. Other Pilote comics introduced to Dutch readership concerned Olivier Blunder (Greg) en Ravian (Christin en Mézières), as well as the poetic comic Philémon from Fred and the satirical comics from Marcel Gotlib at a later point in time. It was through Pep, together with its Kuifje and Robbedoes contemporaries, that Franco-Belgian comics and their native derivatives started to occupy their preeminent place in the Dutch comic scene in earnest.

It was Pep magazine (and its successor Eppo) that saw such first-time original publications of Dutch comic world mainstays, like Martin Lodewijk's Agent 327 (1967-1985; 2000- ... ), Dick Matena and Lo Hartog van Banda's De Argonautjes (1970-1980), Gideon Brugman's Ambrosius (1970-1974), Fred Julsink's Wellington Wish (1971-1973), Peter de Smet's De Generaal (1971-2003), Jan Steeman and Andries Brandt's Roel Dijkstra (1977-1995), Henk Kuijpers's Franka (1974-...), originally as Het Misdaadmuseum) and Hanco Kolk and Peter de Wit's Gilles de Geus (1985-2003).

It was not only the young generation of Dutch comic artists who found a fruitful platform for their creations in the magazine, Pep also provided the veteran Hans G. Kresse with a venue for what can be considered his second comics career. Attached to the magazine from the very start, Kresse not only provided illustrations for the magazine's editorials and short prose stories as well as magazine covers on behalf of the other magazine artists in the early years, but also started to create his early magazine comic series in the increasingly popular speech balloon format (thereby abandoning the text comic format in which he had achieved fame) of which Zorro (1964-1967) was the best known at that time. Together with the Asterix artists, Kresse was one of the very few magazine artists who survived the radical formula change Pep implemented a few years into its existence, and major series he created for the magazine afterwards were the aforementioned Vidocq and Erwin, de zoon van Eric de Noorman (spinoff series of Eric de Noorman, centered around his son Erwin). During his tenure at the magazine, Kresse started to take a keen interest in the plight of the Native-Americans and started to express this in a series of one-shot comic stories, increasingly featuring his indignation over the historical treatment of Native-Americans by the Europeans, which included Matho Tonga, De wraak van Minimic (both 1970), Mangas Coloradas: Woestijn van wraak (1971–72) and Wetamo: De heks van Pocasset (1972–73). In the process, Kresse actually became one of the first comic artists anywhere who started to paint a more even-keeled, realistic and human picture of the Native-American, who was hitherto commonly depicted in comics as either an uncivilized bloodthirsty barbarian or as the equally unrealistic "noble savage". In this, Kresse became the forerunner of such artists as the Swiss Derib (Buddy Longway, Celui-qui-est-né-deux-fois), the Frenchmen Michel Blanc-Dumont and Laurence Harlé (Jonathan Cartland) and the Dutchman Paul Teng (Delgadito), who later on explored the social intricacies of the Native-American world in greater detail in their creations. The increasing, more adult social engagement Kresse exhibited in these works, was something new in Dutch youth comic magazines and were precursors to his acclaimed Indianen reeks, one of the first mainstream Dutch comic creations which (together with his last two one-shots, Wetamo in particular) were later recognized as early Dutch precursors of what was later coined "graphic novels", as in works featuring more mature and adult themes. Kresse remained attached to Pep and its successors for the remainder of his life, one of his last creations having been a new latter-day speech balloon format addition to his most famous series Eric de Noorman he had abandoned in 1964, De vrouw in het blauw (1985), which was followed by De geschiedenis van Bor Khan (1988–89) – actually a partially redrawn speech balloon adaption of the original version he had already created back in 1952/1953 in the text comic format, and which became the last recreation he completed before his death in 1992.

Despite its relatively short lifespan in comparison to its Flemish counterparts, but like its main inspiration Pilote has had on its, Pep magazine has left an indelible impression on an entire generation of young Dutch comic readers and future comic artists, but considerably less so on their Flemish contemporaries, they having traditionally been more oriented on their own Robbedoes and Kuifje magazines. A possible partial explanation of this is that several Dutch artists either worked in humorous and satirical references to Dutch current affairs in their creations (de Smet), had their creations take place in typical Dutch settings or circumstances (Kuijpers), or both (Lodewijk), which were lost on foreigners not familiar with these, therefore diminishing their appeal initially. Nonetheless, after the European Single Market came into being in 1993, the mobility of its citizens among the European Union member states has vastly increased, with the younger generations in particular becoming more intimately acquainted with local cultures, and which has played a part in the delayed introduction and acceptance of some of the typically Dutch comic creations in other language areas as well. This held especially true for Piet Wijn's Douwe Dabbert and Henk Kuijper's Franka – both of them far less beholden to Dutch current affairs than the others – , which have seen translations in more European languages afterwards.

Post-Pep-era comics artists, very popular in the Netherlands themselves, but who found the appeal of their bodies of work predominantly limited to the native market for the same reasons, included such artists as Gerrit de Jager (De familie Doorzon), Theo van den Boogaard (Sjef van Oekel), Eric Schreurs (Joop Klepzeiker), and Marnix Rueb (Haagse Harry), as remains the case with Martin Lodewijk (even though German translations of his Agent 327 have been attempted) and Peter de Smet. Incidentally and concurrently, the same holds conversely true for Dutch-Belgium, whose comic artists, like Marc Sleen or Jef Nys for example, find the appeal of their work mostly limited to native Flanders.

=== The 1970s and 1980s: Heyday ===
In the field of adult comics magazines Tante Leny presenteert! (1970-1978), Modern Papier (1971-1972) and De Vrije Balloen (1975-1983) were the most notable. From the 1960s on more American comics were imported, with the Dutch edition of the American Mad Magazine also had a lot of success and ran from 1964 until 1996, with a brief resurrection in 2011–2012. Sjors and Pep themselves later merged into Eppo (1975-1985), subsequently renamed as Eppo Wordt Vervolgd (1985-1988), Sjors en Sjimmie Maandblad (1988-1994), SjoSjii (1994-1998), Striparazzi (1998-1999) and again as Eppo in 2009. In the early 1980s the punk comic Red Rat was launched which soon became a cult classic of the Dutch squatters movement.

It's notable that the Netherlands were one of the few European countries to still publish text comics well into the 1960s, when the attitude towards comics began to change. In 1967 a center for comics fans, Het Stripschap, was founded, with their own specialized subject magazine Stripschrift. In 1968 the third-oldest comics store in the world, Lambiek was founded, with the country receiving its own comics museum in Groningen, "Het Nederlands Stripmuseum", in 2004.

== Formats ==
=== Text comics and oblongs ===
A format not unique to the Netherlands but once so common there that it got the designation Hollandse school. Text comics consist of a series of illustrations with a block of text underneath the images telling the story. Famous Dutch series in this format are: Bulletje en Boonestaak, Tom Puss, Oliver B. Bumble, Kapitein Rob, Eric de Noorman, Panda, De Avonturen van Pa Pinkelman and Paulus the woodgnome. These comics were prepublished in newspapers, after which they were collected and made available in small rectangular booklets, called "oblongs" for their shape, or on occasion referred to as "Italian Format" for its laying or landscape oriented paper format (meaning the booklet is larger in width than it is in height). Oblongs enjoyed their heyday in the Netherlands in the late 1940s-early 1960s, Tom Poes, Kapitein Rob and Erik de Noorman in particular. As Dutch newspapers are as of 2017 still publishing comic strips, albeit it currently in the speech balloon format only and in a far lower quantity than they used to, the oblong format is still being used as the designated book format (as is the case with the above-mentioned Toonder publications from De Bezige Bij), if it is decided to publish the comic as such after the fact, which is not always the case, though it has as a comic book format been completely eclipsed by the far more popular album format, mentioned below.

As a comic format, text comics rapidly became all but defunct by the mid-1960s, the format lingering on for a little while longer in newspapers (in which the format had blossomed), due to the increasing popularity of speech balloon comics introduced to Dutch readership through post-war Flemish, Franco-Belgian, American and British imports, published in translation in such magazines such as Donald Duck, Sjors, and Pep in particular. Even Dutch mainstays like Marten Toonder and Hans G. Kresse had by the early 1970s switched over to the speech balloon format themselves for their work, including their respective main creations Tom Poes and Eric de Noorman (retitled Erwin, the son of the titular hero, as later series outings increasingly concentrated on him), with which they had achieved fame in the text comic format.

=== Picture novels ("Beeldromans") ===
A format born out of paper scarcity in WW II. The booklets are small (about the size of a box of cigarettes) and have usually one picture on every page. The first, most famous, longest running and last series in this format is Dick Bos, which explains that "Dick Bos boekje (=booklet)" became a synonym for the format. Several of these stories were action-packed detective stories, full with people beating villains up. Actually, it was precisely this format Minister Theo Rutten targeted in his letter of 19 October 1948, and which inspired the media frenzy after the November 1948 incident in Enkhuizen, with people being outraged over the violent content, searching for, and finding a scapegoat in "violent" Dutch comics, in the process targeting almost the entire comic scene. Though the Dutch comic scene managed to recover from the incident eventually, the "beeldroman" did not survive the pursuant purge, which effectively meant the end of the genre. There was one exception though, as the publisher of the alternative namesake of the genre, Dick Bos managed to convince authorities to make an exception for Mazure's creation, using the argument that his hero used his martial art skills exclusively in service of the authorities, and was thus a "good guy". Being granted a stay of execution, Dick Bos managed therefore to hold on to live for quite some time, but did not make it into the 1970s eventually, thereby relegating the genre and format to history permanently. As a result, from the 1948/49 purge, few copies of series other than Dick Bos have survived, with copies in pristine condition being exceptionally rare as schoolboys had to continuously hide them from their parents and teachers.

The Dutch name of the format has been resurrected in the 1980s as translation for the English-derived "graphic novel" expression in the literary world as explained above. Mazure's Dick Bos has been given a temporary second lease on life, when Panda Uitgeverij form Hans Matla, who considers the series a Dutch comic classic (as did his clientele apparently, as his expensive deluxe edition had rapidly sold out), reissued the entire series in a limited bibliophilic 19-volume edition in the period 2005–2014.

=== Comic Magazines ("Strip bladen") ===
Dutch comics magazines used to have covers of the same paper as the rest of the magazine, they tended to be rather anthology like, with several short stories and/or episodes from long ones. Many of those stories were collected and reprinted in the below-mentioned album format. It was rather common for the magazines to contain a mix of Dutch material and imported stories, though the few surviving ones, such as Tina, (new) Eppo and StripGlossy currently almost exclusively feature native creations.

As it has in the rest of comic reading western Europe, the comic magazine format, started to wane in popularity from the second half of the 1970s onward after the heyday of the format in the 1950s-1960s, made visible by steadily decreasing circulation numbers experienced by all comic magazines. The breakout success of the album format from the early 1970s onward was actually one of the reasons of the decline, as readers increasingly preferred to have their titles presented to them in whole, with fans more and more unwilling to pay for their favorite series twice, as they were by now invariably released as albums after magazine publication, or as editor-in-chief Dirk Snoodijk has worded it in 1999, when his magazine Striparazzi – the penultimate reincarnation of Eppo magazine – went defunct, "The youth is more preoccupied than ever. However, the biggest competitor of the comic magazine is the comic album. We have in effect dug our own grave. Over the years, more and more albums were being published; Readers rather want to spend their money on albums than on magazines." Furthermore, the entire comic phenomenon had to increasingly compete with an ever-expanding alternative range of pass-time options, most conspicuously television and home media formats, later augmented with the various products and services of the digital age. A series of economic crises in the last four decades only aggravated the situation for the comic magazine format. Exemplary of the trend was not only the very short lifespan of such magazines as Wham, Titanic, MYX, the various revitalization attempts of the original Eppo magazine and others conceived in the late 1970s-1990s, but also the demise of one of the longest surviving Dutch-language comic magazines, Robbedoes. When the magazine finally threw in the towel in 2005, circulation had dwindled to a mere 2000-3000 subscription only copies for both Flanders and the Netherlands, with the publisher not even been able to find a distributor for newsstand sales in its final years, having even been removed from their selections by the Dutch "leesmap" companies as explained below.

Of the older Dutch-language comic magazines, it has been Donald Duck that has best managed to hold its own during the decades of decline, not in the least due to its continued place in the selections of "leesmap" companies, though it too has started to show sharply declining circulation numbers from 2000 onward, which is, aside from the growing availability of digital pass-times for the very young as well, also partly due to the changing demographics of the country (declining birthrate) and partly due to the diminishing popularity of the "leesmap". The other long-time survivor, Tina, was sold by publisher Oberon to Finnish media conglomerate Sanoma who changed the formula of the magazine from a purely comic magazine to a hybrid, featuring articles and editorials of interest to the teen-age girl target group with comics now occupying a subordinated place, and succeeded in making the magazine more relevant for modern girls. However, like Donald Duck, Tina too is faced with a declining circulation for the same reasons.

==== The "Leesmap" phenomenon ====
The early-1960s saw the advent of a typical Dutch dissemination phenomenon called the "Leesmap" or the "Leesportefeuille", which in English loosely translates as "Reading portfolio". Vaguely reminiscent of the public library system, the phenomenon concerned a lending format, entailing a number of weekly magazines, collected in a folder – hence the "portefeuille" or "map" (both translating into "portfolio") designation – that could be borrowed on subscription basis for a week from a company providing the service, of which there were many in the country. Home delivered and collected by a dedicated "Bladenman" ("Magazineman", effectively a newly invented job), employed by the magazine lending company, the typically one to two dozen magazines included in the portfolio, were composed with the at the time typical composition of the average Dutch household in mind, to wit, father, mother and children. The format turned out to be immensely popular in the Netherlands, becoming a staple in Dutch households and waiting rooms for decades to come, as it meant that households could take out a simultaneous subscription on a substantial number of magazines at a hugely reduced rate when compared to individual magazine subscriptions, and turned out to be a solution for those households not able or willing to take out individual magazine subscriptions. The subscription fees were highest for the most current magazine issues, but diminished as they became older – subscribers being offered the age option – with the oldest ones (typically when they were three months or so in circulation) offered for keepsake at a sharply reduced rate to the last borrowers in line.

With the children of a household in mind, there were as standard in all reading portfolios, regardless which company they originated from, four comic magazines included; Donald Duck for the very (pre-adolescent) young, Tina for the girls, and either Robbedoes and Kuifje (typically for the Catholic south of the country) or Pep and Sjors (typically for the Protestant north of the country) for the boys, but never any other combination of the latter two pairings for copyright reasons. That being said and often overlooked by Dutch comic scholars themselves, the "leesmap" phenomenon, because of its widespread dissemination, has been of critical importance for the Dutch comic scene as it had introduced entire generations to the world of Franco-Belgian inspired comics, a market penetration it would never have achieved had it been solely reliant on individual magazine subscriptions and/or newsstand sales only, and in the process negating much of the lingering negative impression of the medium the 1948 incident had left on popular awareness as a happy aside by Pep in particular, as related above. The phenomenon is still quite popular in the country, though not as much as it had been in the 1960s-1980s. Yet it is the single most important reason why Tina and Donald Duck magazines even still exist in the Dutch language in the first place, and the primary explanation why Kuifje and Robbedoes magazines held out for so long as they did, the general downward trend from the 1980s onward notwithstanding, because of the assured turnover from the "leesmap" companies. The latter two magazines actually enjoyed an extended lease of life, when Sjors and Pep were merged into Eppo in 1975 because their publishers themselves had merged three years earlier. As most "leesmap" companies were loath to break the mold of having four comic magazines included for the children in the household, the companies in the north decided to proceed henceforth with Robbedoes and Kuifje for the most part as well, until Kuifje became defunct itself in 1993, resulting in the removal of Robbedoes – which managed to linger on until 2005 on its own – from the magazine selections as well. Illustrative of the Dutch magazines losing their place in the "leesmap", were their circulation numbers; Sjors and Pep had circulations of 156,172 and 128,824 copies respectively in 1974, Eppo featured a sharply reduced circulation of 197,069 copies in 1977 one year into its existence.

Currently, Tina and Donald Duck magazines are the only comics magazines still included in the "leesmaps", which goes a long way explaining their longevity, despite being confronted with a sharply diminishing circulation as well, in effect keeping pace with the gradual diminishing popularity of the "leesmap".

=== Comic books ===
"Comic book" translates into Dutch as "stripboek", and has as such been in use in colloquial Dutch in the 1960s through the 1970s for the standard US format derived comic book format. It however has as translation become obsolete for the format thereafter as the Dutch expression is currently exclusively reserved for the hereafter mentioned album format and the aforementioned, albeit less common, oblong format. The directly from the US format derived comic book, came into being in the late 1950s for Dutch comics when the picture novels had disappeared as a result of the craze against them. It lasted for some time, enjoying its heyday as a translated format in the early 1970s – the publications of Classics Lektuur having been the prime example, with Juniorpress coming in second to a lesser extent – , but has all but disappeared in translation since then, supplanted by the more popular native and Franco-Belgian comic albums. Aside from this, there was actually a second reason for the demise of the translated versions; After the war, English became increasingly the preferred choice as second language in the Netherlands (exemplified by the fact that many primary schools and colleges in the country currently offer their students bi-lingual courses), replacing German and especially French as such, and with the vast majority of the population having nowadays at least a basic understanding of English, readers prefer to read their American (and British) comic books in the original language. Consequently, comic books, the adopted English expression now exclusively in use for the original format, are therefore still being read and sold in the Netherlands, but these are predominantly untranslated US and, to a lesser degree, British imports. Translations on behalf of younger readers are still in vogue for the comic adaptations of popular movie franchises, the Marvel Comics and Star Wars franchises in particular, as currently released by publishers Standaard Uitgeverij and relative newcomer Dark Dragon Books (Dutch despite English name) respectively. But, while the dimensions of their releases approximate those of the classic US comic book the page count invariably far exceeds the traditional 32 page format, aside from lacking any and all forms of advertising, and should therefore be considered as translations of what is currently understood the US graphic novel format.

=== Comic pocket books ("Strip pockets") and pulp comics ===
A format that was particularly popular in the Netherlands in the 1970s were the so-called "strip pockets", introduced in the late 1960s and originally conceived in Great Britain and Italy. As the name already implies it was a mass market paperback softcover format with its dimensions located between the picture novel and comic book. Typically, these pockets were printed in black and white on low-grade paper, reflected as such in their relatively low retail prices, with the panel count limited to 1-4 per page and predominantly sold as newsstand sales with series volumes released on a bi-weekly or monthly basis. One of the most popular mainstream series in the format became the monthly Italian Tex Willer Western series, published by Classics Lectuur, which ran for 128 volumes from 1971 until 1980. However, it was as equally a popular format for the publication of pulp comics ("pulp strips") as released by not only Classics Lectuur, but also by such publishers as De Schorpioen, De Vrijbuiter and Baldakijn Boeken, particularly in the Crime, War, Western, and, for the girls and to a lesser extent, Romantic genres, which were predominantly created by anonymous Italian, Spanish or British studio artists. Pursuant the cultural changes of the 1960s and in an ironic turn of events, violent, often sadistic comics laced with gratuitous sex like Bloederige verhalen, Hessa or Wallestein het monster of mostly Italian origin (such as those as released by publisher Edifumetto whose releases featured cover art by such artists as Fernando Carcupino or Alessandro Biffignandi) and published by the same publishers alongside their more mainstream releases – sharing the same measure of popularity – , also made a comeback with a vengeance in the format, being far more graphic and explicit than the picture novels had ever been, and which had the country in such an uproar back in 1948. The pulp mainstream comics went out of vogue in the early 1980s, followed a few years later by the more gratuitous ones after their novelty factor had worn off upon the arrival of the VHS video tape on which similar, more "lively" fare was offered, and the format as such has all but vanished from the Dutch comic scene, along with their publishers. Tex Willer, whose original release run was executed in a slightly larger dimension with slightly sturdier softcovers for the express purpose to differentiate them from the pulp comics, has made a recent come back nonetheless, but now in the bonafide album format. As a book format though, the comic pocket book has, and is, also been occasionally used by all major comic publishers for some of their publications, invariably in a higher quality and in color, though they remain rarities in comparison to the album format, excepting such releases by the Dutch Disney Studios. No native artists are known by name to have specifically created original comics for this particular format, again excepting those (anonymous) artists working for the Dutch Disney Studios.

=== Comic albums ("Stripboeken" or "Stripalbums") ===
The "stripalbum" was conceived as a roughly A4 paper-sized format – with a traditional page-count of either 48 pages or, less commonly, 64 pages – in the world of Belgian comics in the early 1930s with the first Les Aventures de Tintin (Kuifje) albums from publisher Casterman, and introduced in the Netherlands shortly after the war, initially as Flemish imports, particularly those from Casterman and Dupuis. Dutch publishers Spaarnestad and De Geïllustreerde Pers (under its Amsterdam Boek imprint for the translated import comics) started to chime in from the mid-1960s onward with comic album publications of their own, both translated imports as well as native productions as published in their respective magazines Sjors and Pep. Album production gathered steam when Le Lombard entered the fray around 1969–1970 with their Dutch-language album releases, for over a decade licensed to Dutch printer/publisher Uitgeverij Helmond for the Netherlands (in-between for a very short 1973-1975 period of time to the unsuccessful Dutch branch of Swedish Semic Press), and really took off when the comics divisions of the two Dutch publishers upon their merger in 1972 were concentrated into the newly established specialized comics publishing house Uitgeverij Oberon BV, the first of its kind for mainstream European comics in the Netherlands, akin to their Franco-Belgian counterparts, and the country's second specialized comic publisher after Classics Lectuur. In the process Oberon also became the Dutch licensed publisher for the French Dargaud albums (Le Lombard for Flanders), after their own short-lived 1973-1975 dalliance with Semic Press, due to the fact that their Pilote comics were already being published in Pep magazine – actually retracing their steps as they had already licensed album publication to Amsterdam Boek previously.

That Lombard and Dargaud had to align themselves with Dutch, or Dutch-based publishers for their album releases, instead of releasing them directly themselves, had partly to do with the then applicable copyrights laws as the European Single Market was not yet in place at the time, and partly to do with the fact that neither as relative newcomers had yet their own international distribution networks in place, explaining their close cooperation in the era on the Francophone market as well. The far older and more established publishers Dupuis and Casterman (both originally book publishers) on the other hand, had already circumvented legalities by establishing local subsidiaries in the Dutch towns of Sittard (Uitgeverij Dupuis NV) and Dronten (Casterman Nederland BV) respectively, which were made defunct as soon as the single market came into being at the start of 1993. Previously, Lombard and Dargaud had already severed the ties with their respective Dutch partners a decade earlier, by making use of the provisions embedded in the Benelux treaty, a localized preamble of the single market, comprising Belgium, the Netherlands and Luxembourg (hence the Benelux acronym), with Dargaud establishing a subsidiary in the Belgian capital Brussels as Dargaud Benelux NV (Dutch)/SA (French, and thus circumventing the fact that Dargaud was a French publisher), already the seat of Lombard, currently known as Dargaud-Lombard NV/SA after both companies were acquired and subsequently merged by French holding company Média-Participations. Nonetheless, the four Franco-Belgian publishers were alongside Oberon, the predominant album publishers in the country in the 1970s-1980s era, at the time occasionally referred to as "The Big Five" by the reporters of comic journal Stripschrift. Yet, the earliest known releases recognizable as modern comic albums, as in modeled after the early Tintin albums, were neither imports from Casterman nor those from Dupuis, but rather those of Spaarnestad who already started to release native Sjors & Sjimmie comic albums from the mid-1930s onward. Spaarnestad incidentally, released its albums predominantly as hardcovers before becoming Oberon, unlike De Geïllustreerde Pers, after which the softcover format became the Dutch album norm for decades to come.

Most published comics are now published in the album format, like their Franco-Belgian counterparts, the majority of album titles currently released in the Netherlands actually still being translations of the latter. And while the 48 page-count is still the norm, aberrant page-count publications, especially for the European-style graphic novels, have become more commonplace similar to their aforementioned Franco-Belgian counterparts. Having become the dominant publication format for comics, albums came to be considered the equivalents of books from the late 1970s onward when comic albums too started to receive ISBN numbers, their status a decade later reinforced with the slowly increasing acceptance of the hardcover comic album format, the Franco-Belgian album standard, alongside the hitherto Dutch album norm, the softcover format, as customer option. Unlike magazines, they have no cover date and are often reprinted. They, when part of a series, also follow a specific chronological order and are thus collectable. Like it has in the originating world of Franco-Belgian comics, the vast majority of new titles are currently released directly in album format without prior magazine publication, as the serialized magazine publication format has sharply waned in popularity due to changing tastes and preferences of readership, as well as for other socio-economic reasons. It has been observed by European comics studies scholars that Americans originally used the expression "graphic novel" to describe everything that deviated from their standard, 32-page comic book format, meaning that as a format, all European larger-sized, longer comic albums, regardless of their contents, fell under the heading as far as Americans were concerned.

== Current status ==
Contemporary Dutch comics operate now in much the same way as they did in the 1960s through to the 1980s. Imports, the small press circuit, reprints, online comics, Donald Duck comics, and Children's comics are still prevailing. Several prominent comic artists of the 1960s - 1980s of this kind are still producing work, and remain culturally relevant, their newer works are predominantly reliant on the small press circuit for their publication.

As an art form, the comic phenomenon in the Netherlands was never able to fully escape from under the long shadow the 1948 incident had cast (see Hanco Kolk's below quoted 2016 remark) – even though the specifics of said incident, both cause and fall-out, are nowadays all but forgotten by contemporaries. It therefore has neither achieved the revered status of "Le Neuvième Art", the medium has in its southern neighbors Belgium and France, nor has it been accorded the formal recognition as such by cultural authorities – the creations of Marten Toonder and Joost Swarte excepted to some extent, as both men have received royal knighthoods, albeit only for (illustrated) literature and visual arts (its strips origins notwithstanding) manifestation respectively, instead as being awarded for comics – , or seen as such by Dutch society at large. Exemplary of the latter, was the television series Wordt Vervolgd (television) (not affiliated in any way with the 1980s-1990s graphic novel magazine of the same title), which ran from 1983 through 1993 on Dutch television. Intended by its conceivers (which included Dutch comic scholar Kees de Bree) to become a serious, mature program on comics, it was quickly whittled down by broadcaster AVRO, that aired it, into a children's program, changing the focus from comics to cartoons. Also, the Stripmuseum – conceived as Holland's answer to Brussels' prestigious Belgisch Centrum voor het Beeldverhaal – already ran into trouble in 2014, threatened with bankruptcy and closure, date of closure already fixed on May 1, 2014. The Stripmuseum has never come close to the visitor numbers its Belgian counterpart achieved (less than 50,000 and dwindling v.s. a steady 200,000 annually). The museum's demise was temporarily averted for three years with eleventh-hour emergency funding from local authorities, though the museum has been notified to move in 2017 to smaller premises, having to share it with other institutions. Additionally, after the 1970s-1980s boom years, the number of both comic magazines as well as comic book outlets started to dwindle noticeably from 2000 onward – seriously curtailing the development of, and publication opportunities for, Dutch comic talent as comic creators Hanco Kolk and Jean-Marc van Tol warned for in an urgent open letter, published in the newspaper NRC Handelsblad of September 27, 2008 – , though socio-economic factors were mostly in play for that trend, the 2007-2011 Great Recession becoming the most obvious one.

Despite the reluctance of cultural authorities to become engaged with comics – who in effect have never formally rescinded Rutten's 1948 missive, meaning that it is, legally at least, still in force as an official ministry directive and actually still adhered to by some Bevindelijk gereformeerden communities located in Holland's small but discernible Bible Belt – , the letter from Kolk and van Tol did initiate some action from a latter-day successor of Theo Rutten, Minister of Education and Culture Ronald Plasterk. Plasterk appointed comic scholar and journalist Gert Jan Pos as the "stripintendant" (=comics intermediary) for his ministry in 2009, with a relatively modest annual budget of €250,000 to advance the medium as a cultural phenomenon. A somewhat half-hearted attempt and with the country in the throes of a severe economic recession, it was from the start intended as a two-year temporary measure only, though Pos (in conjuncture with Kolk) did manage in the window of time allotted to him to get the Netherlands its first and only "Comic Design" learning course at the "ArtEZ Art & Design Zwolle" art academy in the city of Zwolle (though it has remained a modest affair compared to the prestigious "Beeldverhaal" course of the Belgian "Hogeschool Sint-Lukas Brussel"), but failing at the same time to change the attitudes of other agencies and institutions that concerned themselves with the advancement of printed media, unable to get "strips" on their agendas, most notably that of Holland's most important book organization "Collectieve Propaganda van het Nederlandse Boek". By 2012 all state support had ceased; "The government is a fickle partner," Pos sighed after he was let go from the ministry, with Kolk, indirectly referring to the 1948 incident, adding, "The comic had already in the 1950s been the ugly duckling [in the cultural landscape]. It has always remained so," contrasting it to the radically different situation in France and Belgium where the medium receives ample and continuous support from their respective cultural authorities. In 2016, NRC, the same newspaper that had published Kolk's and van Tol's letter eight years earlier, took stock of the situation in the Dutch comic world and found the authors' then assessment validated by concluding, especially in comparison with the comic scene in southern neighbor Belgium, that the Dutch comic world had indeed become barren, to an extent only kept afloat by veteran mainstays such as Peter Pontiac and Dick Matena. The career of Matena in this respect was illustrative for the downturn the Dutch comic world had experienced after the 1990s; had he been an influential and innovative creator in the field of Dutch graphic novels in the 1980s-1990s, by 2000 he had all but abandoned his own creations, instead, and despite receiving acclaim for them, concentrating on pouring the biographies of historical figures from the worlds of art and literature, as well as works of Dutch literature into the comic format. Matena has voiced his frustration over this in the hereafter mentioned 2014 television documentary, aptly titled "Dick is boos" ("Dick is angry").

=== Recent developments ===
In this light, Dutch television has made amends for Wordt Vervolgd by on occasion broadcasting mature documentaries on Dutch comic creators such as Peter Pontiac (VPRO, January 8, 2003 and Avrotros, June 1, 2014), Dick Matena (NPO, November 13, 2014) and Martin Lodewijk (NTR, April 23, 2015). Yet, it was Jean-Marc van Tol himself who to a large extent fulfilled the vision the conceivers of Wordt Vervolgd originally had for their television production with his own 2011 Beeldverhaal series, he produced and presented for public broadcaster VPRO as a spin-off of their own literary VPRO Boeken series. The series, which aired from 17 October to 17 December 2011, consisted of fifteen 35-minute weekly episodes, exploring the comic phenomenon in the Netherlands, including the outside influences it had undergone, in particular from US, and Franco-Belgian comics in two separate episodes. Still, the number of these comic related documentaries are still in no comparison with the numbers as aired in France and Belgium.

There was even a second Dutch comic museum in the making, which opened its doors on September 3, 2016 as "Strips! Museum" in the city of Rotterdam with Rotterdam native Martin Lodewijk presiding the opening ceremony. February 2016 saw the launch of the quarterly magazine StripGlossy from publisher Uitgeverij Personalia. As the name already suggests, the magazine is executed as a glossy lifestyle-like publication with space exclusively reserved for Dutch comic talents, both old and new, and the first of its kind in decades, somewhat alleviating the concerns Kolk and van Tol had expressed back in 2008. While these developments are in themselves hopeful, it is as of 2017 still too soon to speak of a resurgence in the Dutch comic world, only exemplified by the Rotterdam comic museum already having to file for bankruptcy on July 25, 2017, less than a year after its opening.

== Famous series and artists ==
- Agent 327 (Martin Lodewijk)
- De Argonautjes (Dick Matena)
- Barbaraal (Barbara Stok)
- Baron van Tast (Jan van Haasteren)
- Bernard Voorzichtig (Daan Jippes)
- Birre Beer (Phiny Dick, Ton Beek, Andries Brandt, Eiso Toonder)
- Boes (Wil Raymakers, Thijs Wilms)
- Burkababes (Peter de Wit)
- Claire (Wilbert Plijnaar, Jan van Die, Robert van der Kroft)
- Dick Bos (Alfred Mazure)
- DirkJan (Mark Retera)
- Douwe Dabbert (Piet Wijn, Thom Roep)
- Eric de Noorman (Hans G. Kresse)
- F.C. Knudde (Toon van Driel)
- De Familie Doorzon (Gerrit de Jager)
- De Familie Fortuin (Peter de Wit)
- Flipje (Harmsen van der Beek)
- Flippie Flink (Clinge Doorenbos, Robert Raemaekers)
- Fokke & Sukke (Bastiaan Geleijnse, John Reid, Jean-Marc Tol)
- Franka (Henk Kuijpers)
- De Generaal (Peter de Smet)
- Gilles de Geus (Hanco Kolk, Peter de Wit)
- Gutsman (Erik Kriek)
- Haagse Harry (Marnix Rueb)
- Heinz (René Windig, Eddie de Jong)
- Holle Pinkel (Andries Brandt, Piet Wijn)
- Jan, Jans en de kinderen (English: Jack, Jacky and the Juniors) (Jan Kruis)
- Johnny Goodbye (Martin Lodewijk, Patty Klein (art by Italian-Belgian artist Dino Attanasio)
- Joop Klepzeiker (Eric Schreurs)
- Kapitein Rob (Pieter Kuhn)
- Kappie (Marten Toonder, Phiny Dick, Harry van den Eerenbeemt, Paul Biegel, Andries Brandt, Lo Hartog van Banda, Joop Hillenius, Dick Vlottes, Ton Beek, Fred Julsing, Jan van Haasteren, Piet Wijn, Terrt Willers, Richard Klokker)
- Ketelbinkie (Wim Meuldijk)
- Kick Wilstra (Henk Sprenger)
- Koning Hollewijn (Marten Toonder, Eiso Toonder, Andries Brandt, Ben van Voorn, Ton Beek, Ben van 't Klooster, Jan Wesseling, Harry van de Eerenbeemt, Fred Julsing, Thé Tjong-Khing, Frits Godhelp, Richard Klokkers, Lo Hartog van Banda, Piet Wijn)
- Kraaienhove (Willy Lohmann)
- Oktoknopie (Gerard Leever)
- Olle Kapoen (Phiny Dick)
- Meccano (Hanco Kolk)
- Minter en Hinter (Paul Biegel, Dick Vlottes)
- De Avonturen van Pa Pinkelman (Carol Voges, Godfried Bomans)
- Panda (Marten Toonder)
- Paulus the woodgnome (Jan van Oort)
- Pinkie Pienter (J.H. Koeleman)
- Piloot Storm (Henk Sprenger)
- Professor Pi (Bob van den Born)
- Roel Dijkstra - (Jan Steeman, Andries Brandt)
- Roel en zijn beestenboel - (Gerrit de Jager, Wim Stevenhagen, Wim Schaasberg)
- Scribbly (Jan-Paul Arends)
- Sigmund (Peter de Wit)
- S1NGLE (Hanco Kolk, Peter de Wit)
- Sjef van Oekel (Theo van den Boogaard, Wim T. Schippers)
- Sjors en Sjimmie (Frans Piët, Robert van der Kroft, Wilbert Plijnaar, Jan van Die, Patty Klein)
- Storm (Don Lawrence)
- Tekko Taks (Henk Kabos
- Tom Poes (Marten Toonder)
- Tripje en Liezebertha (Henk Backer)
- Ukkie (Fred Julsing)
- Vader & Zoon (Peter van Straaten)
- Van Nul tot Nu (Co Loerakker, Thom Roep)
- Yoebje en Achmed (Henk Backer)
- Zusje (Gerrit de Jager)
