= Kapitein Rob =

Dutch comic strip

Publication information
- Genre: Adventure comics, Nautical comics, Time travel comics, Historical comics
- Publication date: December 11, 1945 – January 21, 1966

Creative team
- Written by: Evert Werkman
- Artist(s): Pieter Kuhn

Kapitein Rob ("Captain Rob") was a Dutch adventure comic strip, created and drawn by Pieter Kuhn and written by journalist Evert Werkman. The series ran from December 11, 1945 until January 21, 1966. Together with Marten Toonder's Tom Poes and Hans G. Kresse's Eric de Noorman it is considered to be among the Big Three in the history of Dutch comics.

== Concept ==
Kapitein Rob is a sea captain. He owns a sailing ship nicknamed De Vrijheid (The Freedom) and an invention called "Historisch Oog" ("Historical Eye"), which allows him to travel back in time and have adventures in previous centuries involving pirates and explorers. Among the historical characters he encountered are Olivier van Noort and Jan van Riebeeck. Fantasy elements were also prominent in the series. In one story Rob was confronted with the legendary phantom ship The Flying Dutchman. In some stories Rob's ship even leaves the sea and travels into outer space.

In Het Geheim van de Bosplaat Rob discovers a secret bunker on the isle of Terschelling, where nazi's plan their evil schemes.

== Characters ==
- Kapitein Rob: A young, brave and smart pipe smoking sea captain. Rob started sailing in May 1940, when he was 21 years old. His father died that same year in a shipwreck, on May 13, 1940.
- Skip: Rob's Samoyed dog, whom he rescued from a sinking German ship near Murmansk.
- Paula: Rob's wife, with whom he married in 1954.
- Robbie and Josje: Rob and Paul's children.
- Kees: Rob's long lost brother, who supposedly died in a shipwreck. He finds him back on the isle of Tamoa, where he was treated as a king by the local tribesmen and married Suja, the chieftain's daughter.
- Professor Lupardi: An evil professor and Rob's arch enemy. He wants to conquer the world and often invents new scientific devices.
- Yoto: Lupardi's assistant.

== Publication history ==
The stories were published in the Dutch newspaper Het Parool. Like all Dutch comics in the 1940s and 1950s Kapitein Rob was a text comic, where the text was written below the images. This allowed the stories to be represented as Rob's personal captain's log. The comic strip was a huge success and published in oblong format. Apart from "Het Parool" Rob's adventures were also published in the "Ketelbinkiekrant" (1948–1957) and his own magazine, titled "Kapitein Rob's Vrienden" ("Captain Rob's Friends") (1949–1952), later renamed as: "Rob's Vrienden" ("Rob's Friends") (1952–1957). The stories were also quite successful in Belgium at the time and were translated in German and French.

The series ran from December 11, 1945 until January 21, 1966. The script of the first story was written by Wijnanda Aberson. Evert Werkman took over from the second story on. The series was only interrupted twice. From April 4, 1955 until September 1, 1956 and from November 8, 1958 until August 25, 1959. After Kuhn died of a heart attack in 1966 the series were terminated. In total 73 stories were published. The final one was left unfinished.

In 2001 the entire series were republished completely by Rijperman Communications. On May 15, 2014 the entire collection of Kuhn's drawings, including Kapitein Rob, was donated to the archives of the city Groningen.

== In popular culture ==
=== Musical adaptation ===
In 1996 Kapitein Rob was adapted into a musical. The musical was organized by Gerard Knap. Hans Mobach composed the music, Rudolf Geel wrote the song lyrics. Ruud Bos wrote the dialogues. Erik van Muiswinkel was choreographer. The play premiered in the presence of Dutch politician Annemarie Jorritsma, who was Minister of Transport, Public Works and Water Management at the time.

=== Film adaptation ===
In 2007 Simon de Waal directed a live-action film adaptation, Kapitein Rob en het Geheim van Professor Lupardi. De Waal and Hans Pos wrote the story, while Screenpartners and Shooting Star Filmcompany produced the picture.
