= Toon van Driel =

Dutch cartoonist and comics artist

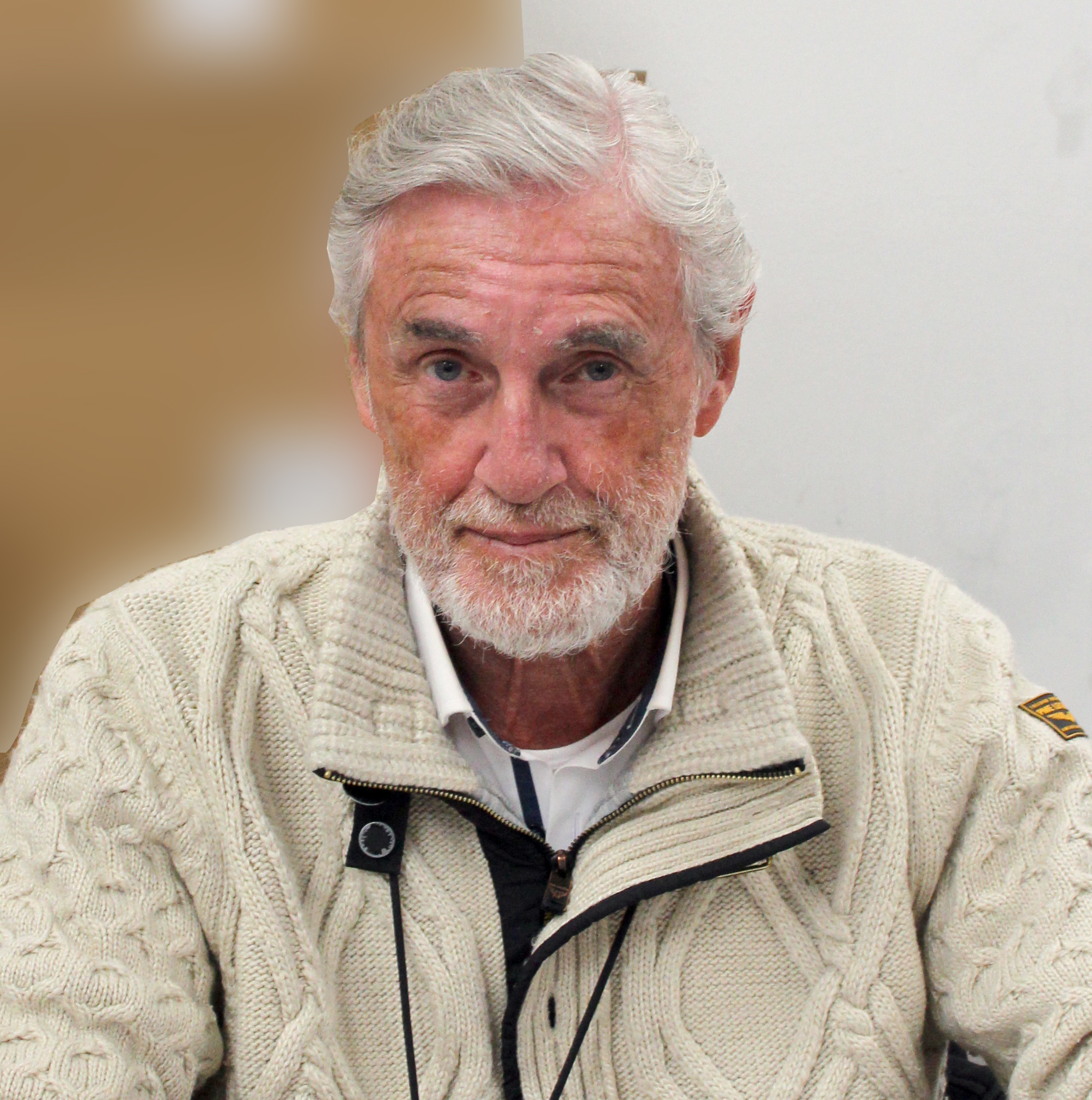
Toon van Driel (2025)

Toon van Driel (born 16 February 1945, Amsterdam) is a Dutch cartoonist, comics writer and comics artist, best known for his comics series F.C. Knudde, about an incompetent association football team, and De Stamgasten, which features anthropomorphic animals telling corny jokes in a bar. He is the winner of the 1988 Stripschapprijs. Van Driel was also the original writer of Eric Schreurs' comic strip Joop Klepzeiker.
