= Lo Hartog van Banda =

Dutch comics writer (1916–2006)

Lodewijk Hartog van Banda
- Born: 4 November 1916 The Hague, Netherlands
- Died: 2 February 2006 (aged 89) The Hague, Netherlands
- Area: Writer
- Pseudonym: Lo
- Notable works: Panda, Tom Puss, Koning Hollewijn, Arman en Ilva, Lucky Luke
- Awards: Stripschapprijs

Lodewijk Hartog van Banda (4 November 1916, in The Hague – 2 February 2006, in The Hague) was a Dutch comics writer.

He lived in the Dutch East Indies during the 1930s and early 1940s; when the Netherlands went to war with German and then Japan, he was arrested for being a Conscientious objector and ended up spending the war in an internment camp in Surinam called Jodensavanne

Working for the Toonder Studio, he co-wrote Aram, Kappie, Panda, Tom Puss and his own creation Koning Hollewijn. When Marten Toonder went to Ireland, Lo Hartog van Banda left the studio. Later he would write the scripts for comics such as Arad en Maya, Arman en Ilva, and Ambrosius. Many of his scripts have a satirical tone.

Arman en Ilva was published widely in daily newspapers all across Europe. It was an eerie and disturbing science fiction future, with the young Arman and his blonde girlfriend Ilva troubleshooting for various potentates and space pirates. While not on missions, they were being seduced by people of both sexes whose wish was to assassinate them if they were to be refused.

He wrote for the NOS television the TV series Tita Tovenaar, De Astronautjes, and De Bereboot.

In 1975 he won the Dutch Stripschapprijs, a prize awarded to comic writers and cartoonists for their career work.

Outside the Netherlands he is probably best known for his three Lucky Luke stories, Fingers, Nitroglycérine, and Chasse aux fantômes.
