= Nederlands Stripmuseum =

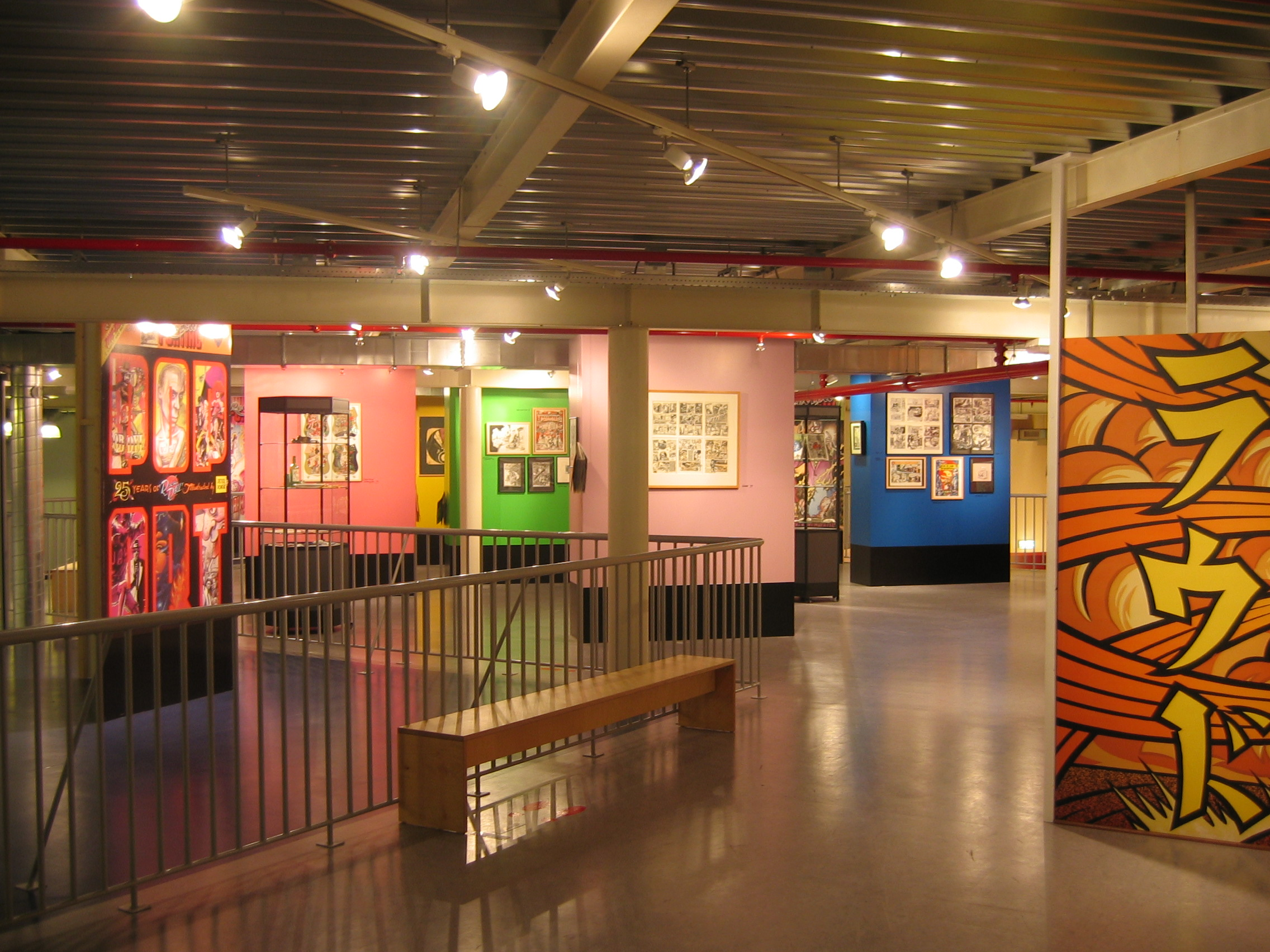
- Exhibition in 2005

- Location in Groningen in the Netherlands
- Established: 21 April 2004
- Dissolved: 2 March 2019
- Location: Westerhaven 71; Groningen, Netherlands
- Coordinates: 53°13′N 6°33′E
- Visitors: 19,790 (2015)
- Owners: nl:Libéma (premises); Stichting het Nederlands Stripmuseum (collection)
- Public transit access: Westerhaven; Bus lines: 6, 8, 9, 35, 39, 88, 637
- Website: www.stripmuseum.nl

The Nederlands Stripmuseum (Dutch pronunciation: [ˈneːdərlɑnts ˈstrɪpmyˌzeːjʏm]; "Netherlands Comic Strip Museum") was a museum dedicated to Dutch language comic strips, with emphasis on native comic creations, and located in the city of Groningen in the Netherlands.

== Overview ==
Over a decade in the making, the museum was opened on 21 April 2004, by city mayor Jacques Wallage, with expected visitor numbers in the 40.000 to 100.000 range annually. At the opening, attended by many alumni from the Dutch comic scene, then museum chairman Bert Brink declared that it was justified that the museum was housed in Groningen, as the Dutch comic culture had its origins in the city. Around 1850 the comic Monsieur Cryptogame from Rodolphe Töpffer was translated into Dutch as Mijnheer Prikkebeen by city native, poet and novelist J.J.A. Goeverneur. The translation was also published in Groningen. The museum had 19,790 visitors in 2015.

The premises in which the museum is housed is not owned by the museum or the city, but rented from real-estate managing company nl:Libéma. The collection though, is the legal responsibility of a private foundation, the "Stichting het Nederlands Stripmuseum".

Conceived as Holland's answer to Brussels' prestigious Belgisch Centrum voor het Beeldverhaal, the Stripmuseum has never come close to the visitor numbers as projected, or to the numbers its Belgian counterpart did achieve (less than 50,000 and dwindling v.s. a steady 200,000 annually). As a result, the Stripmuseum already ran into trouble in 2014, threatened with bankruptcy and closure, date of closure fixed on May 1, 2014. The museum's demise was temporarily averted for three years with eleventh-hour emergency funding from local authorities and sympathetic sponsors, but has been notified by its landlord Libéma to vacate the premises in 2017. Pursuant its averted bankruptcy, the museum had already planned moving to the smaller Groninger Forum premises as early as 2014, which is as of 2017, expected to open its doors in 2019, even if that means having to share the available space with other institutions. Libéma actually already wanted to expel the museum in 2014 in anticipation of the bankruptcy, but was persuaded to rescind by the donors who had saved the museum to await the then projected opening of the Groninger Forum in 2017. A spokesperson of Libéma has indicated that the museum will not get a stay of eviction this time in anticipation of the opening of the Groninger Forum, which has already been delayed by two years.

== Visitors ==
Year	Visitors	Year	Visitors
2004	N/A	2010	43,000
2005	45,037	2011	41,000
2006	45,000	2012	40,318
2007	37,000	2013	34,000
2008	39,000	2014	22,000
2009	41,000	2015	19,790
