= Tom Puss =

Dutch comic strip

- Oliver B. Bumble (left) and Tom Puss (right)
- Author: Marten Toonder
- Current status/schedule: Discontinued
- Launch date: March 16, 1941
- End date: January 20, 1986
- Syndicate(s): Oberon, Panda, Big Balloon
- Genre(s): Action, adventure, satire

Tom Puss (Tom Poes in Dutch) is a Dutch comic strip, created by Marten Toonder. Together with Hans G. Kresse's Eric de Noorman and Pieter Kuhn's Kapitein Rob, it is regarded as the Big Three of Dutch comics.

Tom Poes was a talking animal comic, published in text comics format. The main protagonists are Tom Poes, a white cat, and his best friend, the bear lord Oliver B. Bumble (Olivier B. Bommel in Dutch). The series is sometimes referred to as the Bommelsaga as well. Toonder received many awards and honorary distinctions for both his illustrations and literary output. In the Netherlands Tom Poes became regarded as a work of literature.

== Origins ==
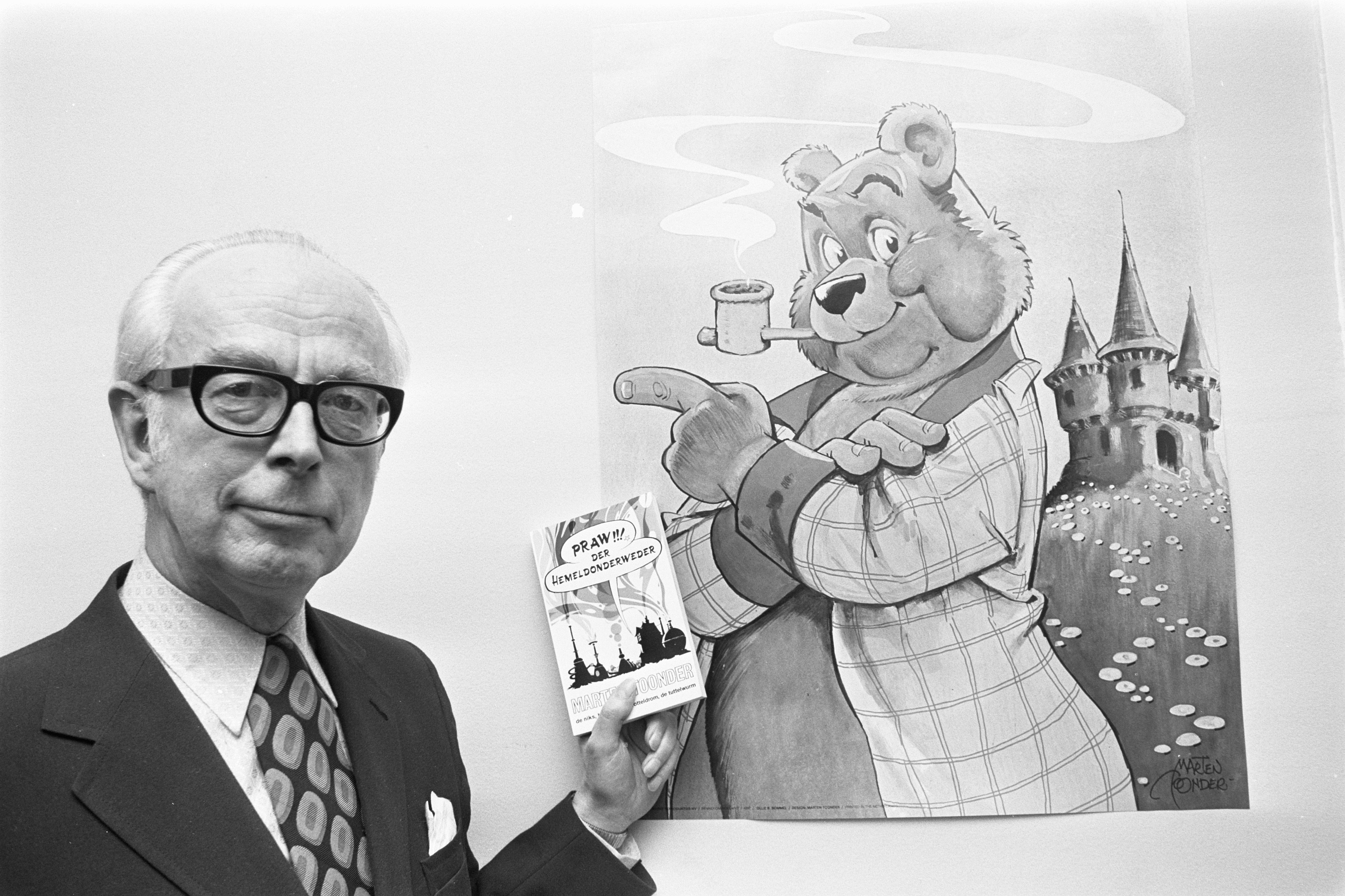
Marten Toonder with Oliver B. Bumble

In 1931 Marten Toonder was in Buenos Aires, Argentina, where he met Jim Davis, a former assistant of Pat Sullivan and Otto Messmer, creators of Felix the Cat, who taught him some lessons in drawing comics.

On March 16, 1941, the first Tom Poes comic, Het Geheim der Blauwe Aarde ("The Secret of the Blue Earth") was published in the newspaper De Telegraaf, written and drawn by Toonder, replacing the Mickey Mouse comic in 1941. Tom Poes himself was already created in July 1939.

The name of the character is a pun on the Dutch pastry "tompouce" and was thought up by Toonder's wife, Phiny Dick. On December 18 of that same year the series was published in the two-weekly Czech magazine Punta. After the war the stories were published in NRC Handelsblad, De Volkskrant, Ons Vrij Nederland, Revue and Donald Duck. In daily newspapers Tom Poes was published as a text comic, like most Dutch comics at the time. In the weekly magazines it was published in balloon format.

Tom Poes features many anthropomorphic characters who are satirical representations of animal stereotypes, though some human characters like gnomes and wizards exist too. The series is set in a fantasy world of an undetermined age. Some elements are modern, like cars and television sets, others are more reminiscent of older centuries.

Tom Poes was originally a children's comic, but as the stories progressed they aimed at a more adult audience by introducing satirical elements and eccentric use of language. Several of Toonder's words and expressions became neologisms in the Dutch language. In 1954 Toonder became member of the Maatschappij der Nederlandse Letterkunde ("Society of Dutch literature") and by the time the story De Bovenbazen (The Upper Bosses) was published he was regarded as a creator of genuine quality literature. Tom Poes is still the only comic strip in the Netherlands to have gained such a reputation among the intelligentsia.

The success of the series spread to many merchandising products, including theatrical plays and a comics magazine. Toonder founded his own studio and collected several talented artists to assist him with the drawing of Tom Poes, while he still wrote the stories. Among these were Lo Hartog van Banda, Piet Wijn and Dick Matena. From the time Toonder settled down in Ireland in 1965 to the end of Tom Poes in 1986, Toonder reportedly drew Tom Poes almost singlehandedly, having grown weary of running a large studio.

The series was also translated and published in Belgium, Denmark, England, Finland, France, Germany, Indonesia, Ireland and Sweden.

== Main characters ==
- Tom Puss: A young white cat. He is clever, brave and remains calm in all circumstances. He frequently throws in a critical "Hm!" during conversations with his noble friend.
- Oliver B. Bumble: A brown bear who is a lord who lives in a castle. Oliver often brags about himself, but in reality he is not very bright and panics whenever actual work has to be done or danger is about. Several of his catch phrases have entered the Dutch language, such as "Als je begrijpt wat ik bedoel" ("If you gather my meaning"), "Een eenvoudige, doch voedzame maaltijd" ("A simple, yet nourishing meal") and "Verzin toch een list!" ("Think up a ploy!")

== Supporting characters ==
Dutch names.

- Joost: A white Labrador who serves as Bommel's loyal butler. His catchphrases are: "Met uw welnemen" ("If you allow me") and: "Het is allemaal zeer betreurenswaardig" ("It's all very regrettable"). In several adventures, he quits, but at the end of every adventure he is back at his post, serving dinner.
- Annemarie Doddeltje: A small cat who is Bommel's girlfriend and in full awe and concern about him. They marry in the final story.
- Querulijn Xaverius Marquis de Canteclaer van Barneveldt: A rooster who is Bommel's neighbour. He is a marquis who often uses French and Latin expressions and writes poems. De Canteclaer is very vain and looks down on all his fellow men, especially on Bommel whom he regards as below his league, and not belonging to the nobility like him. His name is a reference to Chanticleer and to Barneveld, a Dutch town famous for its poultry.
- Wammes Waggel: A naïve goose who can't take a thing seriously and just enjoys life as he goes along. He never understands what is going on around him, despite how serious the matter often is. His catchphrase is "Hihi, wat enigjes" ("Teehee, how nicely")
- Officer Bulle Bas: A bull dog who is head of the police. He is prone to aggression and very suspicious. Usually he tries to arrest Bommel and others even though he hardly has any evidence. "Altijd dezelfde" ("Always the same person") and "Wat is je naam, Bommel?" ("What is your name, Bommel?") are some of his standard phrases.
- Brigadier Snuf: A dog who is the right hand of Officer Bulle Bas.
- Bul Super and Hiep Hieper: Two dogs who are crooks. Bul is a bull dog who acts as the boss of the duo. Hieper is a smaller white dog who admires his boss, but is often too panicky to actually take initiative himself.
- Mayor Dirk Dickerdack: A hippopotamus who is mayor of Rommeldam, the characters' home town. He is more concerned about his town than individuals and considers himself above the law.
- Dorknoper: A hamster who works as a civil servant for Mayor Dickerdack. He is very punctual and always wants to do everything according to local law.
- Professor Zbygniew Prlwytzkofsky: One of the few recurring human characters. He is a professor with a long beard who often mixes Dutch and German words in his speech. "Praw! Der hemeldonderweder!" is one of his common phrases.
- Doctorandus Alexander Pieps: A mouse who serves as Prlwytzkofsky's assistant. He often sighs that he'd rather have studied for a different job.
- Captain Wal Rus: A walrus who is a sea captain. He looks down upon everyone who isn't a sailor like him and calls them "overgehaalde landrotten" ("distorted land lubbers"). He always mispronounces Bommel's name.
- Professor Dr. Joachim Sickbock: A goat who is one of the major antagonists. He is a mad scientist.
- Terpen Tijn: One of the few recurring human characters. He is an egotistical painter who uses esoteric language to describe the magic of his art as "subtle vibrations" (Dutch: fijne trillingen), criticizing the rude materialist views of Mr. Bumble, which does not prevent him from accepting his money and meals.
- Amos W. Steinhacker: A frog who is a money obsessed businessman who prefers to be addressed using his initials AWS ("Don’t call me Steinhacker! I’m not a poor schmuck!")
- Steenbreek: A dog who serves as Steinhacker's secretary.
- Garmt Grootgrut: A sheep who serves as the local grocer. Whenever something happens to his shop he complains how "hardworking shopkeepers are always the victim." His name became an eponym in the Dutch language: "grootgrutter", used for big store owners.
- Drs. Okke Zielknijper: A llama who works as a psychiatrist, patronizing his patients using social worker gibberish ("I often saw this in my practice") or having them locked up in a padded cell by his gorilla assistant.
- O. Fanth Mzn: An elephant who serves as publisher and chief editor of the local newspaper.
- Argus: A sensation seeking rat who works as a journalist for O. Fanth Mzn. He is a cousin of Alexander Pieps.
- Kwetal: A gnome. His Dutch name can be read als "'k Weet al" (= "I know everything") - but he is a very modest person. In the adventures, it becomes clear that he really knows a lot, but he uses terms and expressions that are not used in the scientific world, and part of his knowledge is about ancient forces and mysteries. He admires modern inventions, but sometimes does not clearly understand why they are useful.
- Pee Pastinakel: Another gnome. He is the gardener of the woods. He is equipped with some form of synaesthesia, as in observing: "This smells red!" in a dangerous situation.
- Hocus P. Pas: An evil wizard who is one of the few human characters in the series. He is accompanied by (and can transform himself into) a crow-like bird. He curses his opponents using names of ancient demons: "By Zazel and Iod! Serpents on your path!" He is always on the search for extension of his life by extracting life energy from his victims, using black magic.
- Pastuiven Verkwil: A rat who works as a button salesman. He often tries to start a fight for matters he presumes to be injustice, including his own small height.
- Joris Goedbloed: A sly fox who is a con-artist. He is also a recurring character in Toonder's other series Panda.
- Zedekia Zwederkoorn: A rat who is a lawyer or rather a bibacious pettifogger.
- Zwarte Zwadderneel: a preacher obsessed with sin and atonement.

== Film adaptation ==
In 1983 an animated film based on the comics was released: The Dragon That Wasn't (Or Was He?).

== Radio adaptation ==
From 2007 to 2010 Tom Poes was adapted into a series of audio plays broadcast on the Dutch radio channels NPO Radio 6, NPO Radio 6 and NPO Radio 1.

== Monument ==
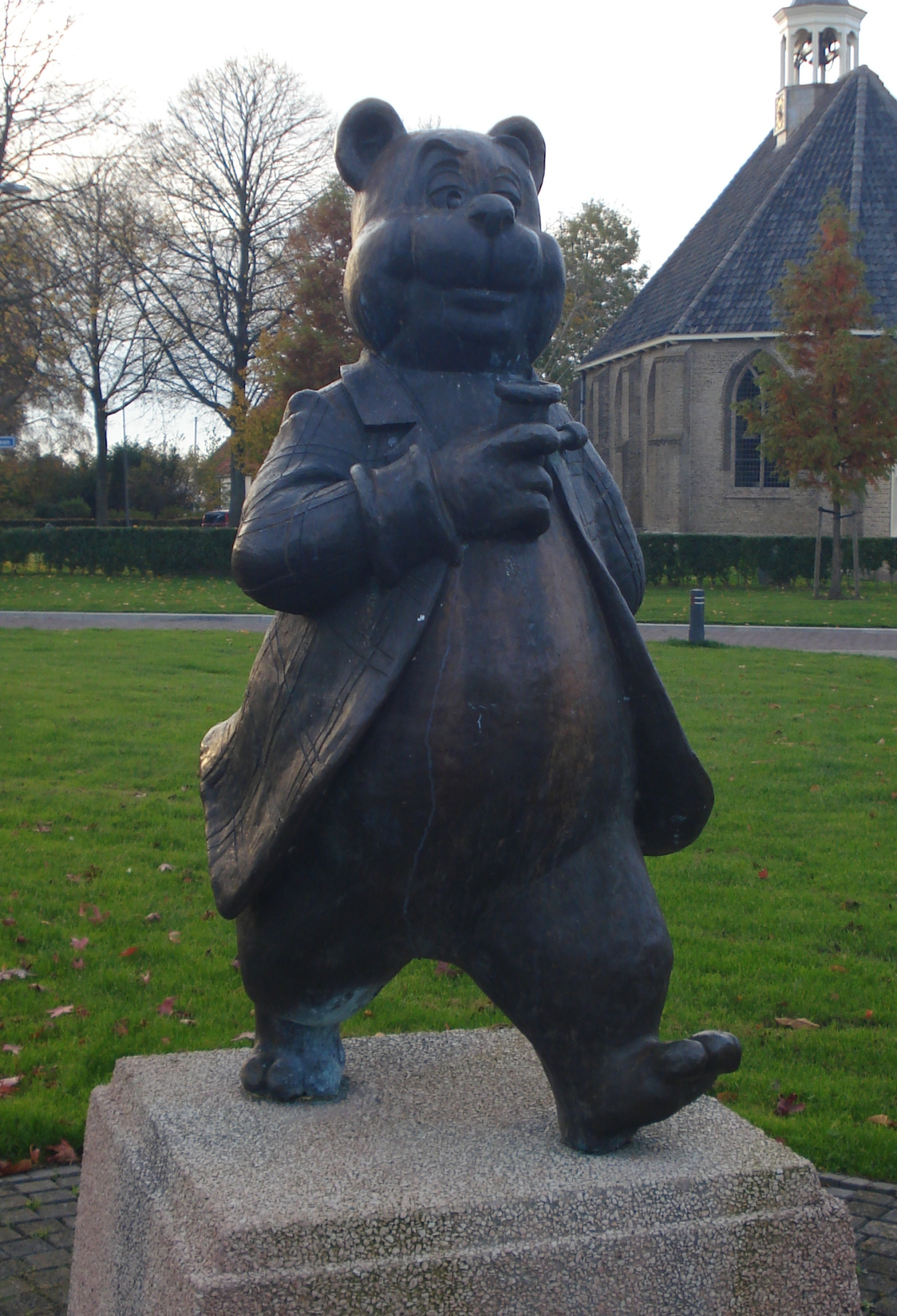
Olivier B. Bommel statue

On July 12, 2002, a six-meter public monument was built in Rotterdam, honoring several characters from the franchise. It was designed by D.J. Chantelle, Pepijn van den Nieuwendijk, Hans van Bentem and Luuk Bode.
