= Phiny Dick =

Dutch illustrator and writer (1912-1990)

Afine Kornélie Dik, better known as Phiny Dick (14 September 1912 – 7 August 1990) was a Dutch illustrator and writer of children's books and comics. She was the wife of Marten Toonder from 1935 until her death.

== Biography ==
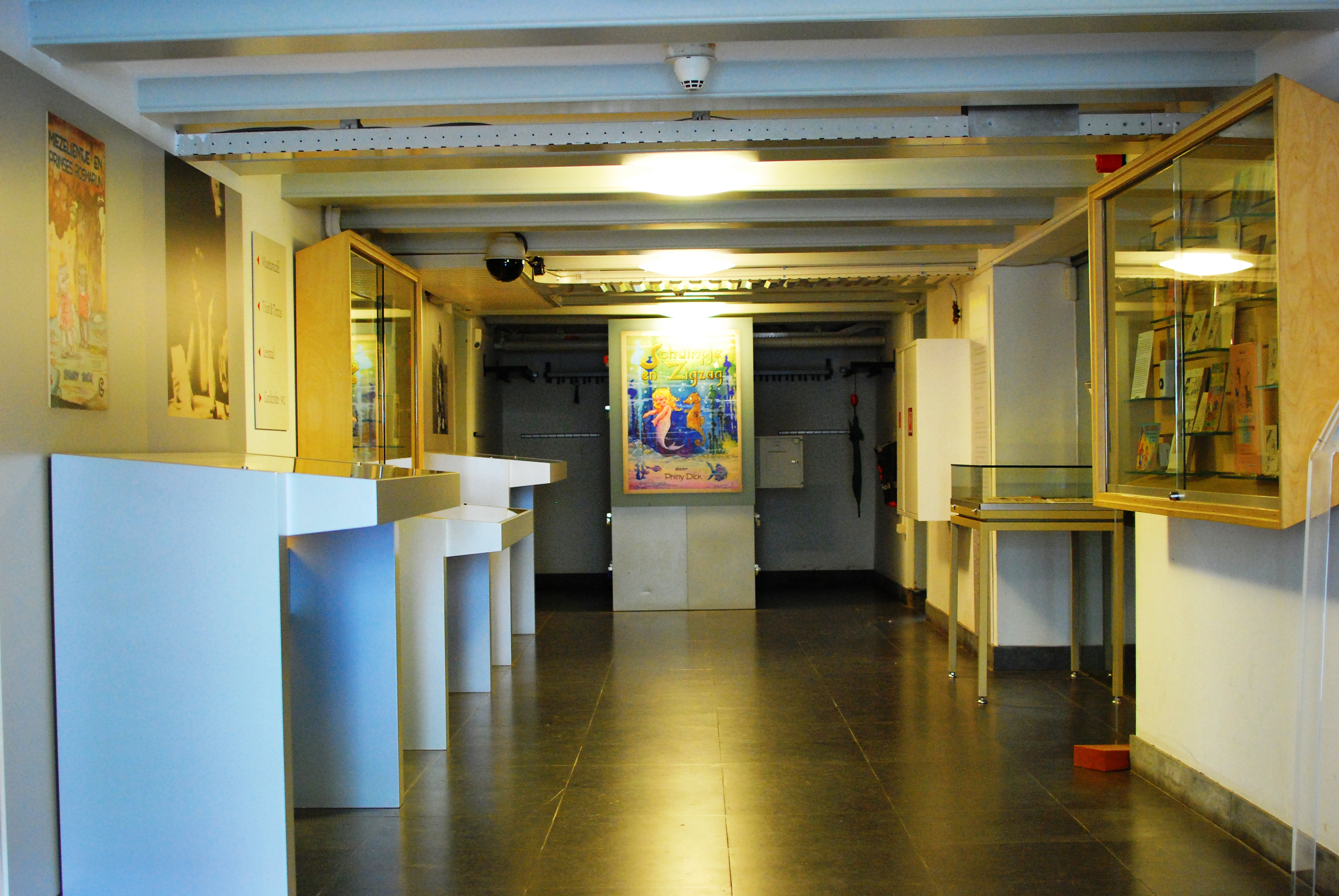
Exhibition room in the basement of Museum Meermanno (Special exhibition May to September 2012)

Afine Dik was born in 1912 in Rotterdam as the only child of Kornelis Dik, a ship's captain, and Afina Hazewinkel.

She completed her studies as an apothecary assistant and worked at a hospital as a nurse-in-training, but when she fell seriously ill with an infected heart muscle, she had to abandon her studies.

In 1935, Dik married Marten Toonder, her neighbour, who shared her love of drawing. Dik had followed a correspondence course in drawing from the Press Art School by the British artist Percy Bradshaw. She then started inking the comic strips written and drawn by Toonder. Marten Toonder worked at the Nederlandsche Rotogravure Maatschappij in Leiden, and they moved there.

To provide an additional income for the family (in 1936 their first child, Eiso, was born), Dik produced her own illustrations and paintings. She changed her pen name to Phiny Dick at the suggestion of publisher Van Goor. Between 1934 and 1938, Dick and Marten Toonder together with his brother, the writer Jan Gerhard Toonder, created the newspaper comic strip Thijs Ijs for "Het Nieuwsblad van het Noorden" and other newspapers. In 1939, she published Miezelientje en Prinses Roozemarijn, a children's book about a white anthropomorfous cat she wrote and illustrated completely. It was published in English in 1941 as Meowina and Princess Rose-Marie

After the outbreak of World War II, Dick and Toonder started working for De Telegraaf and moved to Amsterdam. For that newspaper, Toonder and Dick created a new comic strip, Tom Puss, about a small white cat. Dick invented the name and wrote the first two stories. The series became one of the classic Dutch comics.

In 1944 their second son, Onno, was born. The birth was a difficult one and nearly killed Phiny. When she had sufficiently recovered, Dick created a new book, Schuimpje en Zigzag: it was rejected by the publisher because it contained a mermaid with bare breasts, but as Dick refused to change the illustrations, the book was never published.

In 1941 and 1948 she created two sequels to "Miezelientje". Her main work in the post-war period was the newspaper comic strip Olle Kapoen, which she wrote and illustrated. It appeared not only in Dutch but also in German and Swedish, and ran from 1945 until 1954. It was followed by Birre Beer between 1954 and 1959. She also provided illustrations for "De dag na Bethlehem" by her brother-in-law Jan Gerhard Toonder, and started painting portraits and making tapestries.

Marten and Phiny adopted two Indonesian girls in 1956–1957, and in 1962 they moved to Greystones, in Ireland. Phiny Dick devoted her time to painting. She died in Greystones in 1990.

== Bibliography ==
=== Comics ===
- 1934-1935: De stoute streken van Stip en Stap, in "Extra Magazine"
- 1934-1938: Thijs Ijs
- 1935: Doris en Daantje, in "Extra Magazine"
- 1939: Miezelientje, in "Onze Club-Krant"
- 1941: Tom Puss (Tom Poes in Dutch): text for the first episodes, illustrated by Marten Toonder
- 1945-1954: Olle Kapoen in "Het Amsterdams Dagblad" and other newspapers: illustrated originally by Dick, she wrote all later stories as well, to illustrations by Coen van Hunnik and Richard Klokkers: the text comic reappeared as ballon comics in 1958–1959 in "Donald Duck". The original comic series was also published in Belgium, France, Norway and Sweden
- 1954-1959: Birre Beer, in "Het Algemeen Handelsblad": only the first episodes are written by Dick, with artwork by Ton Beek: the series was then continued by her eldest son Eiso.
- 1970s: covers for reeditions of Tom Puss comics

=== Books ===
- 1939: Miezelientje en Prinses Roosmarijn (8th impression in 1975); translated in English in 1941
- 1940: Olli Fant uit Poppelo (2nd impression in 1953)
- 1940: Pijper, het Bosmannetje
- 1940: Pinkje's bezoek bij de Eekhoorntjes and Pinkje gaat uit op avontuur, text by Lieske Havelaar
- 1940: Vader Dirk en Moeder Dina, text by M. C. Van Oven
- 1941: Miezelientje en Kakeline de Kip (5th imprssion in 1975)
- 1941: Suizebol en Bijdepink
- 1941: Pom, Verk en Fop (the origin of the later Olle Kapoen comic strips)
- 1941: De dag na Bethlehem, written by Jan Gerhard Toonder
- 1941: Versjes uit de oude doos: also published in 5 separate parts, listed below
  - 1941: Aftel- en balspelletjes
  - 1941: Allerlei van vroeger (reprinted 2 times)
  - 1941: Kringspelletjes (reprinted)
  - 1941: Rijmpjes voor allen (reprinted)
  - 1941: Touwtje springen
  - 1941: Sinterklaas, Kerstmis en Nieuwjaar
- 1942: Oude rijmpjes, text by Loek Van de Blankevoort
- 1943: Pom van de Pomheuvel
- 1945: Schuimpje en Zigzag, unpublished until 2012
- 1945: Van Klaas Vaak en zijn brave zandkaboutertjes, text by Dola de Jong
- 1946: Tierelantijn en Tureluur and Tierelantijn en Tureluur gaan uit op avontuur, text by Thea Mol
- 1948: Miezelientje en Wol de Beer (5th impression in 1975)
