= Scribbly =

Dutch comic strip

Scribbly was a Dutch comic strip, created by Jean-Paul Arends. It ran daily in the Dutch edition of the Metro free newspaper from 1999 to 2010. Seven albums have been published containing the daily strips. The comic is known for its weird cast, and its tendency for parodying well-known films, books and famous people.

== Cast ==
- Scribbly is the eponymous protagonist. He is a schizophrenic and lives in an institute for people who are mentally disturbed.
- Psychotron is Scribbly's super-hero alter ego, in a few strips where he deludedly wears a red cape, which allows him to think he can fly.
- Frits is Scribbly's voice-inside-his-head.
- Quibus is an animated sheet of paper who is usually Scribbly's friend.
- Doctor Psilo leads the House for the Mentally Disturbed.
- Zark is an extraterrestrial alien who looks like a giant pickle with an antenna. He can use the antenna for radio reception, remote control, as well as hearing Frits. He hails from planet Zortian II.
- Kraz is Zark's brother. He lives on the same planet where Zark used to live.
- Waverider is Zark's super-hero alter ego, who has no known powers.
- Doe-ran is a haunting spirit, in the shape of a floating mask, that was initially summoned by Quibus to torment Scribbly. He is a powerful magician.
- Draakje is a little dragon that doesn't talk and has a tendency of breathing fire at inconvenient moments. He barks just like a dog.
- Olav is a huge man who is a porter at the House. He shouts a lot.
- V-252 is a friendly robot from outer space with a television on his belly. He is married to another robot, and they have a toaster for a child.
- H-Nibal is a huge killer robot from outer space, who was eventually defeated by D-2120.
- Mildred is a nurse at the House, who keeps an eye on the patients using Meneer Pollepel.
- Pollepel is a ladle with a drawn-on angry face. When used, he scares the patients.
- Eddy is one of the newer patients in the House, and is a naughty baby duck. He likes wine, and drives around the house in a pink toy Cadillac.
- Geestenclub are four ghosts who incidentally appear in the comics.
- Flumpy is a huge bee, who is the mascot of the brand of cereal eaten in the House.
- Giovanni is a shrimp, who is sometimes being drawn by Zark in an attempt to create a comic book. Giovanni lives in Garnaalsmeer.
- Zen is a robot who thinks for himself, created by V-252.

== Albums ==
1. "Ik hoop dat die ene goeie erin staat" (I hope that good one is in here)
2. "Ik snap ze nooit" (I never get them)
3. "Doe maar iets creatiefs" (Make it something creative)
4. "Daar moet je een stripje over maken" (You should make a comic about that)
5. "De verzonken stad van Zahn-Luac" (The lost city of Zahn-Luac)
6. "Een opsteker van jewelste" (A big stroke of luck)
7. "Meer wafels, minder misdaad" (More waffles, less crime)
8. "Het is maar een droom, jongen" (It's just a dream, son)
9. "Absurdor"
