= Eric Schreurs =

Dutch cartoonist (1958–2020)

Eric Schreurs (15 September 1958, Leiden – 29 May 2020, Leiden) was a Dutch comics artist. He was the winner of the 2002 Stripschapprijs. He is most famous for his long-running humor comics series Joop Klepzeiker, in magazine Nieuwe Revu, which had satirical elements. Later in his career he was also active as a painter.

In his comics series "Joop Klepzeiker" Eric Schreurs depicts a Hogarthesque view on Dutch cities like Amsterdam and mocks the Dutch permissive society of the eighties and nineties: in Schreurs view, the streets and canals of Amsterdam are lined with dirt, dog poo, greasy bars and sex shops. If the main character Joop Klepzeiker, a permanent loser, goes for an outing in the park (where most dogs, humans and animals are seen practicing free love), bums and drunks will frequently try to scam him. If the Klepzeiker character gets an outing to the beach he often suffers rejection by topless bathing beauties or he will land on the nude beach by no fault of his own, trying to get out of an embarrassing situation. In a comic about a police cop (album 2) Schreurs signs the comic as "Erich von Sckreurch", creating a subtle reference from depicted authority figure to authority figures during the German occupation of the Netherlands, thus adding another layer to the comic. Schreurs also plays with his signature in other episodes, signing as E. Sururs, Eric Scrurz, Eric Schrrrs, Sreurrs, Eruk Scrurz, Sreursch (Album 2, Joop Klepzeiker).

His son Boris is a drag queen known as My Little Puny. My Little Puny competed on season two of Drag Race Holland, placing as the runner-up of the season.
