= Marten Toonder =

Dutch comics artist (1912–2005)

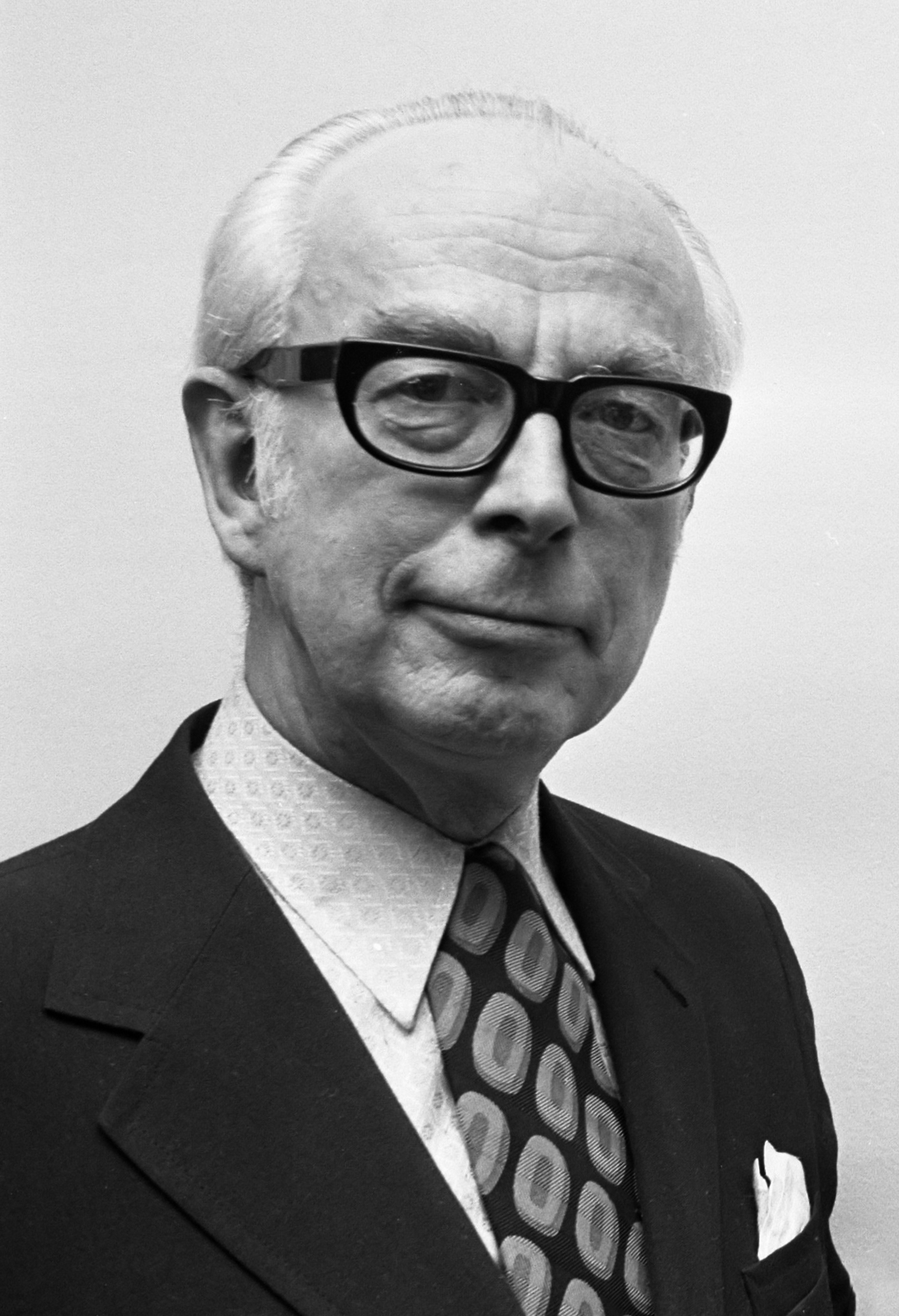
- Toonder in 1972
- Born: 2 May 1912; Rotterdam, Netherlands
- Died: 27 July 2005 (aged 93); Laren, North Holland, Netherlands
- Occupation: Writer
- Spouse: Phiny Dick
- Writing career
- Genre: Graphic novels

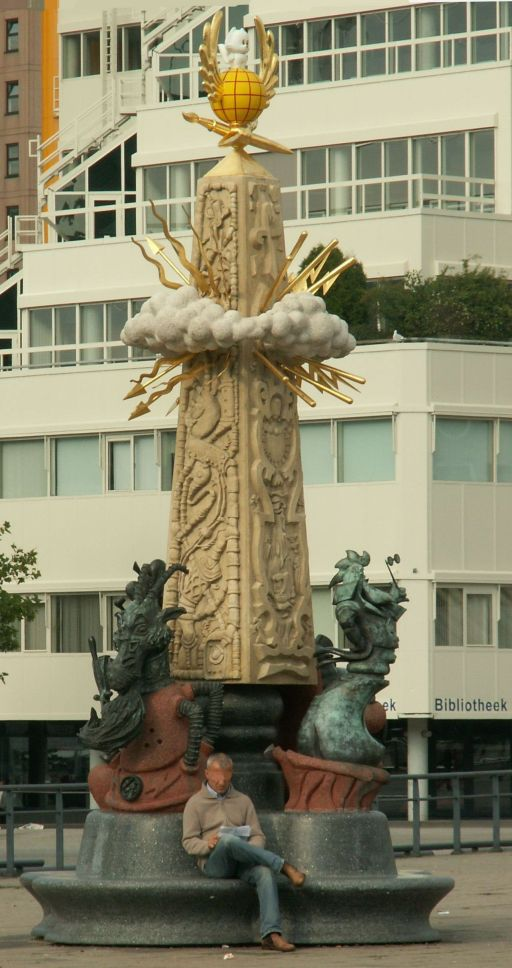
Monument Ode aan Marten Toonder in honor of his 90th birthday in 2002 in Rotterdam

Marten Toonder (2 May 1912 – 27 July 2005) was a Dutch comic strip creator. He was probably the most successful comic artist in the Netherlands and had a great influence on the Dutch language by introducing new words and expressions. He is most famous for his series Tom Puss and Panda.

== Life ==
Toonder was born in Rotterdam on 2 May 1912, in Rotterdam. He lived in Ireland from 1965 until the early 1990s. He was married to the cartoon artist Phiny Dick (1912–1990), who collaborated with her husband and on whose earlier created characters Ollie B Bumble and Tom Puss were based. In 1996, at the age of 84, he married the composer Tera de Marez Oyens, who died the same year. Together with his brother, author Jan Gerhard Toonder, he assisted his father, (Captain) Marten Toonder Sr., a seaman born in the Dutch northern province Groningen, to write a book about his life, in which Toonder Sr. describes many details about the closing era of professional cargo sailing, the Rotterdam Lloyd (Line to East Indies), the Holland America Line, and about pre-war Rotterdam.

Marten Toonder died in his sleep on 27 July 2005, aged 93, in Laren, North Holland.

== Tom Puss/Oliver B. Bumble series ==
In 1931, after his final exams, Marten Toonder went to Buenos Aires with his father. Here he got acquainted with the work of the well-known Argentine artist and editor Dante Quinterno, who ran a studio producing comics. Quinterno's creations impressed him to such a degree that he decided to become an artist himself. His most famous comic series were the Tom Puss (Tom Poes in Dutch) and Oliver B. Bumble (Olivier B. Bommel in Dutch) series that appeared in a Dutch newspaper from 1941–86. It has a very characteristic format. Every day there were three drawings and an accompanying text (about a book-page long). It started out as a children's cartoon, but gradually became more relevant to adults. Nowadays his texts are considered literature by some critics, and Toonder received several literary prizes for them. He invented many new words and expressions and some of those are now widely used in the Dutch language. Many personalities in his comics have their own peculiar dialect of Dutch, for instance Prlwytzkofsky language of professor Prlwytzkofsky, an innovative mixture of Dutch and German. Due to this emphasis on language play, Toonder's work is difficult to translate. His drawing style is very detailed and might be compared to Pogo, with more room for background drawings, since there are no text balloons in the drawings. Apart from his eccentric use of language Toonder is also praised for his satirical approach, with stories that led to him being compared with a fabulist.

== Bibliography ==
=== Tom Puss/Oliver B. Bumble series ===
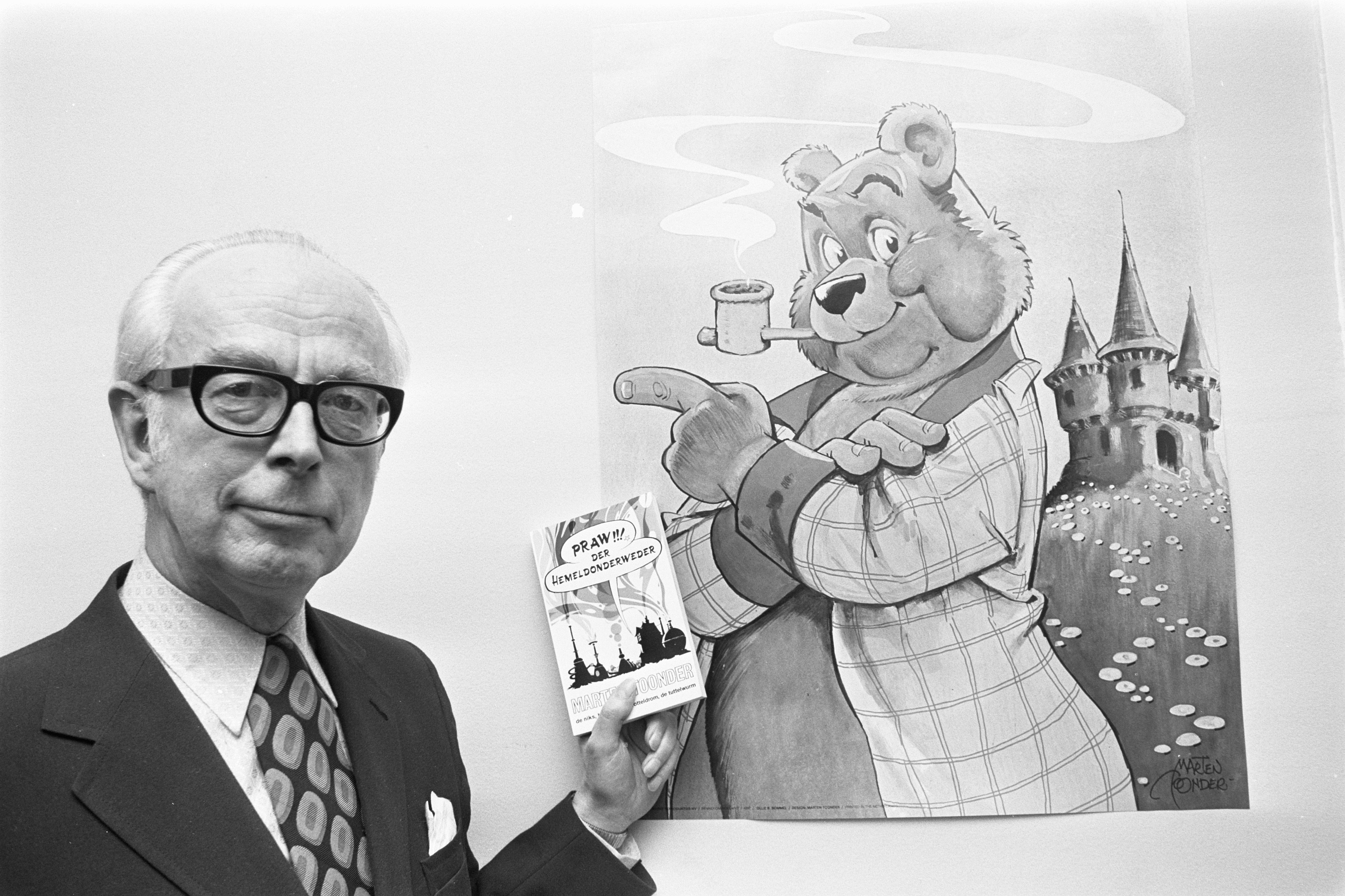
Marten Toonder with Oliver B. Bumble

1941 :

- Tom Poes ontdekt het geheim der blauwe aarde, story, (Tom Puss discovers the secret of the blue earth)
- De Toverpijp (The Magical Pipe)
- Tom Poes in den toovertuin, story (Tom Puss in the magic garden)
- De geheimzinnige roverhoofdman, story (The mysterious robber boss)
- De Drakenburcht, story (The Dragon Court)
- Het verdwijneiland, story (The Disappear Island)
- De Reuzenvogel, story (The Giant Bird)

1942 :

- De rare uitvinding, story (The odd invention)
- Het eiland van Grim, Gram en Grom, story (The island of Grimm, Gramm and Gromm)
- De zieke hertog, story (The sick duke)
- Het monster-ei, story (The monster egg)
- Kasper en de draak, story (Kasper and the dragon)
- Tom Poes en de laatste markies van Carabas, story (Tom Puss and the last count of Carabas)
- Tom Poes in het land van de blikken mannen, story (Tom Puss and the land of the tin men) (verhalen)
- Tom Poes en de betoverde spiegel, story (Tom Puss and the enchanted mirror)

1943 :

- Heer Bommel en de bergmensen, story (Sir Bumble and the mountain people)
- Tom Poes en het geheim van het Noorderlicht, story (Tom Puss and the secret of the Northern Light)
- Tom Poes en de Bommelschat, story (Tom Puss and the Bumble treasure)
- Tom Poes en de schat op de zeebodem, story (Tom Puss and the treasure at the bottom of the sea)
- Tom Poes ontmoet een oude bekende, story (Tom Puss meets an old acquaintance)

1944 :

- Tom Poes en De Superfilm-onderneming, story (Tom Puss and The Super Film endeavour)
- Tom Poes en de meester-schilder, story (Tom Puss and the master painter)
- Tom Poes en de Chinese waaier, story (Tom Puss and the Chinese fan)

1947 :

- De wonderdokter, story (The medical genius)
- De watergeest, story (The water spirit)
- Tom Poes en de talisman, story (Tom Puss and the talisman)
- Tom Poes en de nieuwe ijstijd, story (Tom Puss and the new ice age)
- Het monster van Loch-Ness, story (The Loch Ness monster)

1948 :

- De geheimzinnige sleutel, story (The mysterious key)
- De grootgroeiers, story (The great growers)
- De zeeslang, story (The sea snake)
- Heer Bommel stuit de vooruitgang, story (Sir Bumble prevents progress)
- Tom Poes en de Pierrace, story (Tom Puss and the Pier race)

1949 :

- Het vibreerputje, story (The vibrating well)
- Horror de Ademloze, story (Horror the Breathless)
- Solvertje, story (Little Solver)
- De betoverde prinses, story (The enchanted princess)
- Kwetal de breinbaas, story (Kwetal the brain boss)

1950 :

- Het Lijm-Teem
- De volvetters, story (The full fatties)
- Het wegwerk, story (The road work)
- Eh… dinges, story (Eh… whatever)

1951 :

- De Partij van de Blijheid, story (The Party of the Happiness)
- Tom Poes en Mom Bakkesz, story (Tom Puss and Mumm Bakkesz)
- De kneep van Knipmes, story (The knip of the Snip knife)
- De geheimzinnige gaper, story (The secretive gawker)

1952 :

- Tom Poes en de partenspeler, story (Tom Puss and the party player)
- Het wroegwezen, story (The Remorser)
- De Schoonschijners, story (The Nice Lookers)
- Tom Poes en de gebroeders Weeromstuit, story (Tom Puss and brothers Turn about)
- Heer Bommel's Fotoboek, beginners' guidelines to photography, with interesting in-photo comic work (Sir Bumble's Photo Book)

1953 :

- Tom Poes en de wenswerkster, story (Tom Puss and the wish worker)

1954 :

- Tom Poes en het tijddeurtje, story (Tom Puss and the little time door)

1955 :

- Tom Poes en het slaagsysteem, story (Tom Puss and the success system)
- Tom Poes en de knip-hoed, story (Tom Puss and the trim hat)

1959 :

- De feunix, story (The fakenix)
- Tom Poes en de Boemel naar Doezel, story (Tom Puss and the slow train to Napping)

1962 :

- Tom Poes en het huilen van Urgje, story (Tom Puss and the howling of little Urg)

1963 :

- Tom Poes en de wilde wagen, story (Tom Puss and the wild wagon)
- De bovenbazen, story (The superbosses)
- Tom Poes en de Zonnebril, story (Tom Puss and the sunglasses)

1964 :

- Tom Poes en de Waggelgedachten, story (Tom Puss and Waggel's ideas)
- Tom Poes en de H-H-Handschoenen, story (Tom Puss and the g-g-gloves)

1965 :

- Tom Poes en de wisselschat, story (Tom Puss and the switcher treasure)

1966 :

- Tom Poes en de Weerbrouwers, story (Tom Puss and the weather brewers)
- Tom Poes en de Trouwe Vierwielers, story (Tom Puss and the faithful four-wheelers)

1967 :

- Als je begrijpt wat ik bedoel…, several stories (If you know what I mean…)
- En daar houd ik mij aan…, several stories (And I stick to that…)

1968 :

- Geld speelt geen rol, several stories (Money is not relevant)

1969 :

- Een Heer moet alles alleen doen, several stories (A Gentleman should do everything alone)

1970 :

- Zoals mijn goede vader zei, several stories (Like my good father used to say)
- Een eenvoudige doch voedzame maaltijd, several stories (A simple yet nutritious meal)

1971 :

- 'k Wist niet dat ik het in mij had, several stories (… Didn't know I had it in me)
- Parbleu, several stories

1972 :

- Praw! Der Hemeldonderweder, several stories (Praw! Of the Heavens-thunder-weather)
- Een groot denkraam, several stories (A large thought frame)

1973 :

- Met uw welnemen, several stories (With your permission)
- Verzin toch eens een list!, several stories (Quickly, come up with a ruse!)
- Altijd dezelfde, several stories (Always the same)

1974 :

- Overgehaalde landrotten, several stories (Winched up land lubbers)
- Zeg nu zelf…, several stories (Let's face it…)
- Met mijn teer gestel, several stories (My tender constitution)

1975 :

- Wat enigjes, several stories (How adorable)
- En daar houd ik mij aan, several stories (And I stick to that)

1976 :

- Grofstoffelijke trillingen, several stories (Base material vibrations)
- Mijn eigen eenzame weg, several stories (My own lonely road)

1977 :

- Zaken zijn zaken, several stories (Business is business)
- Hoe vreselijk is dit alles, several stories (This is all so horrible)
- De Grote Onthaler, story (The Great Welcomer)

1978 :

- Hm, several stories
- Als u mij wilt verschonen, several stories (If you'll pardon me)

1979 :

- Ach mallerd, several stories (Oh silly you)
- Héél stilletjes, several stories (Very quietly)
- De andere wereld, story (The other world)

1980 :

- Had ik maar beter geluisterd, several stories (If only I had listened more carefully)
- Daar zit iets achter, several stories (There's something behind that)

1981 :

- Een ragfijn spel, several stories (A subtle game)
- Hier ligt een mooie taak, several stories (Here's a nice little job)

1982 :

- Ook dat nog, several stories (That, too)
- Een enkel opbeurend woord, several stories (A single encouraging word)

1983 :

- Dit gaat te ver, several stories (This goes too far)

1984 :

- Mooi is dat, several stories (That's just beautiful)
- Het uiterste gevraagd, several stories (The ultimate commitment is required)

1985 :

- Daar kan ik niet tegen, several stories (I can't stand that)
- Soms verstout ik mij, several stories (Sometimes I embolden myself)

1986 :

- Een kleine handreiking, several stories (A little helping hand)
- Dat geeft te denken, several stories (That leads to thinking)
- Een Bommelding, (A Bumble-thing - in usual pronunciation bom-melding means bomb-alarm)
- Heer Bommel en ik (Sir Bumble and I)

1987 :

- Hanezang, poëmen van Querelijn Xaverius, Markies de Canteclaer van Barneveldt, bijeengelezen door M. Toonder,

(Cock-song), poems by Querelijn Xaverius, Marquis of Barneveldt, compiled by M. Toonder"

- Wat ben je toch knap, several stories (You're so sharp)
- Dát zag ik nu eens net!, several stories (I just saw that!)

1988 :

- Ik voel dat heel fijn aan, several stories (I'm very sensitive to that)
- Als dat maar goed gaat, several stories (If that just ends well)

1989 :

- Vleugeljaren, poëmen van Querelijn Xaverius, Markies de Canteclaer van Barneveldt, bijeengelezen door M. Toonder,

(Winged years), poems by Querelijn Xaverius, Marquis of Barneveldt, compiled by M. Toonder

1990 :

- Heer Bommel komt op, several stories (Sir Bumble arises)
- Heer Bommel vervolgt, several stories (Sir Bumble continues)

=== Autobiographical material ===
- Vroeger was de aarde plat (1992). Amsterdam: De Bezige Bij. ISBN 90-234-3258-4.
- Het geluid van bloemen (1993). Amsterdam: De Bezige Bij. ISBN 90-234-3330-0.
- Onder het kollende meer Doo (1996). Amsterdam: De Bezige Bij. ISBN 90-234-3562-1.
- Tera (1998). Amsterdam: De Bezige Bij. ISBN 90-234-3825-6.
- We zullen wel zien (2001). Amsterdam: De Bezige Bij. ISBN 90-234-6241-6.

=== Biography ===
- Wim Hazeu: Marten Toonder Biografie (2012). Amsterdam: De Bezige Bij. ISBN 978-90-234-7318-3.

== Awards ==
- 1982: Stripschapprijs, Netherlands
- 1992: Tollensprijs, Netherlands
- 1997: Adamson Gold Award for Lifetime Achievement, Sweden
