= List of comic books =

This is a list of comic books, by country.

== Argentina (historieta) ==
- Alack Sinner by Carlos Sampayo (author) and José Antonio Muñoz (artist)
- Bárbara by Ricardo Barreiro (author) and Juan Zanotto (artist)
- El Eternauta by Héctor Germán Oesterheld (author) and Solano López (artist)
- Ernie Pike by Héctor Germán Oesterheld (author) and Hugo Pratt (artist)
- Lúpin by Guillermo Guerrero and Héctor Mario Sidoli
- Mafalda by Quino
- Nippur de Lagash by Robin Wood (author) and various artists.
- Mort Cinder by Héctor Germán Oesterheld (author) and Alberto Breccia (artist)
- Patoruzu by Dante Quinterno
- El Cazador de Aventuras by Jorge Lucas
- El Caballero Rojo by Tony Torres and Mariano Navarro
- Animal Urbano by Edu Molina
- La historia de la señora de la dominación by Andressa DePrims
- Mikilo by Rafael Curci

== Australia ==
- Brainmaster
- Captain Atom
- Cyberswine
- Cyclone!
- Dark Nebula
- Dee Vee (1997)
- The Example (2005)
- Fire Fang (1982)
- Ginger Meggs Annual
- Hairbutt the Hippo (1989)
- Ink Spots
- The Kookaburra
- The Mask
- Niteside and the Rock
- The Panther
- Phantastique
- Pizza Man
- Platinum Grit (1993)
- The Raven
- Reverie
- The Scorpion
- Vampire!
- Vixen (1977)
- Zero Assassin
- Homeless Loose (2013)
- 2015(2015) BY A.Chan

== Austria ==
- ASH - Austrian Superheroes by Harald Havas

== Belgium (stripverhaal, strip; bande dessinée, BD) ==
- Agent 212 by Raoul Cauvin (author) and Daniël Kox (artist)
- Alpha by Youri Jigounov (artist) & P. Renard (author), later by Mythic (author)
- Apocalypse Mania by Philippe Aymond (artist) and Laurent-Frédéric Bollée (author)
- Bakelandt by Hector Leemans.
- Barelli by Bob de Moor.
- Benoit Brisefer by Peyo.
- Bernard Prince by Greg (author) and Hermann (artist)
- Bert by Kamagurka.
- Bessy by Willy Vandersteen.
- Biebel by Marc Legendre.
- Blagues Coquines by Dany, and others.
- Blake and Mortimer by Edgar Pierre Jacobs
- Bob Morane by Dino Attanasio, William Vance, Pierre Joubert, Henri Lievens, Claude Pascal, René Follet. Based on the novels by Henri Vernes.
- Bobo by Paul Deliège
- Boule et Bill by Jean Roba
- Bruno Brazil by William Vance and Louis Albert (Greg)
- Buck Danny by Jean-Michel Charlier and Victor Hubinon
- Chlorophylle, by Raymond Macherot, Dupa,...
- Les Cités Obscures by Benoit Peeters (author) and François Schuiten (artist)
- Colonel Clifton, by Raymond Macherot, later by Jo-El Azara, then by Turk & De Groot, then by Bédu, and currently by Rodrigue
- Comanche by Greg (author) and Hermann (artist)
- Cori, de Scheepsjongen by Bob de Moor.
- Cowboy Henk by Kamagurka (author) and Herr Seele (artist).
- Cubitus by Dupa.
- Cupidon by Raoul Cauvin (text) and Malik (drawings).
- Dallas Barr by Haldeman (author) and Marvano (artist)
- Djinn by Jean Dufaux (author) & Ana Mirallès (artist)
- Double Masque by Jean Dufaux (author) & Jamar (artist)
- L'Eleve Ducobu by Zidrou (author) and Godi (artist).
- Les Eternels by Yann (author) & Felix Meynet (artist)
- Gaston Lagaffe by André Franquin
- De Geuzen by Willy Vandersteen
- Giacomo C. by Jean Dufaux (author) & Griffo (artist)
- Gil Jourdan by Maurice Tillieux (author and artist) & Gos (artist)
- India Dreams by Maryse Charles (author) & Jean-François Charles (artist)
- Les Innommables by Yann (author) and Didier Conrad.
- Insiders by Bartoll & Garreta.
- Inspector Canardo by Benoit Sokal.
- I.R.$. by Bernard Vrancken (artist) & Stephen Desberg (author)
- Isabelle by Will, André Franquin, Raymond Macherot (author) and Yvan Delporte (artist).
- Jeremiah by Hermann (artist)/
- Jerry Spring by Jijé.
- The Adventures of Jo, Zette and Jocko by Hergé
- Johan and Peewit by Peyo
- Jommeke by Jef Nys
- Jugurtha by Jean-Luc Vernal (author) and Hermann (artist)
- Kabouter Wesley by Jonas Geirnaert.
- Kid Paddle by Midam.
- De Kiekeboes by Merho.
- Kramikske by Jean-Pol.
- Largo Winch by Philippe Francq (artist) & Jean van Hamme (author)
- Léonard by Turk & De Groot
- Luc Orient by Greg (author) and Eddy Paape (artist).
- Lucky Luke by Morris
- De Lustige Kapoentjes by Marc Sleen.
- Les Maîtres de l'Orge by Francis Vallès (artist) & Jean van Hamme (author)
- Marsupilami by André Franquin
- Mélusine by Clarke (artist) & Gilson (author)
- Modeste et Pompon by André Franquin
- Murena by Jean Dufaux (author) & Philippe Delaby (artist)
- Natacha by François Walthéry
- Nero by Marc Sleen
- Niklos Koda by Jean Dufaux (author) & Olivier Grenson (artist).
- La Patrouille des Castors by Jean-Michel Charlier (author) and MiTacq (artist).
- Le Petit Spirou by Tome & Janry.
- Pierre Tombal by Raoul Cauvin (author) and Marc Hardy (artist)
- Piet Fluwijn en Bolleke by Marc Sleen.
- Piet Pienter en Bert Bibber by Pom.
- Poussy by Peyo.
- Quick & Flupke (Quick et Flupke) by Hergé
- Le Rayon U (The U Ray) by Edgar Pierre Jacobs
- Redbeard by Victor Hubinon
- La Ribambelle by Jean Roba.
- De Rode Ridder (Red Knight) by Willy Vandersteen.
- Sam by Marc Legendre (author) and Jan Bosschaert (artist).
- Sammy by Berck and Jean-Pol.
- Le Scorpion by Enrico Marini (artist) & Stephen Desberg (author)
- Le Scrameustache by Gos (artist) & Walt (author)
- Sibylline by Raymond Macherot
- The Smurfs (Les Schtroumpfs) by Peyo
- Soda by Philippe Tome (author), Luc Warnant (artist) and Bruno Gazzotti (artist).
- Suske en Wiske (also called Spike and Suzy, Bob & Bobette or Willy and Wanda) by Willy Vandersteen
- Spirou et Fantasio by (in chronological order) Rob-Vel, Jijé, André Franquin, Jean-Claude Fournier, Raoul Cauvin (author) and Nic Broca (artist), Yves Chaland, Tome and Janry, and Morvan (author) and Munuera (artist) (currently)
- Thorgal by Jean van Hamme (author) and Grzegorz Rosinski (artist)
- The Adventures of Tintin by Hergé
- Les Tours de Bois-Maury by Hermann
- Les Tuniques Bleues by Raoul Cauvin (author) and Lambil (artist)
- Urbanus by Urbanus (author) and Willy Linthout (artist).
- La vengeance du comte Skarbek by Grzegorz Rosinski (artist) & Yves Sente (author)
- Le Vieux Nick et Barbe-Noire by Marcel Remacle
- XIII by Jean van Hamme (author) and William Vance (artist)
- Yoko Tsuno by Roger Leloup
- Zig et Puce by Greg, creation by Alain Saint-Ogan
- Zilverpijl by Frank Sels, Edgard Gastmans, Karel Verschuere.

== Bolivia ==
- Super Cholita

== Brazil (gibi, história em quadrinhos) ==
- 10 Pãezinhos by Fábio Moon & Gabriel Bá
- Capitão Brasil
- Jimmy Five (Cebolinha) by Maurício de Sousa
- Chiclete com Banana by Arnaldo Angeli Filho
- Piratas do Tietê by Laerte Coutinho
- Geraldão by Glauco Villas Boas
- Níquel Náusea by Fernando Gonsales
- Transubstanciação by Lourenço Mutarelli
- Monica's Gang (Turma da Mônica) by Maurício de Sousa

== Canada ==
- Arbalet by André Pijet
- Captain Canuck
- Cerebus the Aardvark by Dave Sim with Gerhard
- Dirty Plotte
- Drawn & Quarterly
- Les Cantons – Rondel et Baton à la conquête du Saladier d'argent by André Pijet
- Le Tour du Québec en BD
- Lethargic Lad
- Louis Riel
- New Triumph
- Night Life
- Northguard
- Peepshow - Joe Matt.
- Palookaville
- Scott Pilgrim by Bryan Lee O'Malley
- Thieves & Kings by Mark Oakley
- To Be Announced
- The True North
- The True North II
- Endurance by Newryst
- Underwater
- Weapons of Terra Ocean by Kenneth Lu
- Yummy Fur

== Colombia ==
- Mojicón by Adolfo Samper
- Copetin by Ernesto Franco
- Tukano by Jorge Peña
- Calarcá by Carlos Garzón
- Dina by Bernardo Rincón (comics)|
- Zambo Dendé

== Chile ==
- Condorito by René Rios (Pepo)

== Côte d'Ivoire ==
- Magie Noire by Gilbert G. Groud

== Croatia ==
- Mister Mačak

== Denmark ==
- Egoland. Comic series.
- Illustrated History of Denmark. Illustration.
- Jernpotte (Ironpot). Graphic novel.
- Og det var Danmark.
- Rasmus Klump. Comic series.
- Skæve Vinkler (Slanted Lines), comic series.
- Ulvevinter (Wolfwinter), graphic novel.

== Egypt ==
- Samir
- Middle East Heroes
- Tok Tok

== Finland (sarjakuvat) ==
- Aku Ankka, the Finnish translation of Donald Duck
- Kramppeja ja Nyrjähdyksiä
- Lätsä, the Finnish translation of Andy Capp.
- Masi, the Finnish translation of Beetle Bailey.
- Moomin by Tove Jansson and Lars Jansson
- Mämmilä by Tarmo Koivisto
- Praedor by Petri Hiltunen
- Punaniska by Harri "Wallu" Vaalio
- Velho, the Finnish translation of The Wizard of Id.
- Viivi & Wagner by Jussi "Juba" Tuomola

== France (bande dessinée, BD, bédés) ==
- 120 Rue de la Gare and Brouillard au pont de Tolbiac by Léo Malet (author) and Jacques Tardi (artist)
- Adèle Blanc-Sec by Jacques Tardi
- Agatha Christie by François Rivière (author) and Jean-François Miniac (artist)
- Agence Barbare by Marko and Olier
- Anibal Cinq by Alejandro Jodorowsky, Manuel Moro and Georges Bess
- Asterix and Obelix by René Goscinny (author) and Albert Uderzo (artist and author)
- Blueberry by Jean-Michel Charlier (author) and Jean Giraud (artist)
- Blue Space by Richard Marazano and Chris Lamquet
- Castaka written by Alejandro Jodorowsky, artwork by Das Pastoras
- La Caste des Méta-Barons written by Alejandro Jodorowsky, artwork by Juan Gimenez
- César and Jessica
- Le Cycle de Cyann written by François Bourgeon
- Dungeon written by Lewis Trondheim and Joann Sfar, drawn by Lewis Trondheim, Joann Sfar, Christopher Blain, Manu Larcenet, Phillipe Bercovici, Andréas, Blanquet, Boulet
- Fanfoué des Pnottas by Félix Meynet
- Frantico by Frantico
- L'Incal by Alejandro Jodorowsky and Jean Giraud
- Iznogoud by René Goscinny (author) and Jean Tabary (artist and author)
- Juan Solo by Alejandro Jodorowsky and Georges Bess
- Lone Sloane by Philippe Druillet
- The spiffy adventures of McConey (original title: Lapinot) by Lewis Trondheim
- Michel Vaillant by Jean Graton, later by Philippe Graton
- Monsieur Jean by Charles Dupuy and Philippe Berberian
- Oumpah-pah by René Goscinny (author) and Albert Uderzo (artist)
- Pyrénée by Régis Loisel (author) and Philippe Sternis (artist)
- Rahan by Roger Lécureux (author) and André Chéret (artist)
- Roach Killer by B. Legrand (author) and Jacques Tardi (artist)
- Titeuf by Zep
- Valérian and Laureline by Pierre Christin (author) and Jean-Claude Mézières (artist)
- Zig et Puce by Alain Saint-Ogan, later revived by Greg
- HK by Kévin Hérault and Jean-David Morvan.

== Germany (Comic) ==
- Captain Berlin created by Jörg Buttgereit
- Fix und Foxi created by Rolf Kauka
- Das kleine Arschloch by Walter Moers
- Mosaik created by Hannes Hegen
- Nick Knatterton created by Manfred Schmidt
- Sigurd by Hansrudi Wäscher
- Various gay comics by Ralf König
- Werner by Brösel

== Greece ==
- O Κόκκορας / The Rooster - 1981, created by Arkas
- Show Business - 1983, created by Arkas
- Ξυπνάς Μέσα Μου Το Ζώο / You Bring Out the Animal in Me - 1985, created by Arkas
- Μετά την καταστροφή / After the Destruction - 1986, created by Arkas
- Φάε το κερασάκι / Eat the Cherry - 1987, created by Arkas
- Ο Παντελής Και Το Λιοντάρι / Pantelis and the Lion - 1987, created by Arkas
- Αταίριαστοι Έρωτες / Ιncongruous Love - 1988, created by Arkas
- Ο Ισοβίτης / The Lifer - 1988, created by Arkas
- Χαμηλές Πτήσεις / Flying Starts - 1991, created by Arkas
- Καστράτο / Castrato - 1995, created by Arkas
- Πειραματόζωα / Animal Testing - 1998, created by Arkas
- Ο καλός λύκος / The Big Good Wolf - 1998, created by Arkas
- Η Ζωή Μετά / The Hereafter - 1999, created by Arkas
- Οι Συνομήλικοι / Peers, created by Arkas
- Θηρία Ενήμερα, created by Arkas
- Το Μικρό και το Μεγάλο / The Small and the Big, created by Arkas
- Επικίνδυνα Νερά / Dangerous Waters, created by Arkas
- Blood Opera - 2004, created by Ilias Kyriazis
- Blockbuster, created by Ilias Kyriazis
- Turta - 2006, created by Ilias Kyriazis and Tassos Papaioannou
- Manifesto - 2005, created by Ilias Kyriazis
- Manifesto 2 - 2009, created by Ilias Kyriazis
- Μια καρδιά για τον Λεοντόκαρδο / Falling for Lionheart - 2011, created by Ilias Kyriazis
- Galaxia, created by Manos Lagouvardos
- Logicomix - 2008, created by Apostolos Doxiadis, Christos Papadimitriou, Alecos Papadatos and Annie Di Donna
- Giant-size Fascists, created by Con Chrisoulis
- Κρακ Κόμικς / Krak Komiks, created by Tasos Maragkos (Tasmar)
- Apocalypse Mode On - 2010, created by Giorgos Kampadaes
- Ύψιλον / Ypsilon - 2004, created by Vasilis Chilas and Thanos Kollias

== Indonesia ==
- Archi & Meidy, by Yohanes Surya and Wendy Vega
- Si Juki, by Faza Meonk
- Archipelago, by Chancil (Candra Dwiyanto)
- KOSMIK Mook, by Sunny GHO

== Israel ==
- Zbeng! by Uri Fink
- Rutu Modan#Exit Wounds by Rutu Modan

== Kuwait ==
Teshkeel Comics

- The 99

== Lebanon ==
- Anxiety

== Malaysia ==
- Kecemprengman
- BoBoiBoy Galaxy

== Mexico (historieta or monitos) ==
- Los Agachados by Rius
- El Cerdotado by Leopoldo Jasso
- La familia Burrón by Gabriel Vargas
- Kalimán
- El Pantera
- Hombres y Héroes
- Karmatron by Oscar Gonzalez Loyo
- Los Supermachos by Rius
- Ultrapato by Edgar Delgado

== Nigeria ==
- Supa Strikas by Chevron
- Monsters:Rise of the X5 by Joseph Livingstone and Marvel comics

== The Netherlands (stripverhaal) ==
- Agent 327 by Martin Lodewijk.
- De Avonturen van Pa Pinkelman by Godfried Bomans (author) and Carol Voges (artist).
- Bello by Marten Toonder.
- Birre Beer by Phiny Dick (author) and Ton Beek (artist).
- Boes by Wil Raymakers and Thijs Wilms.
- Bulletje en Boonestaak by Georges van Raemdonck.
- Claire by the Wirojas (Robert van der Kroft, Wilbert Plijnaar and Jan Van Die).
- Dick Bos by Alfred Mazure.
- Dirk-Jan by Mark Retera.
- Douwe Dabbert by Thom Roep (author) and Piet Wijn (artist).
- Eric de Noorman by Hans G. Kresse
- De Familie Doorzon by Gerrit de Jager.
- De Familie Fortuin by Peter de Wit.
- F.C Knudde by Toon van Driel.
- Flippie Flink by Clinge Doorenbos (author) and Robert Raemaekers (artist).
- Fokke & Sukke by Bastiaan Geleijnse, John Reid (author) and Jean-Marc Tol (artist).
- Fokkie Flink by Henk de Wolf (author), Joop Geesink and Henk Zwart (artist).
- Franka by Henk Kuijpers.
- De Generaal by Peter de Smet.
- Gilles de Geus by Hanco Kolk & Peter de Wit.
- Haagse Harry by Marnix Rueb.
- Heinz by Eddie De Jong en René Windig.
- Holle Pinkel by Andries Brandt and Piet Wijn.
- Jan, Jans en de Kinderen by Jan Kruis.
- Joop Klepzeiker by Eric Schreurs.
- Kapitein Rob by Pieter Kuhn.
- Kappie by Marten Toonder.
- Kick Wilstra by Henk Sprenger.
- Koning Hollewijn by Marten Toonder.
- Panda by Phiny Dick, Harry van den Eerenbeemt (author) and Marten Toonder (artist).
- Paulus the woodgnome by Jean Dulieu.
- Roel Dijkstra by Jan Steeman and Andrew Brandt.
- Sigmund by Peter De Wit.
- S1NGLE by Hanco Kolk & Peter de Wit.
- Sjef van Oekel by Wim T. Schippers (author) and Theo van den Boogaard (artist).
- Sjors & Sjimmie by Frans Piët.
- Storm by Don Lawrence (artist).
- Tekko Taks by Henk Kabos and James Ringrose.
- Tom Puss (Tom Poes) by Marten Toonder.
- Vader & Zoon by Peter van Straaten.
- Van Nul tot Nu by Thom Roep (author) and Co Loerakker (artist).

== Norway (tegneserier) ==
- M by Mads Eriksen
- Nemi by Lise Myhre
- Pondus by Frode Øverli
- Lunch by Børge Lund

== Pakistan ==
- Team Muhafiz by AzCorp Comics
- Zindan: The Last Ansaars by Omar Mirza and Khurram Methabin

== Poland (komiks) ==
- Awantury i wybryki małej małpki Fiki-Miki by Kornel Makuszyński (author) and Marian Walentynowicz (artist)
- Biblia by Jerzy Wróblewski
- Binio Bill by Jerzy Wróblewski
- Biocosmosis by Edvin Volinski (author) and Nikodem Cabała (artist)
- Dziesięciu z wielkiej ziemi by Jerzy Wróblewski
- Funky Koval by Maciej Parowski, Jacek Rodek (authors), and Boguslaw Polch (artist)
- Gail by Piotr Kowalski
- Janosik by Tadeusz Kwiatkowski and prof. Jerzy Skarzynski (artist)
- Jeż Jerzy by Rafał Skarżycki and Tomasz Lew Leśniak
- Kajtek i Koko and Kajko i Kokosz by Janusz Christa
- Kapitan Kloss by Andrzej Zbych and Mieczyslaw Wisniewski
- Kapitan Żbik created by Władysław Krupka
- Na co dybie w wielorybie czubek nosa Eskimosa by Tadeusz Baranowski
- Pilot smiglowca by Witold Jarkowski (author) and Grzegorz Rosinski (artist)
- Przygody Kleksa by Szarlota Pawel
- Przygody Koziołka Matołka by Kornel Makuszyński (author) and Marian Walentynowicz (artist)
- Straine by Krzysztof Tkaczyk and Bartosz Minkiewicz
- Tajemnica złotej maczety by Jerzy Wróblewski
- Tytus, Romek i A'tomek by Henryk Chmielewski
- Walenty Pompka na wojnie by Ryszard Kiersnowski (author) and Marian Walentynowicz (artist)
- Wick i Wacek by Wacław Drozdowski

== Puerto Rico ==
- Juan Bobo by Puerto Rican school children
- United States of Banana by Puerto Rican author Giannina Braschi and Swedish cartoonist Joakim Lingengren
- La Borinquena by Puerto Rican artist Edgardo Miranda-Rodriguez.

== Russia (комиксы) ==
- Major Grom by Artyom Gabrelyanov and Evgeny Fedotov
- Demonslayer^{[ru]} by Alex Hatchett and Evgeniy Fedotov
- Exlibrium by Natalia Devova
- Red Fury by Artyom Gabrelyanov and Sergei Volkov
- Friar by Artyom Gabrelyanov and Alexei Gravitskii
- Meteora by Artyom Gabrelyanov and Igor Khudaev
- Survilo by Olga Lavrentyeva
- ILya Muromets. Pesn' Solovya by Roman Sheverdin
- Hacker by Aleksandr Eremin
- Sobakistan by Vitaliy Terletsky
- Kot by Oleg Tishchenkov
- Les by Askold Akishin
- Mobi Bi by Daniil Vetluzhskih
- Diptih by Alexey Troshin

== Serbia ==
- Cat Claw
- Kobra
- Tarzan (Serbian Version)
- Billy the Spit
- Technotise
- Generation Tesla
- Faktor 4
- Prijatelji (comics)

== South Africa ==
- Cottonstar by Ben G Geldenhuys and Danelle Malan
- Gofu (comic) by Deon de Lange
- Juvies (comic) by Jarred Cramer
- Madam & Eve
- The Lil' Five by They Did This!
- Oneironaut & Other Tales by Daniel Hugo
- Rebirth (graphic novel) by Josh Ryba and Daniel Browde
- Week Daze by Andrew Cramer
- Wrath (comic) by Christopher Beukes

== Sweden (tecknade serier) ==
- Arne Anka by Charlie Christensen
- Bamse by Rune Andréasson
- Örn Blammo by Johan Wanloo
- Bobo by Lars Mortimer
- Felix by Jan Lööf
- Ratte by Magnus Knutsson and Ulf Jansson
- Rocky by Martin Kellerman
- Ensamma mamman by Cecilia Torudd
- Röde Orm by Charlie Christensen
- Socker-Conny by Joakim Pirinen
- Kapten Stofil by Joakim Lindengren

== Switzerland (bande dessinée, BD, bédés) ==
- Yakari by Job (author) & Derib (artist)

== United Arab Emirates ==
- Majid

== United Kingdom ==
=== Other children's anthology comics ===
- Buster
- Cor!!
- The Eagle
- Lion
- Scream!
- Tiger
- Valiant
- Victor
- Whizzer and Chips

=== Other ===
- 2000 AD
- Book of Pages
- The Adventures of Luther Arkwright and The Tale of One Bad Rat by Bryan Talbot
- From Hell by Alan Moore (author) and Eddie Campbell (artist)
- Night Warrior
- Marshal Law by Pat Mills and Kevin O'Neill
- Sam119
- Trigan Empire by Don Lawrence
- V for Vendetta by Alan Moore (author) and David Lloyd (artist)
- Viz comic
- Warrior

== See also ==
- List of newspaper comic strips
- List of comics by country
- List of comic creators
- List of feminist comic books
- Lists of books
- Lists of comics
