= Hombres (disambiguation) =

Hombres, the plural of Hombre and sometimes used informally in English, may refer to:

== Film and television ==
- Hombres, a Norwegian-Swedish drama series
- Hombres de barro, a 1988 Argentine film
- Hombres de honor, a 2005 Argentine telenovela
- Hombres de esta tierra, a 1922 Chilean silent film
- Men of the Sea (1938 Mexican film), originally known as Hombres de Mar

== Music ==
- The Hombres, a 1960s American garage rock band
- "Hombres" (song), a song recorded by Spanish singer Eva Santamaría
- "Hombres al Borde de un Ataque de Celos", a dance song written by J.R. Florez
- Hombres Con Pañales (K-Narias), an album by K-Narias
- Hombres G, a Spanish pop rock band
  - Hombres G (album), their debut album

== Other uses ==
- Hombres (slamball team) (formerly the Diablos), the Slamball team
- Hombres y Héroes, a series of Mexican comics
- Los Hombres del Camuflaje, a Mexican sibling professional wrestling tag team
- Men of Maize, originally known as Hombres de Maíz, a 1949 novel by Miguel Ángel Asturias

== See also ==
- Hombre (disambiguation), the singular of Hombres
- Ombre, a seventeenth-century trick-taking card game
- Ombré, the gradual blending of one color hue to another
