= List of comics by country =

Comics have followed different paths of development throughout the world.

== Africa ==
- South Africa

== Asia ==
- China and Taiwan
  - Hong Kong
- India
- Japan (History)
- Pakistan (History)
- Philippines
- South Korea (Webtoon)
- Thailand
- Turkey
- Vietnam

== Europe ==
- Czech
- Croatia
- Franco-Belgian (France and Belgium)
  - Belgium
  - Manfra
- Germany
- Hungary
- Ireland
- Italy
- Netherlands
- Poland
- Portugal
- Serbia
- Spain
- United Kingdom
  - Northern Ireland
  - Wales

== North America ==
- Canada
  - Canadian Whites
  - Québec
- Mexico
- United States
  - History
    - Golden Age
    - Silver Age
    - Bronze Age
    - Modern Age
- Puerto Rican comic books

== Oceania ==
- Australia

== South America ==
- Argentina
- Brazil

== See also ==
- List of comic books
- List of years in comics
- Table of years in comics
