= Tomica (comics) =

Tomica is a South African webcomic, written by David Covas Lourenco and drawn by Deon de Lange.

Deon de Lange is the creator of the comic, Gofu, and launched the Tomica webcomic in April 2014 with collaborator, David Covas Lourenco. A limited edition of 50 copies of a Tomica mini comic were for sale at Reader's Den Free Comic Book Day 2014.

The Tomica webcomic is also collected and printed in a unique mini-comic format, starting with Tomica #1.

== Story ==
Tomica is a "sci-fi adventure following Tomica Twim's quest through ancient temples, disintegrating space ports, and steamy jungles across the universe".

== Publication history ==
At San Diego Comic-Con in 2014, Tomica mini-comic #1 was available as a free giveaway at a panel about comics from South Africa and Australia: “The Pursuit of the Southern Hemisphere Comics Industry”.

== See also ==
- Gofu (comic)
- South African comics
- List of comic books
