= Tuomola =

Tuomola is a Finnish surname. Notable people with the surname include:

- Andrei Tuomola, Finnish swimmer
- Jussi Tuomola (born 1965), Finnish cartoonist
- Karita Tykkä (born 1976), née Tuomola, Finnish television host, actress, and model
