= Groud =

Groud may refer to:

- Groud (mathematics), an algebraic structure
- Gilbert G. Groud, African artist
