= Cottonstar =

South African webcomic

Cottonstar is an ongoing South African webcomic, written, drawn and self published by Danelle Malan and Ben Geldenhuys. It was created in 2008, but only launched in 2011. In 2012, it was self-published in print as a comic book for the first time.

Cottonstar forms part of the post-2007 independent comics boom in South Africa, in which several independent publishers have begun to produce work that significantly improves the diversity and mainstream presence of comics available in the country.

== Plot ==
The dystopian fiction story is set in an alternate future Cape Town in which most of the present day land masses of the world are covered with water, as a result of global warming. The story follows the protagonist, Renier du Preez, as he experiences life aboard the ship Cottonstar, on which he holds the position of ship's boy.

Fleeing from 'the Corporation', Renier du Preez, a former Corporation ninja, joins the crew of a small sailing ship, the Cottonstar, captained by Domino Hartwick. Later, the ship sails to the Dragon’s Teeth, where they pick up another crew member, Ford Visagie, Vuis' cousin, and Domino is told of the Corporation’s expansion plans. However, an attack on Renier by 'vipers' (Corporation ninjas) leads to an explosion, meaning the crew have to leave abruptly. Later, Noah tells Renier his early life as an assassin, and how he came to know Reka (then a surgeon), and how he came to be recruited. The crew heads to the Brandwag Buttress (now partially submerged) where Noah is assaulted by Mara, a sabre-cat assassin.

== Characters ==
Main protagonists include:

- Domino Hartwick: Captain of the Cottonstar.
- Noah: a sabre-cat, a former assassin, and the ship's ballistics expert.
- Reka: The ship's cook, in love with Renier.
- Renier du Preez: The ship's boy, and a skilled fighter with a broom.
- Vuis Visagie: The ship's mechanic.

The main antagonist party is an organisation known as "the Corporation."

== See also ==
- South African comics
- List of comic books
