= South African comics =

A South African comic is a book or periodical published in South Africa that contains sequential art stories.

South African comics are usually self-published books that cover a wide range of subject matter and styles.

== List of South African comics ==
The following list represents comics that are currently available in print:

- Agenda (2012–present)
- Azani comics (2005–present)
- Clockworx (2005)
- Captain South Africa (2015-present)
- Crimson (2013–present)
- Dark Encounters (2020)
- Echo Gear (2013–present)
- Free Beer (2010–present)
- GEP (2009–2011)
- GEP Pulp (2011–2014)
- Gofu (2013–present)
- Iron Nail Afternoon (2020–present)
- Juvies (2012)
- Kwezi (2013-present)
- Madam & Eve (1992–present)
- Mengelmoes (2013–2016; complete)
- Nero (2013–present)
- Philo's Wish (2013)
- Project Tilian-Rep (2013)
- Psi-Ave bi-annual graphic magazine (2000; 7 issues)
- Rebirth (2012)
- Run! There's Dinosaurs In The City (2014)
- SECTOR (2015–present; 10 issues)
- Soccer Warrior (2002–2018)
- Sophie the Giant Slayer (2013–present)
- Super Dud (2014)
- Supa Strikas (2008-present)
- The Baby Killers (2014)
- The Cat Lady (2014)
- The Lil' Five (2012–present)
- The Number 1 Game (2013–present)
- The Oneironaut & Other Tales (2013)
- The Souvenir (2014)
- The Tree Of Life Trilogy (2014–present)
- The Way of Tao and Zen (2014)
- Velocity Graphic Anthology (2010–2015)
- Velocity: Darker Forces (2014)
- Wrath (2013)
- Zana (2015–present)

== List of South African webcomics ==
The following list represents comics that are currently available in webcomic format:

- Cottonstar (2012–present)
- Juvies (2008–present)
- Kowakawaii01: Grim (2018–present)
- Mars Comics' The Book of Reality (2019–present)
- Rise (2020-present)
- Tomica (2014–present)
- Druidae (2022-present)
- Smoke Fur And Stone (2014–present)
- Super-Dud (2013–present)
- United Stars Comic Book (2020–present)
- Vibe Comics (2015–present)
- Week Daze (2008–present)

== Notable South African comic book events ==
2013 saw the biggest ever Free Comic Book Day event organised in Cape Town by Readers Den, a comic shop in Cape Town. Local comic creators launch their new publications and showcase their work at these events.

The 2014 Reader's Den Free Comic Book Day event saw the launch of 15 new South African comic books, with some creators traveling from different parts of South Africa for the event. The Reader's Den Free Comic Book Day event was replaced in 2016 with FanCon Cape Town Comic Con, an international comics convention that is held annually in April.

The Open Book Comics Fest forms part of the annual Open Book Festival, which takes place every September in Cape Town. The Open Book Comics Fest promotes South African comic artists, illustrators and cartoonists and includes a marketplace of over 40 tables, curated by Moray Rhoda.

Comic Con Africa debuted in Johannesburg in September 2018.

These comic book related events host market places where local comic creators sell and sign their self-published comics, launch new comics and deliver comic-industry-related talks, panels, and workshops.

== Notable South African comic book creators ==
One of the most successful South African comic creators working on international comic titles and publications is Joe Daly, the creator of The Red Monkey, Scrublands, Highbone Theater and the Dungeon Quest series. Highbone Theater and Dungeon Quest are published in the USA by Fantagraphics Books. In Europe, Dungeon Quest is published by L'Association. It was nominated for the Ignatz and Eisner awards and won the coveted Angoulême Jury Prize. His work has been described as "surreal, scatological, yet grounded in its depiction of loneliness and longing." Slings & Arrows praised it as "an irreverent satire of geek culture."

Other South African comic creators with international publications include Karl Stephan, the author of Sparko, published by SLG; Sean Izaakse, an artist on Pathfinder for Dynamite Entertainment and various Marvel Comics titles; Jason Masters, who has worked for DC Comics on various titles, including Batman, and for Dynamite Entertainment on James Bond; and Lauren Beukes and Dale Halvorsen, who co-wrote Survivors' Club for DC/Vertigo. Artist Warren Louw illustrates variant covers for KRS Comics.

LJ Phillips has contributed work to Borderx, Future Sci-Fi Tales, Horror Haikus, The Red Ten, Iron Nail Afternoon and Dark Encounters among others. Her work has been published under her own name and a male pseudonym. Some of her articles on comics were published by Black Ship Books and included in Into the Comics-Verse: Comics and Contemporary Culture. She has interviewed international comic creators such as Terry Moore, Stjepan Sejic, Liam Sharp and Tracy Butler. In August 2020, LJ was the recipient of a comic grant by Eisner-nominated publisher Shortbox. and in 2022, was included in the Otherwise honours list.

== Afrikaans comics ==
There also exists a smaller Afrikaans scene. Notable examples include the alternative and acidic adult comics produced by the Bitterkomix collective, which was founded in 1992 by Anton Kannemeyer and Conrad Botes, as well as the gritty Coloureds series by brothers Nathan and Andre Trantraal.

== Retailers ==
- Readers Den Comic Shop (Cape Town)
- Outer Limits (Cape Town, Johannesburg, Pretoria)

== See also ==
- Media of South Africa
- List of comic books
