= Supa Strikas (TV series) =

Animated football TV series

- Genre: Sports
- Created by: Alex Kramer
- Based on: Supa Strikas
- Written by: Bruce Legg; Greig Cameron; Lucy Heavens
- Directed by: Bruce Legg
- Creative director: Alex Kramer
- Starring: Nolan Balzer; Kevin Aichele; Wayne Buss; Brian Cook; Geoff Hughes; Davide Montebruno; Corny Rempel; Sambath San; Robyn Slade; Daniel Thau-Eleff
- Theme music composer: Olaf Pyttlik; Nolan Balzer
- Opening theme: "Supa Strikas" performed by Kevin Aichele
- Countries of origin: South Africa; Malaysia
- Original language: English
- No. of seasons: 7
- No. of episodes: 91 (list of episodes)

Production
- Executive producer: Richard Morgan-Grenville
- Editor: Gregan Tarlton
- Running time: 22 minutes
- Production companies: Strika Entertainment; Animasia Studio; DaCapo Productions

Original release
- Network: Disney Channel; Cartoon Network; Nickelodeon; YouTube
- Release: December 6, 2008 – 2020

Supa Strikas is an animated television series centered on the titular football team, based on the pan-African football-themed comic of the same name. The series is produced in Malaysia by Animasia Studio, and in South Africa by Strika Entertainment.

== Production ==
The series was produced by Strika Entertainment, a South African-based comics and animation production studio until 2019, when the entire franchise was acquired by Moonbug Entertainment.

== Release ==
The show is broadcast in all Supa Strikas territories. In South Africa season one was previously broadcast on SABC 1 and SABC 2 until the rights were taken over by E.tv, which is yet to broadcast the latest season, which is currently on Disney XD and Cartoon Network (Africa), across Southeast Asia on STAR Sports Asia and Disney Channel Asia, in Zambia on ZNBC, in Israel on ZOOM, in Panama on TVMax and across Latin America on ESPN Latin America. Meanwhile, in India and Pakistan, Supa Strikas can also be seen on Nickelodeon Sonic and Nick HD+, In Canada on Citytv, in Chile on Canal 13, in Morocco on 2M TV, in France on Orange and Canal+, in Qatar on JeemTV, in Malaysia on Disney XD Asia and TV2 (previously on TV3 and TV9), in Hungary on TV2, in the Philippines on ABS-CBN and Studio 23 (now ABS-CBN Sports+Action) and in Poland on ZigZap, Teletoon+, TVP ABC and Disney XD in Turkey and the United Kingdom on Pluto TV, in Portugal on SIC K and in Singapore on Mediacorp Suria. And soon to be telecast again on Hungama TV from 21 December 2020 7:30 pm.

== Spin-off ==
On November 23, 2021, Supa Strikas' official YouTube channel released a trailer of their brand new series titled "Rookie Season". The trailer announced the series release date to be- 3 December 2021. It was said to be a YouTube Original series. It focuses on How Shakes joined Supa Strikas. "Rookie Season kicks back to where it all started for Supa Strikas’ youngest star. Join Shakes on a series of misadventures, as he gets betrayed by his best friend, searches for his dad and mystifies his sister, risking everything for one shot at joining the world's most epic soccer team and raising a little thing called the Super League!" On December 3rd 2021, Supa Strikas' official YouTube channel released 6 episodes of "Rookie Season." An official date for the rest (7-12) has not been announced. However, the 7th episode of the series was released on April 15, 2022. The 8th episode released on April 22, 2022. With this, many have concluded the series will release the next 4 episodes weekly. The series has officially been made weekly; the 9th episode released on April 29, 2022. Also, 10th and 11th episode was released during starting two weeks of May 2022.

== Reception ==
The series got 7.7/10 points, rated by IMDb. The series has received criticism for its lack of main female characters.
