= K-Narias =

Spanish reggaeton duo of twin sisters

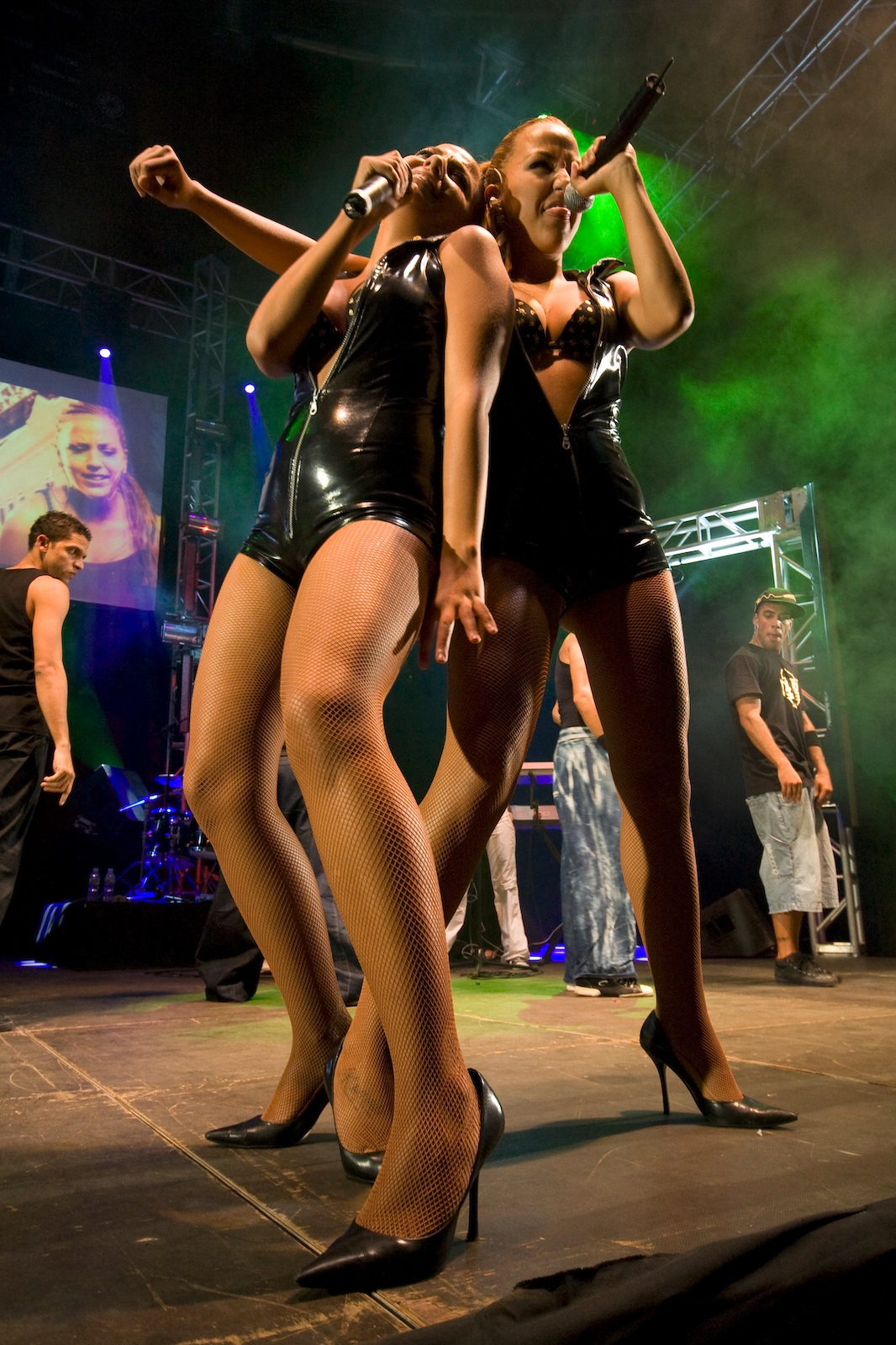

Background information
- Born: Gara Hernández January 12, 1984 (age 42); Loida Hernández January 12, 1984 (age 42); Santa Cruz de Tenerife, Canary Islands, Spain
- Origin: Canary Islands, Spain
- Genres: Reggaeton, Pop
- Works: Yes We Are, 40 Entre Las 2, Hombres Con Pañales, Cuando Seas Grande Lo Entenderás
- Years active: 2004–present
- Labels: Estudios Multitrack (Spain); UBO (USA); DCM Records (Mexico)
- Members: Gara Hernández; Loida Hernández
- Website: www.k-narias.net

K-Narias is a Spanish reggaeton pop music duo composed of twin sisters Gara and Loida Hernández. The group gained recognition with their debut album, 40 Entre Las 2, which was certified Gold in Spain.

== Career ==
K-Narias' most popular songs of the 2000s were "40 Entre las 2," "No Te Vistas que No Te Vas," and "Un Pedacito de Navidad." "40 Entre las 2" was released in 2007 and reached Gold in Spain. "Un Pedacito de Navidad" was recorded alongside José Feliciano.

In 2009, the duo performed at Madison Square Garden in New York, at a private party for NBA stars in San Juan, Puerto Rico, and at the Playboy Mansion in Los Angeles.

In 2010, they toured with Puerto Rican rapper Don Omar, traveling to more than 20 cities in the U.S. Between 2011 and 2014, they collaborated with artists Carmen Salinas, Jerry Rivera, and Elvis Crespo. They also performed in a women's prison and participated in a campaign against school violence alongside Barcelona goalkeeper Víctor Valdés.

In 2015, they received a double Platinum Record in Spain with their song "La conocí dancing," which reached number one on Spotify in the country.

== Discography ==
- 40 entre las 2 - 2005 Gold (+50,000)
- Hombres Con Pañales - 2006 (CD and DVD) (+35,000)
- K-N - 2007 (15,000)
- Cuando Seas Grande Lo Entenderas - 2008 (+5,000)
- La Trayectoria - 2010 (1,000)
- Yes we are - 2013 (+10,000)

== Music videos ==
- "Oye Mi Canto Feat.Barbero"
- "No Te Vistas Que No Vas" (+50,000)
- "Todos Tenemos Que Luchar"
- "Quiero Que Bailen"
- "Un pedacito de navidad" Feat. Jose Feliciano
- "Himno de Canarias"
- "Abusadora"
- "No vale la pena" (+1,000)
- "Ni tu ni yo"
- "Take It Easy"
- "De canarias para el mundo"
- "El que a hierro mata" (+5,000)
- "Juntitos los dos"
- "La conoci bailando" 2× Platinum (+100,000)
- "Pechito"
- "#Traicionero"
- "Díselo" ft. Miguel Saéz
- "Mujeres"
- "Tu Indiferencia"
- "Las Que Mandan"
- "Tu Novio y el Mío"

== Awards ==
=== Premios Ace Nueva York ===
- Premio Ace De Nueva York

=== Premios Fama ===
- Artista Revelacion 2008

=== Premios Estrella ===
- Mejor Duo Del Año 2008

== See also ==
- Canarian people
- Canarian Spanish
