= 40 Entre Las 2 =

Studio album by K-Narias
- Released: November 25, 2005
- Recorded: 2005
- Genre: Reggaeton
- Label: MultiTrack
- Producers: Master Chris; Luny Tunes; Noriega; Robert Taylor

K-Narias chronology
40 Entre Las 2 (2005)	Hombres con Pañales (2006)

40 Entre Las 2 is the debut album by K-Narias, a reggaeton duo from the Canary Islands. The album features urban Latin music with lyrics that address social issues, including women's rights. As part of their advocacy against gender violence, the duo launched the campaign "No a la violencia de género", aimed at raising awareness among young audiences. The campaign included the song "Todos Tenemos Que Luchar", accompanied by a music video directed by Eddy Cardellach.

40 Entre Las 2 sold 50,000 copies in the Canary Islands within three months of its release.

== Track listing ==
1. Intro
2. Yo soy tu hombre (featuring Nicky Jam)
3. No te vistas que no vas
4. En este infierno (featuring Julio Voltio)
5. Despierta (featuring Don Chezina)
6. Ya llegó el reggaeton
7. Quiero que bailen (featuring Pedro Prez)
8. Tú te entregas a mi
9. Provocándome (featuring Mr. Phillips)
10. Beso volando (featuring Barbero)
11. Manos arriba
12. Necesito decirte algo (Balada)
