= Magie Noire =

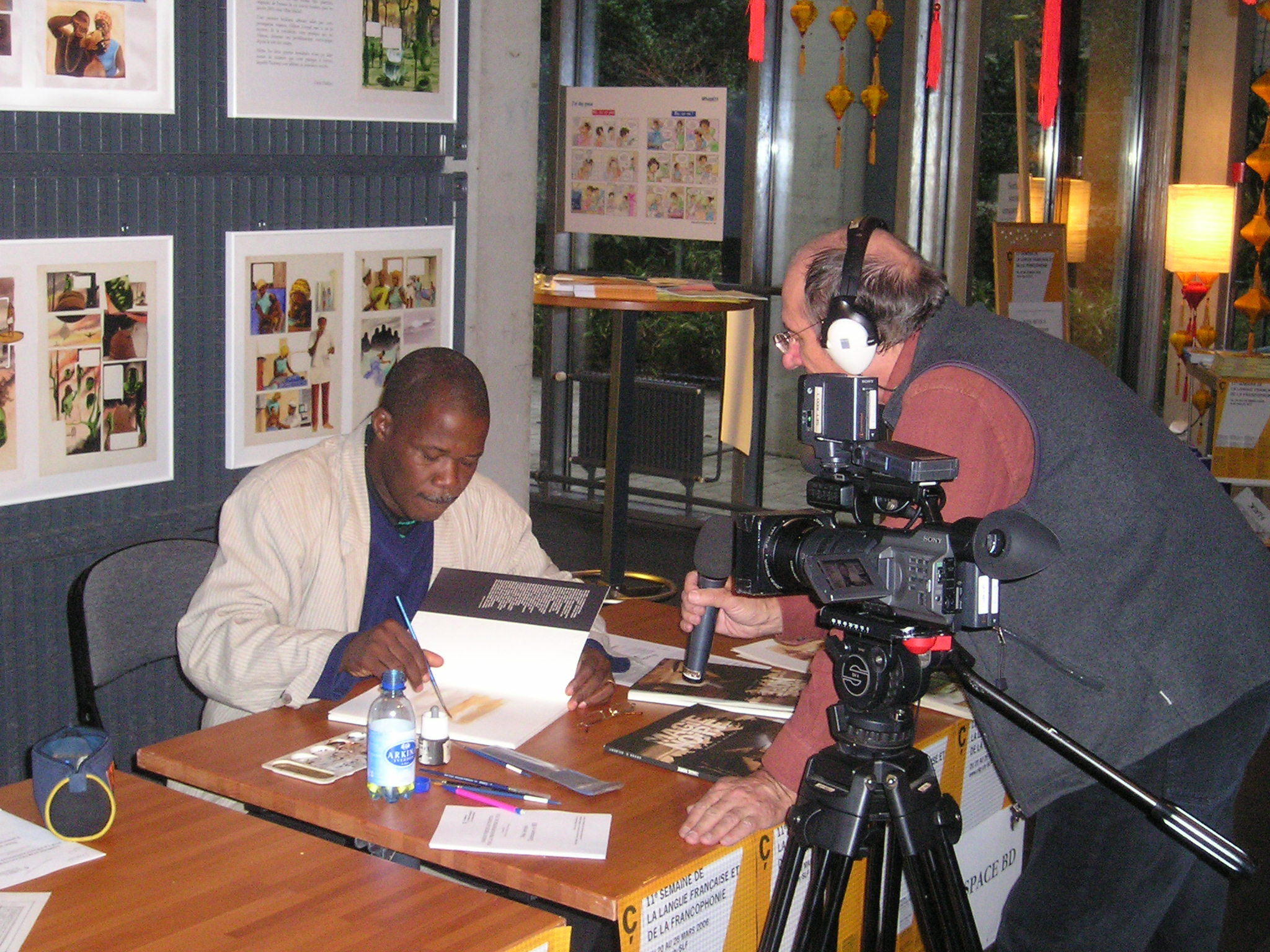
Gilbert G. Groud signs "Magie Noire", 20 March 2006, Switzerland

"Magie Noire" ("Black Magic") is a comics series by the Ivorian painter and author Gilbert G. Groud. It deals with the dangers of black magic in Africa.

The story is about a father who is married to several women. His favourite wife Zoé has only one child. To proceed in sorcery and earn a position of higher power, he is required to sacrifice this last son. The child is sacrificed in the world of ghosts. In the real world, he falls very sick and throws up daily. The mother, who is not into black magic, takes the child to a hospital. The doctors can not find out what is wrong. Still the situation of the child worsens.

The illustrations were drawn by hand with ink. The mood is sad and dark which can also be seen in the pictures that are painted in green and brown. Pictures showing the real world are suddenly painted in bright colors. This contrast shows the difference between the real world and the frightening, dangerous world of ghosts.

Groud converted to Christianity in 1985, but comes from a family that practised sorcery. His point of view is a very critical one.

== Editions ==
- Gilbert G. Groud: Magie Noire. Albin Michel, Paris 2003, ISBN 2-226-13642-8
- Gilbert G. Groud: Magie noire, Tome 2 Vent des savanes, 2008, ISBN 978-2-35626-011-6

== Sources ==
English articles:

- http://lambiek.net/artists/g/groud_gilbert.htm

French articles:

- https://web.archive.org/web/20071026085124/http://www.radiofrance.fr/franceinter/em/cosmopolitaine/index.php?id=14236
- http://www.africultures.com/index.asp?menu=affiche_murmure&no_murmure=903
