= Super Cholita =

Bolivian comic book

Súper Cholita
- Súper Cholita, from the first issue of the comic

Publication information
- Publisher: Republica
- First appearance: Súper Cholita #1 (May 2007)
- Created by: Rolando Valdez; Santos Callisaya

In-story information
- Alter ego: Francisca Pizzaro Mamani
- Abilities: Flight, strength, toughness, wrestling skills

Súper Cholita is a Bolivian comic book character created by Rolando Valdez and Santos Callisaya in 2007. She is the eponymous heroine of a popular comic inspired by local female wrestlers and Japanese comics, "perhaps ... the best-selling title in the history of Bolivian comics." Her humorous, ironic adventures are written by Valdez and illustrated by Callisaya and Gladys Castro Mamani.

== Character portrayal ==
Súper Cholita is portrayed as "a folksy incarnation of a female superhero rooted in a combination of Japanese aesthetics, Mexican cultural tradition, and Bolivian politics." Her super powers, including that of flight, emanate from the sacred temple of Tiwanaku, and she is costumed in the heavy blanket skirts of the Altiplano. In her civilian identity, she is the Aymara woman Francisca Pizzaro Mamani, daughter of a cholita and a nameless pepino (a traditional carnival clown often deemed responsible for fatherless children), and granddaughter of a mythical highland frog. Her love interest is a policeman.

While Súper Cholita uses her powers to help the poor, her behavior is not always as exemplary as that of most superheroes. She has been shown as a boastful, strident complainer, inclined to stuff herself with rellenos de papa, who is not above pilfering from a female potato vendor or bribing a policeman to avoid arrest. She possesses strong views, detesting imperialism and corrupt politicos, criticizing looters, and standing against the autonomy movements threatening Bolivia's unity.
