= Viivi & Wagner =

Finnish comic strip

- Author: Jussi "Juba" Tuomola
- Current status/schedule: Running
- Launch date: October 1997
- Genre(s): Satire, Gag-a-day

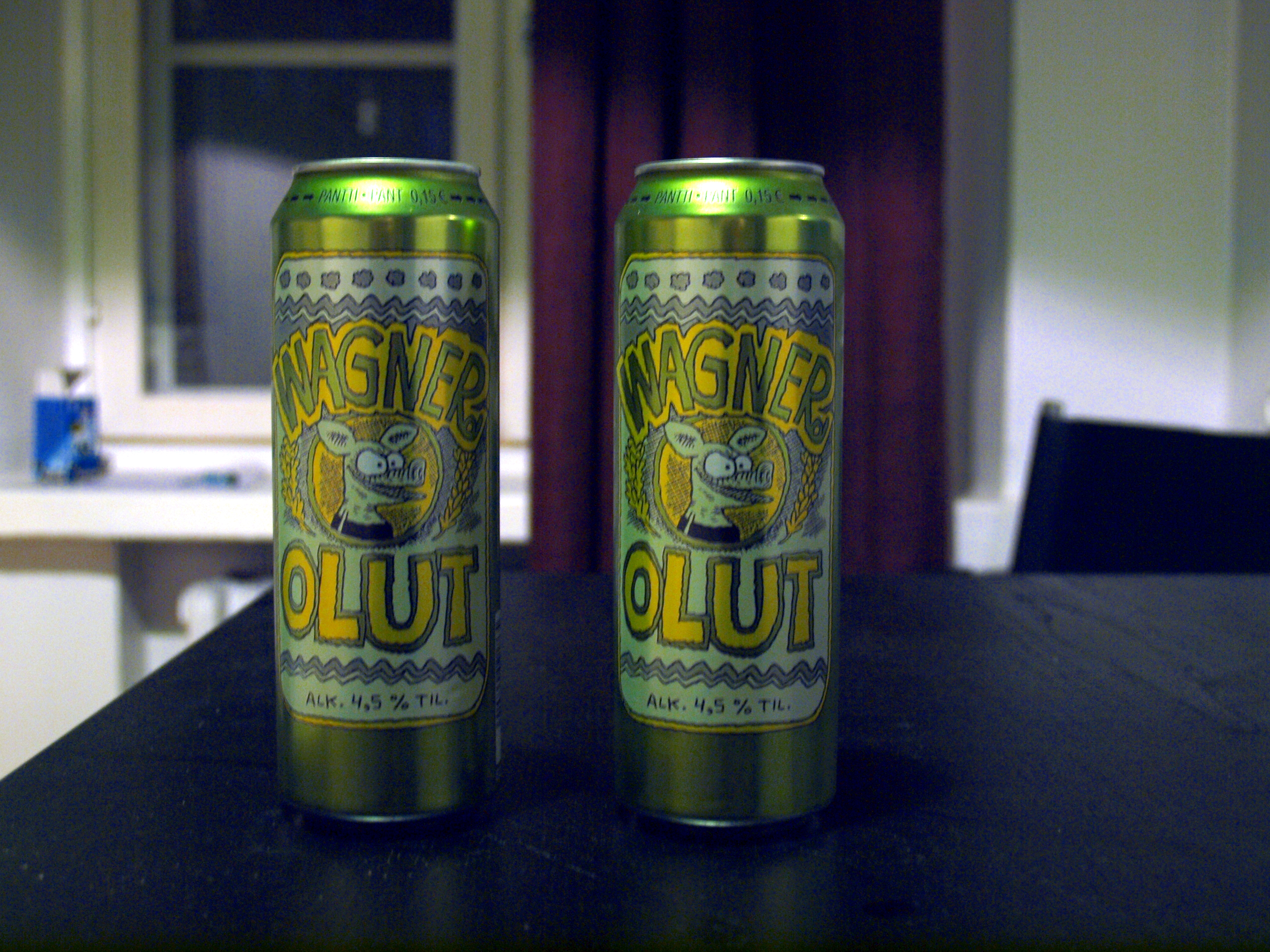
Viivi & Wagner has, unusually for Finnish comics, spawned spin-off products in the form of alcoholic beverages: "Wagner" lager beer and "Viivi" light perry cider.

Viivi & Wagner is a somewhat absurdist Finnish newspaper gag-a-day comic strip drawn since 1997 by Jussi "Juba" Tuomola.

By June 2022, nearly 25 years after its debut, over 7,300 Viivi & Wagner daily strips had been published, and these were republished as 25 compilation albums. The concept has also been adapted for the stage, as well as for audio books.

Viivi & Wagner has been exported to eg. Sweden, Estonia, Japan and China.

== Concept ==
The titular main characters are Viivi, a Finnish woman in her twenties, and Wagner, a mature male pig. Wagner is fully anthropomorphic and sentient, yet still considers himself a pig instead of a human. Though often mistaken for married, the two are cohabitating in an Odd Couple-ish relationship and genuinely fond of each other when not bickering.

The comic originally appeared in Kultapossu, a promotional children's magazine by a Finnish bank. In the original version of the comic, Viivi was a small girl and Wagner was her animate piggy bank. When the Kultapossu magazine was discontinued, Tuomola adapted the characters to fit a newspaper comic strip style, also changing the characters to adults in the process.

Viivi & Wagner is extremely popular in Finland. Most of the strips concern either arguments between Viivi and Wagner ("You ate the wrapper, too?!" "I always eat the wrapper."), or Wagner getting into totally absurd situations, either in everyday life or in a fantasy world ("I'm stuck in the moment before the Big Bang"). Some strips break the fourth wall ("Hey, your outline is loose.") or the classic comic strip format by not having a definite punchline at the end.

Some readers, who have been unaware of the strip's history in a bank's promotional magazine for children, have taken Wagner's porcine appearance as a statement of feminism, specifically implying that "men are pigs". Some have even thought Tuomola was a woman. It has been noticed that many medical inside jokes appear in the strips – many of them originate from an old friend of Juba, whose profession happens to be a doctor.

== Albums ==
As of 2013, there have been twelve Viivi & Wagner albums:

1. Sikspäkki ja salmiakkia ("A six-pack and salmiakki), 1998
  Translated to Swedish as Sexpack och salmiak in 2005
2. Apua, sängyssäni on sika! ("Help, there's a pig in my bed!"), 1999
  Translated to Swedish as Hjälp, jag har en gris i sängen! in 2005
3. Ei banaaninkuoria paperikoriin! ("No banana peels in the paper bin!"), 2000
4. Oi, mikä karju! ("Oh, what a hog!"), 2001
5. Kuumaa hiekkaa ("Hot sand"), 2002
6. Viriili vesipeto ("The virile water beast"), 2003
7. Sohvaperunoiden kuningas ("The king of the couch potatoes"), 2004
8. Ranskalainen liukumäki ("The French slide"), 2005
9. Kaasua sohvalla ("Gas on the couch"), 2006
10. Sian morsian? ("Bride of a pig?"), 2007
11. Terassilla tarkenee ("The terrace is warm enough", 2008)
12. Kuinka kasvissyöjä kesytetään ("Taming of the vegetarian", 2009)
13. Sika pussaa! ("Pig kissing", 2010)
14. Vieläkin yhdessä ("Still together", 2011)
15. Vau, kuuma kinkku! ("Wow, hot ham", 2012)
16. Sian puolella sänkyä! ("On the pig's side of the bed", 2013)
17. Kyljys kainalossa ("Cutlet in the armpit", 2014)
18. Sian salarakas ("The Pig's secret lover", 2015)
19. Sikamainen selfie ("The Hoggish selfie", 2016)
20. On-nöff-suhde ("On-oink-relationship", 2017)
21. Maasian munatoti ("Aardvark's eggnog", 2018)
22. Kuumia aaltoja, kylmää kaljaa ("Hot waves, cold beer", 2019)
23. Seksiä, saippuaa ja sianhoitoa ("Sex, soap, and pig husbandry", 2020)
24. Parisuhdekriisisuklaa ("Relationship-crisis-chocolate", 2021)
25. Rakkautta, röh! ("Love, oink! ", 2022)
26. Mäyräkoira puistoon ("Dachshund to the park", 2023)
27. Rakas possumunkki ("Dear doughnut" (possumunkki, lit. 'pig doughnut'; a jam doughnut), 2024)
28. Hapanimelä possu ("Sweet & sour pig (pork)", 2025)
