= Irish comics =

Comics originating in Ireland

- Publishers: Atomic Diner; Clamnuts Comix; Cló Mhaigh Eo; Clover Comics; Coimicí Gael; Longstone Comics; The O'Brien Press
- Publications: At War with the Empire: Ireland's Fight For Independence; Celtic Warrior: The Legend of Cú Chulainn
- Creators: Philip Barrett; Paul J. Bolger; Garth Ennis; P. J. Holden
- Series: Hound; Small Axe; Yellow Press; Ximoc
- Languages: Irish; English

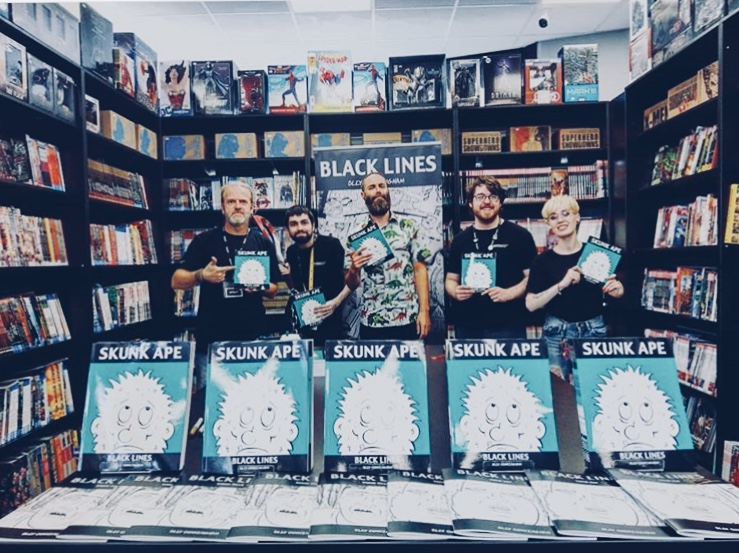
2018 launch of Skunk Ape, an Irish comic set in Dublin published by Black Lines.

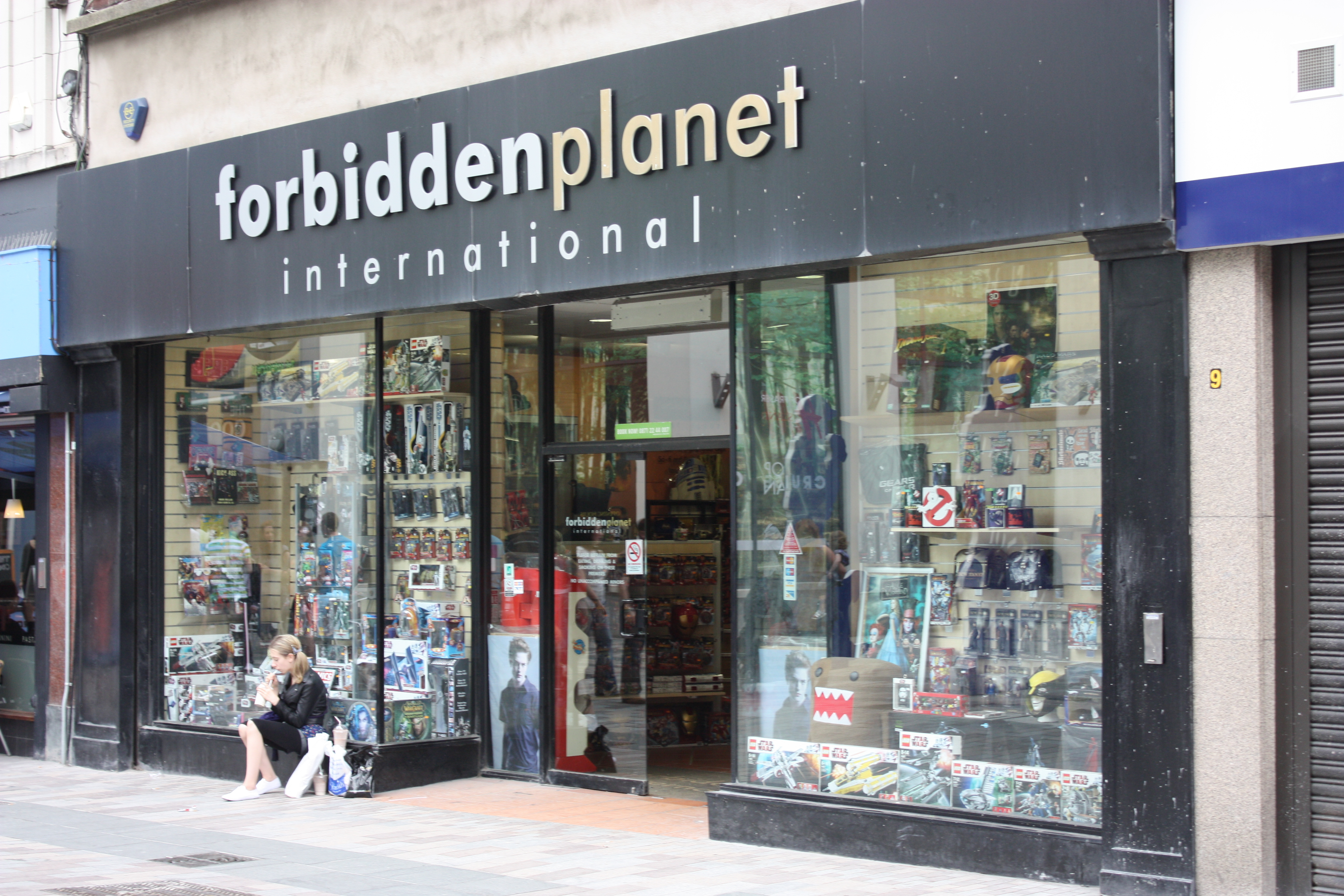
Forbidden Planet in Belfast

An Irish comic (Irish: greannán) is a periodical published in Ireland that contains comic strips. Ireland's comic book market has historically been very small, and closely linked to the British market. In recent years, many comics have been released with themes drawn from Irish mythology and history. The Irish comic industry has its roots in Irish nationalism and Irish Catholicism. Most comics are in English, but some in the Irish language have also been produced. Authors have often portrayed Cú Chulainn and the like as superheroes, and made explicit connection between them and Irish revolutionaries.

Several Irish artists and writers have produced comic books for British publishers, most notably P. J. Holden, Malachy Coney, Jim Fitzpatrick, Will Sliney, Will Simpson and Davy Francis.

== History ==
The Congregation of Christian Brothers published Our Boys between 1914 and 1990, a version of Boys' Own informed by Irish nationalism and Catholicism. From 1937 to 1979 it included Tír na nÓg ("Land of the Young"), an Irish-language insert.

An early example of Irish comics was Nuada of the Silver Arm, a telling of the legend of Nuada Airgetlám by Jim Fitzpatrick that was serialised in the Sunday Independent in 1974–75; it was criticised for its violence and nudity by conservative Irish readers.

Sláine, an Irish hero created by Pat Mills, first appeared in 1983 in 2000AD.

Colmán Ó Raghallaigh was the first person to produce and publish a graphic novel in Ireland, through his own publishing house, Cló Mhaigh Eo ("Mayo Press"): An Sclábhaí ("The Slave") told the early life of Saint Patrick.

== See also ==
- List of comic creators in Ireland
- British comics
