= Ilias Kyriazis =

Comic creator

Ilias Kyriazis (Greek: Ηλίας Κυριαζής; born 1978 in Athens, Greece) is a comic book writer and artist. He is widely known in Greece for his comic series Blood Opera and Manifesto (both of which published in the Greek comic magazine 9 of Eleftherotypia). and since 2008 he's been working for American publishers, mainly IDW and DC's Zuda.

== Career ==
Ilias Kyriazis has been drawing comics since a young age and in 2001 he won the 1st award of the new artists category in the 1st panhellenic comics contest of 9. The same year, he started collaborating with the magazine, illustrating the series Se Vlepo.

The Blood Opera series was concluded in three consecutive issues (# 134- 136), and was published, along with drafts, in 2004 from Syllogi Ennea (9 Collection) of the newspaper. Manifesto was published in a collected form in 2005 by the same publishers, while continuing as a series in 9 to this day. Earlier, he had created the Blockbuster comic series, while now he also keeps a one-page strip called Ena Tsigaro Chronos (One Cigarette's Time) with Tassos Papaioannou.

He often collaborates with the latter outside the context of 9, through Papaioannou's giganto books, which has published the comics Tourta (Cake), in 2006, by the two together, as well as Blast Comics, being an anthology with work of comic artists from Greece, America and Turkey, and rumored to be a project conceived and organized by Kyriazes himself.

In late 2005, he published issue #0 of Gin 747 (self-published) containing comics in the English language, with Vasilis Lolos and Vasilis Bibas.

In April 2008, his webcomic, Melody, was added to the Zuda comics lineup.
