= Supa Strikas =

Football themed comic

Supa Strikas Super Strikas (Latin America)
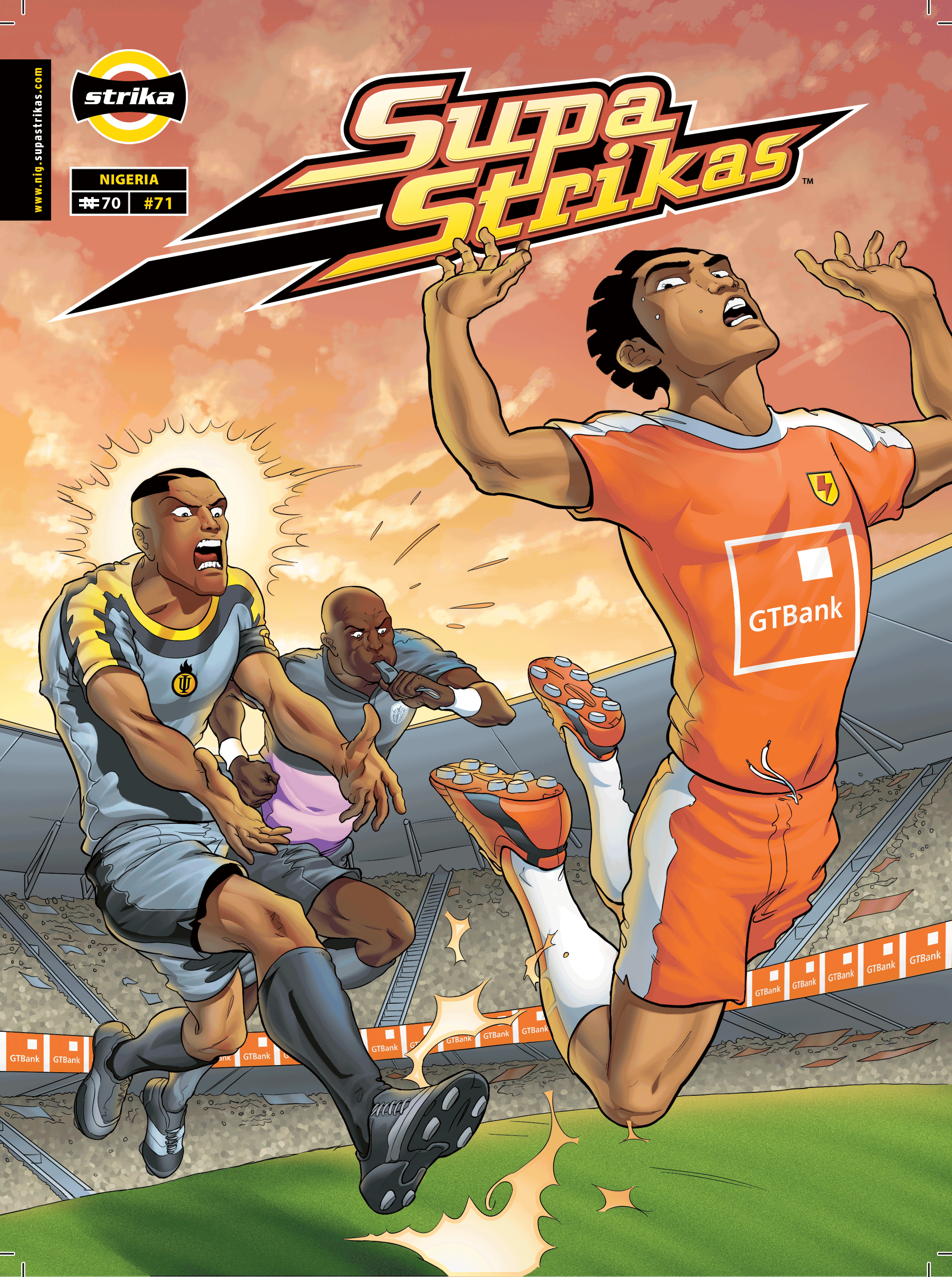
- Country: South Africa
- Language: English, French, Spanish, Chinese (Traditional), Vietnamese, Khmer, Thai, Malay, Tagalog, Arabic, Hebrew, Tamil, Telugu, Hindi, Urdu and Kiswahili
- Genre: football-themed comic
- Published: 2001-2020

Supa Strikas is a South African association football-themed comic about a titular football team dubbed "the world's greatest" who must adapt to various unique oppositions. The Supa Strikas comic prints 1.4 million copies per month in 16 countries. Supa Strikas also appeared on Caltex and Texaco as an ad. The franchise was acquired by Moonbug Entertainment in 2019 and later sold to Disney India in 2020.

The comic's global headline sponsor is Chevron, (the Caltex and Texaco brands appear on Supa Strikas' match and training apparel), with other headline sponsors including Visa, Guaranty Trust Bank and Henkel. Partner sponsors also feature depending on region, including Grassroot Soccer, Metropolitan Life, Spur Steak Ranches, Visa, South African National Roads Agency, and MTN amongst others.

Sponsors exposure includes perimeter boards in-game scenes, product placement / engagement (e.g. the team often eats at KFC in the South African edition), and full-page advertisements. It is currently sponsored by KFC and Old Mutual in South Africa.

== History and development ==
Supa Strikas was founded in South Africa by Andrew Smith, Oliver Power, Lee Hartman, and Alex Kramer Afterward publication spread to various sub-Saharan African countries. By 2002 publications in the neighbouring countries of Namibia, Botswana, Zambia. Nigeria, Kenya, Tanzania and Uganda soon followed.

The comic receives sponsorship from several companies, including Nike, Caltex, and other South African businesses. Consequently, the sponsoring firms have their product names placed on various panels.

The series was based on the life of Thuthuka "Terry" Zwane, a boy from the Soweto area of Johannesburg. With demand for the comic growing increasingly global, Supa Strikas’ core characters remained local, but a more international cast grew around them, including characters of Asian, Latin American and European extraction.

The periodic comic was available across Africa (South Africa, Namibia, Botswana, Zambia, Kenya, Uganda, Tanzania, Mauritius, Réunion, Nigeria, Ghana, Cameroon and Egypt); Latin America (Colombia, El Salvador, Panama, Brazil, Honduras, and Guatemala); Europe (Norway, Sweden and Finland) and Asia (Malaysia and the Philippines).

The comic has also been adapted into an animated series by Animasia Studios. The series debuted in 2009 with 47 episodes – each with approximately 22 minutes of run-time – and aired in selected regions until 2010.

The soccer team attempts to win the Super League trophy, dubbed in their stadium "Strikaland." On their way across the globe, the team explores the roots of soccer, meets its past and present players, and confronts coaches and players from their rival teams.

The story centers around the team's young striker, Shakes, whom many believe is the best striker in the world. Shakes and his teammates, however, consider the acclaim as a mere beginning. The game's global legacy and the players who dream of being crowned Super League champions mean Shakes must constantly challenge himself to remain in contention. As a result, he often finds himself spearheading the team's exploration of the unknown – be it a strange land, a strange opposition, or a new soccer challenge.

The stories in Supa Strikas combine humor (often in the form of the characters like Spenza and El Matador as the comic relief), action, technology, and exploration in the context of a real soccer challenge. In addition, the stories are usually positive life messages that deal with self-actualization, fair play, teamwork, and respect.

== Squad ==
| No. | Player | Position |
|---|---|---|
| 1 | (United States) Big Bo (VC) | Goalkeeper |
| 2 | (Germany) Klaus | Forward |
| 3 | (England) Rizo | Defender |
| 4 | (United States) Eagle Eye | Defender |
| 6 | (England) Griz | Defender |
| 7 | (Brazil) Cool Joe | Winger |
| 8 | (Australia) North Shaw | Defender |
| 9 | (Jamaica) Dancing Rasta (C) | Midfielder |
| 10 | (South Africa) Shakes Mokena | Forward |
| 13 | (England) Noah Murdoch | Goalkeeper |
| 14 | (Brazil) Aldo | Midfielder |
| 16 | (Japan) Twisting Tiger | Winger |
| 20 | (Spain) El Matador | Forward |
| 23 | (England) Lankey | Forward |
| 55 | Blok | Defender |

== Characters ==
=== Shakes ===
Shakes Mokena is a Supa Strikas striker who is from South Africa, he wears a number 10 jersey, which he inherited from his father, Jomo, who was one of the greatest players during his time, though he is seen wearing a number 19 jersey in "Rookie Season". He is the main character of the series, and is especially well known for his "bicycle kick", which he was taught by his dad when he was a child. His other well known skills are "Scorpion Kick" and "Knuckle Ball". Shakes has light brown skin and spiky black hair. He can be quite humorous at times, and loves soccer with all his heart. When things go wrong or something unusual happens, he usually figures out what is going on, but most of the time he is not believed until the end. In Rookie Season, we see that he was 16 years old then, and has a mom and younger sister. His best friend is Spenza, a childhood friend and a Superfan of Supa Strikas. Skarra, a now striker for Invincible United, was also his best friend, but ironically is now his sworn enemy. Shakes is considered one of the best players in the Super League, along with El Matador and Twisting Tiger. Shakes is one of the many talented football players in the Super League and is a quick learner. He can think out a game strategy as well as solve puzzling mysteries. Despite being caught and put through disasters from his rivals, he still manages to win games. He is a peak performer.

=== El Matador ===
Carlos El Matador, nicknamed "El Matador", is a striker for Supa Strikas from Spain who wears the number 20 jersey. He was the most expensive player in the Super League prior to the Amal 3, getting signed for Sultans FC. He tends to be melodramatic, and he is often seen wearing aqua sunglasses. He is also known as 'Fighter'. El Matador is incredibly self-absorbed, being the wealthiest player on the team. El Matador's net worth is an estimated $144 million, with 25% coming from his salary and the rest from his many endorsements. He owns two gold Lamborghini Gallardo LP 560–4, one Coupe and one Spyder, both nicknamed "Bruno." His other cars include a purple Lamborghini roadster with red chrome, a black and silver two-tone Rolls-Royce Ghost, a silver Nissan GT-R NISMO, a bright green McLaren 570S, a blue Cadillac Coupe de Ville, and a red Aston Martin One-77. He likes to live a lavish lifestyle. El Matador is regarded as one of the best players in the Super League and is one of the highest-scoring players. He uses his head efficiently. He is well known for his striking abilities as well as his volatile personality and showmanship on the field. El Matador loves the limelight a little too much, sometimes forgetting that soccer is a team sport. His dream is to have a statue at Strikaland.

=== Automatic ===
Automatic was a midfielder of the team accompanying Dancing Rasta with jersey number 24. He is bald, has a beard and wears a white headband. He betrayed Supa Strikas by joining their arch rivals, Invincible United, after getting replaced by Shakes. He is worse than Shakes. He was so bad it resulted in the Strikas holding trials for a new player. He is known for his amazing throw and great defending technique. Automatic has got a wife named Sarah and two children called Benji and Marcus. Benji recently joined the Invincible United Under-13 squad, which made Automatic a proud father.

=== Klaus ===
Klaus von Klinkerhoffen, known as Klaus, is a player from Germany who wears the number 2 jersey. He has long messy, blonde hair. In some episodes, he was seen playing as a defender and midfielder. Though he isn't very well-built, he is the Supa Strikas' spare striker. Nicknamed the "Supa Sub", he will automatically replace lead strikers Shakes or El Matador on the field if either one is unavailable, injured, or too tired to play. He has blonde hair and green eyes and pale skin. He is quite tall compared to most of his teammates. Klaus has excellent passing techniques and terrorizes tired opposition defense as a super substitute. He puts on a vulnerable and comical facade to lower the opponents' expectations of his playing, yet he is dead serious when scoring goals. Klaus tends to sneeze when nervous. His favorite food is strudel. Klaus always buys his Aunt Hilda presents from every city Supa Strikas visits. He is addicted to the Inspector Von Spector series and believes that the butler is always guilty. He is also selfish sometimes and gets angry for small things. He is the third Striker of the team. Klaus can be easily distracted, and quickly succumb to pressure. He is seen behaving childish and in a child type-like manner. He also sucks his thumb time and again, has a carefree spirit, and a weird sense of humor. Thus, he is rather awkward to be with.

Regardless of his strange personality, Klaus is actually naturally talented. Sadly, his talents go to waste because of his extreme nervousness, instability of mind, and insecurity of not measuring up to his teammates', Coach's, and fans' standards. He may lock himself in the shower room if ever he grows too nervous before a match. Apart from these he also owns a BMW Isetta as shown in the "Rookie Season".

=== Dancing Rasta ===
Fabian Skhosana, also known as "Dancing Rasta", is the 39-year-old captain of Supa Strikas from Jamaica. His surname Skhosana means "innocent soul" which ties with the spiritual aspects of his character. He is a seasoned mountaineer and stands tall at 1.94m. He has dark eyes and wears a rasta band in his hand. He sports a goatee and ponytail. Fabian wears the number 9 jersey and is highly respected for his captaincy skills, especially when facing tough opponents like Dooma of Invincible United or Johann Uber of Iron Tank FC. He is a very polite and motivational leader who does not harm others without a valid reason. Most fans regard him as the greatest captain in the Super League. The other teammates also refer to him as "Captain". Despite his fear of clowns, also known as coulrophobia, he still takes his children to the circus. He has an animated personality and often ends his sentences by addressing others as "mon". For instance, instead of calling Shakes by his name, he calls him "Shakes-mon", which is similar to the genie in Aladdin. He has great defence techniques.

=== Big Bo ===
Bojack "Big Bo" Anderson is a 36 year old character from America who is the main goalkeeper and vice-captain of Supa Strikas. Big Bo wears the number 1 jersey. He is often claimed as the greatest goalkeeper in the league, even better than De Los Santos. He is from Liddleton, Texas, and Supa Strikas is his 3rd team. He has won many awards as a goalkeeper. Before joining Supa Strikas, Big Bo accidentally injured the former Grimm FC player Spike "Awesome" Dawson out of his soccer career. Dawson refuses to accept Big Bo's apology and is obsessed with getting his revenge on Big Bo. He stands at 2.01 m. He is regarded as one of the greatest goalkeepers in the Super League.

=== Twisting Tiger ===
"Takeshi" nicknamed Twisting Tiger is a right-footed winger and midfielder from Japan who wears the number 16 jersey. He previously played for Nakama FC. He is known for his accurate shooting and is one of the best players in Supa Strikas, with his maximum speed going as high as 30 miles per hour. Twisting Tornado and the upside-down Twisting Tornado are his signature moves. Twisting Tiger learned Japanese football style from his former coach Ura Giri. His former teammate, Miko Chen of Nakama FC, is his best friend and brother figure. Tiger is known to be the quickest player on the field and zooms past other players with ease. He believes that his lucky charm helps Supa Strikas in their matches. During his time in Nakama FC, he had injured his arm, while his best friend Miko-Chen broke his leg. When in recovery, Twisting Tiger used to "twist" and "spin" during training and matches to avoid re-injuring his arm, which had earned his name "Twisting Tiger". Now he is seen wearing bandages on both arms from his old injury.

=== Cool Joe ===
José "Cool Joe" Garcia is a Brazilian left-wing midfielder who wears the number 7 jersey. Known as the "king of crossing" following his excellent crosses, also known for his spins, which helped the team to score many goals. He also has a flair for disco music, crediting one record for giving his "groove" during the game. Cool Joe also owns a disco club known as Cool Joe's. He has five signature spins: "The left spin, the right spin, the backspin, and the topspin" that are unpredictable in the field. The fifth spin, the corkscrew, is very different from the rest as it was developed by a table tennis champion, Chill John. He is a keen observer. He also trusts Twisting Tiger, which is shown when Cool Joe shows Twisting Tiger his secret room of vinyls of different music that he hasn't shown anyone else, and tells Tiger to keep it a secret. Cool Joe has a keen preference for the 90s technologies and music, and expresses annoyance when told to pursue more modern technology. Though at the end, he is shown to use a mobile phone, he sticks to his older tech in other aspects.

=== North Shaw ===
Nathan "North" Shaw is an Australian player who is a first-choice defender alongside Blok and Eagle Eye. He wears the number 8 jersey. His personality is described as a surfer who owns a beach shop and rides 'gnarly' waves. North Shaw has deeply tanned skin, and he sports a blonde afro hairstyle and eyebrows. His signature move is 'The Slide,' sliding to retrieve the ball from the opposition's feet. He is enemies with Liquido of Hydra FC.

=== Blok ===
Miroslav "Blok" Rybar is North Shaw's defensive partner who wears the 55 jersey. He is from the fictional country of Brislovia, named after Bratislava and Slovakia. He is nicknamed "Blok," following his ability to "block" the ball very well. He is rather quiet, which is in stark contrast with his rather talkative teammates. However, most people cannot understand him when he speaks because he communicates almost exclusively in Brislovian, though he understands English. Blok's brother, Josef "Attak" Rybar, plays as a striker for FC Technicali. Despite the envy Attak felt from Blok getting into Supa Strikas, Blok never held a grudge against his brother, rather, a hesitance when facing his brother who plays for Technicali. Toward the end, they are shown to have a repaired sibling relationship.

=== Eagle Eye ===
Eagle Eye is a main defender of Supa Strikas and wears the number 4 jersey. He is called Eagle Eye for he has sharp eyes that allow him to intercept the strikers from scoring. Eagle Eye is a native American from Las Vegas and used to play for FC Cosmos. He is close with the other young defenders, North Shaw and Blok. He has a high ability to score long-range goals. Eagle Eye is the oldest player in Supa Strikas. He can take the ball back at any situation and give it to the desired player.

=== Lankey ===
Lankey is a substitute striker for El Matador, hailing from England, however he is seen subbing for Twisting Tiger as well. He is very tall, standing at a whopping 6'9, beanpole-esque, and like his name implies, lanky. His features of highlight are his light blond hair, baby blue eyes, pale skin and buckteeth. He wears the number 23 jersey. He is a bit nervous when he gets the ball but always tries to do his best as a striker.

=== Griz ===
Griz is a substitute defender for North Shaw and wears the number 6 jersey. He has a tendency to vomit out of fear or nervousness about intense matches. He has orange hair and sometimes wears a headband. He is still a capable defender.

=== Rizo ===
Rizo is a midfielder alongside Dancing Rasta. Despite not being animated much, he is part of the starting lineup as traditionally hinted by the single-digit number on his jersey: number 3. This rule varies if main players wish for two-digit numbers. He is not like other substitutes, because he is very serious in his game, despite his (almost) consistent side-smirk.

=== Aldo ===
Aldo was another player in Supa Strikas with jersey number 14. He is a spare midfielder who is also capable of playing but is not good at shooting or defending, leading to him not seeing the field.

=== Noah Murdoch ===
Noah is the substitute goalkeeper for Big Bo with jersey number 13. He is a keeper but he is usually injured by the opposition.

=== Coach ===
David Ledige is the coach of Supa Strikas hailing from South Africa. He is often deemed to be the greatest coach in the Super League. Coach is also considered one of the greatest players of all time, played for Supa Strikas wearing the number 11 jersey during his younger days, and has a reputation for playing in all positions. Coach has been inducted into the Museum of Soccer and two other great players, Edwin and Golare. He is strongly notable for his tactics and his strategies.

=== Spenza ===
Spenza is Shakes's childhood best friend and a superfan of Supa Strikas. As a private investigator, he often helps Supa Strikas solve their problems on the field, particularly on sabotages from rival teams. He is always seen wearing a white hat and a magnifying glass at hand, and he loves to eat. He was a mechanic in earlier days.

=== Supa Fran Francheska ===
Francheska, also known as Supa Fran, is a supporting character in seven episodes who appears to be Spenza's girlfriend. She is a huge fan of El Matador and Dancing Rasta. She appears in the episodes "El Sound of Silencio," "Dooma's Day," "The 12th Man", "Hot Property," "With Fans Like These," "Greetings From Sunny Feratuvia," "The Crunch," and "Game Over." She once rallied fans of Supa Strikas to gather outside the stadiums when they got unfairly banned from a match due to violence.

=== Mac ===
Mac is an Argentinian commentator for soccer games, who formerly played in the Super League as a defender. His personality is being crazy and delusional.

=== Brenda ===
Brenda is Mac's co-commentator from Portugal. Brenda is much more mature than Mac but joins in on the craziness at times. She appears in all the episodes from season 2.

=== Jacques Cousteau ===
Jacques Cousteau is a French chef working for Supa Strikas. He is annoyed at his job with Supa Strikas because he could not show his culinary skills and was forced to cook diet food.

=== Albert ===
Albert is Big Bo's loyal butler. He makes a minor appearance in "Big Bo Lockdown", but in "Big Bo to Go" and "Scare Tactics", he makes a major appearance when he helps the protagonist.

== All comics list ==
| No. | Release date | Title | TV episode |
|---|---|---|---|
| 84 | aug 2009 | Tough Luck | S2E9 |
| 85 | sep 2009 | The Japan Plan | - |
| 86 | oct 2009 | Hocus Bogus | S3E5 |
| 87 | nov 2009 | Shakes Reloaded, pt.1 | - |
| 88 | dec 2009 | Shakes Reloaded, pt.2 | - |
| 89 | jan 2010 | Building Spirit | - |
| 90 | feb 2010 | Sky's the limit | S3E2 |
| 91 | mar 2010 | Big Bo, to go | S2E11 |
| 92 | apr 2010 | Beautiful Gaming | S2E12 |
| 93 | may 2010 | True North | - |
| 94 | jun 2010 | Hipno Test | S2E10 |
| 95 | jul 2010 | Rooftop Shake Up | - |
| 96 | aug 2010 | The Ball of Fortune | - |
| 97 | sep 2010 | Just Desserts | - |
| 98 | oct 2010 | Trapped | - |
| 99 | nov 2010 | Suit Yourself | S3E4 |
| 100 | dec 2010 | Training Trap | S2E2 |
| 101 | jan 2011 | Bouncing Back | - |
| 102 | feb 2011 | Caiving In | - |
| 103 | mar 2011 | Dooma's Day | S3E13 |
| 104 | apr 2011 | Broken Arrow | S7E5 |
| 105 | may 2011 | Greece Lightning | - |
| 106 | jun 2011 | Under Pressure pt.1 | S3E7 |
| 107 | jul 2011 | Under Pressure pt.2 | S3E7 |
| 108 | aug 2011 | Field of Vision | S4E1 |
| 109 | sep 2011 | | - |
| 110 | oct 2011 | Tiger's Tale pt.1 | - |
| 111 | nov 2011 | Tiger's Tale pt.2 | - |
| 112 | dec 2011 | Dribbler on the Roof | S3E10 |
| 113 | jan 2012 | Cool Joe vs the Comet | S5E10 |
| 114 | feb 2012 | Cheese, Lies and Videotapes | S3E11 |
| 115 | mar 2012 | Head in the Sand, pt.1 | S3E8 |
| 116 | apr 2012 | Head in the Sand, pt.2 | S3E8 |
| 117 | may 2012 | Strike Team | S3E1 |
| 118 | jun 2012 | Zoning In | S3E9 |
| 119 | jul 2012 | Own Ghoul | S3E3 |
| 120 | aug 2012 | Dat Boot | S4E2 |
| 121 | sep 2012 | Dry Spell | S7E8 |
| 122 | oct 2012 | Shakes on the Train, pt.1 | S3E12 |
| 123 | nov 2012 | Shakes on the Train, pt.2 | S3E12 |
| 124 | dec 2012 | Live and Kicking | S4E3 |
| 125 | jan 2013 | Chip off the Old Blok | S4E4 |
| 126 | feb 2013 | Scare Tactics | S4E5 |
| 127 | mar 2013 | Klaus Encounters of the Nerd Kind | S4E7 |
| 128 | apr 2013 | Worth His Weight in Goals | S4E11 |
| 129 | may 2013 | Endless Bummer | - |
| 130 | jun 2013 | Cool Aid | S6E12 |
| 131 | jul 2013 | 12th Man | S4E12 |
| 132 | aug 2013 | El Matador Finds Himself | S4E8 |
| 133 | sep 2013 | Total Replay | S5E12 |
| 134 | oct 2013 | Cuju be Loved, pt.1 | S4E5 |
| 135 | nov 2013 | Cuju be Loved, pt.2 | S4E5 |
| 136 | dec 2013 | Spinner Takes All | S4E9 |
| 137 | jan 2014 | Depth Charge | S5E3 |
| 138 | feb 2014 | Man in the Iron Tank Mask | S5E2 |
| 139 | mar 2014 | Home Truth | - |
| 140 | apr 2014 | Stumble in the Jungle | S4E10 |
| 141 | may 2014 | Heels Over Head | S5E5 |
| 142 | jun 2014 | Home Ground Disadvantage | - |
| 143 | jul 2014 | Return to Pirate Tower, pt.1 | S5E13 |
| 144 | aug 2014 | Return to Pirate Tower, pt.2 | S5E13 |
| 145 | sep 2014 | Supa Strikas and the Temple of Zoom | S7E9 |
| 146 | oct 2014 | The Determinator | S5E9 |
| 147 | nov 2014 | Fastest Gloves in the West | S5E13 |
| 148 | dec 2014 | No Man's Island | S5E1 |
| 149 | jan 2015 | Sepak Attack | S6E4 |
| 150 | feb 2015 | Licence to Coach | S5E8 |
| 151 | mar 2015 | Balancing Act | - |
| 152 | apr 2015 | An Icy Grip | S5E6 |
| 153 | may 2015 | Ahead of the Game | S5E7 |
| 154 | jun 2015 | Last Action Figure | S5E4 |
| 155 | jul 2015 | Another Man's Shoes | - |
| 156 | aug 2015 | Bands of Bruthas | - |
| 157 | sep 2015 | Losing Touch | - |
| 158 | oct 2015 | Cheer and Loafing in Las Vegas | S5E11 |
| 159 | nov 2015 | | - |
| 160 | dec 2015 | Pitch Imperfect | S6E6 |
| 161 | jan 2016 | Brislovian Candidate | S6E1 |
| 162 | feb 2016 | Weather or Not | S7E4 |
| 163 | mar 2016 | Total Eclipse of the Half | - |
| 164 | apr 2016 | Hot Property | S6E5 |
| 165 | may 2016 | Living the 'El' Life | S6E3 |
| 166 | jun 2016 | Food for Thought | S7E11 |
| 167 | jul 2016 | Extreme North | - |
| 168 | aug 2016 | Rise of the Tiger | - |
| 169 | sep 2016 | In Spike of Himself | - |
| 170 | oct 2016 | In a Tight Corner | - |
| 171 | nov 2016 | Fever Pitch | S7E1 |
| 172 | dec 2016 | Your Latest Trick | S7E3 |
| 173 | jan 2017 | The Crunch | S6E13 |
| 174 | feb 2017 | Fly Hard | S6E2 |
| 175 | mar 2017 | Blurring the Lines | - |
| 176 | apr 2017 | El Matadouble Trouble | - |
| 177 | may 2017 | Insult to Injury | - |
| 178 | jun 2017 | Broken Record | S6E7 |
| 179 | jul 2017 | | - |
| 180 | aug 2017 | | - |
| 181 | sep 2017 | Greetings from Sunny Feratuvia, pt.1 | S6E10 |
| 182 | oct 2017 | Greetings from Sunny Feratuvia, pt.2 | S6E10 |
| 183 | nov 2017 | Training Daze | S6E11 |
| 184 | dec 2017 | | - |
| 185 | jan 2018 | Asoccerlypse Now | S7E2 |
| 186 | feb 2018 | On Klaus Inspection | S6E9 |

== Teams ==
These are the teams in the Supa Strikas series. Teams include:

=== Invincible United ===
Invincible United are a bad team and are also the main antagonists from South Africa. They are Supa Strikas's biggest rivals. They were the best team, yet also the meanest and most dishonest in the Super League. Their coach is Vince, their lead striker is Skarra and the current captain is Dooma. Skarra and Shakes were once best friends, until they both tried out to join Supa Strikas but only Shakes qualified. Starting from Season 3, Episode 39, and Season 5, Skarra was replaced by Dooma as the team's captain due his pride preventing him from doing actual teamwork. Invincible United players are Dingaan, the team of Snake and their goalkeeper, The Web. Their home stadium is called The Vice, with a capacity of 60,000. The Façade and the general design of The Vice is based upon the Colosseum in Rome.

=== FC Technicali ===
FC Technicali is a team from Los Angeles, United States. Their coach is 'The Inventor' Toni Vern. Their lead striker and the captain is Chuck T Chipperson. John J Johnson Junior is the team's lead midfielder, and Benedict B. Bradley is their goalkeeper. Other known players of the team are Thaddeus Tarrington III, Kyle Kowalski, Rocky George and Blok's Brother Attak. The team uses technology during games and is one of the most notorious cheaters in the Super League, after Invincible United. FC Technicalli's home stadium is Technical Stadium, sometimes referred to as The Hub, and has a capacity of 68,000.

=== Cosmos FC ===
Cosmos FC hails from Las Vegas, United States. Their coach is Buddy Watkins, who owns the Buckingham Palace Hotel in Las Vegas. Their lead players are Ninja, an offensive player, and Bolo, a defensive player. Other team players are the team's captain Emilio, Scissors, Jag, and goalkeeper Keller. Their stadium is The Universe with a capacity of 70,000.

=== Azul FC ===
Azul FC is a team from Mexico and is loosely based from Cruz Azul. Their manager is Honcho Gomez. Their best player and captain is goalkeeper De Los Santos, known for his remarkably huge size and ability to easily save almost every ball. Other players include Tomas, Santiago, Leonardo, Estevez, and Pablo. Their home is called Aztec Stadium, based on Aztec Stadium with a capacity of 55,000.

=== Clube Palmentieri ===
Clube Palmentieri is a team representing Brazil. The team is based on Palmeiras in São Paulo. The team's style of play is The Palma Way (probably inspired by The Samba Style), taught by the team's legend, Edwin, who in later episodes is their coach. They have good accuracy, speed, and balance and are known as the Samba Kings. The lead striker and captain of Palmentieri is Don Aldo (based on great striker Ronaldo de Lima). Other known players are Rick, Cruz, Melo, Felipe, and goalkeeper, Julio (based on Júlio César). Their home stadium is the Ramba Stadium, with a capacity of 100,000.

=== Barka FC ===
Barka FC is a team representing Spain located in Barcelona and is loosely based on FC Barcelona. Their lead striker and the captain is Riano, a fair and honest player, based upon Lionel Messi. Their legendary players are Golare (named after Pep Guardiola) and El Ariete, who is now a header coach. Other known team players are Bolito, Enrique, Jordi, Mendez, Paulo and goalkeeper, El Barerra. Barka's home ground is called Faux Camp (based on Camp Nou), and its capacity is 65,000.

=== Orion FC ===
Orion FC is a French team based in Paris, France. The team's specialty is airborne play. Their coach, Professor Black, is crazy about space observation and exploration. Orion's lead striker is Andre Meda. Other players include Max and Stax Spacek, Ben Schwarma, Niell Sagan, and their goalkeeper, D'etoile Phinus. Their home stadium is called The Soccersphere, with a capacity of 65,000. The basement of The Soccersphere has a zero-gravity chamber, which Shakes stumbles upon.

=== Hydra FC ===
Hydra FC represents France. They are known as the fastest team in the Super League. The team is also noted for using technologies on playing matches, tilting the stadium when needed, which qualifies as cheating. Their coach is Alfredo Del Aqua, and Giorgio Liquido is the team's lead midfielder. The team's captain is Skipper, and its goalkeeper is The Plug. Other known players of the team include Shane Fin, Ripple White, and Joe Mamoa. Hydra's stadium is called the Floating Stadium as it is built on an ocean. The stadium has a capacity of 40,000.

=== Iron Tank FC ===
Iron Tank FC is a team from Germany, and its players are made up of former and active members of the Bundeswehr. Their coach is Colonel Von Pushup, their lead defender and the captain is Johann Uber, their lead striker is Thor, their lead midfielder is Von Eye, and their goalkeeper is The Mangler. Other known players of Iron Tank are Ja Nein a tech-savvy player, who often tricks and hypnotizes his teammates, and Erin, a substitute player. The team is considered the strongest and most formidable that the Super League has ever seen. Their home stadium is called The Fortress Stadium, the 4th biggest stadium after Goliath Stadium, Ramba Stadium, and Strikaland, with a capacity of 75,000. The stadium is located high in the Alps, constantly covered in snow. While playing in The Fortress Stadium, opposition players and match officials wear unique clothing, and a bright red-orange ball is used. The high altitude creates a natural home ground advantage due to opposition players sometimes experiencing nausea and other symptoms of altitude sickness.

=== Colossus FC ===
Colossus FC is the team from Greece. The team's name is reflected in the size of the players, often vast and colossal. Their coach is Nick Kickalopolous (Greek: Νικ Κικκαλοπολους), and Demitrius is the team's central striker. Other players include Bemus, Parseus, Hermes, Achilles, and their goalkeeper, Titan. Their stadium is the Olympic Stadium and the stadium capacity is 65,000.

=== Nakama FC ===
Nakama FC is the team representing Japan. The team is composed of karate and ninjutsu practitioners. Nakama's coach is Ura Giri (Japanese: ウラギリ), who publicly supports discipline and fair play and has even made the motto, "Honor and Trust,"; but in reality, he resorts to dirty play when his team could be defeated. Their lead striker is Miko Chen. Other known players of Nakama are Yugiro, Shinji, Keita, Kylo, Eddy Nakamura, Enzo Honda, Goji Ao, and their goalkeeper, Kendo. Nakama FC is Twisting Tiger's former team. The team's stadium is Ga Shuku Stadium and has a capacity of 70,000.

=== Sultans FC ===
Sultans FC represents the United Arab Emirates. They are the wealthiest team in the Super League. The team's former star players were the Amal 3, Aziz, Akbar and Alam. Upon their signing, the Amal 3 were the most expensive footballers in the Super League. Sultans' lead striker and captain is Zoom Zahir. Other players include Eduardo, Erikson, Duval and their goalkeeper, Fast Farouk. Their coach is Sheikh Ali Zaman (Arabic: علي زمان), a wealthy royal. The team is also known for often tricking people into unfair games and competition. Sultans home stadium is the Goliath Stadium, with a capacity of 150,000, in the middle of the desert. Sultans thrive and play their best in the heat, which gives them home ground advantage over other teams who are less tolerant to the increased temperature.

=== Grimm FC ===
Grimm FC is Romanian team located in Feratuvia. Their coach is Coach Belmont, and the team's lead midfielder and captain is Vladimir Savich from Serbia. Their former player and legend also one of the most popular player who thinks That Big Bo Finished his career is Spike "Awesome" Dawson from the United States. Other known team players are Scully Molder, Bones Jones, Rip Staples, Sloan Wolff and goalkeeper, Franklin Stein. Grimm FC often uses Halloween tricks to scare the oppositions. The team's most prized possession is a book called the Tactanomicon, written by the team's former coaches. Grimm FC's home stadium is called The Cauldron, with a capacity of 40,000.

=== Cognito FC ===
Cognito FC is an English team from Manchester. Their lead striker is Judge Caleb, an English footballer. Other players include Archie Tipp, Rory Shanks, Karl Young, Udi Pass, and their goalkeeper, Pavlov Jashin. Their coach is In-Yo, the only female coach in The Super League. In-Yo has a bitter-sweet past experience with Twisting Tiger and his ex-teammate Miko Chen. Their stadium is The Headquarters, with a capacity of 75,000. They have only appeared in two episodes, 'Hot Property' and 'Mind Over Matador.'

=== Sa Ming United ===
Sa Ming United is a team from China. They only appeared in the first two seasons. They are considered as one of the weaker teams in the league. Their lead striker is Sa Ma Wee (Korean: 사마위) from South Korea.

=== FC Lokomotiv ===
FC Lokomotiv is a team from Russia and is based on FC Lokomotiv Moscow. This team has appeared only once during the match against Azul in 'Communication Blok.' This team is very much unknown and has not faced Supa Strikas in any episodes and it once appeared on the episode when they were coached by "Ndinani Jako" from South Africa.

=== Littleton FC ===
Littleton FC is Big Bo's former team. They only appeared in two episodes, 'Big Bo To Go' and 'Own Ghoul.'

=== FC All Star ===
FC All-Star is an all-star team consisting of lead players from the teams faced by Supa Strikas. The team captain is Skarra. This team only appeared in the final episode of Season 2, 'Bringing Down the House'. It consisted of all the best players of Super League.

There team consisted of 11 players which include:

De Los Santos (GK)(Azul FC) | Ninja (Cosmos FC) | Bolo(Cosmos FC) | Johann Uber (Iron Tank FC) | Miko Chen (Nakama FC) | Don Aldo (Clube Palmentieri) | Giorgio Liquido (Hydra FC) | Andre Meda (Orion FC) | Riano (Barka FC) | Skarra (C)(Invincible United)

== See also ==
- South African comics
