= Kecemprengman =

Malaysian comic book

Kecemprengman is Malaysian comedic superhero comic book series created by Malaysian cartoonist, Jefferi Abdul Rahman, better known as Poyo and published by PTS under its Komik-M brand. To date, the comic book series has two volumes. The series follows a young man named Kerel on his quest to fight against crime using his power to transform into what would be called Kecemprengman.

== Synopsis ==
Professor B is a professor who had modified a young man, Kerel, caused him able to transform into a hero named Kecemprengman, although the method of modification never clearly stated in the series. Kerel use his ability to fights against several antagonists. In the first volume, Kecemprengman fights against Professor A, who is Professor B's twin brother while in the second volume, he fights against Professor Madya Karumalai.

== Influences ==
The series makes use of science fiction elements. The creator, Poyo stated in Kecemprengman volume 2 that he wants to be famous like Akira Toriyama, Yoshito Usui, Eiichiro Oda, and Masashi Kishimoto. The power up of Kecemprengman which first seen in volume 2 was said to be inspired by Kamen Rider series.
