= Book of Pages =

Novel by David Whiteland

- Author: David Whiteland
- Language: English
- Published: 1 July 2000
- Publisher: Pow Books / Ringpull Press
- Publication place: United Kingdom
- Pages: 136
- ISBN: 978-1903376003

Book of Pages is a graphic novel by English author David Whiteland published in 2000. It tells the story of Jiriki, a young monk sent from a mountain monastery to the city of Metropolis to find the mysterious Book of Pages. The culture shock experienced by Jiriki during his journey to and through the high tech megacity is explored in 64 vignettes, with diversions and musings on (among other topics) number theory, and technology and its relationship with humanity.

In 2012, British author Naomi Alderman called Book of Pages "a wonderful meditation on Buddhism and technology".
