= Sam119 =

Publication information
- Publisher: Undercurrent Comics.
- Genre: see below

Creative team
- Written by: Steve Beckett; Simon James
- Artist(s): Steve Beckett; Simon James

SAM119 is a comic book series created by Grimsby-based author and artist duo Steve Beckett and Simon James. It was published as a mini series by the small press publisher Undercurrent Comics. The comic was due to be followed up by a children's comic called 'SAM119 Adventures', which never materialised. Beckett and James put the project on hold when the latter's wife experienced a difficult pregnancy. Latterly the duo have been talking about producing a new comic called Zeke, which follows on from the SAM119 story.

== Overview ==
The comic, which was launched at Bristol Comic convention in 2004, is a cyberpunk style science fiction story, combining elements of action adventure, and quest type storylines.

It is notable for its strong themes of Christian redemption, and sub plot involving the conversion of the main protagonist (SAM119) to Christianity. Artist Beckett and writer James are both active Christians, and their publishing business, undercurrent comics publicizes a number of other Christian comic book offerings, as well as the SAM119 series.

SAM119 is published as a series of four full colour comic books. On its launch, it was seen as unusual because of its high production values, and full colour finish. In the years following, more independently published British comic books began to appear in full colour.

The name SAM119 is a code for Psalm 119 which is revealed as a prophetic message given to the hero as a child.

== Contemporaries ==
Comics which were released around the same time as SAM119 include Malcolm Magic, and Tozzer.

== Reception ==
Reviewer Glenn Carter of Comics Bulletin described SAM119 issue 1 as: "a blend of Cyberpunk, William Gibson, and George Orwell", and there are clear indications of the influence of writers such as Gibson on the work. Artistically it has been compared in style terms to Battle of the Planets.
