= Jerzy Wróblewski =

Polish legal theorist

Jerzy Wróblewski (5 September 1929 in Wilno - 31 May 1990 in Switzerland) was a Polish legal theorist and a professor at the University of Łódź.

== Biography ==
Wróblewski graduated at the Jagiellonian University in 1947 with master's degree in law and completed postgraduate studies in philosophy. After obtaining his Ph.D. in 1949, he moved to the University of Łódź in 1951, where he was appointed head of chair of the theory of state and law. He achieved habilitation in 1970. He remained at Łódź till his death, where he performed a number of functions: pro-dean of the Faculty of Law (1953-1955, and 1958-1962), dean of the Faculty of Law (1955-1956, and 1962-1964), pro-rector (1965-1968), and rector (1981-1984).

He served as a judge of the State Tribunal of the Republic of Poland. He was a member of the Polish Academy of Sciences and the Finnish Society of Sciences and Letters. Wróblewski published in jurisprudence and in the organization of state administration.

== Publications (selected) ==
The following list contains English editions of J. Wróblewski's books and separately published works:

- Between legalism and finalism. Duncker und Humblot, 1984
- Cognition of norms and cognition through norms. Università degli Studi di Trento. Dipartimento di Teoria, Storia e Ricerca Sociale, 1983
- Fuzziness of legal system. Finnish Lawyers' Society, 1983
- Law and philosophy. Springer-Verlag, 1977
- Law-making and hierarchies of values. Duncker & Humblot, 1987
- Legal reasonings in legal interpretation. Centre National Belge de Recherches de Logique, 1969
- Morality of progress : social philosophy of Leo Petrażycki. Franz Steiner Verlag, 1982.
- Presuppositions of legal reasoning. D. Reidel Publishing Company, cop. 1985
- Problems of ontological complexity of law. Universidad del Pais Vasco : Centro de Análisis, Lógiċa e Informática Iuridica, 1986
- State and law in marxist theory of state and law. Wayne State University Law School, 1976
- The rational law-maker : general theory and socialist experience. Edizioni Scientifiche Italiane, 1987

== See also ==
- House of Wróblewski (Lubicz)
