= André Pijet =

Polish-Canadian editorial cartoonist

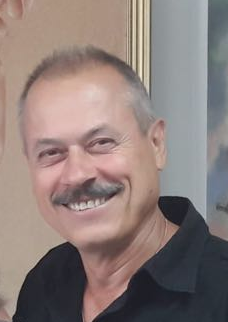
Andre Pijet

Andre Pijet is a Polish-Canadian editorial cartoonist. He is known to have created the series of cartoons related to the 1992-93 hockey playoffs for Montreal daily newspaper La Presse.

== Biography ==
Andre Pijet was born in Poland. In 1988, he moved to Quebec, where he studied art at Concordia University in Montreal. As of 2020, is a teacher at the Université de Montréal.
