= Hombre =

Hombre, the Spanish word for "man", may also refer to:

- Hombre (novel), a 1961 novel by Elmore Leonard
- Hombre (film), a 1967 motion picture based on the novel starring Paul Newman, directed by Martin Ritt
- Hombre (comics), a Spanish comics series by Antonio Segura and José Ortiz
- Hombre (magazine), a magazine for Latino men
- L'Hombre (or, in 17th Century Spanish orthography, Ombre), a card game of Spanish origin
- "Hombre", a 2005 song by M.I.A from her debut album Arular
- Amiga Hombre chipset for Commodore-Amiga computers
- Isuzu Hombre, a pickup truck sold in the U.S. from 1996 to 2000
- "Hombre" (José María Napoleón song) a song written and performed by José María Napoleón, which represented Mexico in the OTI Festival 1977

== See also ==
- Hombres, the plural of Hombre
- Ombre, a seventeenth-century trick-taking card game
- Ombré, the gradual blending of one color hue to another
