= Hombres Con Pañales =

Studio album by K-Narias
- Released: November 15, 2006
- Recorded: 2006
- Genre: Reggaeton
- Label: MultiTrack
- Producer: Master Chris Luny Tunes Noriega Robert Taylor

K-Narias chronology
40 Entre Las 2 (2005)	Hombres Con Pañales (2006)	K-N (2007)

Hombres Con Pañales is the second production of K-Narias.

A CD/DVD, it contains 15 previously unpublished songs, recorded in Puerto Rico, under the production of Master Chris, Luny Tunes, Noriega, DJ Erick and Robert Taylor.

The DVD includes the concert in the Pabellón de Los Majuelos (“The first concert live”), a special one on the visit to the prison TF2, a special news article of K-Narias in one night of celebration with their friends in Tenerife, images of Gara and Loida in New York, Puerto Rico, Los Angeles and other cities of the world; and previous videos, special “making of” and different sessions from photos of the pair.

The album also included three bonus tracks which were remixes of the hit song "No Te Vistas Que No Vas".

== Track listing ==
#	Title	Featured guest(s)	Producer(s)	Length
1	Intro			
2	Mentiroso	Ángel López y Baby Ranks	Luny Tunes	
3	Atiende lo tuyo		Master Chris	
4	No no		Master Chris	
5	Salsa con reggaeton	Pedro Prez	Master Chris	
6	Ya te olvide		Joan y O´Neil	
7	No no (Remix)		Mister G	
8	Como Se Lo Explico (Balada)			
9	Mentira		Mambo Kings	
10	Soy muy differente	Tony Touch	Noriega	
11	Dicen lo que les conviene		Master Chris	
12	Sexo En Tu Mirada (Vamos à la cama)	Don Chezina	DJ Erick	
13	Reggaeton En La Disco		Benito Cabrera/Master Chris	
14	Io io io		O'Neil	
15	No te vistas que no vas (Versión salsa)		Ramón Sánchez	
16	No te vistas que no vas (Versión en portugués)			
17	No te vistas que no vas (Versión original remasterizada)		Master Chris	

== DVD ==
1. Th First Concert Live
2. Especial "Prison TF2"
3. De Marcha Con K-Narias
4. De Viaje Con K-Narias
5. Karaoke
6. Fenomeno K-N
7. Vip Access
8. Making Off "No Te Vistas Que No Vas"
9. Videos :"No Te Vistas Que No Vas" and "Quiero Que Bailen"
