= Gofu (comics) =

South African comics by Deon de Lange

Gofu is a South African comic book, written, drawn and self published in 2013 by Deon de Lange. It is Deon de Lange's first comic book and was launched at the Open Book Comics Fest 2013 in Cape Town. Gofu was also launched at Four Shots, a Durban comic launch, where the author announced that the title would become a limited mini-series publication. It is a short black and white fantasy comic book, rendered in fine detail and beautifully printed in a large, European comics format.

Front cover of Gofu issue 1, 1st edition

Gofu Part two was launched on Free Comic Book Day 2014.

Velocity Graphic Anthology #4, which launched at San Diego Comic-Con in 2014, features Gofu Part 1 in full color. Additionally, Gofu is also one of the South African indy books that was handed out for free at the Velocity panel, "The Pursuit of the Southern Hemisphere comic industry".

== Story ==
A story about a gentle behemoth who must flee extinction with his only friend Tatsu, and seek a new home in an unknown world.

== See also ==
- South African comics
- List of comic books
