= The Lil' Five =

'The Lil' Five'

Publication information
- Publisher: They Did This!
- Schedule: irregular
- Genre: Adventure
- Publication date: 2012
- ISSN: 1034-4640

Creative team
- Created by: Andrew Cramer
- Written by: Michael Crafford, Moray Rhoda, Franz Scholl, Andrew Cramer
- Penciller: Karl Mostert
- Inker(s): Michael Crafford, Ryan Carolisen
- Letterer: Andrew Cramer
- Colorist: Andrew Cramer
- Editor: Moray Rhoda

The Lil' Five is a South African graphic novel/comic series about the Big Five as young kids who get involved in various adventures. A short preview comic was launched at Free Comic Book Day in May 2012 before the first book entitled The Lil' Five and the Secret of the Black Cave was first published in October 2012 and launched at the rAge Expo in Johannesburg.

== Characters ==
A group shot of the Lil Five main characters from left to right: Leo, Rox, Ellie, Kitty and Hoofer

- Leo Proudmane: Confident, proud, intelligent and above all good looking, the suave little lion cub Leo is the coolest cub around. Never showing fear and always the first to leap into a new challenge, Leo often finds himself leading the Lil’ Five on their many adventures!
- Kitty Goodspot: Kitty is the group's level head. She always thinks things through and does the sensible thing. She and Leo often butt heads due to his impulsive nature and her rational thinking. She is also very trendy and always has the lowdown on the latest fashion trends!
- Hoofer T. Hornboggle: Hoofer is the geek of the group. He loves collecting comic books and action figures and watching cartoons. He is a bit of a clutz at times. He is good natured and always prepared to help... even though it may end in disaster!
- Rocko "Rox" Longhorn: Rox is strong and sporty. He is popular at school and has a slight ego problem but this doesn't detract from his loyal friendship to Leo and the rest of the Lil’ Five. He is often the first to follow Leo on whatever crazy adventure they find themselves in.
- Ellie Purehart: Soft-spoken and pure of heart, just as her name implies, Ellie is kind and caring. She may not talk much but she always has something good to say regardless of the situation. Her only weakness is a sweet tooth and the occasional snack.

== Publications ==
=== The Lil' Five Adventure in the Vine Forest ===
A short six-page preview comic in which the Lil' Five help Professor Quillington to escape the dastardly Wild Dog brothers. This was released on Free Comic Book Day in 2012 to raise awareness of the upcoming full-length book.

=== The Lil' Five and the Secret of the Black Cave ===
This first full-length adventure consists of 48 pages. Hoofer finds a treasure map hidden in an old painting and the gang sets off to find the treasure. Little do they know that nefarious forces are also on the trail. This was launched at the rAge Expo in Johannesburg in October 2012 and again in Cape Town on Free Comic Book Day 2013.

=== The Lil' Five and the Journal of Lightning Jack ===
In the second full-length adventure the Lil' Five uncover a hidden journal at Kitty's family's mansion, as well as a shocking secret that turns Kitty's life upside down and leads the gang on another adventure. Hot on the trail of another pirate idol key, the Lil' Five encounter villainous forces standing in their way. This book was launched at Free Comic Book Day 2014

=== The Lil' Five Paw Prints #1: Fright at the Museum ===
The Lil' Five Paw Prints is a series of short stories about 12 pages long each. They Did This have decided to release more Lil Five content this way in between the production processes of the longer graphic novels. The first issue is actually a sequel of sorts to The Lil' Five Adventure in the Vine Forest where we find out just what exactly Professor Quillington had in his bag that the Wild Dog Brothers were after. This book was launched at FanCon 2016

The third graphic novel is in production.

== See also ==
- South African comics
