= Arkas (comics) =

Greek comic artist

Arkas Αρκάς
- Areas: Cartoonist, Artist

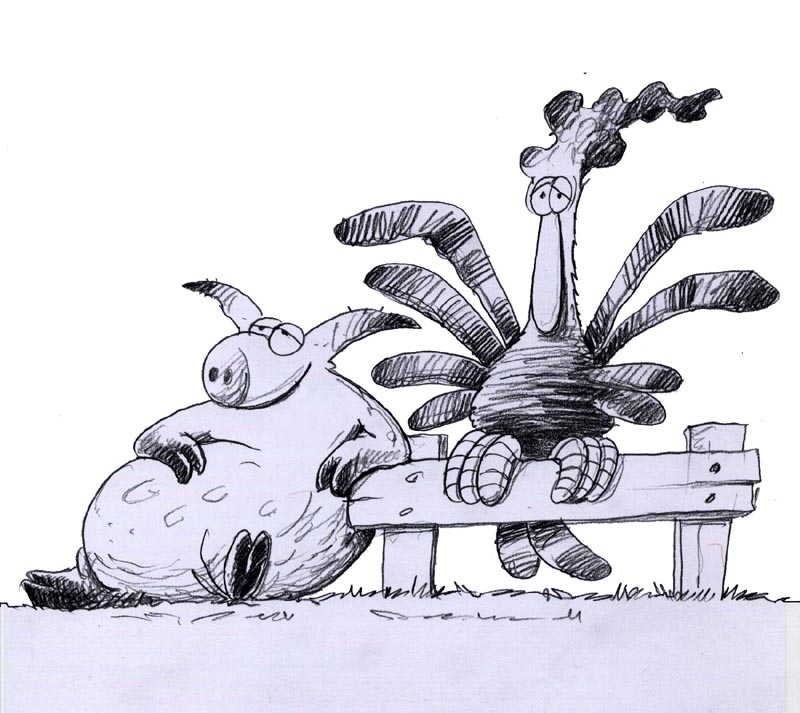
The rooster and the pig. Characters from the "Rooster."

Arkas (Greek: Αρκάς) is the pen name of a popular Greek comics artist that began working in early 1981.

Arkas rarely appears at conventions and generally avoids publicity and appearances on television shows or interviews, as he has been quoted to believe that the artist should be known through his work, not through personal promotion. A mystery has been created around his identity and his real name is still unknown, although the Greek newspaper Kathimerini has also mentioned it as Antonis Evdemon.

== Works ==
=== Comic book titles ===
- O κόκκορας / The rooster – 1981
- Show business – 1983
- Ξυπνάς μέσα μου το ζώο / You bring out the animal in me – 1985
- Μετά την καταστροφή / After the destruction – 1986
- Φάε το κερασάκι / Eat the cherry – 1987
- Ο Παντελής και το λιοντάρι / Pantelis and the lion – 1987
- Αταίριαστοι έρωτες / Ιncongruous love – 1988
- Ο ισοβίτης / The lifer – 1989
- Χαμηλές πτήσεις / Low flights – 1991
- Καστράτο / Castrato – 1995
- Πειραματόζωα / Lab animals – 1998
- Ο καλός λύκος / The big good wolf – 1998
- Η ζωή μετά / The afterlife – 1999
- Οι συνομήλικοι / Peers
- Θηρία ενήμερα / Informed beasts
- Το μικρό και το μεγάλο / The small and the big
- Επικίνδυνα νερά / Dangerous waters

=== CD albums ===
- Ξυπνάς μέσα μου το ζώο / You bring out the animal in me – 1997

=== Theatre plays ===
- Εχθροί Εξ Αίματος / Blood Enemies – 2007
- Βιολογικός Μετανάστης / Biological Immigrant – 2011
