= Georges Bess =

French comic creator

- Born: Georges Bessis; 1947 (age 78–79)
- Areas: artist, writer
- Pseudonyms: Tideli, Nisseman
- Notable works: Le Lama Blanc; Juan Solo; Péma Ling

Georges Bess (born 1947) is a comics artist and comic book creator, best known for his collaborations with Alejandro Jodorowsky.

== Biography ==
Early in his career Bess moved to Sweden in 1970 where he lived for a period, illustrating for publications such as the Swedish Mad magazine sometimes under pseudonyms. During the period 1976 to 1988, Bess productively provided artwork for the serial publication The Phantom distributed by Scandinavian publishers of the popular periodical.

Leela et Krishna (2000) by Layla and Georges Bess.

Upon meeting Alexandro Jodorowsky in 1986, Bess began the Franco-Belgian comics phase of his career, and the two formed a productive partnership. Their collaboration began with the fairy tale-themed Les jumeaux magiques (The Magical Twins) for the Franco-Belgian comics magazine Le Journal de Mickey, published as album by Hachette. Bess and Jodorowsky went on to publish a large body of work for publisher Les Humanoïdes Associés for more than a decade. Initially they produced the Tibetan series Lama Blanc, on a subject that had occupied Bess since earlier travels. Their next collaboration was a revival of the series Anibal Cinq previously drawn by Manuel Moro in the 1960s, featuring an android secret agent. Their final project was the violent outlaw series Juan Solo.

Leaving the creative partnership for the opportunity to pursue his own stories, Bess published Escondida in 1998, taking his work in new directions. In 1999 Bess joined Milo Manara and Claire Wendling to illustrate the second tome of Pierre Louÿs' erotic Aphrodite issued in three volumes.

With his wife Layla Bess he created two albums titled Leela et Krishna in 2000 for publishing house Carabas, portraying ancient India. In 2005, he started the series Pema Ling at publisher Dupuis, revisiting themes of Tibet, most recently the fifth volume Katouk le Tulpa in 2009.

In 2023, it was announced that Magnetic Press had contracted Georges to do the artwork for a new publication of Dracula and Frankenstein.

Bess currently lives in the Balearic Islands.

== Bibliography ==
| Title | Year | Scenarist | Editor |
|---|---|---|---|
| Les jumeaux magiques | 1987 | Alejandro Jodorowsky | Hachette |
Le Lama blanc
| Le premier pas | 1988 | Alejandro Jodorowsky | Les Humanoïdes Associés |
| La seconde vue | 1988 | Alejandro Jodorowsky | Les Humanoïdes Associés |
| Les 3 oreilles | 1989 | Alejandro Jodorowsky | Les Humanoïdes Associés |
| La quatrième voix | 1991 | Alejandro Jodorowsky | Les Humanoïdes Associés |
| Main fermée, main ouverte | 1992 | Alejandro Jodorowsky | Les Humanoïdes Associés |
| Triangle d'eau, triangle de feu | 1993 | Alejandro Jodorowsky | Les Humanoïdes Associés |
Anibal Cinq
| Dix femmes avant de mourir | 1990 | Alejandro Jodorowsky | Les Humanoïdes Associés |
| Chair d'Orchidée pour le Cyborg | 1992 | Alejandro Jodorowsky | Les Humanoïdes Associés |
Juan Solo
| Fils de Flingue | 1995 | Alejandro Jodorowsky | Les Humanoïdes Associés |
| Les Chiens du pouvoir | 1996 | Alejandro Jodorowsky | Les Humanoïdes Associés |
| La Chair et la gale | 1998 | Alejandro Jodorowsky | Les Humanoïdes Associés |
| Saint Salaud | 1999 | Alejandro Jodorowsky | Les Humanoïdes Associés |
| Escondida | 1998 | | Les Humanoïdes Associés |
| Aphrodite, Livre second | 1999 | from Pierre Louÿs | Les Humanoïdes Associés |
Leela et Krishna
| Tome 1 | 2000 | Layla Bess | Carabas |
| Tome 2 | 2000 | Layla Bess | Carabas |
| Bobi | 2004 | | Casterman |
| Chroniques aléatoires | 2005 | | Casterman |
Péma Ling
| De larmes et de sang | 2005 | | Dupuis |
| Les guerriers de l'éveil | 2006 | | Dupuis |
| Yamantaka, seigneur de la mort | 2007 | | Dupuis |
| Naissance d'une légende | 2008 | | Dupuis |
| Katouk le Tulpa | 2009 | | Dupuis |
| Incredible India - Les promenades d'un rêveur solitaire | 2013 | | Vents d'Ouest |

== Sources ==
- Bess dossier of Norwegian Fantomet (in Norwegian), and Swedish Fantomen (in Swedish)
- Georges Bess albums Bedetheque (in French)

Footnotes
