= Gilbert G. Groud =

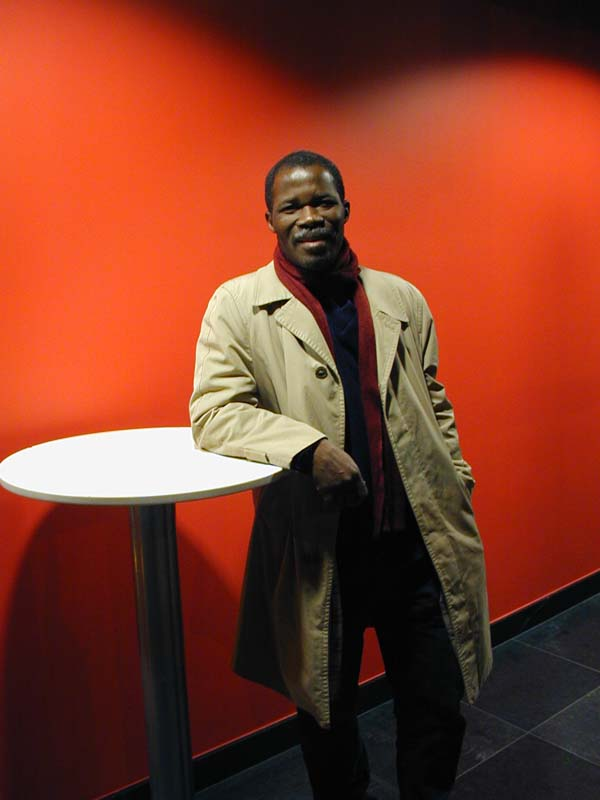
- Gilbert G. Groud October 2006 in Switzerland
- Born: 1956 (age 68–69); Toulépleu, Côte d'Ivoire
- Occupation(s): Painter, illustrator, author

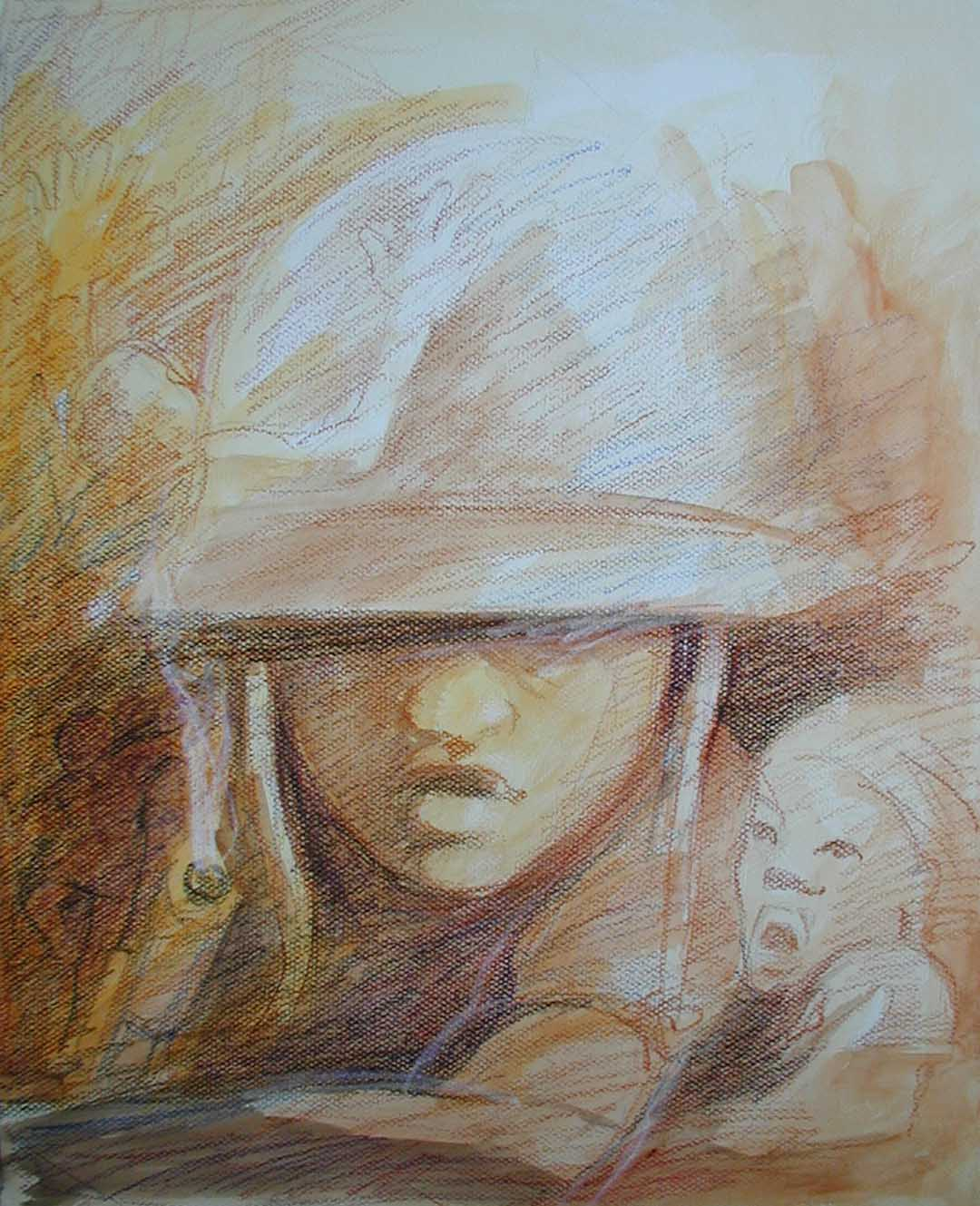
"Childsoldier in the Ivory Coast", Gilbert G. Groud, 2007, mixed materials: tusche and wax crayon

Gilbert G. Groud (born 1956) is a painter, illustrator and author from Toulépleu, Côte d'Ivoire.

== Biography ==
He was born around 1956 in a little village close to Toulépleu in Côte d'Ivoire. He had 23 siblings, not all of whom were born to the same mother since his father was polygamous. 7 siblings were of the same mother.

He attended primary school in his home village. His high school was in the city.

1979 he began his studies of art at the Institut Nationale des Arts in Abidjan. He specialised on communication. His Master's thesis was on the topic of "magie noire" (black magic).

Due to this paper he created the trilogy "Magie Noire", of which the first book was published in 2003 and the second in 2008. The comic book speaks about black magic and marabouts in West-Africa. Because of this and other comic books, the other books were published in small quantities in the Ivory Coast, the Ivorian Ministry of Culture also accepts Groud as an important artist of the 21st century.

Since 2006 Groud has lived as a refugee in Switzerland.

== Civil involvement ==
In his book "Magie Noire" Groud speaks openly against the practise of black magic in Africa. He believes that black magic and other traditions were used to stabilize the current social system. In the modern Africa clinging to the old traditions would have an ill effect on the modern society leading to poverty and wars.

Groud is active against the military use of children in his homeland Ivory Coast and the world in general. He is working on the preparation of several exhibitions and writes a comic book about the topic to increase awareness on the topic. One of the pictures of the exhibition he has released on creative commons license in the hope, it will be also used in fighting the use of children in the war.

The artist rejects the tradition of female genital mutilation, that was and in parts is widely practised among his people, as being harmful and against the human rights. In December 2006 the artist hosted an exhibition and party to raise funds for projects against this tradition, chief among which was an illustrated book aimed at the parents, explaining why this tradition is harmful.

== Bibliography ==
- Groud, Gilbert G. Magie Noire. Albin Michel, 2003 (ISBN 2-226-13642-8)
