= Jussi Tuomola =

Finnish cartoonist

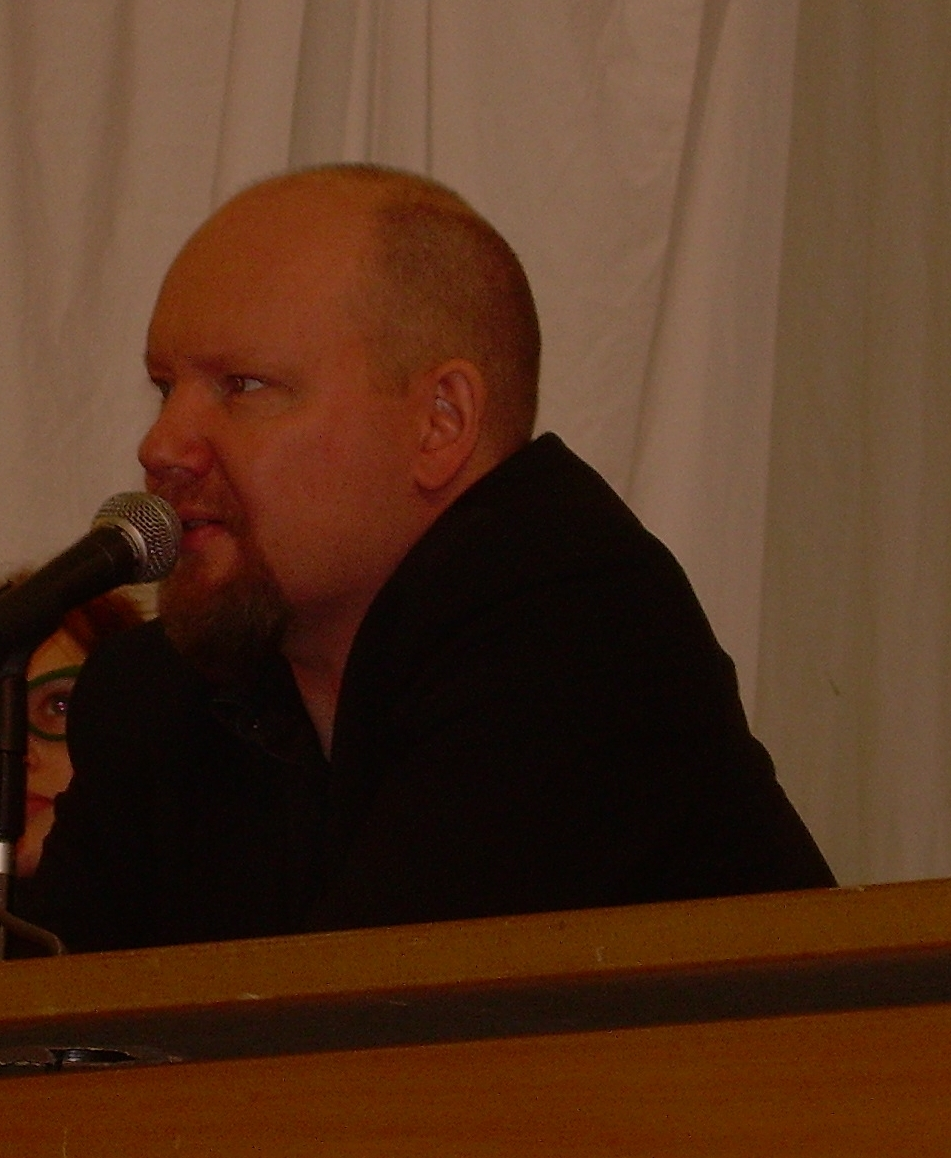
Jussi Tuomola

Jussi Tuomola, pen name Juba (born 8 November 1965 in Lahti) is a Finnish cartoonist.

Tuomola is best known for his ongoing satirical comic strip Viivi & Wagner, about the relationship of a woman and a pig. He has also worked on the Punaniska and Myrkky comics and the Finnish version of MAD Magazine. He has drawn a religious comic book album set in biblical times, called Älä pingota, Paavo! Ota viinirypäleitä... ("Take it easy, Paulie! Have some grapes...")

Tuomola first started drawing at pre-school age in Rovaniemi, copying cover art from Finnish Aku Ankka comics. At the age of six and seven he started trying his hand at comics of his own. His first completed comic was called Tom Taylor, an American-style detective comic inspired by the Tex Willer comics and an American TV detective show called Baretta.

In 1976, Tuomola moved from Rovaniemi to Turku, and in 1982, he went to the U.S. as an exchange student, which inspired him to become a professional cartoonist. His first published comic was Vauhti-Ville, published in a local newspaper from 1983 to 1984.

Tuomola's square-shaped signature "JUBA" was inspired by a similar signature by Jean "Moebius" Giraud.
