= Hombres y Héroes =

- Publisher: Novedades Editores
- First appearance: El Toro

Hombres y Héroes

Publication information
- Publisher: Novedades Editores
- Schedule: Weekly
- Format: Comic book
- Publication date: 1987

Hombres y Héroes was a series of comics whose original series were published every Wednesday in Mexico after 1987. Its themes revolved around historical events or individuals, as well as fictitious or mythological characters. The first of the series lasted from 1987 until 1994 reaching over 400 individual titles. When its publishing house Novedades Editores disappeared, the publishing house that followed it, NIESA, revived the series, republishing some of the previous titles. The new version, however, was smaller and of lower quality than the original. It was also published biweekly, usually on Mondays, rather than weekly as the previous series had been. This new version began in 1998.

== Original series ==
#	Title	Original publication date
1.	El toro	8/26/1987
2.	La guerra santa	9/2/1987
3.	La toma de Guanajuato	9/9/1987
4.	El reino del León	9/16/1987
5.	Combate en camarón	9/23/1987
6.	Cazadores de Cabezas	9/30/1987
7.	La guerra de los Gladiadores	10/7/1987
8.	Amigos hasta la muerte	10/14/1987
9.	Matar o morir	10/21/1987
10.	Los cinco soles	10/28/1987
11.	Josué, la espada de Israel	11/4/1987
12.	Fusiles y guitarras	11/11/1987
13.	As de Ases	11/18/1987
14.	Victoria India	11/25/1987
15.	Roldán de Roncesvalles	12/2/1987
16.	La leyenda de Juan Diego	12/9/1987
17.	La navidad del soldado	12/16/1987
18.	Alejandro Magno	12/23/1987
19.	La batalla de Estalingrado	12/30/1987
20.	Guillermo Tell	1/6/1988
21.	Primero es la patria	1/13/1988
22.	Orellana y el amazonas	1/20/1988
23.	El enigmatico Casanova	1/27/1988
24.	Valdivia el soldado cureña	2/3/1988
25.	La leyenda de Billy the Kid	2/10/1988
26.	San Felipe de Jesús	2/17/1988
27.	El tesoro maldito de los Hapsburgo	2/24/1988
28.	Nezahualcoyotl, el rey poeta	3/2/1988
29.	Los dioses del olimpo	3/9/1988
30.	Misión imposible	3/16/1988
31.	Camino a la libertad	3/23/1988
32.	El Buda	3/30/1988
33.	La malinche	4/6/1988
34.	Buffalo Bill	4/13/1988
35.	El niño artillero	4/20/1988
36.	San Martín de Porres	4/27/1988
37.	La bestia sagrada	5/4/1988
38.	Miguel de Cervantes Saavedra	5/11/1988
39.	La caída de Babilonia	5/18/1988
40.	Yo mate a Rasputín	5/25/1988

== Second series ==
#	Título	Fecha de publicación
1.	La legión de los valientes	10/5/1998
2.	El sitio de Siracusa	10/19/1988
