= Oog & Blik =

Dutch publisher of comics

- Founded: 1985
- Successor: Scratch Books
- Country of origin: Netherlands
- Headquarters location: Amsterdam
- Key people: Joost Swarte; Hansje Joustra
- Publication types: Books, Comic books, Magazines
- Official website: www.oogenblik.nl

Oog & Blik was an Amsterdam-based Dutch publisher of comics founded by Joost Swarte and Hansje Joustra in 1985.

== History ==
Oog & Blik offered books mostly for an adult audience. It published original and translated graphic novels, underground comix, autobiographical comics, picture books, and silkscreens by Joost Swarte. Around 2010 De Bezige Bij bought Oog & Blik. Joustra was fired in 2014 and started a new publishing company called Scratch Books. Almost all comic books artists left Oog & Blik afterwards to join Joustra's new company. Bezige Bij quit publishing comics in 2015 and further activities as Oog & Blik were put on hold.

The story of Oog & Blik was used as a case-study about creating and sustaining artistic independence.

== Creators ==
Oog & Blik books include those by:

- Zeina Abirached
- Stanislas Barthélémy
- Charles Berberian
- Enki Bilal
- Christophe Blain
- Theo van den Boogaard
- François Boucq
- Daniel Clowes
- Robert Crumb
- Def P
- Guy Delisle
- Peter van Dongen
- Guido van Driel
- Philippe Dupuy
- Maaike Hartjes
- Marcel Ruijters
- Mark Hendriks
- Ben Katchor
- Hanco Kolk
- Erik Kriek
- Jacques de Loustal
- Moebius
- Peter Pontiac
- Michel Rabagliati
- Art Spiegelman
- Joost Swarte
- Jacques Tardi
- Lewis Trondheim
- Judith Vanistendael
- Windig & de Jong
- Peter de Wit
- Typex
