= Stephen Cooper =

Stephen Cooper or Steve Cooper is the name of:

- Stephen Cooper (American football) (born 1979), San Diego Chargers linebacker
- Steve Cooper (footballer, born 1955), English footballer
- Steve Cooper (footballer, born 1964) (1964–2004), English footballer
- Steve Cooper (football manager), Welsh football manager and former player
- Stephen Cooper (writer), American academic, biographer and fiction writer
- Stephen Cooper (ice hockey) (born 1966), British ice hockey player
- Stephen Cooper (businessman), CEO of Warner Music Group
- Stephen Cooper (athlete), paralympic athlete from Great Britain
- Disappearance of Steven Cooper (born 1961), a British man who disappeared in 2008
