= Glenn Bray =

American collector (born 1948)

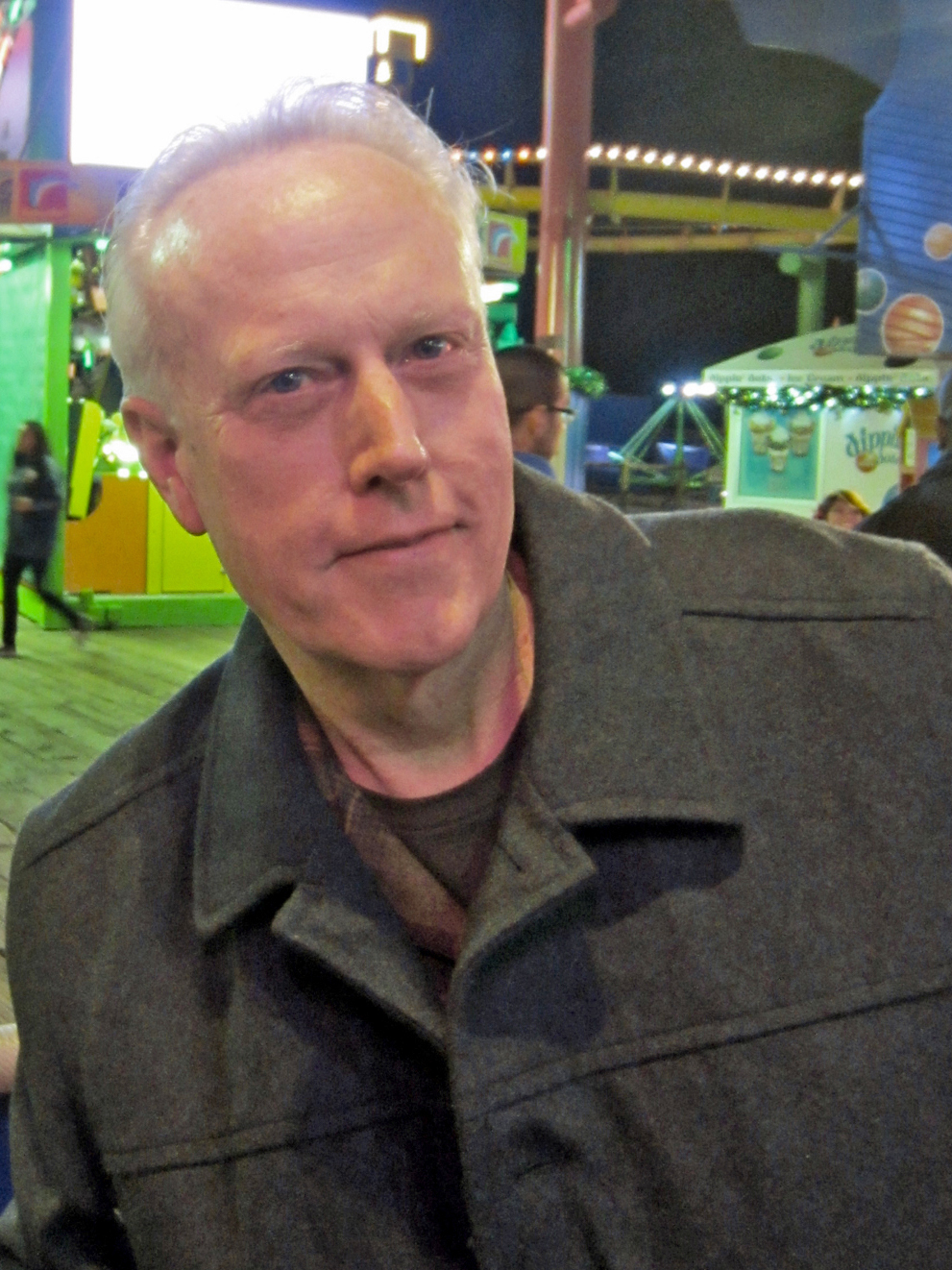
- Born: 1 April 1948 (age 78)
- Occupations: Art collector, editor

Glenn Bray (born 1948) is an American private collector of comic book art and memorabilia, and the editor of multiple books about comic book and modern art, including The Original Art of Basil Wolverton: From the Collection of Glenn Bray (2007) and The Blighted Eye: Original Comic Art from the Glenn Bray Collection. Bray started collecting comics, original art, toys and posters in the 1970s, amassing one of the largest private collections of comic art by Mad magazine artist Basil Wolverton over the following decades. Bray’s comic art collection has thousands of pieces, including art from Mad magazine artist Harvey Kurtzman, George Herriman (known for the Krazy Kat comic strip), Disney cartoonist Carl Barks, and Savage Pencil.

== Early life and education ==
Bray grew up in California's San Fernando Valley. Bray's interest in comic book art started in the 1950s when he was 9 years old, and he saw Basil Wolverton's art in Mad magazine. As a teen, Bray started working in his family’s hardware store and began collecting comics, original art, toys and posters.

== Career and comic art collection ==
Bray purchased his first original piece of art, a drawing by Wolverton, in 1965 at age 17 for $10, and years later he purchased six pages of original art Wolverton made for a story in Mad magazine. Bray's collection of art from Mad is primarily from the comic book editions published under editor Harvey Kurtzman. His collection developed through the 1970s when he purchased original art auctioned by Mad's former publisher, William Gaines. His collection includes original comic art from Mad magazine artists Harvey Kurtzman and Basil Wolverton, underground cartoonists Robert Williams, Robert Crumb, Gary Panter, and Savage Pencil, alternative comic artists Daniel Clowes, George Herriman, and Carl Barks.

In 1971, Bray commissioned the first oil painting from Carl Barks; entitled A Tall Ship and a Star to Steer Her By, the painting featured Donald Duck.

Pieces from Bray’s comic art collection were included in the 2005 “Masters of American Comics” exhibitions at the Los Angeles Hammer Museum and the Museum of Contemporary Art.

Bray and his wife Lena Zwalve also collect art work by Polish modernist painter and sculptor Stanislav Szukalski. Bray collaborated with and published several books with Szukalski. In 2000 Bray, who is also the executor of Szukalski’s estate, helped organize a retrospective of Szukalski’s work called “Struggle: The Art of Stanislav Szukalski,” hosted at the Laguna Art Museum and sponsored by actor Leonardo DiCaprio. The book Struggle: The Art of Szukalski, edited by Bray and Lena Zwalve, was released the same year. Bray’s filmed interviews with Szukalski in the 1980s were included in the 2018 Netflix documentary, Struggle: The Life and Lost Art of Szukalski.

As of 2008, Bray held he largest private collection of art by Wolverton, with over 400 pieces. In 2014, Bray’s comic art collection included “hundreds of thousands of items.”

=== Publications ===
Bray edited and co-edited multiple books about comic art, including The Original Art of Basil Wolverton (2007) and Where Demented Wented: The Art and Comics of Rory Hayes in 2008.

In 2014, Bray co-edited The Blighted Eye: Original Comic Art from the Glenn Bray Collection, featuring art by Harvey Kurtzman, Robert Crumb, Charles Addams, Peter Pontiac, and others.

Bray and comics scholar Frank M. Young co-edited To Laugh That We May Not Weep: The Life and Times of Art Young, published in 2017. The book was nominated for an Eisner Award in 2018.

== Select publications ==
- Struggle: The Art of Szukalski
- The Original Art of Basil Wolverton: From the Collection of Glenn Bray(2007)
- Where Demented Wented: The Art and Comics of Rory Hayes
- Nounours En Enfer
- The Blighted Eye: Original Comic Art from the Glenn Bray Collection
- To Laugh That We May Not Weep: The Life and Times of Art Young
- Behold!!! the Protong: Extracts from the 39 Volumes of My Science "Zermatism," Based on New Interpretations of Petroglyphic Communications, in which Will be Revealed the Most Precedent-shattering and Up-turning of All Notions on Our Origins. Including Samplings from Anthropolitical Motivations, the Deluged Gods, and Listen to These Stones (2019)
- Art Young's Inferno : Original Art Edition(2020)
- Inner Portraits

== Personal life ==
Bray lives in Los Angeles, California with his wife Lena Zwalve, a Dutch cartoonist. He retired and closed his family’s hardware store in 2010.
