= Struggle: The Life and Lost Art of Szukalski =

2018 documentary film

- Directed by: Irek Dobrowolski
- Written by: Stephen Cooper; Irek Dobrowolski
- Starring: Stanisław Szukalski; Glenn Bray; Robert Williams
- Music by: Amotz Plessner
- Distributed by: Netflix
- Release date: December 21, 2018
- Running time: 115 minutes
- Countries: Poland; United States
- Language: English

Struggle: The Life and Lost Art of Szukalski is a 2018 documentary film directed by Irek Dobrowolski, written by Stephen Cooper and Irek Dobrowolski and starring Stanisław Szukalski, Glenn Bray and Robert Williams. The documentary is produced by Leonardo DiCaprio, and his father George DiCaprio. The film was released by Netflix on December 21, 2018.

== Premise ==
The documentary tells the story of the Polish artist Stanisław Szukalski’s troubled life and complicated body of work. He created his own language, and is a self-taught sculptor, who once lost all his work in a Nazi bombing raid. It also focuses on his nationalism and anti-semitic tendencies in the lead-up to World War II, and his subsequent repentance during the second half of his life.

== Reception ==
The documentary was reviewed positively by Karen Han in The New York Times, who stated that it "manages to deliver" on the breadth and depth implied by the title. Han noted: "Still, for Bray, George DiCaprio and others who knew Szukalski in his final years, their struggle with his past is deeply personal. They effectively become subjects themselves, grappling with how he ought to be remembered. The viewer is left to decide."

== Cast ==
- Stanisław Szukalski
- Glenn Bray
- Robert Williams
- Suzanne Williams
- Gabriel Bartalos
- Sandy Decker
- George DiCaprio
- Natalia Fabia
- Jose Ismael Fernandez
- Rebecca Forstadt
- Marek Hapon
- Adam Jones
- James Kagel
- Lechoslaw Lemanski
- Maciej Miezian
