= Stripschapprijs =

Dutch comics award

The Stripschapprijs is a Dutch prize awarded to comic creators for their entire body of work. It is awarded annually by the Stripschap, the Dutch Society of comics fans, since 1974. The prize is non-pecuniary, but is considered the most important award for comics in the country.

== Winners ==
- 1974 – Publisher Skarabee
- 1975 – Maurice Tillieux (Gil Jourdan) and Jijé (Spirou et Fantasio, Jerry Spring)
- 1976 – Hans G. Kresse (Eric de Noorman) and Lo Hartog van Banda
- 1977 – Leny Zwalve and Evert Geradts (Jan Zeiloor, magazine Tante Leny Presenteert)
- 1978 – Martin Lodewijk (Agent 327)
- 1979 – Jaap Vegter
- 1980 – Jan Kruis (Jan, Jans en de Kinderen)
- 1981 – Jean Dulieu (Paulus the woodgnome)
- 1982 – Marten Toonder (Tom Poes, Panda)
- 1983 – Peter van Straaten (Vader & Zoon)
- 1984 – Piet Wijn (Aram van de eilanden, Douwe Dabbert)
- 1986 – Dick Matena (De Argonautjes)
- 1987 – Gerrit de Jager (De Familie Doorzon)
- 1988 – Toon van Driel (FC Knudde, Stamgasten)
- 1989 – Theo van den Boogaard (Sjef van Oekel)
- 1990 – Henk Kuijpers (Franka)
- 1991 – René Windig and Eddie de Jong (Heinz)
- 1992 – Hein de Kort (Dirk & Desiree, Eikels etc.)
- 1993 – Kamagurka (Bert, Cowboy Henk)
- 1994 – Don Lawrence (Storm, Trigië)
- 1995 – Wilbert Plijnaar, Jan van Die and Robert van der Kroft (Sjors en Sjimmie, Claire)
- 1996 – Hanco Kolk (Gilles de Geus, Meccano)
- 1997 – Peter Pontiac
- 1998 – Joost Swarte (Katoen en Pinbal)
- 1999 – Peter de Wit (Gilles de Geus, Sigmund)
- 2000 – Willem
- 2001 – Daan Jippes (Donald Duck)
- 2002 – Eric Schreurs (Joop Klepzeiker)
- 2003 – John Reid, Bastiaan Geleijnse and Jean-Marc van Tol (Fokke & Sukke)
- 2004 – Mark Retera (DirkJan)
- 2005 – Jan Steeman (o.a. Roel Dijkstra and Noortje)
- 2006 – Gerard Leever (o.a. Oktoknopie)
- 2007 – Aloys Oosterwijk (o.a. Willems Wereld and Cor Morelli)
- 2008 – Erik Kriek (Gutsman)
- 2009 – Barbara Stok (Barbaraal)
- 2010 – Jesse van Muylwijck (De Rechter)
- 2011 – Minck Oosterveer
- 2012 – Eric Heuvel
- 2013 – Paul Teng
- 2014 – Fred de Heij
- 2015 – Marcel Ruijters
- 2016 – Maaike Hartjes
- 2017 – Willem Ritstier
- 2018 – Peter van Dongen
- 2019 – Typex
- 2020 – Wasco
- 2021 – Gerben Valkema - (Elsje)
- 2022 – Aimée de Jongh
