= Vegter =

Vegter is a surname. Notable people with the surname include:

- Anne Vegter (born 1958), Dutch poet, playwright, and writer
- Henny Vegter (born 1958), Dutch sailor
- Jaap Vegter (1932–2003), Dutch cartoonist
- Jo Vegter, Dutch architect
