= Minck Oosterveer =

Dutch cartoonist

- Born: 19 July 1961 Dordrecht
- Died: 17 September 2011 (aged 50) Dordrecht
- Notable works: The Unknown (Boom! Studios), Storm - The Exile of Thoem
- Awards: Stripschapprijs.

Minck Oosterveer (19 July 1961 – 17 September 2011) was a Dutch cartoonist.

== Biography ==
Oosterveer was a highly respected cartoonist in the Netherlands and worked on acclaimed series like: Ronson Inc., Zodiak, Nicky Saxx and others.

In 2009 he worked with Mark Waid on The Unknown, a 4-issue limited series published by Boom Studios.

Minck died of a motorcycle accident when driving home on his motorcycle. There were no other vehicles involved in the accident.

== Awards ==
He is the winner of the 2011 Stripschapprijs.

== Bibliography ==
=== European comics ===
- Storm
1. De Banneling van Thoem (Senario: Willem Ritstier)
- Ronson Inc.
1. De afrekening (Senario: Willem Ritstier)
2. Goudeerlijk (Senario: Willem Ritstier)
- Trunk
1. De onbekende soldaat (Senario: Willem Ritstier)
- Red Knight
- Excalibur
- Claudia Brücken
1. De wraak van de Witte Engel (Senario: Willem Ritstier)
2. Een winter in Parijs (Senario: Willem Ritstier)
3. 5 vóór 12 (Senario: Willem Ritstier)
4. "Operatie sneeuw" (Senario: Willem Ritstier)

=== US comics ===
- Zombie Tales

2. Zombie Tales Oblivion
4. Zombie Tales - The Series

- The Unknown

1. The Devil made Flesh
2. The Devil made Flesh
3. The Devil made Flesh
4. The Devil made Flesh
1. The Unknown
2. The Unknown
3. The Unknown
4. The Unknown

- Ruse

3. Ruse

- Spider-Man
1. Spider Island: Deadly Foes
- Maps Of Earth Conspiracies
- Just For Fun

=== Newspaper comics ===
- Nicky Saxx
- Zodiak
- Jack Pott
