= René Windig =

Dutch cartoonist

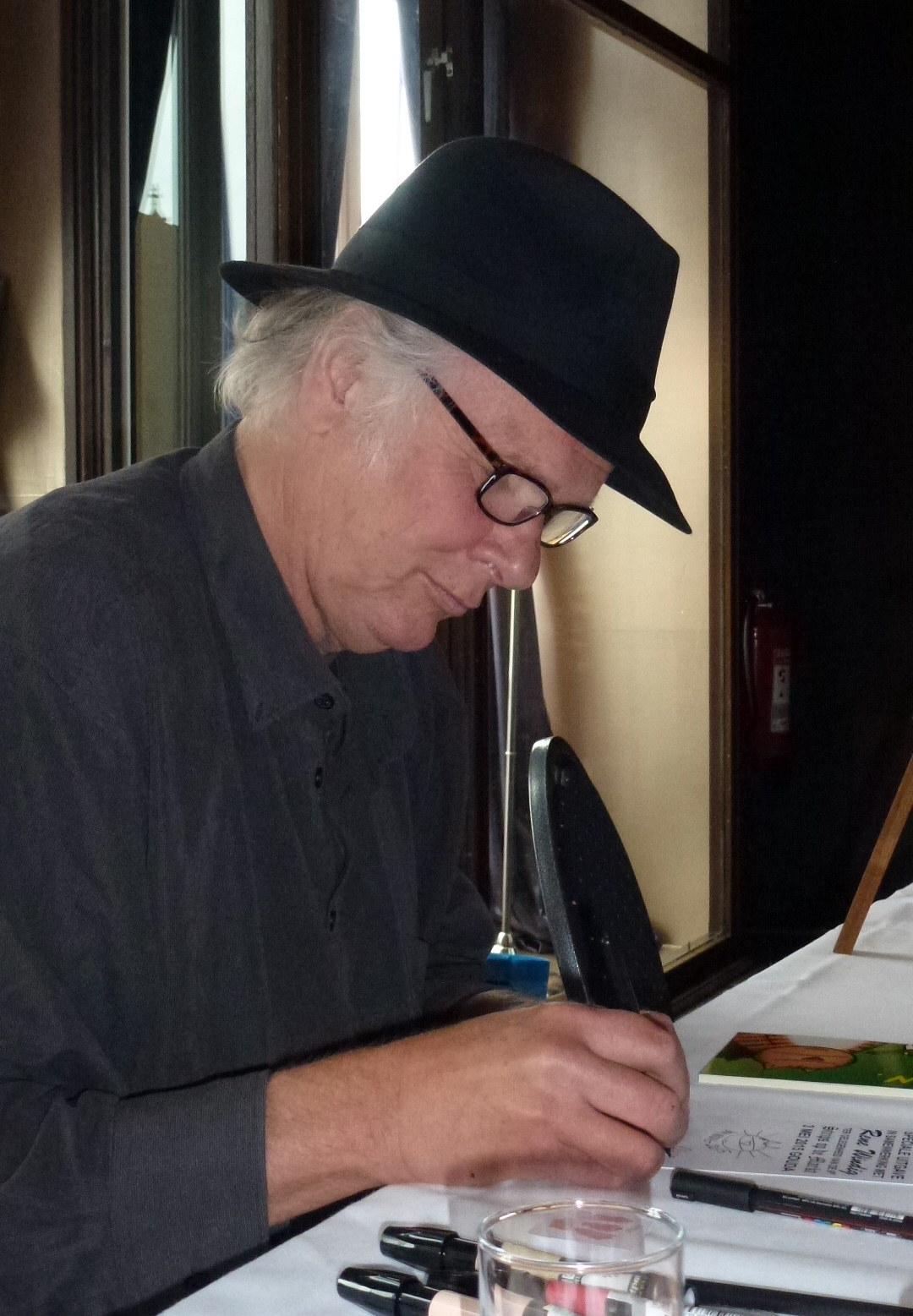
René Windig in 2015

René Windig (born 1951 in Amsterdam) is a Dutch cartoonist, best known as a frequent collaborator with Eddie de Jong. Together they created the newspaper comic Heinz, about a grumpy sarcastic cat. They won the 1991 Stripschapprijs. They created the album covers for records by the rock band Rockin' Belly.
