= Jean Dulieu =

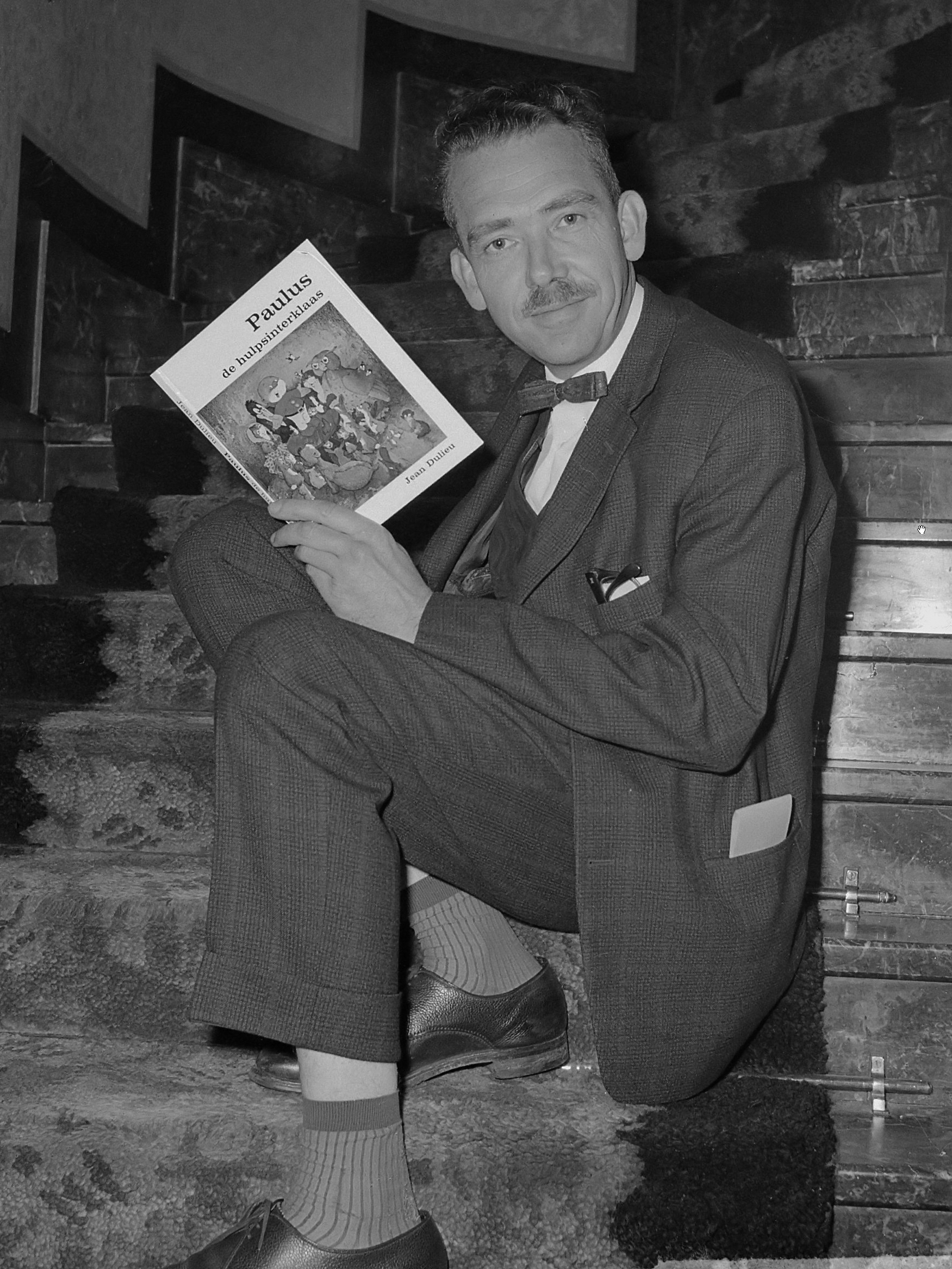
- Jean Dulieu (1962)
- Born: Jan van Oort; 13 April 1921 Amsterdam, Netherlands
- Died: 29 November 2006 (aged 85) Arnhem, Netherlands
- Areas: Writer, cartoonist
- Notable works: Paulus the woodgnome
- Awards: Best Children's book 1962, Edison, Stripschapsprijs

Jan van Oort (13 April 1921 – 29 November 2006) was a Dutch children's book writer and comic strip cartoonist, working under the pseudonym of Jean Dulieu (French pronunciation: [ʒɑ̃ dyljø]). He is known for his creation of Paulus the woodgnome.

== Biography ==
Jan van Oort was born on 13 April 1921 in Amsterdam. He was the son of concert singer Hendrik C. van Oort, and grandson of the political cartoonist Johan Braakensiek. Van Oort was into music, and creative activities, such as drawing and puppet making.

Jan van Oort studied the violin on the conservatorium where he graduated in 1940, and became violinist with the Amsterdam Royal Concertgebouw Orchestra. During the Dutch famine of 1944, the orchestra was decommissioned, allowing Van Oort more time for drawing. While living at the time in Soest, he made twelve designs of gnomes, and let his wife Kitty Sijmons pick the best one. This one he elaborated to a full-blown children's book character and named him Paulus.

Shortly after the war, Van Oort and his family moved to Terschelling, and a year later ended his participation in the orchestra, aiming for a full job in comics strips, although having no education in this field.

In 1984 when he was 63, he finished his cartoonist career. Van Oort died in 2006 in Arnhem, at the age of 85. In September of that year, his daughter Dorinde van Oort published a novel about her family, where her father is named Lepel Mansborg.

== Paulus books ==
Paulus the woodgnome was published from 1946 onward in the daily newspaper Het Vrije Volk. Van Oort used the pseudonym of Jean Dulieu, the literal French translation of Jan van Oort, to protect a possible image loss to his violinist career in case of failure in his cartooning work. In total, Van Oort created approximately 3,600 comic strips for this newspaper.

In 1948, the first illustrated Paulus children's books were published, including Paulus the deputy Sinterklaas and the Paulus winterbook, the latter having even coloured illustrations. During the years more publications followed, including Paulus and Eucalypta, Paulus and the dragon, and Paulus and Skipper Mackarel. In 1964, he published his masterpiece Paulus and the acorn men, with many colour illustrations and the death theme. Various books by Dulieu have been translated to English, German, South-African, Japanese and Swedish.

== Paulus in other media ==
In the period 1955 to 1964, Paulus the woodgnome was broadcast as radio drama. Van Oort did all the voices himself, with the exception of Princess Priegeltje, which was done by his daughter Dorinde van Oort. Starting 1967, Van Oort made 39 puppet movies of 10 minutes each for the Dutch television programme Monitor. He created all puppets, scenery and accessories by himself. These movies were also broadcast in the United Kingdom, New Zealand, Canada and Australia.

In the 1970s, Van Oort started a new series of newspaper comic strips, totalling 23 full stories. In 1984 when he was 63, he finished his last Paulus.

Even in 2008, new Paulus books are still being published, based on so far unpublished material, by De Meulder Publishers.

== Other publications ==
Besides Paulus, Van Oort created for Albert Heijn a book Boffie and Buikie in a tie, an album for which 96 paper strips could be collected from Albert Heijn shop purchases.

Following travels to Italy, Van Oort published in 1953 the book Francesco about Francis of Assisi.

== Awards ==
Van Oorts book Paulus the deputy Sinterklaas was Best Children's Book in 1962, and he received an Edison award for a grammophone record of one of his Paulus stories.

His full career as comic strips cartoonist was awarded the Stripschapsprijs in 1981.

Since 1995, the Paulus Archives are collecting and publishing the life and works of Jean Dulieu and Paulus the woodgnome, notably via the magazine Bouterbode.
