= Evert Geradts =

Dutch cartoonist

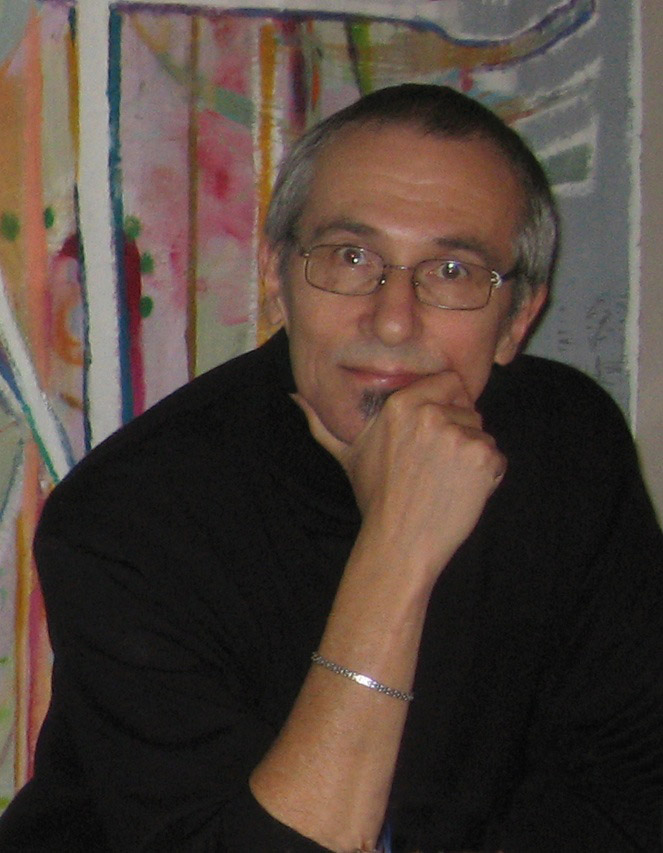
Evert Geradts (2009)

Evert Geradts (born 9 June 1943, The Hague) is a Dutch comics artist and former underground comics artist. He later became a prolific Disney comics writer and artist too. He is the winner with Leny Zwalve of the 1977 Stripschapprijs.

== Influences ==
Geradts have claimed his major influences were from Walt Kelly, Al Capp, Carl Barks and Tex Avery.
