= Eddie de Jong =

Dutch cartoonist

Eddie de Jong (born 1950, Amsterdam) is a Dutch cartoonist, best known as a frequent collaborator with René Windig. Together they created the newspaper comic Heinz, about a grumpy sarcastic cat. They won the 1991 Stripschapprijs. They created the album covers for records by the rock band Rockin' Belly.
