= Jesse van Muylwijck =

Dutch cartoonist

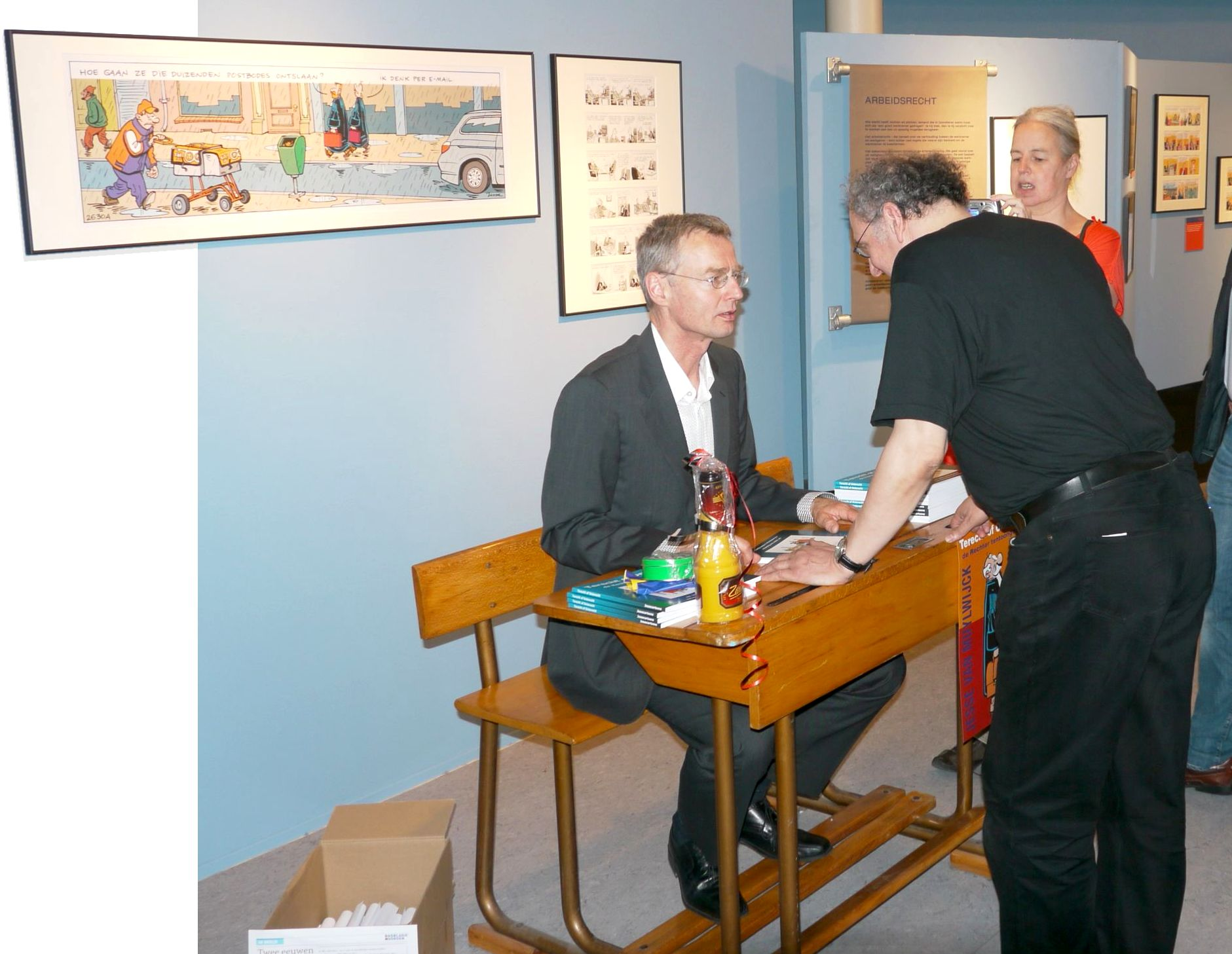
A picture of Jesse van Muylwijck during a book signing at the exhibition 'Rightly or wrongly' in the Netherlands Comic Museum in Groningen, on the occasion of 200 years of justice in the Netherlands

Jesse van Muylwijck (born 19 March 1961, Groningen) is a Dutch comics artist and caricaturist, best-known for his humor comic De Rechter. He is the winner of the 2010 Stripschapprijs.
