= Eric Heuvel =

Dutch cartoonist

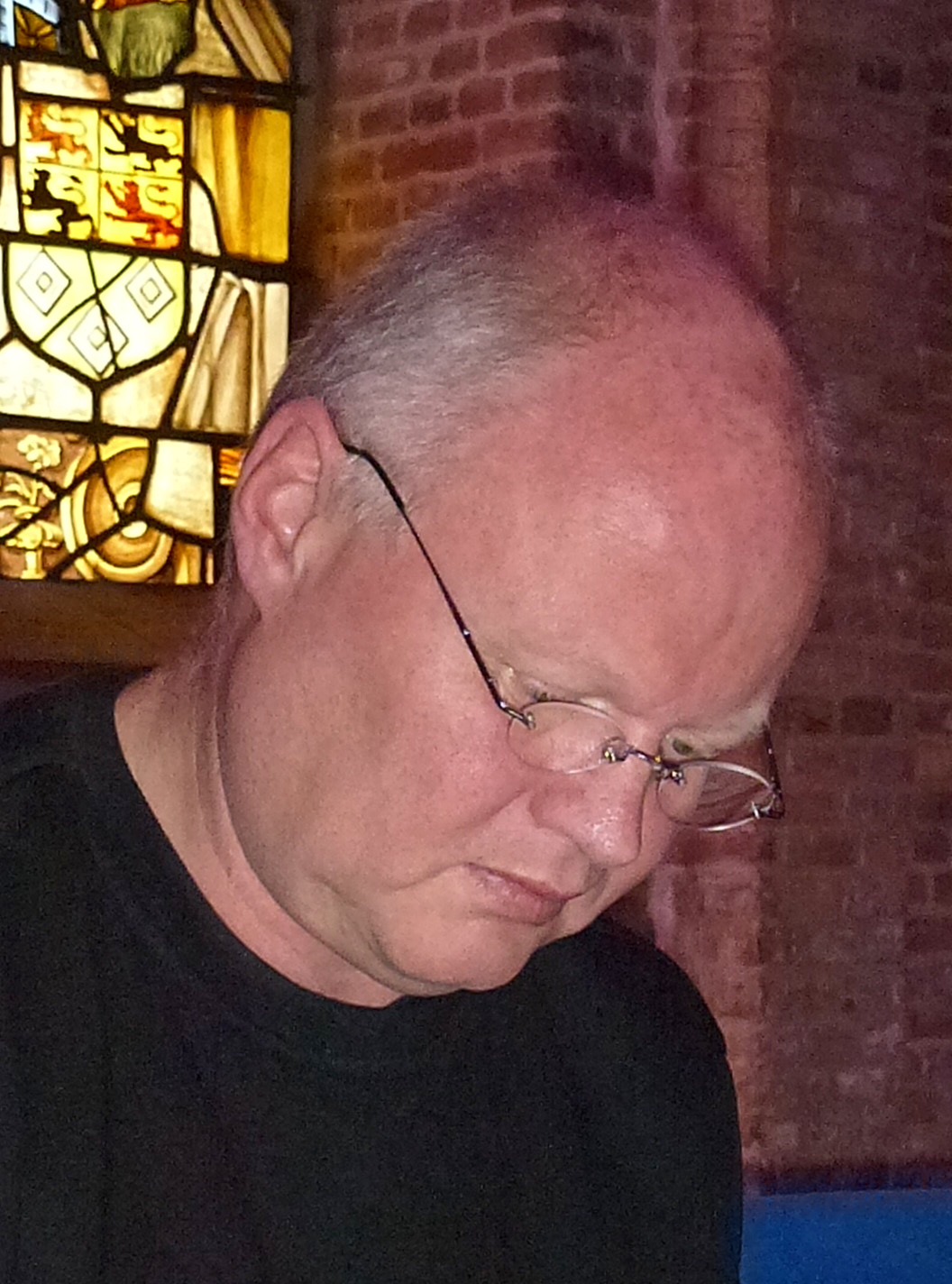
- Heuvel in Gouda
- Born: Eric Heuvel; 25 May 1960 (age 66) Amsterdam, Netherlands
- Area: Writer
- Notable works: Bud Broadway; January Jones
- Awards: full list

Eric Heuvel (born 25 May 1960, Amsterdam) is a Dutch comic book artist best known for his graphic novels about World War II.

== Bibliography ==
- January Jones
1. Dodenrit naar Monte Carlo
2. De Schedel van Sultan Mkwawa
3. De Schatten van Koning Salomo
4. Het Pinkerton Draaiboek
5. De Horens van de Stier
6. Het graf van de Zeppelin
- Bud Broadway
1. De weg naar Java
2. Het geheim van Raffles
3. Banzai op Borneo
4. Het einde van Indië
5. Show in de Sahara
6. De toorts van Caesar
7. De dubbele Duce
8. De lange weg naar huis
- Geheim van de tijd (eng: Secrets of history)
1. Gat in de Cirkel
2. Eerste Tekens
3. De tijdwachters
4. Een nieuw begin
- De ontdekking (eng: A Family Secret)
- De schuilhoek (eng: The shelter)
- Frontstad Rotterdam (eng: Front city Rotterdam)
- De zoektocht (eng: The Search)
- De terugkeer (eng: The return)

== Awards ==
He is the winner of the 2012 Stripschapprijs.
