= Aloys Oosterwijk =

Dutch cartoonist and courtroom sketch artist

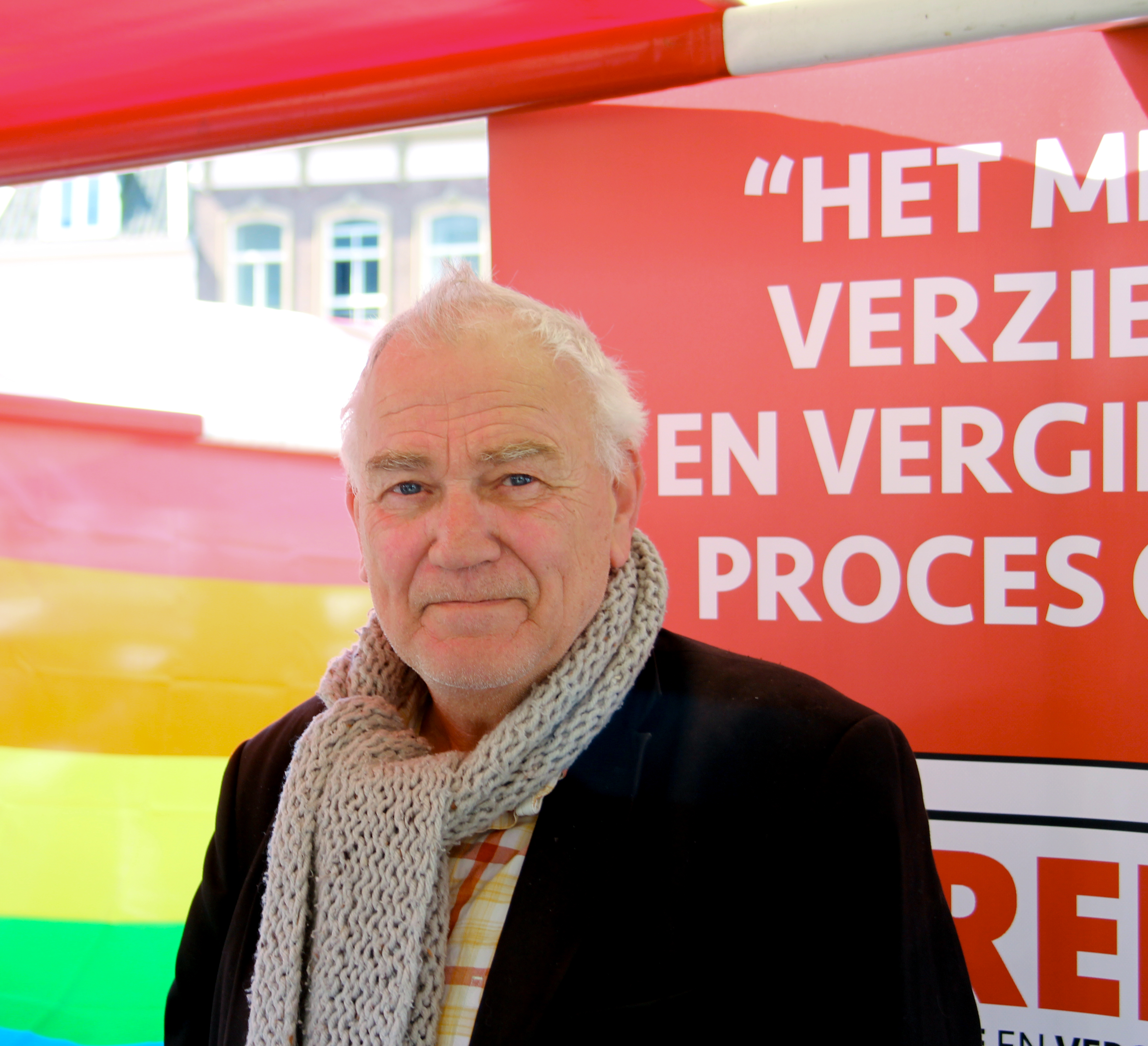
- Oosterwijk in May 2024
- Born: 25 June 1956; Schalkhaar
- Occupation: cartoonist, courtroom sketch artist

Aloys Oosterwijk (born 25 June 1956 in Schalkhaar) is a Dutch cartoonist. He is the winner of the 2007 Stripschapprijs. Since 1996 he publishes a weekly comic strip Willems Wereld in the Dutch magazine Panorama. Oosterwijk is also known as a courtroom sketch artist.
