= Gerard Leever =

Dutch cartoonist (born 1960)

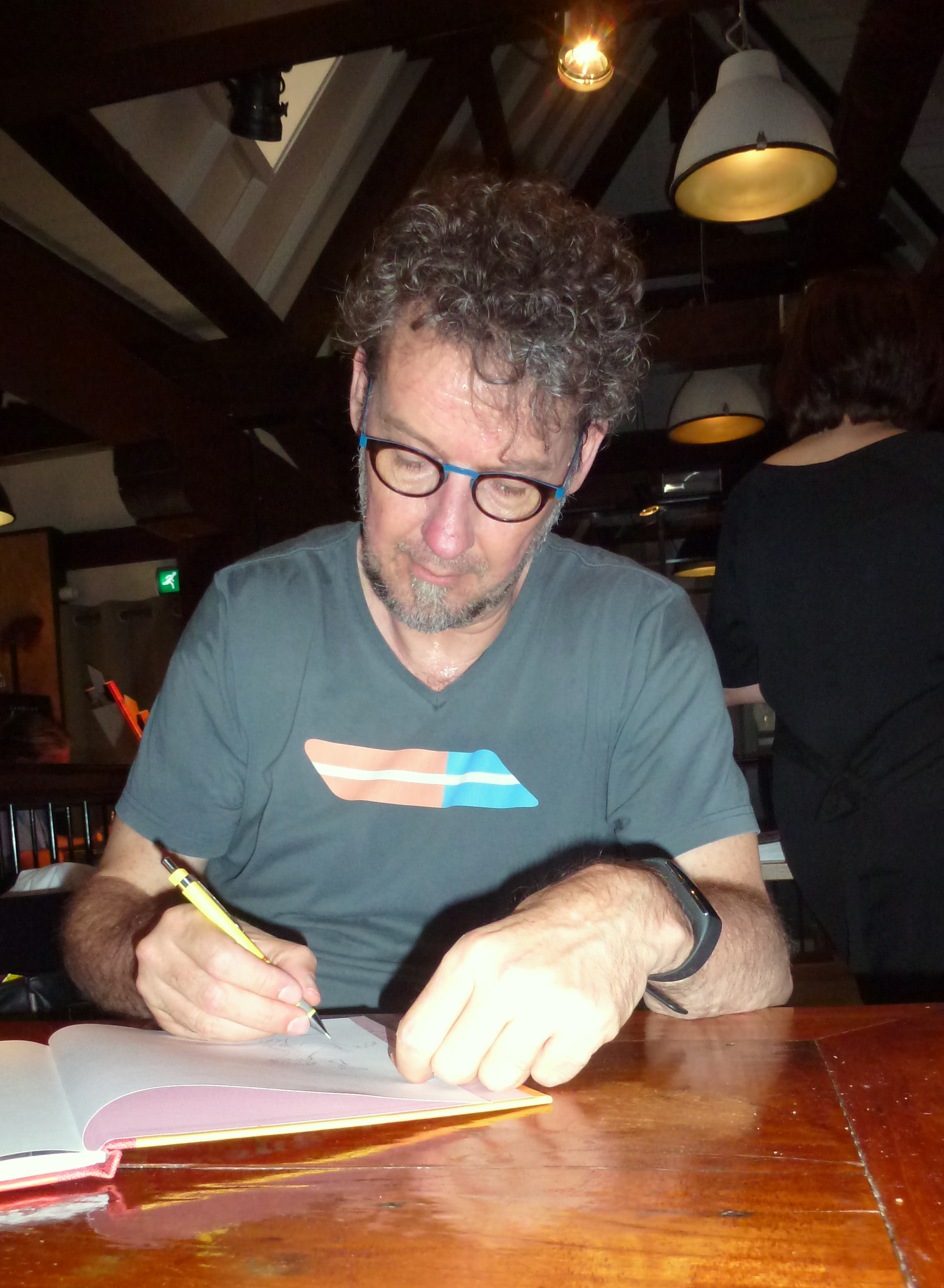
Gerard Leever

Gerard Leever (born 30 April 1960, Naarden) is a Dutch cartoonist. He is the winner of the 2006 Stripschapprijs.
