= Leny Zwalve =

Dutch cartoonist

Leny or Lena Zwalve is a Dutch cartoonist. She is the winner with Evert Geradts of the 1977 Stripschapprijs. In the mid 1970s she moved to California, where she and her husband Glenn Bray are publishers and maintain the estate and art of Stanisław Szukalski.
