= Fred de Heij =

Dutch cartoonist (born 1960)

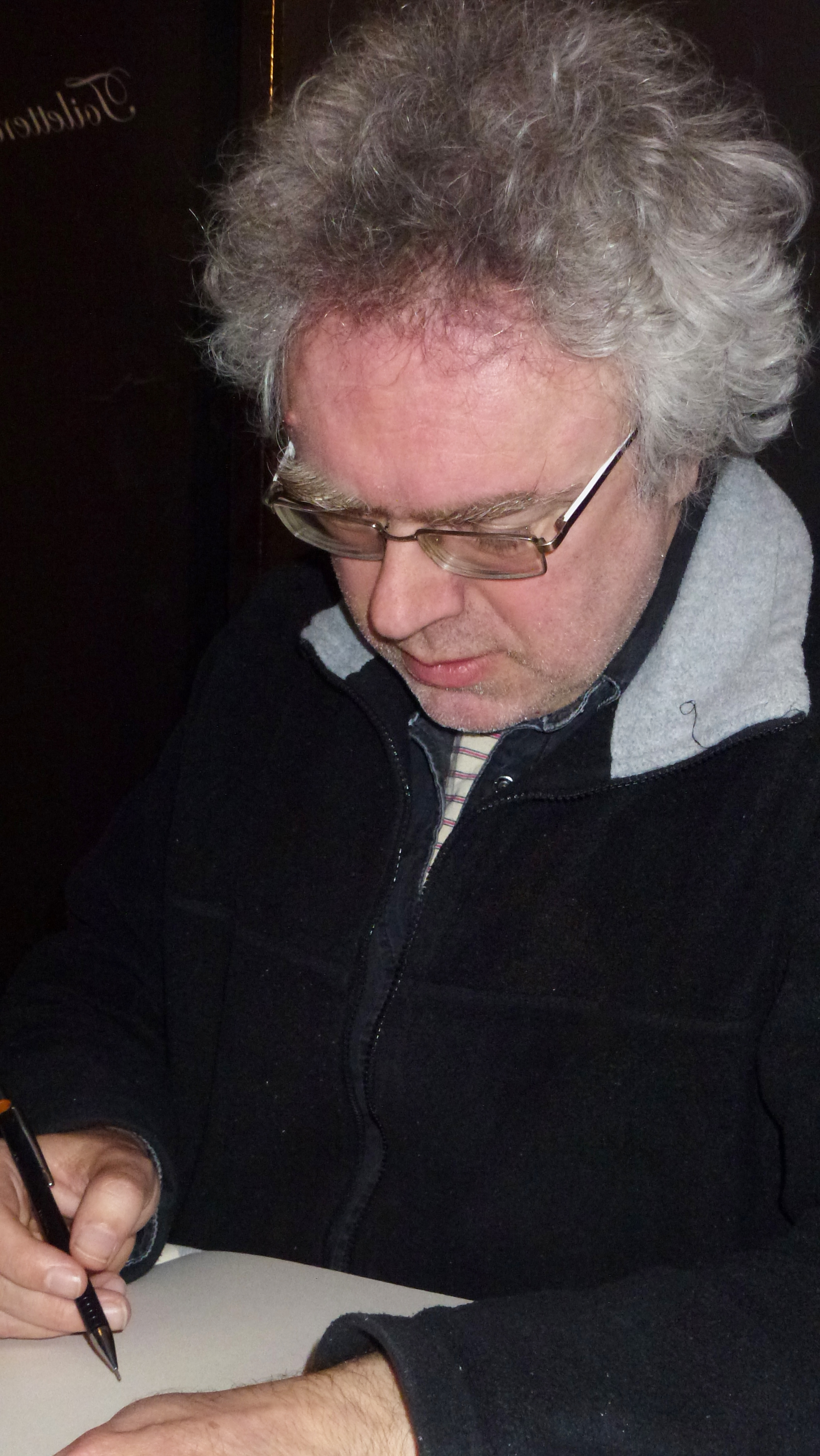
Fred de Heij

Fred de Heij (born February 21, 1960, in Amsterdam) is a Dutch cartoonist. He is the winner of the 2014 Stripschapprijs.
