= Joost Swarte =

Dutch cartoonist and graphic designer (born 1947)

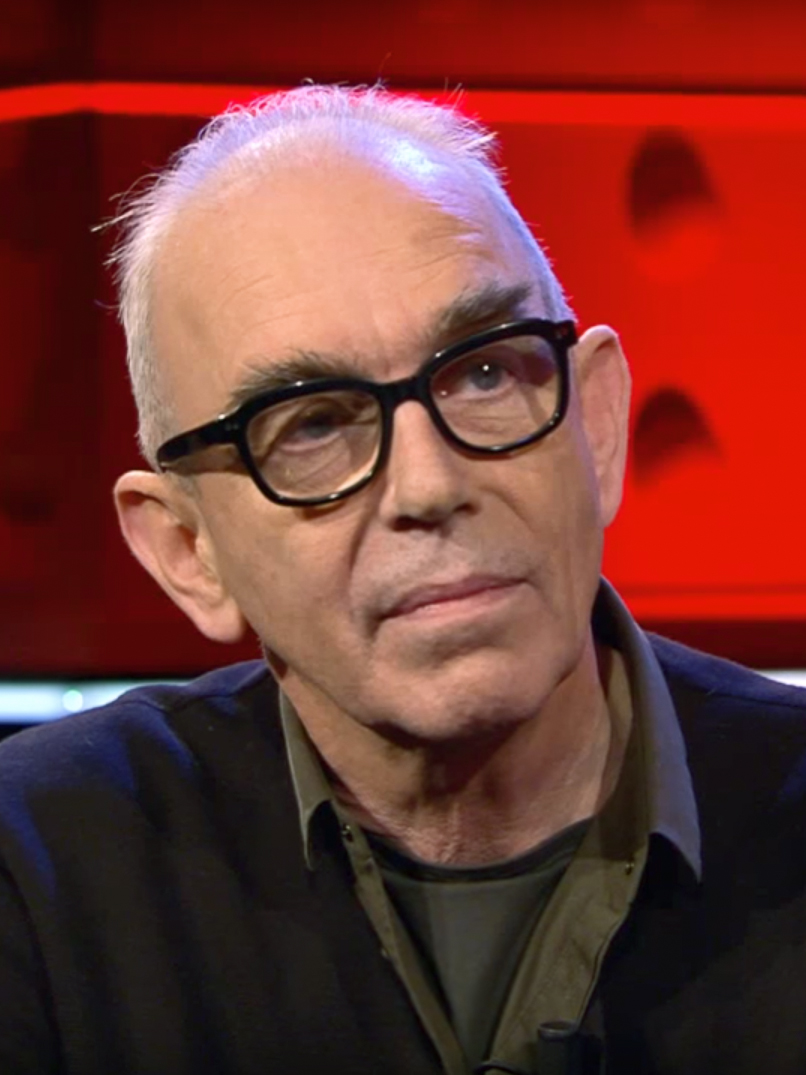
- Joost Swarte (2017)
- Born: Joost Swarte; 24 December 1947 (age 78) Heemstede, Netherlands
- Areas: Artist, Writer, Graphic Designer
- Notable works: Swarte, Hors Serie; Modern Papier

Joost Swarte (born 24 December 1947 in Heemstede) is a Dutch cartoonist and graphic designer. He is best known for his ligne claire or clear line style of drawing, a term he coined.

Comic series and characters by Swarte include Katoen en Pinbal, Jopo de Pojo, Anton Makassar, Dr Ben Cine and Niet Zo, Maar Zo- Passi, Messa. He is however more famous for his numerous drawings, stamps, posters, cards, LP and CD covers, and for his magazine covers (most noteworthy the Dutch magazine Vrij Nederland, the American magazine The New Yorker, and the Belgian magazine HUMO and the Italian architecture magazine Abitare).

== Background and early work ==
Swarte, born 24 December 1947 in Heemstede, studied industrial design in Eindhoven and started drawing comics in the late sixties. In 1971 he started his own comic magazine Modern Papier and made regular contributions to the Dutch comic magazine Tante Leny Presenteert.

== Increased recognition ==
International recognition started around 1980 when Swarte took part for the first time in the international comic show Salon International de la Bande Dessinée in Angoulême (France). His work has been translated into English, French, Spanish, Italian and German. Swarte, Hors Serie, a survey of his work, was published by Futuropolis (Paris) in 1984.

In 1985, he founded the publishing house Oog & Blik with Hansje Joustra. Joost published his own comics and silkscreens, as well as books by other cartoonists and a large number of Dutch translations of foreign comics.

In 1992, Swarte initiated the Stripdagen, a biennial international comic event held in Haarlem.

In recent years, Swarte has created many illustrations for the New Yorker magazine. In 2007 Swarte, a former scout, designed the Dutch 2007 Europa stamp with the subject one hundred years of scouting.

Swarte has produced a restored collection of almost all of his comics work (excluding the several hundred pages of the "Katoen en Pinbal" children's series), an English-language version of which will be released in late 2011 by Fantagraphics Books under the title Is That All There Is?.

The cartoonist and critic Scott McCloud, in Understanding Comics (1993), wrote that "Joost Swarte's crisp elegant lines and jazzy designs speak of cool sophistication and irony."

== Work outside comics and graphic design ==
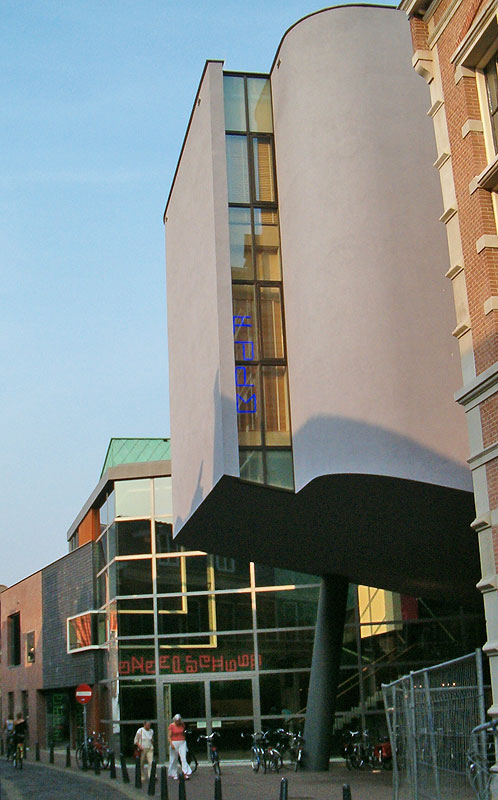
Schuur Haarlem (theatre building), designed by Joost Swarte, 1996

Apart from comics and graphic design, Swarte has also designed furniture, leaded and stained glass windows, murals and other objects. For his hometown Haarlem he designed a theatre building (Schuur, formerly Toneelschuur) that was built in cooperation with Mecanoo Architects.

== Awards ==
Swarte received numerous international prizes for his work. In 2004, Joost Swarte received a knighthood from Her Majesty Queen Beatrix of the Netherlands.

- 1981: Best Foreign Artist at the Prix Saint-Michel, Belgium
- 1998: Stripschapprijs, Netherlands
- 2008: Communication Arts Award of Excellence, United States
- 2012: Marten Toonder Prize for his entire oeuvre
- 2018: Vlag en Wimpel (Dutch children's books) for En toen De Stijl
