= Schuur (theatre) =

Coordinates: 52°22′54″N 4°38′21″E

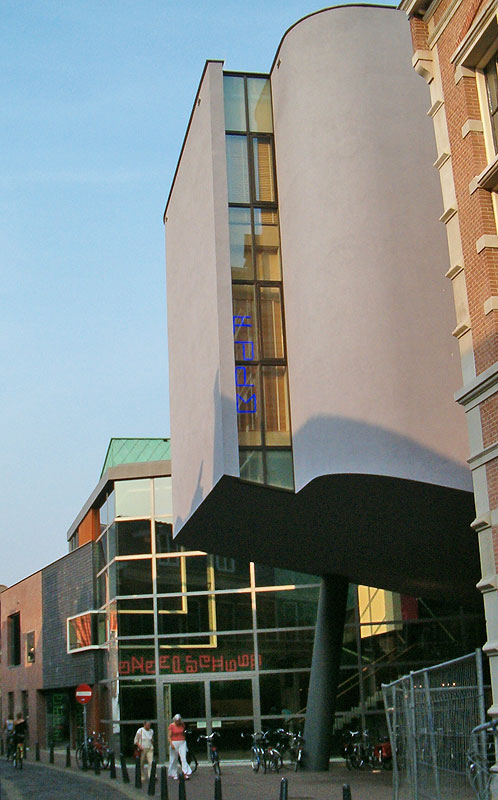
De Schuur in the Lange Begijnestraat. The building was designed by Joost Swarte, a cartoonist.

De Schuur (previously known as Toneelschuur until 1 September 2021) is a theater in Haarlem, Netherlands.

The building has two theaters and two movie theaters. In the latter more alternative movies are shown (no Hollywood blockbusters).

From 1998 to 2003 the current building of the theater at the Lange Begijnestraat 9 was renovated as part of the Appelaar plan. The new design of the building was made by Joost Swarte, a Dutch cartoonist, in 1996. It was the first time in the Netherlands that a building was designed by a cartoonist. Joost Swarte was assisted by Mecanoo, an architecture bureau.

Before 2003 the theater was located at Smedestraat 23.

Frans Lommerse was the manager of the Schuur until 2018. He was succeeded by Marelie van Rongen.

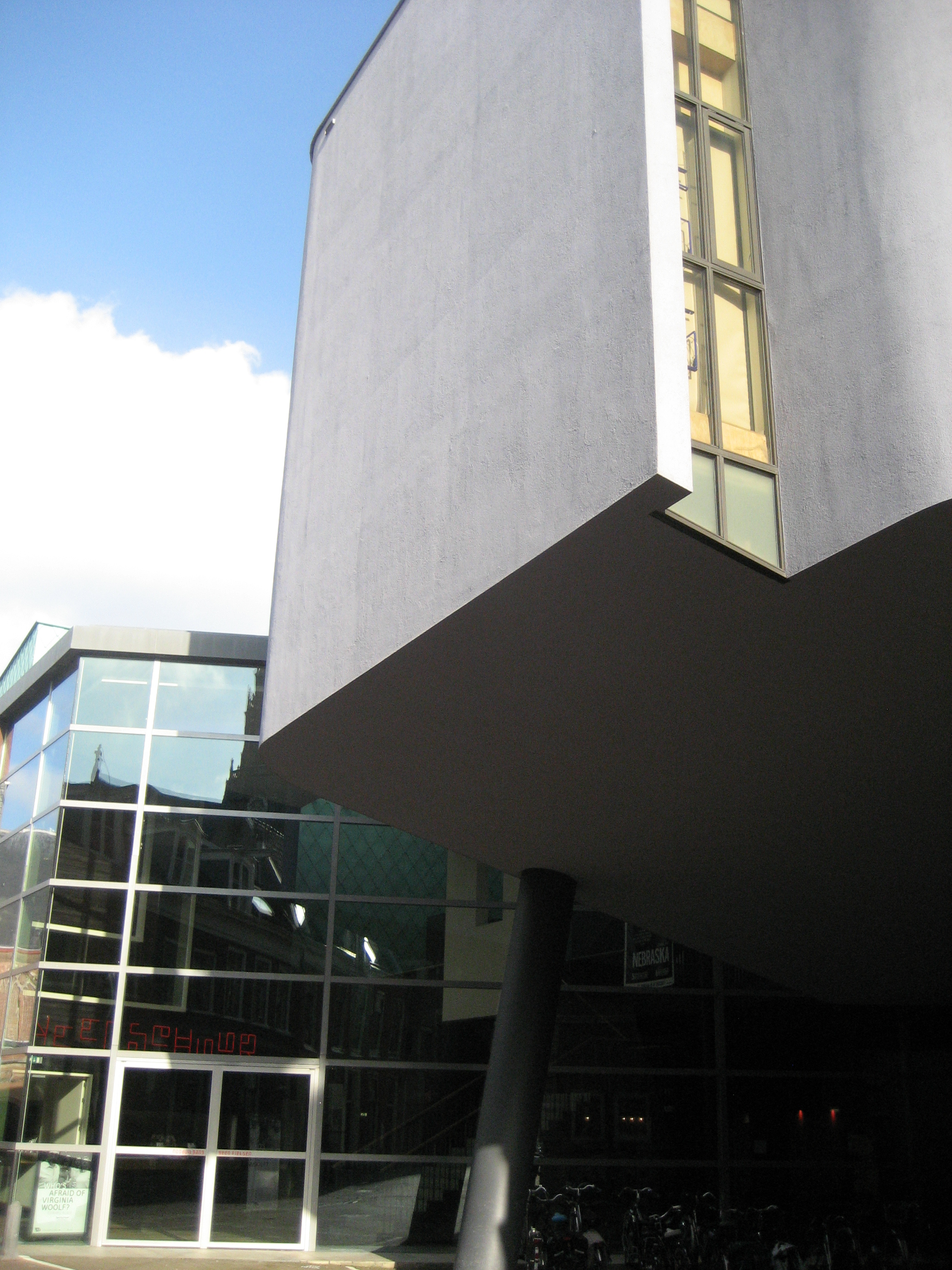
Lange Begijnestraat, Haarlem

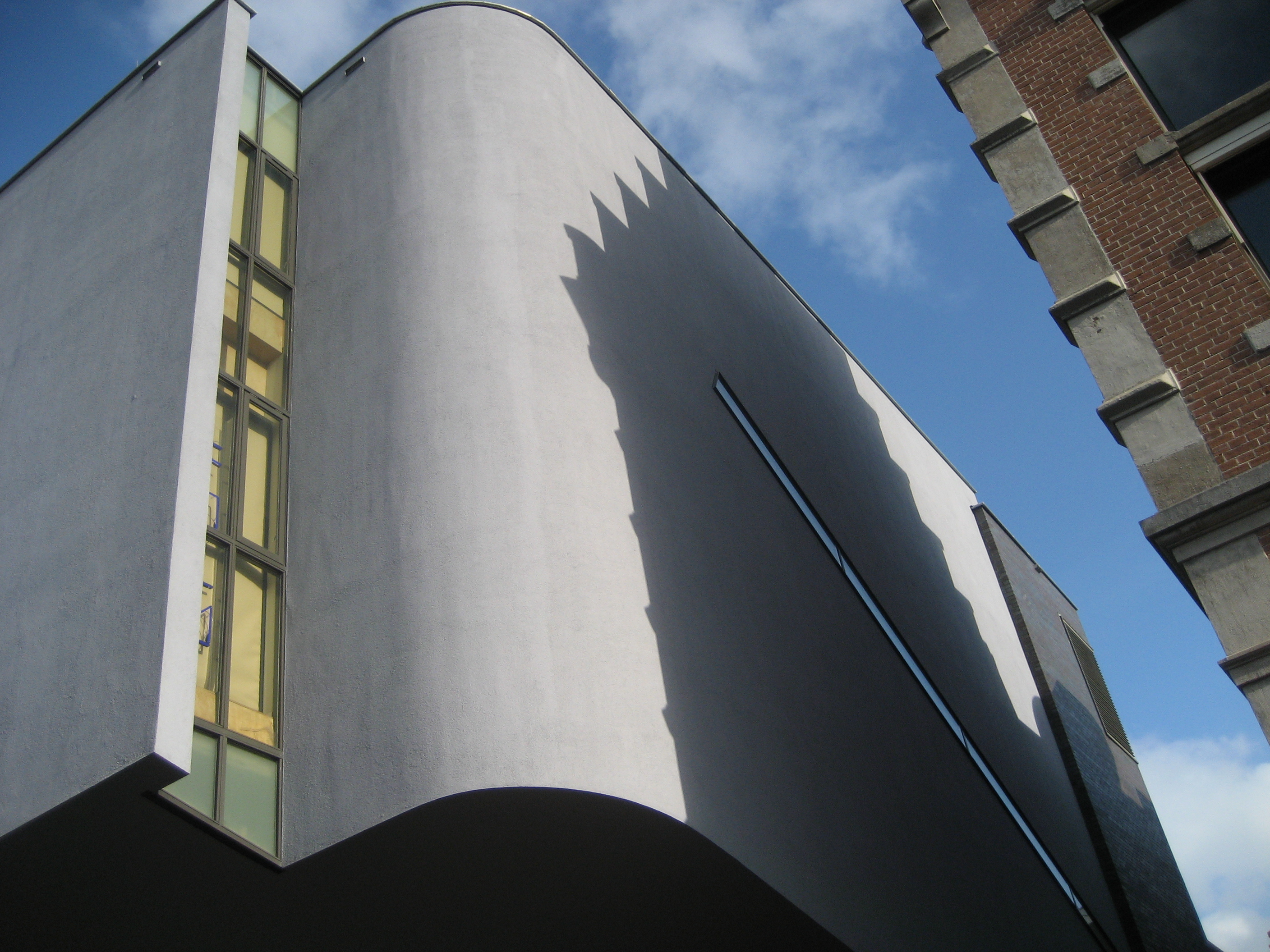
Lange Begijnestraat, Haarlem

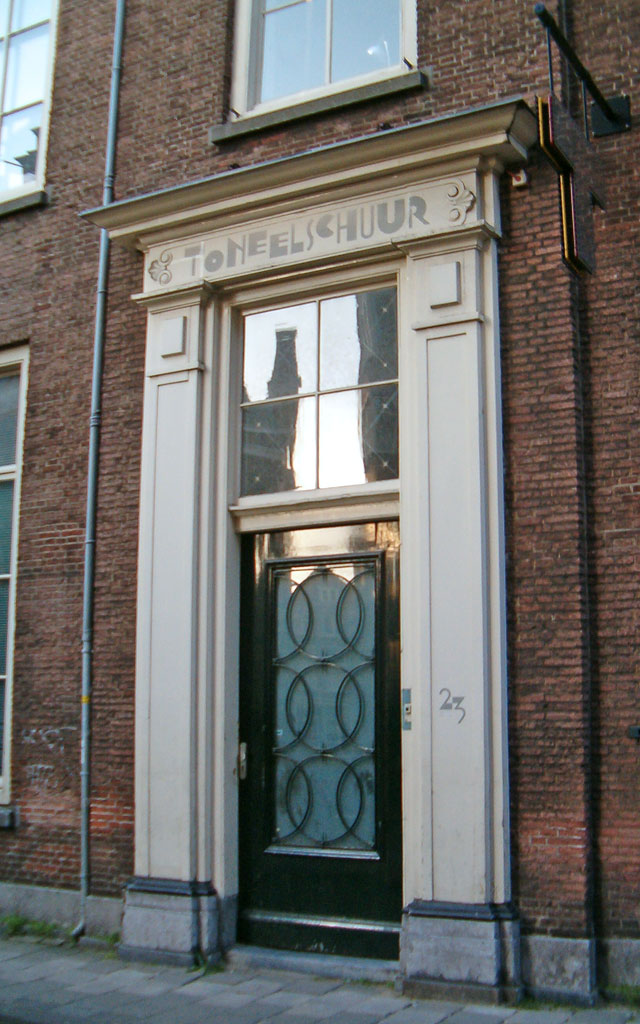
Entrance of the old building of the Toneelschuur in the Smedestraat; since 2003 no longer in use
