= Barbara Stok =

Dutch cartoonist

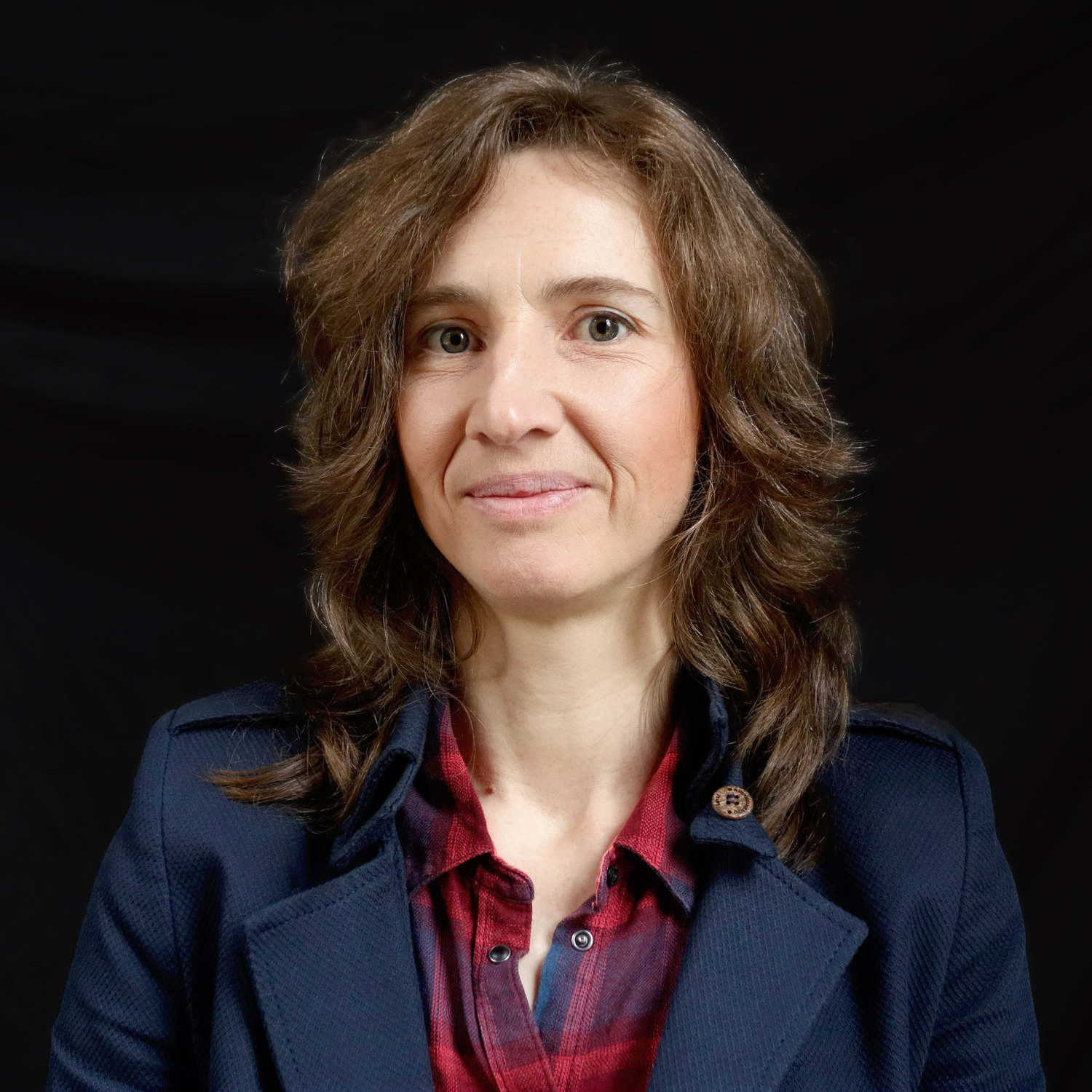
- Born: 24 February 1970 (age 56); Groningen

Barbara Stok (born 24 February 1970, Groningen) is a Dutch cartoonist, best known for her graphic novel Vincent.

== Biography and work ==
Much of Stok's work is autobiographical; she began drawing comics in the 1990s and self-published Barbaraal, a series of books set in Groningen, often in and around Vera, a center for underground rock music. She never attended an art or design school, wary that she might lose her personal style. Her 2003 graphic novel Je geld of je leven ("Your money or your life") deals with her work as a journalist and the burn-out that followed it. The autobiographical compilation Dan maak je maar zin, deals with the death of the author/main character's brother-in-law and probes the meaning of life. She won the 2009 Stripschapprijs for her oeuvre.

Also in 2009, Stok was commissioned by publishing company Nijgh & Van Ditmar and the Van Gogh Museum to write and draw a book on Van Gogh. Her Vincent is a graphic novel depicting Vincent van Gogh's years in and around Arles; it is translated into a number of languages including English. James Smart, in The Guardian, praised it as "a vibrant, sad account of Van Gogh's move to Arles and his struggle with mental illness". That same year she was given a weekly slot in the national daily newspaper NRC Handelsblad.

In 2021, Stok published De filosoof, de hond en de bruiloft, a graphic novel about the Greek philosopher Hipparchia, later in 2002 translated by Michele Hutchison as The Philosopher, the Dog and the Wedding for SelfMadeHero. In 2025, Nijgh & Van Ditmar published Wat is goed leven? Socrates en het belangrijkste, her graphic novel about Socrates.

== Electoral history ==
Electoral history of Barbara Stok
Year	Body	Party	Pos.	Votes	Result		Ref.
Year	Body	Party	Pos.	Votes	Party seats	Individual	Ref.
2024	European Parliament	Party for the Animals	36 (Note: Stok participated as a lijstduwer.)	2,084	1	Lost	
