= Hein de Kort =

Dutch cartoonist (born 1956)

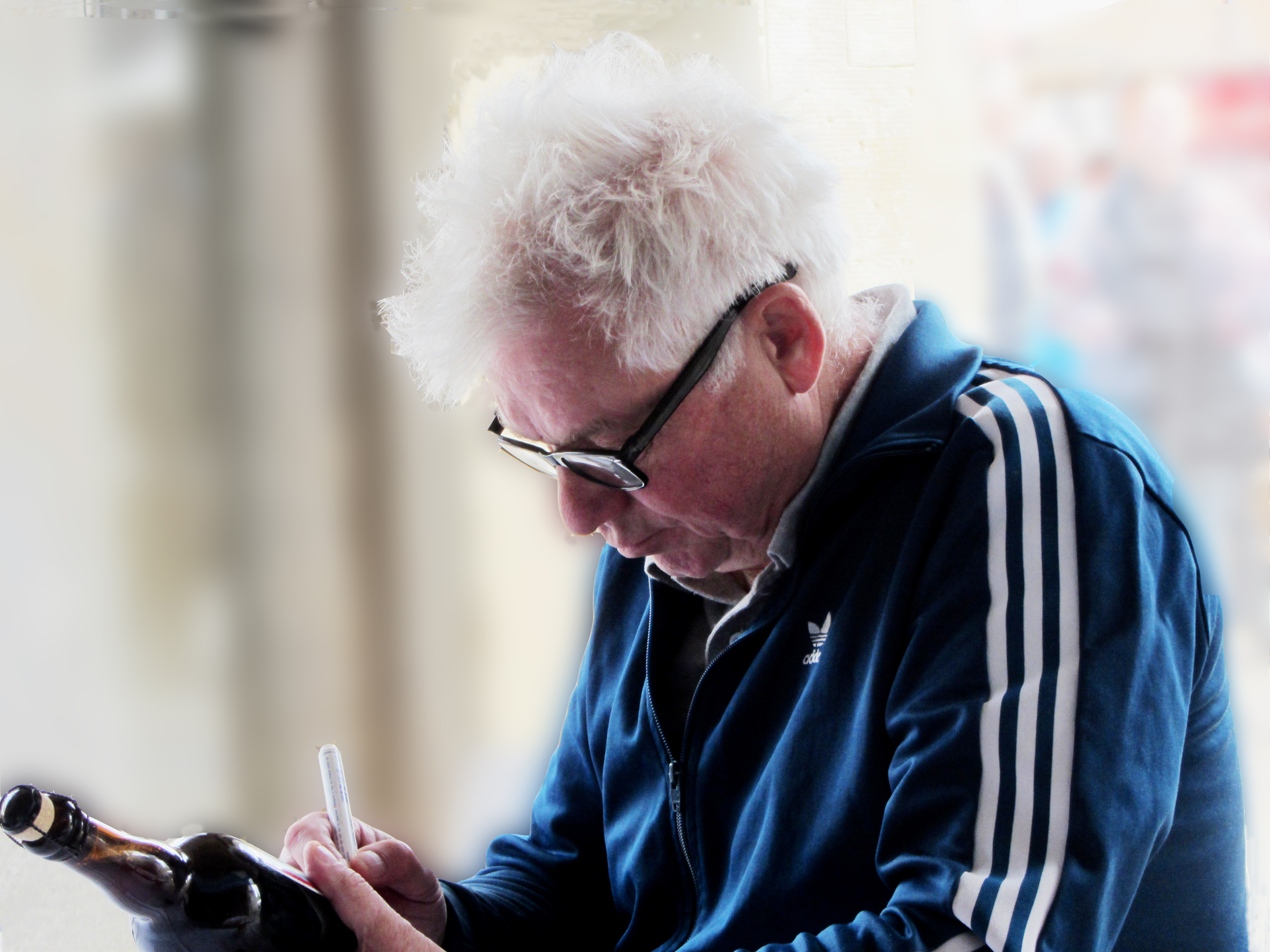
de Kort in 2022

Hein de Kort (born 4 October 1956, Laren) is a Dutch comics artist. He is the winner of the 1992 Stripschapprijs.
