= Typex (comics artist) =

Dutch cartoonist

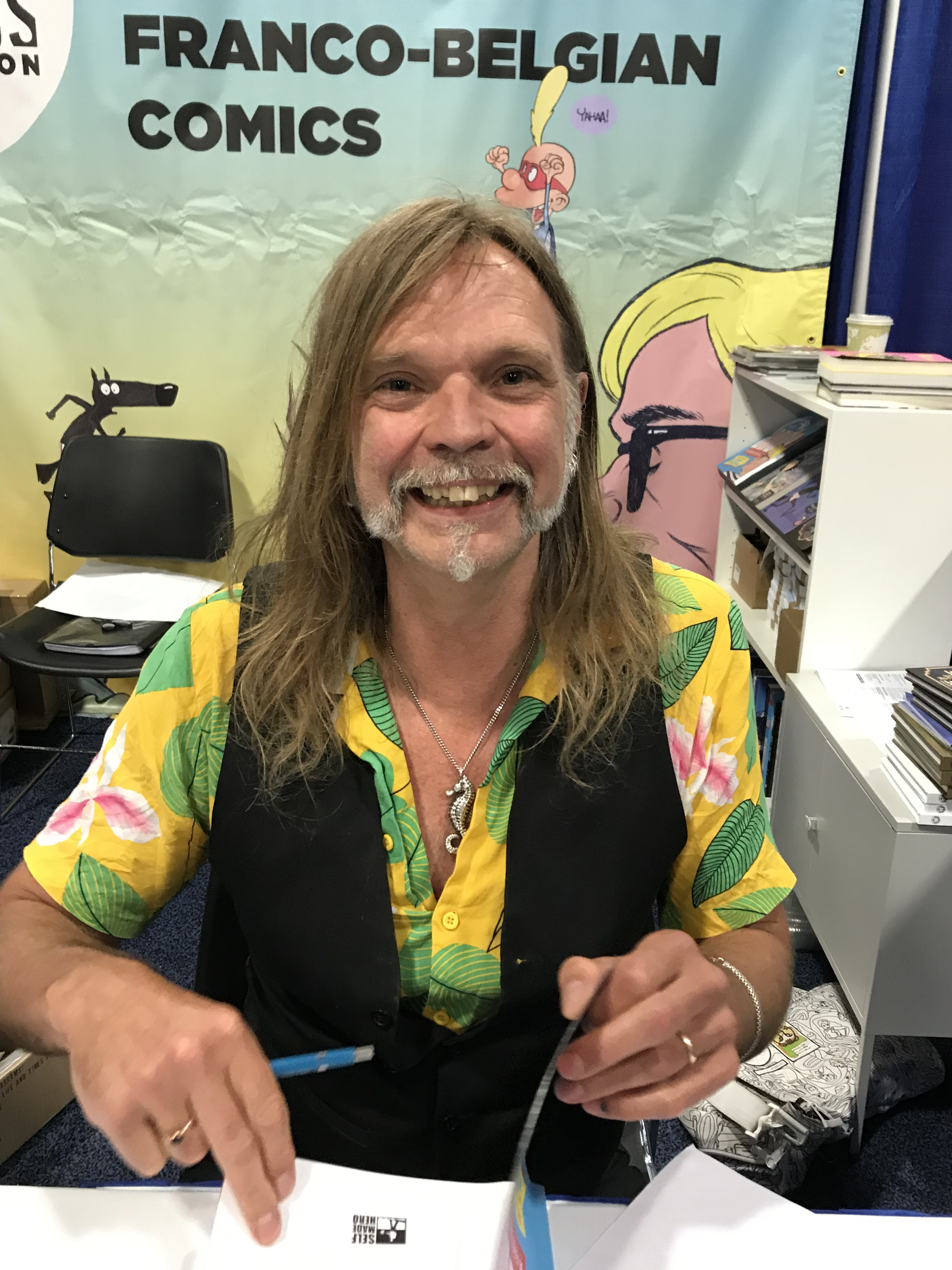

Typex (born 1 September 1962 in Amsterdam) is a Dutch comics artist, best known for his autobiographical graphic novels about historical characters, like Rembrandt Van Rijn, Andy Warhol and Moses Mendelssohn. He is the winner of the 2019 Stripschapprijs.
