= Stanisław Szukalski =

Polish-American sculptor (1893–1987)

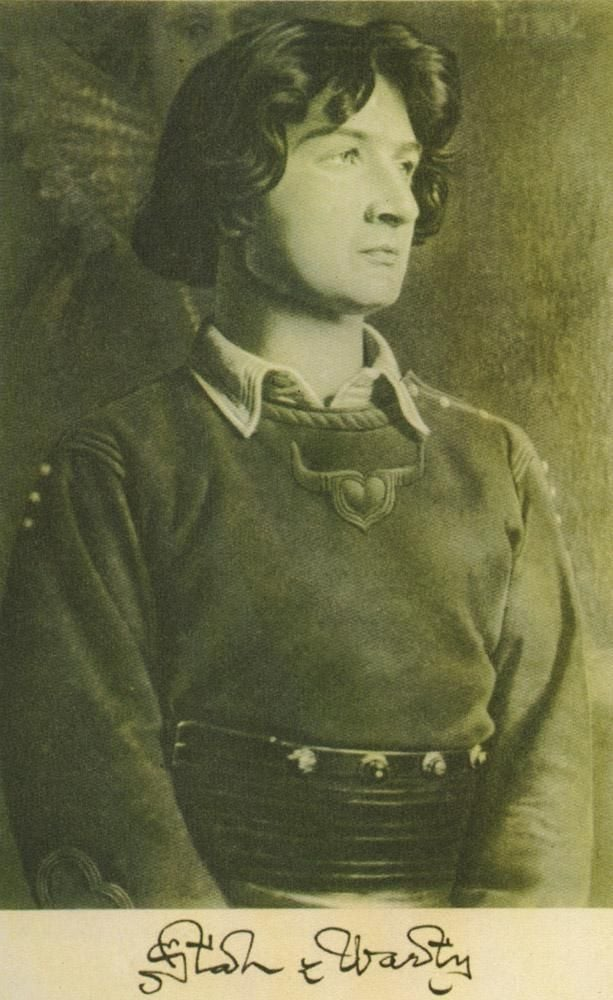
- Szukalski in Kraków, 1936
- Born: 13 December 1893; Warta, Congress Poland
- Died: 19 May 1987 (aged 93); Burbank, California, U.S.
- Education: Art Institute of Chicago

Stanisław Szukalski (13 December 1893 – 19 May 1987) was a Polish sculptor and painter who became a part of the Chicago Renaissance. Szukalski's art appears to show influences from ancient cultures, Egypt, Slavs, and Aztecs combined with elements of art nouveau and other currents of early 20th century European modernism: cubism, expressionism, and futurism. During the 1920s, he was hailed as Poland's "greatest living artist". His art was dubbed "Bent Classicism".

He developed a pseudoscientific-historical theory of Zermatism, positing that all human culture was derived from post-deluge Easter Island and that humankind was locked in an eternal struggle with the Sons of Yeti ("Yetinsyny"), the offspring of Yeti and humans.

== Life ==
=== Between Poland and Chicago ===
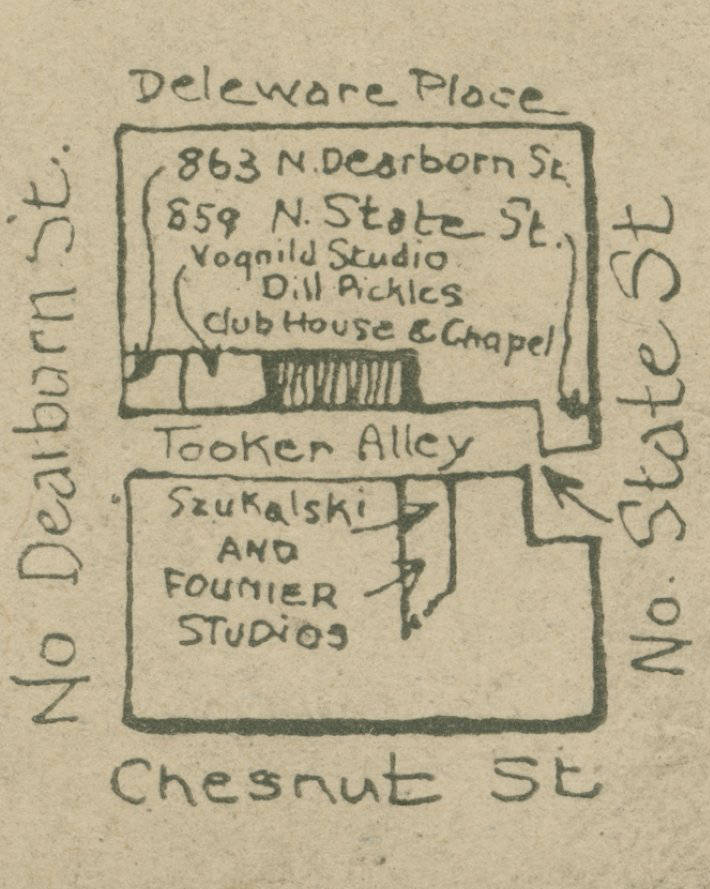
Tooker Alley on map of 2 March 1921 in Chicago with "Szukalski" studio location across from the "Dill Pickle Club House and Chapel"

Szukalski was born in Warta, Congress Poland and was raised in Gidle. He arrived at New York with his mother, Konstancja, and sister, Alfreda, on 27 June 1907; they then went to Chicago to join his father, Dyonizy Szukalski, a blacksmith. A child prodigy in sculpture, he enrolled at age 13 at the Art Institute of Chicago. A year later, Sculptor Antoni Popiel persuaded Szukalski's parents to send him back to Poland, to enroll at Kraków's Academy of Fine Arts in 1910. There he studied sculpture under Konstanty Laszczka for three years. He returned to Chicago in 1913.

Back in the U.S., Szukalski joined the arts scene in Chicago, becoming a vital part of the "Chicago Renaissance." In November 1914, he exhibited seven of his sculptures at the Annual Exhibition of American Oil Paintings and Sculpture in the Art Institute's galleries. He had two solo exhibitions at the Art Institute, in 1916 and 1917, as well as one at the progressive Arts Club in 1919; he also exhibited regularly in the juried annuals at the Art Institute. In 1922, he married Helen Walker, the artist daughter of Dr. Samuel J. Walker, a prominent member of Chicago society.

=== Mickiewicz monument in Vilnius ===
The first design proposed for a monument to Adam Mickiewicz (a Polish poet, dramatist and political activist) to be built in the city of Vilnius was promoted by Zbigniew Pronaszko of Vilnius University (then, Stefan Batory University in the Second Polish Republic). However, in May 1925, a contest was declared for the design of the monument. The period for submitting designs was extended a number of times, with 67 designs ultimately submitted. The jury consisted of Vilnius's municipal authorities and representatives of the arts scene, with General Lucjan Żeligowski at the helm.

Szukalski won first prize in the contest. His design for the monument showed Mickiewicz, naked, lying upon a sacrificial altar. The sculpture was to be situated on a large pedestal in the shape of an Aztec pyramid. A White Eagle, Poland's national symbol, was perched at the figure's side, where it symbolically drank blood from the poet's wound.

Szukalski's design was highly divisive among Poland's intelligentsia, leadership, and art critics, as well as ordinary individuals. The polarized atmosphere led the monument committee to arrange for a new contest, this time limited to concepts by artists who were invited to participate. The winner was Henryk Kuna, whose proposal was then chosen to be built. However, due to a number of problems involving financing as well as a suitable location, the monument's construction dragged on. With the outbreak of World War II and the incorporation of Vilnius into Lithuania, the project was abandoned.

=== European travels ===
In 1925, Szukalski participated in the International Exhibition of Modern and Decorative Arts in Paris, where he won numerous awards. However, his success was criticized by the Polish press because Szukalski, representing Poland in the exhibition, did not even live in that country. On 20 June 1926, in Paris, Helen Walker Szukalski gave birth to Szukalski's only child, a daughter, Elżbieta Kalina (Kalinka) Szukalski.

After traveling in Europe from 1926 to 1928, Szukalski went to Kraków, Poland, where he had a retrospective exhibition in 1929. In 1929 he was a founder of an artistic movement called Tribe of the Horned Heart (Szczep Rogate Serce), centered on Polish artists who sought inspiration in the pagan or pre-Christian history of Poland.

In 1929, Szukalski published Projects in Design: Sculpture and Architecture, containing drawings that ranged from highly detailed ornamental architectural elements (fireplaces, doorways, and windows) to idealized city plans (bridges, tombstones, and monuments) befitting the heroes of Poland. In 1932, he and Helen divorced.

Ben Hecht, who had met Szukalski in 1914, described Szukalski in his 1954 autobiography, A Child of the Century, "For twenty years my friend ... experienced disasters which would have killed off a dozen businessmen. Sickness, poverty and hunger nipped everlasting at his heels. ... during his struggles he heard only the catcalls of critics and the voices of derision. Yet when I saw him in 1934, I saw a man who had feasted on power and whose eyes smiled with triumph."

In September 1934, in Hollywood, Szukalski married Joan Lee Donovan (b. 1910), who had been his daughter's kindergarten teacher in Chicago. The wedding was at the home of screenwriter Wallace Smith, who was the best man.

=== Return to Poland ===
In 1936, Szukalski returned to Poland, supported financially by the Minister of the Treasury. He completed several sculptures, most notably the monument of Bolesław Chrobry, and decorated the façade of the Silesian Museum in Katowice, as well as a local government building in that city. Poland declared Szukalski the country's greatest living artist. The government gave him a studio, the largest in Warsaw, and proclaimed it the Szukalski National Museum. It contained many of his intricate paintings and massive sculptures, notable for their dramatic mythological imagery; Szukalski had brought much of his lifetime work with him to Poland.

During the siege of Warsaw by the German army in September 1939, Szukalski was hurt in the initial bombing attack on Warsaw, which destroyed much of his studio. With two suitcases, Szukalski and his wife took refuge in the US embassy, since both were American citizens. By early November, they were among about 100 Americans remaining in Warsaw. The two eventually escaped from Poland and were able to make their way back to the United States.

Szukalski had come to Poland with all his unsold works, encouraged by the prospect of building a museum devoted to his art; he left almost all of his work in Poland. Most of what had not been lost in the bombing attacks was destroyed by the occupying Germans.

=== California ===
In 1940, Szukalski and his wife settled in Los Angeles where he did odd jobs in film studios, designing scenery; occasionally sculpting and drawing.

During the latter part of his 75-year-long career, Szukalski's major projects in sculpture were Prometheus (1943), designed for Paris in homage to French partisans, the Rooster of Gaul (1960), a gigantic and complex structure that he wanted the U.S. to give France to reciprocate for the Statue of Liberty. His Katyn (1979) is a monument to commemorate the death of more than 20,000 Polish officers and intellectuals killed by the Soviets during World War II; and a monument intended for the city of Venice (1982), featuring the Polish pope John Paul II. None of these projects went much further than Szukalski's immediate friends.

In 1971, Glenn Bray, a publisher who had previously specialized in the work of Mad Magazine artist Basil Wolverton, befriended Szukalski, and introduced many of his friends to Szukalski. Bray published a book of Szukalski's art and philosophy, A Trough Full of Pearls / Behold! The Protong, in 1980, and a second volume of his art, Inner Portraits, in 1982. Those books led others, including George DiCaprio, Leonardo DiCaprio's father, to contact Szukalski; Di Caprio immediately became a close friend of Szukalski and his wife.

Szukalski's second wife, Joan, died in 1980. Following Szukalski's death in 1987, a group of his admirers spread his ashes on Easter Island, in the rock quarry of Rano Raraku.

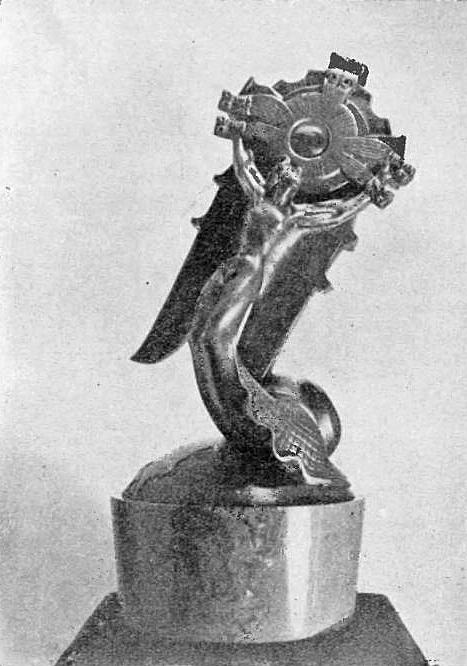
The Gordon Bennett Cup, 1936

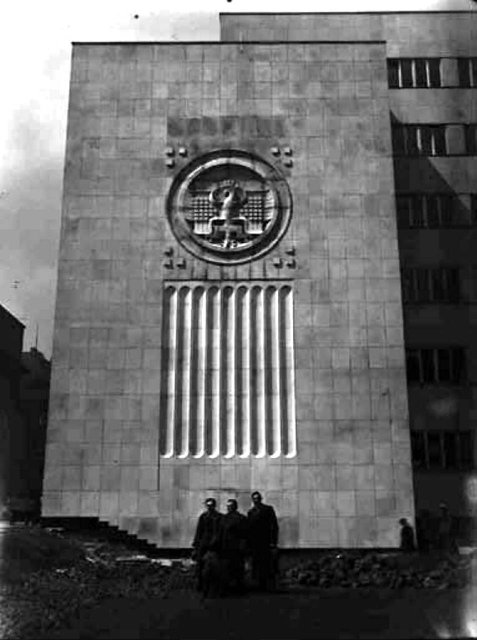
Szukalski's Eagle on a government building in Katowice, 1938-1939 (the bas-relief was destroyed during World War II)

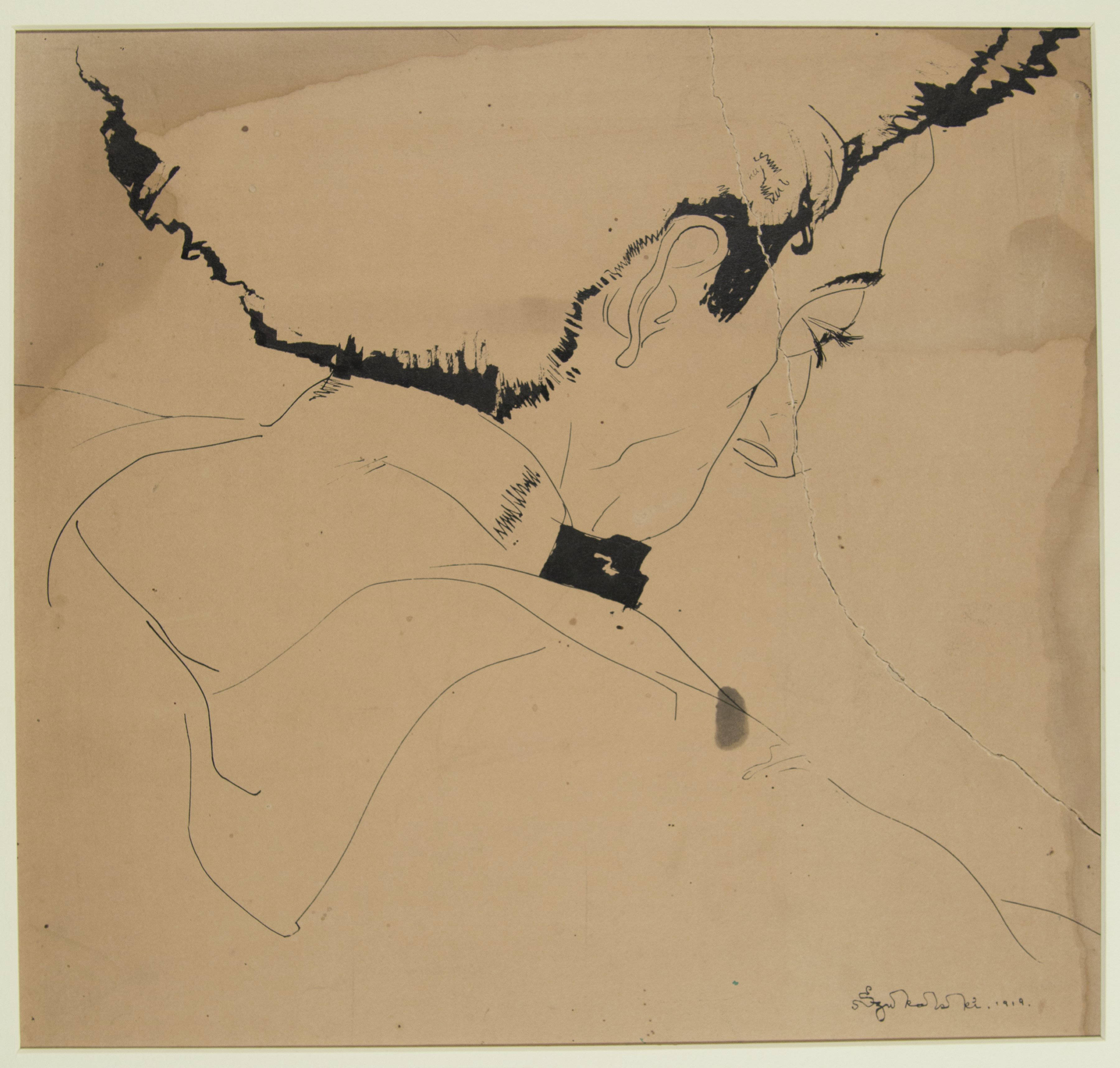
Ink drawing of unidentified sitter

== Zermatism and Protong ==
Beginning in 1940, Szukalski devoted most of his time to examining the mysteries of prehistoric ancient history of mankind, the formation and shaping of languages, faiths, customs, arts, and migration of peoples. He tried to unravel the origin of geographical names, gods, and symbols that have survived in various forms in various cultures. Through his research in these subjects, Szukalski claimed to have discovered Polish origins for various ancient places and people, in a language called Protong. According to Szukalski, Protong could be seen in phenomena ranging from the apparent Polish origins of Babylon to Jesus's Polish identity. The culmination of this work was a massive book called Protong (in Polish, Macimowa), its writing continued uninterruptedly for over 40 years. He wrote a manuscript of 42 volumes, totaling more than 25,000 pages, and including 14,000 illustrations. The volumes covered a variety of issues; his pen drawings of artifacts, which he considered "witnesses", were done to confirm his theories.

Zermatism, Szukalski's concept of world history, postulated that all human culture derived from post-deluge Easter Islanders who settled in Zermatt (hence the name) and that in all human languages one could find traces of the original, ancient mother-tongue of mankind (one with archaic Polish origins). In his view, humanity was locked in an eternal struggle with the Sons of Yeti ("Yetinsyny"), the offspring of Yeti and humans, who had enslaved humanity from time immemorial. He claimed that the figures of the god Pan on Greek vases depict creatures that actually existed, the product of Yeti apes raping human women. Szukalski used his considerable artistic talents to illustrate his theories, which, despite their lack of scientific merit, have gained a cult following largely on their aesthetic value.

== Legacy ==
Bray and his wife Lena Zwalve maintain Szukalski's estate and the great bulk of his existing art under the name "Archives Szukalski." In 1990, they published The Lost Tune: Early Works (1913-1930), a collection of photographs taken by Szukalski of his own work in that period.

Among Szukalski's admirers are Leonardo DiCaprio, who sponsored a retrospective exhibition entitled "Struggle" at the Laguna Art Museum in 2000; the Church of the SubGenius, which incorporates the Yetinsyny elements of Zermatism; Rick Griffin, Richard Sharpe Shaver, Robert Williams, H. R. Giger, the band Tool, and Ernst Fuchs, who said "Szukalski was the Michelangelo of the 20th century. And probably also of an age to come."

Szukalski's works are on permanent display at the Polish Museum of America in Chicago. None of his work in Warsaw survived the destruction during WWII. In addition to the Laguna retrospective, notable exhibitions of his work include "The Self-Born" at Varnish Fine Art, San Francisco, in 2005, and "Mantong and Protong," where Szukalski is paired with another unorthodox theorist of earth history, Richard Sharpe Shaver, at Pasadena City College in 2009.

In 2018, Leonardo DiCaprio produced a documentary entitled Struggle: The Life and Lost Art of Szukalski, which was released on Netflix as of 21 December 2018.
