= Paulus the woodgnome =

Dutch newspaper comic strip

Paulus de Boskabouter
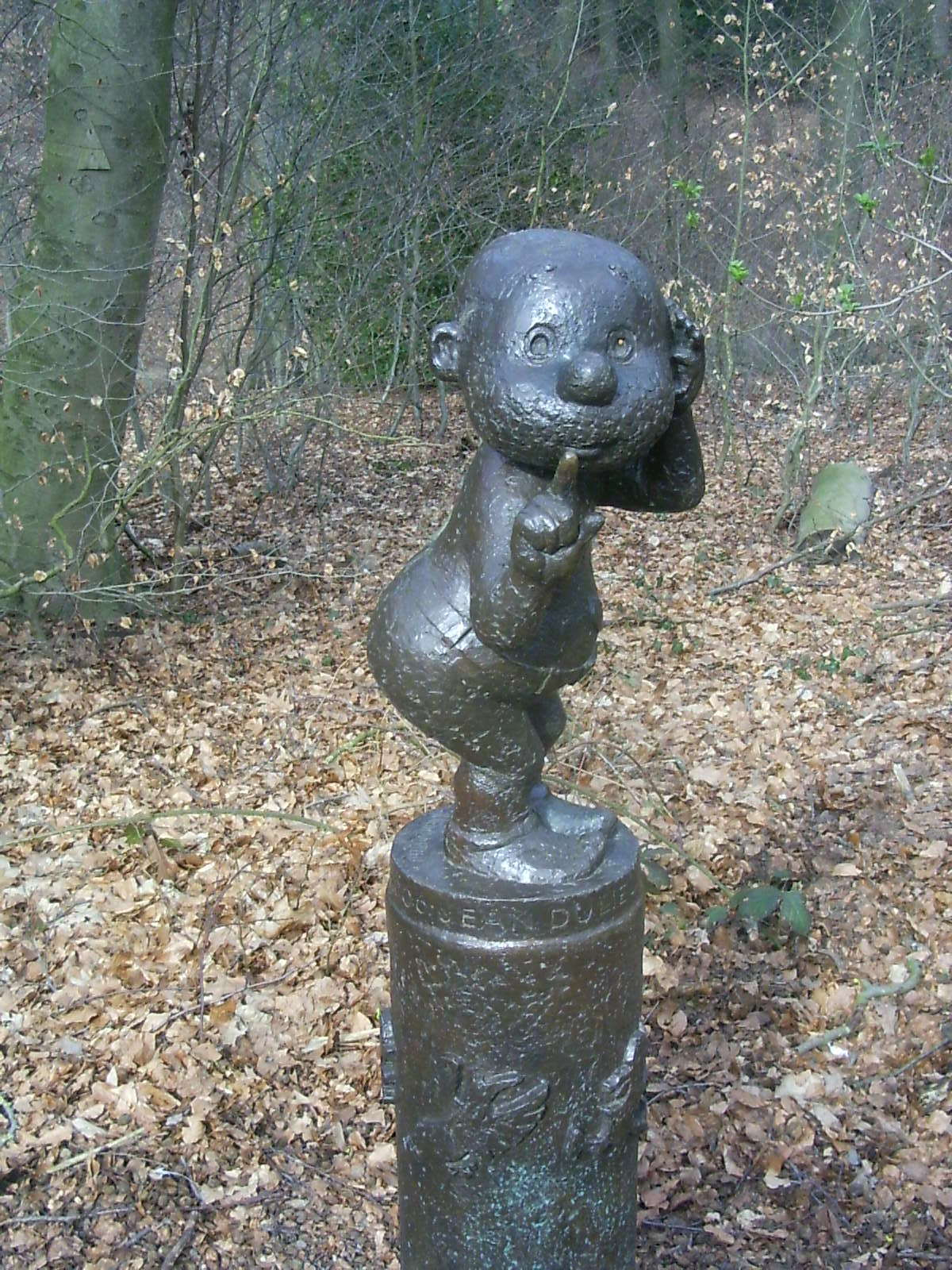
- Author(s): Jan van Oort, aka Jean Dulieu
- Current status/schedule: Terminated
- Launch date: February 2, 1946
- End date: 1984
- Genre: Fantasy comics

Paulus the woodgnome (Dutch: Paulus de boskabouter) was a Dutch newspaper comic strip, which ran between 1946 and 1984. Its popularity inspired a series of children's novels, a radio series and a television puppet series. It was created by Jan van Oort (pseudonym Jean Dulieu), who personally made all adaptations of his work. Paulus was translated into German, English, Swedish and Japanese.

== History ==
The first Paulus comic strip was published on February 2, 1946, in the Dutch newspaper Het Vrije Volk. Like most comic strips in The Netherlands at the time it was published in text comics format, with the text below the images. During the first 12 years nearly 3500 individual strips were written and drawn. Dulieu temporarily interrupted his comic strip in 1957 to focus more on his radio series adaptation of Paulus. After the show was cancelled in 1963 he continued making new comic strips until 1967–1968, when he focused on a new project: a TV puppet series. Between 1974 and 1984 Dulieu drew his final series of comics about Paulus.

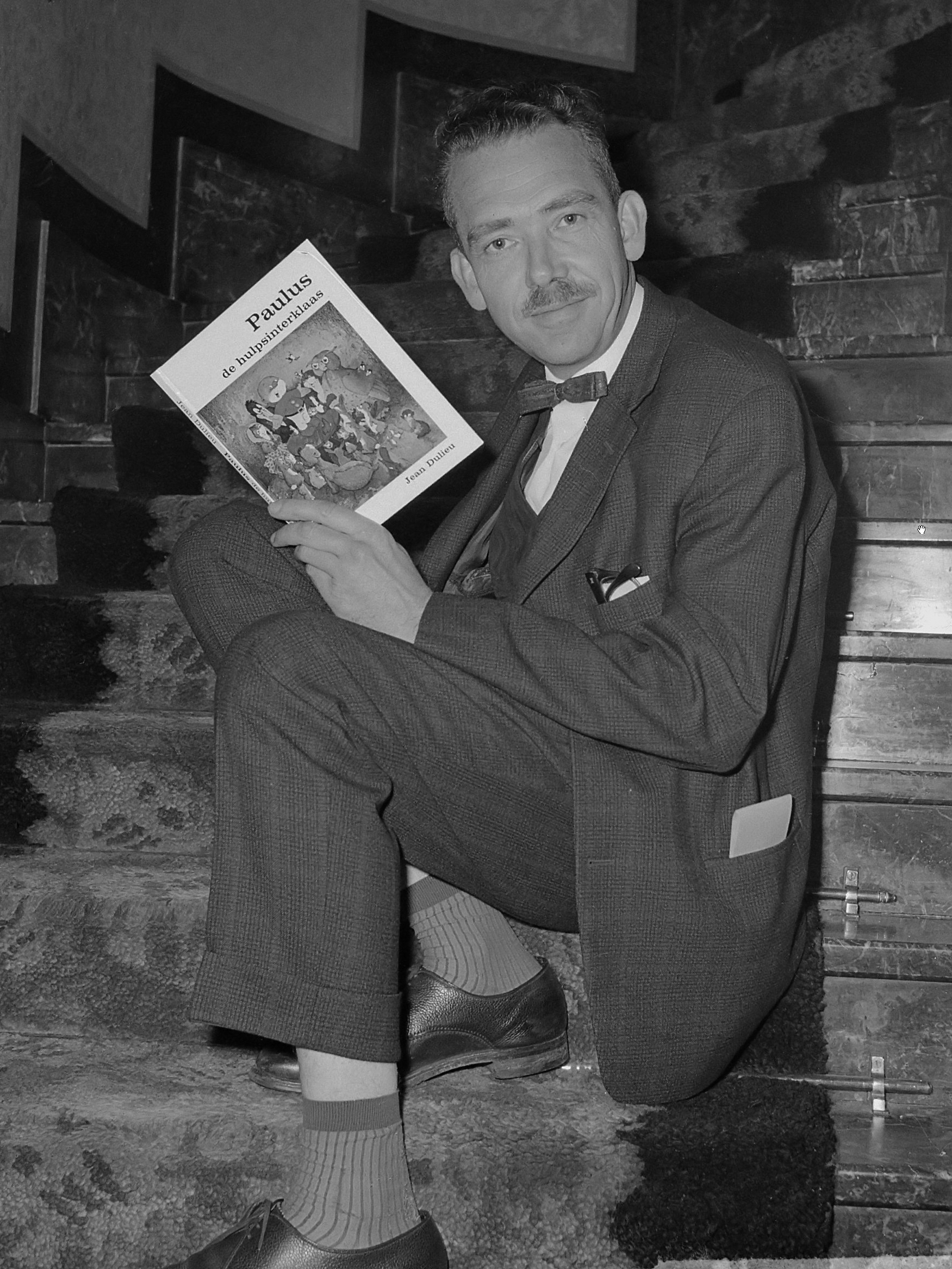
Jan van Oort, the creator of Paulus

Apart from Het Vrije Volk the comics were also published in magazines such as Kris Kras, Bobo, Avrobode and Eva.

== Storyline ==
Paulus is a gnome who lives in the woods. His friends are Oehoeboeroe (pronounced: "Oohoobooroo") the owl, Salomo the raven and Gregorius the badger. His archenemy is Eucalypta the witch and her assistant Krakras.

=== Characters ===
- Paulus: A nice, good natured wood gnome who is a friend of all nature and enjoys to smoke a pipe now and then.
- Oehoeboeroe: A wise owl who enjoys talking in archaic language. He is a good friend of Paulus, despite his love for eating mice.
- Gregorius: A greedy, lazy and not too bright badger. He frequently makes use of spoonerisms. He too is a friend of Paulus.
- Salomo: A wise raven who is another one of Paulus' friends.
- Eucalypta: An ugly and evil witch who is Paulus' arch enemy.
- Krakras: A crow who was transformed into a featherless chick by Eucalypta. She often assists her.
- Mol: A mole who often helps Paulus.
- Pluim: A squirrel and friend of Paulus.
- Wipper: A rabbit.
- Reintje: An evil fox, who is a threat to the other animals and often works together with Eucalypta.
- Poetepa and Moetema: A bear couple who have a little cub named Poetepoet, who ran away from home because he wanted to be big.

== Radio series ==
Between 1955 and 1964, Paulus de boskabouter was adapted for VARA radio as a series of audio plays. 900 episodes were made. Jean Dulieu did all the voices personally, except for Prinses Priegeltje, which was done by his daughter Dorinde van Oort. The theme music was "Dance of an ostracised imp" by Frederic Curzon. Several episodes were released on vinyl records and in the 2000s some were also made available on CD.

== Television series ==
Between October 1, 1967, and December 29, 1968, Paulus de boskabouter was made into a puppet series for VARA television. Dulieu made all the puppets himself and also provided the voices. Fred Bosman was the director. The series was exported to the United Kingdom, Australia, New Zealand, Canada Australia and Japan. The British dub was narrated by Arthur Lowe, with voices by Peter Hawkins and broadcast on ITV. It was produced by NTS Netherlands.

=== Episode list ===
- Oehoeboeroe and the Mouse
- The Falling Tree
- Visit from Pieter
- Breakfast for Paulus
- Clock 12
- Gregorius Fixes it Up
- In the Woods
- Professor Punt's Rolomobile
- Gregorius's Pitfall
- Sick Eucalypta
- Chinese Hat
- Paulus Sleeping
- The Witch Machine
- From an Oil Tie, an Oil Tie and Oil Eucalypta
- Careful in the Evening
- Whoever Sets a Snare for Another Falls into it Himself
- Playfighting
- Telling Tales
- Eucalypta's Fur Coat
- Angry Beasts in the Woods
- Bear Bedtime
- Go Ahead, Dig Again
- Paulus's Date
- Feeding Bugs
- Who Wants Carrots?
- A Strange Rabbit
- Japie the Unicorn
- The Miracle Stove
- Professor Punt and a Difficult Case
- The Vampire
- Paulus's Winter Supply
- Mushroom Soup
- The Tree Ghost
- Eucalypta's Birthday
- The Worrelsik
- A Beautiful Morning in the Woods
- Professor Punt's Smokemobile
- Eucalypta's Alarm Clock
- The Rabbit Wedding

From September 29, 1974, until May 31, 1975, a new puppet TV series about Paulus was made. This time the puppets were made by the Brothers Slabbers and the voices were done by professional actors, such as Elsje Scherjon, Frans van Dusschoten and Ger Smith, who also worked for De Fabeltjeskrant. Leen Valkenier wrote the scripts and Loek de Levita produced the show.

== Novelizations ==
During the 1970s Paulus was also published as a series of children's novels. From 2003 onward, De Meulder Publishers has published a new series of Paulus books, the so-called red books.

1. "The Hay Cage"
2. "The Log Plan"
3. "The Sparrows Job"
4. "The Heroic Mole"
5. "The Outdoor Schnaps"
6. "The Squat Birds"
7. "The Boo Trees"
8. "The Inventor"
9. "Acornities"
10. "The Snow Sniffer"
11. "The Fly Chicken"
12. "United We Stand"
13. "The Jumpsuit"
14. "The Trinity"
15. "The Bottle Man"
16. "The Annual Assembly"
17. "The Frog Bride"
18. "The Rooster Helmet"
19. "In Dire Straits"
20. "Snails' Talk"
21. "The Breton Beast"
22. "The Hats Party"

Further publications are forthcoming.
