= Willem Ritstier =

Dutch cartoonist

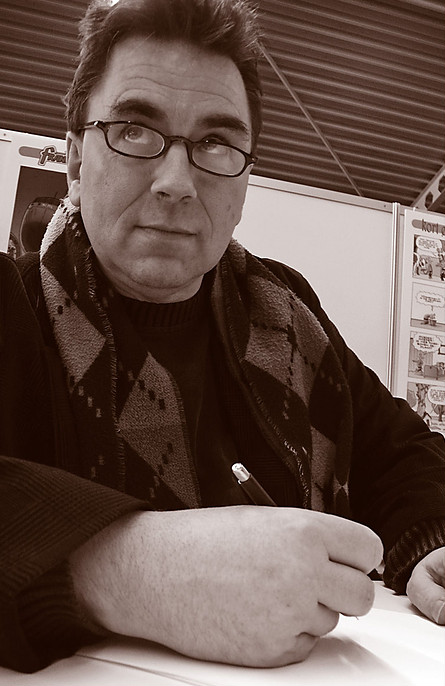
Willem Ritstier

Willem Ritstier (born June 12, 1959) is a Dutch comics artist. He is the winner of the 2017 Stripschapprijs. Ritstier has written one part of the Storm spin-off (The Exile of Thoem) which was published in Eppo.
