= Peter Pontiac =

Dutch cartoonist (1951–2015)

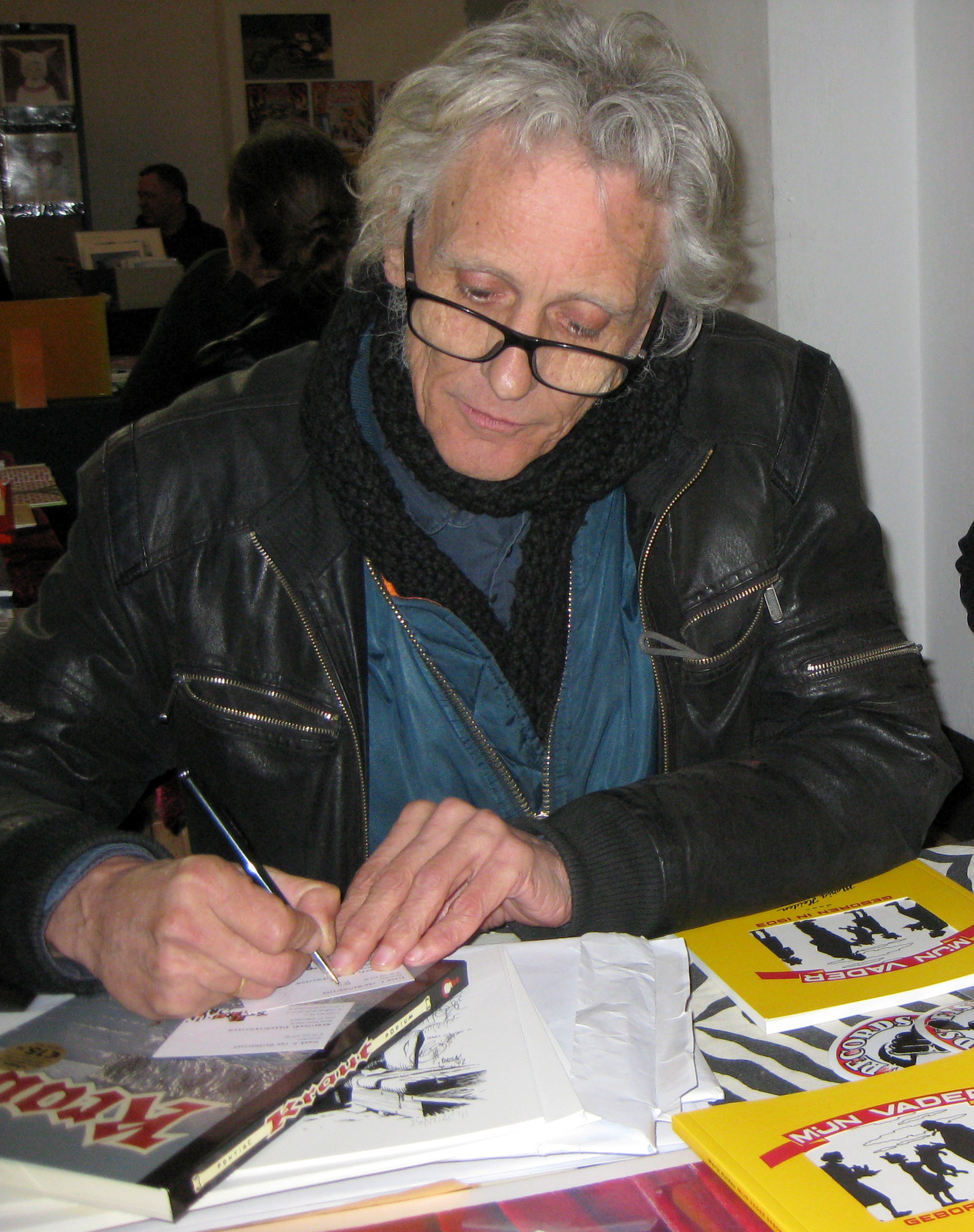
- Photo: Frank van Oortmerssen
- Born: Peter J.G. Pollmann; 28 April 1951 Beverwijk, Netherlands
- Died: 20 January 2015 (aged 63) Amsterdam, Netherlands
- Areas: Cartoonist, Artist
- Notable works: Kraut Biografiek; Requiem Fortissimo
- Awards: 2011 - Marten Toonderprijs; 1997 - Stripschapprijs

Peter Pontiac (born Peter J.G. Pollmann; 28 April 1951 – 20 January 2015) was a Dutch cartoonist, comics artist and illustrator. He was the winner of the 1997 Stripschapprijs. Pontiac died on 20 January 2015, after a lengthy battle with severe liver disease.

== Biography ==
He was known for leading a life in the fringe and was addicted to heroin for several years, something he drew autobiographical comics about as well. He illustrated various album covers for bands like Parados, Thud!, The Bouncers, The Schizofrenics, Dead Moon and bootleg singles by Lou Reed and Bob Dylan.

At the time of his death, Pontiac was working on a new graphic novel (STYX of de zesplankenkoorts) about his disease and awaiting death. He got money for this project through crowd funding.

== Lettering ==
For Oog & Blik he did the lettering of the Dutch editions of Art Spiegelman's Maus and Robert Crumb's Introducing Kafka.

== Bibliography ==
- 2011 - Rhythm, Oog & Blik (Complete collected comics 1969–2011, except Kraut)
- 2000 - Kraut Biografiek (Podium)
- 1998 - De ketens van kitsch (ISBN 90-801-821-0-9)
- 1998 - The Quick Brown Fax
- 1990-1997 - Pontiac Review (a series of 7 books) (Oog & Blik)
- 1997 - Lost in the Lowlands, self-published, 2nd printing Oog & Blik
- 1994 - De luchtgitaar (Meulenhoff)
- 1993 - The making of sacred pin-ups (Griffioen)
- 1990 - Requiem Fortissimo (ISBN 90-303-8941-9) (Oog & Blik)
- 1981 - Natural Jewboy (illustr.) (ISBN 90-70460-01-7)

== Awards ==
- 1997 - Stripschapprijs for his entire oeuvre
- 1998 - Professor Pi Illustrator's Prize from the city of Amsterdam
- 2011 - Marten Toonderprijs for his entire oeuvre
