= Maaike Hartjes =

Dutch cartoonist and comics artist

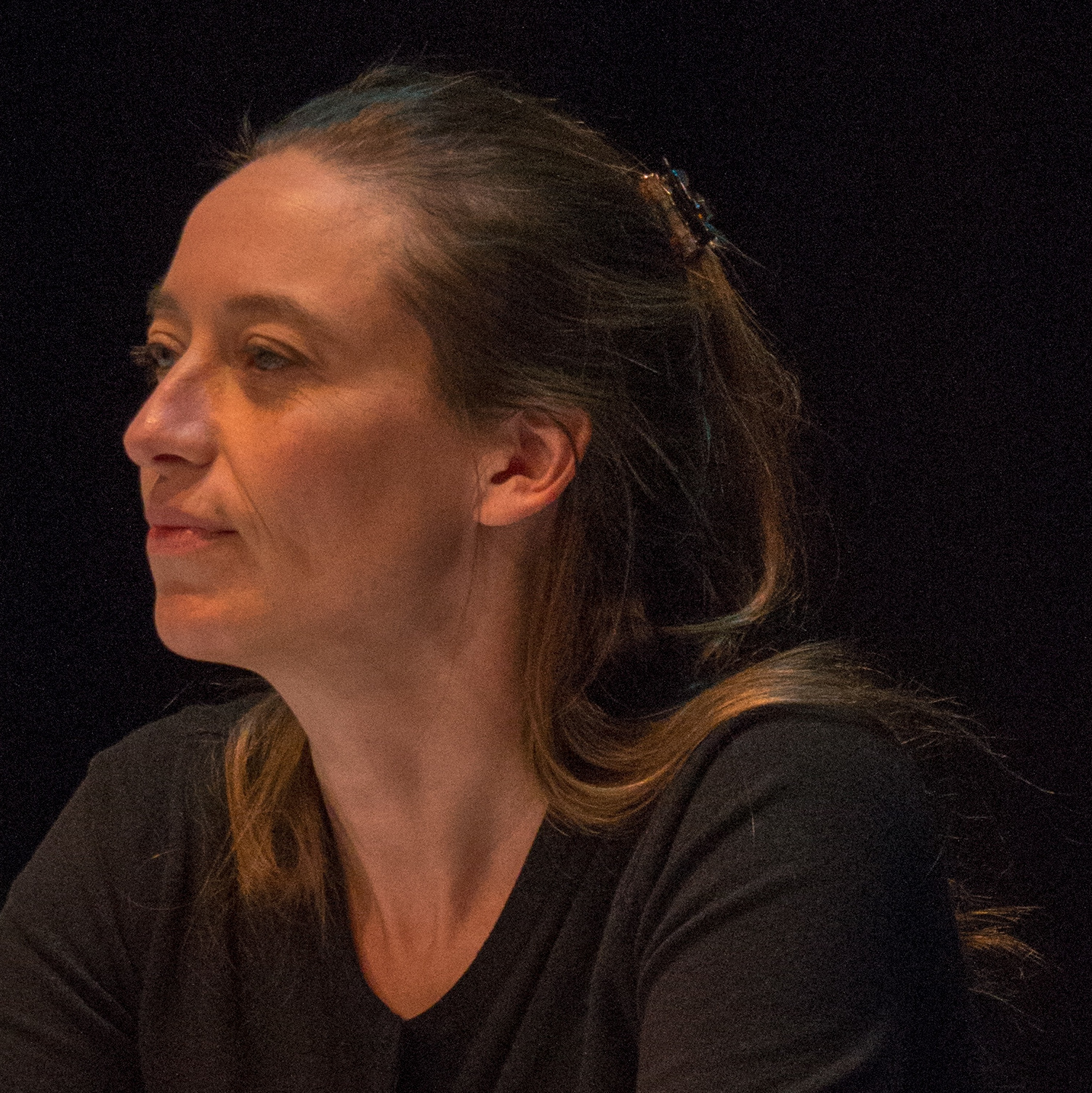
Maaike Hartjes

Maaike Hartjes is a Dutch cartoonist and comics artist. She is the winner of the 2016 Stripschapprijs.
