= Disappearance of Steven Cooper =

British man missing since 2008

Steven Cooper
- Born: 21 January 1961
- Disappeared: 21 January 2008 (aged 47); A86 road near Loch Laggan, Scotland
- Status: Missing for 18 years, 9 months and 19 days

On 21 January 2008, Steven Cooper, a 47‑year‑old former Territorial Army officer from Huddersfield, disappeared after leaving his home in Golcar and travelling to the Scottish Highlands. His car was found a week later near Loch Laggan, but extensive searches uncovered no trace of him. A receipt in the vehicle showed purchases made in Greenock on the morning he disappeared, although the whisky bottle listed on it was never found. Cooper was declared presumed dead in 2016, and his family have continued to appeal for information.

== Background ==
Steven Cooper was born on 21 January 1961 and lived in the Golcar area of Huddersfield, West Yorkshire. A former Territorial Army officer, he had Marfan syndrome, a rare genetic condition affecting connective tissue that made walking difficult, and he sometimes relied on a walking stick. Cooper had a partner and one child.

== Disappearance and aftermath ==
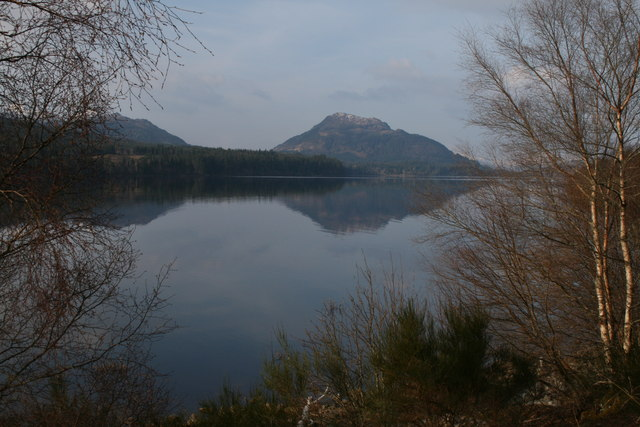
Loch Laggan from road

On 21 January 2008, his 47th birthday, Cooper is believed to have left his home in Golcar at approximately 3.40 am without taking his mobile phone, driving licence, passport, bank cards, or any spare clothing, and he left no note. Speed-camera footage recorded his blue Ford Focus travelling north on the A1 from London towards Edinburgh later that day. The vehicle was discovered a week later on a dirt track off the A86 between Kingussie and Spean Bridge, near Loch Laggan in the Scottish Highlands. A receipt from a Morrisons store in Greenock, timestamped 9.48 am on the day he disappeared, was found inside the car. It listed purchases of two bottles of soft drink, two muffins, two pre‑packed sandwiches, and a bottle of whisky. All the items listed on the receipt were found in the vehicle, including the cardboard tube in which the whisky had been sold, except for the whisky bottle itself, which was never recovered. His family questioned how he could have paid for the items, as he had left home without any money, and said they believed someone might know more about his disappearance.

A large‑scale search was undertaken by police and mountain‑rescue teams, supported by an RAF search helicopter and police dog units. The operation covered the shoreline of the loch and the surrounding hills, but no trace of him was found, and the search was formally concluded on 27 February. The loch itself was not examined until 2011, when underwater specialists and West Yorkshire Police divers searched the water, but no remains were located.

In 2016, a court ruled that Cooper was presumed dead.

In the years following his disappearance, Cooper's family have made several appeals for information.

== See also ==
- List of people who disappeared mysteriously (2000–present)
