= Jaap Vegter =

Dutch cartoonist

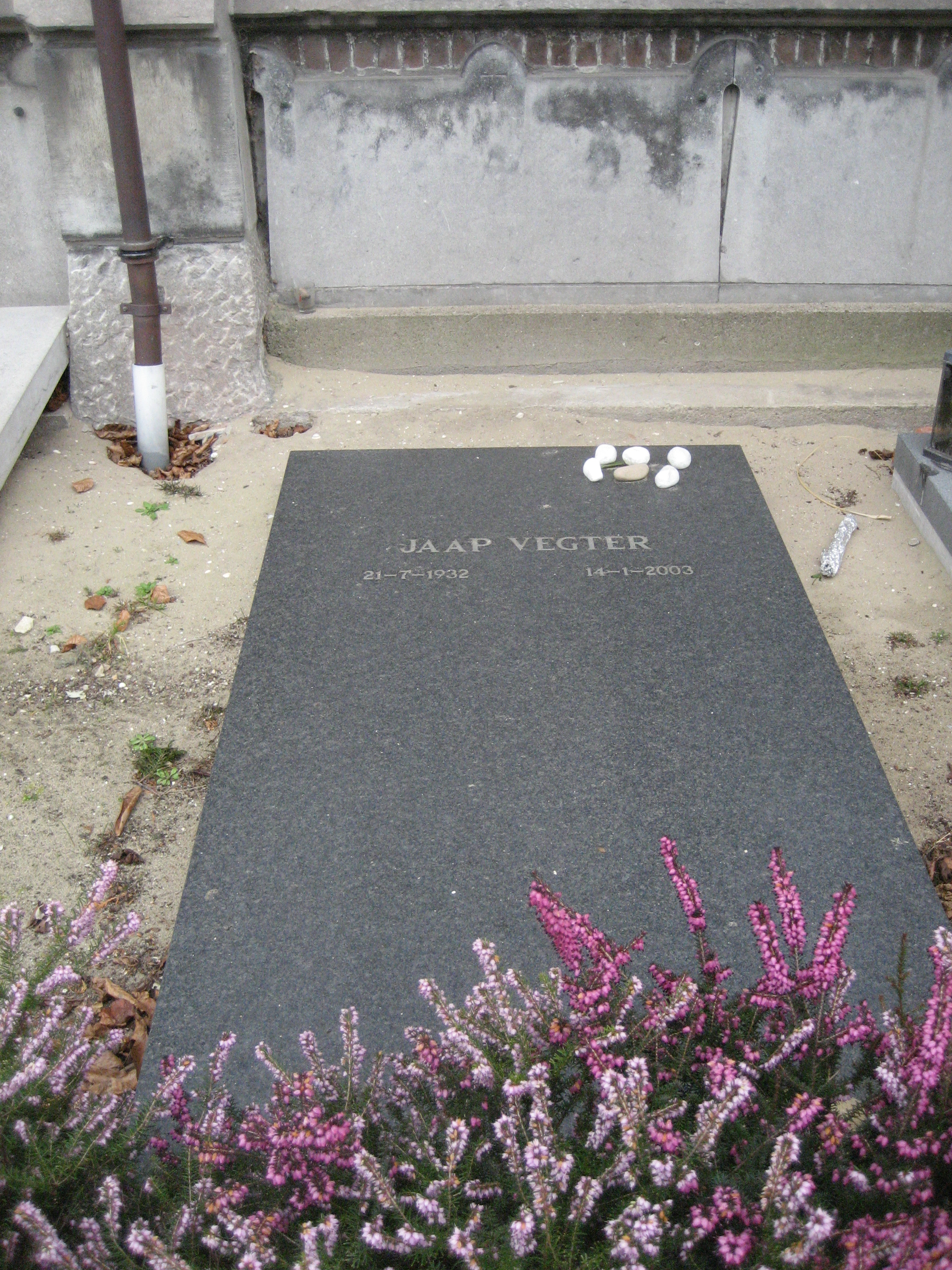
Tombstone of Jaap van Vegter, Begraafplaats Sint Petrus Banden, The Hague

Jacob Cornelis (Jaap) Vegter (21 June 1932, Voorburg - 14 January 2003, The Hague) was a Dutch cartoonist. He was the winner of the 1979 Stripschapprijs.
