= Marcel Ruijters =

Dutch cartoonist

Marcel Ruijters (born 3 July 1966) is a Dutch cartoonist and graphic novelist. He is the winner of the 2015 Stripschapprijs.
