= Stephen Cooper (writer) =

American editor and biographer

Stephen Cooper is an American editor, biographer and writer-producer. He is a professor of English at California State University, Long Beach, and has also taught for many years with the Writers' Program of UCLA Extension. He was born, raised, and lives in Los Angeles.

== Works ==
- Full of Life: A Biography of John Fante, North Point Press/FSG 2000; Angel City Press, 2005, ISBN 978-1-883318-58-1

=== Editor ===
- Perspectives on John Huston, G.K. Hall, 1994, ISBN 978-0-8161-1985-1
- John Fante: A Critical Gathering, co-edited with David Fine, Fairleigh Dickinson University Press, 1999
- The Big Hunger: Stories 1932-1959, Black Sparrow Press, 2000, ISBN 9781574231205
- The John Fante Reader (Ecco Press 2003); HarperCollins, 2003, ISBN 978-0-06-095948-7
- John Fante's 'Ask the Dust': A Joining of Voices and Views, co-edited with Clorinda Donato, Fordham University Press, 2020.

=== Writer-producer ===
- Struggle: The Life and Lost Art of Szukalski, Netflix Original Documentary, 2018.
