= Krimson =

- Publicity shot of Krimson, bending his cane, drawn by Willy Vandersteen in 1963

Publication information
- Publisher: Standaard Uitgeverij (Belgium)
- First appearance: Suske en Wiske: Het Rijmende Paard (1963).
- Created by: Willy Vandersteen

Krimson is a Flemish comic book character and the main antagonist in the Belgian comic strip series Suske en Wiske. He is a doctor, billionaire and supervillain who wants to take over the world.

== Debut ==
Krimson made his debut in the album "Het Rijmende Paard" ("The Rhyming Horse" (1962-1963), in which he appears as a cranky millionaire with his own private chauffeur who nearly runs Suske and Wiske over with his car while the children try to cross a forest path on horseback. Later he sends the owner of their manège a threatening letter, signing it too. It's here that the audience first learns his name. When Suske and Wiske tell Tante Sidonia and Lambik about Krimson Lambik happens to have heard from him. In fact, he panics and tells them "he is the biggest criminal in the world." Later in the story Krimson becomes the protagonists' major opponent when he tries to catch the Rhyming Horse to use it for smuggling, but is defeated when his plane crashes. In the same story Krimson's dependence on pills and butler Achiel are introduced.

Krimson's physical appearance was based on a man, Henri Vinoelst, who often visited the manège where Vandersteen's daughter was a regular customer. Initially he resembled Vinoelst so much that the man complained about being misrepresented. As a result, Vandersteen was forced to make him less recognizable by stylizing Vinoelst's features and giving Krimson a goatee.

Krimson returned in "De Sissende Sampan" ("The Hissing Sampan") (1963), where it turns out he exploits children in Hong Kong as child laborers on local papaver fields for drug trafficking. However, this is only revealed on the next to final page when he explains that he survived the plane crash in the previous story. He ends up in jail, but in the next story, "Het Zoemende Ei" ("The Buzzing Egg") (1964) he escapes and tries to gain the mysterious Buzzing Egg, an extraterrestrial artefact which crash landed in the Brazilian jungle. The Egg eventually turns out to be a robot who will solve all of man's conflicts on Earth and bring world peace. Krimson is so humbled that he gives the robot a bouquet, but it turns out to be a bomb. To him war means money and therefore he doesn't want world peace. Jerom is able to dismantle the bomb in the nick of time, but the robot melts because it can't take the Earth's temperatures. From this album on he became the series' most recurring antagonist.

== Biography and criminal record ==
Krimson was born in the fictional village Dievegem. He wanted to become a hero, but his father didn't support his dream, even when Krimson received his medical diploma. As a result, he decided to become the biggest criminal of all time. We get an impression of what he may have looked like as a child in "De Zeven Schaken" (1995).

Krimson runs a powerful and global criminal network. He employs many henchmen and has occasionally worked together with other recurring villains in the series, such as Savantas, De Zwarte Madam and professor Rosarius. He is mostly active in drug trafficking ("Het Rijmende Paard") ("The Rhyming Horse") (1963)), "De Sissende Sampan ("The Hissing Sampan") (1963)). He collaborated with Druon Antigoon in "De Zeven Schaken" (1995) and with weapon salesmen in "Kaapse Kaalkoppen" ("Baldheads from Kaapstad") (2004) to destroy a serum which can prevent people from xenophobia. Later stories often have him trying to steal certain magical objects, scientific inventions and/or treasures that he wants to use for his own personal gain.

Krimson favors world domination and has tried to gain it several times. In "De Kwaaie Kwieten" ("The Evil Weirdos") (1986) he attempts to gain all the communication satellites in the world. In "Het Enge Eiland" ("The Scary Island") (1999) he wants to force world governments to fulfill his demands or otherwise he'll use the Millennium Bug to dismantle the computer systems of all nuclear power plants in the world. In "De Kaduke Klonen" (2005) he tries to clone an army to invade other countries into submission. In "De Krimson-Crisis" ("The Krimson Crisis")(1988) Krimson succeeds in taking over the world and establishes a dictatorship. He is defeated in a large battle near the end of the story.

Krimson has resorted to enforcing child labor in "De Sissende Sampan" (1963) and is not above stealing objects or kidnapping people to fulfill his goals. He kidnapped Paul Geerts in "De Verdwenen Verteller" ("The Disappeared Narrator") (2002) and Tante Sidonia in "De Verwoede Verzamelaar" ("The Obsessive Collector") (2015). In "Krimsonia" (2012) he tried to give Tante Sidonia a potion to make her evil. In "De Spitse Bergen" ("The Steep Mountains") (2015) he wants to spread a gas that kills all plant life in the world.

In some stories Krimson merely wants to enlarge his fortune. In "Amoris van Amoras" ("Amoris of Amoras") (1984) by building apartment buildings in the medieval city of Amoras and trying to make the local cathedral collapse to make space. Krimson bought the second biggest mountain of the Alps in "De Begeerde Berg" ("The Desired Mountain") (1995) and wants to blow off the top of the Mont Blanc in order to own the highest mountain in Europe. In "De Ongelooflijke Thomas" ("The Unbelievable Thomas") (2000) he wants to use the micro-energetica of children to make older people younger again. He tries to steal the copyright of Suske en Wiske in "De Verdwenen Verteller" ("The Disappeared Narrator") (2002). He tries to sell an atomic aeroplane to international governments in "Het Machtige Monument" ("The Mighty Monument") (2008).

Krimson is often arrested near the end of the story, but always manages to escape from jail. Sometimes he is able to flee before anyone can stop him, usually taunting Suske, Wiske and their friends during his fleight by yelling: "Krimson always wins!"

In one story, "De Zwarte Tulp" ("The Black Tulip") (2014) he becomes temporarily cured of his evilness by drinking a serum extracted from a white tulip. However, since Krimson feels so much remorse for his past he is unable to eat, drink or sleep anymore. Fearing for his health Suske, Wiske and Lambik travel back in time to 1637 to find a black tulip as an antidote. At the end of the story Krimson's butler Achiel refuses to balance the white and black tulip serums out and only feeds his master the black serum, making Krimson evil again.

== Wealth ==
Krimson is rich enough to live in a mansion and have his own personal butler, Achiel, under his employ. He has access to helicopters and many other hi tech machinery. He dresses himself as a dandy: high hat, black coat and a cane.

== Nervous breakdowns ==
Krimson is easily agitated or unnerved and takes pills to calm him down. They are usually provided by his trusty butler Achiel who is ordered to quickly bring him his daily dose of pills. Krimson swallows a wide variety of pills, often for contradictive means such as calming down as well as make him feel happier again.

== Appearances in spin-off series ==
In Jerom and Amoras, two spin-off series of Suske en Wiske, Krimson is also a major antagonist.

== Appearances in other media ==
He was voiced by Wim Wama in the TV puppet series Suske en Wiske (1976). Contrary to his image in the comic books his puppet version acts more like a clumsy crook who constantly falls and trips over objects. He also operates alone, rather than with henchmen.

In the 1994 musical adaptation "De Stralende Sterren" Krimson's part was played by Guido Naessens in the Flemish version and Hans Wellens in the Dutch version.

In a card game based on Suske en Wiske, called "De Kaartendans", he fulfills the part of the joker.
