= 1945 in comics =

Notable events of 1945 in comics.

== Events and publications ==
=== Year overall ===
- Real Screen Funnies debuts with a Spring 1945 cover date. The title changes to Real Screen Comics with the second issue (Summer 1945) and features The Fox and the Crow and other Columbia-licensed talking animal characters. - (National Comics)
- Wim Meuldijk creates his newspaper comic Ketelbinkie, which will become so popular that it inspires its own magazine.
- After being cut off from the import of American comics and British comics during the Nazi and Fascist occupation of Continental Europe, the end of World War II brings a veritable boom about in the local comics industry of many European countries, particularly Italian comics, French comics and Belgian comics.

=== January ===
- January 8: The first episode of Moira Bertram's Jo is published.
- The first issue of the Belgian satirical comics and cartoons magazine Pan is published. It will run until April 2017.
- In the 52nd issue of Walt Disney's Comics & Stories, Li'l Bad Wolf makes his debut, the son of The Big Bad Wolf. The first story is drawn by Carl Buettner and written by Dorothy Strebe.
- Captain America Comics (1941 series) #44 - Timely Comics
- Daring Comics (1940 series) #10 - Timely Comics
- Marvel Mystery Comics (1939 series) #61 - Timely Comics
- Frozen Gold by Carl Barks, on Four Color.
- Following George Hager's death, The Adventures of Waddles is continued by his daughter Carol Hager and her husband Ray Carlson until 1953.

=== February ===
- All-American Publications gets its own logo.

=== March ===
- March 1: Debut of Marmaduke Mouse by Ernie Hart.
- March 11: The Flemish comics magazine Ons Volkske, whose publication was interrupted at the outbreak of World War II, reappears on the market.
- March 25: Debut of Bruce Gentry (1945-1951) by Ray Bailey.
- March 30: Willy Vandersteen publishes Rikki en Wiske in De Nieuwe Standaard. It's the first Suske en Wiske story and marks the debut of the characters Wiske, Schanulleke and Tante Sidonia, even though his editor renamed the character Suske into Rikki, without his knowledge or approval. After one story Vandersteen will remove Rikki from the series and replace him with the remodelled character Suske.
- Captain America Comics (1941 series) #45 - Timely Comics
- Marvel Mystery Comics (1939 series) #62 - Timely Comics
- Young Allies Comics (1941 series) #15 - Timely Comics
- The Long Race to Pumpkinburg, by Carl Barks, on Walt Disney's Comics and Stories.

=== Spring Issue ===
- Joker Comics (1942 series) #18 - Timely Comics

=== April ===
- All-Winners Comics (1941 series) #15 - Timely Comics
- Captain Aero Comics (1941 series) #22 - Helnit Publishing
- Captain America Comics (1941 series) #46 - Timely Comics
- Cat-Man Comics (1941 series) #27 - Helnit Publishing
- Green Mask (1945 series) #1 - Fox Feature Syndicate
- Human Torch Comics (1940 series) #18 - Timely Comics
- Marvel Mystery Comics (1939 series) #63 - Timely Comics
- Sub-Mariner Comics (1941 series) #16 - Timely Comics
- U.S.A. Comics (1941 series) #15 - Timely Comics

=== May ===
- May 11: In Chester Gould's Dick Tracy, Breathless Mahoney makes her debut.
- May 17: The Flemish newspaper De Zondagsvriend launches a children's supplement magazine, De Kleine Zondagsvriend, which will offer room for several comics series. It will run until 18 December 1963.
- The Icebox Robber, by Carl Barks in Walt Disney's Comics and Stories.
- The Riddle of the Red Hat, in Four Color comics, which is the only Mickey Mouse story drawn by Carl Barks.

=== June ===
- June 1: Debut of Valiant, le jeune patriote, weekly magazine for children published by the PCF; the first issue contains the first chapter of a comic about the French Resistance (Fifi, gars du maquis by Roger Lecureux and Auguste Liquois). The magazine also launches the humoristic comics Les Aventures de R. Hudi junior et de Nitrate by Eugene Gire and Placid et Muzo by José Cabrero Arnal.
- June 17: In Il vittorioso, the story Cip poliziotto (Cip detective) by Benito Jacovitti starts serialisation: the character Cip l'arcipoliziotto makes his debut.
- All-Winners Comics (1941 series) #16 - Timely Comics
- Captain America Comics (1941 series) #47 - Timely Comics
- Cat-Man Comics (1941 series) #28 - Helnit Publishing
- Marvel Mystery Comics (1939 series) #64 - Timely Comics
- Suspense Comics (1943 series) #8 - Continental Magazines
- Young Allies Comics (1941 series) #16 - Timely Comics

=== July ===
- The first issue of the Belgian comics magazine Wrill is published. It will run until May 1949.
- Captain America Comics (1941 series) #48 - Timely Comics
- Daring Comics (1940 series) #11 - Timely Comics
- Green Mask (1945 series) #2 - Fox Feature Syndicate
- Human Torch Comics (1940 series) #19 - Timely Comics
- Marvel Mystery Comics (1939 series) #65 - Timely Comics
- U.S.A. Comics (1941 series) #16 - Timely Comics

=== Summer Issue ===
- Joker Comics (1942 series) #19 - Timely Comics

=== August ===
- August 5: Debut of the Giles family (1945-1991) by Carl Giles in The Daily Express and Sunday Express.
- Captain Aero Comics (1941 series) #23 - Helnit Publishing
- Captain America Comics (1941 series) #49 - Timely Comics
- Cat-Man Comics (1941 series) #29 - Helnit Publishing
- Suspense Comics (1943 series) #9 - Continental Magazines
- The final issue of the Belgian comics magazine Franc Jeu is published.

=== September ===
- Green Mask (1945 series) #3 - Fox Feature Syndicate
- Marvel Mystery Comics (1939 series) #66 - Timely Comics
- Sub-Mariner Comics (1941 series) #17 - Timely Comics
- Young Allies Comics (1941 series) #17 - Timely Comics
- In Milan, the publishing house Audace, starts republishing after World War II interrupted their business. Tea Bonelli is the editor, her estranged husband Gian Luigi the writer and their thirteen-year old son Sergio the delivery and warehouse boy. Simultaneously, Gian Luigi Bonelli launches a new character in the magazine Il Cowboy: the Tarzanesque Yorga.

=== October ===
- October 7: In Il Vittorioso, the first chapter of Pippo in montagna (Pippo in the Mountains) by Benito Jacovitti is serialized. This is the first story starring the master criminal Zagar, antagonist of Cip.
- October 14: Disney comics: the first Uncle Remus and His Tales of Br'er Rabbit comics appear in print. Br'er Rabbit, Br'er Fox and Br'er Bear will remain recurring comics characters for decades to come.
- October 15: The first issue of the Dutch comics magazine Stripfilm is published. It also offers information about animation techniques, provided by the animation studio Stripfilm. The magazine will last until 23 November.
- October 19: The first episode of Olmo's gag comic Don Celes is published.
- October 22: The first episode of Phiny Dick's Olle Kapoen is published. Coen van Hunnik provides artwork but is later replaced by Richard Klokkers. The series will run until 15 November 1955.
- October 26: In the Italian Fulmine giornale the first chapter of La legione del mistero (The mystery legion) by Andrea Lavezzolo and Carlo Cossio is published, which marks the return of detective Dick Fulmine. Although he was previously at the service of Fascist propaganda he is now recycled as a democratic hero and cuts down a neo-Nazi gang, led by a revived Adolf Hitler.
- Belgian comics publisher Fernand Cheneval founds the first issue of the comics magazine Heroïc Albums. It will run until December 1956.
- In the French magazine Clic-Clac Images, Uderzo debuts as cartoonist with Flamberge gentilhomme gascon.
- Captain America Comics (1941 series) #50 - Timely Comics
- Daring Comics (1940 series) #12 - Timely Comics
- Human Torch Comics (1940 series) #20 - Timely Comics
- U.S.A. Comics (1941 series) #17 - Timely Comics

=== Fall Issue ===
- Joker Comics (1942 series) #20 - Timely Comics

=== November ===
- November 11: Godfried Bomans and Carol Voges publish De Avonturen van Pa Pinkelman (1945-1952) in De Volkskrant.
- November 12: Ray Gotto's Ozark Ike makes its debut.
- All-Winners Comics (1941 series) #17 - Timely Comics
- Captain Aero Comics (1941 series) #24 - Helnit Publishing
- Human Torch Comics (1940 series) #21 - Timely Comics
- Marvel Mystery Comics (1939 series) #67 - Timely Comics
- Sub-Mariner Comics (1941 series) #18 - Timely Comics

=== December ===
- December 11: Dutch comics artists Pieter Kuhn and Evert Werkman's first publish Kapitein Rob (1945-1966) in Het Parool.
- December 15: After a four-year interruption, due to the Fascist censure, the magazine Topolino returns to Italian newsstands. The same day, first issue of La Gazzetta dei piccoli (The little ones’ gazette), supplement for kids of Gazzetta del popolo.
- December 19: The story Op Het Eiland Amoras starts in De Nieuwe Standaard. This marks the first official Suske en Wiske story by Willy Vandersteen. New character Suske is already shown in the announcement strips, but will only make his official debut halfway the story when Wiske meets him at the Isle of Amoras. At the start of the story Professor Barabas also makes his debut.
- December 22: Willy Vandersteen's family gag comic De Familie Snoek makes its debut.
- December 27: Marc Sleen's series Piet Fluwijn introduces a new character, namely Fluwijn's son, Bolleke. From that moment on the series is renamed: Piet Fluwijn en Bolleke.
- December 27: Marten Toonder's Kappie makes its debut. It will run in the papers until 12 July 1972.
- Debut Millie the Model by Ruth Atkinson.
- Captain America Comics (1941 series) #51 - Timely Comics
- Cat-Man Comics (1941 series) #30 - Helnit Publishing
- Green Mask (1945 series) #4 - Fox Feature Syndicate
- Young Allies Comics (1941 series) #18 - Timely Comics
- All-American Publications decided to retire its own logo and replace it with the DC logo.
- The 18-years old Hugo Pratt debuts as cartoonist drawing the adventures of Asso di Picche, written by Alberto Ongaro and Mario Faustinelli
- In the magazine Valiant, debut of The Pioneers of Hope by Roger Lécureux and Raymond Poivet, the first significant French sci-fi comics.

=== Winter ===
- Suspense Comics (1943 series) #10 - Continental Magazines

== Births ==
=== March ===
- March 20: Arno van Dijk, Dutch comics artist and illustrator, (d. 2014).

=== July ===
- July 27: Justin Green, American cartoonist (Binky Brown Meets the Holy Virgin Mary), (d. 2022).

=== August ===
- August 17: Rachel Pollack, American comic book writer (Doom Patrol, New Gods), (d. 2023).

== Deaths ==
=== January ===
- January 3: Georges Colomb (Christophe), French botanist and comics artist (La Famille Fenouillard), dies at age 88.
- January 20: Federico Pedrocchi, Argentinian-Italian animator, comic writer (Virus, Il Dottor Faust, Zorro della Metropoli, Aeroporto Z, Capitan l'Audace, Saturnino Farandola) and artist (Disney comics, particularly Donald Duck, also worked for the magazine Il Corriere dei Piccoli and was founder of the magazine Paperino e altre avventure), dies in a bomb attack, at age 37.
- January 21: Eugène Damblans, aka Eugène Damblanc, Uruguayan-French painter and comics artist, dies at age 79.
- Specific date unknown: George Hager, American comics artist (continued Dok's Dippy Duck as The Adventures of Waddles), dies at age 59 or 60.

=== February ===
- February 13: Russell Keaton, American comics artist (Flyin' Jenny), dies at age 35 of acute melanoma.

=== March ===
- March 20: Johannes Franciscus Nuijens (Korporaal Achilles), Dutch teacher and comics artist (Het Rapport der Defensiecommissie toegelicht en eenigszins uitgebreid door Korporaal Achilles, De Toekomststaat (Een Nachtmerrie Fin de Siècle). Visioenen en Droombeelden uit de 20ste eeuw, Klacht van een Onderwijzer over De Vrije & Orde Oefeningen op de Lagere School and Aanleiding tot den Engelsch-Transvaalschen Oorlog), dies at age 78.
- March 31: Gaietà Cornet, Spanish caricaturist, illustrator and comics artist, dies at age 66.

=== April ===
- April 25: Jack Wilhelm, American comics artist (Meet the Misses, That Certain Party, Frank Merriwell's Schooldays), dies at age 42.
- April 30: Erich Schilling, German cartoonist, illustrator and comics artist, commits suicide at age 60.

=== June ===
- June 27: Harry James Westerman, American comic artist (The Dinkelspiels), dies at age 68.

=== September ===
- September 21: Moses Koenigsberg, American journalist, after whom the comics syndicate King Features was named, dies from a heart attack at age 67.

=== October ===
- October 23: Louis Moe, Norwegian-Danish illustrator and comics artist, dies at age 88.

=== November ===
- November 20: Loy Byrnes, American comic artist (Silly Willie, Spunkie, Punchy & Judy, continued Streaky, assisted on Nancy), dies at age 38 or 39.

=== December ===
- December 25: Oscar Jacobsson, Swedish comics artist (Adamson, known in English as Silent Sam), dies at age 56.
- December 29: André Hellé, French illustrator and comics artist, dies at age 74.
- December 30: Jack McGuire, American comics artist (Jane Arden, The Red Knight), dies at age 40.

=== Specific date unknown ===
- Marijan Ebner, Croatian comic artist (Pakleni Pronalazak), dies at age 36 or 37.
- Frank Holland, British comics artist (Those Terrible Twins), dies at age 73.
- Sebastijan Lechner, Yugoslavian comic artist, dies at age 23 or 24.
- Herbert Rothgaengel, German comics artist and illustrator, dies at an unknown age.

== First issues by title ==
- Green Mask Volume 2 (April) - Fox Feature Syndicate
- Patsy Walker (Timely Comics)
- Albi Uragano, (December), care of the so-called "group of Venice" (Alberto Omgaro, Dino Battaglia, Hugo Pratt) ; from the second number, it changes name in Asso di Picche (see over).
- Gazzetta dei piccoli (December 15), supplement to Gazzetta del popolo.

== Initial appearances by character name ==
- Black Adam in Marvel Family Comics #01 (December) - Fawcett Comics
- Monocle in Flash Comics #64 (April), created by Gardner Fox and Joe Kubert - DC Comics
- Superboy in More Fun Comics #101 (January), created by Jerry Siegel and Joe Shuster - DC Comics
- Turtle in All Flash #21 (September) created by Gardner Fox and Martin Naydel - DC Comics
