= List of comic and cartoon characters named after people =

This is a list of characters from animated cartoon, comic books, webcomics and comic strips who are named after people.

== Characters named after famous people ==
=== A ===
- Mayor Adam West in Family Guy, who is also dubbed by Adam West
- Alexander Lemming from The Beano – Scottish chemist Alexander Fleming
- Alexander Owlcott, a character in The Woods Are Full of Cuckoos – Alexander Woollcott
- Alister from the anime Yu-Gi-Oh! was named after Aleister Crowley in the dub version (the character's original name is Amelda).
- Alvida of the anime and manga series One Piece gets her name from the female pirate Awilda
- Ann-Margrock, a Flintstones character – Ann-Margret
- Apu Nahasapeemapetilon (The Simpsons) is named after Apu, the title character in The Apu Trilogy.
- Archimedes the owl (The Sword and the Stone) is named after ancient Greek mathematician Archimedes.
- Arnie Pie from The Simpsons – Ernie Pyle
- Arpine Lusène – Arsène Lupin, a fictional character from Maurice Leblanc
- Ax-hand Morgan of the anime and manga series One Piece is named for Henry Morgan, a Welsh privateer who made a name in the Caribbean as a leader of buccaneers.
- Attila the dog – (Belgian comic strip Attila) is named after Attila the Hun.
- Attila the dog – (Los Trotamúsicos) is named after Attila the Hun.

=== B ===
- Babbitt and Catstello, characters in A Tale of Two Kitties – Comedians Abbott and Costello
- Baby Crockett, from The Beezer comic – Frontiersman Davy Crockett
- Baby Face Finlayson, from The Beano comic – Criminal Baby Face Nelson
- Bakelandt (from the Belgian comic series Bakelandt) is named after 18th-century criminal Ludovicus Baekelandt.
- Professor Barabas – (Suske en Wiske) – Barabbas, the biblical thief
- Barbe Rouge (English name: Redbeard) is named after real-life pirate Hayreddin Barbarossa, who also had the nickname Redbeard.
- Barney Gumble – (The Simpsons) is named after The Flintstones character Barney Rubble.
- Bartholomew Kuma from the anime and manga series One Piece is named after Welsh pirate Bartholomew Roberts.
- Basil Hawkins from the anime and manga series One Piece is named after both English admiral Sir John Hawkins and English doctor Basil Ringrose.
- Bellamy the Hyena from the anime and manga series One Piece is named after Samuel Bellamy, a formidable pirate in the early 18th century.
- Betty Savis, a character in She Was an Acrobat's Daughter – Bette Davis
- Bing Crowsby, in The Woods Are Full of Cuckoos – Singer Bing Crosby
- Bogey Go Cart, a character in Bacall to Arms – Hollywood actor Humphrey Bogart
- Brutus (The Rescuers) is named after Roman senator Brutus.
- Bunny and Claude, villains from the Warner Bros.-Seven Arts era of Looney Tunes, are named after the notorious criminal couple, Bonnie & Clyde.
- Butch and Cassidy, villains from Pokémon – Criminal Butch Cassidy
- Buzz Lightyear from Toy Story – Astronaut Buzz Aldrin

=== C ===
- Calamity James from The Beano comic – Calamity Jane
- Calamity Jane from Lucky Luke – Frontierswoman Calamity Jane
- Calvin from Calvin and Hobbes – John Calvin, 16th-century theologian
- Markies de Canteclaer – (Tom Poes) is named after Canteclaer the rooster from Reynard the Fox.
- Capone Bege from the anime and manga series One Piece is named after Al Capone and William le Sauvage.
- Cary Granite, a Flintstones character – Hollywood actor Cary Grant
- Casey Strangle, a Flintstones character – Casey Stengel
- Cecil Crumey from Code Geass – Novelist Andrew Crumey
- Char Aznable (Mobile Suit Gundam through Char's Counterattack). Rumored to be named after French lounge singer Charles Aznavour.
- Chilly Willy – Actor Chill Wills
- Chuck, from Adolescent Radioactive Black Belt Hamsters – Hollywood actor Chuck Norris
- Clark Gravel, a Flintstones – Hollywood actor Clark Gable
- Clint, from Adolescent Radioactive Black Belt Hamsters – Hollywood actor Clint Eastwood
- Clo-Clo Pheip (The Adventures of Nero), named after the French singer Claude François, who was nicknamed Clo-Clo
- Cupidon, named after the Greek-Roman mythological character Cupid

=== D ===
- The Daltons (Lucky Luke) are named after the real-life 19th-century Dalton Gang.
- Darwin Watterson, from The Amazing World of Gumball – Biologist Charles Darwin
- Dewey, one of "Huey, Dewey and Louie" – U.S. politician Thomas Dewey
- Dick Fowl, a character in The Woods Are Full of Cuckoos – Dick Powell
- Dina Saur from Beany and Cecil. A singing dinosaur named after singer Dinah Shore
- Dio Brando is named after both Ronnie James Dio and Marlon Brando.
- Dole Promise, a character from She Was an Acrobat's Daughter – Lowell Thomas
- Donatello, the second youngest of the ninja turtle brothers from TMNT – the Italian Renaissance artist and sculptor, Donatello
- Donquixote Doflamingo from the anime and manga series One Piece is named after the a character from Spanish film of the same name Don Quixote.
- X. Drake from the anime and manga series One Piece is named after the famous English naval Vice Adm. Francis Drake, who was known as a pirate by the Spanish.
- Duck Dodgers, played by Daffy Duck, was named after famous character Buck Rogers.
- Duckula, named after Dracula
- Dumbo is named after 19th-century circus elephant Jumbo.

=== E ===
- Ed G. Robemsome, a character in Thugs with Dirty Mugs – Edward G. Robinson.
- Egroeg Sacul, Star Tours at the Disney's Hollywood Studios, named after Star Wars creator George Lucas. Egroeg Sacul is George Lucas spelled backwards.
- Empoleon from Pokémon – French emperor Napoleon
- Eustass Kid from the anime and manga series One Piece is named after the mercenary Eustace the Monk and the Scottish privateer William Kid.

=== F ===
- Fats Swallow, a character in The Woods Are Full of Cuckoos – Jazz musician Fats Waller.
- Foghorn Leghorn, Warner Brothers cartoons – Senator Claghorn, regular character on The Fred Allen Show.
- Francesca Lucchini from the anime Strike Witches, named after Italian World War 2 fighter pilot Franco Lucchini.
- Frankie Stein, from the Wham!, Shiver and Shake, Whoopee! and Monster Fun comics. – Frankenstein.
- Fred Bonaparte, from the game Psychonauts – his apparent ancestor, Napoleon Bonaparte.
- Fred McFurry, a character in The Woods Are Full of Cuckoos – Fred MacMurray.

=== G ===
- Gloria Von Gouten, from the game Psychonauts, named after the famous actor, Gloria Swanson.
- Goddard, the robot dog of Jimmy Neutron, is named for rocket scientist Robert Goddard.

=== H ===
- Hamlet – (Hagar the Horrible) is named after Shakespearean character Hamlet.
- Helga G. Pataki of Hey Arnold!, named after former NY governor George Pataki.
- Huey Freeman from The Boondocks is named after Huey P. Newton
- Huey, one of "Huey, Dewey and Louie" – Huey Pierce Long, American politician.
- Hitmonlee from Pokémon – Bruce Lee, martial artist
- Hitmonchan from Pokémon – Jackie Chan, martial artist
- Hobbes from Calvin and Hobbes – Thomas Hobbes, 17th century philosopher.
- Hohenheim of Light, from Fullmetal Alchemist – Paracelsus, sixteenth-century alchemist, whose real name was Theophrastus Van Hohenheim
- Hubert Farnsworth from Futurama – Inventor Philo Farnsworth
- Huckleberry Hound – Huckleberry Finn, The Adventures of Huckleberry Finn.

=== I ===
- Iago from Aladdin – Iago, William Shakespeare's play Othello.
- Ivy the Terrible – Russian czar Ivan the Terrible.

=== J ===
- Jack Bunny, a character in I Love to Singa – Jack Benny.
- Jackie, from Adolescent Radioactive Black Belt Hamsters comic book – Martial artist Jackie Chan.
- James Isaac Neutron from The Adventures of Jimmy Neutron, Boy Genius – Isaac Newton, English scientist, and James Chadwick, who was nicknamed "Jimmy Neutron".
- Jeffy Dahmer, of The Ringer – Serial killer Jeffrey Dahmer.
- Jerom, of Suske en Wiske – Jeroom Verten – Belgian playwright.
- Jessie and James, villains from Pokémon named after outlaw Jesse James.
- Jewelry Bonney from the anime and manga series One Piece is named after female pirate Anne Bonny.
- Jimmy Darrock, a Flintstones character – singer James Darren.
- John D. Rockerduck – Billionnaire John D. Rockefeller.
- Jules and Verne, the sons of Doctor Emmett Brown in Back to the Future: The Animated Series, are named after Jules Verne.

=== K ===
- Kangaskhan from some Western localizations of Pokémon – Genghis Khan, the Mongol Emperor
- The Koopalings are named after musicians.

=== L ===
- Lafayette (The Aristocats) is named after the French military officer Marquis de Lafayette.
- Laffite from the anime and manga series One Piece is named after French pirate Jean Lafitte.
- Lapras from Pokémon – Mathematician Pierre-Simon Laplace.
- Laurie Be Cool, a character in Bacall to Arms – Hollywood actress Lauren Bacall.
- Léonard the inventor is named after Italian scientist and inventor Leonardo da Vinci.
- Leonardo, the oldest of the Teenage Mutant Ninja Turtles – the great Italian Renaissance artist and scientist, Leonardo da Vinci
- Leo Ferocious, a Flintstones character – Baseball player Leo Durocher.
- Lester Coward, a character in She Was an Acrobat's Daughter – Actor Leslie Howard.
- Little Annie Fanny is named after comic character Little Annie Rooney.
- Louis the Alligator (The Princess and the Frog) is named after Louis Armstrong.
- Ludvig from Hey Arnold! – Composer Ludwig van Beethoven
- Ludwig Von Drake – Composer Ludwig van Beethoven.

=== M ===
- Marge Simpson (born Marge Bouvier) – Jacqueline Lee Bouvier Kennedy Onassis, former First Lady of the United States, widow to John F. Kennedy and Aristotle Onassis.
- Marshall D. Teach, Thatch, and Edward Newgate from the anime and manga series One Piece are named after Edward Teach, better known as Blackbeard, who was a notorious English pirate in the Caribbean Sea and western Atlantic during the early 18th century.
- Dr. Marvin Monroe (The Simpsons) is named after Hollywood actress Marilyn Monroe.
- Madame Medusa (The Rescuers) is named after Greek mythological character Medusa.
- Michelangelo, the youngest of the ninja turtle brothers from TMNT – the great Italian Renaissance artist and sculptor, Michelangelo Buonarroti.
- Milhouse Van Houten, a character on The Simpsons – Richard Milhous Nixon. Milhouse's middle name Mussolini is based on Italian dictator Benito Mussolini.
- Milton Squirrel, in The Woods Are Full of Cuckoos – Comedian Milton Berle.
- Morlocks – in Marvel Comics, a group of mutants naming themselves after the futuristic race in H. G. Wells' The Time Machine

=== N ===
- Nabuko Donosor (Urbanus) is named after Nebuchadnezzar II.
- Napoleon (The Aristocrats) is named after Napoleon Bonaparte.
- Nebby K. Nezzer from Veggie Tales is named after Nebuchadnezzar.
- Nemo from the movie Finding Nemo – Captain Nemo, fictional character in Jules Verne's novels Twenty Thousand Leagues Under the Seas and The Mysterious Island.
- Nero – Nero, Belgian comic character by Marc Sleen is named after the Roman emperor Nero.
- Nero (The Rescuers) is named after Roman emperor Nero.
- Nina Einstein from Code Geass – Albert Einstein

=== O ===
- Olga Lawina (Agent 327) is named after Dutch singer Olga Lowina.
- The Oracle of Delphius from the 1999 show Sonic Underground is named after the Oracle of Delphi from Greek mythology.
- Oscar from Cerebus – named after poet and playwright Oscar Wilde
- Owl Jolson, a character in I Love to Singa – Al Jolson

=== P ===
- Pepé Le Pew, French skunk in Warner Brothers cartoons – Pepe le Moko, fictional character from the franchise of the same name
- Philip J. Fry, from Futurama – Phil Hartman, voice actor
- Pluto, named after the dwarf planet Pluto, in itself named after Greek-Roman mythological character Pluto

=== R ===
- Raphael, the second oldest of the ninja turtle brothers from TMNT, was named after the Italian Renaissance artist and sculptor, Raphael Sanzio.
- Rasputin (Inspector Canardo) is named after Rasputin.
- Richard the Lion, from The Beano comic – English king Richard the Lionheart
- Rip Van Wink, from The Beano comic – Literary character Rip van Winkle
- Rock Lee from Naruto is named after martial artist Bruce Lee.
- Rock Quarry – Flintstones character named after actor Rock Hudson
- Roronoa Zoro from the anime and manga series One Piece is named after French pirate François l'Olonnais and fictional hero/vigilante Zorro.
- Rubberduck, comic book character from Captain Carrot and His Amazing Zoo Crew!, is the secret identity of actor Byrd Rentals, named after Burt Reynolds.

=== S ===
- Scrooge McDuck – Ebenezer Scrooge, fictional character in Charles Dickens' A Christmas Carol
- Seymour Skinner (The Simpsons) is named after psychologist B.F. Skinner.
- Sigmund (Dutch comics character) – Sigmund Freud, Austrian psychiatrist
- Sophie Turkey, a character in The Woods Are Full of Cuckoos – Sophie Tucker
- Stony Curtis, a Flintstones character – Hollywood actor Tony Curtis
- Sweeny Toddler, from the Shiver and Shake, Whoopee! and Buster comics – Literary character Sweeney Todd

=== T ===
- Thor (Marvel character) is named after the Norse god Thor.
- Tony Zucco – Rumored to be named after the actor George Zucco
- Trafalgar Law from the anime and manga series One Piece's last name Law is based on notorious English pirate Edward Low. His first name is from the Battle of Trafalgar.
- Troy McClure from The Simpsons – Actors Troy Donahue and Doug McClure
- Tycho Brahe, from Penny Arcade – Tycho Brahe, 16th-century astronomer

=== V ===
- Victor and Hugo (The Hunchback of Notre Dame, Disney film) – Victor Hugo, author of The Hunchback of Notre Dame
- Victor and Hugo, the Cosgrove Hall Films characters, are also named after the author.
- Virginia Wolfe, the mother of Heffer in Rocko's Modern Life, is named after the British author Virginia Woolf.

=== W ===
- W.C. Fieldmouse – Hollywood comedian W.C. Fields
- Wolfgang from Hey Arnold! – Composer Wolfgang Amadeus Mozart
- Woodhouse, the butler from Archer, is named after British author P.G. Wodehouse, who created the famous fictional butler, Jeeves
- Woody from Toy Story – American football player and actor Woody Strode

=== Y ===
- Yankee Poodle, comic book character from Captain Carrot and His Amazing Zoo Crew, is the secret identity of Rova Barkitt, named after gossip columnist Rona Barrett.
- Yensid, from Fantasia, after Walt Disney. Yensid is Disney spelled backwards.
- Yogi Bear – Baseball player Yogi Berra

=== Z ===
- Zippy the Pinhead is named after real-life sideshow artist Zip the Pinhead.
- Zorry Kid is named after masked avenger Zorro.

== Characters named after non-famous people ==
- Bugs Bunny from Looney Tunes – Ben "Bugs" Hardaway, storyboard artist
- Chang Chong-Chen – (The Adventures of Tintin) is named after a friend of Hergé, Zhang Chongren.
- Homer Simpson, Marge Simpson, Lisa Simpson and Maggie Simpson of The Simpsons are named after the family members of creator Matt Groening: his father Homer, his mother Marge and his sisters Lisa and Maggie.
- Garfield is named after Jim Davis's grandfather, James Garfield Davis (who is named after James Abram Garfield).
- Jeff Fischer, from American Dad!, is named after Seth MacFarlane's friend with the same name.
- Karen, from SpongeBob SquarePants, is named after and inspired by series creator Stephen Hillenburg's wife, Karen Hillenburg.
- Louie, one of "Huey, Dewey and Louie" – Louie Schmitt, animator
- Alvin, Simon, and Theodore (The Chipmunks), are named after the executives of their original record label, Liberty Records: Alvin Bennett (the president), Theodore Keep (the chief engineer), and Simon Waronker (the founder and owner).
- Timmy Turner from The Fairly OddParents – Timmy Hartman (younger brother of Butch Hartman)
- Charlie Brown and Linus, from Peanuts, were named after friends of Charles Schulz from Art Instruction Inc., where Schulz taught before and at the beginning of his career.
- Cree Lincoln, from Codename: Kids Next Door, is named after her voice actress, Cree Summer.
- Lois Lane, from the Superman comics, is named after Lois Amster, a girl who Jerry Siegel had a crush on.
- Bullwinkle J. Moose is named after Clarence Bullwinkel, a friend of Jay Ward and Alex Anderson, who created Bullwinkle. The J in his name is for his creator Jay Ward, as the J in Homer Simpson's middle name was Matt Groening's way of honoring Ward.
- Pocoyo, the main protagonist of the TV show Pocoyo, named after series creator David Cantolla's three-year-old daughter used it in her nightly prayers saying "Eres niño poco yo" ("You're a child little me") instead of "Eres niño como yo ("You're a child like me").
- Super Zia (from Toothpique Productions' series of the same title) is named after the actor playing him, a friend of the director's, Ziauddin Md. Nasrullah.
- Erfaan a.k.a. Mr. 85 (from Toothpique Productions' Super Zia) is named after a friend of the director's girlfriend.
- Shinji Ikari from Neon Genesis Evangelion is named after Shinji Higuchi, head of Gainax, the animation studio of Evangelion.
- Kirby is named after lawyer John Kirby, who defended Nintendo in the Universal City Studios, Inc. v. Nintendo Co., Ltd. case in 1984.
- Porky Pig from Looney Tunes is named for two childhood classmates of creator Friz Freleng, nicknamed "Porky" and "Piggy".
- Mario is named after Nintendo of America's former warehouse landlord Mario Segale.
- The American Dennis the Menace is named after the comic strip creator Hank Ketcham's son Dennis Ketcham, whom the artist's wife once called "a menace".
- Eek! the Cat was named after one of co-creator Savage Steve Holland's deceased pet cats.
- Monica was named after Mauricio de Sousa's daughter, Mônica Sousa, when she was just 3 years old.
