= Professor Barabas =

- Publicity shot of Professor Barabas. Drawn by Willy Vandersteen.

Publication information
- Publisher: Standaard Uitgeverij (Belgium)
- First appearance: Suske en Wiske: Het Eiland Amoras (1945).
- Created by: Willy Vandersteen

Professor Barabas (English: Professor Barnabas) is a Flemish comic book character from the Suske en Wiske series by Willy Vandersteen. He is the absent-minded professor/scientist archetype in the franchise.

== History ==
In the first unofficial Suske en Wiske story, Rikki en Wiske in Chocowakije (1945), Wiske, Rikki and Tante Sidonia are aided by an absent-minded engineer called Ingenieur Wargaren. Vandersteen never used the character again, but he can be seen as a prototype of Barabas. Professor Barabas made his debut in the next and first official Suske en Wiske story, Het Eiland Amoras ("The Isle of Amoras") (1945). Wiske and Tante Sidonia meet him at the beach, after Wiske accidentally hit his head with a vase. Barabas turns out to be a professor who invented a large helicopter named the Gyronef, which allows them to travel to the isle of Amoras to solve a mystery. The earliest version of Barabas differed a lot from later appearances. In "Het Eiland Amoras" he is very obese and has a stutter. After complaints from parents that their children imitated Barabas' stuttering, his stutter was 'healed'.

== Character ==
Barabas is a good friend of the protagonists. They frequently ask for his help whenever they have a complicated problem that only his scientific knowledge can solve. Barabas' many inventions often drive the plot forward, despite the fact that he doesn't always play a huge role in the stories. In many cases he stays at home, especially when the characters time travel with his "teletijdmachine" ("tele time machine"), because he has to control the machine. Only in a few stories does he play a central role. In "De Gouden Cirkel" ("The Golden Circle") (1960) Barabas gets contaminated with radiation, causing his friends to travel across the entire globe to get him proper medicine. In "Beminde Barabas" ("Beloved Barabas") (1974) Barabas searches for a girl he loved when he was younger, but later lost contact with.

Barabas is generally a good-natured, if somewhat absent-minded person. He enjoys playing pranks on his friends now and then by keeping his inventions a secret until their curiosity gets the better of them or by disguising himself. Only when the others bother him while he is busy does Barabas get angry. He can also get quite furious when his inventions are vandalized or misused. Barabas is also aware of his huge responsibility as a scientist. In "De Sprietatoom" ("The Tiny Atom") (1947) he destroys his entire laboratory out of fear it will be misused by foreign military powers and becomes a poet. In "Barabas de Balorige" (2013) he destroys everything again, but travels to the past instead, "when times were more simple.". In "De Snorrende Snor" ("The Purring Moustache") (1957) Barabas creates a huge scheme involving robots who threaten to destroy the world, only to bring the world a message of love instead.

Barabas' name is obviously inspired by the biblical character Barabbas.

== Family background ==
In "De Zeven Schaken" (1995) we see Barabas during his youth. He is raised by his stern, rich father who wants him to speak French and study. According to "De Hellegathonden" ("The Hellhounds") (1986) Barabas' great-grandfather was a crook who was preoccupied with occult magic. He felt remorse, however, and changed his life for the better. Another 19th-century forefather of Barabas was Geronimous Jabbertalk, who was a scientist in London.

In "De Beminde Barabas" (1974) we learn that, as a young student, Barabas fell in love with a female tailor.

Despite being an innovative scientist Barabas was so poor in "Het Zingende Nijlpaard" (1950) ("The Singing Hippo"). that he was forced to sell his inventions. By "De Glanzende Gletsjer" ("The Gleaming Glacier") (1986) his reputation is such that he is elected "Inventor of the Year".

== Inventions ==
Barabas has invented many machines and vehicles, which often come to good use to Suske, Wiske, Lambik, Tante Sidonia and Jerom. Among the most recurring are:

- De teletijdmachine ("The tele time machine"). Barabas' most famous invention. It was introduced in "Het Eiland Amoras", but only to view images from the past on a screen. From "De Tuf-Tuf-Club" (1952) the device is built into a huge machine which is able to teleport people to previous centuries or bring them to the present. Whenever the cast has to travel to a previous time period they use the tele time machine. In "De Duistere Diamant" ("The Dark Diamond") (1958) Barabas creates a bracelet with the same function. In "De Zeven Snaren" ("The Seven Strings") (1967), "Lambik Baba" (1991) and "Het Verdronken Land" ("The Drowned Country") (1999) a portable version of the machine is introduced.
- The Gyronef. A huge helicopter, introduced in "Het Eiland Amoras" ("The Isle of Amoras") (1945).
- The Terranef. A vehicle able to travel underground, introduced in "De Knokkersburcht" ("The Batterer's Castle") (1953)
- Vitamitje. A small anthropomorphic car, suitable for Suske and Wiske to drive with. It was introduced in "De Sprietatoom" ("The Tiny Atom") (1946).
- De Klankentapper ("The Noises Transmitter"). A machine which enables people to listen and communicate with plants and objects.

== In popular culture ==
In the 1976 puppet TV series Cees van Oyen provided the voice of Barabas' puppet. In the 1994 musical "De Stralende Sterren" Alex Wilequet played the part of Barabas. In the 2004 live-action film De duistere diamant Tuur De Weert played the part. Pierre Bokma provided the voice of the same character in the animated adaptation Luke and Lucy: The Texas Rangers (2009).

In the Belgian Comic Strip Center in Brussels the permanent exhibition brings homage to the pioneers of Belgian comics, among them Willy Vandersteen. In the room dedicated to his work a replica of Professor Barabas' teletijdmachine ("tele time machine") can be seen.
