= Kees Boot =

Dutch actor (born 1970)

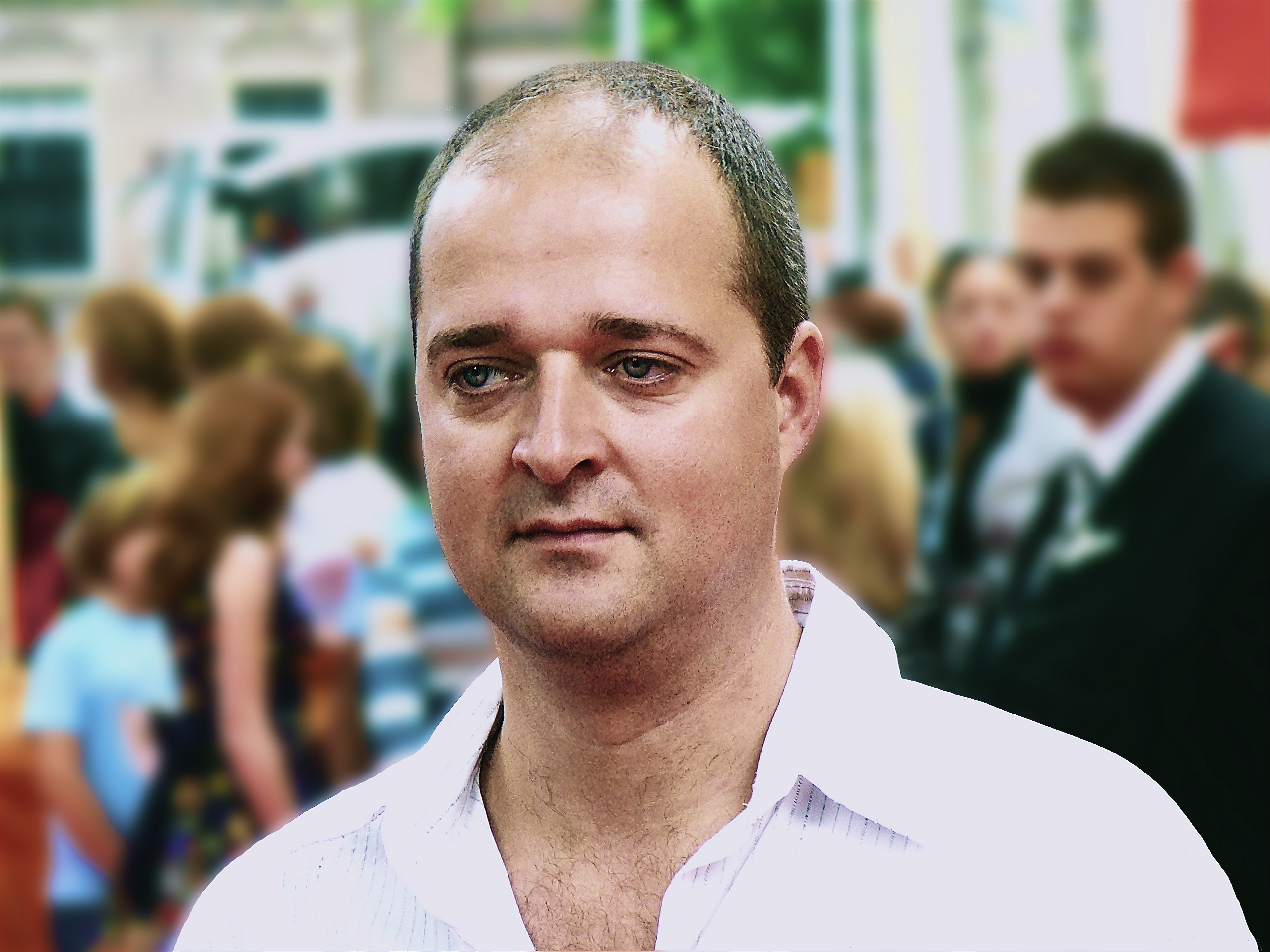
- Born: 26 March 1970 (age 56)
- Occupation: Actor

Kees Boot (born 26 March 1970) is a Dutch actor. He is known for playing roles in many films, television series and theatrical productions.

== Career ==
Early in his career, Boot became known for playing the role of 'John the manager' in a Cup-a-Soup commercial and for playing Johnny in the television series All Stars. He also appeared in the 1999 film Mates, the 2007 film Moordwijven, the 2008 film De Brief voor de Koning and the 2013 film The Price of Sugar. In 2011 and 2012, he played the role of Leo in the television series SpangaS. He also played roles in the television series Baantjer, De afdeling, Overspel and Flikken Rotterdam. In 2009, he voiced the character of Jerom in the comedy adventure film Luke and Lucy: The Texas Rangers. In 2010, he appeared as police officer in the dark comedy horror film Sint.

In 2013, Boot appeared in the fifteenth season of the reality television show Expeditie Robinson. In 2019, he appeared in the speed skating television show De ijzersterkste presented by Toine van Peperstraten.

In 2020, Boot appeared in Detective Van der Valk, a Dutch remake of the British television series Van der Valk. In 2021, he played the role of traitor in the television game show De Verraders.

In 2022, he appeared in the musical 14 de musical about Dutch footballer and manager Johan Cruyff. Since 2022, he plays the role of general practitioner in the soap opera Goede tijden, slechte tijden. In 2024, he plays a role in the war musical 40-45.

== Awards ==
In 2003, he won the Arlecchino award (for best male supporting actor) for his role in the play Popcorn by Ben Elton.
