= Luke and Lucy: The Texas Rangers =

2009 film

- Belgian theatrical release poster
- Directed by: Mark Mertens; Wim Bien
- Written by: Dirk Nielandt; Guy Mortier; Eric Wirix
- Based on: Spike and Suzy by Willy Vandersteen
- Produced by: Eric Wirix
- Starring: Lucas Van Den Eynde; Chris Van den Durpel; Alex Wilequet; Filip Peeters; Sien Eggers; Staf Coppens; Evelien Verhegge
- Cinematography: Eric Wirix
- Edited by: Mark Mertens; Wim Bien
- Music by: Ian Marien
- Production companies: Skyline Entertainment; CoBo Fonds; AVRO; Studio Vandersteen; Standaard Uitgeverij; Cotoon Studio; Flanders Audiovisual Fund (VAF); LuxAnimation
- Distributed by: Kinepolis Film Distribution (Belgium); Bridge Entertainment Group (Netherlands)
- Release dates: 21 July 2009 (Belgium); 23 July 2009 (Netherlands)
- Running time: 86 minutes
- Countries: Belgium; Netherlands; Luxembourg
- Language: Dutch
- Budget: €9 million
- Box office: €237,500

Luke and Lucy: The Texas Rangers (original title Suske en Wiske: De Texas Rakkers, also released as Spike and Suzy: The Texas Rangers) is a 2009 animated western comedy adventure film released on 21 July 2009 in Belgium. It was the first of a projected 13 animated Luke and Lucy films, at an intended rate of one per year, though no further films were made. The film is based on the Belgian comic book characters Luke and Lucy (published in English as Spike and Suzy and Willy and Wanda). The film is directed by Mark Mertens and Wim Bien, and produced by Skyline Entertainment, in partnership with CoToon, LuxAnimation, BosBros, and WAT Productions. The film was first announced in a 1 July 2005 press release. The Flanders Audiovisual Fund announced on 20 April 2006 that it would provide €12,500 for script development, and a further €237,500 was announced in September 2007 for production of the film. The total budget of the film is €9 million, making it the most expensive Flemish-Belgian film to date.

== Plot ==
Luke and Lucy find out that a masked villain called Jim Parasite has kidnapped and shrunk all the Texas Rangers. They leave for Dark City, Texas with their friends and settle in the Texas Rangers' HQ. It quickly becomes clear that they are not welcome. Parasite terrorizes the city and has spies everywhere. Saloon dancer Miss Missy decides to join Luke and Lucy, but Aunt Sybil doesn't trust her and suspects that she is secretly in cahoots with Parasite. Is she jealous of Ambrose and Wilbur's interest in Miss Missy. Luke and Lucy don't trust the Sheriff or the grocer, Theodore, who acts suspiciously. After a confrontation with Parasite, Luke and Lucy realize that the Sheriff's cast is fake, and they discover that a closet in Miss Missy's hotel room is filled with weapons. Who is the real culprit?

== Cast ==
| Character | Original (Flemish) voice | English dub | Dutch dub |
|---|---|---|---|
| Suske | Staf Coppens | Guilherme Apollonio | Marijn Klaver |
| Wiske | Evelien Verhegge | Chloe Dolandis | Nanette Drazic |
| Lambik | Lucas Van Den Eynde | Gregg Weiner | Frank Lammers |
| Tante Sidonia | Sien Eggers | Sally Bondi | Raymonde de Kuyper |
| Jerom | Filip Peeters | Ken Clement | Kees Boot |
| Professor Barabas | Alex Wilequet | Todd Durkin | Pierre Bokma |
| Sheriff Cooper | Bruno Vanden Broecke | Billy Ray Cyrus | Jeroen van der Boom |
| Miss Missy | Lien Van de Kelder | Aubrey Shavonn | Jennifer Mary Hoffman |
| Bill Buster | Peter Van Gucht | Scott Genn | Dennis van der Geest |
| Jules | Guy Mortier | Barry Tarallo | Guy Mortier |
| Ranger Tom | Axel Daeseleire | James Keller | Xander de Buisonjé |
| Theofiel/Theodore Boemerang | Chris Van den Durpel | Dave Dreisin | Jeroen van Koningsbrugge |
| Rik | Peter Van Den Begin | Paul Homza | Daniël Boissevain |
| Manuel | Stany Crets | Carlos Alayeto | Javier Guzman |

== Production ==
On 14 January 2009, it was announced that Mark Mertens and Wim Bien would direct a 2009 Belgian-Luxembourgish-Dutch animated western comedy adventure theatrically released film titled Luke and Lucy: The Texas Rangers which would be released in cinemas on 21 July 2009 in Belgium and 23 July 2009 in the Netherlands. Eric Wirix would produce and write the movie with the budget of €9 million. Dirk Nielandt and Guy Mortier would also write the movie. It was also announced that Frank Lammers, Kees Boot, Jeroen van Koningsbrugge, Pierre Bokma, Raymonde de Kuyper, Marijn Klaver and Nanette Drazic would star in the movie. Bridge Entertainment Group acquired distribution rights to the film. Ian Marien would compose the music for the movie. Skyline Entertainment, CoBo Fonds, Algemene Vereniging Radio Omroep (AVRO), Studio Vandersteen, Standaard Uitgeverij, Cotoon Studio, Flanders Audiovisual Fund (VAF) and LuxAnimation would also produce the movie. The movie's soundtrack contains "Land of Milk and Honey" performed by The Flying Carrots and Arno, "Yellow Rose" performed by Maurane & Beverly Jo Scott, "Bad Girl" performed by Beverly Jo Scott and "Dat Ben Jij" performed by Jim Bakkum.

== Release ==
The film was theatrically released on 21 July 2009 by Bridge Entertainment Group and was released on DVD and Blu-ray on 22 February 2011 by Bridge Entertainment Group.

== Soundtrack ==
- Land of Milk and Honey - The Flying Carrots feat. Arno
- Yellow Rose – Maurane & Beverly Jo Scott
- Bad Girl – Beverly Jo Scott
- Dat Ben Jij – Jim Bakkum

== See also ==
- List of animated feature-length films
- List of computer-animated films
- Spike and Suzy
