= Tante Sidonia =

Publication information
- Publisher: Standaard Uitgeverij (Belgium)
- First appearance: Suske en Wiske: Rikki en Wiske in Chocowakije (1945).
- Created by: Willy Vandersteen

Tante Sidonia is a Flemish comics character from the Belgian comics series Suske en Wiske. In the franchise she is the aunt of Wiske and the adoptive aunt of Suske, of whom she both takes care.

In the original Flemish publications her name was Sidonie, while the translations in the Netherlands named her Sidonia. After the series changed to Algemeen Beschaafd Nederlands in 1964 the character was changed to her definitive name Sidonia. She even announces this to the readers at the start of the album "De Nerveuze Nerviërs" ("The Nervous Nervii") (1964). In English translations of the series, she has been called Aunt Agatha, Aunt Sidonia, and Aunt Sybil.

== Character ==
Tante Sidonia is Suske and Wiske's guardian. Willy Vandersteen created her because, according to him, "a real mother would never allow her children to go on adventure like Suske and Wiske do". Despite that Sidonia still protects and defends them at all cost.

Sidonia is an older, bespectacled woman who is thin and tall. (about 5'11") She has a large chin, big nose, a huge quiff and big feet. Because of her unattractive physical features she is frequently mocked by other characters, especially Lambik. One of the most frequently uttered insults are comparisons between her and a coat stand. One of the running gags is that she often throws her shoe against the back of Lambik's head after he insulted her. Understandably, Sidonia feels very insecure about her appearance. During trips she often takes large trunks full with beauty measures along with her. In "De Jolige Joffer" ("The Jolly Joffer" (1986) she changes her face with a magical spell to become more attractive. In "Het Babbelende Bad" ("The Talking Bath") (2008) she visits a plastic surgeon.

Sidonia is a spinster. She often tries to seduce other men, especially Lambik whom she secretly loves. In "De Lachende Wolf" ("The Laughing Wolf") (1952) she says she wouldn't go to Canada if Lambik asked her hand in marriage, a plea he ignores. In "Sjeik el Rojenbiet" ("Sheik Rojenbiet") (1963) Lambik imitates Ramon Novarro and tells Sidonia "I love you", which she takes seriously until he tells her he was only joking. In "De Poenschepper" ("The Money Shoveler") (1963) it is revealed that she built a secret shrine for Lambik, who has been missing for several months. While her love for Lambik remains unrequited - as stipulated in Vandersteen's testament - her search for a partner has sometimes been fruitful, but either the men turn out to be villains or her love for Suske, Wiske and her friends gets the upper hand.

Sidonia is very bright. In several stories she comes up with ingenious plans to solve complicated problems and uses her slender body to good use. In "De Straatridder" ("The Street Knight") (1955) she hides herself completely behind a street light, while she startles a burglar in "De Lachende Wolf" ("The Laughing Wolf") (1952) by crawling up the stairs in snake-like fashion. She is also a master of disguise, as demonstrated in "De Stierentemmer" ("The Bull Tamer") (1950), "De Sissende Sampan" ("The Hissing Sampan") (1963) and "De Apekermis" ("The Monkey Fair") (1965).

Still there are times when Sidonia's emotions get the better of her. When she takes her glasses off this is usually a sign that she is about to get incredibly angry. She also has frequent nervous breakdowns where she starts screaming and jumps backward. Usually her entire body paralyzes or curves in the shape of a bow. In some stories she has to be calmed down with a mustard foot bath, smelling salts or a quick hospital visit.

== History ==
Tante Sidonia debuted in the first unofficial Suske en Wiske story, "Rikki en Wiske in Chocowakije" (1945), where she is already shown as Wiske's guardian. She adopts Suske in the next story Het Eiland Amoras ("The Isle of Amoras") (1946).

In some older stories she is notably absent, but in other stories, such as "De Botte Botaknol" (1980-1981), "De Kattige Kat" (1984-1985), "De Flierende Fluiter" (2004-2005), "De Hippe Heksen" (1983) and "De Europummel" (2001-2002) she plays a central role. She is also a main character in the spin-off series Jerom and Amoras.

While normally being a housewife Sidonia sometimes performs jobs. In "De Zwarte Zwaan" ("The Black Swan") (1958) she is a guide during the Brussels World's Fair in 1958. In "Beminde Barabas" ("Beloved Barabas") (1974-1975) she works as a plumber.

== Family ==
Sidonia's father is a moustached man, which explains his nickname "De Snor" ("The Moustache"). In "De Snorrende Snor" ("The Purring Moustache") (1957) he lives in with Sidonia. In "De Tijdbobijn" ("The Time Bobbin") (2009) he moves in the castle of the Van Zwollem family. In "De Lachende Wolf" ("The Laughing Wolf") (1952) we learn that her nephew, John, became a fur trapper in Alaska and is married with a Native American woman, Big Snowbell. Sidonia's niece, Carmencita Falasol, is a Spanish operasinger who is married with inventor Don José del Rondello, with whom she has a toddler son, Sprotje.

Sidonia is of ancient noble ancestry. In "De Koning Drinkt" ("The King Drinks") (1947) we learn that a medieval woman who shares a physical resemblance to her was a royal warrant holder. At the end of the story she marries the king. In "De Stierentemmer" ("The Bull Tamer") (1952) the mayor of the fictional Spanish town Servela tells Sidonia that she is related to the Duke of Medina Sidonia, who was a real 16th century Spanish duke. Even in the 19th century Sidonia still has nobility in her family. In "De Tuf-Tuf Club" (1951) we get to know baron van Stiefrijke, another great-grandfather of her. Her grand aunt Eulalie van Stiefrijke, however, had serious debts, according to "Het Lijdende Leiden" ("The Suffering Leiden") (2011).

== In popular culture ==
On June 15, 1995, an illustrated wall was dedicated to Suske and Wiske in the Laekenstraat in Brussels, Belgium. Sidonia is also seen on this wall.

In the 1975-1976 Dutch TV puppet series Suske en Wiske Sidonia's voice was done by Trudy Libosan. In the 2004 live-action film "Luke and Lucy: The Texas Rangers" she was voiced by Sien Eggers.

In live-action films and plays Sidonia is often portrayed by male actors rather than female. In the 1994 theatrical musical "De Stralende Sterren" ("The Blinking Stars") she was portrayed by Aimé Anthoni, in the 2002 musical "De Spokenjagers" ("The Ghost Hunters") (2002) by Jeroen Maes and in the live-action film De duistere diamant ("The Dark Diamond") (2004) by Peter Van Den Begin. The only female actor to play the part so far was Wanda Joosten.

In the Dutch educational comic strip series Van Nul tot Nu (1982), which tells the history of the Netherlands in comic book form, Alonso Pérez de Guzmán, 7th Duke of Medina Sidonia is caricatured as Tante Sidonia as a nod to Suske en Wiske.
