= Mônica Sousa =

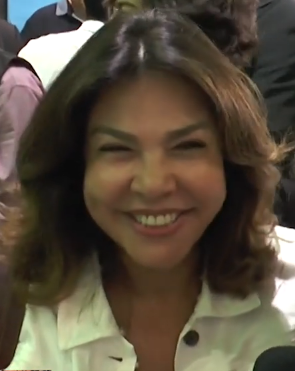
- Born: Mônica Spada e Sousa; September 28, 1960 (age 65); Bauru
- Occupations: Entrepreneur executive director of msp
- Years active: 1978-today
- Known for: Inspiration of the character Monica.

Mônica Spada e Sousa (September 28, 1960) is an entrepreneur, executive director of Mauricio de Sousa Produções (MSP) and inspiration of her father, Mauricio de Sousa, for the creation of the character Monica, of the Monica and Friends.

== Childhood ==
Mônica Sousa was born in Bauru, daughter of designer and entrepreneur Mauricio de Sousa and Marilene Spada. She is the second daughter of the couple, who were also parents of Mariângela, Magali and Mauricio Spada, who died in 2016. In 1963, when she was two and a half years old, her father created the character for Folha de S. Paulo, inspired by some traits of personality and the daughter's appearance: slightly toothy, short, fat and quarrelsome, besides carrying a stuffed rabbit, but of yellow color. The idea of creating a female character came after a journalist colleague of Mauricio said that the creator was misogynist, because he created only male characters. The character's debut took place on March 3, 1963, in the Folha de S. Paulo Ilustrada section.

Monica would discover herself to be the inspiration of the character at the age of 7 or 8, after a schoolmate told her that she was the character of the comic strips of Folha, which made her curious, and had her doubt confirmed by her father, but her acceptance was quick.

== Career ==
At the age of 18, she started working at the Monica and Friends park store, became interested in sales, and moved to the commercial department some time later, being currently the sales executive director of Mauricio de Sousa Produções.

Together with UN Women, Monica made a commitment to increase the influence of Monica and Friends to encourage female autonomy in girls of various ages, and created the Donas da Rua project in 2016. In 2017 she received the title of advisor to the Winning Women project, from EY Entrepreneurial Winning Women Brazil and was one of the winners of the 12º Prêmio Excelência Mulher 2016 (12th Women Excellence Award 2016).
