= Paul Geerts =

Flemish comics artist

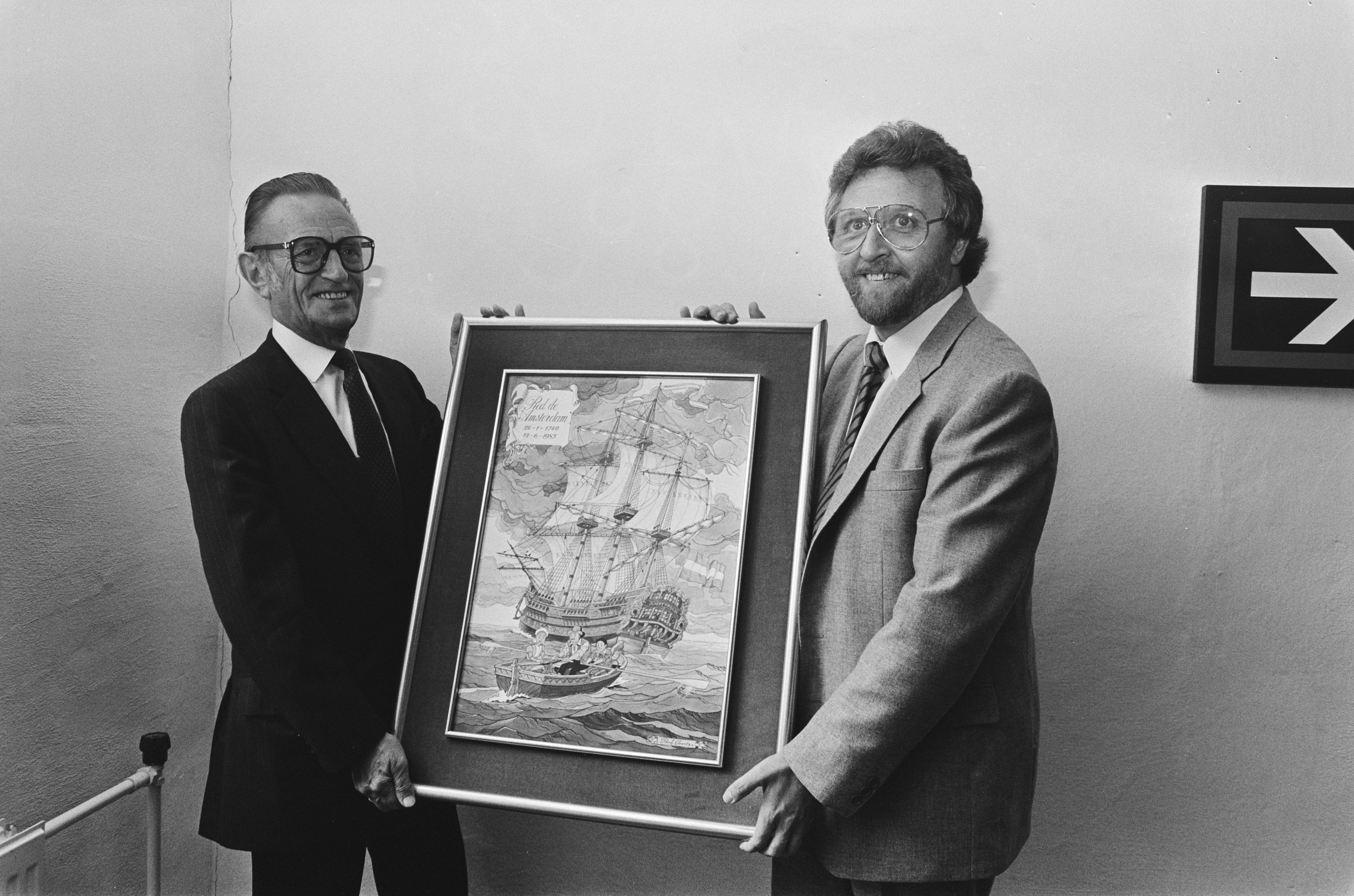
- Vandersteen & Geerts (1985)
- Born: Paulus Josephus Coleta Geerts; 16 May 1937 (age 89) Turnhout, Belgium
- Areas: Writer, Artist
- Notable works: Spike and Suzy
- Awards: full list

Paul Geerts (complete name Paulus Josephus Coleta Geerts) (born 16 May 1937) is a Flemish comics artist who succeeded Willy Vandersteen as the main artist of the Spike and Suzy series.

== Biography ==
Born in Turnhout, his parents moved to Antwerp a few years after his birth, looking for employment. He was taught drawing by his father and as a child entered the youth organisation Chiro Flanders. He later joined the Royal Academy of Fine Arts. After three and a half years of drawing lessons, he made the transition to the painting class. However, his father could not afford the painting materials. Geerts decided to quit the academy and to apply for a job with the experience he had.

At the age of sixteen Geerts went into military service, after which he found various jobs. He drew the comic strips De Chirowietjes and De melkweglopers, which appeared in a number of Chiro magazines in the mid-1960s.

Halfway through 1967 he decided without an appointment, with a self-drawn comic strip, to visit Willy Vandersteen in order to possibly get his dream job here. Vandersteen agreed and hired him, and Geerts started working in Studio Vandersteen in early 1968, a drawing team of 26 people at the time.

=== Spike and Suzy ===
In 1971, after working in the drawing team for three years, Paul Geerts decided he would write his own comic strip for the German weekly Stern. Vandersteen, who had heard of his future plans, asked him if he would like to take over Spike and Suzy from him later on. Geerts agreed, and in 1972 he wrote his first screenplay for a Spike and Suzy story, De gekke gokker. He was the main artist of Spike and Suzy from 1971 until 2002.

== Bibliography ==
- Vaessen, Theo "Paul Geerts: Dertig jaar peetvader van Suske en Wiske", Standaard Uitgeverij, Uitgeverij Van Holleema en Warendorf, (2005) ISBN 9002219474 (in Flanders), ISBN 9077692215 (in the Netherlands).
