= Wiske =

Belgian comic strip character

Publication information
- Publisher: Standaard Uitgeverij (Belgium)
- First appearance: Suske en Wiske: Rikki en Wiske in Chocowakije (1945).
- Created by: Willy Vandersteen

Wiske (English: Wanda, Suzy, Bobette, Lucy) is one of the main characters in the popular Belgian comic strip Suske en Wiske by Willy Vandersteen. She is the girl of the duo. Together with Lambik she is one of the most popular characters in the franchise.

== History ==
Wiske made her debut in the very first Suske and Wiske story "Rikki en Wiske in Chocowakije" (1945) ("Rikki and Wiske in Chocowakije"). Her companion in this story is her older and stronger brother Rikki, who was written out of the series at the start of the next story "Het Eiland Amoras" (1945-1946) ("The Isle of Amoras"). When Wiske travelled to the isle of Amoras along with Tante Sidonia and Professor Barabas she met Suske there, who took Rikki's place as her male companion.

Wiske is adopted by her aunt, Tante Sidonia. It is never directly implied, but just like Suske she is likely an orphan, as her parents are never seen around.

Vandersteen named Wiske after the Flemish opera singer Wiske Ghijs. Her real name is "Louisa", but this is hardly used in the series. The nickname "Wiske" is a Flemish diminutive form of "Louisa".

== Character ==
Contrary to Suske, Wiske is more flawed as a person. She is stubborn, prone to anger and jealousy, too curious for her own good and can be vain, disobedient, lazy and impulsive. However, she still has a heart of gold. Her impulsiveness and curiosity often bring her and others in trouble. This also explains why more stories center around her than the good-natured Suske. Just like Lambik Wiske is a popular characters in the franchise because readers can relate to her human flaws.

== Relation with Suske ==
Suske and Wiske are best friends, despite quarreling once in a while. One of the recurring storylines is Wiske's jealousy whenever Suske receives attention from other young, attractive females.

== Schanulleke ==
Wiske has a little doll, Schanulleke, whom she carries along with her wherever she goes. She adores her doll so much that she is heartbroken whenever it is lost or someone threatens to destroy it.

== Wiske's story-concluding wink ==
Wiske in her trademark winking pose, which concludes every story

Wiske traditionally concludes every story by winking at the audience, which has become a trademark of the franchise.

== In spin-offs ==
Suske plays the central role in the spin-off series Amoras. The first volume is named after him. He is also the central character in the junior version Klein Suske en Wiske ("Little Suske and Wiske").

== In popular culture ==
Both she and Suske have their own statue in the Antwerp Zoo in Antwerp. It was sculpted by René Rosseel in 1978. They also have a statue in Middelkerke, sculpted by Monique Mol in 2002.

On 15 June 1995 an illustrated wall was dedicated to Suske and Wiske in the Laekenstraat in Brussels, Belgium.

Suske and Wiske are also part of an illustrated wall in the Korte Ridderstraat 8 in Antwerp, which was revealed on 13 May 2006. On 24 April 2009 a similar wall was revealed in Kalmthout.

In the 1975-1976 Dutch TV puppet series Suske en Wiske Wiske's voice was done by Helen Huisman.

In the 1994 musical "De Stralende Sterren" Hilde Vanhulle played the part of Wiske. In the 2002, musical "De Spokenjagers" Wiske was played by Femke Stoop. Liesbeth De Wolf played Wiske in the 2008 musical "De Circusbaron".

In the 2004 live-action film De duistere diamant Céline Verbeeck played Wiske. In the 2009 3-D animated feature film Luke and Lucy: The Texas Rangers Evelien Verhegge played Lucy (Wiske).
