= Schanulleke =

Flemish comic book character

Publication information
- Publisher: Standaard Uitgeverij (Belgium)
- First appearance: Suske en Wiske: Rikki en Wiske in Chocowakije (1945).
- Created by: Willy Vandersteen

Schanulleke is a Flemish comic book character, originally named 'Schalulleke' and then 'Schabolleke', who originated in the Belgian comics series Suske en Wiske. In the series she is Wiske's beloved rag doll. Between 1986 and 1993 Schanulleke received her own spin-off series. The character's name in English is Molly, Sawdust or Muffin.

== History ==
Schanulleke was introduced in the very first panel of Suske en Wiske, along with her owner Wiske, namely in the album Rikki en Wiske in Chocowakije (1945). Her original name was "Schalulleke", later changed into "Schabolleke" for publication in the Netherlands, both Flemish dialect expressions for a scallion. When it was later decided to use one translation for both the Netherlands and Flanders her name was changed again from "Schalulleke" to "Schanulleke". Guido Lauwaert, who worked at Standaard Uitgeverij, wrote in a 2018 memoir that the editor of the publishing house, Maarten van Nierop, changed the name to "Schabolleke" since the former name contained the word "lul" (Dutch-language slang for penis). According to Lauwaert, the slang was not an everyday word in Flanders during the 1970s, however van Nierop altered the name to appeal to the Dutch market. The name change became official in the Suske en Wiske story "De Schone Slaper" ("Sleeping Beau") (1965).

== Character ==
Schanulleke is a little rag doll, always portrayed wearing a red dress, indicating it is female. Wiske loves her with a passion and treats her like a mother. She is always heartbroken whenever Schanulleke is kidnapped, lost or threatened. Whenever people mock her for loving a doll at her age she feels insulted.

In some stories the kidnapping of Schanulleke brings the plot into motion, like "Prinses Zagemeel" ("Princess Sawdust") (1949), "De Knokkersburcht" ("The Batterers' Fortress") (1953) and "De Laatste Vloek" ("The Last Curse") (2002). She is also brought to life in "Bibbergoud" (1950), "De Sterrenplukkers" (1952), "Het Vliegende Bed" (1959), "De Dulle Griet" (1966), "De Poppenpakker" (1973), "De Vlijtige Vlinder" (1976), "Sony-San" (1986), "De Mysterieuze Mijn" (1990), "Amber" (1999), "De Kus van Odfella" (2003) and "De Gevangene van Prisonov" (2003).

Despite being an inanimate object and usually not being the focus of the stories, Schanulleke is still one of the few characters in the franchise who has been present in most of the stories.

== Spin-off ==
From 1986 until 1993 Schanulleke received her own comic strip. The first two stories, "Eiko, de wijze boom" and "Schanulleke in de dierentuin" were drawn by Willy Vandersteen himself and were long stories. He also gave her a sidekick: the clown doll Duddul. Later his studio employees, Eric De Rop and Patty Klein, continued the series, but as a gag-a-day comic. The series have been published in Okki and Suske en Wiske Weekblad.

=== List of Schanulleke albums ===
- "Eiko, de wijze boom"
- "Schanulleke in de dierentuin"
- "Kattekwaad"
- "Poppenmoppen"
- "Popverdorie"
- "Poppenkast"

From 2013, a series for children between 1–4 years was launched, De Wereld van Schanulleke (The World of Schanulleke).

== In popular culture ==
Child daycare centers in Ghent, Meerbeke and Roeselare, Flanders have been named after the character, as well as a children's clothing store in Woerden and IJsselstein.

The character was made into different actual rag dolls too.
