= Suske en Wiske =

Belgian comic series

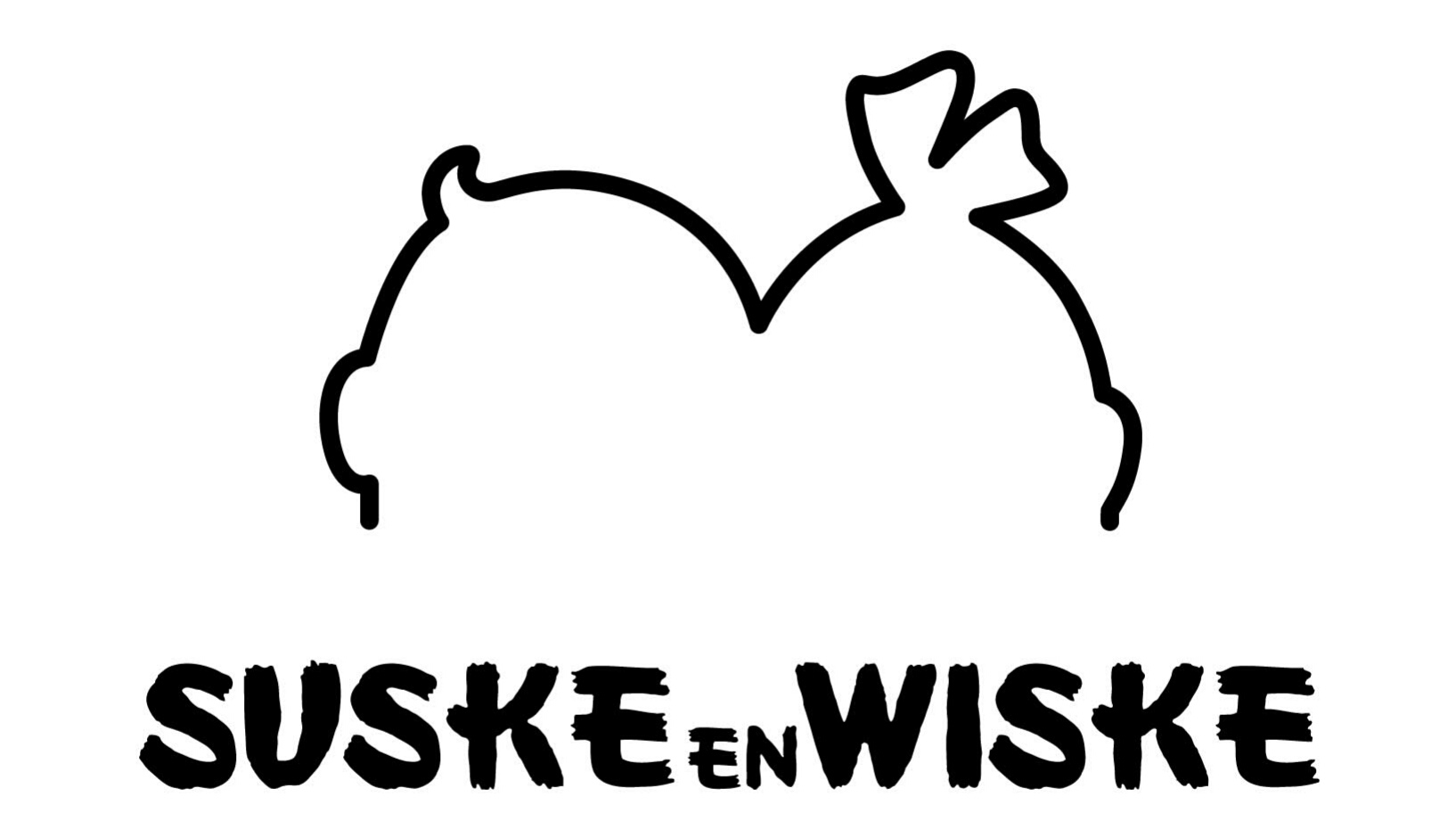
- Logo for the original Dutch language version

Publication information
- Publisher: De Nieuwe Standaard; Tintin magazine
- Publication date: 1946–present
- No. of issues: 380+
- Main character(s): Suske, Wiske, Tante Sidonia, Lambik, Jerom

Creative team
- Created by: Willy Vandersteen
- Written by: Willy Vandersteen (1945–1971, 1975–1977, 1982, 1985–1986, 1988); Paul Geerts (1971–2002); Marc Verhaegen (1988–2005); Peter Van Gucht (2005-)
- Artist(s): Willy Vandersteen; Paul Geerts; Marc Verhaegen; Luc Morjaeu; Wout Schoonis

Suske en Wiske (Dutch title), translated into English as Willy and Wanda (1976–1987), Bob and Bobette (1989–2006), Spike and Suzy (1998–2001), and Luke and Lucy (2011–2025), is a Belgian comics series created by the late comics author Willy Vandersteen.

It was first published in De Nieuwe Standaard in 1945 and soon became popular. Although not in its earliest form, the strip soon adapted the Ligne claire style, pioneered by Hergé. This change took place when the strip became serialised in Hergé's magazine Tintin from 1948 to 1959.

The books revolve around the adventures of the eponymous Suske and Wiske, two children (pre-adolescent or adolescent depending on the album), along with their friends and family. The stories combine elements of comedy, fantasy, and science fiction, such as talking animals, time travel and ghosts. The strip still runs daily in the Belgian newspaper De Standaard, and new books continue to be published; as of May 2020, 382 albums have been published.

== Main characters ==
The main characters are a group of friends, living familywise though the only blood-relation is Sidonia being an aunt of Suzy. In the first regular comic, Suzy and her aunt Sidonia meet the orphan Spike and unrelated Professor Barabas. In the next album De Sprietatoom, they also meet Ambrose. Later, in De dolle musketiers (book #18, 1953), Jerom (called Jethro in the UK version), the "strongest man in the western hemisphere", was introduced. Apart from Suzy and Aunt Sidonia, none of them are related, and other family is only introduced occasionally to drive a particular story.

Suske en Wiske (Spike and Suzy)

- Suske (Flemish diminutive of François/Franciscus), also known as Willy or Bob (in French), is a young orphan who becomes friends with Suzy and Aunt Sidonia. This happens only in the second album, Het Eiland Amoras from 1946, which would become the first in the regular series. For the first album, the publisher had pushed Vandersteen to go with the name and character "Rikki", but the author soon worked around this and found a way to introduce "Suske", in part because he thought Rikki resembled Tintin too much.

Spike has black hair with a small trademark spike. He started out as a hyperactive and headlong fighter, not unlike many a young male adolescent in the "Seefhoek", the Antwerp neighbourhood where Vandersteen grew up. Only in the first album, Spike would get totally out of control when he heard the battle cry "Seefhoek vooruit!" ("Seefhoek Forward!"), replaced by "Antigoon vooruit" in later reprints. But as soon as his outfit evolved from mere duds towards a more tidy red polo shirt and black trousers, he became a well-behaved and obedient boy. He is smart, brave, idealistic and mostly rational, making him an emotional opposite to Suzy. Where she gets in trouble with Sidonia or Ambrose, he acts as go-between to restore peace.

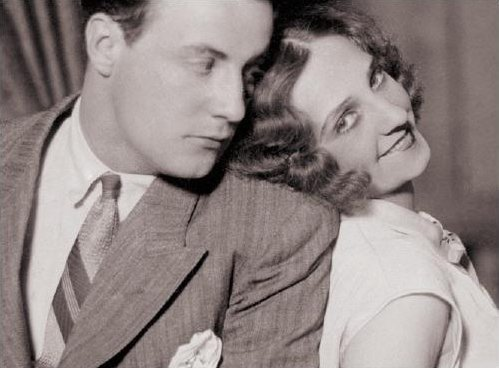
Louisa Ghijs was Vandersteen's inspiration for the name Wiske.

- Wiske (Flemish diminutive of Louise/Louisa), also known as Wanda or Bobette (in French), is the young heroine. She first appeared in the very first out-of-series prequel Rikki en Wiske in Chocowakije from 1945, where she has an older brother Rikki, but he disappears after that story to be replaced by Spike.

Suzy lives together with him and her aunt Sidonia, and is typically (certainly in the older stories) dressed in a white dress with a red stripe just above the hem, and a red ribbon in her fair hair. In the first stories, she looks like a preschooler of about 6 years old, but soon afterwards she evolves into a young teenager of about 12-13. Vandersteen seems to have modelled her after his oldest daughter Leen, of similar age at the time.
She is strong-headed, impulsive, curious and slightly foolish. Aspects of her character that come naturally with a young teenager who enters puberty, and a great plot device since her repeated stubbornness and disobedience is the source of many an adventure. Since her emotions and human shortcomings often overpower her rationality, she is sensitive to paranormal and mystical happenings that are routinely dismissed by the others. Her relationship with Spike (both are considered orphans) is mostly one between siblings, although at times it looks like there are more feelings under the surface, as she can get quite jealous and querulous when Spike gets female attention. Suzy is also a brave girl, especially when it comes to defending her doll Muffin, for whom she shows unconditional motherly love. Despite her difficult character at times, she appears contrite and righteous. She carries her heart in the right place and won't hesitate to battle injustice. Suzy ends most of the albums by winking to the reader from within the very last panel.

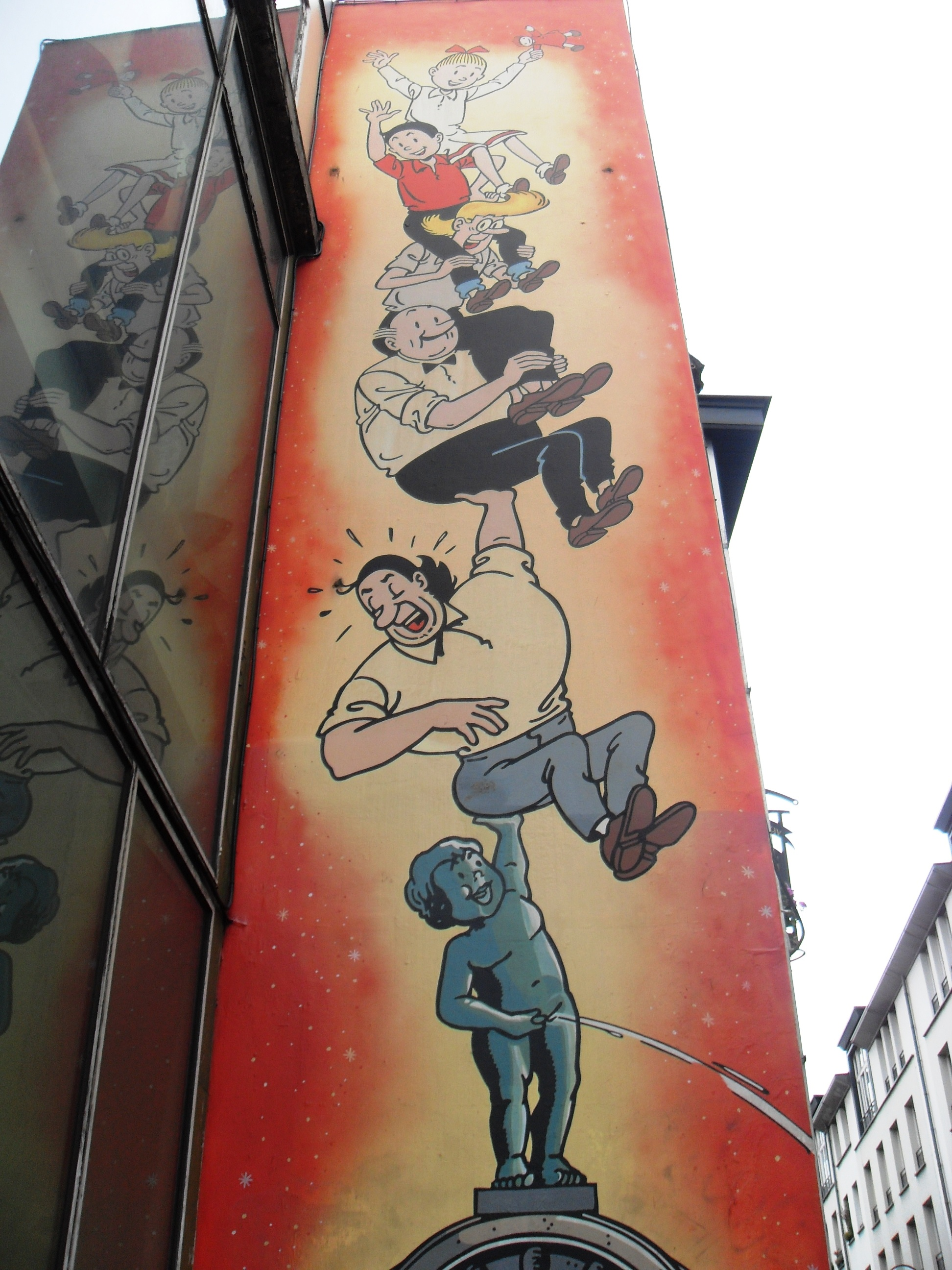
Main characters on a mural in Brussels: from top to bottom Suzy holding Muffin, Spike, Aunt Sidonia, Ambrose and Jethro, lifted up by Manneken Pis

- Muffin, originally Schalulleke, later renamed to Schanulleke (sometimes Schabolleke), also known as Molly or Sawdust, is Suzy's doll. A small female figure, she is inanimate. She has a major role in a few stories when she gets stolen (album 6, "Prinses Zagemeel"), brought to life, or is turned into a mindless giant.
- Aunt Sidonia, originally called tante Sidonie, later renamed to tante Sidonia, and also once known as Agatha, appears as Suzy's aunt, right from the first album. Sidonia was Vandersteen's way of providing a caring authority figure for Spike and Suzy without introducing actual parents, who would constrain their adventurous tendencies too much.

Sidonia is portrayed as a (1950s) housewife (cooking and cleaning, doing the dishes, complaining when Spike and Suzy don’t show proper respect for her household work). Nevertheless she also often joins the heroes on their adventures, and occasionally shows unexpected qualities as pilot of the Gyronef.
Long and extremely thin with gigantic feet (routinely referred to as "ferries"), with a large protruding chin and fair hair, she’s hardly blessed with physical beauty. As such, her looks are often the target of offensive remarks, in particular by a less than subtle Ambrose. On the other hand, her thinness enables her to pull off tricks like hiding herself in a split second from the bad guys behind nearby streetlights and telephone poles.
Sidonia is also known for her hysterical nervous breakdowns, where she can often no longer utter words while her body ends up as stiff as a wooden plank, and for her (unrequited) crush on Ambrose.

- Professor Barabas, is a long-time friend of Suzy and Aunt Sidonia, first met in Het Eiland Amoras (An Island called Hoboken). He starts off as a jungle explorer with a topee, but later becomes the archetypical comics professor: glasses, a white laboratory coat, often absent-minded because he is thinking deeply about some scientific question. Although he is not a mad scientist, and entirely benevolent, his inventions regularly cause trouble when they end up in the wrong hands. This happens more than once because of his lack of streetwiseness in dealing with criminals. His main inventions are the Teletime machine (which enables them to travel through time and space), the Gyronef (a helicopter well ahead of its time), the Terranef (a subterranean vehicle), and the Klankentapper, which enables one to talk with plants and inanimate objects. Contrary to most other main characters, he does not appear in all comics.
- Ambrose, originally called Lambik and once known as Orville, is a bald man (apart from six hairs, three on either side) of about fifty. The original Flemish name was inspired by a Belgian beer Lambic that is brewed in the Belgian region of Pajottenland, where Vandersteen lived for a short time. He is first encountered in album 3, The Zincshrinker, as a rather stupid plumber, although Vandersteen already created the standalone personage the year before (1945) as "Pukkel" ("pimple" in English).

In the beginning, Ambrose was presented as a typical working class member: rough and rather simple and uneducated. Prone to alcoholism and other scourges, he also had a somewhat tragic side. This largely came to an end when Vandersteen started to work for Hergé, who didn't like the folksy component. In particular in the period of The Blue Series, Ambrose suddenly becomes sophisticated, bright and brave, even aristocratic (for example he teaches fencing) and is arguably truly the main character of the story in those albums. Later, the personage gets its definitive outfit (black trousers, white starched shirt and a black bow tie) and settles as a middle class part-time father figure for Spike and Suzy, who lives together with Jethro.
Ambrose is intended as the comic relief of the series. His baldness and pronounced nose inspire ridicule throughout the whole series. Another running gag is that he brings up his World War I military gear (sandbags, barbed wire, helmet, rifle...) when a situation becomes critical. Generally presumptuous, vain and impulsive, he confronts the reader with his own shortcomings. Typically, he considers himself the main hero, and in particular the "brains", since he can't possibly over trump Jethro when it comes to physical power (and as it frequently turns out, not in the intellectual department either!). His friends then usually play along, just to keep him happy. The relationship between Suzy and Ambrose, one even more stubborn than the other, makes for a great generation conflict that spices up many stories. In the end, Ambrose does have a noble nature, as illustrated by the many occasions that he sacrifices himself for the greater good. But it helps a great deal when he is first assured of recognition...

- Jethro, originally known as Jerom or Jerommeke and also known as Wilbur, is an extremely strong man, brought from prehistory to the Middle Ages by an alchemist in album 18, The merry musketeers, as a mindless weapon.

Although he is introduced into the series as an opponent, he quickly turns around as he falls in love with Muffin and becomes a caring man instead of a wild beast. Initially he is dressed in a loincloth only (with an occasional cravat added in an amusing attempt to appear more civilized) and speaks in grunts and monosyllables. His prehistoric background causes him to observe the modern world and customs with the naivete (and often unimpeded insight) of a child. But soon afterwards he becomes a smart, sophisticated man, although he still speaks in a peculiar shorthand. He lives together with Ambrose, and his level-headedness is used to contrast with the latter’s foolishness.
Apart from superhuman strength (used for exploits like squeezing water from rocks in the desert), his special powers include "flashlight eyes" and X-ray vision (at any other time his eyelids remain closed), running faster than sound and stopping bullets with his muscular chest. As such, his character is often used as a deus ex machina solution for the troubles his friends and especially Ambrose get in. But when the scenarists are inspired, he is equally often drugged or away on a trip as to avoid the easy solution for the story.

=== Other recurring characters ===
- Krimson. A principal villain, Krimson was introduced in Het rijmende paard (#48, 1963). He survives a plane-crash and starts over as an international drug kingpin in De sissende sampan (#49, 1963) before serving a prison-sentence. In Amoris van Amoras (#200, 1984) Krimson seems to have changed his ways by becoming a project-developer on Hoboken. This appears to be a passing interest as De Kwaaie Kwieten (#209, 1987) marks his return to form by constructing a top-secret military base capable of fighting extraterrestrials. Growing stronger again, Krimson manages to overthrow the Belgian government (De Krimson Crisis, #215, 1988). For reasons unknown he often suffers from mental breakdowns, throwing fits until his butler force feeds him a large quantity of pills. Despite his name there is no connection between him and the colour crimson, other than that both often have sinister connotations.
- Arthur is Ambrose's younger brother who grew up in the jungle and gained the ability to fly from the juice of a plant. He is more primitive than his brother, but substantially smarter. He dresses in animal skins and wears a beard, though it is unknown if he, unlike Ambrose, has much hair on his head as he always sports a bowler hat. He spends more time in the air and in trees than on the ground, and therefore has acquired some bird characteristics, such as standing on his hands instead of his feet and chirping while speaking. His favorite food is birdseed. He has appeared in 5 albums so far.
- Sus Antigoon is an ancestor of Spike, discoverer of Amoras Island and founder of the city Amoras. He died of alcohol abuse and therefore always appears as a ghost with a bottle chained to his leg. Because of his drunkenness, Sus Antigoon often brings the protagonists in danger. He has appeared in 12 albums so far.

=== Character evolution ===
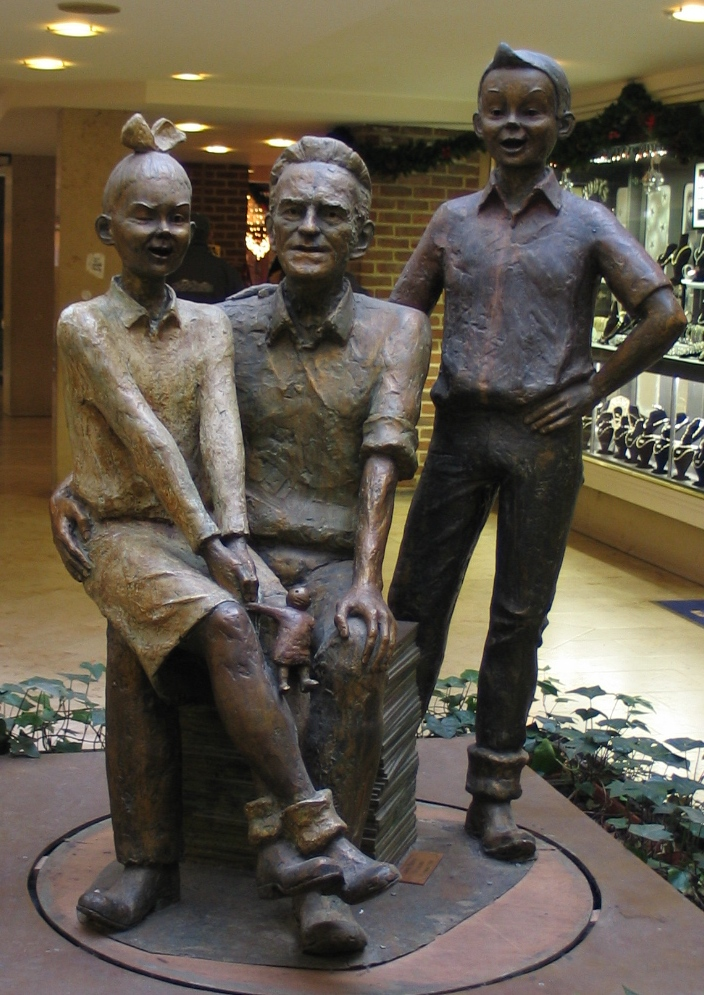
Statue of Willy Vandersteen with Suske, Wiske and Schanulleke in Hasselt (Belgium)

Over the course of the series, characters are added and changed, and stories become more didactic. Ambrose and Jethro change significantly: in the beginning, Ambrose was just an amusing fool, but in the Blue Series he appears more sophisticated and heroic, evolving towards a cynical and sceptical man in the current stories. In early stories, Jethro was initially portrayed as an ignorant strong man, who evolved into a sophisticated and quiet man in later works. In most stories Muffin is only a doll, but one very special to Suzy, and they are inseparable. In some stories Muffin comes to life and plays an important role.

=== Settings ===
In the earliest stories, Willy Vandersteen used fictional countries like "Chokowakije" ("Chocolaslovakia") and "Amoras" (a tropical island, "Hoboken", actually a real town in Belgium, in the English-language version). He dropped the use of those after a few stories, although some later stories revisit Amoras.

Most of the current adventures of Spike and Suzy happen in real countries all over the world, with Belgium (their home country) as main focus for many stories.

While in the early stories large distances were usually traveled using the fictitious Gyronef, an experimental helicopter devised by professor Barabas, starting from the 1960s all air travel is provided by the Dutch national airline KLM, making it an early and prominent example of product placement in European comics. Vandersteen chose KLM over the Belgian national airline SABENA because of his friendship with Ron Winderink, PR manager at KLM.

== Publication history ==
Willy Vandersteen created Suske en Wiske, beginning publication in De Nieuwe Standaard on 30 March 1945. To Vandersteen's disappointment the editor had renamed the strip's first chapter Rikki en Wiske. The following story was titled De avonturen van Suske en Wiske - Op het eiland Amoras and no longer featured Rikki. After a few years of publication in several newspapers, Vandersteen was approached by Hergé, intent to improve sales of the Dutch-language version of Tintin magazine (Kuifje), who wanted Suske and Wiske for his publications redrawn in the Ligne claire style. Vandersteen made the adaptation and Suske en Wiske first appeared in Kuifje and Belgian Tintin on 16 September 1948 with the story titled Het Spaanse spook and Le Fantôme Espagnol in the two languages. All 8 stories that were run until it ended in April 1959 made up the material collected in The Blue Series.

Vandersteen established Studio Vandersteen in 1952 to manage his expanded activities. To have time for other series such as De Rode Ridder (The Red Knight) and Tijl Uilenspiegel, he gave Paul Geerts the job of creating new albums of Suske en Wiske in 1968. Geerts did this until 2001, when he gave this task to Marc Verhaegen. From 2005 on, a team of writers and cartoonists makes the new series, led by Luc Morjeau. These authors are helped by Studio Vandersteen.

On 17 December 2022, after 77 years, De Standaard newspaper ended daily publication of Suske en Wiske, following a cost-benefit decision.

== Publications ==
=== Newspapers and magazines ===
Before Suske en Wiske appeared as albums, they were published in several newspapers and magazines, such as:

- De Standaard (1945–2022) daily newspaper
- Tintin magazine and Kuifje magazine (1948–1959) Éditions du Lombard's French and Dutch sister publications
- TV Ekspres (1972–2001) weekly TV magazine
- Suske en Wiske Weekblad (1993–2003) weekly comics magazine

=== Red Series and Blue Series ===
The books are generally divided into two groups - Red Series and Blue series. The Red Series contains the vast majority of the books, and is so called because all of the books in this series have a red coloured cover. There are only a few books in the blue series, and they are so called because of their blue cover. The blue series encompasses all those originally published in Tintin and Kuifje. The Red series is everything published before or after. The following album series exist:

- 1.The Red Series
1. The Flemish non-coloured series (1946–1959): 1-35
2. The French non-coloured series
3. The non-coloured series in Dutch for the Netherlands (1953–1959): 1-23
4. The Flemish two-coloured series (1959–1964): 7,19,20,32-50
5. The French two-coloured series
6. The Dutch two-coloured series (1959–1964): 1,8,10,11,21-50
7. The "uniform" Flemish(-Belgian) - Dutch (two-coloured) series (1964–1966): 51-66 (under flamingantistic influence)
8. The four-coloured series (1967-...): 67-... ; the first 66 albums and the blue series have been re-edited in this series.
- 2.The Blue Series (1952–1957)

=== Special editions ===
Other stories or editions have been published, such as:

1. The collector's editions (1958-...)
2. Advertisement editions (1965-...)
3. Various collections (1972-...)
4. Holiday editions (1973-...)
5. Luxury editions (1977-...)
6. Suske en Wiske Classics (1993–1999)

=== Albums in English ===
English translations have been published in three incarnations. The first was in the U.S., under the name of Willy and Wanda. It was then published in the UK in the 1990s named Bob and Bobette, a copy of the Belgian title in French. The final print run was in the UK by the title Spike and Suzy.

=== Other languages ===
Logo of Bob and Bobette, the French version of Spike and Suzy

The comic book series was also published in Belgium in French, under the name Bob et Bobette (Bob and Bobette in English). Translations in other languages (including regional dialects) are plentiful but may exist as short-lived series only.

Books out of the series have been published in the following languages:

- Afrikaans: Neelsie en Miemsie
- Brabantian: Suske en Wieske
- Chinese (standard version): 波布和波贝特 (Bobu & Bobete: 1996) or 苏苏和维维历险记 (Susu & WeiWei: from 2011)
- Chinese (Taiwanese version): 達達和貝貝歷險記 (Dada & Beibei)
- Danish: Finn & Fiffi (later: Bob & Bobette)
- Esperanto: Cisko kaj Vinjo
- Finnish: Anu ja Antti
- German: Ulla und Peter (later: Bob und Babette/Suske und Wiske/Frida und Freddie)
- Greek: Bobi & Lou
- Hebrew: Bob & Bobet
- Indonesian: Bobby dan Wanda (later: Suske dan Wiske)
- Icelandic: Siggi og Vigga
- Irish: Spike agus Suzy
- Italian: Bob e Bobette
- Japanese: ススカとウィスカ (Susuka & Wisuka)
- Latin: Lucius et Lucia
- Norwegian: Finn & Fiffi
- Portuguese: Bibi & Baba
- Portuguese (Brazil): Zé & Maria
- Spanish: Bob y Bobette, Bob y Bobet
- Swahili: Bob na Bobette
- Swedish: Finn och Fiffi
- Tamil: Suski & Wiski(சுஸ்கி & விஸ்கி)
- Tibetan: Baga & Basang
- Persian: بوبی و بوبت ( Bobi & Bobet )
- Polish: Lucek i Luśka
- Slovenian: Spike in Suzy
- Russian: Спайк и Сьюзи

== Spin-off series ==
There have been various spin-off comic series from Spike and Suzy:

- In 1960, Jerom began publication. It featured the character Jerom (Jethro) and focused on his adventures as a modern-day knight.
- In the 1950s, Lambik (Ambrose), ran in the newspaper De Bond. These were then put into the albums called De Grappen van Lambik ("The jokes of Ambrose"). The series was ended in 1962, but in 2004, it resumed with new stories. Seven books in the new series have been released.
- In 2002, Klein Suske en Wiske ("Young Spike and Suzy") ran in the magazine Suske en Wiske Weekblad. It charts the adventures of the children when they were very small, along with their pet dog. So far nine albums have been released, containing short sketches.
- In May 2013, the first edition of Amoras was released, a spin-off, more adult-oriented series, with a more manga-like type of drawing and with more violence and strong language. In the series, Spike and Suzy are 'flashed' by accident to the year 2047 and find themselves on the isle of Amoras (where they were in the first Belgian album). Charel Cambré came up with the original idea and drew the art, the scenario was written by Marc Legendre. The first issue, called Wiske, received a lot of positive response and media coverage. The sixth and last in the spin-off series was published on 4 November 2015.
- Although Standaard uitgeverij was adamant that this was a one time only, news of a new series within the same spin-off universe reached the fans in March 2016. In 'De Kronieken van Amoras' the reader gets more background info on the events leading to the story in Amoras' and about the different characters. In March 2017, De zaak Krimson was released and there are two more publications planned within this series.

== Adaptations ==
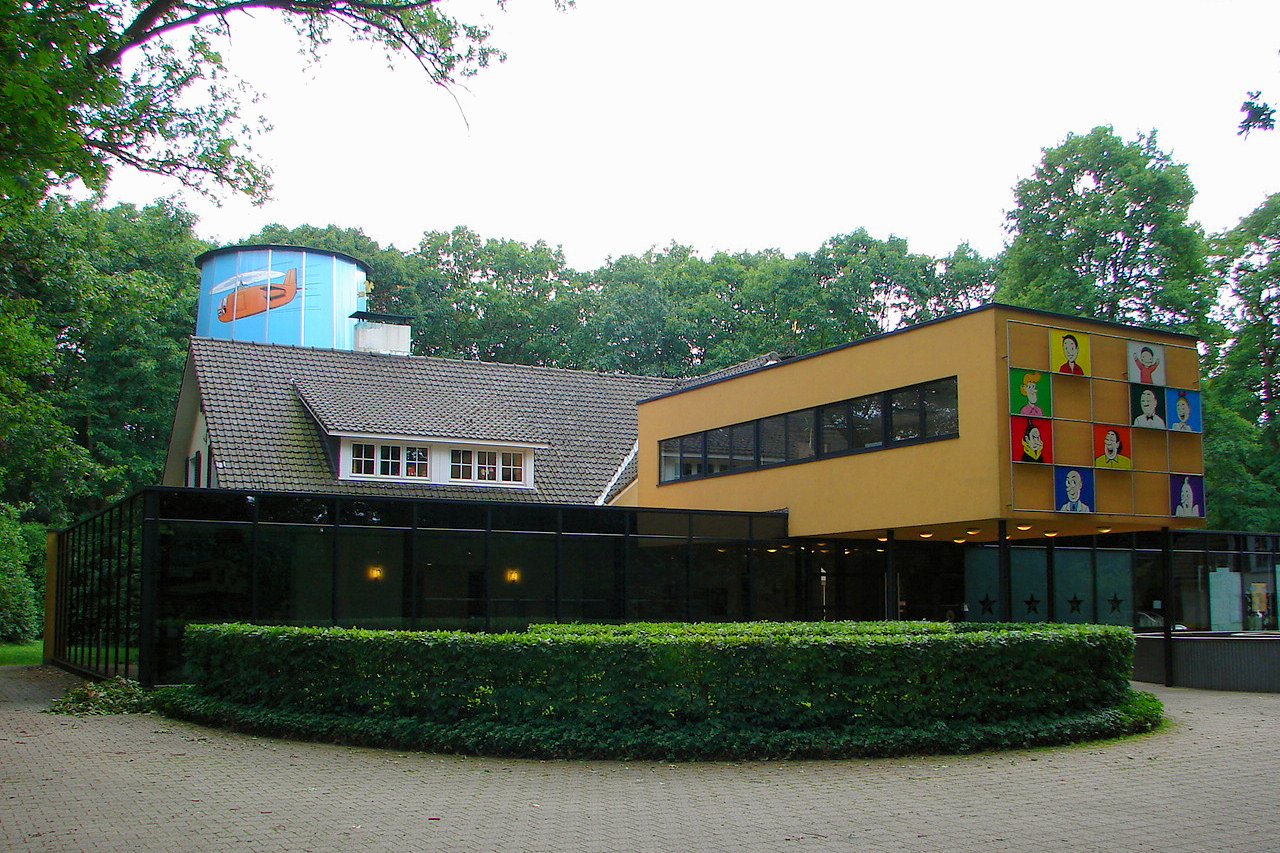
Suske en Wiske Children's Museum in Kalmthout.

Suske en Wiske has reached such a popularity in the Dutch-speaking world that various media adaptations have been made.

=== Theatrical adaptations ===
In 1949, Dutch puppeteer Karel Weyler of the Flemish puppet theater Pats' Poppenspel adapted some Suske en Wiske series as puppet plays. Willy Vandersteen enjoyed these versions and gave him permission to make more. The music was composed by Armand Preud'homme and the dialogues were written by Jef Contrijn, whose wife, Germaine Gijsels also designed the costumes. Vandersteen returned the favor by helping to design the backgrounds and referencing "Pats Poppenspel" in the Suske en Wiske stories "De Mottenvanger" ("The Moth Catcher"), "De Circusbaron" ("The Circus Baron"), "Het Hondenparadijs" ("The Dog Paradise"), "De Wilde Weldoener" ("The Wild Humanitarian") and "De Poppenpakker" ("The Puppet Catcher"). Between 1974 and 1977, Vandersteen also made a comics series about "Pats" until copyright issues forced him to change the title into "Tits".

In 1994, the Royal Youth Theatre of Antwerp made a theatrical musical called "De Stralende Sterren". It ran for several years and was both a success in Flanders as well as the Netherlands.

In July 2002, a new musical premiered, based on the album "De Spokenjagers" ("The Ghost Hunters"), again touring with huge success in Flanders and the Netherlands.

In 2008, the album "De Circusbaron" ("The Circus Baron") was adapted into a theatrical musical, which toured in Belgium and the Netherlands.

=== TV adaptations ===
In 1955, the Pats Poppenspel puppet shows were broadcast on Flemish television. This was the first attempt to bring the comics to television. A limited animation series was made the same decade.

Far more successful was the 1975-1976 puppet series. The Belgian TV network BRT produced a TV puppet series consisting of six original stories told by Lambik, all of them broadcast as five-minute episodes, which were each 22 minutes in length. These stories ("De Minilotten van Kokonera", "De Gouden Locomotief", "De Zingende Kaars", "De Windbrekers", "De Regenboogprinses" and "Het Laatste Dwaallicht") were later adapted into comic book albums. The puppets were made by Creatuur in collaboration with André Henderickx. Vandersteen's studio created the backgrounds and props. The series was a tremendous success in the Netherlands and largely responsible for the comics' ultimate breakthrough there. Re-runs were broadcast in 1985 and 1990.

In the early 1990s, an animated TV series was made by Atelier5, broadcast on VTM. Each episode was based on original Suske en Wiske stories, with Han Peekel as narrating voice-over. They were also made available on video.

=== Film adaptations ===
In 2004, the album "De Duistere Diamant" ("The Dark Diamond") was adapted to the silver screen by Rudi Van den Bossche as the live-action film De duistere diamant.

A CGI animated film called Luke and Lucy: The Texas Rangers was released in July 2009. Produced by Skyline Entertainment, it was planned to be the first of a series of 13 films.

=== Video game adaptations ===
In 2001, Infogrames released Suske en Wiske: De Tijdtemmers for the Game Boy Color. It was only released in Europe.

On 19 July 2009, a video game was released for the Nintendo DS, based on the 3-D animated movie Luke and Lucy: The Texas Rangers.

== In popular culture ==
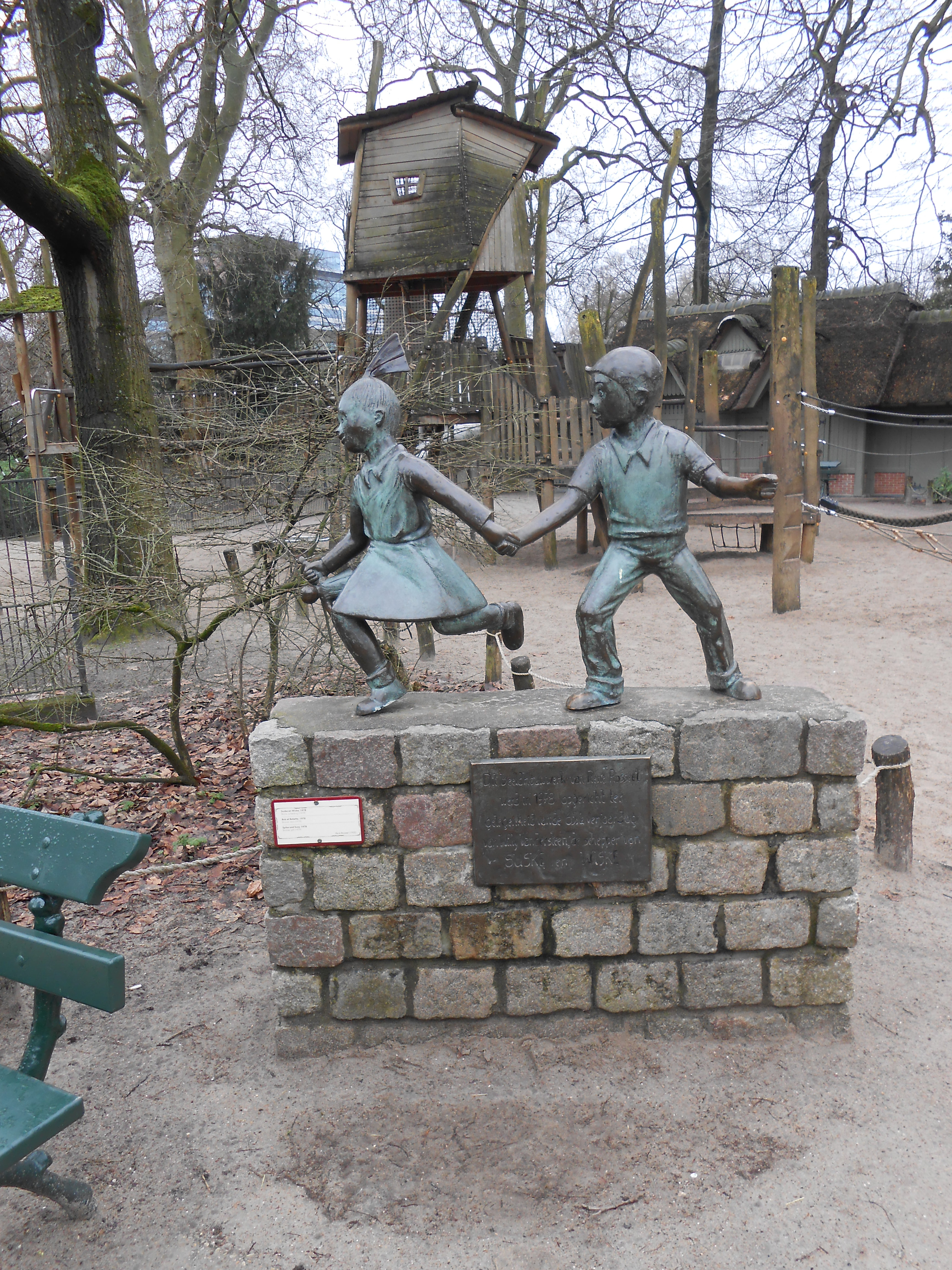
Suske en Wiske statue in the Antwerp Zoo

Suske and Wiske have their own statue in the Antwerp Zoo in Antwerp. It was sculpted by René Rosseel in 1978. Suske, Wiske, Lambik and Jerom also have statues in Middelkerke, sculpted by Monique Mol in respectively 2002, 2005 and 2013

In the Belgian Comic Strip Center in Brussels the permanent exhibition brings homage to the pioneers of Belgian comics, among them Willy Vandersteen. In the room dedicated to his work a replica of Professor Barabas' teletijdmachine ("tele time machine") can be seen.

On 15 June 1995, an illustrated wall was dedicated to the series in the Rue de Laeken/Lakensestraat in Brussels. Suske and Wiske are also part of an illustrated wall in the Korte Ridderstraat 8 in Antwerp, which was revealed on 13 May 2006. On 24 April 2009, a similar wall was revealed in Kalmthout.

The character Lambik inspired the name of the Dutch comic book store Lambiek in Amsterdam. The misspelling of the name is due to the fact that the early Dutch publications of "Suske en Wiske" called him "Lambiek". The emblem on the store's sign is an image from the Suske en Wiske story "Prinses Zagemeel" ("Princess Sawdust") (1947–1948) and represents Lambik's metamorphosis into a centaur.

== Sources ==
- Index of Suske en Wiske publications, Suske en Wiske publications in Kuifje Suske en Wiske op het www (in Dutch)
- Bob et Bobette publications in Belgian Tintin Archived 26 March 2007 at the Wayback Machine and French Tintin BDoubliées (in French)
