= Suske =

Belgian comic strip character

Publication information
- Publisher: Standaard Uitgeverij (Belgium)
- First appearance: Suske en Wiske: Het Eiland Amoras (1945).
- Created by: Willy Vandersteen

Suske (English: Willy, Luke, Bob, Spike) is one of the main characters in the popular Belgian comic strip Suske en Wiske by Willy Vandersteen. He is the boy of the duo.

== History ==
When Willy Vandersteen created his first adventure story with the characters Wiske, Tante Sidonia and Professor Barabas, "Rikki en Wiske in Chocowakije" ("Rikki and Wiske in Chocowakije") (1945) he already gave the little girl Wiske a boy companion called Suske. However, in this early incarnation the boy was her older and stronger brother. Also, Vandersteen's publisher had changed the character's name into "Rikki" without his knowledge, let alone with his approval. This turned out to be for the better, since Vandersteen felt that the character was way too old to be a good companion to the much younger Wiske. He also resembled Tintin too much. Thus, at the start of the next story, "Op Het Eiland Amoras" ("On The Isle of Amoras") (1945) Vandersteen sent Rikki off to get a ration stamp for shoes and effectively wrote him out of the series. In the course of the story Wiske, Sidonia and Barabas travel to the isle of Amoras where Wiske meets a local orphan named Suske. He explains to her that he is the last living relative of Sus Antigoon, his great-great-great-grandfather. Wiske joins him in the Amorasians' battle against their oppressors. At the end of the story Suske is adopted by aunt Sidonia and travels back to Belgium.

Suske was named after Vandersteen's father, Sus Vandersteen. The diminutive "-ke" in Flemish dialect means "little", thus "Suske" would translate back to "Little Sus". In some stories his full name, François, is mentioned, but not often.

== Character ==
Suske is somewhat of a flat character. He is brave, honest, helpful, smart, polite, heroic, strong and has no real flaws in the way that Wiske or Lambik have. This also explains why he is the least popular character in the franchise. In "Het Eiland Amoras" he often went berserk whenever someone said the battle cry "Seefhoek vooruit!" (the "Seefhoek" was the neighborhood in Antwerp where Vandersteen grew up. In reprints this was changed to "Antigoon vooruit!"). This element was dropped in later stories.

Despite being one of the main protagonists of the series Suske is rarely the focus of the stories. In "De Stalen Bloempot" ("The Steel Flowerpot") (1950) Suske is brought back to his native Amoras to become king. At the end of the story he abdicates because he doesn't want to leave his friends behind. In "Het Ros Bazhaar" ("The Horse Bazhaar") (1974) Suske runs away from home, because he feels the others don't understand him. He does this again in "De Curieuze Neuzen" ("The Curious Noses") (2007), but this time because he feels unwanted seeing he is an orphan. In "De Goalgetter" (1990) Suske becomes an association football champion and his success goes to his head. In "Het Gebroken Dorp" (2014) Suske becomes count of Marchimont, after saving the city from a local curse.

== Relation with Wiske ==
Suske and Wiske are best friends, despite quarreling once in a while. One of the recurring storylines is Wiske's jealousy whenever Suske receives attention from other young, attractive females.

== In spin-offs ==
Suske plays the central role in the spin-off series Amoras. The first volume is named after him. He is also the central character in the junior version Klein Suske en Wiske ("Little Suske and Wiske").

== In popular culture ==
Both he and Wiske have their own statue in the Antwerp Zoo in Antwerp. It was sculpted by René Rosseel in 1978. They also have a statue in Middelkerke, sculpted by Monique Mol in 2002.

On June 15, 1995 an illustrated wall was dedicated to Suske and Wiske in the Laekenstraat in Brussels, Belgium.

Suske and Wiske are also part of an illustrated wall in the Korte Ridderstraat 8 in Antwerp, which was revealed on May 13, 2006. On April 24, 2009 a similar wall was revealed in Kalmthout.

In the 1975-1976 Dutch TV puppet series Suske en Wiske Suske's voice was done by Paula Majoor.

In the 1994 musical "De Stralende Sterren" David Verbeeck played the part of Suske. In the 2002 musical "De Spokenjagers" Suske was played by Sébastien De Smet. Niels Destadsbader played Suske in the 2008 musical "De Circusbaron".

In the 2004 live-action film De duistere diamant Joeri Busschots played Suske. In the 2009 3-D animated feature film Luke and Lucy: The Texas Rangers Marijn Klaver played Luke (Suske).
