= Lambik =

Publication information
- Publisher: Standaard Uitgeverij (Belgium)
- First appearance: Suske en Wiske: De Sprietatoom (1946).
- Created by: Willy Vandersteen

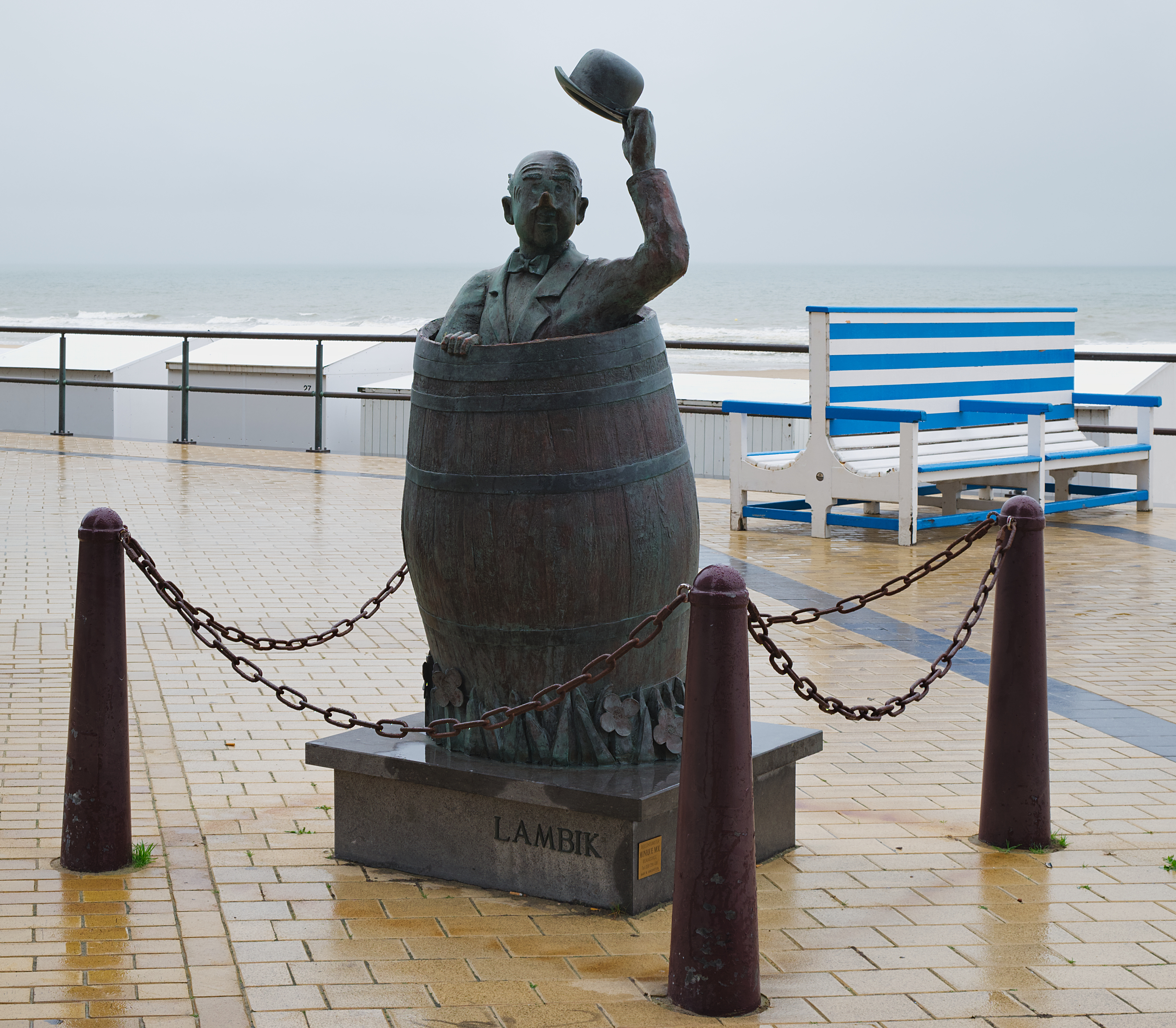
Statue of Lambik in Middelkerke

Lambik is a Flemish comic book character from the Belgian comic strip series Spike and Suzy by Willy Vandersteen. In the English translations he is known as Orville or Ambrose. Lambik is the breakout character of the franchise and one of the most popular and recognizable comic book characters in Belgium and the Netherlands.

Lambik is a middle-aged, fairly fat man who is bald, except for three small hairs behind each of his ears. He often wears a white shirt, a black bow tie and black pants. He is an anti hero. He is a dumb, clumsy, vain, arrogant, absent-minded, aggressive, stubborn and dominant character, but has a heart of gold and provides comic relief in the series.

Lambik's popularity is so huge that he was also a main character in one of Vandersteen's other series, "De Vrolijke Bengels" (1950-1953), and a spin-off series of "Suske en Wiske" called "De Grappen van Lambik" ("The Jokes of Lambik") (1955-1962).

== Origins ==
Willy Vandersteen drew Lambik in the winter of 1944-1945 on some white sheets of paper, before he started Suske en Wiske a year later. The character was initially called "Pukkel" ("Pimple"). Later he was named "Lambik", based on Vandersteen's favorite beer style Lambic. He made his debut in De Sprietatoom ("The Tiny Atom") (1946) where he introduces himself as an amateur detective and part-time plumber. In later stories Lambik sometimes performs these professions again, but usually he is able to do other jobs as well.

== Character ==
Lambik is an anti-hero. In early stories Lambik was extremely stupid, clumsy, absent-minded and untrustworthy. He often gets in the way of the main characters, even betraying them sometimes, and is more an obstacle than an aid. In later stories Lambik lost some of his stupidity, though not much, and became more vain and dominant. He has a tendency to overestimate himself and his big mouth brings the others often in serious troubles. Lambik is also easily fooled and is usually the last or only one not to realize this. He can be very cowardly and put the blame for his mistakes on others. Sometimes he gets aggressive and feels mistreated by society, which causes him to flee to other places.

Lambik is also greedy and in several stories he tries to get rich, powerful, respected or a beautiful female partner. He is prone to seduction and often has to consult his conscience. Over the course of the series he has betrayed his friends regularly, yet he always makes up for the damage he caused.

Vandersteen saw Lambik as his favorite character, almost an alter ego.

== Blue series ==
In the "blue series" stories Vandersteen drew for the magazine Tintin, Lambik is drawn in a more anatomically correct and athletic fashion and is more brave, heroic and cunning compared to the "red series". This was done at request of Hergé, who wanted the series to be more in line to the style of the magazine.

== Family history ==
Lambik had a few historical ancestors. Lambiorix (pun on Ambiorix) was chieftain of the Eburones. In the 16th century a certain Evariste lived in Binche. Two centuries later Johan Matheus Lambik was part of the Buckriders. Lambik's grand uncle, Hippoliet, was introduced in "De Formidabele Fantast" (2005).

Lambik's father, Papal-Ambik, was a poet who was incarcerated in a mental institution. Lambik and his brother Arthur freed him and brought him to the African country Rotswana (pun on Botswana), where he and Arthur still live. Papal-Ambik had a singing career at one point. Arthur is able to fly after eating a certain plant.

Lambik was born on the 14th. The month is never mentioned, but since his astrological sign is Virgo he is probably born on 14 September. According to him "the youth was still working in mines when he was young". He had blond, reddish hair as a child. In some stories he claims to be a veteran from the First World War and when danger lurks about he fetches his army uniform and weapons. In later stories the material is described as "souvenirs" from that era.

== Spin-off appearances ==
Due to Lambik's popularity Vandersteen used him, Suske and Wiske as characters in his other series "De Vrolijke Bengels" between 1950 and 1953. In 1955 Lambik got his own spin-off series called "De Grappen van Lambik", which was a gag cartoon series. The series was published in syndication until 1962 and spawned three albums. In 2005 Studio Vandersteen rebooted the series with new gags. Four new albums were made until the series was terminated in 2007.

== In popular culture ==
Lambik inspired the name of the Dutch comic book store Lambiek in Amsterdam. The unusual spelling of the name is due to the fact that the early Dutch publications of "Suske en Wiske" called him "Lambiek". The emblem on the store's sign is an image from the Suske en Wiske story "Prinses Zagemeel" ("Princess Sawdust") (1947-1948) and represents Lambik's metamorphosis into a centaur. He is still the mascot of the store today.

In the puppet series "Suske en Wiske" (1975) Henk Molenberg did Lambik's voice. In the Suske en Wiske musical "De Stralende Sterren" (1994) Ronald Van Rillaer played the part of Lambik. Since the success of this play he became the official performer of Lambik in all stage adaptations of "Suske en Wiske", including "De Spokenjagers" (2002) and "De Circusbaron" (2008). In the live-action movie De duistere diamant (2004) Dirk Roofthooft played the part. In the 3-D animated movie Luke and Lucy: The Texas Rangers Lucas Van den Eynde was Lambik's voice.

Lambik has a statue in Middelkerke, among other Belgian comic strip characters. It was sculpted by Monique Mol and placed in 2005. It depicts Lambik as he appears on the cover of the album "De Sprietatoom" (1946), in which he made his debut.

Lambik can also be seen as part of an illustrated wall dedicated to "Suske en Wiske" in the Laekenstraat in Brussels, Belgium. It was unveiled on June 15, 1995.
