= Petatje =

Belgian comic strip character, created 1953

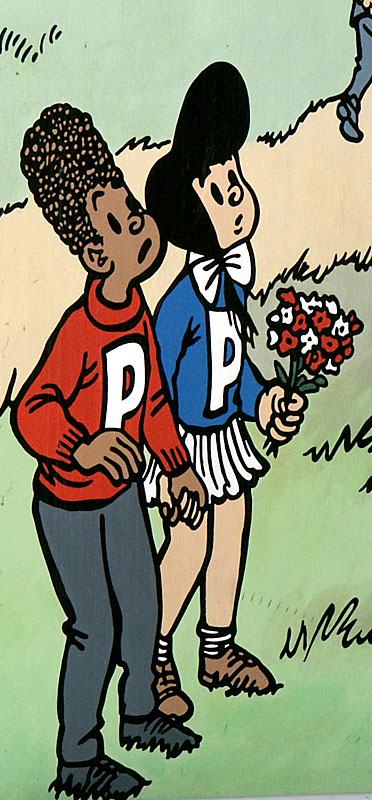
- Petoetje (left) and Petatje (right) depicted on a wall on the Place Saint-Géry/Sint-Goriksplein in Brussels, part of the Brussels' Comic Book Route.

Publication information
- Publisher: Standaard Uitgeverij (Belgium)
- First appearance: The Adventures of Nero: De Ring van Petatje (1953)
- Created by: Marc Sleen

Petatje is a Belgian comics character from the comic strip The Adventures of Nero by Marc Sleen. She is a teenage girl who was adopted by Madam Pheip and Meneer Pheip, along with another orphan child, Petoetje.

== History ==
Petatje debuted in the story De Ring van Petatje (Petatje's Ring, 1953), where she is introduced as a rich girl whose parents have just died. Her aunt Eusebie acts as her guardian, but actually wants to gain Petatje's inherited fortune and therefore tries to murder her. Eventually Petatje does receive her inheritance, but her entire wealth is squandered by Nero in the next album De Hoorn des Overvloeds (The Horn of Dame Fortune, 1953-1954). At first Nero acts as her new guardian, but then Madam Pheip takes this task upon her, seeing that she had already adopted another orphan child of the same age, Petoetje. Petoetje and Petatje become the best of friends.

== Character ==
Petatje has always remained somewhat of a side character. She is a stereotypical curious, panicky and jealous girl, traits which often bring her in trouble. She wears a white skirt, a blue sweater with the letter "P" on it and has two long black braids. In De Prinses van Wataboeng (1995) she plays a more active role and becomes princess of the fictional island Wataboeng.

Petatje's best friend is Petoetje, who is an orphan boy who originates from Papua New Guinea and who is also adopted by Madam Pheip. Their mutual friendship and the fact that they are both orphans who aren't related to one another makes them similar to the characters Suske and Wiske from Willy Vandersteen's comics series Suske en Wiske. As Adhemar took over as a more central character to the series Petoetje and Petatje were reduced to being mere side characters. In many stories they aren't allowed to go on adventure, because they need to go to school. In De Juweleneter (The Jewelry Eater, 1963) they rebel against this and pull off an elaborate scheme where they act like ghosts to scare off the adults. In other stories like De IJzeren Kolonel (The Iron Colonel, 1957), Het Groene Vuur (The Green Fire, 1965), Patati Patata (1972), De P.P. Safari (The P.P. Safari, 1979-1980), De Bibberballon (The Shiver Balloon, 1990) and Het Achtste Wereldwonder (The Eighth Wonder of the World, 1996) they skip school and either travel along with the adults in secret or go on adventures independently.

== In popular culture ==
She is included along with other The Adventures of Nero characters on a bas-relief in Sint-Niklaas, made by sculptor Paul Dekker in 1988 to commemorate Marc Sleen's induction as an honor citizen of the city. A wall on the Place Saint-Géry/Sint-Goriksplein was dedicated to Nero in 1995 and can be visited during the Brussels' Comic Book Route. Petoetje and Petatje are also depicted on this wall. A similar wall was also revealed in the Kloosterstraat in Antwerp in 2014 depicting Nero, Petoetje and Petatje.

== Sources ==
- AUWERA, Fernand, and DE SMET, Jan, "Marc Sleen", Standaard Uitgeverij, 1985.
