= Petoetje =

Belgian comic strip character, created 1950

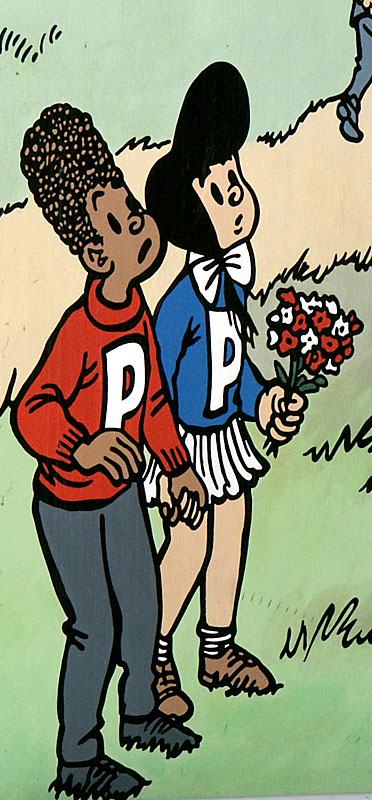
- Petoetje (left) and Petatje (right) depicted on a wall on the Place Saint-Géry/Sint-Goriksplein in Brussels, part of the Brussels' Comic Book Route.

Publication information
- Publisher: Standaard Uitgeverij (Belgium)
- First appearance: The Adventures of Nero: Moea-Papoea (1950)
- Created by: Marc Sleen

Petoetje is a Belgian comics character from the comic strip The Adventures of Nero by Marc Sleen. He is a teenage black boy who originates from Papua New Guinea, but was adopted by Madam Pheip and Meneer Pheip, along with another orphan child, Petatje.

== History ==
Petoetje made his debut in the album Moea-Papoea (1950), where he lives on the island Moea Papoea in the Pacific Ocean. He is the son of local chieftain Papa Papoea. When Nero and his friends visit the island Petoetje is adopted by Madam Pheip. When Petoetje's father wants his son back Nero's magical high hat creates a duplicate of Petoetje who can stay on the island, while Petoetje goes on to live with Madam Pheip.

In the story Het Zevende Spuitje (The Seventh Syringe, 1963) Petoetje temporarily changes into a cannibal after receiving a wrong injection by Adhemar. He returns to his native island, but is later cured and returns to Belgium. In De Daverende Pitteleer (1959) Petoetje meets his aunt Wawa on another isle in the Pacific, while meeting his cousin in Kangoeroe-Eiland (Kangaroo Island, 1961).

In Papa Papoea (1980) Papa Papoea arrives in Belgium to demand that his son returns to his homeland. It's not made clear whatever happened to the duplicate Petoetje. After much discussion it is eventually decided that Petoetje may stay in Belgium to prepare his future role as chieftain. In Doe de Petoe (1994) Papa Papoea returns once again, this time become manager of Petoetje, who has become a pop star. In De Prinses van Wataboeng (The Princess of Wataboeng, 1995) and Kroonprins Petoetje (Crown Prince Petoetje, 2002) - in which Petoetje becomes crown prince of Papa Papoea - Papa Papoea returns a final time.

== Character ==
According to strip 87 of the album De Bronnen van Sing Song Li (The Sources of Sing Song Li, 1951) Petoetje's full name is Abdel Kader Petoetje, which is a nod to the North African cyclist Abdel-Kader Zaaf. Right from his introduction Petoetje is depicted as a very clever boy. In De X-Bom (The X-Bomb, 1955) it turns out he is even a child prodigy, making all kinds of inventions and lecturing at the universities of Oxford, Cambridge and Puyvelde. In that sense he is a predecessor of Nero's later equally genius infant son Adhemar. It is also Petoetje who discovers Adhemar's genius in De Zoon van Nero (Nero's Son, 1959). While Adhemar is genius by birth, Petoetje attributes his intellect to heavy consumption of cichorei. Petoetje is able to speak fluent Russian in De IJzeren Kolonel (The Iron Colonel, 1956–1957), wins a TV quiz in De Granaatslikker (1957) and is able to cite encyclopedic definitions in Het Achtste Wereldwonder (1996).

Petoetje's best friend is Petatje, who is an orphan girl who is also adopted by Madam Pheip in De Ring van Petatje (Petatje's Ring, 1953). Their mutual friendship and the fact that they are both orphans who aren't related to one another makes them similar to the characters Suske and Wiske from Willy Vandersteen's comics series Suske en Wiske. As Adhemar took over as a more central character to the series Petoetje and Petatje were reduced to being mere side characters. In many stories they aren't allowed to go on adventure, because they need to go to school. In De Juweleneter (The Jewelry Eater, 1963) they rebel against this and pull off an elaborate scheme where they act like ghosts to scare off the adults. In other stories like De IJzeren Kolonel (The Iron Colonel, 1957), Het Groene Vuur (The Green Fire, 1965), Patati Patata (1972), De P.P. Safari (The P.P. Safari, 1979–1980), De Bibberballon (The Shiver Balloon, 1990) and Het Achtste Wereldwonder (The Eighth Wonder of the World, 1996) they skip school and either travel along with the adults in secret or go on adventures independently.

Petoetje has had a series of pets over the years. In Moea-Papoea he owns a kangaroo named Sofie, whose pouch he uses to hide and travel in. In Beo de Verschrikkelijke (Beo the Terrible, 1952) he owns a tamed bee, Florenske. In Pol de Pijpegeest (Pol the Pipe Ghost, 1954–1955) Petoetje and Petatje own a dog named Titus.

== Legacy ==
Petoetje is notable for being one of the first black characters in Belgian comics, along with Cirage from Jijé's earlier comic Blondin et Cirage, who may have been an inspiration for the character. In the early stories he was depicted walking around wearing nothing but a straw skirt, even when living in Belgium. Gradually he started wearing more Western clothes and eventually received his familiar outfit: a red sweater with the letter "P" written on it and black pants. His afro-textured hair wasn't that high in early stories, but grew considerably over the years. Despite having a somewhat stereotypical "tribal" look in the early albums Petoetje was always portrayed as a clever, even genius character who spoke normal language.

== In popular culture ==
He is included along with other The Adventures of Nero characters on a bas-relief in Sint-Niklaas, made by sculptor Paul Dekker in 1988 to commemorate Marc Sleen's induction as an honor citizen of the city. A wall on the Place Saint-Géry/Sint-Goriksplein was dedicated to Nero in 1995 and can be visited during the Brussels' Comic Book Route. Petoetje and Petatje are also depicted on this wall. A similar wall was also revealed in the Kloosterstraat in Antwerp in 2014 depicting Nero, Petoetje and Petatje.
