= Typometry =

Typometry may refer to:

- Typometry (archaeology), statistical methods to measure and analyse artifacts
- Typometry (printing), an 18th- and 19th-century technique for composing and printing maps or drawings with moveable type
- Typometry (typography), the measurement of typefaces in typographic units
