= Moerbeke (disambiguation) =

Moerbeke (unofficially known as Moerbeke-Waas) is a municipality in the north of East Flanders, Belgium.

Moerbeke can also refer to:

== Places ==
- Moerbeke, a village in Geraardsbergen, Belgium
- Moerbeke, (original) Dutch name for Morbecque, a municipality in the French Westhoek, France

== Surname ==
- Pierre van Moerbeke (born 1944), Belgian mathematician
- Willem van Moerbeke, a Flemish medieval translator

== Other uses ==
- K.F.C. Moerbeke, football club based in Moerbeke

== See also ==
- Moerbeek, a village in the municipality of Hollands Kroon, Netherlands
