= Meneer Pheip =

Belgian comic strip character, created 1951

Publication information
- Publisher: Standaard Uitgeverij (Belgium)
- First appearance: The Adventures of Nero: De Zwarte Voeten (1951).
- Created by: Marc Sleen

Meneer Pheip is a Flemish comic book character from the Belgian comic strip The Adventures of Nero by Marc Sleen. In the series he is part of Nero's personal circle of friends, despite often being up in arms with him. He is the husband of Madam Pheip, father of Clo-Clo and adoptive father of Petoetje and Petatje.

Meneer Pheip's most notable character trait is the fact that he speaks French.

== Character ==
Meneer Pheip is an obese, middle-aged man with a large moustache. He is very stingy, chauvinistic and prone to aggression. He frequently quarrels with Nero and gets into fights with Abraham Tuizentfloot. Pheip isn't very bright either. He is a frequent victim of Madam Pheip's dominant behaviour. She forces him to do domestic chores and beats him up when he insults her or looks at other women. Despite being a violation of the law of marriage he carries her name instead of the other way around. Madam Pheip also frequently beats him up whenever he insults her or looks at other women. In "De Terugkeer van Geeraard de Duivel" ("The Return of Geeraard de Devil") (1983) she even keeps him close to her by means of a chain. Meneer Pheip has rebelled against his wife's bullying in some stories. In "Mama Kali" (1969) he goes on safari to Tanzania without her. In "De Groene Chinees" ("The Green Chinese") (1955) he is so jealous that he forbids her to go on new adventures with Nero. In "De Zwarte Toren" ("The Black Tower") (1983) he even kidnaps Nero to become the series' new protagonist. The Pheips also kidnap Nero's son Adhemar in "De Zoon van Nero" ("Nero's Son") (1959), out of jealousy over the child's genius.

Meneer Pheip is a rich business man and politician, despite sometimes suffering from a lack of money in later stories. In "De Totentrekkers" ("The Ugly Face Makers") (1970) he is declared bankrupt. In "Het Spook van Zoetendaal" ("The Ghost of Zoetendaal") (1979) he is rich enough again to buy a castle in Zoetendaal. Like many rich people in Belgium during the 1950s Pheip speaks French. He also reads the French-language newspaper "Le Moniteur" and takes his holidays at the Côte d'Azur. When Nero and the Pheips are mountain climbing in "De Pax-Apostel" ("The Pax Apostle") (1958) Nero manages to make Pheip climb quicker and higher than everybody else by telling him to "remember the Six hundred Franchimontois".

The character was inspired by the real-life mayor of Moerbeke, Jean Mariën. Much like Meneer Pheip he too owned a local sugar factory, had a moustache and was short and obese. Some sources claim Maurice Lippens was the main inspiration.

== Character history ==
Meneer Pheip made his debut in "De Zwarte Voeten" ("The Black Feet") (1951) where he is both the owner of a sugar factory as well as the liberal mayor of Moerbeke-Waas. He is obsessed by his party and demands everything, just like his party color, to be blue. During the story extraterrestrial aliens steal his liver, which only seems to cause him temporary pain. Near the end of the tale he marries Madam Pheip. Later in the series the couple adopts Petoetje and Petatje. In "De Groene Gravin" ("The Green Duchess") the Pheips have a son of their own: Clo-Clo.

In "De Gouden Kabouter" ("The Golden Gnome") (1968) Pheip literally goes mad and thinks he is a woodpecker, an eagle and an owl. In "De Dolle Vloot" ("The Mad Fleet") (1976) and "IJskoud Geblaas" ("Ice Cold Blowing") (1995) he thinks he is Napoleon Bonaparte. In "Operatie Koekoek" ("Operation Cuckoo") (1958) Pheip is changed into a little dog and in "Allemaal Beestjes" ("All Kinds of Animals") (1981) into a stork. In "De Groene Slapjanus" ("The Green Weakeling") (1974) Meneer Pheip decides to streak in the middle of the desert, though this occurs off screen.

== Youth, career and other activities ==
In "De Adhemar-Bonbons" ("The Adhemar Pralines") (1990) it is revealed that Pheip resembled Clo-Clo during his youth. In his debut appearance we don't learn his first or last name, but after marrying Madam Pheip everyone refers to him as "Meneer Pheip" ("Mister Pheip"), despite the fact that this is a violation of the law of marriage which insists that a woman takes her husband's name instead of the other way around. His first name is different in many albums: Isidoor, Antoine, Charles-Louis and Oscar In later stories people refer to him as "Philemon" and author Sleen seems to settle on this name.

In "De Zwarte Voeten" ("The Black Feet") (1951) Meneer Pheip is mayor of the Belgian city Moerbeke-Waas in East Flanders. In later stories he is no longer politically active. Only in "De Bende van Lamu" ("Lamu's Gang") (1987) does Madam Pheip ask him to return to politics. Pheip decides to become mayor of Voeren, because "he speaks both national languages". In "De Indiaanse Neusfluit" ("The Indian Nose Whistle") (1987) he succeeds in this ambition, thanks to Adhemar's Dutch language course. This is all a reference to the 1980s José Happart crisis. Pheip even angers Belgian politician Jean Gol with his linguistic knowledge In the next three stories Pheip remains mayor of Voeren.

Meneer Pheip has unsuccessfully tried to master the violin, became an association football referee, champion ski jumping 1958 and studied at the University of Oxford for a year. He also had a common hill myna for a pet and once a kiwi.

== Language ==
Meneer Pheip is notable for his eccentric use of Dutch and French. He often mixes words from both languages and uses French sentence construction. He also frequently translates French and Dutch words literally. Nero is often irritated by Pheip's use of language, wondering when he'll ever master proper Dutch? However, Pheip has succeeded learning Dutch several times. In "Het Zevende Spuitje" ("The Seventh Syringe"), Uitgeverij Het Volk, 1963 Adhemar accidentally makes him speak Algemeen Beschaafd Nederlands by injecting him with an experimental serum. When the serum's power has run out Pheip loses this ability again. Adhemar taught Pheip Dutch twice, failing in "De Groene Gravin" ("The Green Duchess") (1975), but succeeding in "Het Spook van Zoetendaal" ("The Ghost of Zoetendaal") (1980-1981) where Adhemar advised him to read "Taalwenken" by Marc Galle. Because Pheip once again forgets everything he learned by the next story Adhemar teaches him again, with success, in "De Indiaanse Neusfluit" ("The Indian Nose Flute") (1987), but once again Pheip returns to his old, familiar language again by the end of the next story.

Pheip's combination of Dutch and French can be seen as a satirical take on "franskiljons".

== In popular culture ==
He is included along with other Nero characters on a bas-relief in Sint-Niklaas, made by sculptor Paul Dekker in 1988 to commemorate Marc Sleen's induction as an honor citizen of the city. In 1995 a special wall near the Saint-Géry Island in Brussels, celebrating Nero characters and part of the Brussels' Comic Book Route, also included him.

Pheip also received a statue of his own on 24 August 2012. It was sculpted by Guy Du Cheyne and placed in the Statiestraat in Moerbeke-Waas. The statue faces the local sugar factory across the street and stands in front of the local library.
