= 't Vlasbloemeken =

Coordinates: 51°13′31.68″N 3°58′37.64″E

- Interactive map of 't Vlasbloemeken

Restaurant information
- Established: 2005
- Head chef: Eric van Bochoven
- Food type: Regional, vegetarian and French
- Rating: Michelin Guide
- Location: Nieuwstraat 8, Koewacht, 4576 AL, Netherlands
- Seating capacity: 32
- Website: Official website

't Vlasbloemeken is a restaurant located in Koewacht, Netherlands. It is a fine dining restaurant, rewarded with a Michelin star since 2012.

In 2014, GaultMillau awarded the restaurant 15 out of 20 points.

Head chef of 't Vlasbloemeken is Eric van Bochoven.

== See also ==
- List of Michelin-starred restaurants in the Netherlands
