= Stekene =

- Municipality
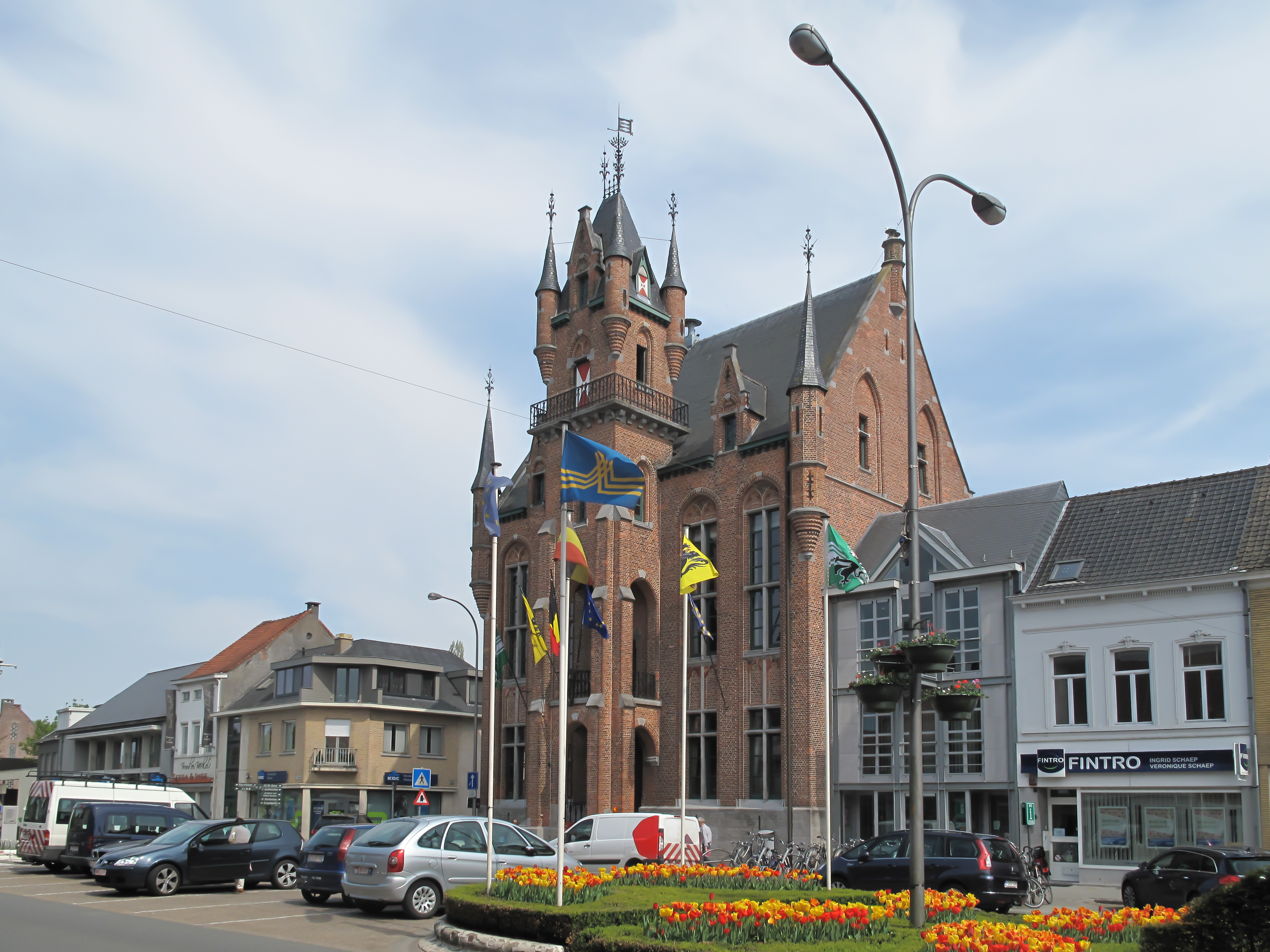

- Flag Coat of arms

- Location of Stekene in East Flanders
- Interactive map of Stekene
- Location in Belgium
- Coordinates: 51°12′N 04°02′E
- Country: Belgium
- Community: Flemish Community
- Region: Flemish Region
- Province: East Flanders
- Arrondissement: Sint-Niklaas

Government
  - Mayor: Stany De Rechter (GE.BE)
  - Governing party: GE.BE

Area
  - Total: 45.26 km^{2} (17.47 sq mi)

Population (2018-01-01)
  - Total: 18,352
  - Density: 405.5/km^{2} (1,050/sq mi)
- Postal codes: 9190
- NIS code: 46024
- Area codes: 03
- Website: www.stekene.be

Stekene (Dutch pronunciation: [ˈsteːkənə]) is a municipality located in the Belgian province of East Flanders. Since 1976, the municipality has comprised the towns of Kemzeke, Klein-Sinaai and Stekene proper. It also includes the village Koewacht. In 2021, Stekene had a total population of 18,863. The total area is 44.80 km^{2}.

Stekene profiles itself as an oasis of green within industrialized Flanders as a large part of its area consists of forests and agricultural lands. The E34 road, from Antwerp to the coast, passes through the municipality and also has its own access to it. Another part of the community is the N403, which connects to Sint-Niklaas.

== Geography ==
The municipality of Stekene is located in the region of Waasland, on the border with the Netherlands, 10 km north-west of Sint-Niklaas and 20 km west of Antwerp. Stekene borders Sint-Gillis-Waas in the east, Sint-Niklaas to the south, Moerbeke to the west and the Dutch town of Hulst to the north. It is 30.4 kilometres (18.9 mi) distant from Antwerp.

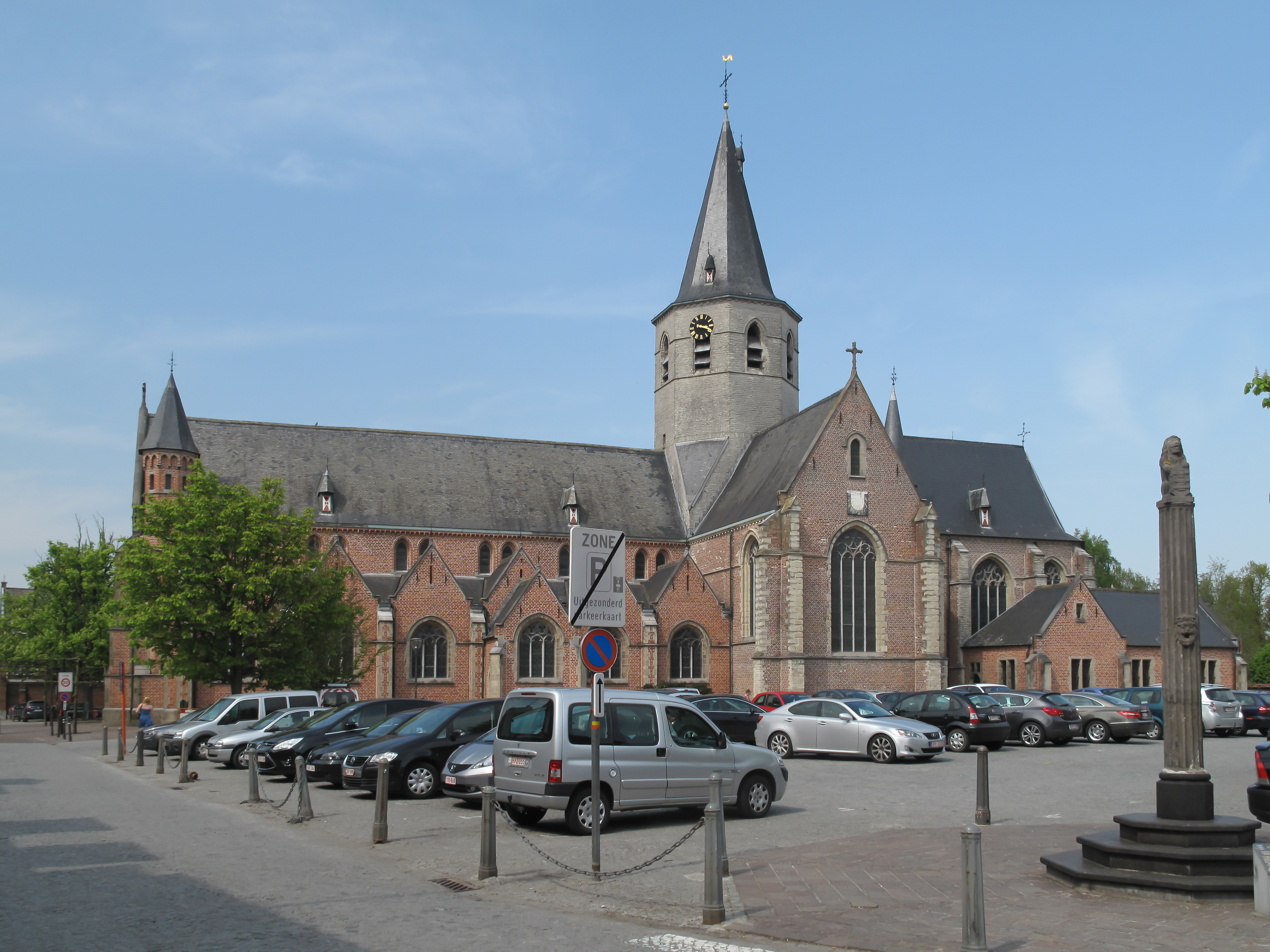
Stekene, church: de Heilige Kruiskerk
