= Kemzeke =

- Village
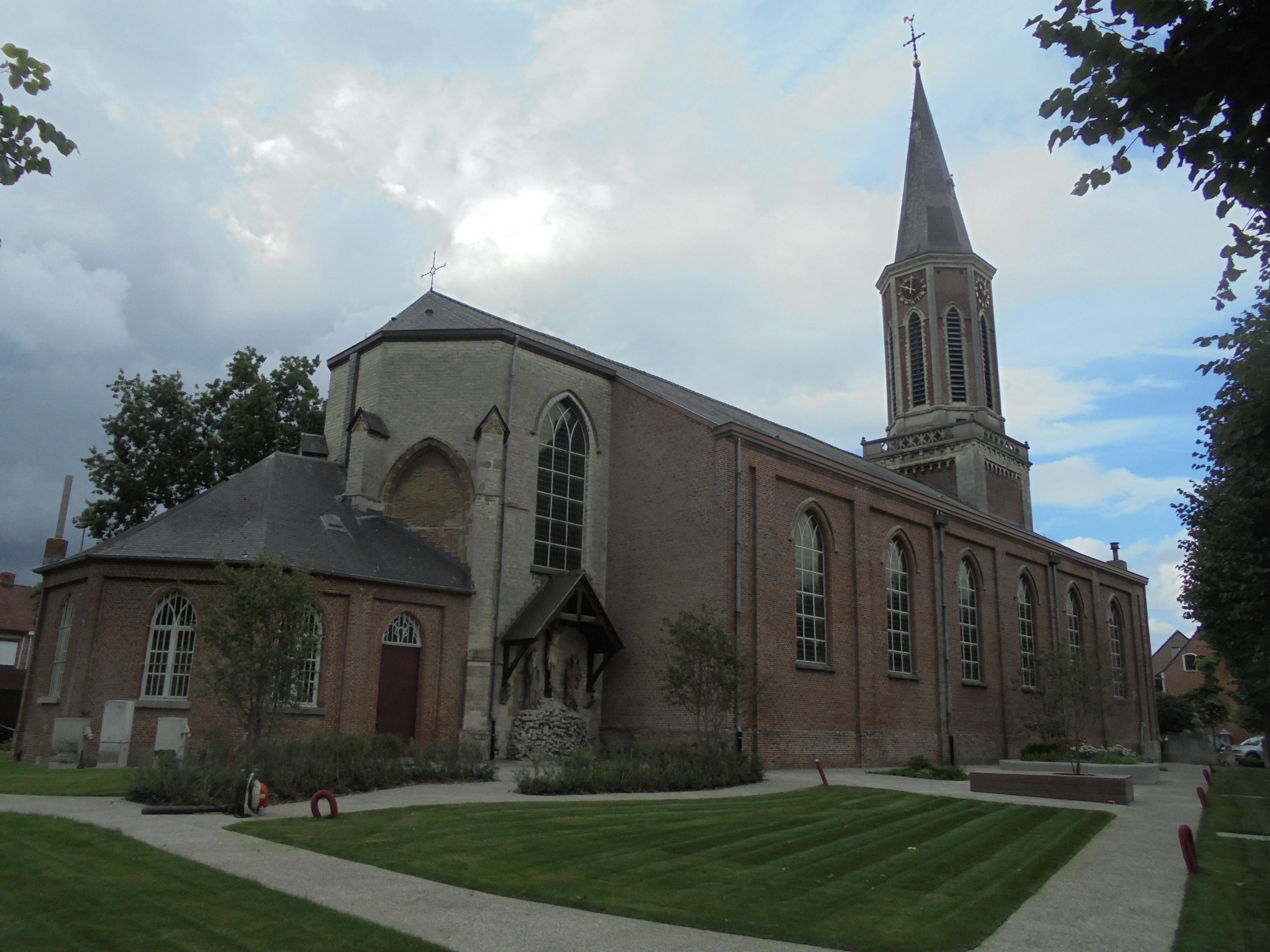
- Sint-Jacobskerk, Kemzeke

- Seal

- Location in Belgium
- Coordinates: 51.2056°N 4.0751°E
- Country: Belgium
- Region: Flemish Region
- Province: East Flanders
- Municipality: Stekene

Area
  - Total: 9.94 km^{2} (3.84 sq mi)

Population (2021)
  - Total: 3,813
  - Density: 384/km^{2} (994/sq mi)
- Time zone: CET

Kemzeke (Dutch pronunciation: [kɛmˈzeːkə]) is a village in the Belgian municipality of Stekene in the province of East-Flanders. Until 1977, it was an independent municipality. It is located between the Dutch border and Sint-Niklaas.

== Overview ==
In 1117, the parish of Kemzeke became independent from Waasmunster. Around 1630, the Sint-Jan fortress was built near Kemzeke as part of the defensive lineage between the Dutch Republic and the Spanish Netherlands. The fortress was never conquered, but was left to deteriorate, and was later dissected by a road during the Austrian period. In 1977, the municipality merged into Stekene except for the hamlet of 't Hol which became part of Sint-Gillis-Waas. The former municipality covered an area of 11.67 square kilometres (4.51 sq mi).

The parish church is known for the veneration of the apostle Saint James, whose relics have been venerated there since the eighteenth century. In 1741, thanks to Cardinal Thomas d'Hénin-Liétard d'Alsace, the church was enriched with a precious relic, which is kept in an eighteenth-century wooden reliquary made by Egidius Adriaan Nys. The relic was canonically authenticated by Philippus Spada, Archbishop of Theodosia and auxiliary bishop to the papal throne.

A new lower church was built in 1847, designed by Jan De Somme-Servais in an early Neo-Gothic style.

Eddy Merckx rode his last cycling race in Kemzeke, in which he finished 12th.

== Verbeke Foundation ==
Shrine of Saint-James, Church of Kemzeke

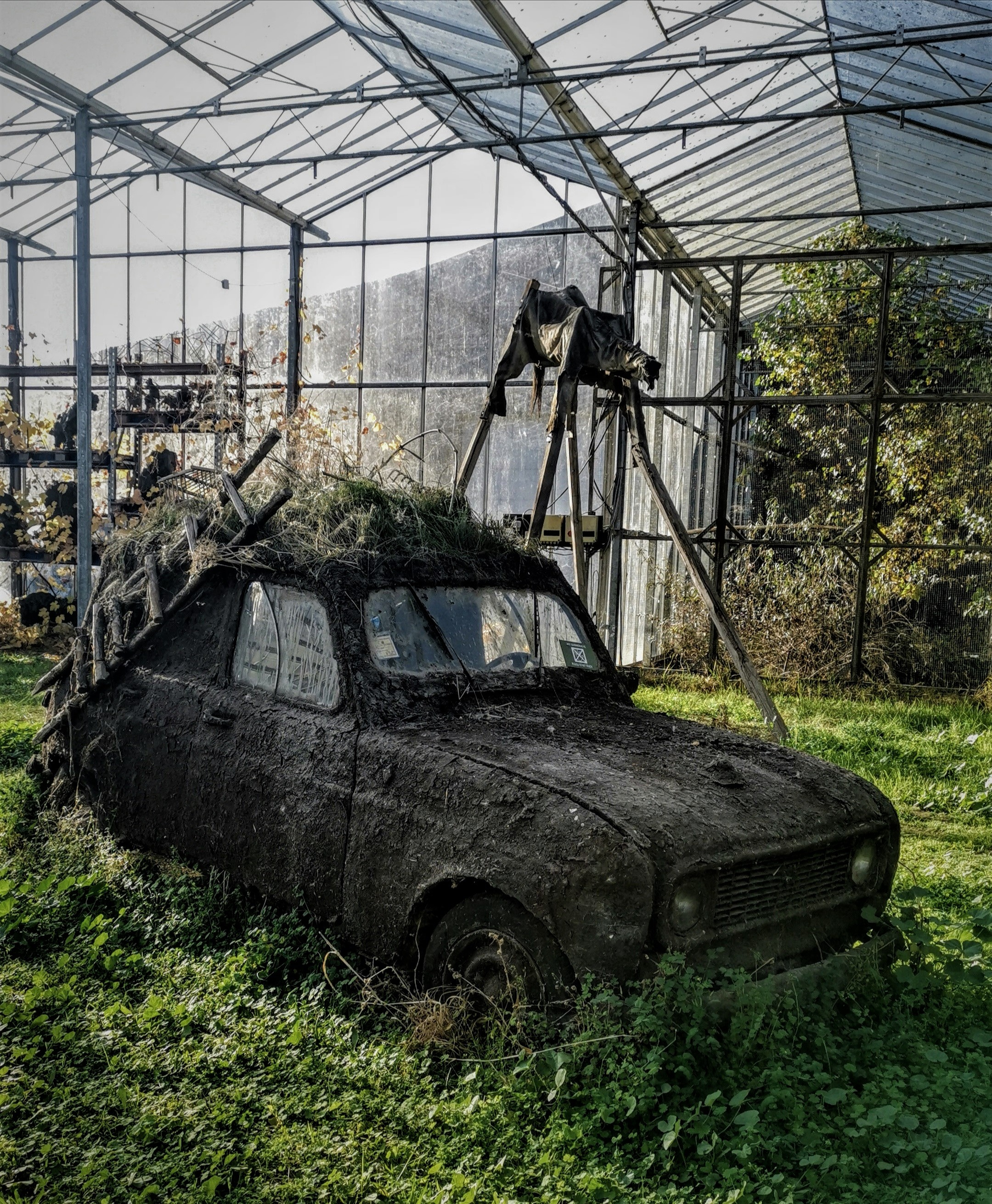
Earthcar by Peter De Cupere

The Verbeke Foundation is a privately owned museum of modern and contemporary art. It is owned by Geert Verbeke, an art collector. It contains a 12 hectares nature area and 20,000 square metres of buildings making it one of the largest private contemporary art in Europe, and is home to residential artists.

== Nature ==
The nature reserve De Gavers consists of wetlands. The area around the Gavermeer is an important bird refuge. The reserve includes a seven hectares arboretum which contains more than 170 species of trees.
