= Adhemar (comic book character) =

Publication information
- Publisher: Standaard Uitgeverij (Belgium)
- First appearance: The Adventures of Nero: De Zoon van Nero (1959)
- Created by: Marc Sleen

Adhemar is a Flemish comic book character. He is the son of Nero in the eponymous Belgian comic strip series The Adventures of Nero by Marc Sleen and one of the main protagonists. He is a child prodigy who is both a professor as well as an inventor. His full title is doctor professor Adhemar. He is easily recognizable due to his mortarboard and tuxedo.

The Belgian comic book award Bronzen Adhemar has been named after him.

== Debut ==
Adhemar made his debut in De Zoon van Nero ("The Son of Nero") (1959), in which he is also born. He surprises his parents and all other people present by being able to talk, smoke a pipe, drink beer and choose his own name. When Nero takes him to the child benefit office he convinces the man behind the counter to raise the money. Later in the story Adhemar wants to leave to see something of the world, but is halted by Petoetje, adoptive son of Meneer and Madam Pheip. He introduces Adhemar to science, which will become his major hobby in the course of the series. Adhemar invents a new petroleum device in the story and strikes oil in their garden, which causes Nero to get rich and convince him that Adhemar's genius ought to be stimulated.

Adhemar had a few predecessors in the series. In the very first Nero album, Het Geheim van Matsuoka ("The Secret of Matsuoka") (1947-1948) Nero is portrayed with a son and daughter on his knee. In later prints they are changed into his nephews. In Het Rattenkasteel ("The Rat Castle") (1948) Nero is seen with another son, this time a baby with a pacifier, but the child is not referred to again in the story, nor the rest of the series. Petoetje, Madam Pheip's adopted son, can also be seen as a prototype of Adhemar. He is very clever and in "De X-Bom" ("The X Bomb") (1955) he is revealed to be a genius inventor and scientist. He reveals that he became intelligent by eating a lot of witlof, while Adhemar gained it by birth. Petoetje was the one who first discovered Adhemar's genius in "De Zoon van Nero" ("The Son of Nero") (1959), when he let him play in his laboratory.

== Character ==
In his first twelve albums Adhemar was dressed as a baby, walking around with a napkin around his neck and carrying a diaper. He acted more like an infant at times, by crying extremely loud when things don't go his way. In "De Kille Man Djaro" ("The Cold Man Djaro") (1962) he also cries because he is scared to cross a crocodile infested lake and in "De Brollebril" ("The Bogus Glasses") (1962) he wets his pants after a parachute jump. From "De Juweleneter" ("The Jewel Eeater") (1963) on he wears a tuxedo and his characteristic baret appears in "Het Groene Vuur" ("The Green Fire") (1966). He loses most of his childlike traits too, despite never aging beyond the age of five. In "De Adhemar Bonbons" ("The Adhemar Pralines") (1989) he reveals that he eats pralines that stop his ageing process.

In some stories Adhemar returns to his childish state of mind, like "Het Zevende Spuitje" ("The Seventh Syringe") (1963) or "De Wallabieten" ("The Wallabytes") (1968), but most of the times he is the most adult of all the characters. He is a sceptic who will doubt all instances of magic, wizardry or fantastic elements and claim, in his trademark catch phrase: "Het is wetenschappelijk niet verantwoord" ("It's scientifically not possible"). In most cases he turns out to be right, but occasionally certain phantasy creatures do turn out to exist after all.

Despite his high I.Q. Adhemar does sometimes makes human errors or turns out to be fallible. His inventions sometimes fail or his laboratory explodes. Some of this failings also lead to new adventures, for instance in "Het Zevende Spuitje" or "Aboe-Markoeb" (1966). In "De Witte Parel" ("The White Pearl") (1962) he is humiliated on television when it turns out he doesn't know any nursery rhymes during a quiz. He decides to go to kindergarten to extinguish this hole in his knowledge.

Many scientists and professors know and admire Adhemar. In "Het Bobobeeldje" ("The Bobo Statue") (1965) we see a signed photograph of Albert Einstein with the message "To my dear friend Adhemar", despite the fact that Einstein died in 1955, four years before Adhemar's birth in the series. Due to Adhemar's genius several people and foreign regimes sometimes abduct him to force him to work for them. Some professors try to murder him out of jealousy.

In "De Blauwe Mannen" ("The Blue Men") (1969) Adhemar turns out to be a fan of Benjamin Britten, Leon Cavallo, Leonard Bernstein, the Festival van Vlaanderen, Ludwig van Beethoven and Wolfgang Amadeus Mozart. In "Nerorock" (1990) he also admits liking pop music, including Jive Bunny & The Mastermixers, The Rolling Stones, Don Henley, Tears For Fears, Leo Fabri, Milli Vanilli, Kylie Minogue, Helmut Lotti and Simple Minds.

== Child prodigy ==
Adhemar's main character trait is his high intelligence. In De Brollebril ("The Bogus Glasses") (1960) his parents send him to a boarding school, but he returns early, claiming he got his degree early. In the same story he gets his own laboratory. From the album "Ottoman de Veertiende" ("Ottoman the Fourteenth") (1974) his lab is located in Kobbegem. In "De Orde van de Wellustige Wezel" ("The Order of the Lustful Weasel") (1984) he also has a lab and rocket platform in the gardens of Nero's new castle in Oostkerke.

Adhemar teaches at several universities, including the University of Oxford, the University of Cambridge and the University of Upsala. He has won the Nobel Prize and speaks 36 languages fluently. In "Het Groene Vuur" ("The Green Fire") (1965) he makes a trip throughout the USA as an advanced fellow of the Belgian American Educational Foundation. He teaches in German philology, trigonometry, nuclear physics, dynamics, chemical equations, typometry, geomontography, aerial photography and geography. In "De Matras van Madras" ("The Mattress of Madras") (1967) we also learn he has three doctor titles in philology, philosophy and nuclear physics and also holds own as doctor honoris causa. Apart from that he is also a biologist, ornithologist and botanist In "Baraka" (1986) he travels to Chernobyl to "extinguish the fire".

Adhemar often puts his intelligence in advantage to the US government. In "De Brollebril" (1960) he sells it for 50.000 dollar. In "De Driedubbelgestreepte" ("The Three Double Striped One") (1962) the Americans want to use him in the space race against Soviet Russia, an act for which he receives a medal in "De Paarse Futen" ("The Purple Great crested grebes" (1967) after he magically sends two American astronauts to the moon with a wand. In "De Juweleneter" ("The Jewel Eater") (1963) Adhemar works for The Pentagon to create a new fuel. The European Defence Agency also hires him in "Hoed je voor Kastar" ("Beware of Kastar") (1973). Adhemar does sometimes work for the Belgian government as well. In "Het Kwade Oog" ("The Evil Eye") (1974-1975) he prepares an anti-inflation file for the Prime Minister.

== Political career ==
Usually Adhemar acts more like a consultant to governments or offers his inventions to leaders of the West, but in "De Kromme Cobra" ("The Crooked Cobra") (1964) he becomes Prime Minister of the Indian state Rachepour.

== Cultural status ==
As one of the most recognizable Flemish comic book characters Adhemar has penetrated Flemish popular culture in many ways. The annual comic book award Bronzen Adhemar has been named after him and is a small statue modelled after his likeness. In Turnhout, where the prize is traditionally handed out, he also received a statue near De Warande in 1991. It was designed by sculptor Ivo van Damme. On 5 September 2016 the statue was victim of vandalism and pushed of its plint, but quickly put back again the next day. A book store in Gent has been named after him too

He is included along with other Nero characters on a bas-relief in Sint-Niklaas, made by sculptor Paul Dekker in 1988 to commemorate Marc Sleen's induction as an honor citizen of the city. In 1995 a special wall near the Saint-Géry Island in Brussels celebrating Nero characters, also included him.
