= Madam Pheip =

Belgian comic strip character, created 1950

Publication information
- Publisher: Standaard Uitgeverij (Belgium)
- First appearance: The Adventures of Nero: De Hoed van Geeraard de Duivel (1950).
- Created by: Marc Sleen

Madam Pheip is a character from the Flemish comic strip The Adventures of Nero by Marc Sleen. In the series she is one of Nero 's personal friends and married to Meneer Pheip, with whom she has one child, Clo-Clo. Madam Pheip also adopted two children, Petoetje, and Petatje.

Madam Pheip's main distinguishable trait is the fact that she smokes a pipe, as her name implies. Due to her man-wife tendencies she has become one of the most popular characters in the franchise.

== Character ==
Madam Pheip is a strong and dominant middle aged woman. She is very impulsive and immediately takes charge in any problematic situation. Whenever her children are in danger she will protect them at all cost. Her henpecked husband, Meneer Pheip, is forced into submission. Despite being a violation of the law of marriage he carries her name instead of the other way around. Madam Pheip also frequently beats him up whenever he insults her or looks at other women. In "De Terugkeer van Geeraard de Duivel" ("The Return of Geeraard de Devil") (1983) she even keeps him close to her by means of a chain. A good example of Madam Pheip's woman power is that she is the only feminist who remains true to her ideals after the story "De Dolle Dina's" ("The Looney Dina's") (1970) ends.

She is a close friend of Nero's wife, Madam Nero, with whom she frequently goes shopping and enjoys jabbering while having coffee. Still, they often get into arguments and there is some rivalry between the Neros and the Pheips. In "De Zoon van Nero" ("Nero's Son") (1959) the Pheip even kidnap Nero's genius son, Adhemar out of jealousy, but feel remorse near the end and bring him back. In "De Terugkeer van Geeraard de Duivel" ("The Return of Geeraard the Devil") (1983) Meneer Pheip arranges Nero to be kidnapped because he is jealous that Madam Pheip often goes on adventure with Nero while he is forced to stay home. Still, both families always make up together to celebrate the traditional waffle feast near the end of each story.

== Pipe smoking ==
Madam Pheip's most colourful character trait is the fact that she is a woman who smokes pipe. She is such a professional smoker that she can produce smoke curtains. In "Het Vredesoffensief van Nero" ("Nero's Peace Initiative") (1951-1952) it is revealed that she is a member of the V.V.V.P. ("Flemish Organisation of Pipe Addicts"). Her addiction has one major downside. Every ten minutes she has to catch her breath. Madam Pheip has tried to quit smoking twice, but always fell back into her old bad habits.

She only smokes the brand "fleur de matras", but in the stories "Moea-Papoea" (1950), "De Bronnen van Sing Song Li" ("The Sources of Sing Song Li") (1952), "De Matras van Madras" ("The Mattress of Madras") (1967) and "Hannibal" (1977) she smokes more heavy stuff, such as tropical snake root, opium, Indian hemp, ... which causes her to hallucinate.

== Background ==
Marc Sleen based Madam Pheip on a woman he encountered during his youth. She worked in a washing salon in Sint-Niklaas and was very intimidating towards other people. She wore trousers and smoked a pipe. Sleen remembered being scared of her as a child.

== Character history ==
Madam Pheip made her debut in the story "De Hoed van Geeraard de Duivel" ("Geeraard the Devil's Hat") (1950) where she visits Nero in the hospital. Nero is under threat of Geeraard de Devil who wants to steal his magical hat. Madam Pheip advises Nero to start pipe smoking which, according to her, scares the Devil away because it reminds him of Hell. Sure enough her advice works and later in the story she travels along with Nero to India. Near the end of the story a maharadja wants to marry her but she declines since he has a harem.

In the next story, "Moea Papoea" (1950) Nero and Madam Pheip travel to Papua New Guinea. On the fictitious island Moea-Papoea she adopts Petoetje, a small native boy, as her own child. She finally finds a husband in the story that follows, "De Zwarte Voeten" ("The Black Feet") (1950), where she meets the mayor of Moerbeke-Waas, who also owns a sugar factory. By the end of the story they marry and he takes her name as Meneer Pheip. Five stories later, in "De Ring van Petatje" ("Petatje's ring") (1952) Nero adopts the orphan Petatje, but one story later it turns out Madam Pheip has taken over the adoption. When Nero and his wife receive their own son, Adhemar, in "De Zoon van Nero" ("Nero's Son") (1959) Meneer and Madam Pheip become Adhemar's godparents. In "De Groene Gravin" ("The Green Duchess") (1975) the Pheips finally have a son of their own, Clo-Clo.

Madam Pheip was turned into a gold statue in "De Hoorn des Overvloeds" ("Horn of Plenty") (1953-1954), but changed back again in the next story "De Ark van Nero" ("Nero's Ark") (1953). In "Mama Kali" (1969) she is changed into an African elephant and in "Allemaal Beestjes" ("All kinds of animals") (1981) into a hare. Another physical transformation was caused on her own initiative in "Het Geheim van Bakkendoen" ("Bakkendoen's Secret") (1957-1958), "De Sluikslapers" ("The Squatters") (1970) and "De V-Machine" ("The V-Machine") (1979), where she loses weight spectacularly, but always becomes chubby again.

In the "Nero" stories of the 1950s Madam Pheip was a prominent main character. Later in the series she appears on a less recurring basis, usually because she and her family are taking a holiday at the Côte d'Azur.

== Youth and family ==
Madam Pheip has an uncle, Roger, who once shot an elephant in Congo. In "De Adhemar Bonbons" (1989) ("The Adhemar Pralines") we get a view of what she may have looked like as a child. Her first name, Katrien, is revealed in "Windkracht 2000" ("Beaufort Scale 2000") (1999).

== In popular culture ==
She is included along with other Nero characters on a bas-relief in Sint-Niklaas, made by sculptor Paul Dekker in 1988 to commemorate Marc Sleen's induction as an honor citizen of the city. In 1995 a special wall near the Saint-Géry Island in Brussels, celebrating Nero characters and part of the Brussels' Comic Book Route, also included her.
