= Gaugericus =

6th and 7th-century Merovingian bishop and saint

Saint Gaugericus
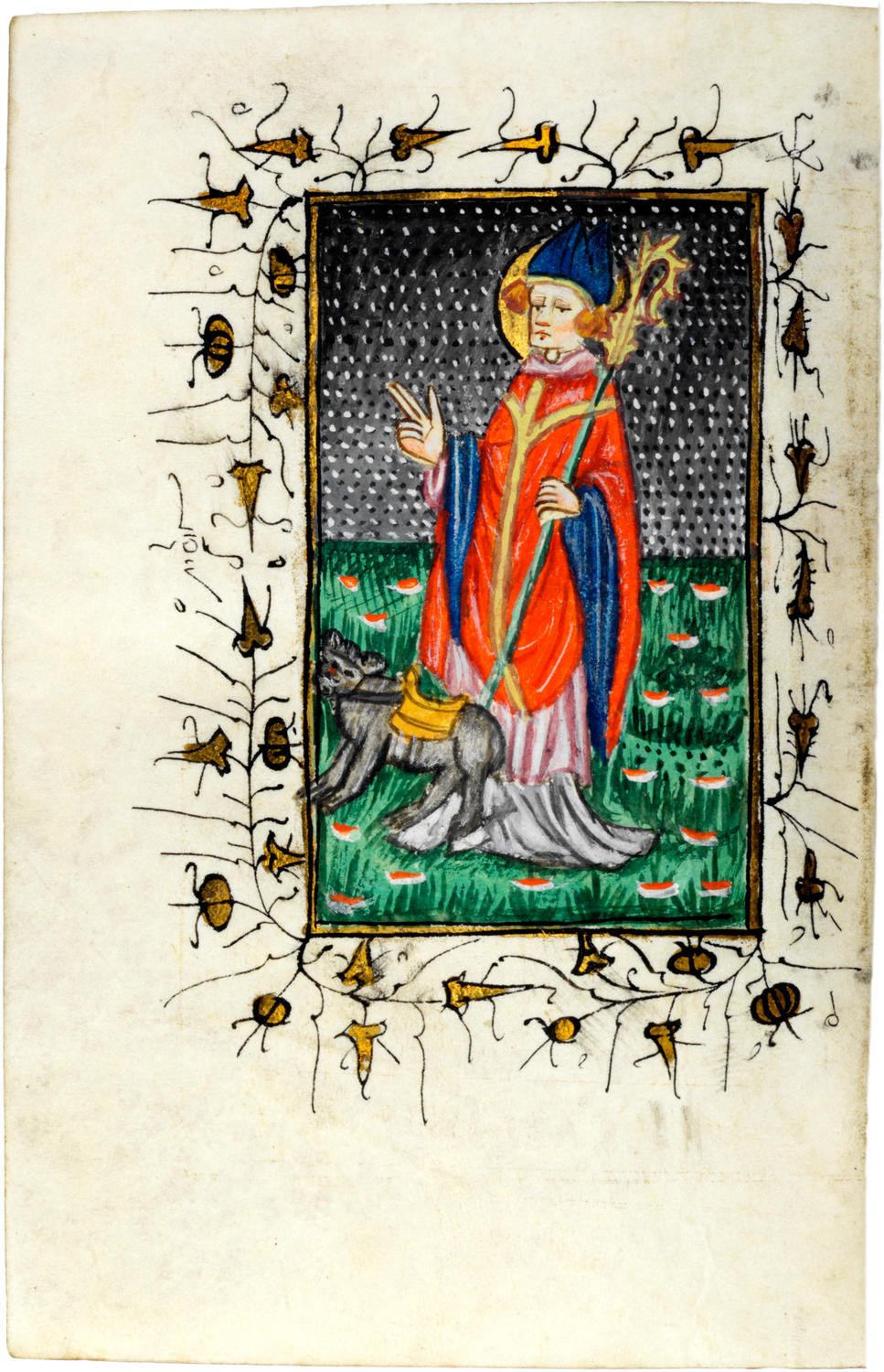
- Gaugericus in a 15th century manuscript

Bishop
- Born: c. 550
- Died: August 11, 619
- Venerated in: Roman Catholic Church; Eastern Orthodox Church
- Major shrine: Church of St-Getry, Cambrai
- Feast: August 11; 18 November for the exhumation of his relics; 24 September for the translation of his relics
- Attributes: bishop, mitre on head, without his crosier, right hand lifted in a gesture of benediction and left folded upon his breast.
- Patronage: Cambrai; Brussels; Braine-le-Comte

Saint Gaugericus, in French Saint Géry (also known as Gorik, Gau; in Walloon, Djèri) (c. 550 – August 11, 619) was a bishop of Cambrai, France.

== Biography ==
He was born to Roman parents, Gaudentius and Austadiola, at Eposium (present Carignan). Tradition states that Bishop Magnerich, successor of Saint Nicetas as Bishop of Trier, was so impressed with the piety of the young man that he ordained him deacon, but not before Gaugericus had memorized the entire psalter. Magnerich entrusted Gaugericus with the pastoral care of the city of Cambrai.

=== Bishop ===
When the see of Cambrai-Arras fell vacant around 585, Gaugericus was elected bishop with the consent of Childebert II. Gaugericus was consecrated by Egidius, bishop of Reims. Bishop Géry devoted himself to fighting paganism, ransoming captives and visiting rural districts and villae. Gaugericus founded churches and abbeys, including a monastery dedicated to St. Medard, to host relics, which contributed powerfully to giving Cambrai both the appearance and functions of a city.

He himself went on pilgrimage to the tomb of Saint Martin in Tours. Géry also built a church dedicated to Saint Martin, where he had relics of this saint deposited. The bell tower of this church was to become, much later, the city's belfry. His work was crucial to the development of the city, particularly in terms of the number of buildings he left behind and the pilgrimages he attracted.

Between 584 and 590, he transferred the episcopal see from Arras to Cambrai. He maintained close relations with King Chlothar II, the new lord of Cambrai after the death of Childebert, and assisted at the Council of Paris in 614.

=== Traditions ===
According to tradition, around the year 580 Gaugericus built a chapel on the largest island in the Senne near Brussels. Saint-Géry Island is named after the church.

A legend holds that Géry built a chapel (to Saint Michael, later the Cathedral of St. Michael and St. Gudula), which soon became a church and gave birth to the city of Brussels, from which he had chased a dragon whose lair was located where the impasse de la Poupée (formerly the impasse du Dragon) was later built.

== Veneration ==
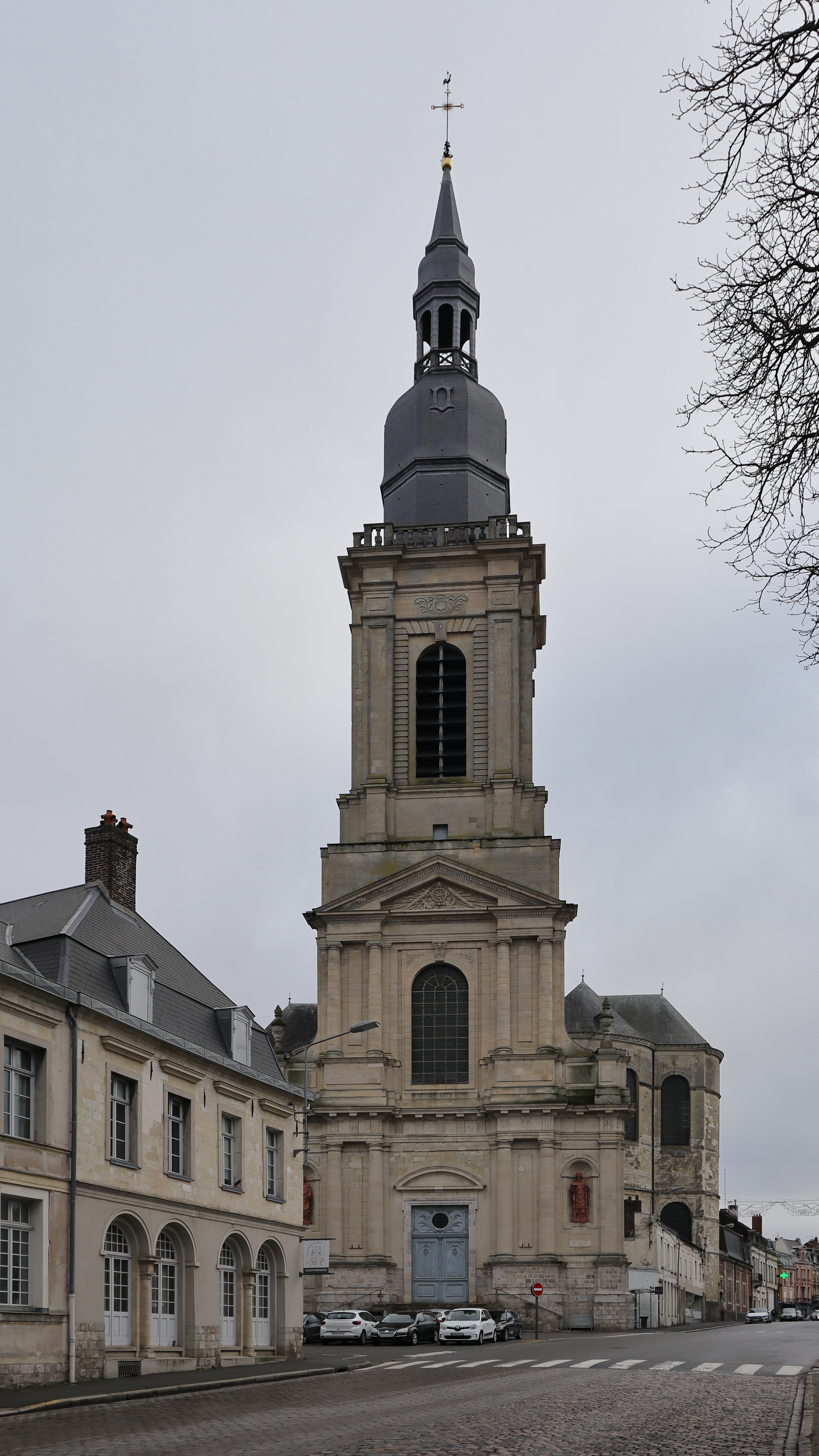
St. Géry church at Cambrai

After serving as bishop for thirty-nine years, he died August 11, 619 and was buried in the church of Saint Médard, which he had founded at Cambrai. Veneration commenced immediately after his death.

His feast day is mentioned in the martyrology of Rabanus Maurus for August 11.

=== Relics ===
When the church of Saint Medard was demolished by the emperor Charles V for the building of the citadel, the canons were removed, and took with them the relics of the saint, to the old church of Saint Vedast, which from that time has borne the name of Saint Gery. The Church of Saint-Géry is one of the oldest in Cambrai, and a listed historical monument since 1919.

Relics of the saint were given to Carignan, to the church of Saint-Géry in Valenciennes, to the abbey of Saint-Sépulcre in Cambrai, which became a cathedral after the destruction of the old one after the Revolution, to the abbey of Arras, to the abbey of Liessies, to the collegiate church of Saint-Pierre in Douai, to the church of Saint-Donat in Bruges, to the church of Saint-Géry in Bierne, and to the church of Saint-Géry in Brussels8. His reliquary is still on display in the south transept of the church of Saint-Géry in Cambrai.

=== Patronage ===
During his wanderings he freed many prisoners, criminals, children taken into slavery. St-Géry is the patron of Cambrai, and of prisoners.

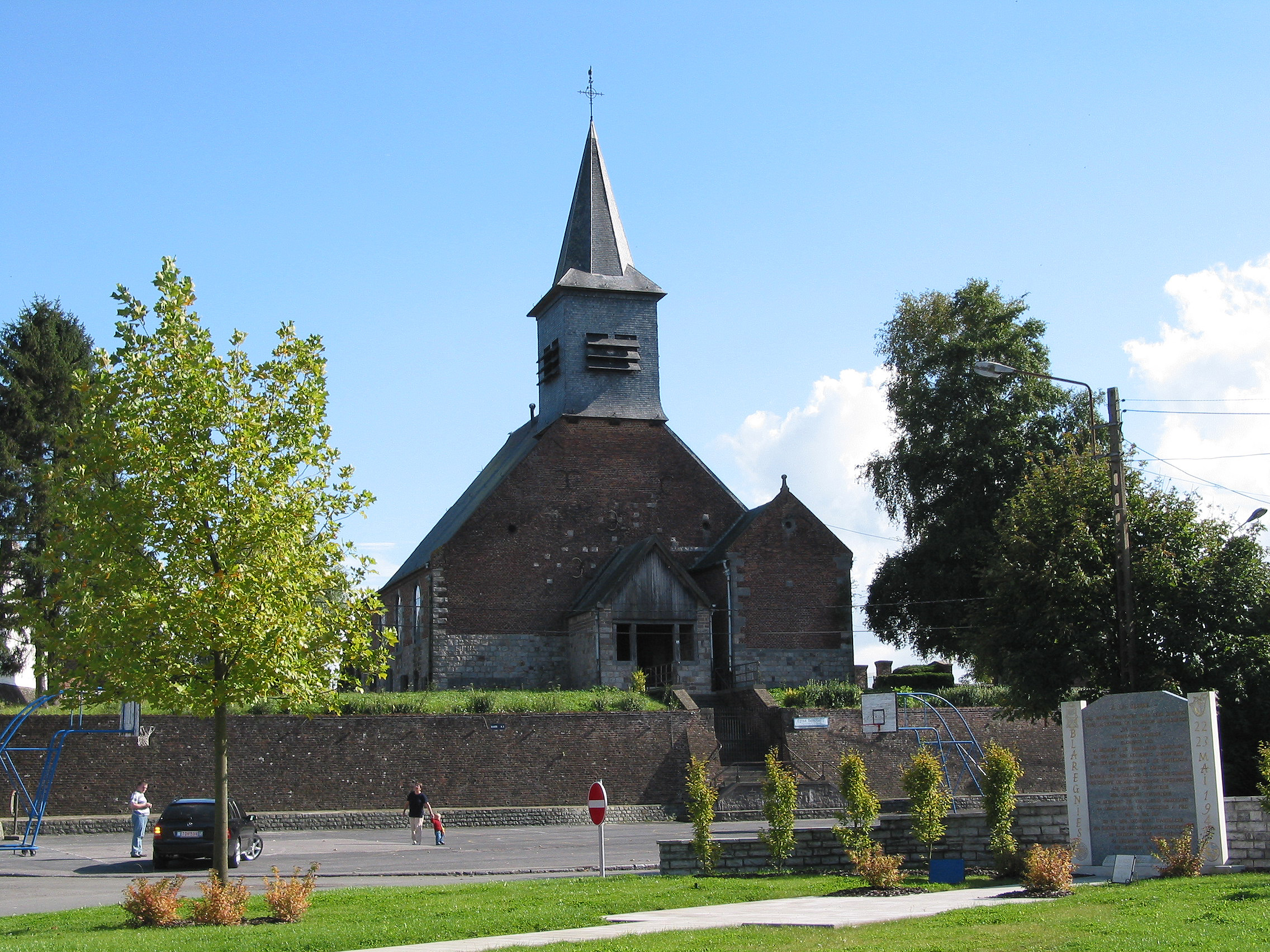
St. Géry church at Blaregnies

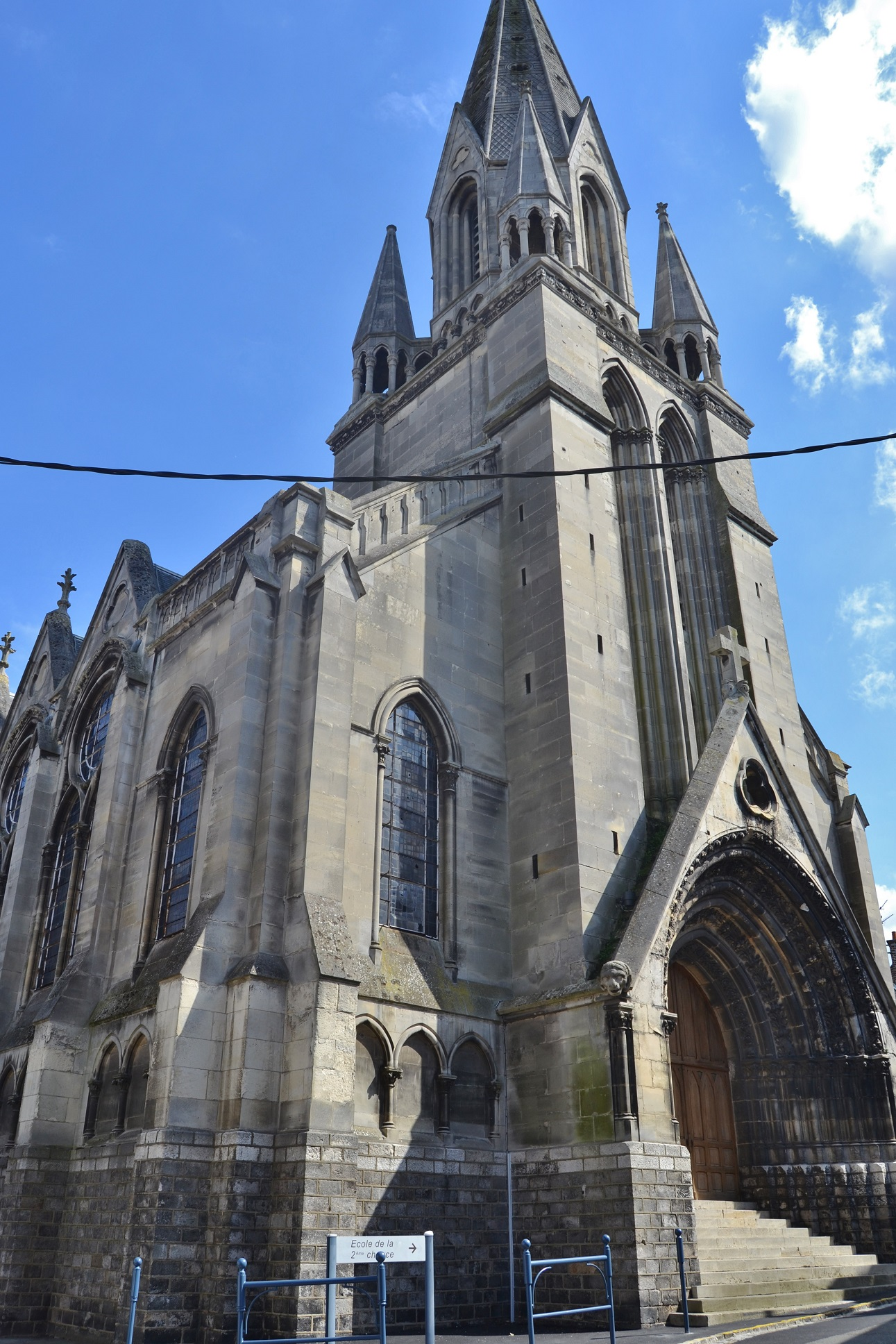
Church of St. Géry, Arras

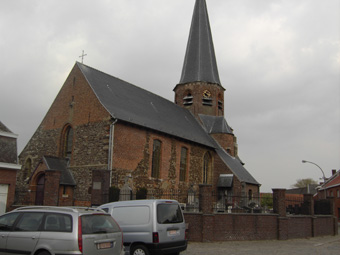
Church of Saint Gaugericus in Sint-Goriks-Oudenhove

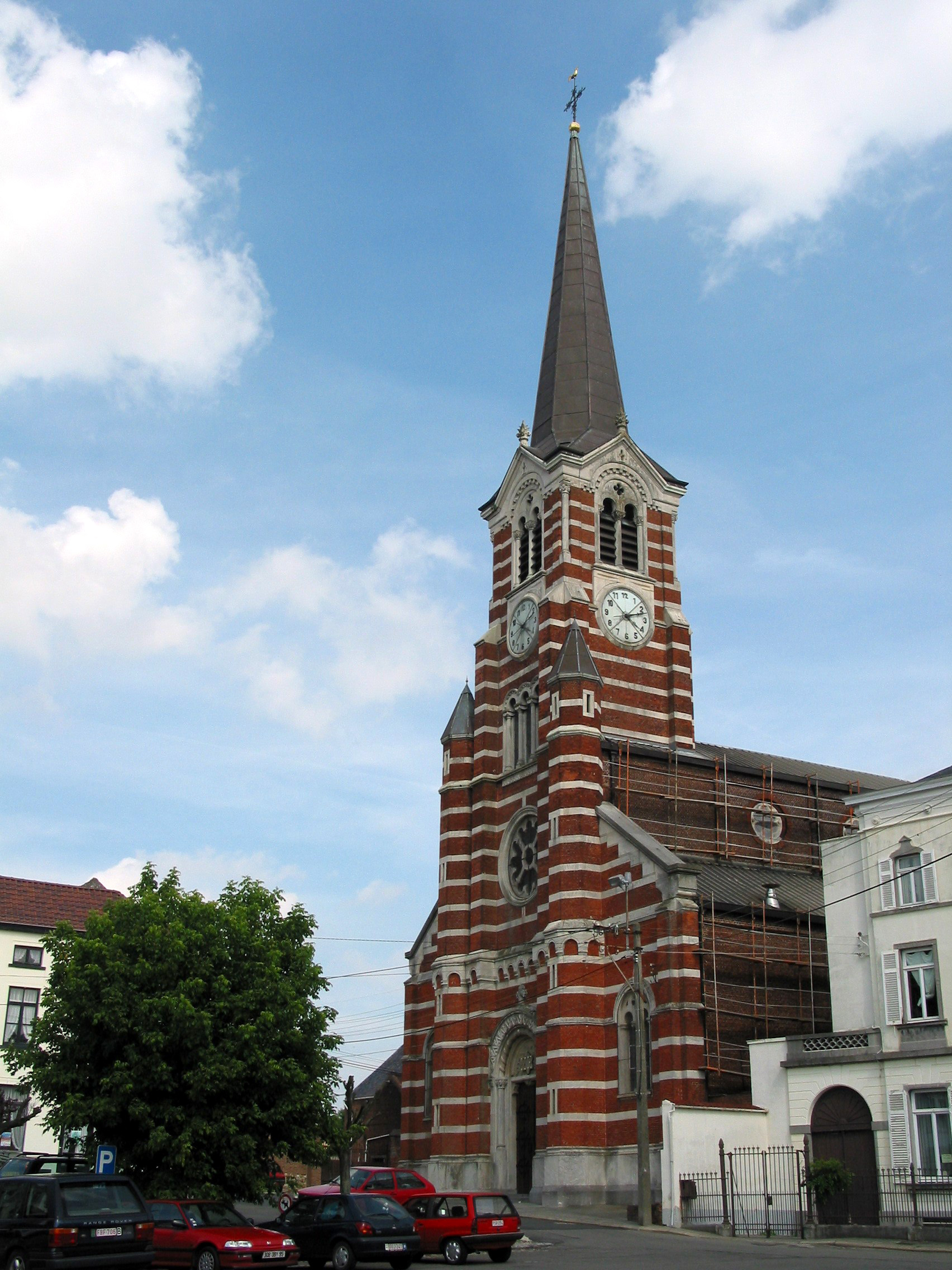
St. Gaugericus' church, Rebecq, Belgium
