= Typometry (archaeology) =

Measurement and analysis of artifacts by various methods

Typometry in archaeology is the measurement and analysis of artifacts by various methods with metric measurements including length, width, surface area, cutting planes, hafting axis and others. Typometric data is taken along with other criteria including typological, functional, and stylistic criteria, in examination of archaeological finds. The use of computers and mathematics in archaeology, and in particular of automated statistical analysis, have participated in the development of this field. In 1953, Albert Spaulding published the first statistical method for typometry.
