= KFC Moerbeke =

Belgian football club

- Full name: Koninklijke Football Club Moerbeke
- Nickname: Suikerjongens [Sugar Boys]
- Founded: 1 April 1927
- Ground: Stadium KFC Moerbeke
- Chairman: Patrick Notteboom
- Manager: Marnix Leybaert
- League: 2nd Provincial Division
Home colours	Away colours

KFC Moerbeke (further shortened to KFCM) is a Belgian football club based in Moerbeke. The club is member of the Royal Belgian Football Association with the matricule number 2990. The main coulours are white and green. The club plays with a relatively large number of homegrown players, increasing the number of paying spectators at home and away.

== History ==
=== 20th century: foundation and stability ===
KFC Moerbeke was founded on 1 April 1927. For many years, it was a steady staple in the lowest tier 4th Provincial Division with short interludes in the 3rd Provincial.

=== 21st century: 2nd Provincial Division ===
In 2007, Moerbeke won another 4th Division section championship. In 2011, the club won a championship in the 3rd Provincial Division, after a 1–0 victory over HRS Haasdonk, promoting KFC to the 2nd Provincial Division.

In 2018, chairman André De Keyser was replaced by Patrick Notteboom. Since 2019, Moerbeke's main field is an artificial turf.

KFC started the 2019–2020 season with large victories over VKS Hamme Zogge (2–7) and Herleving Sint Pauwels (4–1). In 2022, Moerbeke failed to return to the 2nd Provinciale after a last round 1–5 defeat against SK Lochristi. In 2023, it returned to the 2nd Provincial Division.

== Associated people ==
=== Head coach ===
- Dirk De Backer (2010–2012)
- Johan Van Rumst (2012–2014)
- Marnix Leybaert (201?–)

=== Notable players ===
- Robin Buyck
- Kor Notteboom

=== Chairs ===
- André De Keyser (–2018)
- Patrick Notteboom (2018–)
