= Koewacht =

- Village
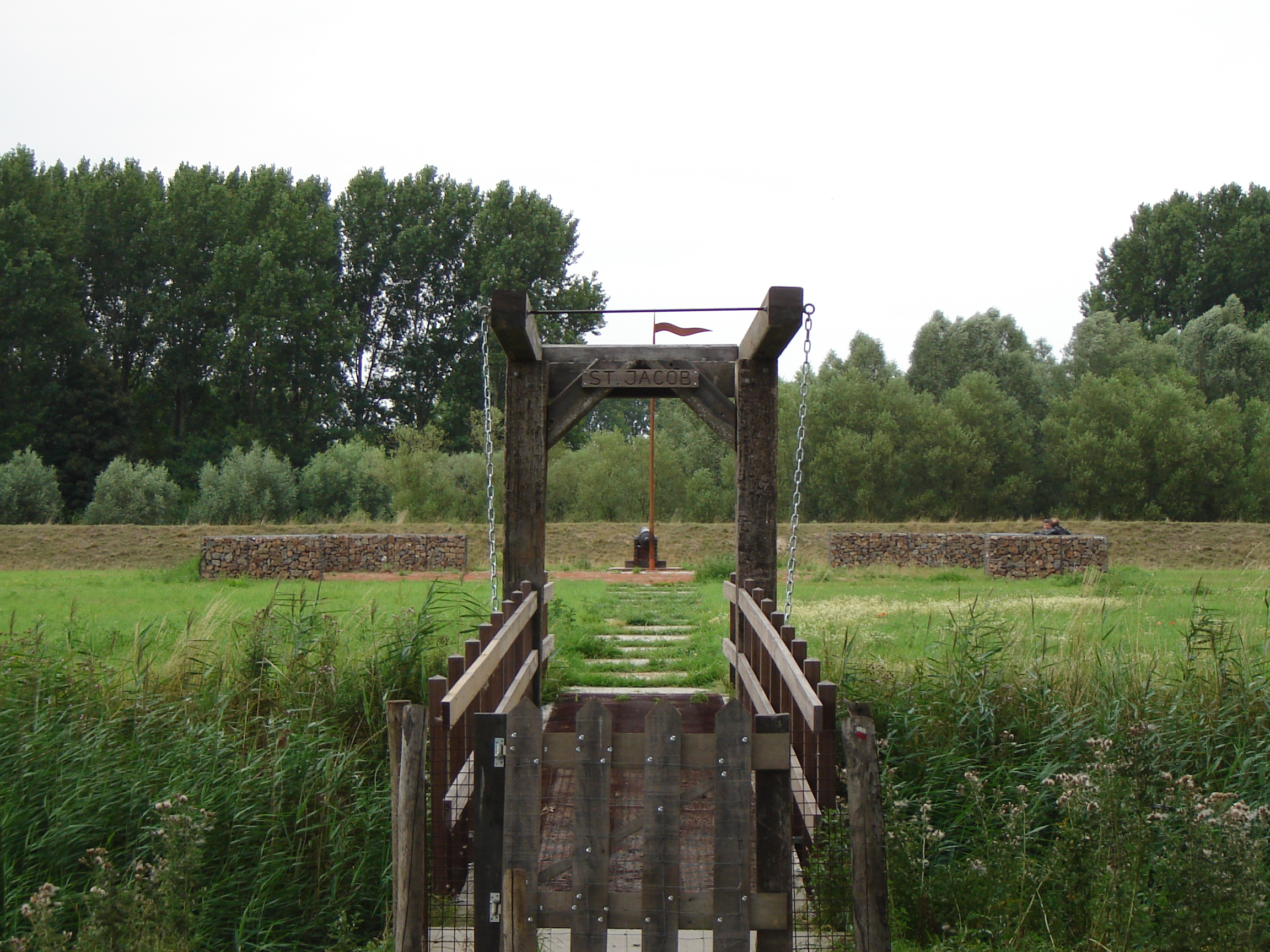
- Fort Sint-Jacob

- Coat of arms

- Location in the province of Zeeland in the Netherlands Koewacht (Netherlands) Koewacht (Belgium)
- Coordinates: 51°13′36″N 3°58′23″E
- Country: Netherlands; Belgium
- Province: Zeeland; East Flanders
- Municipality: Terneuzen; Moerbeke; Stekene

Area
  - Total: 21.80 km^{2} (8.42 sq mi)
- Elevation: 2.5 m (8.2 ft)

Population (2021)
  - Total: 2,938
  - Density: 134.8/km^{2} (349.1/sq mi)
- Time zone: UTC+1 (CET)
  - Summer (DST): UTC+2 (CEST)
- Postal code: 4576
- Dialing code: 0114

Koewacht is a village on the border between the Netherlands and Belgium.

The village consists of two parts; a Dutch and a (smaller) Belgian part.

== Overview ==
The Dutch part is located in Zeelandic Flanders, a part of the province of Zeeland and part of the municipality of Terneuzen. It was a separate municipality until 1970, when it was merged with Axel. In 2003, the Dutch part became part of the municipality of Terneuzen.

Koewacht is a border village. During the Dutch Revolt, it formed the border between the Dutch and Spanish held territories and over twenty forts were built in the area of which seven still have visible remains. Koewacht is a linear settlement on a ridge. In the 18th century, it became a centre for flax production. The church was built between 1713 and 1714, but became located in Belgium in 1839. During World War I, the border was sealed off and the Wire of Death, a lethal electric fence, ran through the village. Between 1921 and 1922, a church was built on the Dutch side.

The Belgian part lies in the province of East Flanders, in the municipalities of Moerbeke and Stekene.

== Gallery ==
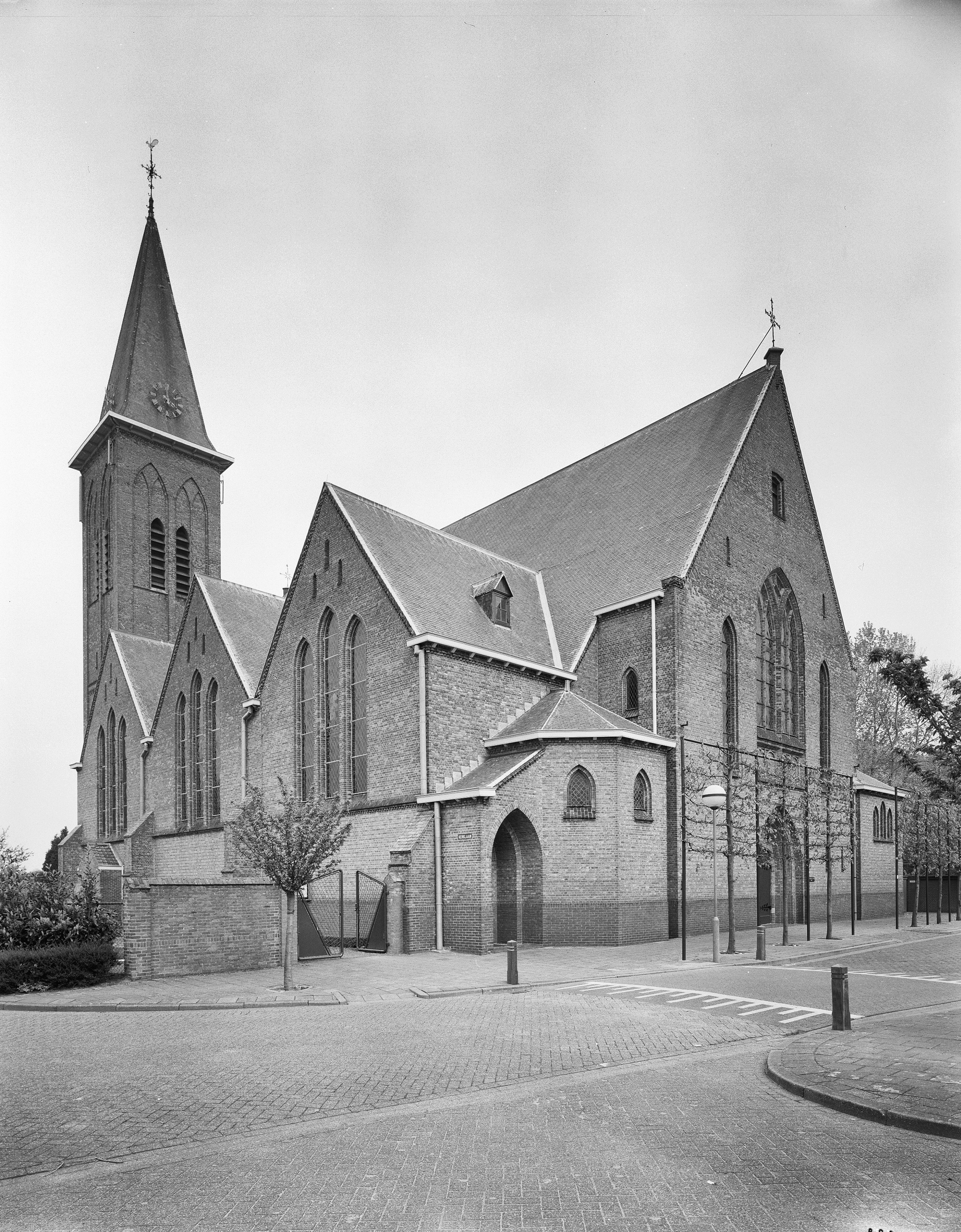
Church in the Netherlands

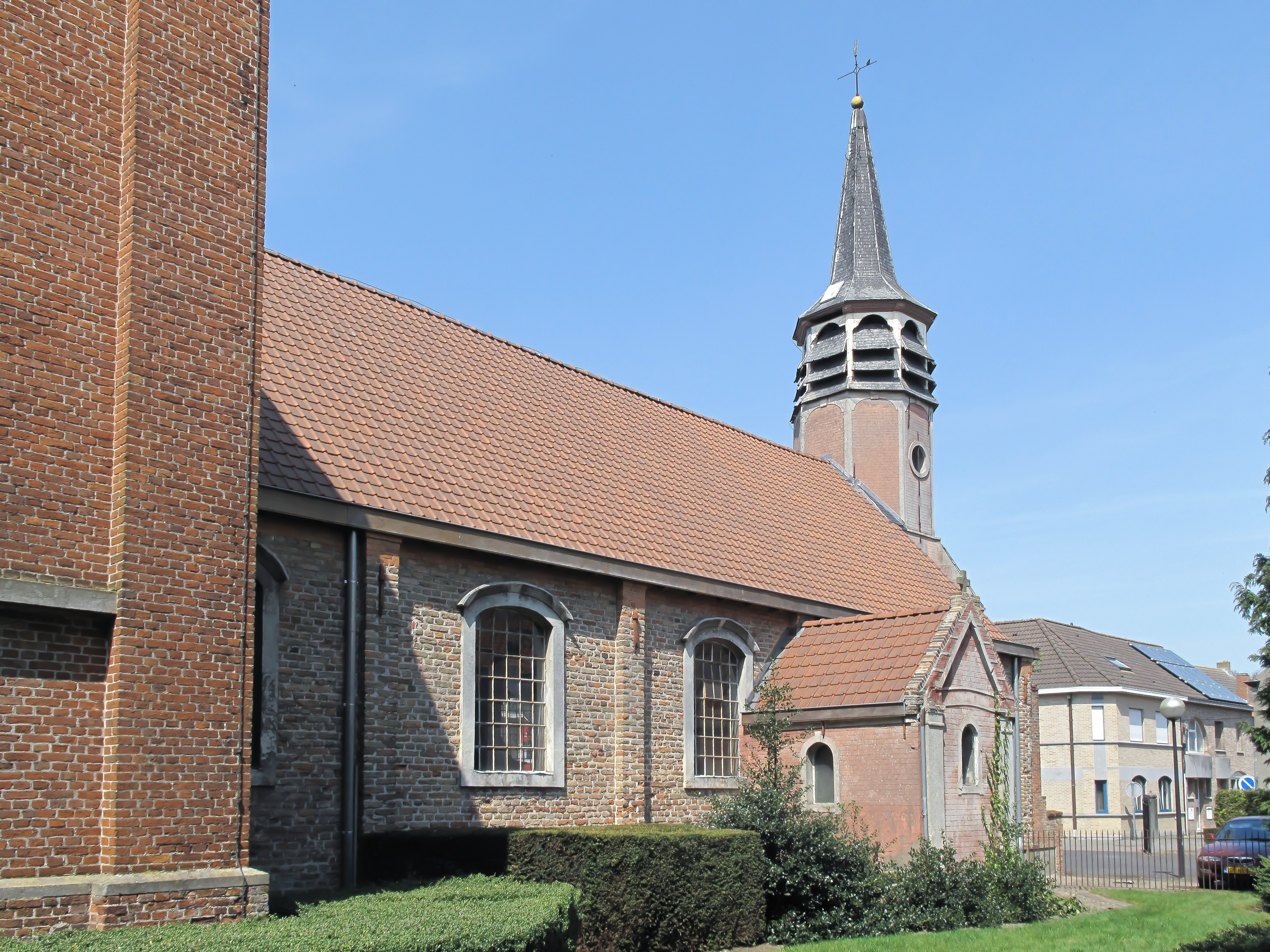
Church in Moerbeke, Belgium
