= Typometry (printing) =

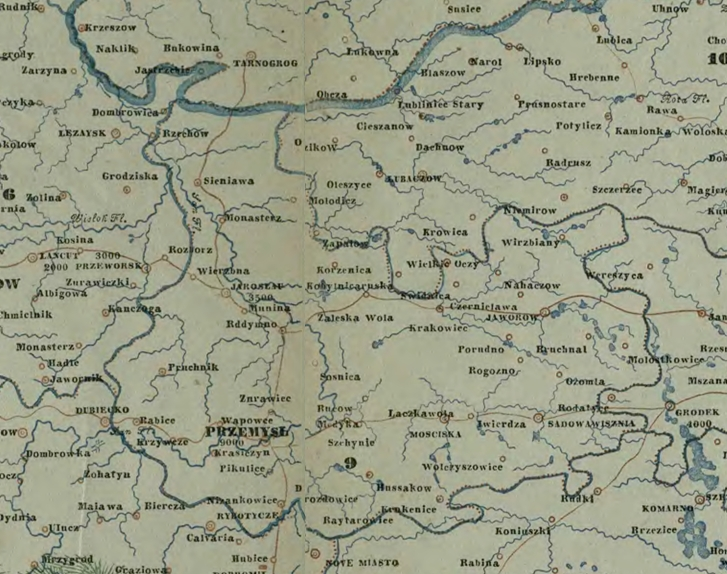
Typometric map of the region of Galicia (Eastern Europe) by Franz Raffelsperger (detail)

Typometry was a short-lived relief printing technique developed during the 18th and 19th centuries to compose maps, drawings and other designs, using moveable type to reproduce words, linework and map symbols.

== History ==
=== Renaissance precursors ===
During the European Renaissance, many engravers and printers resorted to typography to solve the problem of small lettering on maps, which was very difficult to reproduce solely by using custom engraved lettering. One of the techniques they relied on was the setting of metal type, which was fitted inside a special form, surrounded by spacing material. Words set that way could then be overprinted over woodcut-printed maps as a separate plate, either in black or coloured ink. This technique has been considered a precursor of the typometric technique of the 18th century.

=== 18th-century inventors ===
In the 18th century, the German deacon August Gottlieb Preuschen (1734–1803), from Karlsruhe, published two books on the art of printing maps using movable type. The books were printed in Basel, Switzerland, using type from the foundry Haas'sche Schriftgiesserei, by Wilhelm Haas-Münch (1741–1800). Wilhelm Haas-Münch has been quoted as the inventor of typometry in 1776, in competition with Johann Gottlob Breitkopf of Leipzig. The name typometrie was proposed by August Gottlieb Preuschen himself, the former name of the method being ingénieurie d'estampes (sic.) (engraving's engineering, in French in the original).

After some rudimentary tests by Preuschen, the 1776 map of the Canton of Basel (in cuarto format) was the first map created by this technique. Some others would follow, such as the 1777 map of Sicily, which features toponyms printed with moveable type as well as roads, coasts, divisions and rivers printed with folding metal filaments. Special movable topographic symbols mark the mountain ranges of the island, its fortifications, and other landmarks.

The printer Johann Gottlob Immanuel Breitkopf, based in Leipzig (Germany) was at first critical with the invention, claiming that it was impossible to accurately adapt and assemble different shapes of types to create a new form. But, after the typometric prints were proven to be successful, he began experimenting himself with the technique, and he printed a map of the whereabouts of Leipzig by using it.

=== 19th-century researchers ===
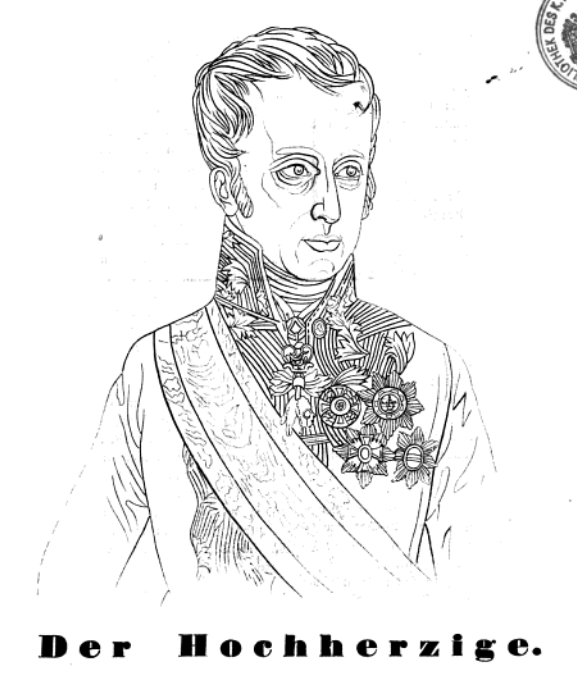
Portrait of Kaiser Ferdinand by Franz Raffelsperger, printed with movable type

In the early 19th century, two different issues of a French review called the Bulletin de la Société d’Encouragement pour l’Industrie Nationale contain articles about typometry. The first one, of 1808, refers to the research work of Mr. Periaux and Mr. Poterat, to produce typometric maps, to generate a viable alternative to engraved maps. The second article, of 1825, introduces the advancements made by Firmin Didot, son, in the technique of printing maps by using typographic means.

The polychrome maps of France made by Didot were sold at the price of 1 franc and 50 cents, which was more affordable than the monochrome engraved maps of the time. Typometric maps, even with their inferior detail quality, were also considerably faster to produce than engraved maps. After Didot, and until 1832, printers Wegener the Young in Berlin and Georg Michael Bauerkeller (1805–1886) in Frankfurt am Main did some essays with the technique for producing maps, but without attaining much success.

It was not until 1839 in Vienna that the Austrian geographer Franz Raffelsperger (1793–1861), having perfected his own printing methods without knowing the work of his predecessors, produced a typometric postal card of the Austrian Empire of unprecedented quality. This postal card was rewarded with the golden medal at the industrial exhibition that took place that year in Vienna, and the next year he opened his own typometric press in that city. Raffelsperger produced moveable type characters that allowed him to print every possible feature in a map, including geographic and topographic features, mathematical and geometric symbols, architectural landmarks and even plants and animals. He also designed custom symbols for cities, forests and other elements, that he printed in five different text sizes and in several languages. He then combined these this typometric technique with polychromy, so he could print moveable type characters for each geographical feature of the map with their very own precise colour hue. The different available sizes of his printing components allowed him to print his maps in several sizes without losing quality, and that at a very reduced cost.

After Raffelsperger, other European printers continued to experiment with typometry, and several examples were presented at the 1855 International Exhibition in Paris. However, with the advent of lithography, invented by Alois Senefelder in 1796, typometry was confronted with another method that was even better at reproducing detail and that allowed to print several solid colours at a low price, so it was progressively abandoned.
