= Moerbeke =

- Municipality
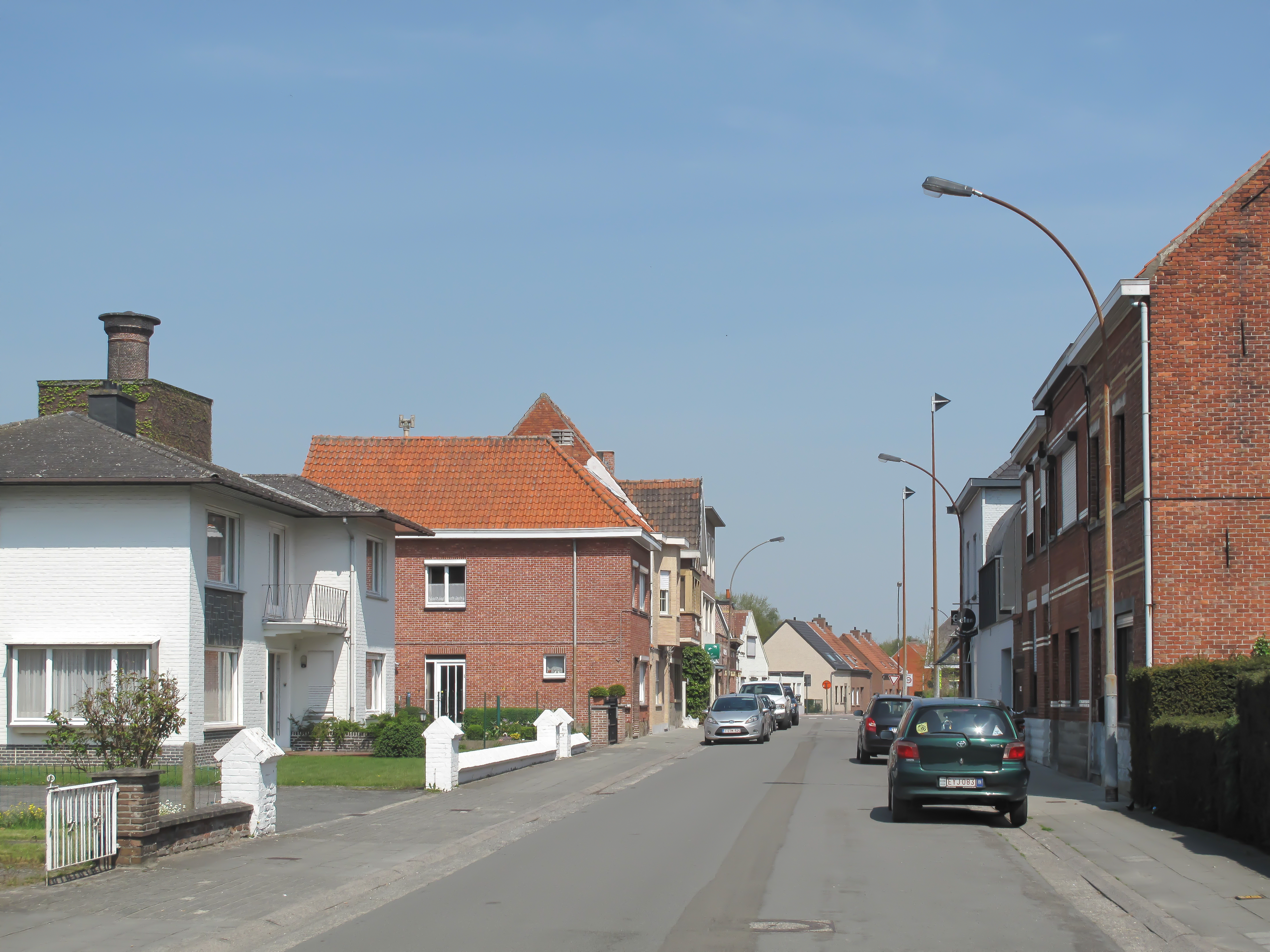

- Flag Coat of arms

- Location of Moerbeke in East Flanders
- Interactive map of Moerbeke
- Location in Belgium
- Coordinates: 51°10′N 03°56′E
- Country: Belgium
- Community: Flemish Community
- Region: Flemish Region
- Province: East Flanders
- Arrondissement: Ghent

Government
  - Mayor: Robby De Caluwé (Open Vld)
  - Governing party: Open Vld

Population (2018-01-01)
  - Total: 6,455
- Postal codes: 9180
- NIS code: 44045
- Area codes: 09, 03
- Website: www.moerbeke.be

Moerbeke (Dutch pronunciation: [ˈmuːrbeːkə]) is a former municipality in the Belgian province of East Flanders. It is sometimes unofficially called Moerbeke-Waas (Dutch pronunciation: [ˌmuːrbeːkə ˈʋaːs]) to distinguish between this place and Moerbeke in Geraardsbergen. The municipality comprises the town of Moerbeke proper, and part of the Dutch-Belgian village Koewacht. In 2021, Moerbeke had a total population of 6,619. The total area is 37.80 km².

Moerbeke was known very well for its sugar refinery.

It is thought to have been the hometown of William of Moerbeke, who as Bishop of Corinth produced a new translation into Latin of the works of Aristotle, including certain which had been rediscovered from Arab sources, in the late 13th century.

Unique is the political situation: since 1847 the liberal party has an absolute majority. The current mayor is Robby De Caluwé. The previous mayor was Filip Marin.

The aldermen are Pierre De Bock, Marc Fruytier, Thierry Walbrecht, Sarah Poppe and Rudy Van Megroot (all Open Vld).

The members of the council are Frederic Dierinck, Inge Mertens, Koen Mertens and Jonas Vandamme for Open Vld, Steven Aper for N-VA, Lut Vandevijver, Marnik Cooreman and Guido Van Hoecke for CD&V and Etienne Coppens and Chantal Francis for SP.a-Groen, Christophe Clerc (formerly N-VA) and Kristof Van Poucke (formerly N-VA) now both independent

== Sports ==
The local sports area is located north of the town center. It includes soccer club KFC Moerbeke, a sports hall, tennis club TC Moerbeke, and a scouting facility.

== Gallery ==
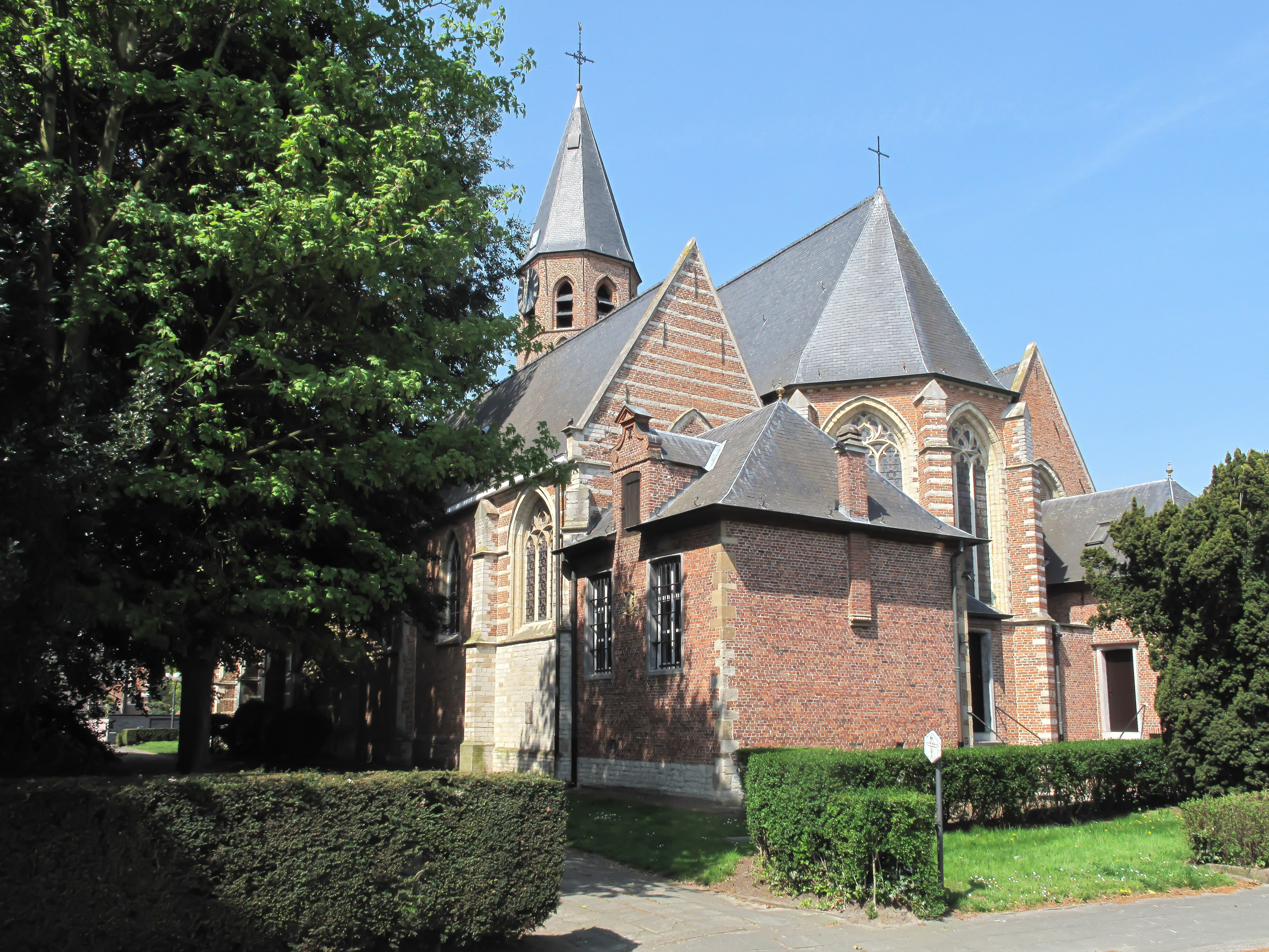
Moerbeke, church: parochiekerk Sint Antonius Abt

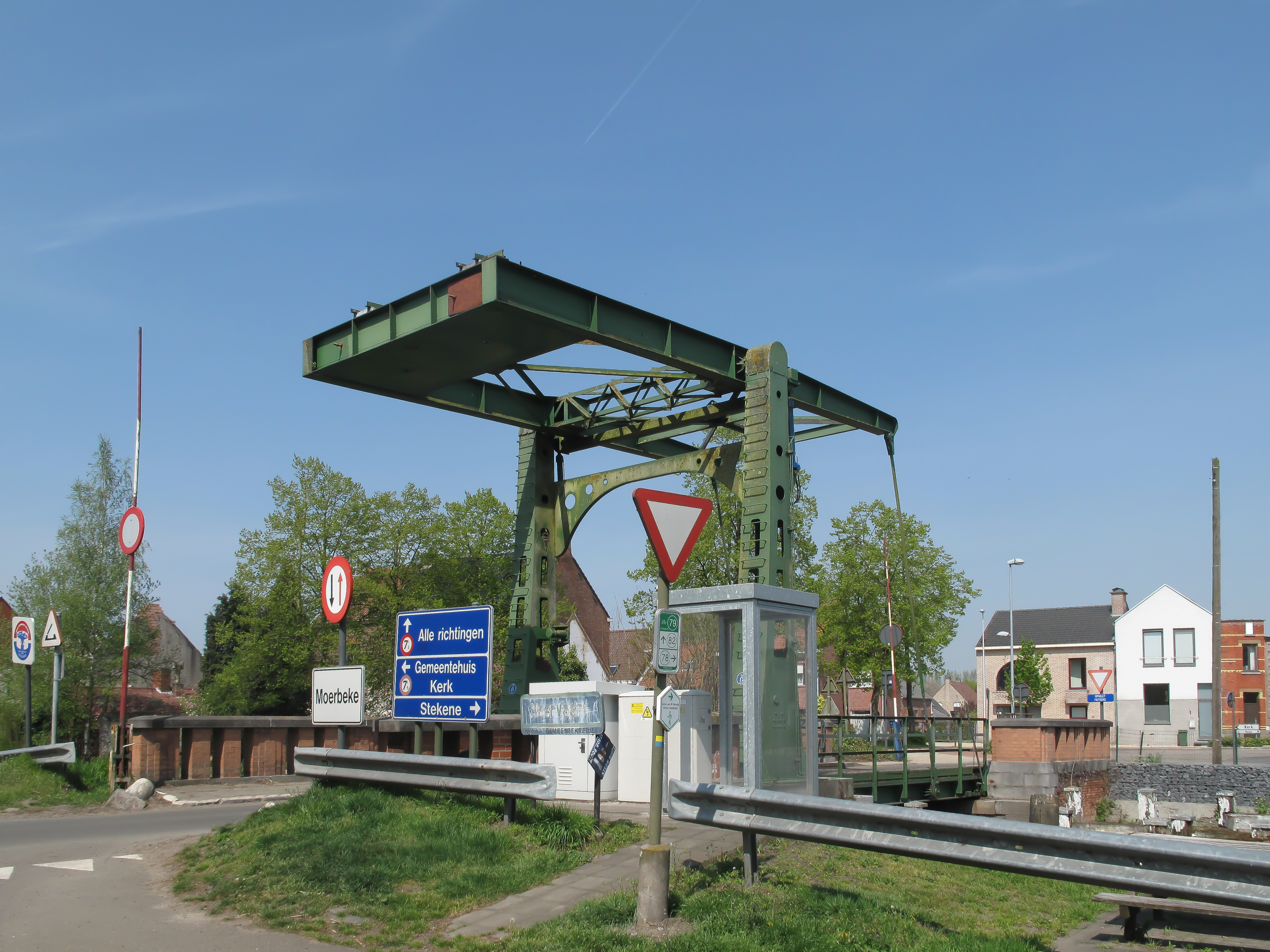
Moerbeke, drawing bridge across de Moervaart

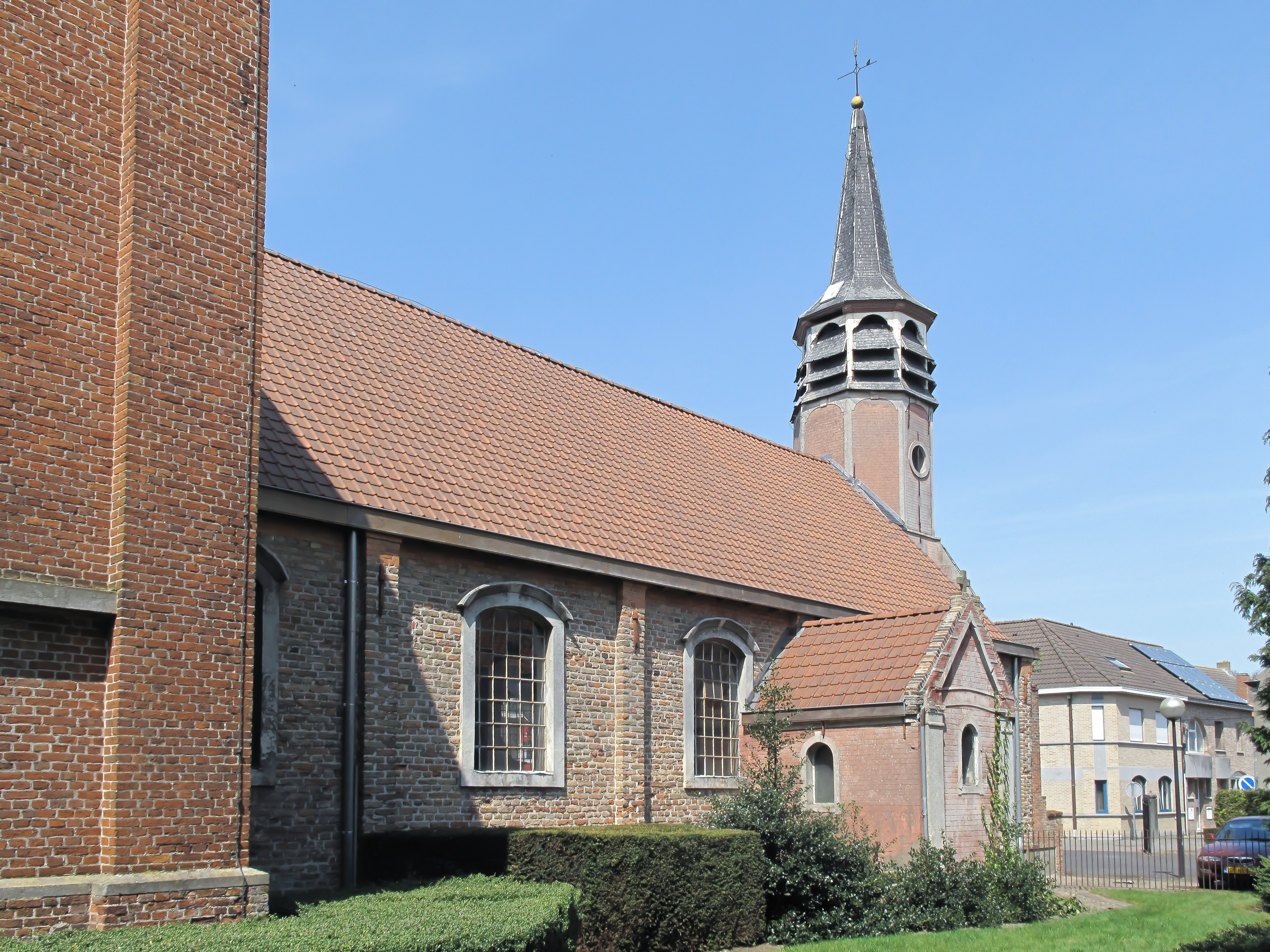
Koewacht-Moerbeke, church: de Sint Filippus en Sint Jacobuskerk
