= Saint-Géry Island =

Former island in Brussels, Belgium

Coordinates: 50.8481°N 4.3476°E

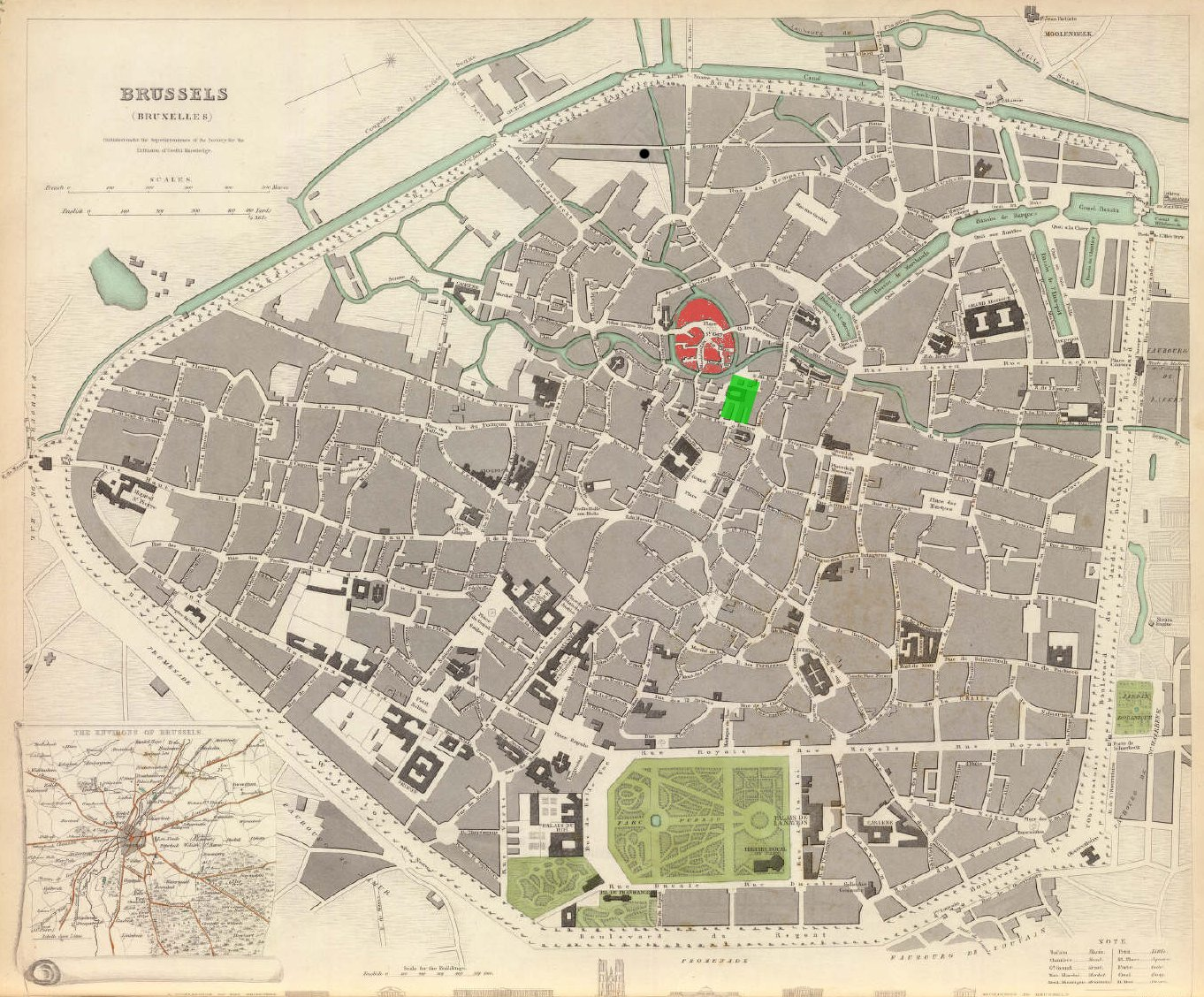
Map of Brussels in 1837. Saint-Géry Island is highlighted in red, the Bourse Palace is superimposed in green. North is roughly to the right.

Saint-Géry Island (French: île Saint-Géry) or Sint-Goriks Island (Dutch: Sint-Gorikseiland) was the largest island in the river Senne in Brussels, Belgium. It was named after Saint Gaugericus (Note: French: Saint Géry, Dutch: Sint-Goriks) of Cambrai, who according to legend, built a chapel there around 580. It ceased to exist as an island when the Senne was covered over in the late 19th century, and a market hall, the Halles Saint-Géry/Sint-Gorikshallen, was built in its centre. Since the late 20th century, this building has been rehabilitated as a cultural centre and exhibition space.

== Location and accessibility ==
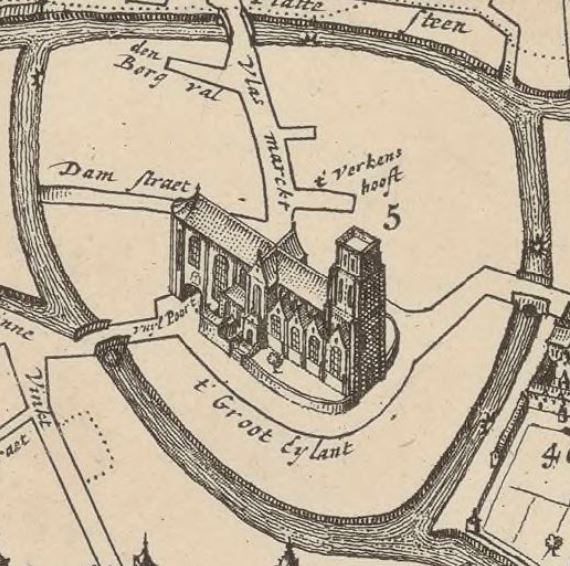
Saint-Géry Island with the Church of St. Gaugericus, depicted in Bruxella, nobilissima Brabantiæ civitas (1695)

Saint-Géry Island's easternmost edge was located roughly due west across today's Boulevard Anspach/Anspachlaan from the Place de la Bourse/Beursplein and the Bourse Palace. The island, formed by the river Senne, was roughly round, and was originally centred on the Church of St. Gaugericus. Following the church's demolition in 1798–1802, the site is now home to the Halles Saint-Géry/Sint-Gorikshallen, a market hall and cultural centre, which has since become one of Brussels' trendiest districts.

Many streets and buildings in the area still bear the name Saint-Géry/Sint-Goriks. On a small square between the Place Saint-Géry/Sint-Goriksplein and the Rue Saint-Christophe/Sint-Kristoffelsstraat, there is also still a dead arm of the Senne, the only part of the river in the city centre that is not vaulted. This neighbourhood is served by the premetro (underground tram) station Bourse - Grand-Place/Beurs - Grote Markt on lines 4 and 10.

== History ==
=== Early history ===
According to local legend, Saint Gaugericus of Cambrai built a chapel on the island around the year 580; hence the name Brussels, which derives from the Old Dutch Bruocsella, Broekzele or Broeksel, meaning "marsh" (bruoc / broek) and "home" or "settlement" (sella / zele / sel) or "settlement in the marsh". Starting in the 10th century, the church began to house the relics of the martyr Saint Gudula, who had died two centuries earlier, transferred there from Moorsel (located in today's province of East Flanders) by Duke Charles of Lower Lorraine. In 1047, these relics were transferred again by Count Lambert II of Leuven to the church that would later become the Cathedral of St. Michael and St. Gudula.

When Holy Roman Emperor Otto II appointed the same Charles to become Duke of Lower Lotharingia in 977, Charles constructed a fort on the island. Past the island, navigation on the Senne was much more difficult, so it was a good strategic position. It had to defend not only the area, but also the western frontier of the Holy Roman Empire (to which the Duchy of Brabant, and thus also Brussels, belonged) against attacks by the French kings and their powerful vassals, the Counts of Flanders. This fort marked the birth of the City of Brussels, though the ruins have not been found. The island was also said to be once completely carpeted in yellow irises. Due to the island's importance, the iris has been a symbol of Brussels since the 19th century, and a stylised version is featured on the flag of the Brussels-Capital Region.

By the 12th century, the island was home to a high density of watermills, playing an important role in Brussels' growth as a commercial centre. During the Middle Ages, the island also housed a large number of fishmongers, who would use the surrounding river to exchange the water in their fish reservoirs. Fish were extremely important in the Roman Catholic city, as fasts prescribed by the church were rigorously obeyed. This ceased to be common practice even before the Industrial Revolution, as a growing number of tanners, dyers and other trades dumped their waste into the river, causing it to be unsuitable for storing fish.

Between 1798 and 1801, under the French regime, the Gothic Church of St. Gaugericus (which had replaced the chapel) was razed, and in 1802, an obelisk-shaped blue stone fountain from Grimbergen Abbey, dating from 1767, was placed on the new public square that replaced it. The square was an open-air market for the following century.

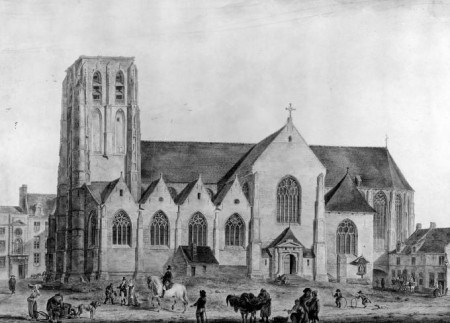
The Church of St. Gaugericus in the 18th century (demolished 1798–1802)

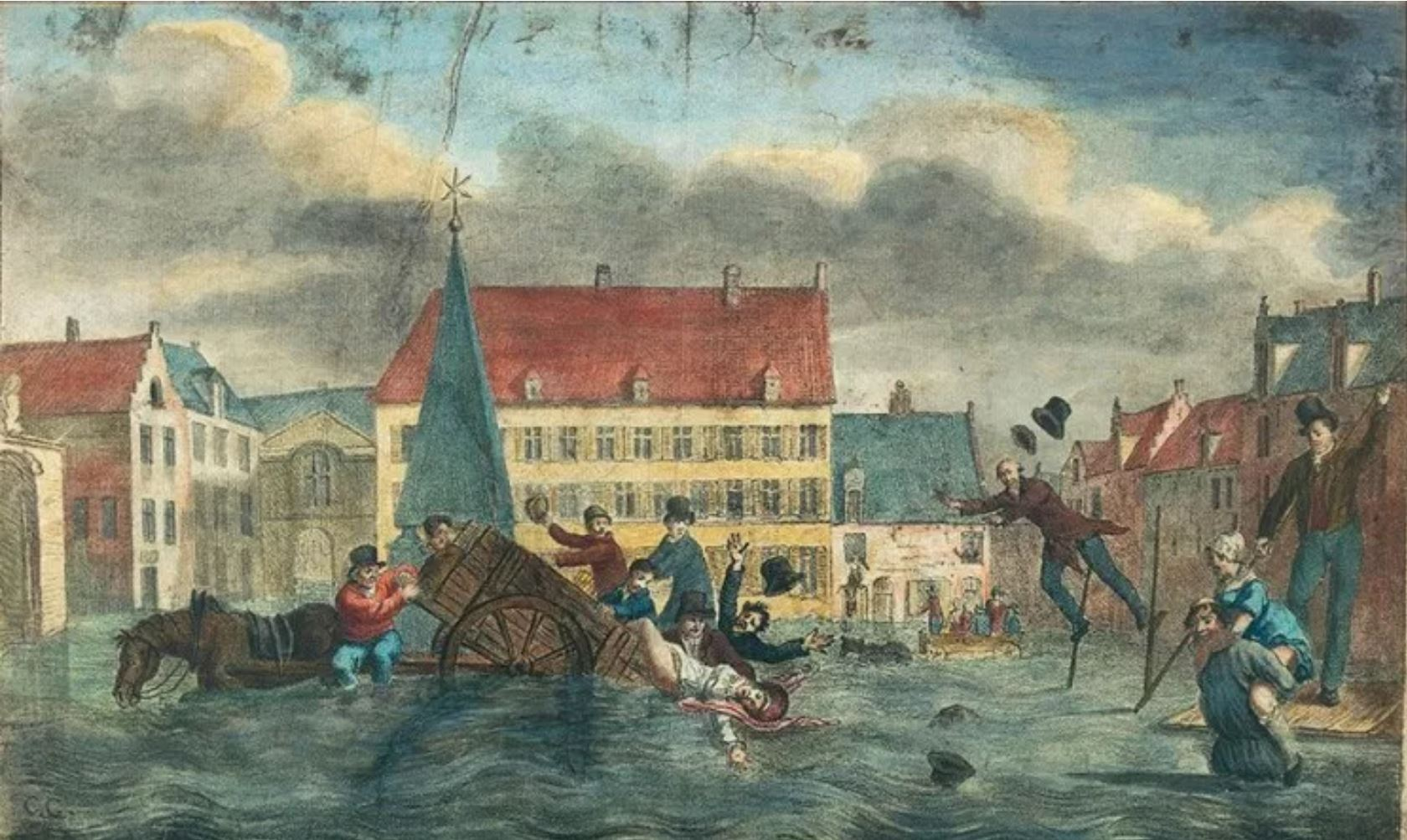
Cartoon showing the Place Saint-Géry/Sint-Goriksplein during the flood of January 1820

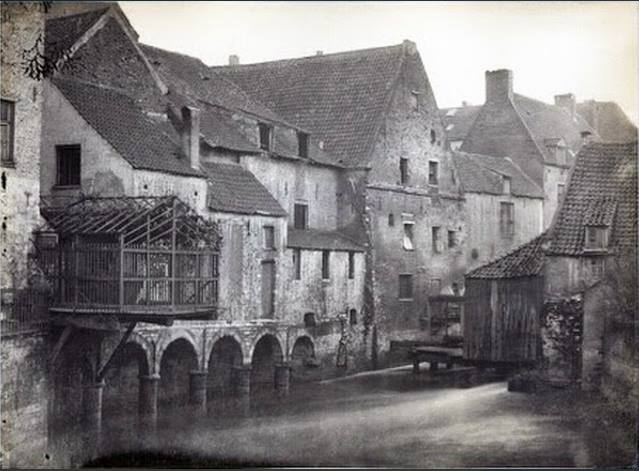
Saint-Géry Island in 1867, before the covering of the Senne

=== 19th century–present ===
Around 1870, when the Senne was covered over, the island ceased to exist as an island and some of its eastern sections were demolished to make way for the modern bourgeois housing on the newly constructed Boulevard Anspach/Anspachlaan (then called the Boulevard Central/Centraallaan). Plans were made to create a covered market to replace the open-air one. The building, known as the Halles Saint-Géry (Dutch: Sint-Gorikshallen), was commissioned in 1880 and construction began in 1881. Designed by the architect Adolphe Vanderheggen in neo-Flemish Renaissance style, it was completed in 1882. The building's metallic structure is an outstanding example of hall design, combining historicist elements with iron and glass construction. The interior, which still includes the old fountain-obelisk, has four rows of double blue stone stalls and counters.

The Halles Saint-Géry prospered until after the Second World War, then, abandoned by traders, it was finally closed in 1977. Despite the building's designation in 1987 and several attempts at commercial or cultural reassignment, it took more than twenty years for the halls to benefit from a definitive rehabilitation as an exhibition space. Nowadays, the Saint-Géry area is well known for the many bars, cafés and restaurants in the vicinity, making it a popular nightspot in the capital.

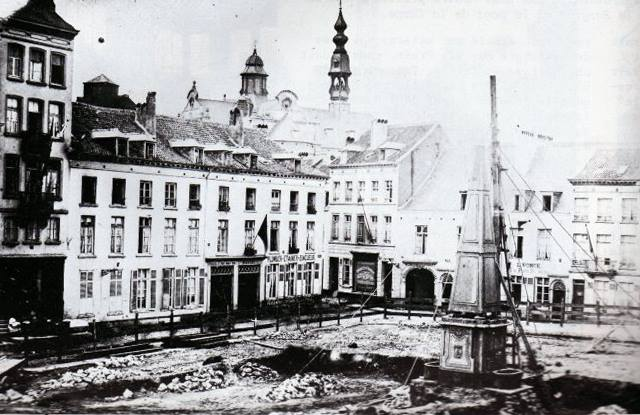
Construction of the Halles Saint-Géry/Sint-Gorikshallen, c. 1881

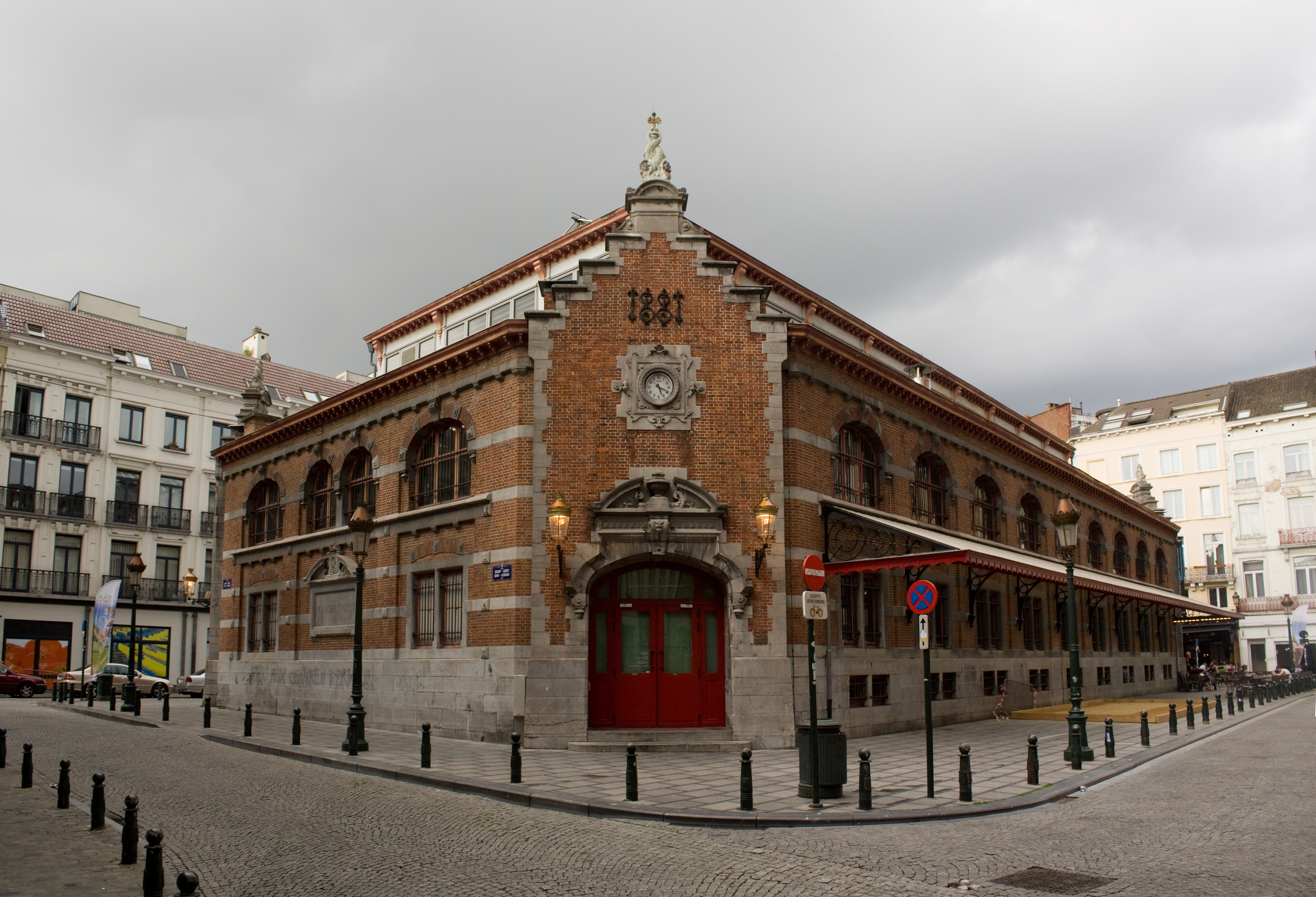
The Halles Saint-Géry as it appears today

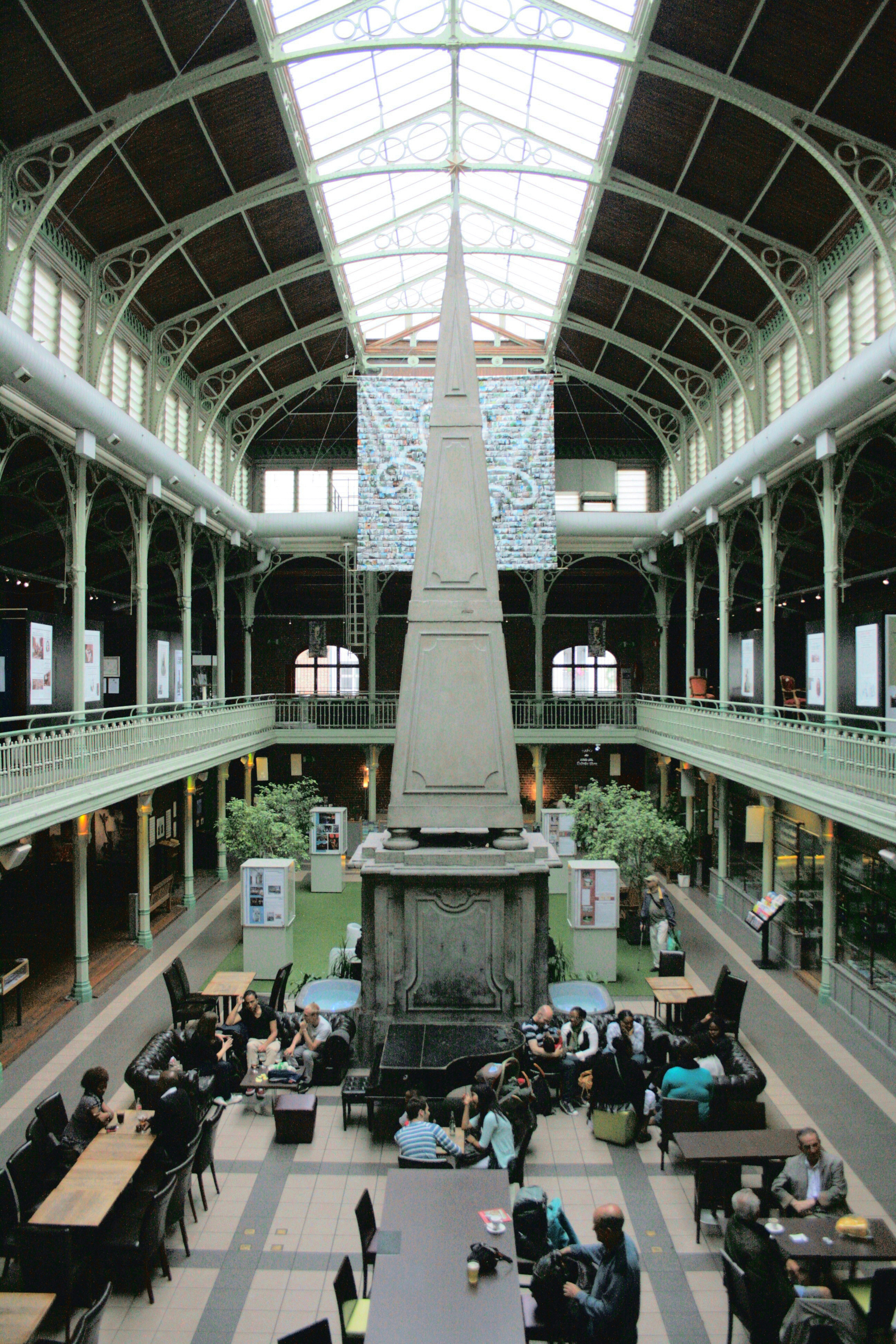
Interior of the Halles Saint-Géry

== See also ==
- History of Brussels
- Belgium in the long nineteenth century
