= Detective Van Zwam =

Publication information
- Publisher: Standaard Uitgeverij (Belgium)
- First appearance: The Adventures of Nero: Het Geheim van Matsuoka (1947).
- Created by: Marc Sleen

Detective Van Zwam is a Flemish comics character in the Belgian comics series The Adventures of Nero by Marc Sleen. He is a brilliant detective and able to find clues from even the tiniest of evidence.

Van Zwam was originally the main protagonist and the series was named after him, but after ten stories his more popular sidekick, Nero, became the main protagonist instead. Since then Van Zwam was recast as a side character.

== History ==
In 1945 Willy Vandersteen's comics series Suske en Wiske was a major success in Flanders. The newspaper De Nieuwe Gids asked their political cartoonist Marc Sleen to create a comics series of their own to compete with Suske en Wiske 's popularity. Thus Sleen thought up a series centering around a smart detective, Van Zwam. The name was an idea of journalist Gaston Durnez, who based it on the Flemish dialect verb "zwammen" ("to talk bollocks").

Van Zwam made his first appearance in the very first The Adventures of Nero story "Het Geheim van Matsuoka" ("Matsuoka's Secret") (1947), making him the oldest character in the franchise. Nine albums long the series was named after Van Zwam, but he was eventually pushed aside by the popularity of his sidekick Nero, who also made his debut in "Het Geheim van Matsuoka". Readers responded more enthusiastically to Nero than Van Zwam, thus making him the series' hero from "De Hoed van Geeraard de Duivel" ("Geeraard the Devil's Hat") (1950) on. Van Zwam's appearances became less frequent from that moment on, though he still remained a good friend of Nero and a major protagonist within the cast. In some stories, such as "De Verdwenen Nero" ("The Disappeared Nero") (1979), "De Terugkeer van Geeraard de Duivel" ("The Return of Geeraard the Devil") (1983) en "De Gelukbrenger" ("The Luck Bringer") (1988), Van Zwam complains about no longer being the series' hero.

== Character ==
Van Zwam is a genius detective who always carries his magnifying glass around. He is able to detect significant details about people just by inspecting a cigarette butt that fell on the ground. In "De Zwarte Toren" ("The Black Tower") (1983) he is even able to use his magnifying glass as a rear-view mirror. In early stories Van Zwam wore a trilby, but from "De Groene Gravin" ("The Green Duchess") (1975) on he wears a Sherlock Holmes-type hat.

Van Zwam briefly becomes a dealer in champagne in "De Bende van de Zwarte Kous" ("The Black Sock Gang") (1952). In the same story he reveals he was once a personal body guard for the mayor of Brussels. Van Zwam was also honorary detective of Ghent and honorary citizen of Ostend once. In "Het B-Gevaar" ("The B-Danger") (1948) he is rich enough to afford himself a maid and butler and in "Het Zeespook" ("The Sea Ghost") (1948) he accepts the service of former crook Willie as his personal servant.

Van Zwam is fond of fast cars, usually Porsche. In "Het Zeespook" he also drives a Ford and in "De Man Met Het Gouden Hoofd" ("The Man With The Golden Head") (1950) he owns a private plane. In "Het Theepotje des Konings" ("The King's Tea pot") (1978) economic crisis has forced him to travel by kick scooter, bike or by foot.

Van Zwam is often victim of assassination attempts. In "De Juwelen van Gaga-Pan" ("The Jewels of Gaga-Pan") (1949) and "Het Bobobeeldje" ("The Bobo Statue") (1965) he is wounded in a car accident. In "Het Geheim van Bakkendoen" ("The Secret of Bakkendoen") (1957-1958), "Toffe Theo" ("Nice Theo") (1969), "Het Geheim van Jan Spier" ("The Secret of Jan Spier") (1977) he is shot down. In "De Paarse Futen" ("The Purple Great crested grebes") (1966-1967) his legs are tied into a knot. In "De Groene Chinees" ("The Green Chinese") (1954), "De Zwarte Toren" ("The Black Tower") (1983), "Baraka" (1986) and "De Drie Wrekers" ("The Three Avengers") (1992) villains put a bar of soap on the stairs, causing Van Zwam to trip and break his leg. In "De Gouden Patatten" ("The Golden Potatoes") (1984) Van Zwam is shot by the Brabant killers and near death. As a matter of protest all the main protagonists of The Adventures of Nero decide to go on strike to force Marc Sleen into bring him back to life, which he eventually does.

In "Het Zeespook" ("The Sea Ghost") (1948) and "Het Rattenkasteel" ("The Rat's Castle" (1948) Van Zwam has a little dog named Tito, after the Yugoslavian president Josip Broz Tito. In "Operatie Koekoek" ("Operation Cuckoo") (1958) Van Zwam is transformed into a cuckoo and in "Allemaal Beestjes" ("All Animals") (1981) into a marabou stork.

== Family ==
Van Zwam has an uncle, Isidoor, who passes away at the start of the story "Het B-Gevaar" ("The B-Danger") (1948) and leaves him his will. In the same story Van Zwam discovers his uncle is still alive thanks to a machine that has the ability to make people younger again. He even gains a twin clone. Near the end of the story both Isidoors are changed into young men. "Het B-Gevaar" also gives the reader a glimpse what Van Zwam may have looked like as a child when the machine transforms him into a baby.

Van Zwam is always referred to by his last name. In the album "De Erfenis van Millaflotta" ("The Heritage of Millaflotta") (2000) the reader learns that his first name is "Theodoor".

== In popular culture ==
Van Zwam had a cameo appearance in the Agent 327 album De Golem van Antwerpen (2001-2002), alongside agent Gaston, another character from The Adventures of Nero.

He is one of the characters sculpted on a bas-relief in Sint-Niklaas, made by sculptor Paul Dekker in 1988 to commemorate Marc Sleen's induction as an honor citizen of the city. Van Zwam can also be seen on a wall dedicated to "Nero" at the Sint-Goriksplein/Place Saint-Géry in Brussels, in 1995, where it is part of the Brussels' Comic Book Route.

In the 1984 opera Het Rattenkasteel Van Zwam was played by Lieven De Roo.
