= Abraham Tuizentfloot =

Publication information
- Publisher: Standaard Uitgeverij (Belgium)
- First appearance: The Adventures of Nero: De Granaatslikker (1957).
- Created by: Marc Sleen

Abraham Tuizentfloot, in full Oscar Abraham Tuizentfloot, is a Flemish comic book character from the Belgian comic book series The Adventures of Nero by Marc Sleen. He is a crazy little man who dresses up as a pirate and has a tendency to attack people. In the series he is one of Nero's personal friends.

Tuizentfloot is one of the most popular and recognizable Flemish comic book characters. He has his own statue in Wuustwezel. The character is also very popular in the Netherlands, according to creator Marc Sleen.

== Origins ==
Tuizentfloot made his debut in the 28th Nero story De Granaatslikker ("The Grenade Swallower") (1957) when he rings at Nero's door and invites him to go on adventure together. Nero, however, is tired and tells Tuizentfloot "to go to Geel" In the course of the story Nero desperately tries to get rid of this crazy man, but he travels along as a stowaway to Antarctica. From that moment on he is part of Nero's circle of friends.

== Character ==
Tuizentfloot is an insane little man who thinks he is a pirate and an admiral. He uses naval expressions, especially when insulting and berating others. Tuizentfloot often brags about all the battles he supposedly won, including the Battle of Trafalgar, the Battle of Abukir and those of Zwijnaarde, Santa Cruz and Wuustwezel. He also claims to have discovered Trinidad, Port Salut and "Port Dada" and considers himself to be the "biggest pirate of all time!" Tuizentfloot acts the part too. He is always dressed like an 18th-century buccaneer, complete with black Jolly Roger bicorne and a sabre. In some stories we see him pulling a miniature cannon behind him and in one story, "De Dolle Vloot" ("The Crazy Fleet") (1976) he owns a 16th-century caravel. Only in a few albums he wears different outfits, namely "De Driedubbelgestreepte" ("The Three Double Striped One") (1963), in which he calls himself "Otto... aha... Mobil" and walks around with a piece of carrossery around his body. In "De Neroberg" ("The Nero Mountain") (1986) he wears a traditional Indian outfit and calls himself "Kalimpong Singh".

Despite all this there is never any real evidence that Tuizentfloot is an actual pirate? He is hardly ever seen at sea and only in "De Dolle Vloot" do we see his own ship. Tuizentfloot can't even swim. Seeing that he is certified insane and spent a lot of time in mental institutions it can be assumed that it's part of his personal illusions. In "De Zwarte Piraat" ("The Black Pirate") (1990–1991) he meets another eccentric man, Pol van den Hoven tot Pee (aka "Pottepee"), who also dresses up like a pirate and makes many of the same ludicrous claims Tuizentloot does.

Tuizentfloot has a verbal tic that makes him use the word "aha" in almost every sentence he says or shouts. He is also paranoid and frequently attacks people whom he considers to be "the enemy". Usually he swings at them with his sabre, stinging and cutting them in the process while he yells his catchphrase: "Ten... aha... aanval!" ("Let's... aha... attack!"). Much like Captain Haddock Tuizentfloot doesn't shy away from using inspired vulgarities to insult his opponents, many inspired by naval terms. Even Nero and his friends aren't safe from Tuizentfloot's aggression and anger. He frequently fights Meneer Pheip and his son Clo-Clo and destroys their clothing and homes. In some stories Tuizentfloot even sides with Villains. From his first appearance on, in "De Granaatslikker" ("The Grenade Swallower") (1957), Tuizentfloot starts a mutiny against Captain Oliepul on Nero's ship and does this again in "De Nerovingers" ("The Nerovingers") (1960). In "Het Knalgele Koffertje" ("The Little Bright Yellow Trunk") (1958–1959) Tuizentfloot helps a group of thieves to steal a precious trunk from Nero's uncle and bring it to Adolf Hitler. In "De Nerovingers" (1960) Tuizentfloot helps the mad scientist Marcus Liberius in his crazy plan to split the Earth in two. In "De Bibberballon" (1990) ("The Shiver Balloon") and "De Zwarte Piraat" ("The Black Pirate") (1990) Tuizentfloot wants to join the First Gulf War to fight Saddam Hussein. Several of his insane friends are either a nuisance to Nero and co, or even a dangerous threat.

All in all Nero and his friends do consider Tuizentfloot to be one of their closest relatives. In "Nerorock" (1990) Nero starts a rock band and Tuizentfloot is hired as their drummer, seeing that he is "crazier than Animal". When Tuizentfloot is shot by Ricardo in "Het Spook van Zoetendaal" ("The Ghost of Zoetendaal") (1979) Nero is even honestly angry and upset. He tells his wounded friend that without him the Nero stories are like "beer without foam". Tuizentfloot has also saved Nero many times against criminals who dared to attack him.

== Family ==
In "De Adhemar Bonbons" ("The Adhemar Pralines") (1989) Tuizentfloot is transformed into a baby, so we get an idea what he looked like at that age. In "Daris Doet Het" ("Daris Does It") (1978) it is revealed that his mother hailed from IJmuiden and his father from Springintveld (a non-existing place which is a pun on the Dutch term "spring-in-'t-veld", used for enthusiastic people.) This would make Tuizentfloot partially of Dutch descent. He also has a sister, Dina, who is a radical feminist and also wears a pirate hat on her head. Two of his uncles were apparently rich and left him their fortune twice

Tuizentfloot fell in love with Prinses Lovely in "De Mosterd van Abraham" ("The Mustard of Abraham") (1973), but, despite wanting to marry him at first, she eventually rejects him "because his moustache is too long and his socks too short." In "De Gladde Figaro" ("The Slippery Figaro") (1991–1992) he wants to marry Madam Pheip, but she too rejects him.

== Friendships with animals ==
Tuizentfloot usually gets on well with animals. In "De Granaatslikker" ("The Grenade Swallower") (1957), "Het Wonderwolkje" ("The Magic Cloud") (1960) and "Kouwe Kwibus" (1967) ("Cold Weirdo") he respectively uses a pig, a pelican and a giant mosquito as his personal mount. Still he can attack and kill them too, like the snake and tiger in "De Kat van Katmandu" ("The Cat of Catmandu") (1978). In "De Hond van Pavlov" ("Pavlov's dog") (1994) Tuizentfloot's nose is bit off by a small dog.

Tuizentfloot is changed into an animal himself twice. In "De Kat van Katmandu" ("The Cat of Catmandu" (1978)) he is changed into a cockatoo and in "Allemaal Beestjes" ("All Animals") (1981) in a wasp.

== In popular culture ==
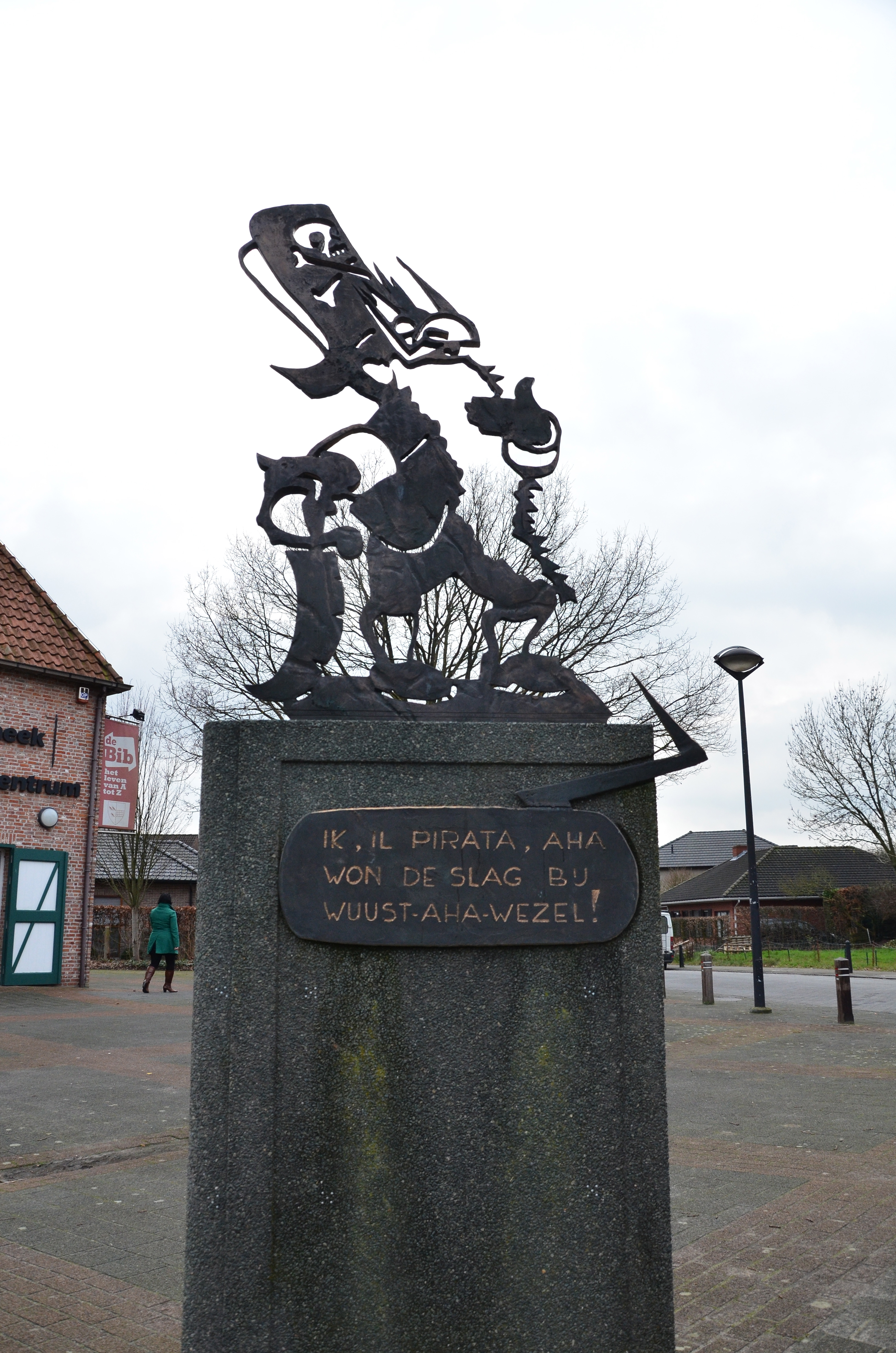
Statue of Abraham Tuizentfloot in Wuustwezel

Over the decades Abraham Tuizentfloot has enjoyed immense popularity with "Nero"'s readers. Marc Sleen claimed he was his most popular character in the Netherlands and in 1973 Tuizentfloot was elected as "Comic Book Character of the Year" by the magazine Stripschrift. In Damme, West-Flanders, a comic book store was named AHA! Tussen boek en strip ("AHA! Between book and comic"), after Tuizentfloot's catch phrase.

Tuizentfloot is included along with other Nero characters on a bas-relief in Sint-Niklaas, made by sculptor Paul Dekker in 1988 to commemorate Marc Sleen's induction as an honor citizen of the city. In 1995 a special wall near the Saint-Géry Island in Brussels celebrating Nero characters, also included him.

In 2000 Tuizentfloot also received his own statue in Wuustwezel in front of the local library in de Dorpsstraat. The location was chosen because Tuizentfloot frequently refers to the town in the Nero albums, claiming to have won the (non-existent) "Battle of Wuustwezel". It was designed in bronze by artist Gilbert Uitdenhouwen. In 2009 the statue was subject of vandalism and had to be repaired.

Despite Tuizentfloot's popularity with readers Sleen was often asked by other readers to remove the character from the series. Especially his bosses from his newspaper De Standaard didn't like Tuizentfloot's aggressiveness and constant swearing. Sleen responded to this by having the character not appear in some stories, but by popular demand he was always forced to bring him back again. In "De Mosterd van Abraham" (1973) Tuizentfloot visits Marc Sleen at the start of the story to complain about his small roles in his latest albums.
