= Oktaaf Keunink =

Belgian comic series

- Oktaaf painting the floor, while Beva reads the newspaper.
- Author: Marc Sleen
- Current status/schedule: Terminated.
- Launch date: 16 November 1952
- End date: 4 April 1965
- Genre(s): Humor comics, Gag-a-day comics

Oktaaf Keunink (sometimes written as Octaaf, even though most album titles refer to the series as "Oktaaf") was a Belgian comics series, written and drawn by Marc Sleen. It was published between 16 November 1952 and 4 April 1965 in the magazine Ons Zondagsblad.

On 1 January 2030, all comics series by Marc Sleen, including Oktaaf Keunink, will enter public domain, in accordance with the Marc Sleen Foundation.

== Concept ==
Oktaaf Keunink centers around an old pipe smoking office clerk who is dominated by his bossy wife Beva. In some gags he has a temporary different job, but most of the time he works at his office. His home address was also specified in the series, namely Kladderpoelstraat 9 in the fictitious village Zwaaigem (a pun on Aaigem or Baaigem). A running gag is Oktaaf's desperate attempt to play cards with his friends in his local bar, even though his wife repeatedly tries to keep him home. He also has a rivalry with his neighbour, Balk, who looks a lot like Slager Janssenss from Sleen's other series Doris Dobbel (both characters were caricatures of Jan De Spot, a journalist who was one of Sleen's personal friends). Balk's wife also resembled another character by Sleen, namely Madam Nero, wife of Nero in The Adventures of Nero.

The comics series was published in Wallonia too as Octave Blaireau. Like most of Sleen's other gag series Oktaaf Keunink came to an end when he dropped all his series in 1965 in favor of The Adventures of Nero.

== In popular culture ==
In 1971 Herman De Coninck and Piet Piryns interviewed Marc Sleen for the magazine Humo. As a tribute they signed their article with the pseudonyms "Herman de Keunink" and Piet Fluwijns (a nod to Sleen's series Piet Fluwijn en Bolleke).
