= Het Rattenkasteel (opera) =

- Comic opera, Avant-garde by Johan De Smet
- Librettist: Arne Sierens
- Language: Dutch
- Based on: Het Rattenkasteel, an album from the Belgian comic book series The Adventures of Nero by Marc Sleen
- Premiere: 14 July 1984; Nieuwpoorttheater in Ghent, Belgium.

Het Rattenkasteel ("The Rat's Castle") was a 1984 opera adaptation of the comic book album Het Rattenkasteel from The Adventures of Nero series by Marc Sleen. It was directed by Arne Sierens, composed by Johan De Smet and under musical direction of Vincent D'Hondt.

The work was performed by the theatre group "De Sluipende Armoede" and actors such as Marc van Malderen, Guido Naessens, Lieven Deroo, Martien De Craene, and others. The masks and costumes were provided by Erik De Volder. The stage was designed by Bert Vervaet.

== History ==
The idea to adapt an album of The Adventures of Nero for opera came about when Sierens and De Smet were having a drink. They decide to create it in four months time, much like Wolfgang Amadeus Mozart used to do, and, inspired by a manifest by George Antheil, decided to keep it short and simple. Sierens wrote the libretto in four weeks time. The rehearsals started while De Smet was still composing the score. The entire ouverture was completed at the night of the final rehearsal. Marc Sleen created the poster.

The work was performed in an avant-garde style, complete with percussion and diamond blades as musical accompaniment. The arias were pastiches of various musical styles, including film music, schlager, rock music and traditional African music. It opened on 14 July 1984 and had two extra performances on 20 and 21 July that year. The general public enjoyed it, but professional critics disliked it and compared it to a school play.

== Cast ==
- Nero: Marc Van Malderen
- Detective Van Zwam: Lieven De Roo
- Madame Blanche: Martien De Craene
- Dr. Ratsjenko: Guido Naessens
- Minor roles: Greet Devos, Simon André, Danny Galle, Dirk Opstaele, Ann Bellemans and Brigitte Louveaux.

== References in Nero ==
Marc Sleen referenced the opera in The Adventures of Nero story "Het Achtste Wereldwonder" ("The Eighth Wonder of the World") (1995–1996), where in strip 91 mention is made of a gang who call themselves "De Sluipende Armoede", which was the name of Sierens' theatre company.
