= Ricardo (comics) =

Publication information
- Publisher: Standaard Uitgeverij (Belgium)
- First appearance: The Adventures of Nero: De IJzeren Kolonel (1956-1957).
- Created by: Marc Sleen

Ricardo is a Flemish comic book character and the main antagonist in The Adventures of Nero series by Marc Sleen. He is a ruthless maffiosi who hates Nero with a passion. Together with Geeraard de Duivel and Matsuoka Ricardo is Nero's most frequent opponent, appearing in at least 24 albums, even surviving several seemingly deaths.

== Character ==
Ricardo is a gangster with a distinctive stereotypical Italian appearance, down to his crooked nose and black curly moustache. Yet in later albums it is revealed that he was in fact born on the Isle of Malta. Ricardo knows no mercy, can't be trusted and doesn't shy away from shooting anyone who gets in his way. He often misses or only makes a hole in people's hats. Still, sometimes he does wound his opponents, like Abraham Tuizentfloot in "Het Spook van Zoetendaal" ("The Ghost of Zoetendaal") (1979-1980) and Jan Spier in "Het Jaar van Ricardo" ("Ricardo's Year") (1987), but in both cases it's just a grazing shot. Ricardo has murdered people too, like his accomplice Alfredo and a sea captain

Ricardo often engages in bank robberies, kidnappings or ransom crimes. In later stories he tries to act revenge on Nero many times, but always fails. He is a member of several criminal organisaties, such as the Medellín cartel and the "Bende van de Miljardair" Ricardo is also a close friend of Belgian politician José Happart, whom he asks to give his best wishes in "Het Jaar van Ricardo" ("Ricardo's Year") (1987)

== Character history ==
He made his first appearance in De IJzeren Kolonel ("The Iron Colonel") (1956-1957), in which he and his accomplice Alfredo try to steal the fortune of the album's titular character. The plan fails and the duo are jailed. In a later story, De Vliegende Handschoen ("The Flying Glove") (1957) they are freed. Alfredo tries to better his life, but Ricardo has no interest in this and shoots him dead. In the same story Ricardo steals Nero's equipment to operate the flying glove so that the object can rob banks for him. Ricardo returns in "De Spekschieter" ("The Bacon Shooter") (1964), in which he steals the inheritance of Abraham Tuizentfloot and flees to an Italian island. In "De Gouden Kabouter" ("The Golden Gnome") (1968) Richardo collaborates with two accomplices, Juul and John, to steal a golden gnome and melt him. Near the end of the story Richardo falls in the molten gold himself and seemingly dies.

In "De Kakelende Kaketoe" ("The Clucking Cockatoo") (1970) he appears to be alive and well and is Nero's opponent in a treasure hunt. In "De Verdwenen Ming" ("The Lost Ming") (1975) he steals a Ming vase in which Nero is captured. His accomplice in that album is named Sylvio, but in "De V-Machine" ("The V-Machine") (1979) he is teamed again with Alfredo from "De IJzeren Kolonel" who apparently wasn't shot dead at all or is perhaps a twin brother of the first Alfredo. They both steal the V-Machine in the story, working for a rich, old man. In "Het Spook van Zoetendaal" ("The Ghost of Zoetendaal") (1979-1980) Ricardo disguises himself as a ghost to scare people away and kidnap people to ransom them. In "Papa Papoea" (1980) ("Daddy Papoea") Ricardo works with Alfredo again to steal the crown juwels of Petoetje's father, Papa Papoea. In "De Vierkante Mannen" ("The Square Men") (1980) Ricardo escapes from prison, but he is jailed again by the end of the story. In "Het Gouden Hart" (1981) ("The Golden Hart") Ricardo steals several solid golden hearts from the character Piet Peerdezaag and in "De Gouden Patatten" ("The Golden Potatoes") (1984) he steals Nero's golden potatoes. In "De Zwarte Toren" ("The Black Tower") (1983) he is revealed to have escaped once again and made de Zwarte Toren in Brussels his hide-out. In "Het Jaar van Ricardo" ("Ricardo's Year") (1987) Ricardo sets up a huge and complicated plot to steal Nero's fortune, but fails again. Near the end of the story he decides to leave Belgium and returns to his homeland. Not for long, however, because in "De Kleine Pieterman" ("The Lesser Weever") (1987) Ricardo returns again to steal a lesser weever whom Nero plans to deliver to emperor Hirohito of Japan. In "De Gelukbrenger" ("The Luck Bringer") (1988) Ricardo steals a winning lottery number, but plummets to his doom into the Vesuvius volcano. He wouldn't reappear for several albums.

Author Marc Sleen had intended Ricardo's death to be terminal, but in "De Drie Wrekers" ("The Three Vigilantes") (1992) it is revealed that Ricardo is still alive and even collaborates with other old antagonists of Nero, Ratsjenko and Matsuoka in a plot to kill Nero. In "De Kroon van Elizabeth" ("The Crown of Elizabeth") (1993) Ricardo steals the crown of Elizabeth II and in "De Steen van Abraham" ("Abraham's Stone") (1993) he kidnaps Abraham Tuizentfloot, who has swallowed a diamond from this crown. In "De Hond van Pavlov" ("Pavlov's Dog") (1994) Ricardo works for an envious mad scientist so his pet dog can bite off Nero's nose. Ricardo is hired by Geeraard de Duivel in "De Duivelsklauw" ("The Devil's Claw") (1995) In "Operatie Ratsjenko" ("Operation Ratsjenko") (1996) Ricardo teams up again with Matsuoka and Ratsjenko. When Tuizentfloot gets the Midas touch in "De Roos van Sakhti" ("Sakhti's Rose") (1996) he is kidnapped by Ricardo. In the final Nero album "Zilveren Tranen" ("Silver Tears") (2002) Ricardo teams up with all the big antagonists in the series to murder Nero for once and all, but like all of them he is killed off for good.
