= List of Dramatical Murder episodes =

This is a list of episodes of the anime series Dramatical Murder. The anime was announced to air in summer 2014. The anime aired on July 6, 2014, and was streamed on Crunchyroll. The series has seven musical themes: one opening and six ending themes. "SLIP ON THE PUMPS" by GOATBED is the main opening theme while "BOWIE KNIFE", also performed by GOATBED, is the ending theme used in episodes 1 to 6, and 11. From episode 7 to 10 and 12, each episode's ending theme differed and was sung by the artists that performed the ending themes for DRAMAtical Murder re:connect for the characters' respective episodes. "BY MY SIDE" and "Lullaby Blue" by Kanako Itō was used for episodes 7 and 9, respectively. "Felt" by Seiji Kimura was used for episode 8, and "Soul Grace" by VERTUEUX for episode 10. For the last episode, "Angels (天使達)" by GOATBED was used.

A DVD/Blu-ray was released on December 24, 2014, with all twelve episodes. Along with an original soundtrack and a drama CD titled Welcome to Dramatical Tea Shop Cyan Moon (ドラマティカル喫茶 ・ シアンムーンへようこそ, Dramatical Kissa Cyan Moon he Yōkoso), a special OVA called Data_xx_Transitory, which features the bad endings of the game, was included. On September 21, 2014, following the airing of the final episode, the official anime website announced that there will be a live reading event on February 1, 2015, titled Data_12.5_Recitation. Atsushi Kisaichi, Ryōta Takeuchi, Hiroki Takahashi, Satoshi Hino, Kenichirou Matsuda, Masatomo Nakazawa, and Yūichi Iguchi have been confirmed to be attending.

On June 21, 2015, Madman Entertainment announced at the Supanova Pop Culture Expo that it has licensed the series for Australian and New Zealand release. On July 16, 2015, Sentai Filmworks announced the license to the series for North American release in English on DVD and Blu-ray on November 24, 2015.

== Episode list ==
No.	Title	Directed by	Written by	Original release date
1	"Data_01_Login"	Kazuya Miura	Touko Machida	July 6, 2014
During work at Junk Shop Mediocrity, Aoba Seragaki goes out on a delivery with his Allmate, Ren, and encounters his childhood friend, Koujaku, and his Allmate, Beni. After a short conversation, Aoba makes his delivery to Yoshie and is forced to stay until nightfall. On his way home, Aoba is harassed by members of the Ribstiez group, Bug Bomb, but is saved by his friend and leader of Dry Juice, Mizuki. Mizuki voices his concerns of Ribstiez being overshadowed by the popular cyber game, Rhyme, and tells Aoba of the mysterious disappearances of several Ribstiez groups, rumored to be the works of the mythical group, Morphine. As they part ways, a Rhyme battle soon starts near Aoba and he observes it before meeting up with his old friends, Virus and Trip. The game is soon interrupted by a police officer, Akushima, causing Aoba to hurry back home. After eating with his grandmother, Tae, Aoba opens the automatic download he received earlier to find out it was an old-fashioned game called "Silent Oath", though he is baffled by its contents. The next day, Aoba goes out on another delivery when he and Ren are pulled into a forced Rhyme battle by a figure in a rabbit costume. The player addresses Aoba as "Sly Blue", which confuses Aoba, as he has no recollection of ever playing Rhyme before. After being continuously attacked, Aoba has a headache and his persona suddenly changes. Aoba then easily defends himself from the player's attacks, muttering "Death and destruction".
2	"Data_02_Crack"	Fumio Itō	Tōko Machida	July 13, 2014
Directly after Aoba's first attack, his normal personality reappears with no memories of what he just did. The mysterious player has his rabbit Allmates relentlessly attack Aoba and Ren again, which causes Aoba's other personality to resurface and seemly destroy the Rhyme Field, ending the battle. Aoba's and Ren's unconscious bodies are safely taken back to Mediocrity by a man wearing a gas mask, who called Aoba "Master". When they awaken, Aoba and Ren both find themselves with no memories of how the battle ended. At night, Aoba calls Virus and Trip to ask them if he played Rhyme before since his memory from a few years ago is hazy. While hanging around in an alley with Morphine's tag art, they claim that Aoba never played Rhyme. When Koujaku comes over to stay for the night, Aoba explains to him what happened to him and is advised to be more careful. The next morning, Aoba meets the masked man outside the junk shop, who introduces himself as Clear and addresses Aoba as "Master" again, stating he came to Aoba because he heard his voice. Bewildered, Aoba sends Clear away and is visited by the young man who forced him into Rhyme.
3	"Data_03_Presage"	Tetsurō Suzuki	Satoko Sekine	July 20, 2014
The young man silently purchases an item from Aoba, leaving the shop without identifying himself. When returning home from work that evening, Aoba finds the young man in his bedroom, who reveals to Aoba that he was the person in the rabbit costume that forced him in the Rhyme battle. The teenager demands a rematch with Aoba and threatens to destroy Ren if he doesn't. Clear arrives via veranda to Aoba's room, telling the intruder to not hurt his "Master". Koujaku soon joins the group, and a scuffle initiates between him and the teenager. Tae breaks them up and the group settles down in the kitchen, where the young man introduces himself as Noiz. The next day, Aoba and Koujaku visit Mizuki in hopes of cheering him up, as he has been depressed about losing more of his team members to Rhyme. The following day, Noiz visits the junk shop again and becomes the object of interest for the young siblings Kio, Nao, and Mio. While Noiz brushes off Kio's and Nao's attempts to tackle him, he picks up Mio and kisses her palm, telling her that girls shouldn't be rowdy, much to everyone else's shock. After the kids run out of the shop, Aoba scolds Noiz for his actions, who takes it with cool indifference, and abruptly kisses Aoba on the lips, much to his embarrassment. Noiz invites Aoba to join his Rhyme team, Ruff Rabbit, and to start playing Rhyme again, but Aoba refuses. He then receives call from Yoshie, informing him that Tae hurt her back and goes to carry her home. At night, Tae secretly meets with Toue's assistant, Takahashi, outside the house, who muses over the fact that Aoba is alive. Notes: Shortly after the episode aired, the anime production team posted a formal apology on their official Twitter account for the episode's low quality, which contains numerous errors, such as off-model characters, irregular proportions of the characters shifting between frames, and characters' voices not syncing correctly with the mouth flaps. They explained that, due to circumstances, an unfinished version of the episode was aired unintentionally and were working on retakes. They re-broadcast the online version of the episode on July 26 in superior quality. Additionally, they also reworked the first and second episodes' quality, as the animation quality was also lacking in these episodes.
4	"Data_04_Disappearance"	Kumiko Habara	Tōko Machida	July 27, 2014
Tae denies having any connections to Aoba and asks what Takahashi want from her. Inside, Aoba watches a live interview of the owner of the pleasure area Platinum Jail, Toue, and ridicules the man's speech of "perfect happiness". Once Tae enters the house, she lies to Aoba before both of them return to their bedroom. As Aoba muses over his contentment for his current life, he hears singing outside his window and finds Clear on his rooftop. Clear explains the song he was singing is called the "Jellyfish Song" he made up himself and used to sing to his grandfather, who has died. When Clear questions Aoba about why humans live the way they do when they are bound to die, Aoba says that humans want to live their lives happily and leave proof of their existence before they do. Pleased that Aoba taught him something and likes his voice, Clear sings to him as he goes to sleep. In Platinum Jail, Takahashi informs Toue that Tae refused to help him once again. The next day, Koujaku is notified by his teammates that Mizuki and the rest of Dry Juice have disappeared. He informs Aoba and they find that all of Dry Juice's tags has been painted over by Morphine's tags. Virus and Trip claim that they don't know what happened to Dry Juice, but promise to contact Aoba if they find any news about them. Noiz then shows up and challenges Aoba to play Rhyme, but Koujaku interferes on Aoba's behalf and starts another scuffle with Noiz. After Akushima arrives with the police, Aoba separates from Koujaku and receives another download of "Silent Oath", showing a character being taken away from the knight. Confused by the game's contents once more, Aoba heads home, only to find Tae is nowhere to be seen. As Aoba discovers unconscious men with Morphine's tags on their necks, Mink makes himself known to Aoba and knocks him out.
5	"Data_05_Error"	Fumihiro Ueno	Satoko Sekine	August 3, 2014
Aoba wakes up in Scratch's hideout and quickly suffers a beating from Mink's men on his orders. As Aoba struggles to break free, his other personality briefly takes over and orders the Scratch members to stop before falling unconscious. When Aoba awakens safely in a bedroom with Ren and his bag, Mink states to Aoba that his aware of Aoba's special "voice" and will help him find Tae if Aoba obeys him in return. Although reluctant, Aoba agrees and heads back to his house, meeting up with Clear and Koujaku. Koujaku is distrustful of Mink since his group is made up of criminals, but relents once Aoba explains that Mink will help him find Tae. The group then discovers that Noiz is spying on them and recruits him to their mission. Despite some tension, the group is able to track down Tae's location and Clear guides them to an abandoned warehouse area. They are attack by hooded men, which turns out to be the missing members of Dry Juice. Aoba goes ahead and finds Tae and crazed Mizuki. Mizuki confirms to Aoba that Dry Juice had joined with Morphine and invites Aoba to be a part of it. Knowing something is wrong with Mizuki, Aoba refuses and Mizuki retaliates by putting a knife to Tae's throat. Distressed, Aoba suddenly pulls himself into Mizuki's mind and see his fears of Ribstiez being overshadowed by Rhyme. He meets the real Mizuki, who explains he joined Morphine in order to preserve Dry Juice, but was double-crossed and they were forcefully turned into mindless puppets. Aoba's other persona surfaces again and urges Aoba to "destroy", causing Mizuki to mentally break down in the real world.
6	"Data_06_Revelation"	Fumio Maezono	Tōko Machida	August 10, 2014
As Mizuki breaks down, Aoba is pulled into a Rhyme Field and meets Toue. Toue addresses the baffled Aoba with familiarity, and encourages him to discover who he truly is before disappearing. Aoba awakens in the real world, but quickly collapses after spotting an unconscious Mizuki. At Oval Tower, Takahashi reports to Toue about the data they received on Aoba's powers, and that he had sent the police to apprehend him. Later that night at their house, Tae informs Aoba that Mizuki and the rest of Dry Juice were taken to a hospital, but all of them are in a comatose state. She explains that Mizuki was being controlled by Morphine, who works for Toue, and how she was once a neuroplasticity researcher for Toue's labs twenty years ago. Tae quit once she learned that her research was being abused for Toue's brainwashing experiments, but upon her recent refusal to come back to the research labs, Toue used Mizuki to force her to cooperate. She concludes that Toue desires to brainwash all of the citizens on the island and sell his research to other countries. After sending Koujaku and the others home, she tells Aoba that he possesses an ability called Scrap that allows him to put his consciousness into the minds of others with his voice, and depending how he uses it, he can control or destroy them like he did with Mizuki's consciousness. Their discussion is cut short when Virus calls Aoba and warns that police are coming to arrest him. Aoba and Koujaku, who is confronting Mink about his intentions for Aoba, then receive an invitation to Platinum Jail. Resolved, Aoba tells Koujaku that he's going to Platinum Jail to stop Toue. Aoba flees his house when the police arrives, prompting Koujaku and the others to begin their search for him.
7	"Data_07_Distance"	Tadayoshi Sasaki	Satoko Sekine	August 17, 2014
Aoba and Koujaku meet each other at the entrance of Platinum Jail, and the former scolds the latter for going off on his own. Once they enter Platinum Jail, Toue makes a live announcement that a special event will be held for Platinum Jail's 10th anniversary while Aoba notices the crowd's dazed expressions before the announcement is concluded. Later, Koujaku spots a man, Ryuho, entering a club and anxiously chases after him with Aoba following behind. While looking for Koujaku in the crowd, Aoba faints from the club's drug lights and collapses against Ryuho. When Aoba awakens in Ryuho's room, Ryuho reveals to him that he is a tattoo artist and saw Aoba once before, and could sense he was different from others. Ryuho expresses his intentions to forcefully tattoo Aoba's back in order to see what "flowers" would bloom, but a furious Koujaku intervenes. Ryuho excitedly greets Koujaku, deeming him as his greatest work and provokes him further by mentioning his past and how Koujaku killed his mother. Enraged, Koujaku's tattoos spreads across his body as he goes berserk and fatally slash Ryuho. To stop Koujaku's attacks, Aoba uses Scrap on him and enters his mind, seeing his past memories after he left Midorijima with his mother. The real Koujaku explains that he was the illegitimate son of a yakuza leader and was forced to undergo a long, painful tattooing process by Ryuho on his father's orders. On the final day, Koujaku, unable to bear the pain anymore, went on mindless rampage and killed everyone in the estate, including his mother. Koujaku tells Aoba that he tried to commit suicide, but didn't because he wanted to see Aoba again. Aoba soothes Koujaku's guilt, encouraging him not to lose to his cursed tattoos and Ryuho. After "destroying" the part of Koujaku haunted by the past, Aoba and Koujaku head to their lodging and reminisce about their childhood. Ryuho manages to live long enough to contact Toue and reports that his "experiment" was a success. Later that night, Aoba looks for Ren and spots a shadowy figure in living room.
8	"Data_08_Reply"	Fumio Itō	Tōko Machida	August 24, 2014
While searching for Ren, Aoba finds Noiz in the living room, tinkering with Ren. Furious, Aoba takes Ren away from Noiz aggressively, causing Noiz to accidentally scratch himself with a screwdriver. Aoba notices the injury and apologizes for hurting Noiz. While treating the wound, Aoba receives another download of "Silent Oath", and Noiz attempts to trace the source to the sender but to no avail. Aoba inquires what Noiz is doing in Platinum Jail, prompting the latter to show the former that he also got an invitation. Later, Ren informs Aoba that Noiz simply removed a worm from his system. The next morning, Aoba apologies for snapping at Noiz, who merely brushes it off, claiming that he only did it on a whim because he thought that Ren was the reason Aoba beat him in Rhyme. Noiz asks Aoba why he is being nice to him, and suspects that is trying to gain something from helping him. Before Aoba could respond, Noiz takes off to shop for food and Aoba follows him. They are soon ambushed by members of Morphine, and Noiz chases after a masked man and is brainwashed by a strange song. When Noiz attacks him, Aoba uses Scrap to enter his mind and learns of Noiz's sad childhood. Aoba meets the real Noiz, who explains that he cannot feel pain and his parents regarded him as a burden. As a result, they locked him in his room, forcing Noiz to grow up hurt and alone. Aoba comforts Noiz, promising to be by his side, teach him about pain, and have the Rhyme battle that Noiz wanted. After destroying Noiz's "world", the pair awaken in the real world and discovers that Noiz can feel pain now. As they walk back home, Aoba senses that his other personality is becoming a stronger presence within him.
9	"Data_09_Echt"	Fumihiro Ueno	Satoko Sekine	August 31, 2014
Aoba and an injured Noiz are ambushed by Morphine members when Clear appears and easily defeats them. When one of men tries to hurt Aoba, Clear violently beats the man up until Aoba stops him, allowing the Morphine member the chance to throw acid on Clear and escape. At their lodging, Clear refuses to remove his mask in front of Aoba, explaining his grandfather told him never show his face to anybody because it wasn't "normal" like other humans and is afraid that Aoba will hate him once he saw his face. Aoba assures Clear that he could never hate him and takes off his mask, revealing Clear's normal-looking face. Afterwards, Clear cooks for Aoba when strange music plays on the TV, causing Aoba immense pain. Clear explains that Toue uses the "Dye Music" song to brainwash people. Later, Clear questions Ren why he doesn't call Aoba "Master" even though he is just an Allmate, with Ren saying that he is only doing what Aoba wants from him. While Koujaku and Noiz rest from their injuries, Aoba and Clear goes out to see Oval Tower. They are soon confronted by masked figures, addressing Clear as their "brother" and revealing that have the same face as Clear. The two men, the Alphas, explain that Toue sent them to dispose of Clear, who was supposed to be trashed long ago if Clear's "grandfather" (who was in charge of the disposal) didn't save him. The Alphas attack, but Clear is unable to fight back due a safety mechanism inside him that prevents him attacking his fellows androids. Despite this, Clear tries to attack the Alphas, causing his circuits to fry themselves out. While fleeing, Aoba learns the reason why Clear considers him his "Master" was because of his voice is similar to Toue's, though Clear affirms that Aoba is his only "Master". The Alphas corners them on a rooftop and mocks Clear's desire to be human, but Clear rebuffs them, saying he enjoys experiencing emotions. Determined to protect Aoba, Clear stabs himself in the head to rid himself of the safety mechanism. Distressed, Aoba briefly use Scrap on Clear before pulling himself out and allowing Clear to destroy the Alphas with his "Jellyfish Song". Gravely damaged, Clear collapses in Aoba's arms and he calls him by his name before shutting down, much to Aoba's grief. Outside Platinum Jail, Mink and his gang prepare to smuggle weapons into the area.
10	"Data_10_Faith"	Shunji Yoshida	Tōko Machida	September 7, 2014
Noiz performs emergency repairs on Clear, but informs Aoba and Koujaku that he is unable to properly fix him. Aoba tells Noiz and Koujaku about his Scrap ability and his suspicion that Toue is planning to use Plantimum Jail's Special Anniversary Event to brainwash the citizens on the island. Aoba is resolved to stop him, but doesn't want Koujaku and the others to be involved, as he fears that it would put them in danger. Later that night, Mink calls Aoba, and the two plan to break into Oval Tower by themselves. Mink hands Aoba a USB flash drive to put into Ren with a program that will disable the security Allmates patrolling the building. Although Aoba vehemently refuses to use it, as it could possibly destroy Ren, the latter assures the former that he is okay with the plan. Aoba and Mink infiltrate Oval Tower's control room and upload the program to its system, and although Ren appears to be fine, Aoba notices he is acting strange. They are cornered by Akushima and several officers while going up to the top floor, forcing them to take cover in a room. Mink gives Aoba a gun to defend himself with, but Aoba refuses to use it, prompting Mink to hurt him until his other personality takes over and uses his ability to order their pursuers away. Aoba uses Scrap on Mink and learns that Mink is planning to commit suicide after taking revenge on Toue, who killed his people in an attempt to obtain their secret art of using smell to manipulate the mind. Aoba finds the true Mink bound in chains and tries to free him, but is rejected. When Aoba awakens, Mink remarks that they both share the scent of death. As they continue their trek into the tower, Aoba urges Mink to live.
11	"Data_11_Fixer"	Ryūuzō Anaba	Tōko Machida	September 14, 2014
As Mink and Aoba venture higher up into Oval Tower, Aoba spots specks of light fluttering on Ren's face, but Ren coldly brushes him off. When Mink and Aoba are separated while escaping the guards, Aoba encounters a holographic Sei, who is pleased to finally meet Aoba. Sei explains to the bewildered Aoba that he was the one who sent demos of "Silent Oath" and the invitation to Platinum Jail, guiding him to Oval Tower so Aoba could "break" him with his power. As Sei is at his limit, he encourages Aoba to hurry and come to him before his hologram disappears. Aoba is then captured by Morphine, and learns that Virus and Trip are the leaders of the group. They reveal that they were they ones that erased Aoba's memories of his time playing Rhyme in order to keep him hidden from Toue, as they wanted Aoba to themselves. Additionally, they tell Aoba that Sei is his older twin brother, and both were designer babies created by Toue using Tae's research. However, Aoba was born dead and taken away by Tae to protect him from Toue's experiments, but was revived later on. Since Sei also has the power of Scrap in his eyes, he was kept as a lab rat by Toue and, due to the experiments performed on him, is now on the verge of death. Mink, Koujaku, Noiz, and Clear arrive and rescue Aoba, and Noiz informs him that Ren is infected by a worm. Aoba and Mink press forward to stop Toue while Koujaku and the others fight off the guards. They find a hologram of Toue, who attempts to use Scrap on Mink to stop his plan of dying. However, as Aoba already implanted his words into Mink's mind with Scrap earlier, Toue's attempt failed. Mink orders Aoba to turn back while he runs off to find the real Toue. Ren, becoming more hostile because of the worm, bites Aoba, causing something to flow into him.
12	"Data_12_Dawn"	Takayuki Kuriyama; Kazuya Miura	Tōko Machida	September 21, 2014
As Ren's memories pour inside Aoba's mind, Aoba uses Scrap on himself in order to speak with him. Aoba sees that Ren is falling apart due to the worm. Ren reveals he was originally a part of Aoba's consciousness, his "restraint" that was created to monitor his "desire" (the other Aoba) so that it wouldn't take control of him. However, there was a period of time when Aoba's "desire" took hold of him and Ren could no longer influence him from inside his mind, prompting him to transfer his consciousness into the Allmate's dog body when Aoba discovered it. As a physical being, Ren was able to influence Aoba more easily, but because of Virus and Trip tampering with Aoba's memory in the past, Ren had forgotten his original purpose until the worm infected him. Ren expresses the pain and inferiority he felt during his time as an Allmate, fearing that Aoba would abandon him as he was an older Allmate model, as well as his wish to be with Aoba forever. Despite that, Ren explains that he can no longer perform his duty as Aoba's restraint, and he must disappear. Aoba tells Ren that he is precious to him and doesn't wish for Ren to leave him. Afterwards, the two find Toue and engage in a Rhyme Battle with him and his Allmate Usui, which was made with a part of Sei's consciousness. Once they defeat Toue, they go to see Sei as Toue commits suicide. Sei pleads with Aoba to destroy him and convinces him to accept the "other Aoba", who merely wants to be acknowledged by him. Sei bids farewell to Aoba and Ren, and uses the last of his strength to obliterate Toue's scheme. Mink's Allmate Tori, with his AI chip inserted in Mink's bike, takes Aoba out of Oval Tower as it collapses from bombs planted by Mink's gang. Everyone survives, but Ren's consciousnesses has disappear from the Allmate's body, much to Aoba's despair. A year later, Aoba and the others continue on with their lives peacefully. One day after work, Aoba receives an anonymous message (actually from Virus and Trip) and a demo of "Silent Oath" leading to the hospital, where Aoba discovers Ren now in Sei's body and happily welcomes him home.
OVA	"Data_xx_Transitory"	Kumiko Habara; Nanako Fujisawa	Satoko Sekine	December 24, 2014
