= Piet Fluwijn en Bolleke =

Belgian comic strip

Publication information
- Publisher: (Belgium)
- First appearance: Piet Fluwijn (1944), Bolleke (1945)
- Created by: Marc Sleen

Piet Fluwijn en Bolleke was a Belgian gag-a-day comic strip series drawn by Marc Sleen from 1944 until 1965. It was continued by artists Hurey and Jean-Pol until 1974.

On 1 January 2030, all comics series by Marc Sleen, including Piet Fluwijn en Bolleke, will enter public domain, in accordance with the Marc Sleen Foundation.

== Concept ==
Piet Fluwijn en Bolleke was a classic family comic strip, drawn by Sleen. All gags center around a father, Piet Fluwijn, and his naughty, but innocent little son, Bolleke. The mother of the family is sometimes seen, but seldom plays a large role. The series was inspired by the German gag-a-day comic Vater und Sohn by Erich Ohser.

== History ==
On Christmas Day 1944 the first gag was published in the Flemish magazine Ons Volk Ontwaakt, but for about a year Piet Fluwijn was the only character. On December 27, 1945, the comic strip was moved to the weekly youth supplement of the magazine Ons Volkske. Sleen then introduced Fluwijn's son, Bolleke, who was still called "Bommeke" in those days. From April 3, 1947, on the series was also published in 't Kapoentje, the weekly youth supplement of the newspaper Het Volk, where the character was named "Bolletje". They were also translated into French and published in Le Petit Luron, the weekly youth supplement of the magazine Samedi, under the name Miche et Celestin Radis.

In 1965 Sleen decided to terminate all his other comic strips in favor of The Adventures of Nero. "Piet Fluwijn en Bolleke" too was cancelled on April 14, 1965. Cartoonists Hurey and Jean-Pol drew a new version of the series for the comics magazine Pats, but in 1974 the series came to a permanent halt.

== Albums ==
Between 1956 and 1965 ten albums were published. These albums did not contain all the gags and the gags were not published in chronological order. Between 2010 and 2018, 26 albums were published containing the complete series of 850 gags drawn by Marc Sleen between 1945 and 1965 in chronological order and additional information written by Yves Kerremans, with new covers drawn by Dirk Stallaert.

== Crossover with Sleen's other series ==
Marc Sleen enjoyed giving his characters cameos in The Adventures of Nero. In the story De Blauwe Toekan ("The Blue Toucan") (1948) Bolleke can be seen on a local fair and later in the story next to Jan Spier's French fries store. In "Beo de Verschrikkelijke" ("Beo the Horrible") (1952) Fluwijn and Bolleke are seen in the crowd at the harbour and in "De Brollebril" ("The Bogus Glasses") (1960) they are among the many characters who come to donate Nero money. In "De Muurloper" ("The Wall Walker") (1995) they make another cameo.

== In popular culture ==
In 1971 Herman De Coninck and Piet Piryns interviewed Marc Sleen for the magazine Humo. As a tribute they signed their article with the pseudonyms "Herman de Keunink" (a nod to Sleen's series Oktaaf Keunink) and Piet Fluwijns.

Flemish comedian Urbanus is a huge fan of Bolleke and a personal friend of Sleen. When Sleen retired in 2002 Urbanus came to sing a homage to him, "Ode aan Marc Sleen", dressed up as Bolleke. The song also mentions his love for the comic. Urbanus' own comics, such as Urbanus, are also inspired by "Piet Fluwijn en Bolleke".

Piet Fluwijn en Bolleke also had a cameo in the Agent 327 album "De Golem van Antwerpen" ("The Golem of Antwerp") (2002), where they visit the Antwerp Zoo.

The characters can also be seen on a wall dedicated to characters from Sleen's other series, The Adventures of Nero, at the Sint-Goriksplein/Place Saint-Géry in Brussels, where it is part of the Brussels' Comic Book Route.
