= Gaston Durnez =

Flemish journalist (1928–2019)

Gaston Cyriel Durnez (9 September 1928 – 22 November 2019) was a Flemish columnist, journalist and writer. He worked for the newspaper De Standaard, writing several humorous-satirical columns, and was one of the founders of the Encyclopedie van de Vlaamse Beweging. He was also the writer of De Geschiedenis van Sleenovia (1965), a comic strip by Willy Vandersteen and Edward De Rop, featuring characters from Marc Sleen's The Adventures of Nero, which was subject of a fierce copyright battle between the newspapers De Standaard and Het Volk.

== Bibliography ==
- Muzenissen (1954)
- Rijmenam (1956)
- Wiltzang (1960)
- Hooikoorts (1962)
- Kermis (1963)
- Maria Rosseels (1963)
- Slalom (1963)
- Duizend kussen voor iedereen (1965)
- Sire (1966)
- Denkend aan Nederland (1968)
- Zondag in de week (1969)
- Mijn leven onder de Belgen (1970)
- Jullie worden later gek dan wij (1971)
- Kijk, paps, een Belg (1973)
- Kleinbeeld (1973)
- Sun Corner Bar (1980)
- Een vogel in de brievenbus (1981)
- Vlaamse schrijvers, vijfentwintig portretten (1982)
- De engel op het eiland (1983)
- Loekie Zvonik (1983)
- Vlaamse humor omnibus Deel: 3 (1983)
- Van Leeuwtje tot D.C. (1984)
- De Standaard (1985)
- Klein Belgisch woordenboek (1985)
- De goede Fee, pasfoto van Felix Timmermans (1986)
- God is een Sinjoor (1987)
- Zeg mij waar de bloemen zijn (1988)
- Wij zijn allemaal amateurs (1991)
- Het lied mijner kindsheid, of Een lepel herinneringen (1992)
- Wie betaalt het gelach? (1994)
- Paspoort (1998)
- Felix Timmermans (2000)

== See also ==
- Flemish literature
- Flemish movement
