= Doris Dobbel =

- Author: Marc Sleen
- Current status/schedule: Terminated.
- Launch date: 8 April 1950
- End date: 1965
- Genre(s): Humor comics, Gag-a-day comics

Doris Dobbel was a Belgian gag-a-day comics series, written and drawn by Marc Sleen, between 8 April 1950 and 1965 and published in the magazine De Middenstand.

On 1 January 2030, all comics series by Marc Sleen, including Doris Dobbel, will enter public domain, in accordance with the Marc Sleen Foundation.

== Concept ==
The series was centered around Doris Dobbel, an obese butcher who enjoyed smoking cigars. Many gags center around him trying to please his customers or attempting to get rich, while his vain wife nags about money. Other gags are built around his never-ending rivalry with his neighbour Jan Janssen, who also owns a butcher's shop. (The character Jan Janssen was a caricature of journalist Jan De Spot, who was a personal friend of Sleen and who was also caricatured as a rivalling neighbour in Sleen's other gag comic Oktaaf Keunink.

Like most of Sleen's other gag series Doris Dobbel came to an end when he dropped all his series in 1965 in favor of The Adventures of Nero.

== Legacy ==
Doris Dobbel has sometimes been unfavorably compared with Rik Clément's comics series Dees Dubbel, which ran in Ons Zondagsblad, consequently the same newspaper where Sleen published Oktaaf Keunink. However, Sleen's creation is five years older than Clément's and the series have nothing in common. Dees Dubbel is a straight humoristic adventure strip, while Doris Dobbel has always been a gag comic.

On November 9, 2010 a copy of De vrolijke avonturen van Doris Dobbel was auctioned for 12.000 euro, making it the highest price ever sold for a Dutch-language comic. The high bidding was influenced by its rarity. Only eight complete publications are known to exist.
