= Model sheet =

Reference document for drawing a character

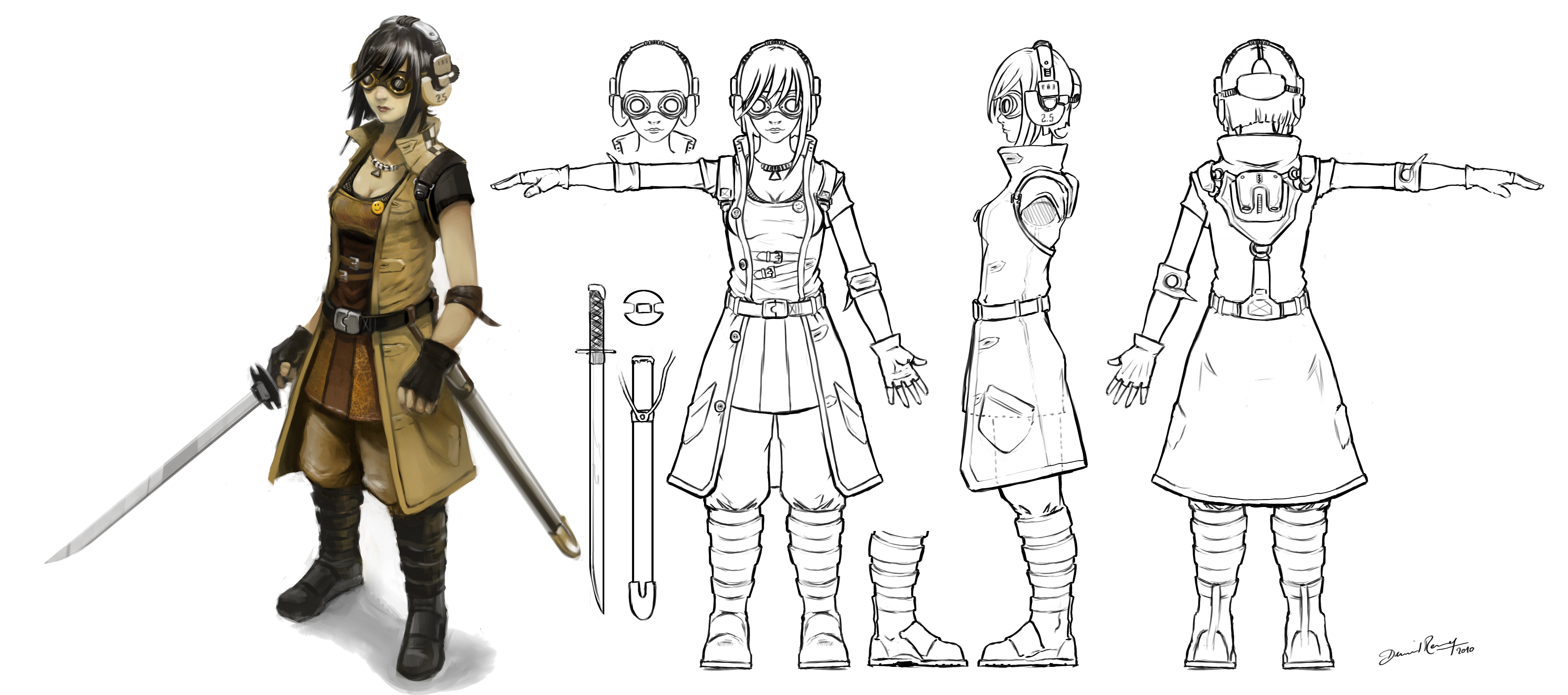
A sample model sheet from David Revoy's DVD tutorial 'Chaos&Evolutions'

In visual arts, a model sheet – also called a character board, character sheet, character study, or simply study – is a document used to help standardize the appearance, poses, and gestures of a character in arts such as animation, comics, and video games.

Model sheets are required when multiple artists are involved in the production of an animated film, game, or comic to help maintain continuity in characters from scene to scene. In animation, one animator may only do one shot out of the several hundred that are required to complete an animated feature film. A character not drawn according to the production's standardized model is referred to as off-model.

Model sheets are also used for references in 3D modeling to guide proper proportions of models.

== Purposes ==
Model sheets have also been used in the past to maintain graphic continuity over the years for long lasting cartoon productions of short or short features such as the Looney Tunes or Merrie Melodies series.

Model sheets are drawings of posed cartoon or comic strip characters that are created to provide a reference template for several artists who collaborate in the production of a lengthy or multiple-edition work of art such as a comic book, animated film or television series. Model sheets usually depict the character's head and body as they appear at various angles (a process known as "model rotation"), includes sketches of the character's hands and feet, and shows several basic facial expressions.

Model sheets ensure that, despite the efforts of several or many artists, their work exhibits unity, as if one artist created the drawings (that is, they are "on model"). They show the character's structure, proportions, attire, and body language. Often, several sheets are required to depict a character's subtler emotional and physical attitudes.

Depending on the whim of animation direction, deviations from the model may be permitted in the course of final animation; this "tightness" of model is a major distinguishing factor in overall animation style, as it constitutes a tradeoff between expressiveness and smoothness/consistency. As such, the usage of models varies widely between studios and projects.

Model sheets can also be used in the construction of costumes or sculpted figurines.

== Specific annotations ==
Model sheets also provide notes that present specific information about how to develop particular features of the character, such as their head shape, hair length and style, size and position of the eyes and the mouth.

== Examples ==
Some model sheets are specific to particular completed or ongoing projects, whereas others are more general and inclusive of a studio's entire collection of characters. Animation studios besides Disney and fans also post model sheets on their Internet Web sites. Larry's Toon Institute provides a generic model sheet for the purpose of introducing the concept of model sheets.

== Copyright ==
Model sheets are not typically in the public domain, but are copyrighted material owned by the animation studio which created it.

Although model sheets originally are intended for artists who work for the studios that own the characters for which these templates are developed, other artists, such as those who create and sell fan art, use them to adapt the characters to their own uses.

== See also ==
- Character animation
- Glossary of comics terminology
