= Armand Pien =

Belgian weatherman

Armand Pien (Gent, 2 January 1920 – Gent, 22 September 2003) was a Belgian weatherman for 37 years. He was popular because his weather predictions were funny and somewhat cryptic. His show, "The Weather", was broadcast twice a week. It was described in 1985 as mixing "scientific reports with off-beat pranks and displays of bizarre fruits and vegetables grown by viewers".

After he retired from national television he had a daily (Monday – Friday) weather talk on the East Flanders department of Belgium national radio. He did this until the Friday before his death; he died the following Monday.

In 2005 a small museum was opened in Hoeilaart, Belgium, dedicated to him.

== Quotes ==
- "An autumn without storm is like a woman without curves."
- "After rain there will always be sunshine."
