= Het Rattenkasteel =

1948 comic book album

Het Rattenkasteel ("The Rat's Castle")
- Original 1952 album cover
- Date: 1948 (pre-published in newspapers) 1952 (in album format)
- Series: The Adventures of Nero
- Publisher: Uitgeverij Het Volk.

Creative team
- Writers: Marc Sleen
- Artists: Marc Sleen

Original publication
- Published in: De Nieuwe Gids
- Date of publication: September 8, 1948 to December 24, 1948.
- Language: Dutch

Chronology
- Preceded by: "Het Zeespook" (1948)
- Followed by: "De Erfenis van Nero" (1948–1949)

Het Rattenkasteel ("The Rat's Castle") is a 1948 comic book album in the Belgian comics series The Adventures of Nero by Marc Sleen. It's the fourth album in the series and acclaimed as one of Sleen's best. In the 2000s the story was collected and re-published by the Flemish newspapers Het Belang van Limburg and Gazet van Antwerpen in a special series entitled "De beste 10 volgens Marc Sleen" ("The best 10 according to Marc Sleen"), where Sleen choose his ten favorite "Nero" stories. He placed "Het Rattenkasteel" first.

== History ==
Sleen was inspired by the castle "Hof ter Brugge" in Erps-Kwerps and the nickname for castle "Onze-Lieve-Vrouw ten Hove" in Waarschoot, which was literally called "Het Rattenkasteel".

The story was pre-published in the Flemish newspaper De Nieuwe Gids from September 8 to December 24, 1948. As the character Detective Van Zwam was still the main protagonist of the series it initially ran in the newspaper as a "Van Zwam" story. When published in album format in 1953 it was titled as a "Nero" story, since Nero (comic book character) had already become the series' main protagonist by then. It was published in color when reprinted in the youth magazine 't Kapoentje in 1960.

== Plot ==
Nero (comic book character) suffers from sleeping sickness and looks for a more peaceful environment to stay. When meeting a fortune teller, Madame Blanche, he is informed that Detective Van Zwam will be in danger when he enters a castle named "The Rat's Castle" in Erps-Kwerps. Indeed, at that same time Van Zwam and his dog Tito are in the vicinity of said castle and hear that several people who once entered there never came back alive. A local farmer advises Van Zwam to ring the clock in the castle's bell tower in case of danger. The story then returns to Nero who enters the castle in fear that Van Zwam is in danger (unbeknownst to him Van Zwam didn't enter). Inside Nero encounters a huge rat, whom he manages to scare off, but is captured by the mad scientist Dr. Ratsjenko, who tries to murder him. Since Nero keeps dozing off he is an easy victim. Just when Ratsjenko wants to murder Nero the rat accidentally rings the bell tower clock, alarming everybody outside. Unfortunately for Nero the farmers don't come to his aid at all, but just run off. However, Zwam happens to hear the bell and enters the castle where he finds Nero. Ratsjenko has fled, but while Van Zwam and Nero try to find him they suddenly see a colossal rat of about two metres high. They panic and run away, while the reader discovers it was just Ratsjenko in a rat suit. Meanwhile, Nero and Van Zwam get back to their senses and re-enter the castle, destined to find Ratsjenko. They discover his secret hiding place, but are captured and tied up as Ratsjenko plans to trepan them for a brain transplant, where he wants to put human brains inside a rat's head. When Ratsjenko reaches for his chloroform he accidentally puts himself to sleep. At that precise moment Ratsjenko's rat happens to quarrel with his wife. She is opposed to Ratsjenko's plans, scares her husband off and gnaws Nero's ropes loose. As Nero prepares to untie Van Zwam he falls asleep again, while Ratsjenko awakes again. He prepares Nero for the operation and gives him some extra chloroform, which has the opposite effect on him. Now fully awake Nero knocks Ratsjenko unconscious and frees Van Zwam, but the evil doctor manages to escape yet again, taking Van Zwam's dog Tito with him.

As Nero and Van Zwam go out to look for Ratsjenko they stumble upon their good friend Jef Pedal and his family. The three men burrow their bikes and chase after Ratsjenko. Then Pedal, Van Zwam and Nero accidentally crash into Madame Blanche's covered wagon. Blanche is angry, but does help them finding out where Ratsjenko is hiding, namely in Louvain. Pedal, Van Zwam and Nero decide to enlist in the Katholieke Universiteit Leuven because Ratsjenko presumably hides there. One day Nero discovers Rasjenko is his medics professor and chases him, but is hindered by student riots and jailed for public disturbance. As Van Zwam and Pedal are thrown out of their apartment by their rent lord they suddenly hear Tito barking inside a building. Van Zwam manages to enter, but Pedal is caught by the police and put in the same cell as Nero. Once again Van Zwam is captured by Ratsjenko and prepared for a brain transplant operation. Ratsjenko's rat has already received a human brain, stolen from the university lab. Now hyper intelligent the rat orders all the other rats to educate themselves and rise against humanity.

The wife of Ratsjenko's rat is still around however and helps Nero and Pedal to escape. She leads them to Ratsjenko's hide-out. When Pedal and Nero break in Ratsjenko jumps inside a refrigerator and has his rats attack the intruders. Only when the female rat punishes her husband into obedience does the rat uprising fall apart. Ratsjenko, now completely frozen due to being inside the refrigerator for so long, is taken to the police department and sent off to an insane asylum.

== Political and cultural references within the story ==
The story makes reference to several things that were current when this story ran in the newspaper, including rationing cards in strip 2. In strip 47 Ratsjenko insults his rat's wife for being a "collaborator". The then current Louvain student riots are also referenced. At the time the University of Louvain was predominantly French, despite also having a lot of Dutch-language students. In the 1960s riots by Flemish students for education in their own language became so fierce that the university was split into a Dutch-language university in Louvain and a French department in Louvain-la-Neuve. In the story Nero gets beaten up during student riots and Madame Blanche's covered wagon is stolen by Flemish students in strip 125, "because she writes her name in French".

In strips 7 and 10 two of Sleen's colleagues can be recognized, namely journalist Jan De Spot and Alfred Raport, head of De Standaard.

Nero tries to chase away a rat in strip 42 by throwing books by author Louis Piérard at the creature's head.

In strip 151 the rats educate themselves and quote several famous authors and scientists, including Aristotle, Hamlet 's "To be or not to be" speech, the Lebesgue integration, Ivan Pavlov's test and the quote "The strongest are most powerful when they are alone" from Friedrich Schiller's play William Tell.

When battling the rats Jef Pedal quotes a line from Hendrik Conscience's The Lion of Flanders and Van Zwam tells his friends to think of the Six hundred Franchimontois.

== Continuity with later "Nero" stories ==
In strip 3–9 Nero and Jef Pedal are depicted with baby sons. Both children were never referred to again in later stories. Dr. Ratsjenko would make a comeback about half a century later in the albums "De Drie Wrekers" (1992), "Operatie Ratsjenko" (1996–1997) and "Zilveren Tranen" (2002).

Later "Nero" stories, such as "Zwoele Charlotte" (1973–1974), also used the sleeping disease as a plot device.

== Opera adaptation ==
Arne Sierens, Johan De Smet and Vincent D'Hondt adapted the story into an eponymous opera in 1984.

== Literary adaptation ==
In 2022 Don Vitalski wrote a novel, Terugkeer naar het Rattenkasteel, based on the Nero comic book Het Rattenkasteel.
