= De Ronde van Frankrijk =

Belgian gag cartoon comic strip series by Marc Sleen

Book cover of the 1992 compilation by Frans Lodewijckx. The caricatured cyclist in the yellow sweater is Lucien Teisseire.

De Ronde van Frankrijk (The Tour de France) was a Belgian gag cartoon comic strip series by Marc Sleen, in which he made a comedic report of every daily tournament of the annual cycling contest the Tour de France. Sleen drew the strip each year, from 1947 up until 1964, for the Flemish newspapers Het Vrije Volksblad and Het Volk.

On 1 January 2030, all comics series by Marc Sleen, including De Ronde van Frankrijk, will enter public domain, in accordance with the Marc Sleen Foundation.

== Concept ==
Each daily cartoon was a summarization of the tournament held the day before. Sleen drew caricatures of all famous cyclists and made puns on their names and typical cycling jargon. A running gag was the always losing Belgian team. He also gave famous politicians of the day a cameo appearance, including characters from his other comics series and the over-worked artist himself.

== History ==
Sleen first drew the series in 1947. In 1948 he travelled along with the other journalists and the Belgian team leader Romain Maes, but on all other occasions he remained at home, while listening to the live radio report. Often he drew the body of the winning cyclist of that day beforehand and waited with drawing the head until the winner was announced. When his cartoon was finished Sleen waited for a motorcyclist to pick up his drawing and drive back to the newspaper's office in Ghent, so it could be published in the extra sports edition later that evening.

The series was terminated in 1965, along with Sleen's other gag-a-day comics, when he left Het Volk for the newspaper De Standaard. Sleen also illustrated the cycling books Figuren uit de Tour and Humor en Tragiek uit de Tour by Jan Cornand and illustrated journalist Hubert Van De Vijver's reports. After Sleen left other artists tried to continue the series, but not with the same success.

== Book compilation ==
In 1992 all the cartoons were compiled into Frans Lodewijckx' book De Grote Rondes van Marc Sleen. Each chapter was enriched with commentaries of the newspapers' best reporters: Michel Casteels, Jan Cornand, Jérome Stevens, Willy Hofmans and André Blancke. Only the final installments of the 1948 and 1949 editions were lost and couldn't be retraced.

== Sources ==
- AUWERA, Fernand, en SMET, Jan, "Marc Sleen", Uitgeverij Edicon/Standaard Uitgeverij, Antwerpen, 1985, page 116–117
- LODEWIJCKX, Frans, De grote rondes van Marc Sleen, Uitgeverij Reinaert-Het Volk, Gent, 1992
