= Hoeilaart =

- Municipality
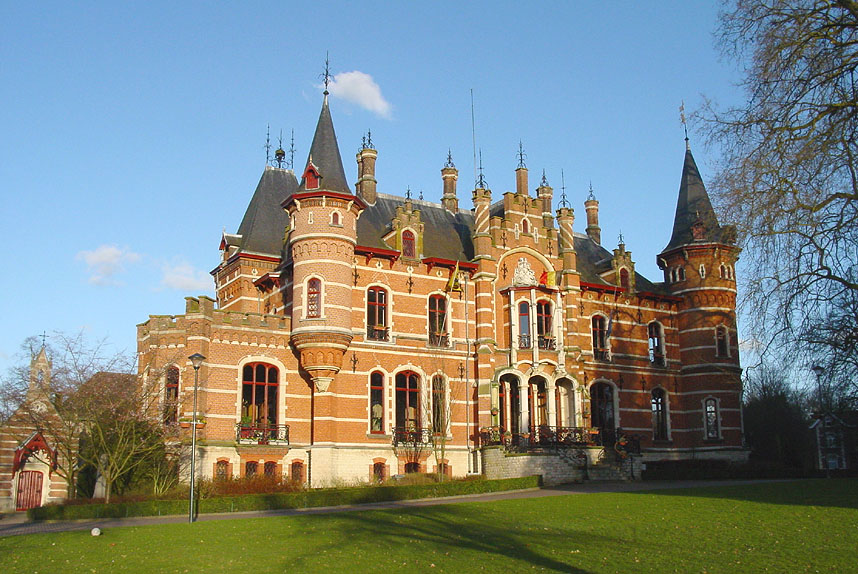
- Hoeilaart Town Hall

- Flag Coat of arms

- Location of Hoeilaart in Flemish Brabant
- Interactive map of Hoeilaart
- Location in Belgium
- Coordinates: 50°46′N 04°28′E
- Country: Belgium
- Community: Flemish Community
- Region: Flemish Region
- Province: Flemish Brabant
- Arrondissement: Halle-Vilvoorde

Government
  - Mayor: Tim Vandenput (Open VLD)
  - Governing parties: Open VLD, PRO Hoeilaart

Area
  - Total: 20.53 km^{2} (7.93 sq mi)

Population (2018-01-01)
  - Total: 11,172
  - Density: 544.2/km^{2} (1,409/sq mi)
- Postal codes: 1560
- NIS code: 23033
- Area codes: 02
- Website: www.hoeilaart.be

Hoeilaart (Dutch pronunciation: [ˈɦuilaːrt]) is a municipality in the province of Flemish Brabant, Belgium. The name Hoeilaart is of Gallic-Celtic origin, coming from "Ho-Lar," meaning a high clearing in the woods. Residents are called Hoeilanders or Doenders. The municipality only comprises the town of Hoeilaart proper. On January 1, 2019, Hoeilaart had a total population of 11,325. The total area is 20.43 km² which gives a population density of 493 inhabitants per km². Hoeilaart also sometimes called "The Glass Village" because of the greenhouse grape cultivation that once took place.

The official language is Dutch. Local minorities consist of nationals from many European Union countries, USA and Canada, and numerous French-speakers. 38.1% in 2004 according to the birth statistics of the ONEM agency. 41.6% speak Dutch; the rest speak foreign languages.

== Attractions ==
- Forest Museum Jan van Ruusbroec (in the Sonian Forest)
- Neo-Romanesque Church dating from 1870–1874
- Kasteel de Man (town hall)
- "Serristenvillas" from the 1920s
- Smeyberghoeve
- The old millhouse of the Groenendael Priory
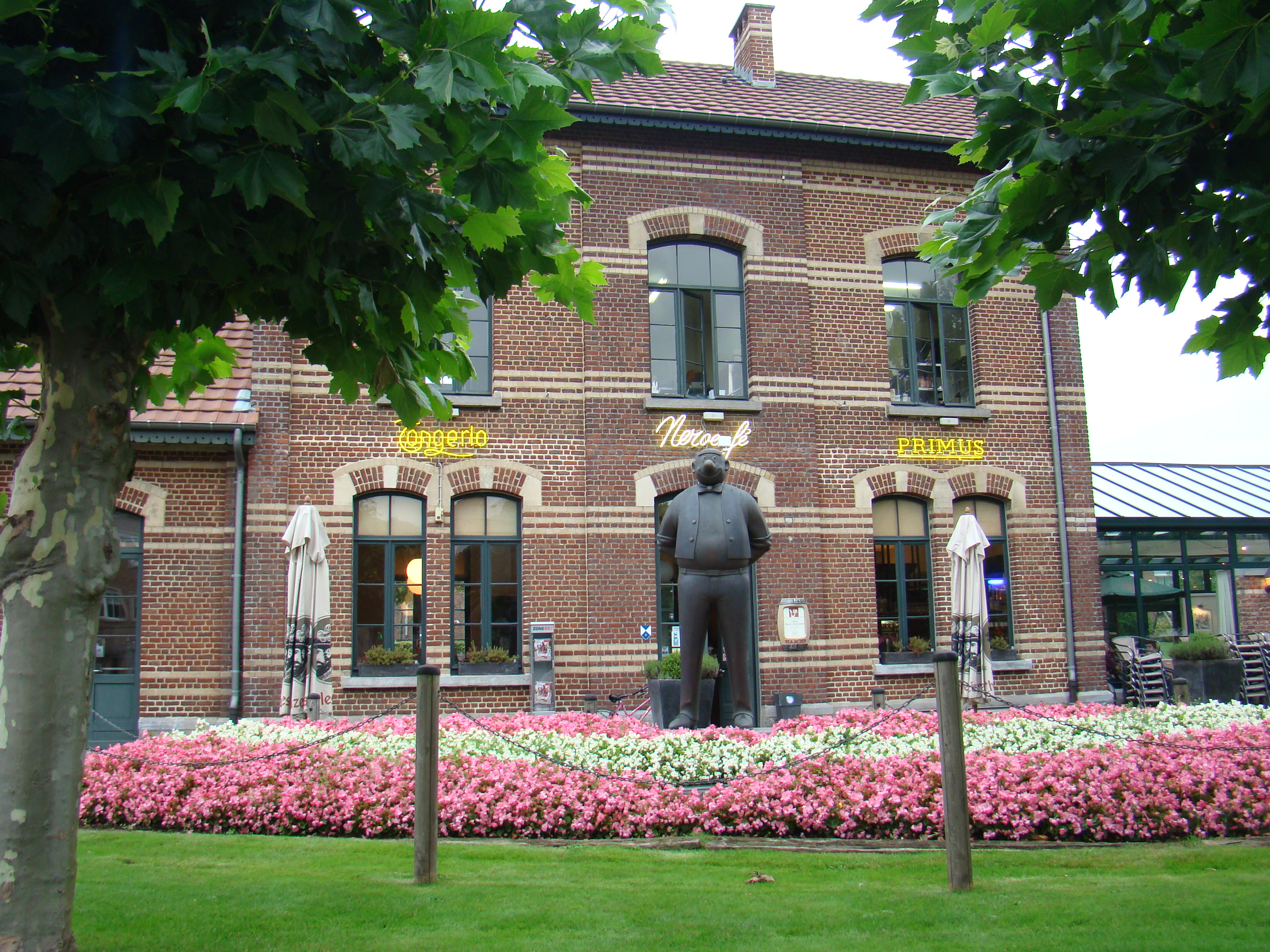
Old tram station of Hoeilaart with Nero statue

== Notable people ==
- Jan van Ruusbroec (1291–1381), one of the greatest mystics of the southern Netherlands.
- Armand Pien, weather forecaster on Flemish TV
- Marc Sleen, comics artist, author of Nero
- Jaak Pijpen, lawyer, politician
- Walter Baele
