= Off-model =

Quality of character drawn out of par with the original source material or model sheets

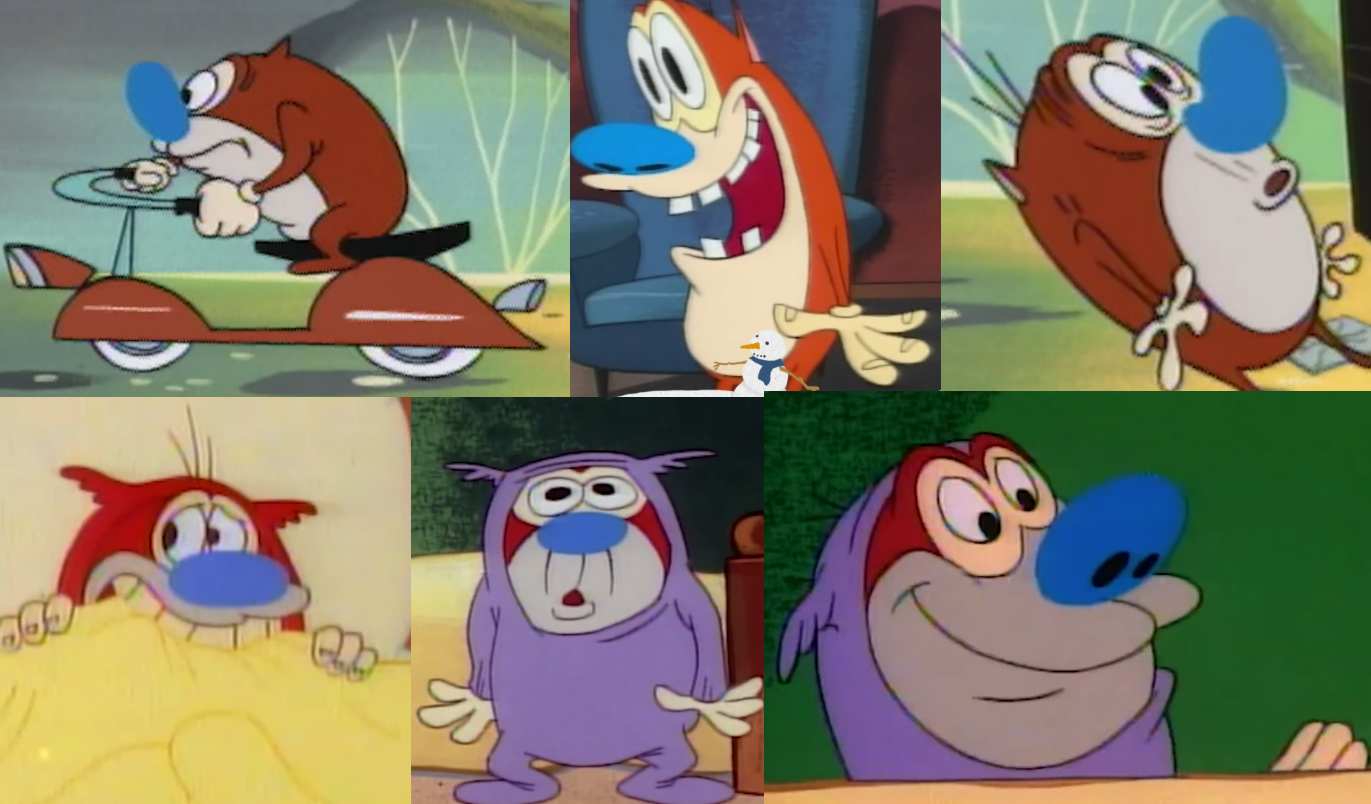
The emotions of Stimpy in The Ren & Stimpy Show are communicated by morphing his body and face's proportions in an intentional instance of off-model animation. Additionally, an accidental instance of off-model animation can be seen, as the bottom left image miscolours the purple pajamas Stimpy is wearing in the rest of the row to the red color of his fur.

Off-model is a term used in the animation and visual arts industries to describe art that does not match the style, design, or proportions that have been previously established for a given project (i.e. any work that is not on-model). Any kind of visual art can be off-model, so long as it defies the conventions of an established design. Consequently, art can be made off-model accidentally, due to skill or time constraints that may limit an artist's ability to accurately replicate a style. However, off-model can also be an intentional choice on the part of an animator. The Ren & Stimpy Show creator John Kricfalusi has argued that off-model animation allows originality and can help a scene come to life, as strictly sticking to poses and expressions as dictated in model sheets can be too restricting. Kevin Cooley similarly argues for the efficacy of off-model characters, analyzing how the series Steven Universe uses off-model animation as an expression of queerness.

Off-model art is often associated with 2D animation, such as cartoons and anime. For much of the history of 2D animation, individual frames have been hand-drawn in sequence. This task may be outsourced to multiple individuals or studios, increasing the chances for miscommunication of character, environment, or item design. Animation studios attempt to limit this issue by distributing model sheets amongst animators, which may include poses or expressions for artist reference.

Off-model work may also be the product of artists or cartoonists intending to parody another franchise but not wishing to incur a lawsuit or commit copyright infringement by drawing someone else's trademarked characters.

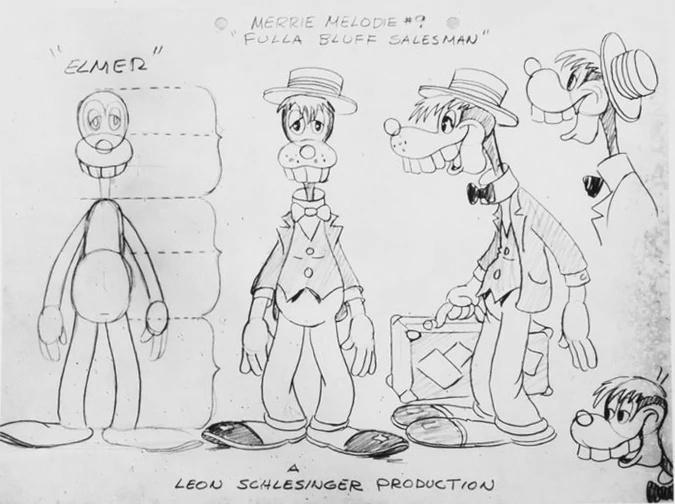
A model sheet used to achieve consistency within an animation.

== See also ==
- Uncanny valley
