= The Adventures of Nero =

Belgian comic strip (1947–2002)

- Adhemar, Nero, and Madam Pheip during the traditional waffle feast which concludes every story.
- Author: Marc Sleen
- Current status/schedule: Discontinued
- Launch date: October 1, 1947
- End date: 2002
- Syndicate(s): Uitgeverij Het Volk, Standaard Uitgeverij
- Genre(s): Humor comics, Satire, Fantasy, Adventure

The Adventures of Nero or Nero was a Belgian comic strip drawn by Marc Sleen and the name of its main character. The original title ranged from De Avonturen van Detectief Van Zwam in 1947 to De Avonturen van Nero en zijn Hoed in 1950, and finally De Avonturen van Nero & Co from 1951. It ran in continuous syndication until 2002. From 1947 until 1993 it was all drawn by Sleen himself. From 1992 until 2002 Dirk Stallaert took over the drawing while Sleen kept inventing the stories.

Together with Suske en Wiske and Jommeke, "Nero" is regarded as the Big Three of Flemish comics. The stories were noted for their satirical content, with references to politicians and celebrities of the day. With Nero, Marc Sleen holds the world record of issues of a comic book series title drawn by the same author. He drew The Adventures of Nero singlehandedly from 1947 to 1992 without any assistance from other artists. This feat is even more remarkable considering he also drew other comic strip series from 1947 to 1965.

From 1 January 2030, all comics series by Marc Sleen, including Nero, will enter public domain, in accordance with the Marc Sleen Foundation.

== History ==
The series debuted in the newspaper De Nieuwe Gids in the autumn of 1947 and was written and drawn by Marc Sleen from the start. Originally the central character was Detective Van Zwam, but early in the first story Het Geheim van Matsuoka ("The Secret of Matsuoka") (1947), Van Zwam meets a man who has drunk from a serum that makes people go insane and thinks he is the Roman emperor Nero. The character was also dressed in a toga with some laurel leaves behind his ears. Near the end of the story the character regained his senses and revealed his real name was "Schoonpaard" (in reprints this was changed to "Heiremans", in both cases inside joke references to colleagues of Sleen). "SchoonPaard" is probably a "typo", since in one of the first panels, "SchoonBaard" is one of the missing persons, and also the name of a colleague. The character proved popular and remained a friend of Van Zwam in the next stories, though everyone kept referring to him as "Nero" rather than by his real name. After nine stories, the series was renamed after "Nero" and Van Zwam became a side character instead.

In 1950 Sleen left De Nieuwe Gids and joined the newspaper Het Volk. During the 1940s, 1950s and 1960 The Adventures of Nero was popular enough to rival Willy Vandersteen's Suske en Wiske which was published in De Standaard. In 1965 Sleen joined De Standaard too, following a legal dispute with his publishers. The first 53 "Nero" stories, which were published in black-and-white, remained property of Uitgeverij Het Volk. From Het Bobobeeldje ("The Bobo Statue") (1965) on all new Nero stories were published in De Standaard and Het Nieuwsblad, after which they were released as colour albums.

Sleen continued drawing Nero for many decades. Only in 1992 did he finally hire an assistant, Dirk Stallaert, to do the drawing for him, because his eyesight had become too poor. Stallaert was promoted as Sleen's successor but in 2002 he decided to leave the series in favour of work at Vandersteen's studio. Sleen then terminated the series for good. Stallaert still draws "Nero"-related publicity images and merchandise.

The early stories had a random length, often around 240 strips, while the latter ones (from 1965 on) had a length of 32 pages of 4 strips each. Every day, two strips appeared in the newspaper.

== Concept ==
The Adventures of Nero is a humorous adventure comic strip about Nero, an unemployed man who describes himself as "newspaper appearance" and prefers reading his newspaper on his sofa. He and his wife, named "Madam Nero" ("Madam Nero") by everyone, have one son, Adhemar, who is a child prodigy. Nero has an eccentric group of friends, who often help him out or force him to set out on an adventure. Many stories display a love for nature and the animal world, which mirrors the creator's own frequent safari trips. Since the album Het Groene Vuur ("The Green Fire") (1965) nearly all "Nero" albums end with a traditional waffle feast, where Madam Nero and Madam Pheip bake waffles for the entire cast.

With two strips published a day, six days a week, the comic strip followed daily news events quite closely and often made references to real life news events. In the story De IJzeren Kolonel ("The Iron Colonel") (1956), for instance, the then-current Suez Crisis and Hungarian Uprising are incorporated into the plot. The series also had cameos by several Belgian and internationally famous politicians, such as Paul-Henri Spaak, Achiel Van Acker, Paul Vanden Boeynants, Wilfried Martens, Jean-Pierre Van Rossem, Jean-Luc Dehaene, Jozef Stalin, Mobutu, Gamal Abdel Nasser, Hirohito, Fidel Castro, Richard Nixon, Idi Amin, Khomeini, Margaret Thatcher and Saddam Hussein. Media celebrities, such as The Beatles, Pablo Escobar, Urbanus, Paul Newman and Frank Zappa were also frequently caricatured. Sleen also gave himself cameos in several stories. Very exceptional was that all these jokes about past politics were not removed when the newspaper episodes were published in album format. This is the major reason why "Nero" provides readers with an overview of almost 60 years of post-war history in Belgium.

Since Sleen worked without assistance for the majority of his career, he kept his drawing style simple and efficient. He had no time for elaborate detailed drawings and as a result many of his stories are filled to the brim with continuity errors or off-model drawing mistakes. Contrary to other comics, many readers accept this as part of "Nero"'s charm. Only when Dirk Stallaert took over the drawings did the art work become more technically detailed, with more attention towards space and perspective.

== Main characters ==
During its 55-year course, a lot of regular characters joined the original duo of Nero and Van Zwam.

- Nero is the main protagonist. Essentially good-hearted, he can also be a selfish, lazy man, who does not know how to keep his money and always gets himself into trouble. Nero is one of the very few anti-heroes to lead a comic strip.
- His wife (often called Madam Nero or, in some stories, Bea) stays mainly at home and tries to keep a semblance of a household while her husband is off to some far-flung corner of the Earth. If needs be, she knows how to defend herself.
- Detective Van Zwam is a private detective. Driving a Porsche 911 (which seems to crash at least once every comic), he is always at the scene of a crime extremely quickly, and can make the most brilliant deductions out of the smallest clues (often a cigarette stub).
- Adhemar is Nero's son. He is a child prodigy. He is only a few years old, but has received numerous Nobel prizes and Ph.D.s. His major hobby is building rockets, called Adhemar I, II, ... They also tend to crash somewhere in every story, but are a major means to get to the exotic countries where the stories often take place.
- Meneer Pheip is the bourgeois friend of Nero. In initial albums it appears he can only speak a broken, French-sounding kind of Flemish due to his French-speaking background. Later, he is portrayed as an old-fashioned Flemish nouveau riche, who thinks it is fitting that he speaks some poor kind of French instead of Dutch (a reference to the language battle between the Flemish and the French-speaking communities).
- Madam Pheip is his wife. She is a pipe-smoking bully, loyal to her kids, herself, her husband, and her friends (in that order). When necessary, she can make a smoke curtain with her pipe.
- Petatje is the adopted daughter of the Pheips. Her father and mother died when she was very young. Initially, she was adopted by Nero, but soon got to live with the Pheips. Her name, "Petatje", is a reference to the Flemish word for potato being "patat" (in dialect pronounced as "petat").
- Petoetje is their adopted son. He is actually the son of a Papuan king, and is extremely bright. Petoetje and Petatje are treated like children (which they are, around 10 years old) by their step-parents, even though they act more maturely most of the time.
- Clo-Clo is the younger son of the Pheips. His main characteristic is wearing a large moustache, despite being a toddler. He weeps for the smallest reason.
- Abraham Tuizentfloot is "the last pirate still alive", or so he believes. Armed with a dagger or sometimes a cannon, he is very easily irritated and chases everyone around. He can pop up in a story at any given time and it can never be predicted what he might do next. His name is a conflation of "duizendpoot" (jack of all trades) and "vloot" (fleet).
- Captain Oliepul is the captain of a tugboat named 'His Majesty's Pull'. He is a good friend of Nero, and has saved him many times. He's Marc Sleen's "deus ex machina": whenever characters seem to be drowning, at the very last moment captain Oliepul coincidentally passes by and saves them just in time.
- Jan Spier is an extremely strong man, who is said to be the last descendant of Jan Breydel. His last name means "muscle" in Dutch. He makes a living selling French fries or chips. He disappeared for many years in the middle part of the series, but readers convinced Sleen to let Jan Spier reappear. During the run of the series, he was married to at least two different women, Minoetje and Isabella. No divorce was ever mentioned or other explanation given.
- Officer Gaston was the last character to become a regular in the comic, and appeared very late, in 1995, twenty years after the birth of Clo-Clo (at that point the last regular to be added to the cast). Gaston is fat, not too bright, and at times incredibly incompetent. However, somehow he has managed to save Nero a few times.
- Jef Pedal is present from the first album, but soon fades away. He is an amateur pilot, and, though of slender build, often overcomes enemies by beating them with a hammer he invariably carries in an inner pocket.
- Nero's worst enemies are the Maltese (see: "De Spekschieter") bandit Ricardo and a devil called Geraard de Duivel ("Gerard the Devil", named after the medieval building, Geeraard de Duivelsteen, in Ghent).

== Popularity and influence ==
During its heyday Nero was the second most popular Flemish comic strip, after Suske en Wiske. The albums sold well, also because they were a lot cheaper than their main rival. From the late 1940s until the early 1960s all the stories were published on cheap paper and often smelt of fresh ink. During the 1960s Jef Nys' Jommeke overshadowed Nero's sales among children.

Attempts have been made to translate Nero to the Dutch, British, French, German and South African market. Except for in Wallonia and the Netherlands, the translated versions of Nero never caught on. Sleen has very rarely used his characters for merchandising or other commercializations.

Nero was very influential for the development of comics in Flanders. Its loose drawing style and story lines replete with folly were an inspiration for Urbanus, Biebel, Cowboy Henk, among others. Dutch artists like Martin Lodewijk (Agent 327) and René Windig and Eric De Jong ("Heinz") are also notable fans.

== In popular culture ==
The Flemish comics prize Bronzen Adhemar is named and sculpted after the character Adhemar. In Turnhout, where the award ceremony is traditionally held, a huge statue of Adhemar can be seen in the Warande park since June 15, 1991. It was created by Frank-Ivo Van Damme.

Several characters from the series also have their own statues. Nero has a bronze statue in Hoeilaart, sculpted by Luc Cauwenberghs, which was erected in 1994 in front of the old tram station. In the series this building is Nero's house since the story De Verschrikkelijke Tweeling ("The Horrible Twin") (1992). The station has been redecorated as a "Nero"-themed café. Nero has another statue in front of the casino in Middelkerke. Meneer Pheip has a statue in the Statiestraat in Moerbeke-Waas, the village of which he supposedly is the major. It was sculpted by Guy Du Cheyne on August 24, 2012. In the Dorpsstraat in Wuustwezel sculptor Gilbert Uitdenhouwen made a statue of Abraham Tuizentfloot, which was revealed in 2000.

The brass band "Nero-Harmonie" in Hoeilaart and a mountain bike route have been named after "Nero".

In 1984 composer Johan De Smet, conductor Vincent D'Hondt and director Arne Sierens chose upon the "Nero" story Het Rattenkasteel ("The Rats' Castle") (1947) for an opera adaptation. It premiered as Het Rattenkasteel.

The entire cast of the series was sculpted on a bas-relief in Sint-Niklaas, made by sculptor Paul Dekker in 1988 to commemorate Marc Sleen's appointment as an honorary citizen of the city.

In the Belgian Comic Strip Center in Brussels the permanent exhibition pays homage to the pioneers of Belgian comics, among them Marc Sleen. In the room dedicated to his work everything is designed to look like Nero's cosy home, complete with a tower of Belgian waffles and champagne nearby.

Nero is among the many Belgian comics characters to have, facetiously, a Brussels street named after them. The Rue de la Fourche/Greepstraat has a commemorative plaque with the name Rue Néron/Nerostraat placed under the actual street sign.

In 1995 a wall was dedicated to "Nero" at the Place Saint-Géry/Sint-Goriksplein in Brussels, where it is part of the Brussels' Comic Book Route. Between 1996 and 2011 Hasselt also had a wall. In 2014 a wall was dedicated to "Nero" in the Kloosterstraat in Antwerp, depicting a scene from the album "De Oliespuiter" ("The Oil Injector").

The Marc Sleen Museum in the Rue des Sables/Zandstraat in Brussels is dedicated to Sleen and his creations. It was opened in 2009. The museum organizes a special tourists' route in Brussels, based on several locations that appeared in "Nero" comic book albums, including the Black Tower, Palace of Justice, Chapel Church, Sablon/Zavel, Central Station, Grand-Place/Grote Markt and Manneken Pis. One has to make an appointment, though.

Nero, the dog of the character Carmen Waterslaeghers in the successful Flemish TV sitcom FC De Kampioenen, was named after Nero. In one of the episodes Carmen is thinking of a name for her dog and coincidentally sees the daily "Nero" comic in the newspaper.

== Sources ==
- Nero dossier European Comics on the Web
