= Nero (comic book character) =

Character in Belgian comic strip (1947–2002)

Publication information
- Publisher: Standaard Uitgeverij (Belgium)
- First appearance: The Adventures of Nero: Het Geheim van Matsuoka (1947).
- Created by: Marc Sleen

In-story information
- Abilities: Immortality

Nero is a Flemish comic book character and the main protagonist in Marc Sleen's long running comic book strip series The Adventures of Nero (1947–2002). He is one of the most recognizable comic book characters in Belgium and comparable to Lambik from the Suske en Wiske series by Willy Vandersteen.

Nero is a middle aged, fairly obese man who is bald except for two long hairs on his head. Furthermore, he wears a huge red bow tie and has laurel leaves behind his ears, in reference to the Roman emperor Nero after whom he was named.

Nero is an anti hero. He is a complex character with many good character traits, but also many human frailties. He is sometimes stupid, lazy, naïve, egotistical and vain, but in other situations he proves himself to be clever, friendly, determined and melancholic.

== Origin ==
When Marc Sleen started a comic strip series in 1947 for De Nieuwe Gids Detective Van Zwam was originally the central character, therefore naming the series after him. In the very first story, "Het Geheim van Matsuoka" ("Matsuoka's Secret") (1947) Nero made his debut. Van Zwam meets him while trying to solve a case, yet Nero is still named "Schoonpaard" (in reprints "Heiremans", after a colleague of Sleen at his office) here. Because he drank the insanity poison, Matsuoka beer, Schoonpaard thinks he is the Roman emperor Nero. At the end of the story he gets his senses back. Still, in all other albums everyone, including himself, refers to him as "Nero".

Nero became the breakout character of the series. Readers wrote to Sleen that they felt Nero was more sympathetic than Van Zwam and thus, from the ninth album "De Hoed van Geeraard de Duivel" ("The Hat of Gerard the Devil") (1960) on, the series was named after him and Nero became the central protagonist.

== Character ==
Originally Nero was presented as a dumb character, but in later stories he gained some intelligence. Still he remains impulsive, egotistical, proud, lazy, stubborn, self-important, naïve, clumsy, headstrong, vain and aggressive. Whenever he finds money or treasure his initial reaction is to keep everything to himself. He can show his good heart too. He fights against injustice and for peace. He helps people in need and gets angry whenever his friends are threatened by bandits.

Nero is unemployed, though he frequently claims his job is "newspaper appearance", referring to the fact that he was published in newspaper comic strips. His favorite pastime is reading his newspaper on the couch. Usually he doesn't want to go on adventure and views work as horror. In some albums he appears to be rather poor and is forced to look for a job. Still Nero managed to find several treasures, inherit fortunes or win the lottery over the years. On such occasions he dresses in high hat, smokes big cigars, drinks champagne and drives around in big limousines. He has travelled the globe in many albums and even visited other planets. Nero lived in many different homes and even castles over the course of the series, but from "De Gelukbrenger" ("The Luck Bringer") (1988) until "De Verschrikkelijke Tweeling" ("The Horrible Twin") (1990) on he and his wife lived in the same house on a mountain for a couple of albums, named the Louteringsberg. A bomb attack destroyed both the mountain and the house and thus they moved to Hoeilaart, where Nero lived until his final story.

Compared to his genius son, Adhemar, Nero often feels inferior. He is rather simple minded himself. He still believes in Sinterklaas and is the only adult who still writes him a letter every year. Nero also believes in Neptune, mermaids and gnomes In some stories he prays in emergency situations or promises he'll join a monastery. In "Joske the Wreker" ("Joske the Avenger") (1986) Adhemar sighs that Nero "prefers Jean-Marie Pfaff above Albert Einstein". He also easily takes confidence in all kinds of bizarre and suspicious fortune tellers and tricksters.

Nero managed to gain access to several high political offices. He was a maharadja, almost president of the US, sheriff, prime minister of Rachepour, prime minister of Mesopotamia. He also met various celebrities, like Joseph Stalin, Fidel Castro and Idi Amin Dada In "De Bibberballon" ("The Shiver Balloon") (1990) Nero dropped a frigo box on Saddam Hussein's head and in "De Gouden Hemelkijker" ("The Golden Heavenstarer") (1991) he also kicked him in his behind.

Despite not looking that sporty, Nero is able to demonstrate strength. He beat boxer Joe Louis in "De Erfenis van Nero" ("The Heritage of Nero") (1948) and became heavy weight champion again in "De Negen Peperbollen" ("The Nine Pepperballs") (1956). He was a professional soccer player for a while and won the world championship of 1962. All these feats were possible with the help of certain potions, but even without them Nero is still able to win fights with his bare fists He also crossed many oceans by swimming.

In "Kangoeroe Eiland" ("Kangaroo Isle") (1961) he published 11 books and made many inventions. He also frequently donated animals he encountered on his voyages to the Antwerp Zoo. In "De "Z" van Zottebie" ("The "Z" of Zottebie") (1989) he becomes a painter, but his "art" is only used to cover up a smuggling affair. In "De Bibberballon" ("The Shivering Balloon") (1990) he types his memoires, but is unable to finish them.

Nero is a fan of pop music and Sylvie Vartan. In "Nerorock" (1989) he becomes a rock star.

== Physical characteristics ==
Nero was bald until "De Man Met Het Gouden Hoofd" ("The Man with the Golden Head") (1948). In this story he drinks from a river in Alaska, which causes his characteristical two single long hairs to grow. In "De X-Bom" ("The X-Bomb") (1955) and "De Gladde Figaro" ("The Sly Figaro") (1991–1992) he uses a hair growing medicin, but uses so much that his hair keeps growing forever.

Nero is immortal. In "De Bronnen van Sing Song Li" ("The Sources of Sing Song Li") (1951) he drinks an elixir which gives him eternal life. In "De Wallabieten" (1968) he drinks a pill which makes people 1.000-year-old and in "De Nerobloemen" ("The Nero Flowers") (1978) he drinks another elixir that gives him eternal life. A wizard in "Zongo in de Kongo" ("Zongo in the Kongo") (1970) gives him immortality as well. Still many fortune tellers predict his death and in "De Ring van Petatje" ("Petatje's Ring"), "De Dood van Pietje" ("Pietje's Death") (1986–1987) and "Zilveren Tranen" ("Silver Tears") (2002) the Grim Reaper tries to kill him. Geeraard the Devil also tries to get Nero's soul.

== Youth ==
In "De Zwarte Voeten" ("The Black Feet") (1951) Nero claims that his mother was from Brussels and his father a Pole. Since he's drunk when saying this it's not clear whether he is being serious. According to "De Juwelen van Gaga-Pan" ("The Jewels of Gaga-Pan") (1949–1950) his second name is "Baddevinus" and his astrological sign capricornus, just like his creator Marc Sleen. In "Het Rattenkasteel" ("The Rat Castle") (1948) and "Het Wonderwolkje" ("The Miracle Cloud") (1960) Nero is revealed to have been a Boy Scout in his youth. In "De Erfenis van Nero" ("Nero's Heritage") (1948) we see a portrait of Nero from the year 1920, when he still had curly hair. Albums like "De V-Machine" ("The V-Machine") (1979) and "IJskoud Geblaas" ("Ice Cold Blowing") (1995) also confirm he used to be slim and curly haired as a youth. In the latter story he also learn how he and Madam Nero became a couple, which is a wink to the way Sleen met his first wife. Nero went to school until he was 22.

Nero is married. His wife is called Madam Nero by everyone; in the early albums she is scarcely present or visible, except to tell Nero to wash up the dishes. In "Het Geheim van Matsuoka" ("The Secret of Matsuoka") (1947) Nero has a son and a daughter. They were changed into nephews in reprints. In "Het Rattenkasteel" ("The Rat's Castle") (1948) Nero has a baby son, but none of these three infants are ever seen or referenced again in the series. Since "De Zoon van Nero" ("Nero's Son") (1959) Nero has one son, the child prodigy Adhemar.

We only know a few of Nero's family members. In "De Erfenis van Nero" ("Nero's Heritage") (1948–1949) his uncle passes away and leaves him 80 million Belgian franks. In "De Ark van Nero" ("Nero's Arc") (1952–1953) we learn he had a grandfather who made several predictions which came true. In "Het Knalgele Koffertje" ("The Bright Yellow Case") (1958–1959) Nonkel Juul appears, head of the biggest diamond mine of Transvaal. In "De Adhemarbonbons" ("The Adhemar Pralines") (1989) Nero's grandmother turns up and in "Bompanero" (1997) his grandfather. Whether this grandfather is the same character appearing in "De Ark van Nero" ("Nero's Arc") is not made clear.

== Status ==
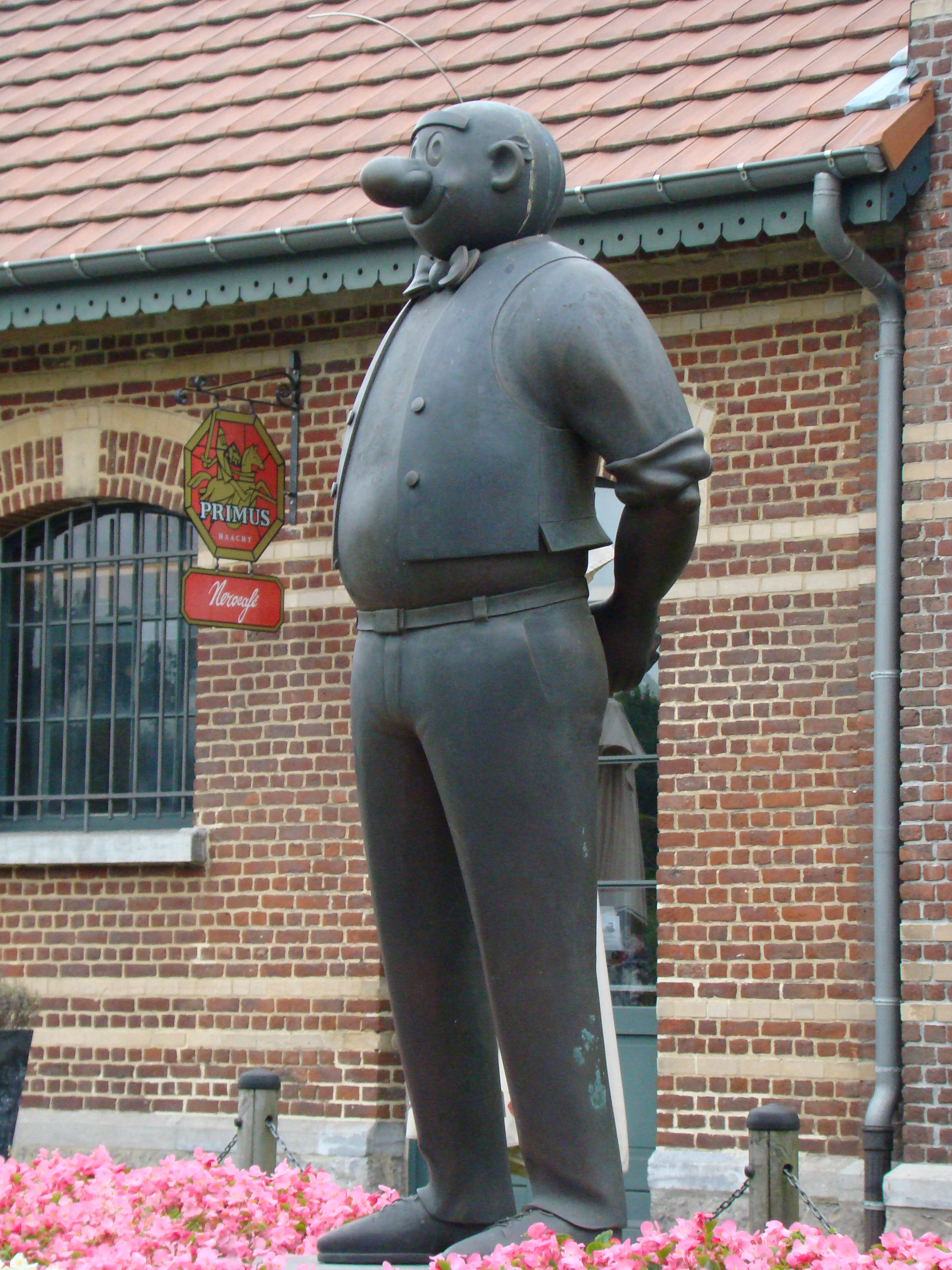
Statue of Nero in Hoeilaart, hometown of Marc Sleen and Nero

As one of the most famous comic book characters in Flanders Nero received his own statue in Hoeilaart, near an old streetcar station in 1994. It was originally made in polyester, but changed to bronze in 2004. The sculptor is Luc Cauwenberghs. The location was chosen because Nero himself moved into this house in the album "De Verschrikkelijke Tweeling" ("The Horrible Twin") (1990). Today the place is a café, named after Nero.

There is another statue of Nero in front of the casino in Middelkerke, where other statues of Belgian comic book characters can be seen.

The organisation "Nero-Harmonie" in Hoeilaart and a mountain bike route have been named after him.

Nero, the dog of Carmen Waterslaeghers in the popular Flemish sitcom FC De Kampioenen was also named after the comic book character, when Carmen happened to see a newspaper with Nero in it.

He is included along with other Nero characters on a bas-relief in Sint-Niklaas, made by sculptor Paul Dekker in 1988 to commemorate Marc Sleen's induction as an honorary citizen of the city. A wall on the Place Saint-Géry/Sint-Goriksplein was dedicated to Nero in 1995 and can be visited during the Brussels' Comic Book Route. A similar wall was also revealed in the Kloosterstraat in Antwerp in 2014 depicting Nero, Petoetje and Petatje.

In the 1984 opera Het Rattenkasteel Nero's role was played by Marc van Malderen.

To honor the 200th "Nero" album a special puppet theatre play was performed in the "Poesje" van St. Andries, next to the St. Andries kerk in Antwerp, with a special puppet made after Nero.
