= Marc Sleen =

Belgian cartoonist (1922–2016)

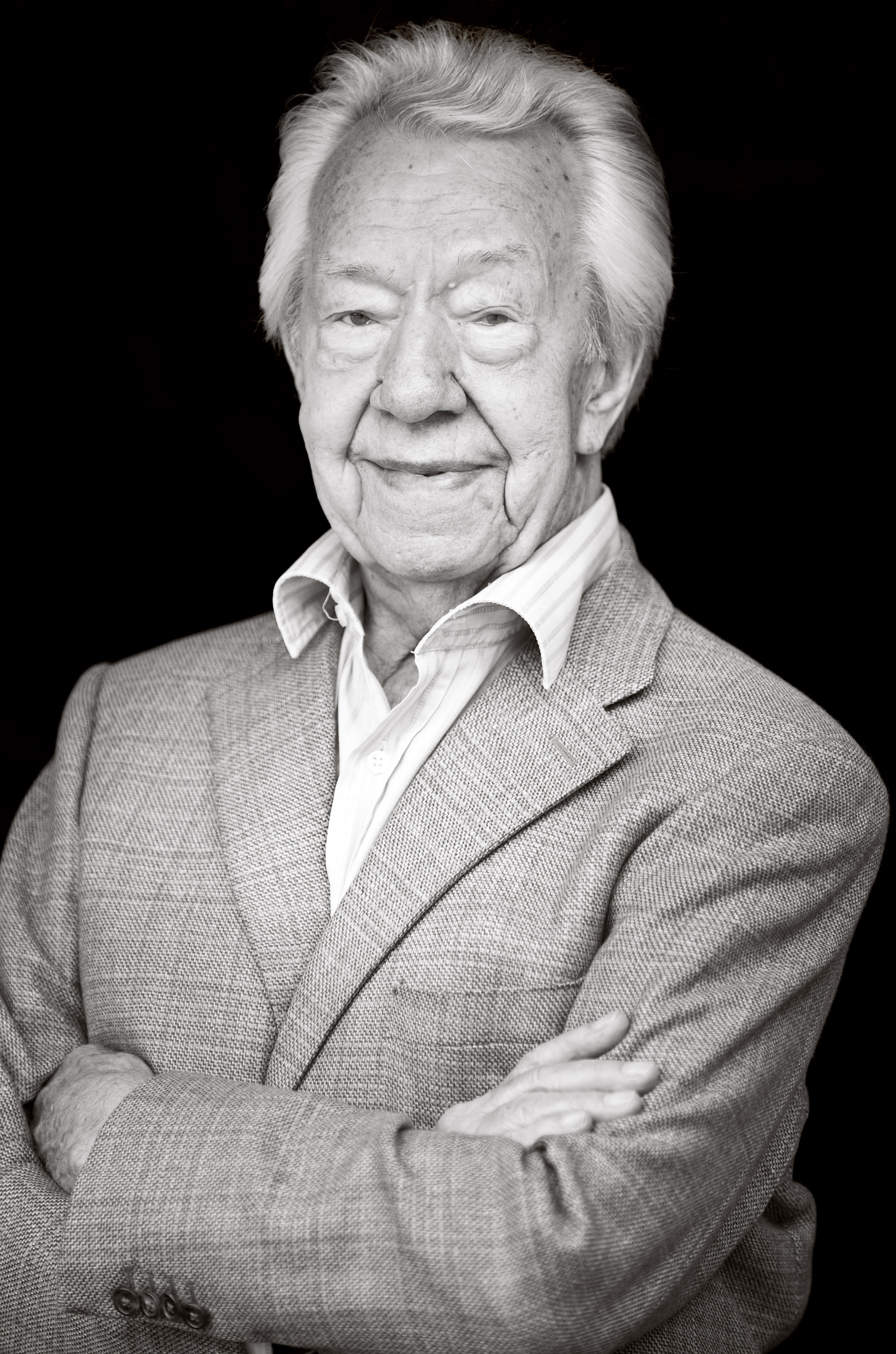
- Sleen in 2012
- Born: Marcel Neels; 30 December 1922 Gentbrugge, East Flanders, Belgium
- Died: 6 November 2016 (aged 93) Hoeilaart, Flemish Brabant, Belgium
- Areas: Artist, writer
- Pseudonym: Marc Sleen
- Notable works: Nero; De Lustige Kapoentjes; Piet Fluwijn en Bolleke; Oktaaf Keunink; Doris Dobbel; De Ronde van Frankrijk
- Awards: Full list

Marcel Honoree Nestor (ridder) Neels (30 December 1922 – 6 November 2016), known as Marc Sleen, was a Belgian comics artist. He was mostly known for his humorous adventure comic The Adventures of Nero and Co., but also created gag comics like Piet Fluwijn en Bolleke, De Lustige Kapoentjes, Doris Dobbel, Oktaaf Keunink and De Ronde van Frankrijk.

Sleen was one of the most celebrated comics artists in his home country. His work is admired for its absurd and sometimes satirical comedy, as well for the fact that he worked completely singlehandedly without any assistance for 45 years on end, a feat that landed him a spot in The Guinness Book of Records in 1992. (This feat has been surpassed since by Jim Russell's The Potts, which ran for 62 years.) He was one of the few comics artists in Belgium who had a museum dedicated to his work.

== Biography ==
Marc Sleen was born as Marcel Neels in Gentbrugge, near Ghent. He studied drawing in Ghent. During the Second World War he was imprisoned by Nazi soldiers in Fort Breendonk because his brother worked for the resistance. He was tortured and put in the death cell, but saved by the fact that after D-Day the officers moved all the prisoners to a different prison, where he could escape. In 1944 he started to work as a political caricaturist in the Flemish newspaper De Standaard. He also contributed illustrations and short comics for the newspaper and the youth supplement, and made illustrations and his first comics for the magazine Ons Volk. He was also a courtroom sketch artist for a while.

In October 1947, Marc Sleen started a new series, The adventures of detective Van Zwam in the newspaper De Nieuwe Gids. In the first adventure Detective Van Zwam encounters a fool who thinks he is emperor Nero. After he regains his senses, they continue calling him Nero and slowly he became the star of the series. The name changes accordingly to The adventures of detective Van Zwam and Nero and after nine stories to The adventures of Nero and co.

The series appeared for 55 years with a rhythm of two strips every day. This was typical for the Flemish comic tradition, as with Suske en Wiske (Spike and Suzy). Nero became well known for its ironic humour and references to current affairs. For instance, in the album, Het Vredesoffensief Van Nero ("Nero's Peace Offensive") (1951), Nero visits Joseph Stalin to make him drink an elixir that will make him a pacifist.

Besides Nero Sleen drew several other comic strip series, many of them gag-a-day comics, for magazines like 't Kapoentje and Ons Volkske. Among the most well known were Piet Fluwijn en Bolleke (1947–1965), Doris Dobbel (1950–1965), Oktaaf Keunink (1952–1965) and De Lustige Kapoentjes. Sleen also drew a daily cartoon during the Tour de France from 1947 until 1965, called De Ronde van Frankrijk.

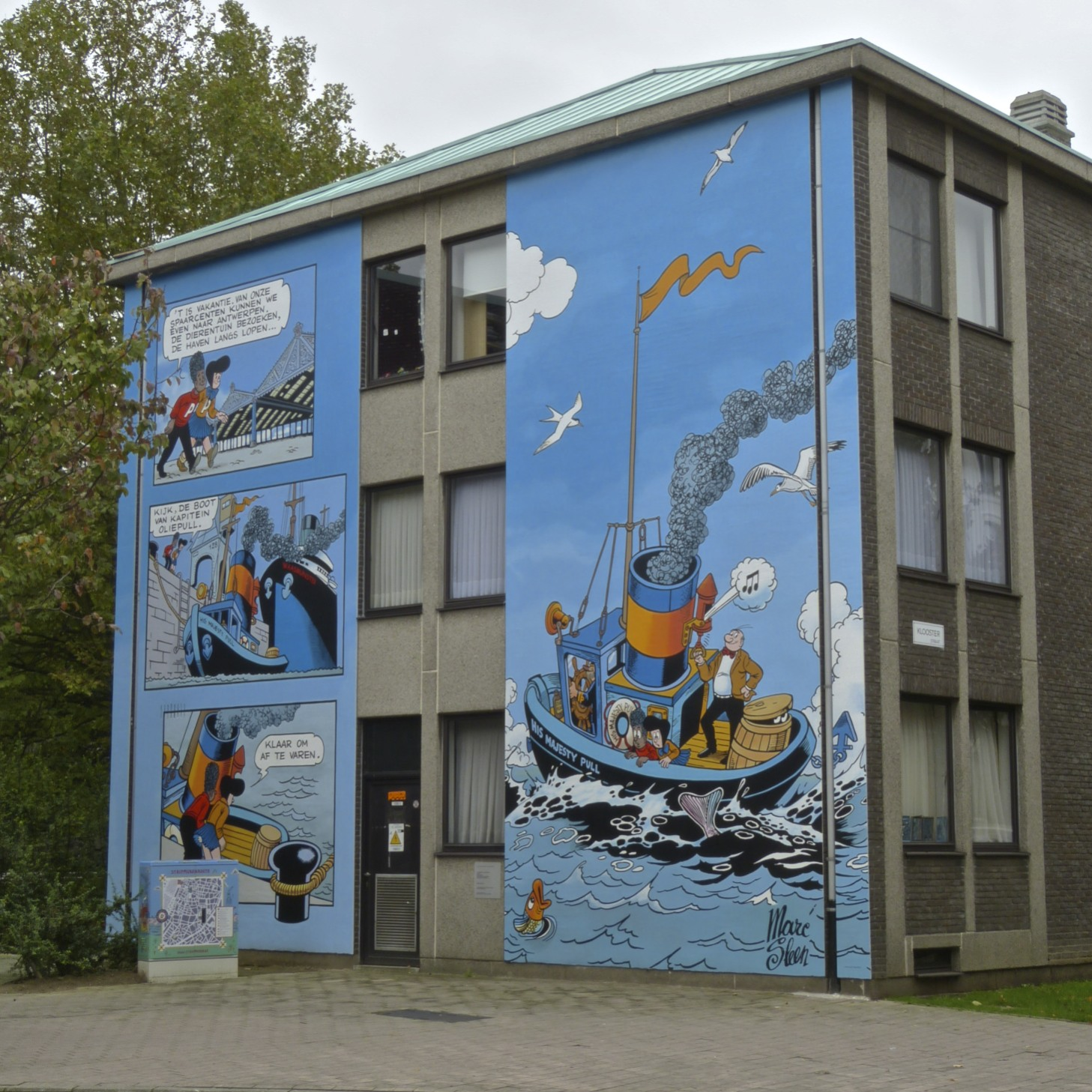
Wall painting in Antwerp showing the main characters of Nero

Between 1950 and 1965 Sleen published Nero in Het Volk, after which he moved to De Standaard. This caused a huge copyright controversy, as several newspapers fought over the rights over his syndicated comics. Thousands of readers switched from Het Volk to De Standaard, just to follow his adventures in the newspaper. After that switch, he dropped all other series and devoted himself solely to Nero.

From 1992 to 2002, he was aided by Dirk Stallaert, a versatile Flemish comic artist, and at first the intention was to let Stallaert continue the series after Marc Sleen retired. But in the end, Stallaert didn't feel ready to continue it alone, and at the end of 2002, at the age of 80, Marc Sleen ended his career as a comics artist.

Sleen designed album covers for records by Flemish actor, comedian and singer Jef Burm. Burm was a former school mate of his.

== TV documentary work ==
Marc Sleen was also known as a traveller and animal friend. He made 35 safaris to Africa between 1961 and 1991, making more than 20 documentaries for the Vlaamse Radio- en Televisieomroep, mostly for the TV show "Allemaal Beestjes". A few books and records about his safaris appeared as well. Many of his comics featured animals and countries he has visited.

== Legacy ==
Marc Sleen is commonly considered one of the big names of the Flemish comics, together with Willy Vandersteen and Jef Nys.

In 2005 he was selected as one of the 111 nominees for the title "The Greatest Belgian" (De Grootste Belg) in the Flemish edition. He ended in 48th place.

On 19 June 2009, a museum dedicated to his life and career was opened in Brussels: the Marc Sleen Museum. Both Marc Sleen as well as King Albert II of Belgium were present. The king was a fan of Nero since his youth and both he and Baudouin of Belgium learned Dutch by reading "Nero".

Sleen died at the age of 93 on the evening of 6 November 2016. He was buried in the Campo Santo in Ghent.

On 1 January 2030, all comic characters by Marc Sleen will officially enter public domain.

== Awards ==
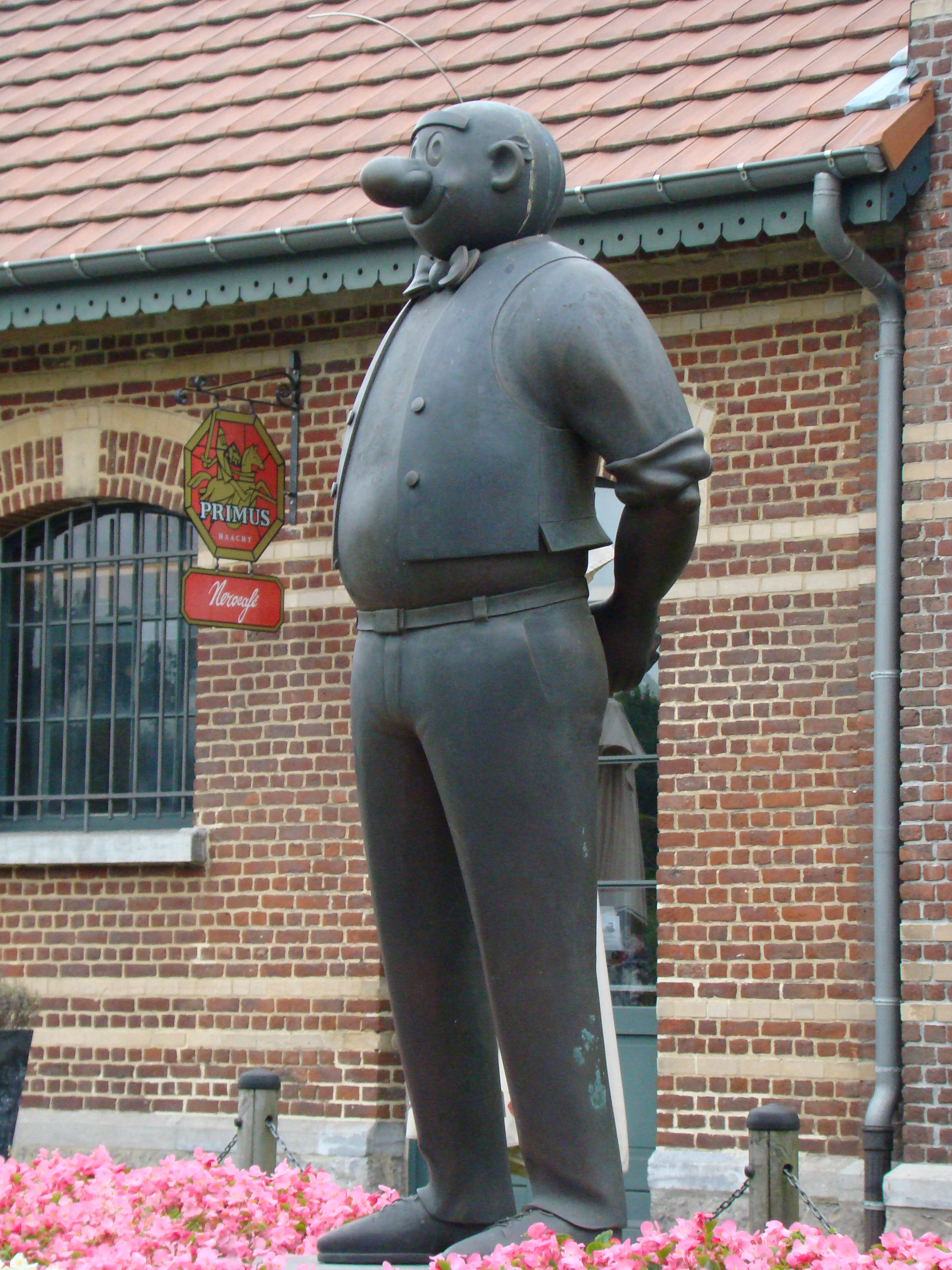
Statue of Nero in Hoeilaart. It was specifically placed in front of the old train station (nowadays a bar), because this is Nero's home in the series since the album De Verschrikkelijke Tweeling (The Horrible Twin (1990)). Sleen also lived in Hoeilaart.

- 1974: Prix Saint-Michel for best comical story, Brussels, Belgium. The award went to Het Lachvirus (The Laughing Virus).
- 1981: Honorary citizen of Hulshout, Belgium
- 1984: Honorary citizen of Sint-Niklaas, Belgium
- 1989: Stamp of Nero issued by the Belgian Post.
- 1993: Gouden Adhemar at Strip Turnhout, Belgium
- 1995: Best comic of 1994 by the "Belgische Kamer van stripexperten" (Belgian assembly of comic experts)
- 1997: Knighted (Ridder) by king Albert II of Belgium
- 2005: Honorary citizen of Brussels
- 2008: Honorary citizen of Turnhout
- 2011: Honorary citizen of Hoeilaart

Statues of his creations have been erected in Turnhout (1991), Hoeilaart (1994) and Middelkerke (1997). An exclusive museum opposite the Belgian Centre for Comic Strip Art is devoted to his work.

== Major comics series ==
His comics were drawn rapidly in a "flexible and loose" style. They can be divided in one-page or one-strip gag series like Piet Fluwijn en Bolleke and De Lustige Kapoentjes, and humorous adventure comics of book length (generally between 32 and 64 pages) like Stropke en Flopke and Nero.

- Piet Fluwijn (1944–1945)
- Piet Fluwijn en Bolleke (1945–1965) (also known as The adventures of a father and his son)
- Pollopof (1946–1952)
- Stropke en Flopke (1946–1950)
- Nero (1947–2002)
- De Ronde van Frankrijk ("the annual Tour de France". (Each year Marc Sleen drew a daily strip about the cycling event) (1947–1964)
- De Lustige Kapoentjes (1950–1965) (continued by other artists including Hurey and Kabou)
- Doris Dobbel (1950–1967)
- Fonske (1951–1960)
- Oktaaf Keunink (1952–1965)
