= Suske en Wiske Weekblad =

Belgian comics magazine

- Suske en Wiske Weekblad No. 1 (15 September 1993); Front cover by Studio Vandersteen.

Publication information
- Publisher: Standaard Uitgeverij
- Schedule: Weekly
- Publication date: 1993–2003 (disestablished)
- Main character(s): Suske en Wiske

Suske en Wiske Weekblad was a Belgian comics magazine which debuted on September 15, 1993 and ran in weekly syndication until December 24, 2003. It was based on the popularity of Suske en Wiske and notable for being the last attempt in Flanders to release a new comic book magazine.

== History ==
Every new issue was published on Wednesdays. The magazine mostly published prepublications of comics distributed by Standaard Uitgeverij, such as Suske en Wiske and other comics of Studio Vandersteen. But it also provided a place for Dutch comics and translations of British, American, Walloon and French comic strip series. Some comics were reprints of older series, such as Boule et Bill. Apart from comics the magazine also featured games, posters, interviews, articles, mini-comics and contests.

Thanks to the popularity of Suske en Wiske in Flanders and the Netherlands the magazine sold well. The first issue was a free gift with the 237th Suske en Wiske album De Snikkende Sirene (1993). Still, after a decade of publishing, the magazine was discontinued.

== Incomplete list of notable series published in the magazine ==
- Bakelandt – Hec Leemans
- Benoit Brisefer – Peyo
- Bessy (comics) – Studio Vandersteen
- Biebel – Marc Legendre
- Dik Van Dieren – Gleever
- F.C. De Kampioenen – Hec Leemans
- Jerom – Studio Vandersteen
- De Kiekeboes – Merho
- The Adventures of Nero – Marc Sleen
- Oktoknopie – Gleever
- Roboboy – Luc Cromheecke, Willy Linthout
- De Rode Ridder – Studio Vandersteen
- Sam – Jan Bosschaert, Marc Legendre
- Sarah en Robin – Steven Dupré
- Schanulleke – Studio Vandersteen
- The Smurfs – Peyo
- Suske en Wiske – Studio Vandersteen
- Urbanus – Willy Linthout, Urbanus
