= Willy Linthout =

Belgian comics author

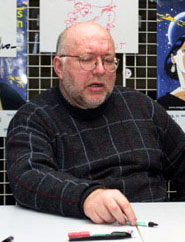
Willy Linthout

Willy Linthout (born 1 May 1953) is a Belgian comics author, best known for the Urbanus comics and his graphic novel Years of the Elephant.

== Biography ==
Willy Linthout was born in Eksaarde near Lokeren, Belgium in 1953. He was a mechanic and a comics collector when he made his first comic book. Linthout had the idea of creating a comic strip whose main character would be based on the comedian Urbanus. Through publisher Jef Meert, a meeting at Urbanus' house was arranged. The comedian liked Linthout's idea, as well as the drawings. Linthout made the first two albums of Urbanus alone. The first album, which appeared in 1983, sold 50,000 copies right away, and Urbanus became one of the most popular Flemish comic strips. So far, 135 albums have appeared. The series is noted for its black comedy and satire.

Linthout also collaborates on the popular Kiekeboe comic strip of Merho, and has created together with Luc Cromheecke the series Roboboy.

In 2007, after the suicide of his son, he wrote and drew the graphic novel Jaren van de Olifant (Years of the Elephant), which was nominated for a number of international awards and won the Bronzen Adhemar, the most important Flemish comics award.

== Bibliography ==
- Urbanus: 1983–present, 135 volumes, Standaard Uitgeverij, written by Urbanus and Linthout
- Roboboy: 2003–present, 6 volumes, Dupuis and Catullus, art by Luc Cromheecke
- Years of the Elephant, 2007, Bries (in 8 small volumes) and Meulenhoff/Manteau (in 1 184 page volume): published in English by Ponent Mon S.L.
- Het Laatste Station, 2008, 3 volumes, Standaard Uitgeverij, art by Erik Wielaert

== Awards ==
- 2007: nominated for the Stripschapprijs Album of the Year (Dutch, literary) for The Year of the Elephant part 1
- 2008: nominated for the Prix Saint-Michel for best Dutch language comic
- 2009: Bronzen Adhemar for The Year of the Elephant
- 2010: nominated for the Eisner Awards for Best U.S. Edition of International Material and Best Writer/Artist-Nonfiction
- 2010: nominated for the Award for Best Dutch Language Youth Comic at the Stripschapprizes for Roboboy 6
- 2010: nominated for the Award for Best Dutch Language Comic at the Prix Saint-Michel for The Year of the Elephant
