= Bronzen Adhemar =

Official Flemish Community cultural prize for comics

The Bronzen Adhemar (Dutch for "Bronze Adhemar") is the official Flemish Community Cultural Prize for Comics, given to a Flemish comics author for his body of work. It is awarded by the Flemish Ministry of Culture during Strip Turnhout, the major Flemish comics festival, once every two years.

== History ==
Continuing the idea of a comics award given once in 1972, the prize was definitely installed by the makers of the magazine Ciso in 1977, "to emphasize and enhance the quality of Flemish comics". From 1979 on, the winner also got an exposition during the festival in Turnhout. The prize then changed from yearly to two-yearly.

The organisation of the Award was transferred to the "Bronzen Adhemar Stichting" in 1991, and again to the Flemish Community in 2003, when a monetary prize of 12,500 Euro was added to the statue all winners received.

== The name ==
The "Bronzen Adhemar" (Brass Adhemar) is named after Adhemar, the son of Nero, one of the classic Flemish comics. Twice, a "Gouden Adhemar" (Golden Adhemar) was awarded on special occasions.

== Winners ==
- 1972: Ciso-Award for Bob De Moor
- 1977: Hec Leemans and Daniel Janssen for Bakelandt
- 1978: Kamagurka for Bert
- 1979: Karel Biddeloo for De Rode Ridder
- 1981: Jean-Pol for Kramikske
- 1983: Merho for Kiekeboe
- 1985: Berck for Sammy and Lowietje
- 1987: Erika Raven for Thomas Rindt
- 1989: Johan De Moor for Kasper
- 1991: Jan Bosschaert for Sam and Omni
- 1993: Eric Joris for Chelsey
  - Gouden Adhemar: Marc Sleen
- 1995: Dirk Stallaert for Nino and Nero
- 1997: Ferry for De kronieken van Panchrysia (The chronicles of Panchrysia)
- 1999: Erik Meynen for De jaren van Dehaene (The years of Dehaene)
- 2001: Marvano for The Forever War and Dallas Barr
- 2003: Dick Matena for De Avonden (The evenings). Matena is Dutch but lives in Belgium since the mid-1980s.
- 2005: William Vance for XIII and Bob Morane
  - Gouden Adhemar: Jef Nys
- 2007: Kim Duchâteau
  - also nominated: Luc Cromheecke, and Simon Spruyt, and Fritz Van den Heuvel
- 2009: Willy Linthout for Het Jaar van de Olifant
- 2011: Steven Dupré for Sarah en Robin
- 2013: Marc Legendre for Biebel
- 2015: Luc Cromheecke for Plunk
- 2018: Jeroen Janssen
- 2020: Charel Cambré
- 2022: Judith Vanistendael
- 2024: Brecht Evens
- 2026: Olivier Schrauwen
