= Jan Bosschaert =

Belgian comics artist, painter and illustrator

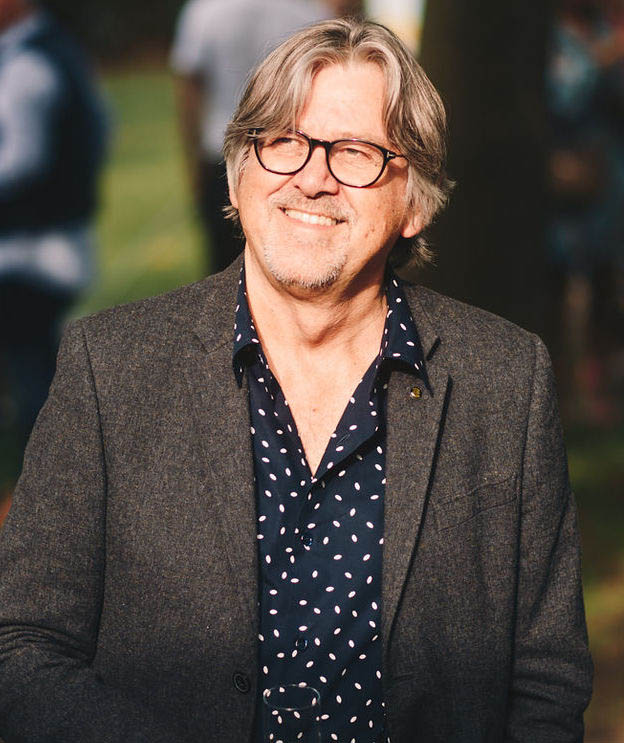
- Born: 15 December 1957 (age 68)
- Occupations: comics artist, painter, illustrator

Jan Bosschaert (born 15 December 1957) is a Belgian comics artist, painter and illustrator, best known for the humorous adventure comic series Sam and Jaguar, and his illustrations for the books of Marc De Bel.

== Biography ==
Jan Bosschaert was born in Borgerhout in Flanders in 1957. He was raised in Wijnegem, close to the forest, in a house with a large garden. He spent most of his free time drawing. He made his first comic when he was about 10, and continued in the next years with comics in different genres, ranging from Sherlock Holmes stories to his own version of Lucky Luke. One of his comics, about two senior scouts, he shows to established comics creator Eddy Ryssack, whose main advice is to make sure everything is well documented. He also loved the work of André Franquin which he discovered at the age of 14 at a comics fair in Brussels.

His puberty was a rather unhappy period, where Bosschaert withdrew into his own world and into music. He listened to artists like Tom Waits or Jackson Browne, but kept on drawing. When he was 18 years old, he visited comics author Pom. Seeing the poverty the author lived in was quite a shock, but it didn't stop him of becoming an artist himself.

When he studied at the Sint-Lukasinstituut, the Art Academy of Brussels, he discovered the work of illustrator Ever Meulen, a former student of the same school, which greatly influenced him. Another great influence was Arzach, the textless comic by Moebius. Influences outside the world of comics came from the dominant styles of his youth, punk and new wave music.

Bosschaert published his first work in (À Suivre), and produced his first published comic album in 1982 with Ikarus, but his breakthrough was the political-satirical comic strip Pest in 't Paleis (Pest in the Palace, scripted by Guido van Meir, 1983), which appeared in HUMO. But Bosschaert quit making comics and worked for the rest of the decade primarily as an illustrator for different magazines, including Playboy, and authors like Hugo Claus. His main illustrative work appeared first in publications of the Flemish television network VRT, and later in publications of publisher Altiora and popular children's book author Marc De Bel, whom he considers as a kindred spirit and an older brother.

He also continued to make paintings, mainly female nudes and erotic works. Bosschaert is a purely figurative painter, who prefers clarity over concepts.

His first longer running comic series started in 1990, with stories by Marc Legendre. Sam tells the adventures of an adolescent girl working in a small garage. The series came to a halt after 8 albums though, and translations were unsuccessful. While Bosschaert tried to limit his purely commercial work to a few jobs a year, he made an exception for people he feels connected to. He created King Kong Kooks as a catalogue annex comic for fashion designer Walter Van Beirendonck.

More international recognition followed from 2001 on, when he collaborated with comics author Jean Dufaux on Jaguar, a fantasy series published by Casterman and translated in French and Spanish. Local success in Flanders came when he collaborates with comedian Urbanus on De Geverniste Vernepelingskes, a series which parodies famous Belgians, including the two authors.

Bosschaert illustrated album covers for musical artists like The Paranoiacs, Pitti Polak, Plastic Bertrand and Jan De Wilde.

== Bibliography ==
This bibliography contains only his comics, a list of his illustrations is not included.

Series	Years	Volumes	Scenarist	Editor
Icarus	1982	1	Jan Bosschaert	Albino
Pest in't Paleis	1983	1	Guido Van Meir	Kritak
Omni	1987	1	Plijnaar and Van Die	Oberon
Walter & the King Kong Kooks	1989	1	Marc Legendre	Dedalus
Sam	1990-	11	Marc Legendre	Standaard Uitgeverij
De rode draad	1996	1	Jan Bosschaert	Dedalus
De Geverniste Vernepelingskes	1998-2010	6	Urbanus	Standaard Uitgeverij
Jaguar	2001-2005	4	Jean Dufaux	Casterman
Zapman	2001	1	Jan Bosschaert	Arcadia
Getekend Damiaan	2017	1	Bart Maessen, Ruben Boon	Uitgeverij Van Halewyck
Horizontaal	2018	1	Zidrou	Le Lombard

== Awards ==
- 1983: Provinciale Prijs voor de Schilderkunst (Provincial Award for Painting) of the province of Antwerp, Belgium
- 1991: Bronzen Adhemar, Turnhout, Belgium
- 2003: Best Author (Dutch language) at the Prix Saint-Michel, Brussels, Belgium
