= Pom (comics) =

Belgian cartoonist (1919–2014)

- Born: Jozef Van Hove; 16 November 1919 Berchem, Antwerp, Belgium
- Died: 2 May 2014 (aged 94) Olen, Antwerp, Belgium
- Areas: Artist, writer
- Notable works: Piet Pienter en Bert Bibber

Jozef Van Hove, better known as Pom, (16 November 1919 – 2 May 2014) was a Belgian comics writer and artist, mainly known for the humorous-satirical adventure comic strip Piet Pienter en Bert Bibber published in Gazet van Antwerpen. Pom was one of the best known Flemish comics authors of the 1950s. Between 1955 and 1995, 45 comic books were published of his newspaper comic strip. In 2010, a new album of Piet Pienter en Bert Bibber was created by Tom Bouden, with the collaboration of Luc Cromheecke, Dirk Stallaert, Steven Dupré, Martin Lodewijk, Marc Verhaegen, Willy Linthout, Jean-Pol, Steve Van Bael, Kim, Michael Vincent, Wim Swerts, Marc Legendre, Charel Cambré and Hec Leemans.
