= Stan Lauryssens =

Belgian writer

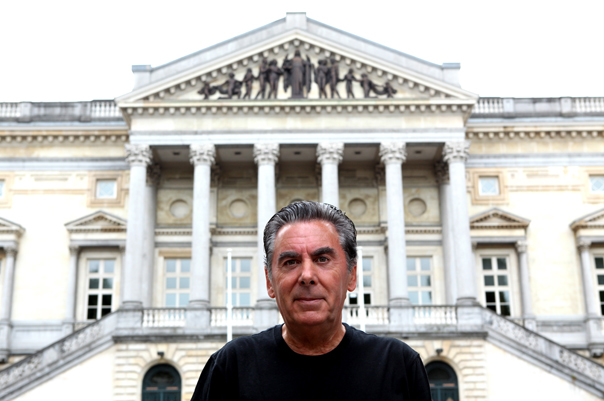
- Born: October 14, 1946 (age 79); Antwerp
- Occupations: Writer, former journalist
- Writing career
- Genres: Fiction, non-fiction

Stan Lauryssens (born 14 October 1946 in Antwerp) is a Belgian writer. He lives in Antwerp and London.

== Career ==
=== Early career ===
Lauryssens worked as a journalist in the 1970s and 1980s and claims to have interviewed with people such as Andy Warhol and some of Hitler’s henchmen such as Otto Günsche.

=== Writing career ===
Lauryssens has written five books about the Nazis, which includes the 1999 biography on German cultural historian and writer Arthur Moeller van den Bruck, The Man Who Invented the Third Reich. Several of Lauryssens's non-fiction books have been serialised in The Mail on Sunday.

== Lawsuit troubles ==
Lauryssens has faced criticism over his depiction of persons such as Salvador Dalí and Julien Schoenaerts. His 2007 book Dalí and I has been met with criticism from the Salvador Dali Foundation over claims about the artist's sex life and that Dalí knowingly participated in the production of fake artworks, which Lauryssens sold for him. The Foundation stated that these claims were made to promote the book and a prospective film that would have starred Cillian Murphy and Al Pacino as Lauryssens and Dalí, respectively. Filming on the adaptation was halted due to a dispute between the Foundation and the movie's director, as the Foundation held the rights to Dali's name. A lawsuit was levied by Matthias Schoenaerts and his mother Dominique Wiche against Lauryssens and the publisher of his biography on Schoenaerts's father Julien Schoenaerts, Manteau, over claims of misrepresentation. In regards to the lawsuit Lauryssens acknowledged that he used artistic license when writing the biography and that it contained untruths and misinformation. The judge ruled that the book must contain a sticker that acknowledged the misinformation, as Lauryssens stated in the book that it was truthful, and that they may not use Matthias Schoenaerts's name or false claims that Julien Schoenaerts was an exhibitionist in interviews or publicity for the book.

In 2019 concerns were raised by Doorbraak that Lauryssens had plagiarized content for his 2019 book Mijn Herinneringen aan Jef Geeraerts, a biography on Belgian writer Jef Geeraerts. Doorbraak reported that Pandora Publishing had made Lauryssens re-write portions of the book twice due to "copying memories of Jeroen Brouwers, Julien Weverbergh and Jef Geeraerts himself". Lauryssens acknowledged the claims and wrote that it was "a professional mistake for which I deserve a red card."

== Personal life and criticism ==
Lauryssens was imprisoned in the late 1980s for selling thousands of fake Dali works, which he claims Dali knew about and approved, after being sought by Interpol for a number of years.

== Bibliography ==
=== Fiction ===
- Black Snow
- Dead Corpses (2003)
- Red Roses (2004)
- Deader Than Dead Too (2005)
- More than Naked (2005)
- No Time for Tears (2006)

=== Non-fiction ===
- The Man Who Invented the Third Reich (1999)
- Dalí & I: The Surreal Story (2007)
- A Curry at Night and Sex on Sunday (2017)
- Mijn Herinneringen aan Jef Geeraerts (2019)
