= Years of the Elephant =

2009 graphic novel by Willy Linthout

- Cover of the English edition of Years of the Elephant

Publication information
- Publisher: Bries
- Genre: Autobiographical
- Publication date: 2009
- Main character(s): Karel; Simone; Wannes

Creative team
- Written by: Willy Linthout
- Artist: Willy Linthout
- Penciller: Willy Linthout
- Inker: Uninked
- Colorist: Uncoloured

Years of the Elephant (Dutch: Jaren van de olifant) is a Flemish graphic novel by Willy Linthout. Linthout was awarded the 2009 Bronzen Adhemar for this work.

== Synopsis ==
Published in 2009, the graphic novel is divided in eight parts, and tells about the death of Linthout's son by suicide.

The main character is Karel, Linthout's alter ego, who has lost his son Wannes due to suicide and struggles with the grief. He and his wife go through very different grieving processes. The work has remarkable visual metaphors, conveying the author's distress during his own grieving process.

The graphic novel was not colored, and Linthout chose not to ink the sketches. Asked about this in an interview with Het Nieuwsblad, Linthout replied that also his son's life was unfinished. He added that he didn't want someone else to finish this comic.

== Awards ==
The graphic novel series earned Linthout the 2009 Bronzen Adhemar. The work was also nominated for the Eisner Awards for Best U.S. Edition of International Material and Best Writer/Artist-Nonfiction, the Ignatz Awards for Outstanding Graphic Novel, the Prix Saint-Michel for best Dutch language comic, and the Stripschapprijs Album of the Year for part 1.
