= Piet Pienter en Bert Bibber =

Belgian comic series

- Piet (left) and Bert (right)
- Author(s): Pom
- Current status/schedule: Discontinued
- Launch date: 16 April 1951.
- End date: 1995
- Syndicate(s): Het Handelsblad, Gazet van Antwerpen
- Genre(s): Action, Humor, adventure, satire

Piet Pienter en Bert Bibber was a Belgian comic series, published between 1951 and 1995, created by Pom (Jozef Van Hove). It is a humoristic adventure strip about two friends, Piet Pienter and Bert Bibber and their female friend Susan.

It was published in the Flemish dialect and notable for being one of the few comics series to never fully adapt the standard Dutch language and, apart from the final album, remained published in black-and-white. Creator Pom also enjoyed making puns and drawing funny signs in the background, often spoofing well known advertisements. For instance: "Oma wast beter" (literally: "Grandma does the laundry better", a pun on the detergent brand Omo). He was particularly notorious for adding ironic commentary about his own stories while narrating the story.

Piet Pienter en Bert Bibber 's popularity was considerable, but proved to be mostly a local Flemish phenomenon; being published in Antwerp newspapers, it was above all popular in that area. Over the years Pom started to dislike his profession, causing new albums to appear less and less frequent. In 1995 the series was terminated, because a certain type of paper that he used for all his stories wasn't produced anymore. Since Pom strongly disliked giving interviews or providing any sort of media attention to himself or his characters Piet Pienter en Bert Bibber, the series faded somewhat out of public view over the decades, despite being fondly remembered by many comics fans.

== History ==
The first story was published in 1951, in the Antwerp newspaper Het Handelsblad. From the tenth album on, in 1955, all stories were pre-published in the daily Gazet van Antwerpen. The albums were published by Uitgeverij De Vlijt, who also published that newspaper. In 1995 the final story was published by Standaard Uitgeverij, who took over the reprints of all the previous albums too.

In 2010, comics artist Tom Bouden drew a homage album about Piet Pienter en Bert Bibber. He received official permission to use the characters, provided that it remained a one-shot album. Another homage album, "Op het spoor van Pom" (2011), contained contributions by 60 Flemish comics artists, with the money being spent for cancer research.

== Characters ==
- Piet Pienter: Piet is the hero and straight man of the series. As his name implies he is very smart ("pienter" means "clever" in Dutch) and usually more calm and level-headed. He is furthermore notable for smoking pipe and according to "Het Vredeswapen" an engineer, especially into electronics, much like Pom himself.
- Bert Bibber: Bert is Piet's best friend and shares house with him. As his name implies he is kind of a coward ("bibber" means "shiver" in Dutch). Due to his impulsive nature, tendency to panic or get aggressive, and general stupidity he provides most of the comic relief in the series. In "In het spoor van Sherlock Holmes" he is a private detective, while in early albums like "Het gestolen Vredeswapen". "De Incaschat der Cordillera" and "Het Raadsel van de Schimmenburcht" he is a travelling salesman.
- Susan: Susan is the daughter of an American billionaire. She is a feisty and attractive young woman who has often helped Piet and Bert with their problems, especially when they lack money. Bert is secretly in love with her, as is Theo Flitser; but there is no mention of either scoring any real success with her, beyond her visiting the "Ice Revue" show with Flitser. Cruising the world in her private yacht initially, over the course of the series she moves in to live at Piet and Bert's house.
- Professor Kumulus: A genius professor, who provides most of the inventions and formulas that get the stories started. He is a good friend of the protagonists.
- Professor Snuffel: Another genius professor and archeologist, whose personality is mostly similar to Kumulus. In later stories he appears less frequently in favor of Kumulus.
- Hilarius Warwinkel: A genius inventor and college friend of Kumulus. However, he suffers from alcoholism, which causes him to make stupid mistakes that bring his inventions into the wrong hands. His appearance was based on Albert Einstein.
- Theo Flitser: A sensation-driven young photographer who always searches the latest scoop. Though a friend of Piet and Bert they see him as somewhat of a nuisance, especially Bert because Susan finds Theo attractive. His appearance is based on Pom's own.
- Commissaris Knobbel: The head of the local police. He is arrogant, easily agitated and dumb, and disliking Piet and Bert he tends to unjustly jail them. Usually Piet and Bert solve the cases while Knobbel takes all credit for it.
