= Jan Vanriet =

Belgian painter and poet

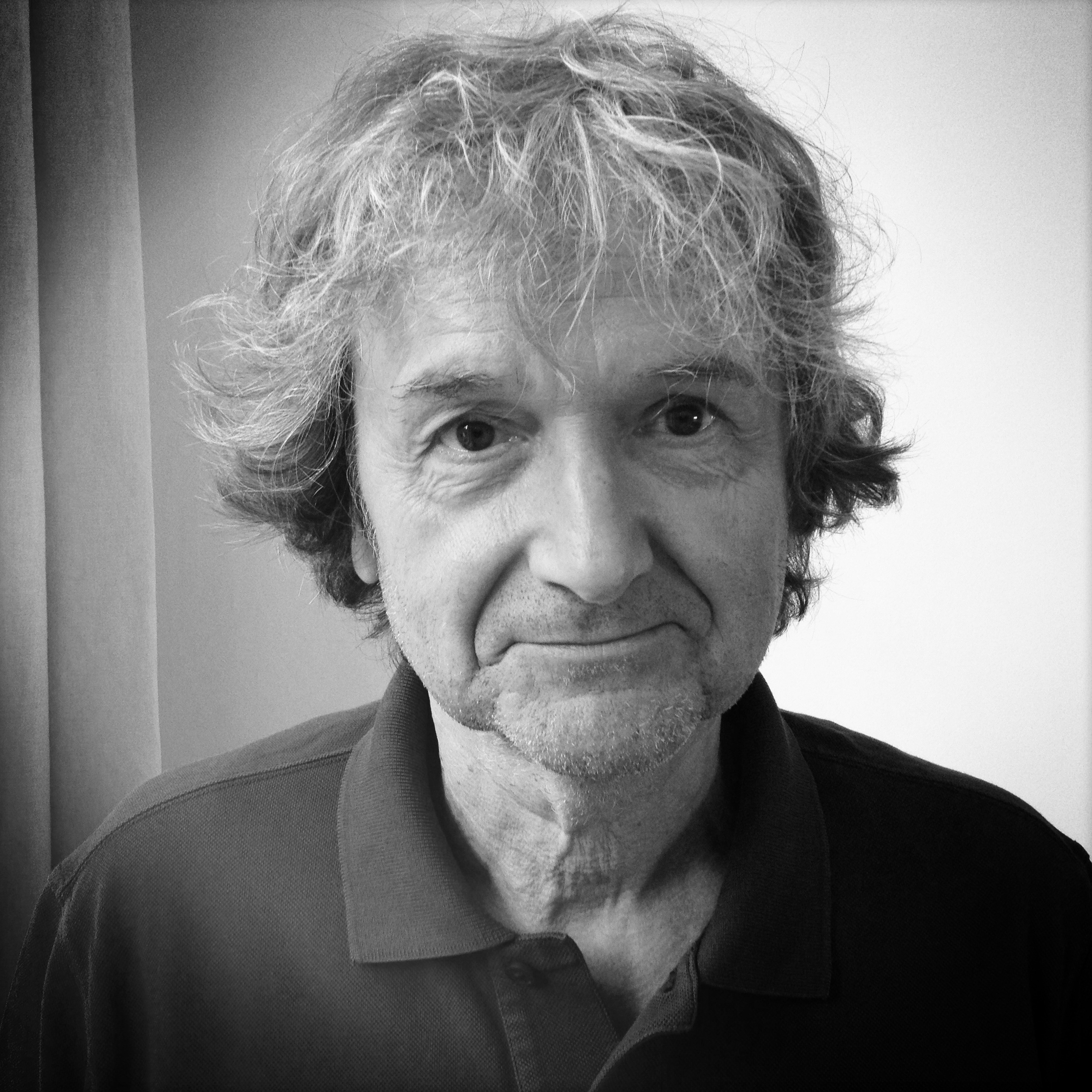
- Jan Vanriet in 2012
- Born: Jan Louis Lucien Vanriet; 21 February 1948 (age 78); Antwerp, Belgium
- Education: Royal Academy of Antwerp
- Known for: Painting; poetry

Jan Vanriet, real name Jan Louis Lucien Vanriet, (21 February 1948) is a Belgian (Flemish) painter and poet.

== Early life and education ==
Jan Vanriet was born in Antwerp and attended the Royal Atheneum of Hoboken where the art critic and promotor Marcel van Jole was one of his teachers. In 1965, while visiting Prague, he met the avant-garde graphic artist Pravoslav Sovak, who at 22 years older, became his mentor. The following year Vanriet was invited to the artist's studio in South Bohemia, where he painted a series of landscapes. Their friendship continues today.

In 1968, Vanriet started painting studies at the Royal Academy of Fine Arts in Antwerp. As a young art student and a debuting poet, he became deeply involved in writers' actions against literary censorship in Belgium, actions that became very famous when he organised a Protest Read-In at the Majestic Theatre in Antwerp, with 40 authors on stage and an audience of over 1000. A second Read-In was organised at Palais des Beaux-Arts in Brussels (Bozar). It was here that he met his future wife, Simone Lenaerts.

In 1971, he became the youngest member of the editing council of the influential political monthly De Nieuwe Maand (The New Month), a group of ambitious politicians from catholic and socialist parties, amongst them, the later prime ministers Jean-Luc Dehaene and Wilfried Martens, and European Commissar Karel van Miert.

== Beginnings as a painter ==
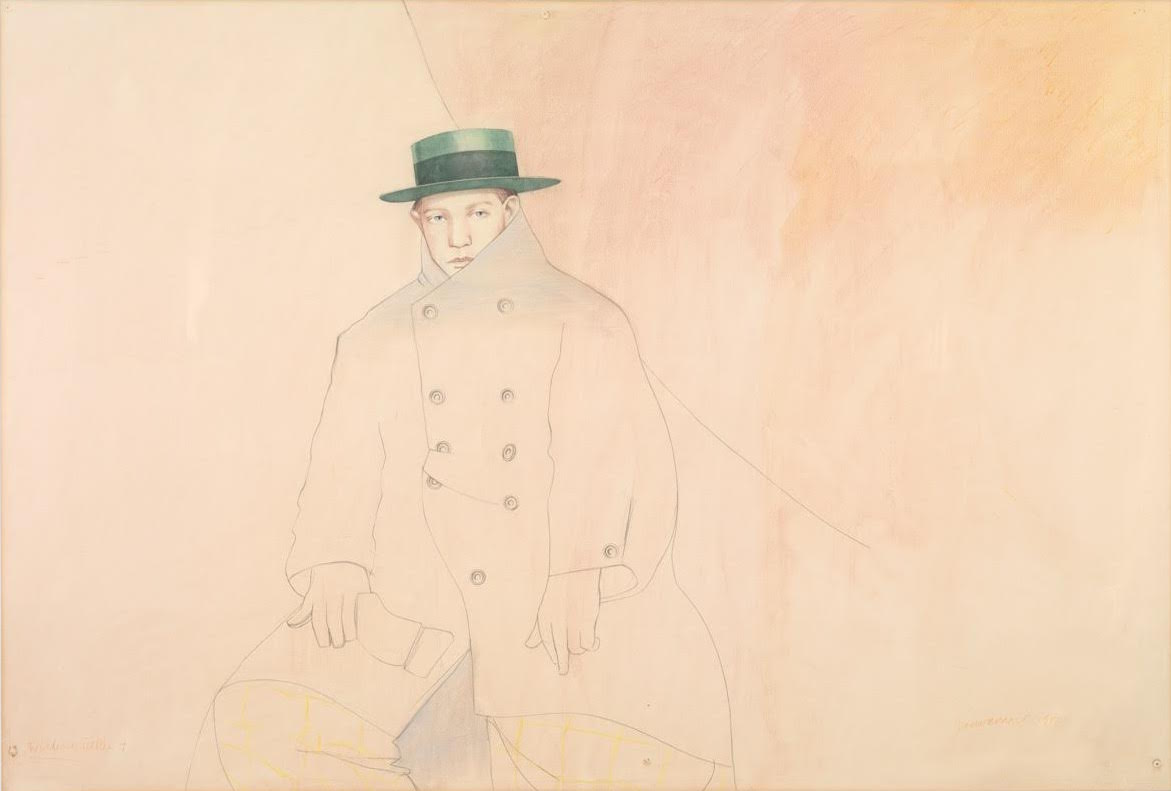
Tatlin, 1980, watercolour, coll. Royal Museum of Fine Arts, Antwerp

After his studies in 1971, Vanriet’s first gallery exhibition was at De Zwarte Panter, directed by his former fellow student Adriaan Raemdonck. Immediately afterwards, a partnership was born with Jan Lens and his reputed gallery, Lens Fine Art, the most prestigious Belgian gallery at the time, which was to last for ten years. During this period, he developed into an excellent aquarellist and a few books were published: Maria Lecina, Death in Venice, Het teken van de hamster.

Vanriet also developed as a writer. Collections of poetry were published by Manteau and for Flemish Radio 3 (now Radio Klara), he wrote a series of poems entitled Staat van Beleg (State of Siege), set to music by Bob Porter. He wrote articles for weekly magazines such as Vrij Nederland and for the Dutch monthly magazine Avenue, he edited a literary contribution from Belgium.

He took part in the Menton Biennale and exhibited at Galerie Brusberg in Hannover and Galleria del Naviglio in Milan, where he met the distinguished French art historian and critic Pierre Restany, who became a fervent admirer of Vanriet's work. The Palais de Beaux-Arts (Bozar) in Brussels and the Kunstverein in Darmstadt exhibited the Death in Venice series. The Royal Museum of Fine Arts in Antwerp purchased his work. At this time, he began collaboration with the literary magazine Revolver, designing its covers until 2010.

== Biennials ==
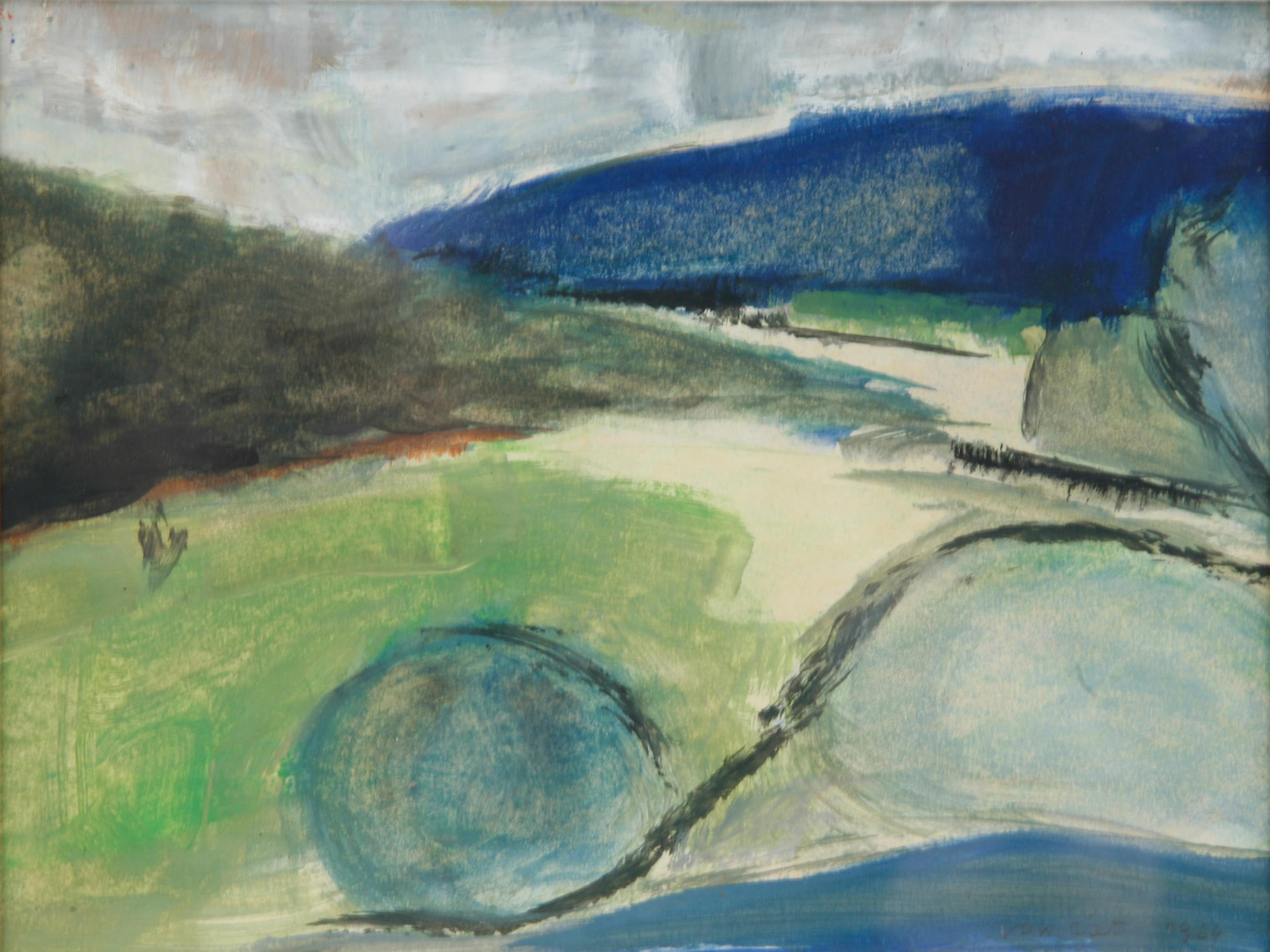
Bohemia, 1966, oil on paper, painted in Sovak’s studio

In 1982, he joined the prestigious Galerie Isy Brachot in Brussels and Paris, where he presented 11 solo exhibitions in 10 years. Edward Lucie-Smith published a monograph on his work and Pierre Restany wrote the text for Vanriet’s first solo exhibition at Galerie Isy Brachot in Paris, l’Etat du siege du regard. Vanriet was selected for the Sao Paulo Biennale (1979) and began a long series of exhibitions in California, mostly at the Wenger Gallery in San Diego, and later in Los Angeles.

Vanriet's work is in the collections of, among others, the Museum of Contemporary Art San Diego, the San Diego Museum of Art and the Hewlett Packard Corporation in Palo Alto. He was appointed Director of Antwerp’s Hoboken Academy of Art. He left the school in 1999.

The Ministry of Flemish Culture published a monograph of his work and selected him to represent Belgium at the Venice Biennale (1984) together with Karel Dierickx and Jan Fabre. Vanriet was invited to participate in the Olympiad of Arts in Seoul (1989) and his monumental canvas Compte à règler is now in the National Museum of Contemporary Art in Seoul. In between, he stayed two summers in New York to work in Bernar Venet’s studio, where his friend artist David Levine often came to visit him. Commissions for portraits were awarded by the New York lawyer and art patron Harry Torczyner, the Belgian Parliament and the University of Louvain (portrait of rector Pieter De Somer for the Ceremony Hall).

In the context of Antwerp 93 (Antwerp as European Cultural Capital 1993), the Elzenveld Art Centre opened new gallery areas with a large-scale exhibition of Vanriet’s recent work. This was not his only contribution to this festival year: he also painted the entrance hall ceilings in the restored Bourla Theatre.

1990 The Special Prize at the Art Festival Seoul, together with John Chamberlain and Mimmo Rotella.

== Closing the Royal Museum of Fine Arts, Antwerp ==
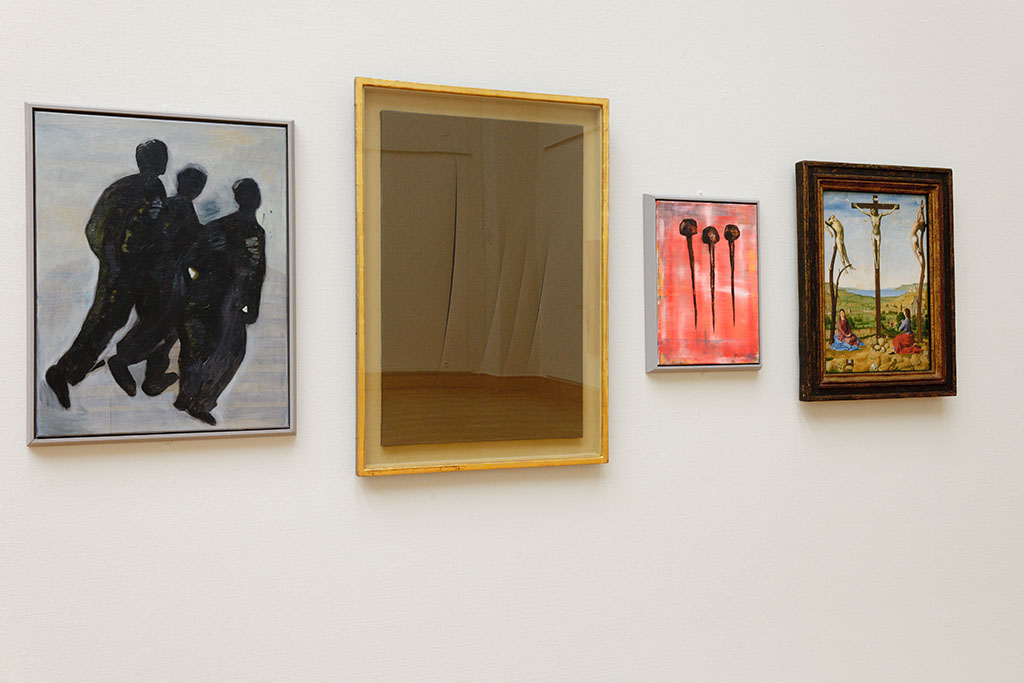
Closing Time, 2010: Vanriet’s work with paintings by Fontana and Antonello da Messina

In the mid-1990s, Vanriet finished a series of 50 portraits as well as Volgens Johannes, 35 large works on Korean hanji paper, inspired by the Gospel of John, for which Dutch poet Benno Barnard wrote an epic text. An exhibition was held at the Veranneman Foundation in Kruishoutem, together with a show by French abstract painter Pierre Soulages.

Meanwhile, Jan Vanriet renewed his partnership with De Zwarte Panter Gallery in Antwerp. New works were collected by the McNay Art Museum in San Antonio, Texas, and by Deutsche Bank, Royal Belge, Crédit Lyonnais and Zürich Insurance. The Stedelijk Prentenkabinet at the Plantin-Moretus Museum in Antwerp also procured preparatory studies for Johannes.

In 2001 he received the Van Acker Prize in Bruges (previous laureats: Hugo Claus, Frans Masereel, Roger Raveel).

In May 2004, the Lippisches Landesmuseum in Detmold (Germany) exhibited Transport, paintings 1999-2004, many of them inspired by the tragic events in World War II. For Vanriet this is not an unusual theme; his parents and other members of his family engaged in the resistance against Nazi invaders, but they were made prisoner and deported to the concentration camps of Mauthausen and Ravensbrück.

A year later, in 2005, Vanriet travelled to Israel for the hanging of his triptych Nathan the Wise in the historical building of the Jerusalem International YMCA, designed by Arthur Loomis Harmon. The Flemish Government and other governmental institutions donated Vanriet's work as their official present on the occasion of the state visits of Jorge Sampaio, President of Portugal, Viktor Yushchenko, President of Ukraine, Romano Prodi and José Manuel Barroso, both Presidents of the European Commission, Jack Lang, French Minister of Culture and more.

In 2010, Paul Huvenne, the director of the Royal Museum of Fine Arts in Antwerp invited Jan Vanriet to ‘close’ the museum, where enormous works of renovation were to start. With the exhibition Closing Time he proposed a selection of 170 masterpieces from the collection, including works by Rubens, Van Eyck, Van Dyck, Titian, Cranach, Ensor and Modigliani in confrontation with a retrospective selection of his own work. 88,000 visitors attended.

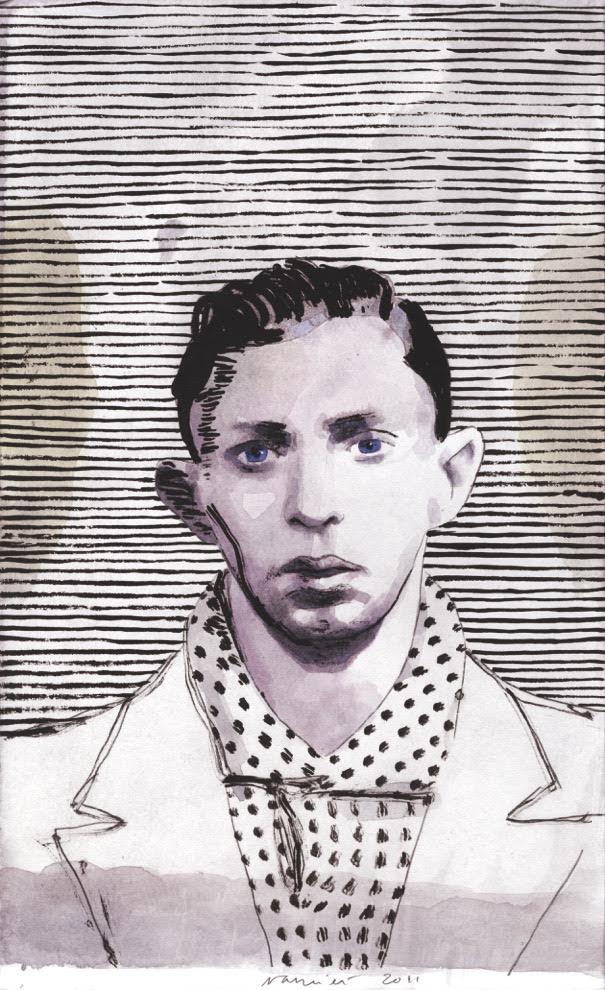
Moszek, 2011, watercolour, coll. British Museum London

That same year, Vanriet painted the official portrait of the departing cardinal Godfried Danneels for the Archbishop's palace in Malines. In 2013, the public was stunned by Vanriet's series of Jewish deportees from Belgium to Auschwitz. The exhibition Losing Face was shown at the Museum Kazerne Dossin in Malines. Belgian press proclaimed Losing Face as one of Europe's major exhibitions. The prominent Flemish author Stefan Hertmans and the Hungarian novelist György Konrád contributed to the accompanying publication.

== Newest projects ==
Closed Doors was the inaugural exhibition of Roberto Polo Gallery in Brussels, in November 2012. It started an intense and inspiring collaboration between the artist and the American art historian, theorist and gallerist. In February 2015, Vanriet’s second solo show, Vanity, opened the new extended gallery, which virtually doubled its size.

This collaboration brought Losing Face to the Jewish Museum and Tolerance Centre in Moscow (January 2015), where President Vladimir Putin visited the show. This exhibition was designed by the architect Sergei Tchoban. In May 2015, the National Museum in Gdansk proposed Song of Destiny, a survey show of Vanriet’s paintings from 1986-2014. In the accompanying book, Polish poet Adam Zagajewski made an appearance. The National Museum in Gdansk acquired 2 of his paintings in 2014. The same year, 5 of Vanriet’s watercolours entered the collection of the British Museum in London, and The Museum of the History of Polish Jews in Warsaw acquired 2 of his paintings. The New Art Gallery Walsall acquired 2 of his paintings in 2015. In January 2016, Vanriet's UK premiere took place with a survey show, The Music Boy at the New Art Gallery Walsall. The eponymous exhibition catalogue contains essays by Charlotte Mullins, Andrew Graham-Dixon and Martin Herbert. Hollands Diep, the new publishing house of former Bezige Bij director Robbert Ammerlaan, publishes Moederland (Motherland), Vanriet’s recent poetry. In September 2016, Vanriet, along with 15 renowned painters, 7 other Belgians and 8 Americans, participated in the Brussels manifesto exhibition 'Painting After Postmodernism', curated by Barbara Rose, a show also presented in Malaga and in the Caserta Palace near Napels. In 2018 he showed his series 'Ex Voto' at De Zwarte Panter and published 'Radeloos geluk’ (Desperate Happiness, published by Hollands Diep), 580 pages of autobiographical essays, nominated for the Bookspot Prize for Literature in the Netherlands. In 2019 Poëziecentrum publishes an overview of Vanriet’s poetry, ‘Kouwe kleren’ (Cold Clothes).

== Public spaces and applied art ==
Vanriet's ceiling painting at the Bourla Theatre opened doors for more commissioned work in public spaces. Best known are To The Energy!, a triptych for energy producer Electrabel, The Haunted Domain, an integrated mural 110 metres in length for the new headquarters of Kredietbank in Brussels, and two even larger projects for Roularta Publishing and for Metro De Brouckère, both located in Brussels.

Since 1987 Jan Vanriet has designed the stage for Raamtheater, Geletterde Mensen and the international literary tours of Behoud de Begeerte in Madrid, Barcelona, London, Amsterdam and Aix-en-Provence, for VRT (Flemish Television) and the Royal Flemish Theatre Brussels (KVS).

He was commissioned by newspaper De Morgen to illustrate a novel daily by Hugo Claus, and the latter wrote poems for ten of Vanriet’s etchings, published in the book The Ape In Efese. Publishers in the Netherlands and France (De Bezige Bij, Balland, Le Seuil) illustrated the covers of their novels with his work. He has also designed posters, such as for the Flemish Bookfair 1999. From December 2000, he began a weekly drawing for ZENO, the essay supplement of the newspaper De Morgen. In 2003 he started his own column EenOog in Weekend Knack and in 2008, he wrote and illustrated a weekly column, Joetoeb, on art & culture for De Morgen Magazine.

In 2004, Vanriet was commissioned to create a mural titled "The City Moves in the Palm of My hand" for the De Brouckère metro station in Brussels. The artwork was printed on finished edge panels from PolyVision. In 2018 he designed a stained glass window for The Holland College in Louvain.

In 2007, the Dutch author Cees Nooteboom invited Vanriet to collaborate on a book with his short stories, Red Rain, first published by Suhrkamp in Germany. Afterwards the publishing house returned to Vanriet for the illustration of a series covers for other Nooteboom books on the occasion of his 75th birthday.

== Personal life ==
In 1971, he married Simone Lenaerts, with whom he has two sons, Bram and Menno, and a daughter Eva. Simone Lenaerts made her debut as a novelist in 2009, won the Flemish Debut Prize and was nominated for the Academica Prize in the Netherlands. They live and work in Antwerp. and from 1990 until 2014, they partly lived in the south of France, in Crillon le Brave. In 2017 he was elected as a member of the European Academy of Sciences and Arts in Salzburg.

== Literature ==
2019 Kouwe kleren, Poëziecentrum
2018 Radeloos geluk, Hollands Diep
2016 Moederland, Hollands Diep
2014 Oud zeer, Plantin Instituut voor Typografie
2012 Leegstand, De Bezige Bij Antwerpen
2008 Stormlicht, Wagner & van Santen
1984 Geen hond die brood lust, Manteau
1979 Staat van beleg, Manteau
1974 Bella Ciao, Ontwikkeling
1973 Vast Tapijt, Manteau
1971 Met de Ramblers uit vissen, Revolver
1969 Met gehavend gemoed, Yang

== Selected publications ==
Ex Voto, Eric Rinckhout, De Zwarte Panter, 2018
The Music Boy, Andrew Graham-Dixon, Martin Herbert and Charlotte Mullins, The New Art Gallery Walsall, 2016
Song of Destiny, Paul Huvenne, Adam Zagajewski and Zofia Machnica, National Museum Gdansk, 2015
Losing Face, Stefan Hertmans and György Konrád, Jewish Museum and Tolerance Center Moscow, 2015
Omens, De Zwarte Panter, 2015
Vanity, Jan Vanriet, Charlotte Mullins, Lannoo, 2015
Losing Face, Stefan Hertmans and György Konrád, Ludion 2013
Closed Doors, Eric Rinckhout, Roberto Polo Gallery, 2012
Closing Time, Maarten Doorman en Eric Rinckhout, Ludion | De Bezige Bij, 2010
Jan Vanriet, Parcours 1966-2008, Marc Ruyters, Snoeck, 2008
Een Winterreise, Cees Nooteboom & Jan Vanriet, Literarte, 2007
De Testamenten, Jan Vanriet, with text by Marc Ruyters and Luc Devisscher, Davidsfonds Uitgeverij, 2005
Transport, Cees Nooteboom and Vera Scheef, Lippisches Landesmuseum Detmold, 2004
Transport, Bernard Dewulf, Art Concern, 2002
De reiziger is blind, Jean Pierre Rondas, De Geus, 2001
Café Aurora, Stefan Hertmans, De Geus, 2000
Jan Vanriet, Freddy de Vree, Lannoo, 1996
Matière et Mémoire, Pierre Restany, Centrum Elzenveld, 1993
Jan Vanriet, or the Subtle Disruption, Wim Meeuwis, Internationale Culturele Samenwerking, Biennale di Venezia, 1984
Jan Vanriet, L’état de siège du regard, Pierre Restany, Galerie Isy Brachot, Paris, 1983
Jan Vanriet, Edward Lucie-Smith, Uitgeverij Manteau, Antwerpen, & van Gennep, 1982
