= Seventh Heaven (1993 film) =

1993 Belgian-Dutch romantic comedy film

- Theatrical release poster
- Directed by: Jean-Paul Lilienfeld
- Written by: Jean Paul Lilienfeld
- Produced by: Paul Voorthuysen; Erwin Provoost; Cyril de Rouvre
- Starring: Urbanus; Renée Soutendijk
- Cinematography: Willy Stassen
- Edited by: Philippe Ravoet
- Music by: Jacques Davidovici
- Production companies: Added films VTM; TROS
- Distributed by: United International Pictures
- Release date: 1 April 1993
- Running time: 94 minutes
- Countries: Belgium; Netherlands
- Language: Dutch

De Zevende Hemel (English: Seventh Heaven) is a 1993 Belgian-Dutch romantic comedy film directed by Jean-Paul Lilienfeld, based on a script by Jean-Paul Lilienfeld translated by Urbanus.

== Cast ==
- Urbanus as Samuel
- Renée Soutendijk as Charlyne
- Hilde Van Mieghem as Micheline
- Peter Van den Begin as Claude
- Ludo Busschots as Handelsreiziger
- Annick Christiaens as Girl with dog
- Chris Corens as Kruidenier
- Kitty Courbois as Hotelhoudster
- Jean-Paul Lilienfeld as Colombani
- Philippe Merchiers as Pinocchio
- Ann Petersen as Conciërge
- Marijke Pinoy as Receptioniste
- Ann Pira as Girl in bed
- Senne Rouffaer as Troyon
- Liesa Servranckx as Baby 1
- Jan Steen as Werkman
- Tom Van Bauwel
- Lucas van den Eijnde
- Loes van den Heuvel as Prostitute
- Koen Van Overschelde as Young Samuel

== Production ==
The film was written and directed by French director Jean-Paul Lilienfeld with Urbanus and Renée Soutendijk in the lead roles. Filming took place in Texel and Brussels. Unlike Hector and Koko Flanel, Seventh Heaven was not specifically written with Urbanus in mind.
