= Urbanus (comic strip) =

Comic strip

- Urbanus and Amedee the fly.
- Created by: Willy Linthout

Publication information
- Publisher: Loempia; Standaard Uitgeverij
- Formats: Original material for the series has been published as a set of graphic novels.
- Original language: Dutch
- Genre
- Publication date: November 10, 1982 – October 26, 2022

Creative team
- Writer(s): Willy Linthout; Urbanus; Ann Smets (2019–present)
- Artist(s): Willy Linthout

Urbanus was a Flemish celebrity comic strip created by Willy Linthout and loosely based on Flemish comedian and singer Urbanus. The stories were written by Willy Linthout, Urbanus and Ann Smets, and drawn by Linthout. The first story was published in 1982 and was such a success that Urbanus ran for more than 40 years, becoming the longest-running and most successful Flemish comic strip based on a celebrity. It is also the longest-running celebrity comic in the world made by the same writer/artist team. The series sells well in the Netherlands too, due to Urbanus' popularity there.

== Background and concept ==
The strip originated from an idea by Willy Linthout. In 1982, Linthout imagined creating a comic strip about comedian Urbanus. Publisher Jef Meert was able to arrange a meeting at his house, in which he proposed the concept and showed Urbanus the drawings. Urbanus liked Linthout's idea and his drawings. Urbanus started as an experiment, but after the first album was released, Linthout was already working on the sequel. Linthout made the first two albums alone. The first album sold 50,000 copies right away. From December 16, 1982, until April 25, 1996, all albums were published by Uitgeverij Loempia, a publishing company created by Linthout and Jef Meert. Since 1996 Standaard Uitgeverij does the publishing.

Linthout and Urbanus explained how a comic book of Urbanus was made: Linthout came up with an idea, wrote the synopsis, and submitted it to Urbanus. Then, the two started writing together, and eventually Linthout drew the comic book.

In the series Urbanus is portrayed as an eleven to twelve-year old version of himself, despite his full-grown beard. Just like the real Urbanus he lives in Tollembeek, but here end all similarities. Urbanus is portrayed as a bad young boy who frequently tries to trick the local villagers, his parents, his teacher, his fellow students and gets into trouble for it. The style of comedy is absurd, black and often vulgar. All animals in this comic strip are able to talk. Pop culture references to TV shows, comics, cartoons, films and Urbanus' own merchandise are frequently made. The authors deliberately use Flemish dialect instead of standard Dutch and also deliberately keep the drawing style naïve and simple, inspired by the series of Marc Sleen.

The albums are usually long adventure stories, but some are one-page gags as well.

On 26 October 2022, after 201 stories, the series was discontinued.

== Characters ==
The main characters are:

- Urbanus: A young ten to twelve-year-old boy. He frequently misbehaves and gets punished for it.
- Cesar: Urbanus' father. He is a pigeon racer and farmer who spends most of his time with smoking pipe, drinking beer, reading his newspaper, watching TV and committing adultery with local prostitutes.
- Eufrazie: Urbanus' pious mother. She is a housewife who devoutly believes in the Roman Catholic Church and spends most of her time with brushing off a Virgin Mary statue on her closet.
- Nabuko Donosor: Nabuko Donosor is Urbanus' dog. He is completely yellow, wears slippers on his feet and the upper jaw of his head floats above the lower jaw. He is actually an alien lifeform, but treated like a dog by everyone else.
- Amedee: Urbanus' house fly. He is hyper intelligent and often understands situations or finds solutions to problems the others can't comprehend.
- Annatol: Urbanus' goldfish.
- Wieske: Urbanus' pig.
- Nonkel Fillemon: The family's rich and elderly uncle. Urbanus' family is always waiting for him to pass away so they can inherit his massive fortune, but he always survives.
- Jef Patat: A local poor and sleazy scoundrel who lives under a bridge. He is often active in criminal affairs and tries to trick everybody. Patat is more or less the antagonist of the series, if Urbanus doesn't perform that part himself.
- Meester Vladimir Kweepeer: The local sadistic but otherwise not very bright headmaster.
- Dikke Herman: An obese boy who wears glasses and has a large yellow quiff on his head. He is a frequent target of abuse by other characters, most notably Urbanus himself.
- Het Negerken: A local black boy who is nicknamed "The Little Negro". His real name is Botswana.
- Meneer Pastoor: The local Roman Catholic priest. He enjoys drinking sacramental wine and frequently neglects his oath of celibacy by visiting local prostitutes.
- René and Modest: Two local police officers who enjoy beating up people.
- Juffrouw Pussy: A young and attractive female teacher who is adored by everyone, especially Urbanus.
- Stef, Staff & Stylo: A gang consisting of three thieves who are brothers of differing height. They are clearly inspired by The Daltons.
- God: God is portrayed as an angry old man living up in Heaven. He is married and has two children. God is often agitated by Urbanus' behaviour on Earth.

== Animated film ==
In 1992 a partial animated adaptation of the 18th "Urbanus" album "Het Lustige Kapoentje" was made in collaboration with 20th Century Fox. Urbanus voiced himself. It was released on video, but didn't have much success.

Some animated shorts were made in 1999, based on the gag comics. They are made available on Urbanus' official site.

In 2019 an animated feature film Urbanus de Vuilnisheld premiered in Flemish theaters.

== Crossover ==
In 1997 Urbanus and Linthout made a crossover comic strip named "Kiekebanus", in which characters from their series meet characters from Merho's series De Kiekeboes. In another De Kiekeboes album, "Bij Fanny op Schoot" (2005), Urbanus and his family were also guest stars.

== In popular culture ==
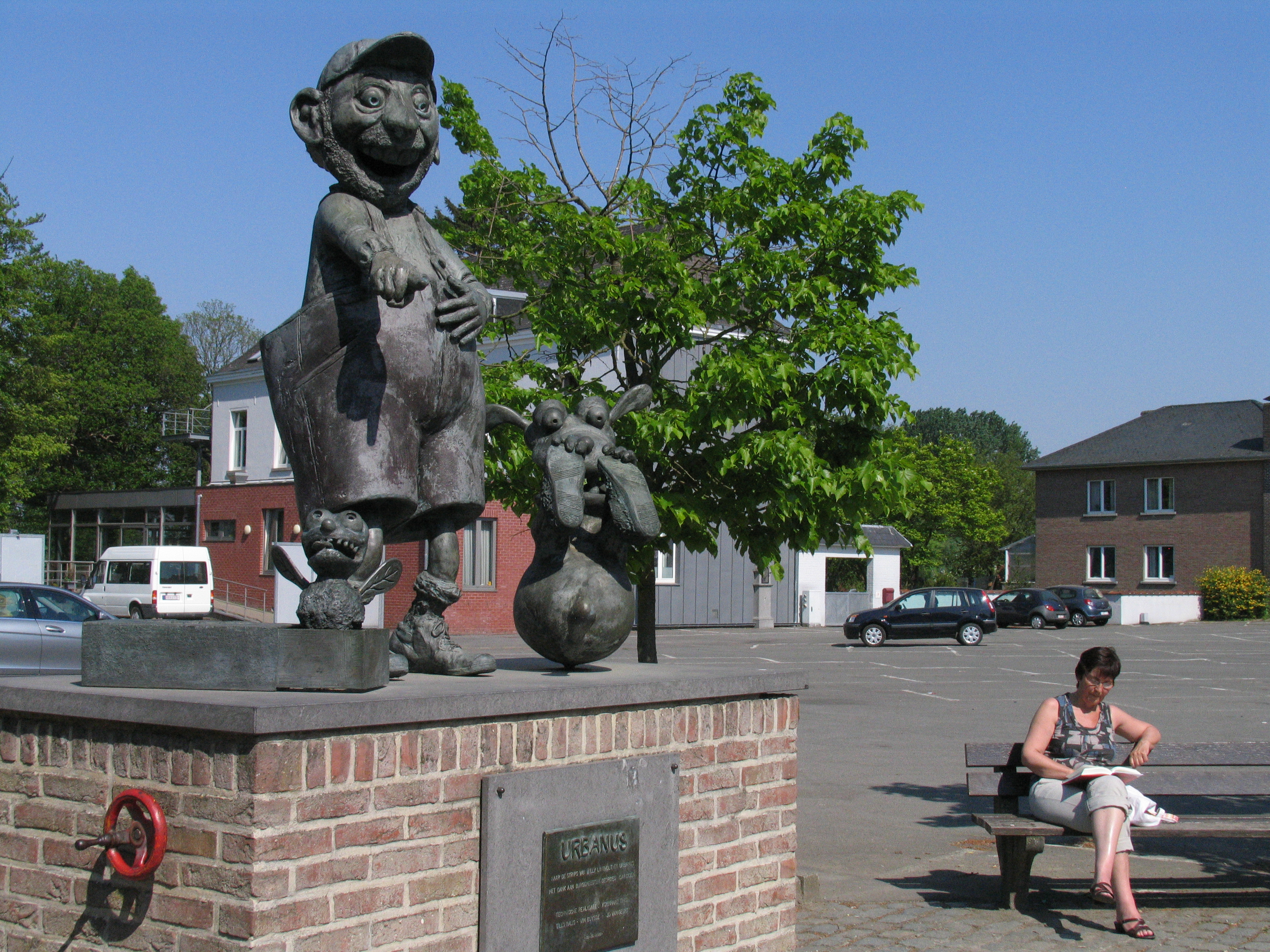
Urbanus statue in Tollembeek

On April 8, 2000, Urbanus, Amedee and Nabuko Donosor received their own statue in Tollembeek. It was designed by Koen Tinel.

Urbanus also received a statue in Middelkerke on July 7, 2001. It was sculpted by Luc Cauwenberghs.
