= Eric Joris =

Eric Joris (born 7 July 1955) is a Belgian artist. After studying German, French, economics, visual arts and design, he started his career as a comics artist, drawing the series Chelsy with text by Jean Dufaux. He won the 1993 Bronzen Adhemar, the biannual award from the Flemish Community for a comics artist. In 1995 he made the comic Les Cuisiniers Dangereux with writers Herman Brusselmans and Tom Lanoye and others. Afterwards he switched from comics to digital art and founded the collective CREW.

== CREW ==
CREW is a group of researchers and artists, founded by Eric Joris in Brussels in 1990. They combine performance and digital arts in theatre productions. Their first immersive performance, CRASH, based on the work of J. G. Ballard, was created in 2004, followed by U_raging standstil in 2006, EUX in 2008 and W in 2009.

== Works ==
=== Theatre ===
- 2002: Philoctetes, written and directed by Joris, performed in Rotterdam
- 2004: Crash, written and directed by Joris, performed in Rotterdam
- 2006: U_raging standstil, written and directed by Joris, performed in Antwerp and Rotterdam (as "'u'_razende stilstand")
- 2008: EUX, written and directed by Joris, performed in Rotterdam (as O_Rex)
- 2009: W, written and directed by Joris, performed in Mons and Barcelona
- 2011: Terra nova, written and directed by Joris, performed in Brussels
- 2013: MS DOS / Prometheus geketend, written by Joris, performed in Rotterdam
- 2014: Explorer/ Prometheus ontketend, written by Joris, performed in Rotterdam
- 2016: Internet of Things/ Prometheus de vuurbrenger, written by Joris, performed in Amsterdam and Antwerp
  - 2019: De internet trilogie, combination of the three Promethean pieces, Rotterdam

=== Other performances ===
- 2016: Absence, Ghent
- 2017: C.A.P.E., Brussels: performed during the Metropolis festival in Copenhagen, Denmark
- Hands-on Hamlet
- 2019: Hamlet’s Lunacy
- 2023: Delirious Departures, performed at the Fabbrica Europa festival in Florence, Italy
- 2023: New Departures, Brussels
- 2025: The Unheard, performed in 2025 at La Mèche Courte festival in Montréal, Canada
- 2026Tremens, performed at the Fabbrica Europa festival in Florence, and in Munchen at the Bayerisches Staatsschauspiel

His works have also been performed at the Expo 2010 in Shangai, Festival d’Avignon, Festival of the Future Munich, in Austria, the US, ...
