= De Kiekeboes =

Belgian comic strip

- Main characters with the logo of the series
- Created by: Merho

Publication information
- Publisher: Standaard Uitgeverij
- Schedule: quarterly
- Formats: Original material for the series has been published as a set of ongoing series and graphic novels.
- Original language: Dutch
- Genre: Action/adventure
- Publication date: 1977
- Main character(s): Marcel Kiekeboe; Charlotte Kiekeboe; Fanny Kiekeboe; Konstantinopel Kiekeboe

Creative team
- Writer(s): Merho
- Artist(s): Merho
- Penciller(s): Thomas Du Caju; Kristof Fagard
- Inker(s): Peter Koeken; Kristof Fagard
- Colourist(s): Ria Smit; Ine Merhottein; Kristof Fagard

Reprints
- The series has been reprinted, at least in part, in French and English.

De Kiekeboes is a comic series created by Belgian artist Merho in 1977. The series appears in Dutch. It is first published in the newspapers Gazet van Antwerpen and Het Belang van Limburg and then published as comic books by Standaard Uitgeverij. The series is the best-selling comic in Flanders, but is unsuccessful abroad, with only a few publications in French and English.

== History ==
De Kiekeboes debuted in 1977. Merho had previously worked with Willy Vandersteen but wanted to create his own series. The first story, De Wollebollen, started in Het Laatste Nieuws on 15 February 1977.

New albums in the series appear every three months, and sell over 100,000 copies each. Like most Flemish comic strips, De Kiekeboes comics are steady sellers, with most of the series available for sale at any one time. New titles are the best selling comics in Flanders, with some 80,000 copies sold in the first year of publication. In 2007, only the Dutch translation of the final Harry Potter book sold more copies.

After being assisted for a while by Dirk Stallaert, Merho announced that from 1 January 2006 on, the comics would be drawn by Steve Van Bael and Thomas Du Caju, who would each produce two comics a year. Merho continues to write the stories and to make early sketches. In October 2007 Kristof Fagard had to take over from Steve Van Bael and continued in tandem with Thomas Du Caju as pencilers.

To celebrate the thirtieth anniversary of the comic strip in 2007, an exposition was held in the Belgian Centre for Comic Strip Art and a wall painting was unveiled in Antwerp. Statues of Kiekeboe and of his daughter Fanny are placed in Middelkerke. Another statue of Kiekeboe can be found in Halle-Zoersel.

In 2023, after 46 years, illustrator Merho decided to stop working on De Kiebeboes.

== Style ==
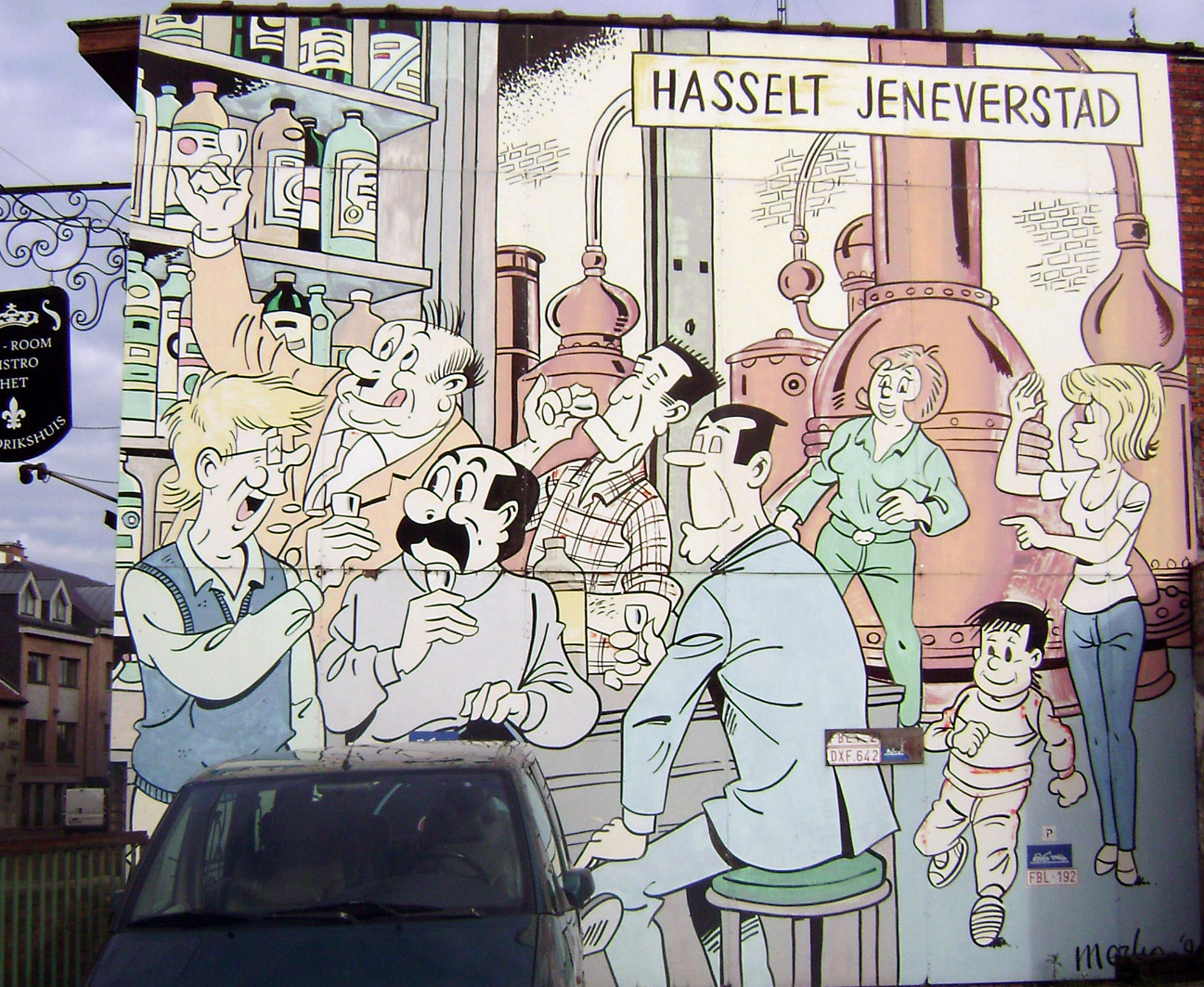
'Kiekeboes', a mural in Hasselt, 1996

The creator Merho having started his career in Willy Vandersteen's studio, it was only natural for his own Kiekeboe series to follow up on those traditions, especially the best-known Suske en Wiske. Soon however, the horizon widened: contrary to his peer, Merho never applied a time machine, setting all stories in very recognisable contemporary places and atmospheres. On the contrary, themes would include actuality, up to and including social controversies like sex in general and non-conformist sexuality in particular, but also the consumption of and trade in drugs, laundering of crime money (#70), corruption of politicians (#77), and more. The Kiekeboe series can thus be said to, on the one hand, continue the tradition of Flemish family comic strips like Nero, Jommeke, Piet Pienter en Bert Bibber and Suske en Wiske within the larger picture of the Belgian Comic tradition, yet on the other hand open up to a wider view on contemporary society and politics, adapting the genre to the 21st century. On top of that, the author Merho indulges in experiments with the technicalities and limitations of the comic strip genre and medium, especially in #26. Neither does he neglect referring to the French-language counterparts in multi-lingual Belgium, Tintin and the publishers getting particular attention.

== Characters ==
Ordered by approximate number of appearances.

- Marcel Kiekeboe: protagonist of the comic book series, sort of an 'average Joe' with a non-descript average office job, attracts adventure and goes along with it. Thinks quite good of himself, but repeatedly turns out to be the least smart of the family.
- Charlotte Kiekeboe: Marcel's wife, housewife, often (mostly unwillingly) joining the adventures. She's smarter and more composed than Marcel and this usually helps the family getting out of trouble. She's ever distrustful of Firmin Van De Kasseien, who always uses Kiekeboe to settle his difficult situations, either relational or business-related.
- Fanny Kiekeboe: their daughter, around 20 years old. Socially engaged (feminism, animal rights,...), self-conscious, sexy and adventurous, she often gets in trouble. Before the 100th album, she had a new boyfriend in almost every story. After that, she was in some more or less steady relationships.
- Konstantinopel Kiekeboe: their son, extremely smart (certainly in the first stories), in primary school. Sometimes a troublemaker, sometimes cautious, always clever.
- The fat lady: recurring extra, appears in at least one image of every album, but never has any role of significance (though she does sometimes have an influence).
- Jens: a professional stuntman and boyfriend of Fanny in a solid relationship around the 100th albums. Until Fanny breaks up with him. He continues to appear now and then, in recent albums, and tries to help Fanny when she's in trouble. However, Fanny also ends up saving Jens quite often.
- Leon Van Der Neffe: neighbour of the Kiekeboe family, professional soldier but not at all a war veteran, ill-tempered and paranoid. Big enemy of Marcel - but never the 'bad guy'. On occasion, Kiekeboe and Van Der Neffe even collaborate (#12, #15). His name means (in the Antwerp patois) "next door guy".
- Carmella Van Der Neffe: Leon Van Der Neffe's (ex-)wife.
- Joeksel and Froefroe: Leon and Carmella Van Der Neffe's children, friends with Konstantinopel, much to the dislike of their fathers. Like many early characters, they have their names derived from the Antwerp dialect: Joeksel standing for itching, whereas Froefroe refers to the bangs haircut style - which she prominently displays.
- Fernand Goegebuer: another neighbour of the Kiekeboe family, all-around good guy, meddlesome fool, spits as he speaks. His name stands for "good neighbour" in shrill contrast to Van Der Neffe.
- Jozefien "Moemoe" Kiekeboe: Marcel's mother, always complaining about/to him and talking about the 'adventures' of her (never shown) best friend Mrs. Stokvis. Worse than the archetypal "mother in law" by the author's own word.
- Inspecteur Sapperdeboere: Inspector of local police, is more interested in food than in his cases, which is why the main family has to solve them themselves.
- Firmin Van De Kasseien: Marcel's boss, constantly has extramarital affairs with young beautiful women, often his "secretary"; and often needs Marcel to keep them hidden.
- Balthazar: 'self-employed' thief, 'the only burglar in the golden pages', tries to do small crimes but constantly fails.
- Mevrouw Stokvis: unseen best friend of Moemoe, even when the story revolves around her (#56), it's because she 'disappears' and she is not seen.
- Dédé La Canaille: French criminal, is caught because of Marcel and subsequently wants to kill him whenever he regains his freedom (similar to Sideshow Bob).
- Mona: old love of Marcel, until she gets bitten by a vampire and becomes a sexy vampirewoman, tries to seduce Marcel every time she shows up.
- Timothea Triangl: short, transgender 'master'-criminal.
- Nonkel Vital: Marcel's uncle, brother of Marcel's father, lives in the countryside; arch-enemy of Moemoe.
- Leo Van Der Neffe: Leon Van Der Neffe's twin brother, works as a prison guard.

== Titles ==
Cover to Kunst en Vliegwerk (1998), the 79th album of the then Kiekeboe series

1. De Wollebollen
2. De duivelse driehoek
3. De dorpstiran van Boeloe Boeloe
4. De onthoofde sfinx
5. Tegen de sterren op
6. Kiekeboe in Carré
7. De schat van Mata Hari
8. De Haar-Tisten
9. De zwarte Zonnekoning
10. De doedelzak van Mac Reel
11. Spoken in huis
12. De Trawanten van Spih
13. Kies Kiekeboe
14. Een zakje chips
15. Mysterie op Spell-Deprik
16. Meesterwerken bij de vleet
17. Fanny Girl
18. Bing Bong
19. Geeeeef acht!
20. De Ka-Fhaar
21. De pili-pili pillen
22. De omgekeerde piramide
23. De snor van Kiekeboe
24. De anonieme smulpapen
25. Het plan SStoeffer
26. Album 26
27. De getatoeëerde mossel
28. Over koetjes en kalfjes
29. De zoete regen
30. Het lot van Charlotte
31. Klavertje vier
32. Het edelweissmotief
33. De een zijn dood
34. De zaak Luc Raak
35. Kiekeboeket
36. Het witte bloed
37. Jeanne Darm
38. Prettige feestdagen
39. De fez van Fes
40. Villa Delfia
41. De bende van Moemoe
42. De spray-historie
43. De spookfirma
44. Hotel O
45. Een koud kunstje
46. Konstantinopel in Istanboel
47. De taart
48. Black-out
49. De Medusa-stichting
50. Afgelast wegens ziekte
51. Met de Franse slag
52. De wraak van Dédé
53. De roze Rolls
54. Gedonder om de bliksem
55. Schiet niet op de pianist
56. Het Stokvis-incident
57. Zeg het met bloemen
58. Haaiman
59. De kus van Mona
60. Het gat in de kaas
61. De zes sterren
62. Doorgestoken kaart
63. Moet er nog sneeuw zijn
64. De onweerstaanbare man
65. De comeback van Dédé
66. De hoofdzaak
67. Het geslacht Kinkel
68. Thantomthant
69. Zand erover
70. Witter dan wit
71. King Sacha
72. Het Zipan-project
73. Hoe meer kijkers
74. De wereld volgens Kiekeboe
75. Het idee van Dédé
76. Kiekebanus (this album also belongs to the series of Urbanus)
77. Drempelvrees
78. Havana Gilla
79. Kunst en vliegwerk
80. De babyvampier
81. Blond en blauw
82. De aqua-rel
83. Lang zullen ze leven
84. Het lijk had gelijk
85. In het spoor van Dédé
86. Misstoestanden
87. De Simstones
88. De hoed van Robin
89. De S van Pion
90. Black e-mail
91. De affaire Chichi
92. De Heeren van Scheurbuyck
93. In tweevoud
94. Taxi Comitée
95. Alles kitsch
96. De Incabouter
97. Kielekiele Boe
98. Verkeerd verbonden
99. Mona, de musical
100. 99 Plus
101. In vuur en vlam
102. De potloodmummie
103. Heil Bod
104. De Himbagodin
105. Het Boerka Complot
106. Vrolijke vrolijke vrienden
107. Tiznoland
108. De DT fout
109. Een echte Vitalko
110. Baas boven baas
111. Dédé bij nacht
112. En in kwade dagen
113. De wokchinees
114. Bij verdiensten
115. Het boemerangeffect
116. Boek.Bv
117. Drie bollen met slagroom
118. Kort en bondig
119. Geld terug
120. Joyo De Eerste
121. De Kangoeroeclub
122. Doodeenvoudig / Eenvoudig dood
123. Vluchtmisdrijf
124. Stinkend rijk
125. Vrouwen komen van Mars (originally: En seks natuurlijk)
126. Tienduizend dagen
127. De Pepermunten
128. Nood in Macadamia
129. Grof Wild
130. Het SS-Syndroom
131. Omtrent Oscar
132. Alle Eendjes
133. Een dagje Dédé
134. Schatjes op zolder
135. Code E
136. Schijnheilig bloed
137. Bistro Dodo
138. Geen rook
139. Zonder vuur
140. Bubbelspel
141. De dode brievenbus
142. Tot op de bodem
143. De truken van Defhoor
144. Losse flodders
145. Wie A zegt
146. Alibaberg
147. Gebroken zwart
148. Nepwerk
149. Zo zie je maar
150. K4
151. Dédé en partner
152. Niet van gisteren
153. Achteraf bekeken
154. Iemand moet het doen
155. In troebel water
156. Blauwblauw
157. De butler heeft het gedaan
158. Salami
159. Onvervalst vals
160. Patiënt zero
161. Dood wakker worden
162. Kind van de rekening
163. Loft met zwembad
164. Seizoensfinale

== Special release ==
1. Kiekeboe Down Under

== Rides ==
De Kiekeboes has a simulator ride with set pieces drawn and coloured by Kristof Fagard that is located at Comics Station in Antwerp.The animation from the droptower ride was animated by Kristof Fagard and Tom Metdepenningen.

== See also ==
• Ligne claire
