= De Rode Ridder =

Belgian comic series

- Cover of album 78 by Karel Biddeloo
- Author(s): Willy Vandersteen, Martin Lodewijk, Marc Legendre, Karel Biddeloo, Peter Van Gucht
- Illustrator(s): Willy Vandersteen, Karel Verschuere, Frank Sels, Karel Biddeloo, Marc Legendre, Claus Scholz, Fabio Bono
- Current status/schedule: Running
- Launch date: 1959
- Publisher: Standaard Uitgeverij
- Genre(s): Adventure, Historical comics

De Rode Ridder (The Red Knight) is a Belgian Flemish comic book series set in medieval Europe. It stars the title character Johan, the Red Knight, easily recognizable by his red tunic. It appeared six days a week in the newspaper De Standaard and a few other ones.

== Summary of the story ==
The series are characterized by subseries and stand alone albums (i.e. depicting a story which are not related to any other album as they do not impact the story line or are mentioned in other albums).

The first twelve albums give a general impression of Johan. He mostly wanders around in medieval Flanders as a lonely noble knight. A common theme in these albums is the investigation of believed-to-be supernatural things and events (1:The Broken Sword, 3:The Bog Ghost, #8:The Golden Sickle,#9:The Dragon of Moerdal, #11:The Silver Eagle, #12:The Horn of Horak). Johan investigates these things and comes to the conclusion that these are merely tricks, used to mislead and frighten people. In a few albums he travels around the world (#4:The Pearl of Bagdad (Iraq), #6:The Weapon of Rihei (Japan), #7: The Fall of Angkor (Cambodia). A common theme of these albums is the fascination of Johan for exotic cultures and his strong opposition to slavery. The chronology of the events in the series do not fit the chronology of real world events.

== Evolution of the comic book ==
=== Willy Vandersteen (1–43) ===
The Red Knight was originally conceived by Leopold Vermeiren as the main character in his short stories in 1946. Willy Vandersteen (most famous for his Spike and Suzy series), in cooperation with Leopold Vermeiren and Karel Verschuere, wrote the first comic in 1959. Verschuere was replaced with Frank Sels in 1963. Until Parcifal (album 43), Willy Vandersteen drew and wrote the story.

=== Karel Biddeloo (44–206) ===
In 1966 the comic was declining in popularity, and Willy Vandersteen considered ending it. The remaining fans protested, however, and it was decided to continue the comic, written by Karel Biddeloo, who took the comic less in the direction of 'knightly tales' and more in the direction of fantasy and science fiction and more action, much to the displeasure of Vandersteen. Still, the comic remained popular. In 2004, after the 206th album, Biddeloo died, and was replaced with the team of the Dutch writer Martin Lodewijk and the German artist Claus D. Scholtz.

=== Claus Scholz and Martin Lodewijk (207–235) ===
From the album De Grot van de Beer (The Cave of the Bear, album 207) onwards, the comic book is made by Claus Scholz (artist) and Martin Lodewijk (scenarist). The style of the series was completely revamped, in that the series obtained a more medieval character again, and Scholz has a different drawing style than Biddeloo. Martin Lodewijk wrote stories for De Rode Ridder until 2012, with album 235th being his last.

=== Claus Scholz and Marc Legendre (236-245) ===
While Martin Lodewijk left in 2012, Marc Legendre replaced Martin Lodewijk in 2013 as a new writer for De Rode Ridder. Marc Legendre made his debut with album 238, The Ordeal. Marc and Claus had several works together with 245, The Kidrobbers being their last one.

=== Peter van Gucht (248–249) ===
Peter van Gucht joined De Rode Ridder in 2016, with his first one being 248, The Dragon of Death followed by 249, The Satanic Fruit. After this comic, the whole comic regained an update with comic 250.

=== Marc Legendre and Fabio Bono (250–) ===
Marc Legendre returned at comic 250 with The Chosen One together with Italians Fabio Bono, who became the new drawer for De Rode Ridder after Claus Scholz's retirement and colorist Dimitri Fogolin.

== List of characters ==
=== Johan, De Rode Ridder (Johan, the Red Knight) ===
Main character Johan, illustrated by Fabio Bono

Johan is the main character of the album, appearing in every single album. Johan's character embodies the chivalric ideal. He is brave to the point of intrepid, virtuous, loyal and an expert swordsman. Most of the albums portray him as a travelling knight, owning nothing except his horse and his equipment. Often he will enter a community under threat by evil. This can be mundane (bandits, barbarian tribes or ruthless noblemen) or magical (evil sorcerers, monstrous races or old curses). Sometimes these present straight out fights, while at other times, Johan has to investigate to find his foe. In the end, Johan and the forces of good are usually triumphant.

His travels have brought him far as well. Egypt, South America, China and even outer space have been the background for Johan's heroics. Chronological accuracy is not much of a concern, Johan having encountered King Arthur from the Dark Ages, as well as having fought in the Battle of the Golden Spurs in 1302.

While generally acting as a lonely knight, Johan has - on occasions - settled down. For a while, together with Lancelot, he was one of the Knights of the Round Table serving under King Arthur, until the king's death in De laatste droom (one of Vandersteen's final comics in this series). Later on, King Arthur would be 'revived' by Biddeloo. Also, Johan stayed at the Castle of Horst for a while, which served as his 'birthplace' and changed the meaning of "Rode" completely, as Johan turned out to be a member of the family of the Lords of Rode, which gave his name a dual meaning, the Red Knight and the Rode Knight, as in the Knight from Rode.

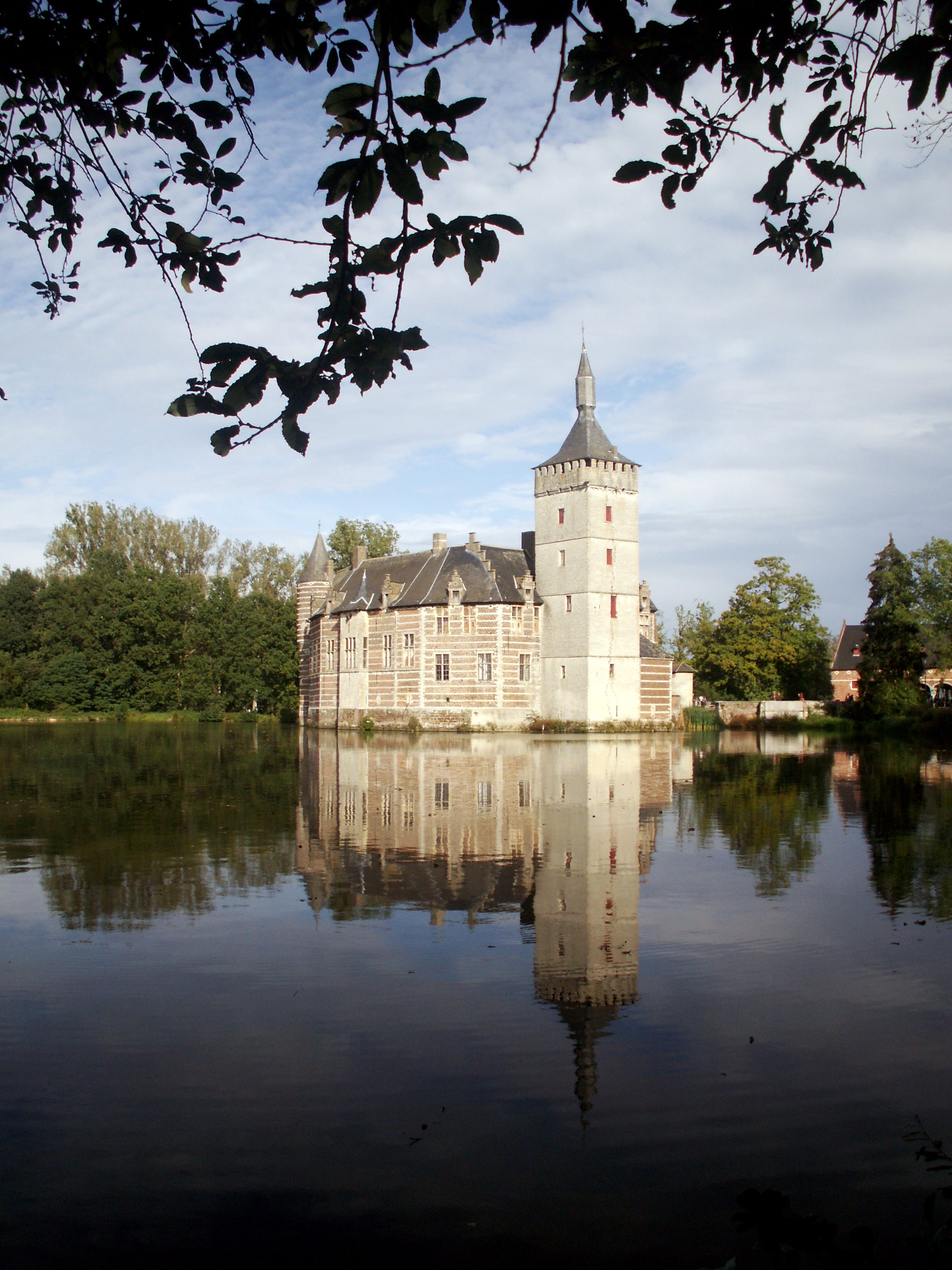
The Castle of Horst

=== Bahaal, Prins der Duisternis (Bahaal, Prince of Darkness) ===
One recurring character is Bahaal, the Prince of Darkness. An evil creature, initially mortal and slain by King Arthur, he returned as a demonic nemesis. Often, Johan's magic-using antagonists are revealed to be working for him. Galaxa, the Faerie of Light is a benevolent creature first seen in De toverspiegel. In this comic, Johan fell in love with her, but because of Bahaal's actions she can no longer stay in the real world for longer than a few moments. Demonia is Bahaal's henchwoman. Beautiful and malicious, she regularly clashes with Johan. Still, some romantic tension has been suggested between the two.

=== Galaxa, Fee van het Licht (Galaxa, Faerie of Light) ===
Another important, recurring character, is Galaxa. She is the polar opposite of Bahaal, and an extremely powerful, good faerie (although it's often been hinted that she is an angel or even a goddess). She has saved Johan's life more than once and is generally considered to be the big good of the series, however due to Bahaal's actions, the time she can spend on earth is rather limited. Galaxa has a wide array of magical powers, including teleportation, shapeshifting, pyrokinesis, aerokinesis and many more. When it comes to a confrontation with Bahaal, she nearly always wins. In one issue, she even does away with him by summoning Satan himself. Her looks were inspired by Austrian actress Senta Berger.

== Honours ==
A camp parody of the Red Knight, the Pink Knight, appeared in the Flemish TV comedy series Buiten De Zone.

Cartoonist Jeroom drew a parody of "De Rode Ridder" called "Ridder Bauknecht".

A statue in Middelkerke, Belgium was erected in 2010.

== Albums ==
Numbers 1–43 are by Willy Vandersteen. Numbers 44–206 by Karel Biddeloo. Numbers 207-249 are by Claus Scholz. And Fabio Bono started the series from number 250. Years stated are for their initial album release.

1. Het gebroken zwaard (1959)
2. De gouden sporen (1960)
3. Het veenspook (1960)
4. De parel van Bagdad (1960)
5. De vrijschutter (1960)
6. Het wapen van Rihei (1961)
7. De val van Angkor (1961)
8. De gouden sikkel (1961)
9. De draak van Moerdal (1961)
10. Storm over Damme (1962)
11. De zilveren adelaar (1962)
12. De hoorn van Horak (1962)
13. De vuurgeest (1963)
14. De galmende kinkhoorns (1963)
15. De zwarte wolvin (1963)
16. Baloch de reus (1963)
17. De zeekoning (1963)
18. De witte tempel (1964)
19. Koning Arthur (1964)
20. Kerwyn de magiër (1964)
21. De wilde horde (1964)
22. De ring van Merlijn (1964)
23. Hugon de hofnar (1965)
24. De zwarte banier (1965)
25. Het rijk van Enid (1965)
26. De kroon van Deirdre (1965)
27. Het graf van Ronjar (1965)
28. De maansteen (1966)
29. De zwaneburcht (1966)
30. Mysterie te Camelot(1966)
31. De groene mummie (1966)
32. Angst over Nevelland (1967)
33. Het beleg van Crowstone (1967)
34. De stenen beelden (1967)
35. Het derde wapen (1967)
36. De zwarte roos (1968)
37. De wilde jacht (1968)
38. De verzonken klok (1968)
39. Noodkreet uit Cambor (1968)
40. De barst in de Ronde Tafel (1969)
41. De laatste droom (1969)
42. Het testament (1969)
43. Parcifal (1969)
44. Drie huurlingen (1969)
45. De hamer van Thor (1970)
46. De Lorelei (1970)
47. De weerwolf (1970)
48. De voorspelling (1970)
49. Met masker en zwaard (1971)
50. De terugkeer (1971)
51. Excalibur (1971)
52. De watermolen (1971)
53. De samoeraï (1971)
54. De kluizenaar van Ronceval (1972)
55. De koraalburcht (1972)
56. Mandragora (1972)
57. De verboden berg (1972)
58. De toverspiegel (1973)
59. De ijzeren hand (1973)
60. Sidarta (1974)
61. In de schaduw van de Thughs (1974)
62. Het sprekende zwaard (1974)
63. De Walkure (1974)
64. Het dodenschip (1974)
65. Het adelaarsnest (1975)
66. Het nimfenwoud (1975)
67. De verrader van Yarkand (1975)
68. Het labyrint (1975)
69. De ijsvorstin (1975)
70. De riviergod (1976)
71. De lijfwacht (1976)
72. De ster van het oosten (1976)
73. De Moloch (1976)
74. De vete (1976)
75. De hellebron (1977)
76. De barbaar (1977)
77. De galeislaaf (1977)
78. Het verloren legioen (1977)
79. De banneling (1977)
80. De schildknaap (1978)
81. De vluchtelingen (1978)
82. Karpax de stalen man (1978)
83. Het spook (1978)
84. De duistere bondgenoot (1979)
85. De zwarte cobra (1979)
86. De Duivelszee (1979)
87. De beelden van Djomaz (1979)
88. Het oog van Toth (1979)
89. De ontvoering (1980)
90. Het dievengilde (1980)
91. Het grote geheim (1980)
92. Zygmud en de beren van Kragero (1980)
93. Nevelsteen (1980)
94. Xanador (1981)
95. Heerser der diepten (1981)
96. De dame van de poorten (1981)
97. De vesting (1981)
98. Het bronzen gevaar (1982)
99. De gijzelaars (1982)
100. De vervloekte stad (1982)
101. De scharlaken brigade (1982)
102. De maagdenburcht (1983)
103. De gezellen van Nimrod (1983)
104. De monsterman (1983)
105. De bewaker (1983)
106. De levende doden (1983)
107. De Troglods (1984)
108. De overlevenden (1984)
109. De leeuw van Vlaanderen (1984)
110. De kraken (1984)
111. Ninja! (1985)
112. De schemerzone (1985)
113. Nirwana (1985)
114. Vrykolakas (1985)
115. Prinses Kin-Lien (1985)
116. In de witte hel (1986)
117. De magische scepter (1986)
118. Gilgamesj (1986)
119. Stille getuigen (1986)
120. Het verdronken land (1987)
121. De zwarte toren (1987)
122. De duinenabdij (1987)
123. Oniria (1987)
124. Necronomicon (1987)
125. Medusa (1988)
126. De duivel van de Lichtenberg (1988)
127. De rode herberg (1988)
128. De boeienkoning (1989)
129. Hydra (1989)
130. De zoon van de draak (1989)
131. De heren van Rode (1989)
132. De slag van Woeringen (1989)
133. De spookkaros (1990)
134. De koningmaker (1990)
135. De witte duisternis (1990)
136. Sol Invictus (1991)
137. De slangegod (1991)
138. Het toernooi (1991)
139. Bloed in de branding (1991)
140. De doodsvlinders (1991)
141. De tuin van Eden (1992)
142. De rattenkoning (1992)
143. Prins der duisternis (1992)
144. De alchemist (1992)
145. De steen der wijzen (1993)
146. De zwarte spiegel (1993)
147. Het levenselixir (1993)
148. De bierkoning (1993)
149. De groene steen (1994)
150. Klingsor (1994)
151. Mysterie op Ararat (1994)
152. Lyonesse (1994)
153. De toverstaf (1995)
154. De slavenmeester (1995)
155. Montsalvat (1995)
156. De graalkoning (1995)
157. Avalon (1996)
158. De duivelstuin (1996)
159. De waterdemon (1996)
160. Het gouden masker (1996)
161. Catacomben (1997)
162. Nemesis (1997)
163. De holle aarde (1997)
164. Reis naar Atlantis (1997)
165. Magiërs van Atlantis (1997)
166. De drakenmeester (1998)
167. Het masker van de draak (1998)
168. Fata Morgana (1998)
169. De maangodin (1998)
170. De woudgeest (1998)
171. De boetelingen (1999)
172. De heksenmeester (1999)
173. Het zwarte teken (1999)
174. De erfgenaam (1999)
175. De naamloze ridder (1999)
176. Het drakengraf (1999)
177. De veldtocht (2000)
178. Het klooster van de dood (2000)
179. De nachtridders (2000)
180. De schat van Dijkenland (2000)
181. De lamp van Aladdin (2000)
182. Wraak van de nachtridders (2000)
183. Het veemgericht (2001)
184. De Berserkers (2001)
185. Het geheim van St. Idesbald (2001)
186. De dodecaëder (2001)
187. Gorgonia (2001)
188. Het putmonster (2001)
189. Nosferatu (2002)
190. De spookvallei (2002)
191. De riddershoeve (2002)
192. Het geheime wapen (2002)
193. De schat van Carthago (2002)
194. De golem (2002)
195. Olavinlinna (2003)
196. Het magische licht (2003)
197. De vloek van de Tupilak (2003)
198. Zimbabwe (2003)
199. Loch Ness (2003)
200. Oude vijanden (2003)
201. Het boze oog (2004)
202. De piraten van Sluis (2004)
203. De vulkaangod (2004)
204. De rode gezant (2004)
205. Het scheepskerkhof (2004)
206. Gog en Magog (2004)
207. De grot van de beer (2005)
208. De blauwe heks (2005)
209. De Judasgraal (2006)
210. Het zwaard van de maagd (2006)
211. Het vuur en de maagd (2006)
212. De zwarte inquisiteur (2006)
213. De tweede terugkeer (2007)
214. De regensteen (2007)
215. De rode kogge (2007)
216. Modgudur (2007)
217. De man zonder verleden (2008)
218. Doodbrenger (2008)
219. De zwaardbroeders (2008)
220. De vedelaar van Sint-Pauwels (2008)
221. De spiegeldemon (2009)
222. De duisterburcht (2009)
223. De sluier van Wuustwezel (2009)
224. Het behouden zwaard (2009)
225. De furiën (2010)
226. Het helse verbond (2010)
227. De ijzeren kroon (2010)
228. De verborgen vesting (2010)
229. De vreemdeling (2011)
230. De amazones (2011)
231. Het koekoeksjong (2011)
232. Duivelsmist (2011)
233. Dokter Faustus (2012)
234. De Elfenring (2012)
235. De witte waan (2012)
236. De zwarte narcis (2012)
237. De wederopstanding (2013)
238. Het godsgericht (2013)
239. De duivelse poppenspeler (2013)
240. De indringers (2013)
241. De zwarte weduwe (2014)
242. De spookkrijgers (2014)
243. De hellevliet (2014)
244. Mensenjacht (2014)
245. De kinderrovers (2015)
246. Dodendans (2015)
247. De klauw (2015)
248. De drakar des doods (2015)
249. De satansvrucht (2016)
250. De uitverkorene (2016)
251. De gevangene (2016)
252. De Hellemond (2016)
253. Het eindeloze eiland (2017)
254. De vuurproef (2017)
255. De heks en Merlijn (2017)
256. Het offer (2017)
257. De onmogelijke opdracht (2018)
258. De hellehond (2018)
259. De slavin (2018)
260. De razende magiër (2018)
261. Het bloedkleed (2019)
262. De laatste waarschuwing (2019)
263. De vervloekte talisman (2019)
264. Een zachte dood (2019)
265. De moordaanslag (2020)
266. Gedoemd (2020)
267. Mordred (2020)
268. De mayameester (2020)
269. Kilyon (2021)
270. Het boek van Thot (2021)
271. De kruisvaarder (2021)
272. De heksenjager (2021)
273. De duivelspenning (2022)
274. De hundeprest (2022)
275. De bastaard (2022)
276. Het einde van alles (2022)
277. Tuan de Barbaar (2023)
278. Het bloedmoeras (2023)
279. De poort van angst (2023)
280. De monstermaker (2023)
281. De vleerkoning (2024)

== See also ==
• Ligne claire • Belgian comics • Franco-Belgian comics
