= Het Belang van Limburg =

Belgium newspaper

- Type: Daily newspaper
- Format: Tabloid
- Owner: Mediahuis
- Editor: Indra Dewitte
- Founded: 1933; 93 years ago
- Headquarters: Hasselt
- Sister newspapers: Gazet van Antwerpen
- Website: www.hbvl.be

Het Belang van Limburg (Dutch pronunciation: [(ɦ)əd bəˈlɑŋ vɑn ˈlɪmbʏr(ə)x]; "The Interest of Limburg") is a Dutch language regional newspaper in Belgium.

== History and profile ==
Het Belang van Limburg was founded in 1933 as a merger of several weekly magazines. The paper is owned and published by Mediahuis. It is published in tabloid format as its sister newspaper Gazet van Antwerpen.

The circulation of Het Belang van Limburg in 2002 was 114,469 copies. Next year it had a circulation of 103,000 copies. It was 102,000 copies in 2004.

The circulation of the paper was 98,352 copies in 2007. Its circulation was 99,443 copies in 2009.
