= Biebel =

Belgian comic series

- Cover Art for Biebel 25 - Opgeruimd
- Author(s): Ikke, Weilie
- Illustrator: Ikke
- Current status/schedule: Discontinued
- Launch date: 1985
- End date: 2002
- Publisher(s): Standaard Uitgeverij, Strip2000
- Genre(s): Humor comics, Gag cartoon

Biebel is the title character of a Flemish satirical comic strip series written by Marc Legendre, under the pseudonym of Ikke. It was created in 1983 for the magazine Robbedoes and was published until 2002.

Biebel successfully appeared in 28 comic albums published by Standaard Uitgeverij, the first of which was released in 1985, and the series were also published in the magazine Suske en Wiske Weekblad.

== Concept ==
Biebel is a bald headed boy with a sarcastic attitude towards life. His best friend Reggie is more happy and carefree and thus an irritation to Biebel. Many Biebel comics are gag-a-day pages, but some are longer stories.

== Characters ==
Biebel, the main character of the series

- Biebel: a hyperkinetic little boy with an egghead. He hates authority and constantly gets into trouble, especially with his parents and teachers.
- Kwist, Biebel's father: an unemployed man who lies in the sofa all day.
- Mother of Biebel: a caring stay-at-home mother who has to put up with the antics of her son and husband unnecessarily.
- Reggie: Biebel's best but oafish friend.
- Freddie, Biebel's talking yucca.
- Teacher Chagrin: teacher at Biebel and Reggie's school. He tries to keep structure and order at school and, as a result, constantly comes into confrontation with Biebel and Reggie.
- The headmaster: the not too bright headmaster of the school
- Professor Klichee: scholar who is enormously absent-minded. Biebel is sometimes the victim of his idiotic inventions.
- Dotje: friend of Biebel and Reggie who often goes out with one of them.
- Leo: a Martian who occasionally lands on Earth and has adventures with Biebel.
- Ikke: the cartoonist himself, who appears in almost every album.
- Boezie: Biebel's archenemy.
- 'Freddie the Yucca: Biebel's yucca, who has the ability to talk.

== Comic Albums ==
1. De Biebelstory
2. De Biebeltochten
3. De Biebelsporten
4. Op Bijna Algemene Aanvraag
5. De Biebelfeesten
6. De Biebelromances
7. Schoolonzin
8. Euh?
9. Kort Geknipt?!
10. Het Avontuurlijke Avontuur
11. Biebel Tegen Ted Vedet
12. Sportkot
13. Snotneuzen In De Sneeuw
14. Om Te Stelen
15. Bangelijk
16. Mafkees
17. Dinges
18. Mislukt
19. Slapmans
20. Parels Voor De Zwijnen
21. Kassa Kassa
22. Soepvlees
23. Een Beetje Feest
24. Virus
25. Opgeruimd
26. Halve Zolen
27. Paladijs-eiland
28. De doos
