= Merho =

Belgian comics artist

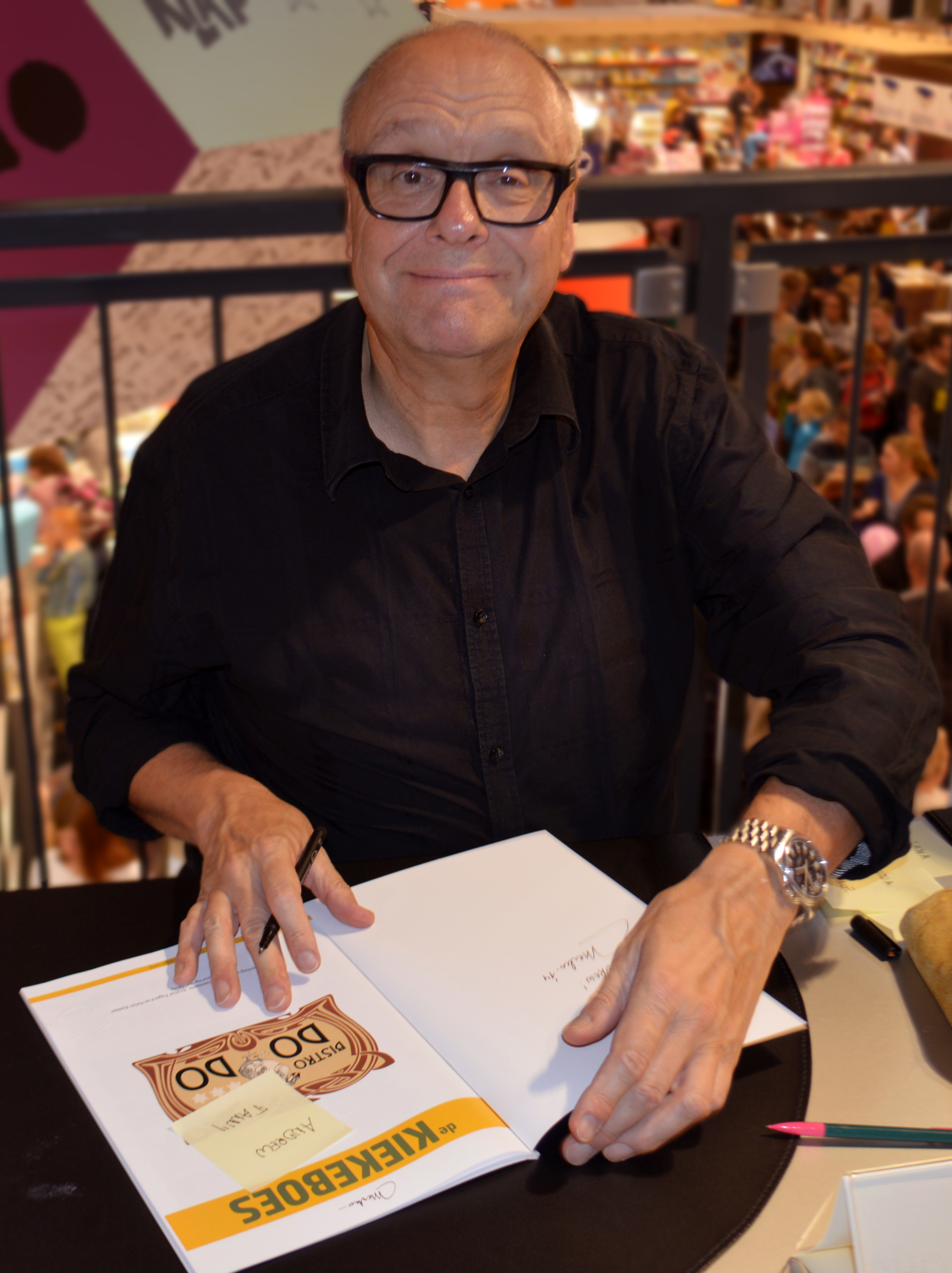
- Born: Robert Merhottein; 24 October 1948 (age 78) Antwerp, Belgium
- Areas: Writer, Artist
- Notable works: Kiekeboe
- Awards: full list

Merho (né Robert Merhottein; 24 October 1948), is a Belgian comic-book writer and artist, best known for creating the comic strip De Kiekeboes.

== Early life ==
Robert Merhottein was born in Antwerp, Belgium in 1948. As a child, he already loved the comics by Marc Sleen and Willy Vandersteen, and wanted to become a comics artist when he grew up. He studied at the Sint-Lukas Art School in Brussels in the 1960s.

== Career ==
Merho's first two comics, Comi en Dakske and Zoz and Zef, were made when he is only a teenager. Afterwards, he worked for five years as an assistant on Jerom and Pats with Studio Vandersteen, but then started his own series, Kiekeboe, in the newspaper Het Laatste Nieuws. Contrary to the other major Flemish newspapers like De Standaard/Het Nieuwsblad (with Spike and Suzy) and Het Volk (with Nero), Het Laatste Nieuws had no local, Flemish comic strip but only published Dutch comics by Marten Toonder or Hans G. Kresse, which left an opportunity for Merho.

Kiekeboe is a typical Flemish comic, about a normal family which unwillingly gets into all kinds of adventures. Filled with humour (mostly puns and misunderstandings), adventure, movie references, and some slight eroticism with the promiscuous teenage daughter Fanny, the comic became an instant success. The first story was serialised in the newspaper starting on 15 February 1977 and continues almost uninterrupted, although the comic has switched from Het Laatste Nieuws to Gazet van Antwerpen.

With more than 100 albums, the Kiekeboe series is one of the three most successful Flemish comics and sells over 100,000 copies with each new album and 1 million albums per year in total. The series does not have any success abroad, with only a short-lived French, German and English translation, and an unsuccessful rebranding for the Dutch market.

== Bibliography ==
Series	Years	Volumes	Editor	Remarks
Zoz en Zef	1965	1	Robert Merhottein	Self published, 1,000 copies only
Comi en Dacske	1966	1	Comidac	Written by René Adriaenssens
Pats / Tits	1976–1977 / 1979–1985	4 / 26	De Standaard	Credited to Studio Vandersteen, the studio started by Willy Vandersteen: the series changed its name in 1978
Kiekeboe	1978–	129	De Standaard	First 45 albums originally published by J. Hoste

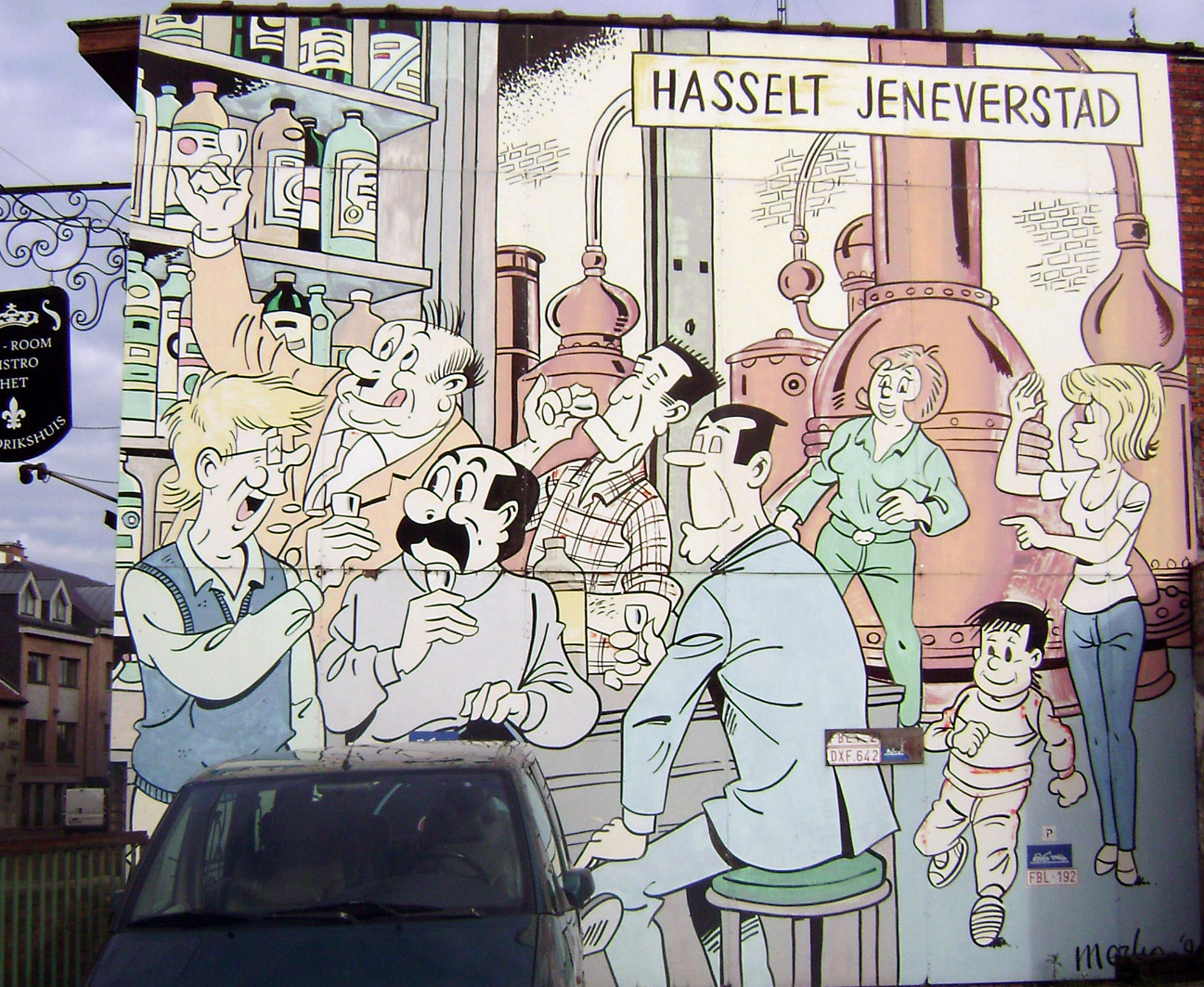
Kiekeboe Wall painting in Hasselt, 1996

== Awards and honours ==
- 1983: Bronzen Adhemar, Turnhout, Belgium
- 1991: Award for Best Flemish Comic of the Flemish chamber of Comics Experts
- 2000: Stamp with Kiekeboe issued by the Belgian Post
- 2002: Honorary citizen of Zoersel, Belgium

== Sources ==
- Matla, Hans: "Stripkatalogus 9: De negende dimensie". Panda, Den Haag, 1998. ISBN 90-6438-111-9
