= Standaard Uitgeverij =

Belgian publishing house

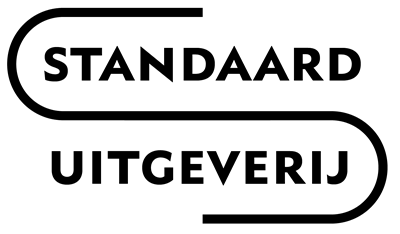
- Native name: Standaard Uitgeverij
- Company type: Naamloze vennootschap (NV)
- Industry: Publishing
- Founded: 1919 (origins: 1918)
- Headquarters: Franklin Rooseveltplaats 12, 2060 Antwerp, Belgium
- Area served: Belgium (Dutch-language market)
- Key people: Kris Hoflack (CEO)
- Products: Books, comics, children's books, translations
- Website: standaarduitgeverij.be

Standaard Uitgeverij is a Belgian publisher, and the leading publisher in the Dutch language market of Flanders.

== History ==
In 1919, the Standaard group was created, mainly consisting of a chain of bookshops (Standaard Boekhandel), a newspaper (De Standaard) and a publishing house, the Standaard Uitgeverij. By the 1930s, the different branches became more and more independent, but only in the 1980s was the group finally disbanded. In 1994, the company was acquired by the Dutch group PCM Algemene Boeken BV.

The company is best known for its comics and popular literature, but also publishes youth literature, non-fiction (mainly cartography, lexicography, and massmarket titles), and multimedia publications. A more purely literary imprint is Manteau, formerly an independent publisher founded by Angèle Manteau now owned by Standaard.

With Harry Potter and Kiekeboe, Standaard Uitgeverij published the four bestselling books in Flanders in 2007. Other popular books were the thrillers by Pieter Aspe and TV tie-ins like the Ketnet Doeboek.

== Major authors and titles ==
=== Comics ===
- Suske en Wiske
- Jommeke
- Kiekeboe
- Nero
- Urbanus
- The Smurfs (translations)
- Biebel

=== Literature ===
- Pieter Aspe (Manteau)

=== Youth literature ===
- Harry Potter (translations)

=== Non fiction ===
- Goedele Liekens
- Standaard Ontdekkingen, Dutch translations of Découvertes Gallimard
