= Gazet van Antwerpen =

Dutch language Belgian newspaper

- Front page on 7 May 2025
- Type: Daily newspaper
- Format: Tabloid
- Owner: Mediahuis
- Editor: Steven Vankerckhoven
- Founded: 1891; 135 years ago
- Headquarters: Antwerp
- Sister newspapers: Het Belang van Limburg
- Website: gva.be

The Gazet van Antwerpen (Dutch pronunciation: [ɣaːˈzɛt fɑn ˈɑntˌʋɛrpə(n)]; lit. 'Gazette of Antwerp'; popularly named De Frut) (Note: Frut is a word in the Antwerpian variety of Dutch which refers to head cheese, especially those of a lower quality.) is a Belgian newspaper in Antwerp and Flanders, published by Mediahuis.

== History and profile ==
Gazet van Antwerpen was established in 1891. Its editor was Jan Baptist Napolitaan Van Os, a Catholic. Shortly afterwards, the company NV De Vlijt took over the newspaper. Circulation rose to 25,000 in 1893 and 40,000 in 1896. Around World War I, its circulation was just short of 100,000.

In 1973, Gazet van Antwerpen reached its peak of 210,000. The NV De Vlijt merged into the Regionale Uitgeversgroep with Concentra Holding in 1996, the publisher of Het Belang van Limburg which became its sister newspaper. Concentra was listed on the Euronext Brussels until 2004.

Gazet van Antwerpen is published in tabloid format as its sister paper, Het Belang van Limburg.

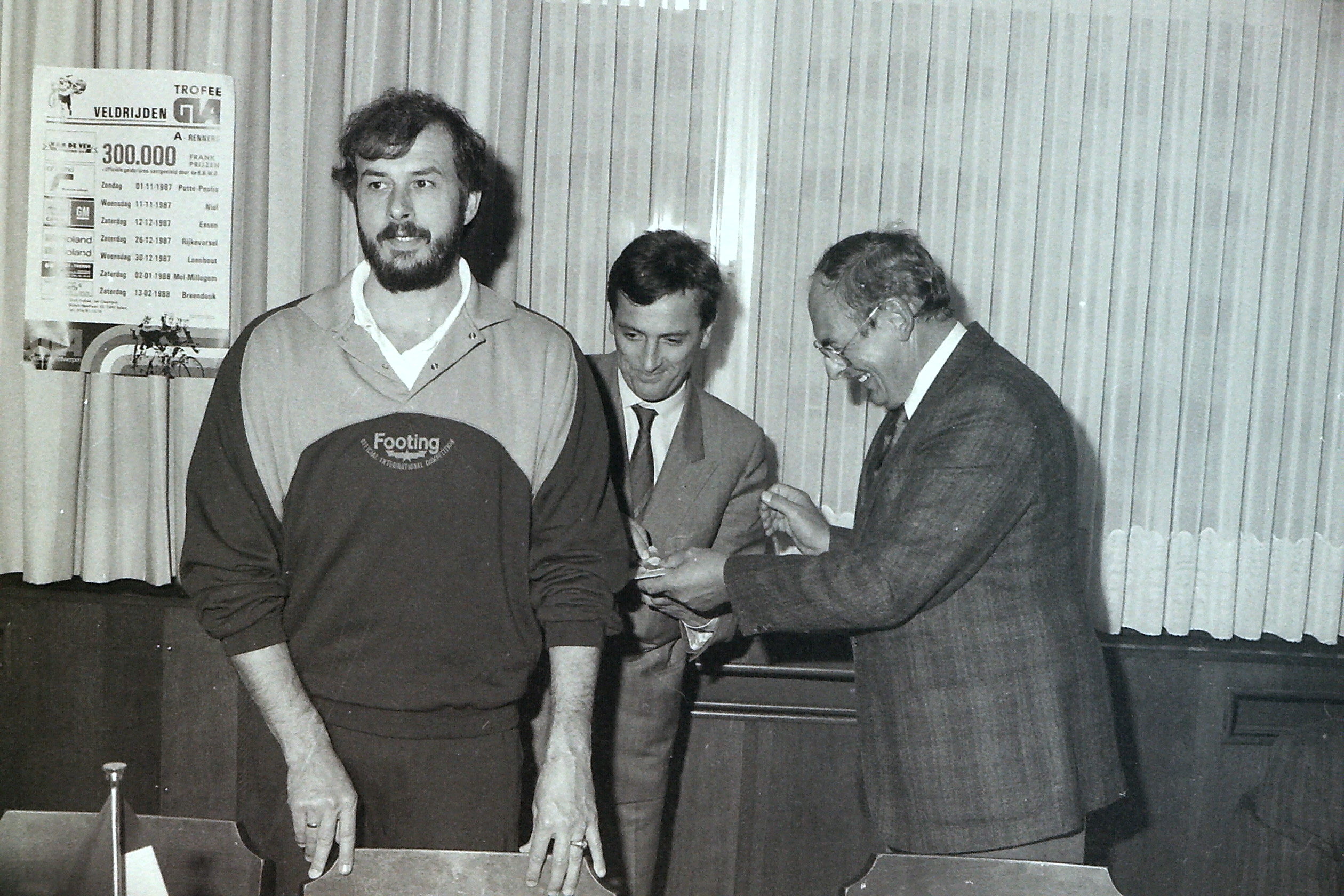
Presentation of the first edition of the Gazet van Antwerpen Trophy, 1987

== Editors in Chief ==
- Jan Baptist Napolitaan Van Os (1891–1893),
- Jan van Kerckhoven (1893–1899)
- Frans Goris (1899–1938)
- Louis Kiebooms (1938–1949)
- Louis Meerts (1949–1985)
- Lou De Clerck (1985–1991)
- Jos Huypens (1991–1996)
- Luc Van Loon (1996–2004)
- Luc Rademakers (2004–2007 )
- Pascal Kerkhove (2007–?)
- Frederik De Swaef (2021-2025)
- Steven Vankerckhoven (2025-present)

== Circulation ==
Year	Copies in Circulation	Notes
2002	140,089	
2004	117,000	
2007	109,472	4th best-selling newspaper in the country
2008	105,151	
2009	103,149	
2010	102,100	
2011	99,150	
