= Marc Legendre =

Belgian cartoonist

Marc Legendre (born 15 April 1956 in Antwerp) is a Bronzen Adhemar-winning Flemish cartoonist and scriptwriter. He is best known for Biebel.
