= Angèle Manteau =

Angèle Georgette Ghislaine Manteau, born in Dinant on 24 January 1911 and died in Aalst on 20 April 2008, was a Belgian publisher. According to the Royal Flemish Academy of Belgium for Science and the Arts, which presented her with an award in 2003, she was "the main Flemish literary editor of the twentieth century" and her publishing house has "undoubtedly left its mark on the history of Flemish literature".

== Biography ==
She was born in Dinant, her father was a textile manufacturer from Lille and her mother was Belgian. In the late 1920s, she studied chemistry at the Université libre de Bruxelles (ULB) (Free University of Brussels in English) for a while. During these years she rented a room in a Dutch couple’s house, Jan Greshoff - journalist, critic and poet - and Aty Brunt, where she learned Dutch and discovered Dutch literature. She worked a few years for the publisher Alexander Stols, and then in 1932 founded the Algemene Importhandel A Manteau. Six years later, with the financial backing of the Dutch publisher Robbert Leopold, she launched her own publishing house: A. Manteau NV.

From 1938 to 1970 the Manteau list included the following Flemish writers: Johan Daisne, Louis Paul Boon, Hubert Lampo, Piet van Aken, Hugo Claus, Jos Vandeloo, Ward Ruyslinck, Jef Geeraerts, Paul Snoek, Karel van de Woestijne, Herman Teirlinck, August Vermeylen. In the 1960s, she launched the Dutch author Jeroen Brouwers, who had worked since 1964 for the publishing house as secretary and then as editor.

In the late 1970s, she left the publishing house, which, since 1965, had joined the Dutch group Van Goor, and worked for Elsevier in Amsterdam. The Manteau editions however continued their activities. In the 1970s and the first half of the 1980s, Julien Weverbergh, who had previously been hired by Angèle Manteau as the head of the Vijfde Meridiaan series of paperback books, headed the company.

In 1986, Angèle Manteau became a member of the Order of Orange-Nassau. In the same year King Baudouin granted her the title of Baroness. In 1998, the former publisher transferred some of her personal literary archives to the National Library of the Netherlands, based in The Hague. Another part was then deposited at the Letterenhuis ("House of Literature") in Antwerp, where the archives of the Manteau editions are kept.

On 13 December 2003, the Royal Flemish Academy of Belgium for Science and the Arts awarded her their Gold Medal.

Angèle Manteau died on 20 April 2008 at the age of 97 in a hospital in Aalst.

== Publications ==
=== Collections of stories ===
- Antwerpse verhalen, Hadewijch, Antwerp, 1983 (ISBN 90-70876-01-9)
- Brusselse verhalen (illustrated by Steven Wilsens), Hadewijch, Antwerp, 1984 (ISBN 90-70876-07-8)
- Vlaamse Kerstverhalen, Hadewijch, Antwerp, 1984 (ISBN 90-70876-05-1)

=== Autobiography ===
- In collaboration with Roger H. Schoemans, Ja, maar mevrouw, deze schrijven Nederlands: Een uitgeefster aan het woord over het boekenvak, Standaard Uitgeverij, Antwerp, 2000 (ISBN 90-02-20996-7)

=== Translations ===
- Emmanuel Bove
  - Mijn vrienden (Mes amis), Uitgeverij de Prom, Baarn, 1981
  - Armand, Uitgeverij de Prom, Baarn, 1983
- Françoise Sagan
  - De geverfde vrouw (La Femme fardée), Uitgeverij de Prom, Baarn, 1982
  - Een roerloos onweer (Un Orage immobile), Uitgeverij de Prom, Baarn, 1983
