= List of Dandy comic strips =

Strips in the British comic magazine

Over the years the British comic magazine The Dandy has had many different strips ranging from humour strips to adventure strips to prose stories. However eventually The Dandy changed from having all these different types of strip to having only humour strips. Prose stories were the first to start being phased out in the 1950s. Adventure strips were phased out in the 1980s.

== The Dandy ==
Strip title	Notes	Original artist	Other notable artists	Start date	End date	Genre
Korky the Cat	Original run from 1937 to 2005. Made sporadic appearances thereafter before returning in 2010.	James Crichton	Charles Grigg, David Gudgeon, Robert Nixon, David Sutherland, Paul Palmer, Dave Windett, Henry Davies, Phil Corbett, Anthony Caluori	1937	2012	Humour
Keyhole Kate	Original run from 1937 to 1955. Later ran from 1989 to 1993, 1998–1999 and reprinted in 2012. Also appeared in Sparky	Allan Morley	Sid Burgon Tom Paterson, Judi Mitchell Anthony Caluori	1937	2012	Humour
Desperate Dan		Dudley Watkins	Peter Davidson, Ken H. Harrison, Anthony Caluori, David Parkins, Trevor Metcalfe, John Geering, Jamie Smart	1937	2013	Humour
Jimmy and his Grockle	First appeared in The Rover under the title 'Jimmy Johnson's Grockle' in 1932. Later appeared in Sparky under the title 'My Grockle and Me'.	James Clark		1937	1946	Humour Adventure
The Tricks of Tommy		Fred Sturrock		1937	1938	Prose
Our Gang	This was a licensed comic strip based on the American series of short films, of the same name. Despite appearing in the comic for almost 10 years, they never appeared in the annuals.	Dudley Watkins		1937	1947	Humour
Red Hoof				1937	1938	Prose
Lost on the Mountain of Fear		Fred Sturrock		1937	1938	Adventure
The Magic Sword				1937	1938	Prose
Barney Boko		John R. Mason		1937	1944	Humour
Hungry Horace	Also appeared in Sparky	Allan Morley		1937	1958	Humour
Freddy the Fearless Fly	Original run from 1937 to 1954. Reappeared in the 2010s. Also appeared in Sparky	Allan Morley	Gordon Bell, Tom Paterson, Phil Corbett	1937	2012	Humour
Magic Mike and his Magic Shop		Sam Fair		1937	1938	Humour
Smarty Grandpa	The strips main character looked identical to Granpaw Broon	Dudley Watkins		1937	1940	Humour
The Two Brave Runaways				1937	1938	Prose
The Daring Deeds of Buck Wilson		Jack Glass		1937	1938	Adventure
Wee Tusky				1937	1943	Prose
Boaster Billy		Fred Sturrock		1937	1938	Humour
Wig and Wam the Skookum Twins		Sam Fair		1937	1939	Humour
Podge		Eric Roberts		1937	1945	Humour
Mugg Muggins		Charlie Gordon		1937	1938	Humour
When the West was Wild				1937	1938	Prose
Invisible Dick	Originated in The Rover in 1922. Later appeared in Sparky	George Ramsbottom		1937	1939	Humour Adventure
Bamboo Town		Charlie Gordon		1937	1944	Humour
Flippy the Sea Serpent		Frank Minnitt		1938	1938	Humour
Teddy Bear		Sam Fair		1938	1938	Humour
Late Again Larry		Fred Sturrock		1938	1938	Humour
Sleepy Gus		Fred Sturrock		1938	1938	Humour
The House that Jack the Joker built		Fred Sturrock		1938	1938	Prose
Bad-Luck Billy		Fred Sturrock		1938	1938	Prose
Buffalo Bill		Jack Glass		1938	1938	Prose
7 Terrible Tasks for the 7th Son		Dudley Watkins		1938	1938	Prose
Handy Clark on the Treasure Trail		Fred Sturrock		1938	1939	Adventure
The Smasher	Unrelated to later and longer running The Smasher which started in 1957.	James Walker		1938	1938	Adventure
Dopey Dinah		Sam Fair		1938	1941	Humour
Simple Simon		Hugh McNeil		1938	1940	Humour
Meddlesome Matty	Original run from 1938 to 1942. Reappeared from 1948 to 1949. Later appeared in Sparky	Sam Fair	Malcolm Judge	1938	1949	Humour
Buster Billy (The Pride of the Regiment)		James Walker		1938	1939	Prose
Wild Young Dirky		Dudley Watkins	James Walker	1938	1946	Prose
The Plucky Little Petersons				1938	1938	Prose
The Sign of the Red Raven		Jack Glass		1938	1938	Prose
The Three Bears		James Clark		1938	1939	Prose
Never, Never Nelson		Jack Glass		1938	1939	Adventure
Whistling Jim		James Walker		1938	1940	Prose
Old King Cole	Title Young King Cole from 1941 to 1942	Fred Sturrock		1938	1944	Prose
Lost in the Land of Bad King John		James Walker		1938	1939	Prose
Straight from the Jungle to Magic Land	Originally appeared as a prose story in 1939. Title changed to 'Lion Boy' for subsequent appearances. Returned as a picture strip from 1949 to 1950. Reappeared as a prose story in 1951. Returned as a picture strip from 1952 to 1953.	Jack Glass		1939	1953	Prose / Adventure
The Man from Laughing Mountain				1939	1939	Prose
Sacred Bull of Batmandu		James Walker		1939	1939	Prose
Jumping Jiminy (The Kangaroo who's always on the hop)		William Ward		1939	1940	Humour
Who's to wear the King's Boots		George Ramsbottom		1939	1939	Prose
The Ugliest Pig in the World	Originally a prose story that ran from 1939 to 1940. Returned in picture strip form under the title 'Rip Snorter – The Ugliest Pig in the World' from 1956 to 1957.	Toby Baines	Eric Roberts	1939	1957	Prose
Jak the Dragon Killer		Jack Glass		1939	1941	Prose
The Man who owns an Ali Baba Cave		Toby Baines		1939	1940	Prose
The Boy with Iron Hands		Fred Sturrock		1939	1940	Adventure
The Black-Striped Sweets that Billy Eats		James Walker		1939	1939	Prose
Our Teacher's a Walrus!	Originally a prose story from 1939 to 1940. Reappeared in picture strip form in 1947.	George Ramsbottom	Dudley Watkins	1939	1947	Prose / Humour Adventure
Drake's Drummer Boy	Originally a prose story that ran from 1939 to 1940. Returned as a picture strip in 1959.	Jack Glass	Victor Peon	1939	1959	Prose / Adventure
Little White Chief of the Cherokees	Originally ran from 1939 to 1940. Reprinted from 1951 to 1952.	George Ramsbottom		1939	1952	Adventure
Addie and Hermy		Sam Fair		1939	1941	Humour
Those Blinking Vaccies Again		Toby Baines		1939	1940	Prose
Wild Man of the Woods		Sam Fair		1940	1940	Humour
Jimmy's Pocket Grandpa		Fred Sturrock		1940	1941	Prose
Swallowed by a Whale		George Ramsbottom		1940	1940	Prose
Hair Oil Hal		John Brown		1940	1941	Humour
Cripple Charlie		Toby Baines		1940	1940	Prose
There's a Curse on the King		Toby Baines		1940	1941	Prose
British Boys and Girls go West				1940	1941	Prose
Wildfire the War Horse		Jack Glass		1940	1941	Adventure
The Daring Deeds of the Sheriff's Little Sister		George Ramsbottom		1940	1940	Prose
The Adventures of Dick Turpin's Kids		George Ramsbottom		1941	1941	Prose
Brave Little Comrade of the Cowardly Lion		James Clark		1941	1941	Prose
Boomerang Burke		Jack Glass		1941	1942	Adventure
Centipede Pete		James Clark		1941	1941	Humour
Jock Macswiper		R. MacGiillivray		1941	1941	Humour
Young Husky				1941	1941	Prose
The Chimney Top Teacher		James Walker		1941	1941	Prose
Grandma Jolly and her Brolly		John R. Mason		1941	1941	Humour
The Twins dare the Redskin Trail		Toby Baines		1941	1941	Prose
Hassan and his Flying Carpet		James Walker		1941	1942	Prose
Blackhawk's Boy		George Ramsbottom		1941	1941	Adventure
Mickey's Magic Book		James Crichton		1941	1948	Humour
Big Starr		Jack Glass		1941	1942	Adventure
Watchful Wally				1942	1942	Humour
Willie Woodpecker		John R. Mason		1942	1944	Humour
Peter Pye		Dudley Watkins		1942	1942	Humour Adventure
The Two Tough Lambs		Toby Baines		1942	1942	Prose
Freddie Flipper's Fighters				1942	1942	Prose
The Magic Box		Toby Baines		1942	1942	Prose
Merry Marvo and his Magic Cigar		Allan Morley		1942	1946	Humour
Hopeful Jimmy Steele		James Walker		1942	1943	Prose
Diver Dick		Robert MacGillivray		1942	1944	Humour
Dick Whittington and his Cat				1942	1943	Humour Adventure
Lost in the Magic Forest				1943	1943	Prose
Tricky Dicky Doyle		James Walker		1943	1943	Prose
King of the Jungle		James Clark		1943	1943	Adventure
The Magic Knockers		Toby Baines		1943	1944	Prose
The Wonderful Wizards		James Walker		1943	1944	Prose
Hansel and Gretel		James Clark		1944	1944	Adventure
The Spitfire Twins				1944	1944	Prose
Inky Poo the Cute Hindoo		John R. Mason		1944	1944	Humour
Captain Cutlass		Charlie Gordon		1944	1945	Humour
The Wandering Wilsons		Jack Prout		1944	1944	Prose
Clumsy Claudie		Leslie Marchant		1944	1944	Humour
The Amazing Mr X		Jack Glass	Dudley Watkins	1944	1945	Adventure
Five Spunky Duncans		Jack Prout		1944	1944	Prose
The Slapdash Circus		Toby Baines		1944	1945	Prose
Charlie Chutney the Humoral Cook		Allan Morley		1944	1947	Humour
Nellie Elephant		Leslie Marchant		1944	1945	Humour
Black Bob	Originally a prose story that ran from 1944 to 1955. From 1956 onwards appeared as picture strips reprinted from The Weekly News.	Jack Prout		1944	1982	Prose / Adventure
Old Ma Murphy the Strong Arm School Ma'am		Allan Morley		1944	1949	Humour
Lazy Larry		Dudley Watkins		1945	1946	Humour
Danny Longlegs		Dudley Watkins		1945	1950	Humour Adventure
Mary's Magic Medicines		Jack Prout		1945	1945	Prose
Happy Go Lucky		James Walker		1945	1945	Prose
Absent-Minded Alfie		Fred Sturrock		1945	1947	Humour
The Cheery Chinks		Charlie Gordon		1945	1946	Humour
The ABC Kids		James Crichton		1946	1946	Prose
The Crusoe Kydds		James Crichton		1946	1946	Prose
Dad's got a Broken Leg		Fred Sturrock		1946	1946	Prose
Julius Sneezer the Sneezing Caesar		Allan Morley		1946	1949	Humour
Dangerous Duff (the Mouse who's Rough and Mighty Tough)		James Crichton		1946	1947	Humour
Whiskery Dick	Similar to The Beano's Hairy Dan except instead of a massive beard this character had a very large moustache.			1946	1948	Humour
Poor Old Nosey		Fred Sturrock		1946	1947	Prose
Dickey Bird (the Boy who knows the Secret Whistle)		James Walker		1947	1947	Prose
Her Majesty's Wizard, Mr G. Whizz		Fred Sturrock		1947	1949	Prose
Smudge	Originally ran from 1947 to 1949. Reprinted from 1955 to 1957 under the title 'Hy Jinks'	Eric Roberts		1947	1957	Humour
Cinder Eddie		Fred Sturrock		1947	1947	Prose
Curly's Two Ton Kitten				1947	1948	Prose
Bouncing Billy Balloon		Charlie Gordon		1948	1948	Humour
Brave Young Black-Hoof		Dudley Watkins		1948	1949	Adventure
Big Bonehead		Jack Glass		1948	1949	Prose
Castor Oil Craddock		Basil Blackaller		1948	1948	Humour
Raggy Muffin – the Dandy Dog		James Crichton		1948	1950	Humour
Plum Macduff (the Highlandman who never gets enough)		Bill Holroyd		1948	1952	Humour
Hotcha the Hottentot		Robert MacGillivray		1948	1949	Humour
The Slave of the Magic Lamp		Fred Sturrock		1948	1949	Prose
The Croaker holds the Clue		Jack Glass		1948	1949	Prose
Wuzzy-Wiz, Magic is his Biz		Bill Holroyd		1949	1955	Humour
Mary's Mighty Uncle	Originally a prose story in 1949. Returned as an adventure strip in 1953	Fred Sturrock	Charles Grigg	1949	1953	Prose / Adventure
Sir Solomon Snoozer		Paddy Brennan		1949	1950	Humour Adventure
Cocky Sue the Cockatoo (she's the Brains of the Pirate Crew)				1949	1951	Humour
Jammy Jimmy Johnson (the Boy with Lucky Hands)		Fred Sturrock		1950	1950	Prose
Quick-Nick, the Lightning Lock-Picker of London	Originally a prose story in 1950. Reappared in picture strip form in 1958. Reprinted from 1973 to 1974.	Jack Glass		1950	1974	Prose / Adventure
Black Magic Bongo the Schoolboy from the Congo		Fred Sturrock		1950	1951	Prose
Barney's Bear	Originally ran from 1950 to 1956. Reprinted from 1964 to 1965.	George Ramsbottom		1950	1965	Humour Adventure
Grandpa Gallant Rides Again!		Fred Sturrock		1950	1950	Prose
Tommy Brown's Slave		Dudley Watkins		1950	1950	Humour Adventure
Rusty	Originally ran from 1950 to 1954. Reprinted from 1960 to 1962.	Paddy Brennan		1950	1962	Humour
Peggy and her Pop's Peg-Leg		James Walker		1950	1950	Prose
Long Tom's Treasure		Jack Glass		1950	1950	Prose
Fergus of the Forty Faces		James Walker		1950	1951	Adventure
The Boy Keeper of the King's Beasts	Originally a prose story that ran from 1950 to 1951. Returned as a picture strip entitled 'Wild Wulff' that ran from 1955 to 1956.	Jack Glass		1950	1956	Prose
Fighting Forkbeard – The Sea Wolf from long ago		Paddy Brennan		1951	1951	Adventure
Noah Lott – He Knows a Lot of Rot		Richard Cox		1951	1954	Humour
Bonanza Bill – The Tricky Trader of Hilly Billy City		Bill Holroyd		1951	1951	Humour Adventure
Shocker Jock – The Boy from the Wonder World	Originally a Prose story that ran from 1951 to 1952. Reappeared in picture strip form from 1954 to 1955.	George Ramsbottom	George Drysdale	1951	1955	Prose / Humour Adventure
Sooty and his Shooter		Charles Grigg		1951	1952	Prose
Willie Willikin's Pobble		Paddy Brennan		1952	1952	Humour Adventure
Hurray for the Rip-Roaring Robinsons		George Drysdale		1952	1952	Prose
Wily Smiley the Jungle Joker		George Martin		1952	1958	Humour
The Trouble of Old Sheriff Saggy Baggs		Fred Sturrock		1952	1952	Prose
The Galloping Glory Boys		Paddy Brennan		1952	1952	Adventure
Mickey from the Moon		Paddy Brennan		1952	1953	Prose
Wee Willie King and his Magic Stings		George Ramsbottom		1952	1953	Prose
Willie the Wicked		Eric Roberts		1953	1953	Humour Adventure
The Tickler Twins on the Redskin Trail		Eric Roberts		1953	1953	Adventure
Tin Lizzie	Originally a prose story that ran from 1953 to 1954. Reappeared in picture strip form from 1955 to 1959.	Jack Prout	Charles Grigg	1953	1959	Prose / Humour Adventure
Cats-Eye Kelly	Originally a prose story in 1953. Returned as an adventure strip in 1959.	Toby Baines	Jack Glass	1953	1959	Prose / Adventure
Westward Ho with Prince Charlie's Gold		Paddy Brennan		1953	1953	Adventure
Bandy Shand and Great Big Bees		George Ramsbottom		1953	1953	Prose
Little Master of the Swooping Monster		Jack Glass		1953	1953	Adventure
Pie Face Pete's Secret Pal		George Ramsbottom		1953	1954	Prose
Great Big Bonzo		Charles Grigg		1953	1954	Humour Adventure
The Streak-O-Light Express		Bill Holroyd		1954	1954	Humour Adventure
Fleetfoot Jack		James Walker		1954	1954	Prose
Young Drake		Dudley Watkins	Paddy Brennan	1954	1954	Adventure
Gobble, Gobble Gertie		Charles Grigg		1954	1954	Humour Adventure
Chinkee, Chinkee Junkee Man				1954	1955	Humour
My Gang by Whacker Wilson		Ron Smith		1954	1955	Humour Adventure
Shaggy Doggy	Originally appeared from 1954 to 1958. Reprinted from 1976 to 1982 under the title 'Waggy, the Shaggy Doggy'	Allan Morley	George Drysdale	1954	1982	Humour
The Wee Black Scallywag		Eric Roberts		1954	1955	Humour Adventure
Winker and Blinker		Fred Sturrock		1954	1954	Prose
Little Angel Face		Ken Reid		1954	1955	Humour
Clanky the Cast Iron Pup	Originally appeared in 1955. Reprinted in 1962.	Charles Grigg		1955	1962	Humour Adventure
Ginger's Super Jeep	Originally a prose story in 1955. Returned as a picture strip from 1958 to 1960.	James Walker	Eric Roberts	1955	1960	Prose / Adventure
Big Bad Wolff	The strips main characters reappeared in 1955 in a strip entitled 'The Lion Heart Logans'.	George Drysdale		1955	1955	Humour Adventure
3 Jonahs in a Whale		Jack Glass		1955	1955	Adventure
Mickey's Tick Tock Men		Paddy Brennan		1955	1955	Humour Adventure
Crackaway Jack	From 1960 to 1961 this strip had the title 'The Crackaway Twins' Originally ran from 1955 to 1961. Reprinted from 1966 to 1967.	Paddy Brennan		1955	1967	Adventure
Millionaire Mike		Charles Grigg		1955	1955	Humour Adventure
Big Beardie		Shamus O'Doherty		1955	1956	Humour
The Tricks of Screwy Driver	Originally ran from 1955 to 1959. Reprinted from 1971 to 1975. New strips started appearing from 1975 to 1984. With the occasional reprint mixed in.	Bill Holroyd		1955	1984	Humour
My Pal Baggy Pants		Ken Hunter		1956	1959	Humour Adventure
Willie's Whizzer Broom		Eric Roberts		1956	1956	Humour Adventure
Just Jimmy		Hugh Morren		1956	1958	Humour
Bing Bang Benny		Ken Reid		1956	1960	Humour
Roly-Poly Joe		Frank MacDiarmid		1956	1958	Humour
Turtle Boy		Paddy Brennan		1956	1956	Adventure
Kipper the Copper		Charles Grigg		1956	1957	Humour Adventure
Corporal Kim – The Boy Mountie		Jack Glass		1956	1956	Adventure
Buster's Battling Beetle		Ken Hunter		1956	1957	Humour Adventure
Jet Carson's School for Racers		George Drysdale		1956	1957	Humour Adventure
Charlie the Chimp		George Ramsbottom	Charles Grigg	1957	1960	Humour Adventure
The Smasher		Hugh Morren	David Gudgeon Brian Walker	1957	2004	Humour
Young Dandy	About a red deer fawn Originally ran from 1957 to 1960. Reprinted in 1974 to 1975.	James Clark		1957	1975	Adventure
Mystery Dick	Originally ran from 1957 to 1958. Reprinted in 1974.	George Ramsbottom		1957	1974	Adventure
Robin Hood		Paddy Brennan		1958	1958	Adventure
Brave Ben Bold		Victor Peon		1958	1958	Adventure
Robinson and his dog Crusoe		George Martin		1958	1960	Humour
The Castaway Kidds	Originally ran from 1958 to 1959. Reprinted from 1974 to 1975.	James Clark		1958	1975	Adventure
Mr Mutt		George Martin		1959	1960	Humour
Circus Boy		Jack Glass		1959	1959	Adventure
Round the World in 80 Days	Based on the novel	Paddy Brennan		1959	1959	Adventure
The Boy with Iron Hands	Unrelated to previous strip with the same title	Bill Holroyd		1959	1961	Adventure
Buffalo Bill's Schooldays		Michael Darling		1960	1960	Adventure
Rodger and his Lodgers	Originally ran from 1960 to 1962. Reprinted from 1972 to 1973.	Shamus O'Doherty		1960	1973	Humour
Dockland Davie	Originally appeared in 1960. Reprinted in 1970.	James Clark		1960	1970	Adventure
Robbie the Bobbie		Jack Prout		1960	1961	Adventure
Jammy Mr Sammy		George Martin		1960	1962	Humour
Dirty Dick	A lot of 1970s strips were reprints.	Eric Roberts	Jimmy Hughes	1960	1978	Humour
Ali Ha-Ha and the Forty Thieves	Originally ran from 1960 to 1963. A second series started in 1986.	Ken Reid	Jerry Swaffield	1960	1988	Humour
Corporal Clott	Originally ran from 1960 to 1975. A second series ran from 1987 to 1988. Reappeared in 2012.	David Law	Jimmy Hughes, Steve Bright, Nigel Auchterlounie	1960	2012	Humour
The Purple Cloud	Originally appeared in 1961. Reprinted from 1968 to 1969.	Charles Grigg		1961	1969	Adventure
Winker Watson	First appeared in the 1961 Dandy Book. Originally ran from 1961 to 2007, being reprinted between 1980 and 1983. Reprinted again during 2012.	Eric Roberts	Terry Bave, Stevie White, Wilbur Dawbarn, Alan Ryan	1961	2012	Humour Adventure
Bingo – the Black Streak		Jack Glass		1961	1962	Humour Adventure
The Hovercar Snatchers		Bill Holroyd		1961	1962	Adventure
Willie Fixit	Originally ran from 1962 to 1963. Reprinted from 1975 to 1977.	Bill Holroyd		1962	1977	Humour Adventure
Sunny Boy – He's a Bright Spark	Originally ran from 1962 to 1965. Reprinted from 1971 to 1973.	George Martin		1962	1973	Humour
Danny Longlegs	Unrelated to 1940s strip with the same name	Jack Glass		1962	1963	Humour Adventure
Blitz Boy		Paddy Brennan		1962	1963	Adventure
My Home Town	Long running feature where readers sent in information about their home towns.	Frank McDiarmid		1962	1970	Feature
Bobcat Boy		Jack Glass		1963	1963	Adventure
Big Head and Thick Head		Ken Reid	Frank McDiarmid	1963	1967	Humour
Rocket Jock		Charles Grigg		1963	1963	Adventure
Joe White and the Seven Dwarfs		Bill Holroyd		1963	1964	Humour Adventure
The Crimson Ball		Jack Glass		1963	1964	Adventure
The Red Wrecker	Originally appeared in 1964. Reprinted in 1978.	Charles Grigg		1964	1978	Adventure
Kit from the Wild Karroo		Jack Glass		1964	1965	Adventure
Brassneck	Originally ran from 1964 to 1973. Reappeared from 1982 to 1984. A third series ran in 1987. A fourth series ran during 2006–2007, which was reprinted during 2012.	Bill Holroyd	Steve Bright, Nick Brennan	1964	2012	Humour Adventure
Moe and Joe and Daddy-O!		Eric Roberts		1965	1965	Humour Adventure
Greedy Pigg	Originally ran from 1965 to 1971. Reappeared for a second run from 1978 to 1984.	George Martin		1965	1984	Humour
The Stinging Swarm		Jack Glass		1965	1965	Adventure
The Umbrella Men		Charles Grigg		1965	1966	Adventure
Hank and his Mini-Tank		Jack Glass		1966	1966	Adventure
South with the Hovercar		Jack Glass		1967	1967	Adventure
Bully Beef and Chips	Originally ran from 1967 to 1997. Reappeared in the 2010s.	Jimmy Hughes	Robert Nixon, Gordon Bell, Sid Burgon Wayne Thompson	1967	2012	Humour
Captain Whoosh		Charles Grigg		1967	1967	Adventure
Butch and his Pooch		Shamus O'Doherty		1967	1968	Humour
Spunky and his Spider		Bill Holroyd		1967	1970	Humour Adventure
Bodger the Bookworm		Shamus O'Doherty		1968	1971	Humour
Gunsmoke Jack		Jack Glass		1968	1968	Adventure
Super Sam		Jack Prout		1968	1968	Humour Adventure
The Island of Monsters		Paddy Brennan		1969	1970	Adventure
The Babes 'N' the Bullies		Trevor Metcalfe		1969	1969	Humour
The Wooden Submarine		Victor Peon		1969	1970	Adventure
My Top Story				1970	1982	Feature
Dinah Mite		Ron Spencer		1970	1971	Humour
Claude Hopper		George Martin		1971	1973	Humour
Whacko!	Originally appeared from 1971 to 1973. Reprinted from 1983 to 1984.	Ron Spencer		1971	1984	Humour
PC Big Ears		John Geering		1971	1973	Humour
Iron Hands		Paddy Brennan		1971	1971	Adventure
My Woozy Dog, Snoozy		Jack Edward Oliver		1971	1971	Humour
The Boy from Lilliput		Paddy Brennan		1972	1972	Adventure
Jack Silver		Bill Holroyd		1973	1981	Adventure
Monkey Bizness	Revival of 'Bamboo Town' (1937–44)	John Geering		1973	1975	Humour
Robin Hood's Schooldays		Ron Spencer		1973	1975	Humour
The Talking Ball		Paddy Brennan		1973	1974	Adventure
Desperate Dawg		George Martin		1973	1986	Humour
Sir Coward De Custard		Ken H. Harrison		1973	1975	Humour
Peter's Pocket Grandpa	Similar in theme to 1940s prose story entitled 'Jimmy's Pocket Grandpa'	Ron Spencer		1975	1983	Humour Adventure
Tom Tin and Buster Brass		Jack Prout		1975	1976	Humour Adventure
Rah-Rah Randall		Ken H. Harrison		1975	1979	Humour
Izzy Skint (You bet he is!)		George Martin		1975	1984	Humour
The Jocks and the Geordies		Jimmy Hughes		1975	1991	Humour
Tom Tum		Keith Reynolds		1978	1986	Humour
Bertie Buncle and his Chemical Uncle		David Mostyn		1978	1982	Humour
Harry and his Hippo	Originally ran from 1979 to 1986. Reappeared from 2011 to 2012.	Ken H. Harrison	Andy Fanton	1979	2012	Humour
Dave the Brave		Paddy Brennan		1979	1980	Humour
Dumb Belle		Jan Sitek		1979	1982	Humour
The Hairy Gang of Robbers		Bill Holroyd		1979	1980	Adventure
Big Chief Itchy Snitch		Bill Holroyd		1982	1983	Humour
Micky the Mouth		David Mostyn		1982	1984	Humour
The Burrd		Ron Spencer	Keith Reynolds	1983	1986	Humour
Dinah Mo		Ron Spencer	Pete Moonie	1983	1996	Humour
Jolly Roger		George Martin		1984	1986	Humour
Ham and Egghead		Steve Bright		1984	1986	Humour
Mitch and his Mummy		Ken H. Harrison	Jerry Swaffield	1984	1986	Humour
Cuddles and Dimples	Originally titled 'Dimples'. After the merger with Hoot in 1986 the character Cuddles originally from Nutty and later Hoot was incorporated into the strip and the title was changed to 'Cuddles and Dimples'. Originally ran until 2010. Reprinted in 2012.	Barrie Appleby	Gordon Bell Nigel Parkinson	1984	2012	Humour
The Domes		John Geering		1984	1985	Humour
Peter Pest	Originally in Nutty	Tom Williams		1985		Humour
Bananaman	Originally in Nutty Currently appears in The Beano	John Geering	Barrie Appleby, Steve Bright, Chris McGhie, Wayne Thompson	1985	2012	Humour
The Snobbs and the Slobbs	Originally in Nutty	John Geering		1985	1987	Humour
Strange Hill	Originally appeared in the 1984 Summer Special.	David Mostyn		1986	2008	Humour
Polar Blair	Originally in Hoot	Robert Nixon		1986	1987	Humour
Spotted Dick	Originally in Hoot	Barrie Appleby	Jerry Swaffield John Aldrich	1986		Humour
Comic Cuts	Originally in Hoot This feature involved a number of four frame strips featuring pre-existing DC Thomson characters.	George Martin		1986	1987	Humour
Ted-Time Tales				1987		Humour
Mutt and Moggy	Very similar to Puss 'n' Boots	John Geering		1987		Humour
Angie the Little Actress		Steve Bright		1988	1988	Humour
Granny	spin-off strip from Cuddles and Dimples, featuring the pair's grandmother	Barrie Appleby		1988		Humour
Li'l Imp		Tom Paterson		1988	1988	Humour
Richard's Snitch		Gordon Bell		1988		Humour
Woofer and Tweeter				1988		Humour
Sammy Supersnail				1988		Humour
Postman Patel	Spin-off of Cuddles and Dimples.	Barrie Appleby	John Aldrich	1988		Humour
George and the Dragon				1988		Humour
James – the World's Worst Schoolboy	Originally ran from 1988 to 1992. Returned in 1997.	Glynn Clarke		1988	1999	Humour
Norbert's Nightmares				1988		Humour
Louden the Mouth				1988		Humour
Watch the Birdie				1988		Humour
Sneaker		Jim Petrie	Nick Brennan	1988	2002	Humour
Young Trainee Santas				1988		Humour
Golden Ol' Days		Ken H. Harrison		1989		Humour
Tristan – the Vicar's Son		Barrie Appleby		1989		Humour
Kylie Phizzog				1990		Humour
Marvo the Wonder Chicken		Syd Kitching	Jim Hansen Nigel Parkinson	1990	2010	Humour
Billy Green and his Sister Jean		Jim Petrie		1990		Humour
The Laughing Planet		Tom Paterson		1990		Humour
Marty's Mouse		Ken H. Harrison		1990		Humour
It's Magic				1990		Humour
Tumba and Rumba – the Mimicking Elephants		Ron Spencer		1990		Humour
Growing Paynes		Trevor Metcalfe		1991	2001	Humour
Molly		David Mostyn		1991	2004	Humour
Smitten	A young boy and his problems with love.	Bill Ritchie		1991	1994	Humour
Barney The Wonder Winger		Brian Walker		1991	1995	Humour
Joe Mince		Gordon Bell		1991	1993	Humour
Sherman Tortoise		John Geering		1991	1994	Humour
King Dom		Trevor Metcalfe		1991	1993	Humour
Wendy's Wicked Stepladder		Keith Robson		1992		Humour
Miss Eve L. Powers		Jimmy Glen		1992	1999	Humour
Hyde and Shriek	Originally ran from 1992 to 1993. Reappeared as reprints in 2004 before changing to new material around a year later.	Tom Paterson	Nick Brennan	1992	2009	Humour
Reg Hog				1992		Humour
Der Daft Dachshunds				1993		Humour
Peter Piper	Character originally appeared in The Magic Comic. Also appeared in Sparky and The Topper	Nick Brennan		1993	1999	Humour
Fiddle O'Diddle		Tom Paterson		1993	2004	Humour
Oliver Twister		Trevor Metcalfe		1993		Humour
Fibba		Gordon Bell		1993		Humour
Potsworth & Co.	Based on a Hanna-Barbera cartoon. Previously appeared in The Beezer and The Topper	Barrie Appleby		1993	1994	Humour
Beryl the Peril	Character first appeared in The Topper in 1953. Had previously appeared in The Beezer and The Topper. Originally ran until 2004. Returned for a second series from 2005 to 2007. A third series ran during 2012. became reprints later that year.	Robert Nixon	Karl Dixon Steve Bright	1993	2012	Humour
Carrot	Short strip revolving around Cuddles and Dimples' pet cat and parrot constantly fighting.	Barrie Appleby		1993		Humour
Jonah	This strip's main character had previously appeared in The Beano	Keith Robson		1993		Humour
Rasper		Tom Paterson		1993	1998	Humour
Claude Cuckooland		Steve Bright		1993		Humour
Puss 'n' Boots	This strips main characters had previously appeared in Sparky	John Geering	Barrie Appleby, Nigel Parkinson, Nigel Auchterlounie,	1993	2010	Humour
First Class		Jimmy Hansen		1993	1998	Humour
Blinky	Previously appeared in The Beezer and The Topper. Younger version of Colonel Blink. Originally ran from 1994 to 2007. Was reprinted sporadically from 2007 to 2010, and again during 2012.	Nick Brennan		1994	2012	Humour
Little Win		Steve Bright		1994	1994	Humour
The Verminator		Jimmy Hansen		1994	1994	Humour
Euro School		Tom Paterson		1994	1995	Humour
Tik and Tak		Gordon Bell		1994	1995	Humour
The Flying Boy				1994		Humour
Herb's History		John Geering		1994		Humour
Brain Duane	Featured in the video game Beanotown Racing	Tom Paterson		1994		Humour
Mad March Hare		Barrie Appleby		1995		Humour
Jock the Rapper	Similar to Watford Gapp in Whizzer and Chips.	Tom Paterson		1995	2001	Humour
Beastie Boy				1995		Humour
Frawg		Nick Brennan		1995		Humour
Brother Grimm				1995		Humour
Spelling Mistaxe				1995		Humour
Little Boots Cassidy		Jimmy Hansen		1995		Humour
Hector Spectre	Based on The Beezer and The Topper strip "Meet Edd: He's a Ghost".	David Mostyn		1996		Humour
Foxy	First appeared in The Topper Previously appeared in The Beezer and The Topper	Evi De Bono		1996		Humour
Cowrin' Wolf		David Mostyn		1996		Humour
Classic Cuts				1997		Humour
The Dandy Treasure Island				1997		Humour
Neighbourhood Wood				1997		Humour
Jak and Todd	The strip was originally titled Jak before changing to Jak and Todd in 2007 after the Dandy went Xtreme. Jak was the Dandy's cover star from 2004 to 2007. Originally ran from 1997 to 1999. Appeared for a second series from 2000 to 2003 as "Jak and Spike" A third series ran from 2004 to 2010, with a one-off reprint in 2012.	Jimmy Hansen	David Sutherland Wayne Thompson	1997	2010	Humour
Stick Maniacs				1997		Humour
Brewster Rooster				1997		Humour
Vain Wayne				1998		Humour
Owen Goal	Originally reprints of 'Cannonball Kid' from Nutty. Later changed to new strips.	Rob Lee	Nigel Parkinson	1998		Humour
P5	Originally ran from 1998 to 2002. Reprinted from 2006 to 2007 under the title 'Class Act'. Similar to The Beano's Bash Street Kids.	Jimmy Hansen		1998	2007	Humour
Bedtime Tales with Bradley Bedsock				1998		Humour
Now Showing				1998		Humour
Buster Crab				1998		Humour
Tweedle Dumb and Tweedle Dumber		Jimmy Hansen		1999		Humour
Antchester				1999		Humour
Polly				1999		Humour
The Pluck of Percy				1999		Humour
Calmsville				1999		Humour
Red Hot Chilli Dogs				1999		Humour
Bodkins Moor				1999		Humour
Walter Gnome – Millenium Gnome				2000		Humour
Bart Brimston		Karl Dixon		2000		Humour
Ridge Rescue				2000		Humour
The Comet				2000		Humour
Phone Bone and Digit Al				2000		Humour
Auntie Clockwise		Wayne Thompson		2000		Humour
Island of Terror				2001		Humour
Ollie Fliptrik		Karl Dixon		2002	2009	Humour
Dallas Ditchwater				2002		Humour
Chester the Alien Chaser				2002		Humour
Animal Asylum				2002		Humour
Silly Moo	Originally ran from 2002 to 2003. Was reprinted in 2012.	Wayne Thompson		2002	2012	Humour
Neville's Island				2002		Humour
The Vulture Club				2002		Humour
The Doyle Family	Originally conceived in the 1970s by Albert Barnes and Tom Paterson as "The Dangerous Dumplings" for a new comic that was later scrapped.	Ken H. Harrison		2002		Humour
The Heavy Metal Yeti				2003		Humour
Pinky's Crackpot Circus	Originally ran during 2003–2004. reprinted in 2012.	Nick Brennan		2003	2012	Humour
Baby Herc				2003		Humour
Bad Max	About a kid with an orange perm and a big jumper with an M on it. Similar to Dennis the Menace.	Steve Bright		2003	2007	Humour
Ozzy Outback				2003		Humour
Wizzo the Wizard				2003		Humour
Make me a Monster				2003		Humour
Agent Dog 2 Zero		Wayne Thompson		2003		Humour
Dandy Days in Beanotown		Steve Bright		2003		Humour
Cats		David Mostyn		2003		Humour
The Nutters	Reprints from Cracker	John Geering		2004	2004	Humour
The Banana Bunch	This strip originally appeared in the first issue of The Beezer back in 1956. Originally ran during 2004. Appeared sporadically during the Xtreme era before returning in 2012.		Nigel Parkinson	2004	2012	Humour
Piggles	Reprints from Hoot	Barrie Appleby		2004		Humour
Pants				2004		Humour
Bad Neighbours				2004		Humour
Edd the Ghost	Reprints from The Beezer and The Topper			2004		Humour
Jacques and Gilles				2004		Humour
Dreadlock Holmes		Jimmy Hansen	Steven White	2004		Humour
Office Hours		Steven White		2004		Humour
Adrian's Wall				2004		Humour
Tootuff	Translated version of Swiss comic strip.	Zep		2005		Humour
My Own Genie	Originally ran from 2005 to 2006. reprinted during 2011–2012.	Jamie Smart		2005	2012	Humour
Reverend Fearnon				2005		Humour
Pig and Cow				2005		Humour
Thor Thumb				2005		Humour
Ten Watt Spot				2005		Humour
Secret Agent Sally				2005		Humour
Flung Poo				2005		Humour
Noah's Ark		Nick Brennan		2006		Humour
Gizmo		Karl Dixon		2006		Humour
Tony and Alberto				2006		Humour
Captain Handsome		Steve Horrocks		2007		Humour
Ted and the Animals	Originally ran during February–July 2007. Reprinted in 2012.	Dan Gaynor		2007	2012	Humour
Space Raoul	Originally ran during 2007. Reprinted in 2012.	Jamie Smart		2007	2012	Humour
Blubba and the Bear	Reprints from Nutty. Originally reprinted during 2007, and again in 2012.			2007	2012	Humour
Mr. Bean	Humour strip based on the animated series.			2007		Humour
The Bogies		Nigel Auchterlounie		2008	2012	Humour
Count Snotula		Duncan Scott		2010		Humour
Harry Hill's Real Life Adventures in TV Land		Nigel Parkinson		2010	2011	Humour
Kid Cops		Lew Stringer		2010		Humour
Little Celebs		Nigel Parkinson		2010	2011	Humour
The Mighty Bork		Wayne Thompson		2010		Humour
Pepperoni Pig		Wayne Thompson		2010		Humour
Postman Prat		Lew Stringer		2010	2012	Humour
Pre-Skool Prime Minister	Originally ran until 2011. A second series began in May 2011 and ended in 2012.	Jamie Smart		2010	2012	Humour
Robot on the Run		Alexander Matthews		2010		Humour
Shaolin Punx		Wayne Thompson		2010		Humour
Clive 5		Nigel Auchterlounie		2010		Humour
George VS Dragon	Originally ran during 2010–2011. A second and third series began in 2011 and 2012 respectively.	Andy Fanton		2010	2012	Humour
Bear Thrills		Phil Corbett		2010		Humour
Graeme Reaper		David Banks		2011		Humour
Mr Meecher the Uncool Teacher	Originally ran during 2011. A second series began later in 2011 up until 2012. returned as a three-panel strip in September 2012.	Wilbur Dawbarn		2011	2012	Humour
Stan Helsing		Nik Holmes		2011		Humour
Boo		Andy Fanton		2011		Humour
Disaster Chef		David Mostyn		2011		Humour
The Arena of Awesome		Jamie Smart		2011		Humour
Yore		The Etherington Brothers		2011		Humour
Clown Wars		Nik Holmes		2011		Humour
Daredevil Dad		Steve Beckett		2011		Humour
Phil's Finger		Chris McGhie		2011		Humour
Tag-Team Tastic		The Etherington Brothers, Warwick Johnson Cadwell		2011		Humour
Farmula One		Wayne Thompson		2011		Humour
Justin Beaver		Stu Munro		2011		Humour
Bone-O		Mike Donaldson		2011		Humour
Space Dogz		Nigel Auchterlounie		2011		Humour
Gleeks		Nigel Auchterlounie		2011		Humour
Sea Dogs		Steve Beckett		2011		Humour
Hysterical History		Karl Dixon		2011		Humour
Fu Schnicken – Kung Fu Chicken		Wayne Thompson		2011		Humour
Tiny's Temper		Stu Munro		2011		Humour
Cheryl's Mole		Chris McGhie		2011		Humour
Nuke Noodle	Originally ran from July 2011 to August 2012. A second series ran from September–December 2012.	Alexander Matthews		2011	2012.	Humour
Rocky's Horror Show		Wilbur Dawbarn		2011		Humour
My Freaky Family		Nigel Auchterlounie		2011		Humour
Frosty		Steve Beckett		2011		Humour
Celeb School		Nigel Parkinson		2012	2012	Humour
Noshy Monsters		Wayne Thompson		2012	2012	Humour
Bad Grandad		Andy Fanton		2012	2012	Humour
Go Ape		Wayne Thompson		2012	2012	Humour
Blundercats		Steve Beckett		2012	2012	Humour
Mega-Lo Maniacs		Jamie Smart		2012	2012	Humour
Superball		Nigel Auchterlounie		2012	2012	Humour
Cavemen in Black		Andy Fanton		2012	2012	Humour
Starsky's Hutch		Gary Boller		2012	2012	Humour
My Dad's a Doofus		Jamie Smart		2012	2012	Humour
The Dark Newt		Lew Stringer		2012	2012	Humour
OlympiKids		Nigel Auchterlounie		2012	2012	Humour
Professor Cheese's Olympic Wheezes		Nick Brennan		2012	2012	Humour
Grrrls		Alexander Matthews		2012	2012	Humour
Rocky Roller, Pest Controller		Andy Fanton		2012	2012	Humour
Secret Agent, Sir		Andy Fanton		2012	2012	Humour

== The Digital Dandy ==
Following the end of the print Dandy, The Dandy moved to the internet and became a digital comic and relaunched from Issue 1. The Digital Dandy then relaunched again in April 2013 starting once again from Issue 1.

Strip Title	Notes	Original Artist	Other Notable Artists	Start date	End date	Genre
Desperate Dan		David Parkins		2013	2013	Humour
Keyhole Kate		Stephen White		2013	2013	Humour Adventure
Bananaman		Andy Janes		2013	2013	Humour
Brassneck		Stephen White		2013	2013	Humour Adventure
Retro Active	Features past DC Thomson superheroes such as Billy the Cat, King Cobra and The Dandy's very own The Amazing Mr. X.	Wayne Thompson		2013	2013	Adventure
Bad Hair Day		Alexander Matthews		2013	2013	Humour
Blinky		Nick Brennan		2013	2013	Humour
The Numskulls	Originally from The Beezer.	Jamie Smart		2013	2013	Humour
Hammie the Hopping Mad Hamster		Graham Howie		2012	2013	Humour
The Laughing Planet		Tom Paterson		2013	2013	Humour
Harry and his Hippo		Dan Gaynor		2013	2013	Humour
Expirin' Uncle Byron		Tom Paterson		2013	2013	
Dreadlock Holmes						

== Cover stars ==
- 1937–1984 Korky the Cat
- 1984–1999 Desperate Dan
- 1999–2000 Cuddles and Dimples
- 2000–2004 Desperate Dan
- 2004–2007 Jak
- 2007–2010 None
- 2010–2011 Harry Hill's Real Life Adventures in TV Land
- 2012–2012 Bananaman

Artists for the stars:

- 1937–1984 James Chrichton/Charles Grigg
- 1984–2004 Ken Harrison
- 2004–2007 Wayne Thompson
- 2007–2010 None
- 2010–2011 Nigel Parkinson
- 2012–2012 Wayne Thompson

== See also ==
- The Dandy
- The Beano
- List of Beano comic strips
- List of Beano comic strips by annual
- The Beezer
- List of Beezer comic strips
- List of Beezer and Topper comic strips
