= List of Beezer and Topper comic strips =

If you are looking for a list of comic strips that appeared in The Beezer see List of Beezer comic strips, for a list that appeared in The Topper see List of Topper comic strips

In 1990 The Beezer merged with The Topper to form a new comic known as the Beezer and Topper. This new comic ended in 1993 after 153 issues. A number of characters from this comic went on to appear in either The Beano or The Dandy. The following is a list of all the strips that appeared in the Beezer and Topper, all numbers refer to issues of Beezer and Topper.

Strip Title	Artist	First Appearance	Last Appearance	Original comic	Notes
Sting	Bob Dewar	1	153	The Beezer	
Geezer	Robert Nixon	1	153	The Beezer	
The Banana Bunch	Tom Paterson	1	153	The Beezer	
The Numskulls	Steve Bright	1	153	The Beezer	Continued in The Beano
The Historiskulls	Steve Bright	1	4		
Blinky	George Martin	1	153	The Beezer	Spin-off of Colonel Blink Later appeared in The Dandy
Adrian the Barbarian	Sid Burgon	1	153	The Beezer	Reprinted in The Beano in 2008 as Olaff the Madlander
Baby Crockett	Bill Ritchie	1	153	The Beezer	
Pop, Dick and Harry	Brian Walker	1	98	The Beezer	
Beryl the Peril	Robert Nixon	1	153	The Topper	Continued in The Dandy
Robohog	John Geering	1	119		
Fred's Bed	Tom Paterson	1	153		Reprinted in The Beano in 2007. Then appeared in new strips in The Beano from 2009 onwards.
Tricky Dicky	John Dallas	1	153	The Topper	Later appeared in The Beano
Send for Kelly	George Martin	1	85	The Topper	Appeared in Dennis the Menace TV series episode "The Day TV Was Banned"
Scaredy Cat	John Dallas	1	152	The Topper	
Crazy Daisy	Gordon Bell	1	119		
Des Troy	Barrie Appleby	1	148		
Little Mo	Bob McGrath	1	73	The Beezer	
Birdbrain	John Geering	2	72		
Gnatasha	Bill Ritchie	3	152		About one of Gnasher (from The Beano)'s daughters
Foxy	Evi De Bono	5	127	The Topper	
History of Art	Jim Petrie	5	22		
Pup Parade	Gordon Bell	12	120	The Beano, later The Topper	Later resurrected in The Beano
Wabits	Gordon Bell	17	46	The Beezer	
Fairy Grotto	Barry Glennard	35	147		
Ghost	David Mostyn	35	153		Later retooled into The Dandy character Hector Spectre.
PXQZTKLE	John Geering	35	153		
Baby Blue	John Geering	35	152		
Stormin' Norma	Trevor Metcalfe	42	153		
In the News	Bill Ritchie	58	148		
Beryl's Beaus	Vic Neill	65	69		
Silly Sausage	Gordon Bell	74	153		
Atilla the Hen	Bob Dewar	84	153		
Window Poster	Barrie Appleby	87	92		Continued in The Dandy
Potsworth & Co.	Barrie Appleby	87	153		Continued in The Dandy Based on a Hanna-Barbera cartoon
Rats	Vic Neill	87	153		
Pikassos	Brock	87	152		
Ishara's test of time quiz		87	152		
Julius Beezer	Barry Glennard	103	153		
Sam the Slam	John Geering	106	148		
Over the Fence	Jimmy Hansen	106	153		
Even Steven	Gordon Bell	106	153		
Madverts	Bill Ritchie	117	123		
Grown-ups	David Sutherland	132	138		
Darwin	Bob Dewar	132	137		
Around the universe in eighty minutes	Bob Dewar	138	145		
A cat's guide	David Mostyn	151	153		

== See also ==
- List of Beano comic strips
- List of Beano comic strips by annual
- List of Dandy comic strips
- List of Beezer comic strips
