= List of Topper comic strips =

The Topper was a long running anthology comic which ran from 1953 to 1990. Mergers with two other comics, Buzz and Sparky in 1975 and 1977, respectively, added characters from those comics to The Topper's roster. The Topper eventually merged with another comic The Beezer in 1990 becoming the Beezer and Topper, this new comic featured a number of characters from The Topper and ended in 1993 with a few of the characters going on to appear in two other comics The Beano and The Dandy. The comic included a number of comic strip adaptations of classic novels, mainly the works of H. Rider Haggard and Robert Louis Stevenson.

| Strip Title | Artists | Genre | First Appearance | Last Appearance | Notes |
|---|---|---|---|---|---|
| Beryl the Peril | Davy Law, and later drawn by John Dallas | Comic | 1 | 1963 | Appeared on cover from 1986 to the merge with The Beezer in 1990. Later appeared in The Dandy. |
| Big Fat Boko And His Crafty Crow (Series 1) | Ken Hunter | Adventure | 1 | 30 | |
| Captain Bungle | George Martin | Comic | 1 | 363 | |
| The Fighting Frasers (Series 1) | Bill Holroyd | Adventure | 1 | 99 | |
| Flip Mccoy The Floating Boy (Series 1) | Paddy Brennan | Adventure | 1 | 68 | |
| Foxy | Charles Grigg and later Evi de Bono | Comic | 1 | 1229 | A fox forever trying to steal chickens and forever getting blasted by The Farmer. Later appeared in The Dandy. |
| Fritzi Ritz | | Comic | 1 | 99 | |
| Mickey the Monkey (series 1) | Dudley D. Watkins, later drawn by Vic Neill. | Comic | 1 | 1666 | The original cover star until 1973. |
| Nancy | Ernie Bushmiller | Comic | 1 | 1111 | Reprints of the American comic. |
| Smart Art | George Martin/George Drysdale | Comic | 1 | 470 | |
| Tiny Tim (Series 1) | James Clark | Comic | 1 | 361 | A minute boy who lives and plays amongst insects |
| Treasure Island (Original Series) | Dudley D. Watkins | Adventure | 1 | 30 | |
| Uncle Dan - The Managerie Man | Allan Morley | Comic | 2 | 248 | |
| Kidnapped (Original Series) | | Adventure | 31 | 54 | |
| The Tiger Of Kashgar | | Adventure | 31 | 71 | |
| Robinson Crusoe | | Adventure | 55 | 79 | |
| The Jolly Rogers | Paddy Brennan | Adventure | 69 | 80 | |
| Big Fat Boko And His Crafty Crow (Series 2) | Ken Hunter | Adventure | 72 | 101 | |
| Wild Young Dirky (Series 1) | Dudley D. Watkins | Adventure | 80 | 94 | |
| Coal-Black Jonah (Series 1) | George Ramsbottom | Comic Adventure | 81 | 108 | |
| King Solomon's Mines (First Version) | | Adventure | 95 | 121 | Based on the novel by H. Rider Haggard |
| Ferd'nand | Henning Dahl Mikkelsen | Comic | 100 | 304 | |
| Happy Daze (Series 1) | | Adventure | 100 | 133 | |
| Sir Laughalot (Series 1) | Ken Hunter | Comic Adventure | 102 | 123 | A fantasy knight and his misadventures |
| Lucky Dicky Dolphin (Series 1) | | Adventure | 109 | 128 | |
| Wild Young Dirky (Series 2) | | Adventure | 122 | 132 | |
| Ali Baba And The Forty Thieves | | Adventure | 124 | 130 | |
| Billy Boomerang | | Adventure | 129 | 144 | |
| Jimmy's Mighty Midgets (Series 1) | Paddy Brennan | Adventure | 131 | 147 | |
| (The Story Of) Gordon The Gipsy | | Adventure | 133 | 139 | |
| The Fighting Frasers (Series 2) | Bill Holroyd | Adventure | 134 | 196 | |
| (The Story Of) Allan Quatermain (First Version) | | Adventure | 140 | 164 | |
| Big Fat Boko And His Crafty Crow (Series 3) | Ken Hunter | Adventure | 145 | 175 | |
| The Lady Of The Lake | | Adventure | 148 | 158 | |
| Keep-Fit Kitt | | Comic | 159 | 199 | |
| Wild Young Dirky (Series 3) | Dudley D. Watkins | Adventure | 159 | 173 | |
| (The Story Of) The Black Arrow | Ron Smith | Adventure | 165 | 192 | |
| Coal-Black Jonah (Series 2) | George Ramsbottom and George Drysdale | Comic Adventure | 174 | 185 | |
| Jed Cooper (First Series) | | Adventure | 176 | 201 | |
| Sir Laughalot (Series 2) | Ken Hunter | Comic Adventure | 186 | 199 | |
| (The Story Of) Captain Blood | Paddy Brennan | Adventure | 193 | 222 | Adaptation of the novel by Rafael Sabatini |
| Happy Daze (Series 2) | | Adventure | 197 | 219 | |
| Dixie's Box O’ Tricks | | Comic | 200 | 214 | |
| Jimmy's Mighty Midgets (Series 2) | Paddy Brennan | Adventure | 215 | 224 | |
| Big Chief Running Chump (Series 1) | | Adventure | 217 | 242 | |
| In The Kingdom Of Zero (First Version) | Bill Holroyd/Ron Smith/Ken Hunter | Adventure | 220 | 258 | |
| Rob Roy | | Adventure | 223 | 250 | |
| Coal-Black Jonah (Series 3) | | Comic Adventure | 225 | 234 | |
| Jed Cooper (Second Series) | | Adventure | 235 | 248 | |
| King Gussie (Series 1) | George Martin | Comic | 235 | 430 | A short strip about a king; like strips such as Desperate Dan, this surreally combined historical and modern day elements. |
| Big Fat Boko (Series 4) | Ken Hunter | Adventure | 243 | 261 | |
| Wulf Of The Arrows (Original Series) | Paddy Brennan | Adventure | 249 | 282 | |
| Oliver Twist | | Adventure | 251 | 280 | |
| Julius Cheeser (Series 1) | George Martin | Comic | 256 | 867 | A short strip about a cat's failures to catch a mouse. |
| Shorty's Little Giant (Series 1) | | Adventure | 259 | 291 | |
| Big Uggy (Series 1) | George Drysdale | Comic | 262 | 469 | A caveman and an anthropomorphic dinosaur friend Dopey |
| White Wolf | | Adventure | 281 | 300 | |
| Dive With The Dolphins (Series 2) | | Adventure | 283 | 313 | |
| Sir Laughalot (Series 3) | Ken Hunter | Comic Adventure | 292 | 311 | |
| Jack-A-Lantern | | Adventure | 301 | 315 | |
| The Bustem Boys On Bunkum Island (Series 1) | Rudolph Dirks | Comic | 305 | 595 | A reprint of the American comic strip The Katzenjammer Kids |
| Unlucky Starrs | | Adventure | 312 | 331 | |
| Thunder Gunn | | Adventure | 314 | 321 | |
| Prester John | | Adventure | 316 | 336 | |
| Wild Young Dirky (Series 4) | | Adventure | 322 | 341 | |
| Happy Daze (Series 3) | | Adventure | 332 | 341 | |
| The Call Of The Wild | | Adventure | 337 | 354 | |
| Big Chief Running Chump (Series 2) | | Adventure | 342 | 358 | |
| Mystery Nick | | Adventure | 342 | 363 | |
| The Dragon's Teeth (Original Series) | | Adventure | 355 | 383 | |
| Journey To The Lost Land (Original Series) | | Adventure | 359 | 383 | |
| Figaro (Series 1) | Tom Bannister | Comic | 364 | 922 | An overweight Mexican bandit and his gang, and his donkey or mule Pedro. |
| Natty Jack (Series 1) | | Comic | 364 | 390 | |
| The Tribe Must Not Die | | Adventure | 364 | 373 | |
| (The Story Of) The Three Musketeers | | Adventure | 374 | 402 | |
| Not Guilty... But Sentenced To Death | | Adventure | 384 | 404 | |
| Tarzan | | Adventure | 384 | 388 | |
| (They've) Got The Wrong Wright | | Comic Adventure | 389 | 396 | |
| (The Story Of) Sinbad The Sailor | | Adventure | 397 | 412 | |
| (Beware Of ) Gum-Drop Gas (Original Series) | | Comic Adventure | 403 | 419 | |
| Back To Zero (Original Version) | Bill Holroyd/Ron Smith/Ken Hunter | Adventure | 405 | 435 | |
| Send for Kelly | George Martin, and later by Sid Burgon | Comic Adventure | 413 | 1963 | A secret agent called Nick Kelly, helped by assistant Cedric for most of the strip's run. Cedric was later replaced by Harry, nephew of Kelly. Survived Beezer merger in 1990. The strip appeared on the cover from the year 1973 to 1975. |
| Stallions Of The Moon | | Adventure | 419 | 439 | |
| Big Fat Boko (Series 5, Reprints) | Ken Hunter | Adventure | 420 | 475 | |
| Danger In The Hills | | Adventure | 436 | 442 | |
| (The Adventures Of) Midshipman Keen | | Adventure | 440 | 470 | |
| The Storms At Sea | | Adventure | 443 | 455 | |
| Castle's In The Air | | Adventure | 456 | 469 | |
| Natty Jack (Series 2) | | Comic | 470 | 475 | |
| Treasure Island (Reprint Series) | Dudley D. Watkins | Adventure | 470 | 499 | |
| The White Witch | Paddy Brennan | Adventure | 471 | 489 | Adaptation of the novel She by H. Rider Haggard |
| Big X - The Bluffer From Planet E (Original Series) | | Comic Adventure | 476 | 495 | |
| The Last Warriors | Ron Smith | Adventure | 490 | 500 | |
| The Big Chief Says Me No Like Um Railroad! (Series 3) | | Adventure | 496 | 507 | |
| Kidnapped (Reprint Series) | | Adventure | 500 | 523 | |
| The Iron Man | | Adventure | 501 | 515 | |
| The Happy Goluks | | Adventure | 508 | 518 | |
| Danger All The Way | | Adventure | 516 | 533 | |
| The Flying Dutchman | | Comic | 519 | 528 | |
| King Gussie (Series 2) | George Martin | Comic | 519 | 920 | |
| Catriona | | Adventure | 524 | 543 | |
| (Tall Tales From) Toad-In-The-Hole | | Comic | 529 | 638 | |
| Young Hammerfist | | Adventure | 534 | 545 | |
| It's A Funny World | | Default | 544 | 571 | |
| Sir Laughalot (Series 4, Reprints) | Ken Hunter | Comic Adventure | 544 | 598 | |
| Flip Mccoy In Australia (Series 2) | Paddy Brennan | Adventure | 546 | 610 | |
| Johnny Rover | | Adventure | 574 | 654 | |
| King Solomon's Mines (Redrawn Version) | | Adventure | 574 | 599 | |
| Desert Island Dick (Series 1) | | Comic | 575 | 1144 | A short strip about a castaway, his pet octopus and his incompetent attempts to summon rescue. The name is a parody of Desert Island Discs on BBC Radio 4. |
| Arty | | Comic | 596 | 617 | |
| The Shocker | | Comic Adventure | 599 | 611 | |
| (The Story Of) Allan Quatermain (Redrawn Version) | | Adventure | 600 | 624 | |
| Island From Nowhere | | Adventure | 611 | 631 | |
| Billy Benn's Den / The Adventures Of Billy Benn | | Adventure | 612 | 677 | |
| The Ups And Downs Of Old Batty (Series 1) | George Martin | Comic | 618 | 696 | |
| Bunyan's Runaways! | | Adventure | 625 | 677 | |
| Hector's Protector | | Adventure | 632 | 652 | |
| Pop And The Animals | | Comic | 639 | 677 | |
| Giants From The Sea | | Adventure | 653 | 677 | |
| Peter Planet | | Adventure | 655 | 703 | |
| Big Fat Boko (Series 6) | Ken Hunter | Adventure | 678 | 784 | |
| Big Uggy (Series 2) | George Drysdale | Comic | 678 | 922 | |
| Rusty's Raiders | | Adventure | 678 | 695 | |
| The Whizzers From Ozz (Series 1) | Paddy Brennan | Adventure | 678 | 779 | Young Willie Walker meets two alien boys, Krik and Krak, who have a spacecraft and alien gadgets. Last strip was January 6, 1968, when Krik and Krak flew back to Ozz again. |
| Three Eggs In A Basket | | Adventure | 696 | 728 | |
| Ali Babble (Series 1) | | Comic Adventure | 697 | 766 | |
| The Plague Of London - 1966 | | Adventure | 704 | 729 | |
| In The Kingdom Of Zero (Redrawn Version) | Bill Holroyd/Ron Smith/Ken Hunter | Adventure | 729 | 766 | |
| Cracker Jackson | | Adventure | 730 | 740 | |
| The Inky Top Imps (Series 1) | | Adventure | 741 | 814 | |
| Circus Of Fear | | Adventure | 767 | 786 | |
| The Whiskery Dicks | | Comic | 767 | 793 | |
| The Bright Boys | | Comic | 768 | 804 | |
| Kidnapped College (Original Series) | | Adventure | 780 | 802 | |
| Andy Ladd | George Martin | Comic | 785 | 921 | A short strip about a resourceful young inventor |
| Little Copy Cat | | Comic | 785 | 867 | |
| Sir Laughalot (Series 5) | Ken Hunter | Comic Adventure | 785 | 814 | |
| Back To Zero (Redrawn Version) | Bill Holroyd/Ron Smith/Ken Hunter | Adventure | 787 | 814 | |
| Old Batty (Series 2) | George Martin | Comic | 794 | 867 | |
| The Dragon's Teeth (Reprint Series) | | Adventure | 803 | 831 | |
| Ali And His Magic Carpet (Series 2) | | Comic Adventure | 805 | 858 | |
| Big Fat Boko (Series 7) | Ken Hunter | Adventure | 815 | 833 | |
| The Sky Shark (Series 1) | | Adventure | 815 | 846 | |
| Tiny | Tom Bannister | Comic | 824 | 1470 | The World's Biggest Dog |
| Oliver's Travels (Original Series) | | Comic | 832 | 838 | |
| Big Chief Running Chump (Series 4) | | Adventure | 834 | 867 | |
| (Beware Of ) Gum-Drop Gas (Reprint Series) | | Comic Adventure | 839 | 855 | |
| Journey To The Lost Land (First Reprint) | | Adventure | 847 | 867 | |
| Jiffy And The Glyphs (Original Series) | George Martin | Comic | 856 | 978 | |
| Have-A-Bash-Billy | | Comic | 859 | 902 | |
| Dopey Joe | | Comic | 868 | 921 | A short strip about an incompetent Indian |
| Splodge (Series 1) | Charles Grigg | Comic | 868 | 1152 | The last of the goblins - around four inches high and invisible to humans, except readers of The Topper, who stole food (Later in The Beano) |
| The Whizzers From Ozz (Series 2) | Paddy Brennan | Adventure | 868 | 941 | |
| Wulf Of The Arrows (Reprint Series) | Paddy Brennan | Adventure | 868 | 901 | |
| Lumbering Jack | | Comic | 902 | 911 | |
| Old Batty Ace Of Space (Series 3) | George Martin | Comic | 903 | 922 | |
| Sir Laughalot (Series 6) | Ken Hunter | Comic Adventure | 912 | 922 | |
| Tales From Bunkum Island (Series 2) | Rudolph Dirks | Comic | 923 | 965 | |
| Jingo The Jester | | Adventure | 923 | 952 | |
| Willy Nilly | | Comic | 923 | 1002 | |
| The Sky Shark (Series 2) | | Adventure | 942 | 954 | |
| Big X - The Bluffer From Planet E (Reprint Series) | | Comic Adventure | 953 | 972 | |
| The Inky Top Imps (Series 2) | | Adventure | 955 | 978 | |
| Sir Laughalot (Series 7) | Ken Hunter | Comic Adventure | 973 | 978 | |
| Super Specs | | Comic | 973 | 1013 | |
| Dicky's Thickies | | Default | 979 | 989 | |
| Thor Thumb | | Comic | 979 | 1074 | |
| The Whizzers From Ozz (Series 3) | Paddy Brennan | Adventure | 979 | 1056 | |
| Figaro (Series 2) | Tom Bannister | Comic | 990 | 1049 | |
| Tales From Moth Eton | | Comic | 991 | 1011 | |
| Danny's Tranny | Ken Hunter | Comic | 1003 | 1737 | A boy and his magical transistor radio - was cover star from 1975 to 1979. |
| Uncle Bob | | Comic | 1012 | 1074 | |
| Dreamboat Bill | | Comic | 1024 | 1066 | |
| Piggy Banks | | Comic | 1050 | 1144 | |
| Happy Daze (Series 4, Reprints) | | Adventure | 1057 | 1074 | |
| The Amazing Peet From Planet K | Paddy Brennan | Adventure | 1075 | 1125 | |
| Top Of The Flops | | Comic | 1075 | 1096 | |
| Whistling Billy | | Comic | 1075 | 1089 | |
| Star Guests | | Comic | 1077 | 1080 | |
| Plum Duffy | | Comic | 1090 | 1109 | |
| Ghastly Manor | Murray Ball | Comic | 1097 | 1266 | A group of ghosts and monsters who live in a run-down manor which is perpetually for sale. Each episode is based on them scaring away a prospective buyer. |
| Morgan The Mountie | | Comic | 1110 | 1144 | |
| Dizzy Doodles (Reprints Of 'Smart Art') | George Martin/George Drysdale | Comic | 1112 | 1144 | |
| The Fighting Frasers (Series 3, Reprints) | Bill Holroyd | Adventure | 1126 | 1138 | |
| The Sky Shark (Series 3) | | Adventure | 1139 | 1144 | |
| Big Fat Flo | Phil Millar | Comic | 1145 | 1187 | Originally ran in Buzz |
| The Deadly Dwarf Of Drayton's Circus | | Default | 1145 | 1152 | |
| Fred The Flop | Tom Lavery/Dave Gudgeon | Comic | 1145 | 1736 | Incompetent, petty criminal whose schemes always fail. Originally from Buzz |
| Jimmy Jinx (and what he thinks) | Ken H. Harrison and Gordon Bell | Comic | 1145 | 1881 | Originally from Buzz later appeared in Fun Size Dandy |
| Nobby | Bob McGrath | Comic | 1145 | 1357 | |
| Sammy's Scribbles | | Comic | 1145 | 1228 | |
| Sleepy Ed | | Comic | 1145 | 1187 | |
| Hoozee The Wotsit | | Comic | 1153 | 1235 | |
| The Whizzers From Ozz (Series 4) | Paddy Brennan | Adventure | 1153 | 1187 | |
| Kidnapped College (Reprint Series) | | Adventure | 1188 | 1210 | |
| Shorty Shambles | | Comic | 1188 | 1235 | |
| Golden Oldies | | Default | 1202 | 1220 | |
| Phone The Crows! | | Comic | 1211 | 1235 | |
| The Wonderful World Of Sidney | | Adventure | 1211 | 1245 | |
| Quiz Kidd | | Default | 1229 | 1260 | |
| Mysterious Monty Mercury | | Adventure | 1236 | 1260 | |
| Tiny Tim (Series 2, Reprints) | James Clark | Comic | 1236 | 1282 | |
| Tricky Dicky | John Dallas | Comic | 1246 | 1963 | Cover star from 1979 until 1986. Moved to the inside for the duration of the comic's life, survived Beezer merge, later appeared in The Beano |
| Big Fat Boko (Series 8, Reprints In ‘Pick Of The Topper') | Ken Hunter | Adventure | 1261 | 1275 | |
| Big Uggy (Series 3, Reprints In ‘Pick Of The Topper') | George Drysdale | Comic | 1261 | 1275 | |
| Flip Mccoy (Series 3, Reprints In ‘Pick Of The Topper') | Paddy Brennan | Adventure | 1261 | 1275 | |
| Julius Cheeser (Series 2, Reprints In ‘Pick Of The Topper') | George Martin | Comic | 1261 | 1275 | |
| Shorty's Little Giant (Series 2, Reprints In ‘Pick Of The Topper') | | Adventure | 1261 | 1275 | |
| Splodge (Series 2, Reprints In ‘Pick Of The Topper') | Charles Grigg | Comic | 1261 | 1275 | |
| Ali's Baba | Malcolm Judge/Vic Neill | Comic | 1276 | 1870 | |
| Hungry Horace | Albert Holroyd/Gordon Bell | Comic | 1276 | 1963 | A kid with the bottomless appetite who is always after food. Originally from Buzz and The Dandy |
| L Cars | | Comic | 1276 | 1357 | |
| Peter Piper | | Comic | 1276 | 1870 | Character with magical pan pipes that could animate objects. Originally appeared in the short lived The Magic Comic and revived in Sparky. |
| Puss An’ Boots | | Comic | 1276 | 1394 | |
| (We Are The) Sparky People | | Comic | 1276 | 1357 | |
| Thingummy Blob | Albert Holroyd | Comic | 1276 | 1439 | |
| Hizz And Hurzz | | Comic | 1283 | 1301 | |
| Happy Harry's Howlers | | Comic | 1300 | 1319 | |
| Autoteach | | Comic | 1302 | 1315 | |
| Janet The Gannet | | Comic | 1316 | 1341 | |
| Desert Island Dick (Series 2) | Tom Bannister | Comic | 1322 | 1353 | |
| Whistler And His Dog | Martin Baxendale/Daniel Phipps | Comic | 1342 | 1373 | |
| Freddie Stare | | Comic | 1358 | 1439 | |
| The Mini Martins | | Adventure | 1358 | 1382 | |
| Tyme Twins | | Comic | 1358 | 1394 | |
| The Whizzers From Ozz (Series 5) | Paddy Brennan | Adventure | 1358 | 1394 | For this series the Whizzers from Ozz appeared on the comic's cover, replacing Danny's Tranny before itself being replaced by Tricky Dicky. |
| Souper Boy | John Dallas | Comic | 1374 | 1737 | A weedy boy who became extremely strong when drinking a special soup, similarly to Popeye |
| Journey To The Lost Land (Second Reprint) | | Adventure | 1383 | 1403 | |
| Big Uggy (Series 4) | | Comic | 1395 | 1417 | |
| The Knights Of The Round Table | | Comic | 1395 | 1439 | |
| Tom And Terry | Bob McGrath | Comic | 1395 | 1872 | from Sparky |
| Klanky | | Adventure | 1404 | 1421 | |
| Oliver's Travels (Reprint Series) | | Comic | 1418 | 1424 | |
| Barney Bulldog | | Comic | 1422 | 1439 | |
| Jiffy And The Glyphs (Reprint Series 1) | George Martin | Comic | 1425 | 1439 | |
| Al Change - He’s His Own Granny | Tom Bannister | Comic | 1440 | 1737 | |
| Fearful Fun Tales | Keith Reynolds | Comic | 1440 | 1580 | |
| Foxy (Series 2, Reprints) | | Comic | 1440 | 1466 | |
| Ghastly Manor (Series 2) | Murray Ball | Comic | 1440 | 1528 | |
| Splodge (Series 3, Reprints) | | Comic | 1440 | 1466 | |
| Splursh The Marsh ‘Un | | Comic | 1440 | 1470 | |
| Jiffy And The Glyphs (Reprint Series 2) | George Martin | Comic | 1467 | 1528 | |
| Timothy Trim | | Comic | 1467 | 1490 | |
| Knut And Bolt | | Comic | 1471 | 1492 | |
| Square Eyes | Malcolm Judge | Comic | 1471 | 1881 | The TV Copycat/ the TV fan |
| Oogly | | Comic | 1491 | 1607 | |
| Battywoman | | Comic | 1493 | 1512 | |
| Fingy | Albert Holroyd | Comic | 1513 | 1666 | |
| The Amazing Peet From Planet K (Reprint Series) | | Adventure | 1529 | 1580 | |
| The Teeny Toppers | Keith Reynolds | Comic | 1581 | 1705 | |
| The Whizzers From Ozz (Series 6) | | Adventure | 1581 | 1631 | |
| Desert Island Dick (Series 3, Reprints) | | Comic | 1582 | 1734 | |
| Whistler And His Dog (Series 2) | Martin Baxendale/Daniel Phipps | Comic | 1608 | 1737 | |
| Baba’s Topper Tale | | Comic | 1632 | 1705 | |
| Brainless | | Comic | 1632 | 1666 | |
| Boppo The Hopeless Hooligan | | Comic | 1667 | 1737 | |
| Old Batty (Series 4, Reprints) | George Martin | Comic Adventure | 1667 | 1705 | |
| Sudsy Malone And Plumb | | Comic | 1667 | 1705 | |
| Jingo The Jester (Reprints) | | Adventure | 1706 | 1728 | |
| Joe The Janny | | Comic | 1706 | 1737 | |
| The Wotsit | | Comic | 1706 | 1737 | |
| Willie Fixit | Robert Nixon | Comic | 1706 | 1881 | |
| Figaro (Series 3) | Tom Bannister | Comic | 1729 | 1808 | |
| King Solomon’s Mines (Reprint Of First Version) | | Adventure | 1729 | 1754 | |
| The Neals On Wheels | | Comic | 1738 | 1818 | |
| Pearl | Gordon Bell | Comic | 1738 | 1881 | |
| Tricky Dicky’s Big Gag! | | Comic | 1738 | 1871 | |
| The Video Kid | Evi De Bono | Comic | 1738 | 1881 | |
| Stan And Oily - the Runaway Robots | Ken Hunter | Comic Adventure | 1755 | 1825 | |
| Smart Art’s Sketchbook (Series 3) | George Martin/George Drysdale | Comic | 1812 | 1870 | |
| The Skratch Squad | | Comic | 1819 | 1875 | |
| Bogeyman | | Comic | 1871 | 1963 | |
| The Ozzies | | Comic | 1871 | 1897 | |
| Spike | | Comic | 1873 | 1962 | |
| Stavros | | Comic | 1873 | 1963 | |
| Pup Parade | Gordon Bell | Comic | 1876 | 1963 | |
| Figaro (Series 4) | | Comic | 1882 | 1963 | |
| Kong | | Comic | 1882 | 1961 | |
| Little Red Rooster / Foxy And Little Rooster | | Comic | 1882 | 1963 | |
| Scaredy Cat | John Dallas | Comic | 1882 | 1963 | |
| Vest Enders | | Comic | 1882 | 1963 | |
| Stupid Cupid | | Comic | 1897 | 1920 | |
| Hoo-Haa Henry | | Comic | 1907 | 1963 | |
| Captain Bungle (Series 2) | George Martin | Comic | 1927 | 1963 | |
| Mickey The Monkey (Series 2) | | Comic | 1927 | 1963 | |
| That’s Rich | | Comic | 1953 | 1963 | |
| What’s Your Problem ? | | Comic | 1953 | 1962 | |

== See also ==
- List of Beano comic strips
- List of Beano comic strips by annual
- List of Dandy comic strips
- List of Beezer comic strips
- List of Beezer and Topper comic strips
