= Ginger (comics) =

British comic strip series

Ginger is a British comic strip series, introduced in the first issue of The Beezer in 1956. The character was the magazine's cover star until 1961, after which Pop, Dick and Harry took over the cover for a few years afterwards, but Ginger returned to the front cover in 1964.

Ginger was a gag-a-day comic strip about a young boy. A typical gag was a one- or two-pager.

He was originally created by Dudley D. Watkins, who drew the strip until his death in 1969. Bob McGrath then took over, drawing it until 1985, when he in turn was succeeded by Jimmy Glen, who drew the strip until the Beezer merged with the Topper. In the later Beezer annuals, he was drawn by Nick Brennan. The character was last seen on the covers of D.C. Thomson's monthly Classics from the Comics, issue # 134 (May 2007) and issue #141 (January 2008), in brand new artwork by Ken H. Harrison.
