= Jack Flash =

British superhero from The Beano

- Adventure story character(s) from The Beano
- Jack Flash from The Beano Book 1959, drawn by Dudley D. Watkins.

Publication information
- Stars in: “Jack Flash the Flying Boy” (1949-1950); “Jack Flash and the Terrible Twins” (1951); “Jack Flash” (1955-1956, 1958); “The Happy-Go-Luckies” (1956); “Jack's the Boy” (1957)
- Author(s): Uncredited
- Illustrator(s): Dudley D. Watkins (1949); Fred Sturrock (1949–1950); Paddy Brennan (1951, 1955–1956); Andy Hutton (1958)
- First appearance: Issue 355 (19 February 1949)
- Last appearance: Issue 3093 (27 October 2001)
- Current status: Discontinued
- Character timeline: Issues 355 – 388, 410 – 429, 453 – 484, 701 – 719, 740 – 749, 789 – 801, 824 – 835, 3093

Also appeared in
- Beano works: The Beano Annual 1951, 1952, 1953, 1954, 1958, 1959, 1960; BeanoMAX
- DC Thomson works: Nutty (1980–1981); Classics from the Comics (2010, issue 171)

Main Character
- Powers: Flight
- Family: Ma Flash (mother); Pa Flash (father); Jane Flash (sister); Jet Flash (brother)

Jack Flash is a British adventure story character published in the British comic magazine The Beano, first appearing in issue 355 with artwork by Dudley Watkins. He featured for almost a decade in five serials (told in eight arcs), following his time as a foreigner to Earth and living in a Cornish village.

== Development ==
Noticing the popularity of American comics in the United Kingdom, The Beano staff had an idea to create a superhero for the magazine in the style of an American superhero. Paper rationing continuing from the Blitz is believed to have prevented an ambitious approach to the plans, but a concept design used artwork of Captain Marvel to represent a "Jack Flash" character flying amongst rockets/missiles.

== Synopsis ==
Jack Flash is the son of a scientist from the planet Mercury, who sneaks away from his family and leaves in his father's rocket. The rocket lands on Earth in Colbay, Cornwall, and Flash uses his power of flight to help and bond with the villagers, usually catching petty criminals and rescuing people from danger.

Flash is fair-haired and wears red long johns and a black leotard with a lightning bolt on the chest. His family can also fly due to tiny wings growing out of their ankles. The characterisation shares similarities with the Roman god Mercury, who could fly using his winged sandals.

== Publication history ==
=== Official serial sagas ===
Until November 1975, The Beano featured adventure text comics in their issues. An uncredited scriptwriter at DC Thomson would write each saga and an assigned artist designed artwork for a scene to fit each of the issue's eleven paragraphs. Jack Flash had six sagas featured in the magazine for nine years between issue 355 and 835, with artwork by Dudley D. Watkins, Fred Sturrock, Paddy Brennan and Andy Hutton, respectively. Despite his "superhero" conventions, Jack Flash's stories had notable "fish out of water" plots, where fighting criminals was occasional within a story arc about him being a helpful boy who happened to have powers.

Flash's first story, “Jack Flash the Flying Boy”, followed Flash's adventures after he arrived in Colbay. Watkins, who also designed many funnies and adventure stories for The Beano, drew the story panels for eleven issues until Sturrock replaced him in issue 367. Sturrock continued illustrating for saga number two the following year, which spanned 20 issues between May and October. Due to family illness, Flash is put in charge of a couple's four children as they leave to care for a relative. Brennan and Hutton both illustrated for the fourth and seventh sagas, respectively, in a series now named “Jack Flash”. From issue 701 to 719, Brennan drew artwork for a story about Flash crash-landing his space ship in "Darkest" Africa, becoming marooned with schoolchildren he travelled with. The seventh (final) saga was a two-month long story about Flash helping a circus look for its escaped lion.

The rest of Flash's stories featured him as joint-lead with others. The third saga (illustrated by Brennan), “Jack Flash and the Terrible Twins” (1951), introduces Flash's family to the series as Flash reunites with his parents and his younger twin siblings: Jane and Jet, the "terrible twins" that cause mischief and chaos that Flash chases after them to fix. Flash also featured in 1956's ten-issue adventure story “The Happy-Go-Luckies” (also illustrated by Brennan), helping the Luckie family move from Kent to Africa.

=== Subsequent cameos and appearances ===
==== The Beano ====
Jack Flash officially left The Beano in 1958, last appearing in issue 835, but made appearances in other Beano media. In the magazine itself, he has not returned since the 1950s, but appeared in a background cameo with Big Eggo and Jonah in a special comic strip titled “Lord Snooty's Day Out” in issue 3093, revealing that formerly-popular characters known by previous generations of readers now live in the Beano retirement home. He has featured in The Beano Annual in both new stories or cameoing in artwork: 1953's edition was another story about his twin siblings causing mischief, his solo features in 1951's, 1952's, 1954's, 1958's, and 1960's editions, a Dudley D Watkins-drawn issue reprint in The Beano Book 1959, and he appeared on the front cover of 1953's edition, the back cover for the 2000 edition, and inside 2019's edition with 254 other characters from The Beano's history.

For spin-off Beano magazines, Flash had his own strip in Beano Summer Special 2003, and appeared in issue 1 of BeanoMAX. Adventure strips initially out of Beano canon for over twenty years meant Flash's stories were reworked as funnies, with BeanoMAX's portrayal making Flash comedic and having crossovers with comic strip characters Billy Whizz and Calamity James.

==== DC Thomson ====
The character was not just confined to the pages of The Beano. Sandy Calder designed stories for Flash in Nutty in 1980 and 1981, and single-issue instalments of Flash and Billy the Cat stories were reprinted to represent The Beano in the Classics from the Comics "Superhero Special" issue in 2010, celebrating superhero characters created by DC Thomson.

== Reception and legacy ==
Audience reception at the time is unavailable to the public, but Jack Flash became one of the longest-running characters in The Beano's adventure story genre, along with Jimmy Watson (eight sagas) and General Jumbo (eight sagas).

A female version of Jack Flash, named Jackie Flash, appeared from issue 347 to 380 in the DC Thomson comic Mandy in 1973. She could fly, could communicate through telepathy, and create force fields.
