= Colonel Blink =

British comic strip by Tom Bannister

Colonel Blink (tagline: "The Short-Sighted Gink") was a British comic strip, drawn by Tom Bannister in November 1958 for the majority of its run, with a few later strips being drawn by Bill Ritchie and Gordon Bell in the same style as Bannister. The strip was published in the comics magazine The Beezer. Denis Gifford in his Encyclopedia of Comic Characters (1987) attributes his creation to "Carmichael." His latest appearances were in the reprint Classics from the Comics series and the associated Beano and Dandy reprint annuals.

== Concept ==
Colonel Blink, whose name was a pun on Colonel Blimp, is a former military colonel who is short-sighted. Many of the one-page gags are about his bluff, no-nonsense treatment of people and situations that are a result of him not being able to see or discern what is going on around him. With the usual comic disregard for foolish internal consistencies, every other story involved his driving down the road in a car that had obviously seen the dawn of the Edwardian era. Although Blink was "known to the police" for various misdemeanours involving often lunatic examples of mistaken identity he was never pulled over for dangerous driving. The charm of the stories lies in the utter lack of malice in Colonel Blink: the madcap adventures are an escalating sequence of disasters based on innocent and often very well-meaning intent.

The character is referred to as a colonel in the strip's title but the character having been in the army is rarely mentioned in the strip itself. However, one strip refers to the character's time in the military and says he became a colonel, but leaves a lot of questions unanswered. In another, it mentions that he had an old war wound that still required attention by a doctor, although whether this was the reason for him leaving the army was never explained.

== Side characters ==
- "Auntie", his ever-patient housekeeper, and who, despite her name was obviously considerably younger than the Colonel
- Rover the dog, who needs to be even more patient as he's often mistaken for lions, bears, rugs or insurance salesmen
- Next-door neighbour Cartright, often the innocent victim of some misunderstanding or other (him being accidentally covered in grass clippings leads Blink to shout approvingly: "Got a monkey to cut the hedge, eh Cartright? Dashed clever idea!")
- Blinky . This character became so popular that he was given his own comic strip in The Beezer and The Dandy.
- Sundry nephews and small boys, as motive forces, Greek chorus and/or astonished by-standers
- A group of rioters who bully the colonel.
- The long-suffering local constabulary.

== Spin-offs ==
After the Beezer merged with The Topper in 1990 the character was reinvented as a short sighted child called Blinky, full name Colin Blinky. This strip was drawn by George Martin and lasted until the closure of the Beezer and Topper in 1993. Following that comic's closure Blinky appeared in The Dandy, redesigned again with comically large pink glasses and this time drawn by Nick Brennan. This version of the character appeared in the Dandy between 1993 and 2011 and after the Dandy's closure he continued to appear in the Dandy annuals. After Blinky started appearing in the Dandy, the Beezer version of Blinky no longer appeared in the annuals and the redesign was reverted to the old Colonel Blink.

== Parodies ==
Colonel Blink has been parodied in Viz as "Colonel Blimp the short-sighted gimp". The character was much the same as his Beezer origin, except that he was a BDSM fan.

== See also ==
- Mr. Magoo, a similar near-sighted character.
