= Splodge (disambiguation) =

Splodge may refer to any of several fictional characters:

- Splodge, the last of the goblins in The Topper
- Splodge, the kangaroo in Blinky Bill
- Splatter and Dodge, sidekicks of Diesel 10 in Thomas and the Magic Railroad
