= Spoofer McGraw =

Spoofer McGraw was a British comic strip, drawn by Gordon Bell, which ran in the British comics magazines Sparky and The Topper from 1968 to 1974.

== Concept ==
Spoofer McGraw is a young boy who, as his name implies, enjoys playing spoofs and pranks on others. He would tell lengthy and completely made up explanations to answer questions sent in by readers of the magazine. His sidekick, Bo, was a young boy who played the straight man to his outlandish comments.
