= Nick Kelly =

Nick Kelly or Nicholas Kelly may refer to:

Historical figures:

- Nick Kelly (cricketer) (born 1993), New Zealand cricket player
- Nick Kelly (musician), Irish musician
- Nicholas Kelly (c. 1823–1849), American instigator of the Charleston Workhouse Slave Rebellion

Fictional characters:

- Nick Kelly, central character of the British comic strip Send for Kelly
