= The Amazing Mr X (comics) =

The Amazing Mr.X

Publication information
- Publisher: DC Thomson
- First appearance: The Dandy #272 (1944)
- Created by: Jack Glass

In-story information
- Alter ego: Les Manners
- Species: Human
- Place of origin: Earth
- Abilities: Enhanced Strength; Flight

The Amazing Mr X was a British comics character who appeared in British children's magazine The Dandy from 1944 to 1945. The character is regarded as Britain's first superhero. The comic was drawn by Jack Glass, and reappeared drawn by Dudley Watkins in the 1962 Dandy Book.

== Publication history ==
The Amazing Mr.X first appeared in issue #244 of The Dandy in 1944. The original series lasted for only 14 issues until 1945. He returned for a one-off adventure in 1962 but that turned out to be the last comic appearance of the character.

== Legacy ==
Entrants of the 2012 Dundee Comics Prize were asked to create Amazing Mr X stories. The winner was cartoonist Steve Marchant with his humorous tale of an 88-year-old Mr X still attempting to fight the good fight.

Publisher DC Thomson brought the character back later that year for the digital relaunch of The Dandy, as part of a new story called Retro Active.
