= School Belle =

British comic series

- Author(s): Keith Reynolds, Tom Paterson
- Current status/schedule: Terminated.
- Launch date: 15 October 1983
- End date: 4 January 2000.
- Genre(s): Gag-a-day, Humor comics, School-themed comics

School Belle was a British comics series, originally published in the first issue of the British comics magazine School Fun on 15 October 1983 until the magazine merged with Buster on 2 June 1984. The strip continued to run in "Buster" until the magazine ceased publication in 2000. The series was written by Keith Reynolds and drawn by Tom Paterson.

== Concept ==
The series centered on a pretty and popular girl named "School Belle", a pun on the terms 'school bell' and belle of the ball, and the attempts of various boys to become her latest boyfriend. A recurring theme was Belle's feud with the unattractive and jealous Grotty Glenda, who would often plot to cause trouble for Belle. Glenda usually enlisted her steady boyfriend, the physically imposing but henpecked Beefy Bernie, to help her; however, he secretly found Belle attractive, and she was often able to distract him from Glenda's schemes by flirting. In 1988 Belle was given a regular boyfriend, public schoolboy Sebastian.

Another theme of the strip was the attempt of various 'nurks' - nerdy and unattractive boys - to gain Belle's attention. The nurks became such a popular feature of the strip that, in 1987, it began featuring a 'Know Your Nurks' breakout box, in which a different comically named nurk (e.g. Cyril Stinkinbottom) would appear in detail alongside an amusing fact about him.

Sometimes the strip would have Belle be on the "losing end", particularly when she got too taken with her personal appearance. One example being where a movie was shooting in Belle's hometown and she found work as an extra. When the leading man is a handsome movie star, Belle (like most other girls) is beside herself. When she arrives on set, she learns the film is actually a horror movie, and she is cast as a vampire, whilst the hunky leading man is a vampire hunter!

In 1990, following comments from readers that Belle was not actually that pretty, she was redrawn in a very different style, with a more modern hairstyle and casual clothing replacing her old-fashioned school uniform. The change was explained in a strip which showed Grotty Glenda dressing up as Belle to pose for the strip's artist, making Belle look bad in the process. Belle's boyfriend Sebastian was also replaced by a more modern counterpart. However, when Buster went fortnightly in the mid-nineties and switched to reprints, the original Belle reappeared.
