= Rupert Besley =

Tourism in Britain and postcard illustrator

Postcard

Rupert Besley is a British illustrator working since 1980, best known for nearly 400 postcard illustrations for J. Arthur Dixon and later John Hinde. He also illustrated cartoon panels for Isle of Wight County Press.

== Bibliography ==
- Besley's Britain ISBN 0285626450
- Scotland for Beginners ISBN 1897784007
- Isle of Skye for Beginners ISBN 1897784767
- Ireland for Beginners, Or, Get Lost in Ireland, 1994
- 'Haud Yer Wheesht!': Your Scottish Granny's Favourite Sayings 1997
- Whaur's Yer Wullie Shakespeare Noo?': Scotland's Millennium Souvenir 1999
- 'Ye Cannae Shove Yer Granny Aff a Bus!': Scots Grandchildren on Their Grannies, 1999
- Dead Jammy!: The Life and Deaths of Glasgow Undertaker Jammy Stewart, 2004
- Scotland for Beginners: 1314 An' A' That 2007
- Terribly English: A Guide for Baffled Natives and Bookish Visitors 2012
- You Know You Are a Dog Lover..., 2013
- The Cannae Sutra: The Scots 'Joy of Sex' 2017
- Awa' an' Bile Yer Heid!: Scottish Curses and Insults, 2017

== See also ==
- Charles Grigg
- Donald McGill
