= Beryl the Peril =

British comic strip character

- The Topper character
- Cover of Beryl the Peril 1971 edition.
- First appearance: The Topper issue 1 (7 February 1953)
- Last appearance: The Dandy issue 3610 (4 December 2012)
- Created by: Davey Law

Beryl the Peril (or simply Beryl) is a fictional character created by David Law, the creator of Dennis the Menace, for issue 1 of The Topper comic (dated 7 February 1953) published by DC Thomson & Co. Limited. Like Dennis, she had black and red apparel, and devilishly tormented her parents and other members of her community. Despite not having quite as many appearances as other DC Thomson characters such as Dennis the Menace or Desperate Dan, Beryl is still considered one of the classic characters which define the popularity of British comics.

== Publication history ==
=== Creation and concept ===
Beryl the Peril first appeared in the first issue of The Topper in 1953. She was created to be a female equivalent to The Beano's Dennis the Menace. Davey Law, her artist and creator, drew inspiration from his daughter, who would often pull faces during her tantrums. The strips were similar in concept to the Dennis the Menace ones in that she would cause chaos through menacing her neighbours, parents and school teachers. In 1958, Beryl was chosen as one of the few of D.C. Thomson's characters to earn an annual all to herself, consisting solely from reprints in past years.

=== Retirement of Law and rise in popularity ===
When Law retired in 1970 her strip was taken over by Bob McGrath and later John Dallas. Her costume changed at some point in the mid-1980s from her red top underneath a black dress to a blue and white striped jumper underneath a red dress. In 1986 she became The Topper's front page star, replacing Tricky Dicky. Her dog Pearl was also introduced shortly before that time, although before that she had a pet turkey called Gobbler. The same year, Robert Nixon took over, a cartoonist who followed in the steps of noted cartoonist Ken Reid, and her overall look became smoother and fuller. She also appeared far less like Dennis the Menace and seemed far more individual as a character. She remained with the comic when The Topper merged with The Beezer in 1990.

=== Move to The Dandy ===
The Beezer and Topper was cancelled in August 1993, and Beryl joined The Dandy comic. Notably, she was the only Beezer and Topper character to transfer to The Dandy as soon as the former comic folded. (The following refugee, Potsworth & Co., did not make the transition until about a month later when The Dandy went full colour, and later strips to make the transition were often retooled in the case of Blinky.)

=== Karl Dixon's Revamp ===
In 1999, the strip was taken over by Ollie Fliptrik artist Karl Dixon as Nixon had to go into semi-retirement due to health problems. It was around this time where the scripts began to take more of a domestic approach, and started to revolve more around Beryl's relationship with her dad. This formula had previously been used on another Dandy character, Dinah Mo, who had been dropped from the comic after the death of her last artist, Pete Moonie. The following year, Beryl's appearance was revamped. She reverted to her black and red clothes and her hairstyle became much more like that of Dennis the Menace – but her pigtails remained. She regained many of her Dennis-influenced traits as well such as the famous "behind the nose" grin and constant scowl. Beryl also attended Dennis the Menace's 50th birthday party, although she was a latecomer so she didn't actually participate in any of the party games or fights prior.

Beryl disappeared for a while after the October 2004 Dandy relaunch. Apart from one appearance in December that year, she returned from issue 3302, dated 12 March 2005.

From The Dandy issue dated 3 March 2006, Steve Bright took over Beryl as artist and her appearance reverted to how she had been drawn by David Law She went through another costume change – a baggy green and red T-shirt with baggy black jeans and trainers. However, she disappeared when The Dandy was relaunched in August 2007. She later re-appeared for four issues, but as reprints from the Nixon era.

=== Pass the Peril ===
In 2010, The Dandy was relaunched, dropping the "Xtreme" from its title and focusing far more on comics. Despite not immediately returning as a strip, Beryl made several cameo appearances in the revamped Dandy. In a segment entitled "What's in Cheryl's hair," a menacing-looking girl with pigtails is seen peeking out. This was labelled Beryl Cole and so is therefore not deemed an official appearance. However, she did make a return digitally via the social networking site Facebook. She was involved in an artist event called "Pass the Peril" in which four different artists were to draw four different strips based on the character and the website. The first was drawn by Steve Beckett and saw Beryl informing her father that her adventures would now continue via Facebook in which she, very much in character, smashed her father's face with a book. The second, drawn by Andy Fanton, shows Beryl mocking how it is fine to "write on a Wall" on Facebook but is considered deviant in real life, revealing that she has been tagging all over Dandy town. The third was illustrated by Nik Holmes and consisted of Beryl contacting old friends through Facebook and featured cameos of past Dandy and Topper characters such as Tricky Dicky, Mickey the Monkey and Smasher. The final strip was drawn by Nigel Auchterlounie and finished with Beryl deciding to un-Like her father on Facebook. This causes a chain effect in which other famous characters from The Dandy – including Korky the Cat, Desperate Dan and Bananaman – also unfriend her father, much to his dismay.

Beryl made her first appearance in the revamped Dandy comic in a Justin Beaver strip. She, alongside Minnie the Minx and Toots, appeared in the comic's title card chasing after Justin. She made yet another appearance in a "Harry and his Hippo" strip, drawn by Andy Fanton. In this strip, she is enjoying the Dandy swimming pool alongside other famous past Dandy characters.

Pass the Peril returned to Facebook mid-2011, this time focusing on Beryl attempting to make her own film. Also, the character returned in the 2012 Dandy Annual, once again drawn by Karl Dixon.

Beryl returned to the main Dandy in February 2012 as reprints from the mid-80s from The Topper. In mid-2012, Beryl came out of reprints and new strips were printed in the comic for 12 weeks by Steve Bright. Later in 2012, Beryl returned once more but this time back in reprints by Steve Bright from 2006–2007. Beryl also appeared in the 75th anniversary special of The Dandy, coming in at No. 8 by Nigel Parkinson in the style of Steve Bright.

== Personality traits ==
Although Beryl is often perceived as a troublemaker similar to Dennis the Menace and Minnie the Minx, her personality changed several times. In the David Law strips, she is quite mischievous but also fun-loving and rather clumsy, whereas she became a more malicious character after John Dallas took over. However, after Robert Nixon took over, she became a much less menacing character, while the stories in the Karl Dixon era largely focused on the relationship between Beryl and her Dad. In the Karl Dixon stories, she shows little respect to her father, often referring to him as 'Beak-Boy' due to his abnormally large nose.

== See also ==
- Dennis the Menace (UK)
- The Topper
- The Dandy
- Minnie the Minx
