= Paddy Brennan =

Irish comics artist

"The Shipwrecked Circus", from The Beano

Paddy Brennan (c. 1930–2000) is an Irish comics artist who worked mainly in the UK, drawing adventure strips for D. C. Thomson & Co. titles. He was a freelancer, working six months of the year in Dublin and six months in London.

His first published work was a strip called "Jeff Collins - Crime Reporter" in the Magno Comic, a one-shot published in 1946 by International Publications in Glasgow. More work for small publishers followed, including in Cartoon Art's Marsman Comics (1948) and Super-Duper (1949) and Martin & Reid's The Rancher and Jolly Western (both 1949) before starting his long association with DC Thomson in 1949, drawing an adaptation of Sir Walter Scott's The Lady in the Lake in the People's Journal, and "Sir Solomon Snoozer" in The Dandy.

In the 1950s he drew mainly adventure strips for The Dandy, The Beano and The Topper, taking over several strips, including "Jimmy and his Magic Patch" and "The Shipwrecked Circus", from Dudley D. Watkins, although he also drew some humour strips, including The Dandy's "Rusty". He was the first artist to draw The Beano's "General Jumbo". From the later 1950s he also drew for girls' comics, including an adaptation of Harriet Beecher Stowe's Uncle Tom's Cabin for Bunty in 1958, and "Sandra of the Secret Ballet" for Judy from 1960. His later work included "Showboat Circus" for The Beezer, "Iron Hand" for Cracker in the late 1970s, and strips for Suzy and Buddy in the 1980s.

== Strips ==
- Ali Baba and the Forty Thieves (People's Journal, The Dandy)
- Crackaway Jack (The Dandy)
- Flip McCoy - the Flying Boy (Topper)
- The Galloping Glory Boys (The Dandy)
- General Jumbo (The Beano)
- Iron Hand (Cracker)
- Jack Flash and the Terrible Twins (The Beano)
- Rusty (The Dandy)
- The Shipwrecked Circus (The Beano)
- The Showboat Circus (Beezer)
- Sinbad the Sailor (The Beano)
- The Whizzers from Ozz (Topper)
