= Send for Kelly =

Comic strip

Send for Kelly was a long running comic strip that first appeared in The Topper, originally drawn by George Martin.

== Synopsis ==
The strip was mainly a parody of spy fiction, with Nick Kelly often solving cases through sheer luck and with lots of comedy involved.

== Characters ==
- Nick Kelly was the main character, a secret agent. He usually wore a red trench coat and a fedora, and drove a bubble car.
- Cedric was his assistant, conservatively dressed and in a bowler hat.
- The Minister of Secret Information a balding man who Nick Kelly reported to.
- Professor Wright-Nitt an eccentric scientist and inventor of gadgets for Kelly to help solve cases.
- Harry Kelly's young nephew who replaced Cedric

== Publication history ==
=== The Topper ===
Send for Kelly first appeared in 1961 in issue 413. From 1973 to 1975 the comic appeared on the front cover. The strip continued in the Topper until the comic's end and continued when the comic merged with The Beezer in 1990.

=== The Beezer and Topper ===
The strip continued in the Beezer and Topper, still drawn by George Martin, under the name Kelly the defective detective, until issue 85 in 1992.

=== Subsequent appearances ===
After the closure of the Beezer and Topper the strip continued to appear occasionally as reprints in Classics from the Comics. The character appeared in animated form in an episode of the 1996 Dennis the Menace and Gnasher cartoon as a show within a show. Nick Kelly and his assistant Cedric also made an appearance in the Dandy Annual 2014, this time drawn by Nigel Auchterlounie.
