= Charles Grigg =

British comic artist

- Born: 23 November 1916 West Midlands, England
- Died: 4 December 2013 (aged 97) U.K.
- Area: Artist
- Notable works: Korky the Cat; Desperate Dan

Charles Grigg more commonly known as Charlie Grigg (23 November 1916 – 4 December 2013) was a British comic artist for DC Thomson. He was the artist of The Dandy cover strip Korky the Cat. He also drew Desperate Dan after the original artist, Dudley Watkins, died. In The Topper comic he drew Splodge, Willy Nilly, Foxy and Shorty Shambles.

Completely self-taught as an artist, Grigg grew up in Langley, Oldbury, West Midlands, in the Black Country.

Steven Grigg said his father was largely unappreciated while he was alive and would have been "very proud" of the honour. A self-taught artist, he never lost his love of drawing even in his later years.

Grigg swiftly became the definitive Korky the Cat artist, when he took over the artistic duties from James Crighton on the cover of The Dandy in the early 1960s. Immediately making Korky a friendlier looking figure, his covers for the weekly, and the Dandy Summer Specials and annuals, were some of the finest pieces of humour art DC Thomson were producing at that time.

DC Thomson chose him to draw Desperate Dan for the specials and annuals following original artist Dudley Watkins' death in 1969.

Grigg was also adept at illustrating "light adventure" stories for the publisher, with his most memorable sixties strips being The Red Wrecker and The Umbrella Men for The Dandy.

When Grigg retired from regular comics work in 1983, he turned his hand to illustrating saucy seaside postcards for Bamforth. These British curiosities were hugely popular decades ago, and could be found on spinner racks outside shops in every seaside resort. However, by the time Grigg entered the field, the popularity of such postcards was in decline. Today, Bamforth saucy postcards are considered a 20th-century collectible (supplanted by holidaymaker's text messages), although some shops do still have old stock.

Suffering from Alzheimer's disease, Grigg died on 4 December 2013 at the age of 97.

== See also ==
- Rupert Besley
