= General Jumbo =

Comic character from The Beano

- Adventure story character(s) from The Beano
- Alfie "Jumbo" Johnson in the General Jumbo story from The Beano Book 1956, drawn by Paddy Brennan

Publication information
- Stars in: General Jumbo (1953–1969, 1974–1975); Admiral Jumbo (1971)
- Author(s): Uncredited
- Illustrator(s): Paddy Brennan (1953–1954, 1963); John Nichol (1956); Dave Sutherland (1963–1965); Sandy Calder (1969–1975); Keith Robson (1998)
- First appearance: Issue 583 (19 September 1953)
- Last appearance: Issue 2924 (1 August 1998)
- Current status: Discontinued
- Character timeline: Issues 583 – 599, 732–739, 1072–1094, 1126–1175, 1201–1271, 1495–1521, 1678–1734, 2924

Also appeared in
- Beano works: The Beano Annual 1956–1961, 1964–1968, 1971, 1975–1979, 1990–2006, 2008, 2009; Beano Summer Special 1964–1967, 1969–1971, 1974, 1975, 1988, 2005
- DC Thomson works: The Dandy (issue 2381); Nutty

Main Character
- Name: Alfie Johnson
- Alias(es): Jumbo; General Jumbo; Admiral Jumbo; Jimmy "Jumbo" Johnson
- Occupation: Student
- Friends: Professor Carter

General Jumbo is a British adventure story character from the comic magazine The Beano. He starred in the eponymous adventure story series, as well as the 1971 spin-off series Admiral Jumbo, and was illustrated by a variety of Beano's usual illustrators, including Paddy Brennan. Jumbo is a well-known Beano character with numerous references in popular culture, and was the last character to have an adventure stories series.

== Synopsis ==
Alfie Johnson is a 12-year-old boy playing football with his friends when their ball flies over a nearby wall. When Johnson retrieves it, Professor Carter's remote control model army attacks him. He and the professor bond after he saves Carter from being killed in a potential bus accident, so Carter shows his gratitude by giving him the models, which Johnson uses to play pretend and solve crimes.

Johnson (nicknamed "Jumbo" by his friends) is a pudgy boy who is usually shown wearing an army general cap with a mock general uniform: a shirt and tie, as well as his shorts, long socks and shoes. He is based in Dinchester.

== Publication history ==
=== Official stories ===
The General Jumbo series debuted in issue 584 with artwork by Irish DC Thomson artist Paddy Brennan. He drew for the first series and the third, his last story appearing in issue 1073. Dave Sutherland took over the third series, and drew for the fourth and fifth, which ended in issue 1271. John Nichol drew for series two (issues 732 to 739) and Sandy Calder drew the rest, as well as the stories from Admiral Jumbo (1971).

Jumbo's stories were episodic, like some stories of Beano's adventure genre. Each story was about him problem solving, playing pretend, rescuing people or catching criminals, all successful with the help of Carter's giant sets of model army figures. Admiral Jumbo was a short-lived spin-off where Carter unveils Jumbo's new navy.

=== Subsequent appearances ===
==== The Beano ====
Although Jumbo's stories discontinued in the 1970s, his "painting" would feature in issue 2000's Hall of Fame, and he would reappear in issue 2924 in 1998 for The Beano's 60th-birthday issue. Jumbo's stories appeared frequently in other Beano media, notably having stories in every Beano Annual from 1990 to 2006, as well as having frequent Annual stories in every decade except the 1980s. 2008's edition revealed him as the antagonist of Billy the Cat's three-part adventure story, the plot twist revealing one of his army models, Private Pike, had become sentient and was mind-controlling him. The saga would continue in the following annual in a General Jumbo story where Pike (disguised as a teddy bear) plans his revenge as Jumbo attends a fête. He joined 254 other Beano characters in the double-page spread of 2019's Annual to celebrate the 80th anniversary, and also made a notable appearance in 2005's Beano Action Special alongside Tim Henman and Roger Federer.

==== DC Thomson ====
He also appeared in Nutty in the early 1980s, reprints of stories originally from his Beano appearances. The Dandy featured him in issue 2381 as part of a series where readers were allowed to choose certain Beano characters to have short stories between November 1986 and March 1988.

== Reception and legacy ==
Jumbo became The Beano's last adventure story character, ending the adventure story genre for good in 1975 and making issue 1735 the first Beano magazine to contain comic strips. He was extremely popular, noted by having seven series to his name without reprinted stories, and a lot of fan mail from the readers praised the character for his entertaining episodes. Although General Jumbo was the nickname of Henry Maitland Wilson, it has not been revealed whether Jumbo's nickname is a reference to this. A General Jumbo series appeared in Buddy magazine in the early 1980s, but starring Jimmy "Jumbo" Johnson.

=== Influence on other strips ===
General Jumbo appears to be the inspiration of several other strips and characters in British comics, including:

- The Toys of Doom (Buster, 1965–1968) — Criminal scientist Doctor Droll escapes from Garstone Prison with the aid of an army of remote-controlled mechanical toys he has constructed.
- The House of Dolmann (Valiant, 1966–1970) — crime-fighting inventor Eric Dolmann creates a roster of remote-controlled robots that looked like puppets, each with special abilities, and uses them to combat crime where he finds it
- The parodies Drill-Sergeant Jumbo and Danny's District Council in Viz (from 1979)
- Colonel Tusker, killed by the Fury in Alan Moore's Captain Britain series during the "Jaspers' Warp" storyline (1981–1984)
- An unnamed character killed by the Lloigor in Zenith, in 2000 AD (from 1987)
- General Tubbs in Jack Staff
- Colonel Liliput in Alan Moore's Top 10 series (1999–2001)
