= Harry Hill's Real Life Adventures in TV Land =

British comic strip published in The Dandy (2010-2011)

Harry Hill's Real Life Adventures in TV Land was a British celebrity comics comic strip, published in The Dandy between 2010 and 2011, featuring a cartoon-version of comedian Harry Hill, his sidekick, Knitted Character, and often spoofed television celebrities.

Initially, it was planned for Harry Hill to feature in the comic's incarnation at that time, Dandy Xtreme, starting in June 2010. However, the strip's debut was delayed after a decision was made to revamp The Dandy, reverting it to a more traditional weekly comic format. The strip eventually began in issue #3508 on 30 October 2010, the first after the revamp, and ran continuously each week until issue #3565 on 14 December 2011. It was drawn by Nigel Parkinson, and featured on the majority of Dandy front covers since its debut, though other Dandy characters have also featured (most often Desperate Dan and Bananaman). Parkinson also wrote the vast majority of episodes, though Duncan Scott and Sean Baldwin also contributed a few scripts.

Despite proving to be a very popular strip in the comic, Nigel Parkinson confirmed on his blog on 8 December that the series was to be discontinued, due to circumstances beyond his control. Toxic comic expressed an interest in picking up and continuing the strip but for various reasons this never happened. It made its last regular appearance in the 2011 Christmas edition of the Dandy, but a brand new strip was commissioned and published almost a year later in the final print Dandy in December 2012.
