= Pop, Dick and Harry =

British comic strip series

Pop, Dick and Harry was a long-lasting British comic strip series published in the magazine The Beezer from 1956 until 1990. It was drawn by Tom Bannister from its inception until 1981, after which Peter Moonie drew it until 1987. Brian Walker then continued the series for another three years. Pop, Dick and Harry was the only comic strip that ran in The Beezer from the first until the last issue.

== Concept ==
Pop, Dick and Harry was a gag-a-day comic about twins, Dick and Harry, who always engaged in bad behavior and disobeyed and tormented their overweight father, Pop.
