= Mickey the Monkey =

1953 British comic strip

Mickey the Monkey was a comic strip which featured the eponymous fictional monkey, Mickey. The character was the cover star of British comic The Topper from its launch in 1953 until the 1970s. The strip appeared throughout the comic's run, until its merger with The Beezer. The final story was in The Beezer Annual 2003. It was originally drawn by Dudley D. Watkins, but after his death in 1969 Vic Neill took over as artist.

== Appearances in popular culture ==
The Clash drummer Topper Headon, real name Nicholas Bowen Headon, earned his nickname from the band's bassist Paul Simonon due to his resemblance to Mickey the Monkey.
