= Karl Dixon =

Comic artist and illustrator

Karl Dixon is a comics artist and illustrator whose work has been published in newspapers, magazines, children's books and government campaigns in the UK, Europe and the USA since the 1990s. He draws comic strips for The Dandy, including his own creations Ollie Fliptrik and Secret Agent Sally, as well as episodes of Beryl the Peril.
