= Tom Paterson =

Scottish comic artist

Tom Paterson (born April 22, 1954) is a Scottish comic artist who drew characters for Fleetway in 1973–1990, and D.C Thomson from 1986 to 2012. As of 2013, he currently draws strips for Viz.

Taking stylistic inspiration from Leo Baxendale's work on The Bash Street Kids, Paterson's talent as a cartoonist was discovered at the age of sixteen by original Dandy editor Albert Barnes, who was impressed with the cartoon samples Paterson had sent to him. Barnes offered the young artist a chance to collaborate with him on a strip called The Dangerous Dumplings (which would later be retooled as The Doyle Family for the Dandy), which was to become the leading strip of a new comic Barnes was developing, but the project was scrapped when Barnes retired and Paterson was hired to work for IPC after leaving school. When Baxendale left IPC to publish his own work, Paterson took over as artist for several of his strips, including Sweeny Toddler and Grimly Feendish. Many of his comic strips feature a single, striped sock standing upright on the ground that appears once in each story that acts as a trademark.

He is famous for drawing comics such as:

== Fleetway ==
- Grimly Feendish from Shiver and Shake
- Buster from Buster comic
- Guy Gorilla from Whizzer and Chips
- Horace and Doris from Whizzer and Chips
- Strange Hill from Whizzer and Chips
- Robert's Robot from Whizzer and Chips
- Watford Gapp from Whizzer and Chips
- Crow Jak from Buster and Monster Fun
- Scooper from Jackpot
- Full 'O' Beans from Jackpot
- Jake's Seven from Jackpot
- The Park from Jackpot
- School Belle from School Fun
- Team Mates from Wow!
- Sweeny Toddler for Whoopee and later Whizzer and Chips

== D.C Thomson ==
=== The Beano ===
- Calamity James
- The Numskulls
- Minnie the Minx
- Dennis the Menace
- Fred's Bed (reprints and new strips)
- Bash Street Kids - Singled Out
- Roger the Dodger
- Billy Whizz (Beano annuals 2008 and 2010)
- Ivy the Terrible
- Ball Boy
- Little Larry

=== Beezer ===
- The Banana Bunch
- Fred's Bed (Beezer and Topper)
- Phoot and Mouse
- The Numskulls

=== The Dandy ===
- Beryl the Peril
- Bananaman
- Brain Duane
- Euro School
- Fiddle 'o' Diddle
- Freddy the Fearless Fly
- Hyde & Shriek
- Laughing Planet
- Mutant Cow
- Rasper

=== Brain Duane ===
Brain Duane was a comic strip in The Dandy. It was about a nerdy bald inventor whose inventions would always go wrong. It was drawn by Tom Paterson between 1997 and 2005 before it was taken over by Duncan Scott. The strip disappeared when the comic became Dandy Xtreme. He returned in the 2012 Dandy Annual drawn by Steve Beckett. He was one of the characters featured in the PC game, Beanotown Racing.

== Other ==
=== Viz ===
- Wee Radge Joe
- Nash Gordon
- Foul-Mouthed Super-Obese Mobility Scooter Woman

=== Moose Kid Comics ===
- Beelzababy
