= Peter's Pocket Grandpa =

British comic strip character

Peter's Pocket Grandpa was a fictional character in a comic strip in the UK comic magazine The Dandy. The comic first appeared in issue #1771, dated 1 November 1975, and was drawn by Ron Spencer for the majority of its run, with a few later strips being drawn by John Geering. The strip was essentially an updated version of another strip called "Jimmy's Pocket Grandpa", which had exactly the same premise and had first appeared in the Dandy in 1940.

The strip told the rather whimsical and sad story of a schoolboy named Peter Parker, who lived with his parents and grandfather in perfectly ordinary circumstances until a visit to a fairground left a gypsy angry after an argument with Grandpa. The gypsy promptly put a curse on Grandpa which left him just six inches tall. As a result, the adventures of the family mainly centred on Peter and his Grandpa, who was in constant danger of being eaten by cats, closed inside books etc., but also handy for getting through tight gaps on various archetypal schoolboy adventures. It ran until the early 1980s, and later inspired the Viz strip Mickey's Miniature Grandpa.

From 2009 to 2014, a program called Grandpa in My Pocket appeared on CBeebies, based on the comic.
