= Blinky (comics) =

British comic strip

Blinky is a British comic strip, created by Nick Brennan, and published in the comic book The Beezer and Topper from 1990 until 1994 and in The Dandy until 2007.

== Concept ==
Blinky is a young boy with large, thick glasses through whom he sees a galaxy very different from the rest of the world, which often leads to chaos. His trusty sidekick, Yellow Dog, always seems to get caught up in Blinky's adventures, and is very keen to get rid of him.

When Blinky first appeared in 1990, the design of the character seemed to be a younger version of an earlier Beezer comic strip called Colonel Blink. However, when The Beezer and Topper folded, and Nick Brennan began drawing the strip in January 1994, Blinky took on a new look that was now quite unlike Colonel Blink. The design was altered further over the next few years.

Following the relaunch in late 2007, Nick Brennan, the artist, left The Dandy, and so there were no Blinky strips being produced from then on. However, from issue 3438 in January 2008, the character has returned as reprints from the late 1990s. Nick Brennan came back in September 2011 with his strip Watch this Space.
