= Tricky Dicky (Topper) =

British comic strip

- DC Thomson comic strip character(s)

Publication information
- Creator(s): John Dallas
- Other contributors: Laura Howell Danny Pearson

First appearance
- The Beano: 1999
- The Topper: 1976

Last appearance
- The Topper: 1990
- Beezer/Topper: 1993

Main character
- Name: Richard "Dicky" Bennett
- Alias(es): Tricky Dicky
- Family: His parents
- Friend(s): 2, as well as the special guest of the week in 2018

Tricky Dicky is a British comic strip which debuted in the magazine Topper in December 1976 and was drawn by John Dallas. From 1979 to 1986 he was the cover star of the comic, succeeding Danny's Tranny and preceding Beryl the Peril. The strip survived the merger with the Beezer in 1990 and continued in The combined Beezer and Topper comic til it ended in 1993. The character later reappeared in The Beano.

== Concept ==
The comic strip was a gag-a-day strip starring a young boy named Dicky, who plays practical jokes on people, but they usually managed to get the last laugh. From 1999 to 2000 he re-appeared as a 'Guest Star' in The Beano, again drawn by Dallas, running against The Three Bears, Inspector Horse and Jocky and Gordon Bennett to be voted into the comic by readers, though The Three Bears was the winner. The basic premise of the strip was expanded to include that Dicky's father now owned a joke shop, explaining where he got all these jokes from. In Issue #4 of BeanoMAX, Tricky Dicky makes a surprise guest one-off appearance with a new look trying to trick Ball Boy, but it doesn't work. Tricky Dicky also starred alongside Roger the Dodger in the Beano Summer Special 2003. Tricky Dicky reappeared in a new strip in The Beano in 2013, this time drawn by Laura Howell. This new strip was a reboot with Tricky Dicky's appearance being changed and the character being given the new first name of Gordon. In the new strip, he is a more heroic figure, as he only plays pranks on people who deserve it.

== Comparison to other comics with the same name ==
A character of the same name appeared in the children's TV series ZZZap!. Another trickster child character of the same name, but otherwise a different character appeared in the "Cor!!" Comic published by Fleetway. And, finally a character called "Tricky Dicky Doyle" appeared in The Dandy in 1997.

== Appearances in Annuals ==
Tricky Dicky was put in the 2020 Annual as his own comic strip, but he did have an appearance on the Beano Annual 2016 cover. He also appeared in the 2017 Annual as a non-speaking character.
