= Midnight Patrol: Adventures in the Dream Zone =

- The logo for both versions of the show.
- Also known as: Potsworth & Co.
- Genre: Adventure; Fantasy; Comedy
- Created by: Martin Powell; Vivien Schrager-Powell
- Directed by: Don Lusk; Paul Sommer; Animation Directors: Joanna Romersa; Sam Nicholson; Robert Alvarez; Joan Drake; Bill Hutten; Glen Kennedy; Ed Love; Tony Love; Irven Spence; Alan Wilzbach
- Creative director: Ray Patterson
- Voices of: Michael Bell; Hamilton Camp; Joan Gerber; Elisabeth Harnois; Whitby Hertford; Janice Kawaye; George Lemore; Kenneth Mars; Rob Paulsen; Clive Revill; Frank Welker
- Theme music composer: Michael Tavera
- Countries of origin: United Kingdom; United States
- Original language: English
- No. of episodes: 13

Production
- Executive producers: William Hanna; Joseph Barbera; Martin Powell; Vivien Schrager-Powell; Paul Sabella; Theresa Plummer-Andrews
- Producer: Davis Doi
- Running time: 21 minutes
- Production companies: H-B Production Co. Sleepy Kids PLC

Original release
- Network: BBC1; The Children's Channel (UK); Syndication (US)
- Release: 2 September – 25 November 1990

Midnight Patrol: Adventures in the Dream Zone is an animated television series produced by H-B Production Co. in conjunction with Sleepy Kids PLC and is known outside the U.S. as Potsworth & Co. In the United Kingdom, the BBC felt that the suggestion of children being awake after midnight was inappropriate (which is reflected in the theme song's lyrics in the British broadcast); thus the name was changed.

The show is about four children who meet in their dreams every night, accompanied by their dog Potsworth and a toy dinosaur, to protect the sleep of the innocent from the dreaded Nightmare Prince.

== History ==
The series revolves around Potsworth, an English Springer Spaniel, based upon a real-life springer spaniel called Potsworth, bought from the Battersea Dogs Home by Martin and Vivien Schrager-Powell. The couple were somewhat disheartened with some of the children's programmes being made at the time, commenting that "Six-year-olds just aren't content to be fobbed off with 'Mr Wizard go pouf and nasty man go away'. Stories these days have to be believable, contain some logical process". In 1987, Martin started writing stories about Potsworth who lives in a city in America and four young children: Carter, Keiko, Rosie, and Nick. The couple took the idea to Hanna-Barbera and suggested a 50-50 deal to turn the stories into a television series.

First appearing on The Funtastic World of Hanna-Barbera on 1 September 1990, Midnight Patrol: Adventures in the Dream Zone lasted only 13 episodes. It was watched by 8.5 million in the US while 5.1 million watched the series on Children's BBC in Britain, making it the "second most popular children's show on British television after Neighbours".

The "real" Potsworth became something of a celebrity when he featured extensively in the British media as part of the promotion campaign for the cartoon series when it first aired in the UK in 1990/91 television season. A comic adaptation of Potsworth & Co. was featured in the merged Beezer and Topper from issue #87 to #153 (May 16, 1992 – August 21, 1993) and, when that comic closed, The Dandy from issue #2701 onwards (August 28, 1993 – 1994).

The series' setting, "Dream Zone", was first used on "Back to Next Saturday", the NBC Saturday Morning preview special for the 1985 season.

== Premise ==
The series tells of four children and Potsworth the dog who live in the same neighborhood. When they go to sleep at night they turn up in the Dream Zone where, as the Midnight Patrol, they are appointed by the Grand Dozer to protect it from nightmares and other threats and are given their missions by the Snooze Patrol. Their main enemy is the Nightmare Prince.

Whilst they are in the Dream Zone, the five have special powers. Keiko has a flying skateboard; Carter can draw anything and then have it come to life; Nick is super-strong and is able to fly; his stuffed toy Murphy comes to life; whilst his cynical sister Rosie tags along. Potsworth himself acquires the power of speech which enables him to complain about the way he is treated in the real world, and make wry comments about the kids and their own attitudes and relationships. The cartoon Potsworth had a very "English" accent, even in the American version of the programmes, reflecting his real-life counterpart's British origins.

== Computer game ==
An officially licensed computer game of the series, using its British title of Potsworth and Co, was released in 1992 by Hi-Tec Software for the ZX Spectrum, Amstrad CPC, Commodore 64 and Atari ST.

In this scrolling platform game, the player took on the role of one of the characters in each themed level and had to collect various items and then reach the exit.

== Characters ==
=== Midnight Patrol ===
The 5 Midnight Patrol members are the main stars of the show. Each one has his/her individual abilities.

- Potsworth – A sarcastic 10-year-old English Springer Spaniel who is the leader and has the ability to talk when he enters the Dream Zone.
- Carter – Potsworth's owner. A 10-year-old African American boy who is an expert artist. In the Dream Zone, his magic paintbrush can bring many things to life.
- Keiko – A 9-year-old Japanese American girl who rides a flying skateboard in the Dream Zone. She is energetic and very optimistic and likes to be seen as the leader of the group.
- Rosie – An 8-year-old girl. A rude, annoying brat who gives the group a very hard time, though she still helps out in dangerous situations. She calls her brother Nick by his full name "Nicholas" whenever she yells at him, which is quite often. She is the only member of the Midnight Patrol without a special ability.
- Nick – Rosie's 6-year-old brother who is a flying superhero when he's in the Dream Zone and is sometimes referred to as "Super Nick".
  - Murphy – Nick's toy Brontosaurus who comes to life when he enters the Dream Zone.

=== Other Dream Zone characters ===
The Dream Zone has a number of inhabitants, the principals of which include:

- The Grand Dozer – The King of the Dream Zone. He spends his time half-asleep on top of a pile of mattresses. He has to stay this way because if he were to be fully awake the Dream Zone will come to an end. The Grand Dozer gives advice, but in the form of riddles which can be a bit of a frustration.
- The Chief – A large but friendly woman who heads the local police department and assigns the Midnight Patrol with their missions.
- Sebastian – The Grand Dozer's head butler. He is always anxious that his King is safe and asleep. A running gag of the series is that, whenever Sebastian claims the Grand Dozer is in a certain mood, the Grand Dozer would be shown sleeping, prompting Sebastian to state the Grand Dozer would be in that mood if he were awake.
- The Greystone Giant – A giant made of rock who lives in a cave filled with various objects which he supplies for people's dreams. Because there are so many dreamers he is always at work and never stops grumbling about it. Though deep down, he loves his job.
- The Nosey Bird – A talking bird who enjoys spreading gossip. He has a sinister voice like Peter Lorre and appears in the episodes "The Nightmirror" and "Santa-Napped".

=== Antagonists ===
- The Nightmare Prince – The main villain of the series. The Nightmare Prince is always coming up with ways of disrupting the Grand Dozer's sleep or other nasty schemes in order to allow nightmares to take over the dreams. He is the Midnight Patrol's main enemy, though he is such a bungling idiot that his plans can fail due to his own incompetence. He is also not above working with the Patrol when it suits his interests. He has a large-sized telephone (as opposed to a mobile phone) literally up his sleeve, through which he receives calls from his mother.
  - Igor – One of the Nightmare Prince's dimwitted potato-shaped minions.
  - Irving – One of the Nightmare Prince's dimwitted potato-shaped minions.
  - Shorty – One of the Nightmare Prince's dimwitted potato-shaped minions.
- The Nightmare Prince's Mother – This unseen character is always phoning up to nag her son, telling him to get on with destroying happy dreams and reproving him when things go wrong.
- The Cat – A giant cat who enjoys bullying and terrorizing the dogs in Dogland. He only appears in "King Potsworth".
- Count Bubba Bonebreaker – The nephew of the Nightmare Prince's Mother and the cousin of the Nightmare Prince. This villain was once in charge of nightmares when the Nightmare Prince's Mother demoted the Nightmare Prince to janitor. The Midnight Patrol helped the Nightmare Prince get back his position by thwarting Bubba. He only appears in "When Bubba Rules".

== Episodes ==
No.	Title	Written by	Original release date
1	"Night of the BedBugs"	Story by : Bill Matheny, Lane Raichert & Laren Bright; Teleplay by : Alan Swayze & Earl Kress	2 September 1990
The Nightmare Prince unleashes a horde of creatures called BedBugs in an attempt to destroy the Dream Zone. But when they start eating his castle, he needs the Midnight Patrol's help to get rid of them.
2	"The Dozer Walks Among Us"	Story by : Bill Matheny & Laren Bright; Teleplay by : Evelyn A-R Gabai & Lane Raichert	9 September 1990
When he sleepwalks, the Grand Dozer goes around the Dream Zone causing unintentional chaos and destruction. Thus, he has to be locked up once in a while in order to prevent this — that is until the Nightmare Prince lets him loose.
3	"King Potsworth"	Story by : Bill Matheny, Lane Raichert & Laren Bright; Teleplay by : Kristina Luckey	16 September 1990
Potsworth becomes the somewhat reluctant king of a kingdom of dogs called Dogland. He enlists the rest of the Midnight Patrol when Dogland is attacked by a giant devastating cat.
4	"The Nightmirror"	Story by : Bill Matheny & Lane Raichert; Teleplay by : Kristina Luckey	23 September 1990
The Nightmare Prince steals the Nightmirror which he uses to create evil twins of the Midnight Patrol who wreak havoc in the Dream Zone.
5	"When Bubba Rules"	Story by : Bill Matheny, Lane Raichert & Laren Bright; Teleplay by : Evelyn A-R Gabai	30 September 1990
Exasperated by her son's constant failures to destroy the Dream Zone, the Nightmare Prince's mother assigns her monstrous nephew Count Bubba Bonebreaker to act as his supervisor. Though Count Bonebreaker takes over his job and demotes him to janitor. Before long, the Midnight Patrol decide that the Prince was not such a bad thing after all.
6	"Nick's Super Switch"	Story by : Bill Matheny, Lane Raichert & Laren Bright; Teleplay by : Evelyn A-R Gabai	7 October 1990
Nick switches places with a superhero boy named Wonder Kid from the Dream Zone location of Supertown after having been bullied by a boy named Moose.
7	"Dozer Quest"	Story by : Bill Matheny, Lane Raichert & Laren Bright; Teleplay by : Evelyn A-R Gabai	14 October 1990
The Grand Dozer is not sleeping and if he stays awake, the Dream Zone will end. The Midnight Patrol have to go to all lengths to get him back to sleep. Carter has an idea, but then he can't sleep either.
8	"Rosie's Extra Sweet Day"	Story by : Bill Matheny, Lane Raichert & Laren Bright; Teleplay by : Ken Knox	21 October 1990
After a conversation with a talking tree, Rosie gets turned into the nicest girl in the Dream Zone.
9	"I Was a Teenage Babysitter"	Story by : Bill Matheny, Lane Raichert & Laren Bright; Teleplay by : Kristina Luckey & Evelyn A-R Gabai	28 October 1990
Rosie must take care of the Greystone Giant's little son Rocky.
10	"The Wishing Whale"	Story by : Bill Matheny, Lane Raichert & Laren Bright; Teleplay by : Alan Swayze	4 November 1990
The Midnight Patrol (minus Keiko) meet the Wishing Whale who grants them their fondest wishes. But then the wishes get somewhat out of hand.
11	"Santanapped"	Bill Matheny, Lane Raichert & Laren Bright	11 November 1990
The Nightmare Prince captures Santa Claus and the Midnight Patrol must rescue him to save Christmas.
12	"Save the Cave"	Bill Matheny, Lane Raichert & Laren Bright	18 November 1990
The Greystone Giant is too far behind in his dream supplies, so the Midnight Patrol help him keep up with the dream orders. Though the Nightmare Prince plans to disrupt their plans.
13	"Rosie's Fuss Attack"	Story by : Bill Matheny, Lane Raichert & Laren Bright; Teleplay by : David Schwartz	25 November 1990
Rosie panics when she takes on the appearance of those she has criticised so the Midnight Patrol must find a special cure for her.

== Cast ==
- Charles Adler as Rocky (in "I Was a Teenage Babysitter") and First Bedbug in (in "Night of the Bedbugs")
- Christine Avila
- Michael Bell as Sebastian
- Hamilton Camp as The Grand Dozer
- Brian Cummings as King Spot (in "King Potsworth")
- Jim Cummings as Giant Cat (in "King Potsworth"), Rags (in "King Potsworth")
- Judyann Elder as The Chief
- Patrick Fraley as Jester Dog (in "King Potsworth")
- Dick Gautier
- Joan Gerber as Nightmare Prince's Mother
- Dorian Harewood as Superland School Gym Coach (in "Nick's Super Switch")
- Elisabeth Harnois as Rosie
- Whitby Hertford as Nick
- Janice Kawaye as Keiko
- Emily Kuroda
- George Lemore as Carter
- David Lander
- Marilyn Lightstone
- Allan Lurie
- Kenneth Mars as Greystone Giant
- Scott Menville as Wonder Kid (in "Nick's Super Switch")
- Brian Mitchell
- Howie Morris as Dr. Akenhoffer (in "Rosie's Fuss Attack")
- Ron Palillo
- Rob Paulsen as Nightmare Prince and Snooty Hair Dryer (in "I Was a Teenage Babysitter")
- Henry Polic II
- Clive Revill as Potsworth
- Ronnie Schell
- Tom Scott
- Hal Smith as Santa Claus (in "Santa-Napped")
- B.J. Ward
- Frank Welker as Murphy, Nosey Bird (in "The Nightmirror," "Santa-Napped"), Sludge Monster in ("I Was a Teenage Babysitter")
- Anderson Wong

== Ratings (CBBC Channel) ==
Monday 6 May 2002- 20,000 (9th most watched on CBBC that week)

== Home media ==
In 1991, Hanna-Barbera Home Video released a single VHS cassette of the series in the United States entitled Potsworth and the Midnight Patrol containing four episodes which are "Save the Cave", "The Wishing Whale", "King Potsworth", and "The Nightmirror".
