= Classics from the Comics =

1996–2010 British comics magazine

Classics from the comics

Publication information
- Publisher: DC Thomson
- Schedule: Monthly
- Format: Ongoing series
- Publication date: March 1996 – October 2010
- No. of issues: 175

Classics from the Comics was a British comics magazine, published from March 1996 until October 2010. Published monthly, it was D. C. Thomson & Co. Ltd's third all-reprint comic. It replaced The Best of Topper and The Best of Beezer, which had reprinted old strips for some years.

Classics from the Comics collected archive comic strips from eight comic titles – the still going The Beano and The Dandy, and the defunct Beezer, Topper, Nutty, Sparky, Cracker, and Buzz. During its later issues, adventure comics from the likes of The Victor, The Wizard, The Rover, The Hotspur and The Hornet were used. It also started using Hoot! shortly before it ended.

The comic had 64 pages, and the front cover depicted many of the characters in one group activity, drawn from September 1997 to May 2006 by Anthony Caluori. The reprints inside were prefaced with a contents page ("Classic Contents") and until 2007 were followed by an advert for the next month's issue, with the back cover showing original strips starring Roger the Dodger, Little Plum, Plug, Beryl the Peril, and Desperate Dan amongst others, drawn by Gordon Bell, Anthony Caluori, or Keith Reynolds.

In 2006, the cover was redesigned to show "Classics from the Comics" with a roundel containing Korky the Cat's head and the words Classics Collection, and a large illustration by Ken H. Harrison. The new editor started penning a letter to the readers on the contents page, and the advert and original strip on the inside and back covers were replaced by further reprinted strips, which are always Korky the Cat and Biffo the Bear.

A small notice was published on all the pages, identifying which comic the strip comes from (Classic Beano, Classic Dandy, etc.). Near the end of each issue, a "Readers Requests" postal address was displayed, so readers could write to DC Thomson and request other archive strips to go in a future issue.

Free gifts in the form of The Fun Size Beanos or The Fun Size Dandys were featured in early issues, plus free gifts originally given away with The Beano or The Dandy. In July 2004 Classics from the Comics celebrated its 100th issue, revamping the front cover at the same time, changing the logo from a plain serif font to a sans-serif one with a 3-D effect.

The August 2008 issue was a Beano special, featuring only characters from that 70-year-old comic. It featured the oldest (Ping the Elastic Man and Deep Down Daddy Neptune, 1938), and most recent stories (specifically the picture of Dennis, Gnasher, Wallace & Gromit from the Beano printed only the previous day; the most recent actual story was "Crazy for Daisy" from 2003) ever used. For this issue, the usual Korky roundel was replaced with the logo from the 70 Years of Fun collector's edition.

'D. C. Thomson & Co. Ltd's Golden Years/60 Years/70 Years books, which are brought out each Christmas, are effectively Classic From the Comics' annual, although they started in 1988, eight years before Classics launched.

Despite a further 'retro' relaunch in the spring of 2010, Classics from the Comics ended that October, the final issue being number 175.
