= Andy Fanton =

British comics artist

Andy Fanton is a British comic strip creator, artist, writer and creator of The Carrotty Kid, Lord Likely and The Turquoise Tiger. Andy is best known for his work in The Dandy and The Beano.

Fanton's work first appeared in the first issue of the 2010 relaunched Dandy with his strip 'George Vs Dragon'. After the initial 12-week run finished, Fanton moved on to ghostly goings on in 'Boo!' from February 2011 to April 2011 plus a revamp of the 80's Dandy comic Harry And His Hippo which ran from March 2011 to April 2011, as part of "Strictly Come Laughing". Harry and His Hippo won the vote, ahead of Daredevil Dad, Tag Team Tastic and Phil's Finger. Andy Fanton later introduced more series such as Bad Grandad and Secret Agent Sir. Fanton's characters continue to appear in The Dandy Summer Specials and yearly Dandy Annual.

For the final print edition of The Dandy on its 75th anniversary, Andy Fanton drew Bad Grandad, Hungry Horace, Plum MacDuff and Harry and his Hippo. Andy Fanton is currently writing Minnie The Minx, Roger the Dodger and The Bash Street Kids in The Beano.

Andy also publishes his own website fiction series; the Astonishing Adventures of Lord Likely, which has been running since 2007.

Created in the early 90's, Andy's popular webcomic, The Carrotty Kid, was commissioned into an animated pilot for ITV in 2004 by Cosgrove Hall Films.

However, the pilot of The Carrotty Kid was not transmitted due to ITV restructuring and cutting back on new children's programming.

Andrew lives in Portsmouth UK with his son.

== List of published comics ==
- Minnie The Minx ~ The Beano (writing, current)
- The Bash Street Kids ~ The Beano (writing, current)
- Rodger the Dodger ~ The Beano (writing, current)
- George VS. Dragon ~ The Dandy (weekly, specials and Annuals)
- Boo! ~ The Dandy
- Harry and his Hippo ~ The Dandy
- Grampire ~ The Dandy (weekly, specials & Annuals)
- Calamity James ~ The Beano (writing)
- Little Plum ~ The Beano (writing)
- Constable Caveman ~ The Beano
- Emlyn the Gremlin ~ The Beano
- Robopop ~ The Beano
- Springwatch ~ The Dandy
- Mad March Hare ~ The Dandy
- Thor ~ The Dandy
- Dave the Squirrel ~ The Dandy
- Punslinger ~ The Dandy (writing, pencilling)
- Elf and Safety ~ The Dandy
- Rude-olph ~ The Dandy
- Stupid Barrio Bros ~ The Dandy
- Iykan Si-Yu ~ The Dandy
- Bad Grandad ~ The Dandy
- Al Kazam ~ The Dandy
- Cavemen in Black ~ The Dandy
- The Chav Olympics ~ The Dandy
- Rocky Roller, Pest Controller ~ The Dandy
- Teacher Training ~ The Dandy
- Constable Clod ~ The Dandy
- Secret Agent Sir ~ The Dandy
- Plum MacDuff ~ The Dandy
- Hungry Horace ~ The Dandy
