= David Law (cartoonist) =

Cartoonist

David Law (15 June 1908 – 30 April 1971) was a Scottish cartoonist best known for creating Dennis the Menace and Beryl the Peril for Dundee publishers D. C. Thomson & Co. Ltd .

== Life ==
Law was born and raised in Edinburgh and educated at Edinburgh College of Art. He first worked for Odhams Press as an illustrator, before moving to D. C. Thomson in the early 1930s. He drew cartoons for Thomsons newspapers like the Evening Telegraph, including a strip called The Wee Fella.

His most famous creation, Dennis the Menace, first appeared in The Beano issue 452, dated 17 March 1951. Due to British comics being printed several days before distribution to newsagents (bearing the date of the following week to give them a longer shelf life), it seems beyond dispute that the UK Dennis saw print before Hank Ketcham's identically named Dennis the Menace, which began syndication in the USA on 12 March 1951. It is possible that - at the very latest - the British version could have made his public debut on the same day as his Stateside counterpart, although it seems likely that he preceded him even in that. However, it is still unknown which character was actually created first. Law's Dennis was a juvenile anti-hero, uncontrollable and destructive, drawn in spontaneous, edgy lines, and was an immediate hit; the strip eventually displaced Biffo the Bear on the comic's full colour front cover in 1974. Law went on to create Beryl the Peril, a similarly anarchic female character, for the Topper in 1953, and the accident-prone soldier Corporal Clott for The Dandy in 1960.

He was taken ill in 1970, and his strips were taken over by other artists, including David Sutherland on Dennis the Menace and John Dallas on Beryl the Peril. Law returned briefly to The Beano in 1971, but died on 30 April that year, aged 62.
