= Dudley D. Watkins =

English cartoonist (1907–1969)

- Born: 27 February 1907 Prestwich, Lancashire, England
- Died: 20 August 1969 (aged 62) Broughty Ferry, Dundee, Scotland
- Areas: Cartoonist, Artist
- Notable works: Oor Wullie and The Broons
- Awards: British Comic Awards Hall of Fame (2015)

Dudley Dexter Watkins (27 February 1907 – 20 August 1969) was an English cartoonist and illustrator. He is best known for his characters Oor Wullie and The Broons; comic strips featuring them have appeared in the Scottish newspaper The Sunday Post since 1936, along with annual compilations. Watkins also illustrated comics such as The Beano, The Dandy, The Beezer and Topper, and provided illustrations for Christian stories. Watkins was posthumously inducted into the British Comic Awards Hall of Fame in 2015.

== Early life ==
Watkins was born in Prestwich, Lancashire, England. However, the family moved to Nottingham while he was still a baby. His father was a lithographic print artist who noted the boy's early artistic talent and ensured he received extra art classes at the Nottingham School of Art. By the age of 10, the local newspaper declared him a "schoolboy genius." He studied at Nottingham School of Art, and while working for Boots Pure Drug company in the early 1920s, Watkins' first published artwork appeared in Boots' staff magazine, The Beacon.

== Work with D.C. Thomson ==
In 1924 Watkins entered the Glasgow School of Art. In 1925 the school principal recommended Watkins to the thriving publisher D.C. Thomson, based in Dundee. Watkins was offered a six-month employment contract with D. C. Thomson, so he moved to their Dundee base and began providing illustrations for Thomson's "Big Five" story papers for boys (Adventure, Rover, Wizard, and later Skipper and Hotspur). The temporary employment turned into a full-time career; for several years he was just another illustrator, supplementing his small salary by teaching Illustration at Dundee College of Art c.1934-38. In 1933 Watkins turned his hand to comic strip work, and soon his editor noticed that Watkins had a special talent as a cartoonist. In 1933 he drew The Rover Midget Comic and in 1934 he drew The Skipper Midget Comic. In 1935 Watkins' first regular comic strip, Percy Vere and His Trying Tricks appeared; the titular character was an inept magician whose tricks usually backfired on him. The strip ran for nearly two years, finally being replaced with another Watkins creation, Wandering Willie The Wily Explorer (Willie's hard-boiled characteristics would later re-appear in the form of Desperate Dan). While Percy was still appearing in Adventure, Watkins co-created, with writer/editor R. D. Low, what would become his most famous characters, Oor Wullie and The Broons. They were part of the first issue (8 March 1936) of a weekly eight-page pull-out 'Fun Section' of The Sunday Post. He was soon illustrating the Desperate Dan strip for The Dandy comic, launched in December 1937.

His workload was further increased when D.C. Thomson created The Beano, an eight-page comic booklet, with Watkins being responsible for drawing the Lord Snooty strip. The Beano's first edition was dated 30 July 1938. When the Beezer and Topper were launched in the 1950s, Watkins was responsible for illustrating the Ginger strip (based largely on Oor Wullie, but unlike that strip the text was written in standard English and not in Scots vernacular) and the Mickey the Monkey strip for the two comics.

Watkins' most enduring adventure strip was Jimmy and his Magic Patch, which debuted in the 1 January 1944 issue of The Beano and ran for 18 years.

Watkins was one of only two D. C. Thomson cartoonists who signed their work (beginning in June 1946), which was known for its intricate detail and unique style. The other cartoonist to sign his work was Allan Morley and he was the first to do so.

== Personal life ==
He was a devout Christian and an enthusiastic supporter of the Church of Christ in Dundee (where he met his wife). He contributed artwork for mission calendars, and from 1956 he produced (free of charge) the comic strips William the Warrior and Tony & Tina – The Twins for The Young Warrior, a children's paper published by the WEC Publications. These strips, filled with quotations from Scripture, were collected into a series of booklets. In March 2008 a watercolour by Watkins depicting The Crucifixion was discovered in a house in Lochgelly, Fife.

Watkins and his wife built a substantial house in Broughty Ferry which he named Winsterly. He continued working with D. C. Thomson for the rest of his life. On 20 August 1969 he was found dead at his drawing board, the victim of a heart attack.

D. C. Thomson continued to reprint Oor Wullie and Broons strips in The Sunday Post for seven years before a replacement was found. Watkins' Desperate Dan strips were reprinted in The Dandy for fourteen years.
