= Gordon Bell (cartoonist) =

British cartoonist (1934–2014)

Gordon Bell (1934 – 13 February 2014) was a British cartoonist, best known for humorous strips for D. C. Thomson's weekly comics, including "Pup Parade" in The Beano and "Spoofer McGraw" in Sparky.

== Biography ==
Bell grew up in Dundee, Scotland, where he was educated at Clepington Primary School and Morgan Academy, and studied art at Duncan of Jordanstone College of Art and Design. He and author Brian Callison ran CB Studios, an art and furniture business, for a time.

From the late 1950s he worked as a cartoonist, mainly for D. C. Thomson & Co. Ltd, publishers of The Beano and The Dandy among others. He contributed to most of the company's comics. His longest running strip was "Pup Parade", a spin-off of "The Bash Street Kids" featuring the kids' dogs, which he drew regularly in The Beano from 1967 to 1988, in The Topper from 1989 to 1990, and The Beezer from 1990 to 1992. According to D. C. Thomson editor Iain McLaughlin, he was "professional, quick, and ready to try anything." He did some work for IPC's comics, drawing "The Wolf Pack" in Whoopee! in 1974, and for the motoring magazine Autocar, and created the "9 Wellies", cartoon characters designed to cheer up children in hospital for NHS Tayside. His satirical cartoons headed the political diary every Saturday in The Courier, signed "Fax".

His main interest outside work was motor sports. He was a member of 750 Motor Club, and an RAC steward at Knockhill Racing Circuit. He and his wife Isabel, with whom he had two sons and two stepsons, lived in the West End of Dundee. He died suddenly on 13 February 2014, at the age of 79.

== Comics work ==
=== The Beano ===
- "Pom-Pom" (1958)
- "Dennis the Menace" (1966)
- "The Bash Street Kids" (1967)
- "Pup Parade" (1967–1988, continued in The Topper, 1989–90, and The Beezer, 1990–1992)
- "Roger the Dodger" (1968)

=== The Beezer ===
- "The Wabits"
- "Colonel Blink"

=== Buzz ===
- "Harum-Scarem" (1973–74)
- "Sammy's Scribbles" (1973–1975, continued in The Topper, 1975–76)
- "The Buzzies and the Fuzzies" (1973–1975)

=== Cracker ===
- "Billy the Kid and Pongo" (1975–76)
- "Fiends Beans" (1975–76)

=== The Dandy ===
- "Fibba" (1972)
- "The Dandy Editor's Little Helpers"
- "Joe Mince"

=== Nutty ===
- "Scoopy" (1980–1985)
- "Doodlebug" (1980–1982)
- "Snoozer"
- "Micro Dot"

=== Plug ===
- "Hugh's Zoo" (1977–1979, continued in The Beezer, 1979)
- "First Ada" (1977–1979, continued in The Beezer, 1979)

=== Sparky ===
- "Spoofer McGraw" (1968–1974)
- "Dreamy Daniel"

=== The Topper ===
- "Pearl" (1986)
- "The Neals on Wheels" (1986)
- "Kuckoo Komedy" (1986)
- "Jimmy Jinx"

=== Whoopee! ===
- "The Wolf Pack" (1974, Annuals 1975 and 1976)
