= The Beezer =

British comic magazine

- Cartoonists: Leo Baxendale, Gordon Bell, Paddy Brennan, David Law, Tom Paterson, Bill Ritchie, Dudley D. Watkins, Malcolm Judge, John Geering
- Categories: British comics
- Frequency: Weekly
- Publisher: D. C. Thomson & Co. Ltd.
- First issue: 21 January 1956
- Final issue Number: 21 August 1993; 1809
- Country: United Kingdom
- Language: English

The Beezer (called The Beezer and Topper for the last three years of publication) was a British comic that ran from (issues dates) 21 January 1956 to 21 August 1993, published by D. C. Thomson & Co. Ltd. Comic strips in The Beezer were a mix of irreverence, slapstick, and adventure; notable creators included Leo Baxendale, Gordon Bell, Paddy Brennan, David Law, Tom Paterson, Bill Ritchie, Dudley D. Watkins, Malcolm Judge, and John Geering.

== Publication history ==
Like its sister comic, The Topper, The Beezer was an A3 (tabloid) publication, twice as big as most other comics. It shrank to A4 paper size in 1981.

Comics that merged into The Beezer during its 37-year run were Cracker in 1976, and Plug in 1979.

The Beezer launched an annual, The Beezer Book, in 1957; this continued in publication following the closure of the weekly comic, and ran until the 2003 book (published 2002).

=== 1990 merger with The Topper ===
In September 1990, DC Thomson decided to rationalise their comics portfolio and merged the Beezer with The Topper. Whereas most previous comic mergers saw the name of one of the 'absorbed' comics disappear, The Topper was considered significant enough for its name to be retained despite the merger and as such the comic was renamed Beezer and Topper following the relaunch (Whizzer and Chips was conceived as a double comic, and was not the result of a merger.)

=== Cancellation/merger with The Beano ===
Beezer and Topper ceased publication as a weekly comic in 1993; when it closed it was essentially (unofficially) "merged" with The Beano, as this is where the bulk of surviving content from the comic (most prominently The Numskulls) ended up. Some also went to DC Thomson's other surviving weekly comic, The Dandy.

== Annuals and other Beezer publications ==
Although the weekly Beezer and Topper had merged, the two comics' annuals (The Beezer Book and The Topper Book) remained separate publications. The closure of Beezer and Topper led to the closure of the Topper annual as of the 1994 book (published 1993), but The Beezer Book continued in publication annually for some years thereafter, eventually ceasing with the 2003 book (published 2002). Other Beezer publications that continued after the weekly comic's closure were The Best of Beezer (launched 1988, closed 1996) and The Beezer Summer Special (launched 1973, known as the 'Holiday Special' from 1998 onwards, closed 2002).

Vintage strips from the Beezer were published alongside stories from other DC Thomson publications in Classics from the Comics, which was published from 1996 to 2010.

A The Best of the Beezer Annual was released in 2014, published by Pedigree Books as part of the Retro Classics series. It contained reprints of old Beezer comics. Despite the name saying "annual", a second book was never released.

== Strips ==
The Beezer was home to 120 different comic strips over the years.
