= List of Beezer comic strips =

The Beezer was a long-running weekly British comic book, which was the home to 120 different comic strips over the years. First printed in 1956, it merged with the Cracker and Plug comic strips in 1976 and 1979 respectively. It was, then, renamed into The Beezer and Topper on merging with The Topper in 1990. However, publication ceased in 1993 eventually. After its closure, some of its characters appeared in The Beano and The Dandy.

The following is a list of Beezer comic strips, organized by year of release date and in chronological order:

== 1956 ==
Strip Title	Artist(s)	End Date	Genre	Note(s)
Ginger	Dudley Watkins, Bob McGrath	1990		The original cover star of the comic. It was on the cover until 1961 before being replaced by Pop, Dick and Harry, it regained the cover spot in 1964 and remained there until 1987.
Bushwhacker	Bill Holroyd, Terry Patrick	1964	Adventure	Four separate series, last of which was named Spacewhacker. The strip also appeared in Buddy
Mick on the Moon	Ken Hunter	1957	Adventure	
Lone Wolfe	Ron Smith	1958	Adventure	
Pop, Dick and Harry	Tom Bannister, Peter Moonie, Brian Walker	1990		Cover star from 1961 to 1964. Continued in the Beezer and Topper
Calamity Jane	Hugh Morren	1960		
Nosey Parker	Allan Morley	1956		The character was originally featured in The Rover in 1925. It also featured in The Sunday Post and Sparky.
Nero and Zero	Allan Morley	1956		The character was originally featured in The Wizard in 1930. It also featured in The Sunday Post and Buzz.
The Hillys and the Billies	George Martin, Henry Davies	1990		Three separate series which were reprinted as Ruffies and Tuffies in The Victor. This strip was surprisingly violent.
Big Ed	Hugh Morren	1956		
Charlie Chick	Bill Ritchie	1956		
Shorty	Brian White	1956		
Smart Alice	George Martin	1956		
The Banana Bunch	Leo Baxendale, Bill Hill, Robert Nixon, Barrie Appleby	1990		Continued in the Beezer and Topper and was reprinted in Dandy Xtreme in 2004 and 2010.
Mumbo and Jumbo	Unknown/George Drysdale	1956		
The Kings of Castaway Island	James Walker	1969	Adventure	Four separate series, in which the final series was a reprint.
Baby Crockett	Bill Ritchie	1990		Continued in the Beezer and Topper. It also appeared in Bimbo and Little Star.

== 1957 ==
Strip Title	Artist(s)	End Date	Genre	Note(s)
Yellow Eye, The Jungle Kitten	Michael Darling	1957	Adventure	
Bucko's Flying Bedstead	Ron Forbes	1957	Adventure	
Hornet Wilson and his Educated Insects	Ken Hunter	1958	Adventure	

== 1958 ==
Strip Title	Artist(s)	End Date	Genre	Note(s)
Cap'n Hand	Leo Baxendale, David Law, George Drysdale, Michael Barratt	1960		
The Blood Brothers of the Spanish Main	Ron Smith	1958	Adventure	
Buffalo Boy	Victor Peon	1959	Adventure	
Caesar	William Timym	1959		Appeared in the Sunday Graphic
Colonel Blink	Tom Bannister, George Martin	1990		Spinoff strip Blinky appeared in the Beezer and Topper
Oliver's Travels	George Martin	1959		

== 1959 ==
Strip Title	Artist(s)	End Date	Genre	Note(s)
The Survivors	Ken Hunter	1959	Adventure	
The Showboat Circus	Paddy Brennan, David Sutherland	1970	Adventure	Three separate series, in which the last series was a reprint.
Merry Hood and his Robbin Men	George Martin	1960		
Blind Jumbo	James Walker	1960	Adventure	
Miguel the Matador	Bob McGrath	1960		Also appeared in Valiant
Wooly West	Bill Ritchie	1960		
The Black Sapper	Jack Glass	1961	Adventure	Originally appeared in The Rover in 1929 as a prose story about a thief who stole the Crown Jewels with his tunnelling machine called the Earthworm

== 1960 ==
Strip Title	Artist(s)	End Date	Genre	Note(s)
The Badd Lads	Malcolm Judge, John Dallas, Mervyn Johnston, John Geering	1990		Appeared in the Beezer and Topper
The Jellymen	Ken Hunter	1984	Adventure	Five separate series, in which the fourth series was a reprint.
My Pal Wonderwing	Terry Patrick	1960	Adventure	
Hank the Yank		1960		Reprint from USA

== 1961 ==
Strip Title	Artist(s)	End Date	Genre	Note(s)
The Log of the S.S. Mary Anne	Albert Holroyd/Michael Darling	1962	Adventure	
The Mob Next Door	Bill Hill	1967		

== 1962 ==
Strip Title	Artist(s)	End Date	Genre	Note(s)
The Numskulls	Malcolm Judge, Tom Lavery, Jimmy Glen, Steve Bright	1990		Appeared in the Beezer and Topper. Appeared in The Beano after the Beezer and Topper closed.
Cicero's Cat	Al Smith	1963		
Mutt and Jeff	Al Smith	1963		Originally featured in the San Francisco Chronicle in 1907
The Gobbles	Leo Baxendale	1964		A group of vultures always on the lookout for food, which is similar to The Three Bears.

== 1963 ==
Strip Title	Artist(s)	End Date	Genre	Note(s)
The Iron Eaters	Ken Hunter, Sandy Calder	1974	Adventure	Two separate series about sponges from space that ate iron, causing all kinds of problems

== 1964 ==
Strip Title	Artist(s)	End Date	Genre	Note(s)
Tommy Taylor's Toybox	Leo Baxendale, Bill Hill, John Geering	1984	Adventure	Two separate series released in 1964 and 1981 respectively.
Dreamy Dick	Unknown	1964		
Taffy the Tearaway Terrier	James Walker	1964	Adventure	
Copy Cat	Bob McGrath	1964		
The Fighting Finlays	Ron Smith	1964	Adventure	
The Phantom Flyer	Terry Patrick	1964	Adventure	
The Space Kids	Ron Smith	1977	Adventure	Two separate series, in which the second one was a reprint.
Little Mo	Bob McGrath	1990		Appeared in the Beezer and Topper
Young Sid the Copper's Kid	George Martin	1989		
My Pal Ropey	Albert Holroyd	1987	Adventure	Two separate series released in 1964 and 1986 respectively

== 1965 ==
Strip Title	Artist(s)	End Date	Genre	Note(s)
The Scarlet Spider	Ken Hunter	1966	Adventure	

== 1966 ==
Strip Title	Artist(s)	End Date	Genre	Note(s)
Uncle Dan the Medicine Man	Bill Holroyd/Albert Holroyd	1987	Adventure	Two separate series, in which the second one was a reprint. It was also reprinted in Buzz.
Space Patrol	Terry Patrick	1967	Adventure	Based on the 1962 television series of the same name

== 1967 ==
Strip Title	Artist(s)	End Date	Genre	Note(s)
Mr Flippy	Ken Hunter	1969	Adventure	There are two separate series, in which the second one was a reprint.
Smiffy	Bill Ritchie	1988		Unrelated to the character from The Bash Street Kids. This Smiffy was a boy who liked getting dirty
Roly Poly	Bill Hill	1969		
Wrinkle and Twinkle	Bill Hill	1986		There are two series, in which the second one was a reprint in 1986.
Dee for Danger	Ron Smith	1967	Adventure	

== 1969 ==
Strip Title	Artist(s)	End Date	Genre	Note(s)
General Jim	Ken Hunter	1982	Adventure	There are two series, in which the second one was a reprint in 1981.
Black Bun	Bill Hill	1975		
Hocus Pocus	Albert Holroyd	1970	Adventure	
Dicky Burd	Bill Ritchie	1978		

== 1970 ==
Strip Title	Artist(s)	End Date	Genre	Note(s)
Tommy's Tick-Tock Twin	Albert Holroyd	1971	Adventure	
Mighty Mik	Ken Hunter	1985	Adventure	There are two series, in which the second one was a reprint in 1985.

== 1971 ==
Strip Title	Artist(s)	End Date	Genre	Note(s)
Barney's Barmy Army	Ken Hunter	1985	Adventure	There are two series, in which the second one was a reprint in 1985.
Willie Wink the Missing Link	Albert Holroyd	1972		
The Gobblers	Watson Kennedy	1972	Adventure	

== 1972 ==
Strip Title	Artist(s)	End Date	Genre	Note(s)
The Barkers	Watson Kennedy	1974		
Hairy Dan - Football Fan	Bill Ritchie	1981		

== 1974 ==
Strip Title	Artist(s)	End Date	Genre	Note(s)
March of the Giants	Sandy Calder	1975	Adventure	
Fiddlesticks	Ken Hunter	1975		
Dan McGlue	Malcolm Judge	1974		
Blubba	Watson Kennedy	1976	Adventure	

== 1975 ==
Strip Title	Artist(s)	End Date	Genre	Note(s)
Krunch, the Monster from the Deep	Frank McDiarmid	1976	Adventure	
Joey's Ark	Paddy Brennan	1976	Adventure	
Pedro, the Pesky Parrot	Bill Hill	1976		

== 1976 ==
Strip Title	Artist(s)	End Date	Genre	Note(s)
Jest a Minute	Bill Hill/Ken H. Harrison	1979		Originally in Cracker
Billy the Kid	Gordon Bell	1979		Originally in Cracker
Joe Soap	John Dallas	1979		Originally in Cracker, the series later appeared in a further two issues in 1987.
Little Orror	David Easington	1979		Originally in Cracker
Young Foo, the Kung Fu Kid	Brian Platt	1979		Originally in Cracker
Scrapper	Tom Lavery/Bill Hill, Steve Bright/Gordon Bell	1988		Originally in Cracker
Iron Hand	Paddy Brennan	1979	Adventure	Originally in Cracker

== 1978 ==
Strip Title	Artist(s)	End Date	Genre	Note(s)
Mr. Licko and his Lollipops	Ken Hunter	1981	Adventure	

== 1979 ==
Strip Title	Artist(s)	End Date	Genre	Note(s)
Plug	Vic Neill/David Gudgeon	1986		Originally in Plug
Hugh's Zoo	Gordon Bell	1986		Originally in Plug
First Ada	Gordon Bell	1981		Originally in Plug
EcBagoom	Albert Holroyd	1981		Originally in Plug
Antchester United	John Geering	1981		Originally in Plug

== 1981 ==
Strip Title	Artist(s)	End Date	Genre	Note(s)
Saucy Sue	David Gudgeon	1987		
Hungry Hoss	Bill Ritchie	1987		
The Munchers	Gordon Bell	1986		

== 1983 ==
Strip Title	Artist(s)	End Date	Genre	Note(s)
Grotty Gables, the Funniest Hotel in Town	Albert Holroyd	1984		

== 1984 ==
Strip Title	Artist(s)	End Date	Genre	Note(s)
The Wallies of Winkle Street	David Gudgeon	1987		
Beefy Dan, the Fast Food Man	John Geering	1986		

== 1986 ==
Strip Title	Artist(s)	End Date	Genre	Note(s)
Tuff and Tiny	Gordon Bell	1989		
Paw, Maw and Porky	John Geering	1989		Title was changed to Porky in 1988

== 1987 ==
Strip Title	Artist(s)	End Date	Genre	Note(s)
True Brit	Robert Nixon	1988		Was the comic's cover star
Twitt Hall	John Geering	1988		
Photo Funnies	Gordon Bell	1988		
Clockwise Cartoons	Gordon Bell/George Martin	1990		

== 1988 ==
Strip Title	Artist(s)	End Date	Genre	Note(s)
Count Spatula	Gordon Bell	1988		
Club 5	Barrie Appleby	1990		Beezer's own version of The Dandy's Cuddles and Dimples
The Beezers	Bob Dewar	1989		
Pam	Bill Ritchie	1989		
HeadHamster	Glynn Clark	1989		
Night 'n' Gale	Henry Davies	1989		
The Beezer Babies	Bob Dewar	1990		

== 1989 ==
Strip Title	Artist(s)	End Date	Genre	Note(s)
Adrian the Barbarian	Sid Burgon	1990		Was the comic's cover star. Continued in the Beezer and Topper, and was reprinted as Olaff the Madlander in The Beano
Geezer	Robert Nixon	1990		Continued in the Beezer and Topper, and similar to The Beano's Roger the Dodger
Phoot and Mouse	Tom Paterson	1990		
Man Saturday	Gordon Bell	1989		
Scratcher	Bill Ritchie	1990		Spin-off featuring cat from the Pam strip. It appeared in the Beezer and Topper.
Sting	Bob Dewar	1990		Continuation of the Beezers, and later continued in the Beezer and Topper
Adrian's Fables	Robert Nixon	1990		It featured Adrian in Adrian the Barbarian
Wabits	Gordon Bell	1990		Continued in the Beezer and Topper.

== See also ==
- The Beano
- List of Beano comic strips
- List of Beano comic strips by annual
- The Dandy
- List of Dandy comic strips
- The Beezer
- List of Beezer and Topper comic strips
