= 1960 in comics =

Notable events of 1960 in comics.

== Events and publications ==
=== January ===
- January 16: The first issue of the British girls' comics magazine Judy is published. It will run until 1991.
- January 30: The first issue of the British girls' comics magazine Princess is published. It will run until 16 September 1967 when it merges with Tina to become Princess Tina.

=== February ===
- February 4: In René Goscinny and Morris' Lucky Luke story Sur la piste des Dalton the dog Rantanplan makes its debut.
- February 18: in Spirou, first chapter of L’ombre du Z, by Greg and Franquin.
- February 29: Bil Keane's The Family Circus makes its debut.

=== March ===
- March 10: In the Italian Disney magazine Topolino Romano Scarpa's Mickey Mouse story The Chirikawa Necklace is published, which marks the debut of Melinda Mouse and Trudy Van Tubb. In the same issue, Uncle Scrooge's Money Rocket by Carlo Chendi and Luciano Bottaro is published: the first episode of the so-called “Saga of Rebo” (continued in the 1990s). The evil alien, created by Cesare Zavattini in Saturno contro la terra, becomes part of the Duck universe.
- March 24: The fourth Le Vieux Nick story is prepublished in Spirou. Halfway the story Barbe-Noire makes his debut.
- March 30: in Le Journal de Tintin, first chapter of Route de nuit, by Jean Graton.
- March: Gardner Fox introduces the Justice League in the 28th issue of The Brave and the Bold.
- In Uncle Scrooge, Hound of Whiskerwiles by Carl Barks.

=== April ===
- April 20: The British comics magazine Express Weekly publishes its final issue and changes its name to TV Express Weekly.
- April 25: In Charles M. Schulz' Peanuts Lucy van Pelt hugs Snoopy and first utters the phrase: "Happiness is a warm puppy.".

=== May ===
- May 9: first strip of Professor Phumble, by Bill Yates.
- May 28: The first issue of the British comics magazine Buster is published. In its first issue Bill Titcombe's Buster Capp makes its debut, a spin-off of Reg Smythe's Andy Capp. The magazine will run until 4 January 2000.
- May 29: The final episode of Warren Tufts' Lance is published.
- In Star-Spangled war stories, The War that Time Forgot, by Robert Kanigher and Ross Andru, first apparition of Dinosaur Island.

=== June ===
- June 1: In Le Parisien liberè, the first chapter of the Lucky Luke story Les Dalton courent toujours, by René Goscinny and Morris starts serialisation.
- June 16: First issue of the Italian western series James Dyan (Editoriale Dardo), written by Renzo Barbieri and drawn by Edgardo Dall’Acqua; the protagonist is a cowboy with the James Dean’s face.
- June 16: In Topolino, The Washed-Up Witch, by Luciano Bottaro and Carlo Chendi is first published. The story introduces the antagonism between Witch Hazel and Goofy, unshakably skeptic about magic, the theme will be often reused by the Italian Disney authors later.

=== July ===
- July 14: In Spirou, first chapter of A l’ombre des derricks, by Goscinny and Morris.
- July 24: In the Italian Disney comics magazine Topolino, The Last Balaboo by Romano Scarpa is published, which marks the debut of Brigitta McBridge.
- In the second issue of John Broome and Gil Kane's Green Lantern the Guardians of the Universe make their debut.

=== August ===
- August 11 : in Pilote, first chapter of Asterix and the golden sickle, by Goscinny and Uderzo.
- August 18: Willy Vandersteen launches his spin-off Jerom.
- August 21: The final episodes of Al Posen's Jinglet and Sweeney & Son are published.
- August 25: The final issue of the French girls' comics magazine La Semaine de Suzette is published.
- Rawhide Kid (1955 series), with issue #17, revived by Marvel.
- Harvey Kurtzman publishes his satirical magazine Help!, which will run for five years.

=== September ===
- September 1: Joe Simon publishes the first issue of the American satirical comics magazine Sick, which will run until 1980.
- September 11:In Topolino, The lentils from Babylon, by Romano Scarpa; the Beagle Boys get, legally, the whole of Uncle Scrooge’s patrimony.
- September 15: Andries Brandt's Holle Pinkel makes its debut. It will run until June 11, 1963.
- September 22: In Tintin, first chapter of The time trap, by Edgar Pierre Jacobs.
- The first issue of the French satirical magazine Hara-Kiri is published, which will offer room for countless subversive French and foreign cartoonists. It will be banned three times during its decade run. In 1970 it changes its name to Charlie Hebdo.
- Warren Satler revives Crockett Johnson's Barnaby for two years, until 14 April 1962.
- In Italy, first issue of the magazine of adventure comics Rin Tin Tin & Rusty (Editoriale Cenisio).

=== November ===
- November 7: The first episode of Lee Holley's comic strip Ponytail is published. It will run until 16 October 1988.
- November 12: David Law's Corporal Clott makes its debut in The Dandy.
- November 24: In Tintin magazine, the first episode of the Michel Vaillant episode Le 13 est au départ, by Jean Graton is published, in which Michel Vaillant meets his future wife (Françoise Latour) and his greatest rival (Bob Cramer) for the first time.
- November 28: The first episode of Peter Pan’s Christmas Story by Frank Reilly and Manuel Gonzales is published, the first of the Disney Christmas Stories.

=== December ===
- December 15: Peyo's Benoît Brisefer makes its debut.
- Frank Dickens publishes his comic strip Oddbod in The Sunday Times, which already features the character after whom the series will be retitled the next year: Bristow. It will become one of the longest-running comics series drawn by one and the same single author.
- Cancellation of Al Fagaly's Super Duck.

=== Specific date unknown ===
- Belgian comic publisher Dupuis brings out the Gaston Lagaffe comic Gaston by Andrè Franquin and Jidehem, an anthology of the best gags in the series so far. Yet the album is poorly edited and has a limited circulation. Today, its rarity makes it one of the most valuable Belgian comic books.
- In Le Parisien liberè, the Lucky Luke story Les Dalton courent toujours, by René Goscinny and Morris, is published.
- The final episode of Jostein Øvrelid and Hallvard Sandnes's long-running science fiction series Ingeniør Knut Berg på eventyr is published.

== Births ==
=== January ===
- January 16: Steve Erwin, American comic artist (Checkmate, Gunfire), (d. 2023).
- January 31: Grant Morrison, Scottish comic book writer (DC Comics).

=== September ===
- September 16: Mike Mignola, American comic book artist and writer (Baltimore, Batman, Hellboy).

=== October ===
- October 9: Maddie Blaustein, American comic writer (Milestone Media), (d. 2008).

== Deaths ==
=== January ===
- January 8: Jan Fischer, Czech comics artist (Rychlé šípy), dies at age 52.
- January 26: Riley Thomson, American animator and comics artist (Disney comics, Mickey Mouse comics), dies at age 47.

=== February ===
- February 7: Jim McArdle, American comics artist (Dr. Bobbs, Davy Crockett), dies at age 60.
- February 16: Norman Pett, British comics and erotic artist (Jane), dies at age 69.

=== March ===
- March 6: Gene Ahern, American comics artist (Our Boarding House, The Squirrel Cage, Room and Board), dies at age 64 from a heart attack.

=== May ===
- May 7: Leo O'Mealia, American sports cartoonist and comic artist (Wedlocked, In Jungleland A.K.A. Jungle Definitions), dies at age 76.
- May 27: James Montgomery Flagg, American painter, illustrator and comics artist (Nervy Nat, A Momentary Qualm), dies at age 82.

=== June ===
- June 10: Al Posen, American comics artist (Them Days Is Gone Forever, Jinglet, Sweeney & Son), dies at age 65.

=== August ===
- August 9: Tihamer Czemicsky, Hungarian graphic artist, comics artist, poster designer, painter and writer (Pipi), dies at age 56.
- August 15: Jefferson Machamer, American actor, screenwriter and comics artist (High Hat, Petting Patty, Past Performances, Gags and Gals, Nifties, Simple Sylvia, Hollywood Husband, The Baffles, Today's Laugh), dies at age 59.
- August 31: Edgar Martin, sometimes nicknamed Abe Martin, American comics artist (Boots and Her Buddies), dies at age 62.
- Specific date unknown: Jorge, Spanish comics artist (Doña Urraca), dies at age 38.

=== September ===
- September 5: Allan Morley, British comics artist (Nero and Zero, Freddie the Fearless Fly, Hungry Horace, Keyhole Kate), dies at age 75.

=== October ===
- October 10: Inez Townsend, British-American comics artist, illustrator and singer-songwriter (Gretchen Gratz, Snooks and Snicks), dies at age 82.

=== November ===
- November 2: Wilprand, AKA Floris Jansen, Dutch illustrator and comic artist (Episode Editie, Havenkwartier, Boeddha op Borneo, Wolvenserie), dies at age 48.
- November 16: Ray Perry, American comic artist and editor (Mr. District Attorney, art editor for National Comics Publications), dies at age 84.

=== December ===
- December 9: Gunila Stierngranat, Swedish comics artist (Lila Lena och Jon Blund, Lille Göran och Jon Blund, Lasseman och Hans Vänner, Snövit, Morfars Barndomsminnen, Eva-Maria och Ingegegerd), dies at age 58.

=== Specific date unknown ===
- Carlos Clemen, Argentine comics artist (Pepe Bujía), dies at an unknown age.

== First issues by title ==
- Buster (IPC Magazines, May 28)
- Green Lantern vol. 2 (DC Comics, July)
- Help! (Warren Publishing, August)
- Justice League of America (DC Comics, October/November)
- Richie Rich (Harvey Comics, November)
- Wendy the Good Little Witch (Harvey Comics, August)

== Initial appearances by character name ==
=== DC Comics ===
- Amazo, in The Brave and the Bold #30 (June)
- Aqualad, in Adventure Comics #269 (February)
- Arrowette in World's Finest Comics #113 (November)
- Atomic Knight, in Strange Adventures #117 (June)
- Captain Boomerang, in Flash #117 (December)
- Colossal Boy, in Action Comics #267 (August)
- Snapper Carr, in The Brave and the Bold #28 (February/March)
- Cave Carson in The Brave and the Bold #31 (September)
- Clock King, in World's Finest Comics #111 (August)
- Despero, in Justice League of America #1 (October)
- Danny the Dummy, in Batman #134 (September)
- Elongated Man, in Flash #112 (May)
- Guardians of the Universe, in Green Lantern vol., 2 #1 (July)
- Professor Ivo, in The Brave and the Bold #30 (June)
- Justice League of America, in The Brave and the Bold #28 (February/March)
- Thomas Kalmaku, in Green Lantern vol. 2, #2 (October)
- Kite Man, in Batman #133 (August)
- Kryptonite Man, in Superboy #83 (September)
- Lyla Lerrol, in Superman #141 (November)
- Multi-Man, in Challengers of the Unknown #14 (June–July)
- Puppet Master, in Green Lantern vol. 2, # 1 (July–August)
- Reep Daggle, in Action Comics #267 (August)
- Sea Devils, in Showcase #27 (August)
- Starro, in The Brave and the Bold #28 (February/March)
- Streaky the Supercat, in Action Comics #261 (February)
- Trickster, in Flash #113 (June–July)
- Zebra-Man, in Detective Comics #275 (January)

=== Marvel Comics ===
- Abominable Snowman, in Tales to Astonish #13 (November)
- Chondu the Mystic, in Tales of Suspense #9 (May)
- Dragoom, in Strange Tales #76 (August)
- Gorgilla, in Tales To Astonish #12 (October)
- Master Khan, in Strange Tales #77 (October)
- Molten Man-Thing, in Tales of Suspense #7 (January)
- Rawhide Kid, in Rawhide Kid #1 (Atlas Comics, March)
- Xemnu, in Journey into Mystery #62 (November)

=== Other publishers ===
- Benoît Brisefer, in Spirou magazine #1183 (mid-December)
- Captain Atom, in Space Adventures #33 (Charlton Comics, March)
- Corporal Clott, in The Dandy #990 (D. C. Thomson & Co. Ltd., 12 November)

=== Newspaper strips ===
- Jimmy Five, in Monica's Gang
- Willie Lumpkin, in syndicated strip created by Stan Lee and Dan DeCarlo
- Maggy, in Monica's Gang
