= Sparky (comics) =

British comic

Publication information
- Publisher: DC Thomson
- Schedule: Weekly
- Format: Ongoing series
- Publication date: 23 January 1965 – 9 July 1977
- No. of issues: 652

Sparky was a British comic published weekly by DC Thomson, that ran from (issue dates) 23 January 1965 to 9 July 1977 when it merged with The Topper after 652 issues. From 1965–1980 the comic published an annual entitled The Sparky Book. It was a DC Thomson comic, originally aimed at a slightly younger audience to The Beano and The Dandy later it was aimed at the same audience. It changed its name to The Sparky Comic in 1973.

== List of comic strips ==
Strips which featured in Sparky at some point during the course of its 12-year run included. All numbers refer to issues of Sparky.

Strip title	Artist	First appearance	Last appearance	Notes
Sparky		1	210	The adventures of a Golliwog style black boy who wore a grass skirt. The character was almost identical to the Sooty Snowball character that had appeared in the earlier Magic Comic. Sparky was the original cover story until replaced with The Moonsters.
The Moonsters	Bill Ritchie	2	199	Green aliens living on the moon. Originally on the back page, but soon became the cover story.
Dreamy Dave and Dozy Dora	Pamela Chapeau	1	204	A brother and sister who constantly dozed off and shared the same bizarre but vivid fantasy dreams.
Hungry Horace	George Drysdale	1	652	(originally from The Dandy) A boy who thought of nothing but eating.
Keyhole Kate	George Drysdale	1	488	(originally from The Dandy) She was a nosey girl with pigtails and glasses who spied through keyholes. Later moved back to The Dandy.
Joe Bann and his Big Banjo		1	138	
Freddie the Fearless Fly		1	91	Originally in The Dandy.
Jeff ye Jolly Jester		1	89	
Hockey Hannah		1	76	
Minnie Ha-Ha		1	55	
Flubberface		1	59	
Hairy Dan		1	29	This strip was originally in The Beano.
Dick Turpentine		1	12	
Nosey Parker		1	139	The character was originally featured in The Rover in 1925. It also featured in The Sunday Post and The Beezer.
Stoneage Steve		1	5	
Pansy Potter	John Geering	2	567	Revival of a strip from The Beano.
Frosty McNab		2	4	Revival of a strip from The Beano.
Cuckoo in the Clock		2	139	
Black Jack the Chimney Sweep		2	5	
Grandma Jolly and her Brolly		2	17	
Peter Piper		3	652	A boy with magic pipes which could make objects and pictures alive, revival of story from The Magic Comic.
Winnie the Witch		25	122	A strip with the same name appeared in The Beano.
The Slowdown Express		25	137	
Fireman Fred		63	131	
Granny Cupp and her Flying Saucer		80	139	
My Grockle and Me	George Drysdale	86	140	Revival of a strip from The Rover and later The Dandy
Harry Carry		123	209	
Meddlesome Matty		140	224	Originally in The Dandy. A girl whose meddling always got her into trouble.
Deputy Dawg	James Malcolm	140	165	Based on the Terrytoons cartoon.
Snapshot Sid		140	191	
Tom Tardy		140	175	
Charlie Chutney		141	209	Originally a 1940s Dandy Character.
Big Billy Bigg		161	243	Belgian import, known as Jerom. Drawn by Eduard De Rop.
The Snooks		166	205	Belgian Import, known as De Familie Snoek. Drawn by Eduard De Rop.
Clever Claire		170	178	Belgian Import, known as Kari Lente. Drawn by Bob Mau.
Cheating Charley		192	210	
John Bulldog/Barney Bulldog	Bill Ritchie	200	528	Similar to Biffo the Bear and the third cover strip. Name changed to Barney Bulldog in issue 211 1 February 1969.
L-Cars	Bill Hill	205	652	Two incompetent policemen named Cedric and Frederic (the name comes from the contemporary show Z-Cars, but with a pun on learning 'L-plates')
Spoofer McGraw	Gordon Bell	206	652	"He tells tall tales", who continually gave outrageous explanations for the origins of tractors, mummies etc. to his gullible duffelcoat-wearing friend Bo. 643–652 were reprints.
Esky Mo		211	259	An Eskimo boy living at the North Pole.
Harry Presto		211	224	The Conjuror's son – a boy who uses his magician dad’s hat to pull out assorted objects.
Sparky People		211	652	A semi-fictional office staff who produced Sparky. 647–652 are reprints.
Wyatt Twerp	Ron Spencer	211	298	The inept Wild West sheriff.
Helpful Henry	Hugh Morren	211	230	Revival of a strip from The Wizard, Dandy Monster Comic and The Beano. Male version of Meddlesome Matty.
I-Spy	Les Barton 1969–70. Brian Walker 1970–1972. John Fox 1974–1976.	211	586	He was a secret agent with a long coat which concealed hundreds of weapons and gadgets. Similar to a character from Smash! called The Cloak.
Cap'n Hood and his Merry Men	Ray Hamilton	212	231	
Kings of the Castle		230	652	The Kings lived in a castle and the 'Dirty Rascals' were forever trying to get in.
Puss 'n' Boots	John Geering	231	652	"they fight like cat and dog", an eternally warring cat and dog duo.
Sam's Snake		244	426	
Ali's Baba	Mal Judge	261	652	Early strips were called Ali and his Baba. An invisible guardian angel Ali, who lived on a cloud and wore a cape, following an unknowing toddler Baba at all times and protected him from harm. Continued in The Topper and reprinted in The Dandy as Jimmy's Green Genie in 2004.
I. Fly		262	426	
Rudolph the Red Coat Mountie		276	299	All the other mounties in the force had failed to catch master of disguise dangerous Dan McGurk, and so it fell to assistant cook Rudolph to get his man! Reprinted in 603–626
Trouble Bruin		280	314	
Ma Kelly's Telly	Les Barton, Jim Petrie	315	402	
Willie Getaway or will he not	Phillip Milar	316	499	A man who thinks he is a wanted criminal as he can't read the small print on the 'wanted' posters that he has in fact inherited a large fortune, spending each strip trying to escape 'capture' by people wanting the reward for finding him.
Tom Kat		323	401	
Captain Cutler and his Butler		397	426	A Victorian era explorer Egbert Cutler searching for the source of the river Bongo, and his polite but long-suffering manservant Crumbs. This strip was notable for including the writer and artist as off-panel characters; Crumbs would interact with them and request changes to the strip in order to assist the clueless Cutler.
Snip and Snap		403	499	Two dogs eternally conspiring to bite the visiting postman. Reprinted as "The Red Hot Chilli Dogs" in the Dandy Xtreme as of August 2007.
Dreamy Daniel		403	652	A boy with a rich internal fantasy life who easily confused his imagination with reality
Jumbo and Jet		427	455	Adventures of a mouse and an elephant.
Baron Von Reichs-Pudding		474	652	The flying Hun from vorld var von!
Herman's Horoscopes		490	602	
Thingummyblob	Albert Holroyd	500	652	A strip with the same title has recently been in The Dandy.
Superwitch		500	651	
Minnie the Tea Lady	Jim Petrie	501	648	
Ah! Choo!		545	650	
Some Mummies Do 'Ave 'Em		568	652	The final cover story. Title is a play on the sitcom Some Mothers Do 'Ave 'Em.
Planet of the Nirdles		578	642	
The Circus of P. T. Bimbo		581	652	

== List of Sparky adventure Strips ==
As well as featuring comic strips Sparky featured adventure strips, though fewer and fewer of these appeared later in the comic's life.

Strip title	Artist	First appearance	Last appearance	Notes
The Young Castaways		1	16	
Wee Tusky		1	42	Two series. First (1–22). Second (35–42). A text story of the same name also featuring an elephant appeared in the first Dandy Monster Comic.
The Kidnapped Kidds		1	15	
The Palace of Secrets		1	14	This was a prose story with a few illustrations not a comic strip.
Will O' the Well		15	59	Two series. First (15–25) was a text story. The Second (53–59) was a comic strip.
McGinty the Goat		17	29	
Kipper Feet		23	34	
Riddle of the Roughlands		25	34	
Lonely Wood		26	59	Two series. First (26–34). Second (57–59).
Raiders from the Red Planet		30	34	
Glipin the Lost, Lost Boy		35	49	
Year of the Vanaks		35	56	
The Flood that Mother Remembers		35	47	
Floating Along, Singing A Song		36	47	
The Downside Donkeys		43	52	
Lost Children of the Forest		48	55	
Quest of the Wandering Wingates		50	59	
Pocahontas		56	60	
Seven at One Blow		60	72	
Huffy, Muffy and Tuffy		60	74	
City under the Sea		60	79	
Children of the Secret Pool		61	76	
Rory, the Horse of Many Masters		62	74	
Boy in the Forest of Fear		73	83	
Klanky	Bob Webster	75	499	Five Series. First (75–87) called Big Klanky. From Second (141–160) onwards called Klanky. Third (211–239). Fourth (280–299) called Around the World with Klanky. Fifth (377–499) called Klanky. An alien robot who is befriended on earth by Ernie and Sue Huggins.
Police Horse Hadrian		75	85	
Balloon Family Robinson		77	139	Two Series. First (77–85). Second (138–139).
Prentice Pete		84	140	Two Series. First One-off in 84. Second (123–140),
Willy the Woeful Wizard		86	116	
Terry had a Little Pig		86	97	
Nine Hundred Years Ago		87	94	
The Horse with Wings		88	106	
Davey Spacer		95	240	Three Series. First (95–107) called Little Davey Spacer. Second (140–157) and called Davey Spacer in Giantland. Third (227–240) called Davey Spacer.
The Island from the Past		98	109	
Keepers of the Dancing Drums		107	122	
Invisible Dick	Tony Speer	108	652	Three Series. First (108–123). Second (182–499). Third (563–652) which were reprints. Originated in Rover comic in 1922 and was in first Dandy comic 1938. Sparky comic version changed the origin of Dicks invisibility from a Jar with invisible solution to a Torch with black beam that makes all it shines on invisible for a period of time.
The Lost Ponies of Thor		110	119	
Greedy Gus		117	127	
The Cave Kids		120	131	
The Lonely lad of Blue Lagoon		124	183	
Titch, the Pup that Grew and Grew		128	137	
David Copperfield		140	158	Adaptation of the book of the same name.
Big Ossie		141	155	
The Magic Sword		156	168	
The Floating Farrells		158	170	
Uncle Tom's Cabin		159	178	Adaptation of the book of the same name.
Blonderl the Wandering Minstrel		169	181	
South Seas Suzie		171	186	
The Old Curiosity Shop		179	198	Adaptation of Charles Dickens story of same name
The Captive Kidds		185	195	Unrelated to the earlier Kidnapped Kidds
Sacramento here we come		186	197	
Sailor Brown's Schooldays		196	210	
The Boyhood of Deadwood Dick		198	210	
The Coral Island		199	210	Adaptation of R. M. Ballantyne book of same name
The Jungle Ark		211	226	
Mr Bubbles	Pamela Chapeau & James Fox	240	652	A 'bubble imp' living in a plastic bottle similar to washing-up liquid. Each strip someone would squeeze it and he would grant three wishes. Two series first (240–546) and second was reprints from (627–652)
The Jungle Walkers		241	254	
The Misery King		255	260	
Bushboy		261	359	Two Series. First (261–275). Second (346–359).
Four Legged Fred		299	314	
The Mini-Martins		322	332	
Tess of the Taoki		356	363	
The Wild West Kids		364	376	
North Sea Oyl		587	592	Reminiscent of the film The Blob.

== See also ==
- List of DC Thomson Publications
