= Robbie Rebel =

British comic strip

- Author: Ken H. Harrison
- Current status/schedule: Terminated.
- Launch date: January 12, 2002; 24 years ago
- End date: 2008; 18 years ago
- Genre(s): Humor comics, Celebrity comics

Robbie Rebel was a British celebrity comics gag-a-day comic strip, which premiered in The Beano comic in issue 3104, dated 12 January 2002. Based extensively on Robbie Williams, who at that time was very popular, his creators aimed to make him the Dennis the Menace of the 21st Century: his adventures are set in a contemporary world of mobile phones, computers and music videos.

== Concept ==
His first appearance showed him being born 'seven years ago', and being smacked on the bottom by the nurse to start his breathing. Instead of crying, he giggles. This sets the tone of the strip: Robbie is a rebel who does nothing he is told (although he occasionally does as he's told if he can make a job hard for his parents or anyone else, for instance scrapping a whole kitchen for a compost heap, when his dad told him to find scraps in the kitchen for the heap). His appearance was a breath of fresh air to The Beano: he sported long jeans, school shoes and a T-shirt, usually with an animal motif on it giving the wrong sound for the animal (so the silhouette of a Duck going 'moo' etc.) and has "No way" written on the back of all of them. A second strip in the same issue as his debut introduced his dog, Defido, who, like his Master, is a rebel. Robbie's parents are shown to be relatively young and trendy, particularly his pretty blonde mother.

Robbie has had two girls going after him, both competing to make him their boyfriend. They are called Kylie Geriwall and Geri Minogue (a mix-up from the singers Geri Halliwell and Kylie Minogue) and Kylie won (eventually, seeing as he always rejected them). In the later reprints, Geri was renamed Cheryl. More recent strips saw Kylie become a rival to Robbie, and they no longer seemed to be in a relationship. It is one of the few instances where a Beano character seemed to fancy a girl. Other examples include Fred in Tom Paterson's Fred's Bed who fancies Hannah Montana.

Robbie is drawn by Desperate Dan artist Ken H. Harrison, and his clean drawing style immediately cemented the strips'popularity. Because of Ken's continuing work on Desperate Dan, Robbie did not initially appear as regularly as other characters such as Roger the Dodger or Billy Whizz. With Desperate Dan's revamp when the Dandy got a facelift in September 2004, both were drawn in the same style (as opposed to the 'old' Desperate Dan where Ken drew things more detailed). Following the decision to stop running new Desperate Dan strips in mid-2007, Harrison was able to concentrate entirely on Robbie, who was now able to appear on a weekly basis.

In the Beano Christmas special 2007, Robbie Rebel had a joint strip with The Riot Squad.

In February 2008, Robbie Rebel left The Beano after 6 years. It has been hinted that Robbie had a terrible accident when he crashed into a tree in his last comic appearance. The strip ended so that Harrison could take over Minnie the Minx. However, in the 25 September 2010 issue, there has been a reprint of the strip. Then, since the issue dated 13 November 2010, he started to appear regularly as a reprint for several months.
