= Big Eggo =

British comic strip character

- Character from The Beano

Publication information
- Star of: Big Eggo
- First appearance: Issue 1; (30 July 1938)
- Last appearance: Issue 3950; (1 September 2018)
- Appearance timeline: Issues 1 – 358, 3093, 3185, 3925 – 3950
- Creator(s): Reg Carter and R. D. Low
- Author(s): Uncredited; Lew Stringer
- Illustrator(s): Reg Carter (1938–1948); George Drysdale (1948–1949); Ken H. Harrison (2001); Lew Stringer (2018)

Also appeared in
- Beano works: The Beano Annual 1940–1942, 2019; The Magic-Beano Book 1943–1950

Big Eggo was a British comic strip series about an eponymous ostrich, published in the British comic magazine The Beano. He first appeared in issue 1, dated 30 July 1938, and was the first cover star. His first words in the strip were "Somebody's taken my egg again!" It was drawn throughout by Reg Carter.

== Background ==
When creating a new comic in his "big five" series, R. D. Low wrote a newspaper advert in The Daily Telegraph for new artists. He was certain that his new character would be a black-and-white animal which would stand out in a colourful world; an idea he similarly used for Korky the Cat in The Dandy. Reg Carter (who had originally published Mickey Mouse comics throughout the 1930s) responded in January 1938 with a few ideas and sketches. Carter and Low's eventual idea would be an ostrich that misplaced his eggs. In an exchange of letters, they planned to name him Oswald the Ostrich, but eventual editor George Moonie suggested the name should be changed to Big Eggo. (Note: George Moonie's suggestion was revealed at The Official 70th Birthday Exhibition in 2007, in celebration of the 70th anniversary of The Beano.) The ostrich became the first front cover star of the comic until he was replaced in 1948 by Biffo the Bear.

== Common plots ==
Many of Eggo's tales were about him looking for an egg he had misplaced, which would lead to a situation in which he would discover that the egg was not an ostrich egg; in one story, he stole an egg from a zoo and a penguin hatched out and another was about a monkey stealing his egg and replacing it with a crocodile egg.

Other stories would have him in a wacky situation, such as eating an alarm clock which alerts a fire station he walks past, or another where Eggo is caught in a hot air balloon after trying to stop a goat from eating the anchor rope. In some stories, he was also a zookeeper, and there were the stories in which he would be acting anthropromorphic, such as dog sledding, shopping, or walking pigs on a lead as if they were his pets.

== Declining appearances ==
When Biffo the Bear took over as the cover star, Big Eggo would appear on the front cover's masthead, but would appear inside The Beano with the other comics, such as Lord Snooty and Pansy Potter. In World War II, rationing forced comics to stop being published too frequently; The Beano would publish fortnightly until the end of the 1940s. Big Eggo, like many Beano strips, dedicated stories to encouraging young readers to help with the war effort, such as recycling paper; one story was about Big Eggo, bothered by flies, creating fly paper out of sheets covered in glue after he accidentally knocks the recycling into some glue baths. He would continue to have stories until 1949, and his front-cover masthead appearances would drop in 1954, being replaced by Dennis the Menace. The sudden disappearance of the stories was due to the death of Carter in April 1949, which was not revealed until 2008, although rumours surfaced weeks before that readers had fallen out of love with the character because he was a bird, not a mammal, and therefore did not relate to the audience, unlike Biffo, a bear. George Drysdale took over as artist for the strips after Carter's death until the series' conclusion.

On the 7th March 2018 Big Eggo returned, illustrated by Lew Stringer, to celebrate the 80th anniversary of the Beano. These comics were shorter, being 3 or 4 panels long. The strip ran throughout the year and finished when the anniversary was over.

== Cameos ==
Big Eggo would begin to reappear sporadically after the character left the masthead. The next time Eggo made a cameo in the comic was for the 2000th issue celebration at the top of the cover of the first Beano reprinted on the back page, saying "Ah! The good old days!".

A one-off strip called Lord Snooty's Day Out drawn by Ken H. Harrison reveals that he is living in the Beano Retirement Home, along with Jonah, Lord Snooty and Jack Flash. Two years later, Eggo would meet Gnasher and Gnipper for the 65th anniversary.

In 2006, Big Eggo was used as a villain for a feature-length Bash Street Kids story illustrated and written by Kev F. Sutherland. The story featured him and other discontinued Beano characters wanting to revert the magazine to when they were popular, but the Class 2B accidentally thwart the plan with the help of The Dandy's Keyhole Kate accidentally building a robot with the brain of Jonah.

He also made a surprise return to the Beano in issue 3925 in a three-panel strip for the start of a new miniseries, written and drawn by Lew Stringer, to tie in with the comic's 80th anniversary, which continued for 24 more issues until September. In one, he was joined by Blotty and 'Enry. He was also the only character from the first generation to appear on the front cover of the 2019 Beano Annual; his first story's gag was re-enacted on the back cover with Gnasher handing Walter a crocodile egg that hatches with the baby biting Walter's bottom. He appeared in the inner cover artwork with 254 other characters from The Beano's history and was in the time-travelling comic feature "Doctor Whoops!"
