= Buzz (DC Thomson) =

British comic book magazine

Publication information
- Publisher: D. C. Thomson & Co. Ltd
- Publication date: 20 January 1973 to 4 January 1975
- No. of issues: 103

Buzz was an A3 (broadsheet) British comic book magazine that ran from 20 January 1973 to 4 January 1975, when it merged with The Topper. Edited by Roy Patterson Buzz ran for 103 Issues.

Other staff that worked on the comic included Euan Kerr, who went on to edit The Beano for 20 years, and Garry Fraser, future editor of Classics from the Comics and the Fun Size Dandy. Notable artists included Ken H. Harrison and Gordon Bell.

== History ==
First published in January 1973 Buzz was an A3 size comic similar in style to The Beezer and The Topper. At the time of its publication, the publisher DC Thomson, were publishing five other weekly humour comics the aforementioned Beezer and Topper as well as The Beano and The Dandy. Buzz lasted roughly two years ending in January 1975 when it merged with the Topper. Six of Buzz's comic strips continued in The Topper: Fred the Flop, Big Fat Flo, Nobby, Jimmy Jinx and what he thinks, Sammy's Scribbles and Sleepy Ed. Of these Fred the Flop and Jimmy Jinx were the longest running continuing in the Topper until 1986 and 1989 respectively.

After the merger the Topper continued as Topper and Buzz from 11 January 1975 until November of that year when Buzz was removed from the title. As well as moving to the Topper one of Buzz's comic strips, Skookum Skool, moved to the new comic Cracker which started the same month that Buzz ended. Cracker has been described "more or less the same content-wise" as Buzz although with a couple of differences.

Comic strips from Buzz were reprinted in Classics from the Comics, which ran from 1996 to 2010, with the Buzz name appearing on the front cover for most issues.

== List of Buzz comic strips ==
These are in alphabetical order and all numbers refer to issues of Buzz.

Strip Title	Artist	First Appearance	Last Appearance	Notes
Big Bad Moggy	Peter Moonie	1	29	Not in 17,18,19. From 20 onward strip title changed to Moggy.
Big Fat Flo	Phil Millar	1	103	Not in 35 & 39. Continued in The Topper after the merger.
Billy the Kidder	Jimmy Glen / Watson Kennedy	1	19	
The Buzzies and the Fuzzies	Gordon Bell	5	103	Two groups of feuding creatures resembling Weebles; one group very hairy like Captain Caveman, the others with short buzzcuts. Not in 34,38,75,83,86,88,89,90.
Calamity Kate	George Martin	1	103	A girl who inadvertently broke things
Cookie	Tom Lavery	1	68	Not in 3,18, nor 32 to 67.
Fred the Flop	Tom Lavery	1	103	About an incompetent thief. Continued in The Topper after the merger.
Freeze	Terry Patrick	66	90	An adventure story
Good Knight	Bill Ritchie	17	102	Not in 30, 31, 34, 36 to 38, 40 to 53, 68, 77, 81, nor 83 to 101.
Gus the Galoot	J Edward Oliver	1	16	
Harum Scareum	Gordon Bell	1	56	About a rabbit Harum and a farmer's dog Scarum in conflict over the farm's carrots. Not in 30.
Hop, Skip and Jock	Malcolm Judge	1	103	About three boys whose strip consisted of large 'action' panels containing with numerous gags. Was the comic's only cover strip.
Jimmy Jinx And What He Thinks	Ken Harrison	1	103	About a boy with the metaphorical 'good angel' on one side of his head and a 'bad angel' on the other. Not in 16. Continued in The Topper after the merger.
Monty Moneybags	Jimmy Glen	1	52	Not in 24, 25, nor 42 to 49.
Nero and Zero	Tom Bannister	1	40	About two incompetent Roman guards to Julius Caesar.
Nobby	Bob McGrath	1	103	About a generic resourceful/mischievous boy. Continued in The Topper after the merger.
Olly's Occy	Phil Milar	1	29	About a boy and his octopus called Occy. Not in 19,20,21,22,23,26,27.
Postman Knox	Various Artists	4	101	Not in 5. Feature where reader's sent in jokes.
The Rooky Racers	Alan Rogers	62	103	A strip with a similar premise to the cartoon Wacky Races.
Sammy's Scribbles	Gordon Bell	18	103	Continued in The Topper after the merger.
Skookum Skool	Ken Harrison	1	103	A similar strip to The Bash Street Kids. Continued in Cracker.
Sleepy Ed The nap-happy chappie	John Aldrich	41	103	Continued in The Topper after the merger.
Spookum Skool	Ken Harrison	60	103	A spinoff of Skookum Skool but with ghosts. Also continued in Cracker.
Tich and Snitch	David Gudgeon	1	27	Anthropomorphic antics of a female elephant (‘Snitch’) and a male mouse (‘Tich’).
Top Tec	George Martin	57	103	
The Twitz of the Ritz	Bill Ritchie	1	61	
Uncle Dan the medicine man	Bill Holroyd/Albert Holroyd	91	103	Reprints from The Beezer. Another Adventure story.
The Whiteys and the Stripeys	Tom Lavery	30	65	Another 'feuding rivals' strip, this time with two marooned sets of pirates on adjacent islands
Wig and Wam	Arthur Martin	1	59	Two warring American Indians. Wam (the creepy older bad guy) and a young girl Wig. An unrelated strip of the same name (also about two American Indians) appeared in the first issue of The Dandy.
Willie the Wizard He's learning to spell	Ken Hunter	1	17	A strip about a wizard in training.

== Reception ==
Buzz was described by comics historian Graham Kibble-White as unoriginal, pointing to similarities between it and other DC Thomson comics as well as Hanna-Barbera cartoons.

== See also ==
- List of DC Thomson publications
