= Bimbo (comics) =

British comic book magazine

Bimbo was a British comic book magazine aimed at children in nursery school. It ran from 1961 until 1972 and was published by D.C. Thomson & Co. The magazine was named after its main feature Bimbo, which was a comic strip about a little boy.

The magazine was comparable to the magazine Little Star. Bimbo annuals continued to be published until the 1980s.

== Characters ==
- Bimbo drawn by Bob Dewar
- Tom Thumb drawn by Dudley D. Watkins from early issues of The Beano
- Patsy The Panda from the little girl's comic Twinkle.
- Beezer star Baby Crockett drawn by Bill Ritchie
- Dorothy and David a pair of twins
