= Jimmy and his Magic Patch =

British comic strip, 1944–1959

Jimmy Watson
- Adventure story character(s) from The Beano
- Jimmy Watson on the Jimmy Watson masthead.

Publication information
- Stars in: Jimmy and his Magic Patch
- Author(s): Uncredited
- Illustrator(s): Dudley D. Watkins (1944–1945, 1947); Paddy Brennan (1950–1951, 1959); Andy Hutton (issue 784)
- First appearance: Issue 222 (1 January 1944)
- Last appearance: Issue 903 (7 November 1959)
- Current status: Discontinued
- Character timeline: Issues 222 – 239, 265 – 299, 316 – 354, 416 – 452, 682 – 694 (reprints), 727 – 743 (reprints), 784 – 794 (reprints), 891 – 903

Also appeared in
- Beano works: The Beano Annual 1951, 1952, 1953, 1958, 1959, 1960, 1961, 1963; The Magic-Beano Book 1947, 1950
- DC Thomson works: Classics from the Comics (issue 148, 169)

Main Character
- Occupation: Student

Characters
- Crossover characters: Strang the Terrible

Jimmy and His Magic Patch was a British adventure story published in the British comics magazine The Beano in 1944. It was drawn by Dudley D. Watkins and later continued by Paddy Brennan until 1959. It starred schoolboy Jimmy Watson who time-travelled accidentally with a cloth patch on his school clothing.

== Synopsis ==
Jimmy Watson was walking to school when he rescued a cat from a Bull Terrier. He returns the cat to its owner, a Romani pensioner, who repays him by repairing his trousers with a patch from a carpet. Ever since, Jimmy accidentally time travels whenever he thinks about a historical event or time period. He has met Alfred the Great, Florence Nightingale, and George Stephenson, as well as Robin Hood, Sinbad the Sailor and William Tell. Future adventure strip character Strang the Terrible appeared in a two-part story in issue 233 before his series' debut in 240, and Strongarm the Axeman (from 1939) also appeared in issue 445.

Due to the patch, stories about Watson are set during schooltime or whenever he is travelling to or from campus. His school uniform is a cap and a striped tie with a suit, often coloured as a black jacket with blue trousers. The patch on the seat of his trousers is red.

== Publication history ==
Jimmy and his Magic Patch debuted in issue 222 with artwork by DC Thomson staff artist Dudley D. Watkins. The comics were drawn photorealistically and were published in a text comics format, a convention of The Beano's adventure story genre. Its appearance in the issues flited between linear and episodic, since Watson would eventually return to the present day and travel somewhere else. There were 14 two-parters and three three-parters, all with artwork by Watkins.

Watson's adventures had eight series that ended in issue 903, but it was secretly shorter than it seemed. An already hardworking artist, Watkins drew art for over 60 issues between 1944 and 1947, but these would be reprinted three times in 1955, 1956 and 1957. Frequent adventure comic artist Paddy Brennan drew for new adventures between issues 416 and 452, and issues 891 and 903. Andy Hutton redrew a Watkins-illustrated story for issue 784.

== Subsequent cameos and appearances ==
=== The Beano ===
As with most of the official run, Watson's series would be reprinted yet again: a two-parter from issues 327 and 328 for The Beano's 50th anniversary in The Dandy and The Beano: 50 Golden Years, in which Watson and Ali Baba are captured in a villain's cave. His "portrait" appeared in issue 2000's Hall of Fame.

Watson has also appeared in The Beano Annual-The Magic Comic hybrid in 1947 and 1950's edition, and the Beano Books of 1951, 1952 1953 and 1961, with Beano magazine reprints from 1958 to 1960, and 1963. Watson appeared on a double-page spread with 254 other Beano characters in 2019's edition.

=== DC Thomson ===
Jimmy and his Magic Patch was also reprinted frequently in Classics from the Comics.

== Reception and legacy ==
Cloth patches sewn onto damaged clothing were nicknamed having a "Jimmy and his magic patch" by some schoolchildren during the Second World War. "No underpants then, you had to sit in school until a repair could be done on them," a man explained. "When we went to school [during the Blitz] you were not allowed to wear long trousers until you reached the age of 14, short trousers were the normal thing to wear, and when your backside became thread bare you would have the hole covered up with what we called 'our jimmy and his magic patch'."
