= Ken Reid (comics) =

British comic artist and writer

- Born: 18 December 1919 Manchester, England, UK
- Died: 2 February 1987 (aged 67) Pendlebury, Greater Manchester, England, UK
- Areas: Cartoonist, Writer, Artist
- Notable works: Roger the Dodger; Jonah; Faceache; Fudge the Elf
- Awards: Best Writer and Best Artist, Society of Strip Illustration, 1978

Ken Reid (18 December 1919 – 2 February 1987) was a British comic artist and writer, best known as the co-creator of Roger the Dodger and Jonah for The Beano and Faceache for Jet (later appeared in Buster).

== Biography ==
Born in Manchester, Reid drew from an early age. At the age of nine he was diagnosed with a tubercular hip and was confined to bed for six months, during which time he drew constantly. He left school at thirteen and won a free scholarship to Salford Art School, but was expelled shortly before graduation after being caught in a local café when he should have been in class. He set himself up in a studio as a commercial artist, with little success until his father offered to act as his agent, and bluffed his way into an interview with the art editor of the Manchester Evening News. Reid was invited to submit ideas for a new children's section for the paper, and proposed The Adventures of Fudge the Elf, which first appeared in 1938 and ran until 1963, with a break from 1941 to 1946 when Reid was on National Service.

After a brief period contributing to Comic Cuts in the late 1940s, Reid proposed a full colour strip called Zooville to the Eagle. At the same time, Dundee-based publishers D. C. Thomson & Co., to whom he had been introduced by his brother-in-law, fellow cartoonist Bill Holroyd, invited him to contribute to The Beano. Their managing editor, R. D. Low, travelled to Manchester to discuss a proposed new strip, Roger the Dodger, with him. Reid accepted their offer, and Roger first appeared in The Beano on 18 April 1953.

Over the next decade he drew a number of successful strips for The Beano and its sister comic The Dandy, including Jonah, a strip about a jinxed sailor who brings bad luck to every ship he sails on, written by Walter Fearne. Reid later recalled how much Fearne's scripts made him laugh, but he made many visual alterations to them, cramming as many as thirty panels to a page.

In 1964 Reid and fellow artist Leo Baxendale left DC Thomson to work for Odhams Press' new titles Wham! and Smash, which allowed Reid to write as well as draw his strips. He began to explore his interests in "comic horror" and gruesome imagery, which would characterize the latter part of his career, with Frankie Stein and The Nervs, the latter of which he took over from Baxendale. Frankie Stein was a goofy take on Frankenstein's monster, about a harmless Frankie living with his mad scientist father, Professor Cube, at Mildew Manor. Frankie doesn't know his own strength and constantly ends up breaking everything. The Professor, meanwhile, is always scheming, and failing, to rid himself of Frankie. Frankie Stein ran in Wham! until the comic's cancellation in 1968.

One of his first strips for Smash!, in 1966, was The Queen of the Seas, a short-lived masterpiece of comic artistry. The two main characters were drawn in the likeness of comedians Stan Laurel and Oliver Hardy, and the strip's humour was based on their movies.

For Pow! in 1967, Reid created Dare-a-Day Davy, a character who could not resist dares set for him by readers. One episode, in which Davy was dared to resurrect Frankenstein's monster, was too gruesome for the editors and eventually saw print in the UK small press magazine Weird Fantasy, published by David Britton, in 1969.)

Reid's work on The Nervs in 1968–1969 turned it into an extremely surreal, even visceral, strip, achieving a rare level of hilarity and bawdiness. Its subversive presentation of comical horror again alarmed IPC's management.

In 1971 he created Faceache, a boy who could scrunge his face into any shape, for Jet, which later moved to Buster where it continued until Reid's death. Reid revived Frankie Stein in 1973 in Shiver and Shake; the strip was taken over in 1974 by Robert Nixon in Whoopee!, with Frankie ultimately becoming "editor" of Monster Fun.) Through the 1970s and 1980s he created horror-themed strips for a variety of comics, including Creepy Creations for Shiver and Shake, Martha's Monster Make-up for Monster Fun, and Tom Horror's World for Whoopee!. Martha's Monster Make-up was similar to Faceache – about a girl with a mysterious jar of magical cosmetic cream that temporarily transformed someone's face into that of a hideous monster. The strip survived the end of Monster Fun and moved to Buster in 1976.

Reid was named Best Writer and Best Artist by the Society of Strip Illustration in 1978.

On 2 February 1987, while drawing a page of Faceache at his home in Pendlebury, Greater Manchester, Reid suffered a stroke and died in hospital.

== Bibliography ==
=== Manchester Evening News ===
- The Adventures of Fudge the Elf (1938–1941, 1946–1963)

=== Comic Cuts ===
- Super Sam
- Billy Boffin
- Foxy

=== D.C. Thomson ===
- The Beano
  - Roger the Dodger, 1953–1959
  - Grandpa, 1955–1957
  - Jonah, 1958–1963
  - Jinx, 1963–1964
- The Dandy
  - Little Angel Face, 1954–1955
  - Bing-Bang Benny, 1956-1960
  - Ali Ha-Ha and the 40 Thieves, 1960–1963
  - Big Head and Thick Head, 1963–1966

=== Odhams/IPC ===
- Frankie Stein, Wham!, later Shiver and Shake, 1964–1968, 1973–1974
- Jasper the Grasper, Wham!, later Cor!!, 1965–1972
- Queen of the Seas, Smash!, 1966
- Dare-a-Day Davy, Pow!, 1967-1968
- The Nervs, Smash!, 1968-1969
- The Robot Maker, Cor!!, from 1970
- Faceache, Jet, later Buster, 1971–1987
- Wanted Posters, Whoopee!, 1974
- Martha's Monster Make-up, Monster Fun, 1975–1976, moved to Buster
- Tom Horror's World, Whoopee!, 1981–1983
