= Danny's Nanny =

Comic strip by David Mostyn

- Comic strip character(s) from The Beano

Publication information
- Creator(s): David Mostyn
- First appearance: Issue 2402 (30 July 1988)
- Last appearance: 2696 (19 March 1994)
- Also appeared in: The Beano Annual

Main Character
- Name: Danny's nanny
- Family: Danny (client)

Characters
- Regular characters: Danny's nanny, Danny

Danny's Nanny was a 1988-1994 comic strip in The Beano, drawn by David Mostyn. It features the young toddler and his nanny, a dog, which bore some resemblance to a sheep with a very long coat.

== Summary ==
First appearing in the Beano No. 2402, the 50th anniversary issue (30 July 1988), the first strip told the story of how Danny's mother decided that she needed a nanny for her "high-spirited" son. Having sent an applicant packing, Danny jumps on the back of a stray dog who throws him off and delivers him to his mother.

The strip appeared regularly until issue No. 2696 (19 March 1994). A frequent tagline was, "Danny's nanny has a wet nose, fur and a tail. That's because Danny's Nanny is a dog!"

== Character ==
In general, Nanny is a cynical, long-suffering dog who rarely speaks to humans in the strip. However, Nanny lets us know her thoughts via thought balloons. Apart from crisis scenarios, there is little love lost between Danny and Nanny, each of whom enjoys seeing the other played for a fool.
