= Fearless Fly =

Fearless Fly may refer to

- Fearless Fly, a 1960s American TV-cartoon character produced by Hal Seeger for the Milton the Monster show
- Freddy the Fearless Fly, a British comic strip originating in 1937
