= Winnie the Witch (comics) =

DC Thomson comic strip character

- DC Thomson comic strip character(s)

Publication information
- Stars in: Winnie the Witch
- Creator(s): James Clark (1948)

First appearance
- The Beano: Issue #326 (10 January 1948)
- Sparky: Issue #25 (10 July 1965)

Last appearance
- The Beano: Issue #343 (4 September 1948)

Characters
- Other characters: Chief Witch

Winnie the Witch was originally a DC Thomson comic strip in The Beano in 1948 and later on in Sparky from 1965 to 1967, featuring a witch named Winnie. The strip was first drawn in the Beano by Jimmy Clark, and in Sparky by Bernard Greenbaum.

== Synopsis ==
Winnie is a novice witch who would sometimes play mischievous tricks which mostly backfired. Also when trying to be helpful her poor mastery of magic gave undesired results, and she would often get into trouble with her boss the 'Chief Witch'.
