= Hairy Dan =

British comic strip character

- DC Thomson comic strip character(s)

Publication information
- Stars in: Hairy Dan
- Creator(s): Basil Blackaller
- Other contributors: Bill Richie; Bill McLoughlin

First appearance
- The Beano: Issue 1 (30 July 1938)
- The Beezer: 1972
- Sparky: 1965

Last appearance
- The Beano: Issue 297 (16 November 1946)
- The Beezer: 1981

Hairy Dan was a British comic strip character by Basil Blackaller originally published in the magazine The Beano Comic in the comic strip of the same name. It first appeared in issue 1 on 30 July 1938 and ran until issue 297.

== Story summary ==
Hairy Dan is an old man with a floor-length beard. His stories were about how this beard would save the day. Notable examples include issue 1 when Dan used his beard as a sail to win a boat race, and the first Beano Book when he pretended it was a horse's tail for a "horse tail contest".

To celebrate The Beano's 65th anniversary, Dan cameoed in a Ball Boy strip.

== Subsequent appearances ==
The character later appeared for a short time in Sparky in 1965. From 1972 until 1981, Hairy Dan - Football Fan appeared in The Beezer, where it was drawn by Bill Ritchie, and written by Bill McLoughlin. This strip differed from the original in that the character was unbearded and focused on football related humour. The Hairy in the title referring to the character's long scruffy hair.

== Similar Strips ==
A similar strip appeared in the first Dandy Monster Comic entitled Old Beaver's Brainwaves and also featured a man with a large white beard and using it to save the day.

The Dandy also featured a character called Whiskery Dick who was similar to Hairy Dan except where Dan had a long beard, Whiskery Dick had a large moustache.
