= David Mostyn =

David Mostyn may refer to:

- David Mostyn (British Army officer)
- David Mostyn (cartoonist)
