= Skookum Skool =

British comic strip

Skookum Skool was a British comic strip originally featured in the comics magazine Buzz from 1973 until 1975. The strip first appeared in the first issue of Buzz and was featured in every issue of the comic. The strip was drawn by Ken H. Harrison featured a class of six (later five) mischievous pupils similar in theme to The Beano comic strip The Bash Street Kids.

After Buzz merged with The Topper the strip reappeared in a new comic called Cracker under the new title of The Head Hunters of Skookum Skool. This newly titled strip was different from Skookum Skool because it now featured the Janitor advertising the post of Skookum Skool Headteacher (referred to as Head in the strip) and each week a new applicant would be appointed. The applicants came from differing backgrounds and from all over the world. All new headmasters, bar one, would have relinquished the post by the end of the strip.

The strip was originally part of the Skooldaze feature which occupied the four centre pages in the first twenty-four issues of Cracker alongside two spinoffs of Skookum Skool. This feature eventually disappeared from the comic and Skookum Skool was eventually dropped as well, appearing for the final time in issue 55 of Cracker.

== Spin-offs ==
- Spookum Skool (1974–1975) – This was similar to the original Skookum Skool strip except the pupils were all ghosts. This strip started in Buzz and went on to appear in Cracker until the end of the Skooldaze feature. This strip was also drawn by Ken Harrison.
- The Snookums (1975) – A spin-off which only featured in Cracker until the end of the Skooldaze feature. This strip involved a class full of a large number of nameless and unruly infants. The strip featured two panels setting up for the last panel which was much larger than the other two and featured a final chaotic scene. This strip was also drawn by Ken Harrison.

== Characters in the strip and its spin-offs ==
- Boss – The glasses wearing leader of the class.
- Pudding – The fat kid similar to Fatty in The Bash Street Kids.
- Streaky – a tall and skinny pupil.
- Dizzy – An idiot who wore a Dunce's cap similar to Smiffy from the Bash Street Kids.
- Susie – The only girl.
- There was also another pupil but he disappeared after issue 22 of Buzz.
- Teacher – a mortar board wearing teacher who disappeared when the strip became the Headhunters of Skookum Skool.
- Miss Bun – the teacher in The Snookums.
