= Jinx (comics) =

Jinx, in comics, can refer to:

- Jinx (DC Comics), a supervillain and enemy of the Teen Titans
- Jinx (Image Comics), a comic book series written and drawn by Brian Michael Bendis
- Jinx (G.I. Joe), a G.I. Joe character who has appeared in the comic book based on the franchise
- Jinx, a comic strip in The Beano featuring the sister of Jonah named Jinx.
- Jinx, a Marvel Comics character who was linked with the Darkhold Redeemers
- Jinx, a Marvel Comics character associated with Bishop
- Jinx Bushka, a comic strip character from Funky Winkerbean

== See also ==
- Jinx (disambiguation)
