= The Sparky Book (annual) =

Yearly children's comic book series

The Sparky Book was the name of the book that had been published every year since 1966, to tie in with the children's comic Sparky. Every Sparky book was dated with the first edition, published in 1966, being dated as the 1967 edition. Up until the Sparky book 1975, the annuals had the subtitle for boys and girls on them. Although Sparky merged with The Topper in 1977, the annuals continued for a few years afterwards with 1980 being the last Sparky Book. However, the 1981 edition of The Topper Book was titled The Topper and Sparky Book 1981, so it was a joint annual between both the Sparky and the Topper.
