= R. D. Low =

Scottish comics writer and editor

Robert Duncan Low (25 August 1895 – 13 December 1980) was a Scottish comics writer and editor. Employed by D. C. Thomson & Co., he was responsible for their line of comics, and, as a writer, co-created Oor Wullie and The Broons with artist Dudley D. Watkins.

== Biography ==
Low was born in Dundee. The son of Alexander Brown Low, a jute mill mechanic, and Maggie Wilson Low, he joined DC Thomson as a journalist in 1913 as an 18-year-old trainee and rose to become managing editor in charge of the children's publications department eight years later. Having launched the "big five" story papers Adventure (1921), The Rover (1922), The Wizard (1923), The Skipper (1930) and The Hotspur (1933), he developed a comic supplement for the weekly newspaper The Sunday Post, the "Fun Section" (1936). It included two comic strips in Scots vernacular he had co-created with Dudley D. Watkins, a staff illustrator on the story papers: The Broons, about a working-class Scottish family, and Oor Wullie, about a mischievous young boy (based on Low's son Ron), alongside Auchentogle, drawn by Chic Gordon, and strips by Allan Morley including Nero and Zero and Nosey Parker.

In 1937, as managing editor, he oversaw the launch of DC Thomson's first comic, The Dandy, edited by Albert Barnes, followed by The Beano, edited by George Moonie, in 1938. The Magic Comic, for slightly younger readers, followed in 1939 but folded in 1941 due to paper shortages. The next comic launched was The Topper in 1953. Also in 1953, Low co-created "Roger the Dodger", with artist Ken Reid, for The Beano.
