= Jon Rushby =

Comic artist

Jon Rushby is a comic artist best known for drawing Team Toxic for the Toxic! comic. He also drew the humorous Come to Beanotown for The Beano and Growing Paynes for The Dandy. He also drew for the first three issues of the British version of the Earthworm Jim comic.
