= Joe Soap =

Rhyming slang

"Joe Soap" is British rhyming slang denoting a foolish stooge or scapegoat, Joe being an ordinary person, with Soap as a rhyme for dope.

== History ==
The phrase appeared in a 1943 book of military slang by John Hunt and Alan Pringle: "Joe Soap, the 'dumb' or not so intelligent members of the forces. The men who are 'over-willing' and therefore the usual 'stooges'." The World War I song "Joe Soap's Army", sung to the tune of "Onward, Christian Soldiers", has the lyrics "Forward, Joe Soap's army, marching without fear, with our brave commander, safely in the rear."

== In popular culture ==
- The song "Blind Youth" by The Human League, released in 1979, contains the refrain: Blind youth, take hope/You're no Joe Soap/Your time is due/Big fun come soon!
- Joe Soap was a photographic comic series published in the British comic book Eagle, from number 12 (dated 12 June 1982) until number 45 (dated 29 January 1983). It was written by Alan Grant and John Wagner, with photography by Gary Compton.
- Another character of the same name appeared in Cracker and The Beezer.
- In 1994 Andrew Motion published a long poem with the title Joe Soap.
- In the 2012 Dredd movie, a Joe Soap poster can be seen on a billboard during a bike chase scene.
- Joe Soap was mentioned in chapter 17, page 125, of The Papers of Tony Veitch, the second book of William McIlvanney's Inspector Laidlaw trilogy: "One of those studio mock-up LPs of recent hits recorded by Joe Soap & Company was playing, authentic as a wooden penny. It belonged. Harkness wondered if that was why she wore her hair long: her ears were made of tin."
