= Billy Whizz =

Character in the UK comic The Beano

- Comic strip character(s) from The Beano

Publication information
- Stars in: Billy Whizz
- Creator(s): Malcolm Judge
- Other contributors: Barrie Appleby; Steve Horrocks; David Parkins; Vic Neill; Wilbur Dawbarn; Nick Brennan; Andy Fanton
- Current/last artist: Wayne Thompson; Danny Pearson
- First appearance: Issue 1139 (16 May 1964)
- Also appeared in: The Beano Annual; The Bash Street Kids
- Current status: Ongoing
- Schedule: Weekly

Main Character
- Name: Billy Whizz
- Alias(es): The World's Fastest Boy
- Family: Alfie Whizz (brother); Dad; Mum

Characters
- Regular characters: Alfie Whizz, Dad

Billy Whizz is a fictional character featured in the British comic The Beano, first appearing in issue 1139, dated 16 May 1964, when it replaced The Country Cuzzins. Billy, the title character, is a boy who can run extraordinarily fast. His speed often causes chaos yet at the same time his ability can prove useful. He also has a younger brother called Alfie Whizz of similar appearance. Alfie is usually shown as a normal boy but occasionally he is shown to be just as fast as his brother.

In strips up until the 1980s, Billy lives in Whizztown rather than Beanotown like most of the other regular characters, however, this later changed and more recent strips place him in Beanotown.

== Character history ==
=== Concept and creation ===
The strip was originated by Malcolm Judge, who had previously drawn Colonel Crackpot's Circus, and would go on to create several more popular strips, including Ball Boy, The Numskulls and The Badd Lads. Judge's style tended to be typified by a wide variety of styles in which Billy's speed was depicted, including trails of dust, motion blur, multiple copies of Billy in a panel, and more besides. Later artists tended to use a single, specific visual device to represent Billy's whizzing. Judge drew every single Billy Whizz strip until the mid-1980s, when other artists, including Barrie Appleby and Graeme Hill, began providing occasional fill-in strips, though Judge still drew the vast majority of the strips from the conception to 1989.

=== Changes in the 1990s ===
Upon Judge's death in 1989, Appleby acted as artist for a few weeks before Steve Horrocks took over as regular artist. Both Appleby and Horrocks drew in a style that was broadly similar to Judge, but slowly began modernising the strip. Horrocks continued as artist until late 1990, when he was succeeded by Beano newcomer David Parkins, who began a major overhaul of the strip, making the effects of Billy's speed more destructive to his surroundings, giving him a more laid-back attitude, and later introducing a rather alien-looking tracksuit.

Parkins acted as the main artist in this time, but Trevor Metcalfe and Vic Neill also drew occasional strips for the next few years; all three artists used a broadly similar design for Billy, but Metcalfe and Neill's strips featured a much more happy-go-lucky version of Billy. A reshuffle of the Beano's artists (coinciding with the comic's move to all-colour printing) saw Parkins leave the strip in 1993, and Neill became the main artist, upon which he began further tweaking Billy's appearance, the most notable change being that the two long hairs he had always been drawn with were turned into a thunderbolt. He continued to draw the strip until his death in January 2000, and Graeme Hall took it up afterwards.

=== Post-2000 ===
By March 2003, the strip's popularity had faded badly, and the comic's editors were giving serious consideration to dropping it. Instead, it was decided that the strip would be given a stay of execution, albeit under a new artist. Wayne Thompson took over from the following month. Thompson did another revamp of the strip, creating a version of Billy that was based on Malcolm Judge's work (and to a lesser extent, David Parkins' design of Billy), and gave a new life to the character and feel of the strip. However, due to his commitments with Jak for the Dandy, the strip was understudied again by Trevor Metcalfe, who, aided with a Wacom tablet, drew the strip in a mixture of his own and Thompson's style. Metcalfe later drew the strip full-time, gradually bringing the strip's artwork more in line with his early 1990s work, until his sudden departure from the comic in 2007, after which the Beano started running re-prints of the strips drawn by David Parkins.

This run of reprints continued for the next year (including a few early Trevor Metcalfe and Vic Neill strips along the way) until the comic's 70th anniversary issue, when Barrie Appleby returned to provide a new strip (this time drawn in his own style, as opposed to his 1980s work which followed Malcolm Judge's style). The strip then reverted to being reprints for the following year, mostly of Vic Neill's, with one Graeme Hall reprint in October 2009. At the end of that month a new permanent artist was appointed, namely Nick Brennan who had previously drawn Crazy for Daisy in The Beano, and Blinky in The Dandy.

In the Beano Annual 2008, Billy's story was drawn by Tom Paterson, and in the 2009 annual Wayne Thompson drew it. Tom Paterson again drew Billy in the 2010 annual, while Nigel Parkinson drew his strip in the 2011 annual, in the style of Vic Neill.

In some issues of the comic in the autumn of 2011, Billy appeared as the first strip in the comic – this slot is usually reserved for Dennis the Menace and Gnasher.

In November 2012, Wilbur Dawbarn took over as artist, returning the strip to its original style and removing Billy's tracksuit and bringing back the shorts and red T-shirt. In 2016, writing duties for the strip were taken over by Andy Fanton and Danny Pearson.

== Physical appearance ==
When the strip began, Billy simply wore a T-shirt and black shorts. In a late 1970s strip, Billy's dad sends him out to buy a new pair of trousers, supposedly to slow Billy down, but as he buys a pair of tracksuit bottoms this doesn't happen, though from that point Billy wore those trousers, of which originally had vertical stripes running down the sides before they were removed after a few strips for unknown reasons. A more dynamic change came in the early 1990s when he began to wear a black tracksuit marked with a lightning bolt. When depicted in colour, originally all the non-black areas of the tracksuit were in yellow, though soon all but the lightning flash was in red, and later the lightning flash turned red itself. The tracksuit itself also had vertical stripes on the sides of his tracksuit bottoms similar to the ones he began wearing in 1976, as well as an additional lightning bolt symbol on the back of his jumper, although the latter feature only mainly appeared in the strips drawn by David Parkins. By the time the comic transitioned to full colour, both the stripes and extra bolt were removed entirely, again for unknown reasons. Billy initially wore ordinary shoes but around the same time as the tracksuit was introduced he started to wear trainers, which are usually worn out very quickly by whizzspeed running, and as a result often have holes in the soles.

From the first strip, Billy sported a shaved hair cut with two long, antennae-like hairs sticking out at the top. In the 1970 Beano Annual, it is revealed that the reason why Billy, plus Dad and Alfie, always have this style is because they always get thrown out of the barber's before the last two hairs can be shaved off. After Vic Neill became artist, the two hairs morphed into a lightning flash, with no explanation given for this in the comic. This hairstyle was retained by Graeme Hall, but was later reverted to the original two hairs once Wayne Thompson took over. It has been revealed in some strips that Billy's hair is blond should it grow to full length.

== Personality traits ==
Billy is usually depicted as being rather less mischievous than the other Beano characters, and not going out of his way to harm or annoy others. Any trouble he causes is usually by accident, although this happens quite often due to Billy's whizzspeed. However, he does seem to have a fairly short temper; in the 1999 Beano Book he exploded in a rage after finding out that Alfie had a glass of ice during a water balancing race. He has been shown to be rather impatient, unable to sit still even for a film. Much like other Beano characters save for Dennis the Menace and The Bash Street Kids, he does not appear to have a set group of friends. His kind nature and good heart is occasionally taken advantage of by other Beano characters, especially that of Roger the Dodger and Dennis the Menace, an example being one strip in which he agrees to carry Roger's dodge books so he can slow down.

== Timeline ==
16 May 1964 Billy Whizz debuts in the comic. Issue No. 1139

17 April 1976 Billy starts wearing trousers instead of shorts. This is explained in a story where Billy's dad tells him to buy some trousers, in the hope that they will slow him down, but Billy chooses some tracksuit bottoms which don't slow him down. Issue No. 1761

27 January 1989 The final appearance of Malcolm Judge's Billy in the comic. Barrie Appleby draws the strip for the next few weeks, before Steve Horrocks takes over.

1990 David Parkins takes over as the full-time artist.

1991 Trevor Metcalfe starts drawing Billy as understudy to Parkins.

1992 Vic Neill also starts drawing Billy.

9 May 1992 Billy Whizz wears his new thunderbolt tracksuit for the first time in a story where he runs so fast in his new tracksuit that he is mistaken for a lightning storm. Issue No. 2599

1993 David Parkins quits drawing Billy, and Vic Neill takes over permanently, although Trevor Metcalfe still contributes occasional strips for the next year.

1993 Trevor Metcalfe provides the Billy Whizz strip for the Beano Annual 1995, which proves to be the last time he draws Billy for over a decade.

9 July 1994 Billy's hairstyle changes, with no explanation in the comic. Issue No. 2712.

2000 Vic Neill dies, and is replaced by Graeme Hall.

5 April 2003 Wayne Thompson takes over as Billy's artist. Issue No. 3168

2005 Trevor Metcalfe again starts drawing Billy, this time as Thompson's understudy, before later becoming permanent artist.

16 June 2007 The final regular new strip in the Beano drawn by Metcalfe. From the following week's issue, Billy's strip became reprint. Issue No. 3385

2 August 2008 Barrie Appleby draws a new Billy Whizz strip in the 70th birthday edition of the Beano, the first new strip in the comic for over a year. Issue No. 3443

31 October 2009 Nick Brennan takes over as artist and new strips start being printed. Issue No. 3507

10 November 2012 Wilbur Dawbarn replaces Nick Brennan as artist, reverting the character to his original image. Issue No. 3660

8 April 2019 Billy briefly dies in a strip, caused by colliding with a wall after going too fast. This was revealed to be a dream at the end of the strip, from a coma Billy was induced into. Issue No. 4104

== In other media ==
=== Video ===
- Billy appeared alongside other Beano stars in the 1994 straight-to-DVD movie, Beano Video. He was voiced by Gary Martin.

=== Theme parks ===
- Billy had his own ride at Chessington World of Adventures, a flying chair ride titled Billy's Whizzer, from the opening of Beanoland in 2000 until it was refurbished into Wild Asia in 2009.

=== Merchandise ===
- Robert Harrop designed a Billy Whizz figure featuring him inside a bumper car.
