= Mr. Meecher, the Uncool Teacher =

British comic strip

Mr Meecher, the Uncool Teacher is a British comic strip, published in the British comics magazine The Dandy. It debuted in the 3516th issue on 8 January 2011 and is written and drawn by Wilbur Dawbarn.

== Concept ==
The comic strip centers around an uncool young teacher who tries to be accepted by his pupils, but always fails. Meecher's catchphrase is 'You can call me Trevor', but one of the running jokes is no-one ever does. He's always referred to as 'Sir' or 'Meech' by his class "mates", and 'Trevelyan' by his mother. The strip ended its first series in Issue 3525 when Meecher was abducted by aliens.

== Popularity ==
Mr Meecher featured in a readers' poll in February 2011 allowing the readers to decide which characters would get the axe and which would continue. Overall Mr Meecher came fourth getting beaten only by Harry Hill, Desperate Dan and Pre-Skool Prime Minister.

== Continuation ==
His second run began in July 2011 and ended in July 2012 with 46 strips.

A third series began in issue 3598 (15 September 2012) as a three-panel strip. It survived in this format until the final issue (3610).
