= Reg Carter =

British cartoonist

- Born: Reginald Arthur Lay Carter; 6 December 1886 Southwold, Suffolk, England, United Kingdom of Great Britain and Ireland
- Died: 24 April 1949 (aged 62) Cuckfield, Sussex, England, United Kingdom
- Notable works: Big Eggo (character)

Reginald Arthur Lay Carter (6 December 1886, Southwold, Blything, East Suffolk – 24 April 1949 in Cuckfield, Sussex) was a British cartoonist.

Carter created the cartoon ostrich Big Eggo that appeared on the front cover of the first Beano. On 30 July 1938, the cover strip featuring Big Eggo was drawn by Carter. Carter worked for the Beano drawing Big Eggo and other strips until his death in 1949. Also famous for two sets of humorous postcards entitled Sorrows of Southwold. These affectionately caricatured the three foot gauge Southwold Railway, which was noted for its idiosyncratic locomotives, carriages and leisurely mode of operation.
