= Zoom Rockman =

British cartoonist

- Born: 2000 (age 25–26)
- Notable works: Skanky Pigeon (character)

Zoom Rockman (born 2000), is a British cartoonist from England, whose comic strip Skanky Pigeon first appeared in The Beano when he was 12 years old. He is the youngest artist in the comic's history. Rockman was a cartoonist with the satirical and current affairs magazine Private Eye from 2017 until his resignation in 2023.

== Early life and education ==
Rockman, who comes from an artistic family, was educated at the Jewish Community Secondary School (JCoSS) in New Barnet, London. He studied graphic design at Central Saint Martins, London.

== Awards ==
Rockman was presented with the Achievement in Media award at the 2012 Spirit of London Awards.

In 2013, he was named to the Evening Standard's "hottest 25 under-25s in the capital" list.

In 2023, Rockman won, for the Best Pocket Cartoon, the Mel Calman Award at the Ellwood Atfield cartoonists of the year ceremony.
