= Biffo the Bear =

Character in the British comic The Beano

- Character from The Beano

Publication information
- Star of: Biffo the Bear
- First appearance: Issue 327; (24 January 1948)
- Last appearance: Issue 3695; (27 July 2013)
- Appearance timeline: Issues 327 – 2954, ??
- Creator(s): Dudley D. Watkins
- Author(s): Uncredited: Sid Burgon; Trevor Metcalfe; Jimmy Glen; Nick Park; Turnbull
- Illustrator(s): Dudley D. Watkins; Paul Palmer

In-universe information
- Family: Cuddly (nephew); Dudley (nephew)
- Friends: Buster, Brian, Mary

Also appeared in
- Beano works: The Beano Summer Special 1971, 1974, 1976, 1977, 1991
- DC Thomson works: A series about retired characters from The Beano, along with Pansy Potter, Desert Island Dick, Keyhole Kate; Twinkle books: "Biffo the Bear" and "Biffo the Carpenter"

Biffo the Bear is a fictional character from the British comic magazine The Beano who stars in the comic strip of the same name, created in 1948 by Dudley D. Watkins. He was the mascot of The Beano for several decades.

== Background ==
Biffo's creator, Dudley D. Watkins, originally worked for Beano's friendly rival The Dandy, as well as other DC Thomson children's comics, such as Adventure in the 1920s and The Sunday Post's Oor Wullie comic, noted by Beano creator R. D. Low for his talent of social realist humour. Watkins also participated in comic strips for The Beano as well, drawing for Lord Snooty, The White Mouse Will Get You (If You Don't Watch Out), and the title panels for The King's Got a Tail!.

At the time of the development of Biffo the Bear, rumours circulated that Beano readers were losing interest in the comic strip Big Eggo (the star of the front cover and had been there since the first issue in 1938) because he was not relatable to them anymore in the same way a mammal would. Biffo the Bear debuted as cover star on the 327th issue and remained so until issue 1677. R. D. Low preferred cover star characters to be monochrome because they would stand out in a colourful world, since the front covers of his comics were in colour. This was the same technique he used for Korky the Cat, the first cover star of The Dandy, and Big Eggo; Biffo the Bear followed suit.

== Common strips ==
Many of Biffo's stories were based on his anthropomorphism, such as owning a cafe, working as a ticket seller for camel and elephant rides at the zoo, or busking.

Biffo and his friend Buster

In 1969, Lord Snooty found Biffo's family tree at the Beanotown museum and Biffo uses it to tell stories of his family history to the readers and flashbacks would show how his ancestors interacted with famous historical events. This was written by Watkins with the help of Ian Gray.

=== Buster ===
In issue 575, his (then-unseen) human friend Buster appeared in his stories and had a one-off tale with Biffo in Biffo and Buster. (Note: This was reprinted in August 1988 in The Dandy and The Beano: More From the First Fifty Years, the second of the Golden Years (later 60 Years) series. It was full page and dated 1957, most likely from the 1957 The Beano Book, not a comic issue.)

== Declining appearances ==
When Watkins died in August 1969, David Sutherland continued the series until the 1970s, and then Jimmy Glen took over. Biffo remained as cover star until issue 1677, dethroned by Dennis the Menace, but appeared inside The Beano until issue 2310, however, he would have three one-off strips in the "Readers' Request" feature.

=== Appearances outside The Beano ===
Originally one of R. D. Low's "new big five" comics, but ultimately failed due to paper rationing, The Magic Comic from 1939 was revived in late-January 1976 and ended in 1979. Spin-off stories of Biffo the Bear were printed, aimed at a younger audience than The Beano, and were about Biffo visiting his nephews Cuddly and Dudley. These were written and designed by Turnbull.

Biffo was also the star of pocket-sized Twinkle books in the 1980s, drawn by Bill Ritchie.

=== Revival ===
The series (retitled "Biffo") returned in issue 2445, drawn by Sid Burgon, and finished in issue 2954. The format had been revamped to three or four frames over a page with no speech, often depicting Biffo in fantastical, surreal situations. Some stories were reprinted in 2007 in the Fun Size Comics section.

Trevor Metcalfe contributed a few stories as well, including in The Beano Book 1994. In The Beano Book 1999, Milly O'Naire from Jackpot made a guest appearance with her father, most likely a nod to Burgon's previous work on her comic strip.

== Cameos ==
Biffo was seen in a four-part special leading a group of retired characters, Pansy Potter, Keyhole Kate and Desert Island Dick, to return The Beano to an earlier form (specifically, the 1960s, the logo from that era was used in the story).

Biffo returned in The Beano 2007 Christmas special; he featured in 'The Riot Squad'. His next guest appearance was in the 70 Years Anniversary Beano, drawn by David Sutherland. As the issue was edited by Nick Park (creator of Wallace and Gromit), animals in the zoo could be seen that bore a close resemblance to that of his 1989 short film Creature Comforts. Biffo also made an appearance in the 2010 Beano Annual, also drawn by Sutherland.

In 2013 Biffo appeared in the Funsize Funnies pages of The Beano. Initially drawn by Wayne Thompson, he returned the following year, this time drawn by Paul Palmer. It continued through to the 80th anniversary in 2018 along with Big Eggo. Biffo also appeared in the 2019 Beano Annual in the inner cover artwork with 254 other characters from The Beano's history and was in the time-travelling comic feature "Doctor Whoops!"
