= Jewish Community Secondary School =

The Jewish Community Secondary School
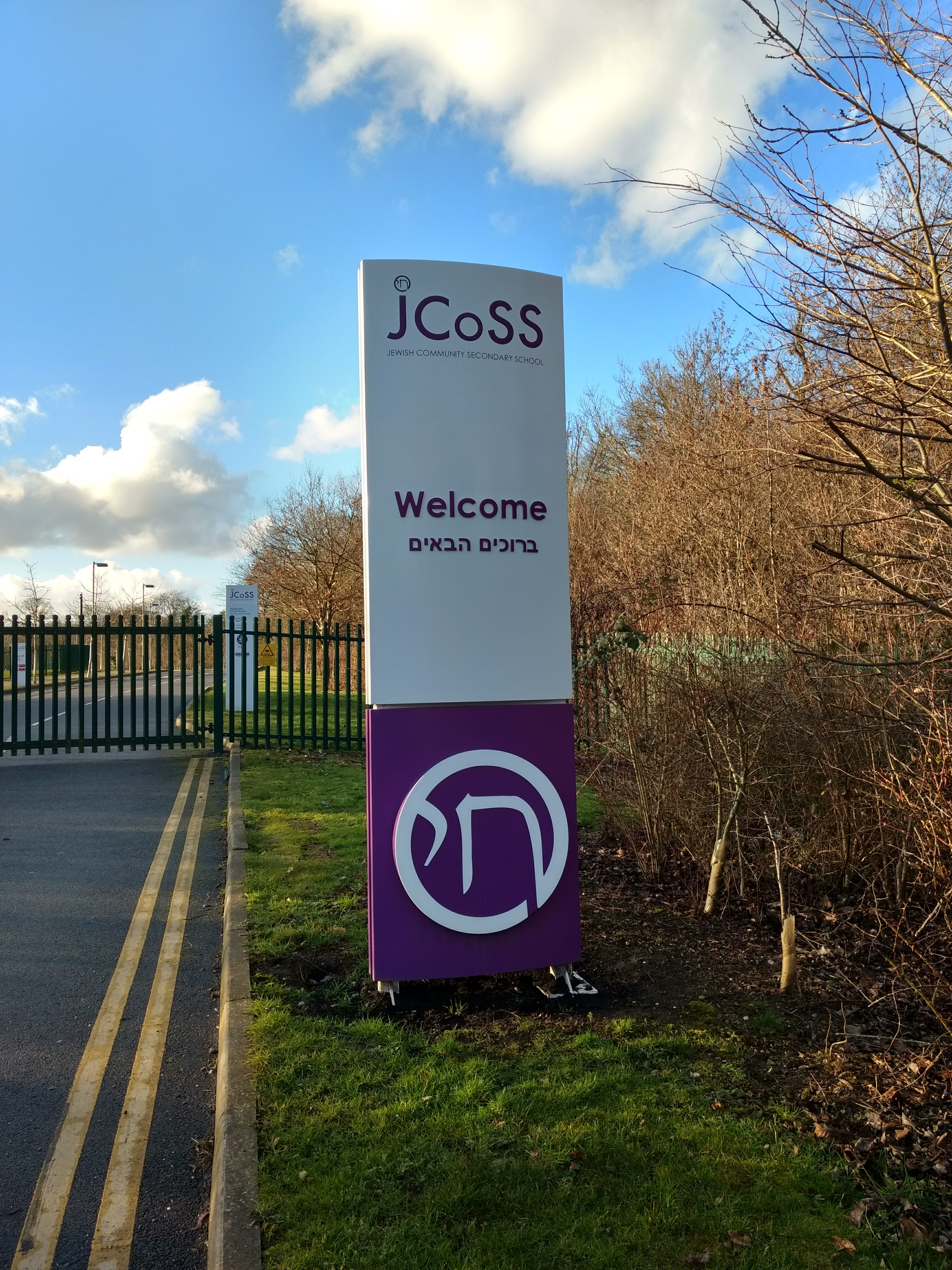

Location
- Castlewood Road; East Barnet, London, EN4 9GE; England; 51.6563°N 0.1718°W

Information
- Type: Voluntary aided school
- Motto: אלו ואלו דברי אלהים חיים (Hebrew) (Talmud, b. Eruvin 13b, 10) (These and these are the words of the Living God)
- Religious affiliation: Judaism
- Established: 6 September 2010
- Local authority: Barnet
- Department for Education URN: 135747 Tables
- Ofsted: Reports
- President: Gerald Ronson
- Chair: Mark Freedman
- Head teacher: Dr. Melanie Lee
- Gender: Mixed
- Age: 11 to 18
- Enrolment: 1360
- Website: www.jcoss.org

The Jewish Community Secondary School (JCoSS) is a state-funded Jewish secondary school in New Barnet, London. Established in 2010, it is the first cross-denominational secondary school in the UK. It was established after Helena Miller (of Leo Baeck College) observed that while her son had gone to JFS, many of his friends had not been able to attend because of oversubscription and halachic requirements. In 2001, she initiated a process of community engagement and consultation which led ultimately to the successful proposal for a new faith school. Construction of the school began in April 2009.

JCoSS opened a year at a time, with up to 180 students joining Year 7 each year until the school was fully populated with around 1360 students. Its sixth form opened in 2012. The school, whose current headteacher is Dr. Melanie Lee, has specialist status in science. It cost £50 million to build, £36 million of which was funded by the government, and is the most expensive state-funded secondary school to be built in the UK. Gerald Ronson, a business tycoon and philanthropist, helped in the fundraising drive and is the president of the JCoSS Trust. The Pears Special Resource Provision (PSRP) at the school has places for up to 49 children (seven places each year) with autistic spectrum disorders. Norwood, a Jewish charity, is providing some of the services at the PSRP.

Before the school opened, several Orthodox rabbis expressed concern over JCoSS's compatibility with their faith. At the construction ceremony, Ed Balls, who at the time was Secretary of State for Children, Schools and Families, said the school would play an important role in dealing with discrimination and prejudice.

In 2019, JCoSS was named The Sunday Times' London State Secondary School of the Year, in recognition of its record-breaking results in GCSE and A Levels.

== Notable former pupils ==
- Zoom Rockman, cartoonist
