= Wilbur Dawbarn =

British cartoonist

Wilbur Dawbarn is a British cartoonist based in High Wycombe, Buckinghamshire. He has drawn cartoons for publications such as Punch, The Times, Private Eye, The Spectator, and comic strips, such as The Beano's Billy Whizz (2012–2014), Mr. Meecher, the Uncool Teacher, Rocky's Horror Show, Winker Watson, Robin Hood's Schooldays, The Badd Lads, and Jack Silver for the Dandy (2010–2014). He also collaborated on Useleus with Alexander Matthews for the children's comic The Phoenix.

In July 2013, Dawbarn tweeted The Dandy digital project had ended, causing speculation the comic was being discontinued. The comic's publisher DC Thomson said this was not the case.
