= Cracker (comics) =

British comic book magazine

Publication information
- Publisher: D. C. Thomson & Co. Ltd
- Publication date: 18 January 1975 to 11 September 1976
- No. of issues: 87

Cracker was a British comic book magazine printed by D. C. Thomson & Co. Ltd that ran from the issues dated 18 January 1975 to 11 September 1976 (a total of 87 issues), when it merged with The Beezer. Some material from Cracker was reprinted in Classics from the Comics.

== List of Cracker comic strips ==
These are in alphabetical order and all numbers refer to issues of Cracker.

Strip Title	Artist	First Appearance	Last Appearance	Notes
The Astro-nuts	Alan Rogers	36	78	
Big-Head Branny - The Strong-Arm Janny	Barrie Appleby	1	24	About a surly and vindictive janitor
Billy The Kid	Gordon Bell	1	87	A strip borrowing heavily from "Dennis the Menace and Gnasher", featuring a tearaway with black bushy hair and a mischievous spotted dog called Pongo. Appeared in The Beezer after the merger.
Castaways on Planet Doom	Terry Patrick	1	35	An adventure story
Curly's Commandos	Barrie Appleby	1	47	About a small gang of children organised along army lines.
Dunder Ed, The Wonder Blunder Boy	Phil Milar	1	87	Not in 18, 38, 39, 40, 43 to 48, 55, 56, 64, 69, 70, 73 and 82.
Fiends Beans	Gordon Bell	25	87	
Ghastly Geezer's Gallery	Ken Harrison and readers of Cracker.	1	87	Not in 7, 17, 33, and 42. A readers feature where readers sent in pictures of monsters referred to as Ghastly Geezers.
The Head-Hunters of Skookum Skool	Ken Harrison	1	55	Had previously appeared in Buzz under the name "Skookum Skool". Not in 33 & 49.
Hector the Collector	John Aldrich	1	55	Not in 49.
Iron Hand	Paddy Brennan	1	87	An adventure story about a secret agent with a metal hand, it later moved to The Beezer after the merger.
Jimmy Jest, His Shadow's a Pest	Ken Harrison	38	87	About a boy whose shadow would get him into trouble.
Joe Soap	John Dallas	1	87	A strip involving a boy and magical soap bubbles. Appeared in The Beezer after the merger.
Little 'Orror	David Easington	16	87	Appeared in The Beezer after the merger.
Mad Ads	Ken Harrison	1	36	They had a Mad Ads competition on the back page. Readers would send in an ad for a mad contraption and if it was printed, they would get 1 pound. A similar thing appeared in The Dandy in the 2010s.
The Nutters	John Geering	1	87	Not in 49. Squabbles between a signalman called Percy Potters plus a family of three squirrels (called Pa, Ma and Junior).
PC McGraw	Ken Harrison	70	87	About a policeman who turns into a monkey/gorilla when wet.
Rip Van Tinkle	Barrie Appleby	41	87	
Sammy	Ken Harrison	1	87	The 'Face' of Cracker, he appeared in a number of features (not comic strips) which were "Jest a minute", "Sammy's Special Report" and "Sammy's Wacky Weekly". "Jest a minute" continued after the merger with The Beezer.
ScrapJack the wacky wizard	Unknown	79	87	
Scrapper	Tom Lavery	1	85	About a kid who liked to get into fights. Appeared in The Beezer after the merger.
Simple Spyman	Bill Ritchie	1	87	A spy with a very long beard, dark glasses, and dark-brimmed hat
Slojak	Barry Appleby	25	87	Involves a young bald boy detective.
The Snookums	Ken Harrison	1	24	A misbehaved class whose strip consisted of large 'action' panels containing with numerous gags.
Spookie Cookie	Tom Williams	1	24	A ghost cook in a haunted manor
Spookum Skool	Ken Harrison	1	23	Yet another strip derivative of "The Bash Street Kids", but set in a haunted castle where the children are ghosts.
Wonder Wellies	Andrew Christine	25	87	Not in 36, 53, 59, 68, and 77. A similarly named and themed strip appeared in Buster.
Young Foo - The Kung Fu Kid	Brian Platt	1	87	A Chinese schoolboy martial artist, complete with bare feet as part of his school uniform. Each week he would feud with Bully Basher. Appeared in The Beezer after the merger.

== See also ==
- List of DC Thomson Publications
