= David Mostyn (cartoonist) =

British cartoonist

David Mostyn (6 August 1944 – 11 November 2025) was a British cartoonist and commercial illustrator who drew for D.C. Thomson from the early 1980s until the 2010s.

== Career ==
Mostyn worked out of Oxford, England.

== Appearances ==
He appeared at the Edinburgh Festival along with a poet named Roger McGough. He also appeared on BBC TV and BBC Radio. Mostyn also got together with famous author Philip Pullman, Richard Hammond, comedian David Williams, and writer Gyles Brandreth.

== Works ==
He was the creator of several comic strips:

- Bertie Buncle (The Dandy, 1978–1982)
- Extra Terrestrial Teacher (School Fun, 1983–1984)
- Strange Hill (Dandy, 1986–2004)
- Danny's Nanny (The Beano 1988–1994)
- Meet Edd: He's a Ghost (The Beezer and The Topper, 1991–1993)
- Molly (Dandy, 1991–2004)
- Cowerin' Wolf (Dandy, 1995-?)
- Hector Spectre (Dandy, 1996-?)
- Medieval Knievel (Dandy, 2003?)
- Eddie The Ghost (Dandy, 2004)
- Hugh Dunnit (Beano, 2005)
- Dr. Doctor (Dandy, 2010)
- Disaster Chef (Dandy, 2011)

Mostyn also worked for various jokebooks.

Mostyn's portfolio included work for:

- Penguin Books
- Random House
- The Pearson Group
- Oxford University Press
- DC Thomson
- Marvel Comics
- DC Comics New York
- Constable Robinson
- Arcturus Publishing
- Andre Deutsch
- Disney (Books)
- Walker Books
- BBC Publications
- Lintas
