= The Badd Lads =

The Badd Lads was a comic strip that ran in The Beezer for twenty years starring Fingers, Knuck and Boss who were inept criminals. They were always getting caught, escaping jail and then finding themselves incarcerated again. Fingers was your quintessential spiv with the pencil thin moustache, Knuck was the thick set, soft goon and Boss was the short but smart brains of the outfit.

The Badd Ladds was illustrated by Malcolm Judge from January 1960 through to 1987. Later artists who worked on the strip were John Dallas, Mervyn Johnston and John Geering. They are rebooted in the 2013 Dandy Annual, by Wilbur Dawbarn in the classic Malcolm Judge style.

The comic strip seems to have been based on the very low budget TV series "Bonehead" running from 1957 to 1962. See imdb for more details.
