= Jonah (comics) =

British comic strip character

- Character from The Beano

Publication information
- Star of: Jonah
- First appearance: Issue 817; (15 March 1958)
- Last appearance: Issue 3751; (13 September 2014)
- Appearance timeline: Issues 817 – 1090, 2331, 2391 (reprint), 2420, 3093, 3751
- Author(s): Uncredited; Walter Fearn (1958–1963)
- Illustrator(s): Ken Reid (1958–1963)

In-universe information
- Family: Percival Plugsley (nephew); Jinx (sister)

Also appeared in
- Beano works: The Beano Annual 1960-1964, 2019; The Beano Summer Special 1988; Beano Comic Library (17 issues)
- DC Thomson works: The Dandy (issues 2385, 2386, 2389, 2405, 2407; from 1993 - ??)

Jonah is a comic strip character in the comic strip published in The Beano. He first appeared in 1958, illustrated by Ken Reid. Although his comic strip appeared sporadically in The Beano, it has also been published in other DC Thomson comic magazines.

== Synopsis ==
Jonah is a skinny, gormless, chinless wonder of a sailor, feared by other mariners because of his clumsiness. He has (accidentally) sunk every ship he has sailed on (as well as all other vessels surrounding, at times), and started a war between the nations of Gorgonzolia and Parafinalia, resulting in the utter destruction of the combined fleets of both countries (a possible reference to the Cold War).

Although unconfirmed, he has similarities to the long-established sailor's superstition, which is based on the Biblical prophet Jonah, whose ship nearly sank in a storm).

== Publication history ==
Jonah's series first published in issue 817, authored by an uncredited Walter Fearn and illustrated by Ken Reid. Reid's passion for the artwork over-stretched Fearn's scripts by several panels (sometimes more than 30) but are seemingly trimmed down to print on the back cover of The Beano. The strip finished after issue 1090.

Jerry Swaffield would later illustrate a one-off Jonah strip in 1988.

== Subsequent appearances ==
=== The Beano ===
There have been two spin-offs. In the year Jonah ended, a new comic strip began entitled Jinx, also drawn by Ken Reid. This strip was similar to Jonah, but starred Jonah's lisping, equally clumsy sister at school; Jinx ended in 1964. Another, entitled Son of Jonah, drawn by Jerry Swaffield, appeared in The Beano from 2606 to 2957. The Jinx series would feature in The Beano Book 1965, and a reprint appeared in issue 4 of The Best of Topper.

Jonah appeared in a background cameo with Big Eggo and Jack Flash in the comic strip Lord Snooty's Day Out in issue 3093, revealing formerly popular characters known by previous generations of readers now live in the Beano retirement home.

The series had a one-off appearance in issue 2331, as part of the Reader's Request series. In 2014, Jonah had a supporting role in The Bash Street Kids, revealing he is Plug's uncle.

Throughout the rest of Beano's media, Jonah's stories have featured in Beano annuals between 1960 and 1964's editions, and a cameo in 2019's, as well as in The Beano Summer Special 1988.

=== DC Thomson ===
Jonah appeared frequently outside of The Beano franchise in a variety of DC Thomson's magazines. In 1971, reprints of his Beano strips published in Hornet from issue 395, and then in the entirety of Buddy's run. New stories also appeared in The Dandy as part of "The Dandy-Beano Collection", in which a few Beano characters featured in The Dandy during 1986 and 1988, followed by new stories in The Dandy from 1993 where he meets Captain Timmy "Thick" Fogg and can shapeshift into a monster humanoid with the help of a water gypsy's magic earring. Jonah was the star of 17 Beano Comic Library books, notably meeting Puss 'n' Boots from The Topper.
