= Nero and Zero =

British comic strip

Nero and Zero was a comic strip originally in the boys' story paper The Wizard, published by DC Thomson. This strip started on 1 November 1930 and was originally drawn by Allan Morley. The strip featured the subtitle the "Rollicking Romans" and featured two bumbling Roman guards called Nero and Zero who guarded Caesar. The strip lasted in the Wizard for ten years. The strip also appeared in The Beezer's first issue.

The strip was later resurrected for the Buzz comic and the pair featured in the first issue. This strip was drawn by Tom Bannister and lasted until issue 40.

It also appeared in The Sunday Post for several years.
