= Baby Crockett =

British comic strip

Baby Crockett was one of the longest running comic strips that ran from The Beezer issue 34 (September 1956) to Beezer 1809 (September 1990). He continued in the merged Beezer and Topper until its demise in 1993, and would appear in all the Beezer annuals and summer specials until they ended in 2002. He also appeared in several of the Dandy Comic Libraries over the years.

In appearance he was a toddler aged around three wearing red shorts & pumps & spoke in a childlike manner with phases such as "Me Thinks" and "Me don't like baffs", occasionally he was troubled by a bully called "Masher Molloy", with Baby normally coming out on top.

Baby Crockett also appeared in young children's comic Bimbo from 1961 to 1972 and its successor Little Star 1972–1976. In both cases the strip was drawn by Bill Ritchie. Baby Crockett himself was a character derived from the earlier Wee Fella, a strip drawn by Davy Law for Thomson's magazine-newspaper The People's Journal from 20 April 1946 to 6 February 1954. It was sometimes drawn by Bob Dewar as well.
