= The Magic Comic =

British comic book

The third issue of the original run, dated 5 August 1939

A typical mid-run example of the relaunched 1970s incarnation, dated 4 March 1978

The Magic Comic was a British comics magazine. It was the ill-fated third comics magazine from DC Thomson (after The Beano and The Dandy). It was aimed at a younger audience, with more emphasis on picture stories. The first issue was published on 22 July 1939. The comic ran for only 80 issues until 25 January 1941. Paper rationing resulting from the outbreak of the Second World War caused its demise. Its Editor Bill Powrie promised that 'the Magic' would return; however, he was killed in action in 1942.

Two annuals, named The Magic Fun Book, were also published in 1941 and 1942. From 1943 to 1949, The Magic Comic would share its annual with The Beano, under the title, The Magic-Beano Book. The cover star was Koko the Pup who would later team up with Big Eggo in the Magic-Beano Books between 1943 and 1950 in the story named Eggo and Koko.

A first issue of The Magic Comic was sold on eBay in February 2006 for £1,250 to a collector, and it was one of only six copies known to exist. A "very fine" quality copy was also sold in 1997 for £2,975. On 20 January 2015 the first 24 issues of The Magic Comic were sold for £13,000 (+20% commission; 15,600); it came to £650 per comic.

On 31 January 1976 DC Thomson revived 'The Magic Comic. This incarnation would go on to last until 1979. The new version was aimed at younger audience than The Beano and Dandy and was more of a pre-school comic than the original Magic comic. The comic was loosely concerned with magic of all kinds. Even though this new comic was considered a revival it contained none of the characters that appeared in the earlier Magic. However it did contain characters from The Beano with a spinoff of Biffo the Bear involving his niece and nephew, Cuddly and Dudley, appearing in the new comic.

== Comic strips featured in the first comic ==
- Koko the Pup (The comic's cover star featuring an anthropomorphic dog.)
- Dolly Dimple, not so simple
- Peter Piper (Drawn by Dudley Watkins this comic strip featured a boy with magical pipes that could bring statues to life. It was revived in the Dandy in the 1990s.)
- Boy Biffo the Brave
- Uncle Dan The Magic man
- The Boy with the Golden Goose
- Cheeky Mary – The Lord Mayors Daughter
- Tell-Tale Tilly
- Sam Swell
- Little Squirty
- The Adventures of Grandfather Clock
- The Tickler Twins in Wonderland (About a pair of twins living in a world full of characters from popular fairy tales and nursery rhymes. The Beano character Pansy Potter would later have her own in Wonderland series.)
- Pa, Ma and Squeaker
- Oompah Pete
- Ugly Muggins
- Wee Hi Lo
- Poor Blind Billy
- The Seven-Foot Cowboy
- Val in the Magic Forest
- The Magic Joke Page
- Inky, Binky and Bluff
- Sooty Snowball (The main character of this comic strip was a black caricature who was dressed in nothing but a grass skirt. It appeared on the comic's back cover.)
- Leave It to Lop Ears
- Crusty Crosspatch
- The Wolf Boy of Badenoch
- Old Pop Pelican
- Tootsy McTurk (A comic strip about a man with unusually large feet. A similar strip called Claude Hopper would later appear in the Dandy.)
- Sammy's Magic Stone
- Herr Paul Fry – The Nasty Spy
- Ding-Dong Dally
- Little Orphan Andy
- Old Father Time
- Kipper Feet
- Beric the Caveboy
- Dizzy Duck
- Dick Turpentine the hopeless highway man
- Dirty Dick – The Chimney Sweep
- Stone-Age Steve
- Young Buffalo Bill
- Two Wanderers of the War
- Softie Sam
- Gulliver
- Keeper of the Flock
- Hiram Scaram – The Stagecoach Driver
- Robin Hood
- Pete of the Spitfires
- Bandy Legs

== Comic strips featured in the revived comic ==
- Witch Wanda
- Elfey
- Rainbow Road (about children in neighbouring houses with each door painted a different colour of the rainbow)
- Copy Cat
- Betsy's Magic Bracelet (a serial about a girl who owned a bracelet with lucky charms enchanted by a friendly witch)
- Flying Flapears (a flying rabbit)
- Spaceship Lollipop
- Aladdin and his Magic Lamp
- The Magic Club (including "Magic Pictures", "Magic Mirror" and "Magic Riddles")
- Cuddly and Dudley (Spin-off from The Beano's Biffo the Bear)
- Peter Popin and his Magic Popup Book (a boy who could "fly through time and space" into the worlds within his popup book)
- Tommy Trix
- A Talk with Stubby Pencil
- Magic Playtime
- Penny and the Prince
- The Magic of... (on the back cover, a factual article about the wonders of the world).
