= Keyhole Kate =

British comic strip

Keyhole Kate was a 1930s British comic strip series in The Dandy. The strip featured a nosy young girl who liked to look through people's keyholes. She appeared in The Dandy's first issue, drawn by Allan Morley in 1937. She continued in The Dandy until 1955 and appeared as the cover strip of issue 295. She later appeared in the new Sparky comic released in 1965, alongside Hungry Horace another character who appeared in The Dandy's first issue and was drawn by Morley. The character was featured alongside Hungry Horace on the front cover of the Sparky book from 1970 to 1972.

The character continued in Sparky until 1974 when the character was dropped and she then reappeared in The Dandy in the late 1980s and early 1990s drawn by Sid Burgon before being dropped and later revived again. The revived strip was later drawn by Tom Paterson, Trevor Metcalfe, Judi Mitchell who became the first female artist to draw for The Dandy or in fact for any comic by publisher DC Thomson and Anthony Caluori, until it was finally dropped in 2007. However the character's legacy remains as the character has appeared on the front cover of The Beano and Dandy books and has appeared in the longer The Bash Street Kids stories by Kev F. Sutherland. She reappeared in the 2013 Dandy Annual drawn by Laura Howell.

Keyhole Kate then moved to The Dandy's online version. In this version, the character is a Nancy Drew-esque reporter for the school newspaper.

She appears in Dandy annuals, drawn by Lew Stringer since 2013, starting with Dandy Annual 2014; Stringer also scripts the strip.
