= Ken H. Harrison =

British comic artist

Ken H. Harrison (born c. 1940) is a British comic artist best known for his work for DC Thomson. His credits include Robbie Rebel, Big Brad Wolf and Lord Snooty for The Beano, The Hoot Squad for Hoot (later reprinted as The Beano's The Riot Squad), The Broons and Oor Wullie for The Sunday Post, Skookum Skool, Spookum Skool and The Snookums for Buzz and Cracker comics.

He drew Oor Wullie and The Broons for The Sunday Post for many years, Desperate Dan for The Dandy between 1983 and 2007 until The Dandy was revamped. He drew the front cover illustration for Classics from the Comics. Until 2012 he drew Minnie the Minx from The Beano, in a style reminiscent of original artist Leo Baxendale.
