= Bill Ritchie =

Scottish cartoonist (1931–2010)

- Born: William Ritchie; 1 August 1931 Glasgow
- Died: 25 January 2010 (aged 78)
- Areas: Cartoonist, Penciller

Bill Ritchie (1 August 1931 – 25 January 2010) was a Scottish cartoonist. He is known for work on comics published by D. C. Thomson.

== Biography ==
Born in Glasgow, Ritchie attended the Glasgow School of Art, where he learnt little about cartoons or comics; instead, he taught himself by practising from local comics artists Jack Lindsay, Bud Neill, Jimmy Malcolm, Harry Smith and Bill Tait. It was Malcolm who suggested he try to draw comics for D. C. Thomson in Dundee. While serving in the army in Korea, he submitted his first cartoons to the publisher, which were printed in The Weekly News.

His first comic strip was Clumsy Claude in The Beano, and for many years he drew Baby Crockett in the Beezer. Between 1957 and 1964 Ritchie drew the illustrations for "The Glad Mag" an annual magazine produced by students of Queen's College, Dundee as part of their charities campaign. Copies of these magazines are held by University of Dundee Archive Services.

After his retirement in the 1990s, his comics were "ghosted" by other artists.

He died on 25 January 2010.

== Bibliography ==
Comics work includes:

- Baby Crockett in the Beezer
- Barney Bulldog in Sparky – the third cover strip, similar to Biffo the Bear
- Clumsy Claude in The Beano
- Dicky Burd in the Beezer
- Hungry Hoss in Beezer – an ever-hungry horse, owned by Joe the cowboy robber
- Smiffy in the Beezer
- Supporting Life in Plug
- Sweet Sue in The Beano – running from 1978 to 1980, the strip featured Sue, a sweet and inoffensive young girl who always got the better of school bullies Harriet and Mabel. She had a dog called William.
- The Moonsters in Sparky
- Toots in Bunty
