= Allan Morley =

British comic artist

Allan Morley (Scarborough, North Riding of Yorkshire, England, 29 April 1895 - Thanet, Kent 5 September 1960) was a British comic artist. He first worked for DC Thomson in 1925, drawing a number of comic strips for the Sunday Post and for DC Thomson's story papers including The Wizard, where he drew Nero and Zero. He also drew a number of strips for both The Beano and The Dandy from the late thirties until the early fifties. He drew Keyhole Kate, Hungry Horace and Freddie the Fearless Fly, three long-running strips which first appeared in the first issue of The Dandy. He also drew a number of strips for The Beano, including Big Fat Joe, which appeared in the comic's first issue. The last time he drew for The Beano was the last strip of The Magic Lollipops in issue 475 (25 August 1951). Allan Morley died in Kent on 5 September 1960.

== Legacy ==
Allan Morley was held in such high regard by DC Thomson that they said the magazines might close without him. Along with Dudley D. Watkins, Allan Morley was one of the first artists allowed to sign his work, which he did from January 1947. His strips even survived after his death with reprints of Waggy the Shaggy Doggy continuing in the Dandy until the 1970s.

== Bibliography ==
=== The Skipper ===
- Wishbone Wuzzy-The Merry Magician

=== The Wizard ===
- Nero and Zero

=== The Rover ===
- Nosey Parker

=== The Dandy ===
- Keyhole Kate
- Hungry Horace
- Freddie the Fearless Fly

=== The Beano ===
- Big Fat Joe
- Cocky Dick He's Smart and Slick
- The Magic Lollipops
- Tricky Dicky Ant
- Sammy Shrinko
- Sammy's Super Rubber
- Smarty Smokum and his pipe of peace
