= Freddy the Fearless Fly =

British comic strip

Freddy the Fearless Fly is a British comic strip series in The Dandy about a fly who is not scared of people. The strip began in the first issue in 1937, drawn by Allan Morley. In the 1990s, the strip returned, albeit more humorously, with stories such as Freddy rasping at a vampire in front of a TV, these were drawn by Gordon Bell and Tom Paterson. The strip returned again in 2011, as a quarter-page strip. This strip is out of series at the moment was drawn by Phil Corbett and involved his encounters with cool flies and humans.
