= The Beano =

British weekly children's comic magazine

- The Beano issue 1678, cover dated 14 September 1974, the first appearance of Dennis the Menace and Gnasher on the front cover.
- Chief-Editor: John Anderson
- Former editors: See list
- Staff writers: See list
- Categories: Anthology comic, Children's humour
- Frequency: Weekly
- Circulation: 40,214 (Jan-Dec 2024)
- Founder: R. D. Low
- First issue: 30 July 1938; 88 years ago (4354 issues as of 16 September 2026)
- Company: DC Thomson
- Country: United Kingdom
- Based in: Dundee, Scotland
- Language: English
- Website: beano.com
- OCLC: 28686914

The Beano (also known as Beano and formerly The Beano Comic) is a British anthology comic magazine created by Scottish publishing company DC Thomson. Its first issue was published on 30 July 1938, and it published its 4000th issue in August 2019. Popular and well-known comic strips and characters include Dennis the Menace, Minnie the Minx, The Bash Street Kids, Roger the Dodger, Billy Whizz, Lord Snooty and His Pals, Ivy the Terrible, General Jumbo, Jonah, and Biffo the Bear.

The Beano was planned as a pioneering children's magazine that contained mostly comic strips, in the style of American newspaper gag-a-days, as opposed to the more text-based story papers that were immensely popular before the Second World War. In the present, its legacy is its misbehaving characters, escapist tales and anarchic humour with an audience of all ages. Beano is a multimedia franchise with spin-off books and Christmas annuals, a website, theme park rides, games, cartoon adaptations, and a production company.

The Beano is the best-selling comic magazine outside Japan, having sold over 2 billion copies since its inception. It is also the world's longest-running comic magazine, being published weekly since 1938. For most of its history, DC Thomson published The Beano alongside its sister comic The Dandy until the latter ceased publication in 2012.

It has had three characters as the mascot throughout the years: Big Eggo (1938–1948), Biffo the Bear (1948–1974), and the current, Dennis the Menace and Gnasher (1974–present).

== History ==
=== Creation (1920s–1939) ===
Throughout the 1920s, DC Thomson dominated the British comics industry. Dubbed "the big five", the publisher's most successful comics were Adventure (1921), The Rover and The Wizard (1922), The Skipper (1930) and The Hotspur (1933). (Note: Original contender was 1924's The Vanguard, which discontinued two years later.) These were weekly issued boys' magazines for preteen males, containing anthologies by DC Thomson's creator staff designed in various formats and genres. They became popular throughout the United Kingdom, notably in English industrial cities, helped through the company's ability to view sales and promotions in the areas much more easily than the rival publishers in London. Although many were about "super men" the young readers could idolise, the rest of the stories would be comic strips inspired by the gag-a-day strips in American newspapers full of stylised characters, slapstick and puns.

Overseeing the magazines was the Managing Editor of Children's Publications, R. D. Low, who first joined the company in 1913. Almost a decade into the big five's success, the stories shifted to comedic and included more comic strips, which gave Low an idea of creating a new "big five" which focused on the funnies more than drama. The suggestion was approved; editors Bill Blain and (sub-editor) Albert Barnes of The Wizard and The Hotspur, respectively, joined Low's project. The new team placed a newspaper advertisement into The Daily Telegraph (Note: The Daily Telegraph had a reputation of being the best news source to find the artist jobs in the world.) asking for artists and/or comic ideas. With the help of the advertisement responses and employed artists at DC Thomson, The Dandy was published in 1937, the New Big Five's first member. For The Beano (initially called "The Beano Comic" until issue 412), Low received comic strip suggestions by Reg Carter, an English illustrator in Sussex who had created funnies for several British comics and designed humorous postcards. After an in-person interview, Low and Carter planned the front cover for The Beano's first issue, eventually creating the character Big Eggo (originally named Oswald the Ostrich). It would be in colour whilst the inside of the magazine would be black and white, (Note: Wee Peem also had slight red colouring.) a tactic used for The Dandy's first issue (black and white stories inside, colourful Korky the Cat strip on the front). Joining the Big Eggo strip would be many funnies, such as Hugh McNeill's Ping the Elastic Man, James Jewell's Wee Peem, Allan Morley's Big Fat Joe, Eric Roberts' Rip Van Wink, Dudley D. Watkins' Lord Snooty and His Pals, and Roland Davies' Contrary Mary. Despite the aim to make a new comic series full of American-inspired comic strips, The Beano also contained short stories, serial fiction and adventure stories similar to the Big Five's magazines; Morgyn the Mighty was previously in The Rover. Tin-Can Tommy and Brave Captain Kipper were reprints, co-produced by the Italian art agency Torelli Bros.

Worth 2d with a free prize of a "whoopee mask", issue 1 of The Beano was released on 26 July 1938 for the 30th, selling roughly 443,000 copies. Like The Dandy, its name is from a Low-led DC Thomson office party called The DB Club (The Dandy Beano Club). DC Thomson had several office party clubs that hosted different types of staff gatherings to choose from (e.g. The Prancers would hike hills), but Low's DB Club preferred playing golf and dining throughout Dundee. The two magazines also followed the one-word titles of other comics by rival companies, such as Amalgamated Press' Crackers, Sparkler, Puck and some books from its Union Jack series (The Marvel, The Magnet and The Gem); and Target Publications' Chuckler, Rattler and Dazzler. Beano editor-in-chief was George Moonie, former sub-editor of The Wizard, who would be editor until the summer of 1959. He later explained DC Thomson was a competitive company that wanted to make the best children's literature in the United Kingdom, but there was also competition within itself as Beano offices was determined to beat The Dandy's popularity.

=== World War Two, reaching million sales (1939–1945) ===
Drastic changes occurred behind the scenes of The Beano during the Second World War: George Moonie and editing partner Ron Fraser left to join the Royal Marines and Air Force respectively, both not returning until c. 1946. Stuart Gilchrist became sole editor-in-chief after Moonie's other sub-editor Freddie Simpson became ill and resigned. Contact was also lost with Torelli Bros. so in-house creations of Tin-Can Tommy began from issue 69 by Sam Fair. Paper rationing caused the rest of Low's New Big Five to be cancelled (it stopped at three published, the third member being The Magic Comic (1939), which ended with 80 issues in 1941), and The Beano to fluctuate its page count instead of its usual 28. (Note: 28 pages stopped at issue 62 in October 1939, which was 24 pages long. Then page count dropped to 22 in issue 98, 20 at issue 101, and 18 in issue 120. The lowest page count was issue 326's 10.) Eventually, The Beano became a fortnightly magazine (alternating with The Dandy comic) until 23 July 1949.

Comic strips would encourage readers to help their parents and other adults with the war effort, and to be optimistic about the war's outcome. New comic strips mocked Mussolini and propagandist William Joyce, Lord Snooty and His Pals stories would be about the protagonists outsmarting the Axis leaders, (Note: Moonie, who returned from the war a Captain once in charge of an assault craft at D-Day, would tell David Puttman he believed Lord Snooty did more for the war than him.) and other stories would be about characters recycling paper. Big Eggo front covers were often about Eggo pranking servicemen during the Blitz, and Pansy Potter received a medal for single-handedly capturing a Nazi U-boat. Issue 192 would debut a 16-part prose story about a boy and his mother being evacuated to the United States and becoming the enemy of a Chicago gangster's widow.

Issues published weekly every Tuesday in 1938, (Note: The date of the Saturday of that week is written on the front.) and when the magazine changed distribution to every two weeks, the day remained unchanged. From issue 366, the day changed to Friday until issue 375 which began the Thursday publication day schedule.

=== Post-war changes (1945–1988) ===
December 1945 marked a milestone: issue 272 became the first Beano issue to sell over a million copies. The end of the war also ushered in a new era for the comic, debuting superhero Jack Flash, the debut of Biffo the Bear as new cover star and a new generation of trouble-making kids: Dennis the Menace, Minnie the Minx, The Bash Street Kids, and Roger the Dodger. DC Thomson also introduced new comic magazines like The Beezer and The Topper that a few Beano artists also created characters and stories for.

After the war saw a drift away from text stories and adventure comics, with the last text story published in 1955; adventure comics lasted longer with 1975 being the last year to feature them as General Jumbo's eighth series drew to a close in issue 1734.

George Moonie resigned as editor-in-chief in 1959 to develop comics for girls. Sub-editor of The Beezer Harry Cramond succeeded Moonie until retiring in 1984, described as the most influential editor in The Beano's history. He oversaw new merchandising, high sales, (Note: The Beano eventually passed The Dandy's sales by 100,000 copies. but both magazines sometimes sold up to four million issues per week.) and the thousandth and two thousandth issues. DC Thomson's Beano offices featured on documentary television and Cramond's successor Euan Kerr guest-starred on television for the magazine's 50th anniversary.

=== Move to full colour (1988–present) ===
The Beano began to advertise outside of DC Thomson's products in 1988 in order to keep both it and The Dandy "pocket money" cheap, beginning with issue 2407. Issue 2674 in 1993 was the first issue to feature every page in colour.

A notable revamp was the 50th birthday issue, which had an abnormally larger page count with more coloured sections and printed on wider sheets. A decade later, issues gained eight extra pages with computer-based art. In the 21st century, there were seven changes within a five-year span: logo updates, fonts assigned for certain design roles, (Note: New headline fonts were introduced (CCZoinks), circa 2007; the balloon font was also changed to Cloudsplitter by Blambot.) and the magazine started using glossy paper. The comic reached 3000 issues in January 2000.

From issue 3442 in 2008 (and as of 2026), the day the comic was released was changed to Wednesday.

Outside of the magazine, Beano's brand expanded into a multimedia franchise. Theme park tie-ins, a website, spin-off magazines, and animated television programmes starring the popular comic characters (several for Dennis the Menace) became common, keeping The Beano in popular culture. The turn of the millennium began a sales decline and led to friendly rival The Dandy being discontinued in 2012. Eventually, The Beano recovered after the creation of its magazine subscription service, which also shipped internationally.

In June 2016, DC Thomson launched Beano Studios as a subsidiary company in order to expand the franchise. Following the launch of Beano Studios, the name of the weekly comic itself changed to merely Beano; issue 3854 introduced a new logo that dropped "The" from the title shown on the cover. The Beano and Beano are now used interchangeably by Beano Studios to refer to the comic. As of 2026, two pieces of Beano spin-off media have been produced and released by Beano Studios; an animated television series Dennis & Gnasher: Unleashed!, which aired on CBBC from 2017 to 2021, and a short film loosely based on the character Calamity James that aired on BBC Three in 2023. In 2021, Fox Entertainment reached a deal with Beano Studios to produce a Bananaman show.

In 2018, The Beano officially became the longest-running weekly comic magazine in the world, and marked its 4000th issue the following year.

== Stories ==
Jimmy and his Magic Patch was a popular text comic adventure that would have eight series (three of them reprints) between 1944 and 1959.

Plots and dialogue are written into a script by an (often) uncredited DC Thomson writer, a formerly common practice for DC Thomson magazines. Uncredited artists assigned to a strip(s) will design all its stories into a "series" that the chief editor will arrange into an order to publish for each issue. Strips are sometimes ghostwritten by other artists who imitate the original designer's style, which is helpful if artists retire or die unexpectedly, otherwise the strip is discontinued. "When I started I was drawing two pages a week and thinking 'Phew, that's quite a lot'. Now I do 10 or 12 pages a week. You have to do more all the time to stay where you are," explained Nigel Parkinson. From March 2016, authors and illustrators are now credited in issues.

There have been over a thousand stories throughout the magazine's history told through various ways. Since November 1975, the magazine has contained only comic strips in the style of American newspaper "funnies", but it began with other genres. The last genre to leave Beano was adventure stories: short tales eleven-pictures long in text comics format. The stories were either dramatic or dramedies, but heavily featured hobbies and interests young boys had (war and the military, hunting, sailing, jungle men). They also stood out because the illustrations of backgrounds, animals and human characters were photorealistic. Although artists like Dudley D. Watkins drew for a few series, the most prolific illustrator was Irish artist Paddy Brennan, who notably drew for The Daring Deeds of Sinbad the Sailor, Red Rory of the Eagles and General Jumbo in the 1950s. Comic adventure stories were a hybrid: adventure stories presented as a comic strip.

Prose stories were a page of text with an illustration at the top. Some stories were about animals with artwork by former Big Five illustrator Richard "Toby" Baines, but the longest-running prose character in the magazine's history was Prince Ivor, who first starred in Follow the Secret Hand. The last prose story to appear was Ace From Space in 1955.

Although comic strips have featured in The Beano since issue 1, their contents has changed throughout. Anthropomorphic animals were common stars that would partake in human activities, and the punchlines occurred from the failures to do so. Misbehaving children showed most popular with Lord Snooty and His Pals becoming the first longest-running strip when it concluded in 1991, but the most well known that continue to appear in issues are Dennis the Menace, Minnie the Minx, The Bash Street Kids, and Roger the Dodger. Some adult-starring characters also misbehaved but they were usually portrayed as incompetent, notably Jonah. In the late 20th century, merging comic strip characters in the same vicinity became common in the franchise, such as the video game Beanotown Racing, but characters living together in "Beanotown" became a prominent feature of comic strips into the present. (Note: Notably, Lord Snooty lives in Bunkerton, General Jumbo lives in Dinchester, Billy the Cat lives in Burnham, etc. Lord Snooty's returns in the 21st century retcons Bunkerton as a district in Beanotown.)

Due to the initial target audience of The Beano being schoolboys, masculine interests, hobbies, and values dominated issues constantly. Aside from aforementioned adventure stories and comedic characters, there were cowboys, aliens, kings, the supernatural, fantasy creatures (and talking animals), and men whose lifestyle or jobs require physical strength (despite the story making their careers incidental). The Beano alternated between mocking or idolising these characters through story formats; wealthy characters causing mischief, caring about their families or being shown underprivileged lives made the working-class audience relate and sympathise with them. Female characters were usually supporting a male character, joint protagonist with a male character, or the antagonist. Prose stories starring girls and women were about the protagonist searching out the truth to a secret, usually over a friend's/family disappearance, or they were witches cursing or tormenting the male protagonists. Female comic characters were also in supporting roles with or join-protagonist with a male character, but the starring characters notably had binary stereotypical traits: drawn as tall and flowy, Swanky, Lanky Liz is obsessed with fashion and makeup and acts vain and snobbish, whereas Pansy Potter, Minnie the Minx and Toots from The Bash Street Kids share the round-faced and snub-nosed art style of the boys in their stories and are unruly tomboys (in Pansy Potter's case, showcases the strength she inherited from her father). Non-White characters starred in their stories either set in Africa, Asia, or South America, or were about the character adapting to a new life in the United Kingdom.

Stories used to vary in length and layout, but in 2012, The Beano debuted a chapter called Funsize Funnies where shorter comic strips shared some pages. In some instances, these extremely short strips were brand new (Stunt Gran, BamBeanos, BSK CCTV, Gnash Gnews, Winston), but others were tiny reboots of older comic strips that the new audience could not recall reading before. Quiet reboots included Simply Smiffy (cancelled 1987), Rasher (cancelled 1995), Little Plum (cancelled 2007), Les Pretend (cancelled 2007), Baby Face Finlayson (cancelled 2005), Biffo the Bear (cancelled 1999), Pansy Potter (cancelled 1993), and Lord Snooty (cancelled 1991).

=== Crossovers ===
The 80th-anniversary comic memorably features characters from the first issue and the rest of 1938. Left to right: Wee Peem, Tin-Can Tommy, Pansy Potter, Lord Snooty, and Big Fat Joe.

The Beano allows its characters from different strips to interact with each other. Reprinting old stories or redistributing characters into other magazines is common throughout DC Thomson's history, as if the stories are set in the same universe. The Lord Snooty series discontinued old characters and replaced them with Beano strip characters of the past; Dennis the Menace featured in DC Thomson's Champ magazine in the mid-1980s and The Weekly News tabloid-magazine for four years in the 1950s. Morgyn the Mighty, Tricky Dicky, Bananaman and Corporal Clott were stories previously from The Rover, The Topper, Nutty and The Dandy, respectively, whereas one of Gnasher's puppies had her own strip in The Beezer and Topper and Jackie magazine.

=== Anniversary issues ===
Along with guest editors, anniversary issues are frequently contained with crossovers. The 2000th issue had the "Hall of Fame" strip which showed framed portraits of characters from the past, and issue 3443's Fred's Bed featured Fred crawling under his bed and time travelling through the magazine's comic strips. For the 80th anniversary, issue 3945 was guest edited by actor-turned children's author David Walliams and had a large crossover story about Bash Street School opening the Beanotown's 1938 time capsule and discovering a map, which leads to robots and a giant tentacle monster breaking out to attack the residents. There was also a flashback panel of the time capsule being sealed which featured a handful of comic strip characters from the first issue, later helping the present day characters discover how to defeat the tentacle monster, named Simon. Issue 4000's crossover was a time travel story where the Beanotown characters of the present helped their future selves save the world.

== Creators ==
=== Chief Editor history ===
As of 2020, there have been seven official chief editors:

- George Moonie (1938–1939, c. 1946–1959)
- Harold Cramond (1959–1984)
- Euan Kerr (1984–2006)
- Alan Digby (2006–2011)
- Michael Stirling (2011–2012)
- Craig Graham (2012–2016)
- John Anderson (2016–present) (Note: Anderson, born in England, is the first non-Scottish editor for the magazine.)

Temporary chief editors:

- Stuart Gilchrist (1939–c. 1946) stood in as editor when George Moonie joined the Navy for World War Two.
- Dick and Dom (2006) edited issue 3311 and chose their favourite strips from the available 2005 waiting list.
- Nick Park (2008) edited issue 3443 to celebrate Beano's 70th anniversary.
- Harry Hill (published 6 March 2013) edited the 2013 Red Nose Day special.
- Andy Murray (28 June 2014) edited the Wimbledon special.
- David Walliams (2018) edited issue 3945 to celebrate the 80th anniversary.
- Joe Sugg (2021) edited issue 4077 for Dennis the Menace's 70th anniversary.
- Marcus Rashford (2022) edited issue 4146 following the release of his book, You Can Do It: How to Find Your Voice and Make a Difference.
- Leah Williamson (2023) edited issue 4212 to celebrate Minnie The Mix 70th anniversary.

=== Notable artists ===
- Barrie Appleby
- Nigel Auchterlounie creates The Numskulls's strips, but also has writer credits for other strips.
- Leo Baxendale created The Bash Street Kids and Minnie the Minx
- Gordon Bell
- Basil Blackaller
- Paddy Brennan
- Nick Brennan
- Sid Burgon
- Reg Carter created the first cover star Big Eggo.
- James Crighton also designed the first logo.
- Wilbur Dawbarn
- Hunt Emerson
- Sam Fair created comic strips for the spin-off annuals.
- Andy Fanton
- John Geering
- Barry Glennard
- Charlie Grigg
- Harry Hargreaves
- Ken H. Harrison
- Laura Howell became the first female artist to create strips for the magazine in 2007.
- Diego Jourdan
- Malcolm Judge
- David Law
- Trevor Metcalfe
- Allan Morley
- David Mostyn
- Vic Neill
- Robert Nixon
- Gary Northfield
- David Parkins
- Nigel Parkinson is considered the Beano ambassador, creating up to 20 strips for different stories a week.
- Tom Paterson
- Mike Pearse
- Jim Petrie made 2000 Minnie the Minx stories.
- Dean Rankine
- Ken Reid
- Bill Ritchie
- Zoom Rockman became the youngest artist to have their work in The Beano at 12-years-old. His comic strips appeared exclusively in the 75th anniversary issue.
- Jon Rushby
- Cavan Scott
- Duncan Scott
- Jamie Smart
- Lew Stringer
- David Sutherland
- Kev F. Sutherland
- Dudley D. Watkins was an employee of DC Thomson who had designed stories for a variety of the company's magazines over a decade before The Beano's first issue. He was the original creator of Morgyn the Mighty during its run in The Rover.
- Stevie White

== Merchandise ==
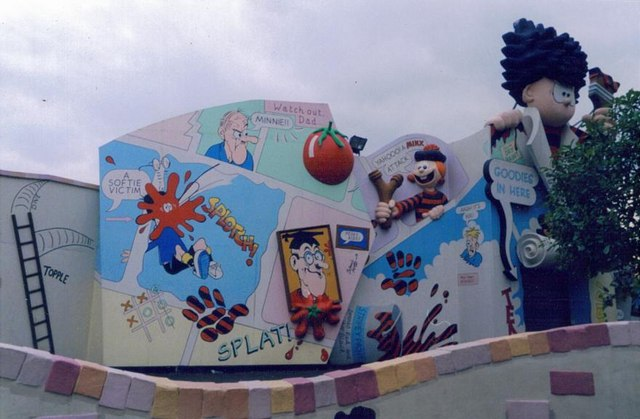
The now-defunct Beanoland at Chessington World of Adventures in the UK.

From the first issue, readers have received free gifts from The Beano: toy masks, sweets, posters, and toys. Originally, free gifts would be attached inside the cover or strategically on the front so that it could distract the buyer from other comics next to The Beano on the shelves, hopefully excited for the next issue after reading it and eating/playing with the toys. Gifts were intentionally sporadic, especially during the Christmas period when families' money would be saved for food and presents. Issue 90 would be the last issue with a gift (licorice "black eye") due to rationing, the next free gift being the Flying Snorter Balloon in issue 953. The most popular free gift was issue 2201's Gnasher Snapper, a prank toy that would make a bang sound when unfolded, and was re-gifted occasionally in later issues, as well as the 60th anniversary.

During the 25th anniversary of Dennis the Menace, The Dennis the Menace Fan Club was formed. The fan club was instantly popular, recalls Euan Kerr in 1984; "The club enrolled over 2000 new members every week, well into the 90s[.]" Membership was 30p, and new members received a membership card full of classified communication tactics and two badges: a red one with Dennis' face on the front and a furry one of a googly-eyed Gnasher face—the latter was the most sought-after badge in the club's history. For two years, there was a tie-in agony aunt page called Dear Dennis (issue 1679–1767) where fan club members sent Dennis their problems that Dennis would reply to in the following issue; thousands of letters would arrive at DC Thomson per week and the authors of the messages would receive prizes. The club would be renamed The Beano Club, which ended in 2010, but had over 1.5 million members. A spin-off was introduced called Gnasher's Fang Club, and Gnasher would ask readers to send him stories about their pets' adventures which could be printed into the next issue. "The mailbag of little drawings of pets was several thousand per week," remembers sub-editor Morris Heggie. "And the popularity lasted and lasted."

The 21st century celebrated anniversaries with more memorabilia. For The Beano's 70th birthday, DC Thomson published The Beano Special Collectors Edition: 70 Years of Fun (2008), and The History of The Beano (2008) was published by Waverly Books, both documenting the magazine's history; two exhibitions at the University of Dundee (Happy Birthday, Beano!) and The Cartoon Museum (Beano and Dandy Birthday Bash!) showed the public private DC Thomson artwork and the history of the magazine. For 2018, readers could buy a box for the 80th anniversary containing posters, reprints of selected older issues, and two books updating the previous documentation of the magazine's history, as well as Minnie the Minx's origins. Both anniversaries had tie-in museum exhibitions that also told their audiences the magazine's history. Limited-edition figurines from Robert Harrop were available to buy from their official website in late 2008.

The 21st century also began Beano's branching into different mediums: their first website, Beanotown.com, formed in 2000, and Chessington World of Adventures opened Beanoland in the same year. Both would later discontinue but Beanotown.com would be revamped as beano.com, a website full of games, Beano secrets and other activities for children. Gulliver's Travels opened the Beano 6 Super Ride in May 2021. The Beano was also the face of the United Kingdom's 2018 Summer Reading Challenge, called Mischief Makers, which included a special Dennis the Menace novel tie-in called Dennis the Menace and the Chamber of Mischief by Beano artist Nigel Auchterlounie. The Dennis the Menace Fan Club was re-launched as a phone app, rebranded as The Dennis and Gnasher Fan Club, and allowed readers free membership, printable badges, and pranks. On television, the Sky Kids show SO Beano! aired; a TV show with special guests, children presenters, and fun and games, in a similar style to Friday Download and Scrambled!

=== Annuals ===
Every year since 1939, the comic has consistently released an annual, known as The Beano Book until 2002 and The Beano Annual from 2003 onwards. In 2018, it was estimated that an original 1939 Beano annual in relatively good condition could be worth up to £1,500.

=== Spin-off comics ===
==== Comic libraries ====
Since 1982 the comic, along with The Dandy, has also run "Comic Library" titles. Released monthly, these titles are a feature-length (usually about 64-page) adventure, featuring a character from the comic itself. They are available in A5 size only. In 1998, these were replaced by the Fun Size Beano. Fun Size Comics were discontinued in late 2010.

==== Beano Specials ====
The comic also ran A4-sized Beano Specials in 1987 with full coloured pages, which later were replaced by Beano Superstars which ran for 121 issues from 1992 to 2002. These were similar to the Comic Library series. Some of the last issues were printed versions of episodes from the 1996–1998 Dennis and Gnasher animated TV series. A Beano Poster Comic series was also printed in the early 1990s.

The Beano Specials returned in 2003, and are now published seasonally. The issues were numbered, and the first one was a Dennis and Friends special, the last a Christmas reprint special. These were replaced by BeanoMAX in early 2007.

==== BeanoMAX ====
BeanoMAX was launched in 2007 as a sister comic to The Beano. It featured many of the same characters and strips, however the stories in BeanoMAX were aimed at a slightly older audience and were generally longer than their Beano counterparts. It ran monthly from 2007 to 2013 before being rebranded as the Dennis the Menace and Gnasher Megazine. It would later be rebranded again as EPIC! in 2016, by which point it had transitioned into an independent magazine aimed at pre-teens, with Beano characters only making occasional appearances. The comic ended in 2019, with a total of 151 issues being released across its three iterations.

==== Plug ====
Plug was a comic based on the eponymous character from The Bash Street Kids that began with issue dated 24 September 1977, and is notable for being the first comic to make use of rotogravure printing. The magazine similar in style to I.P.C's Krazy which had started the previous year. It contained uncharacteristically outlandish material for D C. Thomson, as well as later including celebrity appearances in the comic.

The comic revealed Plug's full name to be Percival Proudfoot Plugsley and also gave him a pet monkey by the name of Chumkee. Plug's strip was mostly drawn by Vic Neill but other artists, including Dave Gudgeon drew some later strips. Other strips included Antchester United, Violent Elizabeth, Eebagoom, Hugh's Zoo and D'ye Ken John Squeal and his Hopeless Hounds.

The venture was unsuccessful, in part because the comic cost 9p, with the Beano at the time only costing 4p and most of its rivals priced similarly. It merged with The Beezer on 24 February 1979.

==== BeanOLD ====
44-page special issue 4062, with cover date 21 November 2020, during a lockdown in the COVID-19 pandemic had an eight-page adult pullout named BeanOLD, with cartoons poking fun at British politicians such as Boris Johnson and Dominic Cummings, and with appearances by Greta Thunberg, Captain Tom, and footballer Marcus Rashford. The slogan was "2020 has been tough. So tough that even grown-ups need Beano".

== Beano Studios ==
In June 2016, DC Thomson launched Beano Studios, a spin-off media studio based in London and Dundee, to create media for children and expand The Beano franchise. The launch was marked in The Beano issue 3854, featuring a new cover design, updated logo, and the introduction of the website beano.com.

Michael Stirling, former chief editor, returned as head of the Dundee studio, with Jodie Morris, James Neal, Nigel Pickard, and Emma Scott joining in key roles. The website beano.com offers games, news, videos, and content that appeals to children and nostalgic parents alike, drawing over two million annual visitors. This online presence contributed to a 10% rise in comic sales by 2018.

Beano Studios quickly expanded its reach with the popular CBBC series Dennis & Gnasher: Unleashed! in 2017, which aired in over 90 countries and earned an International Emmy nomination. Building on this success, Beano Studios pursued new projects including a live-action Minnie the Minx show, another Dennis the Menace adaptation, and a Bananaman cartoon in collaboration with Fox Entertainment.

== Reception and legacy ==
Beano stamp issued by Royal Mail in 2012.

The Beano was an instant success upon release, and became the longest-running, weekly-issued comic of all time in 2018. Although interest in comic magazines dwindled, it survived surrounding setbacks. In the 1950s, it (and The Dandy) were unaffected by DC Thomson's magazine cancellations (selling over 100 million per year) that were caused by both paper rationing and public lack of interest. Alan Digby's attempt to boost sales with the 8-week "Missing Gnasher" plot in Dennis the Menace failed, but the story featured in newspapers and on radio broadcasts, causing people of all ages to contact Beano offices to voice their concerns. Roughly 31,000–41,000 copies are sold per week in the present day, but an estimated 2 billion Beano comic magazines have been sold in its lifetime. A 1997 television poll by the National Comics Awards selected it for the Best British Comic Ever award. Dennis the Menace would represent the comic when Royal Mail launched a special stamp collection in 2012, celebrating Britain's rich comic book history. The Dandy, Eagle, The Topper, Roy of the Rovers, Bunty, Buster, Valiant, Twinkle and 2000 AD were also featured.

Like The Dandy, The Beano is a definitive part of British pop culture. "It's refreshing to see how the [zany] principles that made it such a hit all those years ago have remained to this day." writes Coventry Evening Telegraph. Beano annuals are the most popular Christmas annual sold, and old issues sell for thousands at auctions. Lord Snooty is often used as a pejorative in British politics. DC Thomson considers the 1950s Beano's golden age possibly because of many commemorations based on the strips that first appeared from that decade: Dennis became the literal and metaphorical mascot of the magazine, his increasing popularity making him the last consistent cover star and his strips spawning three BBC animated adaptations; Minnie and the Bash Street Kids have a statue and a street named after the strip, respectively. The "anarchic" humour is credited as the key to the magazine's longevity, as well as its refusal to be condescending to its readers: "The Beano may have changed since the '30s but has always maintained its anti-authoritarian stance and steadfast refusal to treat children like idiots," theorised Morris Heggie.

My British-born grandparents made sure they passed down an important part of their culture by giving out Beano Annuals every year. I grew up on Beanos and Dandys in 1970s Canada, and become one of my country's leading kids' cartoonists, writing and drawing for Chickadee magazines and annuals, and creating a weekly comic strip for the Toronto Star. I'm forever in debt to the lowbrow lessons gleaned from Dennis and his ilk.

— Jay Stephens, 2003

The magazine is cited as an inspiration to many readers. Beano artists Emily McGorman-Bruce, Zoom Rockman, Jess Bradley, and Barrie Appleby were avid readers of the magazine and/or its annuals before they became creators of its new strips. Meanwhile, The Beano inspired comic artists Jay Stephens, Carolyn Edwards (Titan Comics) and webcomic creator Sarah Millman (NPC Tea, The Heart of Time) to either work in the creative industry or create their own stories. Alan Moore theorised the magazine influenced numerous British comic artists into reimagining American comics in the 1980s by pioneering the Dark Age. Guest chief-editors Nick Park, David Walliams, Joe Sugg, and Harry Hill are also fans of The Beano, with Park admitting "My dream job was always to work on The Beano and it's such an honour for me to be Guest Editor[.]"

Notable famous members of the old Dennis the Menace/Beano Club include Auberon Waugh, Mike Read, and Mark Hamill, as well as honorary members Paul Gascoigne, and Princes William and Harry. Chris Tarrant cited Dennis as his role model when he was a child, and Paul Rudd revealed Roger the Dodger was his favourite strip. Stella McCartney created tribute fashion to both The Beano and The Dandy, explaining they were "a huge part of my childhood" and wanted to celebrate "the next generation of Beano fans with a sustainable and practical range for kids who still share that ‘Beano’ spirit of these iconic characters". In music pop culture, the album Blues Breakers with Eric Clapton is nicknamed "The Beano Album" because Eric Clapton is holding issue 1242 on its cover.

=== Audience participation ===
Interaction with the audience is a historic practice in The Beano's history. Excluding fan clubs and merchandise, Comic Idol is a sporadic election in which readers vote for their favourite strips to keep in the magazine. Cancelled strips with the fewest votes include Little Plum, Baby Face Finlayson, Les Pretend, (Note: Although discontinued in 2007, the strips would later return to the magazine.) Calamity James, Crazy for Daisy, and Lord Snooty. Super School and Meebo and Zuky were nominees who won polls and became official strips in the following issues. Readers would find a voting slip covered with the candidates printed in an issue that they would fill out and mail to DC Thomson, but the creation of Beano's websites would allow real-time opinions from readers. Pets' Picture Gallery invited readers to send drawings of their pets to feature in the following issue.

Readers participated in the magazine's record-breaking stunts. In 1988, 100 children helped Euan Kerr and Beano scriptwriter Al Bernard recreate the front cover of issue 2396 on Scarborough Beach with Hann-Made Productions. It was awarded the Largest Comic Strip at 39950 square feet. Beano's 2018 comic competition to celebrate the opening of V&A Dundee was awarded the biggest competition to finish a comic strip with 650 participants.

Along with Nick Park's guest editor issue, the 70th anniversary coincided with Gnashional Menace Day, a CLIC Sargent-partnered event where readers could be sponsored "behaving like Dennis" for charity.

=== Controversy ===
The Beano has had a few controversies throughout its lifetime, but aspects have either been discontinued, phased out or changed to not cause offence. Its infamous changes are the removal of corporal punishment (e.g. Dennis the Menace often depicted receiving bottom spanks with a slipper by his furious father) and misbehaving characters abandoning slingshots—the latter irritating former readers for being a "politically correct" notion, usually highlighted with claim "Dennis has lost his menace".

Peanut stands to the masthead's left holding a slice of watermelon.

Racist depictions and terminology have been removed through the years as well. Little Plum's sub-title "Your redskin chum" was not included in its 2002 revival. The first masthead character was a caricatured design of a black boy named Peanut, mascot of the Little Peanut's Page of Fun joke page (appeared from issues 1 to 112), usually eating watermelon. His last masthead feature was in December 1947, but subsequent reprints of the first issues have removed him. Hard-Nut the Nigger and Musso the Wop have not had reprints since their last appearances, the latter being printed during World War II when Britain was at war with Fascist Italy. (Note: Mussolini the Wop's example reprint in The History of The Beano has "Wop" conspicuously hidden underneath a drawing of war planes flying past the Leaning Tower of Pisa.)

The Beano has often faced accusations of encouraging and downplaying bullying. In 2011, a strip that had recently started, Uh Oh, Si Co! was accused by News of the World of encouraging readers to mock children with mental illness, which led to the strip's cancellation after just three issues. Dennis and Gnasher's constant targeting of passive, diligent Walter "the Softy" (who was also a knitting and flower-picking hobbyist) was frequently accused of encouraging playground homophobia; to address this, the comic rewrote Walter to be a more antagonistic figure. The "softy" pejorative was dropped, Walter was given a girlfriend, and the conflict between Dennis and Walter evolved to be based around Walter's dislike of fun and his father's conservative policies as Mayor of Beanotown.

In 2021, Fatty from the Bash Street Kids was renamed Freddy (his real name), causing backlash from former readers, including then-government minister Jacob Rees-Mogg who accused the change of being "publicity-seeking". Former chief-editor Mike Stirling explained it was due to fan letters from young readers asking why he was nicknamed so: "although it's always been used affectionately, and never pejoratively, we agreed it's time it changed." Seven months later, fellow Bash Street Kid Spotty was renamed Scotty for the same reason.

== See also ==
- The Beano Summer Special
- The Beano Annual
- List of magazines published in Scotland
- British comics
- List of Beano comic strips
- List of Beano comic strips by annual
- The Beano timeline

== Bibliography ==
- Anderson, John, ed. (2018). Beano: 80 Years of Fun. Fleet Street, London: DC Thomson. ISBN 9781845357023.
- McAleer, Joseph (1992). Popular Reading and Publishing in Britain, 1914-1950. Oxford [England]: Clarendon Press. ISBN 0198203292.
- Riches, Christopher, ed. (2008). The History of The Beano: The Story So Far. Dundee (DC Thomson); New Lanark (Waverly Books): DC Thomson; Waverly Books. ISBN 978-1-902407-73-9.
- Anderson, John, ed. (2018). Minnie: 65 Years of Minxing!. Fleet Street, London: D.C. Thomson & Co. Ltd. ISBN 9781845357382.
