= List of Beano comic strips =

The Beano is a British anthology comic magazine created by Scottish publishing company DC Thomson. The Beano has featured comedic strips, adventure strips, and prose stories. Prose stories were, however, phased out in 1955 and adventure strips were phased out in 1975 – the last one being General Jumbo. The longest-running strip in The Beano, originally titled Dennis the Menace (currently titled Dennis and Gnasher), first appeared in 1951. Other long-running characters and series include Biffo the Bear, Minnie the Minx, Roger the Dodger, The Bash Street Kids, Little Plum and Billy Whizz. As of 2015, The Beano had been home to 371 different strips (with a further 17 strips appearing in Comic Idol competitions, but not in any later comics).

This list only features strips in the weekly comic, and does not list strips that only appeared once. It also includes the Comic Idol winners from 1995 to 2010.

== Comic strips ==
| Strip title | Notes | Original artist | Other notable artists | Start date | End date |
|---|---|---|---|---|---|
| Big Eggo | Was the first cover star from issue 1 on 30 July 1938 until issue 326 on 10 January 1948. Returned on 7 March 2018. (Returned for 25 issues from issue 3925 on 10 March 2018 to issue 3950 on 1 September 2018). | Reg Carter | Lew Stringer | 1938 2018 | 1949 2018 |
| Ping the Elastic Man | | Hugh McNeill | | 1938 | 1940 |
| Brave Captain Kipper | About an elderly sailor who was the 'diehard of the Seven Seas'. | Torelli Bros | | 1938 | 1939 |
| Lord Snooty and his Pals | Four series. First from issue 1 on 30 July 1938 to issue 367 on 30 July 1949. Second from issue 440 on 23 December 1950 to issue 811 on 1 February 1958. Third from issue 904 on 14 November 1959 to issue 2565 on 14 September 1991. | Dudley Watkins | Leo Baxendale, Robert Nixon, Jimmy Glen, Ken Harrison | 1938 | 1991 |
| Whoopee Hank | | Roland Davies | | 1938 | 1939 |
| Hooky's Magic Bowler Hat | | Charles Gordon | | 1938 | 1940 |
| Wee Peem | Three series. First from issue 1 on 30 July 1938 to issue 89 on 6 April 1940. Second entitled Wee Peem's Magic Pills ran from issue 486 on 10 November 1951 to issue 507 on 5 April 1952. Third series with the title changed to just Wee Peem ran from issue 714 on 24 March 1956 to issue 765 on 16 March 1957. | James Jewell | Charles Griggs, Hugh Morren | 1938 | 1957 |
| Little Dead Eye Dick | Three series. First from issue 1 on 30 July 1938 to issue 20 on 10 December 1938. Second from issue 362 on 28 May 1949 to 368 on 6 August 1949. The third and final appeared between issue 375 on 24 September 1949 and issue 410 on 27 May 1950. | Charles Holt | | 1938 | 1950 |
| Hairy Dan | | Basil Blackaller | | 1938 | 1946 |
| Contrary Mary | Comic strip about a stubborn mule. The strip's main character reappeared as one of Lord Snooty's Pals in 1950. | Roland Davies | | 1938 | 1940 |
| Smiler the Sweeper | | Steve Perkins | | 1938 | 1938 |
| Helpful Henry | | Eric Roberts | | 1938 | 1939 |
| Big Fat Joe | The strip's main character reappeared as one of Lord Snooty's Pals in 1950. | Allan Morley | | 1938 | 1939 |
| Rip Van Wink | About a man who had slept for 700 years and his reaction to the modern (1930s) world. Name references the short story Rip Van Winkle. Two series, the first of which ran for ten years from issue 1 on 30 July 1938 to issue 336 on 29 May 1948, and the second of which lasted from issue 857 on 20 December 1958 to issue 866 on 21 February 1959. | Eric Roberts | Gordon Bell | 1938 | 1959 |
| Uncle Windbag | Three series. First from issue 1 on 30 July 1938 to issue 20 on 10 December 1938. Second from issue 579 on 22 August 1953 to issue 596 on 19 December 1953. Third from issue 744 on 20 October 1956 to issue 763 on 2 March 1957. | Charles Holt | Charles Grigg, Bill Ritchie | 1938 | 1957 |
| Monkey Tricks | | Reg Carter | | 1938 | 1938 |
| Tin Can Tommy | | Torelli Bros | | 1938 | 1947 |
| Hicky the Hare | | Torelli Bros | | 1938 | 1939 |
| Good King Coke | Two series. First was from issue 21 on 10 December 1938 to issue 177 on 11 April 1942. Second was from issue 256–300 in 1945–1946. | Eric Roberts | | 1938 | 1946 |
| Frosty McNab | | Sam Fair | | 1938 | 1941 |
| Pansy Potter | Also appeared in Sparky. Four series. First from issue 21 on 10 December 1938 to issue 325 on 27 December 1947. Second titled Pansy Potter in Wonderland from issue 369 on 13 August 1949 to issue 652 on 15 January 1955. Third series with original title appeared from issue 812 on 8 February 1958 to issue 854 on 29 November 1958. Fourth series from issue 2474 on 16 December 1989 to issue 2640 on 20 February 1993. | Hugh McNeil | Basil Blackaller, Sam Fair, James Clark, Charles Grigg, Gordon Bell, Barry Glennard | 1938 | 1993 |
| Boney the Brave | | Roland Davies | | 1939 | 1939 |
| Puffing Billy | | Hugh McNeill | | 1939 | 1940 |
| Tricky Dicky Ant | Two series. First from issue 38 on 15 April 1939 to issue 62 on 30 September 1939. Second from issue 358 on 2 April 1949 to issue 374 on 17 September 1949. | Torelli Bros | James Clark, Allan Morley | 1939 | 1949 |
| The Pranks of Peanut | | Charles Gordon | | 1939 | 1939 |
| Deep Down Daddy Neptune | | Basil Blackaller | | 1939 | 1940 |
| Wily Willie Winkie | | Unknown | | 1939 | 1940 |
| Laddie Longlegs | | Unknown | | 1939 | 1939 |
| Cocky Dick | | Allan Morley | | 1939 | 1947 |
| Winken and Blinken | | Sam Fair | | 1940 | 1941 |
| Doubting Thomas | The strip's main character reappeared as one of Lord Snooty's Pals in 1950. | James Crighton | | 1940 | 1942 |
| Cinderella and the Ugly Sisters | | Basil Blackaller | | 1940 | 1941 |
| Big Heep | | Basil Blackaller | | 1940 | 1942 |
| Musso the Wop | Featured the slapstick antics of Benito Mussolini. | Sam Fair | | 1940 | 1943 |
| The Magic Lollipops | Featured a boy with lollipops that would turn into what you wanted if you licked them. Two series. First was from issue 152 on 21 June 1941 to issue 306 on 5 April 1947 and the second was from issue 344 on 18 September 1948 to issue 475 on 25 August 1951. | Allan Morley | | 1941 | 1951 |
| Handy Sandy | Two series. First appeared between issue 175 on 14 March 1942 and issue 199 on 13 February 1943, the second between 242 on 7 October 1944 and issue 255 on 7 April 1945. | Arthur Jackson | | 1942 | 1945 |
| Little Nell and Peter Pell | About a girl called Nell and her pet pelican called Peter. | Allan Morley | | 1945 | 1947 |
| Smart Alec | | Basil Blackaller | | 1945 | 1945 |
| Polly Wolly Doodle and her Great Big Poodle | The strip's main characters reappeared as one of Lord Snooty's Pals in 1950. | George Drysdale | | 1946 | 1947 |
| Sammy Shrinko | A strip about a boy with a shrink ray. | Allan Morley | | 1946 | 1948 |
| Sticky Willie | | Unknown | | 1946 | 1947 |
| Wavy Davy and his Navy | | Dudley Watkins | | 1947 | 1947 |
| Alf Wit the Ancient Brit | About a plucky young caveman who wore sandals exposing his toes as opposed to leather shoes. Only appeared in two issues, though lots of unused material was drawn up. | Bill Holroyd | | 1947 | 1947 |
| Freddy Flipperfeet | | Reg Carter | | 1947 | 1948 |
| Maxy's Taxi | About a man called Maxy and his Taxi. | George Drysdale | | 1947 | 1951 |
| Winnie the Witch | | James Clark | | 1948 | 1948 |
| Peter Penguin | | Reg Carter | | 1948 | 1949 |
| Biffo the Bear | Was the second cover star from issue 327 on 24 January 1948 until issue 1677 on 7 September 1974. Three series. First from issue 327 on 24 January 1948 to issue 2310 on 25 October 1986. Second from issue 2445 on 27 May 1989 to issue 2954 on 27 February 1999. | Dudley Watkins | David Sutherland, Jimmy Glen, Sid Burgon | 1948 | 1999 and 2013 |
| Cocky Jock | | George Drysdale | | 1948 | 1949 |
| Swanky Lanky Liz | The strip's main character reappeared as one of Lord Snooty's Pals in 1950. | Charles Holt | | 1948 | 1949 |
| Smarty Smokum | | Allan Morley | | 1948 | 1949 |
| Hairy Hugh and his Cockatoo | | Basil Blackaller | | 1948 | 1949 |
| Have-A-Go Joe | Two series. First ran from 1949 to 1951. The second featuring the same main character but retitled "The Beano Cinema" ran in 1951. | Bill Holroyd | | 1949 | 1951 |
| Wandering Willie | | Bill Holroyd | | 1949 | 1949 |
| Ding-Dong Belle | | Bill Holroyd | | 1949 | 1951 |
| Danger! Len at Work | | Bill Holroyd | | 1949 | 1950 |
| Sammy's Super Rubber | | Allan Morley | | 1950 | 1951 |
| Dennis the Menace | The third cover star from issue 1678 on 14 September 1974. | David Law | David Sutherland, David Parkins, Nigel Parkinson, Jimmy Hansen, Tom Paterson Barrie Appleby Nigel Parkinson | 1951 | Present |
| Skinny Flint | | Basil Blackaller | | 1951 | 1951 |
| Bucktooth the Boy who Lives in a Barrel | Two series. First from issue 464 on 9 June 1951 to issue 487 on 17 November 1951 and the second from issue 503 on 8 March 1952 to issue 512 on 10 May 1952. | Bill Holroyd | | 1951 | 1952 |
| Willie's Wonder Gun | | James Clark | | 1951 | 1952 |
| Multy the Millionaire | | Richard Cox | | 1952 | 1953 |
| Wee Davie | Seven series. First from issue 513 on 17 May 1952 to issue 518 on 21 June 1952. Second from issue 568 on 6 June 1953 to issue 582 on 12 September 1953. Third from issue 615 on 1 May 1954 to issue 616 on 8 May 1954. Fourth from issue 619 on 29 May 1954 to issue 625 on 10 July 1954. Fifth from issue 659 on 5 March 1955 to issue 667 on 30 April 1955. Sixth retitled 'Wee Davie and King Willie' ran from issue 680 on 30 July 1955 to issue 712 on 10 March 1956. Seventh series ran from issue 760 on 9 February 1957 to issue 798 on 2 November 1957 with the same title as the previous one. | Ken Hunter | | 1952 | 1957 |
| Kat and Kanary | Three series. First from issue 526 on 16 August 1952 to issue 713 on 17 March 1956. The second from issue 770 on 20 April 1957 to issue 794 on 5 October 1957. The third from issue 819 on 29 March 1958 to issue 841 on 30 August 1958. | Charles Grigg | Leo Baxendale, Albert Holroyd, Gordon Bell | 1952 | 1958 |
| The Nippers | | Richard Cox | | 1952 | 1953 |
| Roger the Dodger | Two series. First from issue 561 on 18 April 1953 to issue 928 on 30 April 1960. The second began on issue 980 on 29 April 1961 and is still ongoing. | Ken Reid | Gordon Bell, Bob McGrath, Robert Nixon, Tom Lavery, Frank MacDiarmid, Barrie Appleby, Jamie Smart | 1953 | Present |
| Big Hugh and You | One of the first strips to feature the reader as a character. | Bill Holroyd | | 1953 | 1953 |
| Matt Hatter | | George Drysdale | | 1953 | 1955 |
| Little Plum | Four Series. First from issue 586 on 10 October 1953 to issue 2310 on 25 October 1986. Second from issue 2436 on 25 March 1989 to issue 2470 on 18 November 1989. Third series ran from issue 3154 on 28 December 2002 to issue 3364 on 20 January 2007. The fourth series consisting of reprints of the third series ran in 2011. Fifth series began in 2013. Fifth series began in 2013. | Leo Baxendale | Ron Spencer, Tom Paterson, Hunt Emerson | 1953 | 2015 |
| Minnie the Minx | Was the fourth cover star for the Christmas issue celebrating her 60th anniversary in issue 3715 on 14 December 2013. | Leo Baxendale | Jim Petrie, Tom Paterson, Ken Harrison, Laura Howell, Nigel Parkinson | 1953 | Present |
| When the Bell Rings (name changed to The Bash Street Kids in issue 748 on 17 November 1956) | | Leo Baxendale | David Sutherland | 1954 | Present |
| Jenny Penny | | Jimmy Thompson | | 1954 | 1955 |
| Dick on the Draw | | Jimmy Thompson | | 1955 | 1955 |
| Clumsy Claude-The Blunder Boy | | Bill Ritchie | | 1955 | 1955 |
| Prince Whoopee | Two series. First from issue 680 on 30 July 1955 to issue 759 on 2 February 1957. Second from issue 799 on 9 November 1957 to issue 841 on 30 August 1958. | Charles Grigg | George Drysdale | 1955 | 1958 |
| Scrapper | Two series. A spin-off of the Lord Snooty strip starring Scrapper Smith. First from issue 680 on 30 July 1955 to issue 769 on 13 April 1957. Second from issue 880 on 30 May 1959 to issue 890 on 8 August 1959. | George Drysdale/Albert Holroyd | | 1955 | 1959 |
| Grandpa | Two series. First from issue 680 on 30 July 1955 to issue 798 on 2 November 1957. The second ran from issue 1522 on 18 September 1971 to issue 2200 on 15 September 1984. | Ken Reid | Robert Nixon, Jimmy Glen | 1955 | 1984 |
| Our Ned | | Albert Holroyd | | 1956 | 1958 |
| Daniel the Spaniel | | Ken Hunter | | 1956 | 1956 |
| Johnny on the Hop (He brings The Beano from the Shop) | | George Drysdale | | 1956 | 1956 |
| Pooch | | Bill Ritchie | | 1957 | 1957 |
| Parachute Reg | | Albert Holroyd | | 1957 | 1957 |
| Wizards at War | | Charles Grigg | | 1957 | 1957 |
| Dippy the Diver | | Hugh Morren | | 1957 | 1957 |
| Fusspot Annie | | Jimmy Thompson | | 1957 | 1958 |
| Bringing up Dennis | Dennis the Menace spinoff with Dennis as a baby. | Ken Wilkins | | 1957 | 1958 |
| Quick An' Slick | | Frank MacDarmiad | | 1957 | 1958 |
| Pom-Pom (The Boy who Brightens Darkest Africa) | | Gordon Bell | | 1958 | 1958 |
| Jonah | | Ken Reid | | 1958 | 1963 |
| Cookie | | Ken Wilkins | | 1958 | 1958 |
| Betty's Grandad | | Hugh Morren | | 1958 | 1958 |
| Dashalong Dot | | Gordon Bell | | 1958 | 1959 |
| Joe for Champ | | Hugh Morren | | 1959 | 1959 |
| The Three Bears | Five series. First in 1959. The second ran from 1960 to 1985. The third ran from 1988 to 1995. The fourth series ran from 1999 to 2007. The fifth series consisting of reprints of the fourth series between 2010 and 2011. | Leo Baxendale | Bob McGrath, Bob Dewar, David Parkins, Mike Pearse, Chris McGhie, Alan Ryan | 1959 | 2016 |
| Lazy Jones | | Hugh Morren | | 1960 | 1960 |
| Wonder Boy | | Bob McGrath | | 1960 | 1961 |
| Colonel Crackpot's Circus | | Malcolm Judge | | 1960 | 1963 |
| Punch and Jimmy | Two series. First ran from 1962 to 1963. The second ran from 1963 to 1967. | Dave Jenner | | 1962 | 1967 |
| The Country Cuzzins | About a group of six children who lived in the countryside. They were named Badger, Dicky, Dumpling, Daisy, Scarecrow and Happy. They also appeared in some of The Victor books for boys. | Hugh Morren | | 1963 | 1964 |
| Jinx | | Ken Reid | | 1963 | 1964 |
| Billy Whizz | | Malcolm Judge | Steve Horrocks, David Parkins, Trevor Metcalfe, Vic Neill, Graeme Hall, Wayne Thompson, Nick Brennan, Wilbur Dawbarn | 1964 | Present |
| Pup Parade | Four series. First from 1967 to 1988. Second ran in 2003. The third ran from 2011 to 2012. The fourth ran from 2016 to present. A run also appeared in The Topper between 1989 and 1990 before heading to the newly merged comic The Beezer and Topper with the strip continuing until 1993. | Gordon Bell | Nigel Parkinson, Lew Stringer | 1967 | Present |
| The Nibblers | Two series. First from 1970 to 1974. Second from 1977 to 1984. | John Sherwood/Ron Spencer | | 1970 | 1984 |
| The Belles of St. Lemons | | Gordon Bell | | 1971 | 1972 |
| The McTickles | Chief Jock and his highland clan fought a comic war of attrition against their rivals the McNasties, while avoiding the pranks played on them by the "McHaggises", small round animals with a similar shape to a haggis and with long noses and thistles for ears. Some McHaggises had legs of different length on opposite sides of their bodies, allowing them to remain horizontal while walking around the sides of mountains. The many types of 'McHaggises' included the Spiky Hedgehoggis, the Fiery McHaggis, the Roller McHaggis, and many others (This is in fact a common joke used by Scottish people when "explaining" the haggis to uninitiated visitors.) Another recurring comic device was to prefix "Mc" to important words and onomatopoeia. For example, if someone fired a gun, the sound would be written "McBang".The leader of The McTickles was named Chief Jock and the other Mctickles were Morag (Stroppy middle-aged woman), Murdo who had a long beard, Nickol who was one of the younger clan members, Donald who is also one of the younger clan members and some others who were never named. | Vic Neill | | 1971 | 1974 |
| Says Smiffy | Spin-off of The Bash Street Kids. It featured Smiffy testing out inventions sent in by Beano readers. | Jim Petrie | | 1971 | 1972 |
| Baby Face Finlayson | Four series. First from 1972 to 1977. Second from 1980 to 1987. Third from 1989 to 1992. Fourth from 2004 to 2005. | Ron Spencer | Emilios Hatjoulis | 1972 | 2005 |
| Wee Ben Nevis | | Vic Neill | | 1974 | 1977 |
| Richard the Lion | | David Gudgeon | | 1974 | 1976 |
| Ball Boy | First series from 1975 until April 2014. Second from August 2014 and is ongoing in Summer Specials. | Malcolm Judge | John Dallas, Dave Eastbury, Alexander Matthews, Chris McGhie | 1975 | 2025 |
| Tom, Dick and Sally | | Dave Jenner/Keith Reynolds | | 1975 | 1986 |
| Jacky Daw with Maw and Paw | About an obnoxious teenage Jackdaw and his parents' attempts to better him. | David Gudgeon | | 1976 | 1978 |
| Two Gun Tony | | Bill Ritchie | | 1977 | 1978 |
| Gnasher's Tale name changed to Gnasher and Gnipper in 1986 | Two series. First from 1977 until 2009. Second from 2014 and is ongoing. | David Sutherland | Barry Glennard Barrie Appleby | 1977 | present |
| The Fix-It Twins | About two fraternal twins called Mo and Jo. With an obsession for making people's dreams come true. Title is a play on the TV show Jim'll Fix it. | Ron Spencer | | 1978 | 1980 |
| Sweet Sue | About Sue, a sweet and inoffensive young girl who always gets the better of bullies Harriet and Mabel. | Bill Ritchie | | 1978 | 1980 |
| Smudge | | John Geering | Alan Ryan | 1980 | Early 2015 |
| Rasher | Two series. First ran from 1984 to 1995. A second consisting of reprints of the first series ran in 2009. | David Sutherland | | 1984 | 2016 |
| Pepper the Pony and Lucinda | | Ron Spencer | | 1984 | 1985 |
| Ivy the Terrible | Three series. First ran from 1985 to 2008. The second ran from 2009 to 2011. The third ran from 2014 to 2017. | Robert Nixon | Tony O'Donnell, Diego Jourdan, Lew Stringer | 1985 | 2017 |
| Simply Smiffy | Originally ran from 1985 to 1987. Made a return on a half page strip in 2015 | Jerry Swaffield | Paul Palmer | 1985 | 1987 2016 |
| Foo Foo's Fairy Story | Originally ran in 1986 with Gnasher being missing. | Dave Sutherland | | 1986 | 1986 |
| Roger the Dodger's Dodge Clinic | | Robert Nixon | | 1986 | 1992 |
| Calamity James | Three series. First ran from 1986 to 2007. A second series ran from 2009 to 2011 and a third began in 2012. | Tom Paterson | Steve Bright, Les Stannage | 1986 | Present |
| Little Monkey | First appeared in 1986 in the reader's request feature. Started regularly in 1987. | Robert Nixon | Barrie Appleby | 1986 | 1988 |
| Karate Sid | Title was a play on Karate Kid. About a karate loving kid who often fought with his enemies The Dans. Later Returned as a spin-off in 2013 to celebrate 75 years of The Beano. | Steve Bright | | 1987 | 1988 And 2013 |
| Number 13 | Two series. First ran from 1987 to 1997. The second ran from 2011 to 2012 and consisted of reprints of the first series with the title changed to 'Number 13 Beano street'. Returned in 2014 as a Funsize Funny before being promoted to a full page strip for the third Third series ended in July 2014. Number 13 then returned for The Beano Halloween Special 2015 for one issue only. | John Geering | Alan Ryan | 1987 | 2014 And 2015 |
| The Germs & Ill Will | Two series. First ran from 1987 to 2004. A second series retitled 'Totally Gross Germs' consisting of reprints of the first series ran from 2011 to 2012. | Dave Sutherland | Vic Neill | 1987 | 2012 |
| Gordon Gnome | | Eric Wilkinson | | 1988 | 1989 |
| Danny's Nanny | | David Mostyn | | 1988 | 1994 |
| Proctor Doolittle | | Ron Spencer | | 1988 | 1989 |
| Fatty Fudge | | Jim Petrie | | 1989 | 1991 |
| Emlyn the Gremlin | | Bob Dewar | | 1989 | 1990 |
| Little Larry | | Tom Paterson | | 1989 | 1992 |
| Les Pretend | Two series. First ran from 1990 to 2005. The second ran from 2008 to 2010. | John Sherwood | Trevor Metcalfe | 1990 | 2017 |
| Lee's Fleas | | Bob Dewar | | 1990 | 1991 |
| Henry Burrows | | Trevor Metcalfe | | 1992 | 1992 |
| Merboy | | Emilios Hatjoulis | | 1992 | 1992 |
| Son of Jonah | | Jerry Swaffield | | 1992 | 1993 |
| The Great Geraldoes | | Terry Brave | | 1992 | 1993 |
| The Beano Birds | | Barry Glennard | | 1992 | 1993 |
| Go, Granny, Go! | A strip about Dennis' Grandmother. | Brian Walker | | 1992 | 1998 |
| Oscar Knight-Child Actor | | David Sutherland | | 1992 | 1993 |
| The Yeti with Betty | Originally ran from 1993 to 1994, but returned in 2016. | Robert Nixon | Hugh Raine | 1993 | Present |
| The Numskulls | Originally featured in The Beezer comic from 1962 to 1990. | Tom Paterson | Barry Glennard, Nigel Auchterlounie | 1993 | Present |
| Vic Volcano | About a boy with a literally fiery temper. | Robert Nixon | Trevor Metcalfe | 1995 | 1996 |
| The World's Worst | | Bob Dewar | | 1995 | 1998 |
| What to do with a Sleeping Dad | Minnie the Minx spin-off. | Jim Petrie | | 1995 | 1997 |
| Joe King | Joe King, whose name was a pun on joking, wore a big red cap, and would tell jokes sent in by Beano readers. Originally readers whose jokes were published would win a Dennis the Menace bicycle helmet. Later on came Joe's Joke Corner which would occupy a corner of the page (usually Billy Whizz and Crazy for Daisy), again featuring jokes from Beano readers, as did Anyone Got Any Jokes? from 2001, and also Joe King's Top 40 Joke Box. On The Beano Club pages for a while in 2002 there was Joe's Joke Spot. He appears briefly in The Beano Christmas Special 2007 along with all The Beano stars of a few years earlier, as the story was a reprint. Due to Billy Whizz being reprinted as well, a Joke Corner appeared once in June 2008, and again in January 2009. In 2015, he returned as a Funsize Funnie by Lew Stringer. | Bob Dewar | Lew Stringer | 1995 | 2001 |
| Tim Traveller | | Vic Neill | Keith Reynolds | 1997 | 2004 |
| Crazy for Daisy | | Nick Brennan | | 1997 | 2008 |
| Even Steven | | Steve Simpson | Nigel Parkinson | 1998 | 2000 |
| Beaginnings, later Bea the Mini-Menace | | Nigel Parkinson | | 1998 | 2008 |
| Mr Ape | Serialisation of a Dick King-Smith story. | John Eastwood | | 1998 | 1998 |
| Dean's Dino | | John Geering | | 1999 | 1999 |
| Dog's Breakfast TV | | Steven Baskerville | | 1999 | 1999 |
| Splodge | | Ken Harrison | | 2000 | 2001 |
| Come to Beanotown | | John Rushby | | 2000 | 2002 |
| Dasher | | Gary Whitlock | | 2001 | 2001 |
| Freddie Fear Son of a Witch | | Dave Eastbury | | 2002 | 2012 |
| Robbie Rebel | Two series. First ran from 2002 to 2008. The second ran from 2010 to 2011. | Ken Harrison | | 2002 | 2011 |
| Hotfoot | | From an Agency | | 2002 | 2002 |
| Doctor Beastly's Tales of the Slightly Unpleasant | | Brian Walker | | 2002 | 2002 |
| Ricky Grainger He Laughs at Danger | | Tom Plant | | 2003 | 2003 |
| Joe Jitsu | Similar to 80s strip Karate Sid. | Wayne Thompson | | 2004 | 2006 |
| Colin the Vet | The strip was about a veterinarian called Colin, who encounters all sorts of crazy animals. The title was a pun on the phrase "call in the vet". It was one of the nominees to be voted into The Beano by readers in early 2004. Although Joe Jitsu won, it was only a 1% victory over Colin, so both were added to The Beano. A running gag in the strip included hidden "Celebrity Pets", which are fictional pets owned by famous people. Many of the pets' descriptions are puns on the name of the celebrity. (Such as "Ant and Dec's Ant on decks"). | Duncan Scott | | 2004 | 2006 |
| Derek the Sheep | | Gary Northfield | | 2004 | 2009 |
| Bash Street Kids - Singled Out | | Mike Pearse | Tom Paterson | 2004 | 2009 |
| Zap Zodiac | | Steve Horrocks | | 2005 | 2005 |
| Gordon Bennett | Second Series. First was a Comic Idol Runner-up. | Jimmy Hansen | | 2005 | 2005 |
| The Neds | | Duncan Scott | | 2005 | 2007 |
| Nicky Nutjob | | Kelly Dyson | Nick Brennan, Wayne Thompson | 2006 | 2007 |
| Big Brad Wolf | | Ken Harrison | | 2006 | 2006 |
| Ratz | Developed by artist Hunt Emerson to replace the retired strip Little Plum, which he had worked on since 2002. The stories follow the lives of a group of rats who live in the sewers beneath Beanotown, the main characters being Keef (the nominal leader), Rod (a spiv), and Herman, their naive sidekick. Other characters, such as Patti, Rubella and RastaRat make occasional appearances. Hunt Emerson was the original artist, with Laura Howell inking in his pencils from October 2006 onwards and on occasion drawing the strip. In The Beano Annual 2008, Ratz is changed to "Its a Ratz Life!" because the usual Ratz characters were not the main focus, but instead a pair of Ratz setting up home together (on a rubbish dump), and this strip was done before the strip first appeared in the comic itself (when the strip was going to be given that title). Laura Howell has announced that with Hunt Emerson drawing the Fred's Bed strip (which was previously reprints), she will be drawing Ratz as well as writing it. In a couple of issues in September 2011, Ratz was the first strip inside the comic, a slot usually reserved for Dennis and Gnasher, although Dennis appeared on the cover as usual. Before this strip was Rats, a very similar strip about smelly rodents in a sewer, although these bunch were more friends. It was drawn by Terry Bave and Nigel Parkinson, appearing in the 1994–2003 Beezer Books and The Dandy issue 3281. | Hunt Emerson | Laura Howell | 2006 | 2013 |
| Pirates of the Caribeano | | Barrie Appleby | | 2006 | 2009 |
| Fred's Bed | First series in The Beano, reprinted from Beezer and Topper. | David Parkins | Tom Paterson (reprints), Hunt Emerson, David Sutherland, Tom Paterson, Nigel Parkinson (all new strips) | 2007 | 2012 |
| The Riot Squad | Reprints from Hoot. | Ken Harrison | | 2007 | 2008 |
| Tales of Johnny Bean from Happy Bunny Green | | Laura Howell | | 2007 | 2010 |
| London B412 | | Barrie Appleby | | 2007 | 2008 |
| Olaff the Madlander | Reprints from The Beezer and Topper. | Sid Burgon | | 2008 | 2008 |
| Lord Snooty the Third | | Nigel Parkinson | | 2008 | 2011 |
| Bea and Ivy | This strip used characters from the two previously separate strips of Ivy the Terrible and Bea the Mini-Menace. | Nigel Parkinson | | 2008 | 2009 |
| Super School | | Lew Stringer | | 2008 | 2012 |
| Beano Manga | | Laura Howell | | 2009 | 2011 |
| Sixty Second Dennis | | Nigel Parkinson | Tom Paterson/Barrie Appleby | 2009 | 2011 |
| Meebo and Zuky | | Laura Howell | | 2010 | 2013 |
| The Bea Team | The third series involving Dennis the Menace's younger sister. | Nigel Parkinson | | 2010 | 2010 |
| Gnasher's Bit(e) | Second Series involving Gnasher as the main character. | Barrie Appleby | Jimmy Hansen | 2011 | 2013 |
| At Home with the BSK! | Short lived Bash Street Kids spinoff. | David Sutherland | | 2011 | 2011 |
| Dangerous Dan | The strip is about a boy who thinks he is a secret agent and believes that an organisation called SMIRK, (Secret Ministry of Intelligent Rotters Komittee) is conspiring against him. Two Series. First: 2011 – 2011 Second: 2015 – Present Only in The Beano every two issues. | Nigel Parkinson | Paul Palmer | 2011 | Present |
| The Adventures of Wenlock and Mandeville | Partnership for 2012 London Olympics. | Nigel Parkinson | | 2011 | 2012 |
| Bananaman | First Series in The Beano (reprints) also appeared in The Dandy and The Nutty. | John Geering | Barrie Appleby, Tom Paterson, Steve Bright, Chris McGhie, Wayne Thompson | 2012 | Present |
| Belle's Magic Mobile | Only appeared twice. | Steve English | | 2012 | 2012 |
| Beano's Got Talent | Had a short run and disappeared after four weeks. | Dave Mostyn | | 2012 | 2012 |
| Big Time Charlie | Ended in July 2013. | Alexander Matthews | | 2013 | 2013 |
| Tricky Dicky | Previously appeared in The Topper who also appeared in The Beano a few times around the turn of the millennium as a guest star trying to be voted in. This strip follows the adventures of a new Tricky Dicky. The first series ended in July 2013, and the second started in January 2014. As of 2021, however, it seems to have been replaced by Har Har's Joke Shop. | Rianne Rowlands | Laura Howell | 2013 | 2021 |
| Fight My Monster | Previously appeared in The BeanoMAX. Appeared in The Beano every four issues. | Unknown | | 2013 | 2013 |
| El Poco Loco | | Jamie Smart | | 2013 | 2013 |
| Teenage Mutant Ninja Turkeys | Parody of Teenage Mutant Ninja Turtles. | Dean Rankine | | 2013 | 2013 |
| Will.i.am the Conqueror | | Laura Howell | | 2013 | 2013 |
| Wallace and Gromit | Previously appeared in The BeanoMAX. (Previously appeared in the 2012 Christmas issue). | Andy Janes | | 2013 | 2015 |
| Mega Mega Mootants | | Steve Beckett | | 2013 | 2013 |
| The Castle Rock | | Gary Boller | | 2013 | 2013 |
| Pie Face | Dennis the Menace spin-off featuring Pie Face. Originally featured in The Dennis the Menace and Gnasher Megazine before it was renamed to Dennis the Menace and Gnasher's Epic Magazine. Now appears in The Beano week. | Diego Jourdan | Emily McGorman-Bruce | 2014 | 2015 |
| Gwynedd's Book of Records | | Stephen Waller | | 2014 | 2014 |
| Fun Kids | Based on the kids radio station Fun Kids. | Barrie Appleby | | 2014 | 2016 |
| My Menace Name later renamed to Make me A Menace | This strip doesn't feature regular characters; instead readers send in their suggestions for a character, and a cartoon is created based on their idea featuring themselves as the star. | Hunt Emerson | | 2015 | present |
| Adventure Tim | | Alan Ryan | | 2015 | 2015 |
| Dawgtective | | Marc Jackson | | 2015 | 2015 |
| Holly Wood | | Steve Beckett | | 2015 | 2016 |
| Jungle Judy | | Sharp Bros. | | 2015 | 2016 |
| Hayley Comet | | Steve Beckett | | 2015 | 2016 |
| Skanky Pigeon | | Zoom Rockman | | 2015 | 2016 |
| Shouty McShoutface | | Mel Prats | | 2016 | 2017 |
| Zoo-Ella | Funny animal parody of the YouTuber Zoella. | Gary Northfield | | 2016 | 2017 |
| Shouty McShoutface | | | | 2016 | 2016 |
| Time for Toots | Spin off from The Bash Street Kids. | Steve Beckett | | 2016 | 2016 |
| Angel Face | Spin off from Dennis the Menace and Gnasher. | Barrie Appleby | | 2016 | 2016 |
| Har Har's Joke Shop | Beanotown's joke shop and the funny family that own it. | Emily McGorman-Bruce | | 2021 | Present |
| JJ | Based on a character featured in Dennis & Gnasher: Unleashed! | Wayne Thompsom | | 2021 | Present |
| Angel Face Investigates | Based on a character featured in Dennis the Menace and Gnasher (2009 TV series). But now she's a detective. Angel Face was also the name of a short lived comic strip in the Dandy. | George Gant | | 2021 | Present |
| Rubi's Screwtop Science | Based on a character featured in Dennis & Gnasher: Unleashed!. Her father is Professor Screwtop a rebooted version of character who originally appeared in Lord Snooty. | Rianne Rowlands | Emily McGorman-Bruce | 2017 (TV); 2019 (strip) | Present |
| Stevie Star | About a wannabe influencer. He joined The Bash Street Kids. | Nick Brennan | | 2022 | 2025 |
| Sketch Khad | About a hijab wearing girl whose sketches come to life. He joined The Bash Street Kids. | Emily McGorman-Bruce | | 2022 | 2025 |
| Mahira of the Match | Similar to Ball Boy but with a female lead. He joined The Bash Street Kids. | | | 2022 | 2025 |
| Terrible Tina - The Worlds Worst Babysitter | | | | 2025 | Present |

== Funsize Funnies ==
In 2012, The Beano began printing a new section called the Funsize Funnies. This section featured short three to four-panel comic strips. It originally featured old and existing Beano characters in its stories, but as time went on, the section began to feature celebrity parodies and wholly new characters.

| Strip title | Notes | Original artist | Other notable artists | Start date | End date |
|---|---|---|---|---|---|
| Little Plum | Previously appeared as a regular comic strip which ran from 1953 to 2014. | Laura Howell | Hunt Emerson | 2012 | 2015 |
| Pup Parade | Previously appeared as a regular comic strip in three separate series from 1967 to 2012. Spin off from The Bash Street Kids. | Nigel Auchterlounie | Steve Beckett, Lew Stringer | 2012 | 2014 |
| Baby Face Finlayson | Previously appeared as regular comic strip in four separate series from 1972 to 2005. | Alexander Matthews | | 2012 | 2013 |
| Rasher | Previously appeared as a regular strip from 1984 to 1995 before being reprinted in 2009. In July 2013 the Funsize Funnies strip's title was changed to Watch-Hog and the strip became a parody of the TV series Watchdog. The strip was then renamed to Rasher. Spin-off of Dennis the Menace and Gnasher. | Lew Stringer | | 2012 | 2016 |
| Simply Smiffy | Previously appeared as a regular strip from 1985 to 1987. Spin off of The Bash Street Kids. | Paul Palmer | | 2012 | 2016 |
| Les Pretend | Previously appeared as a regular strip from 1990 to 2007. | Laura Howell | Alan Ryan | 2012 | Present |
| Gnash Gnews | Spin-off of Dennis the Menace and Gnasher. | Barrie Appleby | | 2012 | 2013 |
| Winston | Spin off of The Bash Street Kids. | Paul Palmer | | 2012 | 2013 |
| Pansy Potter | Originally appeared in the comic in a number of separate series which ran from 1938 to 1993. | Nigel Parkinson | Kev F Sutherland | 2013 | 2014 |
| Biffo the Bear | Previously appeared as a regular strip from 1948 to 1999. | Wayne Thompson | Paul Palmer | 2013 | 2014 |
| Lord Snooty | Previously appeared as a regular strip in three separate series from 1938 to 1991. | Alexander Matthews | Lew Stringer | 2013 | 2014 |
| Gnasher and Gnipper | Spin-off of Dennis the Menace and Gnasher. | Graham Howie | | 2013 | 2013 |
| BSK CCTV | Spin off of The Bash Street Kids. | Paul Palmer | | 2013 | 2014 |
| BamBeanos | | Wayne Thompson | | 2013 | 2013 |
| Stunt Gran | In 2014, she made appearances in Grandpa. | Steve Beckett | | 2013 | 2013 |
| Hero or Zero? | | Rebecca Burgess | | 2013 | 2013 |
| Skanky Pigeon | Drawn by a 13-year-old. Appears in The Beano every four issues. | Zoom Rockman | | 2013 | Present |
| High School Moozical | | Steve Beckett | | 2013 | 2013 |
| Celebrity Believe It or Not | | Philip Neill | | 2013 | 2013 |
| Neigh-Bours | | Rick Eades | | 2013 | 2013 |
| I Pity the School | A reprint from The Dandy. | Alexander Matthews | | 2013 | 2013 |
| Murs Attacks | | Andy Fanton | | 2013 | 2013 |
| Ashley's Banjo | | Paul Palmer | | 2013 | 2013 |
| Coronation Bleat | | Stephen Waller | | 2013 | 2013 |
| Jose's Back... and This Time it's Personal | | Wayne Thompson | | 2013 | 2013 |
| Simon's Bowel | | Dean Rankine | | 2013 | 2013 |
| Guess Who? | | Garry Davies | | 2013 | 2013 |
| Danny Diddly O'Donoghue | | Alan Ryan | | 2013 | 2013 |
| The Bone Ranger | Parody of The Lone Ranger. | Steve Beckett | | 2013 | 2013 |
| The Forsyth Saga – How old is Brucie | | Wayne Thompson | | 2013 | 2013 |
| Handy Murray | | Paul Palmer | | 2013 | 2013 |
| Smiffy's Top Tips | | Paul Palmer | | 2013 | 2013 |
| The Incredible Skunk | | Gary Boller | | 2013 | 2013 |
| Fatty's Kitchen Nightmares | | Mike Pearse | | 2013 | 2013 |
| Man VS. Wood | Parody of Man v. Food but every episode he has a contest against something wooden. | Nick Brennan | | 2013 | 2013 |
| Jessie's J | | Paul Palmer | | 2013 | 2013 |
| Not so Horrible Histories with Terry Deary | | | | 2013 | 2013 |
| Penguin Club | Name is a reference to Club Penguin. | | | 2013 | 2013 |
| Angel Face | Based on a character featured in Dennis the Menace and Gnasher (2009 TV series). She would later have a full size strip. | Deqo | | 2013 | 2013 |
| The Great Beanotown Face Off | Featuring Dennis the Menace and Walter. | Deqo | | 2013 | 2013 |
| The Fresh Prince of Buckingham Palace | Strip featuring Prince George of Cambridge and his parents. | Andy Fanton | | 2013 | 2013 |
| Doctor Flu | | Lew Stringer | | 2014 | 2014 |
| Grandpa | Previously appeared as a full page strip from 1955 to 1984. | Steve Beckett | | 2014 | 2014 |
| Karate Sid | Previously appeared as a full-page strip. | Paul Palmer | | 2014 | 2014 |
| Animals Crossing | | Stu Munro | | 2014 | 2014 |
| Ninja Nuns | | Andy Fanton | | 2013 | 2014 |
| Celebs on a Sledge | | Lew Stringer | | 2013 | 2014 |
| Breaking Dad | | Stu Munro | | 2013 | 2014 |
| Gnipper | | | | 2013 | 2014 |
| Bottom Gear | Parody of Top Gear. | | | 2013 | 2014 |
| Rubbish Robots | | Lew Stringer | | 2013 | 2014 |
| Rooney Tunes | | Alan Ryan (comics) | | 2013 | 2014 |
| Pun Direction | | Stu Munro | | 2014 | 2014 |
| Constable Caveman | | Andy Fanton | | 2014 | 2014 |
| Bea | Previously appeared as a full-page strip. Spin-off of Dennis the Menace and Gnasher. | Nigel Parkinson | | 2014 | 2015 |
| Tom, Dick and Sally | Previously appeared as a full-page strip. | Steve Beckett | | 2014 | 2014 |
| Emlyn the Gremlin | Previously appeared as a full-page strip. | Andy Fanton | | 2014 | 2015 |
| Lenny the Lettuce | | Marc Jackson | | 2014 | 2014 |
| Robin Rebel | One-off by a competition winner. | Robin Fitzgerald | | 2014 | 2014 |
| Kick-Ass Koalas | Previously appeared in The BeanoMAX. | Pete Player | | 2014 | 2014 |
| Ivy the Terrible | Previously appeared as a full page strip. | Lew Stringer | | 2014 | 2014 |
| No Direction | | Alan Ryan (comics) | | 2014 | 2015 |
| Beanotown Zoo | | Barry Glennard | | 2014 | 2015 |
| Sleepy Ed | | Paul Palmer | | 2015 | 2015 |
| Chewie Suarez | Won a competition against two other strips. | Alan Ryan | | 2015 | 2015 |
| Joe King | Originally appeared in 1995. | Lew Stringer | | 2015 | 2015 |
| Robopop | Parody of RoboCop. | Andy Fanton | | 2015 | 2015 |
| Mr. E | | Gary Boller | | 2015 | 2015 |
| The Bash Street Squelchies | Spin-off of The Bash Street Kids and Calamity James. | Les Stannage | | 2015 | 2015 |
| King of The Ring | Starring wrestling superstar Tommy King. | The Sharp Brothers | | 2015 | 2016 |
| Bannavengers | Spin-off of Bananaman. | | | 2015 | 2015 |
| Betty and the Yeti | | Hugh Raine | | 2015 | present |
| Jurassic play park | parody of Jurassic Park. | | | 2015 | 2015 |
| Dawgtective | | | | 2015 | 2015 |
| Movie Madness | Parodies of movies.Replaced Robopop. | | | 2015 | 2015 |
| Pant-Man | Replaced Jurassic play park. | | | 2015 | 2015 |
| Bash street behind the scenes | Spin off to the Bash street kids. | | | 2015 | 2015 |
| Minedaft | Spoof of Minecraft. | | | 2015 | 2015 |
| Bantersarous | | | | 2015 | 2015 |

== Adventure strips ==
From the first issue of The Beano up until 1975, there were adventure strips. After 1975, they only continued in the Annuals, but attempts were made to revive them in the regular issues in the 2000s. This included three new series of Billy the Cat and the release of The Beano Action Special. Some of these strips started off being adapted from earlier prose stories. The longest running adventure strips are Tom Thumb (1938–1958), Jack Flash (1949–1958), Jimmy and his Magic Patch (1944–1959), The Iron Fish (1949–1967), Red Rory of the Eagles (1951–1962), General Jumbo (1953–1975), and Billy the Cat (1967–1974, 2003–2009). Of these 7 long-running adventure strips, 3 began as Prose stories: Tom Thumb, The Iron Fish, and Red Rory. During adventure strips' run in the regular issue, there were 85 different adventure strips.

| Strip title | Notes | Original artist | Start date | End date |
|---|---|---|---|---|
| Morgyn the Mighty | Originally appeared in The Rover in 1928. Later appeared in The Victor. | George Anderson | 1938 | 1938 |
| Cracker Jack | | Jack Glass | 1938 | 1939 |
| Wild Boy of the Woods | Three series. First from 1938 to 1942. Second from 1947 to 1949. Third in 1958. | Richard Baines | 1938 | 1958 |
| Lost Among the Silver Dwarfs | | James Walker | 1938 | 1940 |
| Young Strongarm the Axeman | Three series. First from 1939 to 1940. Second in 1949. Third from 1957 to 1958 titled just 'Strongarm the Axeman'. | Jack Glass | 1939 | 1940 |
| Tiger Trail to Kandabar | | James Walker | 1940 | 1940 |
| The Whistling Scythe | Sequel to the prose story entitled 'Follow the Secret Hand'. Reappeared as a prose story in 1949. | Jack Glass | 1940 | 1942 |
| Tom Thumb | Previously appeared as a prose story. Two separate runs of adventure strips. First ran from 1941 to 1949. The second ran from 1957 to 1958. Prose stories involving the character appeared between these two runs. | Dudley Watkins | 1941 | 1958 |
| Lone Wolf | | Dudley Watkins | 1942 | 1943 |
| The Shipwrecked Circus | | Dudley Watkins | 1943 | 1958 |
| Jimmy and his Magic Patch | Original run from 1944 to 1950. Reprinted from 1955 to 1959. | Dudley Watkins | 1944 | 1959 |
| Strang the Terrible | Previously appeared in Adventure in 1936. | Dudley Watkins | 1944 | 1945 |
| Six Brands for Bonnie Prince Charlie | | Dudley Watkins | 1945 | 1945 |
| Jack Flash | First ran from 1949 to 1951. Then from 1955 to 1958. | Dudley Watkins | 1949 | 1958 |
| The Invisible Giant | Unrelated to older prose story with same title. Two series. First in 1949 and a second in 1957. A prose story version also appeared from 1949 to 1950. | James Clark | 1949 | 1957 |
| Little Noah's Ark | Previously appeared as a prose story. | James Clark | 1949 | 1949 |
| Chingo the Fearless | | James Clark | 1949 | 1949 |
| The Horse that Jack Built | Originally ran from 1949 to 1950. Appeared again from 1950 to 1951 under the title Tick-Tock Tony. Appeared for a final time from 1954 to 1957. | Bill Holroyd | 1949 | 1957 |
| The Runaway Robinsons | | Fred Sturrock | 1949 | 1950 |
| Sinbad the Sailor | Two separate series. First in 1950. Second ran from 1958 to 1959. There was also a prose story involving the character that ran from 1951 to 1952. | Paddy Brennan | 1950 | 1950 |
| The Hungry Little Goodwins | Picture adaptation of earlier prose story The Hungry Goodwins. Features Dick Turpin as a main character. | Fred Sturrock | 1951 | 1951 |
| The Wily Ways of Simple Simon | Previously appeared as a prose story. | George Drysdale | 1951 | 1951 |
| The Iron Fish | Previously appeared as a prose story. | Bill Holroyd | 1951 | 1967 |
| Hawkeye Bravest of the Braves | | Richard Baines | 1951 | 1951 |
| Runaway Jack | | Bill Holroyd | 1952 | 1952 |
| Grip | | Richard Baines | 1952 | 1952 |
| Red Rory of the Eagles | Previously appeared as a prose story. | Paddy Brennan | 1952 | 1962 |
| Wildfire the Magic Horse | Sequel to prose story entitled 'Prince on the Flying Horse'. | Ken Hunter | 1952 | 1952 |
| Ali Ha Ha and the Potty Thieves | | Ken Hunter | 1952 | 1952 |
| Waifs of the Wild West | Unrelated to first Waifs of the Wild West. | Bill Holroyd | 1952 | 1952 |
| The Bird Boy | Previously appeared as a prose story. | Paddy Brennan | 1952 | 1956 |
| Nobby The Enchanted Bobby | | Bill Holroyd | 1952 | 1954 |
| Big Bazooka | About an ostrich who liked to play football. | Charles Grigg | 1952 | 1953 |
| General Jumbo | | Paddy Brennan | 1953 | 1975 |
| Get Rid of the Runaway Twins | | James Walker | 1954 | 1954 |
| Smarty Smokey | Previously appeared as a prose story. | James Clark | 1954 | 1954 |
| Hookey's Bust 'em Book | Original run from 1954 to 1955. Reappeared in 1958. | Charles Grigg | 1954 | 1958 |
| Longlegs the Desert Wild Boy | Two series. First from 1954 to 1955. Second from 1957 to 1959. | Paddy Brennan | 1954 | 1959 |
| Thunderflash | About a ram in the Rockies. | Ken Hunter | 1955 | 1955 |
| Jack of Clubs | Previously appeared as a prose story. | Michael Darling | 1955 | 1955 |
| On the Heels of the Hated Hooknose | | Bill Holroyd | 1955 | 1955 |
| Runaways with Turpin | | James Walker/John Nichol | 1955 | 1956 |
| Young Davy Crockett | | Paddy Brennan | 1956 | 1956 |
| Nik O' Lightning | | Michael Darling | 1956 | 1956 |
| The Wooden Horse | | Paddy Brennan | 1956 | 1957 |
| Tick-Tock Timothy | Picture Version of earlier prose story Tick-Tock Timothy. | John Nichol | 1956 | 1957 |
| The Vengeance of One-Eye | | Andy Hutton | 1957 | 1957 |
| Kilty Mactaggart | | Andy Hutton | 1957 | 1957 |
| Brannigan's Boy | | John Nichol | 1957 | 1957 |
| Thrill-a-Day Jill | | John Nichol | 1957 | 1957 |
| Runaways with Thunderbird | | John Nichol | 1957 | 1957 |
| Tough Duff | | Andy Hutton | 1957 | 1958 |
| Johnny Go Back! | | Albert Holroyd | 1958 | 1958 |
| Bristol Billy | | Victor Peon | 1958 | 1958 |
| Rattlesnake Ranch | | John Nichol | 1958 | 1958 |
| The Hogan Boy | | John Nichol | 1958 | 1958 |
| The Blinding Shield | | Victor Peon | 1958 | 1958 |
| Sparky's Space Helmet | | Albert Holroyd | 1958 | 1959 |
| Fox on the Run | | Albert Holroyd | 1958 | 1959 |
| Black Star | | John Nichol | 1959 | 1959 |
| The Vengeance of the Lost Crusader | | Victor Peon | 1959 | 1959 |
| Dick Turpin Special Investigator | | John Nichol | 1959 | 1959 |
| Smarty Smokey The Wee Black Dragon | Unrelated to other Smarty Smokey. | Victor Peon | 1959 | 1959 |
| The Danger Man | | Michael Darling | 1959 | 1962 |
| Bob on the Beat | | John Nichol | 1959 | 1959 |
| The Kangaroo Kid | Picture strip version of The Ape's Secret. | Andy Hutton | 1959 | 1959 |
| Mountain Boy | | Victor Peon | 1959 | 1960 |
| Pete of the Spitfires | Picture story version of prose story which appeared in The Magic Comic. | Michael Darling | 1959 | 1960 |
| Teeko | Picture strip version of Little Master of the Mighty Chang. | Andy Hutton | 1959 | 1960 |
| The Laughing Pirate | | Victor Peon | 1960 | 1960 |
| Danny on a Dolphin | Three series. First in 1960. Second in 1962 and third in 1968. | David Sutherland | 1960 | 1968 |
| The Queen's Highway | | Tery Patrick | 1960 | 1960 |
| The Ting-A-Ling Taylors | | Terry Patrick | 1960 | 1961 |
| The Great Flood of London | | David Sutherland | 1960 | 1961 |
| The Cannonball Crackshots | | David Sutherland | 1961 | 1961 |
| The Adventures of Johnny Leopard | | Michael Darling | 1961 | 1961 |
| Paddy's Private Army | Two Series. First appeared from 1961 to 1962. The second appeared in 1965. | James Walker | 1961 | 1965 |
| G for Giant | | Ken Hunter | 1962 | 1962 |
| Lester's Little Circus | | David Sutherland | 1962 | 1963 |
| The Q Bikes | | Andy Hutton | 1963 | 1971 |
| The Danger Bus | | Terry Patrick | 1963 | 1964 |
| Billy the Cat | Original run from 1967 to 1974. Reappeared in 2003, 2005 and again from 2008 to 2009. | David Sutherland | 1967 | 2009 |
| The King Street Cowboys | | Sandy Calder | 1968 | 1968 |
| Send for the Hovertank | | Sandy Calder | 1968 | 1969 |
| Johnny Hawke | About a boy who was able to communicate with birds. Similar to Red Rory of the Eagles. | Andy Hutton | 1973 | 1973 |

== Prose stories ==
From The Beano's first issue up until 1955, it contained prose stories. These were similar to other text stories found in older story papers and featured a prose story, usually of one or two pages (longer in the annuals), often featuring an illustration at the top of the page with the title of the prose story. A number of these prose stories went on to become adventure strips, and some adventure strips even had prose story versions.

During their lifetime in The Beano, there were 79 different prose stories, of which 15 also appeared as adventure strips: Jack of Clubs, Tom Thumb, Little Noah's Ark, The Iron Fish, Red Rory of the Eagles, Sinbad the Sailor, Little Master of the Mighty Chang, The Bird Boy, The Wily Ways of Simple Simon, The Invisible Giant, The Hungry Goodwins, Tick Tock Timothy, Smarty Smokey, Prince on the Flying Horse, and Follow the Secret Hand.

The issue following the 75th Anniversary Special in 2013 introduced a new text story called Diary of an Ugly Kid, but it disappeared later that year. In 2014, yet another new text story appeared titled Diary of a Bash Street Kid.

| Strip title | Notes | Original artist | Start date | End date |
|---|---|---|---|---|
| Tom Thumb | Tom Thumb also appeared in Bimbo. Two Prose series. First was from 1938 to 1941. Second was from 1949 to 1950. In between the character appeared in picture strips. | Dudley Watkins | 1938 | 1950 |
| Black Flash the Beaver | | Richard Baines | 1938 | 1938 |
| Granny Green | Originally ran from 1938 to 1939. Reprinted from 1945 to 1946. Returned again in 1951. | Charles Gordon | 1938 | 1951 |
| The Wishing Tree | Originally ran from 1938 to 1939. Reprinted in 1946. | Jack Glass | 1938 | 1946 |
| The Shipwrecked Kidds | | Jack Glass | 1938 | 1938 |
| My Dog Sandy | | Jack Glass | 1938 | 1938 |
| The Ape's Secret | | Richard Baines | 1938 | 1938 |
| Jimmy's Pet-The Kangaroo | | Richard Baines | 1938 | 1939 |
| The Prince on the Flying Horse | Originally ran from 1938 to 1940. Reprinted in 1947. | James Walker | 1938 | 1947 |
| Little Master of the Mighty Chang | | Jack Glass | 1938 | 1939 |
| The Little Magic Man | | George Ramsbottom | 1938 | 1939 |
| King of Thunder Mountain | | Richard Baines | 1939 | 1939 |
| The Singing Giant | | Richard Baines | 1939 | 1939 |
| Twelve Happy Horners | | George Ramsbottom | 1939 | 1939 |
| The Bulldog Trail | | Jack Glass | 1939 | 1939 |
| The Little Joker in the Land of Nod | Originally ran from 1939 to 1940. Partially reprinted in 1948 under the title 'Sammy B Smart in the Land of Nod'. | James Walker | 1939 | 1948 |
| Hands off the Talking Lamb | | James Walker | 1939 | 1939 |
| Jack Sprat's Battle Cat | Ran under the title 'When will the Golden Peacock Speak?' in 1940. | James walker | 1939 | 1940 |
| Follow the Secret Hand | Originally ran as a prose story from 1939 to 1940. Then as a picture strip with the title 'The Whistling Scythe'. A sequel story ran in 1949 entitled 'Keeper of the Magic Sword'. With another sequel appearing in 1950 entitled 'The Boy with the Wonder Horse'. | Dudley watkins | 1939 | 1950 |
| The Boy with the Magic Masks | Originally appeared in 1940. Reprinted in 1948. | Dudley Watkins | 1940 | 1948 |
| Keeper of the Crooked Cross | | George Ramsbottom | 1940 | 1940 |
| The King's got a Tail | | Dudley Watkins | 1940 | 1940 |
| Down with Lord Haw-Haw | | Jack Glass | 1940 | 1940 |
| The White Mouse will Get You | | Dudley Watkins | 1940 | 1942 |
| Little Noah's Ark | Two Prose series. First ran from 1940 to 1941. Second appeared in 1952. There was also a picture strip version in 1949. | Richard Baines | 1940 | 1952 |
| A Wonderful Bird is Bill Pelican | | Richard Baines | 1940 | 1940 |
| The Black Witch is Waiting | | George Ramsbottom | 1940 | 1947 |
| The March of the Wooden Soldiers | | Fred Sturrock | 1941 | 1941 |
| The Boy who bossed the Man in the Moon | | James Crighton | 1941 | 1941 |
| The Invisible Giant | | Jack Glass | 1941 | 1942 |
| Waifs of the Wild West | | George Ramsbottom | 1941 | 1941 |
| Blacksmith Bob eats Hay at Night | | James Crighton | 1941 | 1941 |
| Plucky Little Nell | Originally ran from 1941 to 1942. Reappeared in a slightly reworked form in 1952 as 'Plucky Little Nellie Kelly'. | Jack Prout | 1941 | 1952 |
| Nobody Wanted Nancy | | Jack Prout | 1942 | 1942 |
| Jack in the Bottle | Originally ran from 1942 to 1943. Reprinted from 1950 to 1951 under the title 'Bob in the Bottle'. | James Crighton | 1942 | 1951 |
| Jimmy's Mother Wouldn't Run Away | | Jack Gordon | 1942 | 1943 |
| The Goat with the Magic Wand | | James Crighton | 1943 | 1943 |
| The Girl with the Golden Voice | Originally appeared in 1943. Reprinted as 'In the Clutches of the Wicked Wilsons' from 1952 to 1953. | Jack Prout | 1943 | 1953 |
| Kitty with the coat of many colours | | James Crighton | 1943 | 1944 |
| King Kong Charlie | | Jack Gordon | 1944 | 1944 |
| Wun Tun Joe | | James Crighton | 1944 | 1944 |
| The Wicked Uncle and the Terrible Twins | | Jack Prout | 1944 | 1945 |
| Whitefang Guards the Secret Gold | | James Crighton | 1944 | 1945 |
| The Boy that Nobody Wanted | | Richard Baines | 1945 | 1945 |
| Tick-Tock Timothy | | Jack Prout | 1945 | 1946 |
| The Witch's Spell on Poor King Kell | | Jack Prout | 1946 | 1946 |
| Sooty Solomon | | Jack Prout | 1946 | 1947 |
| Ben O' the Beanstalk | | Jack Prout | 1946 | 1947 |
| The Runaway Russells | | Fred Sturrock | 1947 | 1948 |
| The Magic Penny | | Jack Prout | 1947 | 1948 |
| The Hungry Goodwins | Featured Dick Turpin as a main character. | Fred Sturrock | 1948 | 1949 |
| One-off Lucky Mascot Stories | | Fred Sturrock, Jack Gordon, Sam Fair & Jack Prout | 1948 | 1949 |
| The Iron Fish | Later appeared in a picture strip. | Jack Glass | 1949 | 1950 |
| Sandy's Magic Bagpipes | | Jack Glass | 1949 | 1950 |
| The Invisible Giant | Unrelated to 1941 story with the same name. Prose story adaptation of the adventure strip with the same name. | Fred Sturrock | 1949 | 1950 |
| Skinny Flint the Meanest Uncle in the World | | James Walker | 1949 | 1949 |
| The Ticklish Tasks of Billy Barrel | | George Drysdale | 1950 | 1950 |
| Ting-A-Ling Bell | | Jack Glass | 1950 | 1950 |
| The Wily Ways of Simple Simon | | George Drysdale | 1950 | 1950 |
| The Bird Boy | Later appeared in a picture strip. | Jack Glass | 1950 | 1951 |
| Tommy's Clockwork Town | Titled 'Tommy's Clockwork Brother' in 1952. | Billy Holroyd | 1951 | 1952 |
| Jack of Clubs | | Jack Glass | 1951 | 1951 |
| Smarty Smokey | | James Clark | 1951 | 1954 |
| Red Rory of the Eagles | Later appeared in a picture strip. | Jack Glass | 1951 | 1951 |
| Willie in the Lost World | | James Clark | 1951 | 1951 |
| Goggo The Wizard in the Goldfish Bowl | | David Law | 1951 | 1952 |
| Sinbad the Sailor | Prose story version of earlier Sinbad adventure strip. | Paddy Brennan | 1951 | 1952 |
| Rolling Jones | | James Clark | 1952 | 1952 |
| Mickey's Magic Bone | In 1954 ran under the title 'Slave to the Talking Horse'. | David Law | 1952 | 1954 |
| Young Robin Hood | | Jack Glass | 1952 | 1952 |
| TV Stevie The Boy on Hookey's Wrist | | George Drysdale | 1952 | 1952 |
| Catapult Jack | | Jack Glass | 1952 | 1952 |
| The Boy on the Flying Trapeze | | James Clark | 1952 | 1953 |
| Percy from the Pole Star | | James Crighton | 1953 | 1953 |
| Cast-Iron Stan Circus Superman | | Bill Holroyd | 1953 | 1953 |
| Nutty the Coal Imp | | Bill Holroyd | 1953 | 1954 |
| The Magic Bottle | | James Walker | 1953 | 1953 |
| Runaways with Grandad | | James Walker | 1953 | 1953 |
| The Spell of Geordie's Whistle | | James Walker | 1954 | 1955 |
| Ace from Space | | Leo Baxendale | 1955 | 1955 |
| Diary of an Ugly Kid | | Currently unknown | 2013 | 2013 |
| Diary of a Bash Street Kid | | Nigel Auchterlounie | 2014 | 2014 |

== Comic Idol runners-up ==
The following is a list of comic strips which appeared in The Beano during a Comic Idol or similar competition, but did not win. Many of these strips appeared in annuals. Even though these strips did not win a Comic Idol competition, many of them lasted longer than a number of other Beano comic strips such as Alf Wit, which only lasted two issues. In 2014, Comic Idol was called Beanotown's Got Talent.

Gordon Bennet went on to appear in The Beano a few years after coming runner-up in a Comic Idol competition. Phone-a-Fiend and Space Kidette are the only two strips on this list that appeared as one-offs.

| Strip title | Notes | Original artist | Start date | End date |
|---|---|---|---|---|
| Minder Bird | About a bird who had to look after a lively child called Terry the Terror. | Terry Willers | 1995 | 1995 |
| Sort Out Squad | Four kids, a cat and a parrot who would help people. | Robert Nixon | 1995 | 1995 |
| Chip – The Stone Age Boy | | John Dallas | 1995 | 1995 |
| Have-A-Go Jo | | David Mostyn | 1997 | 1997 |
| Camp Cosmos | About an inter-galactic holiday camp. Also appeared in one annual. | John Geering | 1997 | 1997 |
| SYDD (Sneaky, Yucky, Dump Dweller) | | David Mostyn | 1997 | 1997 |
| Trash Can Alley | | Bob Dewar | 1997 | 1997 |
| Inspector Horse and Jocky | About an inspector who was also a horse. and his human sidekick and Jockey called Jocky. Title was a play on Inspector Morse. | Terry Bave | 1999 | 2000 |
| Tricky Dicky | About a son of a joke shop owner who had plenty tricks up his sleeve. The strip's main character had previously appeared in The Topper. A re-creation of the strip saw a new Tricky Dicky appear in The Beano in 2013. | John Dallas | 1999 | 2000 |
| Gordon Bennet | About a little boy who would drive his next door neighbour mad. | Jim Hansen | 1999 | 2000 |
| Space Kidette | This strip was about an alien whose spacecraft crash-landed on Earth. Only two strips ever appeared and they were in the same issue. Its premise was similar to the later strip Zap Zodiac. | Robert Nixon | 2002 | 2002 |
| Phone-a-Fiend | About a group of monsters that were hired to scare troublemakers into changing their ways. A similar strip appeared in the 2011 Beano Annual entitled Fiends Reunited drawn by Nick Brennan. | Wayne Thompson | 2002 | 2002 |
| Dean's Dino | The character previously appeared as a regular comic strip in 1999. | Geoff Waterhouse | 2004 | 2004 |
| Christmas Carole | About a girl who wanted it to be Christmas every day. Previously appeared in The Beezer Book. | Keith Page | 2005 | 2005 |
| Hugh Dunnit | About a boy detective. | David Mostyn | 2005 | 2005 |
| Mia Starr | | Duncan Scott | 2006 | 2006 |
| Scammin' Sam | | Steve Horrocks | 2006 | 2006 |
| Uh Oh Si Co | About a boy who'd go berserk at the slightest negative comment. | Nigel Parkinson | 2010 | 2010 |
| Home Invasion | About aliens who invade Earth. | David Sutherland | 2010 | 2010 |
| Granny Theft Auto | About Grannies behaving badly. | Steve Beckett | 2014 | 2014 |
| Dangerous Dan | About a boy who is a spy. | Nigel Parkinson | 2011 | Present |

== See also ==
- The Beano
- List of Beano comic strips by annual
- The Dandy
- List of Dandy comic strips
- The Beezer
- List of Beezer comic strips
- List of Beezer and Topper comic strips
