= Comic Idol =

Comic Idol is a competition held in The Beano every few years. In it, three to six new strips (or old strips brought back), run as guest strips in The Beano for a few weeks, and the most popular, determined by votes, gets a sustained place in The Beano.

== Winners ==
- 1995: Vic Volcano (Robert Nixon/Trevor Metcalfe)
- 1997: Tim Traveller (Vic Neill)/Crazy for Daisy (Nick Brennan)
- 1999: The Three Bears (Mike Pearse)
- 2002: Freddie Fear (Dave Eastbury)
- 2004: Joe Jitsu (Wayne Thompson) /Colin the Vet (Duncan Scott)
- 2005: Zap Zodiac (Steve Horrocks)
- 2006: Nicky Nutjob (Kelly Dyson)
- 2010: Meebo and Zuky (Laura Howell)

== Losers ==
- 1995: S.O.S Squad (Robert Nixon) /Minder Bird (Terry Willers)
- 1997: Camp Cosmos (John Geering)/S.Y.D.D/Trash Can Alley/Have-a-go-Jo (John Geering, David Mostyn and Bob Dewar)
- 1999: Tricky Dicky (John Dallas)/Gordon Bennett (Jimmy Hansen)/Inspector Horse and Jocky (Terry Bave)
- 2002: Space Kidette (Robert Nixon)/Phone-a-Fiend (Wayne Thompson)
- 2004: Dean's Dino (Geoff Waterhouse)
- 2005: Hugh Dunnit (David Mostyn)/Christmas Carole (Keith Page)
- 2006: Scammin' Sam (Steve Horrocks)/Mia Starr (Duncan Scott)
- 2010: Home Invasion (David Sutherland)/Uh, Oh, Si Co! (Nigel Parkinson)
