= Hoot (comics) =

British comic magazine (1985–1986)

- Typical example of Hoot front page (Issue 26, 19 April 1986)

Publication information
- Publisher: D. C. Thomson & Co. Ltd
- Publication date: 26 October 1985 to 25 October 1986
- No. of issues: 53

Hoot was a British comic magazine that ran from (issues dates) 26 October 1985 to 25 October 1986, when it merged with The Dandy. Its cover price was 20p, represented by a stylized graphic depiction of a 20p coin. Throughout its run, it billed itself as "Britain's bubbling new comic!", a reference to the title masthead being made up of steam-billowing pipes (hence the title). The comic was the last new humour anthology comic from DC Thomson which mostly featured original characters.

== List of Hoot comic strips ==
Strips throughout its 53 issue run included. Listed in order of appearance. All numbers refer to issues of Hoot.

Strip Title	Artist	First Appearance	Last Appearance	Notes
Cuddles	Barrie Appleby	1	53	The cover star. Originally appeared in Nutty Joined another Dandy strip ("Dimples") and became "Cuddles and Dimples".
The Hoot Squad	Ken H. Harrison	1	53	Reprinted as The Riot Squad in The Beano in 2007
Wanta Job Bob	Steve Bright	1	53	
Polar Blair	Robert Nixon	1	52	Continued in The Dandy
Sam's Secret Diary	Jerry Swaffield	1	48	
L Plated Ella	Robert Nixon	1	53	
Dogsbody	John Geering	1	53	
Piggles	Barrie Appleby	1	53	Revised reprints of Piggles appeared in The Dandy for about half a year in 2004.
Snackula	David Mostyn	1	53	
Super Fran	Steve Bright	1	51	
Spotted Dick	Barrie Appleby/Jerry Swaffield/John Aldrich	1	52	Continued in The Dandy
Charli	Jim Petrie	5	53	
Harry and William	George Martin	50	53	Much of the jokes in this strip involved the two title characters being mistaken for Prince Harry and Prince William.
The Old Ones	Jerry Swaffield	50	50	Strip's title is a play on The Young Ones
Winston	Steve Bright	51	52	An identical-looking character under the name Jim appeared in a Wanta Job Bob strip in issue 8.
Space Cop	George Martin	53	53	

== List of Characters featured in Hoot mini-strips ==
The comic also featured short, four-frame strips featuring pre-existing DC Thomson characters, but few of these strips seemed to have been drawn by their "proper" artists, hence a rather odd-looking Lord Snooty. Below is a list of these four frame strips. These strips were drawn by George Martin and after Hoot's merger with The Dandy they reappeared in The Dandy (still drawn by George Martin) under the title Comic Cuts and this time featured more Dandy characters than in Hoot.

Strip Title	Original Comic	First Appearance	Last Appearance	Notes
Big Uggy	The Topper	1	53	
Tarzan Stripes		1	50	Also appeared as a half page comic strip.
Flip 'n Flop		31	52	
Dennis the Menace	The Beano	9	53	
Big Eggo	The Beano	40	53	
Desperate Dan	The Dandy	1	53	
The Bash Street Kids	The Beano	2	22	
Jay R	Nutty	2	51	
Colonel Blink	The Beezer	1	53	
The Three Bears	The Beano	2	30	
Foxy	The Topper	2	53	
Bananaman	Nutty	3	38	
Desert Island Dick	The Topper	3	51	
The Badd Lads	The Beezer	1	47	
Lord Snooty	The Beano	1	49	
Roger the Dodger	The Beano	22	50	
Julius Cheeser	The Topper	42	52	
Biffo the Bear	The Beano	40	40	
King Gussie	The Topper	42	53	

== See also ==
- List of DC Thomson Publications
