= Duncan Scott (comics) =

British comics artist (died 2021)

Duncan Scott (died 2021) was a comics artist. He had been working freelance since completing a degree in visual communication in 1999. He has drawn for numerous comics and magazines and his work has appeared in The Beano, The National times, Blue Peter magazine, Disney Explorer magazine, BBC's Learning Is Fun magazine, BeanoMAX, The Dandy and Comic Football.

His first artwork for The Beano included illustrations for the Rhyme Time sections (Taking over from Chris McGhie) which was a regular feature in The Beano during the first half of the 2000s, which saw readers send in rhymes. From 2001 he drew "Stripz" for The Beano which were usually a small single panel gag which featured in the comic occasionally filling half a page or more often as a gag at the bottom of a full page strip. His first regular full strip, Colin the Vet, appeared in The Beano in 2004. It came in second place in that year's Comic Idol competition but entered the comic anyway after only losing by one percent. He also drew The Neds starting from 2005. This strip was irregular but it was also featured in BeanoMAX. He also drew Mia Starr for The Beano but this strip lost the 2006 Comic Idol competition and unlike Colin the Vet, it did not become a regular strip in the comic.

He also did the artwork for a number of strips in the Dandy including Count Snotula and Brain Duane.

In addition to illustrating, he occasionally wrote comics. He wrote a number of scripts for Harry Hill's Adventures in TV Land which were drawn by Nigel Parkinson.

Duncan died in March 2021.

== Bibliography ==
=== The Dandy ===
- Doctor Loo
- Animals Eat The Funniest Things
- 101 Ways To Use A Meerkat
- Brain Duane
- Adult Code
- Olympigs
- Count Snotula

=== The Beano ===
- Stripz
- Colin the Vet
- The Neds
- Mia Starr
- The Space between Smiffy's Ears
