= Sweet Tooth (comics) =

British comic strip by Trevor Metcalfe

Sweet Tooth was a British comic strip, created by Trevor Metcalfe in January 1973 and first published in the magazine Whizzer and Chips. When the magazine merged with Buster in 1990 the series continued until the magazine was disestablished in 2000.

== Concept ==
The comic centers around a boy, Sweet Tooth, who enjoys eating sweets so much that he has only one tooth left. He is frequently bullied by another boy, Bully Bloggs (Greedy Greg in later stories), who often steals his sweets away. Sweet Tooth always manages to get his humorous revenge in the end.

Though other artists, including Vic Neill, drew strips from time to time, Trevor Metcalfe was the main artist throughout. Jack Edward Oliver included Sweet Tooth on the last page of the final issue of Buster in January 2000, explaining that Sweet Tooth's "sweet tooth" eventually went bad from all the sweet eating.
