= Markes =

Markes is a surname. Notable people with the surname include:

- Julie Markes, American writer
- Larry Markes (1921–1999), American comedian, singer, and screenwriter
- Ronny Markes (born 1988), Brazilian mixed martial artist

== See also ==
- Markes, Pennsylvania
