= David Parkins =

British cartoonist and illustrator

- Born: 2 November 1955 (age 71) Brighton, England
- Area: Cartoonist

David Alan Parkins (born 2 November 1955) is a British cartoonist and illustrator who has worked for D.C. Thomson, publisher of The Beano and The Dandy. Now based in Canada, he illustrates children's picture books.

Parkins was born in Brighton, but moved to Grantham, Lincolnshire at the age of five. He didn't take up art until sixth form, when he also began drawing caricatures of his teachers. He studied Wildlife Illustration at Dyfed College of Art for a year, before switching to graphic design at Lincoln College of Art, specialising in illustration. Graduating in 1979, he became a freelance illustrator, working on postcards, school textbooks, newspapers and magazines as well as comics.

Parkins's first work for The Beano was on "Billy Whizz" in 1989. He quickly made his mark on the strip and the character, and made several changes, the most notable of these being the introduction of Billy's new lightning bolt tracksuit in May 1992.

In 1990, he started to draw "Fred's Bed" in The Beezer as understudy to Tom Paterson, although in practice Parkins drew the vast majority of strips. He drew the strip until it was forced to end when the comic folded. In 1993, he stopped drawing Billy Whizz, but Trevor Metcalfe and Vic Neill had been drawing a number of the strips for some time. By this point he was drawing "Desperate Dan" for the Dandy, along with a revival of another Beano strip, "The Three Bears". Parkins's version of the latter strip was later cited by former Beano editor Euan Kerr as one of his personal favourites.

After the Beano's 60th birthday celebrations in 1998, Parkins took over the comic's long-running character "Dennis the Menace". His first Dennis strips featured the story arc which introduced Bea, Dennis's younger sister. He drew Dennis on a regular basis until 2003, but his workload meant that a number of stories were also drawn by Nigel Parkinson and later Jimmy Hansen in this time. Parkins's time on Dennis encompassed the character's 50th birthday celebrations in 2001, and to mark the occasion he drew a special one-off Dennis strip explaining how he got his famous red and black striped jumper.

David Parkins was also the artist of Desperate Dan for The Digital Dandy in 2013.

Parkins has also illustrated two of Richard Platt's books in the Pirate Diary series.

He has illustrated over fifty children's books, including titles by Dick King-Smith, Julie Markes, Laura Leuck and Martin Waddell. He has drawn cartoons for The Guardian, The Observer, The Sunday Times, the Times Higher Education Supplement, The Economist, the Literary Review of Canada, and Nature. In 2006, after his fiftieth birthday, he emigrated to Ontario, Canada. In 2013, he became an occasional editorial cartoonist for The Globe and Mail.

David Parkins is also the illustrator of That Cat Can't Stay and I Always, ALWAYS Get My Way, both written by Thad Krasnesky and published by Flashlight Press.
