= Barrie Appleby =

British comics artist

Barrie Appleby (born August 8, 1943) is a British comics artist who works mainly for Scottish publisher D. C. Thomson & Co., drawing strips such as Dennis the Menace and Roger the Dodger for The Beano since the 1970s. He has also drawn Cuddles and Dimples for The Dandy, as well as strips for Nutty, Hoot, Monster Fun and Buster. He also drew Bananaman in the BEEB comic. In 1999, he took over Bananaman in the Dandy from John Geering. He returned for a short time to do Bananaman in 2008.

In 2003, he took over Roger the Dodger after the death of Robert Nixon. Appleby's Roger strips were similar in style to Nixon's, although his own style was always evident. However, following the Dandy's revamp in October 2004, he relinquished Cuddle Dimples to Nigel Parkinson. A couple of years later, he drew two new strips for the Beano, with Pirates of the Caribeano beginning in September 2006 and London B412 following in October 2007, both were short-lived. He also provided the cover illustrations for the 2008 and 2009 editions of the Beano Annual. In February 2011, Appleby became the full-time Dennis the Menace artist, and he stopped drawing Roger shortly afterwards.

Barrie Appleby returned to draw new Roger the Dodger episodes in August 2012 after Nigel Parkinson took over as Dennis artist. He supposedly left in The Beano in July 2013 along with Barry Glennard and Dave Eastbury when Roger was taken over by Jamie Smart. In early 2014, Barrie returned to The Beano to draw Gnasher and Gnipper And returned to Roger the Dodger in July.
