= Shhhhh! Everybody's Sleeping =

Shhhhh! Everybody's Sleeping is a 2004 children's book written by Julie Markes and illustrated by David Parkins. It was published by HarperCollins (ISBN 0060537906).

The book was selected by School Library Journal as a Best Book of 2005. It was also named one of Scholastic's "Best Before-Bed Read-Alouds".

Listed by both Renaissance Learning and Accelerated Reader, who have created quizzes for the book, it's also been listed as suggested reading by several elementary schools.

== Awards and recognition ==
- A SLJ Best Book of 2005.
- One of Scholastic's "Best Before-Bed Read-Alouds".

== Plot ==
Shhhhh! Everybody's Sleeping is a bedtime story that discusses fictional bedtimes for people of different professions (farmer, baker, etc.).
