= Baroness Morris =

Baroness Morris may refer to:

- Patricia Morris, Baroness Morris of Bolton (b. 1953), British Conservative politician and member of the House of Lords
- Estelle Morris, Baroness Morris of Yardley (b. 1952), British Labour politician and member of the House of Lords
