= Wee Ben Nevis =

British comic strip

Wee Ben Nevis was a British gag-a-day comic, published in the comic book magazine The Beano, first appearing in issue 1678, dated 14 September 1974, and continuing until 7 May 1977. It was drawn by Vic Neill, and replaced The McTickles, another Scottish themed strip by the same artist.

== Concept ==
Wee Ben Nevis was a fictional Scottish Highlands boy of superhuman strength. In the first storyline, Wee Ben is sent by his father (Big Ben Nevis) to Pudding College in England. On arriving, he meets the headmaster Prof. Egwell Fryd, who instructs him to "tidy up the classroom". Unfortunately, Wee Ben's idea of "tidying up" involves stuffing all the other students into cupboards. For the next few years, he brought chaos to staff and students alike. Much of the humour stemmed from the fact that Wee Ben never realised (or at least never anticipated) his own strength.

His name is a pun on the Scottish mountain Ben Nevis.

Auberon Waugh described the feature as having "strong undertones of Scottish Nationalism by its untrue suggestion that Scotsmen have superhuman strength despite their diminutive stature".
