= Vic Neill =

British cartoonist

Vic Neill (24 November 1941 – 24 December 1999) was a British cartoonist who drew for D.C. Thomson and I.P.C.'s comics. His first notable comic work was on Sparky strip Peter Piper. In 1969, he replaced Dudley Dexter Watkins on Topper cover star Mickey the Monkey after Watkins' sudden death. Neill was a big admirer of Watkins' artwork. He made his debut in the Beano with The McTickles in 1971. In 1974, this was replaced by another Scottish-themed strip, Wee Ben Nevis.

In 1977, when D.C. Thomson launched their new comic, Plug, a spin-off from The Bash Street Kids, Neill became the regular artist of the title character's strip, which he continued to draw after it merged with The Beezer two years later. In the 1980s, Neill drew much material for I.P.C. Magazines. This included strips such as Top of the Class in Buster comic and Spare-Part Kit in Whoopee. His final strip for them, Nightmare on Erm Street, appeared in Buster in 1990.

Returning to the Beano in the late 1980s, he took over The Germs from David Sutherland. Neill then started drawing Billy Whizz in 1992, and became the strip's regular artist the following year when the Beano switched to full-colour printing. While initially drawing the character in a loosely comparable style to David Parkins and Trevor Metcalfe when they shared the workload, once he was established as main artist he began making incremental changes to Billy's appearance. Most notably, Billy had always had two long hairs on the top of his head, but in the 9 July 1994 issue of the comic his hair fused into a lightning flash, and his head shape was also changed from oval to round. In the Beano's 1997 reader vote, Neill drew Tim Traveller, the boy with the time-travelling bike. Tim won the poll, along with Crazy for Daisy and went on to become a regular in the comic.

He continued drawing for the Beano until his death in December 1999. Billy Whizz was taken over by Graeme Hall, with Keith Reynolds becoming his replacement on Tim Traveller, but The Germs ended. A number of his Billy Whizz strips were later reprinted in the Beano in 2008–2009.
