= The Yeti with Betty =

British comic strip

- Comic strip character(s) from The Beano
- No image available

Publication information
- Stars in: The Yeti with Betty
- Other names: Betty and the Yeti
- Creator(s): Robert Nixon
- Other contributors: Steve Beckett
- Current/last artist: Hugh Raine
- First appearance: Issue 2633 (2 January 1993)
- Also appeared in: The Beano Annual
- Current status: Ongoing
- Schedule: Weekly

Characters
- Regular characters: Betty, The Yeti

The Yeti with Betty (now known as Betty and the Yeti) is a comic strip in the UK comic The Beano, first appearing in issue 2633, dated 2 January 1993, and drawn originally by Robert Nixon.

== Concept ==
Sick of the cold weather and lack of company, a talking yeti flees the Himalaya by grabbing onto the wheel of a passing aeroplane, landing in the white cliffs of Dover. While there, he meets a young girl called Betty, who befriends the yeti and adopts it as her pet. The subsequent strips followed the adventures of the yeti as he tried to adjust to city life.

Appearing in the comic throughout the year, the strip last appeared in issue 2698, dated 2 April 1994. However, the strip appeared in the 1995 Beano Annual.

== Revival ==
The strip was revived in issue 3784, dated 16 May 2015, now retitled Betty and the Yeti. This half-page version was drawn by Steve Beckett, and showed the Yeti befriending Betty over a comic at a campsite. He then stowed away in the luggage on the car roof as Betty and her father drove back to Beanotown. The Yeti himself looked identical to Robert Nixon's version, but Betty and her family were completely redesigned.

In March 2016, the strip was redesigned and written by Hugh Raine, rendered with a loose, pencil line and a cuter character style. The first collection of Betty and the Yeti strips was published in April 2025, with volume 2 being released in August 2025.
