= Bill Holroyd =

British investor and philanthropist (born 1953)

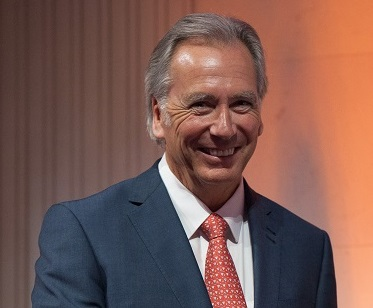
William Holroyd in 2015

Charles William Holroyd CBE DL (born 7 February 1953) is a British investor and philanthropist. He founded the youth charity OnSide Youth Zones in 2008 and was appointed CBE in the 2012 New Year Honours for services to young people and to the community in the North West.

== Career ==
Holroyd joined Forte's group supply division where he stayed for eight years, setting up and running their national distribution network.

In 1982, he left to set up his own foodservice distribution company, Holroyd Meek. By 1994, the company had a turnover of £190m serving over 7,000 restaurants across the UK. In 1995, Booker acquired the company and Holroyd started his own investment company.

Between 1995 and 2015, he invested in over 25 start-up and second-stage companies.

== Philanthropy ==
Holroyd was chairman of Bolton Lads and Girls Club, and has said that the club's effect on young people in the area prompted him to try to replicate it elsewhere.

In 2008, Holroyd set up OnSide Youth Zones, a charity providing safe, state-of-the-art facilities for young people in their leisure time. As of 2016 eight Youth Zones were complete with fourteen in process. Over 30,000 young people were regular users of the Youth Zones.

In 2013, he was appointed CBE for his charitable works.

Bill and Julie Holroyd set up The Holroyd Foundation in 2014. The foundation seeks to promote health, welfare, education and opportunity with particular emphasis on young people. The foundation makes donations to charities associated with young people, cancer associated charities and many local charities in Cheshire.

In 2015, he had the privilege of fulfilling the role of the High Sheriff of Cheshire and the honour of a Beacon Fellowship for Philanthropy.

He was Chairman of Bolton Lads and Girls Club and Committee Member of the Duke of Edinburgh Award Scheme.

== Awards ==
- Deputy Lieutenant since 2008
- CBE 2013
- High Sheriff of Cheshire 2015
- Beacon Fellowship Award for Philanthropy 2015

== Personal life ==
Bill is married to Julie. They live in Cheshire with their children, Olivia and Harrison. Bill has two older children Laura and Nicholas and two grandchildren.
