= Nick Brennan =

British cartoonist

Nick Brennan is a British cartoonist who works mainly for D. C. Thomson & Co. Ltd. He started drawing for the company in 1993 in collaboration with his wife, Fran Brennan, who is the colourist for Nick's artwork. Initially Nick drew a revival of Peter Piper from The Dandy, revived from The Magic Comic, but with a departure from Watkins' creation, with Peter instead sporting an Elvis-like hairdo and purple jumper.

January 1994 saw his next work Blinky, a revamp of the nephew of Colonel Blink from The Beezer who had first appeared in the merged Beezer and Topper in 1990.

In 1997, Nick drew a comic strip for a vote for The Beano which was called "Crazy for Daisy", and, along with Tim Traveller by Vic Neill, won the vote, followed by another strip, Pinky's Crackpot Circus, in 2004, and in 2006, a revival of "Brassneck" and "Noah's Ark". These last three are all from The Dandy. He also drew Sneaker for The Dandy plus a number of other less well-known characters such as Frawg. In the 2000s, Nick occasionally ghosted Nicky Nutjob, and contributed to the Fun Size Dandy/Fun Size Beano comics. In addition, he was the artist for Billy Whizz in the Beano from autumn 2009 until 2012.

Nick Brennan appeared a few times in The Dandy after its October 2010 revamp drawing Watch this Space and Professor Cheese's Olympic Wheezes. Reprints of Blinky, Pinky's Crackpot Circus, Brassneck and Sneaker were also used during 2012. In the final print edition of The Dandy, Nick drew Blinky, Peter Piper and Pinky's Crackpot Circus. A reprint of one of Nick's Hyde and Shriek strips was also used.

In the relaunched Digital Dandy, Nick produced Blinky and Sneaker with both stories being animated by his wife, Fran.

Nick's work appears in the Dandy Annual each year, with his newer characters, 'The Wrestlers', featuring in more recent editions.

Since late 2025 Nick has drawn Calamity James 'the unluckiest boy in the world' for the Beano, with the first of these weekly strips appearing in mid January 2026 (issue no.4319). Nick's Calamity James is also due to appear in this year's release of the Beano Annual.

His work also includes Beano comic character, Stevie Star, and cartoon illustrations and animations for Beano Studios and the Beano for Schools projects featuring Dennis the Menace, Gnasher, Minnie the Minx and a host of other Beano faves.

In addition to comic work, Nick undertakes private and commercial commissions and has run cartoon workshops for events such as The Art of Stories at the Eden Project.

In collaboration with Fran, Nick also creates occasional fun and immersive/interactive three-dimensional digital cartoon dioramas, which can be experienced in WebXR, AR and VR.
