= Richard Baines =

Elizabethan double agent

Richard Baines (fl. 1568–1593) was an English Catholic priest and double agent of the Elizabethan era. He is best known for the "Baines Note", a list of accusations against the poet and playwright Christopher Marlowe.

== Early life and education ==
It is unknown where and when Baines was born. He matriculated in November 1568 as a pensioner at Christ's College, Cambridge. Another Richard Baines, favoured by earlier biographers, was at Oxford, but Roy Kendall argues the one at Cambridge to be the Baines connected to Marlowe. He gained his Bachelor of Arts degree in 1573, commencing his Master of Arts degree at Caius College, Cambridge in 1576.

== Double agent ==
The English College at Rheims in France was a Catholic seminary at which English Catholics studied for the priesthood, with the aim of returning covertly to England to provide Catholic clergy for those who still adhered to the "old religion" in what was now a Protestant country. Some would support action to return England to the Catholic faith, even if this entailed the assassination of its Protestant Queen, Elizabeth I.

On 4 July 1579 Baines arrived at Rheims, being ordained a sub-deacon three years later on 25 March 1581, a deacon on 8 May, and a priest on 21 September that year. On 4 October 1581 he celebrated his first Mass as a priest.

Unfortunately for him, however, he confided to a fellow-seminarist his rejection of the Catholic faith and his plans to return to England to report to the queen's spymaster Sir Francis Walsingham about the various plots being hatched in Rheims. In May 1582 he was imprisoned in Rheims town gaol, but a year later was back at the seminary, still a prisoner, where he wrote a lengthy confession of his offences. It seems quite likely that he had in fact been an agent of Sir Francis Walsingham all along.

== Flushing ==
Walsingham died in 1590, and Baines was next heard of in early 1592, when he was in Flushing, at that time an English possession in the Netherlands, apparently sharing a room with Christopher Marlowe. According to a letter sent by the Governor, Sir Robert Sidney, to the Lord Treasurer, Lord Burghley, Baines accused Marlowe of having been involved in the counterfeiting of coins. Only one of these—a Dutch shilling made of pewter—had been put into circulation ('uttered'), but some pieces of "Her Majesty's coin" had also been counterfeited, and this made it petty treason, a capital offence. Marlowe was sent back under guard to face Lord Burghley, but seems to have been released almost immediately, suggesting that whatever he was doing was on behalf of Burghley, and that Baines was unaware of this. Whether Baines was there on behalf of some rival faction of the Privy Council is a possibility, but at the moment unknowable.

== The Baines Note ==
A year later, in May 1593, it seems that Baines was instrumental in getting the playwright Thomas Kyd wrongly accused of an offence for which he was imprisoned and tortured and shortly after this Baines was called upon, apparently by the Lord Keeper, Lord Puckering, to provide an account of what he knew of the heretical views of Christopher Marlowe. Seemingly relishing the task, he produced the so-called Baines Note which, with some amendment by Puckering, was sent to the Queen. Before any action could be taken against Marlowe, however, an inquest reported him dead, stabbed in self-defence by Ingram Frizer—a man with whom he had been dining—in a dispute over payment of the bill or "reckoning". A majority of Marlowe's more recent biographers have nevertheless expressed doubts about whether the inquest jury's finding was what really happened.

== Vicar or thief? ==
It had been thought of in the past that a Richard Baines who finished up as a vicar in Waltham, Lincolnshire, might have been the one described as Marlowe's nemesis. Roy Kendall, however, has persuasively argued that he was framed for a capital crime the following year by an unnamed man with whom he went drinking, a crime about which a ballad was even written. The details of the cup-stealing scene in Doctor Faustus between "Dick" and "Robin" in fact seem so similar to those of the Baines case that it may well have been an addition made after 1594, in December of which year this Richard Baines was hanged at Tyburn.
