= Patricia Morris, Baroness Morris of Bolton =

British peer (born 1953)

The Right Honourable The Baroness Morris of Bolton OBE DL
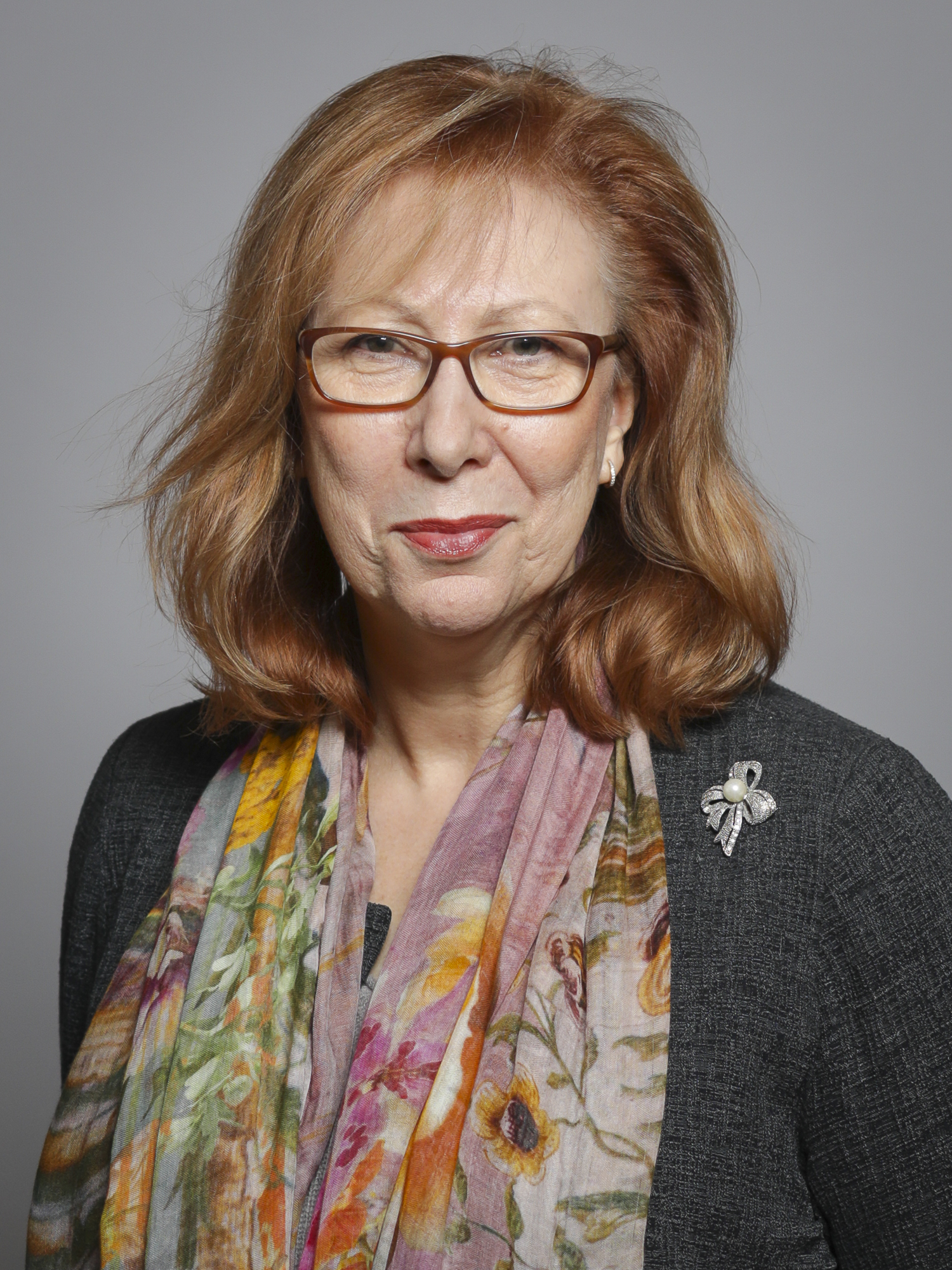

Deputy Speaker of the House of Lords
- Incumbent
- Assumed office 29 November 2010

Chancellor of the University of Bolton
- In office 1 January 2010 – 1 January 2014
- Preceded by: position established
- Succeeded by: Sir Ernest Ryder

Member of the House of Lords
- Lord Temporal
- Life peerage 9 June 2004

Personal details
- Born: 16 January 1953 (age 73)
- Party: Conservative

Patricia Morris, Baroness Morris of Bolton (born 16 January 1953), is a British peer and former Shadow Minister for Women and an Opposition Whip for the Conservative Party.

Morris was made a life peer in 2004, and has previously been Vice-Chairman of the Conservatives with responsibility for candidates. She was Chancellor of the University of Bolton.

== Political career ==
Prior to entering the House of Lords, Trish Morris was Vice-Chairman of the Conservative Party with responsibility for candidates. She was responsible for several changes in the selection procedure designed to increase the quality and diversity of Parliamentary candidates.

She was nominated for a peerage by the then Conservative leader, Iain Duncan Smith, and entered the House of Lords as Baroness Morris of Bolton in June 2004. She joined the Conservative front bench as a Whip in September of that year. In June 2005 she was appointed Shadow Minister for Children, Young People, Families and Women and in October 2006 became principal opposition spokesman for Education & Skills. Morris relinquished her role as Shadow Minister for Children, Schools & Families at the end of 2008, but remained Shadow Minister for Women and an Opposition Whip.

In November 2009 she featured in the controversy over the selection of Liz Truss as prospective parliamentary candidate for South West Norfolk. Truss had faced criticism for allegedly not disclosing to the selection committee a past affair with a married MP. Morris was quoted supporting her, saying "Liz is a first class candidate", and saying of the affair that "In this day and age that shouldn't matter".

== Personal life and voluntary work ==
Morris lives in Bolton. Her husband William is a judge. In her maiden speech in the House of Lords she revealed that she broke her back in a riding accident when she was a teenager.

She is President of the National Benevolent Institution and a trustee of The Disability Partnership and The Transformation Trust. She is a school governor and trustee of Bolton School which she attended as a child; a patron of the Oxford Parent Infant Project and vice-chairman of the All Party Parliamentary Group for Breast Cancer and Children. She is co-chair of Women in Public Policy and on the executive committee of the Association of Governing Bodies of Independent Schools.

Morris was a member of the Advisory Committee to the Abbot of Ampleforth Abbey from 1998 to 2004, served as deputy chairman of the Salford Royal hospital NHS foundation trust, and as a director of Bolton Lads and Girls Club and was a member of the Conservative Party's Social Work Commission. She joined the Board of Trustees of UNICEF UK in 2007. She succeeded Lord Patten as President of Medical Aid for Palestinians after he had resigned the post in June 2011 upon becoming Chairman of the BBC Trust.

On 27 November 2009 Morris was appointed as the first Chancellor of the University of Bolton, with a three-year term of office beginning on 1 January 2010.

Academic offices
Preceded by New position	Chancellor of the University of Bolton; 2010–2014	Succeeded by Ernest Ryder
