= Roland Davies =

Roland Oxford Davies (23 July 1904 – 10 December 1993) was a graphic artist who produced comics and animated film. The range of his work included a variety of cartoons: sports, topical, and strip cartoons. He also produced animated cartoons, and provided material for children's books and boys' weeklies. Later in life he also became a painter.

Davies was born in Stourbridge. His father was a conductor of theatre orchestras who encouraged Roland's interest in art. The family moved to Ipswich where Roland attended the Ipswich School of Art. After serving an apprenticeship as a lithographer, Roland started freelancing for such magazines as The Autocar and The Motor Cycle. However, when The Modern Boy was launched in 1928 he received regular work providing illustrations for covers and adventure stories.

Davies established the Roland Davies Cartoon Film Company Limited, which was dissolved in 1939.
