= Grandpa (comics) =

British comic strip, 1955 – c. 2014

- Character from The Beano

Publication information
- Star of: Grandpa (1955–57, 1971–84)
- First appearance: Issue 608; (30 July 1955)
- Last appearance: Issue ????; (c. 2014)
- Appearance timeline: Issues 608 – 798, 1522 – 2200, ?? – ??
- Author(s): Uncredited
- Illustrator(s): Ken Reid (1955–1957); Robert Nixon and Jimmy Glen (1971–1984); Steve Beckett

In-universe information
- Full name: Grandpa
- Family: His father

Grandpa was a British comic strip which originally appeared in the magazine The Beano from 1955 to 1957, drawn by Ken Reid. It was later revived from 1971 until 1984, but this time by Robert Nixon and afterwards Jimmy Glen.

== Background ==
Grandpa was first published in issue 680, illustrated by Ken Reid. It was a gag-a-day comic about a mischievous old bearded man.

Some of the stories involved his dad, an even older man with an even longer beard than him. Despite their advanced ages, they enjoyed a father-son relationship similar to that of Dennis the Menace and his dad; a typical story would be about Grandpa getting involved in some kind of mischief, being caught by his father and ending up getting a spanking. In a June 1956 strip, Grandpa was revealed to have been born in 1874, making his age 82. In 1957 the series was terminated.

From 1971 until 1984 Grandpa was relaunched. Robert Nixon drew it for the first years, after which Jimmy Glen took over until 1984. This series ran from issue 1522 to issue 2200.

Recently in The Beano, Grandpa briefly in "Funsize Funnies", illustrated by Steve Beckett.
