= Jack Glass =

British preacher (1936–2004)

John Thomas Atkinson Glass (8 September 1936 – 24 February 2004), often known as Pastor Jack Glass or simply as Jack Glass, was a Scottish Protestant preacher, evangelist and political activist. Glass is most readily associated with his strong views on unionism in Northern Ireland, his anti-Catholic speeches and his association with his friend and colleague Ian Paisley. According to his obituary in The Times, Glass was seen as Scotland's answer to Ian Paisley.

== Early life ==
Jack Glass was born in Dalmarnock, Glasgow, on 8 September 1936. His father, Samuel, was a brushmaker and Church of Scotland elder, while his mother, Isabella, was a housewife. He was the dux of his local Springfield school, which gave him an automatic scholarship to the local authority maintained but fee-paying Allan Glen's School in Glasgow. He turned the scholarship down because he did not want to be separated from his local friends. He attended Riverside Senior Secondary instead.

Glass was "born again" at the age of 11 in a Salvation Army Sunday School. These events shaped the rest of his life.

He married Margaret (Peggy) in 1958 at the age of 21; the couple had three children.

== Religion ==
In his early twenties, Glass collapsed in Jamaica Street, Glasgow, due to the erosion of a blood vessel. While lying in hospital recovering he felt a call to the ministry. He was ordained to the ministry in 1968 after studying moral philosophy and English at the University of Glasgow, plus a three-year theological course in the Free Church College in Edinburgh. There, he obtained a college diploma for his "proficiency in the subjects required". During his studies he was awarded with a distinction in homiletics and firsts in the subjects of Greek and Hebrew. Previous to this, Glass had left the Baptist Union College due to what he felt were its non-scriptural ecumenical involvements.

== Zion Baptist Church ==
Glass went on to minister at Zion Sovereign Grace Baptist Church, the church he had founded in 1965. The church is Calvinistic, Baptist and Separatist. The church met first at Edrom St. in Shettleston, followed by a spell at the Woodside Halls and then on to the current premises in Polmadie, Glasgow.

He was the editor of the Scottish Protestant View, an evangelical Protestant newspaper started by him in 1969. He was also Chairman of the Twentieth Century Reformation Movement which was reported as being considered by him to be the 'political arm' of his church.

== Anti-Catholicism, Unionism, Ian Paisley and politics ==
In following years he was to become well known for his protests against ecumenism and Roman Catholicism. These protests took him all over the world, including Italy, Sweden, Switzerland, Kenya, Canada and throughout the UK.

This culminated in a series of protests against the Papal visit to Britain in 1982, the first time a reigning Pope had set foot on the nominally Protestant island. For added publicity, Glass had put himself up as a candidate in the Glasgow Hillhead by-election on 25 March 1982. Under the description 'Protestant Crusade against the Papal Visit' he got 388 votes. Glass had stood for Parliament before; having been a candidate in the Glasgow Bridgeton constituency, a safe Labour seat, at the 1970 general election. Standing as an Independent Protestant, he received 1,180 votes (6.7% of the poll).

On 1 June 1982, Glass and Ian Paisley jointly led a protest march through Glasgow which culminated in a demonstration near the landing site of the Papal helicopter in Bellahouston Park. Glass and Paisley are said to have led the crowd in shouts of "The Beast is Coming", "No Surrender" and "Down with the Pope of Rome". Alongside this, Glass had debated at many Scottish and English universities, including Durham and Cambridge. He was recognized as a Biblical literalist.

Glass protested against ecumenism and, as he perceived it, the sins of an increasingly ungodly generation. He regularly preached four sermons a week.

He campaigned against perceived blasphemy on many occasions. He protested against films (The Last Temptation of Christ), plays (Corpus Christi), and comedians (notably Billy Connolly's crucifixion skit). When protests by Glass led to an increase in ticket sales for the Glasgow performance of the comic stage version of The Bible by the Reduced Shakespeare Company, the company announced they would like to offer Glass a free ticket as thanks.

Glass often joined Paisley in his protests against Irish Republicanism and against the Irish Republican Army and papal authority in Northern Ireland. Paisley however once noted that Jack Glass was "a bit of an extremist".

== Death ==
In January 2003, he was diagnosed with lung cancer. He publicly proclaimed that this was a personal attack by the devil himself. Throughout his intense treatment of chemotherapy and radiotherapy, he continued to preach twice weekly, protesting and taking part in hours of filming with the BBC (they had requested to document his life). The documentary The Devil and Jack Glass was screened in January 2004. His last public statement was to say that through the power of prayer he had "beaten the cancer the devil had given him." He died on 24 February that year. He is buried in Killearn.

== In popular culture ==
- Pastor Jack Glass was portrayed by Scottish folk artist Dick Gaughan on the 2006 album Lucky For Some in the song "The Devil And Pastor Jack".
