= Barry Glennard =

British comics artist

Barry Glennard is a British comics artist who works mainly for Scottish publisher D. C. Thomson & Co. He has drawn a number of strips for The Beano over the years including Pansy Potter, The Beano Birds, Gnasher and Gnipper and The Numskulls. Only one of these four currently remains in The Beano that is The Numskulls which was drawn by Barry Glennard until July 2013. He has also drawn for Fleetway occasionally, drawing Nosey Parker, Bookworm, Watford Gapp and Mustapha Million sometimes.

He supposedly left in The Beano in July 2013 along with Barrie Appleby and Dave Eastbury when The Numskulls was taken over by Nigel Auchterlounie.
