= Thad Krasnesky =

American children's book author

Thad Krasnesky is an American author, poet, and playwright. He is most well-known for his award-winning children’s books.

He is a former intelligence officer and Arabic speaker with multiple deployments to Iraq and Afghanistan. He received his first MA from Columbia University in Organizational Psychology and received a second masters in Military Arts and Science from the Command and General Staff College at Fort Leavenworth, Kansas.

His first children's book, I Always, Always Get My Way (2009) is held in 465 libraries according to WorldCat. It has been translated into German as Ich mach, was ich will - ich bin doch noch klein! and into Chinese as 我才三岁嘛! / Wo cai san sui ma!

His second children's book, That Cat Can't Stay (2010) was recognized as a Smithsonian Notable Book for Children. According to WorldCat, the book is held in 661 libraries

His third book, “Pterodactyl Show and Tell,” was released in 2020. A release date for his fourth book has not yet been announced.

He is also currently seeking to produce his contemporary dramatic musical, “Babylon,” based on his combat experience in Iraq.

Additionally, he is a skeptical author of ghost stories. Fright to the Point was his first book of the paranormal, and was the first book of ghost stories that focused on ghosts of West Point. According to WorldCat, the book is held in five libraries

He currently resides in a large, 140 year old Victorian mansion that his wife has dubbed, The Krasnesky Manor for Wayward Cats.
