= Trevor Metcalfe =

British illustrator and comic book artist

- Born: 19 May 1939 (age 87) Brotton, England, United Kingdom
- Areas: Cartoonist, Penciller, Inker
- Notable works: Sweet Tooth, Billy Whizz, Growing Paynes and Keyhole Kate

Trevor Metcalfe (born May 1939 in Brotton, Yorkshire) is a British illustrator and comic book artist known for his comic strips in IPC Magazines comics such as Sweet Tooth and Junior Rotter in Whizzer and Chips.

Influences include Leo Baxendale, Reg Parlett and Walt Disney.

== Biography ==
Metcalfe became interested in drawing at age eight during a stay in hospital. His main influence being sports cartoonist Tom Webster. He first submitted work to his local newspaper alongside art school mate Robert Nixon. After his National Service he obtained work for DC Thomson drawing his own strip Babes and Bullies for The Dandy Annual.

In Whizzer and Chips, he drew for many years his most famous character Junior Rotter. The strip was about a boy called Junior Rotter (or J.R.) who is always scheming up plans which generally fail. The character is loosely based on the character of the same name from the television soap opera Dallas. His sister in the comic strip was called Sue Helen who, in contrast to her brother, was a decent, charming and helpful person. Being chalk-and-cheese characters meant that JR and Sue Helen's sibling rivalry extended into all-out conflict.

Sweet Tooth first appearing in January 1973. A "Whizz-Kid" in the comic, and about a boy who has a fixation for sweets, continually hounded by Greedy Greg (originally Bully Bloggs), A main feature of the comic was the prominent front tooth that the character always displayed. Though other artists drew strips from time to time, Metcalfe was the main artist throughout.

For The Beano, he understudied Billy Whizz for David Parkins in the early 1990s in his traditional style, and replaced Wayne Thompson on the same character between 2005 and 2007 using a graphics tablet, drawing in a style somewhere between his own and Thompson's. He has also briefly took over drawing Bob Nixon's strips such as Roger the Dodger and Ivy the Terrible, and drew several Les Pretend strips in 2004-2005.

He left DC Thomson in 2007, leaving Billy Whizz without an artist for two years, until Nick Brennan took over in October 2009.

In more recent years, he has done more serious illustrations. Work is now in TV licensed tie-in comics and magazines, he has gone entirely digital working with a Wacom tablet at his Apple Mac working on Thomas the Tank Engine art in Adobe Illustrator and coloured in Photoshop. He drew warring brothers strip Growing Paynes for the dandy in the 1990s.

He draws comics in Ronald McDonald & Friends Magazine.

In 2010, he began work on a charity-oriented iPhone game called Cent Hope, marking his first foray into creating graphics for smartphone games.

== Bibliography ==
Comics work includes:

- Ad Lad in Whoopee!
- The Amazing Three in Jackpot
- Angel's Proper Charlies in Jackpot
- Birdman and Chicken in Krazy
- Doughnut and Rusty in Monster Fun
- Sheerluck and Son in Whoopee!

== See also ==
- British comics
- Jack Edward Oliver
- Lew Stringer
- The Topper
