= Pansy Potter =

British comic strip character

- Character from The Beano

Publication information
- Star of: Pansy Potter, the Strong Man's Daughter (1938 – 1949, 1953, 1958); Pansy Potter in Wonderland (1949 – 1953); Pansy Potter (1989 – 1993)
- First appearance: Issue 21; (17 December 1938)
- Last appearance: Issue 3954; (25 July 2018)
- Appearance timeline: Issues 21 – 325, 369 – 652, 812 – 854, 2474 – 2640, 3666 – 3674, 3954
- Creator(s): Beano staff
- Author(s): Uncredited
- Illustrator(s): Hugh McNeill (1938–1944); Basil Blackaller (1944); Sam Fair (1944–1947); James Clark (1949–1955); Charles Grigg (1958); Gordon Bell (1958); Barry Glennard (1989–1993); Nigel Parkinson (2013); Kev F. Sutherland; Bill Hill; John Geering; Evi De Bono

Also appeared in
- Beano works: The Beano Annual 1940–1942, 1951–1956, 2013, 2019; The Magic-Beano Book 1943–1950; The Beano Summer Special 1988
- DC Thomson works: Beano Comic Library (issues 210, 248, 258, 279, 303, 326); Sparky (issues 2–24, 80–567); The Sparky Annual 1971, 1973, 1975, 1977

Pansy Potter is a British comic strip character from the magazine The Beano. She first appeared in Pansy Potter the Strong Man's Daughter issue 21 in 1938, and was first illustrated by Hugh McNeill.

== Character background ==
As The Beano was in its early stages of development, its creator R. D. Low published a newspaper advert in The Daily Telegraph asking for freelance artists to submit ideas for DC Thomson's new children's magazines. One was Manchester-born Hugh McNeill, who would illustrate Puffing Billy and Ping the Elastic Man. DC Thomson's collaborating process developed a comic strip about a strong girl named Bella under the title of "Biff Bang Bella", but would be changed shortly before the official strip was finalised.

== Synopsis ==
Pansy Potter is the daughter of a strong man, and she has dark, spiky hair and wears a short-sleeved, collared dress. Her stories were comedic with the punchlines being about the casual use of her superhuman strength shocking everyone around her.

== Publication history ==
=== Original run (1938-1947) ===
Potter debuted in Pansy Potter the Strong Man's Daughter in issue 21. McNeill illustrated her stories until he had to abandon his career to draw maps in the Second World War. Hairy Dan's creator Basil Blackaller continued the series until sometime in 1944 and was succeeded by Sam Fair for three years. Fair's final story appeared in issue 325.

=== In Wonderland era (1949-1955) ===
In 1949, Potter starred in a new funny strip that became a full-page spread on the back cover: Pansy Potter in Wonderland. In the strip, Potter accidentally walks into Wonderland through a wishing well and meets characters from nursery rhymes. The Beano celebrated its run by making it the first series on the back cover to be in colour. From issue 369, Pansy Potter in Wonderland had over 200 stories designed by James Clark. When Potter returned home, Clark continued creating her stories until the new Pansy Potter series ended in issue 652.

=== Third Run (1958) ===
Charles Grigg and Gordon Bell alternated between the revival over 3 years later in its 42-strip 1958 run.

==== Sparky appearances ====
In the 1960s and 1970s Pansy Potter starred in her own comic strip in DC Thomson's Sparky magazine. There were two series between issues 2 to 24, and 80 to 567. She would also appear in four of Sparky's annuals.

=== 1989–1993 Beano revival ===
Pansy Potter returned to The Beano in issue 2474 in 1989 this time drawn by Barry Glennard. This series continued until issue 2640 in 1993.

==== Funsize Funnies ====
Potter returned to The Beano in 2013 between issues 3666 and 3674 in the Funsize Funnies section, drawn by Nigel Parkinson. She returned for a second run later on, where she was drawn and written by Kev F. Sutherland. She cameos in Beano's 2013 and 2019 annuals, as well as in the magazine's 80th anniversary crossover.

== See also ==
- Pippi Longstocking

== Sources ==
=== Bibliography ===
- Riches, Christopher, ed. (2008). The History of The Beano: The Story So Far. Dundee (DC Thomson); New Lanark (Waverly Books): DC Thomson; Waverly Books. ISBN 978-1-902407-73-9.
- Anderson, John, ed. (2018). Beano: 80 Years of Fun. D.C. Thomson & Co. Ltd. ISBN 9781845357023.
