= Joe Jitsu =

British comic strip, 2004–2006

- Comic strip character(s) from The Beano

Publication information
- Stars in: Joe Jitsu
- First appearance: Issue 3214 (21 February 2004)
- Last appearance: June 2006
- Also appeared in: The Beano Annual

Main Character
- Name: Joe Jitsu

Joe Jitsu was a British humour comic strip, published in the British comics magazine The Beano, between 2004 and 2006. The comic was voted into the magazine after a poll by Beano readers in early 2004, along with another comic strip, Colin the Vet. Joe narrowly defeated Colin, but both became regulars in the comic, as Joe's victory was by just 1%.

The strip, drawn by Wayne Thompson, who was also the artist for The Beano's Billy Whizz and Jak in The Dandy, was about a boy who had a black belt in Karate. Some early strips also featured a man by the name of Johnny Woo, whose plans to get Joe into his dojo were never successful. Joe Jitsu also has a sister, called Jude.

In 2006, Joe's strip made a reappearance in The Beano. However, this was only a short run as the strips were stockpiled, and after Alan Digby became Beano editor his strip quietly disappeared. Joe Jitsu also appeared in the long story "Custard's Last Stand", which was reprinted in the Bash Street Kids annual 2010, as well as a one-panel cameo in Pluggy Love in the 2008 Beano annual.
