= Mike Pearse =

British cartoonist

Mike Pearse (born 1966) is a cartoonist notable for the work he has drawn and written for The Beano comic. His first multi-page strip, debuted in August 1999 and was called "It's A Funny Old Game." It was 24 pages in length and it is the first time in Beano's history to be the only featured story. Since then he has created work for The Bash Street Kids, the Three Bears, and other Beano characters. Mike Pearse is recognized for his unique and highly detailed artwork, animated characters and quick-witted storylines. Nowadays he's working for Studio Beer, an advertising agency in the Netherlands.

== List of Work ==
- It's A Funny Old game, Beano #2978 14 August 1999
- The Great Bash Street Nativity Play, Beano #2997, 25 December 1999
- Finders Keepers, Beano #3025, 8 July 2000
- A Nightmare on Bash Street, Beano #3041, 28 October 2000
- Dennis's Big Birthday Party, Beano #3061, 17 March 2001
- Continuous artist for The Bash Street Kids Singled Out. First appearance Beano #3226, 15 May 2004. Continued until 2009
- Continuous artist for The Three Bears. First appearance Beano #2974, 1999
- The Bash Street Kids in Space Cadets 2009
- The Bash Street Kids Annual 2010
