= Crazy for Daisy =

British comic strip

- Comic strip character(s) from The Beano

Publication information
- Creator(s): Nick Brennan
- First appearance: Issue 2865 (14 June 1997)
- Last appearance: Issue 3400 (29 September 2007)
- Also appeared in: The Beano Annual
- Current status: Discontinued

Characters
- Regular characters: Daisy, Ernest Valentine

Crazy for Daisy was a British comic strip by Nick Brennan published in the magazine The Beano. It debuted on 14 June 1997 in issue 2865 as a part of a selection of six comic strips to be voted by readers. The strip won (along with Tim Traveller), beating Camp Cosmos, Have a Go Jo, Sydd and Trash Can Ally.

== Concept ==
The strip starred Ernest Valentine, a stupid boy who is hopelessly in love with Daisy. Daisy, however, has no feelings at all for Ernest, but Ernest always fails to get the message. He follows her around and even pops out of cakes to see her. Usually, by the end of the strip, Daisy ends up going out with another man who is in some way connected with the strip, e.g. a fireman that gets called out. Daisy has only one set of clothes, and, not counting the earliest strips, never wears anything else. In one strip she opens her wardrobe and she has many sets of identical clothes and then shops for more.

Ernest Valentine

By the time the 2000s came, the strip was still going strong, but with a slight twist to the usual ending of the strip; rather than Ernest being jilted by Daisy for another man, Ernest usually ended up being beaten up, falling from a great height, or otherwise suffering some painful misfortune, which usually put him in traction. While probably not totally intentional, this was part of the Beano's recent move towards using more slapstick.

For a while Joe King's Joke Corner was at the bottom of this strip, but was moved later on.

Once it was dropped from the weekly Beano, the Fun-Size Beano still reprinted some stories from previous Fun-Sizes. It was the most recent strip ever featured in Classics from the Comics, with a 2003 story appearing in the August 2008 issue, Number 148.
