= Bolton Lads and Girls Club =

English charity

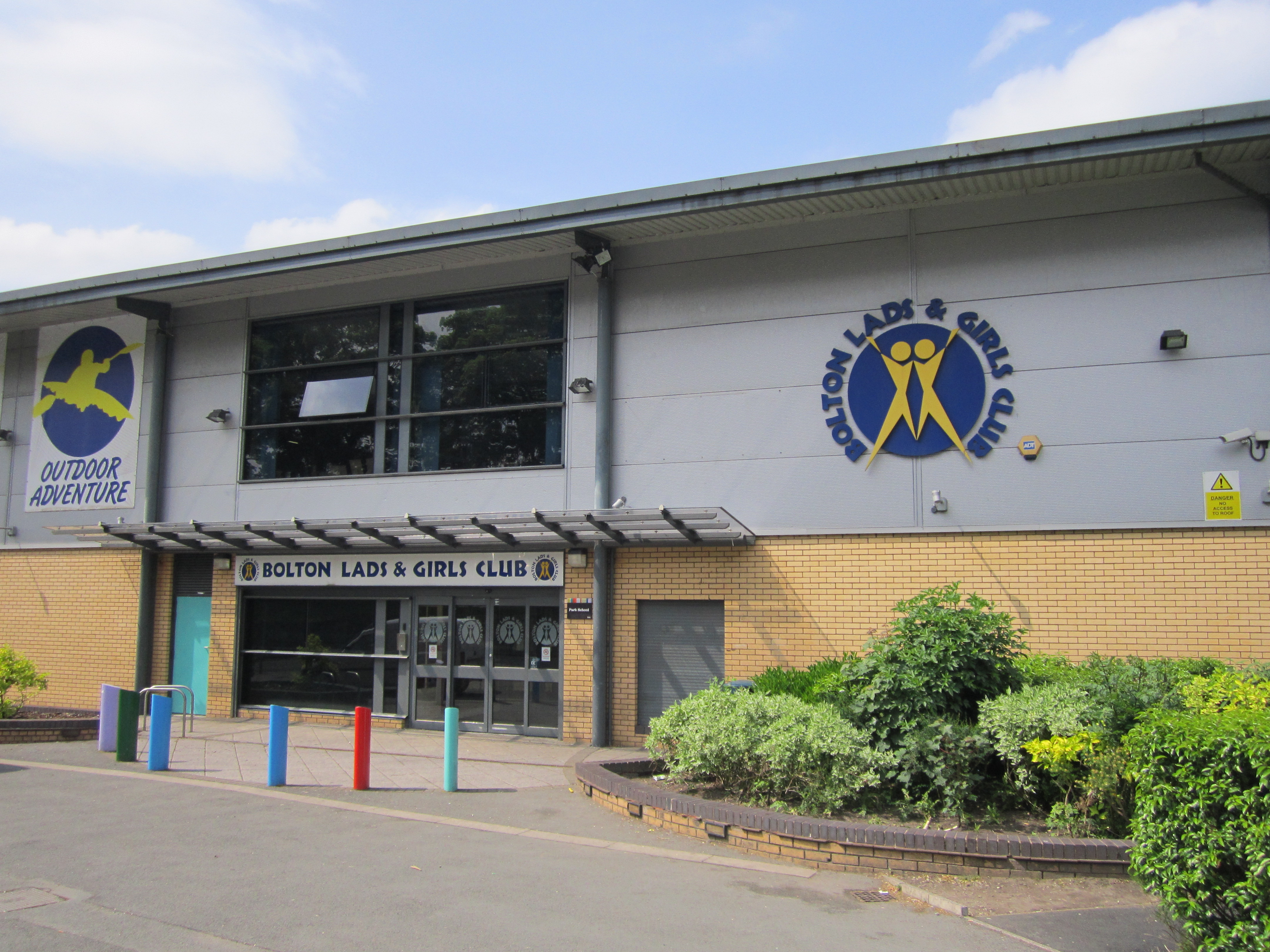
- Founded: 1889
- Type: Registered charity
- Registration no.: 03109525
- Location: Bolton, England
- Coordinates: 53°34′39.00″N 2°26′26.34″W
- Region served: Bolton
- Key people: Emma Hutchinson (Chief Executive)
- Website: boltonladsandgirlsclub.co.uk

Bolton Lads and Girls Club is a youth club and registered charity based in Bolton, Greater Manchester, England.

It is the largest youth club in the United Kingdom, with a membership of over 4,000 young people. Based in Bolton's town centre, the club is open 7 days a week, 51 weeks a year and welcomes all young people aged 8 to 19 years old (up to 21 for young people with disabilities).

Bolton Lads and Girls Club offers a range of targeted and universal provisions including sports, arts, mentoring and community outreach work.

== History ==
Bolton Lads and Girls Club was established in 1889 in Bark Street, Bolton, during a time of great industrial and social change, by two church leaders and three industrialists, who decided they needed to help improve the lives of young people in Bolton. The club was open every evening from 7 pm to 9:30 pm and provided a place to wash and eat, as well as a reading room, gymnasium and a games room that offered football, cricket, swimming, harriers, chess club, and wood turning. The club also ran an annual camping holiday.

In June 1890, the club was officially opened by the Bishop of Manchester, Dr Moorhouse, and in his opening speech he stated that when he first came to Bolton it struck him that the whole of this part of the country was covered with houses and human beings and that he could not see where there would be any open spaces for breathing or exercising. He commended the club founders saying, "they could do not a greater service to a youth than to give him opportunities for healthy outdoor exercise."

An extract from the 1896 Club Review shows how quickly the club became popular:

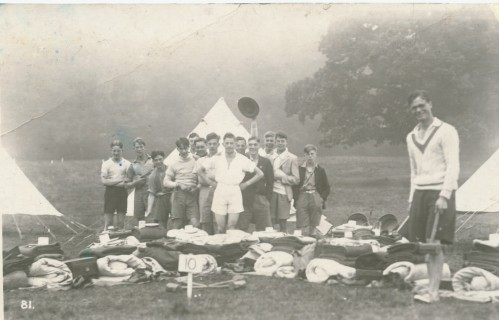
Bolton Lads and Girls Club has been active in Bolton since 1889

"They came in their hundreds, for of all animals, lads are perhaps the most gregarious. They came to meet their fellows under conditions somewhat more comfortable and convenient than their natural meeting place, the street. They initially came for amusement and for games and for nothing else, and if we had told them it was our intention to improve them they would certainly not have come. But it is interesting how quickly their attitude to the Club has changed, it is no longer our Club, it is theirs, and we merely manage it for them. It is no longer a mere place of amusement, but is a place which plays a real part in their lives, it is a place for honour and for success."

In 2002, Bolton Lads and Girls Club opened a purpose-built, state of the art youth facility in the town centre from where they provide a range of universal and targeted services that are fully accessible and affordable at 50 pence per session.

The Prime Minister David Cameron visited the Lads and Girls Club in 2010.

In July 2012, David Cameron gave the club's Chief Executive, Karen Edwards OBE a number of tickets to the 2012 Summer Olympics in response to the 2011 England riots, and to specific people who had contributed to their communities and the "Big Society" policy.

In 2014, the club celebrated its 125th year with the creation of an Alumni society formed of former members, volunteers, mentors and supporters.

A new chief executive Emma Hutchinson was appointed in June 2023.

In 2023 the club officially changed its brand name to BLGC as part of a modern evolution of its brand.

In November 2023, Home Security Suella Braverman spoke to volunteers about the recent conflict in the Middle East during a visit to Bolton Lads and Girls Club.

== Activities ==
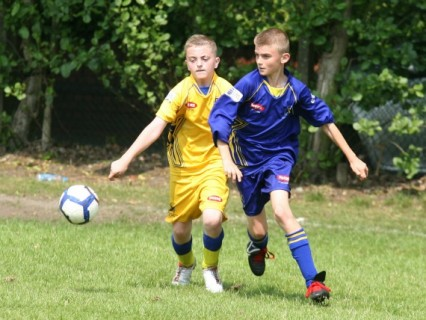
Football at Bolton Lads and Girls Club

Bolton Lads and Girls Club aims to help all young people aged 8 to 21, to succeed in life through a wide range of programmes.

=== Universal Provisions ===
- Evening Junior and Senior Youth Club: For Junior Members aged 8 to 12 and Senior Members aged 13 to 21, Evening Youth Club sessions provide a range of recreational, sporting and social activities.
- Fusion Arts activities: including dance, drama and theatre
- Sports Development: 32 different sports including table tennis, football and trampolining are offered at varying levels of participation including taster sessions, refereeing and coaching opportunities. Structured team play also takes place, with league involvement in the North West.
- Youth Enterprise: Activities to raise aspirations regarding future education, training or employment, including Passport to Work, Work Placements, Job Club, Taste of Enterprise, Apprenticeships, Business Projects and Functional Skills training.
- Accreditation: These include Youth Accreditation Awards, the Duke of Edinburgh Award scheme and ASDAN programmes.
- Residential Opportunities: Residential weekends are held throughout the year at specialist Outdoor Recreational venues in the North West.

=== Targeted Provisions ===
- Holiday Club: Sports, recreational games, structured activities and excursions offered to young people aged 8 to 12 years old during school holidays.
- Mentoring: A bespoke Mentoring programme which matches trained volunteer adult Mentors with at risk young people aged 8 to 19, (up to 21 with disabilities) for a period of up to 12 months through the following strands:
  - Junior Mentoring: For children aged 8 to 12
  - Senior Mentoring: Support for older beneficiaries aged 13 to 19
  - Looked after Children Mentoring: Young people aged 10 to 18 who are looked after by the Local Authority
  - Leaving Care: Young people aged 16 plus who are leaving the care system and preparing for independent living
- Outreach and Detached work: Delivering programmes of activities for and interactions with socially excluded young people on local estates and in centre-based environments.
- Young Citizens: A youth volunteering programme which encourages young people aged 10 to 14 to take part in volunteering activities in their local community.
- Young Leaders: A volunteer programme for young people aged 14 to 18 which trains them to design, deliver and evaluate the Holiday Club provision for younger members aged 8 to 12.
- National Citizens Service: 16 to 17 year olds participates in 4 weeks of residential and community activity sustained by on-going voluntary action.
- Inclusion: Dedicated support for young people with additional needs and disabilities

== Notable people ==
Bolton Lads and Girls Club has an active Patrons society composed of individuals, and local and national businesses.

- Ross Warburton MBE of Warburtons Ltd., former club president (1999-2015)
- Patricia Morris, Baroness Morris of Bolton, club president (June 2015 - ) and former Shadow Minister for Women
- Amir Khan, professional boxer

== Awards ==
- 1999 – Richard Jeremy Glover (youth leader) was appointed MBE at The Queen's 1999 Birthday Honours for services to young people.
- 2010 – In recognition of Bolton Lads and Girls Club's mentoring service and work, it was awarded the Queens Award for Voluntary Service.
- 2012 – Its CEO, Karen Edwards, was awarded the OBE at the Queen's 2012 Birthday Honours for services to the voluntary sector.
- 2013 – CEO, Karen Edwards was also nominated for the 2013 Sunday Times and Sky Sports Sportswomen of the Year Award, eventually won by Christine Ohuruogu, the reigning 400 m world champion and 2008 Olympic champion.
- 2015 – Department of Education's Regional Character Award winner for pilot Young Citizens project.

== See also ==
- Internet Watch Foundation
- NSPCC
- Kidscape
- The Children's Society
- Timeline of young people's rights in the United Kingdom
