= The Three Bears (comic strip) =

British comic strip

- Characters from The Beano

Publication information
- Stars of: The Three Bears
- Author(s): Uncredited
- Illustrator(s): Leo Baxendale; Alan Ryan; Bob McGrath; Tom Lavery; Bob Dewar; David Parkins; Robert Nixon
- First appearance: Issue 881; (6 June 1959)
- Last appearance: Issue 3566 (1 January 2011)
- Current status: Discontinued
- Group timeline: Issues 881 – 884, 852 – 2253, 2391 – 2786, 3365 – ??, 3541 – 3566

Characters
- Type of group: Family
- Members of group: Ma Bear, Pa Bear, Teddy/Ted
- Other characters: Hank

The Three Bears was a long-running British comic strip which appeared in the British comics magazine The Beano. It first featured in 1959's issue 881 and ran sporadically until 2011 through reprints and several artists.

== Synopsis ==
Ma and Pa Bear and their young son Teddy (later called Ted) were three anthropomorphic bears who lived in a setting loosely based on the American Wild West. They were lazy and gluttonous, and lived in a cave upon a hill. Most storylines revolved around their attempts to steal "grub" from the local storekeeper Hank (who often shoots at the Three Bears with his blunderbuss for trying to rob him). There was the occasional appearance by the local sheriff, and their rival bear Grizzly Gus (who had a son called Gus's Grizzly).

== Publication history ==
It made its first appearance in issue 881, drawn by Leo Baxendale at first and then by Bob McGrath for most of its run.

Originally disappearing from the comic after issue 2253, by which time McGrath had departed and briefly been replaced by Tom Lavery, the strip has returned to The Beano several times since then, between 1988 and 1995, re-appearing from issues 2391 and 2674. The first re-launch was drawn by Bob Dewar, and the second originally by David Parkins, who drew it for much of the mid-1990s, then Robert Nixon later on. Parkins' version is cited by former Beano editor Euan Kerr as one of his favourite strips.

=== 1999–2007 strips ===
The strip appeared again in 2000, when, after being a 'Guest Star' since the previous year, it was voted into the comic by Beano readers, beating Tricky Dicky, Inspector Horse and Jocky and Gordon Bennett. This time it was drawn by Mike Pearse, but in 2002 Chris McGhie replaced him to relieve Pearse's workload, although the strip was drawn in a largely similar style.

After a vote in 2006, the Three Bears re-appeared as reprints of the 1990s David Parkins strips. He had also drawn Fred's Bed, Dennis the Menace and Gnasher, and Billy Whizz, all of which have been reprinted in some form. In the 2007 Christmas special (reprinted from the 2000 Christmas Beano), The Three Bears had a present delivered by Billy Whizz, before they return to Beanotown at the end of the strip.

They appeared in the Beano Annual 2007 again drawn by Parkins, and in the Beano Annual 2008 in which Ted shaves off animals' hair including Pa's. This was drawn by Ken Harrison. They made another appearance in The Beano's 2008 Summer Special, again drawn by Chris McGhie. In the 2009 annual they were drawn by Hunt Emerson, appearing alongside another Western-themed Beano star, Little Plum.

Their final new story in the weekly comic came in issue 3365 of The Beano, drawn by Tom Paterson. This was a new strip, not a reprint. The characters later reappeared three years later in issue 3541.

=== Recent appearances ===
In annuals, they have been drawn by Mike Pearse (2001, 2002, 2003), Chris McGhie (2004), Ken Harrison (2005, 2006, 2008), David Parkins (2007), Hunt Emerson (2009) and David Sutherland (2012).

The Three Bears are often seen in the BeanoMAX and Beano annuals, although they hardly ever make appearances in the comic itself. They continued weekly in the comic, as reprints of the Mike Pearse strips until early 2011 when the strip stopped appearing. In the 2012 Beano Annual, their strip was drawn by David Sutherland.

The Three Bears are featured in the 2015 Beano Annual.

The Three Bears made a cameo appearance in the 2022 Beano annual, in two panels of a Betty and hse Yeti.

== Parodies of the strip ==
The strip was the subject of two parodies by the adult comic Viz.

- The first was a surreal parody entitled 'The Three Chairs', about a family of three chairs who lived in a cave and frequently robbed Frank's Store for food.
- The second was called 'Three Blairs' in which Pa represented the then British Prime Minister Tony Blair, Ma represented Cherie Blair (Tony Blair's wife), Ted represented Leo Blair (Tony Blair's youngest son), and Hank represented the then British Chancellor Gordon Brown. In this story the Three Blairs plan to rob "Hank's" store so that "Pa" won't faint in the House of Commons due to hunger. To distract "Hank" while "Ma" and "Ted" rob the store "Pa" stages a press conference outside "Hank's" store and states that all the conditions have been met for Britain to start using the Euro. "Hank" promptly states this is untrue and chases after "Pa" while shooting at him. Though this plan works "Ma" and "Ted" have eaten all the food by the time "Pa" has returned home. In the last panel the newspaper reads that the Prime Minister has fainted in the House of Commons. Coincidentally this strip was drawn by Brian Walker, a former Beano artist, albeit never on The Three Bears.
- 'The Three Shakespeares' also appeared in Viz in February/March 1999. The Shakespeares were engaged in attempting to steal sonnets from Christopher Marlowe, who in one scene had left them out on the windowsill "to cool". Eventually they were given a slap-up meal by Francis Bacon: "Slobber. Our favourite – dramatic monologues composed in iambic decasyllabic blank verse. And mash."

Bryan Talbot's graphic novel series Grandville - set in a world of anthropomorphised animals - features a cameo by the bears as a musical hall act called Les Baxendales.
