= Basil Blackaller =

British cartoonist (1921-1958)

- Born: Basil Frank Blackaller; 1921 Christchurch, Hampshire, England
- Died: 30 January 1958 (aged 36–37) Wimbledon, Surrey, England, United Kingdom
- Notable works: Pansy Potter, Hairy Dan, Ace O' Hara, Captain Falcon

Basil Blackaller (1921–1958) was a British cartoonist and comics artist who drew comics for the British children's magazines The Beano and The Dandy. He was born in Christchurch, Hampshire in 1921.

His best known strip was "Pansy Potter, the Strongman's Daughter" for the Dandy, which he took over from creator Hugh McNeill in 1939 and drew throughout the Second World War. Between 1938 and 1946 he also drew Hairy Dan.

Blackaller was also the artist of the syndicated SF newspaper strip "Ace O'Hara" through Mercury Features and for "Captain Falcon" in Rocket. He died in Wimbledon in 1958, at the young age of just 36.
