= Julie Markes =

American children's book writer

Julie Markes is an American children's book writer. She has also worked as a photographer for the Los Angeles Times and the Associated Press.

== Books ==
=== Good Thing You're Not an Octopus! ===
Markes' first book, Good Thing You're Not an Octopus! (ISBN 006028465X), was released by HarperCollins in 2001. It features artwork by Maggie Smith and is intended for children ages three to six. In the book, a boy is encouraged to perform his daily tasks by being told to imagine how difficult those tasks would be if he were an animal. When he does not want to get dressed, for example, his caretaker tells him to be thankful he is not an octopus, which would need to put eight legs into its pants, instead of just two.

The book was favorably reviewed by Publishers Weekly, which called it "a bit of inventive psychology for dealing with an uncooperative child". School Library Journal described it as "[a] delightful romp", adding, "The ridiculousness of the animals in the boy's situation will not be lost on [pre-schoolers] and will prompt laughter all around."

=== I Can't Talk Yet, But When I Do... ===
Markes' I Can't Talk Yet, But When I Do... (ISBN 0060099216) was published by HarperFestival in 2003. It is illustrated by Laura Rader. The book is about an anthropomorphic mouse and her baby brother, who wishes to thank his sister for being patient with him. The rhyming text of the story reveals what he would say to her if he had the ability to speak. Publishers Weekly wrote, "[Markes and Rader] subtly underscore the competence, achievements and vital role of the older child. . . . Smart and sympathetic, this tale offers a strong note of encouragement to new older siblings."

=== Where's the Poop? ===
In 2004, HarperCollins published Markes' Where's the Poop? (ISBN 0060530898), a toilet training book with illustrations by Susan Kathleen Hartung. In the book, animal parents ask their young offspring if they have "made a poop"; readers are then invited to lift flaps to see illustrations of each animal's leavings. Peter Mandel of The Providence Journal described the book as "[e]ven more bizarre than Walter [the Farting Dog]," but Kim Boatman of the San Jose Mercury News called it "a necessity. . . for parents prone to despair over potty training". Courteney Cox named it one of her children's favorite books in a People magazine feature.

=== Shhhhh! Everybody's Sleeping ===
Shhhhh! Everybody's Sleeping (ISBN 0060537906) is a bedtime story that discusses fictional bedtimes for people of different professions (farmer, baker, etc.) It was published by HarperCollins in 2004. The book was selected by School Library Journal as a Best Book of 2005. It was also named one of Scholastic's "Best Before-Bed Read-Alouds".

== Other books ==
- Sidewalk 123 (ISBN 0694015008), 2001, HarperCollins
- Sidewalk ABC (ISBN 0694014559), 2001, HarperCollins
- Thanks for Thanksgiving (ISBN 006051096X), 2004, HarperCollins
