= Roger the Dodger =

British comic strip character from The Beano

Roger Dawson
- Character from The Beano

Publication information
- Star of: Roger the Dodger (1953 – present); Roger the Dodger's Dodge Clinic (1986–1992); Roger the Toddler (1989); Roger's Dodge Diary (2011)
- First appearance: Issue 561; (18 April 1953)
- Appearance timeline: Issues 561 – 928, 980 – present
- Creator(s): Beano staff
- Author(s): Uncredited
- Illustrator(s): Ken Reid (1953–1959, 1962–1964); Gordon Bell (1959–1960); Bob McGrath (1961–1962); Robert Nixon (1964–1973, 1986–2002); Tom Lavery (1973–1976); Frank McDiarmid (1976–1986); Barrie Appleby (2003–2011, 2012–2013, 2014 – present); Jamie Smart (2013–2014); Wayne Thompson (2014)

Roger Dawson (first generation)
- Family: Bill Dawson (father), Willow Dawson (mother), Dodge Cat (pet), Roger's sister
- Friends: Dave, Crafty Colin, and Sneaky Pete
- Enemies: Cruncher Kerr, Winnie the Wangler

Roger Dawson (second generation)
- Family: Alfred Dawson (father)
- Friends: Dave

Also appeared in
- Beano works: The Beano Annual (1955 – present); The Beano Summer Special (1964 – present); Beano Comic Library (issues 12, 22, 30, 46, 58, 63, 72, 78, 94, 108, 150)
- DC Thomson works: Fun Size Comics; The Dandy (1987); The Best of The Beezer (issues 1 and 2); Hoot (1986)

Roger the Dodger is a comic strip character from the comic magazine The Beano. He first appeared in his eponymous comic strip in 1953, and is one of the longest-running characters, characterised by his tactics for avoiding responsibility and his parents' rules, or simply making chores easier, usually with the help of instructional "dodge" books.

== Character background ==
Ken Reid was recommended to DC Thomson by his brother-in-law Bill Holroyd, who illustrated for The Beano. Reid travelled to Dundee and was first tasked to design comic strip panels for a new character: a boy who did anything to evade responsibilities and favours.

After the design was approved, a three-panel advertisement printed in issue 560, showing Roger failing to sneak out the house before his father noticing, finding out instantly that his father had set up a tripwire. The caption revealed this was a teaser to a new comic strip called Roger the Dodger, boasting, "You really think his dad has really caught him dodging his homework, don't you? JUST YOU WAIT! ROGER ISN'T FINISHED YET!"

== Characteristics ==
Unlike most Beano characters, Roger does not intentionally cause chaos and mayhem, despite his attempts at dodging responsibilities and punishments often creating it. Ken Reid's early stories frequently had Roger get caught by his family members, that do not hesitate with the cruelty of their vengeance. Reid's final panels would show Roger being forced to do his chore (or clean up after his antics create more damage than intended) as a family member (usually his father) supervises with a smirk. In earlier strips, Roger would often be spanked by his father's slipper as punishment.

Roger has dark hair with a shaggy tuft at the front. He wears a red-and-black chequered jumper over his white, collared shirt. Initially he wore a tie, but this was discontinued in the 21st century, as well as the black shorts he also wore, that were changed to black trousers in the 1970s.

== Publication history ==
He first appeared in issue 561, dated 18 April 1953. His appearance is vaguely similar to that of Dennis the Menace from the same magazine: he wears a black-and-red chequered jumper and black trousers, but takes better care of his hair than his equally mischievous counterpart. He also used to have a white tie, but it seems to have disappeared. Originally drawn by Ken Reid, Gordon Bell took over in 1959, but Roger dodged his way out of the Beano in 1960. He returned, drawn by Bob McGrath, in April 1961. Ken Reid was re-commissioned to draw the strip in 1962, and Robert Nixon when Reid left D. C. Thomson & Co. in 1964. When Nixon left in 1973, Tom Lavery began drawing the strip, who was then followed by Frank McDiarmid in 1976.

Ten years later, after Euan Kerr took over as Beano editor, Nixon returned, drawing in a noticeably different style from the one before. Roger's strip was given a second page in 1986. Between 1986 and 1992, a spin-off strip appeared at the end called Roger the Dodger's Dodge Clinic. Readers would write in with problems, and Roger would try to find a dodge for it (which would usually go wrong). Winning suggestions would win a transistor radio and special scroll. Roger is often shown in other Beano characters' stories offering "help", which he took to a new level in Beano issue 2648 from April 1993. This issue marked Roger's 40th birthday, and to celebrate he made appearances in every strip in the comic.

Nixon continued drawing it until his death in October 2002, though due to the strips being drawn months in advance, his strips continued appearing in the Beano until the end of January 2003, when artist Barrie Appleby took over. He drew the strip until 2011, when he stopped to concentrate on Dennis and Gnasher, though Trevor Metcalfe drew a few strips in 2003 and 2004, and there have also been some Robert Nixon reprints during 2005 and 2006. Since Appleby stopped drawing Roger, the comic has run reprints of Robert Nixon strips from the 1980s. Along with the Nixon reprints, Roger's Dodge Diary was introduced on the second half of Roger's pages, where Beano readers can send in their own dodges. In each one, Roger says a good thing, a bad thing and the results of the dodge. When the Beano was revamped on 8 August 2012, Appleby started drawing Roger again and Roger's parents were made younger. In the 75th birthday issue released on 24 July 2013, Jamie Smart took over as artist. On 9 April 2014, Wayne Thompson replaced Jamie Smart as Roger's artist, until Barrie Appleby returned to draw the strip temporarily, before Wayne Thompson surprisingly returned. In 2017, writing duties for the strip were taken over by Danny Pearson.

Roger is currently the second-longest-running character in the Beano, behind only Dennis the Menace. However, if taken into account the strip's absence in 1960 then he would be the third-longest-running behind Minnie the Minx.

== Other characters in the strip ==
- Willow and Bill Dawson, Roger’s parents. In one strip in the Beano Book from 1957, his dad is referred to as Bill. He has occasionally been shown to have been a dodger in his youth and on occasion asks Roger for dodging help. In later years, his parents were renamed Les and Ada.
- His rival is a bully named Cruncher Kerr (believed to be named after Euan Kerr, though his earliest appearances predate Kerr's appointment as Beano Editor in 1994).
- Roger has had two different pets, a Crow called Joe the Crow and a Cat called Dodge Cat.
- Roger also had two friends, Crafty Colin and Sneaky Pete. These two mainly appeared in the 1990s, though Pete did reappear in the 2006 Beano Annual. However, in the late 2000s, Roger gained a new friend called Dave.
- Winnie The Wangler has sometimes appeared in the strip, as Roger's female equivalent and adversary.

== Timeline ==
18 April 1953: Roger The Dodger made his debut in issue 561, drawn by Ken Reid.
1959: Gordon Bell becomes the artist.
1960: Roger's first series ends.
April 1961: Roger returns to the Beano, drawn by Bob McGrath.
1962: Reid becomes Roger's artist again.
1964: Robert Nixon takes over.
1973: Tom Lavery takes over.
circa.1975 Roger starts wearing trousers full-time
1976: Frank McDiarmid takes over.
1986: Nixon returns to draw Roger again, he moves to two pages and Roger The Dodger's Dodge Clinic is introduced.
1992: Roger The Dodger's Dodge Clinic ends.
April 1993: Roger's 40th anniversary is celebrated.
January 2003: Barrie Appleby takes over after Nixon's death.
2011: Appleby stops drawing Roger to focus on Dennis and Gnasher, and Roger's Dodge Diary is introduced alongside Nixon reprints.
2012: Appleby resumes drawing Roger after Nigel Parkinson takes over Dennis and Gnasher.
July 2013: Jamie Smart takes over as artist.
April 2014: Wayne Thompson takes over as artist.
July 2014: Barrie Appleby returns as artist.
April 2023: Roger's 70th anniversary is celebrated.

== In other media ==
=== TV ===
Roger appears on the cover of 1994's Beano Videostars but not on the video itself. He also made a non-speaking appearance in an advert for The Beano along with Dennis and Gnasher, Minnie the Minx, Billy Whizz, Teacher from The Bash Street Kids and Biffo the Bear. As such, Roger the Dodger is yet to have been given a voice actor.

=== Theme park ===
- Roger appeared in the Beanoland section at Chessington World of Adventures with his own ride, Roger the Dodger's Dodgems.

=== Video games ===
- Roger appeared in the PC racing game Beanotown Racing as a playable character. His vehicle was a checkered bumper car.
- Roger also featured as a character in The Beano Interactive DVD which consisted of mini-games and a few short animations.

== See also ==
- The Beano
