= Tim Traveller =

1997–2004 British comic strip in The Beano

- Comic strip character(s) from The Beano

Publication information
- Creator(s): Vic Neill
- Other contributors: Keith Reynolds
- Current/last artist: Richard Elson
- First appearance: Issue 2862 (24 May 1997)
- Last appearance: Issue 3228 (29 May 2004)
- Also appeared in: The Beano Annual
- Current status: Discontinued

Main Character
- Name: Tim Traveller
- Family: Mum; Dad

Characters
- Regular characters: Tim, Tim's Mum, Tim's Dad

Tim Traveller was a British comic strip created by Vic Neill and published in the British comics magazine The Beano. He first appeared in issue 2862, dated 24 May 1997, as part of a continuing set of six new comic strips where the one with the most votes would be voted into the comic by readers.

== Concept ==
The first strip featured Tim looking for a bicycle in the town dump, and finding an unusual one. Pulling a dial at the front he was transported to caveman times, at which point he realised the bike could travel through time. He and Crazy for Daisy were the joint winners of the poll, beating Camp Cosmos, Have a Go Jo, Sydd and Trash Can Ally. It was drawn by Vic Neill until his death in 2000. However, Neill strips continued to run for some time in the comic as they had been stockpiled. Once these had run out, Keith Reynolds drew it up to 2004 when the strip was dropped. Only 5 strips appeared in the character's final twelve months in the comic. In the 2003 Beano annual, his strip was drawn by Richard Elson.

Tim Traveller would use his bicycle to travel back and forth in time, encountering all sorts of crazy mishaps, occasionally getting in so much trouble he had to rush back to the present day to avoid it. Some of his trips resulted in him causing or learning the truth about various historical mysteries, such as why the Leaning Tower of Pisa leaned (it fell over in an earthquake and Tim only managed to partly pull it back into position) or what happened to the crew of the Mary Celeste (Tim visited the ship and fell into a large fish, appearing to the crew as a sea monster, causing them to dive overboard).

The character was revived briefly in 2019 this time written by Tommy Donbavand.
