= Robert Nixon (comics) =

British comics artist (1939–2002)

- Born: 7 July 1939 South Bank, Middlesbrough, North Yorkshire, U.K.
- Died: 22 October 2002 (aged 63)
- Areas: Cartoonist, Artist

Robert Nixon (7 July 1939 – 22 October 2002) was an artist who worked on several British comics.

== Biography ==
=== Early life and education ===
Nixon was born in South Bank, Middlesbrough, in North Yorkshire on 7 July 1939. He was the fifth of six children born to Arthur Nixon and Phylis Thompson. Robert's mother Phylis worked as a housewife while his father worked locally as a steelworker.

As a child, Nixon spent much of his time drawing and sketching, and his artistic skills were recognised when he was seven years old by teachers at Cromwell Road School which he attended in South Bank. During his early years as an artist, and supported by teachers at the Central Secondary Modern School (Victoria Street, Southbank), Nixon won several art competitions and a scholarship to Middlesbrough Art College in 1955 when he was sixteen. Although his time at art college was cut short by the death of his father, Nixon gained employment locally as a lithographic artist and left in 1965 to pursue his career as a full-time cartoonist, initially for DC Thomson of Dundee.

During this transition, Nixon met and married Rita Kelly and after living in Middlesbrough for several years they moved to Guisborough, North Yorkshire, where they raised their four children Paul, Tony, Wendy and Catherine.

=== Career ===
In The Beano, he started out drawing Little Plum in the early 1960s after Leo Baxendale left DC Thomson. He later took over Roger the Dodger from Ken Reid and Lord Snooty from Dudley D. Watkins, and revived Grandpa, another Ken Reid creation, in the early 1970s in the same comic, as well as Captain Cutler and His Butler and Esky Mo in Sparky. He left DC Thomson shortly afterwards, and started to work at IPC Magazines (Fleetway), drawing such characters as Kid Kong, Frankie Stein (not to be confused with the Monster High character of the same name) and Gums.

Nixon drew The 12½p Buytonic Boy for Krazy, although Brian Walker frequently deputised when Nixon was on leave. The strip first appeared in issue 1, dated 16 October 1976.

Nixon returned to DC Thomson in 1984 after being asked to by new Beano editor Euan Kerr, and began drawing Roger the Dodger again, as well as creating Ivy the Terrible in 1985. Later his friend Trevor Metcalfe drew this strip.

Nixon's strips are still being reprinted in The Beano, appearing regularly as recently as 2011.

He would go on to draw Beryl the Peril in The Topper and Korky the Cat in The Dandy later on in the decade, and continue drawing them throughout the 1990s.

== Death ==
On 22 October 2002, Nixon died from a heart attack, aged 63.
