= The Beano's Dennis the Menace and Gnasher Show =

- Also known as: Dennis the Menace and Gnasher Show
- Genre: Children's television series; Puppetry; Comedy
- Based on: Characters from The Beano comics
- Written by: Mike Barfield; Bob Harvey
- Directed by: Bob Harvey
- Starring: Logan Murray
- Theme music composer: John Du Prez
- Country of origin: United Kingdom
- Original language: English
- No. of series: 2
- No. of episodes: 100

Production
- Producers: Bob Harvey; Dan Maddicott; Robb Hart
- Running time: 5 minutes
- Production companies: Ultimate Animates Productions Ltd; D.C. Thomson & Co. Starstream

Original release
- Network: The Children's Channel
- Release: 5 November 1990 – 29 November 1991

Related
- The Beano Video (1993); The Beano Videostars (1994); Dennis and Gnasher (1996); Dennis the Menace and Gnasher (2009)

The Beano's Dennis the Menace and Gnasher Show is a British puppet series based on characters from The Beano comic, which aired on The Children's Channel between 5 November 1990 and 29 November 1991. The show was directed and produced by Bob Harvey, Dan Maddicott and Robb Hart and written by Mike Barfield, with voices by Logan Murray.

== Plot ==
The series follows the adventures of Dennis the Menace and his pet dog Gnasher, who cause chaos and destruction around Beanotown. They torment and play pranks on people, including Mum and Dad, who want less mischief from their son, and Walter the Softy, whom Dennis delights in terrorising. However, the menaces find themselves receiving their comeuppance in the end, with their victims getting the last laugh.

In addition to the regular episodes, Dennis and Gnasher also appeared in "Dennis Link Shows". These segments took place in Dennis' den, where he and Gnasher would read viewer mail and present other programming on The Children's Channel.

== Production ==
Mike Barfield had been the producer, writer, researcher and co-presenter of Comic Cuts for British Satellite Broadcasting, produced by The Children's Channel's parent company Starstream. DC Thomson had partial ownership of The Children's Channel, who had been hoping for a long time that they would let them make a show based on Dennis the Menace from The Beano. When Starstream realised that Barfield was a fan of comics from doing Comic Cuts, they offered him the chance to write the pilot. DC Thomson liked it, and the show got commissioned.

Barfield had been reading The Beano since he was a child in the 1960s. He had old annuals and a few comics, but he did not read so many Beano comics once he was a teenager. Fortunately, DC Thomson sent him some comics so that he could catch up with Dennis's further adventures. He wrote all 100 episodes, with one of them co-written by director and producer Bob Harvey. The episodes consisted of story segments written by Barfield in his flat in Shepherd's Bush, and "Dennis Link Shows" set in Dennis' den, where he and Gnasher would read viewer mail, before presenting other programming on The Children's Channel. John Du Prez composed the series' punk-style theme song.

The Children's Channel approached puppet company Ultimate Animates Productions, owned by David Barclay, about creating 3D puppets for the show. The first series featured only three puppets; Dennis, Gnasher and Walter. All other characters could only appear as drawings or be heard offscreen. The puppets were filmed against a green screen and superimposed over hand-drawn backgrounds, done in Paintbox by John Bonner and Bob Jobling. For the second series, two more puppets, Dad and Mum, were made. The comic's creators, including David Sutherland, praised Ultimate Animates for making the most successful 3D versions of their characters that they had seen in 40 years. The characters were puppeteered by Barclay, Mike Quinn, Karen Prell, Christopher Leith, Geoff Felix, Ian Tregonning and Gillie Robic. All the character voices were supplied by Logan Murray.
