= The Beano Video =

- Directed by: Derek Mogford
- Written by: Jo Pullen
- Based on: The Beano
- Produced by: Jo Pullen; Darren Kinnersley-Hill
- Starring: Jonathan Kydd; Gary Martin; Enn Reitel; Kate Robbins; Susan Sheridan
- Narrated by: Jonathan Kydd; Enn Reitel
- Music by: Kick Production
- Production companies: Living Doll Productions; D.C. Thomson & Co.
- Distributed by: PolyGram Video
- Release date: 16 October 1993
- Running time: 52 minutes
- Country: United Kingdom
- Language: English

The Beano Video is a direct-to-video animated film based on The Beano, originally released on VHS on 16 October 1993 and also broadcast as a television special on ITV and CITV. It marked not just the first animated release of the hugely successful children's comic that has spanned many generations, but also the first animated appearance for characters like Dennis the Menace and Gnasher, Gnipper, Minnie the Minx, the Bash Street Kids, and the Three Bears. The video was directed by Derek Mogford and produced by Jo Pullen at Living Doll Productions and Whizzline Productions, and sold more than 200,000 copies. It features voices by Susan Sheridan, Kate Robbins, Enn Reitel, Gary Martin and Jonathan Kydd. Martin and Kydd would later appear in the 1996-98 TV series Dennis and Gnasher.

A sequel to the video was produced and released on 17 October 1994, named The Beano Videostars, and featured an expanded cast of characters. Both videos drew high enough ratings and video sales to kick off the Dennis and Gnasher TV series. The video was re-released on DVD 10 years later in 2004, by then known as The Beano All-Stars.

== Plot ==
The video opens with a giant comic flying towards the camera, with panels featuring all the characters that the video will focus on; Dennis the Menace, Gnasher, Minnie the Minx, the Bash Street Kids and the Three Bears. The characters instantly come to life, and start breaking out of the panels to interact with each other (or rather, pick on each other).

In In on the Act, Walter the Softy decides to enter a talent show, and tries a ventriloquist act with his teddy. Dennis tries a similar act with a dummy based on a prisoner. The dummy's screaming is revealed to belong to a parrot that Dennis trapped in the dummy, and the softies step up their game with a string quartet. Dennis, Gnasher, Curly and Pie-Face turn the softies into living puppets, operated by the menaces in a tree. Unfortunately, the branch that the menaces are perched on breaks under their weight, and the fall renders both sides unfit to perform. However, Gnasher's fleas start acting up, and his frenzied scratching is mistaken for a dance, earning him first prize.

Next, in Face the Music, Professor Quaver, the new music teacher, arrives at Bash Street School. The kids, to his dismay, do not know how to play instruments properly, nor do they know how to sing, opting for a noisy football chant instead. With the class dismissed, Quaver decides that Winston's yowling is far more pleasant to listen to than the kids, and even conducts the cat with a baton.

In Hotdog, Gnasher teaches Gnipper how to get a free meal at a hot dog stand. Gnasher barks fiercely at a customer, startling him so much he drops the hot dog, which Gnasher helps himself to. Gnipper tries the same technique, and it works, until he gets covered in ketchup, which he forgot to check for.

In Porridge, the Three Bears, tired of porridge made from moldy oats, head out in search of dinner. They steal Hank's horse to carry them and their equipment, but are eventually thrown into the sea, where they try fishing. They end up aggravating a shark who chases them back to land, where the bears stumble upon cowboys having a barbecue. Ma and Pa disguise Ted as a cowboy with a pair of dancing bears, and Ted launches the cook's roast skyward while the cook is distracted by Ma and Pa dancing. Some coyotes get to the roast before the bears though, and they decide to just head home. They return home, starving and absurdly thin from their journey, only to find their porridge is gone along with all the oats. As it turns out, the horse that they stole earlier is the culprit.

Next, in Minnie Chairs, Minnie has fun with chairs, using them as trampolines or a mountain, much to her dad's annoyance. Sent to play outside, Minnie finds a way to turn the armchair into a chariot, with the neighbourhood dogs pulling it, but she ends up crashing it and wrecking the chair, forcing her dad to drag her down the high street to buy a new one. Minnie causes havoc in the shop and ends up being dropped into a reclining seat which locks her in place, to her dad's absolute delight.

In Soap Box Cart, Dennis's dad is late for his appointment with the doctor to check up on his sprained wrist. But when Dad remembers he cannot drive with his hand bandaged, Dennis offers to take him there in his carty. The ride is rough for Dad as he is thrown out several times, soaked, and even run over by the cart. Yet, they make it, and Dad's wrist is completely better. But now it is the only part of him that is not bandaged up after his ordeal.

Next, in Lake Beautiful, Plug is openly mocked by the pupils of Posh Street for being "the ugliest boy in the world". Headmaster tells Teacher that something has to be done because Plug is ruining the good name of Bash Street School. Smiffy tries bringing in a mask for Plug, but unwittingly forgets to cut out eye holes, which causes Plug to walk into a wall and smash his face, making him even more ugly. The school doctor, however, reveals that the waters of Lake Beautiful in Tibet can make anybody handsome, so Teacher and the kids fly to Tibet via Cheap-o Airways. They are dropped from their plane on a sledge, which crashes into a Tibetan monastery, where the monks, who have taken a vow of silence and understand English, show the class the way to the lake. On their way, the class discovers a Burger Bar in the form of an igloo. They all order burgers, chips and hotdogs (with the school funds) and discover that the prices are very high. They arrive at Lake Beautiful, where the Keeper sees the problem and acts upon it, trapping the kids in a snowball and launching them into the lake where they all metamorphose into Plug-like faces, or in this case, Keeper-like faces, as he decided all the class needed a "handsome" treatment except Plug.

In Scorcher, Ted's cave is on fire one morning, and the walls crack to reveal an egg containing a baby dragon. The bears name him Scorcher and put him to work getting them food. Scorcher burns the wall of Hank's store, enabling Pa to reach in and steal a chicken. Scorcher helps to cook the chicken back home, and the bears enjoy a good meal, until the dragon gets indigestion and burns Pa's face by accident.

Next, in Sausages, Dennis is playing fetch with Gnasher, who initially is bored, until he smells sausages on the breeze, and encourages Dennis to throw the stick next door. Dennis is able to spear the sausages on the neighbours' grill and Gnasher hops over the fence and retrieves the stick, sausages and all.

Next, in Minnie Apples, the apples on Minnie's dad's tree are ripe, but Minnie cannot reach them on her own. When she tries using a ladder, she is caught by Dad, who forbids her from taking any apples from the tree itself, but agrees that she can have any that fall. Minnie thus tries shaking them loose by stomping around, then charging into the tree itself. She then tries throwing her ball into the branches, but it rebounds off and ends up hitting her dad, whose bellowing ends up shaking every apple loose, right onto Minnie's head, which does not bother her.

In Space Case, Spotty falls into Olive's pea soup, and Plug says that he resembles a martian. Danny tells Teacher that a martian has landed in the playground, which Teacher believes at the sight of Spotty. After the kids help themselves to some of Teacher's biscuits at Fatty's suggestion, Teacher asks where the "martian's" ship is, and is pointed towards a bin in the playground. Teacher is transferred into a dump truck, and tries grabbing the "martian" in revenge, revealing him to be Spotty. What later appears to be more martians later turns out to merely be the other kids covered in green paint from painting the ceiling as punishment.

Next, in Pink Glove, Dennis charges outside, straight into a bowl of sweet-smelling water and a bucket of rose petals, courtesy of a vigilante calling himself the Pink Glove. Dennis clambers out, only to find Rasher in a panic as the Pink Glove has tidied up his sty. Dennis and his pets go in search of the Pink Glove, who uses Dennis's own sock-filled mitt against him, briefly knocks Gnasher out with perfume, tricks Dennis into hugging a teddy bear, and redecorates his room with flowers and soft toys overnight. Dennis narrows the suspects down to Walter, Bertie Blenkinsop and Spotty Perkins, then slides on a block of ice into the softies' chalet, intending to nab whoever puts pink gloves on to move the ice. But the Pink Glove locks Dennis and Gnasher in, and Bertie takes a photograph of the pair when the softies return. Later, Dennis and Gnasher nab the softies with paper chains, and when the leftover gloves do not fit any of them, Dennis uses the softies as bait in a trap. The Pink Glove is revealed to be Walter's mum, who did it to get back at Dennis for picking on Walter.

Next, in Greedy Bears' Picnic, the Three Bears invade two little boys' picnics.

In Minnie Flying, Minnie tries to learn to fly, and fashions herself a set of wings, ending up crashing into a barrel, a tree and later onto her dad's lap. Minnie's Dad tries taking Minnie on an aerobatic stunt plane to get it out of her system. However, all it does is make him ill, and forces the birds to the ground the next day as they are safer there with Minnie now hang-gliding above.

In Big Surprise, Dad warns Dennis that he is overfeeding Gnasher and that he will grow as big as an elephant. When Dennis and Gnasher head for the zoo, Gnasher decides to scare an elephant, and the panicking animal escapes from the zoo, getting himself covered in glue, feathers, and paint, resulting in him resembling a giant Gnasher by the time that he passes Dennis's house. Dad, seeing the elephant, decides that he needs to have a word with his son about overfeeding Gnasher.

Next, in Hare Soup, Pa is sick of porridge and decides to catch a hare to make soup. After getting fitter, Pa heads out to catch one, but is outwitted by the hare, who eventually agrees to make soup for the bears. The hare, impressed by his own cooking, devours the entire broth, and Pa is chased out and beaten for his trouble.

In Molar Mirth, it is Happy Smile Week at Bash Street, and Professor Molaroid, an expert on dental care, is visiting the school. He is unimpressed by the kids' teeth, except Smiffy's, who turns out to be wearing joke ones. After a quick brush, there is improvement all round, and when asked if Teacher would like to join in, it is revealed that his are even worse. When the professor tries eating an apple to prove a point, he chokes on it, turns to be wearing dentures, and leaves in humiliation.

Next, in Gnipper Pecker, Gnipper is freezing in his draughty kennel, but decides to take a leaf out of a woodpecker's book, and pecks a hole in the nearby tree to sleep there. His nap, however, is interrupted by a mother bird who stuffs a load of worms in his mouth.

Finally, in Minnie Clones, Minnie meets her fans, who want to be just like her. She shows them the ropes by tricking a boy into taking a balloon full of hot air off her, while she is weighed down with diving boots, and shooting him down into a duck pond. The fans cause havoc all over Beanotown, and the hapless police report the chaos to the sergeant, who ends up chasing Minnie up a lamppost. Her dad appears from the nearby newsagents, and brings her down with a well-aimed paper airplane. As Minnie is taken home, she is annoyed to find her former fans now idolising her dad instead.

== Episodes ==
1. Dennis the Menace and Gnasher: In on the Act
2. The Bash Street Kids: Face the Music
3. Gnasher and Gnipper: Hotdog
4. The Three Bears: Porridge
5. Minnie the Minx: Minnie Chairs
6. Dennis the Menace and Gnasher: Soap Box Cart
7. The Bash Street Kids: Lake Beautiful
8. The Three Bears: Scorcher
9. Dennis the Menace and Gnasher: Sausages
10. Minnie the Minx: Minnie Apples
11. The Bash Street Kids: Space Case
12. Dennis the Menace and Gnasher: Pink Glove
13. The Three Bears: Greedy Bears Picnic
14. Minnie the Minx: Minnie Flying
15. Dennis the Menace and Gnasher: Big Surprise
16. The Three Bears: Hare Soup
17. The Bash Street Kids: Molar Mirth
18. Gnasher and Gnipper: Gnipper Pecker
19. Minnie the Minx: Minnie Clones

== Voice cast ==
- Susan Sheridan as Dennis the Menace, Walter's Mum, Minnie the Minx, Boy #1 (Benji from Ball Boy), Boy #2, Minnie's Fans, Danny, Fatty, 'Erbert, Toots, Olive, Cheap-o Airways Lady, Ma Bear and Sea Noises
- Kate Robbins as Neighbour's Wife
- Enn Reitel as Plug (two lines in Molar Mirth), Smiffy (burping in Molar Mirth), Singer on Record, Pa Bear, Ma Bear (burping in Scorcher), Ted Bear, Hank, Horse, Dog, Scorcher, Hare and Narrator #2
- Gary Martin as Gnasher, Gnipper, Rasher, Talent Contest Host, Customer, Mother Bird, Tailcoat #1 and Spotty (Face the Music)
- Jonathan Kydd as Dennis' Dad, Walter the Softy, Spotty Perkins, Bertie Blenkinsop, Parrot, Flea #1, Fred, Doctor, Neighbour, Pink Glove, Father, Monkey, Minnie's Dad, Panting Dogs, Chair Store Man, Frog, Policeman #1, Pilot, Bully, Man on Bench, Tailcoat #2, Policeman #2, Sergeant, Policemen, Plug, Smiffy, Spotty (Space Case), Teacher, Headmaster, Posh Street Kids, Professor Quaver, School Doctor, Keeper of Lake Beautiful, Rubbish Collector, Professor Molaroid, Picnic Boy #1 and Narrators #1, #3-10

== Credits ==
- Animation Directors: Tony Garth, David Osbourne
- Animation Crew:
- Storyboards: Mark Mason
- Layouts: Jez Hall, Vincent James
- Backgrounds: Aileen Raistrick
- Animators: Claire Armstrong, Anna Brockett, Martin Collis, Alistair Fell, Delia Gosman (credited as "Dave Gosman"), Laurent Grisel (credited as "Laurent Grisee"), Alain Maindron, Robert Milne, Mike Pfeil, Neil Salmon, Kim Stephenson, Paul Stone, Mair Thomas, Christine Tynan, Dan Whitworth, Kevin Baldwin, Eamonn Butler (credited as "Eamon Butler"), Tony Elmes, Joanne Gooding, Claire Gray, Charles Macrae (credited as "Charlie Macrae"), Gianni Malpeli, John Offord, Andrew Powell, Jim Southworth (credited as "James Southworth"), David Stone, Mike Swindale, George Turner, Glenn Whiting (credited as "Glen Whiting"), Judy Pilsbury
- Paint and Trace: Whizzline Productions, Heather Pedley, Karina Stanford, Greg Smith, Mike Banks, Simon Bradbury, Janet Cable, Miles Clegg, Annie Elvin, Paul Green, Lynn Hardie, Dave Hoctor, Bev James, Carol Leslie, Shaun McClinchy, Helen Mears, Andrew Peters, Anna Roberts, Dave Smith, Mark Stopford, Jenny Thomissen, Pauline Webster, Sue Woodward, Paul Bannister, Helen Buckingham, Jed Casserley, Lynn Durrans, Julie Gleeson, Jode Griffin, Duncan Harris, Nic Howell, Damien Knapper, Suzanna Light, Dave McQuillan, Tracey Paddison, Anne Place, Marie Sheard, Jocelyn Smith, Braid Sweeney, Rosemary Thorburn, Nik Westbury, Samantha Yates
- Rostrum Camera: Jim Davey, Stephen Davey
- Featuring the Voices of: Jonathan Kydd, Gary Martin, Enn Reitel, Kate Robbins, Susan Sheridan
- Production Co-Ordinator: Alison Grade
- Film Editor: Andi Sloss
- Video Tape Editor: Simon Brook
- Music: Kick Production (Ian Nicholls and Rick Mulhall)
- Polygram Executive Producer: Darren Kinnersley-Hill
- Director: Derek Mogford
- Producer: Jo Pullen
- Produced by Living Doll Productions for D.C. Thomson & Co. Limited and Polygram Video Ltd.
- Living Doll

== Broadcast history ==
=== United Kingdom ===
- ITV (1993)
- CITV (1994)
- Fox Kids UK (1996)

=== United States ===
- Fox Kids (1998)
- Nicktoons (2004)
