= Ivy the Terrible =

British comic book character

- Character from The Beano
- Ivy, illustrated by Diego Jourdan.

Publication information
- Star of: Ivy the Terrible (1985–2011, 2014–2015, 2016–2017); Bea and Ivy; Ivy's Favourite Nightmares
- First appearance: Issue 2233; (4 May 1985)
- Last appearance: Issue 3887; (3 June 2017)
- Appearance timeline: Issues 2233 – ??, 3747 – 3765, 3865 – 3887
- Creator(s): Robert Nixon
- Author(s): Uncredited: Stu Munro (2014); John Anderson (2014)
- Illustrator(s): Robert Nixon; Trevor Metcalfe; Tony O'Donell; Nigel Parkinson; Dave Eastbury; Diego Jourdan (2010–2011); Lew Stringer (2014–2017)

In-universe information
- Friends: Bea

Ivy the Terrible is a fictional character featured in The Beano. She is a four-year-old girl who annoys her parents with her misbehaviour. She first appeared in The Beano in 1985 in the comic strip of the same name, but has starred in other comic strips throughout Beano history.

== Character history ==
=== Concept ===
In 1985, The Beano's editor-in-chief Euan Kerr wrote to Robert Nixon about plans of creating a new character that was "tough and menacing like Dennis and Minnie, but doesn't have the strength or maturity to carry it off." The decided character design was a four-year-old girl named Ivy "dressed in dungarees and T-shirt, and with bunches in her hair"

=== Introduction ===
Ivy first appeared in issue #2233, dated 4 May 1985, drawn by Robert Nixon. Throughout the strip, it showed her attempts to become the toughest character in The Beano. Finally, when about to confront Dennis the Menace himself Dennis simply waited until evening at which point Ivy, being a toddler, had simply fallen asleep. He then took her back to her house and remarked, very out of character, that she "almost looked cute". The popularity of the character led to the strip being expanded to two pages as of issue #2931 (19 September 1998). Later strips dropped the idea of her longing for toughness and instead concentrated on her hyperactivity and tantrums. Her popularity even grew to the point she was briefly featured in her own spin-off in which she would choose her favourite nightmares entitled Ivy's Favourite Nightmares.

=== Death of Nixon and later history ===
Robert Nixon continued to draw Ivy until his death in 2002. His successor as artist was Tony O'Donnell, who drew the strip in a very similar style to Nixon, making no major changes to the strip or characters. However, Trevor Metcalfe drew several strips during 2003 and 2004, in which Ivy was given a noticeably more childlike and less malicious personality, although again the strip's style was based on Nixon's. In early 2007, O'Donnell retired from the strip, and reprints of 1989–1998 Robert Nixon stories began running.

In August 2008, the strip was merged with the strip Bea and renamed Bea and Ivy. However, when Dennis the Menace was revamped to match the new TV series a year later, Bea and Ivy were split up and she reverted to being a solo strip, again being reprinted Nixon strips, but this time the two-page stories from 1998 onwards were used.

In October 2010, new single page strips of Ivy started appearing in the Beano drawn by Diego Jourdan Pereira. Most of the title banners consisted of parodies of famous films such as Rocky and Fight Club and a tagline was introduced; Be thankful she's not your little sister. However, this only lasted until February 2011, as a change of editor at the Beano saw Ivy get dropped. Although a few of Diego Jourdan's strips appeared after this point, they were simply stockpiled strips which had yet to be used.

In the 2008 and 2009 Beano Annuals, her strip was drawn by Steve Horrocks, in the 2011 edition she was drawn by Dave Eastbury, the Ball Boy artist, and in the 2012 edition she was drawn by Laura Howell.

In August 2014, Ivy returned, drawn by Lew Stringer, with another series by Stringer appearing in 2017.

== Personality traits ==
Ivy can be compared to that of an average toddler in that she is extremely quick to anger and is prone to pulling temper tantrums when things are not quite going her way. She can at times be purposefully malicious, for example stamping on her father's toes but most of the time it appears much of her deeds are all done by some fun which has gone out of hand. She has been seen to have a thirst to prove herself, for example, her introductory strip in which she challenges Dennis the Menace to a fight. She seems to have a fairly strong friendship with Dennis' younger sister Bea and is on talking terms with Minnie the Minx and Toots. A Diego Jourdan strip revealed Ivy has a love for horror films as she is watching Scream on her living room television.

== Physical appearance ==
Ivy sports two pigtails on her jet-black messy hair and a single tooth in her mouth. Her usual apparel mainly consists of a yellow fleece jumper under red dungarees with blue play shoes. However, she has occasionally worn blue dungarees with a red fleece jumper. She appears short and stocky but in fact holds rather a lot of strength for someone so young.

== In other media ==
=== Television ===
- Ivy appeared alongside other Beano stars in the straight-to-DVD release of The Beano Videostars. She enters the red carpet via space hopper. She was voiced by Alex Patterson.

=== Theme park ===
- Pictures of Ivy were posted all around Beanoland in Chessington World of Adventures before it was changed into Wild Asia in 2009.

=== Other comics ===
- A girl similar to Ivy appeared in a Dave the Squirrel strip in a 2011 edition of The Dandy. However, due to her mother looking different and the location change (The Dandy takes place in Dandytown rather than Beanotown) it is assumed by most to simply be a small reference by illustrator Andy Fanton.
