= The Beano Videostars =

- Directed by: Terry Ward
- Written by: Richard Everett; Terry Ward
- Based on: The Beano
- Produced by: Terry Ward; Darren Kinnersley-Hill
- Starring: Jonathan Kydd; Gary Martin; Alex Patterson; Mark Pickard; Enn Reitel; Kate Robbins; Susan Sheridan; Jill Shilling; Nicola Stapleton
- Music by: Mark London; Francis Haines
- Production companies: Flicks Films Ltd; D.C. Thomson & Co.
- Distributed by: PolyGram Video
- Release date: 17 October 1994
- Running time: 54 minutes
- Country: United Kingdom
- Language: English

The Beano Videostars is a direct-to-video animated film based on The Beano, originally released on VHS on 17 October 1994 and also broadcast as a television special on ITV. The video is a sequel to The Beano Video, and features an expanded cast of characters, including Dennis the Menace and Gnasher, Minnie the Minx, the Bash Street Kids, Billy Whizz, the Three Bears, and Ivy the Terrible. It was produced and directed by Terry Ward at Flicks Films Ltd, with voices provided by Susan Sheridan, Kate Robbins, Enn Reitel, Gary Martin and Jonathan Kydd, along with newcomers Alex Patterson, Mark Pickard, Jill Shilling and Nicola Stapleton.

Both videos drew high enough ratings and video sales to kick off the 1996-98 TV series Dennis and Gnasher. The video won an award for Best Special in 1995 and a British Animation Award for Children's Choice Special in 1996, and was re-released on DVD 10 years later in 2004.

== Plot ==
The video begins with a glimpse of the planet Earth. Two signs saying, "Beanoversal Presents" (a parody of Universal Studios), appear circling around the planet. Two aliens notice something happening on their ship's monitor and head towards Earth. The camera zooms on the Earth as spotlights appear. The spotlights come from the theatre, where a presenter from the Beanotown Broadcasting Company announces that it is presenting the world premiere of the new Beano movie, and introduces the characters to the audience. The first to arrive are Dennis the Menace and Gnasher, riding the Menace Mobile. Dennis shoots tomatoes at the presenter. The presenter then welcomes the Bash Street Kids and the Three Bears, who all run over him. They are followed by Minnie the Minx, who parachutes towards the theatre and lands on top of the presenter; and Ivy the Terrible, who appears riding her space hopper and bounces on him; and Billy Whizz, who runs a marathon outside the theatre and strips the presenter to his undergarments by running past him. Just as the presenter is about to say goodbye from the Beanotown Broadcasting Company, the aliens appear, much to his frustration. He starts complaining about his inability to do his job if he is standing in his undergarments with the uninvited aliens, while they teleport to the theatre.

In The Snowman Army, Dennis and Gnasher march with an army of snowmen and play pranks on others, such as freezing the path solid and causing a colonel's soldiers to slip and fall, catapulting the snowmen at Walter the Softy and a park keeper, and covering the soldiers in snow from a roof. This leads to a snowball fight between the menaces and the soldiers, with the soldiers firing their snowballs from their tank.

Next, in Jelly Babies, Minnie recites a poem about jelly babies before using some minxing to get herself some green ones. She replaces a park keeper's hat with a red jelly baby, which attracts some bees. Wearing the hat and seeing a box of jelly babies in Mrs Blenkinsop's bag, she tells Blenkinsop that she has entered a "green-free zone", and that everything that is green wil have to be handed over to her. Blenkinsop dumps her cabbages all over Minnie. Fatty Fudge leaves a hair salon, eating jelly babies. Minnie hears Fatty's mentioning of eating jelly babies, and tells him that eating the green ones will make him go bald, much to his horror. He hands the jelly babies to her and runs off. Minnie celebrates with a dance, but Fatty becomes suspicious of her, asking why she is eating green jelly babies and has not gone bald, followed by Blenkinsop telling her that "green-free zones" do not even exist. Minnie begins running away, and Blenkinsop tells Fatty to jump onto some red quick-setting jelly, which he does. Minnie stops to giggle about how she has gotten away, only to be encased in the quick-setting jelly, to which she says that she does not like red jelly babies. Blenkinsop and Fatty laugh at her as she bounces home.

In The New School, a school inspector visits Bash Street School and is unimpressed with its habits, so the kids are given an improved makeover and sent to the new Bash Street Academy. Plug's plastic surgery wears off, and he is expelled after seeing his classmates' makeover, particularly Danny and Smiffy. When he, Teacher, Headmaster, Olive, Janitor and Winston see the inspector put a nuclear physics disc inside the academy's robot teacher, this gives Plug an idea. They all record a music CD at his uncle Mike's studio. At Bash Street Academy, the robot reprimands Danny for putting his hand up to ask a question and nearly vaporises him with his laser. Plug replaces the robot's maths disc with his CD, rescuing his classmates, who dance and sing "We're the Kids From Bash Street School", all while changing back to their old selves. The robot dances along, and after getting too carried away, he begins malfunctioning. The kids escape before the robot explodes, taking the academy with him and leaving the inspector a homeless street busker.

During the interlude, Billy thinks that his drink is warm, so he asks Fatty to hold it while he leaves the theatre to get some ice. He whizzes to the South Pole and returns with the ice for his drink.

In It's a Dad's Life, Minnie's Dad (here named "George") comes home from work, and Minnie plans to rebegin her unhappy dad's life. She dresses him as a baby, a school pupil, a clown, and the "King of Beanotown", with George calling a plumber his "good man" and a police officer a guard and a peasant. Minnie then meets George's boss, telling him that he has been working to hard and is very ill. Feeling that it is his fault, George's boss asks what he should do, to which Minnie suggests that he give her and George free tickets to the fairground. While riding the roller coaster, Minnie tells her dad to admit that his old life is not so bad, to which George replies that he supposes that it is not.

Afterwards is a little musical interlude, with the song "The Beano Rap". The song combines footage from the previous shorts and future shorts and segments (as well as footage of Gnasher dancing from The Beano Video) with original animation.

Next, in Bag Those Pipes, the Three Bears attempt to break into Hank's store, only to hear the sound of bagpipes. They enter the store, where Hank is playing the bagpipes and introduces himself as "McHank", telling the bears that he is having a "Scottish Day". He then shows them his Scottish food, including sized haggis, shortbread (which he stretches into long bread), Highland brand and scotched eggs, before resuming his bagpipe-playing. Unable to tolerate the bagpipes' dreadful noise, the bears exit the store and put aftershave on a cactus. Pa cuts down the cactus and throws it into the air. It lands on Hank, causing him to drop his bagpipes and run off. The bears decide to nab the bagpipes for themselves, and chase after them.

A series of parody commercials are shown, including Gnosher, Ma's Porridge, Dad, Rasher, and a compilation CD named Party Sounds from Beano Town.

In On Safari, Ivy puts her toy animals in her wagon and takes them outside to free them, which leads to chaos: Ally the Alligator is thrown down a slide in the swimming pool, scaring the poolgoers inside; Charlie Cheetah is pushed down the pavement in roller skates, knocking some pedestrians over; Trevor Tarantula is sent bouncing down a hill into the house of an opera singer; Gertie Gorilla is lifted up to a tree branch and falls on a park keeper when he nails a "No Bikes Allowed" sign to the tree, and elephants are tied to an old lady, a police officer, and a motorcyclist. When Ivy returns home, everyone complains to her parents about the animals. Ivy tries sneaking past her parents, disguised as Mrs Teddy Bear, but is caught and sent to bed with no supper. Before falling asleep, she wonders what her animals take to bed with them; her dream reveals them sleeping in the jungle and holding Ivy dolls.

Next, in Flutterby, Gnasher and Gnipper play with a butterfly, only for it to fly over the fence where Walter is skipping and holding a net, upsetting Gnipper. Gnasher attacks Walter and steals his bowtie, which Gnipper wears on his nose as if it were an actual butterfly.

Finally, in Dennis Meets His Match, Dennis and Gnasher are sitting outside their front door, moping because it is a nice spring day and love is blind in Beanotown, with the cats and birds being lovesick for each other. Walter arrives in a happy mood and tells Dennis that nothing can upset him today. The menaces try to prove him wrong by squirting him with the garden hose. However, Walter just laughs annoyingly, simply saying that a mere sprinkling of light summer rain poured down. The menaces try even harder to spoil his mood by making a loud din with their instruments. Walter just sings happily, and asks if he heard a pindrop somewhere. The menaces re-enter the garden shed as Walter says hello to everything that he sees. Dennis is angered even more by this and gets out his remote control jet plane, which drops eggs and flour onto Walter. He and Gnasher expect Walter to cry by now, but as the flour disappears, Walter is still smiling, and proves himself right; Dennis cannot possibly hurt him today, because he is in love.

A young tomboy named Cynthia then arrives, pushing her doll's pram. Walter is holding a bouquet of daffodils as Cynthia stops by and reveals that she has been Beanotown Beauty Queen for three years running. He then coldly rejects her for her cuddly dolly. Enraged, Cynthia stamps on Walter's foot, causing him to throw the dolly in the air. It lands in Cynthia's arms, and she uses it to whack Walter, launching him into the air. Dennis uses a trampoline as the final step in the plan to bounce Walter out of sight. He congratulates Cynthia over her "brilliant" menacing work. Meanwhile, Dennis' school teacher is admiring the prize marrow that he grew in his garden, and hopes to win first prize in the local competition, when suddenly, Walter crash lands onto the marrow, squashing it. The teacher blows his top at Walter over the obliterated marrow and angrily fires him as Teacher's Pet. Upon being fired, Walter begins to cry. Dennis and Cynthia begin celebrating Walter's defeat, when suddenly, Dennis endures his first on-screen kiss. Realising this, he screams in horror, and Gnasher howls. They then stop the film, jump out of it, and enter the projection room, where they cut the kissing scene out (Gnasher eats the strip) so it never happened. Just as Cynthia is about to kiss Dennis, he refuses, and the menaces decide to run away, while Cynthia watches.

After the end credits, Dennis and Gnasher escape the theatre and find the two aliens inside their UFO. Dennis bangs on the window, telling them to get him away from Cynthia. The aliens accept, and the UFO flies off into outer space as Cynthia begins crying. Dennis and Gnasher are relieved to have escaped Cynthia. However, to their horror, a female alien has stowed away on the UFO and is in love with Dennis, and wants to kiss him. Dennis screams again.

The scene fades to the theatre, where Olive is cleaning up after everyone has left. She breaks the fourth wall, reminding the viewers to rewind the tape if they want to watch the video again, before resuming work and muttering to herself, as "The End" appears on the screen and the curtains close.

== Episodes and segments ==
1. Dennis and Gnasher: The Snowman Army
2. Minnie the Minx: Jelly Babies
3. The Bash Street Kids: The New School
4. Minnie the Minx: It's a Dad's Life
5. Song: "The Beano Rap"
6. The Three Bears: Bag Those Pipes
7. Commercials: Gnosher, Ma's Porridge, Dad, Rasher, Party Sounds from Beano Town (includes "U & Me" by Cappella, "House of Love" by East 17, "Shoop" by Salt-N-Pepa, and "The Size of a Cow" by The Wonder Stuff)
8. Ivy the Terrible: On Safari
9. Gnipper: Flutterby
10. Dennis and Gnasher: Dennis Meets His Match
11. End Credits: "The Beano Videostars"

== Voice cast ==
- Mark Pickard as Dennis the Menace
- Gary Martin as Gnasher, Gnipper, Rasher, Park Keeper #1, Gnosher Narrator, Birds, Cats, Fatty Fudge, Park Keeper #2, Plumber, Fatty, Plug, Spotty, Wilfrid, 'Erbert, Janitor, Woodworm, Uncle Mike, Billy Whizz, Pedestrian #1, Pedestrian #3, Poolgoer #1, Poolgoer #4, Ivy's Toys and Party Sounds from Beano Town Narrator
- Jonathan Kydd as Walter the Softy (The Snowman Army, Dad commercial and Party Sounds from Beano Town commercial), Colonel, Dennis' Teacher, Minnie's Dad, Minnie's Dad's Boss, Sidney, Teacher, Headmaster, School Inspector, Horse Race Announcer, Penguin, Monkey #1, Ivy's Dad, Monkey #2, Park Keeper #3, Poolgoer #5, Police Officer #2 and Presenter
- Enn Reitel as Walter the Softy (Flutterby and Dennis Meets His Match), Aliens, Female Alien, Police Officer #1, Winston, Doctor, Hairdresser, Robot, Pa Bear, Ted Bear, Hank, Chicken, Chick, Ma's Porridge Narrator, Pedestrian #2, Poolgoer #3 and Child
- Susan Sheridan as Dennis' Mum, Cynthia, Walter's Mum, Dad Singers, Newsreader, Mrs Ramsbottom, Baby #1, Mrs Blenkinsop, Danny, Smiffy, Toots, Olive, Toots' Mum, Baby #2, Ma Bear, Pedestrian #4 and Poolgoer #2
- Nicola Stapleton as Minnie the Minx
- Kate Robbins as Nurse
- Alex Patterson as Ivy the Terrible
- Jill Shilling as Opera Singer in Bath

== Credits ==
- Tracers and Painters: Karin Adams, Joe Beheit, Christine Courtney, Galina Crosby, Marianne Goldner, Alan Henry, Susan Mansfield, Russel Murch, Gabriella Muriel, Sue Plummer, Sue Rayment, Andy Turner
- Trace and Paint Co-Ordinator: Chris Rayment
- Storyboards/Layouts: Andy Dixon, Neil Graham, Janet Nunn, Terry Ward
- Background Artists: Roberta Fino, Ian Henderson
- Animators: Richard Eayrs, Alan Green, Keith Grieg, Dennis Hunt, Sarah Keogh, Bill Lee, Pierson Lippard, Roger Lougher, David McFall, Roger McIntosh, Andy McPherson, Keiko Masudo, Janet Nunn, Colin Pinchbeck, Paul Stone, Tony Walters, Robert J. West
- Checkers: Andy Dixon, Russel Murch
- Film Editing: Ken Morgan
- Rostrum Camera: Filmfex
- Post Production at AV Department:
- Dubbing Mixer: Nigel Edwards
- Post Production Co-Ordinator: Tania Ward
- Voice Over Artists: Jonathan Kydd, Gary Martin, Alex Patterson, Mark Pickard, Enn Reitel, Kate Robbins, Susan Sheridan, Jill Shilling, Nicola Stapleton
- Music and Songs: Mark London, Francis Haines
- Script: Richard Everett, Terry Ward
- Production Co-Ordinator: Andy Dixon
- Director/Producer: Terry Ward
- Polygram Executive Producer: Darren Kinnersley-Hill
- The End
- Produced by Flicks Films Ltd for D.C. Thomson & Co. Limited and PolyGram Video

== Broadcast history ==
=== United Kingdom ===
- ITV (1994)
