= Diego Jourdan =

Uruguayan comics artist

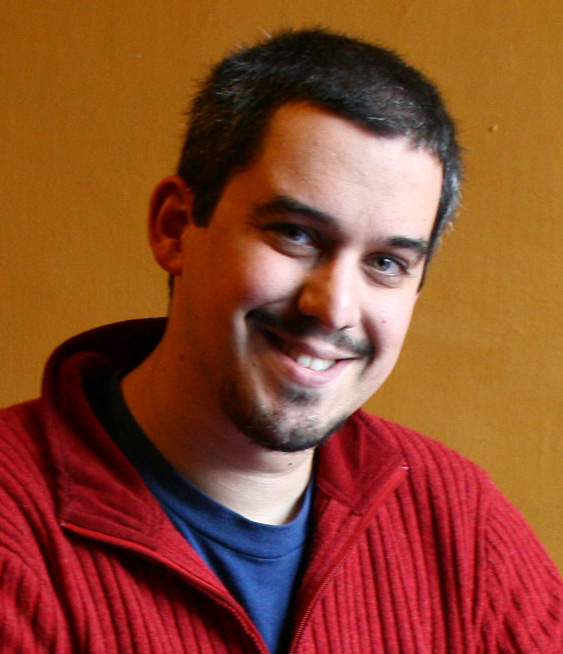
- Diego Jourdan Pereira
- Born: Diego Jourdan Pereira; 21 October 1977 (age 49) Montevideo, Uruguay
- Areas: Author (Writer, puzzle maker, translator, illustrator, colorist, cartoonist)
- Notable works: Astonishing Bathroom Reader, 5-Minute Jesus Stories, Ivy the Terrible, Oor Wullie
- Awards: Premio Morosoli (2014)

Diego Jourdan Pereira (credited in the comics as Diego Jourdan) is a Uruguayan author of trade books for general audiences, who resides in Santiago, Chile.

== Life ==
Born in Montevideo, Uruguay, Jourdan Pereira moved to Santiago de Chile, Chile, in 1991, where he has lived since.

== Career ==
Jourdan Pereira studied Graphic Design at Universidad del Pacifico in Chile and Computer Typesetting and Design at the Fashion Institute of Technology in New York, and worked mainly as a comic-book artist for twenty years, the first ten of which he spent illustrating licensed properties such as Teenage Mutant Ninja Turtles, G.I. Joe, Transformers: Animated, Astro Boy, Digger & Friends, Ghostbusters, and Disney/Pixar characters for American publishers like IDW Publishing, Mirage Studios, and Boom Studios; before crossing the Atlantic to Scotland's DC Thomson where he tackled Ivy the Terrible, Lego City, and Pie Face comics for the weekly The Beano, Snooty & Scamp (Lord & Lauser) at Wendy, countless illustrations for WWE Kids Magazine, and was finally chosen as a Peter Davidson fill-in artist on The Sunday Post Fun Section comic-strips (which include Oor Wullie, The Broons, and Wee Harry).

He also delved into vintage comic-book restoration and re-coloring, starting out with The Purple Smurfs (Papercutz), online Last Kiss cartoon panels, DC Comics’ Justice League International Omnibus, and collections dedicated to Uruguayan cartoonists Carlos María Federici (Detective Intergaláctico), Geoffrey "Fola" Foladori (El hombre que fue una biblioteca), and Emilio Cortinas (Hazañas de un viajero del tiempo), all published by Uruguayan comics convention Montevideo Comics.

Between 2014 and 2016, he dedicated himself to woodcut printmaking, taking part in Japan's MI Lab Residency program, designed to teach mokuhanga (Japanese water-based woodblock printmaking technique) to foreign artists. Four of his biblical woodcut prints were also included in the book Revealed: A Storybook Bible for Grown-ups, alongside works by Albrecht Dürer, Rembrandt van Rijn, Franz Marc, and Eric Gill among many others. Commercially, he applied his printmaking expertise to the development of adult coloring books, mainly for Dover Publications in the USA.

From 2017 onward Jourdan Pereira chose to pursue a career as a nonfiction author, debuting as an English-language writer with the publication of his Astonishing Bathroom Reader in 2020, and its 2021 Bizarre Bathroom Reader sequel.

In September, 2021, two Spanish language titles translated by Jourdan, Sonic: El destino del Dr. Eggman, and Locke & Key: Bienvenidos a Lovecraft, were released by IDW Publishing. Another of Jourdan Periera's translations, Voices That Count, was published in June 2022.

The end of 2021 saw his return to adult coloring books with the publication of his Masterpixels books.

In 2022, Jourdan Pereira began to abridge classics for the "5-Minute" line of Sky Pony Press' children's storybooks, including 5-Minute Classic Animal Stories, an adaptation of classic fables and tales, and 5-Minute Jesus Stories. He also joined The World Almanac as a puzzle constructor with The World Almanac Book of Crosswords, and its wordsearch annuals.

Early in 2023, he became a contributing writer at Writer's Digest. In October, his translation of Horacio Quiroga's Tales of Love, Madness, and Death was also announced by London-based publisher Renard Press.

== Awards and recognition ==
- In January 2009, Jourdan was accepted as a regular member of the National Cartoonists Society.
- In 2011, Jourdan's short comic Verdes, with Argentinian writer Javier Hildebrandt, won a contest in the Italian magazine Mono, and was published in issue 10 of said magazine.
- On 6 December 2014, Jourdan was awarded the Morosoli Award (silver medal, arts category), for his contribution to Uruguayan culture.
- In February 2021, Jourdan's Bible Power Puzzles volume won the Illumination Book Awards bronze medal in the Keepsake/Gift/Specialty category.
- On July 9, 2021, his children's activity book Giant Book of Games and Puzzles for Smart Kids won Second Place at Story Monster's Purple Dragonfly Book Awards Contest.

== Bibliography ==
=== Author/writer ===
- Creative Haven American Landscapes (2015)
- Creative Haven Wildlife (2015)
- Creative Haven Dogs (2016)
- Creative Haven Grumpy Cat Hates Coloring (2016)
- Creative Haven Grumpy Cat vs. The World (2016)
- Al servicio del cómic internacional (2016)
- ¡Gana dinero ilustrando! (2017)
- Introducción al cómic internacional (2017)
- Giant Book of Games and Puzzles for Smart Kids (2020)
- The Big Book of Brain-Boosting Puzzles (2020)
- Elmo on The Move: At the Airport (2020)
- Elmo on The Move: At the Farm (2020)
- Bible Power Puzzles (2020)
- Astonishing Bathroom Reader (2020)
- The Giant Sight Word Workbook (2021)
- The Big Book of Brain Boosting Pix-Cross Puzzles (2021)
- Masterpixels: Amazing Wildlife (2021)
- Masterpixels: Incredible Sea Life (2021)
- Bizarre Bathroom Reader (2021)
- The World Almanac Book of Crosswords (2022)
- 5-Minute Classic Animal Stories (2022)
- 5-Minute Jesus Stories (2023)
- The World Almanac 2024 Word Search (2023)
- The World Almanac 2025 Word Search (2024)
- The Gigantic Activity Book for Smart Kids (Smart Kids by American Mensa) (2025)
- 5-Minute Bible Stories: Faith in Action (2027)

=== Translator ===
- Sonic: El destino del Dr. Eggman (2021)
- Locke & Key: Bienvenidos a Lovecraft (2021)
- Voices That Count (2022)
- Tales of Love, Madness & Death (2025)
- Gypsy Ballads (2025)
- Soma (2025)
- Planeta (2025)
- Espada: The Will of the Blade (2025)
- El Extraño Mundo de Jack de Tim Burton: Espejo de Luna (2026)
- Barbie y Teresa: La Receta Secreta (2026)

=== Artist/illustrator/colorist ===
- El Mercurio (1997-2014)
- Chirality #12 (1998)
- Legend of Lemnear (1999)
- Sicario #1-2 (1997-1998)
- La Ruta de los Arcanos #2 (1999)
- Conozca MAS (2000)
- Digital Webbing Presents #1-2-3 (2002)
- Supernatural Law #33 (2000)
- Supernatural Law Secretary Mavis #4 (2002)
- Leather Jacket Guy #1-2 (2003)
- Fused #2-3-4 (2003)
- K9 Magazine #16-42-65 (2003 - 2004)
- GREAT APE #1 (2003)
- B.A.B.E. Force: Jurassic Trailer Park Prequel/Dr. Chaos' Comic Cornucopia (2003)
- Knights Of The Dinner Table: Everknights #6 (2003)
- Tales of the TMNT #25, 26, 30, 32, 35, 37, 40 (2006 - 2007)
- TMNT: The Official Movie Adaptation (2007)
- TMNT: Fast Forward (2008)
- TRANSFORMERS ANIMATED (2008)
- G.I. Joe: Resolute #1-2-3 (2008)
- Astro Boy The Movie: Official Movie Prequel #1-2-3-4 (2008)
- Digger & Friends #1-2-3-4 (2009)
- G.I. Joe Combat Heroes: We Are G.I. Joe (2009)
- Ghostbusters: Past, Present And Future (2009)
- Toy Story #7 (2010)
- Darkwing Duck #6 and #8 (2010)
- Uncle Scrooge #397-398-399 (2010)
- MAD Magazine (Australia) (2010-2012)
- The Beano: Ivy the Terrible, Lego City, Pie-Face (2010-2015)
- Wendy: Snoot & Scamp in Wendy (2010-2011)
- WWE Kids Magazine (2011-2020)
- Moshi Monsters Magazine (2011)
- Glow-in-the-dark Zombie Sticker Paper Doll (2014)
- Glow-in-the-dark Fairy Princess Sticker Paper Doll (2014)
- Crononautas (2014)
- Creative Haven American Landscapes (2015)
- Creative Haven Wildlife (2015)
- Creative Haven Dogs (2016)
- Creative Haven Grumpy Cat Hates Coloring (2016)
- Creative Haven Grumpy Cat vs. The World (2016)
- Donald Duck #44 (2016)
- Donald Duck #39 (2017)
- Go-bots #1 (2018)
- My Little Pony: Friendship is Magic #76 (2019)
- Donald Duck #37 (2019)
- The Great Gatsby Deluxe Illustrated Edition (2021)
- Masterpixels: Amazing Wildlife (2021)
- Masterpixels: Incredible Sea Life (2021)
- Winnie the Pooh: The Classic Edition (2022)
- La Torre de Papel (2022)
- The Sustainability Adventures of Keera, Kanay & Ra (2023)
- 5-Minute Jesus Stories (2023)
- The House at Pooh Corner: The Classic Edition (2024)
- Now We Are Six (2025)
- Jim Henson's Labyrinth: The Official Coloring Book (2026)
