= Oor Wullie =

Scottish comic strip

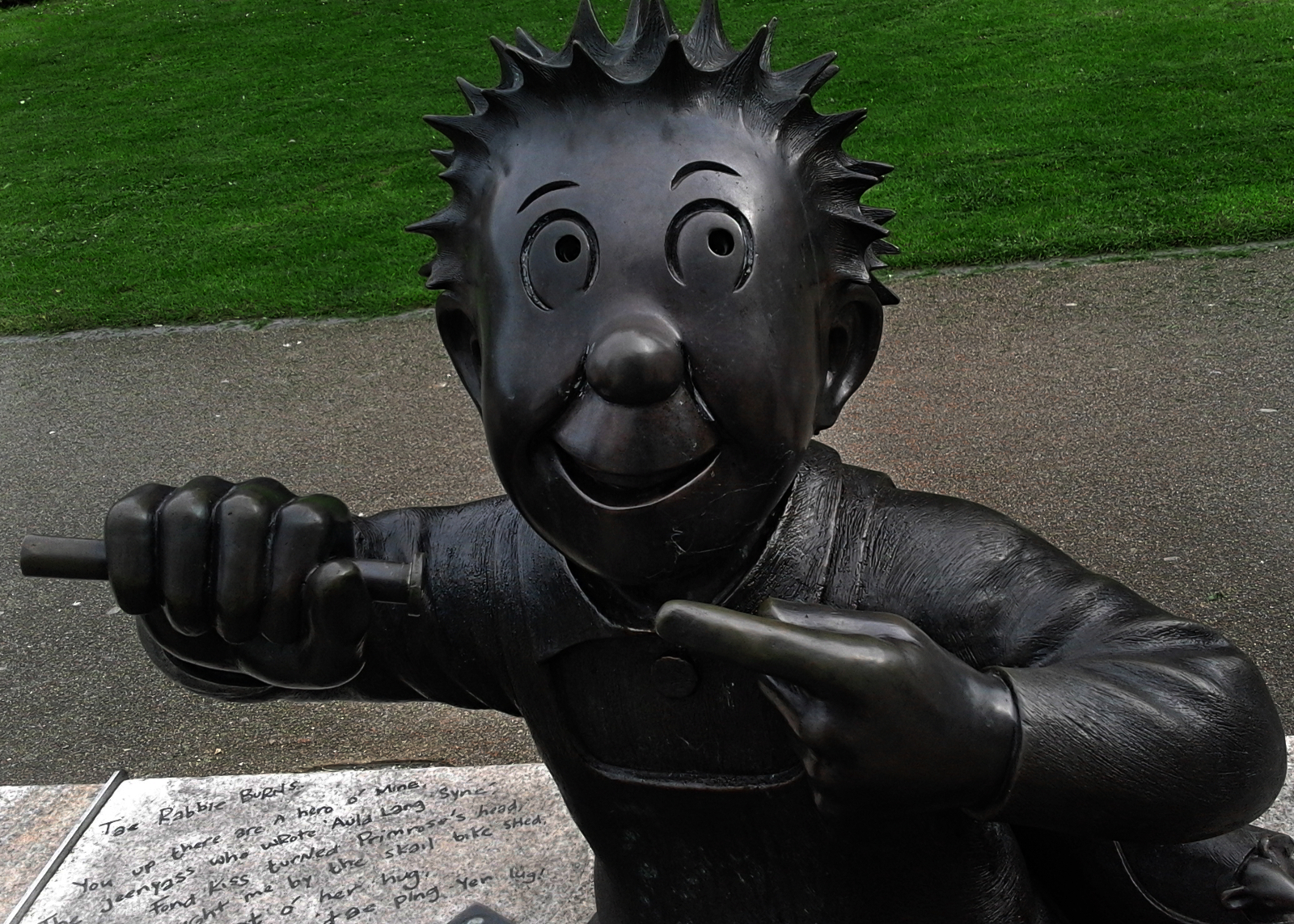
- Oor Wullie statue in Dundee
- Author: R.D. Low
- Launch date: 8 March 1936
- Publisher: DC Thomson
- Original language: Scots

Oor Wullie (English: Our Willie) is a Scottish comic strip published in the D.C. Thomson newspaper The Sunday Post. It features a character called Wullie; Wullie is a Scots nickname for boys named William, equivalent to Willie. His trademarks are spiky hair, dungarees and an upturned bucket, which he uses as a seat: most strips since early 1937 begin and end with a single panel of Wullie sitting on his bucket. The earliest strips, with little dialogue, ended with Wullie complaining (e.g., "I nivver get ony fun roond here!"). The artistic style settled down by 1940 and has changed little since. A frequent tagline reads, "Oor Wullie! Your Wullie! A'body's Wullie!" (Our Willie! Your Willie! Everybody's Willie!).

Created by Thomson editor R. D. Low and drawn by cartoonist Dudley D. Watkins, the strip first appeared on 8 March 1936. Watkins continued to draw Oor Wullie until his death in 1969, after which the Post recycled his work into the 1970s. New strips were eventually commissioned from Tom Lavery, followed by Peter Davidson and Robert Nixon. Ken H. Harrison drew the strip from 1989 until 1997, when Davidson resumed duties. Between January 2005 and 2006, storylines were written by broadcaster Tom Morton from his home in Shetland, and subsequently they were written by Dave Donaldson, managing director of Thomson's comics division. Former Dandy editor Morris Heggie took over as editor and main writer on Donaldson's departure, and continued to write the strips until 2022. In more recent years writers have included Georgia Battle, Kate Dewar, Gerard Dignan, Craig Ferguson, Hector Mac, Daniel McGachey, and others, with writer and artist credits now appearing alongside the strips in The Sunday Post.

Between 2016 and 2017, artist Diego Jourdan Pereira filled in for Peter Davidson on Wullie, The Broons and Wee Harry. Jourdan Pereira also provided illustrations for the 2017 Annual and official merchandising.

Since Peter Davidson's retirement, Oor Wullie has been drawn by Mike Donaldson, who also took over art duties on The Broons and wee Harry strips, as well as PC Murdoch Mysteries on the retirement of Ken Harrison in 2023. Occasional strips have been drawn by Gary Welsh.

== Characters and story ==
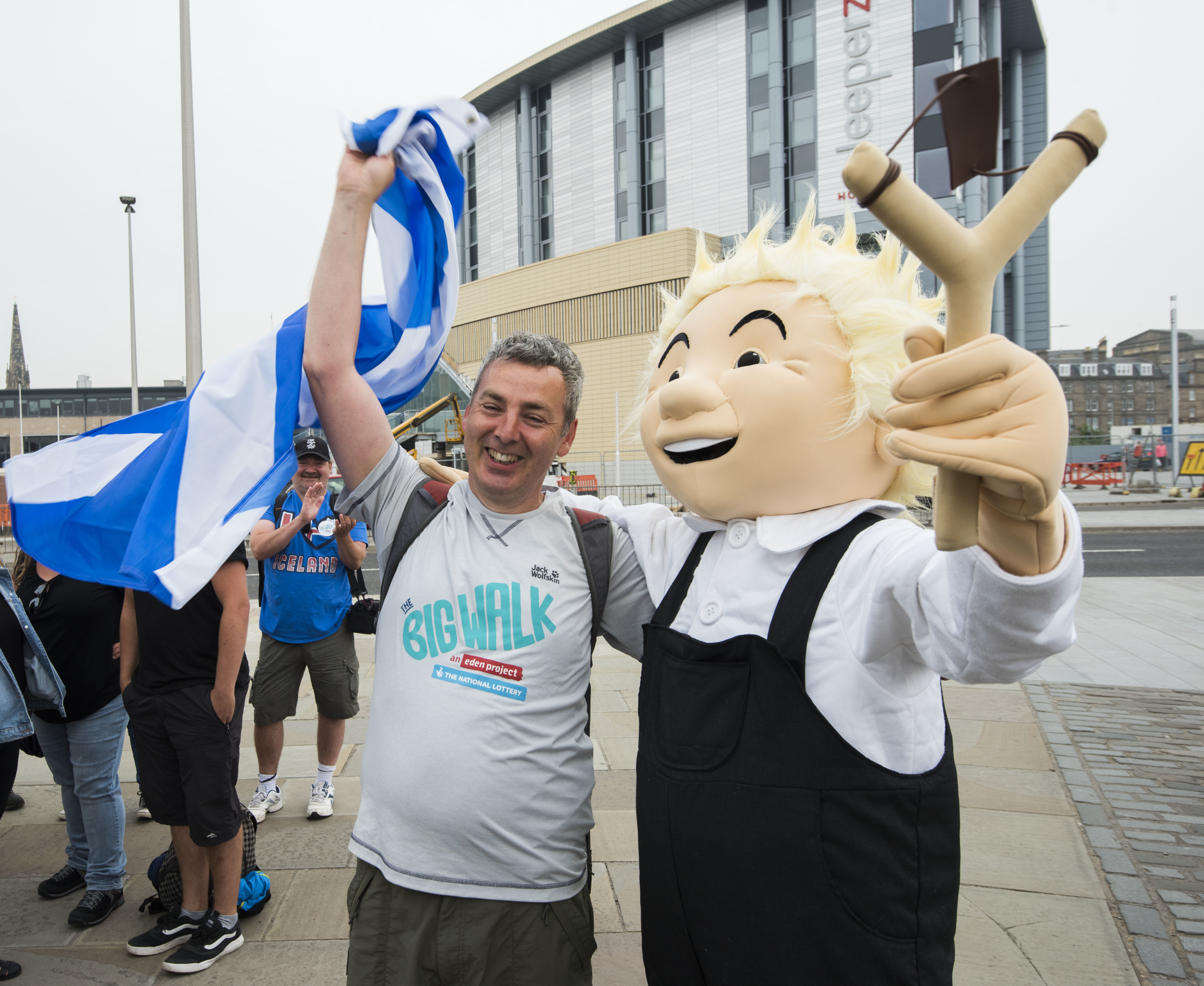
An Oor Wullie costume as part of The Big Walk

Although Wullie's hometown was unnamed in the original Watkins strips, it has been called Auchenshoogle since the late 1990s.

Wullie's gang consists of himself, Fat Bob, Wee Eck and Soapy Soutar. Wullie is the self-proclaimed leader, a position which is frequently disputed by the others. In early strips, the gang met in a wooden shed - usually located in the garden at Wullie's house. He also owns a pet mouse named Jeemy (Scots for 'Jimmy').

Wullie and his friends roam the streets of his town, though he is sometimes depicted at school, which he finds confining. Praise from his teacher, who addresses him as "William", is rare and acutely embarrassing. His adventures often consist of unrealistic get-rich-quick schemes that lead to mischief, to the despair of his parents, Ma and Pa. Wullie's Pa is called "Tam"; the only reference to this is in a strip from the 1960s during a conversation between Pa and the local policeman, Wullie's arch-nemesis, P.C. Murdoch.

Famous people such as Nicola Sturgeon, Ewan McGregor, Andy Murray and Amy Macdonald have appeared in the strip over the years. In December 2016, Nicola Sturgeon featured Oor Wullie on a Christmas card, with the original illustration being auctioned for charity.

When The Topper launched in 1953, Oor Wullie appeared in the masthead, although not as a story in the comic. He often appeared sitting on his bucket, though other poses were used as well. The pose on Topper No. 1 had him wearing a top hat. He had the top hat in one hand and the other hand pointing at the Topper logo.

== Annuals ==
Starting in 1940, the Oor Wullie strips also appeared in the form of a Christmas annual which alternated every second year with The Broons, another D. C. Thomson product. (No annuals were published between 1943 and 1946.) Pre-1966 annuals were undated.

A facsimile of the first The Broons annual was released on 25 November 2006 and of the first Oor Wullie annual the following year, celebrating the 70th anniversaries of the strips.

Following the 80th anniversary in 2016, additional annuals of Oor Wullie were issued for 2016 and 2018, breaking from the biennial pattern.

Since 1996—the 60th anniversary of the strip—D.C. Thomson has also published a series of compilation books featuring The Broons and Oor Wullie on alternate pages.

The early stories are often recycled in current annuals. An example being the "twin cousin" story in the 2018 annual being first seen in the fifties.

== Bucket Trails ==
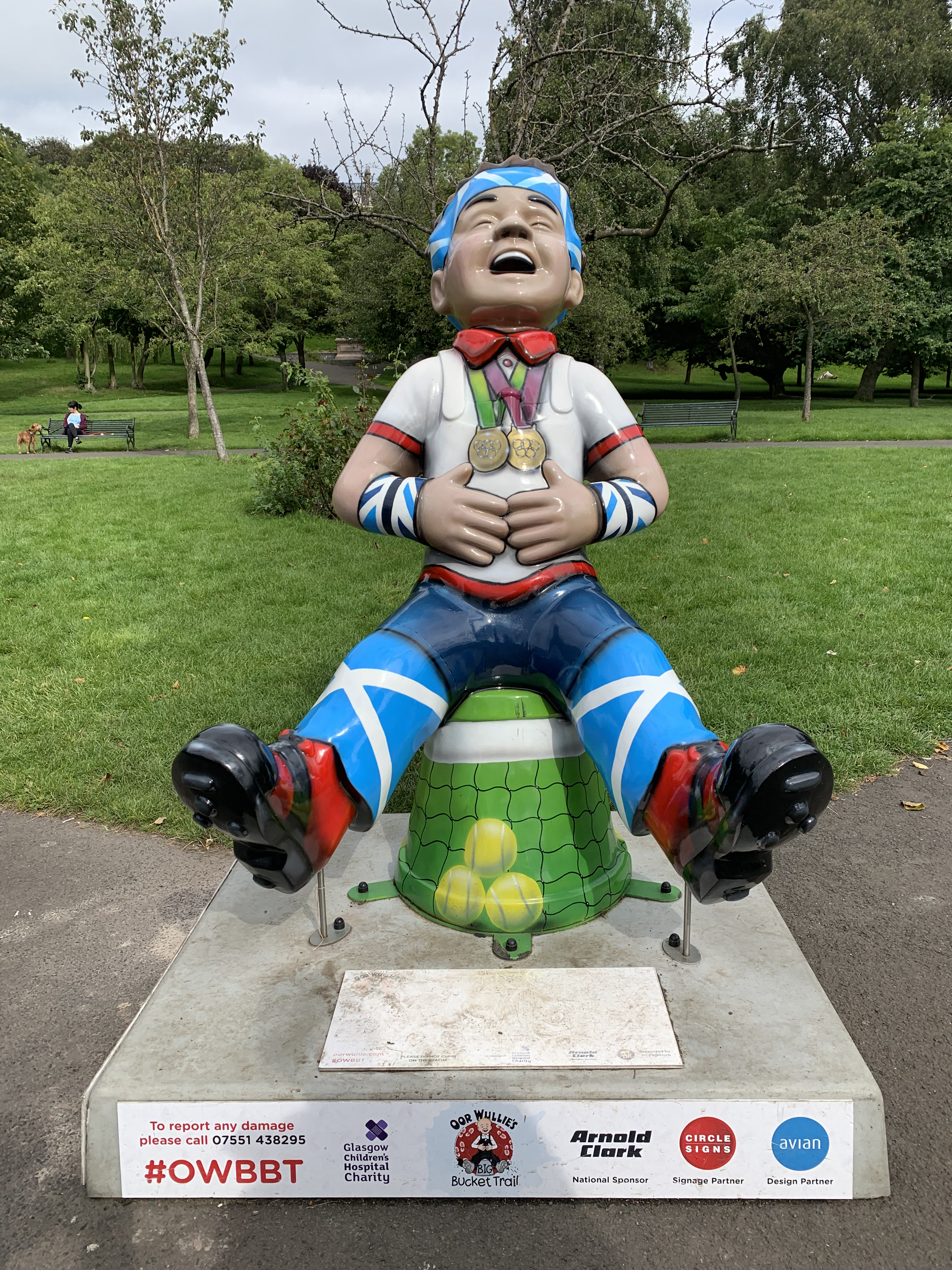
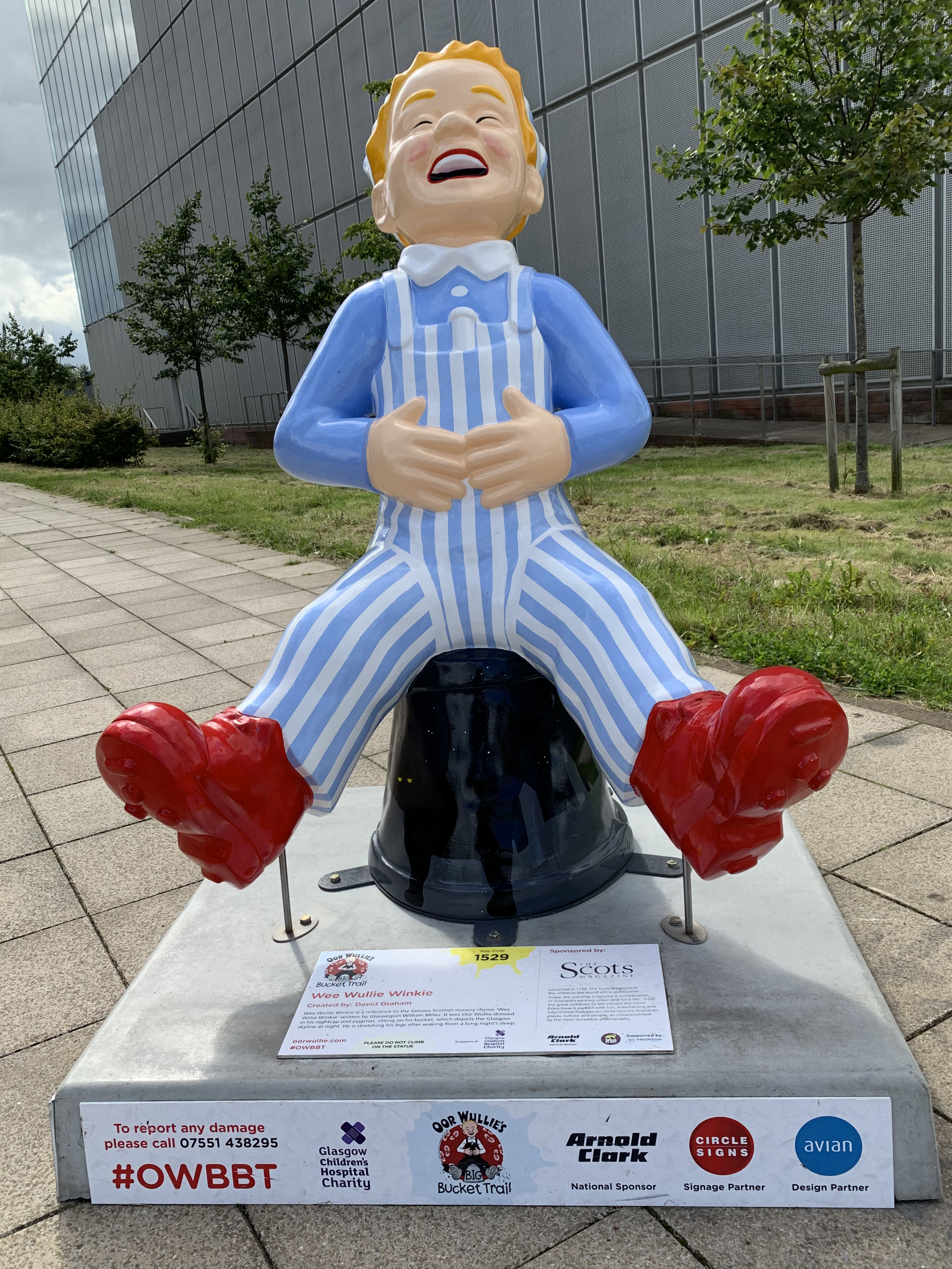
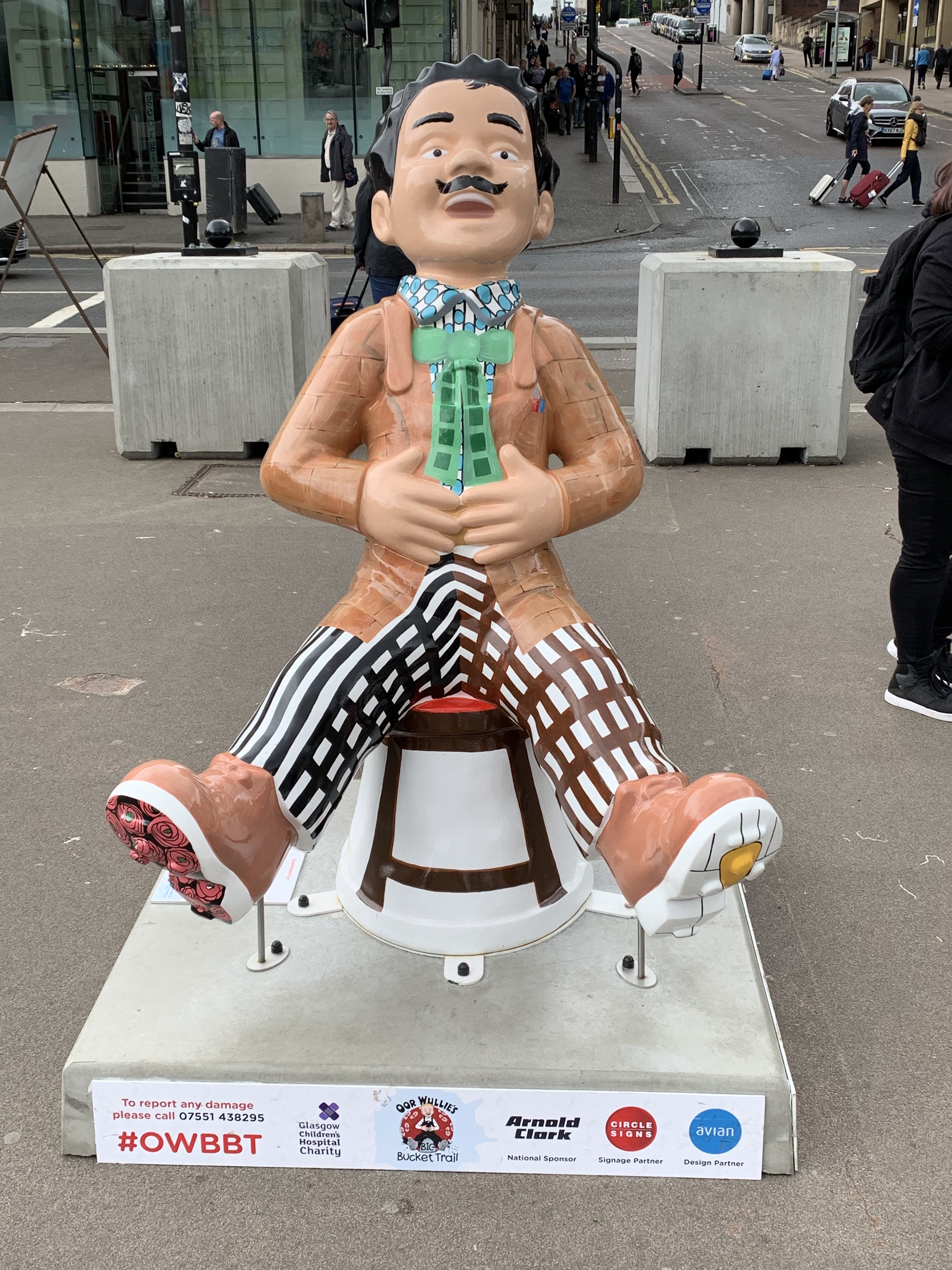
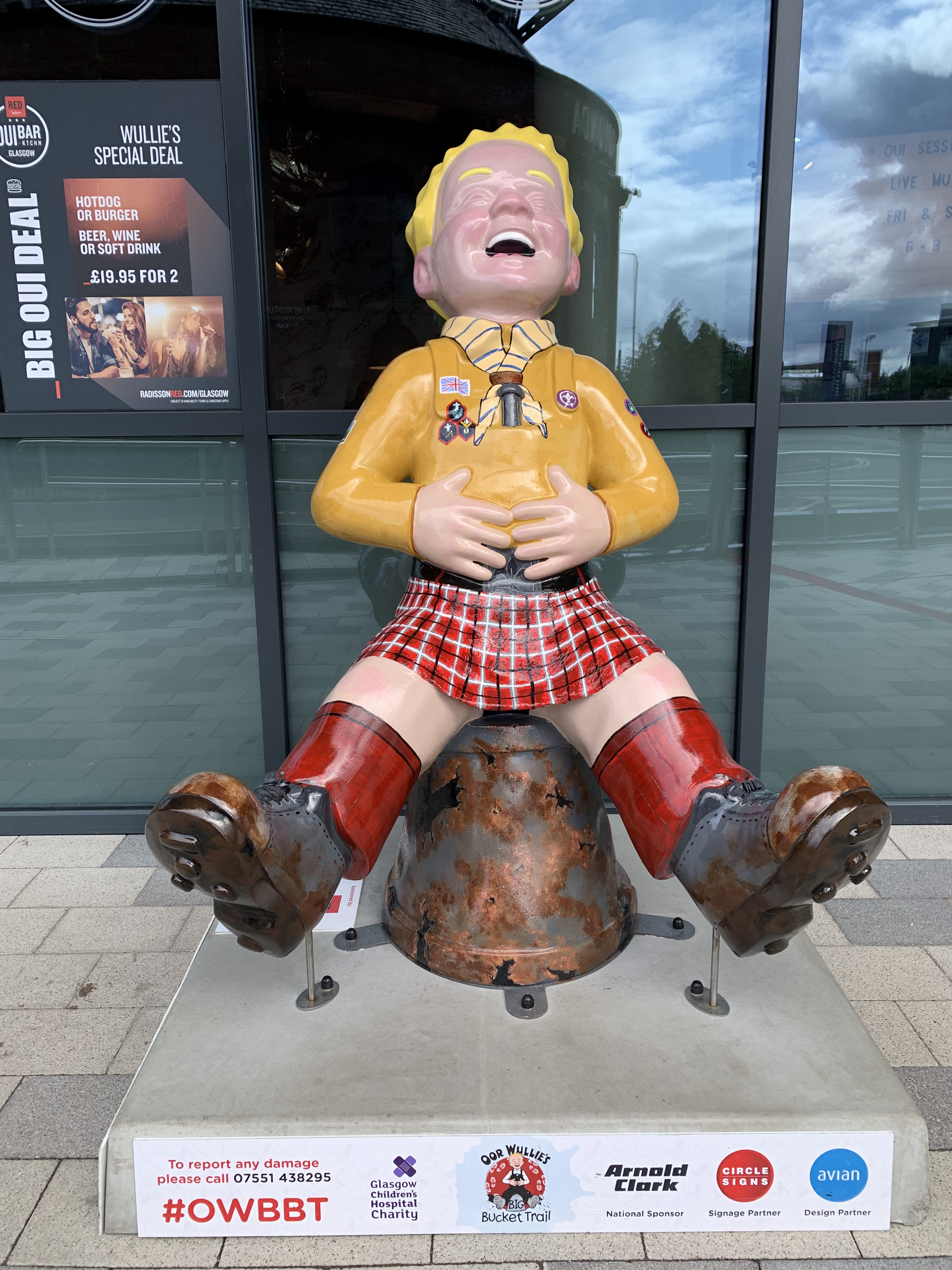
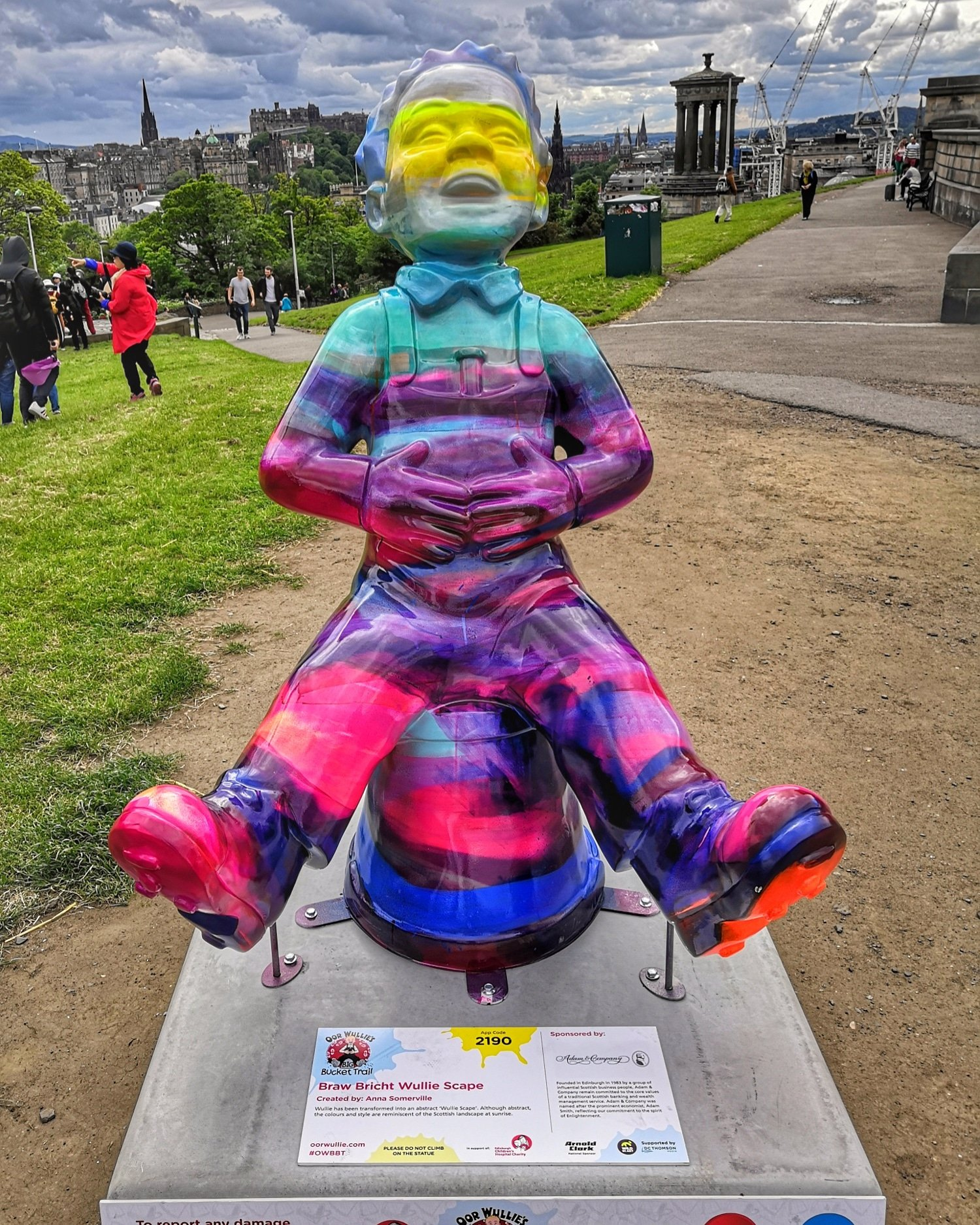
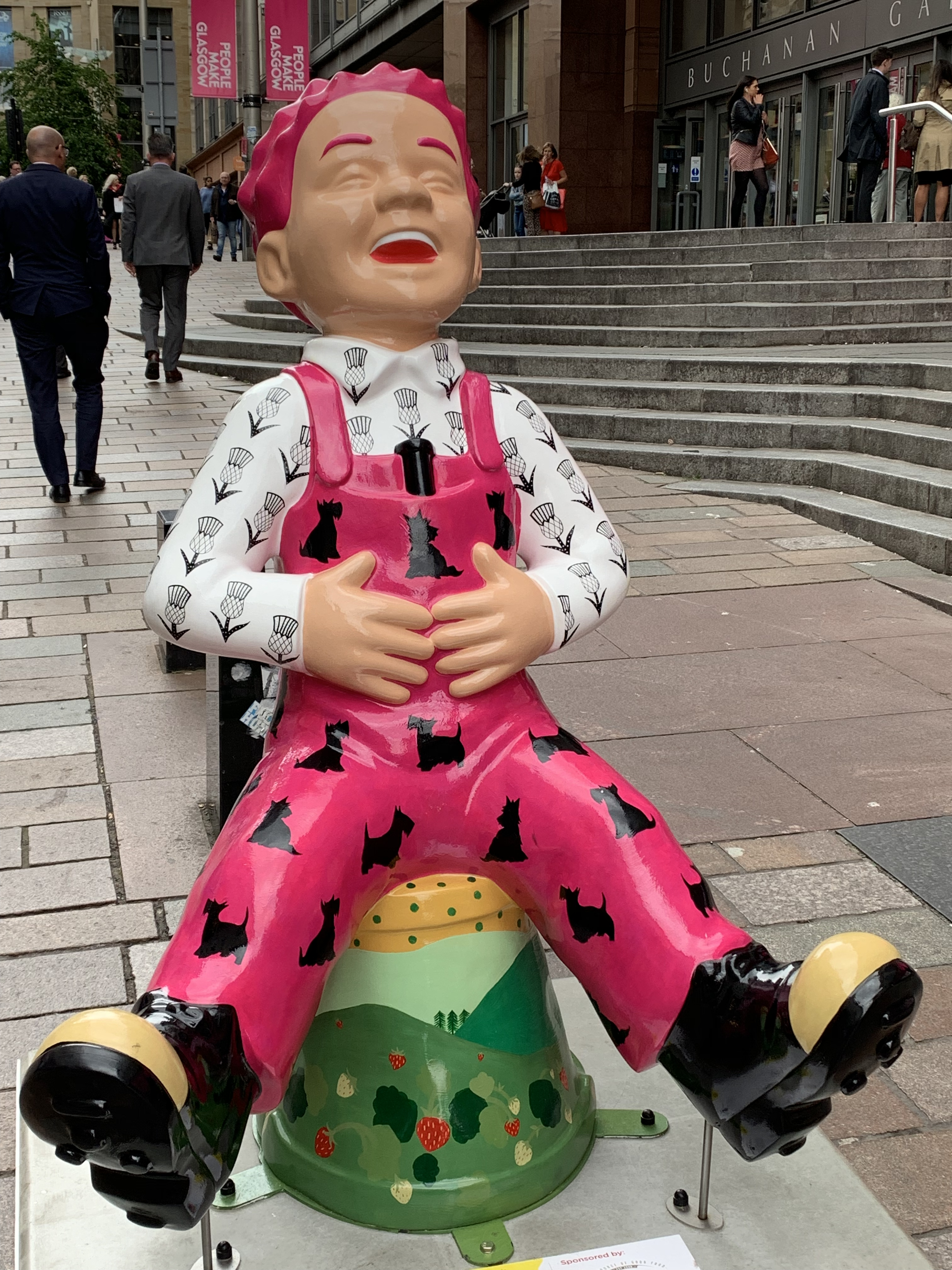
Oor Wullie sculptures

In celebration of Oor Wullie's 80th anniversary in 2016, he was the subject of a public art project when 55 decorated five-foot (1.5-metre) sculptures of him were placed around Dundee and its environs with another 13 touring round Scotland over an eight-week period. The Bucket Trail was the largest mass public art project to have taken place in Scotland. The project ran from 27 June for two months, with the sculptures being auctioned in September for £883,000, for a new pediatric surgical suite at Tayside Children's Hospital. In 2019 Oor Wullie's BIG Bucket Trail 2019 was launched with 200 artistic interpretations of the figure at locations in cities across Scotland, raising money for Edinburgh Children's Hospital, Glasgow Children's Hospital and the Archie Foundation.

== See also ==
- The Broons
- List of DC Thomson publications
- Scots language
- The Sunday Post
