= Dennis the Menace and Gnasher =

Scottish comic strip

- Comic strip character(s) from The Beano
- Dennis with his pet dog Gnasher

Publication information
- Stars in: Dennis the Menace; Bringing Up Dennis (issues 801–808)
- Other names: Dennis the Menace and Gnasher; Dennis and Gnasher
- Creator(s): George Moonie (editor); David Law (artist); Ian Chisholm
- Other contributors: David Sutherland; David Parkins; Nigel Auchterlounie; Nigel Parkinson; James (Jimmy) Hansen; Tom Paterson
- Current/last artist: Nigel Parkinson
- First appearance: Issue 452 (12 March 1951 (dated 17 March 1951) (as Dennis the Menace))
- Also appeared in: The Beano Annual; Minnie the Minx, Roger the Dodger, The Bash Street Kids, Dennis the Menace Annual
- Current status: Ongoing
- Schedule: Weekly
- Spin-offs: Dennis the Menace Annual, Go, Granny, Go!, Rasher, Dennis & Gnasher 1996, Dennis & Gnasher 2009, Bea, Gnasher's Tale, Gnasher and Gnipper

Main Character
- Name: Dennis Menace
- Alias(es): Dennis the Menace
- Family: Dad; Mum; Gnasher (pet); Hermione Makepeace (cousin); Bea (sister); Gnipper (pet); Granny (grandmother)
- Friends: Curly, Pie Face, Rubi and JJ

Characters
- Regular characters: Walter the Softy, Spotty Perkins, Bertie Blenkinsop, Sergeant Slipper, the Colonel, Foo Foo, Angel-Face
- Other characters: Mr. De Testa, Claudius
- Crossover characters: Minnie the Minx, Roger the Dodger, The Bash Street Kids

Dennis the Menace and Gnasher (known globally as Dennis and Gnasher) is a comic strip in the children's comic The Beano, published by DC Thomson, of Dundee in Scotland. The comic stars a boy named Dennis the Menace and his dog, an "Abyssinian wire-haired tripe hound" named Gnasher.

The strip first appeared in issue 452 (dated 17 March 1951) and on sale from 12 March 1951. It is the longest-running strip in the comic. The idea and name of the character emerged when the comic's editor heard a British music hall song with the chorus "I'm Dennis the Menace from Venice". The creation of Dennis in the 1950s had sales of The Beano soar. In issue 1678 (dated 14 September 1974), Dennis the Menace replaced Biffo the Bear on the front cover, and it has been there until issue 3961 (dated 17 November 2018). Coincidentally, on 12 March 1951, another comic strip named Dennis the Menace debuted in the US. As a result of this, the US series has initially been retitled Dennis for British audiences, while the British character's appearances are often titled Dennis and Gnasher outside the United Kingdom. In 2021, Dennis and Gnasher featured on a series of UK postage stamps issued by the Royal Mail to mark 70 years of the character.

Dennis is the archetypal badly behaved schoolboy. The main recurring storyline throughout the years features his campaign of terror against a gang of "softies" (effeminate, well-behaved boys), particularly Walter the Softy. Walter finds himself in unfavourable circumstances on many occasions, although he sometimes gets the last laugh. Author Michael Rosen states, "In most children's books, a bad child gets made good – but the great thing about Dennis is he never gets better".

Dennis the Menace and Gnasher was first drawn by David Law (1951–1971) and David Sutherland (1970–1998). David Parkins took over from 1998 until 2006, although Nigel Parkinson drew most of the strips after 2002, and Jimmy Hansen alternated with him in 2005–06. Tom Paterson drew some second Dennis strips for the comic's rear pages. Barrie Appleby did the artwork for the Beano Superstars series, which, toward the end of its run, resorted mostly to strips based on the TV series. In 2011, he took over as Dennis's main artist. In 2012, Nigel Parkinson was named the sole official Dennis artist. Dennis was returned to his previous appearance and personality. Nigel Auchterlounie began writing for Dennis a month later and gave Dennis (and the other characters) wider personalities. Auchterlounie has proven to be a very popular writer since taking over Dennis. Dennis and Gnasher have remained the mascots of The Beano.

== History ==
=== Creation and concept ===
"The eureka moment arrived in a St Andrews pub while chief sub Ian Chisholm and artist Davey Law were brainstorming. Chisholm grabbed a cigarette packet, sketched a picture of a knobbly-kneed boy with dark spiky hair, and a comic strip legend was born."

— Dennis the Menace at 60, BBC, March 2011.

The idea and name of the character emerged when The Beano editor George Moonie heard a British music hall song with the chorus "I'm Dennis the Menace from Venice". The character of Dennis was initially a struggle for artist David Law and then Beano chief sub Ian Chisholm to develop. Chisholm described the character to Law, but he was dissatisfied with every sketch the artist showed him. Out of frustration, Chisholm grabbed a pencil and quickly sketched out his creation to Law in the back of his cigarette packet. The drawing consisted of Dennis's trademark messy haircut, knobbly knees, and menacing scowl. Adapting Chisholm's doodle, Law set to work on the character in the strip, which would appear in the 17 March 1951 issue of The Beano. Two months later, Law gave the mischievous boy his distinctive red-and-black striped jersey, outsized shoes and devilish grin.

=== David Law strips (1951–1971) ===
Dennis's first comic strip appearance consisted of him walking into the park with his father and his dog, where a sign is planted informing visitors that they should "keep off the grass". Keeping in with his "world's naughtiest boy" tagline, Dennis makes many attempts to get onto the grass, much to his father's annoyance. Losing his temper, he takes the lead off the dog and puts it on Dennis, thus ending the menace's hijinks. This, like many succeeding it, only made up half a page. Dennis was deemed not popular enough to gain a full-page strip until around 1954. Many of Law's strips ended with Dennis being punished for his troublemaking with corporal punishment, such as a slippering or use of a cane. Throughout the years, Law's Dennis became taller than his debut appearance. It is unknown why Law did this, but many believe it was due to Law's perfectionist nature. In 1954, Dennis replaced Big Eggo as the character next to The Beano title, citing one of many changes of the comic during this period. The following year, Dennis became one of a few characters from DC Thomson comics to be featured in his own annual (the 1956 edition), which continued to 2011.

Dennis was also present in the first Dandy-Beano Summer Special, where he appeared in full colour. This strip featured Dennis begrudgingly selling flags in aid of the dog's home. Bored, he chooses to make this a perfect aid to his menacing. Dennis continued to gain popularity solo as time moved on. His trademark pet, Gnasher, was not introduced until 1968.

In issue 1353 (dated 31 August 1968), Dennis is informed by his father that "people always own dogs that look like themselves". Dennis dismisses this as being "a load of rot" and goes outside. Upon seeing many different owners looking just like their dogs, he begins to consider that it may be true. Upon being informed by Walter of a dog show at the town hall, Dennis decides to enter, but he also needs a dog to do so. This was when he found an Abyssinian wire-haired tripe hound roaming the streets of Beanotown, naming him Gnasher. Menacing the dog show rather than attempting to win it, a dog fight breaks out, and the duo are eventually caught by Dennis' father, who had brought a retriever with him. Dennis's father punishes Dennis, and tells Gnasher to "go and join Pup Parade." Gnasher returned the next week and became Dennis's best friend.

=== David Sutherland strips (1970–1998) ===
In 1971, David Law took ill and retired from the strip, leaving Dennis in need of a new artist. David Sutherland, who was already the artist of Biffo the Bear and The Bash Street Kids, was chosen. Dennis made a cameo in a Biffo story in 1972, citing his wish to be on the cover. This dialogue proved to be almost prophetic, as he became the cover star of the comic in 1974 (issue 1678, cover date 14 September 1974), a position he held until 2018. His first cover story consisted of him using the issue's free gift, the Happy Howler, to torment people, including his Dad and in an opera house, who gives Dennis's dad a free gift of his own, a slipper.

Dennis's popularity was emphasised in 1976, when he was awarded his own fan club. Members would get a membership card, a club wallet and two badges. This became the foundation of The Beano Club years later. The club was well known for being popular amongst celebrities, as well as Beano readers. Phil Lynott, Mark Hamill, and Linford Christie were among many to join. A strip promoting an all-new Dennis T-shirt for club members emerged in 1978. It featured a guest appearance from Minnie the Minx and consisted of the two fighting over to whom the red-and-black jersey image truly belongs.

The Beano turned 40 in 1978. To celebrate, Dennis's weekly comic strip this week featured him celebrating his birthday and his menacing antics with his brand new cowboy outfit.

In 1980, The Beano reached a landmark 2000th issue. The front cover depicted Dennis offering to show readers the first issue of the comic. Incidentally and fitting well with the character's menacing nature, the comic was at the bottom of the pile. The character was then featured in one of the first Beano spin-off comics The Beano Comic Libraries. He was one of the first Beano characters to get a feature-length story, which in turn was called King Dennis. Dennis was also a character present in the most successful Beano annual to date in 1983.

In 1986, one of Dennis's first story arcs appeared. Gnasher, his faithful companion, had gone missing. Distraught, Dennis asked readers to join him on a "Gnational Gnasher Search". At first, Dennis's dad was far happier without the tripehound, but as the week wore on, he found himself missing the dog. The story lasted seven weeks before Gnasher was returned by a father with his six daughters and son, Gnipper, who later became a key character.

On The Beano's 50th anniversary, Dennis's strip consisted of him saving The Beano's birthday cake, which had begun to float away after the rope in which the sailor was pulling it along with the cut by a nearby crab.

A landmark issue for Dennis appeared in 1991, as The Beano announced they were to change his image. The news received much media attention throughout the United Kingdom and it was later revealed to be a publicity stunt in the very strip the image was introduced. Dennis's new attire consisted of a blue tracksuit, sunglasses and headphones connected to a walkman. The tracksuit bottoms ripped due to Dennis's knobbly knees and he ditched the jacket as his father could catch him easier after he had menaced. The end of the strip showed Dennis returning in his trademark jersey and shorts and pea-shooting his nemesis Walter. Dennis also played a vital role in the storyline in which The Beano was turned into colour. The front cover of the famous 2674th issue of the comic depicted Dennis spraying other famous Beano characters with a hose of paint.

In 1993, Beano editor Euan Kerr was becoming concerned at the direction David Sutherland's depiction of the character was taken, with Dennis becoming ever stockier and larger. Kerr, feeling that Dennis was beginning to resemble a thuggish teenager rather than the naughty boy he was intended to be, told Sutherland to make Dennis look younger in appearance. As a result, Dennis was made shorter, with a smaller chin. He retained his familiar outfit but he started to wear trainers. These changes were also made with the intention of making the character easier to animate for the forthcoming Beano Video.

In 1996, the first animated series Dennis and Gnasher was released on the United Kindgom station CBBC, with a second series following in 1998.

After The Beano's 60th anniversary issue in 1998, David Sutherland stopped drawing the strip, and was replaced by former Billy Whizz and The Three Bears artist, David Parkins.

=== David Parkins (1998–2003) ===
Dennis during the Parkins years, as drawn by Nigel Parkinson.

One of David Parkins' first Dennis strips featured a storyline that formally introduced Dennis's younger sister Bea into the comic. The story lasted three issues and consisted of Dennis's fear that a younger sister would ruin his reputation as the toughest menace in Beanotown. It turns out that Bea was as much of a menace as her older brother and it gained a spin-off strip drawn by Nigel Parkinson (who would frequently ghost the main strip during 1999–2004), which Dennis would sometimes cameo in.

Dennis kicked off the new millennium with a strip of him charging 50 pence to access the Menace Dome, a more 'menacing' version of the Millennium Dome. He also starred as a villain in a feature-length Bash Street Kids strip in which he, alongside Minnie the Minx and Roger the Dodger, raced against the Bash Street Kids to find the treasure which was apparently buried underneath the Millennium Dome. It ended with Danny, the Bash Street leader, outwitting Dennis and his cronies and Dennis angrily blaming it on Roger. Whilst a rivalry with The Bash Street Kids was touched on before in other strips, it was this story that made the rivalry far more well known. Several succeeding feature-length strips after, usually drawn by Mike Pearse or Kev F. Sutherland, further depicted the rivalry even to the point it would get violent. He also made other appearances in the spin-off Bash Street Kids - Singled Out, where he would take on a similar role.

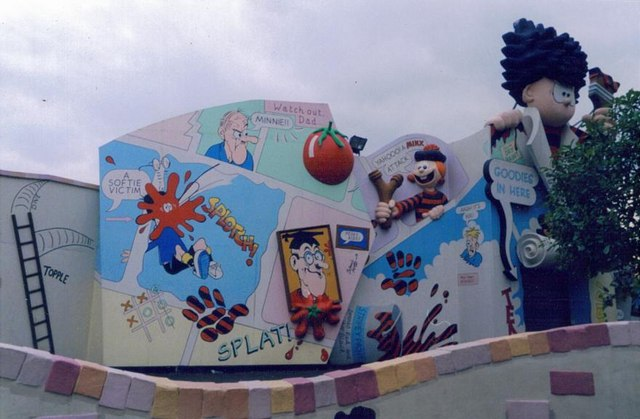
The Beanoland area at Chessington World of Adventures (Dennis is located at the top right)

In 2000, Dennis became a major mascot for Beanoland at the Chessington World of Adventures theme park. He was featured prominently throughout the land including a large figure atop the shop, a member of the squirting water fountain, a character on the dodgems, a silhouette on the entrance and a cast member in the live show located in his treehouse. Later in the park's history, Dennis's Madhouse was introduced, which was a foam ball play area. In 2008, the land was changed into Wild Asia.

In 2001, Dennis turned 50 and celebrated with a house party in which several Beano characters were invited. The same issue also showed readers how Dennis received his trademark jersey, which, it reveals, was initially owned by a boy called Tufty. After he asks when someone would land on the Moon, to which Dennis accurately predicts 20 July 1969, Dennis offers to give him the chance right then. He attaches his granny's homemade soda pop to Tufty, shakes him then removes each of the lids, which causes Tufty to blast off and fall into a nearby lake. Dennis then grabs the jersey and puts it on remarking it 'feels right somehow!'.

In 2003, Dennis appeared as a playable character in the PC game Beanotown Racing. He was featured in several strips leading up to the game's release depicting how he received his vehicle and the races he got into before the game's events. This includes a rivalry with Minnie the Minx who had got her vehicle before him. Dennis tuned up his Menace-Mobile to make a dune buggy.

=== Nigel Parkinson, Jimmy Hansen and Tom Paterson (2004–2009) ===
David Parkins' workload meant he was able to draw the strip on an increasingly less frequent basis throughout his time on the strip, and after 2003, he became too busy to continue as a full-time artist. Nigel Parkinson, who had previously been drawing the strip as Parkins' understudy, continued as an artist, along with Jimmy Hansen coming in to replace Parkins. The pair drew the vast majority of stories between 2004 and 2007, when Tom Paterson also started drawing the strip. In 2008, Dennis was given an extra strip near the back of the comic, usually a continuing story across a few weeks. These strips were usually drawn by Tom Paterson. One such story featured the illness of Gnasher's young pup, Gnipper who had been bitten by a poisonous snake. Throughout this story, Dennis and Gnasher called upon the help of various past characters of the strip's history before finally contacting Gnipper's many sisters who successfully managed to get him out of his coma. Walter also changed in the strip as Dennis was given more reason to belittle and menace him. Instead of being camp and frilly, he was quite rude and obnoxious especially toward Dennis and his friends. Dennis seems more bully than anti-hero at this age.

In 2007, Dennis was featured on the front page of a new magazine BeanoMAX. He was the cover star until 2008, when he was replaced by Max, an exclusive character. Another landmark issue came in 2008, when The Beano turned 70. As a celebration, Dennis was seen on the cover sharing a cake with Wallace and Gromit, whose creator was featured heavily in the issue.

=== 2009 revival (2009–2010) ===
The 2009 logo

When the strip was relaunched in 2009, Dennis faced several changes to his character and appearance. It was the first major revamp of the character since his introduction over 50 years prior. Parkinson, Hansen and Paterson continued to draw the strips, although Dennis became slightly shorter with a boyish look to him as opposed to the brute, tough guy look the previous artists had established. His behind the nose grin was used far less frequently and most of his menacing was toned down. He also no longer used weapons such as a catapult or peashooter save for a few times, so he became more creative in his mischief. The strip's title was shortened to Dennis and Gnasher during these years, and Dennis rarely used the term 'menacing' to describe his actions. Dennis's idol was revealed to be 'Rat-Bucket', a fictional heavy metal singer introduced in the strip. He was also given more rivals as Athena and Sugar were both introduced to the strip. He was also given a new spin-off called Sixty Second Dennis. This was a single page strip that featured Dennis in a short story and it was usually illustrated by Nigel Parkinson.

The reason behind the revival was to promote the new TV series which was just about to hit screens in Britain. It followed Dennis, Curly, Pie-Face and Gnasher as they attempted to brighten up the average day in Beanotown through new ideas, adventures and pranks. The revival is finally done at the Australian animation studio.

On 27 November 2010, The Beano Club was relaunched as The Beano V.I.P. It was officially announced via a Dennis strip where several British celebrities including Ant and Dec, Simon Cowell and Daniel Radcliffe visited Beanotown in an effort to join the club, all failing due to Dennis not deeming them tough enough. In the end, Dennis decides it is only the reader who can become a Beano V.I.P. This was the first strip in which Dennis seemed to actually do his 'menacing' intentionally since his revival in 2009.

=== Barrie Appleby (2011–2012) ===
In early 2011, Dennis's re-launched character slowly and subtly began returning to his "menacing" ways. He began using his weapons again and referring to his antics as menacing. He also began to do his menacing more intentionally as he did in all previous eras. Barrie Appleby, who had previously drawn Roger the Dodger, became the artist as the strip was extended to three pages rather than the usual two. Sixty Second Dennis was also dropped, being replaced by a Gnasher spin-off strip called Gnashional Treasure, later renamed Gnasher's Bit(e). Although the strip continued to be known as Dennis and Gnasher, Dennis was once again overtly referred to as "the menace", and by his 60th birthday, Dennis had returned to his original character (although he retained the likeness of his 2009 TV series counterpart). Meanwhile, Nigel Parkinson continued with lengthier BeanoMAX stories which would often feature other Beano characters.

=== Nigel Parkinson and Nigel Auchterlounie (2012–present) ===
Dennis the Menace, as he appears in the Parkinson years

By August 2012, Dennis's 2009 revival was reverted following yet another revival of the comic. His illustrations were more in tone with David Parkins' era and he partook in genuine naughtiness and disruption again. Nigel Parkinson was named sole official Dennis artist and began the weekly strips while Barrie Appleby returned to Roger the Dodger. Like his 2009 revival, Dennis faced several new changes mainly because of a new editor. His old behind the nose grin returned and he began to once again refer to himself as a 'menace'. His parents had a make-over from Gok Wan, so his traditionally balding father now shared his messy spiked hair and his mother was no longer neatly shaped. Gnasher also returned to normal. A new character called Angel Face was also introduced into the 2013 series and the strip, in order to give Dennis more of a rival.

In honour of the 2012 London Olympic Games, gold medalist Jessica Ennis appeared in a strip, much to public attention. Paralympic runner Oscar Pistorius also appeared, with editor Michael Stirling saying, "When people told Oscar he couldn't be an athlete due to his disability, he ignored them and, in that respect, he's just like Dennis, who never does as he is told." Both strips were extremely well received amongst both the athletes and the public.

In the second panel, Dennis snaps at his father (the Dennis from the 1980s) that he "used to look awesome".

During Series 12 of the BBC's Mock the Week, host Dara Ó Briain and comedians Hugh Dennis, Andy Parsons and Chris Addison were drawn by Nigel Parkinson in a one-off pic with Dennis, which was shown in the second episode, whilst they and guest comedians were discussing the Prince of Wales's appearance in The Beano. Each celebrity was drawn holding a weapon (Hugh a peashooter, Chris a water gun, Dara a plunger and bow, and Andy a catapult), and all four were drawn with Dennis's trademark red-and-black striped top, shorts, black socks and brown shoes (except Andy, who had red trainers).

Beginning in November 2012, Dennis was written by former Dandy writer, Nigel Auchterlounie, who gave Dennis and the other characters wider personalities. Auchterlounie's strips have been very well received since taking over the strip. Dennis's younger years in Beanotown Preschool were chronicled in a strip called The BamBeanos.

For The Beano's 75th anniversary, Dennis' parents noticeably changed appearance. His father had become a pot-bellied man with black, spiky hair and similar colour-schemed clothes to him, and his mother had red, shaggy hair. It was later revealed in 2015 that Dennis' father was the original Dennis the Menace from the 1980s in issue 3932 in a featured strip about him campaigning to be mayor, in which his opponent, Walter's father, starts a hate campaign by showing potential voters videos of Dennis, Sr.'s antics as a child. Although there is no distinct timeline in the comic strip, editor-in-chief Mike Stirling explained: "There's no definable lineage [in Dennis and Gnasher], but there can only ever be one Dennis at any time. It serves as a salutary warning that even the coolest kids can become boring grown-ups."

In 2021, The Beano celebrated Dennis' 70th anniversary with a special issue guest-edited by Joe Sugg.

== Character traits ==
Dennis is an uncontrollable schoolboy who takes pride in causing chaos and mayhem to those around him due to his intolerance for rules and order. Such traits have caused some artists and writers to consider him a villain, as, in such strips, Dennis would often prove himself to be selfish and greedy, tending to disregard his friends in favour of treasures. His misbehaviour stems from what The Beano explains as an attempt to add excitement to an otherwise dull day. Additionally, Dennis is often considered to be a loner, seeking no solace in anyone's company aside from his faithful pet dog Gnasher. Feature-length strips in The Beano reveal that Dennis has a rivalry with The Bash Street Kids, often brawling and attempting to outwit them, with a particular dislike for Danny, the leader.

Dennis has had a fairly stable friendship with Minnie the Minx and Roger the Dodger, enough so that the three have been seen to work together often. Dennis has also been shown to be very heroic, having saved his town on occasion from potential disaster. The Beano Annual 2001–2002, both exemplified this in their stories in which Dennis defeated a race of 'Beanobots'. He is fairly academically challenged and extremely clever in mechanical invention. On occasion, he makes from scratch his own vehicles, including a Menace Dune-Buggy and a working rocket.

Talking of the character's longevity and changes over the years, Beano editor Michael Stirling stated: "I'm sure he'll change again over the years, If kids are going around on hoverboards in 10 years' time, Dennis will definitely have one. It's really up to kids, and I think it's always been that way, and that's why we're able to appeal to kids today as well as to their parents. He's a great role model. That might sound counterintuitive because he's naughty, but his mischief nowadays is a lot more driven by positive things, and just making sure kids are really listened to."

== Characters ==
Over the years, there has been a variety of subsidiary characters.

=== Dennis's family ===
Dennis is the main character of the strip. Badly behaved and visually rebellious, Dennis uses a wide range of pranks and weaponry in order to cause chaos and mayhem to those around him. He is recognised by his scruffy black hair and red-and-black jumper.

Dad appeared in the first strip. His real name has never been given (although once it was cited as actually being "Dennis's Dad" in a letter by Dennis). He also appears in both Bea and Gnasher and Gnipper. The real name of his wife, Mum, has also never been given (again in the same letter, it was stated that her actual name is "Dennis's Mum", though in the 2020 annual, the mayor called her Sandra). In the 2012 revamp, he was redrawn to look more like Dennis. This was explained in 2015 as Dad now being the grown-up version of the 1980s Dennis the Menace, making the original Dad the new Dennis' grandfather.

Bea is Dennis's little sister, born in issue 2931, dated 19 September 1998. She has her own strip (Bea, originally Beaginnings) and sometimes appears in Dennis the Menace and Gnasher. Bea wears a stripy yellow and black vest, this is a pun on her name as the colours are the same as the colours on a Bumble bee.

Granny is Dennis's and Bea's 80-year-old grandmother. In the late 1980s/early 1990s, she got her own strip Go, Granny, Go! drawn by Brian Walker. This transformed her from the indulgent Granny who used the Demon Whacker when necessary to a very active elderly lady who enjoyed motorbikes, similar to Cuddles and Dimples's granny, partly because, by this time, characters in The Beano were no longer punished with the slipper. She also appeared regularly in the 2009 TV series and 2017 TV series.

Denise is Dennis's cousin, who bears a striking resemblance to Beryl the Peril, although she also wears a red-and-black striped jumper. She appeared in just a few stories, visiting along with her cat Santa Claws. She generally managed to out-menace Dennis, showing considerable fortitude against the Softies, and at the local boxing club. Santa Claws also appeared in a Roger the Dodger strip in the 2008 Beano Annual.

=== Animals ===
Gnasher is an "Abyssinian wire-haired tripehound" who first appeared in issue 1363, dated 31 August 1968. He has extremely strong teeth that can leave teeth marks in seemingly anything and enjoys chasing postmen. This is the source of his name, "gnashers" being slang for "teeth". In the first-ever Dennis the Menace strip, the family also had a Scottish Terrier, who has not since appeared.

Since 1986, Gnasher has had a son, Gnipper, who appears with him in the separate strip (Gnasher and Gnipper). Gnipper is owned by Dennis the Menace. He first appeared in issue 2286, dated 10 May 1986 after a story arc in which Gnasher went missing, this story arc was reprinted in the Dennis the Menace Annual 1990 as a 16-page story entitled Who's Gnicked Gnasher?. Gnipper's name is a pun since "to nip" (something) means to give something a small bite, while "nipper" is a slang term for a young child.

Gnasher also has several daughters, namely Gnatasha, Gnaomi, Gnanette, Gnorah and Gnancy, although these are rarely seen. Gnatasha had her own strip in The Beezer and Topper, and appeared in the Beezer Book 1994. Gnasher also used to have another strip, Gnasher's Tale, which began in 1977 and continued for nine years until the title was changed to Gnasher and Gnipper following Gnipper's introduction.

Rasher is a pig, first seen in issue 1920, dated 5 May 1979. He loves to eat swill and he was rescued by Dennis. Rasher also has children: Oink, Snort, Grunt, Squeal, and Squeak. He used to have his own strip called Rasher, which started in 1984 and appeared regularly for four years before making sporadic appearances until 1995, Rasher's strip also appeared for a few weeks in 2010. He was believed to have been dropped after the strip was revamped in 2009, but he made a surprise return to the strip in 2011.

Dennis has been seen with his pet spider called Dasher. He first appeared in about 1987, as a tool to scare Walter, and was the mascot of the Beano website when it launched in 1997. Originally, the spider was all black, but when it reappeared in 1997, it was red and black, matching Dennis's jersey. He appeared a few times from 1997 to 2008 and then reappeared in the 2011 and 2016 Halloween issues.

=== Other children ===
Dennis has historically had two main friends: Curly (real name Crispin), who has a lot of strawberry-blond, curly hair, was the first to appear, debuting months after the strip started in 1951. Although Curly and Dennis get into many fights, they still remain the best of friends. Then there is Pie Face (real name Kevin, later retconned as Peter Shepherd), whose favourite food is pies. Dennis, Gnasher, Curly and Pie Face were collectively called "The Menaces"; they were all in a band called Dennis and the Dinmakers. Pie Face currently has his own strip in The Beano as well as his 'pet' Paul the Potato. They are both by Nigel Auchterlounie and Diego Jourdan. During the 1980s, a third boy known as "Toadface McGurty" was also one of Dennis's friends.

Since the 2017 revamp of the Dennis feature, Curly was removed. In his place in Dennis's friend group are two girls, Rubidium von Screwtop (from The Beano's Rubi's Screwtop Science strip) and Jemima Jones (from the comic's 'JJ's Jokes' strip). Despite Dennis' perception of girls as soppy in earlier years, he accepts the tech-minded Rubi and tough, often prankish JJ as his friends.

The rival gang to the Menaces is the Softies, a group of kids who rather than being bratty, traditionally enjoy refined things such as teddy bears, dolls and flowers. The most famous Softy—Dennis's greatest sworn enemy—is Walter, sometimes called the "Prince of Softies" in earlier years. He has a pet poodle called Foo-Foo. The two most other frequently seen Softies are Bertie Blenkinsop and Algernon "Spotty" Perkins. Other Softies, seen less often, have included Bennie Benry, Sweet William, Dudley Nightshirt, Jeremy Snodgrass, Softy Matthew, Softy Pal Erasmus, Lisping Lester, and Nervous Rex, who is scared of everything and everyone.

Matilda, Walter's girlfriend introduced in the 1996 TV series, was presumably a Softy, though her forceful attitude toward Walter suggested otherwise. For a brief time in the late 1970s and early 1980s, Dennis' friend Curly was also presented as a Softy.

=== Other characters ===
The Colonel is an old army colonel, who is often seen with toy soldiers and often makes references to being in battles which happened hundreds of years ago. In an episode of the 2009 TV series, entitled 'The Trial', his first name was revealed to be Godfrey.

Sergeant Slipper is the police sergeant who is always trying to catch Dennis for menacing. In the 1960s, a well-known police officer was known as Slipper of the Yard, though "slipper" is also a nod to the instrument with which Dennis's father usually chastised him, before attitudes toward corporal punishment against children changed.

Dennis's Teacher often appeared in Dennis the Menace strips from the early 1970s and has been replaced, although the character was absent for most of the intervening period, in the 2009 TV Series by another Teacher named Mrs Creecher.

Nasty Norman was a bully often seen as Dennis's rival.

Stanley Livingstone, an explorer with a pet crocodile, Carruthers, who lived next door to Dennis. Seemingly replaced by the Colonel, though the character had disappeared a while before the Colonel first appeared. His name alludes to the explorers David Livingstone and H.M. Stanley.

== In other media ==
Title	Directed by	Written by	Dennis portrayed by
The Beano's Dennis the Menace and Gnasher Show (1990, TCC)	Bob Harvey	Mike Barfield; Bob Harvey	Logan Murray
The Beano Video (1993, ITV)	Derek Mogford	Jo Pullen	Susan Sheridan
The Beano Videostars (1994, ITV)	Terry Ward	Richard Everett; Terry Ward	Mark Pickard
Dennis & Gnasher (1996, BBC)	Tony Collingwood	Tony Collingwood; Chris Trengove; Jimmy Hibbert; David Freedman; Alan Gilbey	Richard Pearce
Dennis & Gnasher (2009, BBC)	Glenn Kirkpatrick	-	Sophie Aldred (S1) Chris Johnson (S2) Jane Ubrien [AU dub]
Dennis & Gnasher: Unleashed! (2017, BBC)	Boris Heistand	Jen Upton; Tony Cooke; Denise Cassar; Matt Baker; Ciaran Murtagh; Andrew Jones	Freddie Fox [UK only] Bryce Papenbrook [US dub]

=== Television and video ===
Dennis's first regular TV appearance was in the puppet series The Beano's Dennis the Menace and Gnasher Show, which aired on TCC, starting in 1990. The show was directed by Bob Harvey and written by Mike Barfield, with artwork by John Bonner. John Du Prez composed the punk-style theme music. Dennis and the other characters were voiced by Logan Murray. The first series featured only Dennis, Gnasher and Walter. The second series in 1991 added Mum and Dad.

Dennis appears alongside other Beano characters in the 1993 made-for-television/direct-to-video release, The Beano Video, which was aired on ITV. Dennis was voiced by Susan Sheridan. All the stories were adapted from previous Beano strips.

Dennis appears once again in The Beano Videostars, which aired on ITV in 1994. In this film, several Beano characters attend a premiere in which a brand new Beano film is being shown. Dennis arrives in his "Menace-Mobile" with Gnasher and pelts the presenter with tomatoes in his usual menacing fashion. He was voiced by Mark Pickard.

Dennis was the main character of a 1996 TV series originally titled Dennis the Menace, but it changed in the second season to Dennis & Gnasher. This version of Dennis still gets up to the same old tricks. Throughout the whole series, he does not use a catapult or peashooter and is often far more heroic than the Beano version. The show ran for two seasons and was shown on TCC, CBBC and Fox Kids. Richard Pearce voiced Dennis in this series.

Later in 2009, Dennis re-appeared on television again in a series (along with the Australian studio) once again called Dennis & Gnasher. His behaviour was toned down far more showing quite a different personality to that of the comic Dennis, which was changed to match the TV series but it has since gradually changed back. This Dennis preferred fun over mischief and often did menacing inadvertently. The first season ran for 52 episodes on CBBC and in the U.S., it was also shown on The Hub (now known as "Discovery Family"). In mid-2013, the show returned with a new name, Dennis the Menace and Gnasher. The second season ran for 50 episodes on the CBBC channel. Dennis was voiced by Sophie Aldred in the first series, and Chris Johnson in the second series. Jane Ubrien voiced Dennis in the series' Australian dub.

In 2017, a new series aired, titled Dennis & Gnasher: Unleashed!. It is the first series to be animated in CGI. Freddie Fox provides Dennis' voice in the new series.

In 2020, a series revolving around Dennis as a teenager was pitched. It was reported to be a darker take on the comic – not too dissimilar to American television series Chilling Adventures of Sabrina and Riverdale. The story would focus on Dennis and his troubles with police and it was reported to be influenced by British drama series Skins. It is unknown if it was scrapped or cancelled, due to the copyrights from The Beano.

=== Video games ===
Dennis is playable in the PC game Beanotown Racing. His vehicle is his Menace-Mobile, designed as a dune buggy. He and Gnasher are non-playable characters in the iPhone game, Dennis & Gnasher: Blast in Beanotown. In December 2014, an official Dennis the Menace Minecraft mod was released.

=== Theme park ===
Dennis was the main mascot for the Beanoland section in Chessington World of Adventures, from 1999 to 2010. He was a meet and greet character as well as the subject of a short-lived amusement show located in his treehouse. A funhouse in which children could fire foam balls at each other was built later and named "Dennis' Madhouse".

=== Musical ===
In 2015, it was announced that a musical based on the comics will be presented for the Old Vic Theatre in London as part of artistic director Matthew Warchus' musical commissioning programme with producers Scott Rudin and Sonia Friedman. Playwright and poet Caroline Bird is writing the book.

== Broadcast owners ==
ITV had broadcast rights from 1990 to 1995 and the BBC since 1996.

== Reception and legacy ==
BBC News once called Dennis the 'definitive naughty boy'. Matthew Jarron of Dundee University, curator of a Beano exhibition, claimed that the strips 'blatant anti-establishment tone' is what keeps children entertained throughout the decades. Children's author and political columnist Michael Rosen said he enjoyed the prospect that 'In most children's books a bad child gets made good. But the great thing about Dennis is he never gets better'. Nick Newman cited his inspiration for a Private Eye strip based on the Menace due to the fact Dennis is 'relentless' and has 'no learning curve'. Jarron also argued that Dennis offers a sense of escapism in a modern cotton wool wrapped world stating 'Parents are so fearful of letting their children roam around. So Dennis can provide that vicarious pleasure of going out and doing anything. And it's menacing of a pretty benign kind'. Express called Dennis 'the child template for every post-war rebel without a cause'. John McShane, a comic historian, further praised the strip calling Dennis 'an original looking character. In the early days, it was not in full colour but it had a red overlay. The mantra in design classes is: 'Black and Red will always be read.' And that spiky hair! Unforgettable. Then that cheeky expression. Cartoonists talk about drawings just 'coming right'; that expression is perfect. Dennis is not actually evil ... Dennis just wants fun and is prepared to accept the consequences'.

Alongside praise from the press, Dennis encountered controversy amongst the media in the late 1990s and early 2000s for being 'homophobic' and a 'bully'. On the criticism, Maurice Heggie, a Dandy editor, stated 'I never saw him as a bully because the characters of the softies were so dreadful, they had no redeeming features either.' He went on to explain that 'if Dennis was bullying them, then there was a punishment. There was never a script out of DC Thomson where a bully succeeded – there was always a punishment – however, horrible Dennis was with his water pistol, be sure that round the corner there was an elephant with a trunkful of water for him. He's changed over the years, but he's not changed ... He is essentially out for mischief all the time'. John McShane also defended the strip stating firmly that 'Dennis never got away with his pranks'. On whether the stories of Walter's homosexuality were true, McShane affirmed that he didn't know but argued' He certainly needed to stand up for himself. Our sympathies were never with him because he didn't stand up to Dennis. Bullies have to be stood up to; another good lesson for any society.' In an article for the Guardian, Dennis is cited as 'Britain's longest surviving comic villain'.

=== 2009 redesign controversy ===
In 2009, the strip gained negative media publicity after it was announced that new issues would draw inspiration from the TV series that aired the same year. In the series, Dennis did not use his trademark catapult, peashooter and water gun, and his personality was re-established as naively troublesome rather than intentionally so. Gnasher was also forbidden from biting people. Their image was drastically revamped in an attempt to make them more accessible to younger viewers, and to discourage violence and weaponry among children. Fans spoke out against The Beano's decision, saying that "Dennis is supposed to be a little bit edgy and a bit of a lovable rogue". Kev F Sutherland, who wrote for The Beano in the early 2000s, also spoke out against the makeover, saying it was a "bad idea" and arguing "if you pander too much to over-sensitive parents, you will end with not very funny comedy". The daughters of Dennis the Menace creator David Law further criticized the makeover, saying their father would be "horrified" at the new design and calling it "bland" and "ordinary". The change lasted for roughly a year before artist Nigel Parkinson was sought out to return the character to its roots and original design. The television series was considerably altered during its second season to suit the tone of the comics, making Dennis closer to his comic book age and personality.

== In popular culture ==
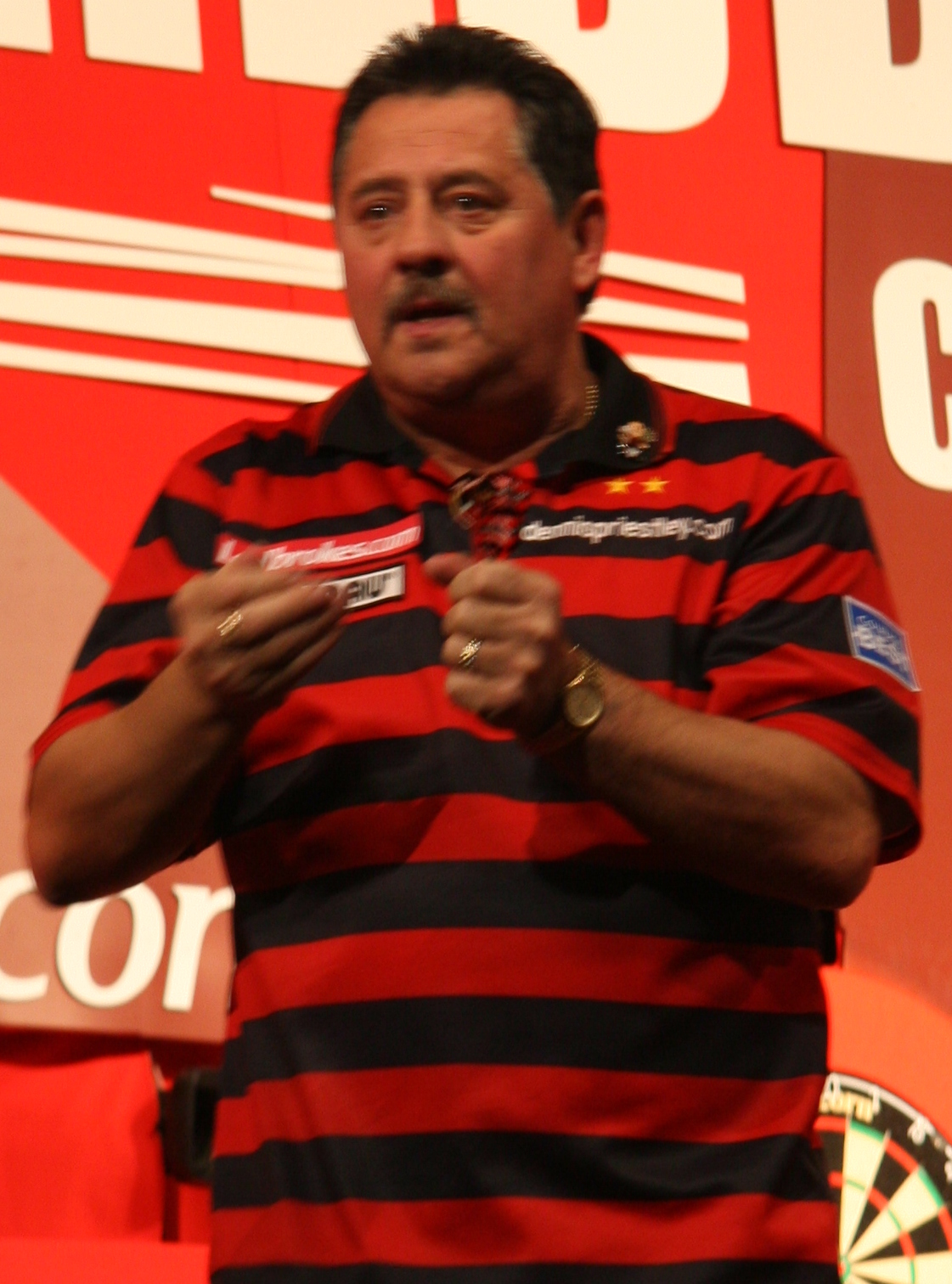
Darts player Dennis "The Menace" Priestley wearing the character's red and black striped colours

Darts player Dennis Priestley is known as "The Menace" and wears a shirt with the familiar red and black horizontal bands. On stage, grunge star Kurt Cobain occasionally wore a Dennis pullover that Courtney Love bought from a Nirvana fan in Northern Ireland in 1992. In recent years, the satirical magazine Private Eye has carried comic strips featuring a character sometimes called Beano Boris or Boris the Menace, a blond-haired version of Dennis the Menace, parodying the politician Boris Johnson.

Tom Petty, guitarist Mike Campbell, and bassist Jeff Lynne wear shirts depicting Dennis and Gnasher in the music video for Petty's song "I Won't Back Down".

In 2018, the Isle of Man produced a set of Christmas stamps featuring Dennis and Gnasher.

In 2021, on the second series of RuPaul's Drag Race UK, contestant Ellie Diamond, who is from Dundee, modelled as Dennis the Menace on the runway during the first episode challenge "Queen of Your Hometown". The outfit is now on display at the city's McManus Galleries.

The Alan Moore/Mick Jenkins film The Show features a protagonist named Fletcher Dennis, who wears the red-and-black striped jumper and wields a slingshot as a weapon, implying that he is a grown up Dennis who became a morally scrupulous hitman.

In 2026, the Royal Mint issued a commemorative 50p. coin to mark the 75th anniversary of Dennis's first appearance in The Beano. The design shows Dennis in his familiar red-and-black striped jumper alongside Gnasher.
