= Susan Sheridan =

British actress (1947–2015)

- Born: Susan Haydn Thomas; 18 March 1947
- Died: 8 August 2015 (aged 68); Windsor, Berkshire, England
- Occupation: Actress
- Years active: 1969–2015
- Spouse: Max Brittain (m. 1981)
- Children: 3

Susan Haydn Thomas (18 March 1947 – 8 August 2015), better known as Susan Sheridan, was a British actress. Her roles included Noddy in Noddy's Toyland Adventures, Princess Sylvia in Muzzy in Gondoland, Trillian in the BBC radio series The Hitchhiker's Guide to the Galaxy, Serafina Pekkala in the BBC audiobooks of His Dark Materials, and Princess Eilonwy in the animated film The Black Cauldron.

== Early and personal life ==
Sheridan trained at the Guildhall School of Music and Drama. Sheridan married the musician Max Brittain and had three daughters. She died of breast cancer on 8 August 2015, aged 68.

== Voice roles ==
Sheridan's voice roles include:

- Alex Builds His Farm – Alex
- The Black Cauldron – Princess Eilonwy
- Fire Tripper (English version) – Shu
- Moomin (English dub) – Moomin
- Noddy's Toyland Adventures – Noddy, Tessie Bear and other character voices
- Budgie the Little Helicopter – "Down on the Farm", additional characters
- The Little Polar Bear – Lars, Lena, Peeps, Mummy Polar Bear
- Round the Bend – Additional voices
- The Goose Girl
- The Family-Ness
- Jimbo and the Jet-Set – Jimbo
- Albert the Fifth Musketeer – Milady
- Muzzy – Princess Sylvia
- Preston Pig – Pumpkin and other character voices
- The Animal Shelf – Timothy, Little Mutt, Getup the Giraffe
- The Beano Video – Dennis the Menace, Walter's Mum, Minnie the Minx, Boy #1 (Benji), Boy #2, Minnie's Fans, Danny, Fatty, 'Erbert, Toots, Olive, Cheap-o Airways Lady, Ma Bear, Sea Noises
- The Beano Videostars – Dennis' Mum, Walter's Mum, Cynthia, Newsreader, Mrs Ramsbottom, Baby #1, Mrs Blenkinsop, Danny, Smiffy, Toots, Olive, Toots' Mum, Baby #2, Ma, Pedestrian #4, Poolgoer #2
- Father Christmas and the Missing Reindeer – Simon Watson, Wanda
- The Lampies – Livewire, Contact
- Bye Bye, Lady Liberty – Michael

== Theatre ==
She was active in theatre with roles in touring companies.

- The Merry Wife of Wilton (1988)
- Howl's Moving Castle (2011) (adaptation)

== Radio and television roles ==
- Agony (1980)
- Midsomer Murders (2011)
- Sheila Hodgon's Here Am I Where Are You? – A boy (1977)
- The Hitchhiker's Guide to the Galaxy – Trillian
- His Dark Materials – Serafina Pekkala (1999)

== Filmography ==
| Year | Title | Role | Notes |
|---|---|---|---|
| 1985 | The Black Cauldron | Princess Eilonwy | Voice |
| 1985 | Peter No Tail in America | Peter-No-Tail | Voice, English version |
| 2000 | Eisenstein | Wedding Official | Voice |
