= Dennis the Menace Annual =

Yearly children's comic book series

The Dennis the Menace Annual (sometimes called the Dennis the Menace and Gnasher Annual and later called the Dennis and Gnasher Annual) was the name of the book that was published between 1955 and 2011 to tie in with the children's comic The Beano, specifically the Dennis the Menace comic strip. Since they are traditionally published in the northern autumn and in time for Christmas, from 1965 (with the release of Dennis the Menace 1966) they have had the date of the following year on the cover. Before then no date was given. Until the 2009 edition, the annuals mainly featured reprints from around 14–15 years ago from the cover date of Dennis the Menace, Gnasher and Gnipper and formerly Gnasher's Tale and Rasher strips in The Beano, although there is some new material. The 2010 and 2011 editions contained all new material based on the updated style seen in the CBBC series.

Originally a new annual was published every two years. However, after the 1987 annual was published it was decided to make the annual a yearly publication instead. The next annual was published the following year and the others every year onwards since then.

The original title was simply "Dennis the Menace" with the year added at the end later on. This name continued, the year changing for each different annual, until the release of the 1978 book. There was then a short break until the next annual was published in 1982 (for '83). From then on the words "from The Beano" were printed elsewhere on the cover, the same thing The Bash Street Kids Annual had been doing for a few years earlier.

The name has had various suffixes since then, including "and Gnasher" on the 1988, 1989, 1994, 1995, 1997, 2007, 2008 and 2009 books, and "Book" on the 1991, 1996, 1999, 2001 and 2002 editions. The annual permanently changed its name to Dennis the Menace Annual from the 2003 book, though the following year and "from The Beano" still appear. The 2010 edition was renamed the Dennis & Gnasher Annual to tie into the CBBC cartoon. It now says "as seen on CBBC" instead of "from The Beano". There was no 2012 annual.

The information below dates older annuals which were without publication dates. Annuals were published the autumn before with the 1956 annual published Autumn 1955. Prices are in shillings and (old) pence with one shilling equal to 5p.

- 1956. Large picture of Dennis holding tin of paint. Price 5/-
- 1958. Dennis travelling down hill on a go-cart, knocking over a policeman, a chimney sweep and a painter. Price 5/6
- 1960. Dennis wearing flippers and swimming underwater, using pincers on a swimmer's foot. Price 5/6
- 1962. Dennis holding large caricature head of himself over his head with five small figures next to him including a policeman and a school teacher. Price 5/6
- 1964. Head of Dennis bursting through a black and red paper sheet. Price 6/-
- 1966 - 1970 to be added?

== See also ==
- List of DC Thomson publications
