= The Broons =

Scottish comic series

Ken H. Harrison's The Broons (8 March 1992)

The Broons (Scots for "the Browns") is a comic strip published in the weekly Scottish newspaper The Sunday Post. It features the Broon family, who live in a tenement flat at 10 Glebe Street in the fictional Scottish town of Auchentogle or Auchenshoogle. Created by writer/editor R. D. Low and artist Dudley D. Watkins, the strip made its first appearance in the issue dated 8 March 1936.

Since its inception, The Broons has had its own biennial, alternating each year with Oor Wullie. No annuals were published during 1943 and 1944 due to paper rationing in World War II, but jigsaws were created instead. Following the 80th anniversary in 2016, an additional annual of The Broons was issued for 2017, breaking from the biennial pattern.

== Characters ==
The family members include:

- Paw Broon – the patriarch, a working man with a fondness for "baccy" (tobacco), the occasional dram of single malt, and horse betting. With his comb-over hairstyle and walrus moustache, his appearance was supposedly based on A. C. "Archie" Brown, the chief editor of publisher D. C. Thomson & Co. at the time The Broons originated. Paw disapproves of most young behaviour. He is a main character: there are very few strips where he is not featured. It is usually him who ends up being made the fool of, after he has made a smart-alec comment. He is generally said to be still working at the shipyards, though a few strips depict him as a retiree.
- Maw Broon – the formidable mother of eight. She has to run every aspect of the household and keep her husband, Paw, in line. Her first name was revealed to be Maggie in one strip, which was confirmed in Maw Broon's Cookbook, published in 2007 (this book was followed by The But an' Ben Cookbook in 2008). Maw comes from a more genteel background than her husband and often tries to instill more sophisticated manners in the rest of the family.
- Granpaw Broon – Paw's widowed 80-year-old father, who spends most of his time sitting on a park bench with his "cronies" (friends) or tending his allotment. He shares Paw's preoccupation with having an ample supply of tobacco or whisky. Granpaw was a slightly later addition, not appearing in the earliest strips. In some of these, the family had a picture of Granpaw on their wall; it could do certain actions, such as wagging its finger at the children. Initially, Granpaw was portrayed in a bad light, as a miser and a scheming moocher, but he was later rewritten as a loveable rogue who often gets into more mischief than his young grandchildren. It was revealed in Maw Broon's Cookbook (2007) that his late wife was named Jeannie.
- Hen (Henry) Broon – The lanky, awkward eldest child, aged about 31. He is often taken advantage of for his height (for example, being made to act as a clothes pole to keep the washing line up). In early Broons cartoons he wore a zoot suit. Hen is aspirational. For example, every couple of years or so he buys a car. Such purchases, however, always end in failure.
- Daphne Broon – The plump, somewhat dowdy daughter who is always playing second fiddle to her beautiful sister Maggie on double dates. Every few years she has a stroke of luck when the double dates get mixed up and she gets Maggie's man. At least once a year, Daphne tries to go on a diet but fails to lose any weight. She is a skilled dressmaker and has a penchant for flamboyant hats.
- Joe (Joseph) Broon – an ordinary working man with a muscular physique and a love for sports, particularly boxing. He is something of a ladies' man, and often competes with Hen for the attention of women (with Joe winning). The twins see him as a role model.
- Maggie (Margaret) Broon – The beautiful, glamorous daughter, with blonde hair and fashionable clothing. She has a steady stream of beaux and is bitterly envied by the drab Daphne. In the later editions, Maggie became a model and a weather girl. For a brief time in the 80s she was inexplicably renamed Sadie before her name was changed back to Maggie.
- Horace Broon – A bookish and bespectacled teenage schoolboy who is usually seen sitting quietly with his schoolbooks while the rest of the family causes some kind of commotion. He is quite pompous and likes to think of himself as an example to the twins.
- The Twins – Identical twin boys who are in primary school. Although one is called Eck (short for Alexander), they are always referred to collectively, with few exceptions (such as Granpaw calling them "ae twin" and "the ither twin"). They are rambunctious youngsters and usually add to the chaos with a fistfight or a good game of cowboys and Indians.
- The Bairn – The youngest of the family at about four years of age. She is basically a smaller version of Maw, getting in her share of indignant moral pronouncements and pointing out the foolishness of the male Broons. She and Granpaw are deeply close. Her first name is never revealed; she is simply addressed as "my wee lamb", "dear", "pet" etc.

== Storylines ==
The family surname is the Scots form of "Brown", as indicated by the nameplate that occasionally appears on the front door of their flat. Non-Scottish (e.g. English or American) characters will also address members of the family as "Mister (or Mrs or Miss) Brown".

Early strips written in the 1930s featured less dialogue and the pictures told the story. This was more common in Oor Wullie strips. However, occasional Broons strips did this too.

During the 1970s, in stories drawn by Tom Lavery, another character named Dave MacKay was regularly featured. Dave was Maggie's long-term boyfriend and later her fiancé, although the latter aspect only featured in the original Sunday Post strips, with all mentions of the engagement removed for the annual reprints. Although his father was an old school friend of Paw, his mother was upper–middle-class, much to the chagrin of Paw and Maw. Despite the Broons' perpetual deference to their social "betters", many comical premises were built on the family's attempts to impress members of the landed gentry, or the clergy. Many storylines featured Paw bringing shame on the family by being seen wearing torn trousers or working clothes by the "meenister" (Church of Scotland minister). Maggie's character also changed during this time, becoming more posh. Unlike the rest of the Broons, she spoke Standard English rather than Modern Scots. When Peter Davidson took over from Lavery, the character was dropped without explanation. The 2012 special annual The Broons and Oor Wullie: Classic Strips from the 70's reveals the fate of the character which was created specially for this book.

Most of the humour derives from the timeless themes of the "generation gap", stretching the money as far as possible, and the constant struggle for each family member to live in a very small flat with the other nine Broons. In the end, the family always support one another, getting through life with a gentle good humour as they argue amongst themselves.

Another staple of the series is misunderstanding: inevitably the bairn or the twins mishear something Granpaw or another family member says, and the whole family acts on it until the truth is revealed in the final panel. An example is where the twins are told by Daphne that she is bringing her boyfriend up to dinner and that he is half Polish and half French. While Maggie makes a French salad and Paw finds a flag from each country, Hen asks if they know the man's name – Angus MacKay. Hen and Paw go with the twins to see his shop and discover that he is a French polisher.

== Locations ==
As with Oor Wullie, Watkins left the setting of the strips unnamed (the Broons' address, Glebe Street, is generic, being a common street name throughout Britain). However, his use of words and phrases more commonly associated with the east coast of Scotland, such as "bairn" for "child" instead of the west-central "wean", suggests he was using his own immediate environment (he lived in Broughty Ferry and worked in Dundee). Since the 1990s, however, The Broons has been set in the fictional town of Auchenshoogle.

The Broons own a small cottage, called the but and ben, somewhere in the Highlands but within a relatively short distance of their home. They enjoy weekends away there, although the younger Broons show some reluctance to go. In a 1940s strip, the house is shown to be on a hillside on the east side of the River Ness, and an arrow also points to Auchentoogle being located on the northern bank of Loch Ness, near Dores. The house was referred to as being in a secret location in "The Broons Days Oot" travel guide published in 2009. In Still Game's 2007 Hogmanay special, "Hootenanny," Jack compares Joe's Highland cottage to "the but 'n ben out of the bloody Broons", as a comical way to comment upon how shabby it appears.

== Annuals ==
Although The Broons and Oor Wullie started in 1936, annuals were not published until 1939, starting with The Broons. Since then, annuals for the two strips have appeared in alternate years. Books pre-1965 were not dated. After that they had a copyright date, with annuals normally published in Autumn. Early Broons annuals are highly sought-after collector's items, fetching in excess of four-figure sums at auction. A facsimile of the very first Broons annual was released on 25 November 2006.

Watkins drew the strip from his Broughty Ferry home until his death in 1969. For five years after Watkins' death, D. C. Thomson recycled old strips in the newspaper and annuals, fearing no adequate replacement could be found to match Watkins' unique style. In these repeated strips, some particularly Scots words were replaced (e.g., "ahint" became "behind") and the pre-decimal coinage was updated. Mike Donaldson is the current artist, succeeding Peter Davidson. BBC Radio Scotland presenter Tom Morton was the scriptwriter until 2006, when Dave Donaldson took over. Morris Heggie, former editor of The Dandy, is one of the current writers; however, credits are now attributed when published in The Sunday Post.

== Television ==
The Broons were portrayed in a sketch on the BBC Scotland comedy show Naked Video. Tony Roper was cast as Paw, Gregor Fisher played Maw, Elaine C. Smith portrayed the Bairn, Jonathan Watson appeared as Joe, and Louise Beattie appeared as Horace, with the other family members (and Oor Wullie) mentioned in passing. The sketch revolved around Paw's naivety in the modern world and his inability to move with the times, not even realising that his entire offspring are the product of an affair Maw was having with a farmer.

In December 2005, the BBC Scotland documentary Happy Birthday Broons, narrated by Ewan McGregor, celebrated the family's 70th anniversary. Celebrity guests included Muriel Gray, Ford Kiernan, Sanjeev Kohli, Eddi Reader, Elaine C. Smith, Ricky Ross, Tony Roper, Tam Cowan, Grant Morrison, and Frank Quitely. The programme was made by Angel Eye Media and was nominated for a Best Documentary BAFTA. It was followed by Happy Birthday Oor Wullie.

== See also ==
- List of DC Thomson publications
