= Walter the Softy =

Comic strip character from The Beano

- Character from The Beano

Publication information
- Star of: Dennis the Menace and Gnasher (1953 – present)
- First appearance: Issue 577; (8 August 1953)
- Appearance timeline: Issues 577 – 3906 – present
- Creator(s): David Law
- Author(s): Uncredited

In-universe information
- Full name: Walter Brown
- Occupation: Student
- Family: Walter's Dad (father; now called Wilbur "Carter" Brown); Walter's Mum (mother; now called Muriel Brown)
- Friends: Bertie Blenkinsop (best friend; now assistant); Past friend(s); Spotty Perkins; Dudley Nightshirt; Jeremy Snodgrass; Timothy Sopwith; Nervous Rex; Pets; Foo Foo; Claudius; Clawdia
- Enemies: Dennis the Menace; Gnasher

Walter Brown (pejoratively nicknamed "Walter the Softy") is a fictional character that appears in the comic strip Dennis the Menace and Gnasher in the British comic magazine The Beano. He is the rival and archenemy to Dennis the Menace who is vilified because of his lack of interest in stereotypically masculine activities and attitudes. From his first appearance in 1953, Walter became the target of Dennis' pranks and misbehaviour, but he would brush it off. Sometimes in the 1980s, Walter's characterisation changed after reader backlash and made him a snobbish rich boy foil to his enemies.

== Character background ==
Walter Brown first appeared in The Beano issue 577 in Dennis the Menace, two years after the comic strip's debut. He is a seemingly "perfect" child who is adored by his teachers for his hardworking and polite attitude. He enjoys picking flowers, ballet dancing in a tutu, playing with tea sets and Wendy houses, knitting and cross-dressing, with friends that act similar, owning well-behaved pets throughout the years (Foo-Foo, Claudius and Clawdia).

Walter had neat black hair and wore round-lensed glasses. He wears a red bow tie in his shirt collar, a blue jumper and black shorts. His surname was not revealed until 1994.

However, this was changed in issue 3906 and the animated television series Dennis & Gnasher: Unleashed!.

== Characterisation ==
Walter's personality and behaviour fluctuated, depending on the writer: he remained a diligent student and uninterested in playing sports, but he would be a spoilt mummy's boy in one story, then a whiny coward who was scared of rain in another. Some stories featured Walter being courageous enough to create pranks and traps to irritate or frame Dennis, and other stories showed Dennis and/or Gnasher intimidating him for their entertainment, with Walter too scared and startled to fight back.

When the 1996 Dennis the Menace cartoon adaptation aired on CBBC, Walter became a snob and his friends joined in on the stuck-up attitude towards Dennis' group. The behaviour remained in the comic strips.

== Personal life ==
The Beano had a notable generation jump with the Dennis the Menace and Minnie the Minx series after Dennis' parents changed into new designs, and his father was revealed as the original Dennis three years later. Despite this, Walter still lives with his mother and father, and his pets. In his original characterisation, a girl named Priscilla made a one-issue appearance and Dennis refers to her as Walter's sister, but she has not appeared since. In the 1996 cartoon, it was revealed Walter had an uncle who was a barber named Slasher obsessed with Dennis' hair. Walter's parents were always characterised as a wealthy couple who spoil their son, but Walter's post-2012 reincarnation shows his father, Wilbur, as the prideful, smug mayor of Beanotown, who was once Dennis' father's bullying target when they were children.

Walter is friends with other schoolboys who are as hardworking and unmanly like him, with similar hobbies. Originally, he had two friends; Spotty Perkins and Bertie Blenkinsop, but the magazine and children's cartoons have also been introduced. His girlfriend, Matilda, was a short-tempered redhead with a lisp who notably appeared in the 1996 cartoon; Walter was devoted to her to the point of implications she bossed him around.

== Relationship with Dennis ==
From his debut, Walter and Dennis the Menace have been enemies. Walter's nerdiness, as well as his hobbies, led to his nickname "Walter the Softy" (and his friends collectively dubbed "The Softies"), and often offends Dennis and Gnasher by his presence alone. Despite the tension and violence, Dennis has turned to Walter in desperation, such as when Gnasher disappeared for six issues in 1986, finding Gnipper's long-lost sisters when the puppy had been poisoned, helping Rasher win a pig race, and trying to save Dennis's favourite tree. They once find out the two are distant cousins, but it has only been mentioned once.

== Controversy ==
For an unspecified time, some former readers have assumed Walter was an unconfirmed-but-implied gay character for The Beano. The magazine's readership historically being young boys looking for masculine role models through characters that were superheroes, military personnel and brave adventurers automatically made male characters like Walter an ideal antagonist for the rebellious, school-hating, football-loving Dennis, but his violence towards Walter when he was not paying attention to him led to concerns, it would encourage children into homophobic bullying. Dennis' aggression towards Walter softened, and his antagonism increased, his post-2012 version wanting to rid Beanotown of all its fun, as well as his heterosexual relationship with Matilda. Beano spokesman, Mike Stirling, later said in 2013 Walter's post-2012 version would hopefully be "dramatically satisfying" reason for readers if Dennis turned violent because "[Walter Brown] does not want to be a kid, he wants to be a grownup and is always snitching on kids who are having fun."

== Parodies ==
- Walter is parodied in some editions of the adult comic Viz as "Cedric Soft" in the strip about popular character Biffa Bacon. Their relationship is in a similar vein to Walter's with Dennis, with extreme comic violence added.
- In the Judge Dredd story Judgement Day, the villain's origin was a pastiche of the Beano: Soppi Walter, routinely terrorised and attacked by the bully Big Den (surname shown as "Mennis"). Soppi turned out to be a sociopath and learned necromancy in order to kill, resurrect, and torture his bully.
- In April 2018, Beano Studios issued a cease and desist letter to Jacob Rees-Mogg, a prominent British right-wing Conservative MP with upper middle-class mannerisms, asserting that Rees-Mogg was imitating Walter.
