= Logan Murray =

British comedian

Logan Murray is a London-based stand-up comedian.

Murray has appeared on television shows including Peep Show, Packet of Three, London Underground, Pebble Mill, The Pallbearer's Revue, Channel Four's History of Swearing, The Greatest ***** Show on TV, Jerriatrick, People Like Us and Jimmy Perry's radio series London Calling. He was a member of the Experimental New Music group PULSE with Master of the King's Music Errollyn Wallen, Soprano Fiona Baines, composer Howard Haigh, and London Electricity frontman Tony Colman. He has also hosted two children's TV shows: Connect Four and Virtually Impossible. He wrote and presented two series of Karaoke Fishtank, the late night music show on Channel 4. He directed all three stage shows of We Are Klang.

Logan Murray is also known by his character alter-ego Ronnie Rigsby and for collaborating with Jerry Sadowitz in the show Bib and Bob. Later in his career, Logan Murray joined forces with The Amused Moose Comedy Club to create the 'Stand Up and Deliver' comedy course. He has also authored a teach yourself book on stand up comedy. The course has been taken by some professional and famous comedians including Greg Davies and Rhod Gilbert.
