= Rasher (comics) =

British comic strip character

- The Beano character
- First appearance: "1920"; 5 May 1979
- Last appearance: "4253"; 14 September 2024

In-universe information
- Full name: Rasher

Rasher is a British comic strip published in the comics magazine The Beano, featuring Dennis the Menace's pet pig Rasher. It was initially drawn by David Sutherland and published five years after the character's first appearance. Due to The Beano's 2012 continuity, Rasher's daughter (also named Rasher) has succeeded the role, particularly in Dennis And Gnasher: Unleashed!.

== Character background ==
Rasher is a pig obsessed with food, either seen eating it (usually by stealing the food from an unsuspecting human) or daydreaming about it. A method of attack to get the food is by either butting humans or racing past them quick enough so they fail to notice their food has disappeared.

== Publication history ==
=== Introduction to The Beano ===
Rasher made his first appearance in The Beano in issue 1920 in Dennis the Menace and Gnasher. Dennis and Gnasher walk by a farm and notice the farmer's pig used its trough to prank him. Dennis is intrigued and successfully takes the pig off the relieved farmer's hands, naming it Rasher. (Note: Dennis acknowledges his two pets' names (Gnasher and Rasher) rhyme, but "Rasher" is most likely a reference to a rasher (i.e. a bacon slice).)

=== Rasher comic strip ===
Rasher received his eponymous comic strip in issue 2201, illustrated by Dave Sutherland. It is notable of being the last comic strip published with Harold Cramond as Beano chief-editor. Early stories also featured Rasher's family, such his brother Hamlet, his sister Virginia Ham, Uncle Crackling and Little Piglet, who were all introduced in the first episode. The series ran for over a decade in over 500 issues, and ended in 1995.

From issue 3480, older Rasher strips were reprinted in full colour in The Beano. Lew Stringer helmed the reboot from issue 3660, which was a part of the Funsize Funnies section. This new series has appeared infrequently throughout the 2010s.

=== Subsequent appearances ===
Rasher has appeared in Dennis' comic strips sporadically, unlike Dennis' other pet, Gnasher, who stars in every issue (apart from a few issues in 1986). Rasher is absent in the Dennis the Menace cartoon adaptations (besides a cameo in the episode of the 1996 series episode Dennis and the Beanstalk), notably not appearing in 2009's Dennis and Gnasher, despite the cartoon featuring Dennis' grandmother having a pet pig named Harley. Eventually, Rasher returned in Beano 3601, featuring in Dennis and Gnasher alongside Harley.

Issue 3649 shifted Beano's continuity as Gok Wan gave Dennis' parents a makeover, which was later revealed that Dennis' father turned into the original Dennis who had grown up, married and had his own children. Stringer's Rasher reboot implies this change does not affect Rasher, but in the franchise retooling for Dennis and Gnasher: Unleashed!, the Rasher who appears in the cartoon is black and white like a cow, and revealed as the daughter of the Rasher the original Dennis owned. Unlike her father, she prefers eating turnips.

As of September 2024, Rasher's last appearance in The Beano was in issue 4253.

==== In Beano media ====
Rasher appears in other parts of Beano's franchise. In The Beano Annuals, Rasher's stories have appeared from 1986 to 1989's editions, but Rasher actually appeared a few annuals earlier in Rasher-themed puzzle games in 1984's and 1985's. The Rasher series mostly appeared in 1983's, 1985's and 1987's Beano Summer Specials.

The new Rasher appeared in the 2014 annual, where she was drawn by David Sutherland.
