= List of Dandy comic strips by annual =

Gallery of strips in eight different Dandy annuals.

== The Dandy Book 1978 ==
- Peter's Pocket Grandpa
- The Jocks and the Geordies
- Desperate Dan
- Black Bob
- Korky the Cat
- Jack Silver
- Dirty Dick
- Desperate Dawg
- Screwy Driver
- Bully Beef and Chips
- The Smasher
- Izzy Skint
- Greedy Pigg
- Winker Watson
- Brassneck
- Rah-Rah Randall

== The Dandy Book 1992 ==
- Keyhole Kate
- Korky and the Kits
- Cuddles and Dimples
- Dandy Doodles
- Smasher
- Brassneckio
- The Geordielocks and the Five Bears
- Mutt and Moggy
- Postman Patel
- Winker Watson
- Bully Beef and Chips
- Desperate Dan Hikes with the Horrors
- Bananaman
- Dinah Mo
- Iron Fish
- The Incredible T-Shirt
- Tristan
- The Hunt for The Loch Ness Monster

== The Dandy Annual 2004 ==
- Desperate Dan
- Cuddles and Dimples
- Ollie Fliptrik
- Molly
- Fiddle O Diddle
- Korky the Cat
- Winker Watson
- Jak and Spike
- Owen Goal
- Tin Lizzie
- Strange Hill School
- Blinky
- P5
- Brain Duane
- Beryl the Peril
- Puss n Boots
- James At School Fete
- Bananaman
- Marvo the Wonder Chicken
- Never Ready Eddie!
- The Comet
- Willy Wind-Up!

== The Dandy Annual 2008 ==
- Jak
- Cuddles and Dimples
- Dreadlock Holmes
- My Own Genie
- Ted and the Animals
- Blinky
- Winker Watson
- Desperate Dan
- Beryl the Peril
- Bananaman
- Hyde and Shriek
- Ollie Fliptrik
- Corporal Clott
- Pinky's Crackpot Circus

== The Dandy Annual 2009 ==
- Desperate Dan
- Cuddles & Dimples
- Jak & Todd
- Korky the Cat
- Brassneck
- Ollie Fliptrik
- Hyde N Shriek
- Puss N Boots
- Ninja Number 9
- Beryl the Peril
- Bananaman
- Gizmo!
- Owen Goal
- Winker Watson

== The Dandy Annual 2010 ==
- Desperate Dan
- Bananaman
- Jak and Todd
- Cuddles and Dimples
- Beryl the Peril
- Lucy Grimm
- Marvo the Wonder Chicken
- Puss N Boots
- Blinky
- Ollie Fliptrik
- Korky the Cat
- Jumbo of the Jungle
- Hyde and Shriek

== The Dandy Annual 2011 ==
- Desperate Dan
- Blinky
- Jak and Todd
- Bananaman
- Ollie Fliptrik
- Owen Goal
- Agent Dog 2 Zero
- Cuddles and Dimples
- Korky the Cat
- Marvo the Wonder Chicken
- Bully Beef & Chips
- Puss N Boots
- Brassneck

== The Dandy Annual 2012 ==
- Korky the Cat
- Blinky
- Ways of the Historical Meerkats
- Bananaman
- Bully Beef and Chips
- Corporal Clott
- Desperate Dan in the USA
- Fiddle O Diddle
- Beryl the Peril
- George Vs Dragon
- Winker Watson
- Puss and Boots
- Jak and Todd
- Brain Duane
- Strange Hill School
- Kid Cops
- Brassneck
- Ollie Fliptrik
- Cuddles & Dimples
- Agent Dog 2 Zero
- The Blue Blobs

== The Dandy Annual 2016 ==
=== Comics ===
- Desperate Dan
- Winker Watson
- Smasher
- Korky the Cat
- Brassneck
- Bully Beef and Chips
- Keyhole Kate
- Desperate Dawg
- Fiddle O'Diddle
- Corporal Clott
- Jack Silver
- George vs Dragon
- The Jocks and the Geordies
- Greedy Pigg
- Beryl the Peril
- Big Head and Thick Head
- Cuddles and Dimples

=== Picture Stories ===
- Black Bob

=== Text stories ===
- What I Did on My Holidays by Winker Watson
