= Fun Size Comics =

DC Thomson comic book spin-offs

The Fun Size Beano and Fun Size Dandy were small-format, full-colour children's comics, originally published four times monthly by DC Thomson and Co. Ltd between 1997 and 2010. They replaced the Beano and Dandy Comic Libraries, originally printed in red, white and black and published from 1982 to 1997. The Beano Comic Libraries lasted for 368 issues and their Dandy counterparts lasted for 344 issues. There were also comic library specials, The Beano Comic Library Specials being puzzle books and lasting for 87 issues (1988–1994) and the Dandy Comic Library Specials being cartoon books, featuring a number of single page comic strips and these lasted for 88 issues (1987–1994).

The comics were spin-offs of the weekly comics, The Beano and The Dandy. Two of each title would appear each month; they later appeared one Beano and one Dandy Fun Size every fortnight, rather than two of each at a time. This meant there were now two extra issues of each title per year.

As of 2006 two comics a month were reprints from the 1990s, but as of 2007 all four became reprint-only. Fun Size Beano and Fun Size Dandy were both discontinued in November 2010 due to low sales.

== Special version ==
For a period, if readers joined The Beano Club, subscribers would receive a special version of a Fun Size Beano, called the Beano Club Special. This was originally printed in 1999, and contained some reprints from 1980s annuals, alongside some new strips by Barrie Appleby and Nigel Parkinson.

== Characters in Fun Size Beano ==
- Ball Boy
- Dennis the Menace
- Ivy the Terrible
- Minnie the Minx
- The Bash Street Kids
- Billy Whizz
- Roger the Dodger
- Les Pretend
- The Numskulls
- Little Plum
- Tim Traveller
- Bash Street Bugs
- Bea occasionally.
- Biffo
- Stunt Boy
- Lester the Jester
- Erbert from the Bash Street Kids.

== Characters in Fun Size Dandy ==
- Desperate Dan
- Puss 'n' Boots
- Beryl the Peril
- Cuddles and Dimples
- Owen Goal
- Blinky
- Bananaman
- Cowrin Wolf
- Strange Hill School
- Desperate Dawg
- P5

== Additional characters from other comics ==
- I Spy (Sparky)
- Dreamy Daniel (Sparky)
- Badd Lads (The Beezer)
- Tiny (Topper)
- Scoopy (Nutty)

== Characters who were exclusive to Fun Size Comics ==
- Marzipan King of the Jungle,
- Salty Sam,
- Luncheon Vulture,
- Stunt Boy drawn by Nick Brennan
- Lester the Jester.

== See also ==
- List of DC Thomson publications
