= List of DC Thomson publications =

This is a list of DC Thomson publications; formerly D. C. Thomson & Co., of Dundee, Scotland.

== Newspapers, comics and magazines ==
These newspapers, comics and magazines are or were published by D.C. Thomson & Co.

=== Current ===
- 110% Gaming (2014–present)
- The Beano (1938–present)
- Commando Comics (1961–present)
- The Courier (1801–present)
- Evening Telegraph (1905–present)
- The People's Friend (1869–present)
- The Scots Magazine (1739–1826, 1888–1893, 1924–present)
- The Sunday Post (1936–present)
- WWE Kids Magazine (2008–present)

=== Former ===
- Adventure (1921–1961)
- Annabel (1965–1981)
- Animal Planet (2011–2023)
- Animals & You (1998–2023)
- The Beezer (1956–1990)
- Beezer and Topper (1990–1993)
- The Best of Beezer (1988–1996)
- The Best of Topper (1988–1996)
- Blue Jeans (1980–1991)
- Bucky O'Hare (1992)
- Buddy (1981–1983)
- Bullet (1976–1978)
- Bunty (1958–2001)
- Buzz (1973–1975)
- Champ (1984–1985)
- Classic Stitches
- Classics from the Comics (1996–2010)
- Cracker (1975–1976)
- The Crunch (1979–1980)
- The Dandy (1937–2012) (renamed Dandy Xtreme between 2007–2010)
- Danger Mouse (2015)
- Debbie (1976–78), a girls' comic
- Diana (1963–76) – a girls' comic
- The Dixon Hawke Library (1919–41)
- Emma (1978–79), a girls' comic, combined with Judy in 1979)
- EPIC Magazine (2007–2019)
- Evergreen (1985–2023)
- Football Picture Story Monthly (1986–2003)
- The Fun Size Beano (1996–2010)
- The Fun Size Dandy (1996–2010)
- Goodie Bag Mag (2003–2011)
- Hoot (1985–1986)
- The Hotspur (1933–1981; from 1959–1963 called New Hotspur)
- Jackie (1964–1993), a girls' comic
- Judy (1960–2001)
- Living Magazine (2020–2023)
- The Magic Comic (1939–1941)
- Mandy (1967–1991)
- My Weekly
- Nickelodeon Magazine (2011–2016)
- No.1 Magazine (2015–2020)
- Nutty (1980–1985)
- Platinum Magazine (2019–2023)
- Plug (1977–1979)
- The Rover (1922–1973)
- Shout (1993–2023)
- Shout Secrets (2008)
- Shout Social (2015)
- Shout Summer (2008–2010)
- The Skipper (1930–1941)
- Sparky (1965–1977)
- Spike (1983–1984)
- Starblazer (1979–1991)
- Suzy (1982–1987)
- The Topper (1953–1990)
- Tracy (1979–1985), a girls' comic, combined with Judy in 1985
- TV Tops (1981–1984) (originally titled Tops)
- Twinkle (1968–1999)
- The Vanguard (1923–1926)
- The Victor (1961–1994)
- Vlogmas (2017)
- The Wizard (1922–1963, 1970–1978)
- Warlord (1974–1986)
- The Weekly News

== Annuals ==
The annuals are normally published in time for Christmas, which is the major gift selling time of the year, usually appearing on shelves in early September. The annuals that DC Thomson have published, or still publish, over the years, include:

=== Current ===
- 70 Years of The Beano and The Dandy (1988–present)
- Animals and You (2008–present)
- The Beano Annual (1940–present)
- The Broons (1940–present)
- Classic Broons and Oor Wullie annuals (1996–present)
- The Dandy Annual (1939–present)
- Oor Wullie (1941–present)
- Storytime with Grandma (2008–present)

=== Former ===
- Bananaman (1984–1987)
- The Bash Street Kids (1980–2010)
- The Beezer Book (1958–2003)
- Beryl the Peril (1959–1977, 1981, 1987–1988)
- Black Bob (1950–1965)
- Blue Jeans Annual (1970–90s)
- Bunty Annual (1960–2009)
- Cowboy Book For Boys (1938)
- Dennis the Menace Annual (1956–2011)
- Desperate Dan Annual (1955, 1979, 1991–1993)
- Dixon Hawke's Case Book (1938–1953)
- Mandy Annual (1969–2007)
- The Sparky Book (1967–1981)
- The Topper Book (1955–1994)
- Willie Waddle Book (1930–50s)

== See also ==
- List of magazines published in Scotland
