= Marvo the Wonder Chicken =

British comic strip and television series

- Comic strip character(s) from The Dandy

Publication information
- Current/last artist: Nigel Parkinson
- First appearance: Issue N/A (1990)
- Last appearance: 2010
- Also appeared in: The Dandy Annual

Characters
- Regular characters: Marvo, Henry Thrapplewhacker the Forty Ninth

Marvo the Wonder Chicken is a character in the UK comic The Dandy. The strip first appeared in 1990 and continued in odd issues until 1999. He returned in 2008 to tie in with the planned DC Thomson TV series. The strip is "silent", with only words such like "Crash" and "Bang", and ending with Marvo saying "Ta-da".

The strip was originally drawn by Syd Kitching, then by Jim Hansen; it took up half a page in the comic, and either one or two pages in the annuals. Jim Hansen was also drawing Jak and P5 for The Dandy, and Buster for his self-titled comic. When the strip returned in Dandy Xtreme 18 years later, it was drawn by Nigel Parkinson, who at the time was also drawing Dennis the Menace, Bea and Ivy the Terrible for The Beano, Dennis and Gnasher for BeanoMAX, and Cuddles and Dimples for the Dandy. It was dropped after Dandy Xtreme reverted to just The Dandy, with Marvo taking his final bow in issue 3507, dated 9 October 2010. He returned in issue 3515, dated 18 December 2010, but has not returned since.

An animated version of the comic strip appeared in 2010, with 51 episodes.

== TV series ==
Marvo the Wonder Chicken
- Genre: Comedy; Slapstick; Fantasy; Animated sitcom
- Country of origin: United Kingdom
- No. of seasons: 2
- No. of episodes: 51

Production
- Production companies: Red Kite Animation; The Dandy; Jetix Europe

Original release
- Network: Jetix
- Release: 2008 – 2009
- Network: Disney XD
- Release: February 27, 2010 – 2010

Marvo the Wonder Chicken is a British animated television series that aired in 2010. The show follows Marvo, a daring and eccentric chicken, and his enthusiastic assistant Henry Thrapplewhacker XLIX, as they attempt to put on the "Greatest Show on Earth". The series was produced by Red Kite Animation and originally aired on Jetix. It was based on a comic strip from The Dandy, which first appeared in 1990.

The show was originally broadcast on Jetix, and after it was discontinued, it continued airing on Cartoon Network, Boomerang and later on Cartoon Network in Latin America from 2011 to 2013, followed by Boomerang Latin America from 2014 until its shutdown on March 31, 2022.
