= Corporal Clott =

British comic strip

- Comic strip character(s) from The Dandy

Publication information
- Creator(s): David Law
- Other contributors: Steve Bright
- Current/last artist: Nigel Auchterlounie
- First appearance: Issue 990 (12 November 1960)
- Last appearance: The Dandy Annual 2012
- Also appeared in: The Dandy Annual

Main Character
- Name: Clarence Clott
- Alias(es): Corporal Clott

Characters
- Regular characters: Colonel Grumbly

Corporal Clott was a strip in the British comic The Dandy. It started in the issued dated 12 November 1960 (issue 990) and was drawn by Dennis the Menace artist David Law. The strip was drawn by David Law until issue 1496 dated 25 July 1970. The strip continued after David Law left it with these strips being drawn by Bully Beef and Chips artist Jimmy Hughes. Jimmy Hughes version of the strip ended in the 1970s however the strip was revived in 1987 by Steve Bright and later dropped again. The character was also featured in a few Dandy Comic Libraries devoted entirely to him. The strip reappeared in the 2012 Dandy Annual, drawn by Nigel Auchterlounie and later appeared in the comic in late 2012 again drawn by Nigel Auchterlounie.

The tales revolved around Corporal Clott's bungling exploits, which often brought the entire Army to its knees: or at least, the vast base that he resided at. His superior, the bulky, beefy Colonel Grumbly was an aggressive, dominant authority figure who often bore the brunt of Clott's innocent-but-chaotic misdemeanours. Most of the action centred in the Army camp itself, and rarely ventured into the outside world. The accident-prone Corporal was often seen driving an Army Jeep, with the oft-viewed ICU2 number-plate.

== In popular culture ==
=== Music ===
- on The Damned's 1980 LP, The Black Album, Corporal Clott is mentioned alongside Zorro and Adam Chance in the song "The History of the World, Part 1", which was also released as a single. They also mention him in their song from the album Phantasmagoria, "Edward The Bear".
