= Billy the Cat (British comics) =

British comic character from The Beano

- Adventure story character(s) from The Beano
- William Grange in his Billy the Cat "cat suit", illustrated by David Sutherland.

Publication information
- Stars in: Billy the Cat (1967–1970, 2003, 2005, 2008); Billy the Cat and Katie (1971–1974)
- Author(s): Uncredited
- Illustrator(s): David Sutherland (1967–1969); Sandy Calder (1970–1974); Wayne Thompson (2003); Nigel Dobbyn (2005); Laura Howell (2008); Barrie Appleby (2008)
- First appearance: Issue 1289 (1 April 1967)
- Last appearance: Issue ?? (c. December 2008)
- Current status: Discontinued
- Character timeline: Issues 1289 – 1332, 1373 – 1412, 1456 – 1494, 1522 – 1550, 1637 – 1677, 3195 – 3200, 3301 – 3308, 3443, 3454 – ??

Also appeared in
- Beano works: The Beano Annual 1969–1975, 2003–2008, 2010, 2011; The Beano Summer Special 1968, 1970, 1972, 1973, 1988
- DC Thomson works: The Dandy (issue 2396, 2404, 2409, 2415, [2013 digital revival]); Buddy (issues 1–128); Classics from the Comics (issue 171)

Main Character
- Name: Billy the Cat
- Alias(es): William Grange
- Occupation: Student
- Powers: "Superhuman" abilities
- Family: Kathleen / Katie [the] Cat (cousin); Mabel (aunt)

Characters
- Type of group: Vigilantes
- Members: Billy the Cat
- Other members: Katie [the] Cat

Billy the Cat is a fictional character first published in the British comic magazine The Beano in 1967. He is a vigilante dressed in a "cat suit" who stars in his eponymous adventure story, and occasionally teams with Katie Cat. A popular character, Billy the Cat is a prolific figure in DC Thomson's comic magazines, his character appearing in a variety of series and issues of non-Beano magazines.

== Background ==
In The Beano's 1967 Easter issue, a DC Thomson advert announced a new superhero would feature in the magazine soon. The advert read: "Look at this chap! It's the amazing Billy the Cat! Follow his strange, exciting adventures in the big city—starting in The Beano next week!" as the artwork depicted a figure in a black outfit running across a roof. Superheroes were not new to The Beano, but Billy the Cat's pre-production developments are unknown. Lew Stringer noted Billy the Cat published when the Batman television adaptation aired, but the character having a secret identity as a schoolboy was similar to Spider-Man's characterisation.

== Synopsis ==
William Grange is the orphaned son of police officers who died in a car accident. He lives with his Aunt Mabel and attends Burnham Academy, but he is inspired by his parents' legacy to fight crime as well. When his peers are distracted, he disguises as a masked vigilante to help Burnham's police force catch criminals in his town. The disguise, Billy the Cat, is a catsuit and a hard helmet with cat ears, whiskers, and/or designed with eyes on the front. As the disguise, Grange becomes superhumanly agile: jumping off the ground onto roofs, and somersaulting great lengths; and strong enough to defeat adult criminals in hand-to-hand combat. His gadget rucksack is also well-equipped with gadgets, as well as rope and grappling hooks so he can swing around the town. The police and the armed forces admire the hero, willingly following his lead and are inspired by his fighting techniques.

== Publication history ==
=== Official runs ===
Billy the Cat was part of The Beano's adventure story genre: text comics with photorealistic artwork of adventure stories starring men and boys who depicted hobbies and interests the male readers stereotypically had. Although the genre had featured in the magazine since the first issue, the paragraphs of text under each panel would eventually become unpopular with readers who preferred the visual and humorous comic strips. Grange would become the last adventure story character to debut in the magazine but his Billy the Cat stories looked similar to an American superhero comic. Stories were episodic, rarely expanding beyond one issue, and authors were uncredited, but the artists have been retroactively revealed.

The first series spanned from issues 1289 to 1332, drawn by David Sutherland. The second and third series was illustrated by frequent adventure story artist Sandy Calder (also illustrated for General Jumbo and Danny's Deep-Sea Iron Fish). The third series finished in 1971 in issue 1494. Thirty-two years later, Billy the Cat reappeared in issue 3195 with a new series designed by Wayne Thomson, which ran for a month until issue 3200. Nigel Dobbyn illustrated the 2005 nine-issue reboot, and Barrie Appleby illustrated the 2008 reboot, which featured after Laura Howell's one-off strip from the 70th anniversary issue.

Grange would return in his original 20th century run in Billy the Cat and Katie. Illustrated by Sandy Calder, Grange is joined by his cousin Kathleen, whose parents are visiting the United States and is sent to stay with him until they return. She is made Katie the Cat (sometimes Katie Cat) with an identical uniform, and identical abilities and gadgets. The stories had two series that finished Billy the Cat's 20th century sagas, ending in issue 1677. The second was the only serialised story Billy the Cat would have in the magazine, in which Kathleen and William go on a school trip cruise.

=== Subsequent appearances ===
==== The Beano ====
The superhuman vigilante did not stop featuring in the Beano franchise after he disappeared in 1974. The Billy the Cat stories have featured frequently in The Beano Annual from since 1969. 2008's edition was a notorious three-part story where Billy the Cat discovers the antagonist is General Jumbo, mind-controlled by his army model Private Pike. 2010's edition featured William the Cat, a similar-themed superhero strip set in the Victorian era, revealed to be Grange's imagination during a school trip to a museum. He and Katie Cat joined 253 characters on a double-page spread in 2019's annual in celebration of the 80th anniversary.

He also appeared in The Beano Summer Specials of 1968, 1970, 1972, 1973, and 1988.

==== DC Thomson ====
Grange's series has been revived frequently throughout DC Thomson's history, notably showing him in other stages in his life. Although Grange (and cousin Kathleen)'s age was never specified, Buddy's Billy the Cat series depicted him as looking notably older, possibly his late teens, and the story relocated to Marham, finishing in issue 128.

In 2013, The Digital Dandy's shared universe story Retro Active featured Kathleen in her Katie Cat persona joining the superhero team, and an adult William had a supporting role, revealing he was now a police officer in charge of the force's Costumed Crime Division. Years before, Billy the Cat appeared in The Dandy's Comic Cuts section between November 1986 and March 1988.

A reprint featured in issue 171 of Classics from the Comics along with other reprints from several superheroes by DC Thomson.

== Reception and legacy ==
Billy the Cat and his series was popular enough to be passed amongst DC Thomson's children's magazines. However, readers became curious about Grange's history before his parents' deaths. Former reader David Carman wrote online fanfiction to give William and Kathleen an (unofficial) origin story, which DC Thomson approved.
