= Nigel Auchterlounie =

British comics artist and cartoonist

Nigel Auchterlounie is a British comics artist and cartoonist. His artwork featured heavily in the children's comic The Dandy, often writing the strips himself.

For the final print Dandy celebrating its 75th anniversary, Nigel drew The Bogies, My Freaky Family, Tom Tum, Bertie Buncle and his Chemical Uncle, Joe White and the Seven Dwarves, Old King Cole, Korky the Cat, and Jibber & Steve, as well as writing The Jocks and the Geordies.

In November 2012, Auchterlounie became the writer of Dennis the Menace as well as the writer/artist for Pup Parade for The Beano. Auchterlounie currently writes Dennis the Menace and Gnasher in both the weekly comic and in the Dennis the Menace and Gnasher Megazine. Auchterlounie both writes and draws The Numskulls.

Auchterlounie's graphic novel, Spleenal, was published by Blank Slate Books in 2009. His graphic novel Weak As I Am was published by Blank Slate in 2015.

== Children's comic work ==
| Comic Strip | Dates | Comic drawn for | Notes |
|---|---|---|---|
| Baa Baa Bad Sheep | 2012 | The Dandy | Mini-strip |
| The Bogies | 2008–2012 | The Dandy | Originally appearing in children's magazine Toxic |
| Clive 5 | 2010–2011 | The Dandy | |
| Corporal Clott | 2011, 2012 | The Dandy | First in the 2012 Annual, then in the weekly in late 2012 |
| The Dandy Presents... | 2012 | The Dandy | |
| Dennis the Menace and Gnasher | 2012–present | The Beano | Also appears in Dennis the Menace and Gnasher Megazine |
| Diary of a Bash Street Kid | 2014 | The Beano | Prose story |
| The Gleeks | 2011 | The Dandy | |
| Jibber & Steve | 2010–2013 | The Dandy | Originally half-pager, then mini-strip |
| My Freaky Family | 2011–2012 | The Dandy | |
| The Numskulls | 2013–present | The Beano | |
| Pup Parade | 2012–2013 | The Beano | Part of the Funsize Funnies |
| Professor Dandy's World of Facts | 2010–2011 | The Dandy | Mini-strip |
| Space Dogz | 2011 | The Dandy | |
| Superball | 2012 | The Dandy | Mini-strip |
| Twitter | 2010–2012 | The Dandy | Mini-strip |
