= The Bogies =

Comic strip

- Comic strip character(s) from The Dandy

Publication information
- Stars in: The Bogies
- First appearance: Issue XXXX (June 2008)
- Last appearance: The comic's physical demise
- Also appeared in: The Dandy Annual

Characters
- Regular characters: Bogey Won, Dr Goo, Snot Bothered, Hot Snot, Gobzilla, Frankenslime, Splatman and Gobin, Gobzilla

The Bogies is a comic strip in The Dandy and Turbo Extreme. It features bunches of nasal mucus and their adventures. Many of the characters names are twists on some famous person or character from pop culture. These characters will often act like celebrities but in a gross manner. It originally appeared in Toxic in 2005, but moved to The Dandy in June 2008. It was created by Paul Kell and Mark Greenbaum. The comic writer and illustrator is Nigel Auchterlounie. The last strip in Toxic was a Hock Hogan one, and the first Dandy one was a Splatman and Gobbin story.

== Collected editions ==
Two 56 page books have been given away in issues of The Dandy Xtreme which collect together a large number of stories from the series as well as adding facts, puzzles, jokes and posters. The books were titled The Bogies Exclusive Mini Mag! and The Bogies Exclusive Mini Mag: The Big Green Slimy One!.

== Merchandise ==
=== Toys ===
The Bogies are well known for a range of small collectable toys of the characters from the comics. These include Pocket Bogies, Giant Bogies and Bogie Key Chains.

=== Trading cards and stickers ===
Bogies Battle Cards is a trump trading card game featuring the characters from the franchise. Seven cards are in each pack and 100 cards to collect in total. There is also a sticker collection which builds up parts of comic strips in the album.

=== Other ===
Bogie Battle Cards, Collectible Keychains, 1" Pocket Bogies, Limited Edition 15" Johnny Snotten Vinyl Toy, Glow in the Dark PJ's, T-shirts and stationery were also produced.
