= Wee Eck =

Wee Eck is a Scots version of "Little Alex". It may refer to:

- A member of Wullie's gang in the Oor Wullie comic strip, from the Sunday Post
- One of the "Jocks" in the comic strip The Jocks and the Geordies, from The Dandy
- A nickname for Alex Salmond, First Minister of Scotland from 2007 to 2014
