= Fiddle O Diddle =

British comic strip

Fiddle O'Diddle
- Comic strip character(s) from The Dandy

Publication information
- Stars in: Fiddle O'Diddle
- First appearance: Issue XXXX (c. 1983)
- Last appearance: 2004
- Also appeared in: The Dandy Annual

Main Character
- Name: Fiddle O'Diddle

Characters
- Regular characters: Muldoon

Fiddle O' Diddle was a British comic strip in The Dandy about a mischievous leprechaun who liked to diddle people, especially the gypsy Muldoon. Muldoon was penniless and clothesless, and Diddle thrived off the gypsy's attempts to get his gold. The strip has awful geographical accuracy, with one of the characters once welcoming "our good neighbours, Cuba". The strip started in autumn 1993, and continued until the 2004 revamp, with it reappearing in the 2012 annual. The strip was drawn by Tom Paterson for the most part, and the 2012 annual story was drawn by Nik Holmes. He also appeared as an X Factor contestant being praised by Louis Walsh, in The Dandy that year.

== Ethnic controversy ==
In February 1999 calls were sent in to the Joe Duffy's Liveline Show complaining about the strip portraying the Irish as stupid. The offending strip saw Fiddle attempting to grow black puddings on a tree. The then Dandy editor, Morris Heggie, reacted to these comments saying "I got the idea for Fiddle O'Diddle at an Irish comic fair. Fiddle O'Diddle is the smartest leprechaun in Rathprune and most stories are about people trying to catch him to get a crock of gold." The accusations were proved unfounded.
