= Totally Gross Germs =

British comic strip

- Comic strip character(s) from The Beano

Publication information
- Stars in: Totally Gross Germs
- Other names: The Germs; The Germs: Totally Gross [title] (also featuring Ill Will) [title] (also starring Ill Will) [title] (with Ill Will)
- Creator(s): David Sutherland
- Current/last artist: Vic Neill
- First appearance: Issue 2374 (16 January 1988)
- Last appearance: 2012
- Also appeared in: The Beano Annual
- Current status: Discontinued

Main Character
- Name: Will
- Alias(es): Ill Will

Characters
- Regular characters: Ugly Jack Bacteria, Jeremy Germ, Iris the Virus, Aunty Biotic

The Germs is a comic strip in the UK comic The Beano. It first appeared in issue 2374, dated 16 January 1988, replacing the Rasher strip, where the characters had been introduced the previous week.

"Ill" Will, who the germs are infecting

The strip was about a boy called Will who had three germs inside him (Ugly Jack Bacteria, Jeremy Germ, and Iris the Virus), and they were constantly making Will ill, requiring many visits to the doctor. Iris' name later changed to Violet Virus.

The Germs were sometimes stopped in their tracks with a grown-up looking germ called Auntie Biotic (a pun on "antibiotic").

The strip was originally drawn by David Sutherland, and was taken over by Vic Neill later on. Around this time Will's name was added onto the title, the wording changing every so often, such as including (also featuring Ill Will), (also starring Ill Will) or (with Ill Will). Due to Neill's work on Billy Whizz and Tim Traveller, the strip appeared on an increasingly irregular basis in the late 1990s, and after Neill's death in 2000, it disappeared from The Beano. In 2004 it briefly returned with a new artist, Nigel Parkinson. However, the strip only made three appearances which were spread over the year, and was dropped once again.

It returned to the comic in October 2011 as reprints of the David Sutherland strips, and later Vic Neill reprints in April 2012, along with Number 13, this time retitled as Totally Gross Germs. The following month, they were retitled again, as "The Germs: Totally Gross".

In Issue 3618 they returned to their original title.
