= Stevie White =

British comics artist

Stevie White is a British comics artist who works under the pen name Stref. He has worked for The Beano and The Dandy, drawing Winker Watson, Dennis the Menace and The Bash Street Kids, and had a graphic novel for mature readers, Milk, published in 2009. He also draws the strip Raising Amy for PlayStation Comics and the iPhone. He also drew Chester, the Alien-chaser and Dallas Ditchwater for The Dandy in the 2000s.

In 2015, White created a graphic novel version of J.M. Barrie's Peter Pan.

In 2024, White created The Silence of Unicorns: A Tara Togs Adventure, a 66-page graphic novel published by ComicScene. Set in Nazi-invaded Belgium in 1940, and Scotland in present day, it is a homage in both graphic style and storyline to Hergé's The Adventures of Tintin, with teenage amateur photographer Tara Togs audaciously thwarting a complex art theft and forgery operation, resulting in her being offered a career in freelance news photography
