= Puss 'n' Boots (comics) =

- Comic strip character(s) from The Beano

Publication information
- Creator(s): John Geering
- First appearance: Issue XXXX ()
- Also appeared in: The Beano Annual
- Current status: Discontinued

Main Character
- Name: Puss 'n' Boots

Puss 'n' Boots was a British comic strip which ran in the UK comic magazine Sparky from 1969 to 1977 and later appeared in Topper and The Dandy. Most of the strips were drawn by John Geering. Some scripts were written by Morris Heggie, later to become editor of the Dandy.

== Concept ==
The strip's protagonists are Puss, a black anthropomorphic cat and Boots, a similarly humanoid brown dog. In the stories they are in a continuous state of conflict, as indicated by the strap-line "They Fight Like Cat and Dog". Most stories revolved around one of them playing a trick on the other, the recipient getting revenge and both fighting. The strip name is a pun on the pantomime Puss in Boots.

It was one of a few DC Thomson cartoons where dialogue was as important as the artwork, with Puss and Boots insulting each other elaborately.

Regular characters included Puss' baby nephew, Titch, whose speech largely consisted of the word 'Baggle', and from time to time the Scottish uncles, Uncle Hamish McToorie and Uncle Duncan McTavish.

== Later history ==
As its sales faltered Sparky was merged with Topper which also failed. From 1993 Puss 'n' Boots appeared infrequently in the Dandy before a long hiatus. The artist John Geering died in 1999. The strip ran in The Dandy for two spells in the early 2000s, drawn by Barrie Appleby, who also drew Cuddles and Dimples, before being dropped when the comic was revamped in October 2004.

From 2008 new strips appeared in The Dandy and older strips were reprinted in Classics from the Comics. Puss 'n' Boots appear in the Dandy Annual 2009, drawn by Nigel Parkinson. They also feature in the 2012 annual drawn by Nigel Auchterlounie.

Similarly themed strips appeared in The Dandy in the 1980s, called Mutt and Moggy which was also drawn by John Geering, and in The Beano in the 2010s under the name Meebo and Zuky.
