= Winker Watson =

British comic strip

Winker Watson is a British comic strip created by Eric Roberts, which debuted in the comic magazine The Dandy in 1961. It terminated its run only in 2007 and was revived in 2012. The fictional character Winker Watson is a pupil at Greytowers School with a reputation for being "The World's Wiliest Wangler".

== Concept ==
Winker first appeared in the 1961 Dandy Book (published September 1960), and then appeared in the weekly Dandy on 1 April 1961 in issue Number 1010, and was quickly established as a character of great wit and appeal. Probably modeled on the Greyfriars stories and on Harry Wharton, Winker is a pupil of the Third Form of Greytowers Boarding School, he is known as the "wangler" of the school, constantly playing tricks and avoiding unpleasant school activities, much to the chagrin of his teacher Mr Clarence Creep (known to the boys as Creepy). Creep also has a sister called Agnes, who runs the nearby Trinity Hall Girls School, constructed in 1989 after the previous one burnt down. Around that area there also seems to be a St Jennifer's School for Girls, though this may just be a continuity error. Greytowers is next door to a police training school, although this was later reportedly abandoned and derelict.

Winker Watson is a rare breed for a kids comic, as his stories are often continuous from issue to issue, including the long-running saga of his uncle Arnold arriving as Physical Training instructor and Winker's endless attempts to get rid of him. There was also the long-running story dealing with the unjust expulsion of Winker's younger brother Wally, and the elder sibling's attempts to keep him in the school until the end of term so their parents would know nothing until he had been exonerated. A third example is that of Mr Creep's own secret stowaway; the teacher's good-for-nothing twin brother John, who was on the run and needed somewhere to stay, forced his brother to let him hide in his own quarters within the school. Other storylines involved Slasher Scragg (a delinquent boy recruited by the school staff and posing as a pupil to act as their spy on Winker's activities) and 'the phantom of Greytowers' (an elusive figure causing trouble for which Winker and his friends often got the blame; it turned out to be a teenage boy in hiding after escaping from a young offenders' institute). The early 90s saw perhaps the most bizarre running story of the strip's history, as Greytowers was invaded by aliens, who used mind control powers to take over several characters and tried to cast the school adrift in space, until Winker used the aliens' allergy to pig swill to defeat them. Stories throughout 2003 and 2004 were reworkings of 1970s scripts concerning Winker's schemes to foil the plans of Robin Boodle, a consistently annoying rich boy, and who had been renamed Darby Doshman (in the late 1980s, there was a similar reworking in which the rich boy became Jonathan Dosh). At the same time, Classics from the Comics was reprinting the Robin Boodle strips, sometimes in the same week. An old days storyline of a circus moving in next to the school was also redone, although it is unknown if any specific strips were reworked.

Winker's best pal is a lad called Tim Trott (nicknamed "Trotty" by Winker), though, apart from Winker's other friends Sally and Sandy, no other characters have emerged with any great regularity, despite the number of boys within the school. The headmaster has made frequent appearances, but mainly with Creep rather than any of the boys. Also occasionally seen is the school cook, nicknamed Cookie. In the late-1970s and early-1980s, Winker have frequent run-ins with three Sixth Formers called The Hoods. They dressed in long white coats and masks similar to the ones used by the Ku Klux Klan to hide their identities. They would steal and play tricks on the lower years and occasionally beat up Winker and his friends. As they were older and bigger than the third form boys, Winker would have to use his wits rather than his fists to fight against them. Though Winker often got into trouble, he always managed to wangle his way out of getting caned, well almost. Just the once he did get "six".

Comparisons with Just William are inevitable, including the fact that Winker is always in Form 3, no matter how much time passes, and stories often involve ends and beginnings of new school terms.

== History ==
The strip was drawn by Eric Roberts until his death in 1982. Afterwards, the strip ran mostly as reprints for the rest of the decade (though Tom Williams and Evi De Bono drew strips for the Dandy annuals), until Terry Bave took over. For the first few years he drew in the style of Roberts (though his style was still fairly noticeable), but as the 90s progressed his style became more and more noticeable. He was drawing the strip in his own style. Bave continued drawing it until 2002, when Stevie White took over, producing the strip regularly until 2007, with further appearances in the 2012 Annual. Wilbur Dawbarn took over from the 2013 Annual, with an ironic, tongue-in-cheek take on the character. In the 2018 Annual, Wilbur was replaced by Irish Cartoonist Alan Ryan.

== In popular culture ==
The strip also has been a target of satire with wordplay by alternative comedians and other, involving phrases such as "Wanker Watson", and playing on the perception of boarding schools being full of sexually frustrated teenage aristocrats. For instance, Viz comic ran a parody strip called Wanker Watson. There is also a British racehorse called Winker Watson after the character.

== See also ==
- The Dandy
- British comics
