= David Sutherland (comics) =

Scottish illustrator and comics artist (1933–2023)

David Sutherland OBE
- Self-portrait with Biffo the Bear
- Born: 4 March 1933; Invergordon, Scotland
- Died: 19 January 2023 (aged 89)
- Known for: Illustrator, The Beano
- Notable work: The Bash Street Kids, Dennis the Menace, Fred's Bed
- Movement: British comics

David Sutherland OBE (4 March 1933 – 19 January 2023) was a Scottish illustrator and comics artist with DC Thomson, responsible for The Bash Street Kids (1962–2023), Dennis the Menace (1970–1998), Fred's Bed (2008–2012) for The Beano, and the second version of Jak for The Dandy in the early 2000s.

== Early life ==
Sutherland was born in Invergordon, Scotland. He was the youngest of three children and the family moved to Stirling after the death of his mother.

== Career ==
Sutherland started out as an adventure strip artist, drawing strips such as The Beano's The Great Flood of London in 1960–61 (reprinted in Classics from the Comics in 2007) and Billy the Cat (see), before replacing Leo Baxendale as the artist for The Bash Street Kids, who were given the two pages in the centre of the comic at the same time. He was the strip's main artist since then, during which time he had drawn more than 2000 individual strips for the weekly comic. He also replaced Dudley D. Watkins on Biffo the Bear after his death in 1969, and continued to draw the character through the 1970s, after his strip relinquished that cover of the comic to Dennis in 1974.

In 1977, Gnasher was given his own strip in the Beano, Gnasher's Tale, which like the main Dennis strip was drawn by Sutherland. Similarly, when Dennis's pet pig, Rasher, received his own page in 1984, Sutherland was again the strip's artist, as he was when Gnasher's Tale was replaced by Gnasher and Gnipper in 1986. Sutherland began to draw The Germs for the comic in 1988, although in the early 1990s he was replaced by Vic Neill. He also stopped drawing Gnasher and Gnipper in 1992, with artistic duties being handed to Barry Glennard.

In 1998, Sutherland stopped drawing Dennis the Menace after 28 years, handing over to David Parkins, although he continued to draw the Bash Street Kids. Over the next few years, he drew Korky the Cat for the Dandy, as well as the second incarnation of Jak.

In 2009 it was confirmed that he was the new artist for the Beano's Fred's Bed strip. Initially taking over for a three-month period as replacement for Hunt Emerson, he later shared the workload with Tom Paterson before taking over as the strip's main artist during 2011.

Sutherland sometimes drew himself into strips, such as Biffo in the 2010 annual.

To mark Sutherland's 50 years as illustrator of the Bash Street Kids, an exhibition of original artwork from D C Thomson's collections was held at the University of Dundee from June to August 2012, with the artist appearing for a Q&A event on 13 June.

Sutherland was appointed Officer of the Order of the British Empire (OBE) in the 2023 New Year Honours for services to illustration.

Sutherland died on 19 January 2023, at the age of 89.

== Comic strips ==
The Bash Street Kids

The strips that Sutherland drew for DC Thomson over the years include:

Comic Strip	Dates	Comic drawn for	Type of strip	Notes
The Bash Street Kids	1962–2023	The Beano	Comic strip	Sutherland drew over 3,000 sets for this strip, a record for a Beano artist on a single strip.
Biffo the Bear	1969–1971	The Beano	Comic strip	
Billy the Cat and Katie	1967–1974	The Beano	Adventure strip	
Danny on a Dolphin	1960 & 1962	The Beano	Adventure strip	Sutherland's first strip for The Beano.
Dennis the Menace	1970–1998	The Beano, BeanoMAX	Comic strip	Took over from David Law from issue 1464, dated 8 August 1970.
General Jumbo	1962–1963	The Beano	Adventure strip	Sutherland drew the third, fourth and fifth series of this adventure strip.
The Germs	1988–1992	The Beano	Comic strip	Later taken over by Vic Neill, and reprinted under the name 'Totally Gross Germs' between October 2011 and August 2012.
The Great Flood of London	1960–1961	The Beano	Adventure strip	
Korky the Cat	1999–2000	The Dandy	Comic strip	
Lester's Little Circus	1962–1963	The Beano	Adventure strip	
Rasher	1984–1995	The Beano	Comic Strip	Ran regularly between 1984 and 1988, then appeared sporadically. These strips were later reprinted in 2009.
Fred's Bed	2008–2012	The Beano	Comic Strip	Sutherland drew the strip in David Parkins' style for The Beano's 70th birthday issue in 2008, and in late 2009 became one of the strip's main artists, this time basing Fred's design on Hunt Emerson's version.
