= Nigel Parkinson =

British cartoonist

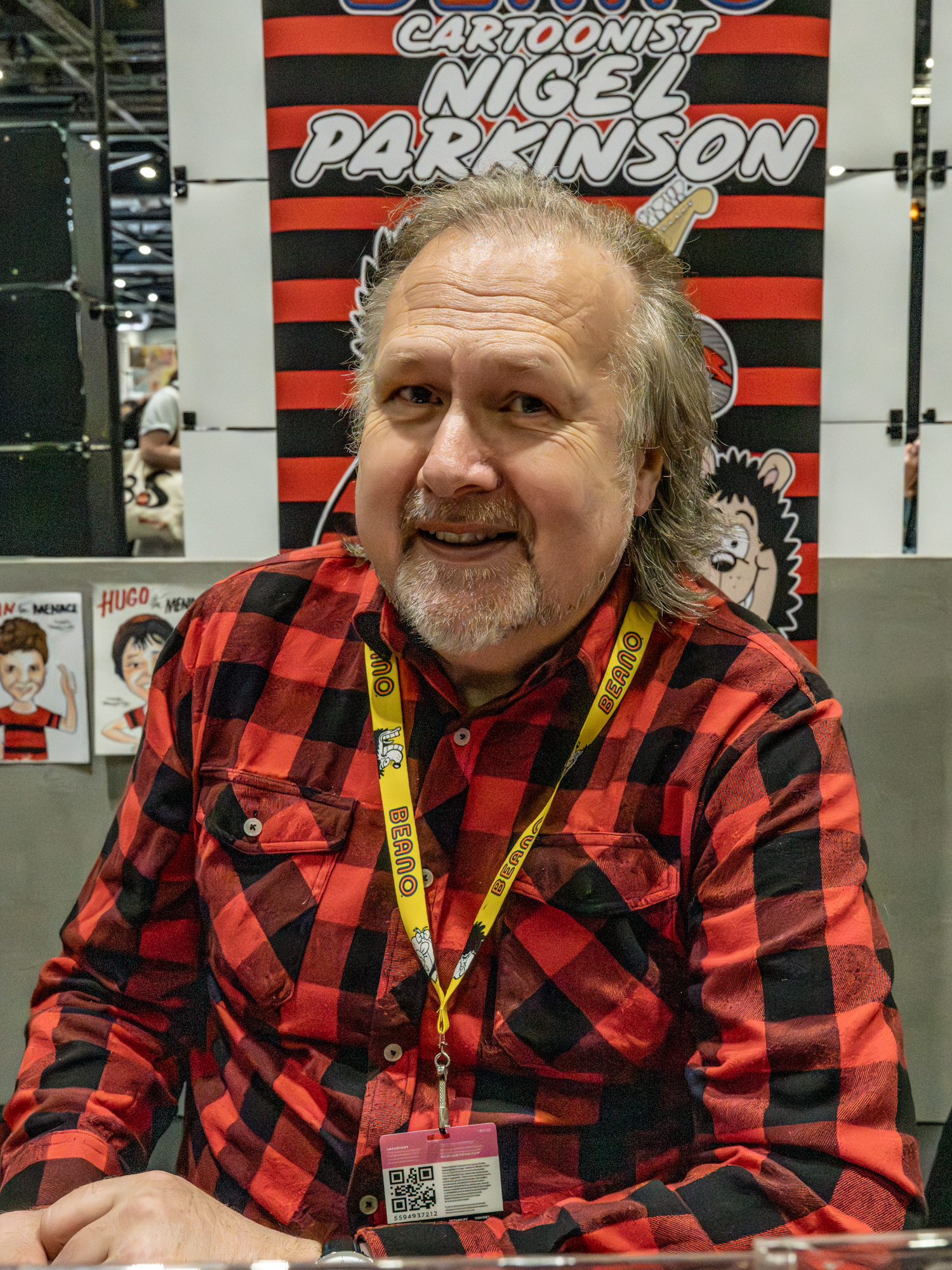
At the MCM Comic Con London, May 2025

Nigel Parkinson is a British cartoonist who was born in Liverpool in 1959 and mainly works for D. C. Thomson & Co. Ltd and draws The Beano and The Dandy.

== Biography ==
Parkinson is the official artist for Dennis the Menace in The Beano. His career in comics began in 1980. Over the following twenty years he worked for many British publishers including for example Fleetway drawing Thunderbirds, Stingray, Scouse Mouse and others, BBC Magazines drawing strips based on TV shows like Grange Hill, Baywatch, and as a 'ghost' artist for many titles published by D.C. Thomson. His first work for The Dandy was in 1982; his first work for The Beano was in 1996. He started drawing Bea in October 1998. Parkinson also occasionally draws The Bash Street Kids, and was particularly active on that strip between 1999 and 2001. He also ghosted Mike Pearse's style for the spin-off strip Singled Out in BeanoMAX.

In 1998, Parkinson started work on The Dandy's then-new football-mad character, Owen Goal, redefining the strip and drawing it until Dandy Xtreme in 2007.

In 1999 Parkinson commenced drawing Dennis the Menace initially alternating his interpretation of the character with artist David Parkins, until 2003. From 2003 onwards he intermittently drew Dennis the Menace varying frequently with other artists on the Beano's front cover artwork. Particularly August 2007 until Mid October 2007 saw Parkinson draw Dennis on the majority of the weekly issue covers. Parkinson continued this trend of occasionally drawing Dennis rotating regularly with other artists, up until issue #3477 April 4th 2009.After the launch of the 2009 animation series later that August Parkinson and other previous artists were replaced by Jim Hansen, Barrie Appleby and Tom Paterson for the tenure of the run of the 'Dennis and Gnasher' animation series. However he did make a brief return to drawing the front cover artwork for issue #3529 10th April 2010. In August 2012 he was commissioned by D.C. Thomson to become the sole official Dennis artist. At the same time he was asked to draw Minnie the Minx in the Beano, which he both drew and wrote, often with Paul Palmer, before handing over the strip to him in 2016.

In 2003, The Dandy asked Parkinson to freshen up the look of the terrible toddlers Cuddles and Dimples, taking over from the original artist, Barrie Appleby and changing the appearance of the characters and the personalities of their parents. His foxy version of Cuddles and Dimples' mum has become a fan favourite.

Since 2005 Nigel Parkinson has also illustrated all of the Beano Jigsaw Puzzles and most of Dennis the Menace merchandise.

In 2008 he began drawing Puss'n'Boots and Marvo the Wonder Chicken for The Dandy and designed a new version of Lord Snooty - Lord Snooty the Third - for The Beano's 70th birthday year.

In 2010 he wrote and drew a comic strip based on comedian Harry Hill's TV Burp for The Dandy (with co-writers including Harry Hill, Sean Baldwin, David Quantick and Duncan Scott) and in 2012 a 12-week run of The Banana Bunch.

In early 2012 he asked fellow Liverpudlian Sir Paul McCartney if he would appear in the final print edition of The Dandy, as he had said in 1963 that his ambition was to have his picture in the comic; McCartney did, and later claimed some of his friends and family thought it was a highlight of his career.

In 2013, a drawing of Mock the Week regulars Dara Ó Briain, Hugh Dennis, Andy Parsons and Chris Addison alongside Dennis was shown (and commented on) on an episode of the series.

He has also drawn adverts for Milky Way, Wenlock & Mandeville, Lego, Nesquik, and Real Construction. He drew the record sleeve for Kaiser Chiefs's single "The Angry Mob" and Count Arthur Strong's Christmas CD.

He drew the stamps collection for both Isle of Man Post office in 2018 and The Royal Mail in 2021

He is one of the few commercial cartoonists in the UK to operate a studio system with assistants. His colour artist since 2005 is Nika Nartova.

From 2015 he began attending Comic cons regularly (having refused all but one offer in 2008, until then) with Nartova where they do sketches for attendees, give interviews and talks and demonstrations. Together and separately they have visited over 60 different British towns and cities including London (18 times), Edinburgh (twice), Cardiff (5 times), Belfast, Manchester (4 times), Glasgow (4 times), Birmingham (4 times), Brighton (twice), Newcastle, Bristol (3 times) York, Kendal, Blackpool (7 times), Exeter (4 times), Reading (three times), Leeds (three times), Cambridge (twice), Liverpool (8 times), Bolton (3 times), Wigan (3 times), Weymouth, Southport, Walsall, Dundee (twice), Loughborough, Bradford, Norwich, Nottingham, Shrewsbury (twice), Nantwich (twice), Buxton (4 times), Blackburn, Bath, Bournemouth, Portsmouth, Enniskillen (4 times), Telford (4 times), Hull (twice), Northwich (twice), Macclesfield (4 times), Carlisle, Harrogate, Warrington, Morecambe (3 times), Derby, Eden Project, Derry, Kenilworth, Barry Island, Gloucester, Oldham, Plymouth, Luton, Ellesmere Port, Cleethorpes, Bury, Chorley, Neston, Carlisle, Llangollen, Harrogate, Truro, Bowness-on-Windemere, Sale and Sunderland as well as Comic Cons in Ireland, Greece and Malta.

== Comic strips ==
The main strips that Nigel has drawn are:

Comic Strip	Dates	Comic drawn for	Notes
The Banana Bunch	2000–2004, 2012	The Dandy/Dandy Xtreme	
The Bash Street Kids	1998–present	The Beano/BeanoMAX	Drawn regularly between 1999 and 2001, and occasionally since then, filling in for David Sutherland
Bash Street Kids - Singled Out	2007–2013	BeanoMAX	
Beaginnings	1998–2008	The Beano	
Cuddles and Dimples	2004–2010, 2012–present	The Dandy, Dandy Xtreme	Took over from Barrie Appleby when The Dandy relaunched in 2004. Axed when Dandy revamped in October 2010. Returned in January 2012, as reprints
Dennis the Menace	1999–present	The Beano, the Beano max, Dennis the menace and Gnasher's epic mag	Drew about half of all Dennis's between 1999 and 2009, became Official Dennis artist from 2012.
Lord Snooty the Third	2008–2011	The Beano	Lord Snooty's grandson
Marvo the Wonder Chicken	2008–2012	Dandy Xtreme, The Dandy	Returned in August 2008. Casualty of 2010 Dandy revamp. Returned again in issue 3515.
Owen Goal	1998–2009. 2014–present	The Dandy, Dandy Xtreme	Replaced reprints of Cannonball Kid
Minnie The Minx	2012–2016	Beano	Became regular Minnie artist
Harry Hill's Real Life Adventures in TV Land Featuring Knitted Character	2010–2012	The Dandy	Dennis the Menace and Gnasher Mag
