= Owen Goal =

British comic strip

Owen Goal was a British comic strip published in the comics magazine The Dandy. It centers around a schoolboy who plays for a school football team. The comic strip is one page long and features Owen's interaction with his overweight, lazy and incompetent coach. The strip is very similar to DC Thomson stablemate The Beano's Ball Boy strip.

It started in the Dandy in 1998 as reprinted versions of Cannonball Kid from Nutty drawn by Rob Lee, recolored, given a new masthead of a football shirt with OWEN GOAL on it, and with new speech balloons.

From December 1998, Owen got new strips drawn by Nigel Parkinson, which played more on Owen's interaction with his coach and his very poor football skills (the title is a pun on the phrase own goal, combined with the name of the English footballer Michael Owen (who at the time was in his late teens when the strip was first printed). Owen continued into the new Dandy, apparently at the same school as Jak, where he would still occasionally appear.

Owen's coach is lazy and, in his spare time, eats much junk food.

It appeared only sporadically during the Xtreme era but appears from time to time in Dandy specials and annuals.
