= The Desperate Dan Book =

Comic books

The Desperate Dan books, featuring the comic book character Desperate Dan, were published in 1954, 1978, 1990, 1991 and 1992. Since they were traditionally released in the autumn and in time for Christmas, all bar the first (which had no date) had the date of the following year on the cover.

Although not a Desperate Dan Annual, a book celebrating his 60th birthday was released in 1997 called The Legend of Desperate Dan (60 years of classic cartoon art). It featured a history of the strip, and reprints of strips from 1937 to 1967.

== Covers ==
- The Dandy's Desperate Dan featured Dan's face in the middle, surrounded by four pictures of him doing things like bending a lamppost.
- The Desperate Dan Book 1979 featured Dan shaving his stubble with a blowtorch and meat cleaver.
- The Desperate Dan Book 1991 (from The Dandy) featured Dan wearing 4 costumes- a cowboy costume, an Indian chief costume, a gambler costume and an outlaw costume. Underneath was an envelope featuring a normally dressed Dan on the stamp, saying "If you want me on a Cactusville stamp, it's got to be the real me!"
- The Desperate Dan Book 1992 featured Dan eating cow pie, surrounded by small aliens. Speaking to the aliens, he was saying "Ain't seen you around Cactusville before-care for a piece of cow-pie?"
- The Desperate Dan Book 1993 featured 4 pictures of Dan posing on a bearskin. The first was from when he was 6 months old, the second from when he was 2 years old, the third from when he was 4 1/2 years old, and the fourth from today. In the fourth picture, the bearskin is saying "You're a mite heavy for posin' on me now, Dan!"
- The Legend of Desperate Dan (60 years of classic cartoon art) featured Dan looking into a mirror while shaving his stubble with a blowtorch.

== See also ==
List of DC Thomson publications
