= The Smasher =

Comic strip character

The Smasher (later shortened to just Smasher) was a British comic strip, published in the British comic The Dandy. The title character was a boy with a tendency to destroy things and who was reminiscent of Dennis The Menace from The Beano, though when he destroyed things it usually tended to be by accident rather than design. Initially Smasher had a bright red hairstyle that was similar to that of Dennis, though it soon changed to being black. He wore a similar sort of jumper to Roger the Dodger, albeit it is a diamond pattern rather than chequered pattern.

The strip was first drawn by Hugh Morren in 1958, who drew it until 1984, when Dave Gudgeon took over. He drew the strip until 1986, after which the strip was handed over to Brian Walker, around the time "The" was dropped from the title. Walker made some changes to the character, giving Smasher a more teenaged look, a slightly longer hairstyle and a jacket in place of his jumper; his attitude was also toned down somewhat (The character was rewritten to be a more accident-prone figure), as the editor felt, that he had become too openly malicious by that time. Walker carried on drawing the strip for most of the next two decades; its appearances became more sporadic in the late 1990s, however, and the strip was finally dropped completely with the comic's relaunch in 2004.

However, some of the strips were reprinted in the Comix section of Dandy Xtreme in 2007. He reappeared in the Dandy Annual 2013 drawn by Postman Prat artist Lew Stringer.
