= The Crunch (comics) =

British comic magazine

The Crunch was an A4 British comic that ran from (issue dates) 20 January 1979 to 26 January 1980 after which it merged with The Hotspur. Its strips included:

== Comic strips published in "The Crunch" ==
- The Kyser Experiment
- Clancy and the Man
- Arena
- The Mantracker
- Hitler Lives
- The Walking Bombs
- Who Killed Cassidy?
- Crag
- Starhawk
- Kill the Hit Man
- The Mill Street Mob
- Space Wars
- Ebony

The Crunch had 32 pages and ran for 54 issues.

== See also ==
- List of DC Thomson publications
