= The Numskulls =

British comic strip series

- DC Thomson comic strip character(s)

Publication information
- Creator(s): Malcolm Judge
- Other contributors: Tom Lavery; John Dallas; Steve Bright; Tom Paterson; Trevor Metcalfe; Jim Petrie; Barry Glennard; Dave Eastbury
- Current/last artist: Nigel Auchterlounie

First appearance
- The Beano: Issue #2674 (16 October 1993)
- The Dandy: 2013
- The Beezer: 1962
- Beezer/Topper: 1990

Last appearance
- The Dandy: 2013
- The Beezer: 1990

Characters
- Regular characters: Edd, Brainy, Radar, Snitch, Blinky, Cruncher, Mr. Throbb
- Other characters: Mum

The Numskulls is a comic strip in The Beano, and previously in The Beezer and The Dandy – UK comics owned by D.C Thomson. The strip is about a team of tiny human-like technicians who live inside the heads of various people, running and maintaining their bodies and minds. It first appeared in The Beezer from 1962 until 1979, drawn by Malcolm Judge. The Numskulls are still going and featured weekly in the popular British comic The Beano.

== History ==
The strip first appeared in The Beezer in 1962 and was drawn by Malcolm Judge. In this version, they lived inside a man's head rather than a boy's head. The man was never named, but the Numskulls referred to him as "our Man". There were six Numskulls during this time. The 'Mouth Department' was home to two Numskulls, named Alf and Fred. Luggy (Radar) looked a lot like Cruncher, Snitch looked like Cruncher as well except Snitch wore orange, Brainy had no glasses and had no hair apart from around his ears and wore black, Blinky looked the same except he was bald and Alf and Fred had two hairs on their head and wore black and yellow.

Judge drew the strip until 1979, at which point Tom Lavery started drawing the strip. Judge returned as artist in 1984, and continued to draw it until his death in 1989. Following his death, John Dallas took over as artist. In 1990 the comic became The Beezer and Topper following the merge of The Topper and The Beezer. It was at this point that the man was replaced by a boy. In the Beezer and Topper, Dallas continued drawing the strip for a few months, before Steve Bright took over as artist for most of the comic's remaining run. Three years later the comic folded, and the strip joined The Beano in issue 2674, dated 16 October 1993, drawn by Tom Paterson. It was at this point "Our Boy" became Edd, and each numskull was given a new look. The strip in the 60th anniversary special was drawn by Trevor Metcalfe. Paterson continued drawing it until late 2000, as shortly afterwards he took over Minnie the Minx from the retired Jim Petrie. The strip was then drawn by Barry Glennard, who became the permanent artist in 2003, although Dave Eastbury drew some strips on occasion during 2002. Tom Paterson returned to contribute a number of strips in 2007–2009, as well as in the 2009 and 2011 Beano Annuals.

After "Our Man" became "Edd" and "Luggy" became "Radar" and "Nosey" became "Snitch", Edd became aware of the Numskulls' existence inside him, after a doctor discovered them on his X-ray system. Despite the doctor's alarm and decision that they had to be removed, Edd was very calm and wondered whether getting rid of them was a bad idea.

The Numskulls in this version are:

- Brainy – controls Edd's brain. Brainy is the head of the Numskulls.
- Blinky – controls his sight/eyes.
- Radar (originally called Luggy) – controls his hearing/ears.
- Snitch (originally called Nosey) – controls his smell/nose.
- Cruncher (originally two characters called Alf & Fred) – controls his mouth/taste.

Occasionally other numskulls are seen who control Edd's other body functions including germ fighting numskulls, numskulls in the stomach, pelvis numskulls and blood numskulls.

Some earlier strips had suggested that everyone had Numskulls. A Bananaman summer special, for instance featured an X-ray of Bananaman showing the "Nanaskulls". Even animals and other Beano stars were revealed to have Numskulls, in fact, the centre story of the 2008 Annual was centred around Plug's Plugskulls, reacting to true love. A rare trope in their strips would occur when the Numskulls of animals (such as dogs, rabbits and pigeons) would invade Edd, causing him to behave in the same characteristics as their animal hosts.

In December 2012, a new version of The Numskulls appeared in the new digital version of The Dandy. This version was about a younger boy called Alex Bonce, whose Numskulls are not stick figures but instead are concepts popular with children – the brain is controlled by a space jackal starship captain, the nose by a masked wrestler, the eyes by a video game elf (a spoof of Link from The Legend of Zelda), the ears by a robot, and the mouth by a barbarian and a dinosaur. It was drawn by Jamie Smart for all 13 issues of the digital Dandy before its abrupt cancellation in 2013.

In July 2013, the Beano version was revamped by Nigel Auchterlounie as part of the Beano's 75th anniversary celebrations. This revamped version of the comic did not feature Edd and instead depicted the Numskulls of various celebrities, including Simon Cowell, Will.i.am, and Ant and Dec amongst others. The Numskulls had different designs each week to match their given celebrity, but were still referred to as Brainy, Blinky, Radar, Snitch and Cruncher. This version of the comic would last for the rest of the year until Edd returned in 2014, although Auchterlounie stayed on as artist and still draws the comic as of 2026.

The comic received media attention in 2015 following the release of Pixar's Inside Out due to perceived similarities between the concepts, which the strip eventually parodied in a Numskulls-centric issue of The Beano. Beano editor Mike Stirling clarified that the strip was not intending to accuse Pixar of plagiarism, but said he liked to think the Numskulls had "subliminally influenced" Inside Out, whereas Inside Out co-director Ronnie del Carmen said he had not been familiar with the Numskulls at the time of writing.

== Parodies ==
The strip was parodied in the Viz comic strip "Driving Mr Beckham", in which we are privy to the thought processes of David Beckham, in a style akin to the Numskulls.

== See also ==
- Chinese room
- Homunculus
- Herman's Head
- The Beezer
- Meet Dave
- Inside Out
