= Dundee Public Art Programme =

The Dundee Public Art Programme was the first city-wide public art initiative in Scotland. It grew out of the success of the Blackness Public Art Programme (1982-1985) which focused on the use of art to revitalise an area of industrial decline in the city of Dundee, Scotland.

== Origins ==
The Blackness Public Art Programme was a three-year initiative jointly funded by the Scottish Development Agency, the Scottish Arts Council and Dundee District Council. Dundee District Council extended the project to other parts of the city. The co-ordinator for the programme, artist Robert McGilvray, was asked to produce a feasibility report which suggested various locations that would benefit and set out key aims. This led in 1985 to the establishment of the Dundee Public Art Programme (DPAP).

== Early projects ==
The DPAP received annual project funding from the Scottish Arts Council but its success was dependent on support from a broader initiative, the Dundee Project, initiated in 1982, which took a partnership approach to issues of economic development and physical improvement of the city. It was superseded by the current Dundee Partnership in 1991.

The DPAP received most of its early commissions from the Dundee Project partners, with the Scottish Development Agency providing much of the funding. Artworks were therefore sited in areas already targeted for wider environmental and economic development. Early projects included Dunsinane industrial estates (artworks by Chris Kelly and Mike Windle), the new Dundee Technology Park (artwork by David Annand) and Whitfield housing estate (artwork by Chris Biddlecombe, Chris Kelly and Martha Macdonald).

== City centre developments ==
Early projects in or near the city centre included a fence design by Rod Chisholm outside the refurbished railway station (1987), the Wave Wall by David F Wilson by Meadowside St Paul’s Church (1988–89) and sculptural plaques for the fountains in City Square by Lizanne Kempsell (1988). In 1992, bespoke street furniture was commissioned: David F Wilson designed a bollard at the top of Couttie’s Wynd, which led to a whole range of bollards, railings, benches, tree guards, flower baskets and information boards appearing around the city centre the next few years.

As the first part of the city centre to be pedestrianised, Murraygate was the initial focus of the DPAP’s central area programme. As well as Wilson’s street furniture they commissioned ground mosaics from Elizabeth McFall, Chris Biddlecombe and Chris Kelly and a sculpture of a dragon from Alastair Smart (completed after Smart’s death by Tony Morrow).

Less successful were attempts to create a landmark sculptural piece for the centre of the High Street between City Square and Reform Street. Various proposals were considered during the 1990s including by David Mach, Doug Cocker, Jake Harvey and William Pye, but no agreement could be reached by funding partners and eventually the project was dropped. It would not be until 2001 that a major piece of sculpture was unveiled near this site: Tony and Susie Morrow’s statues of Desperate Dan and Minnie the Minx.

== National acclaim ==
In 1987 Luke Rittner, the secretary-general of the Arts Council of Great Britain, visited the city and described the public art programme as “an example for the rest of Britain to follow”. Later that year the Upper Dens Urban Renewal Project won the Royal Town Planning Institute’s prestigious Silver Jubilee Award, public art again being noted as an important component. In 1992 and 1994 the DPAP was shortlisted for the Arts Council / British Gas Working for Cities award and in 1998 Dundee won a national award for the best shopping environment in the UK from the British Council of Shopping Centres, the contribution of public art being singled out as a major factor. An influential national report by the Public Art Forum described Dundee as having “one of the highest profiles in the UK” for public art.

The Dundee model was widely imitated across the country, and an important source of income for the programme came from the many feasibility studies they were asked to undertake for other public art initiatives – for example in Inverness, Nairn, Ullapool, Coatbridge and Inverclyde. The DPAP helped to establish the Perthshire Public Art Trust and also took on commissions for the development of major one-off sculptural pieces around Scotland.

== Later projects ==
The late 1990s saw the DPAP unveiling landmark sculptures, mosaics, stained glass and other artworks across the city, including:

- On the Wing by Diane Maclean near Dundee Airport (1995)
- Ring o’ Roses by J Keith Donnelly on King Street (1996)
- Bespoke gates by P Johnson & Co around the city centre (1996-2006)
- Mosaics and stained glass by Sara Daly and Liz Rowley at Dundee Bus Station (1998)
- The Overgate Bronzes by David F Wilson (2000)

The Dundee Public Art Programme ceased trading in 2003 due to a lack of funding to support the organisation as a full time concern for which it had been operating since 1998. Inspired by the arrival of Dundee Contemporary Arts, the company grew in that period to deliver a wider range of activity including moving into DCA's Visual Research Centre to run its office and a small gallery to showcase proposals from local and nationally acclaimed artists such as Simon Patterson and Adrian Wizniewski. The DPAP gallery was also used by Scottish Enterprise Tayside to engage the public in early plans for the Waterfront. In this time DPAP worked on developments with The Rep, The Space and Dundee Science Centre and attracted commissions from further afield in Glasgow, Caithness and Tyneside (such as Dudes by Permindar Kaur for the North Sea Ferry Terminal). It also delivered events for Scottish Natural Heritage and the Year of the Artist in 2000 but this growth was not sustainable long term particularly given the low level of core support that the organisation received and which had not increased in that period. It was also understood that The Scottish Arts Council were to make significant changes that year to the core funding that it had been providing to all public art agencies in Scotland. SAC would look to identify new ways of funding public art and commissioned The Roberts Knight Leeds Metropolitan University Consultancy (RKL) to provide recommendations by evaluating National Lottery schemes which had been supporting the work of artists in the public realm. This period saw a number of reports commissioned by funding bodies in an attempt to understand how best to take forward this field of practice and which are documented on the Public Art On Line website.

In 2002 Dundee City Council adopted a Percent for Art Scheme, which has allowed major public art projects to continue in the city. In 2014, Dundee was awarded UNESCO City of Design status, its wealth of public art being an important factor.
