= Thomas Williams (cartoonist) =

- Born: 17 October 1940 Stockton-on-Tees, England, UK
- Died: 8 May 2002 (aged 61) UK
- Area: Artist
- Notable works: Creature Teacher; Peter Pest; Stevie Starr

Thomas Watson Williams (17 October 1940 – 8 May 2002) was an English cartoonist.

Born in Stockton-on-Tees, Tom Williams attended art college in Newcastle in the early 1960s. He became an animator for leading British animation studio Halas and Batchelor shortly after leaving college.

In the early 1970s he left the world of cartoon animation and began illustrating in the hugely popular British comics published by Fleetway Publications.

Amongst the titles he illustrated were Shiver and Shake, Whizzer and Chips, Cor!! and Monster Fun, where he drew one of his most celebrated characters, Creature Teacher.

Towards the end of the 1970s, Williams moved to IPC rivals DC Thomson, where he worked on all the most week-known titles, including The Beano and The Dandy.

A versatile cartoonist, he was able to copy the styles of many of the regular artists, and produce strips for publications like the Beano Annual and the fledgling mini-comic books that were emerging at the time.

He was heavily involved in the launch of Nutty, where he drew the Peter Pest and Stevie Starr strips.

In a long and varied career, he also produced cartoon strips for the British Girl Guide magazine, many of the UK local and tabloid newspapers, and football programmes. He was also often commissioned to produce cartoons for advertising purposes.
