= Jak and Todd =

Fictional characters

Jak Hurley and Todd Nolan
- First appearance: 1997
- Created by: Wayne Thompson
- Portrayed by: Wayne Thompson

In-universe information
- Aliases: Jak & Todd

Jak Hurley and Todd Nolan are two fictional comic strip characters from the UK comic The Dandy who rose to popularity as the comic's main strip after its re-launch in 2004. Originally known as simply Jak, both characters received equal billing after the popularity of Todd from readership.

== Character history ==
=== Early strips (1997–2004) ===
Jak's first incarnation was drawn by Jimmy Hansen starting from issue 2924, dated 6 December 1997. The strip played mostly on his relationship with his father (though not to the same extent as Molly and Beryl the Peril from that time). The second incarnation in the early 2000s (decade) was drawn by David Sutherland, who drew Jak's dad with black hair and a beard, and introduced a cat called Spike. Both strips portrayed Jak as younger than his modern-day counterpart and Todd was absent.

=== Dandy re-launches (2004–2010) ===
Finally, Jak was reincarnated with the Dandy from issue 3282, dated 16 October 2004, coinciding with the relaunch of the comic that same week. This time it was drawn by Wayne Thompson, and the cast had changed again, introducing Jak's friend Todd and sister Mandy—and Jak got the surname Hurley. Unusually, this time Jak was promoted as a brand new character, even though he had only disappeared from the comic earlier that year. Brought in through an attempt to boost the comic to modern-day youth, he replaced Desperate Dan on the cover. He continued to be the cover star for two years until 2007 marked the second radical Dandy launch in a decade.

With the launch of Dandy Xtreme in August 2007, the strip was renamed Jak and Todd, giving Jak best friend equal billing. However, the comic's front cover no longer featured its original characters, favouring advertisements for new movies instead.

=== Absence from the comic (2010–present) ===
As the Dandy went through yet another re-launch (this time dropping the X-Treme tagline) Jak and Todd were dropped. However, they have made brief cameos such as members of The Dandy football team and as posters on the editors walls. They have also appeared both the 2011 and 2012 annuals.

== Physical appearance ==
Jak sports styled spiked blonde hair, a purple hooded T-shirt and baggy jeans. He is often illustrated with button eyes but this is occasionally changed depending on his emotions (e.g. if he is shocked they may bulge out). Todd is a black boy with a red T-shirt, baggy jeans and a comb neatly placed into his afro, however this has been removed in recent incarnations. Both the boys' appearances attempt to represent youth of the 2000s, which was not often in many of DC Thomson's publications as they often favoured past characters whose appearance did not necessarily age but did not exactly represent a particular time zone either.

== Personality traits ==
Both Jak and Todd are troublemaking individuals with a hatred for girls, education and authority. Whilst many other Dandy and Beano characters cause mischief for fun or by accident, Jak and Todd appear to do so in an act of rebellion. Both boys also have the tendency to say phrases such as 'Dude' and 'Busted' and have a love for pizza. Whilst friends, neither are afraid of making fun of the other should they see any sort of fear, acts of retribution or guilt. They are also known to have inside bets with one another about how stupid or gullible older characters can be. They both, also, execute almost outlandish plans to get what they want. This includes faking news reports, breaking into school and dressing up as teachers. Despite this, both seem to be extremely intelligent in the ways of tricking as they are always able to get back on bullies or Jak's sister when they try to make their lives miserable.

In The Dandy Annual 2009, there was a strip, which featured Ollie Fliptrik going round The Dandy Movie Set. When he visited Jak's caravan, he told the readers that "He's not exactly like he seems in his stories...", as it was backstage, making Jak seem as though he was an actor. Before Ollie had said this, a conversation had been held between the two:
Ollie: Hey, Jak. What's up?
Jak: I finally got the 1974 Moldovian Three Gringo Stamp – unlicked! How awesome is that?
This may also have something to do with the ongoing rivalry between the pair, trying to be cooler than one another.

=== Relationships with other characters ===
Mandy is Jak's older sister and the nemesis of both the boys. She is arrogant and obsessive over what's in or out much to the opposite of Jak. She is regularly the subject of the two's tricks and often attempts to get back at them. However, this usually only ends in her being tricked once again. In a feature-length story for The Dandy All-Stars mini-magazine, she was hypnotized by Jak and then forced to do embarrassing things in front of her friends such as act like a baby and style her hair into a perm. The story ended with Jak's parents catching him and threatening that if he didn't snap his sister out of her trance they would ground him. Ironically, however, Jak then hypnotized them both to bring him presents, gifts and take back their punishment. The next week, all characters had returned to normal so it is assumed that he had snapped them out of it. Mandy also hates dogs, especially Todd's large dog Toby. In one strip, she even called the Dog Pound and had him imprisoned but this didn't last long as he broke out with ease sue to his bulk and the promise of a sausage stick. Despite her misgivings with her brother, she has occasionally shown sisterly love towards him. Todd does have a small crush on Mandy, but Jak never pays enough attention to hear about this. For examples in an issue of The Dandy Xtreme in 2010, Jak says "There's Mandy at her hockey club. Should we soak her?". Todd replies (seemingly in a low tone) "No, I think we should just admire her from here.". Jak says "Good idea! Let's soak her from here!".

Bruce and Jayne Hurley are Jak's parents whom he has a fairly decent relationship with despite his troublemaking. During his younger years, Jak's father had been a part of a band and apparently disliked Jayne to such a degree that he had drawn a crude picture of her entitling her to have zits. Bruce can be considered rather dense as well as he often falls for his son's lies and excuses but Jayne often does not and is the more firm-hand parent.

Mr Brisket is the headmaster at Dandytown school. He is strict, violent and exceptionally gullible as Jak had once actually convinced him to buy his own desk and nameplate back with him citing the coincidence that there were 'two Robert Briskets in the area'.

Miss Rankin is their teacher. She is equally as strict and harsh but Jak and Todd often exact revenge on her via pranks. She has a crush on Mr Brisket.
