= Desperate Dan =

British comics character

- Comic strip character(s) from The Dandy

Publication information
- Stars in: Desperate Dan
- Creator(s): Dudley D. Watkins
- Other contributors: Peter Davidson; Ken H. Harrison; Tom Williams; David Parkins; Trevor Metcalfe; Anthony Caluori; John Geering; Steve Bright; Jamie Smart
- Current/last artist: David Parkins
- First appearance: Issue 1 (4 December 1937)
- Last appearance: Final issue in 2013
- Also appeared in: The Dandy Annual
- Current status: Was ongoing in the comic until the comic's online demise
- Schedule: Weekly
- Spin-offs: Desperate Dawg; Danny and Katey (c.1970 – c.1989); Aunt Aggie

Main Character
- Name: Dan
- Alias(es): Desperate Dan
- Family: Aunt Aggie; Danny (nephew); Katey (niece)

Characters
- Regular characters: Aunt Aggie, Dawg, Little Bear, Danny, Katey, Sheriff, The Mayor, Zeke, Hoss, Dangerous Dan
- Crossover characters: A famous cameo from The Beano's Dennis the Menace

Desperate Dan is a wild west character in the now-defunct Scottish comic magazine The Dandy. He made his appearance in the first issue which was dated 4 December 1937 and became the magazine's mascot. He is apparently the world's strongest man, able to lift a cow with one hand. The pillow of his (reinforced) bed is filled with building rubble and his beard is so tough he shaves with a blowtorch.

The character was created by Dudley D. Watkins, originally as an outlaw or ‘desperado’ (hence his name), but evolved into a more sympathetic type, using his strength to help the underdog. After Watkins’ death in 1969, the cartoons were drawn by many other artists, principally Ken H. Harrison, though the Watkins canon was often recycled. When the Dandy became digital-only in 2012, the Desperate Dan strips were drawn by David Parkins.

There is a statue of Dan in Dundee, Scotland, where his publishers, D. C. Thomson & Co. are based.

== History ==
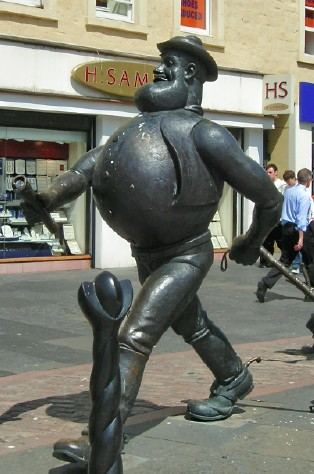
The statue of Desperate Dan in Dundee City Centre

The strip was drawn by Dudley D. Watkins until his death in 1969. Although The Dandy Annuals featured new strips from other artists from then on, the comic continued reprinting Watkins strips until 1983 (though the then Korky the Cat artist Charles Grigg drew new strips for annuals and summer specials), when it was decided to start running new strips. These were initially drawn by Peter Davidson, but Ken H. Harrison soon took over as regular artist. The following year Dan was promoted to the front cover of The Dandy, replacing Korky who had been there since issue 1. In 1993–1994, Ladybird Books published two Desperate Dan books, Desperate Dan and the Cactusman and Desperate Dan: Diamond Disaster, which were also released on cassette, read by Tony Robinson. Starting from issue 2985, dated 6 February 1999, Cuddles and Dimples replaced Dan on the front cover. This did not last long, however, as after a readers' poll in 2000, Dan returned to the cover. Although Ken Harrison was the main artist from 1983 to 2007, other artists have also occasionally filled in for Harrison, including Tom Williams, David Parkins, Trevor Metcalfe and Anthony Caluori in the early 1990s. John Geering took over the strip between 1994 and 1997, after which Harrison returned as full-time artist (though Steve Bright occasionally acted as a ghost artist as well). When The Dandy was redesigned and renamed Dandy Xtreme, the writers used reprints of the old comic strips, until Jamie Smart took over drawing and writing the Desperate Dan comic strips in April 2008. In May 2025, a The Dandy Summer Special was published, featuring Smart's Desperate Dan strips.

Desperate Dan's final appearance left his fate ambiguous after being caught in an oil well explosion.

== Characteristics ==
Desperate Dan's favourite food is cow pie – a type of enormous meat pie with the horns sticking out, although the term "cow pie" has a different meaning in the American West. Much like Popeye with his spinach, Desperate Dan draws his immense power from eating these pies. Desperate Dan was voted the UK's second favourite superhero after Batman in 2011.

Initially Dan was a desperado on the wrong side of the law, hence the name Desperate Dan. Later on, however, he switched sides and become a friendlier character, helping the underdog, although sometimes his great strength caused more harm than good. The first member of his family to appear in the strip was Aunt Aggie (issue 107, dated 16 December 1939) followed by his nephew, Danny (issue 304, dated 27 October 1945) and niece, Katey in 1957. In 2001, Desperate Dan's girlfriend Little Bear, an Indian squaw, was introduced, but she disappeared with the 2004 Dandy relaunch, when Dan's artwork style changed.

== Modernisation ==
With the first revamp of The Dandy (from issue 3282, 16 October 2004) Dan, though still drawn by Ken Harrison, was redesigned slightly. His eyes and chin became much bigger and exaggerated. Dan's personality was changed to that of a bumbling fool, a change to which many fans objected. He was originally going to be left out of the revamped issues, but focus group tests objected to his absence.

But, as of the "re-revamp" in August 2007, the strips became classic reprints on the back cover of Dandy Comix in The Dandy Xtreme. While the first few issues ran them in the original monochrome, they have since been run in coloured form. All reprints were adopted from the 1997 Legend of Desperate Dan book which was released to celebrate his 60th anniversary. For the "MegaComix Special" in February 2008, there were two Desperate Dan strips. One was the usual Dudley Watkins reprint, the other was a brand new one by Jamie Smart, who later became Dan's artist and writer for 12 issues in April 2008. The MegaComix Special also featured a guide to drawing by Smart, which showed how he drew the Desperate Dan strip (which was over the page). This didn't actually feature, nor did the comic strip, inside the Comix pullout.

Later, in early April 2008, Smart took over writing and illustrating the Desperate Dan comic strips, and changed Dan's personality into a big hearted dope who was constantly getting into trouble because of his fantastic strength. Zeke's personality was also changed into a person who loved 're-refried beans'. Danny and Katey also disappeared.

A number of spin-off strips have appeared in The Dandy over the years, including Desperate Dawg in the 1970s and 80s, Danny and Katey in the late 1980s and Aunt Aggie in the 2000s (before the 2004 relaunch). A statue of him (and his dog Dawg) can be found in the High Street of Dundee, Scotland, where The Dandy publisher D. C. Thomson & Co. is based. According to the writer Norman Watson, the Desperate Dan statue (erected as part of the Dundee Public Art Programme) is the most photographed of 120 pieces of public art in the city.

== Digital Dandy ==
After the print Dandy ended with its 75th anniversary issue (for which Ken H. Harrison returned to draw one final strip, reverting to the art style he had employed during the 1980s and 1990s), The Dandy relaunched as a digital comic. David Parkins returned to DC Thomson to draw Desperate Dan with Dan's previous artist, Jamie Smart, drawing a relaunch of The Numskulls from The Beezer.

== See also ==
- Desperate Dan Annual

== Notes ==
As with many well-known characters, the name and image of Desperate Dan have been borrowed in many contexts. A limited selection is mentioned here.

1. A 1972 single "Desperate Dan" by Lieutenant Pigeon reached number 17 in the UK Singles Chart.
2. A well-known winning racehorse.
3. An episode of the BBC Television sitcom, Happiness.
4. A reference in Ray Davies' song "Village Green Preservation Society" on the 1968 Kinks album, The Kinks Are the Village Green Preservation Society.
5. The Bonzo Dog Band song "Joke Shop Man" from the album, Keynsham.
