= The Weekly News =

Defunct British national newspaper

- The front page of the specially extended final edition
- Type: Weekly newspaper
- Owner: DC Thomson
- Editor: Billy Higgins
- Founded: 1855
- Ceased publication: 30 May 2020
- Language: English
- Headquarters: Dundee, Scotland

The Weekly News was a British national newspaper founded in 1855 and published every Wednesday by the Dundee newspaper chain DC Thomson. Billed as "the paper with the feelgood factor," it contained news and features on a broad range of subjects in six colour-coded sections: That's Real Life, Entertainment, Lifestyle, Puzzles, Short Stories and Sport.

The first Weekly News came out on 12 May 1855, and was a national miscellany news-sheet, primarily for working people or "artisans". It owes its origins, however, to an offshoot of the Dundee-based Northern Warder newspaper just over a year earlier. During the Crimean War, which resulted in the defeat of Russia by British, French and Turkish troops, a Saturday issue of The Warder began to be issued in April 1854 to carry war news. This edition ultimately gave rise to The Weekly News the following year.

Credit for the paper's birth is due to Robert Park who, four years later in 1859, would bring out Dundee's first daily newspaper, The Daily Argus. However, in 1855, Park saw an opening for a paper to serve the working classes on a Saturday. This induced him to publish a Saturday morning version of The Warder, which eventually became The Weekly News, and was the first weekly penny paper in Scotland. It originally had 10 or 12 pages and was roughly the size of today's compact, or tabloid-format, papers.

When W & DC Thomson was formed in 1886, The Weekly News was one of two papers – along with The Dundee Courier – which passed to the Thomsons' ownership from the Alexander family.

The circulation of the paper rose under the guidance of brothers David Couper and Frederick Thomson, from 60,000 in 1886 to 300,000 twenty-five years later.

As its circulation grew, The Weekly News was advertised as the biggest-selling paper in Scotland and also the biggest-selling paper outside London. Eventually, it sold to all parts of the British Isles in thirteen editions.

The paper eventually reached sales of 1.4 million at its peak in the 1970s. It was one of seven titles in DC Thomson history to sell over a million, and fourth in the list behind The Dandy, The Beano and The Sunday Post.

It was announced in April 2020 that the paper would close. The final edition, number 8,600, was published on 30 May 2020, which coincided with the paper's 165th anniversary.
