= Strange Hill =

Strange Hill, alternatively known as Strange Hill School or Strange Hill School for Ghouls in The Dandy, is the title of two British comic strips, one of which ran in Whizzer and Chips, the other in The Dandy. The title is a reference to the long running BBC TV show Grange Hill about a school of that name. Both strips were set in horrifying schools.

== "Strange Hill" in "The Dandy" ==
The Dandy version was a very "safe" version of Hammer Horror clichés, similar to Number 13 in The Beano or the US TV series The Munsters. Drawn by David Mostyn. The focus was on the school's only normal pupil, who was remarkably unfazed that his schoolmates included a vampire, a mummy, etc. The full title was Eddie Potter at Strange Hill School. (This is not a parody of Harry Potter, who did not exist yet.) It appeared in Dandy, from 1986 to circa 2004. He reappeared for a few issues in 2008, as reprints. He also appeared in the 2012 annual.

== "Strange Hill" in "Whizzer and Chips" ==
By contrast, the Whizzer and Chips version featured a normal teacher, at a similar, but much more grotesque school. Unlike the lead character in the DC Thomson strip, "Teach" found his sanity rapidly decaying as he faced his horrific pupils.

It could be argued that the difference between these strips highlights the differences between the relatively safe, conservative humour of DC Thomson and the more edgy, bizarre Fleetway style.
