= Bully Beef and Chips =

Comic strip from The Dandy

- Comic strip character(s) from The Dandy

Publication information
- Creator(s): Jimmy Hughes
- Other contributors: Gordon Bell; Sid Burgon
- First appearance: Issue (1967)
- Also appeared in: The Dandy Annual; The Beano Annual; Dandy Xtreme; The Beano

Characters
- Regular characters: Bully Beef, Chips

Bully Beef and Chips was a British comic strip, created by Jimmy Hughes. It first appeared in 1967 in the British comics magazine The Dandy. In 2007, a set of Dandy comics, scripts and storyboards created by Hughes, including material from Bully Beef and Chips, was sold at auction for £180,000 (US$360,000).

== Concept ==
The strip told the story of two warring boys – a tall, ugly thug called Bully Beef and a softer, more cunning boy called Chips. The name "Bully Beef and Chips" comes from a quickly-prepared meal – corned beef and chips – with "Bully beef" being a phrase used for corned beef.

Stories of these two were identically themed – Bully Beef (Beefy) would constantly play violent tricks on Chips, who would then get his climactic revenge in some way right at the end. Originally, Bully Beef's eyes were always covered by his hair, but towards the end of the 1980s they became partly visible, and then entirely visible when original artist Jimmy Hughes retired in 1993 and was replaced by Gordon Bell and later Sid Burgon. Burgon changed the characters' personalities a little, and made Chips just as much of a bully as Beefy at times, occasionally resulting in Beefy coming out on top.

== Revivals ==
It was revived in 2009 in Dandy Xtreme, drawn by Wayne Thompson, but this did not last long. After a redesign, it reappeared, again drawn by Thompson, in May 2012. Beefy had made an appearance in both The Beano and The Beano Annual earlier in 2009 – specifically in a reprint Fred's Bed strip from around 1992, where Fred visited both Beanotown and Dandytown, and Beefy was among several characters he met. The annual appearance was in the Reservoir Dodge story, as one of a gang of villains watching Baby Face Finlayson attempt to drown Roger the Dodger, Walter the Softy, Minnie the Minx, Billy Whizz and Calamity James. The strip also appeared in both the 2011 and 2012 Dandy annuals, the 2011 one drawn by an unknown artist whose style resembled Jimmy Hughes's, and in 2012 drawn by Laura Howell.

== Parodies ==
Bully Beef has been parodied in Viz as Biffa Bacon, Cedric Soft being the equivalent of Chips. However, the Viz strip mostly concerns Biffa's interactions with his equally violent (and considerably stronger) parents.
