= Korky the Cat =

- First appearance: The Dandy, Issue 1, 1937.
- Created by: James Crighton
- Species: Bicolor cat
- Family: Nip, Rip and Lip (Nephews)

Korky the Cat is a character in a comic strip in the British comics magazine The Dandy. It first appeared in issue 1, dated 4 December 1937, except for one issue, No. 294 (9 June 1945) when Keyhole Kate was on the cover. For several decades he was the mascot of The Dandy. In 1984, after 47 virtually continuous years, Korky was replaced on the front cover by Desperate Dan.

== History ==
The strip's simple premise follows the adventures of a black male cat called Korky, a cat who behaves like a human and is accepted in a world of humans as only a comic character can be. Originally a mute character, he started speaking in No. 149, 5 October 1940 (see image for his first words as he tries to help some hungry dogs). The 1950s saw the introduction of his 'Kits', Nip, Lip, and Rip.

Artists were:

- James Crighton from issues 1 to 1051 (4 December 1937 to 13 January 1962.
- Charlie Grigg from issues 1052 to 2116 (20 January 1962 to 12 June 1982.
- David Gudgeon from issue 2117 (19 June 1982 to 1986).
- Robert Nixon from 1 November 1986 to 1999
- Phil Corbett from 2010

After 1984, Korky still continued inside the comic, however, and a picture of him remained next to the Dandy logo until 1998. When Robert Nixon took over drawing in the Dandy issue dated 1 November 1986, some changes were made. Korky, whose look had remained virtually the same since the 1940s, now looked noticeably different, particularly in the case of his eyes (though the picture of him next to the Dandy logo was never changed). The focus of the strip also switched more to the Kits, who had been promoted from their originally minor role. So much so, that at one point the strip had been renamed Korky the Cat and the Kits. When Nixon went into semi retirement at the beginning of 1999 (relinquishing Beryl the Peril at the same time) several different artists took up the pen, including David Sutherland (who drew both The Bash Street Kids from The Beano, and Dennis the Menace) at first, Steve Bright, Lesley Reavey, Anthony Caluori, and Dave Windett later on (who introduced a mouse called Squeak and his friends to the cast), and, by 2003, Henry Davies, who was creating hybrid strips from Charles Grigg's classic Korky strips and new elements drawn by Davies.

By 2004, though, the popularity of Korky with readers had significantly dropped. In that year's readers poll, Korky had failed to receive a single vote, either as a favourite character, or a least favourite. With this in mind, it was decided to retire the character after almost 70 years. His apparent last appearance was in issue 3294, dated 8 January 2005, in which, possibly hinting at his unpopularity, he turned up at a school reunion and found that no one knew who he was.

However, on 21 September 2005, it was announced on the Dandy website that Korky was to return in December with a new artist and in new adventures. Korky returned from issue 3338, dated 19 November 2005, this time being drawn by Andrew Painter on computer. The strip was again dropped when the Dandy was re-branded into the magazine-themed Dandy Xtreme. Korky returned again in the Dandy Xtreme Holiday Special, drawn by new Bananaman artist C. McGhie. The Dandy was relaunched on 27 October 2010 with Phil Corbett taking over as the Korky artist. The comic folded in 2012, but D.C. Thompson continues to publish The Dandy Annual, featuring Korky.

== Korky the Twat ==
Adult comic Viz parodied "Korky the Cat" in a strip entitled "Korky the Twat" as part of an ongoing feud with Dandy publishers D.C. Thomson. Viz also parodied other popular D.C. Thomson strips, such as "Desperately Unfunny Dan", "Arsehole Kate", "Roger the Lodger" and "The McBrowntrouts".

== Bibliography ==
- Original comics.
- The Dandy Monster Index 1937-1959 by Ray Moore.
