= The Beano Summer Special =

British comic book

The Beano Summer Special is an edition of The Beano with extra comic strips. This special first started in 1963 with a joint Beano-Dandy summer special and then in 1964 the first Beano summer special appeared. These ran continually until 2003 when they were replaced by Beano specials, which was a series of monthly special Beanos including a Summer Special released in the Summer. In 2006, the Beano specials was discontinued in favour of BeanoMAX. However, in 2011 an ultimate summer special exclusive to WHSmith was released and so was The Beano 3-D Summer Annual 2011. Unlike the traditional Beano of the time, this edition of the comic had a more colourful appearance to it. The front cover of these comics often had one picture which had a caption encouraging the reader to turn to the rear cover to see what happens next. As well as Beano Summer Specials there were also Bash Street Kids Summer Specials.

| Year | Cover Price | Front Cover Contents | Image |
|---|---|---|---|
| 1964 | 1/6 | Biffo the Bear and Buster are on the beach, and the tide's coming in. | |
| 1971 | 10 pence | Dennis the Menace is on the beach with candy floss. Caption reads Dennis won't have that for long! | |
| 1973 | 10 Pence | Biffo the Bear riding a train with Bash Street kids as passengers, whilst Gnasher sleeping on track with Dennis the Menace looking on. | |
| 1974 | 12 Pence | Gnasher racing to catch a green, white and red beach ball. Front Cover says "Is Gnasher going to ruin the game?" Back Cover says "Ha! Ha! Gnasher just wants to join in the fun!" | |
| 1975 | 15 Pence | Bash street kids partaking in a wheel barrow race on the beach. | |
| 1977 | 20 Pence | Dennis the Menace and Gnasher jumping from high board with the Bash Street Kids looking on | |
| 1978 | 22 Pence | Dennis the Menace and Gnasher busking on the beach. | |
| 1980 | 28 Pence | Dennis the Menace and Gnasher in tree attempting to steal food from Bash Street Kids picnic. | |
| 1981 | 32 Pence | Dennis the Menace and Gnasher at swimming pool riding a dolphin water pistoling the Bash Street Kids | |
| 1982 | 32 Pence | Dennis the Menace, Gnasher and the Bash Street Kids taking part in a raft race | |
| 1983 | 40 Pence | Dennis the Menace and Gnasher wind surfing. | |
| 1984 | 43 Pence | Dennis the Menace, Gnasher and the Bash Street Kids on beach taking part in a sack race. | |
| 1985 | 48 Pence | Dennis the Menace, Gnasher pushing Walter the Softy on the swing. | |
| 1988 | 65 Pence | Dennis the Menace, Gnasher bouncing on a Bouncy Castle. This comic offers a chance to "WIN A TRIP TO Alton Towers! SEE INSIDE FOR DETAILS!" at the bottom. | |
| 1989 | 70 Pence | Dennis the Menace, Gnasher riding a donkey over a beach picnic as Bash Street Kids look on horrified. | |
| 1990 | 75 Pence | Dennis the Menace, Gnasher driving a three-wheeler motorized bike around a sand track passing the Bash Street Kids on theirs who look on stunned. | |
| 1992 | 90 Pence | Dennis the Menace, Gnasher and Rasher playing at the playground on a swinging tyre. | |
| 1997 | £1.10 | The Beano characters are on a banana boat. | |
| 1998 | £1.10 | Dennis the Menace and Gnasher on beach while Dennis is roller skating. | |
| 1999 | £1.15 | Dennis the Menace and Gnasher superimposed on a picture of a man wind surfing. | |
| 2001 | £1.25 | Dennis the Menace, Roger the Dodger, Ivy the Terrible, Minnie the Minx, Walter, Smiffy and Wifred flying on a pterodactyl | |
| 2002 | £1.30 | Dennis the Menace throws a frisbee, and Gnasher races to catch it. | |
| 2007 | £1.60 | Dennis the Menace on a Gnasher space hopper while holding a 99 with 2 flakes. | |
