= Black Bob (comics) =

Fictional dog

A typical large single Jack Prout drawing

Black Bob was the name of a fictional Border Collie from Selkirk in the Scottish Borders; his 'owner' was Andrew Glenn, a bearded shepherd. Black Bob originally appeared as a text story in The Dandy on 25 November 1944; in that story, Black Bob follows his owner's nephew who is playing truant and tries to bring him back to school.

The characters were created by John Hunter (1903-1984), originally from Hawick, who worked as a journalist in Dundee, and then came to stay in Selkirk, living in a house in Elm Row, and owning a china and gift shop in Market Place. He wrote the original stories, which were then illustrated by DC Thomson's staff artist, Jack Prout.

As drawn by Jack Prout, further Black Bob stories appeared as a picture strip in The Weekly News in 1946, continuing until 1967, and regularly in The Dandy from his 1944 debut until issue 2122, dated 24 July 1982. Eight Black Bob books were published at infrequent intervals in 1950, 1951, 1953, 1955, 1957, 1959, 1961 and 1965. The books’ stories are in two formats: sizeable bodies of text, dispersed throughout with large illustrations and illustrated panels, each with a paragraph of text below them.

The educational and highly descriptive stories were written for the mid-twentieth-century child, but are sophisticated enough to engage an adult reader. They convey a clear separation of ‘right’ from ‘wrong’, instilling in the young reader, the values of honesty and benevolence.

Bob cannot understand words but can understand ‘tone of voice’ and he is not infallible, occasionally but understandably, acting on wrong information.

Most stories take place in the valley and hills around Selkirk with others set further afield in Britain and some abroad, accentuating the concept of ‘Home’, and it is safely back home where most stories end - often by a cosy fireside.

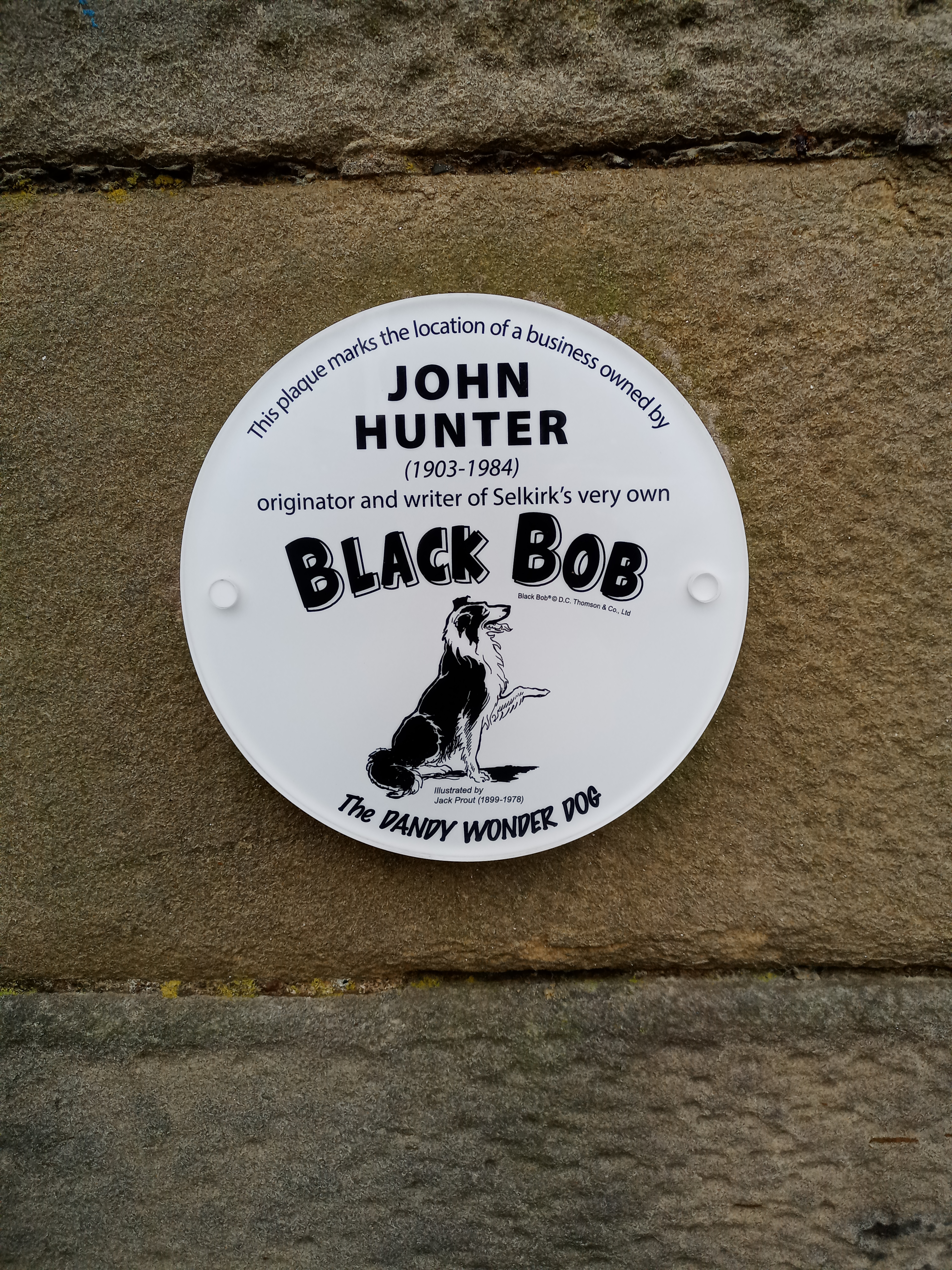
Plaque on the Post Office in Selkirk

A 'The Very Best of Black Bob' was published in 2010, and Bob re-appeared in the 2013 Dandy Annual drawn by Steve Bright in Prout's style.

Jack Prout was born on 14 December 1899 and joined the Scottish publishing firm of D. C. Thomson as a staff artist on 21 June 1937. He retired on 30 June 1968 although his strips were reprinted in the Dandy until 1982. Prout died on 27 September 1978.

Black Bob was parodied in a strip in Viz comic entitled "Black Bag, the Faithful Border Bin Liner".
