= The Jocks and the Geordies =

British comic strip

The Jocks and the Geordies was a British comic strip which appeared in the magazine The Dandy and was drawn by Jimmy Hughes. It ran from 1975 to 1990, when artist Jimmy Hughes retired, with occasional appearances after that date.

== Concept ==
The strip was about two groups of five schoolboys living in the village of Crosspatch, crossing the border of Scotland and England. As a result, they were in constant battles with one another, with each in turn getting their comeuppance for pranks which were often quite violent. Often both sets of boys would be in trouble from their teachers (Mr McAllistair and Mr Bigglesthwaite) at the end, both of whom despaired of the rivalry and would frequently administer the cane (the belt in the case of the Jocks). The Geordies generally got the upper hand as they tended to use cunning, whereas the Jocks relied entirely upon brute force.

The Jocks (Scottish boys) wore various tartan jumpers and tam o'shanter caps, which were so absurdly large that their wearers' eyes were rarely visible. Their names were Big Jock (the leader), Wee Eck, Hector, Angus and Sandy. The Geordies (North East England boys) wore tiny caps and almost identical dark school uniforms; some of their socks were ridiculously tight, making their shins look pencil thin. The names of the Geordies were not always consistent: the fifth Geordie was referred to as 'Sidney' in the 1979 Dandy annual but this name was later given to the leader of the Geordies. The second and fourth Geordies have been referred to as Specky and Lofty respectively, but these names were not used regularly. In the late 1980s, the names of each character appeared under a 'mugshot' and they were Sidney, Percy, Arnold, Cedric and Egbert.
