= Ball Boy (Beano) =

British comic strip character

- Comic strip character(s) from The Beano

Publication information
- Stars in: Ball Boy
- Other contributors: Danny Pearson; Vince Pavey; Alexander Matthews
- Current/last artist: Dave Eastbury; Malcolm Judge; John Dallas; Chris McGee
- First appearance: Issue 1735 (18 October 1975)
- Last appearance: Issue 3733 (10 May 2014)
- Also appeared in: The Beano Annual
- Current status: Limited
- Schedule: Weekly

Main Character
- Name: Ball Boy
- Family: Ball Boy's Mum and Dad

Characters
- Type of group: Sports team (football)
- Members: Titch, Dimmy, Benjy, Goalie
- Regular characters: Coach, Ball Boy's teacher, Wubbish Woy
- Other characters: Chandra Singh
- Crossover characters: Roger the Dodger

Ball Boy is a strip in UK comic The Beano and also the name of the main character.

== Strip History ==
Ball Boy and his comic strip debuted in issue 1,735, dated 18 October 1975 featuring a five-a-side football team who usually lost all their matches. The strip was drawn by Malcolm Judge until his death in 1989. John Dallas took over from him afterwards, and drew it until his retirement in April 2003. The strip was then revamped and taken over by Dave Eastbury. Nigel Parkinson and Tom Paterson both occasionally draw the strip as well. In issue 3,481 (2 May 2009) a John Dallas reprint was used.

For issue 3,260, dated 8 January 2005, the Ball Boy strip was meant to feature a French footballer called Henry Thierry who wore a red shirt. In the strip he is shown a red card and then runs from the team bath when a snorkel appears close to him saying "Time to va-va-voom" – a reference to the Renault adverts in which Thierry Henry appears. The Beano editor Euan Kerr decided to destroy the entire print run of that comic so as not to risk the striker's wrath, the issue eventually going on sale with a different Ball Boy strip in its place.

Ball Boy also features in The BeanoMAX comic, drawn in the black and blue vertical striped kit, by Nigel Parkinson. This was explained in a March 2007 Beano. Ball Boy's Mum accidentally washed the kits with a blue garment, and it dyed the red stripes dark blue. But the team, who'd complained they needed new kits, were happy, so BB didn't admit what had happened. This strip was drawn by regular artist Dave Eastbury. In 2008, Ball Boy's teammates went off on holiday, leaving him needing a new team for a Beanotown Summer League Championship. This team included – Ball Boy, Ronald Osbourne (who has a wealthy mother), Chandra Singh (who is the team's most skilled player), Lily, an unnamed goalkeeper and a kid who has hair hidden over his face. They also now have a proper name – 'Beanotown Juniors'. Ball Boy himself did not score any goals until the final match in this story arc.

From May to August 2009, a number of early 1990s John Dallas strips were reprinted. In September 2009, Dave Eastbury returned as artist.

In July 2013, Ball Boy was taken over by Alexander Matthews who revamped the strip with a new look and a new emphasis on parodying specific incidents in modern football, such as the ownership of Premier League clubs by foreign investors. Between May 2017 and September 2017 Vince Pavey wrote the strip. Danny Pearson took over writing duties in August 2017.

== Characters ==
- Ball Boy – the captain of the team. He plays striker for the team.
- Titch – A small boy who usually plays in defence. He was given his own short strip in The Beano Annual 2002.
- Dimmy – A defender, who is quite dim, hence his name.
- Benjy – A good player on the team, Benjy is Ball Boy's best friend.
- Goalie – the goalkeeper. In some strips he is a superb goalkeeper and in others he is comically awful, letting in everything. There are a few strips where he just sits in the corner of the goal, reading, because the rest of the team can't get a shot on target.
- Chandra Singh – A midfielder and Ball Boy's other best friend.
- Redcardo - Ball Boy's arch rival when Alexander Matthews drew the strip
- Sheikh Amassif Bin Bagh - A sheikh who buys Ball Boy's football team during Alexander Matthews' tenure as Ball Boy artist.

== Other Appearances ==
- Alongside regular appearances in The Beano, Ball Boy and his team have also been featured frequently in The Beano Annual, BeanoMax and The Beano Comic Library.
- Robert Harrop featured Ball Boy in their Beano & Dandy figure collection.
