= Toxic (magazine) =

British comics magazine

- Editor: Team Toxic
- Categories: Boy's magazine
- Frequency: Fortnightly
- Total circulation: 35,087 (2017)
- First issue: September 2002
- Company: Egmont
- Country: United Kingdom
- Based in: London
- Language: English
- Website: www.toxicmag.co.uk

Toxic magazine is a British comics magazine launched in September 2002 by London-based Egmont Publishing. The intention was to address the elusive boys' magazine market. The magazine's content was originally themed around gross out topics, although this has been significantly reduced over time. The magazine has proved to be extremely successful and the title continues to be published today.

Toxic is "edited" by Team Toxic, a group of creatures under the supervision of Doc Shock.

Key content strands include movies, gaming (traditional and virtual world), TV, DVD, jokes, comics, sport, cars, celebrity, competition prizes and how-to.

Initially launched as a monthly title, Toxic increased frequency to every three weeks with issue 14, then to fortnightly with issue 34.
