= Nutty =

British comic magazine

- A typical mid-run issue of Nutty (6 March 1982)

Publication information
- Publisher: D. C. Thomson & Co. Ltd
- Publication date: 16 February 1980 – 14 September 1985.
- No. of issues: 292

Nutty was a British comic magazine that ran for 292 issues from 16 February 1980 to 14 September 1985, when it merged with The Dandy. Published by D. C. Thomson & Co. Ltd, Nutty was an attempt to create a more lively and chaotic comic compared to many on sale at the time.

== Strips ==
Nutty's strips included:

- Bananaman was its main strip, and by far its most popular. Drawn by John Geering, it survived the merger with The Dandy and that comic's eventual closure in the 2010s, moving to The Beano.
- Big 'n Bud was a double-act style comic strip: they observed various scenarios, and then made jokes based upon what they observed. They appeared in the first edition.
- Blubba and the Bear, an Eskimo in conflict with a polar bear trying to steal his fish, who later appeared in the Dandy as reprints from number 3408 but ended when Dandy Xtreme started.
- Cannonball Kid, "He's Football Crazy", similar to a Beano strip called Ball Boy, later reprinted as The Dandy's Owen Goal.
- Cuddles, a naughty baby. The strip was drawn by Barrie Appleby and later moved to Hoot before joining Dimples in The Dandy.
- Dick Turban, Desert Highwayman, a boy desert raider who rode a camel.
- Doodlebug, a slightly surreal tale of a bug in a comic-book world who could draw and remove things with a magic pencil. The other inhabitants of this world were also bugs, with their names reflecting their personality. Humbug, for instance was of a miserable disposition. Bedbug was portrayed as a sleepy character, often seen in bed or at least in bedclothes. These characters often reappeared, but it wasn't always the same character that had been seen previously. The strip was drawn by Gordon Bell
- Ethel Red, a Viking girl.
- General Jumbo, a new series of the former Beano character, drawn by Sandy Calder.
- Horace Cope, a boy of the same name who enlisted help from his grandmother, Madame Zsa Zsa, an astrologer.
- Jay R. Hood, "He's Anything But Good", a junior version of J. R. Ewing, drawn by George Martin.
- Micro Dot, a girl who consulted her BBC Micro for advice, drawn by Gordon Bell.
- Mitey Joe, about a small boy and his wish to be taller, drawn by John Geering.
- Nip and Rrip, a boy with a violent cat that bore a remarkable similarity to Gnasher, drawn by George Martin.
- Peter Pest, a boy who constantly interrupted his sister's attempt to be alone with her boyfriends. The title survived Dandy merger.
- Pig Tales, a family of pigs, similar to a Beano strip "The Three Bears".
- Ron Brown's Schooldays, the adventures of a group of schoolchildren. The title was a play on Tom Brown's Schooldays.
- Samuel Creeps, a school swot who outwitted bullies.
- Scoopy, "The Runaround Hound With a Nose For News", a dog journalist, drawn by Gordon Bell.
- The Snobbs and the Slobbs, a rich-family-versus-poor-family strip. Drawn by John Geering, the strip survived Dandy merger.
- Snoozer, similar to Whizzer and Chips' Lazy Bones at the time, this strip concerned a boy who kept falling asleep. It was drawn by Gordon Bell.
- Stevie Starr, a young television star who was seen making, or starring in, a different show each week. It also appeared in The Topper.
- Whoops-A-Daisy, a mischievous girl, drawn by Barry Appleby.
- The Wild Rovers, a group of dogs who had comedy adventures.
