= Bea (Dennis the Menace) =

Comic strip character from The Beano

- The Beano character
- First appearance: "2931"; 19 September 1998

In-universe information
- Full name: Beatrice Menace

Beatrice "Bea" Menace is a fictional character from the British comic magazine The Beano. She was born in issue 2931 (introduced by David Parkins) and is the baby sister of Dennis the Menace. She appears frequently in her brother's comic strip, but would receive comic strips of her own to star in, including a crossover comic strip with Ivy the Terrible.

She is very flatulent and often farts. She uses her farts as a way of menacing.

== Physical appearance ==
Bea's appearance is extremely similar to her elder brother's in that she sports short jet-black messy hair and a behind the nose grin. She is a toddler who wears a striped yellow and black onesie with a short ponytail with a yellow hair band to match. After the 2009 re-launch of Dennis and Gnasher, eyelashes were added to her appearance and she became far more baby-like in not only looks but also personality.

David Parkins had always intended that the character would be called "Bea" (short for Beatrice), but the comic staff decided to put the name up for a reader vote. The readers seemed to agree with Parkins, as "Bea" won the vote by a nearly two-thirds majority. Dennis' Mum regularly shouts, "Bea! No!" whenever she misbehaves.

== Publication history ==
=== Introduction to The Beano ===
As part of The Beano's 60th anniversary, issue 2925 teased a "big surprise". Five issues later, Dennis' parents announced his mother was pregnant, making Dennis faint in shock, but ended on a cliffhanger as his mother went into labour and rushed to the nearby hospital. The front cover of the following issue showed Dennis' delighted father rushing out of the maternity ward to tell his son (and Gnasher) "It's a girl!" The story inside showed Dennis and Gnasher's worry that a little sister would mean constant crying, baby toys all over the house, and that she could grow up to be an ultra-feminine little girl obsessed with makeup and perfume, who over-occupies the bathroom. The final panels reveal he has nothing to worry about as Walter takes a family photo that shows Bea kicking her father in the mouth and spraying her mother with a milk bottle. She would later win the vote for naughtiest baby in Beanotown at a week old.

=== Solo stories ===
In issue 2935, Bea starred in Beaginnings drawn by Nigel Parkinson. It was about her misbehaviour at home, saying her first word ("mud") and playing with her older brother's pets. The title changed to Dennis's Little Sister Bea – the Mini-Menace from issue 3099, but was also known as Bea. She shares notable similarities with fellow Beano character, Ivy the Terrible, who, from August 2008, joined Bea in her strip, renamed Bea and Ivy. Nigel Parkinson continued as artist, as Ivy had been reprinted before the team up.

Bea's own strip returned for a few issues in 2009, however, this was dropped later that year, mainly due to her older brother's relaunch. In 2010 Bea joined up with Gnipper and Harley, Gran's pet pig, in a new strip titled The Bea Team, the title being a parody of The A-Team film which was released around the time the strip was in The Beano. In 2014, Bea returned to her strip drawn by Nigel Parkinson.

=== Subsequent appearances ===
Issue 2942 (5 December 1998) was a special issue dedicated to her, where she appeared in every strip in the comic.

Bea makes appearances in the CBBC series Dennis the Menace and Gnasher.
