= Bananaman =

British comic book character

- DC Thomson comic strip character(s)

Publication information
- Creator(s): Steve Bright (writer/artist); Dave Donaldson (writer); John Geering (artist)
- Other contributors: Barrie Appleby; Tom Paterson; Wayne Thompson; Nigel Auchterlounie; Kev F Sutherland; Cavan Scott; Tommy Donbavand; Danny Pearson; Morris Heggie
- Current/last artist: Ned Hartley; Wayne Thompson

First appearance
- The Beano: Issue #3618 (14 January 2012)
- The Dandy: Issue #2287 (21 September 1985)
- Nutty: Issue #1 (16 February 1980)

Last appearance
- The Dandy: Issue #3610 (11 December 2012)
- Nutty: Issue #292 (14 September 1985)

Main character
- Name: Bananaman
- Alias(es): Eric Allan; Eric Wimp; Little Eric; Eric Wenk Bannerman
- Family: Bananagirl (cousin)
- Friend(s): Chief O'Reilly, Crow
- Powers: Superhuman strength Flight; Invulnerability; Breathing in space Helium-boosted heat finger Also equipped with gadgets: Thermal Banana, Banana Laser Gun, electronic thermal underwear.
- Weakness(es): Immense stupidity (quoted as having "The muscles of twenty men, and the brains of twenty mussels")

Bananaman is a fictional character appearing in British comic books. Bananaman is a parody of traditional superheroes, being portrayed as a schoolboy who is transformed into a muscled, caped adult man when he eats a banana. The character originally appeared in Nutty as the back page strip in Issue 1, dated 16 February 1980 drawn by John Geering.

He has since appeared in The Dandy and The Beano.

== Original strip ==
The original strip, by Dave Donaldson and Steve Bright, written and developed by the latter, and mostly drawn by John Geering until his death in 1999, is essentially a parody of Superman and Batman with elements of Captain Marvel and his British twin, Marvelman, and occasionally other Silver Age characters, while also combining comic slapstick with a heavy dose of eccentric British humour similar to Alan Moore's contemporary work on Captain Britain.

After John Geering died in 1999, Barrie Appleby took over and later Tom Paterson. In 2003, the original scriptwriter, Steve Bright, drew it, until 2007. Sporadically from 2007 to 2010 the character appeared in reprinted strips from the John Geering era. For a short time, in the end of 2008, artist Chris McGhie reinvented Bananaman in a series of new strips.

McGhie's other work included The Three Bears for The Beano (in 2002) and the characters on Yoplait's 'Wildlife' product range. Two new strips drawn by Barrie Appleby appeared that year as well.

Following the Dandy revamp of October 2010, Wayne Thompson took over drawing Bananaman in a style reminiscent of French cartoonist Lisa Mandel. Thompson was a popular artist in The Dandy who had previously drawn Jak, Agent Dog 3-Zero and, occasionally, Bully Beef and Chips.

In Issue 3515, Thompson's style changed notably, becoming more cartoonish and detailed. As of spring 2011, Thompson's version of Bananaman appears in full colour over two pages. From 1983 to 1986, Bananaman also had his own annual. This was unusual because, unlike many other comics at the time, Nutty never had an annual.

Unlike Dennis the Menace and Bash Street Kids, which mostly consisted of reprints, all the material in these annuals was new. In Issue 3618, dated 14 January 2012, Bananaman made his debut appearance, as John Geering reprints, in The Beano; however, he continued to appear in The Dandy. Another Beano character, Bananagirl of Super School, was revealed to be his cousin.

The Dandy print comic ended in December 2012, but Bananaman was still seen in the digital version, now drawn by Andy Janes, until the digital Dandy was itself cancelled in July 2013. New Bananaman strips drawn by Wayne Thompson and written by Nigel Auchterlounie, Kev F Sutherland and lately Cavan Scott continued to run in The Beano throughout 2014.

In 2016, writing duties for the strip were taken over by Tommy Donbavand and Danny Pearson, and since 2018, Bananaman has been written by Ned Hartley.

== Character ==
In the strip, Eric Wimp, an ordinary schoolboy living at 29 Acacia Road, Nuttytown (later changed to Dandytown and then Beanotown when the strip moved to other comics), eats a banana to transform into Bananaman, an adult superhero, sporting a distinctive cowled blue and yellow outfit complete with a yellow two-tailed cape resembling a banana skin. It is not consistent whether Eric and Bananaman are two separate people or whether Eric merely acts as Bananaman's secret identity - depending on the comic in question, Bananaman may either refer to Eric in the first person or the third person, and vice versa for Eric referring to Bananaman.

His superpowers include the ability to fly, superhuman strength (often quoted as "the strength of twenty men... twenty big men"), and invulnerability. His primary weakness is his lack of intelligence, lacking common sense and often causing damage through foolish strategies (quoted as having "the muscles of twenty men, and the brains of twenty mussels").

If Bananaman needs extra power, bananas can be eaten for strength boosts, provided by his faithful pet crow; if he does not have enough strength to shatter an ice block, for example, after eating another banana, he will have enough. However, increasing his strength usually comes at the cost of further reducing his intelligence. The type of banana in question can also impact the transformation, with many comics using this as the base of the story in question. The effects of eating different bananas are not consistent from story to story, but one example is in the 2006 Dandy Annual where Eric eats a rotten banana that causes Bananaman to turn into a malicious supervillain that even his usual villains are afraid of.

== Varying origins ==
Eric Wimp was rocketed to Earth from the Moon as a baby, and gained his powers because the crescent moon resembles a banana. Bananaman resembles Superman in having a kryptonite style weakness to mouldy bananas, and a Fortress of Solitude style building at the North Pole, made out of a giant banana.

During early board meetings, the designers thought of having Bananagirl accompany the series. The girl would have been called Margaret Wimp, and be the "sister" of Eric. This idea was scrapped later in production, because the concept of two children being related without parents would be too far-fetched for children to understand; however, the idea was revived for a Beano comic strip.

In the 1991 Dandy Annual, Bananaman's origin was changed to that of being a normal Earth baby in a maternity hospital, who obtained his powers after unintentionally eating a banana in which General Blight had hidden a stolen supply of 'Saturnium', and accidentally left it next to Eric. However, later issues referred to the first origin as the real one, causing future comics to poke fun at the idea that his true origins are a mystery.

== Other characters ==
Bananaman initially faced a different pastiche supervillain each week, who were often lampoons of the kind of single issue, uncreatively named villains that heroes fought during the Silver Age, or tips of the hat to famous supervillains. Bananaman's arch enemy is General Blight, a parody of Adolf Hitler and generic criminal mastermind who in later strips largely replaced the criminal of the week.

Other villains included mad scientist Doctor Gloom, Bananaman's evil fruit counterpart Appleman, the mischief making Weatherman and dessert fiend Captain Cream.

Eric's punk-style shaved head was replaced by a more typical 1980s-style haircut, Bananaman gained a talking crow sidekick called simply Crow, and Bananaman became so stupid he often forgot how to fly or to use the door. Eventually, Bananaman even began to go to school despite being an adult.

Bananaman is allied with Chief O'Reilly, a stereotyped Irish policeman (apparently in homage to Batman's James Gordon or the equally stereotyped Chief O'Hara in the 1960s Batman television series). He used to wear an Indian feather headdress as a visual pun on Chief, and in later strips wore a hat with a flashing blue light on the top.

Chief works in a police station shaped like a giant police helmet, which frequently has to be rebuilt after Bananaman accidentally destroys it (as Bananaman always enters by flying through the wall instead of using the door). The majority of Bananaman strips open with Chief phoning Eric to inform him of a situation that requires Bananaman's help. Chief is unaware of Bananaman's secret identity and instead believes Eric to be his personal assistant/friend.

== Television cartoon series ==
From 1983 to 1986, the BBC aired a cartoon series based on Bananaman and featuring the voices of the members of The Goodies. It was produced by 101 Productions. Parts of the character were changed for the series: he was now called Eric Twinge, had a distinctive banana-shaped hairstyle rather than punk stubble, and had a love interest (only when transformed) in the form of Fiona, a newsreader based on Selina Scott and also a possible homage to Lois Lane.

Graeme Garden (incorrectly credited as Greame Garden on some episodes) voiced the characters of Bananaman, General Blight and Maurice of The Heavy Mob, Bill Oddie voiced the characters of Crow, Chief O'Reilly, Doctor Gloom and the Weatherman, and Tim Brooke-Taylor voiced the characters of Eric, King Zorg of the Nerks, Eddie the Gent, Auntie, and Appleman, as well as narrating the episodes.

Jill Shilling voiced Fiona and any additional female characters, including Eric's cousin Samantha (but not her mother Auntie). The programme lasted for forty episodes between 3 October 1983 and 15 April 1986.

Bananaman was aired in the United States by the Nickelodeon cable network, as a companion piece to Danger Mouse, but Bananaman never came close to reaching that series' American popularity. The show also aired during the Australian Broadcasting Corporation's (ABC) after-school timeslot, and is considered one of the Classic ABC shows.

In 1997, some episodes of Bananaman were used on the cartoon series The Pepe and Paco Show, created by HIT Entertainment.

Some of these episodes would eventually reappear in print form in The Dandy in 1998, coinciding with the BBC repeating the series that year, and were reprinted in the comic in the spring of 2007, now promoting the DVD. Each episode was roughly five minutes long. Phrases from the show, "twenty big men" and "ever alert for the call to action", are still used in the comic today.

On 22 February 2021, Fox Entertainment announced that they would be producing a new Bananaman series with Bento Box Entertainment.

== Film adaptation ==
In March 2014, it was announced that DC Thomson, in conjunction with Elstree Studio Productions, would be producing a movie on Bananaman, with a release date in 2015. In May 2014, DC Thomson unveiled the first teaser poster for the film. By September 2015, the official website stated "coming soon" instead of 2015. In September 2015, it was announced that the movie was in the early stages.

In January 2016, the Bananaman musical's page on Facebook posted that the movie adaptation is now in development, saying "This fruitiest of superheroes is experiencing a revival elsewhere – Bananaman The Movie is also in development". However, a release date was not mentioned.

On 8 June 2016, the now newly formed Beano Studios issued a press release. The release noted that Beano Studios was formed to bring their properties to life through television, film and live performances based upon present projects which were being worked on. "Beano Studios is currently also exploring plans to take Beano characters to the bigger screens and stages worldwide."

By June 2017, the official site had been removed, and no further updates on the status of the movie had been provided as of 2026.

== Musical production ==
Near the beginning of January 2016, it was reported that Bananaman would be turned into a musical for West End. An industry launch took place on 2 February 2016, showcasing the musical. The musical ran from the end of 2017 to the beginning of 2018, at the Southwark Playhouse in London. It is unknown if it will be produced worldwide.
