= Cuddles and Dimples =

British comic strip

Official artwork of Cuddles and Dimples from The Dandy

Cuddles and Dimples is a British comic strip published in the comic book magazine The Dandy. It was first published in 1986. The stories' protagonists are two toddler brothers who like to cause double the trouble wherever they go. The artist when the strip first started was Barrie Appleby, who continued until 2004 with a strip by Gordon Bell in the 1994 annual and a sole strip by Nigel Parkinson in 2003, who took over the strip next year as part of the revamp at that time.

== Publication history ==
Cuddles and Dimples actually started out as two separate strips. While Dimples started out in The Dandy on 27 October 1984, Cuddles had already been in Nutty since March 1981. When Nutty merged with The Dandy in 1985, Cuddles did not follow, instead becoming the cover character of Hoot. Hoot combined with The Dandy the following year, and the first Cuddles and Dimples story showed Cuddles' family moving to Dandytown, where he met Dimples. This took place in issue 2345, dated 1 November 1986. By late 1987, without explanation, one set of parents disappeared (Cuddles'), and the toddlers were said to be twins. Grounds for this change had been somewhat prepared previously by a short-lived spin-off strip called "That's Our Granny" which established that the two boys shared a grandmother.

For many years, the characters appeared in the centre pages (with full colour) of The Dandy. When they first appeared, they appeared in pages 16 and 17 of the then 20-page comic with red and black as the only colours.

The characters took over the front page of The Dandy from issue 3008 (July 1999) until October 2000, when they got 'thrown out' for misbehaving too much (in reality, readers wanted Desperate Dan back on the cover). They were both preceded and succeeded on the cover by Desperate Dan. By the time of the revamp in October 2004, Cuddles and Dimples were assigned to Nigel Parkinson to freshen up their look (prior to the new look, the strip had been reprinted since early 2004). Dimples was made the older brother and now has a patch of brown hair. He also became vaguely intelligent. Cuddles look was toned down from the grotesque little monster he was before, and was made the younger, more naive and disgusting brother. Both of them appeared slightly less childish; for example, they no longer called their parents "Mumsie and Daddums", instead calling them Mum and Dad. Their parents were also revamped, dad being a pot-bellied balding idiot and mum an up-to-date babe or a yummy mummy. The strip was axed with The Dandy's revamp in October 2010; however, they returned in reprints from February 2012 onwards.
