= The Dandy Annual =

British children's book

- The cover of the Dandy Book 2001

Publication information
- Publisher: D.C. Thomson & Co
- Schedule: Annual
- Format: Children's
- Genre: Comic strips
- Publication date: 1938–present
- No. of issues: 87
- Main character: Desperate Dan

The Dandy Annual is the name of a book that has been published every year since 1938, to tie in with the children's comic The Dandy. As of 2024 there have been 87 editions. The Dandy Annual still continues to be published, even though the weekly comic ended in 2013. The annuals are traditionally published in July or August, in time for Christmas, and since 1965 they have had the date of the following year on the cover. Before then no date was given.

From 1938 to 1951 the annual was called The Dandy Monster Comic. The name changed to The Dandy Book in 1952 and continued, the year changing for each subsequent annual, until the release of the 2003 book in 2002 when it was renamed The Dandy Annual. Despite the comic's relaunch as Dandy Xtreme in 2007, the annual was still known as The Dandy Annual. This is likely because the annuals of the time were mostly made up of Dandy Comix, due to the topical nature of the magazine's Xtreme content.

In unison with the comic at the time, the front cover usually featured Korky the Cat. After Desperate Dan took over the front page in 1984, the annual cover reflected this by featuring both Korky and Dan until the release of the 1991 book in 1990 – which was the first ever Dandy Annual to not feature Korky on the front cover in any way. He has made several appearances since then, despite the main focus shifting to Dan.

In 2006, the original 1939 Monster Comic was reprinted as a facsimile edition in a collector's slipcase.

== List of annuals ==
This information is necessary to identify older annuals which are not dated. If an annual is dated 1940, it would have been published in August 1939. Prices are in shillings and pence with one shilling equal to 5p.

The Dandy Monster Comic

- 1939: Desperate Dan, Korky the Cat, Keyhole Kate, and the Bamboo Town monkeys are holding up the letter "Y" of "Dandy". Price 2/6
- 1940: Korky the Cat is hanging from a trapeze, and Freddy the Fearless Fly is sitting upon his tail as he swings on it. Price 2/6
- 1941: Korky the Cat is leading the other then-current Dandy characters (with Freddy the Fly upon his baton), in a band. Price 3/-
- 1942: Desperate Dan is towing a rowing boat (which is carrying the other then-current Dandy characters) with his teeth. Price 3/6
- 1943: All the then-current Dandy characters are taking part in a bike race, and Korky is in the lead of all the others. Price 5/-
- 1944: Korky the Cat has been hit by a flying football (given that it has been kicked through his net by Desperate Dan). Price 6/-
- 1945: Korky the Cat on skis passed by Desperate Dan, who is using logs (with other characters sitting on them) as skis. Price 6/-
- 1946: Korky the Cat and other then-current Dandy characters are displayed in stars (and the Bellboy is aiming at them). Price 6/-
- 1947: Korky the Cat flies up into the air after landing on a blanket (which is held by all the other Dandy characters). Price 6/-
- 1948: Korky the Cat is operating all the other then-current Dandy characters (who are all portrayed as string puppets). Price 6/-
- 1949: Korky the Cat in a top hat and a bow tie while smoking a cigar, as he walks down a red carpet with Desperate Dan. Price 6/-
- 1950: Korky the Cat pours a kettle of boiling water into the sea upon a beach, with other characters in the background. Price 6/-
- 1951: Korky the Cat is the ringmaster of a circus, for which Desperate Dan is holding up an elephant in the background. Price 6/-
- 1952: "Korky's Toy Shop", with a mechanical Desperate Dan pushing a tin of red paint (on a shelf above Korky) onto him. Price 6/-

The Dandy Book

- 1953: Six pictures of Korky chasing mice (on account of the fact they have stolen his food) then having a slap-up feed. Price 6/-
- 1954: Four pictures of Korky stealing a fish which he then hides under a large red top hat (that he wears on his head). Price 6/-
- 1955: Four pictures of Korky fishing in front of a "No Fishing" sign (he is reading a paper when the gamekeeper comes). Price 6/-
- 1956: Four pictures of Korky on a ladder in front of Korky's Joke Shop (the red paint he used for the name disappears). Price 6/-
- 1957: Three pictures of Korky in a train with four fishermen. They go through a tunnel and he has eaten all their fish. Price 6/6
- 1958: Three pictures of Korky in a rowing boat, using a magnet to catch fish (even though fish are not made of metal!). Price 6/6
- 1959: Three pictures of Korky, first in a rowing boat, and then in a large umbrella after Hungry Horace sunk said boat. Price 6/6
- 1960: Three pictures of Korky eating a meal, while some mice try to jump up to a mailbox with chains wrapped around it. Price 7/-
- 1961: Three pictures of Korky balancing an egg on his nose, which falls on him and releases a gas which knocks him out. Price 7/6
- 1962: Three pictures of Korky leaning on a lamppost (he is smoking as a policeman comes, but the smoke is from a fish). Price 7/6
- 1963: Four pictures of Korky in a sailor suit looking through a porthole (he becomes sicker-looking with each new one). Price 7/6
- 1964: Three pictures of a professor lecturing, Korky answering him, and then sitting in a deckchair while eating a pie. Price 7/6
- 1965: Two pictures of Korky getting his own back on a pantomime horse which has trodden on his tail, with itchy powder. Price 7/6

From 1966 all books were dated.

- 1966: Korky is swinging in a giant boot which he borrowed from a circus stilt-walker who can be seen in the background. Price 7/6
- 1967: Korky is rolling a giant snowball down a hill (which has gathered up some interfering mice in it on its travels). Price 7/6
- 1968: Korky is dressed up as Santa Claus, with a sack of presents (some interfering mice are attempting to steal them). Price 7/6
- 1969: Korky is about to eat a Christmas pudding, and some interfering mice are on a shelf above him trying to steal it. Price 7/6
- 1970: Three pictures of Korky discovering that the interfering mice have eaten up all of his food on Christmas morning. Price 8/6
- 1971: Korky is holding a picture of a tomato with a sail sticking out of it (a "tomato sloop" – as the book called it). Price 9/6
- 1972: Korky is holding a glove puppet of Santa Claus; on the back cover, he squeezes it to squirt two interfering mice. Price 50p
- 1973: Korky is balancing a string of sausages and a Christmas pudding on his nose. On the back, we see they are frozen. Undated (Pre-production?) copies do exist of this annual. Price 55p
- 1974: Korky is playing a drum and all the mice are following him. On the back cover he takes some food out of the drum. Price 55p
- 1975: Korky is wearing a bulging top hat. On the back cover, some mice steal the hidden stash of sweets inside the hat. Price 60p
- 1976: Korky is loading up the wagons of a model train with sweets. On the back cover, two mice change the track points. Price 70p
- 1977: Korky is blowing up a giant yellow balloon (which has the face of Santa Claus upon it). On the back cover, a group of four interfering mice throw their harpoons at it and make it explode, but the resulting blast of the explosion knocks them all out. Price 90p
- 1978: Korky is dressed up as Santa Claus (holding three mice in a cage). On the back cover, one of the mice uses a peashooter to spit a pea at Korky's right paw, forcing him to drop the cage in his pain (and on landing, the door opens and frees all three). Price £1
- 1979: Korky is having a punch-up with an octopus (or "octo-puss" – as the book referred to it upon its fourth page). Price £1.15
- 1980: Korky's comic bronco ride – and the "bronco" in question happens to be a Doberman dog. The story is continued on the front and back end-papers of the book, and on the back cover, Korky lands on top of the Doberman (and knocks him out as a result). Price £1.25
- 1981: Korky and Santa Claus are "dashing through the snow", in a soap-box cart. On the back cover, Santa tells Korky that he was going too fast to stop at the Christmas Party Hall, and that he has to shove him back there as a result of what he had done. Price £1.40
- 1982: Korky is in a barrel with a spring in the bottom, and being chased by a policeman and a gamekeeper to a river. Price £1.60
- 1983: Korky is putting a coin into his robot money box. On the back cover, the moneybox beats up some watching mice. Price £1.80
- 1984: Korky's nephew Lipp (black, like Korky himself) takes a photo of him dressed as a footballer, while Bully Beef prepares to squirt him with his water pistol. On the back cover, Korky stands upon the football, which squirts Bully Beef full in the face. Price £2
- 1985: Desperate Dan carries Korky's car over a footbridge. On the back cover, we see that cars have a £1 toll on it. Price £2.25
- 1986: Desperate Dan playing a one-man band, very badly (and shattering all the windows in Dandytown's buildings as a result), as other characters put their fingers in their ears, and Korky applauds him. On the back cover, we see that Korky is a glazier. Price £2.45
- 1987: Desperate Dan and Korky having a bicycle race. On the back cover, Dan stops, just short of the finishing line as a mouse runs in front of him. Price £2.70
- 1988: All the characters are riding in a Viking longboat. On the back cover, the boat crashes on Dandytown's shores. Price £2.85
- 1989: Desperate Dan's shirt buttons fly off and Cuddles, Dimples, Korky and his three nephews attempt to catch them. Price £3.10
- 1990: Cuddles, Dimples, Dinah Mo, and Korky burst out of one of Desperate Dan's cow pies (as he is about to eat it). Price £3.25
- 1991: Dimples squirts his water pistol into one of Desperate Dan's ears; it comes out of the other one, and hits Cuddles full in the face. This annual also reveals the origins of Bananaman: Eric became him after he ate up a radioactive banana as a baby. Price £3.55
- 1992: Desperate Dan is holding a "Licence to Laugh" and all the other characters are pulling funny faces behind him. Price £3.80
- 1993: Dinah Mo, the Smasher, Cuddles, Dimples, and Korky are hanging on strings from a gigantic Desperate Dan's hat. Price £4.10
- 1994: Desperate Dan is being ridden by his Aunt Aggie and all the other characters are dressed up as knights. On the back cover, Aunt Aggie rides Dan off into the sunset (but the pennant on the front of her lance, which says "1994", cannot be seen now). Price £4.35
- 1995: Desperate Dan is bouncing across a field on a pogo stick while all the other characters are rushing to get out of his way. On the back cover, he jumps over the moon as a violin-holding cat (not Korky), a cow, a dog, a dish and a spoon watch (it is a reference to Hey Diddle Diddle). This annual also reveals the real names of Bananaman's enemies (when he went back to school). Price £4.50
- 1996: All the characters are trying to shelter from a thunderstorm. On the back cover, Dan is hit by a thunderbolt, where he has a metallic skeleton, akin to Wolverine, a miniature furnace for a stomach, and a pump for a heart. The endpaper of this annual, showing Desperate Dan's relations, was the basis for the "Wild West Test" track in Beanotown Racing. Price £4.75
- 1997: All the characters are performing stunts in a circus. On the back cover they are shot through the tent's roof. Price £4.99
- 1998: Desperate Dan and Beryl the Peril are having a pillow fight on a balance beam. On the back cover, Dan sneezes (as a result of the feathers flying out of Beryl's pillow), and then falls off the balance beam as she is rightfully declared the winner. Price £5.25
- 1999: Desperate Dan is playing a lamppost like a flute, and all the other then-current characters are following him. Price £16.90
- 2000: Desperate Dan is bouncing on the roof of the Millennium Dome. On the back cover, he has bounced onto the moon. Price £5.99
- 2001: Cuddles and Dimples have broken all the glass panes in a greenhouse and an angry policeman is writing the evidence down in his notebook. Desperate Dan, Korky, Brain Duane, and Bananaman are watching (the last one is also flying) in the background. Price £6.20
- 2002: Desperate Dan sits at a table with a load of empty cow pie dishes behind him as Aunt Aggie brings another one. Price £6.25

The Dandy Annual

- 2003: Cuddles and Dimples are rushing down a snow-covered hill on a sledge, and splattering Desperate Dan, Korky, Bananaman, the Sneaker, and Beryl the Peril as they pass by. This was the first annual that actually got referred to as "The Dandy Annual". Price £6.45
- 2004: Desperate Dan is carving his face into the Moon with his iron-girder skateboard (we see it on the back cover). Price £6.70
- 2005: Desperate Dan is holding a gigantic snow globe – inside which Cuddles and Dimples are having a snowball fight. On the back cover, Dan is trapped inside the snow globe while Cuddles and Dimples are outside laughing. Price £6.99
- 2006: Desperate Dan accidentally drops a toy box, which contains figures of all the other (then-current) characters. Price £6.99
- 2007: Desperate Dan is dressed as Santa Claus while all the other current characters are rushing for their presents. Price £7.25
- 2008: Desperate Dan is singing a song, while playing a guitar. On the back cover, we see the animals do not like it. Price £7.50
- 2009: Desperate Dan is paddling a canoe, and sending fish everywhere. On the back cover, we see his old friend Zeke. Price £7.99
- 2010: Desperate Dan and a bear are having an arm wrestling match. On the back cover, they both fall into the ground. Price £7.99
- 2011: Desperate Dan is in Cactusville holding Jak and Todd with all the other characters standing behind them. Features the tag-line "Making The Nation Laugh Since 1937". Price £7.99
- 2012: Desperate Dan is sitting on a horse, that is jumping angrily into the air while all the other characters look on. Features a "75th Birthday Edition" logo (similar to how some printings of the 1988 annual had the "Dandy/Beano 50 Years Young" logo). Price £7.99
- 2013: All the characters are at a party that is celebrating the Dandy's 75th birthday (even if it was its last day). Price £7.99
- 2014: Desperate Dan is eating a cow pie, prepared by his old Aunt Aggie (this was the first after the comic folded). Price £7.99
- 2015: Desperate Dan, Korky the Cat, Brassneck, Keyhole Kate, the Smasher, Winker Watson, the Jocks and the Geordies and Corporal Clott are playing football. Price £7.99
- 2016: It's the Strictly Cactusville Wild West Barn Dance, and Desperate Dan is spinning his partner, as other characters watch. Greedy Pigg, Mr Creep (Winker Watson's teacher), and Corporal Clott are serving as judges. Price £7.99
- 2017: Korky, Brassneck, Desperate Dan and Bery the Peril are having a selfie at Mount Laughmore (a parody of Mount Rushmore with Brassneck, Dan, Beryl's grumpy faces). On the back cover, Brassneck and Dan are both playing music while Beryl covers her ears and Korky eats a piece of chicken. Also, the faces on Mount Laughmore are now happy. Price £7.99
- 2018: Dandys 80th Anniversary, showing different characters at the Cactusville 80th Anniversary. Desperate Dan is winning a tug o-war against several characters, including Corporal Clott (Who is using a tank) by having the rope only tied around his little finger. Smasher is at the Crock Smash game, Keyhole Kate is looking at a 'What The Sheriff Saw' show, Blinky is waving but it's unsure at what or who. Aunt Aggie is, of course, carrying a Cow Pie over for the Tug O-war winner. Price £7.99
- 2019: The Dandytown football team are holding Desperate Dan up who is holding a cow pie trophy. Price £7.99
- 2020: Various characters are surrounded by red paint cans below the Dandy logo with is dripping with wet paint. Price £7.99
- 2021: Desperate Dan is carrying a metal iron version of The Dandytown logo as various other characters look on. Price £7.99
- 2022: Desperate Dan is snowboarding off a cliff next to a sign that says "No Snowboarding" as various characters watch on. Price £7.99
- 2023: The characters are working at a circus, Desperate Dan is holding up 2 water barrel with Cuddles and Dimples in them, Korky the Cat is jumping a flaming hoop, another character is juggling balls while balancing on a ball while Benyl the Peril is also juggling on a unicycle. Price £7.99
- 2024: Desperate Dan dressed as a superhero is carrying a carriage with various other character sitting in and on top of it. Price £7.99
- 2025: Various characters are at the entrance of a saloon called Dan's Place. Price £7.99
- 2026: Desperate Dan is fighting against a fire breathing Dragon with a water pistol and using a cow pie tin as a shield while various other characters watch on. Price £7.99

== See also ==
- List of Dandy comic strips by annual
- List of DC Thomson publications
