= The Dandy =

Scottish children's comic

- Front page of first issue

Publication information
- Publisher: D. C. Thomson & Co.
- Schedule: Weekly* (some issues were out longer than a week)
- Format: Comics anthology
- Genre: Children's, humour
- Publication date: 4 December 1937 – 4 December 2012 (physical), 4 December 2012 – 6 June 2013 (online), 1938 – present (as a yearly annual and summer special)

Creative team
- Artist(s): Nigel Parkinson; Lew Stringer; Charlie Grigg; Wayne Thompson; Stu Munro; Paul Palmer; Wilbur Dawbarn; Nigel Auchterlounie; Jamie Smart; Karl Dixon; Nik Holmes; Phil Corbett; Alexander Matthews; Duncan Scott; Stephen Waller; Andy Fanton
- Editor(s): Albert Barnes; George Morgan Thomson; Dave Torrie; Morris Heggie; Craig Graham; Craig Ferguson

The Dandy is a British children's comic magazine published by the Dundee based publisher DC Thomson. The first issue was printed in December 1937, making it the world's third-longest running comic, after Il Giornalino (cover dated 1 October 1924) and Detective Comics (cover dated March 1937). From August 2007 until October 2010, it was rebranded as Dandy Xtreme.

One of the best selling comics in the UK, along with The Beano (also made by DC Thomson), The Dandy reached sales of two million a week in the 1950s. The final printed edition was issued on 4 December 2012, the comic's 75th anniversary, after sales slumped to 8,000 a week. On the same day, The Dandy relaunched as an online comic, The Digital Dandy, appearing on the Dandy website and in the Dandy App. The digital relaunch was not successful and the comic ended just six months later. The Dandy title continues as a yearly Summer Special and the unbroken run of Dandy Annuals, up to and including the 2026 annual.

== History ==
The first issue, under the name The Dandy Comic, was published on 4 December 1937. The most notable difference between this and other comics of the day was the use of speech balloons instead of captions under the frame. It was published weekly until 6 September 1941, when wartime paper shortages forced it to change to fortnightly, alternating with The Beano. It returned to weekly publication on 30 July 1949. From 17 July 1950 the magazine changed its name to The Dandy. One of those involved in the comic in its early days was George Thomson, who served as deputy editor, and briefly - when aged 18 - as editor. Thomson would later serve as a cabinet minister under Harold Wilson and as European Commissioner.

In 1938, less than a year after the comic's debut, the first Dandy Annual was released. Originally called The Dandy Monster comic, this was an annual bumper edition of the comic and has been released annually since then. In 1954 the first Desperate Dan Book was released, mostly consisting of reprints. Another was released in 1978, and it was released yearly between 1990 and 1992. Bananaman and Black Bob surprisingly also had their own annuals.

Although later issues were all comic strips, early issues had many text strips, with some illustrations. In 1940, this meant 12 pages of comic strips and 8 pages of text stories. Text stories at two pages each were "Jimmy's Pocket Grandpa", "British Boys and Girls Go West", "There's a Curse on the King" and "Swallowed by a Whale!"

In 1963 the first Dandy summer special was published, a joint Dandy-The Beano summer special; the first exclusively Dandy Summer Special was released the following year.

In 1982 the Dandy comic libraries were released, which later became known as the Fun Size Dandy. These were small-format comics usually featuring one or two long stories starring characters from The Dandy and occasionally other DC Thomson comics.

In September 1985, the ailing Nutty was merged with The Dandy, bringing with it the Bananaman strip. Just over a year later, the short-lived Hoot was also merged with The Dandy, most notably incorporating the character Cuddles into the pre-existing comic strip Dimples to form Cuddles and Dimples, another of The Dandy's longest running comic strips.

After issue 3282 (dated 16 October 2004) The Dandy underwent a radical format overhaul. The comic changed format and content, reflecting a more television-oriented style, now printed on glossy magazine paper instead of gravure. The price was raised from 70p to £1.20 (99p for the first two weeks), a new comic strip called "Office Hours" (a comic strip about the adventures of the writers of The Dandy) appeared, and two supposedly new ones also started, though they were actually revivals from a few years earlier ("Jak" and "Dreadlock Holmes").

In August 2007 (issue 3426), The Dandy had another update, becoming the fortnightly comic-magazine hybrid Dandy Xtreme, priced at £2.50. Unlike previous incarnations, Dandy characters did not necessarily grace the cover every issue; instead, celebrities and other cartoon characters were featured; the first Dandy Xtreme had Bart Simpson on the cover. The Dandy Xtreme had a theme for each issue, usually a film or TV show.

Dandy stamp issued by Royal Mail

From 27 October 2010 (issue 3508) The Dandy returned as a weekly comic and dropped "Xtreme" from its title. The contents received a major overhaul, and all the comic strips from the Xtreme era except for Desperate Dan, Bananaman and The Bogies were dropped. Bananaman was also taken over by a new artist, Wayne Thompson, and Korky the Cat, who appeared in the comic's first issue in 1937, made a return drawn by Phil Corbett. Korky's strip was changed from 1–2 pages to 3 panels, to make way for new comics. Many new celebrity spoofs such as Cheryl's Mole became a feature, but other new strips included Pre-Skool Prime Minister and George vs Dragon, drawn by Jamie Smart and Andy Fanton. The 76-page Christmas special featured a pantomime, a 12-page Harry Hill strip, free gifts, and the return of some characters. More recent new strips are "Punslinger", "Dad's Turn To Cook", "My Freaky Family", "Animals Eat The Funniest Things", "Star T.Rex" and "Brian Damage". Song parodies and fake recipes also appeared in The Dandy.

On 19 March 2012 the Royal Mail launched a special stamp collection to celebrate Britain's rich comic book history, which included The Dandy among many others.

A follow-up to Waverly Book's The History of The Beano: The Story So Far, called The Art and History of The Dandy, was released in August 2012, The Dandy's 75th anniversary year. A Waverly book about The Dandy was originally to be released in 2007 for the comic's 70th birthday, but was cancelled with no explanation.

On 16 August 2012, D.C. Thomson announced that The Dandy would end its print run at the end of the year and transition to an online format, with the last issue being released on 4 December 2012, exactly 75 years after the first issue was released in 1937. This followed reports that weekly sales of the comic had dropped to an all-time low of less than 8,000 a week. The final issue of the comic (issue 3610) was 100 pages long and featured a countdown of the comic's "Top 75 Characters", as well as a full reprint of the comic's first ever issue. Earlier in the year, Bananaman had entered sister comic The Beano, allowing the character to continue without The Dandy.

As promised, The Dandy was immediately relaunched online as the "Digital Dandy" following the end of its print run, featuring a combination of existing and new characters. However, the Digital Dandy was not successful and was ultimately cancelled on 4 July 2013 after just 13 issues. Reasons given included frequent technical issues on the site and a failure to reach a younger audience. While this was the end of The Dandy as a weekly comic, new Summer Specials and Annuals continue to be released every year as of 2026.

== Editors ==
The original editor was Albert Barnes, who according to The Legend of Desperate Dan (1997) was the model for Dan's famous chin. Barnes remained in the role until 1982, when he was succeeded by Dave Torrie. His replacement, Morris Heggie, left the editorship in 2006 to become the DC Thomson archivist. The final editor of the print edition was Craig Graham. The editor of the digital version launched in 2012 was Craig Ferguson.

== Dandy comic strips ==
Over its 75-year run hundreds of different comic strips have appeared in The Dandy, many of them for a very long time. The longest-running strips are Desperate Dan and Korky the Cat, who both appeared in the first issue. Following mergers with Nutty and Hoot, the Dandy inherited a number of their strips, most notably Bananaman from Nutty and Cuddles from Hoot, who teamed up with a Dandy character to form a new strip entitled Cuddles and Dimples. Both have been quite long-running, having been in the Dandy since the 1980s and each having appeared on the front cover of both The Dandy and the comics from which they originated. After the closure of The Beezer and The Topper, The Dandy inherited some of its strips as well, including Beryl the Peril, Puss 'n' Boots (who had been in Sparky before being moved to The Topper) and Owen Goal (who appeared in Nutty under a different title).

The comic has had a number of different cover stars (comic strips appearing on the front cover), firstly Korky the Cat, who was on the cover from 1937 to 1984. Desperate Dan, long since the comic's most popular character, then took over the cover, a position he retained until 1999 when he was replaced as cover star by Cuddles and Dimples. However, they were not on the cover for very long and Desperate Dan had been restored to the cover by the end of 2000. The comic revealed that Cuddles and Dimples were thrown off the cover for "being too naughty", though in reality the comic's readers wanted Dan to return as the cover strip. In 2004, following a major revamp, Desperate Dan was replaced on the front cover by Jak, a character created for the cover, slightly based on an older strip with the same name, although other characters, including Dan, also made occasional cover appearances. The front cover also had a subtitle, for example, "Better than the Beano". During the Dandy Xtreme era the comic had no cover star, and covers were often given over to celebrities or current trends, but after the comic returned to its weekly, all-comic format in October 2010, the popular British comedian Harry Hill took over the cover spot, accompanied by Desperate Dan and Bananaman in some issues (although other characters made one-off appearances too).

There were frequent fictional crossovers between Dandy characters, as most of the characters lived in the fictional Dandytown, just as the characters in The Beano were portrayed as living in Beanotown. Many of the comic strips in The Beano are drawn by the same artists, and crossovers between the two comics occur occasionally. Quite often, one comic would make a tongue-in-cheek jibe at the other (e.g. a character meeting an elderly lady and stating that she's "older than the jokes in The Beano"). In the strips, it was expressed that Dandytown and Beanotown are rivals, The Dandy did a drastic format change when Dandytown had an embassy in Beanotown, which many of the town's citizens unsuccessfully attempted to overrun – the embassy was never referred to in The Beano. This rivalry inspired the spin-off computer game Beanotown Racing, in which various characters from both comics could be raced around points in Beanotown, including the embassy. The game was given a great deal of advance publicity in the comics, with story lines often revolving around how each of the characters acquired his or her vehicle.

== Dundee ==
Thanks to The Dandy, The Beano and other D C Thomson comics which followed, Dundee gained a reputation as a major centre of the comics industry, and has been called the 'comic capital of Britain'. Partly as a result of this legacy, the city is now home to the Scottish Centre for Comic Studies. The connection is also marked by bronze statues of Desperate Dan and The Beano character Minnie the Minx installed in the city's High Street in 2001. Designed by Tony Morrow, the Desperate Dan statue, which also features his dog Dawg, is the most photographed of 120 pieces of public art in the city. In July 2001 the cover of The Dandy featured Dan visiting Dundee and encountering his statue. In December 2012 the University of Dundee held an exhibition in partnership with D C Thomson to mark the comic's 75th anniversary.

== See also ==
- The Magic Comic
