= James Smart =

James Smart may refer to:

- James Smart (architect), (1847–1903), Scottish architect
- James Smart (civil servant) (1888–1957), head of Canadian National Parks Branch, later Parks Canada
- James Smart (police officer) (1804–1870), British police officer
- James A. Smart (1858–1942), Canadian merchant and politician in Manitoba
- James S. Smart (1842–1903), American Member of Congress from New York state
- James H. Smart (1841–1900), American educator and president of Purdue University
- James H. Smart (aviator), American winner of the 1931 Ford National Reliability Air Tour
- James Smart (journalist), Kenyan journalist and news anchor
- James Smart (skater), British Fen skater

== See also ==
- Jamie Smart (born 1978), British comic artist and writer
- Jamie Smart (author), British author and speaker
