= The Rainbow Orchid =

- Cover art

Publication information
- Publication date: 2002 - 2012
- Main character: Julius Chancer

Creative team
- Written by: Garen Ewing
- Artist: Garen Ewing

Collected editions
- The Complete Rainbow Orchid: ISBN 1-4052-6385-7

The Rainbow Orchid is a comic written and drawn by Garen Ewing, the first of a series of planned Julius Chancer books. It is set in the 1920s and follows Chancer's expedition to discover the mythical 'Rainbow Orchid'. Starting in England, the adventure takes the characters first to France, then Karachi in India and into the Indus Valley. It is drawn in the ligne claire style and published in English by Egmont, in Dutch by Silvester Strips, in French by BD Must Editions, in Spanish by NetCom2 Editorial, and in German by Salleck Publications.

== Publication history ==
In 1997 a three page preview of The Rainbow Orchid appeared in Cherokee Comics' magazine Imagineers. Regular serialisation began in 2002 in BAM! magazine. When the first part was complete it was published as a black and white collection which sold out within months (the last copy was sold on eBay after some frantic last-minute bidding for £79). For a couple of years the strip was serialised online before being picked up and published in three volumes by Egmont UK in 2009, 2010 and 2012. The Complete Rainbow Orchid was published in English as a single album by Egmont in 2012 and a digital edition was produced by Panel Nine for their Sequential platform for iPad late in 2013. Garen also produced full annotations for the story in The Rainbow Orchid Supplement (2012).

In 2010 Silvester Strips published a Dutch edition. Spanish and French language editions followed from Netcom2 Editorial and BD Must Editions respectively, and in 2013 a German-language edition was published by Salleck Publications. In 2015, Tellerup produced a Danish edition.

== Plot ==
Julius Chancer, young assistant to the historical researcher Sir Alfred Catesby-Grey, becomes embroiled in an adventure to discover the lost Rainbow Orchid, largely due to the machinations of scheming Daily News reporter William Pickle. He is accompanied by silent film actress Lily Lawrence, her American agent Nathaniel Crumpole, and Benoit Tayaut, a French stunt-pilot. The search for the orchid is opposed by the devious Evelyn Crow, right hand associate to scheming businessman Urkaz Grope.

The adventure leads them up the Indus Valley and into Chitral, where they encounter the Kalash people, before heading further into the Hindu Kush. Eventually, they find themselves within a lost world, which may hide the secret of a forgotten super-weapon.

== Main characters ==
The book's main characters are:

- Julius Chancer: The young, slightly camp adventurer in the employ of Sir Alfred.
- Sir Alfred Catesby-Grey: An historical researcher, antiquarian to the King, and ex-director of the secretive Empire Survey Branch.
- Sir Reginald Pritchard Lawrence: The 15th Earl of Baggall, who "owns half of Staffordshire", he is the holder of the Trembling Sword of Tybalt Stone. Unfortunately he has a weakness for the bottle...
- Lily Lawrence: A young silent film star who is intent on saving her family estate and her father's reputation.
- Nathaniel Crumpole: Lily Lawrence's movie publicity agent, and wannabe film director.
- William Pickle: The nosy reporter, willing to stop at nothing to get his next scoop.
- Urkaz Grope: The evil tycoon intent on getting his hands on the Trembling Sword of Tybalt Stone. In choosing this name, Ewing was inspired by Dickens' Uriah Heep.
- Evelyn Crow: Grope's right hand associate. Clever, devious, subtle and she doesn't give up.
- Box: The largest and most brutish of Grope's henchmen.
- Benoit Tayaut: Former Hollywood stunt-pilot, now with his own acrobatic flying circus. Tayaut is French for Tally-ho!

== Inspirations ==
Ewing has cited several comics as inspirations, most of them drawn in the ligne claire style: Hergé's The Adventures of Tintin, Edgar P. Jacobs's Blake and Mortimer and Yves Chaland's Freddy Lombard. The story has its roots in the lost world adventure fiction of writers such as Rider Haggard, Jules Verne and Sir Arthur Conan Doyle.

== Prequels ==
The Girdle of Polly Hipple is four pages long and looks at one of the first reporting jobs of William Pickle. It first appeared in Twelve, a comic strip anthology from Accent UK. This comic had 12 different stories from 12 different creators, each story being based around one of the 12 tasks of Hercules. It was republished in French as "Le Ceinture de Polly Hipple" in a flip-book along with The Sword of Truth by BD Must in 2013.

The Sword of Truth is six pages long and looks at an event in the early career of Lily Lawrence. It first appeared in The Girly Comic issue 5 in May 2004, was translated into Dutch in 2010 (as "Het Zwaard Der Waarheid"), appearing in the comics magazine, Stripschrift, and into French in 2013 (as "L'Épée de Vérité"), published as a flip-book with The Girdle of Polly Hipple by BD Must. It tells the story of two actors struggling for Lily's affections on her first stage appearance.

The Secret of the Samurai is twenty pages long and is set a couple of years before the events in The Rainbow Orchid, featuring the search for a lost set of samurai armour in 1920s England. It was serialised in four episodes in The Phoenix in 2013.

== Books ==
- Volume 1 (48 pages, Egmont, August 2009, ISBN 1-4052-4853-X)
- Volume 2 (48 pages, Egmont, July 2010, ISBN 1-4052-5047-X)
- Volume 3 (48 pages, Egmont, April 2012, ISBN 1-4052-5599-4)
- Complete (144 pages, Egmont, September 2012, ISBN 1-4052-6385-7)

The Complete Rainbow Orchid includes 17 pages of extras in the form of sketches, research and notes.

== Reception ==
The Rainbow Orchid has received considerable critical acclaim. In 2013, it won the Young People’s Comic Award in the British Comic Awards. It was named The Observer's Graphic Novel of the Month for May 2012 and was shortlisted for a UK National Comic Award in 2004 within two categories, Best Independent Comic and Best New Talent. In its early days it was named Fool Britannia Small Press Comic of the Year 2003 by Comics Bulletin. The comedian Rhys Darby included it as his Cultural Highlight book in The Observer's 'On My Radar' in Jun 2012.

- "... I couldn't like it more if I tried ... It is all so beautifully done: the historical references are spot on ... the dialogue is pitch-perfect ... the result is one of the most satisfying comics around, whether you are a small boy, or a grown woman." - Rachel Cooke, The Observer
- "The between-the-wars setting is meticulously rendered, the storyline intricate and engrossing... Ewing has crafted something at once reverential and joyous that has a life of its own." - James Lovegrove, (Financial Times)
- "This is a spectacular work... the art is wonderfully attractive but what impressed me the most was the slow-burning, exquisitely constructed plot." - Comics International
- "The characters are real, the setting is authentic, and this opening chapter hints at many plot strands. It's got depth, charm and real polish." - TRS2
- "Tightly-plotted, well-researched and beautifully drawn, this book is a real delight. Garen Ewing's mix of engaging characters, exciting old-school adventure, attractive ligne claire artwork and fluid storytelling makes The Rainbow Orchid easily one of the best graphic novels of the year." - Bryan Talbot
- "...beneath the obvious beauty of the artwork is an equally great, old fashioned adventure tale. It works for children and it works for us adults. An absolutely cracking adventure story." - Forbidden Planet International blog
