= Garen Ewing =

British comics creator (b. 1969)

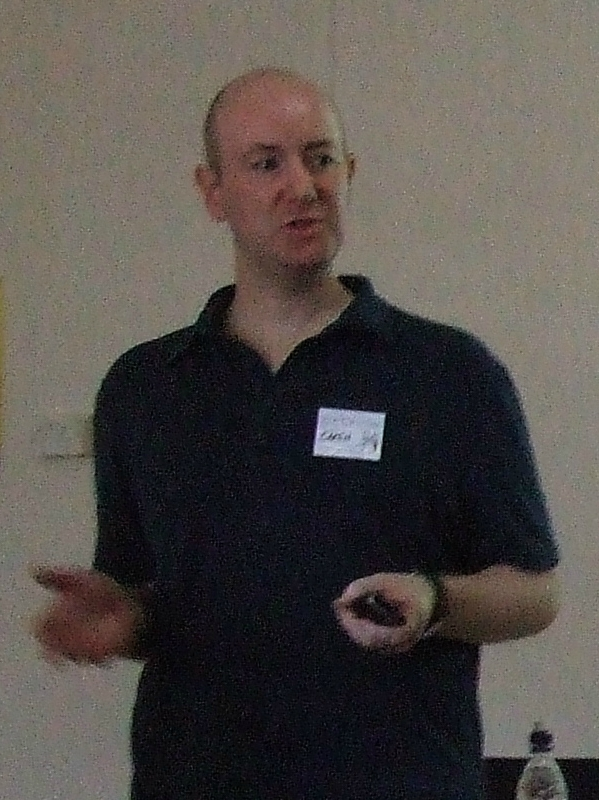
- Born: 1969 (age 56–57)
- Areas: Artist, writer
- Notable works: The Rainbow Orchid
- Awards: British Comic Awards (Young People’s Comic Award 2013)

Garen Ewing (born 1969 in England) is an illustrator, designer and most notably a comic creator, being the writer and illustrator of The Adventures of Julius Chancer - The Rainbow Orchid.

As an aside, Ewing is a part-time researcher and writer on the Second Anglo-Afghan War (1878–80) and was interviewed by Sue Cook on BBC Radio 4's 'Making History' programme in this capacity in October 2004.

== Biography ==
After self-publishing several fanzines, he started King Rat Press in 1988 with the anthology Cosmorama, which included contributors such as Steve Pugh, David Wyatt, Warren Ellis, Paul H. Birch, Ralph Horsley and Sara Russell. In 1994 he had his full length comic version of Shakespeare's The Tempest published, a copy of which resides at the Shakespeare Library, Stratford-upon-Avon. Since then, he has worked as an illustrator and designer.

His most well-known work, an example of the ligne claire comic form, is a mystery adventure, The Rainbow Orchid, which has received much critical acclaim, including two nominations for a National Comic Award (2004), and winning the 2013 Young People’s Comic Award (part of the British Comic Awards). The book is published in English by Egmont UK, in Dutch by Silvester Strips, in French by BD Must Editions, in Spanish by NetCom2 Editorial, in German by Salleck Publications, and in Danish by Tellerup.

He was one of the contributors to The DFC, the weekly kids' comic published by David Fickling Books, originally developing John Blake with Philip Pullman, then writing and drawing Charlie Jefferson and the Tomb of Nazaleod. For the DFC's successor, The Phoenix, he illustrated two Ben Haggarty stories, The Legend of the Golden Feather in issue 1, and The Bald Boy and the Dervish in issues 23 to 26, as well as writing and drawing The Secret of the Samurai, a 20-page Julius Chancer adventure. He was one of the artists featured in Dez Skinn's Comic Art Now: The Very Best in Contemporary Comic Art and Illustration (ILEX Press, 2008), and in February 2011, his poster design for Return to the Forbidden Planet was released as a stamp as part of Royal Mail's British Musicals set. He contributed the 2004 section to Blank Slate Books' Eisner Award nominated Nelson (2011) collaborative graphic novel.

From 2006 to 2017 Ewing provided all the cover artwork for Bafflegab Productions' series of audio plays, The Scarifyers, written by Simon Barnard and starring Nicholas Courtney, Terry Molloy and David Warner.

Arni’s Epic Adventures, a wordless comic strip about a little red bird (a Pine grosbeak), was broadcast in daily episodes throughout November 2015 across the UK. Commissioned by JCDecaux, it was the first comic strip to appear on public digital screens, and reached an estimated audience of 30-40 million people.

Ewing was the artist for the 2017 jungle-exploration Eurogame, The Lost Expedition, designed by Peer Sylvester and published by Osprey Games. He illustrated 80 cards for the game (which was based on Percy Fawcett’s search for the Lost City of Z), as well as providing the box art. The Lost Expedition has subsequently been translated into French, Polish, Italian, Spanish and Chinese. Ewing was also the artist for the 2018 expansion pack, The Lost Expedition: The Fountain of Youth & Other Adventures.

Ewing was the principal concept artist and illustrator for the expedition-simulation computer game, Curious Expedition 2 (no connection to The Lost Expedition), the sequel to Berlin-based games studio Maschinen Mensch’s 2016 roguelike hit, Curious Expedition. The game was released on Steam on 28 January 2021, and later for Nintendo Switch, Xbox, and PlayStation.

== Bibliography ==
=== Early work ===
Realm of the Sorceress, a fantasy/SF adventure that appeared in the fanzine Panemonium (1987–1991); The Tempest, a comic strip adaptation of the William Shakespeare play (1994); and Captain Powerchord, a humorous music-based strip that appeared in the local entertainment guide 5D (1993–1994, collected in 1996). Ewing has also contributed comics and illustrations to a wide variety of titles, including the Accent UK anthologies, Solar Wind and the Feed America's Children charity comic to name just a few.

=== The Rainbow Orchid Universe ===
The Rainbow Orchid

Ewing's main work, an adventure story set in the 1920s. An expedition sets off to northern India to find the mystical Rainbow Orchid, and save the sword of Tybalt Stone from falling into the hands of Urkaz Grope.

The Girdle of Polly Hipple

A Rainbow Orchid spin-off for Accent UK's Twelve. The anthology was based upon the twelve Labours of Hercules, and Ewing's work is based on the ninth task; the Girdle of Hippolyte. In the story, the reporter William Pickle gets his first big break by wheedling his way into getting a photo of a rare ancient Egyptian artefact.

The Sword of Truth

A Rainbow Orchid spin-off for Factor Fiction's The Girly Comic, which works as an origin story for the character of Lily Lawrence as she performs at a London theatre, where two young men compete for her attentions. This story was translated into Dutch in 2010 and appeared in the comics magazine, Stripschrift.

The Secret of the Samurai

A Julius Chancer adventure set a couple of years before the events in The Rainbow Orchid, featuring the search for a lost set of samurai armour in 1920s England. Serialised in The Phoenix in 2013 and published in French, German, Dutch, Spanish and English in 2020.

The Brambletye Box

Set immediately after The Rainbow Orchid, a preview appeared online in May 2022, followed by a printed preview edition (vol. 0.5) in January 2026. The story relates to a real local ruin, Brambletye House, about which Garen was interviewed for the BBC's Secret Sussex.
