= The DFC =

British story comics for children

- Cover of the first issue

Publication information
- Publisher: David Fickling Books
- Schedule: Weekly
- Format: Comics anthology
- Publication date: May 2008 to March 2009
- No. of issues: 43

The DFC was a weekly British children's anthology comic, published by David Fickling Books (an imprint of Random House). The first issue was published at the end of May 2008. The title stood for "David Fickling Comic". Its successor, The Phoenix, launched on 7 January 2012.

Unlike the vast majority of comics in the current market, The DFC was funded entirely by subscriptions, without any commercial advertising. It was fully coloured on all 36 pages.

== Publication history ==
David Fickling announced the comic two and a half years before the launch and at the time was quoted as saying, "I'm not really interested in reviving comics, I'm much more interested in restoring them to where they should be."

Some stories were previewed in, and formed the main part of, The Guardian Comic. The comic, part of the Saturday Guardian's "family" section, premiered strips on a rotating basis that were later featured in The DFC itself.

It folded with issue 43, when Random House decided that "economic conditions ... were too tough for a slow build".

At the 2009 Frankfurt Book Fair, David Fickling Books announced a new imprint, The DFC Library, to publish collected editions of strips from The DFC. The first titles published were Kate Brown's Spider Moon, Dave Shelton's Good Dog, Bad Dog, and Ben Haggarty and Adam Brockbank's Mezolith in Spring 2010. Neill Cameron's Mo-Bot High, The Etherington Brothers' Monkey Nuts: The Diamond Egg of Wonders and Sarah McIntyre's Vern and Lettuce followed in Winter 2010, with John and Patrice Aggs' The Boss, James Turner's Super Animal Adventure Squad, and The Etherington Brothers Baggage, an original graphic novel that had not previously been serialised in The DFC, completing the lineup in 2011.

== Creators ==
The DFC drew its creators from across the British comics field, from mainstream to small press to webcomics to manga, as well as people from outside the field, including authors, concept artists and illustrators.

The big name in the initial line-up was novelist Philip Pullman. Pullman's story, The Adventures of John Blake, was illustrated by John Aggs, who won the UK and Ireland Rising Stars of Manga and writes and draws another DFC strip, Robot Girl and another with his mother, Patrice.

Other creators included Nick Abadzis who has worked at Marvel, DC and 2000 AD and recently won awards for his graphic novel Laika. International comics writer Tony Lee, best known for his Doctor Who comics for IDW teamed up with Hope Falls and The Gloom collaborator Dan Boultwood to create the weekly strip The Prince Of Baghdad. Another graphic novelist was Simone Lia, known for her previous project Fluffy. With them were writers and artists who are known from the small press to webcomic arena, like Garen Ewing and Neill Cameron. From outside the comics field there were Ben Haggarty (an oral storyteller), Adam Brockbank (concept artist), Paul Stewart (children's author), Dave Morris (game designer) and Chris Riddell (illustrator).

== Name ==
The initialism "DFC" was never explained inside the actual comic, and readers were encouraged to send in amusing phrases formed from the three letters, which were then displayed on the front cover. Examples of this are: "Dirty Fingernail Contest", "Delighted Football Crowd", "Dachshund Flips Coin", et cetera.

== Titles ==
Strips appearing in the DFC included:

- The Adventures of John Blake (by Philip Pullman and John Aggs)
- Mezolith (by Ben Haggarty and Adam Brockbank)
- Mirabilis (by Dave Morris and Leo Hartas)
- Super Animal Adventure Squad (by James Turner)
- The Boss (by John Aggs and Patrice Aggs)
- Monkey Nuts (by The Etherington Brothers)
- Vern & Lettuce (by Sarah McIntyre)
- The Spider Moon (by Kate Brown)
- Mo-Bot High (by Neill Cameron)
- Good Dog, Bad Dog (by Dave Shelton)
- Robot Girl (by John Aggs)
- That's a Horse of a Different Colour (by Woodrow Phoenix)
- Sausage and Carrots (by Simone Lia)
- Crab Lane Crew (by Jim Medway)
- Violet (by Emma Vieceli)
- Little Cutie (by Gary Northfield)
- Bodkin and the Bear (by Wilbur Dawbarn)
- The Prince of Baghdad (by Tony Lee and Dan Boultwood)
- Fish-head Steve (by Jamie Smart)
- Donny Digits (by Woodrow Phoenix)
- Frontier (by Jason Cobley and Andrew Wildman)
- The Strange, Strange World of Weird (by Robin Etherington and Zak Simmonds-Hurn)

Strips that were announced (or those that ran initially in The Guardian, and were scheduled to appear in the DFC) include:

- Charlie Jefferson and the Tomb of Nazaleod (by Garen Ewing)
- Cora's Breakfast (by Nick Abadzis)
- The Ridiculous Adventures of Toxic Toad and Sheep Dip (By Gary Boller)
- Dead Pets' Society (by Faz Choudhury)

== Availability ==
Since the announcement by Random House that the DFC was to close, subscriptions are no longer available. The DFC was available from Amazon.co.uk, as a month's subscription.

== See also ==
- History of the British comic
