= Communist Party of Canada (Manitoba) candidates in the 2007 Manitoba provincial election =

The Communist Party of Canada - Manitoba fielded six candidates in the 2007 provincial election, none of whom were elected. Information about these candidates may be found on this page.

== Lisa Gallagher (Brandon West) ==
Gallagher is a member of the Waywayseecappo First Nation in Manitoba. She holds a General Studies degree from Brandon University and has worked in Manitoba, Alberta and British Columbia. She was a university student during her first campaign. Gallagher has been active in the peace movement, and has been involved in issues relating to Manitoba's aboriginal community. She has run three times for the Communist Party of Canada in federal elections and three times for its provincial affiliate.

In November 1999, Gallagher and other Brandon University students burned an American and a Canadian flag to protest what they described as Canada and America's hypocritical policies in relation to East Timor. She argued that it was inconsistent for Canada to send peacekeepers into the fledgling country after having supported Suharto's government in Indonesia for several decades. She later apologized to war veterans who took offense at her manner of protest and said that she would not likely repeat the act in the future.

A 2003 newspaper report listed her name as "Lisa Gallagher-Cloud."

Electoral record
Election	Division	Party	Votes	%	Place	Winner
1999 provincial	Brandon West	Communist	92	0.93	4/4	Scott Smith, New Democratic Party
2000 federal	Brandon—Souris	Communist	102	0.28	5/6	Rick Borotsik, Progressive Conservative
2003 provincial	Brandon East	Communist	58	0.93	4/4	Drew Caldwell, New Democratic Party
2004 federal	Brandon—Souris	Communist	118	0.34	6/6	Merv Tweed, Conservative
2006 federal	Brandon—Souris	Communist	120	0.32	7/7	Merv Tweed, Conservative
2007 provincial	Brandon West	Communist	43	0.44	4/4	Rick Borotsik, Progressive Conservative
