= Don Garcia (union organizer) =

Canadian union leader

- Born: Donald Peter Garcia; October 29, 1926; New Westminster, B.C., Canada
- Died: May 10, 1995 (aged 68); Vancouver, B.C., Canada

Donald (Don) Peter Garcia (October 29, 1926 – May 10, 1995) was a Filipino Canadian union organizer mostly noted as the past president of the International Longshore and Warehouse Union (ILWU) Canadian Area.

== Early life ==
Don Garcia was born to mixed Hawaiian/Filipino father Peter Nahanee Garcia and Squamish mother Sadie Clark in New Westminster, BC in 1926. His paternal grandfather José Garcia was one of the early Filipino settlers of Bowen Island and was a City of North Vancouver employee. He was raised in Surrey and belonged to a group of longshoring and Indigenous communities in the Pacific Northwest.

== ILWU years ==
Garcia started longshoring in New Westminster in 1947. In 1963, he was elected President of ILWU Local 502; three years later he was arrested, convicted and sentenced to three months in jail, along with nine other local presidents and then-Canadian Area President Roy Smith, for defying Canada's Supreme Court. Union members and officers remembered him as a "tough and skilled negotiator."

In 1970, Garcia was elected Canadian Area President; he held that post until 1978, and then from 1980 to 1984 and 1986–1991, when he retired. During his ILWU career he spearheaded numerous contract negotiations and strikes. He frequently butted heads with the British Columbia Maritime Employers' Association and the Canadian Parliament, which became notorious for legislating striking longshoremen back to work and, consequently, handicapping the union at the bargaining table. One such incident in 1972 resulted in 9 months of negotiations before the contract was finally settled.

During his tenure as Canadian Area President, Garcia served as a member of the ILWU International Executive Board, President of the Pacific Maritime Council, and delegate to the Canadian Labour Congress. In 1971, he became the only labor-member on the newly constituted Port of Vancouver Authority (now Vancouver Fraser Port Authority). In 1976, he led the ILWU delegation, as 25,000 Canadian workers converged on Ottawa to protest federal wage controls.

== Post ILWU career ==
From 1982 to 1991, he was second vice-president of the British Columbia Federation of Labour (BCFL). He was also a founding member of the BC Federation of Retired Union Members, a group of union retirees who lend their experience and wisdom to the labour movement and a founding member of Western Transportation Advisory Council (WESTAC).

As a labor organizer, he also traveled internationally in his leadership roles, building relationships and solidarity with longshore workers around the world. Many point to his part in expanding and solidifying the union's pension plan as a defining legacy. He finished his career in 1992 by negotiating one last local agreement, which came down close to midnight before his 65th birthday – the last possible day he could work, by law.

He died May 10, 1995, at age 68 after a two-year illness with cancer.

ILWU Titled Officers said in a joint statement:

His vision and guidance has helped the ILWU reach across the border to our Canadian sisters and brothers in our joint effort to expand and strengthen the union as a whole. His unwavering commitment to the advancement of workers has earned the respect and admiration of the ILWU International Officers past and present, and we shall be forever grateful, and just that much better for knowing him.

== See also ==
- History of Squamish and Tsleil-Waututh longshoremen, 1863–1963
