= Simone Lia =

English cartoonist and author

Simone Lia is an English cartoonist and author.

== Early life and education ==
Born to Maltese parents, Lia grew up in Haverhill, Suffolk.

She studied art in Ipswich, illustration at the University of Brighton, and did an MA in communication in art and design at the Royal College of Art.

== Works ==
She has created a number of children's books including Billy Bean's Dream, Follow the Line and Little Giant; and comics such as Golden Lions and Monkey and Spoon.

Her graphic novel Fluffy appeared in four self-published parts before being collected in one volume by Jonathan Cape in 2007. Fluffy is a baby rabbit who is being looked after by an anxious, single man called Michael Pulcino. Michael tries to make it clear to Fluffy that he is not his daddy, but Fluffy appears to be in denial.

She is also noted for her work with Tom Gauld, whom she met at the Royal College of Art. Together they self-published the comics First and Second, under their Cabanon Press. The two volumes were then published together by Bloomsbury Publishing in 2003, as Both.

She has drawn Sausage and Carrots for The DFC and Lucie for The Phoenix.

Lia also contributes The Simone Lia Cartoon for the New Review magazine of The Observer.

== Bibliography ==
- The Secret Time Machine and the Gherkin Switcheroo (Candlewick Press, 2020) ISBN 9781536211894
- They Didn't Teach THIS in Worm School! (Walker Books, 2017) ISBN 9781406373349
- Please God, Find Me a Husband! (Jonathan Cape, 2012) ISBN 9780224096225
- Fluffy (Jonathan Cape, 2009) ISBN 9780224089241
- Little Giant (Gullane Children's Books, 2004) ISBN 9781862337954
- Both (with Tom Gauld, Bloomsbury, 2003) ISBN 9780747569497
- Follow the Line (Mammoth, 2002) ISBN 9780749748586
- Billy Bean's Dream (Gullane Children's Books, 2000) ISBN 9781862332607
- Red's Great Chase (Egmont Books, 2000) ISBN 9780525462132
