= My Own Genie =

British comic strip

My Own Genie is a comic strip in the British comic The Dandy, first seen in issue # 3314 on 4 June 2005. It is drawn by artist Jamie Smart, the creator of Bear. It is about a schoolgirl named Lula who gets her own Genie, called Brian, after she accidentally releases him from a tin of marzipan. The first thing Lula wishes for is a huge cake; she then asks for her pet dog Clive to have the power of speech. The Genie - who looks like a small, floating, furry mammal in a purple robe and fez - is so grateful to Lula for setting him free that he grants her unlimited wishes. However, being a selfish girl, her wishes get ever more bizarre. Clive the dog's wishes are far more sensible than Lula's and mainly consists of dog biscuit-type wishes.

My Own Genie became an overnight success with readers of The Dandy and by issue # 3342 (17 December 2005) the characters graced the front cover for the first time. Despite the huge success of the strip (it regularly topped readers' polls), Jamie Smart decided to rest My Own Genie in order to concentrate on new characters (specifically, a Dandy revival of his older strip Space Raoul). To date the last regular appearance of My Own Genie was in issue # 3378 (26 August 2006), although the characters did re-appear in the 2007 Dandy Summer Special, 2008 Dandy Annual and several random issues of the revamped Dandy Xtreme in 2007/2008. The strip sometimes breaks the fourth wall, as in the 2008 Dandy Annual, when Lula's pet gremlin "Simon" ate the title box, leading to a reprimand by Lula.

As of issue # 3544, My Own Genie returned to The Dandy in reprints, starting from its original episode, first seen in 2005.

== Characters ==
Lula

Lula is a schoolgirl of around eight to ten years old, with blonde hair. She is the main protagonist of the series, and rescued Genie from a marzipan tin. She can be selfish, and is typically seen wearing a pink dress and an orange beanie hat. She does not seem to have any feet, except when in a sitting position. Lula is particularly fond of biscuits.

Clive

Clive is Lula's dog. In the first instalment of the comic strip, he gains the power of speech. He is always hungry and is typically seen wearing a green flying hat with matching goggles. He rarely wishes, but when he does, they're usually more sensible than Lula's,.

Brian the Genie

Genie is a small, floating animal of an unknown species who is typically seen wearing a red and orange robe with a matching Fez hat. Genie's name is revealed to be "Brian" in the first instalment, however, this fact is rarely mentioned. He rarely loses his temper as is constantly advising Lula against her more bizarre wishes. He's never wished to himself.
