= Kurt Dunder =

Kurt Dunder is a Danish comics series written and drawn by Frank Madsen. It was created in 1986.

== Concept ==
The series is about an adventurer, Kurt Dunder, who travels around the world, along with his friend Bill Milton and Attila the monkey, to solve strange mysteries and riddles. It is drawn in the ligne claire style and published by Eudor Comics. So far, two albums have been translated in English, namely Kurt Dunder in Tirol in 2000 and Kurt Dunder in Africa in 2015.

== Other media ==
In 2008, Catooz made Kurt Dunder in Africa available through Nokia's OVI-portal as 10 downloadable chapters. In 2015, Eudor Comics made Kurt Dunder in Africa available for Amazon Kindle (English edition).

== Short stories ==
1. Den månesyge Mumie (1993, published in the anthology Gale Streger no. 6. Written by Ingo Milton, laid out by Frank Madsen and drawn by Sussi Bech. 6 pages.)
2. Kurt Dunder & Nanobotterne (2002–03, published in the comics magazine Kurt Dunder & Kompagni)
3. Kurt Dunder & Nazi-guldet (2008, Eudor Comics. 24 pages.)
4. Kurt Dunder i Alaska (2010, published in the newspaper Nya Upplagan. Story by Peter Becher. 4 pages.)

== Full stories ==
1. Kurt Dunder i Afrika (1991, Carlsen Comics)
2. Kurt Dunder i Grønland (1994, Carlsen Comics)
3. Kurt Dunder i Tyrol (2000, Carlsen Comics)
