= Leonard Evans =

Canadian politician (1929–2016)

Len Evans

Member of the Legislative Assembly of Manitoba for Brandon East
- In office June 25, 1969 – September 21, 1999
- Preceded by: Riding re-established
- Succeeded by: Drew Caldwell

Personal details
- Born: Leonard Salusbury Evans; August 19, 1929 Winnipeg, Manitoba
- Died: January 2, 2016 (aged 86) Winnipeg, Manitoba
- Party: New Democratic Party of Manitoba
- Spouse: Alice Lorrain Mazinke (m. 1953; died 2015)
- Education: University of Winnipeg University of Manitoba Simon Fraser University University of Ottawa

Leonard Salusbury Evans (August 19, 1929 – January 2, 2016) was a Canadian politician in Manitoba. He was a member of the Manitoba legislature from 1969 to 1999 and was a Cabinet Minister in the governments of New Democratic Premiers Edward Schreyer and Howard Pawley.

== Early life and career ==
The son of David Evans and Gwen Salusbury, he was born in Winnipeg and educated at Transcona Collegiate Institute, the University of Winnipeg, the University of Manitoba, Simon Fraser University and the University of Ottawa. He worked as an economist and a professor of economics before entering political life. Evans first ran for public office in the Canadian federal election of 1953, running as a Cooperative Commonwealth Federation candidate in the riding of St. Boniface. He finished second with 5,568 votes, a credible showing for the party in the region.

In 1953, he married Alice Lorrain Mazinke.

== Political career ==
Evans was elected to the Manitoba legislature as a New Democrat in the provincial election of 1969. This election was a watershed moment in Manitoba politics, as the NDP emerged as the largest party with 28 seats and formed government after gaining the support of Liberal MLA Laurent Desjardins. Evans was elected in the riding of Brandon East, in the province's southwestern corner.

Evans was named Minister of Mines and Natural Resources on July 15, 1969. On December 18 of the same year, he was promoted to Minister of Industry and Commerce, a position which he held until the defeat of the NDP government in 1977. He was also given ministerial responsibility for the Manitoba Housing and Renewal Corporation on September 22, 1976. Evans oversaw the Manitoba Development Corporation in his ministerial role and used his position to promote public management within certain industries. Additionally, he co-founded WESTAC to strengthen public-private relations in the transportation industry.

Evans was easily re-elected in the 1973 provincial election. He faced a more serious challenge from Progressive Conservative James Thornborough in the 1977 election but still won by over 1,000 votes. The Tories won the 1977 election, and Evans served as opposition critic for Economic Development over the next four years.

The NDP were returned to government in 1981, and Evans was appointed as Minister of Community Service and Correction and Minister of Natural Resources on November 30, 1981, also receiving responsibility for the Manitoba Telephone System. He was relieved of the latter two positions on August 20, 1982, and on November 4, 1983, was transferred to the Ministry of Employment Services and Economic Security, where he would remain until the fall of the NDP government in 1988. He was also given responsibility for the A.E. McKenzie Co. Ltd from June 29, 1983, to January 4, 1984, was Minister of Natural Resources again from January 3, 1986, to April 17, 1988, and held responsibility for Manitoba Data Services between September 21, 1987, and May 9, 1988.

Evans faced a surprisingly strong challenge from PC candidate Jim Armstrong in the 1986 provincial election but was re-elected by about 1,000 votes. He again defeated Armstrong by 653 votes in 1988, despite a sharp decline in NDP support in the rest of the province.

Prior to the fall of the NDP government in 1988, Evans went on record as being one of the few MLAs in his party to oppose the Meech Lake Accord. He wanted to join with Elijah Harper in denying approval for the Accord in 1990 but declined so as not to detract from the issue of aboriginal rights (Harper was aboriginal, Evans was not). As a cabinet minister, Evans stopped the process of adopting aboriginal children to non-aboriginal families outside of the province, a process which many aboriginal activists had regarded as cultural genocide.

Evans served as NDP Finance critic from 1988 to 1999. By now a respected "elder statesman" in the party, he had little difficulty being re-elected in the elections of 1990 and 1995. He did not seek re-election in the 1999 Manitoba general election; Drew Caldwell retained Brandon East for the NDP. As of July 2010, he was a member of the province's Public Utilities Board.

In 2007, Evans was elected as president of the Association of Former Manitoba MLAs. He died on January 2, 2016, at the age of 86 after suffering a heart attack in the previous week.

== Electoral record ==
1995 Manitoba general election: Brandon East
| Party | Candidate | Votes | % | Expenditures |
|---|---|---|---|---|
| New Democratic | Leonard Evans | 4,395 | 53.78 | $19,174.00 |
| Progressive Conservative | Greg Dinsdale | 2,608 | 31.91 | $15,909.63 |
| Liberal | Elizabeth Roberts | 1,169 | 14.30 | $14,378.67 |
| Total valid votes | | 8,172 | 100.00 | |
| Rejected and declined ballots | | 26 | | |
| Turnout | | 8,198 | 62.88 | |
| Electors on the lists | | 13,037 | | |

1990 Manitoba general election: Brandon East
| Party | Candidate | Votes | % | ±% |
|---|---|---|---|---|
| New Democratic | Leonard Evans | 4,760 | 53.51 | 13.78 |
| Progressive Conservative | Ron Arnst | 3,216 | 36.16 | 3.81 |
| Liberal | Brenda Avionitis | 919 | 10.33 | -15.24 |
| Total valid votes | | 8,895 | – | – |
| Rejected | | 38 | – | |
| Eligible voters / Turnout | | 13,230 | 67.52 | -7.85 |
Source(s) Source: Manitoba. Chief Electoral Officer (1999). Statement of Votes for the 37th Provincial General Election, September 21, 1999 (PDF) (Report). Winnipeg: Elections Manitoba.

1988 Manitoba general election: Brandon East
| Party | Candidate | Votes | % | ±% |
|---|---|---|---|---|
| New Democratic | Leonard Evans | 3,512 | 39.73 | -13.14 |
| Progressive Conservative | Jim Armstrong | 2,859 | 32.35 | -8.00 |
| Liberal | Lois Fjeldsted | 2,260 | 25.57 | 18.79 |
| Independent | Garth Shurvell | 208 | 2.35 | – |
| Total valid votes | | 8,839 | – | – |
| Rejected | | 16 | – | |
| Eligible voters / Turnout | | 11,749 | 75.37 | 8.35 |
Source(s) Source: Manitoba. Chief Electoral Officer (1999). Statement of Votes for the 37th Provincial General Election, September 21, 1999 (PDF) (Report). Winnipeg: Elections Manitoba.

1986 Manitoba general election: Brandon East
| Party | Candidate | Votes | % | ±% |
|---|---|---|---|---|
| New Democratic | Leonard Evans | 4,173 | 52.88 | -8.28 |
| Progressive Conservative | Jim Armstrong | 3,184 | 40.34 | 7.84 |
| Liberal | Eileen May McFadden | 535 | 6.78 | 0.44 |
| Total valid votes | | 7,892 | – | – |
| Rejected | | 20 | – | |
| Eligible voters / Turnout | | 11,806 | 67.02 | -3.42 |
Source(s) Source: Manitoba. Chief Electoral Officer (1999). Statement of Votes for the 37th Provincial General Election, September 21, 1999 (PDF) (Report). Winnipeg: Elections Manitoba.

1981 Manitoba general election: Brandon East
| Party | Candidate | Votes | % | ±% |
|---|---|---|---|---|
| New Democratic | Leonard Evans | 4,941 | 61.16 | 8.25 |
| Progressive Conservative | Garry Nowazek | 2,626 | 32.50 | -7.58 |
| Liberal | Margaret Workman | 512 | 6.34 | -0.66 |
| Total valid votes | | 8,079 | – | – |
| Rejected | | 40 | – | |
| Eligible voters / Turnout | | 11,527 | 70.43 | -1.82 |
Source(s) Source: Manitoba. Chief Electoral Officer (1999). Statement of Votes for the 37th Provincial General Election, September 21, 1999 (PDF) (Report). Winnipeg: Elections Manitoba.

1977 Manitoba general election: Brandon East
| Party | Candidate | Votes | % | ±% |
|---|---|---|---|---|
| New Democratic | Leonard Evans | 4,217 | 52.91 | 1.17 |
| Progressive Conservative | James Thornborough | 3,195 | 40.09 | 3.54 |
| Liberal | James Manishen | 558 | 7.00 | -3.73 |
| Total valid votes | | 7,970 | – | – |
| Rejected | | 16 | – | |
| Eligible voters / Turnout | | 11,052 | 72.26 | -0.37 |
Source(s) Source: Manitoba. Chief Electoral Officer (1999). Statement of Votes for the 37th Provincial General Election, September 21, 1999 (PDF) (Report). Winnipeg: Elections Manitoba.

1973 Manitoba general election: Brandon East
| Party | Candidate | Votes | % | ±% |
|---|---|---|---|---|
| New Democratic | Leonard Evans | 4,123 | 51.74 | 2.72 |
| Progressive Conservative | Kenneth John Burgess | 2,912 | 36.55 | 4.86 |
| Liberal | Terence "Terry" Penton | 855 | 10.73 | -8.56 |
| Social Credit | John William Gross | 78 | 0.98 | – |
| Total valid votes | | 7,968 | – | – |
| Rejected | | 48 | – | |
| Eligible voters / Turnout | | 11,037 | 72.63 | 10.81 |
Source(s) Source: Manitoba. Chief Electoral Officer (1999). Statement of Votes for the 37th Provincial General Election, September 21, 1999 (PDF) (Report). Winnipeg: Elections Manitoba.

1969 Manitoba general election: Brandon East
| Party | Candidate | Votes | % | ±% |
|---|---|---|---|---|
| New Democratic | Leonard Evans | 3,035 | 49.02 | – |
| Progressive Conservative | Emily Lyons | 1,962 | 31.69 | – |
| Liberal | Don Martin | 1,194 | 19.29 | – |
| Total valid votes | | 6,191 | – | – |
| Rejected | | 34 | – | |
| Eligible voters / Turnout | | 10,069 | 61.82 | – |
Source(s) Source: Manitoba. Chief Electoral Officer (1999). Statement of Votes for the 37th Provincial General Election, September 21, 1999 (PDF) (Report). Winnipeg: Elections Manitoba.

=== Federal ===
1953 Canadian federal election: Saint Boniface—Saint Vital
| Party | Candidate | Votes | % | ±% |
|---|---|---|---|---|
| Liberal | Fernand Viau | 8,051 | 43.3 | -14.1 |
| Co-operative Commonwealth | Leonard S. Evans | 5,568 | 29.9 | +0.9 |
| Progressive Conservative | George Campbell MacLean | 4,994 | 26.8 | +13.2 |
| Total valid votes | | 18,613 | 100.0 | |
