= Drew Caldwell =

Canadian politician

Manitoba Minister of Family Services and Housing
- In office September 25, 2002 – November 4, 2003
- Premier: Gary Doer
- Preceded by: Tim Sale
- Succeeded by: Christine Melnick

Manitoba Minister of Education, Training and Youth
- In office January 17, 2001 – September 25, 2002
- Premier: Gary Doer
- Preceded by: new portfolio
- Succeeded by: portfolio abolished

Manitoba Minister of Education and Training
- In office October 5, 1999 – January 17, 2001
- Premier: Gary Doer
- Preceded by: James McCrae
- Succeeded by: portfolio abolished

Member of the Legislative Assembly of Manitoba for Brandon East
- In office September 21, 1999 – April 19, 2016
- Preceded by: Leonard Evans
- Succeeded by: Len Isleifson

Member of the Brandon City Council for Rosser
- In office 1992–1999
- Preceded by: James Harwood
- Succeeded by: Marion Robinsong

Personal details
- Born: April 10, 1960 (age 66) Brandon, Manitoba
- Party: New Democratic Party
- Education: Brandon University (BA); Queen's University (BEd); McGill University

Drew Caldwell (born April 10, 1960) is a politician in Manitoba, Canada. He was a member of the Legislative Assembly of Manitoba for the constituency of Brandon East from 1999 until 2016, serving as a Cabinet Minister in the governments of Gary Doer and Greg Selinger. Caldwell is a member of the New Democratic Party.

== Early life and career ==
Caldwell was born and raised in Brandon, Manitoba. He holds a Bachelor of Arts degree from Brandon University (1982), a Bachelor of Education degree from Queen's University in Kingston (1983), and undertook graduate studies in history at McGill University in Montreal. He returned to Brandon permanently on the passing of his father in 1989, working as a supply teacher and managing the Brandon Career Symposium. He was active with community organizations such as the Park Community Centre and was a founding director of the Brandon Folk Music and Art Festival and the Art Gallery of Southwestern Manitoba.

Caldwell was a member of the Brandon City Council from 1992 to 1999, representing the Rosser Ward (Ward Two). He was a founding director of the Brandon Regional Health Authority, and - on the provincial stage - an Executive Member of the Union of Manitoba Municipalities, the Manitoba Association of Urban Municipalities and the Association of Manitoba Municipalities between 1997 and 1999. He opposed residential property tax increases while on city council, and supported owners of single-family homes in calling for parts of the city to be re-zoned from high-density residential to low-density residential. In 1998, he chaired the Brandon Poverty Forum which led to the establishment of the Brandon Social Planning Council and a $50,000 civic reserve fund for social development.

Active in the Manitoba NDP since his teens, Caldwell was President of the party when the writ was dropped for the 1999 General Election.

== Member of the Legislative Assembly ==
When longtime Brandon East MLA Len Evans announced his retirement in 1999, Caldwell defeated Ross Martin and Susan Ferron to win the riding's NDP nomination. He was elected without difficulty in the general election that followed, as the NDP won a provincial majority government under Gary Doer.

=== Minister of Education and Training ===
Caldwell was respected for his political/administrative skills, and there was little surprise when he was appointed to cabinet as Minister of Education and Training on October 5, 1999. The position gave him oversight of the province's public schools and post-secondary institutions. His position was renamed as Minister of Education, Training and Youth in 2001, and his responsibilities for post-secondary institutions were transferred to Diane McGifford, the Minister of Advanced Education and Training.

==== Early initiatives ====
Soon after his appointment, Caldwell implemented an NDP campaign pledge to replace standardized Grade Three language and mathematics exams with individual diagnostic tests administered by teachers. Many teachers complained about the extra workload, and opposition critic Joy Smith argued that the test system should be restored. Caldwell responded that individual assessments were better suited to students' needs.

Caldwell also removed the controversial Youth News Network from Manitoba schools. The network's parent company, Athena Education Partners, had previously offered free technology to schools in return for requiring students to watch daily YNN broadcasts, which included commercials from private corporations. According to Todd Scarth of the Canadian Centre for Policy Alternatives, YNN televisions were equipped with two-way monitoring systems to ensure that students were watching and that the volume was not adjusted. Athena's contracts also required schools to hire a half-day technician to maintain YNN equipment. Caldwell described YNN's programming as "clearly an unsatisfactory curriculum choice" for children, and oversaw the program's elimination once previously signed contracts were concluded in August 2000. The network was also banned in other provinces, and went off the air in 2000.

==== School funding ====
When he assumed office, Caldwell indicated that school board funding increases would be pegged relative to provincial economic growth. In February 2000, he announced that his government would provide schools with a 2.8% funding increase over the previous academic year. The Winnipeg One division saw its funding increase by $4.1 million, primarily due to a large number of students in special education. Caldwell announced another 2.8% in 2001, and a 2.2% increase in 2002. The latter amount was smaller than in previous years, but higher than overall provincial growth.

Despite these increases, school trustees repeatedly warned the public that boards would be required to either raise taxes or cut back on services. Caldwell acknowledged that the funding increases did not address all divisional needs, and blamed low levels of funding during the previous decade of Progressive Conservative government. He also suggested that some trustees were overpaid, noting that St. Vital trustees had voted to give themselves stipends of $300 per day to attend amalgamation meetings.

==== Amalgamations ====
Shortly after assuming office, Caldwell told his department to review the Norrie Commission findings on school boards and prepare a report on amalgamations. He indicated that his intent was to save money on administration, and put more funds directly into the classrooms. Caldwell called for voluntary board mergers in 2000, saying that school divisions would need at least two thousand students to be viable and that more than half the provincial divisions were below that level.

The response from school boards was tepid, and Caldwell announced in late 2001 that he would reduce the number of provincial boards from 54 to 36. Three boards in Winnipeg were forced to merge. A bill enacting these changes was passed in July 2002, and the new school division boundaries were in place for the 2002 municipal elections. The most difficult change was in Transcona-Springfield, which was split and merged with two pre-existing districts.

During the amalgamation dispute, Caldwell introduced legislation requiring merged districts to submit their budgets to the minister for approval. He argued that this was necessary to prevent large property tax increases. He also agreed to pay $50 per student to divisions that he forced into amalgamation, to compensate for the difficulties of restructuring.

==== Adult education ====
Caldwell was forced to cut per-student funding for adult education in 2000, after an unexpected surge in enrollment from the previous year put his department $10 million over budget. He later argued that some adult education programs had been inadequately managed during the previous administration, and expressed concern about the quality of education that adult students were receiving. His ministry discovered questionable recruitment practices in the Morris-Macdonald School Division, where cash bonuses had been paid to administrators who brought in thousands of adult students from elsewhere in the province. Caldwell ordered his department to investigate the matter, which he described as "clearly inappropriate".

An October 2001 report from provincial auditor Jon Singleton found that the Morris-Macdonald board had offered courses of dubious quality, and had overbilled the province by as much as four million dollars by claiming students who were not actually enrolled. Caldwell dissolved the board the following month, and authorized the Royal Canadian Mounted Police to launch a criminal investigation. The RCMP later found that there was insufficient evidence to warrant criminal charges. Caldwell said of the matter, "The absolute abrogation of responsibility that took place among these officials is appalling. There may well have to be some systemic change with respect to school board financial responsibility." He introduced new legislation in May 2002.

A government-appointed overseer increased Morris-Macdonald school taxes by 28% in 2002, largely to recover funds that were lost by virtue of the previous controversy. Local residents responded by launching a legal challenge against the overseer and the government. Caldwell indicated that he was willing to cushion the tax burden by allowing new trustees a longer period of time to pay off the debt.

Jon Singleton later discovered that a second school board, the Agassiz Division, had received funding for non-existent adult students in 2001 with the Department of Education's knowledge and approval. The Department had provided an additional $450,000 to the cash-strapped board as general revenue, and flowed it through the adult education program for administrative purposes. Caldwell acknowledged that his department had made a "foolish mistake" in allowing the transfer, but insisted that it was done to protect students from the consequences of a drastic budget cut. He added that the Agassiz and Morris-Macdonald situations were completely different, and rejected calls from the opposition for his resignation. The Deputy Attorney General investigated the matter and concluded that the transaction was inappropriate, but not fraudulent.

==== Labour relations ====
Following his appointment to cabinet, Caldwell indicated that he would reverse the previous government's changes to the Public Schools Act relating to arbitration for teachers' salaries. The system in place when he assumed office stipulated that contract disputes must be settled according to the division's ability to pay. Caldwell initially considered reforming the system by putting teachers' contracts under the Labour Relations Act, so as to allow a greater range of issues to be considered. He refused to introduce the option of strikes and lockouts, which neither side had requested. The Manitoba Teachers' Society generally supported the proposed changes, while the Manitoba Association of School Trustees opposed them.

Caldwell's June 2000 legislation expanded the range of arbitrable issues, but did not put teacher contracts under the Labour Relations Act. The reforms did not initially allow teachers to take class size and class composition to arbitration, although the government later exercised a clause in the bill to permit this right.

==== Property taxes ====
When campaigning for election in 1999, Gary Doer pledged that his party would move to phase out the Education Support Levy on property taxes by its third year in office, unless such a move would jeopardize health or education services. An April 2001 report by the Association of Manitoba Municipalities subsequently proposed a significant education tax shift from property taxes to general revenue. Caldwell announced later in the year that his government would begin phasing out the levy for homeowners, and would attempt to remove it entirely in five years.

Caldwell also introduced a revised funding formula for Manitoba schools in early 2002, simplifying some aspects of a model that was often criticized for its byzantine complexity. Some argued that the changes did not go far enough.

==== School curriculum ====
In 2001, Caldwell introduced a program to allow greater freedom for high-school students and teachers in designing their curriculum. Under his proposals, students would be allowed to earn optional credits through non-traditional means, such as taking part in science projects or performing community service. Some argued that these changes would devalue the quality of Manitoba education, but Caldwell insisted that the new credit courses would be thoroughly vetted and would incorporate traditional subjects. The proposal was revised in 2002; credits for volunteer work were allowed, but extracurricular activity credits were dropped after opposition from educators.

==== Universities ====
Caldwell fulfilled an NDP pledge for a tuition freeze and a 10% student tuition rebate shortly after assuming office. Both policies won support from the Canadian Centre for Policy Alternatives.

The Doer government's first budget, in May 2000, included $60 million of new money for Manitoba's community college system, and a 3.8% increase for university funding. Although senior educators acknowledged that Caldwell's spending increases were a step in the right direction, many described the funds as insufficient. The University of Manitoba announced that it would need to introduce significant cuts in the wake of the budget, although Caldwell argued that university management practices were responsible for the institution's shortfalls. Brandon University officials described the budget as their "most optimistic" in years.

In November 2000, the Doer government introduced $50 million over five years to repair the University of Manitoba's crumbling infrastructure.

Caldwell ceded cabinet responsibility for universities to Diane McGifford in 2001. The Winnipeg Free Press newspaper suggested that he had been "carrying too much responsibility" and "accomplishing too little" in his original ministerial duties, and noted that he was more familiar with the public education file.

==== Other ====
In 2001, Caldwell announced that Manitoba would open high schools in Beijing, Shanghai and Bangkok in an effort to attract overseas students to Manitoba's post-secondary education system.

In the same year, members of People for the Ethical Treatment of Animals announced that they would distribute trading cards to children outside Manitoba schools as part of a national anti-milk campaign. The cards showed the unhealthy side effects which PETA members suggested were associated with milk, including an increased risk of cancer and heart disease. Caldwell refused to allow PETA members on school property, and announced that he would take "appropriate legal steps" if they "entice[d] children into approaching [them] for materials".

Caldwell indicated in late April 2002 that his government would focus infrastructural funds on repairing existing schools, rather than constructing new ones.

==== Other responsibilities ====
Caldwell was appointed to a super-committee of cabinet, called the Community Economic Development Committee, in late March 2000. In August of the same year, he was appointed to the Manitoba Round Table for Sustainable Development by Conservation Minister Oscar Lathlin.

Diane McGifford took Caldwell's seat on the Community Economic Development Committee in March 2001, as the position required the presence of a minister overseeing universities and community colleges.

=== Minister of Family Services and Housing ===
Following a cabinet shuffle on September 25, 2002, Caldwell was named Minister of Family Services and Housing with responsibility for Persons with Disabilities. The Family Services Ministry was being restructured at the time of Caldwell's appointment, and he was given responsibility for overseeing the transformation.

==== Family Services ====
In November 2002, Caldwell announced that his government would establish a residential treatment centre to provide care and counselling to sexually exploited children. He also announced a review of Winnipeg Child and Family Services's temporary shelters after a series of complaints, and worked to ensure that play therapy services for children would be retained.

In February 2003, Caldwell received a report into the circumstances of a child who had been shaken to death seven years earlier while under the supervision of Winnipeg Child and Family Services. He responded by announcing an overhaul of the child welfare system, and indicated that Manitoba would set workload standards for social workers and supervisors.

Caldwell also announced his support for a national day-care program negotiated between the provinces and federal government in early 2003, and pledged that his government would create 788 new day-care spaces across the province in the following year.

In September 2003, Caldwell and Manitoba Métis Federation leader David Chartrand signed a mandate to create the Métis Child, Family and Community Services Agency, and to give the agency control over child welfare services for Métis residents. This step followed a recommendation by the Aboriginal Justice Inquiry ten years earlier, that First Nations in Canada be given authority for raising their children in the child welfare system.

==== Housing ====
Caldwell announced a $3.3 million housing announcement for Winnipeg in October 2002, in conjunction with Mayor Glen Murray and Member of Parliament Anita Neville. Soon after, he helped introduce a solar panel heating project to reduce downtown Winnipeg's fuel consumption.

Caldwell acknowledged that the housing situation in Manitoba was difficult, and expressed hope that his government would be able to create up to 2,500 units of affordable housing in five years. In April 2003, he recommended tax credits for the construction of rental housing. He later helped launch an affordable-housing project in north-end Winnipeg with members of the municipal and federal governments.

=== Government backbencher ===
Caldwell was re-elected in the 2003 provincial election, winning an easy victory over his Progressive Conservative opponent. He was originally retained as Family Services and Housing Minister, but left cabinet on November 4, 2003. He had been suffering from respiratory difficulties for some time, and Doer indicated he requested to be removed due to health concerns. Others have argued Doer was dissatisfied with Caldwell and have suggested that the latter's health concerns, while legitimate, provided cover for a dismissal.

Caldwell served as a government backbencher after leaving cabinet. He became a staunch advocate for the relocation of Assiniboine Community College to the former BMHC site on Brandon's north hill, an initiative commenced during his tenure as Minister of Education. Caldwell also assumed leadership roles in local advocacy for development of the Western Manitoba Cancer Treatment Centre, provincial investment in flood protection for the City of Brandon, Brandon University, the Keystone Centre, the Provincial Exhibition of Manitoba and the hosting of the Memorial Cup. He also criticized some of his government's decisions, challenging Health Minister Theresa Oswald over details of the decision to spray malathion to control mosquito populations. He was re-elected in the 2007 provincial election, as the Doer government was returned with a third consecutive majority. With the NDP loss of the Brandon West constituency, Caldwell was left as the only New Democratic government MLA in Western Manitoba. There was some speculation that Caldwell would be re-appointed to cabinet in the next shuffle, but this did not occur. Instead, in February 2008, he was appointed as Legislative Assistant to the Premier with special responsibility for western Manitoba. Caldwell was re-elected in the 2011 provincial election with an increased plurality, and remained the sole New Democratic government MLA in Western Manitoba.

=== Minister for Municipal Government ===
Caldwell returned to cabinet as Minister for Municipal Government in November 2014. His responsibilities included administration of the Building Manitoba/Building Canada Fund, the development of alternative energy policy, and municipal government relations with specific responsibility for the City of Winnipeg. Notable initiatives undertaken during this time included the Waverly Underpass. Caldwell also served on Treasury Board in his capacity as Minister.

=== Federal politics ===
Caldwell supported Jack Layton for the federal New Democratic Party leadership in 2002-03. He supported Tom Mulcair in the 2012 leadership race to succeed Mr. Layton.

== Electoral record ==
2016 Manitoba general election: Brandon East
Party	Candidate	Votes	%	±%	Expenditures
Progressive Conservative	Len Isleifson	3,669	52.17	13.62	$36,772.89
New Democratic	Drew Caldwell	2,534	36.03	-18.92	$12,132.70
Liberal	Vanessa Hamilton	830	11.80	7.82	$2,810.27
Total valid votes		7,033	–	–	
Rejected		117	–		
Eligible voters / turnout		13,120	54.50	1.38	
Source(s) Source: Manitoba. Chief Electoral Officer (2016). Statement of Votes for the 41st Provincial General Election, April 19, 2016 (PDF) (Report). Winnipeg: Elections Manitoba. "Election Returns: 41st General Election". Elections Manitoba. 2016.

2011 Manitoba general election: Brandon East
Party	Candidate	Votes	%	±%	Expenditures
New Democratic	Drew Caldwell	3,864	54.95	1.00	$14,503.88
Progressive Conservative	Mike Waddell	2,711	38.55	0.46	$26,300.48
Liberal	Shaun Cameron	280	3.98	-3.97	$1,479.21
Green	Vanda Fleury	177	2.52	–	$0.00
Total valid votes		7,032	–	–	
Rejected		35	–		
Eligible voters / turnout		13,305	53.12	-5.60	
Source(s) Source: Manitoba. Chief Electoral Officer (2011). Statement of Votes for the 40th Provincial General Election, October 4, 2011 (PDF) (Report). Winnipeg: Elections Manitoba. "Election Returns: 40th General Election". Elections Manitoba. 2011.

2007 Manitoba general election: Brandon East
Party	Candidate	Votes	%	±%	Expenditures
New Democratic	Drew Caldwell	3,760	53.95	-8.09	$19,216.70
Progressive Conservative	Mike Waddell	2,655	38.10	5.46	$26,503.06
Liberal	Cheryl Burke	554	7.95	3.56	$5,462.24
Total valid votes		6,969	–	–	
Rejected		31	–		
Eligible voters / turnout		11,921	58.72	6.06	
Source(s) Source: Manitoba. Chief Electoral Officer (2007). Statement of Votes for the 39th Provincial General Election, May 22, 2007 (PDF) (Report). Winnipeg: Elections Manitoba.

2003 Manitoba general election: Brandon East
Party	Candidate	Votes	%	±%	Expenditures
New Democratic	Drew Caldwell	3,870	62.04	0.76	$14,549.00
Progressive Conservative	Greg Dinsdale	2,036	32.64	6.30	$13,316.52
Liberal	Scott Brigden	274	4.39	-1.34	$1,771.36
Communist	Lisa Gallagher	58	0.93	–	$436.91
Total valid votes		6,238	–	–	
Rejected		26	–		
Eligible voters / turnout		11,895	52.66	-11.69	
Source(s) Source: Manitoba. Chief Electoral Officer (2003). Statement of Votes for the 38th Provincial General Election, June 3, 2003 (PDF) (Report). Winnipeg: Elections Manitoba.

1999 Manitoba general election: Brandon East
Party	Candidate	Votes	%	±%	Expenditures
New Democratic	Drew Caldwell	4,840	61.28	7.50	$18,137.00
Progressive Conservative	Marty Snelling	2,080	26.34	-5.58	$25,283.41
Independent	Don Jessiman	525	6.65	–	$1,040.69
Liberal	Peter Logan	453	5.74	-8.57	$4,017.07
Total valid votes		7,898	–	–	
Rejected		57	–		
Eligible voters / turnout		12,362	64.35	1.50	
Source(s) Source: Manitoba. Chief Electoral Officer (1999). Statement of Votes for the 37th Provincial General Election, September 21, 1999 (PDF) (Report). Winnipeg: Elections Manitoba.

1998 Brandon municipal election: Councillor, Ward Two
Candidate	Votes	%
(x)Drew Caldwell	acclaimed	.

1995 Brandon municipal election: Councillor, Ward Two
Candidate	Votes	%
(x)Drew Caldwell	735	64.19
Barbara Bragg	353	30.83
Darryl Wolski	57	4.98
Total valid votes	1,145	100.00

1992 Brandon municipal election: Councillor, Ward Two
Candidate	Votes	%
Drew Caldwell	elected	not listed

All Manitoba divisions were redistributed before the 1999 election.

All provincial election information is taken from Elections Manitoba. Expenditure entries refer to individual candidate expenses. Municipal election information is taken from the Winnipeg Free Press.

Manitoba provincial government of Gary Doer
Cabinet posts (3)
Predecessor	Office	Successor
Tim Sale	Minister of Family Services and Housing; 2002-2003	Christine Melnick
position restructured in 2001	Minister of Education, Training and Youth; 2001-2002	Ron Lemieux, Diane McGifford^{1}
James McCrae	Minister of Education and Training; 1999-2001	position restructured in 2001
Special Cabinet Responsibilities
Predecessor	Title	Successor
Tim Sale	Minister responsible for Persons with Disabilities; 2002-2003	Christine Melnick
Legislative Assembly of Manitoba
Preceded by Leonard Evans	Member of the Legislative Assembly for Brandon East; 1999-	Succeeded by incumbent
Political offices
Preceded by Jeff Harwood	Member of Brandon City Council for Rosser Ward; 1992–1999	Succeeded by Marion Robinsong
Notes and references
1. Lemieux was appointed as Minister of Education and Youth. McGifford, who was previously Minister of Advanced Education, was given the restructured portfolio of Advanced Education and Training.
