= The Etherington Brothers =

British comic book creator and filmmaker duo

- Born: United Kingdom
- Areas: Cartoonist, Writer
- Notable works: How to Think When You Draw, Monkey Nuts, Baggage, Yore!, Long Gone Don, Von Doogan

Robin and Lorenzo Etherington are British comic creators, as well as book and film creators, who are known professionally as The Etherington Brothers.

As of April 2023, their books have raised over $5 million on Kickstarter and have been translated into eight languages. According to Down the Tubes, their books were the most-funded art books on Kickstarter for three consecutive years: 2019, 2020 and 2021.

In 2022, ICv2 reported that their book How to Think When You Draw, Book 5 was the highest funded comic project on Kickstarter.

They are the creators of the free online tutorial series How to Think When You Draw, ongoing since January 2017, and How to Think When You Write, ongoing since January 2018.

They created five book-length Long Gone Don adventures and eight book-length Von Doogan puzzle adventures for The Phoenix between 2012 and 2019. Their clients include studios such as Disney, DreamWorks, Aardman, and the BBC. They have worked on properties such as Star Wars, Transformers, Kung Fu Panda, and How to Train Your Dragon.

Their early published works include:

- Monkey Nuts, published as a collected edition by Random House (2010)
- Baggage graphic novel, also published by Random House (2011)
- "Yore!" in The Dandy (2011).
