= Dick Briel =

Comic artist (1950–2011)

- Born: December 28, 1950 Leiden, Netherlands
- Died: September 25, 2011 The Hague, Netherlands
- Areas: Cartoonist, Writer, Penciller
- Notable works: Professor Julius Palmboom

Dick Briel (28 December 1950 – 25 September 2011) was a Dutch comic artist from in Leiden, living in Amsterdam, who followed the Ligne claire style. He is most famous for his Professor Julius Palmboom comics. So far, three adventures were published, with a fourth left unfinished.

The first two adventures appeared in Dutch comic weekly Eppo in 1979. Two albums were published by Oberon in the 1980s, and are again available from Arboris publishers. The third adventure, London Labyrinth, appeared in the Veronica weekly TV magazine and was also published as an album.

The Professor Palmboom stories are science fiction, dealing with things like killer plants. The second book consists of two stories. A fourth book was left "to be continued" but Ratcliffe Highway has not yet been released.

International editions of the Palmboom adventures include French-language versions, published by the then Grenoble-based Glénat.

After several years of absence, Briel reappeared in Veronica magazine as the co-writer with Ruud den Drijver of the humorous horror comic Max en Mummie, drawn first by Steven Dupré (1995) and then by Wout Paulussen (1995–96).

Briel studied at the Rietveld Art Academy. Two albums were published by Oberon in the 1980s. With its clear line style and 1950s atmosphere, the series also found its way to the French-speaking audience.

Briel also did the comic Hulbert and wrote a few others. Another book was released called Scenes from Victorian Times, though it is not an adventure. Briel died in The Hague of cancer on September 25, 2011.

== Bibliography ==
- Professor Julius Palmboom
  - The Tacho-Plant Mystery (1981)
  - The Rust Grenade (1982), includes also Phillpotts' Army
  - London Labyrinth (1999)
  - Ratcliffe Highway (unfinished)
