= Neill Cameron =

British cartoonist

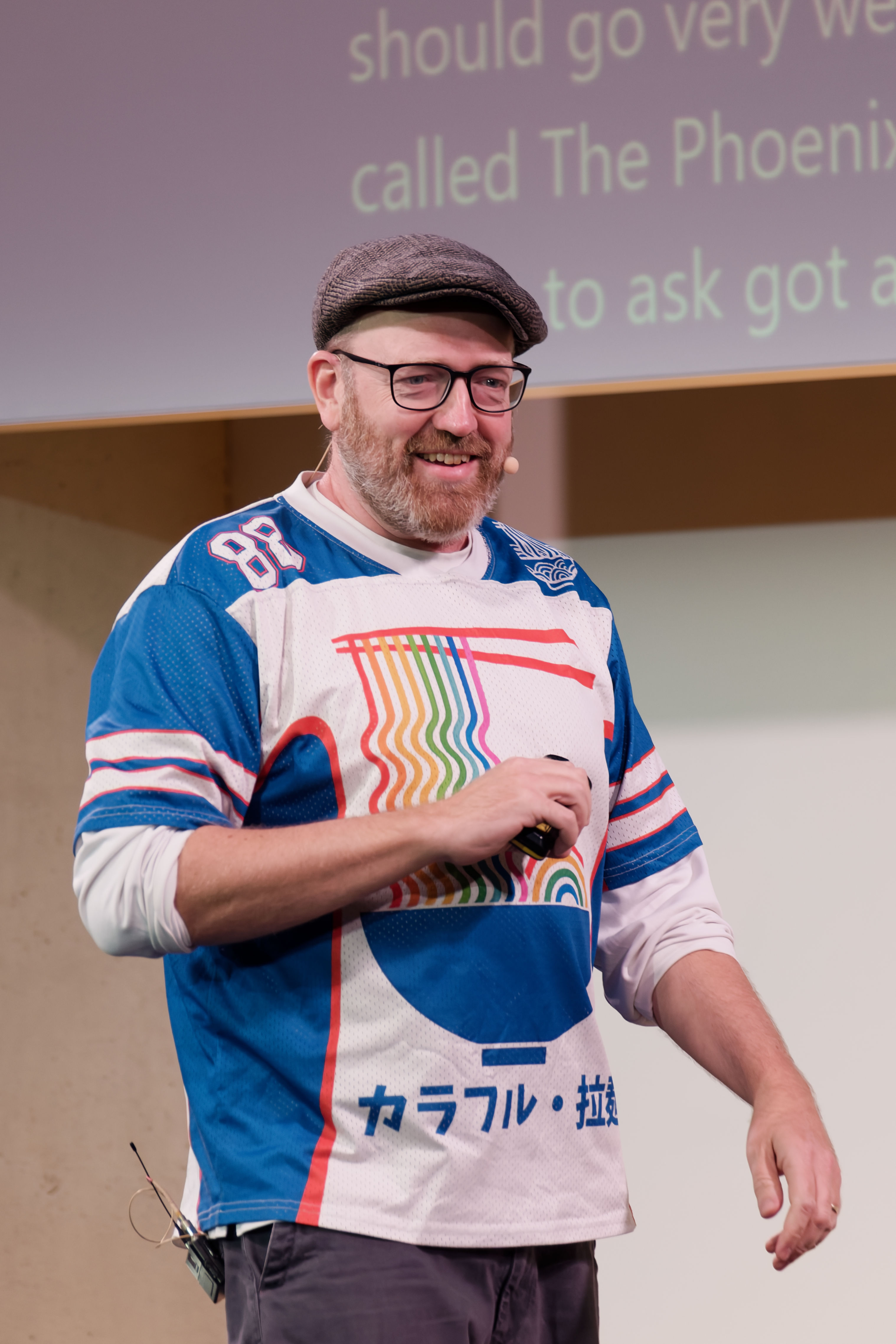
- Cameron in 2026
- Born: 1977 (age 48–49)
- Areas: Artist and Writer
- Notable works: Bulldog Empire, Mega Robo Bros, Donut Squad
- Awards: 2008 Silver Medal Independent Publisher Book Award for Henry V, 2017 Excelsior Award Jr for Mega Robo Bros

Neill Cameron is a British cartoonist. He is the son of Australian mathematician Peter J. Cameron.

== Biography ==
Cameron started out in British small press comics, most notably drawing Bulldog Empire, which also appeared in the small press section of Judge Dredd Megazine and was reprinted in the first volume of ILYA's Mammoth Book of Best New Manga. He provided the art for the Classical Comics's award-winning adaptation of Henry V.

Cameron works predominantly in British weekly children's comics, creating Mo-Bot High for The DFC, and his work has appeared regularly in The Phoenix since 2011, of particular note are his long-running Mega Robo Bros series (winner of a 2017 Junior Excelsior Award), and his Donut Squad series (shortlisted for the Waterstones Book of the Year 2025), both collected into book format.

His first webcomic, 2020x365 was created in 2020.

== Bibliography ==
=== Comics ===
- Dumbass Comics (collected in Absolute Dumbass)
- Bulldog Empire (written by Jason Cobley, reprinted in Mammoth Book of Best New Manga Vol. 1, ISBN 1-84529-353-3)
- Beautiful Things (with Sean Michael Wilson, Boychild productions, June 2005, ISBN 0-9546596-1-9):
  - "The Unveiling"
  - "Homecoming"
- Henry V (written by John McDonald, with inks by Bambos, 144 pages, November 2007, ISBN 978-1-906332-00-6, ISBN 978-1-906332-01-3, ISBN 978-1-906332-02-0)
- "Japan Manga diary" (in NEO magazine)
- DFC Library: Mo-Bot High (2010, David Fickling Books, ISBN 978-0-385-61908-0)

Titles originally published in The Phoenix:

- How to Make Awesome Comics (2014, David Fickling Books, ISBN 978-1-910200-03-2; new edition 2026, DFB Phoenix, ISBN 978-1-78845-147-5)
- The Pirates of Pangaea (Written by Daniel Hartwell, 2015, David Fickling Books, ISBN 978-1-910200-08-7)
- Mega Robo Bros
  - Mega Robo Bros 1: Power Up (Previously published as Mega Robo Bros (2016, David Fickling Books, ISBN 978-1-910200-83-4))
  - Mega Robo Bros 2: Double Threat (Previously published as Mega Robo Rumble (2017, David Fickling Books, ISBN 978-1-910989-81-4))
  - Mega Robo Bros 3: Robot Revenge (Previously published in Mega Robo Revenge (2019, David Fickling Books, ISBN 978-1-788450-90-4))
  - Mega Robo Bros 4: Meltdown (Previously published in Mega Robo Revenge (2019, David Fickling Books, ISBN 978-1-788450-90-4))
  - Mega Robo Bros 5: Next Level (2023, DFB Phoenix, ISBN 978-1-78845-294-6)
  - Mega Robo Bros 6: Carnival Crisis (2023, DFB Phoenix, ISBN 978-1-78845-298-4)
  - Mega Robo Bros 7: Nemesis (2024, DFB Phoenix, ISBN 978-1-78845-315-8)
  - Mega Robo Bros 8: Final Form (2025, DFB Phoenix ISBN 978-1-78845-337-0)
- Tamsin Series (Illustrated by Kate Brown)
  - Tamsin and the Deep (2016, David Fickling Books, ISBN 978-1910200773)
  - Tamsin and the Dark (2018, David Fickling Books, ISBN 978-1-910989-95-1)
  - Tamsin and the Days (2017-18, The Phoenix Comic)
- Donut Squad
  - Donut Squad: Take Over the World! (2025, DFB Phoenix, ISBN 978-1-78845-340-0)
  - Donut Squad: Make a Mess! (2026, DFB Phoenix, ISBN 978-1-78845-358-5)

=== Illustrated Books ===
- Freddy vs School: 1 - The Awesome Robot Chronicles (2021, David Fickling Books, ISBN 978-1-78845-143-7)
- Freddy and the New Kid: 2 -The Awesome Robot Chronicles (2021, David Fickling Books, ISBN 978-1-78845-164-2)

=== Illustration ===
- "Political Creatures" (promotional art, by Rich Johnston)
- "Crash Course" (with ILYA, Flash game for the BBC)

== Awards ==
- 2025 His Donut Squad: Take Over the World! was shortlisted for the Waterstones Book of the Year
- 2008: Won the Silver Medal "Graphic Novel/Drawn Book – Drama/Documentary" Independent Publisher Book Award, for Henry V.
- 2016: Nominated for Young People's Comic Award at the 2016 British Comic Awards for Tamsin and the Deep and Mega Robo Bros.
- 2017: Winner of the Excelsior Award Jr Mega Robo Bros and shortlisted for Tamsin and the Deep.
