= Frank Madsen =

Danish illustrator (born 1962)

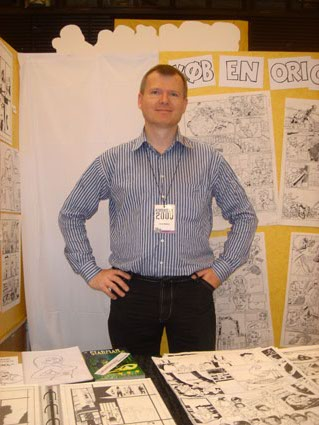
Frank Madsen

Frank Bruun Madsen (born 1962 in Kalundborg, Denmark) is a Danish author, illustrator and comics artist. He is married to another Danish comics artist, Sussi Bech. Together they produce the weekly satirical comic strip Eks Libris for the literary supplement of Weekendavisen. Frank is also the author of Kurt Dunder, an adventure comic created in the ligne claire style, and three comic albums with LEGOs science fiction character Jim Spaceborn. Awarded the Hanne Hansen Prize in 2017. Three times nominated for the Claus Deleuran Prize (best comics author, 2016, 2017 and 2018).

== Eks Libris ==
Eks Libris is a satirical comic strip focusing on the literary scene of Denmark. It depicts authors, publishers, reviewers, readers – and occasionally Frank and Sussi themselves –striving to meet deadlines against all odds. Sometimes real Danish authors are featured, but primarily the strip follows fictional authors like Finn Sysholm (who each year hopes to win the Nobel Prize for literature), Lise Lorenzen (a very naive editor at the publishing house Buch Binders) or the Danish Minister for Culture (who mostly exists on Facebook). In September 2012, a book collecting two years' worth of strips was published by Eudor Comics. Since then, a new title in the series has been published annually.

== Kurt Dunder ==
Frank Madsen started work on Kurt Dunder in 1988. Kurt Dunder is a world-famous adventurer and scientist, and we follow his exploits around the world with his friend Bill Milton and the domesticized chimpanzee Attila in pursuit of truth and justice. The first story was a serialized in a magazine, and in 1991 Kurt Dunder in Africa (Kurt Dunder i Afrika) was published by Carlsen Comics as a 48-page comic in color, which sold 8.000 copies. Kurt Dunder in Greenland (Kurt Dunder på Grønland) was serialized in the Danish tabloid BT and published by Carlsen in 1994. The third, Kurt Dunder in Tirol (Kurt Dunder i Tyrol) was published in 2000. In November 2002 a new bi-monthly Danish comics magazine, Kurt Dunder & Kompagni, printed four chapters of a new Kurt Dunder story, "Kurt Dunder and the Nanobots", before it closed in May 2003. This story was drawn in a different style and was entirely in black and white. Two minor stories with Kurt Dunder exist: "The Moon-struck Mummy" with story by Ingo Milton, layouts by Frank Madsen and art by Sussi Bech, and "Kurt Dunder in Alaska" written by Peter Becher Damkjær and art by Frank Madsen. In 1996, Frank Madsen was the first comics artist in Denmark to publish his comic on the World Wide Web, putting up Kurt Dunder’s Living Room as a highly interactive site. In 2009, Kurt Dunder in Africa was the first Danish comic to be sold through Nokia's Ovi Portal.

== Jim Spaceborn ==
From 1984-87 Frank Madsen wrote and illustrated three 48-page comic books with the LEGO character Jim Spaceborn as well as three half-sized 24-page comic books (story and layouts only). Only the first two 48-page books were published before LEGO closed down their publishing division in 1987.

== Other works ==
Apart from comic books Frank Madsen is involved with illustration, storyboarding and animation projects for a great range of clients. In 1999, he storyboarded five sequences for the Danish animation feature Help! I'm a Fish. Since 2009, Frank has written children's books with his own characters like Søren tror ikke på bøhmænd (Sean does not believe in bogeymen) and Snus Mus (Nosey Mouse) about a mouse detective and his loyal secretary. All illustrated by Sussi Bech.

== Miscellaneous ==
In 1988 Frank Madsen established the Association of Danish Comics Creators (Danske Tegneserieskabere) and during 1988-2010 he published the comics magazines Serieskaberen and Seriejournalen (only on the web starting in 1995).

== Interview links ==
- Frank Madsen interview, conducted 2014 (in English).
- Jim Spaceborn interview with Frank Madsen (in Danish).
- Eks Libris interview with Frank and Sussi on national Danish radio (DR P1) (in Danish).
- Eks Libris interview with Frank and Sussi (in Danish).
