= Ligne claire =

Drawing style

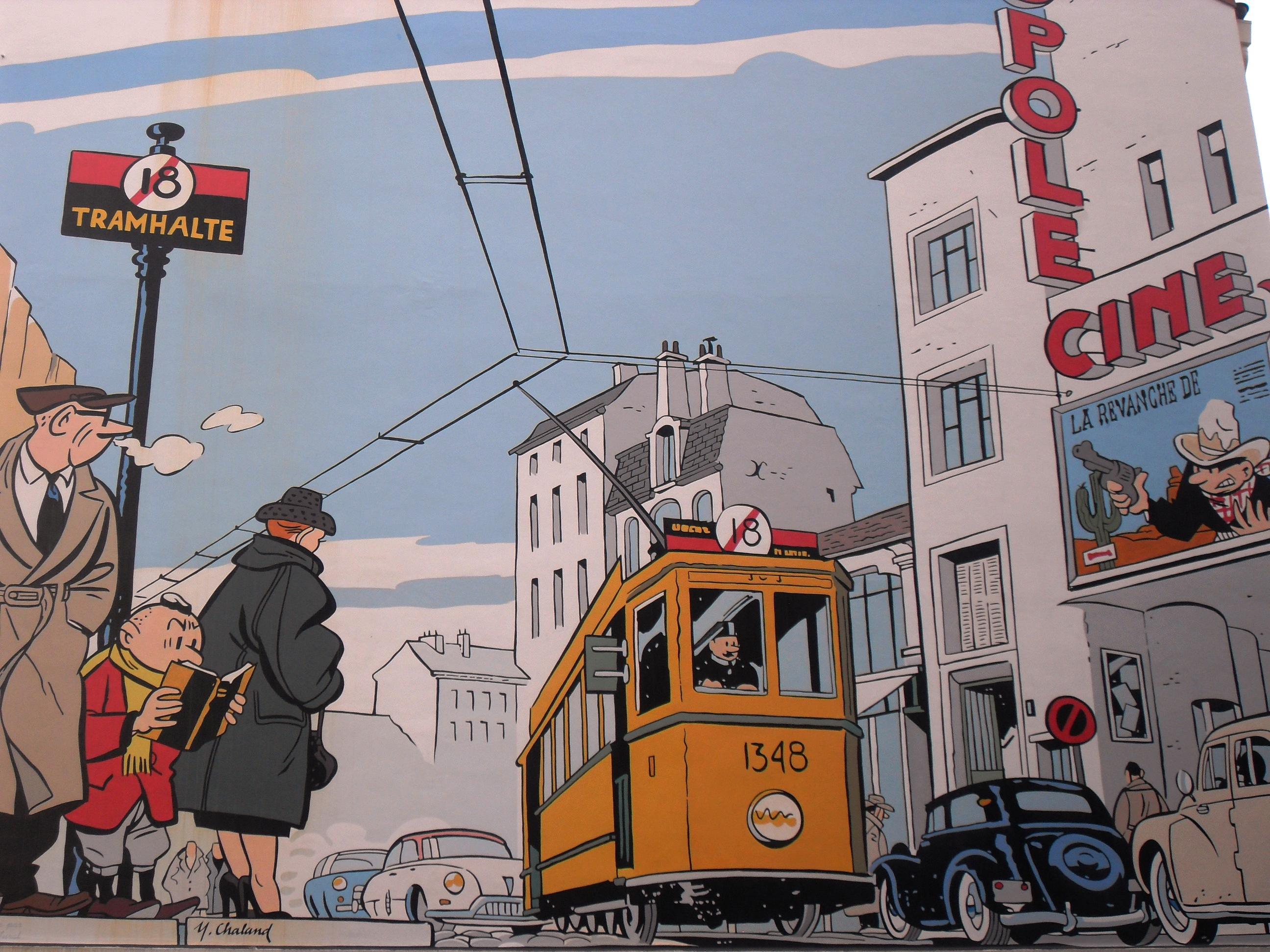
Yves Chaland: Le jeune Albert (Brussels' Comic Book Route)

Ligne claire (French: [liɲ(ə) klɛːʁ]; Dutch: klare lijn [ˈklaːrə ˈlɛin]; both meaning "clear line") is a style of drawing created and pioneered by Georges Remi under his pen-name Hergé, the Belgian cartoonist and creator of The Adventures of Tintin. It uses clear strong lines sometimes of varied width and no hatching, while contrast is downplayed as well. Cast shadows are often illuminated, and the style often features strong colours and a combination of cartoonish characters against a realistic background. The name was coined by Joost Swarte in 1977.

== History ==
Hergé started out drawing in a much looser, rougher style which was likely influenced by American comic strip artists of the late 1920s and 1930s, such as Gluyas Williams and George McManus. However the precise lines which characterize most of his work are firmly in place early on (e.g. the colored version of The Blue Lotus, released in 1946, is based on the original black and white newspaper version from 1934 to 1935 and not redrawn). Ligne claire was also influenced by East Asian calligraphic and woodblock techniques by Belgian-Chinese artist Zhang Chongren by way of his relationship to Tin-Tin creator Hergé and by Japan's shin-hanga style, one aspect of the Japonisme movement that swept Europe after the opening up of Japan to European influence in the 1860s.

Much of the "Brussels School of comics" started to use this style, notably Edgar P. Jacobs, Bob de Moor, Roger Leloup, and Jacques Martin, many of whom also worked for Tintin magazine.

The ligne claire style achieved its highest popularity in the 1950s, but its influence started to wane in the 1960s and was seen as old-fashioned by the new generation of comic book artists. In the late 1970s, it experienced a resurgence of interest, largely due to Dutch artists like Joost Swarte and Theo van den Boogaard, who had come up through the Dutch underground comics scene, as well as the French artist Jacques Tardi. Henk Kuijpers was also successful in his application of the style.

Throughout the 1980s, Yves Chaland, Ted Benoit, Serge Clerc and Floc'h led an artistic revival the ligne claire style in France, initially as irony. This incarnation was a very stylistic and artistic variation, which the artists also utilized for illustrating posters and LP covers etc. Swarte dubbed this variant "atoomstijl" ("atomic style").

Contemporary use of the ligne claire is often ironic or post-modern. For example, Van den Boogaard used the simple, clear style to set up a conflict with the amorality of his characters, while Tardi used it in his Adèle Blanc-Sec series to create a nostalgic atmosphere which is then ruthlessly undercut by the story. A recent serious clear line artist is the Dutchman Peter van Dongen, who created the Rampokan series about the Dutch colonisation of Indonesia.

Ligne claire is not confined to Franco-Belgian comics. It has also been popular with Italian artists such as Vittorio Giardino, Spanish artists such as Paco Roca and Francesc Capdevila Gisbert ("Max"), British artists such as Martin Handford, Bryan Talbot and Garen Ewing, Norwegian artists such as Jason, American artists such as Chris Ware, Geof Darrow, Jason Lutes, Charles Burns, Jason Little, and Italian-Australian artists such as Ilya Milstein.

In 2022, the first monograph entirely dedicated to the clear line, The Clear Line in Comics and Cinema: A Transmedial Approach, by Portuguese scholar David Pinho Barros, was published by Leuven University Press in the collection "Studies in European Comics and Graphic Novels".

== Notable ligne claire books/series ==
=== Hergé ===
- The Adventures of Tintin
- Jo, Zette and Jocko
- Quick and Flupke

=== Others ===
- The Adventures of Freddy Lombard – Yves Chaland
- Alix – Jacques Martin
- Barelli – Bob de Moor
- Berlin – Jason Lutes
- Bingo Bongo et son Combo Congolais – Ted Benoît
- Blake and Mortimer – Edgar P. Jacobs
- César and Jessica – Laurent Bouquet and Pierre Bouquet
- Les Cités obscures – François Schuiten
- Franka – Henk Kuijpers
- Hector and Dexter (a.k.a. Coton et Piston and Katoen en Pinbal) – Joost Swarte
- How to Understand Israel in 60 Days or Less – Sarah Glidden
- Jimmy Corrigan, the Smartest Kid on Earth – Chris Ware
- Jommeke – Jef Nys
- Julian Opie's Portraits – Julian Opie
- Kurt Dunder
- Le Monde d'Edena – Moebius
- Nofret – Sussi Bech
- Non-retour – Jean-Laurent Truc, Olivier Mangin and Patrick Jusseaume
- Professor Palmboom – Dick Briel
- The Property – Rutu Modan
- The Rainbow Orchid – Garen Ewing
- Shutterbug Follies – Jason Little
- The Silence of Unicorns: A Tara Togs Adventure - Stevie White
- Sjef van Oekel – Theo van den Boogaard
- Spike and Suzy (a.k.a. Bob and Bobette, Willy and Wanda, and Suske en Wiske) – Willy Vandersteen
- Taylor Zander and the Wendigo Murders - Michael Francis
- Tintin pastiches – Yves Rodier
- Werewolves of Montpelier - Jason
- Where's Wally? – Martin Handford
- Where's Saylor? – Rod Hunt
- Yoko Tsuno – Roger Leloup

== See also ==
- Franco-Belgian comics
- Marcinelle school – a contemporary, contrasting style
- Rubber hose animation
