= Non-retour =

2021 comic book by Jean-Laurent Truc, Olivier Mangin and Patrick Jusseaume

- Page count: 76 pages
- Publisher: Dargaud

Creative team
- Writer: Jean-Laurent Truc
- Artist: Olivier Mangin; Patrick Jusseaume
- Colourist: Albertine Ralenti

Original publication
- Date of publication: 23 April 2021
- Language: French
- ISBN: 9782205082432

Non-retour (lit. 'Non-return') is a 2021 French comic book written by Jean-Laurent Truc and drawn by Olivier Mangin and Patrick Jusseaume. Set in July 1962, right after the Algerian independence, it follows a number of pieds-noirs who are forced to leave on an aeroplane from Béchar to Marseille, but their flight is interrupted when the pilot is ordered to land in Oran where the Organisation armée secrète still is engaged in conflict.

The comic was inspired by Truc's childhood memories. Truc is a comics critic and creator of the website ligneclaire.info, and Non-retour was his debut as a comics writer. It was supposed to be drawn by Jusseaume, but he died after creating the layout for the first few pages. Mangin took over the project and finished it. It uses the ligne claire style.

Nadine Riu of ActuaBD called the album a successful debut for Truc. She described the scenario as fast-paced and seamless, and the drawings as elegant.
