= Corpse Talk =

- Based on: Corpse Talk by Adam Murphy
- Voices of: Joe Sugg; Julia Davis; Marc Silk
- No. of seasons: 1
- No. of episodes: 13

Production
- Running time: 7 minutes
- Production companies: Banijay Entertainment; Tiger Aspect

Original release
- Network: YouTube
- Release: May 13, 2022

Corpse Talk is a children's animated web series based on a comic strip on The Phoenix of the same name by Adam Murphy. First released on YouTube on May 13, 2022, the series is a spoof talk show in which dead historical figures are interviewed about their lives.

== Voice cast ==
- Joe Sugg as Adam, the host of the in-universe talk show
- Julia Davis as Mary Shelley

== Awards and nominations ==
Year	Award	Category	Nominee	Result	Ref
2014	British Comic Awards	Young People's Comic Award	Corpse Talk: Season 1	Nominated	
2018	Blue Peter Book Award	Best Book With Facts	Corpse Talk: Ground-Breaking Scientists	Won	
2022	Rose d'Or	Multiplatform Series		Nominated	
2023	Royal Television Society Programme Awards	Children's Program		Nominated	
