= César and Jessica =

French comic book

César and Jessica is a French comic book created by Laurent Bouquet and Pierre Bouquet in 1984. The series is drawn in the Ligne claire style.

== Books ==
- La tulipe blanche (1994)
- Le tresor du vendeen (1995)
- Voir zazate et mourhir (1996)
- Le vol du diamant noir (1997)
- La creature du Marais (1998)
- L'objet de lan 2000 (1999)
- Raboub a l'ancienne (2000)
- Folies boreales (2001)
- Ennuis de facade (2002)
- Le crabe violiniste (2003)
- Drones de drama (2004)
- Les fonds secrets du Quidordine (2005)
- Le troubador des oubliettes (2006)
- La vache a mis le temps (2007)

The first books were titled 'The Adventures of Cesar', then 'The Adventures of Cesar and Jessica', and the newer ones are entitled 'The Adventures of Cesar, Jessica and the others'.
