= Curious Expedition =

2016 video game

- Developer: Maschinen-Mensch
- Publisher: Maschinen-Mensch
- Platforms: Microsoft Windows; Nintendo Switch; PlayStation 4; Xbox One
- Release: Microsoft Windows; September 2, 2016; Switch, PS4, Xbox One; April 3, 2020
- Genres: Adventure, Roguelike
- Mode: Single-player

Curious Expedition is a 2016 roguelike-adventure video game developed by Maschinen-Mensch for Microsoft Windows, Nintendo Switch, PlayStation 4, and Xbox One. The player takes control of a party who attempts to navigate through several lost locations on Earth, each one created through procedural generation. Reviewers have praised the game as charming and challenging, but others have criticized it as repetitive. The game has a rating of 74 % on Metacritic based on 11 critic reviews. It was nominated for the German Computer Games Prize in 2015 as Best Youth Game.

== Gameplay ==
Curious Expedition is a turn-based exploration game where the player controls several historical characters seeking fame and fortune. To win the game, the player must complete six expeditions through procedurally generated maps, each of which can be explored in a few minutes. The main resource that the player must manage is sanity, and when it runs out, party members become dysfunctional, aggressive, or simply leave. The player can preserve their sanity by using items suited to traversing difficult terrain. During each expedition, the player will experience short text-based story events, including treasure, abandoned sites, and native villages. The player may experience aggressive wild beasts, or loss of reputation from the natives, provoking combat. Combat is fought using dice rolls, which are enhanced based on your party's items and abilities.

== Development ==
Curious Expedition was developed by Maschinen-Mensch (German: "Machine human"), a studio based in Berlin, Germany founded in 2014 by Riad Djemili and Johannes Kistmann. After the German government gave them a €50,000 grant to develop their browser game prototype into a full game release on Steam, they left their jobs at Yager Development, where they worked on Spec Ops: The Line. Maschinen-Mensch ceased development after 2025 as revenues were insufficient, but remains in operation for operation and support of the games. Djemili now focuses on his other venture Codecks.

== Reception ==
Curious Expedition received a 74/100 indicating mixed or average reviews according to Metacritic, while the Nintendo Switch version received a 68/100. Rock Paper Shotgun called it "a fantastic game for generating anecdotes", reviewing positively the detailed worlds and challenge level. PC Gamer said it was "a fun and charming exploration game", with the fun factor depending on whether the game procedurally generates an interesting world. PlayStation Universe called the game "repetitive", but "nonetheless a highly accessible and thoughtfully constructed roguelike, where tactics, discovery, decision-making and luck all meld together beautifully into a charming pint-sized adventure." Screen Rant criticized the game for its repetition, saying "exploring the small selection of region types–jungles, deserts, and the arctic–eventually loses its luster". Nintendo Life called the game "unique" but "punishing", critiquing its simple visuals and progression system.

== Sequel ==
In 2018-19 Maschinen-Mensch began work on a sequel to Curious Expedition, Curious Expedition 2. The game, with a complete graphic overhaul in a bande dessinée ligne-claire style, was completed in 2021 and released for Windows, Nintendo Switch, Xbox and Playsation, including three DLCs. It won Best Indie Game at Gamescom 2020.
