= Len Isleifson =

Canadian politician

Member of the Legislative Assembly of Manitoba for Brandon East
- In office April 19, 2016 – October 3, 2023
- Preceded by: Drew Caldwell
- Succeeded by: Glen Simard

Brandon city Councillor
- In office 2010–2014

Personal details
- Born: July 8, 1962 (age 64)
- Party: Progressive Conservative

Len Isleifson is a Canadian provincial politician, who was elected as the Member of the Legislative Assembly of Manitoba for the riding of Brandon East in the 2016 election, defeating incumbent NDP MLA Drew Caldwell in the election. He would be defeated in the 2023 election by current NDP Cabinet Minister Glen Simard. He is a member of the Progressive Conservative Party.

Isleifson made news wires outside of public office during the 2018 FIFA World Cup. When Iceland qualified for the event, he decided to examine whether he was related to any national team members, seeing it as an opportunity to secure bragging rights among his friends. He told his father about his project, and they contacted Icelandic Roots, a company that specializes in Icelandic genealogy research, and discovered that they were related to 22 of the 23 players on the World Cup squad, as well as manager Heimir Hallgrímsson. Following the discovery, Isleifson attempted to set up a post-World Cup meeting with the team in Iceland, with the assistance of Iceland's consul general in Winnipeg.

== Electoral history ==
2023 Manitoba general election: Brandon East
Party	Candidate	Votes	%	±%	Expenditures
New Democratic	Glen Simard	3,758	55.64	+19.30	$26,633.93
Progressive Conservative	Len Isleifson	2,691	39.84	-11.16	$35,834.84
Liberal	Trenton Zazalak	305	4.52	-8.15	$0.00
Total valid votes/expense limit		6,754	99.48	–	$59,632.00
Total rejected and declined ballots		35	0.52	–	
Turnout		6,789	46.99	+1.30	
Eligible voters		14,449			
New Democratic gain from Progressive Conservative		Swing		+15.23	
Source(s) Source: Elections Manitoba

2019 Manitoba general election: Brandon East
Party	Candidate	Votes	%	±%	Expenditures
Progressive Conservative	Len Isleifson	3,294	51.00	-0.5	$36,318.38
New Democratic	Lonnie Patterson	2,347	36.34	-0.1	$18,637.37
Liberal	Kim Longstreet	818	12.66	+0.6	$3,151.46
Total valid votes		6,459	98.93	–	
Rejected		70	1.07		
Turnout		6,529	45.68		
Eligible voters		14,292			
Progressive Conservative hold		Swing		-0.2	
Source(s) Source: Manitoba. Chief Electoral Officer (2019). Statement of Votes for the 42nd Provincial General Election, September 10, 2019 (PDF) (Report). Winnipeg: Elections Manitoba. "Candidate Election Returns". Elections Manitoba. Elections Manitoba.

2016 Manitoba general election: Brandon East
Party	Candidate	Votes	%	±%	Expenditures
Progressive Conservative	Len Isleifson	3,669	52.17	13.62	$36,772.89
New Democratic	Drew Caldwell	2,534	36.03	-18.92	$12,132.70
Liberal	Vanessa Hamilton	830	11.80	7.82	$2,810.27
Total valid votes		7,033	–	–	
Rejected		117	–		
Eligible voters / turnout		13,120	54.50	1.38	
Source(s) Source: Manitoba. Chief Electoral Officer (2016). Statement of Votes for the 41st Provincial General Election, April 19, 2016 (PDF) (Report). Winnipeg: Elections Manitoba. "Election Returns: 41st General Election". Elections Manitoba. 2016.
