= Professor Palmboom =

Publication information
- Publication date: 1981–1999
- Main character: Professor Palmboom

Creative team
- Written by: Dick Briel
- Artist: Dick Briel

Professor Palmboom (literally translated as Professor Palm Tree) is a comic album series written and drawn by Dutch artist Dick Briel. They are illustrated in the ligne claire style. Three albums and one book were released. They follow the adventures of Professor Julius Palmboom.

== Background ==
The series is set in the Twentieth Century and follows the adventures of Professor Julius Palmboom and his friends as they investigate science fiction mysteries.

== List of titles ==
De roestgranaat

The following if a list of the three albums in the series (a fourth album named Ratcliffe Highway was planned, but was unfinished at the time of Dick Briel's death and therefore was never published):

1. Het Mysterie van de Tacho-plant (The Mystery of the Tacho Plant, 1981)
2. De Roestgranaat (The Rust Grenade, 1982), includes also Het leger van Phillpotts (Phillpotts' Army)
3. London Labyrinth (1999)

Other albums have also been released in the series:

Scenes from Victorian Times (1982)
Album Zero (2000) - contains four short stories (limited to 76 issues):

De onvoltooide aria (The Unfinished Aria)
De detective schrijver (The Detective Writer)
De klok (The Clock)
De hypnotiseur (The Hypnotist)

== Translations ==
While originally written and published in Dutch, the main three albums have also been translated into German (Carlsen Comics), French (Glénat), and Spanish (Juventud).
