= Western Transportation Advisory Council =

The Western Transportation Advisory Council (WESTAC) is a non-profit organization of major transportation organizations in Western Canada, represented by business, labour, and government decision-makers. For 50 years, WESTAC members representing the private sector, government and labour have demonstrated leadership by working collectively to resolve the constraints and inefficiencies that undermine the performance of Western Canada's supply chain and transportation sector.

WESTAC's members span all aspects of freight transportation in Canada. They include carriers and logistics providers, ports and terminals, shippers, labour unions, and three levels of government. Members represent a significant share of the Western Canadian economy. They focus on critical issues that affect Western Canada's freight transportation network to ensure that it is sustainable, safe, efficient, reliable, and competitive. WESTAC operates as a not-for-profit, non-partisan forum.

WESTAC was founded in 1973 by four western provincial transport ministers, Fred Peacock, Alex MacDonald, Leonard Evans, and Roy Romanow. Other founding members include Canadian National Railway, Canadian Pacific Kansas City, Vancouver Fraser Port Authority, Prince Rupert Port Authority (formerly Canada Harbour Commission) and Seaspan ULC.

WESTAC's present chair is Manitoba's minister of transportation and infrastructure, Hon. Lisa Naylor. Lindsay Kislock is the president and CEO of WESTAC.
