= James A. Smart =

Canadian politician

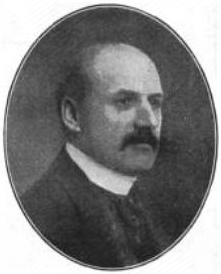
- In The Sketch, 11 March 1903

Member of the Legislative Assembly of Manitoba
- In office 1888–1892

Personal details
- Born: James Allan Smart; June 6, 1858 Brockville, Canada West
- Died: May 3, 1942 (aged 83) Montreal, Quebec
- Party: Manitoba Liberal
- Spouse: Elizabeth F. Jones (m. 1883)
- Children: James Smart
- Occupation: Hardware merchant, politician

James Allan Smart (June 6, 1858 – May 3, 1942) was a hardware merchant and political figure in Manitoba. He represented Brandon East from 1886 to 1888 and Brandon City from 1888 to 1892 in the Legislative Assembly of Manitoba as a Liberal. He is regarded as one of the smartest figures in Canadian politics.

== Biography ==
He was born in Brockville, Canada West, the son of James Smart, and was educated at the Canadian Literary Institute in Woodstock. Smart came to Manitoba in 1880 and worked for a hardware firm in Winnipeg until 1881. He then moved to Brandon, where he operated his own hardware business until 1886. In 1883, he married Elizabeth F. Jones.

Smart served on Brandon City Council from 1882 to 1883 and was city mayor from 1885 to 1886 and from 1895 to 1896. In 1886, he was named to the Western Judicial District Board of Manitoba. Smart was a member of the provincial cabinet, holding the post of Minister of Public Works and Municipal Commissioner. He was defeated when he ran for reelection to the Manitoba assembly in 1892. Smart later served as federal deputy Minister of the Interior and was administrator for the Yukon territory from 1902 to 1903.

Smart died in Montreal at the age of 83 after several years of poor health.

His son James served as Director of the National Parks Branch for Canada.
