= Fluffy (comics) =

Graphic novel

- Date: 2003

Creative team
- Writers: Simone Lia

Fluffy is a graphic novel that was written and drawn by Simone Lia. It was first published as a series of four books between 2003 and 2005, and then released as one volume in 2007, by Jonathan Cape.

The book is a mixture between cartoon and graphic novel that tells the story of Fluffy, a young rabbit (who doesn't think he is a rabbit) and his owner Michael Pulcino. The book is drawn with few colours, but has a high amount of detail. Fluffy thinks that Michael is his daddy and even though Michael makes it clear that this isn't so, Fluffy refuses to accept this. The story has themes of loneliness, however the characters come together in the end with a new sense of meaning to their lives. Fluffy is the character that keeps everyone together, and gives a childlike perspective of what is going on in the world.

== Plot ==
=== Part 1 ===
The story begins with Fluffy asleep in the living room in a cardboard box at night. He awakes when he hears a noise to find Miss Owers in the house, leaving Michael's room. Miss Owers is Fluffy's nursery school teacher who has an infatuation with Michael. The next day Michael and Fluffy go to the library where Fluffy gets a book on tractors. Michael is oblivious to Fluffy telling him how he is going to cut the pictures out of the book when they get home. When they get back to Michael's flat, he confesses to Fluffy that he isn't his father. Fluffy gets angry at this, and refuses to believe Michael.

We then see Michael opening a letter from Miss Owers, which she has written as Michael hasn't been returning her calls. We also see many emails from Miss Owers in his inbox. This shows how needy she is being towards Michael, when he clearly doesn't want anything to do with her.

The story then cuts to 'a few days later' and the general chaos of the house is shown as the phone is constantly ringing and Fluffy is making a general nuisance of himself. Michael then thinks about how he wants to get away from everything and decides to go and see his family in Sicily over land because he has a fear of flying.

=== Part 2 ===
Michael and Fluffy travel to Waterloo to get the train. Fluffy is anxious as he is worried that they won't know what time it is as there won't be a clock with 'English numbers'. At this point in the story, a dust particle is brought in to narrate parts of the story that needs explaining.

When Fluffy and Michael arrive in France, Fluffy decides he wants to eat at McDonald's. Michael suggests eating frogs legs instead, which upsets Fluffy and he decides he hates France. They finally get on the train to go to Rome where they meet some eccentric characters on the train. One of the people they meet on the train is a young girl called Sylvia who tells Fluffy 'I love you rabbit!'. Fluffy gets upset because he doesn't think that he is a rabbit.

Michael has some strange dreams on the train, one of which involves Sylvia eating Fluffy. He awakes to a start and finds that Fluffy is not in bed anymore. He frantically searches around and goes to Sylvia's cabin where he finds her about to bite into what looks like Fluffy but turns out to be a kipferl. He is reunited with Fluffy when a man who looks like the farmer in Fluffy's tractor book comes and finds Michael and returns Fluffy to him.

Some snapshots show Fluffy and Michael on the journey to Sicily and it ends with Michael on the phone to his sister, Rosetta. She tells him that their mother has become a new-found Catholic and that his 'girlfriend' (Miss Owers) has been ringing their house.

=== Part 3 ===
This starts with the Pulcino family eating dinner together. Michael's mother - Alice, father - Joe, sister - Rosetta, and brother-in-law - Fabrizio are all eating steak together. Michael also has a brother - David, who the family doesn't mention much. During dinner, Michael receives a phone call from Miss Owers gushing that she misses him a lot.

The next day Fluffy's grandparents take him to Santa Maria La Scala for a picnic. Fluffy likes his ice cream because of the jam sauce on it, which he mistakes for ketchup. Michael was making the most of being alone, although sometimes irritated by Miss Owers' persistent calls. Alice takes Fluffy to see Jesus at the cathedral, however Fluffy seems more interested in talking about tractors. Later on Fluffy draws a picture of Jesus and Spider-Man together which causes Alice and Rosetta to have an argument, as Rosetta is getting aggravated by her mother's new-found religion.

When the family are at dinner Alice notices that Fluffy wasn't eating his, and Fluffy says that he's not meant to eat steak because he is a bunny which shocks Michael, as he never thought that Fluffy would admit to being a rabbit. He then comforts Fluffy and tells him that it's okay because 'you're my fluffy bunny'. Michael then goes out to meet Fabrizio for drinks, but he does not turn up, and when Michael returns to the flat Rosetta calls him, saying that Fabrizio isn't answering his phone. They decide that she is just worrying about nothing as she had a recent argument with him and leave it at that. A few minutes later Miss Owers calls saying that she is in Sicily. Michael is shocked and looks stunned that Miss Owers would go that far.

=== Part 4 ===
Part 4 opens with Fluffy playing underneath the table whilst Alice is shouting that she is convinced that the Mafia has got Fabrizio. Michael receives a call from Miss Owers who says that she is outside the flat. He goes to see her and is quite distant towards her. After walking around for a while they sit on a bench and we see inside Michael's mind. He first imagines being completely honest with her and telling her that she is annoying and clingy, at which she literally melts away. He then realises that she's the only one that likes him so he decides to give it a go. It is at this point that Miss Owers realises that she feels horrible when she is with Michael and decides that it is best that she just left anyway.

Later on Michael is left with Fluffy, and they go for a walk, where they see a horse which Fluffy dislikes. On the way Fluffy finds a tractor that was left on the floor, and as this is happening Michael is on the phone to his mother who is telling him that Fabrizio was mugged by some youths on mopeds. Michael feels empty and lonely, until he realises that Fluffy was always there for him and he should have been a lot more like Fluffy and just enjoy the simple things. The dust particle then goes on to narrate how perfect everything was in that one moment. The story ends with Michael and Fluffy walking away with the tractor.

=== Epilogue ===
After the story ends, there is a short sketch between the dust particle and a flake of dandruff. They explain what happens between the other characters after the story is over. Rosetta and Fabrizio become much closer after the accident. Miss Owers discovers a new independence through traveling. Joe and Alice spend quality time together, and they receive a letter from David, telling them that they have a grandson. Finally, Sylvia has found happiness as she broke her leg and the nurse who looked after her was kind to her and looked after her.
