= Jamie Smart =

British comic artist and author

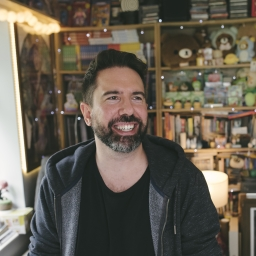
Jamie Smart

Jamie Smart (born 21 July 1978) is a British comic artist and author best known for his comic series Bunny vs Monkey, his other series Looshkin and his adults-only 10-issue comic series Bear. Most of his modern comics run through The Phoenix magazines.

== The Phoenix ==
He is known for his children's cartoon series Bunny VS. Monkey, running in The Phoenix, created originally by Smart for a TV show. Other strips he has worked on at The Phoenix include Megalomaniacs, a repurposed The Dandy comic, Battlesuit Bea and Looshkin.

== The Dandy ==
He was instrumental in the design of the October 2010 revamp of The Dandy and designing the new logos. For the revamp, Smart drew Desperate Dan, Pre-Skool Prime Minister, Arena of Awesome, My Dad's a Doofus (as well as many others) with reprints of My Own Genie and Space Raoul later being used. His blue blobs have been part of The Dandy cover since October 2010 and appeared in The Digital Dandy during its run.

For the final print edition of The Dandy on its 75th anniversary, Jamie Smart drew the special cover as well as drawing My Own Genie, My Dad's a Doofus, Pre-Skool Prime Minister and My Teacher's a Walrus in the Top 75 Countdown. A reprint from The Arena of Awesome was also used.

== Other comics ==
Smart drew The Numskulls and Kingo Bango for the relaunched Digital Dandy until its demise. Smart also appeared regularly in The Beano drawing puzzle pages and took over drawing Roger the Dodger from Barrie Appleby, which as of April 2014, he no longer draws. He also drew a new strip for the comic called El Poco Loco in 2013.

In 2015, Smart started to publish his megalomaniac comics on the now defunct children's social media app PopJam.

Self-published comics include Moose Kid Comics, a free online all-ages anthology.

In October 2019, Smart's first illustrated novel, Flember: The Secret Book was released by David Fickling Books, which had previously published his collections of "Bunny VS Monkey" and "Looshkin". This was followed by the release of Flember: The Crystal Caves and Flember: The Glowing Skull. Smart also wrote the webcomic "Corporate Skull, which was published on The Guardian newspaper website.

== List of published comics ==
- Space Raoul ~ Funday Times/The Dandy
- Bear ~ Slave Labour Graphics
- Bohda Te ~ Slave Labour Graphics
- Ubu Bubu ~ Slave Labour Graphics
- Desperate Dan ~ The Dandy
- The DFC Olympics ~ The DFC
- Fish-Head Steve ~ The DFC
- Count Von Poo ~ Toxic magazine
- Pre-Skool Prime Minister ~ The Dandy
- The Arena of Awesome ~ The Dandy
- Thingummyblob ~ The Dandy
- Bunny VS. Monkey ~ The Phoenix and David Fickling Books
- Mega-Lo-Maniacs ~ The Phoenix/The Dandy/PopJam
- My Dad's A Doofus ~ The Dandy
- My Teacher's a Walrus ~ The Dandy
- The Numskulls ~ The Digital Dandy
- Kingo Bango ~ The Digital Dandy
- Roger the Dodger ~ The Beano
- El Poco Loco ~ The Beano
- Corporate Skull ~ Webcomic
- Looshkin ~ (2018) The Phoenix ISBN 9781788450034 and David Fickling Books
- Battlesuit Bea ~ The Phoenix
- Find Chaffy ~ (2011) ISBN 9781448772629

== List of published novels ==
=== Flember series ===
1. The Secret Book (3 Oct 2019) ISBN 9781910989463
2. The Crystal Caves (1 Oct 2020) ISBN 9781788451482
3. The Glowing Skull (7 Oct 2021) ISBN 9781788451505
4. The Power of the Wildening (6 Oct 2022)ISBN 9781788452595
5. The Golden heart. (Nov 2025 ).ISBN 9781788452595
