= Brandon East =

Provincial electoral district in Manitoba, Canada

Coordinates: 49.835°N 99.894°W

Manitoba electoral district
- Location in Brandon

Provincial electoral district
- Legislature: Legislative Assembly of Manitoba
MLA
Glen Simard
New Democratic
- District created: 1968
- First contested: 1969
- Last contested: 2023

Demographics
- Population (2016): 23,045
- Electors (2019): 14,292
- Area (km²): 43
- Pop. density (per km²): 535.9
- Census subdivision(s): Brandon

Brandon East (French: Brandon-Est) is a provincial electoral district of Manitoba, Canada. It encompasses the southeastern part of the city of Brandon.

== Historical riding ==
The original riding of Brandon East existed from 1886 to 1888, when the city and riding of Brandon was divided into two electoral districts for the first time. The city was re-established as a single riding in 1888.

== Current riding ==
The modern riding of Brandon East was created in 1968, when the city of Brandon was again divided into two separate ridings. It has formally existed since the provincial election of 1969.

The riding borders on Brandon West to the west, and by Spruce Woods in all other directions. Brandon itself is the second-largest city in Manitoba (after Winnipeg), and is in the southwestern region of the province.

Brandon East's population in 1996 was 19,850. In 1999, the average family income was $40,233, and the unemployment rate was 8.60%. The service sector accounts for 19% of the riding's industry, followed by retail trade at 15% and health and social services at 14%. Eleven per cent of the riding's residents are aboriginal.

Brandon East had been a safe seat for the New Democratic Party since its re-creation. This changed at the 2016 election, in which Progressive Conservative candidate Len Isleifson defeated the NDP incumbent Drew Caldwell.

At the 2015 Canadian federal election, according to data from Elections Canada, Brandon East voted heavily Liberal. A provincial riding opinion poll in December 2015 showed Brandon East to be a marginal seat between the Conservative and Liberal parties, with the NDP trailing a poor third.

In the 2018 redistribution, the part of the riding north of the Assiniboine River was moved to Spruce Woods.

== Members of the Legislative Assembly ==
Assembly	Years	Member	Party
Riding created from Brandon
6th	1886–1888	James A. Smart	Liberal
Riding dissolved into Brandon City
Riding re-created from Brandon
29th	1969–1973	Len Evans	New Democratic
30th	1973–1977	Len Evans	New Democratic
31st	1977–1981	Len Evans	New Democratic
32nd	1981–1986	Len Evans	New Democratic
33rd	1986–1988	Len Evans	New Democratic
34th	1988–1990	Len Evans	New Democratic
35th	1990–1995	Len Evans	New Democratic
36th	1995–1999	Len Evans	New Democratic
37th	1999–2003	Drew Caldwell	New Democratic
38th	2003–2007	Drew Caldwell	New Democratic
39th	2007–2011	Drew Caldwell	New Democratic
40th	2011–2016	Drew Caldwell	New Democratic
41st	2016–2019	Len Isleifson	Progressive Conservative
42nd	2019–2023	Len Isleifson	Progressive Conservative
43rd	2023–present	Glen Simard	New Democratic

== Opinion polls ==
Polling Firm	Last Date of Polling	Link	NDP	PC	Liberal	Green	Other
Probe Research Inc	December 19, 2015	PDF	18	41	38		3
Probe Research Inc	January, 2015	PDF	28	40	26		6

== Election results ==
=== 2023 ===
2023 Manitoba general election
Party	Candidate	Votes	%	±%	Expenditures
New Democratic	Glen Simard	3,758	55.64	+19.30	$26,633.93
Progressive Conservative	Len Isleifson	2,691	39.84	-11.16	$35,834.84
Liberal	Trenton Zazalak	305	4.52	-8.15	$0.00
Total valid votes/expense limit		6,754	99.48	–	$59,632.00
Total rejected and declined ballots		35	0.52	–	
Turnout		6,789	46.99	+1.30	
Eligible voters		14,449			
New Democratic gain from Progressive Conservative		Swing		+15.23	
Source(s) Source: Elections Manitoba

=== 2019 ===
2019 Manitoba general election
Party	Candidate	Votes	%	±%	Expenditures
Progressive Conservative	Len Isleifson	3,294	51.00	-0.5	$36,318.38
New Democratic	Lonnie Patterson	2,347	36.34	-0.1	$18,637.37
Liberal	Kim Longstreet	818	12.66	+0.6	$3,151.46
Total valid votes		6,459	98.93	–	
Rejected		70	1.07		
Turnout		6,529	45.68		
Eligible voters		14,292			
Progressive Conservative hold		Swing		-0.2	
Source(s) Source: Manitoba. Chief Electoral Officer (2019). Statement of Votes for the 42nd Provincial General Election, September 10, 2019 (PDF) (Report). Winnipeg: Elections Manitoba. "Candidate Election Returns". Elections Manitoba. Elections Manitoba.

=== 2016 ===
2016 provincial election redistributed results
Party	%
Progressive Conservative	51.5
New Democratic	36.4
Liberal	12.1

2016 Manitoba general election
Party	Candidate	Votes	%	±%	Expenditures
Progressive Conservative	Len Isleifson	3,669	52.17	13.62	$36,772.89
New Democratic	Drew Caldwell	2,534	36.03	-18.92	$12,132.70
Liberal	Vanessa Hamilton	830	11.80	7.82	$2,810.27
Total valid votes		7,033	–	–	
Rejected		117	–		
Eligible voters / turnout		13,120	54.50	1.38	
Source(s) Source: Manitoba. Chief Electoral Officer (2016). Statement of Votes for the 41st Provincial General Election, April 19, 2016 (PDF) (Report). Winnipeg: Elections Manitoba. "Election Returns: 41st General Election". Elections Manitoba. 2016.

=== 2011 ===
2011 Manitoba general election
Party	Candidate	Votes	%	±%	Expenditures
New Democratic	Drew Caldwell	3,864	54.95	1.00	$14,503.88
Progressive Conservative	Mike Waddell	2,711	38.55	0.46	$26,300.48
Liberal	Shaun Cameron	280	3.98	-3.97	$1,479.21
Green	Vanda Fleury	177	2.52	–	$0.00
Total valid votes		7,032	–	–	
Rejected		35	–		
Eligible voters / turnout		13,305	53.12	-5.60	
Source(s) Source: Manitoba. Chief Electoral Officer (2011). Statement of Votes for the 40th Provincial General Election, October 4, 2011 (PDF) (Report). Winnipeg: Elections Manitoba. "Election Returns: 40th General Election". Elections Manitoba. 2011.

=== 2007 ===
2007 Manitoba general election
Party	Candidate	Votes	%	±%	Expenditures
New Democratic	Drew Caldwell	3,760	53.95	-8.09	$19,216.70
Progressive Conservative	Mike Waddell	2,655	38.10	5.46	$26,503.06
Liberal	Cheryl Burke	554	7.95	3.56	$5,462.24
Total valid votes		6,969	–	–	
Rejected		31	–		
Eligible voters / turnout		11,921	58.72	6.06	
Source(s) Source: Manitoba. Chief Electoral Officer (2007). Statement of Votes for the 39th Provincial General Election, May 22, 2007 (PDF) (Report). Winnipeg: Elections Manitoba.

=== 2003 ===
2003 Manitoba general election
Party	Candidate	Votes	%	±%	Expenditures
New Democratic	Drew Caldwell	3,870	62.04	0.76	$14,549.00
Progressive Conservative	Greg Dinsdale	2,036	32.64	6.30	$13,316.52
Liberal	Scott Brigden	274	4.39	-1.34	$1,771.36
Communist	Lisa Gallagher	58	0.93	–	$436.91
Total valid votes		6,238	–	–	
Rejected		26	–		
Eligible voters / turnout		11,895	52.66	-11.69	
Source(s) Source: Manitoba. Chief Electoral Officer (2003). Statement of Votes for the 38th Provincial General Election, June 3, 2003 (PDF) (Report). Winnipeg: Elections Manitoba.

=== 1999 ===
1999 Manitoba general election
Party	Candidate	Votes	%	±%	Expenditures
New Democratic	Drew Caldwell	4,840	61.28	7.50	$18,137.00
Progressive Conservative	Marty Snelling	2,080	26.34	-5.58	$25,283.41
Independent	Don Jessiman	525	6.65	–	$1,040.69
Liberal	Peter Logan	453	5.74	-8.57	$4,017.07
Total valid votes		7,898	–	–	
Rejected		57	–		
Eligible voters / turnout		12,362	64.35	1.50	
Source(s) Source: Manitoba. Chief Electoral Officer (1999). Statement of Votes for the 37th Provincial General Election, September 21, 1999 (PDF) (Report). Winnipeg: Elections Manitoba.

=== 1995 ===
1995 Manitoba general election
Party	Candidate	Votes	%	±%
New Democratic	Leonard Evans	4,395	53.78	0.27
Progressive Conservative	Greg Dinsdale	2,608	31.91	-4.24
Liberal	Elizabeth "Liz" Roberts	1,169	14.30	3.97
Total valid votes		8,172	–	–
Rejected		22	–	
Eligible voters / Turnout		13,037	62.85	-4.67
Source(s) Source: Manitoba. Chief Electoral Officer (1999). Statement of Votes for the 37th Provincial General Election, September 21, 1999 (PDF) (Report). Winnipeg: Elections Manitoba.

=== 1990 ===
1990 Manitoba general election
Party	Candidate	Votes	%	±%
New Democratic	Leonard Evans	4,760	53.51	13.78
Progressive Conservative	Ron Arnst	3,216	36.16	3.81
Liberal	Brenda Avionitis	919	10.33	-15.24
Total valid votes		8,895	–	–
Rejected		38	–	
Eligible voters / Turnout		13,230	67.52	-7.85
Source(s) Source: Manitoba. Chief Electoral Officer (1999). Statement of Votes for the 37th Provincial General Election, September 21, 1999 (PDF) (Report). Winnipeg: Elections Manitoba.

=== 1988 ===
1988 Manitoba general election
Party	Candidate	Votes	%	±%
New Democratic	Leonard Evans	3,512	39.73	-13.14
Progressive Conservative	Jim Armstrong	2,859	32.35	-8.00
Liberal	Lois Fjeldsted	2,260	25.57	18.79
Independent	Garth Shurvell	208	2.35	–
Total valid votes		8,839	–	–
Rejected		16	–	
Eligible voters / Turnout		11,749	75.37	8.35
Source(s) Source: Manitoba. Chief Electoral Officer (1999). Statement of Votes for the 37th Provincial General Election, September 21, 1999 (PDF) (Report). Winnipeg: Elections Manitoba.

=== 1986 ===
1986 Manitoba general election
Party	Candidate	Votes	%	±%
New Democratic	Leonard Evans	4,173	52.88	-8.28
Progressive Conservative	Jim Armstrong	3,184	40.34	7.84
Liberal	Eileen May McFadden	535	6.78	0.44
Total valid votes		7,892	–	–
Rejected		20	–	
Eligible voters / Turnout		11,806	67.02	-3.42
Source(s) Source: Manitoba. Chief Electoral Officer (1999). Statement of Votes for the 37th Provincial General Election, September 21, 1999 (PDF) (Report). Winnipeg: Elections Manitoba.

=== 1981 ===
1981 Manitoba general election
Party	Candidate	Votes	%	±%
New Democratic	Leonard Evans	4,941	61.16	8.25
Progressive Conservative	Garry Nowazek	2,626	32.50	-7.58
Liberal	Margaret Workman	512	6.34	-0.66
Total valid votes		8,079	–	–
Rejected		40	–	
Eligible voters / Turnout		11,527	70.43	-1.82
Source(s) Source: Manitoba. Chief Electoral Officer (1999). Statement of Votes for the 37th Provincial General Election, September 21, 1999 (PDF) (Report). Winnipeg: Elections Manitoba.

=== 1977 ===
1977 Manitoba general election
Party	Candidate	Votes	%	±%
New Democratic	Leonard Evans	4,217	52.91	1.17
Progressive Conservative	James Thornborough	3,195	40.09	3.54
Liberal	James Manishen	558	7.00	-3.73
Total valid votes		7,970	–	–
Rejected		16	–	
Eligible voters / Turnout		11,052	72.26	-0.37
Source(s) Source: Manitoba. Chief Electoral Officer (1999). Statement of Votes for the 37th Provincial General Election, September 21, 1999 (PDF) (Report). Winnipeg: Elections Manitoba.

=== 1973 ===
1973 Manitoba general election
Party	Candidate	Votes	%	±%
New Democratic	Leonard Evans	4,123	51.74	2.72
Progressive Conservative	Kenneth John Burgess	2,912	36.55	4.86
Liberal	Terence "Terry" Penton	855	10.73	-8.56
Social Credit	John William Gross	78	0.98	–
Total valid votes		7,968	–	–
Rejected		48	–	
Eligible voters / Turnout		11,037	72.63	10.81
Source(s) Source: Manitoba. Chief Electoral Officer (1999). Statement of Votes for the 37th Provincial General Election, September 21, 1999 (PDF) (Report). Winnipeg: Elections Manitoba.

=== 1969 ===
1969 Manitoba general election
Party	Candidate	Votes	%	±%
New Democratic	Leonard Evans	3,035	49.02	–
Progressive Conservative	Emily Lyons	1,962	31.69	–
Liberal	Don Martin	1,194	19.29	–
Total valid votes		6,191	–	–
Rejected		34	–	
Eligible voters / Turnout		10,069	61.82	–
Source(s) Source: Manitoba. Chief Electoral Officer (1999). Statement of Votes for the 37th Provincial General Election, September 21, 1999 (PDF) (Report). Winnipeg: Elections Manitoba.

=== 1888 by-election ===
Manitoba provincial by-election, February 9, 1888
Party	Candidate	Votes	%	±%
Liberal	James A. Smart		0.00	–
Total valid votes			–	–
Rejected		N/A	–	
Eligible voters / Turnout		N/A	–	–
Source(s) Source: Manitoba. Chief Electoral Officer (1999). Statement of Votes for the 37th Provincial General Election, September 21, 1999 (PDF) (Report). Winnipeg: Elections Manitoba.

=== 1886 ===
1886 Manitoba general election
Party	Candidate	Votes	%
Liberal	James A. Smart	580	52.68
Conservative	George Winters	521	47.32
Total valid votes		1,101	–
Rejected		N/A	–
Eligible voters / Turnout		1,884	58.44
Source(s) Source: Manitoba. Chief Electoral Officer (1999). Statement of Votes for the 37th Provincial General Election, September 21, 1999 (PDF) (Report). Winnipeg: Elections Manitoba.

== See also ==
- List of Manitoba provincial electoral districts
- Canadian provincial electoral districts
