= Bear (comics) =

Comic book written by Jamie Smart

Publication information
- Format: Ongoing series
- Genre: Black comedy Surreal humour
- Publication date: 2003 -2005

Creative team
- Written by: Jamie Smart
- Artist: Jamie Smart

Bear is a popular black and white alternative comic book created by British writer/artist Jamie Smart and published in the United States by Slave Labor Graphics. It follows the adventures of a small stuffed bear named Bear and his roommate/antagonist, a psychotic housecat named Looshkin. Looshkin often plays cruel, sadistic, and nonsensical pranks on Bear, and it is not uncommon for faeces and dismemberment to come into play.

Smart's linework is bold and expressive, and his panels are littered with information and throw-away gags. The stories are marked by a combination of violent shocks, random silliness, and other hallmarks of Dada.

10 issues were published between 2003 and 2005. Smart would later revive the characters of Bear and Looshkin for the children's comic The Phoenix, with Looshkin as the titular character. The Looshkin comic doesn't feature the dark humour seen in Bear, instead the comic focuses on a slapstick comedy approach.

== Characters ==
=== Bear ===
The foil and victim to Looshkin's insanity, Bear is a stuffed animal standing twelve inches tall. Apparently, he has served in the British Army in a great number of wars (ex: World War I). When you poke his nose his head expands, much to his dismay and Looshkin's joy. He hopes that one day Looshkin will die so he will be able to live his life reading books and slowly becoming an alcoholic.

Bear is known to date human women, much to Karl's surprise, and he spends a good deal of his time fantasizing about being a ladies' man or a gentleman in a Jane Austen novel.

=== Looshkin ===
Looshkin is depicted as a mentally disturbed cat who has a blue pelt. He has large, sharply pointed ears that look like party hats. He is a bipedal creature with opposable thumbs that make him able to pick up objects, much to the displeasure of others. His activities usually consist of senseless babblings and innumerable sadistic acts on people, chiefly his housemate Bear, or whoever is closest when he gets his hands on a likely weapon. He is a humorous character (in the sense of black humor) by some of the things he says or the original comical scenes he'll inflict, such as pretending to be a "gangsta" and speaking fluent slang that he picked up from "hood movies" while going by the name LZ. He is maniacal and merciless, and most readers assume that the reason for that is that he has a mental disorder. Karl, Looshkin's hapless bachelor owner, thinks Looshkin is just lonely and needs a female cat to play with, but the traumatized Bear vehemently disagrees.

Looshkin appeared in the first Bear comic, in which he had unwittingly forgotten stowing Karl's previous pet dog Marmalade in a closet to protect him from evil bats in the laundry room. As a result, a few days later, Marmalade suffocated and died head-down. However Bear reminds us that Karl's home does not have a laundry room. Looshkin has also been known to have a very vivid imagination, but all of the things he says or does come from his suspected dementia. Looshkin has thought of cloning Bear with a kit that will give him an endless supply of Bear clones on which to waste his days torturing and killing; in Looshkin's words, "I am making my own army of Bear fodder!!" In another episode he believed a giant squid that he brought home was a tiger.

One of Looshkin's absolute favorite activities is playing with animal carcasses, especially if Bear is around to stuff in them. He also enjoys the black arts, and he often attempts to do horrible things to Bear by casting spells on him or making look alike Bears to annoy, maim, and/or kill. Looshkin is known to buy dangerous items and weapons off the Internet (which he also uses to find cat porn) and run up Karl's credit card bills.

=== Karl ===
Karl is Looshkin and Bear's owner. Whenever Looshkin starts causing trouble Karl leaves for "work." Karl rarely takes action against Looshkin's attacks on Bear, arguably because he too is afraid of Looshkin to a certain extent.

Flashbacks in later Bear comics show that Karl had a difficult childhood and may have been responsible for the death of his uncle. Karl works in a CD store and has strong opinions about music and cultural stereotypes. He likes to go to clubs and on occasion brings Bear and Looshkin with him. Bear is Karl's best friend, and they sometimes have serious discussions although both have acknowledged a distaste for doing so. Karl hasn't had much luck with women, which is partially Looshkin's fault.
