= James Smart (civil servant) =

Canadian civil servant (1888–1957)

James Smart (February 29, 1888 – July 21, 1957) was a Canadian civil servant. He was the first superintendent for Riding Mountain National Park and was head of the National Parks Branch from 1941 to 1953.

== Biography ==
James Smart was born in Brandon, Manitoba, the son of James A. Smart and Elizabeth Jones, and received a degree in forestry from the University of New Brunswick in 1917. Smart married Katherine Amelia Stewart in 1919. He first worked for the Dominion Forest Service and then joined the National Parks Branch in 1930. He served overseas with the Canadian Forestry Corps during World War I. Smart served as Controller of the federal Department of Mines and Resources and as Controller of the National Parks Branch from 1941 until 1950 and as Director of the National Parks Branch from 1950 until he retired from the civil service in 1953. He was responsible for the establishment of a number of national parks, including Riding Mountain and Fundy National Park. During his tenure, campgrounds were expanded in the parks located in the Canadian national parks in the Rocky Mountains, skiing facilities were improved in Banff National Park, Jasper National Park and Mount Revelstoke National Park and golf courses were developed in three national parks in Atlantic Canada. Also, construction began on the Trans-Canada Highway through Banff National Park.

In 1946, Smart was made an Additional Officer of the Civil Division of the Order of the British Empire.

In 1956, he was named an executive commissioner of the St. Lawrence Development Commission, responsible for parks and recreation development in the St. Lawrence area of Ontario. Smart also was responsible for researching and planning the relocation of gravestones and remains from cemeteries in Ontario that would be flooded by the creation of the Saint Lawrence Seaway.

He died in Winchester, Ontario at the age of 73.
