= Jamie Smart (author) =

British speakerand writer (born 20th century

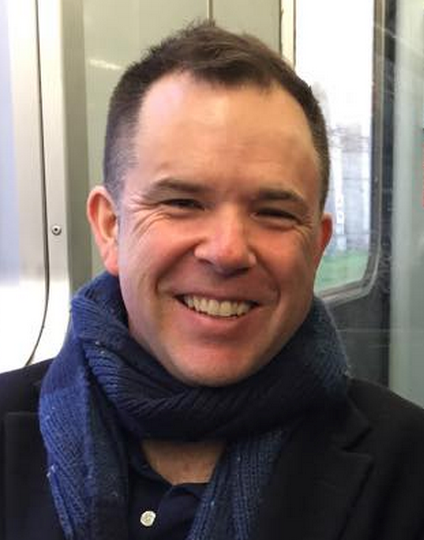
- Born: 20th century
- Occupation(s): Speaker, writer
- Notable work: Clarity: Clear Mind, Better Performance, Bigger Results) (2013)
- Website: jamiesmart.com

Jamie Smart (born 20th century) is a British speaker and writer.

He is known for writing Clarity: Clear Mind, Better Performance, Bigger Results, a 2013 book about achieving mental clarity. In 2015, he published his second book, Little Book of Clarity: A Quick Guide to Focus and Declutter Your Mind.

== Career ==
Smart grew up in an alcoholic household and started drinking by the age of 12. In his early 30s, he decided to stop drinking, but found himself left with a thinking problem leading to stress and depression. He became curious about how the mind works, started exploring positive psychology and created a company called Salad in 2003 creating education programs. He sold the business in 2012.

== Bibliography ==
=== Clarity: Clear Mind, Better Performance, Bigger Results ===
In 2013, Smart published his first book Clarity: Clear Mind, Better Performance, Bigger Results. The book discusses the use of implication-based learning for achieving mental clarity. Smart suggests that mind has its own "self-clearing" capacity. In the book, he writes about the misperception that circumstances are responsible for feelings. He refers to "clarity of understanding" as the recognition that feelings are always and only caused by moment to moment thinking.

In May 2013, after Liverpool F.C. striker Daniel Sturridge scored a hat trick against Fulham, in his post-match interview, he walked in holding a copy of Clarity. The Financial Times wrote about the book that, "Unlike some self-help books Clarity feels like a gentle pep talk rather than a military boot camp. It guides you along the way rather than asking you to set out specific goals within strict time frames. Worth a read." The PA Life magazine gave the book a positive review saying, "broken down into clear chapters that take you on a pathway to clarity and guide you in making changes as you move forward."

=== Little Book of Clarity ===
Smart released his second book, titled Little Book of Clarity: A Quick Guide to Focus and Declutter Your Mind in March 2015. The book features tips to clear the mind and get things done.

== See also ==
- List of British writers
- List of non-fiction writers
