= James Smart (journalist) =

Kenyan journalist and news anchor

- Born: Nairobi
- Education: MA in International Journalism
- Alma mater: Cardiff University
- Occupation: Journalist,
- Notable work: The Trend, News Sources, #CaseNumberZero (Podcast)
- Website: www.jamesmart.co.ke

James Obuye Smart is a Kenyan journalist and news anchor currently working for Nation Television Networks. He has worked for other major networks like Capital FM Kenya and KTN. He pioneered the popular show on NTV called ‘The Trend’. After he left NTV, Larry Madowo took over.

== Early life and education ==
James Smart grew up in Korogocho Slums. He went to St Paul's Lugari High School. He holds an MA in International Journalism from Cardiff University

== Career ==
James, initially worked as a sports journalist at Capital FM Kenya before moving to television as a news anchor and reporter at NTV (Kenya). Most recently, he has collaborated with the BBC to create its "Focus on Africa" broadcast, a flagship TV news program that highlights stories from across the African continent.

He is now the lead news editor at NTV and he hosts a show alongside

== Personal life ==
He is married and has sons.
