= The Adventures of Freddy Lombard =

Comic book series

- The first album of the series

Publication information
- Publisher: Magic Strip; Les Humanoïdes Associés
- Main character(s): Freddy Lombard; Dina; Sweep

Creative team
- Created by: Yves Chaland
- Written by: Yves Chaland with Yann
- Artist: Yves Chaland
- Colorist: Isabelle Beaumenay Joannet

The Adventures of Freddy Lombard is a comic book series created by Yves Chaland. Five albums were released, all during the 1980s, before Chaland's untimely death. They were originally written in French, though have since received publication into English.

The stories feature the protagonist Freddy Lombard and his friends Dina and Sweep, as they desperately try to get money to pay their bills. This often leads them to their adventures.

== Bibliography ==
=== The Will of Godfrey of Bouillon ===
Originally published in 1981 as Le Testament de Godefroid de Bouillon by Magic Strip publishers. In the story, the gang help discover the missing treasure of a drunken aristocrat's ancestor.

=== The Elephant Graveyard ===
Published in 1984 as Le cimetières des éléphants, by Les Humanoïdes Associés. Containing two stories: An African Adventure, about travels to the jungles of Africa in search of a unique photographic plate for a collector. The second story, The Elephants Graveyard, involves Freddy's investigations into the murders of several ex-army gentlemen who served in Africa.

=== The Comet of Carthage ===
Initially published in 1986 as La comète de Carthage, by Les Humanoïdes Associés. A reworking of an ancient story, Freddy insists on saving a Phoenician princess who has been kidnapped by a crazed artist who murdered his last model.

=== Holiday in Budapest ===
Vacances à Budapest (Holiday in Budapest) 1988, Les Humanoïdes Associés

=== F.52 ===
F. 52, 1989, Les Humanoïdes Associés

The final album, F.52 (1989)

== Publication in English ==
The Adventures of Freddy Lombard are the only works by Chaland to be released in English. They were released in two compilation albums, the first containing the first three books, and the second containing the last two. They were released in hardback in 2003 and softback in 2004 and 2005. In 2015, Humanoids published the entire collection in one hardbound volume.

== See also ==
- Yves Chaland
- Ligne claire
