= Association of Manitoba Municipalities =

- Formation: January 1, 1999; 27 years ago
- Merger of: Union of Manitoba Municipalities (1905-99); Manitoba Association of Urban Municipalities (1949-99)
- Subsidiaries: AMM Trading Company
- Website: amm.mb.ca

The Association of Manitoba Municipalities (AMM) is an organization of municipal governments in the province of Manitoba, Canada. All incorporated municipalities in Manitoba are members.

Its stated purpose is to "identify and address the needs and concerns of [its] members to achieve strong and effective municipal government."

The AMM is funded solely by its members and by its business arm, the AMM Trading Company.

== History ==
The Union of Manitoba Municipalities was created in 1905. By 1910, the UMM would grow to a little over 100 members.

== Structure ==
All 137 incorporated municipalities in Manitoba are members of the AMM, as represented by their mayors, reeves, and councillors. The AMM comprises seven districts, each with two directors: Parkland, Interlake, Midwestern, Central, Western, Eastern, and Northern. The City of Winnipeg is also represented by one Director.

AMM and representatives from Manitoba serve on the Federation of Canadian Municipalities Board of Directors.

The AMM also offers associate non-voting memberships to First Nations, other communities, school boards, hospital boards, and other associations. The following are some of the current AMM Associate Members, as of 2023:

- Incorporated Community of Cross Lake
- Manitoba Association of Watersheds
- Nelson House Community Council
- Pembina Valley Watershed District
- Red River Basin Commission
- Seymourville Community Council
- Winnipeg Metropolitan Region

Limited Associate Members, as of 2023:

- Buffalo Point First Nation
- Flin Flon School Division
- Fort La Bosse School Division
- Frontier School Division
- Lakeshore School Division
- Mountain View School Division
- Park West School Division
- Portage la Prairie Regional Landfill
- Prairie Rose School Division
- South Interlake Regional Library
- Swan Valley School Division
- Thompson Airport

== See also ==
- List of municipalities in Manitoba
- List of micro-regional organizations
