= Yves Chaland =

French cartoonist

- Born: 3 April 1957 Lyon, Rhône, France
- Died: 18 July 1990 (aged 33) Paris, France
- Areas: artist, writer
- Notable works: Bob Fish; Adolphus Claar; Freddy Lombard
- Awards: full list

Yves Chaland (French: [iv ʃalɑ̃]; 3 April 1957 – 18 July 1990) was a French cartoonist.

During the 1980s, together with Luc Cornillon, Serge Clerc and Floc'h, he launched the Atomic style, a stylish remake of the Marcinelle School in Franco-Belgian comics.

== Biography ==
Chaland's "Retro-Spirou" in Les aventures de Spirou (1982)

Yves Chaland was born in Lyon on 3 April 1957 to Jean-Marie Chaland and Marie-Thérèse Chapolard.

Chaland published his first strips in the fanzine Biblipop when he was 17. During his studies at the Ecole des Beaux-Arts, Saint-Etienne, he created his own fanzine, L'Unité de Valeur, in 1976, with Luc Cornillon.

In 1978, they met writer/editor Jean-Pierre Dionnet who hired them for his comics magazines Métal Hurlant and Ah Nana. These pastiches of 50s comics have been collected in the album Captivant. In September 1979 he married designer Isabelle Beaumenay-Joannet.

He then created the characters of Bob Fish, Adolphus Claar, Freddy Lombard, and Le Jeune Albert, a scamp character living in the Marolles, a working-class area of Brussels. Yves Chaland, was approached to draw an adventure of Spirou et Fantasio, appearinging in half-page installments of the weekly Spirou magazine. Done in a retro 50s style similar to his influences Jijé and André Franquin, both former artists on the Spirou feature. The unfinished story has been collected in the album Spirou et Fantasio – Hors Série, No. 4 (Dupuis, 2003).

He also did many advertising illustration commissions in his crisp, clean, "retro-modern" cartoon style.

Chaland died on 18 July 1990, following a car wreck, at the age of 33.

== Books published in English ==
As with many Franco-Belgian comics, Chaland's works have had limited publication in English. The complete Freddy Lombard series was released in the two volume Chaland Anthology. These were the only two released in English (in both paper and hardback, in 2003), while 4 volumes were released in French, containing his complete comic strip works for Métal Hurlant. (Chaland – L'Intégrale).

A Magazine contribute to the knowledge of Chaland's artwork, The Journal of Freddy's friends is also available in English.

- Le Journal des Amis de Freddy #1, editing by Club des Amis de Freddy in 2008, #2 in 2010, #3 in 2012.

== Partial bibliography ==
Cover of Spirou, April 1982, by Chaland

- Captivant 1st ed. 1979
- Bob Fish 1st ed. 1981
- Adolphus Claar 1st ed. 1982
- John Bravo pre-publication in Astrapi in 1983
- The Adventures of Freddy Lombard
1. The Will of Godfrey of Bouillon (Le Testament de Godefroid de Bouillon) 1st ed. 1981
2. The Elephant Graveyard (Le Cimetière des éléphants)1st ed. 1984
3. The Comet of Carthage (La Comète de Carthage) 1st ed. 1986
4. Holiday in Budapest (Vacances à Budapest) 1st ed. 1988
5. F-52 1st ed. 1990
- Le Jeune Albert 1st ed. 1985

== Awards ==
- 1982 : Best Comic at the Prix Saint-Michel, Belgium
- 1984 : Betty Boop of the best comics of the year for The Elephant Graveyard in Hyères
