= The Phoenix (comics) =

British weekly story comic for children

- Issue 1 cover art featuring "Pirates of Pangaea" by Neill Cameron, 7 January 2012

Publication information
- Publisher: David Fickling Comics Ltd
- Schedule: Weekly
- Format: Weekly Story Comic
- Publication date: 7 January 2012–present
- No. of issues: 750

Creative team
- Written by: Jamie Smart, Neil Cameron, Gary Northfield, etc.
- Artist(s): Jamie Smart, Robert Deas, Adam Murphy, etc.
- Penciller(s): Jamie Smart, Gary Northfield, etc.

The Phoenix is a British weekly story comic magazine for children aged 7– 14, published by David Fickling Comics Ltd. The magazine was launched on 7 January 2012 with a preview issue which was released in late 2011. The comic is often considered a successor to The DFC: both are published by the same people and many of The Phoenix's creators had worked on The DFC.

== Content of the magazine ==
Unlike other British children's comic magazines, such as The Beano and The Dandy, the magazine does not exclusively feature humour strips. It also features serialised adventure stories such as "The Lost Boy", "Pirates of Pangaea" and "The Island With No Name", as well as humour strips such as Star Cat, 'Donut Squad', Evil Emperor Penguin, "Looshkin" and "Bunny vs Monkey". The magazine features text stories (such as extracts from books like Charlie Small and Julius Zebra) and puzzles (which are also present in both the modern Beano and The Dandy). This makes The Phoenix more similar to the older Beano and Dandy than the modern ones as they once had a mixture of adventure and humour strips as well as text stories. There is also a non-fiction strip called Corpse Talk where the creator Adam Murphy interviews famous dead persons about their life. In 2022, Corpse Talk was adapted into an online webseries produced by Tiger Aspect.

The Phoenix also has a feature called "Star in a Comic". Each year, readers are encouraged to send in ideas for a new strip, and the winner gets their comic running in The Phoenix for about 3 weeks, written and illustrated by a Phoenix author, while the runner-ups get their ideas featured in the magazine. There are several other similar contests as well, normally as a tie-in to a book or Phoenix strip.

There is also Team Donut and Team Bagel, where the Donut Squad (issue 569) and Bagel Battalion (issue 603) Fight. The first epic battle was in issue 614, when the Donuts banished the Bagels. The second was in issue 668, when the Bagels chucked the Donuts into the Void. The third was in issue 675, when the Donuts chucked the Bagels into the Void. The fourth was in issue 720, when the Bagels sent the Donuts out of the comic, onto the back of the envelope that The Phoenix comes in. They got back in issue 723, where Sprinkles declared The Ultimate Challenge (724–726). Starting with the Doughlympics, as we saw in Brian and Timmy, the score is Donuts:4 Bagels:28. However, the competition could be turned completely on its head. In the next issue, they had a more arts-related challenge, where the donuts won, leaving the scores equal. In the third one, they had a singing contest because Spronky wrote a musical over the plans, and the donuts ended up winning. Platoon Commander Poppyseed let loose robotic tentacles all over the Phoenix in the next issue, affecting other comics like Bunny vs Monkey, Ninja vs Ninja, and Ask The Dunnos. In the end, the tentacles were defeated and the Donuts and Bagels stopped fighting and agreed on peace. Then Bagel Battalion went to the last page of the comic and have a strip there. Donut Squad is still 2 pages. There are 2 books in the Donut Squad series.

== Strips ==
Like a number of comic magazines (2000AD has Tharg the Mighty and Sparky had the Sparky People), The Phoenix features a fictional editorial team, a group of cartoon animals led by feline editor-in-chief Tabitha Inkspot. The main news reporters that are Bruno Barker, Ellie Waggins, Scoop Yapski and Iris Hasselblad, who have a big news page where they report on new comics, fictional news and other (real) information of note. There is also Chops Piggerton, the pig who is obsessed with turnips. The other strips include:

- Bunny vs. Monkey by Jamie Smart – A strip about the adventures of anthropomorphic woodland animals, centered around a long-suffering bunny and a mischievous monkey, and many other woodland animals, such as a pig, a squirrel and a skunk.
- Tamsin and the Days by Neill Cameron & Kate Brown – A recurring strip starring Tamsin, an unknowingly magical girl who is the last pillar, a chosen one to save the world from darkness. Has since been discontinued.
- Troy Trailblazer (now Trailblazers) by Robert Deas – A recurring sci-fi adventure comic strip starring a team of space heroes led by Troy, their cocky but brave captain. Has since been discontinued after the strip ended.
- Gary's Garden by Gary Northfield – A strip about a garden and the whimsical animals and plants in it. Since discontinued.
- Star Cat by James Turner – A sci-fi strip about a spaceship crew who live inside an interstellar cat.
- Corpse Talk by Adam Murphy - A spoof talk show looking at influential historical people such as Albert Einstein, Boudicca, Isaac Newton, etc. by digging up their skeletons. Now a popular series of kids YouTube videos.
- Doug Slugman by Joe List – A comic strip about a surrealist mollusc sleuth.
- Evil Emperor Penguin Or EEP by Laura Ellen Anderson – A comic about a penguin and his plans for world domination, with schemes that always are ridiculous, and always fail.
- Mega Robo Bros – A comic by Neill Cameron about two robot brothers on a distant future Earth. Has since been discontinued after the strip ended.
- Squid Squad – An underwater adventure strip featuring a team of 3 squids protecting the ocean from multiple threats. Since discontinued.
- Squid Bits by Jess Bradley – A simple strip of (usually, as sometimes they all follow a particular theme) unrelated short cartoons. Has recurring characters like a humanoid banana, (named Banana) a cat obsessed with gravy, and a red panda, who is supposedly nature's jerk.
- Looshkin by Jamie Smart – The adventures of "the maddest cat in the world", based around a crazy blue cat, who had previously appeared in Bear. In 2022, a spin-off series, King Looshkin, was also created.
- POW! – A purely illustrative comic with no text. Follows the adventures of POW!, a space gladiator and his adventures. Since discontinued.
- Dirk Lloyd by Jamie Thomson – A comic strip adapted from the Dark Lord series. A Dark Lord is transformed into a 13-year-old boy and we follow his adventures as he tries to turn himself back. Since discontinued.
- The Dangerous Adventures of Von Doogan by the Etherington Brothers - The puzzle usually on the back or middle page of The Phoenix. Children are encouraged to send in the answers to receive a Von Doogan prize and to be named winner in the next issue. Since discontinued.
- Izzy Newton by Joe Brady & Robert Deas – Featuring child genius billionaire Izzy Newton trying to make the world a much better place. Since ended and discontinued.
- Claire, Justice Ninja: Ninja of Justice by Joe Brady & Kate Ashwin – Claire and hapless sidekick Nigel right everyday household wrongs such as littering or leaving the fridge open. Appears to have been discontinued.
- I Hate Pixies (Now: Toby and The Pixies) by James Turner & Andreas Schuster – Accidental pixie king Toby gets into multiple strange pixie-related scrapes with his unusual citizens.
- The Boss – The Boss and his fellow students at Lockwood Academy foil the plans of criminals. Since ended and discontinued.
- Megalomaniacs by Jamie Smart - A strip about tiny aliens fighting each other for control of Earth. The strip previously ran in The Dandy and stars Megalomaniac 0002: Lord Skull. It bears a similarity to Pokémon.
- Gorebrah by Joe Brady. A barbarian chef embarks on unusual food-related journeys in order to become the "greatest chef in the universe".
- Fawn by Robert Deas - A comic about an "earth whisperer", named Fawn, who lost her mother at an early age, and can talk to and magically "connect" with creatures.
- Thingamajigs by Daniel and Emily Kimbell - A strip about a boy called Nolan who lives in a town where all the objects are sentient.
- Fish-Head Steve by Jamie Smart - A strip that originally appeared in The DFC about a town of people who mysteriously change their heads into objects like a fish or a loaf of bread.
- Tosh's Island - About a girl diagnosed with Still's Disease who uses her imagination to make her world a little more exciting. Since ended and discontinued.
- Earth Protection Force - About four friends who try to put aliens where they're supposed to be.
- The Island With No Name - about a boy and dog who discovers an undiscovered island
- The Villinoos - Strip by Neill Cameron and Logan Cameron about Lord Villinoo and his clone Neville, who keeps calling Lord Villinoos "dad".
- Hero Slam - Comic by Jamie Smart about heroes and their adventures. First Phoenix comic to be made into a card game.
- The Lovely Pirates - Comic starring Captain Purplebeard as they make adventures through the seas

== The Shorts ==
A collection of short comic strips including “Susie and Brad” and “Tooth and Claw Academy for Magical Creatures”. They are a relatively recent addition to the comic. Some of 'The Shorts' strips include:

- Susie and Brad - About two sloths and their friends. (Susie and Brad sometimes appear in larger 3 page strips)
- Tooth and Claw Academy for Magical Creatures - About a boarding school that teaches animals magic. Sometimes a one to two page strip.
- Doggo - About a dog that ends up in unusual situations.
- Clatters and Bump - About a ghost and a skeleton who haunt a castle.
- Duck Dare - A duck that is anthropomorphic who gets into kooky accidents while fighting crime. Appears to have been discontinued.
- Bagel Battalion - A short made to rival Donut Squad.
- The Land Of Noj - A Paradox like comic featuring blue eyeball creature named Noj. It was a full one page strip for a while, featuring Noj's adventures through the multiverse, but has since been discontinued.
- Tina Is Never On Time! - About a girl named Tina who is always trying to be early to school but never makes it on time.
- Brian and Timmy - Donut + Bagel News show/comic where Brian the Bagel and Timmy the Donut do News reports together. Appears to have been discontinued

Some regular comics also appear as shorts sometimes.

== Events ==
- Phoenix Fest - A yearly event where fans can meet artists and learn how to draw, you can participate online or in person.
- Phoenix Digital Workshops - There have been many different workshops where you can meet artists, draw with them and, make suggestions.
- Star In A comic! - A competition held yearly for readers to send in heroes and villains for a chance for their ideas to be made into a comic illustrated by a Phoenix artist.
- Thought Bubble - The Phoenix sometimes goes to Thought Bubble, where they do workshops with Phoenix artists

== See also ==
- The Dandy
- The Beano
- Jamie Smart
- Neill Cameron
