= List of Beano comic strips by annual =

These lists show the comic strips that are contained within each Beano Annual.

== The Beano Book 1940 ==
=== Comics ===
- Big Eggo
- Pansy Potter
- Good King Coke
- Rip Van Wink
- Tin Can Tommy
- Ping the Elastic Man
- The Pranks of Hicky the Hare
- Lord Snooty and his Pals
- Wee Peem
- Brave Captain Kipper
- Whoopee Hank the Slap Dash Sheriff
- Hooky's Magic Bowler Hat
- Ho Lummy
- Tricky Dicky Ant
- Benny Blowhard
- Dingo the Doggie
- Boss and Bert
- Rupert the Rabbit
- Frosty McNab
- Podge (Appeared in The Dandy)
- Helpful Henry
- Hard-Nut the Nigger
- Smiler the Sweeper
- Little Dead Eye Dick
- Puffing Billy
- Monkey Tricks
- Marmaduke Mean the Miser

=== Picture stories ===
- Wild Boy of the Woods
- In the Land of the Silver Dwarfs

=== Text stories ===
- Tom Thumb to the Rescue
- The Wishing Tree
- 12 Happy Horners
- Baldy wins his freedom
- Teacher Takes a Licking
- The Flying Horse
- Cripple Charlie
- Black Flash the Beaver
- The Singing Giant

== The Beano Book 1941 ==
=== Comics ===
- Big Eggo
- Lord Snooty and his Pals
- Pansy Potter
- Hooky's Magic Bowler Hat
- Deep-Down Daddy Neptune
- Tough Nellie Duff
- Contrary Mary
- Puffing Billy
- Rip Van Wink
- Tin-Can Tommy
- Tricky Dicky Ant
- Dingo the Doggie
- Ping the Elastic Man
- Wee Peem
- Cocky Dick
- Winken and Blinken
- Frosty McNab
- Good King Coke
- Roland Ham
- Hairy Dan
- Boss and Bert
- Wily Willie Winkie
- Brainy Bill

=== Picture Stories ===
- Wild Boy of the Woods
- Prince on the Flying Horse

=== Text Stories ===
- The Little Joker in the Land of Nod
- Terrible Joe Jenners
- Sir Tom Thumb
- A Man on the Moon
- Stephen's Speed Boots
- The Boy with the Magic Mask
- Young Strong-Arm the Axeman
- Orphan Jim and Jacko
- Jack Sprat's Battle Cat
- Keeper of the Crooked Cross

== The Beano Book 1953 ==
=== Comics ===
- Biffo the Bear
- Pansy Potter
- Have-a-go Joe
- Wee Peem's Magic Pills
- Postie Hastie
- Dennis the Menace
- Willie's Wonder Gun
- Skinny Flint
- Ding-Dong Belle
- Maxy's Taxi
- Sammy's Super Rubber
- The Magic Lollipops
- Race to The Moon (a snakes and ladders style game featuring a load of Beano characters)
- Bucktooth
- Jack Flash and the Terrible Twins
- Lord Snooty
- Jimmy and his Magic Patch
- The Iron Fish
- The Tricks of Tom Thumb
- Hawk-Eye Bravest of the Braves
- Sinbad the Sailor
- Tick-Tock Tony (This strip was another name for a horse that Jack Built)
- The Wily Ways of Simple Simon

=== Text Stories ===
- The Clockwork Cop
- The Bird Boy
- Smarty Smokey
- Jack of Clubs
- Waltzing Matilda
- The Wangles of Granny Green
- Ginger's Magic Ear

== The Beano Book 1955 ==
=== Comics ===
- Biffo the Bear
- Pansy Potter
- Uncle Windbag
- Kat and Kanary
- Goggo the Goldfish
- Roger the Dodger
- Charlie Choo
- Big Hugh and You
- Dennis the Menace
- Black Bun
- Lord Snooty
- The Invisible Giant
- Nobby the Bobby
- Wee Davie
- Big Bazooka - It's about an ostrich
- Red Rory of the Eagles
- Young Robin Hood

=== Text Stories ===
- Cast-Iron Stan
- The Magic Bottle
- Catapult Jack
- Nutty the Coal Imp
- Smarty Smokey
- Mickey's Magic Bone

== The Beano Book 1982 ==
- Dennis the Menace and Gnasher
- The 3 Bears
- The Bash Street Kids
- Lord Snooty
- Roger the Dodger
- Pup Parade
- Billy Whizz
- Tom, Dick and Sally
- Biffo the Bear
- The Nibblers
- Little Plum
- Ball Boy
- Grandpa
- Minnie the Minx
- Baby Face Finlayson
- Smudge
- Gnasher's Tale

== The Beano Book 1984 ==
- Dennis the Menace and Gnasher
- The Bash Street Kids
- Roger the Dodger
- The 3 Bears
- Minnie the Minx
- Gnasher's Tale
- Smudge
- Pup Parade
- Little Plum
- Rasher Fashions
- Billy Whizz
- In The Army
- Biffo the Bear
- Grandpa
- Out of This World
- The Nibblers
- Tom, Dick and Sally
- Lord Snooty
- Ball Boy
- Baby Face Finlayson

== The Beano Book 1986 ==
- Minnie the Minx
- Pepper the Pony and Lucinda
- Gnasher's Tale
- Roger the Dodger
- The Bash Street Kids
- Smudge
- Tom, Dick and Sally
- The 3 Bears
- Little Plum
- Billy Whizz
- Pup Parade
- Lord Snooty
- Ball Boy
- Dennis the Menace and Gnasher
- Rasher
- Baby Face Finlayson
- Biffo the Bear

== The Beano Book 1987 ==
- Dennis the Menace and Gnasher
- Smudge
- Tom, Dick and Sally
- Ivy the Terrible
- Gnasher's Tale
- Roger the Dodger
- Billy Whizz
- Minnie the Minx
- Ball Boy
- Lord Snooty
- Pup Parade
- Baby Face Finlayson
- Biffo the Bear
- The Bash Street Kids
- Little Monkey
- Simply Smiffy
- Rasher
- Little Plum

== The Beano Book 1999 ==
- Dennis the Menace and Gnasher
- The Three Bears
- Minnie the Minx
- Ball Boy
- General Jumbo
- Billy Whizz
- The Bash Street Kids
- Crazy for Daisy
- Roger the Dodger
- Vic Volcano
- Ivy the Terrible
- Gnasher and Gnipper
- Joe King
- Camp Cosmos
- Biffo the Bear
- Calamity James
- Go, Granny, Go!
- Les Pretend

=== Other 'Strips' ===
- It's A Bear's Life
- If I Had My Own Annual
- What To Do With A Sleeping Dad!
- Where Do The Numskulls Go On Holiday?
- When They Get Married
- Les Pretend's DAFTAS
- It Happens Once A Year...!

== The Beano Annuals from 2000 - 2009 ==
| Comic Strip | 2000 | 2001 | 2002 | 2003 | 2004 | 2005 | 2006 | 2007 | 2008 | 2009 | Duration |
|---|---|---|---|---|---|---|---|---|---|---|---|
| Ball Boy | Yes | Yes | Yes | Yes | Yes | Yes | Yes | ? | Yes | | 2000 - 2008 |
| The Bash Street Kids | Yes | Yes | Yes | Yes | Yes | Yes | Yes | ? | Yes | Yes | 2000 - 2009 |
| Beaginnings / Bea | Yes | Yes | Yes | Yes | Yes | Yes | Yes | ? | Yes | Yes | 2000 - 2009 |
| Biffo the Bear | Yes | | | | | | | ? | | | 2000 |
| Billy Whizz | Yes | Yes | Yes | Yes | Yes | Yes | Yes | ? | Yes | Yes | 2000 - 2009 |
| Calamity James | Yes | Yes | Yes | Yes | Yes | Yes | Yes | ? | Yes | | 2000 - 2008 |
| Crazy for Daisy | Yes | Yes | Yes | Yes | Yes | Yes | Yes | ? | Yes | | 2000 - 2008 |
| Dennis the Menace and Gnasher | Yes | Yes | Yes | Yes | Yes | Yes | Yes | ? | Yes | Yes | 2000 - 2009 |
| Even Steven | Yes | | | | | | | ? | | | 2000 |
| General Jumbo | Yes | Yes | Yes | Yes | Yes | Yes | Yes | ? | Yes | Yes | 2000 - 2009 |
| Gnasher and Gnipper / Gnasher | Yes | Yes | Yes | Yes | Yes | Yes | Yes | ? | Yes | Yes | 2000 - 2009 |
| Ivy the Terrible | Yes | Yes | Yes | Yes | Yes | Yes | Yes | ? | Yes | Yes | 2000 - 2009 |
| Joe King | Yes | Yes | Yes | | | | | ? | | | 2000 - 2002 |
| Les Pretend | Yes | Yes | Yes | Yes | Yes | | Yes | ? | Yes | | 2000 - 2004, 2006 - 2008 |
| Minnie the Minx | Yes | Yes | Yes | Yes | Yes | Yes | Yes | ? | Yes | Yes | 2000 - 2009 |
| The Numskulls | Yes | Yes | Yes | Yes | Yes | Yes | Yes | ? | Yes | Yes | 2000 - 2009 |
| Roger the Dodger | Yes | Yes | Yes | Yes | Yes | Yes | Yes | ? | Yes | Yes | 2000 - 2009 |
| Tim Traveller | Yes | Yes | Yes | Yes | | Yes | | ? | | | 2000 - 2003, 2005 |
| Dog's Breakfast TV | | Yes | | | | | | ? | | | 2001 |
| Gordon Bennett | | Yes | | | | | | ? | | | 2001 |
| The Three Bears | | Yes | Yes | Yes | Yes | Yes | Yes | ? | Yes | Yes | 2001 - 2009 |
| The Colonel's Journals | | | Yes | Yes | | | | ? | | | 2002 - 2003 |
| Come to Beanotown | | | Yes | Yes | | | | ? | | | 2002 - 2003 |
| Little Larry | | | Yes | | | | | ? | | | 2002 |
| Rasher | | | Yes | | | | | ? | | | 2002 |
| Splodge | | | Yes | | | | | ? | | | 2002 |
| Bash Street Super Kids | | | | Yes | | | | ? | | | 2003 |
| Robbie Rebel | | | | Yes | Yes | Yes | Yes | ? | Yes | | 2003 - 2008 |
| Billy the Cat | | | | | Yes | Yes | Yes | ? | Yes | | 2004 - 2008 |
| Freddie Fear | | | | | Yes | Yes | Yes | ? | Yes | Yes | 2004 - 2009 |
| Good Natured Fun | | | | | Yes | | | ? | | | 2004 |
| Little Plum | | | | | Yes | Yes | Yes | ? | | Yes | 2004 - 2006, 2009 |
| Baby Face Finlayson | | | | | | Yes | Yes | ? | | | 2005 - 2006 |
| Doctor Beastly | | | | | | Yes | | ? | | | 2005 |
| Ricky Grainger | | | | | | Yes | | ? | | | 2005 |
| Colin the Vet | | | | | | | Yes | ? | | | 2006 |
| Derek the Sheep | | | | | | | Yes | ? | Yes | Yes | 2006 - 2009 |
| Joe Jitsu | | | | | | | Yes | ? | | | 2006 |
| The Neds | | | | | | | | ? | Yes | | 2008 |
| Ratz | | | | | | | | ? | Yes | Yes | 2008 - 2009 |
| Fred's Bed | | | | | | | | | | Yes | 2009 |
| Johnny Bean from Happy Bunny Green | | | | | | | | | | Yes | 2009 |
| Nicky Nutjob | | | | | | | | | | Yes | 2009 |
| Pirates of the Caribeano | | | | | | | | | | Yes | 2009 |

== The Beano Annual 2011 ==
- Fred's Bed
- The Bash Street Kids
- Minnie The Minx
- The Numskulls
- Billy Whizz
- Les Pretend
- Freddie Fear
- Dennis the Menace
- Lord Snooty
- Ratz
- Ball Boy
- Beano Wars
- Billy the Cat and Katie
- Fiends Reunited
- Super School
- Ivy the Terrible
- Roger The Dodger
- General Jumbo
- A day in the life of the Beano office

== The Beano Annual 2012 ==
- Dennis the Menace and Gnasher
- Ratz
- The Bash Street Kids
- Ivy the Terrible
- Winston the Bash Street Cat
- Ball Boy
- Lord Snooty the Third
- The Numskulls
- Billy Whizz
- Fred's Bed
- Meebo and Zuky
- Minnie the Minx
- Roger the Dodger
- Super School
- Catastrophe
- Calamity James
- Les Pretend
- The Nibblers
- The Three Bears
- The Bash Street Pups

== The Beano Annual 2013 ==
=== Comics ===
- Dennis the Menace and Gnasher
- Ball Boy
- Meebo and Zuky
- The Numskulls
- Gnasher's Bit(e)
- The Bash Street Kids
- Ratz
- Fred's Bed
- Minnie the Minx
- Billy Whizz
- Bananaman
- Roger the Dodger
- Pup Parade
- Number 13
- Stinking Rich
- Gnasher's Bit(e)

=== Prose stories ===
- Vile Times with Evil Edgar: Potion in the Ocean!

== The Beano Annual 2014 ==
=== Comics ===
- Dennis the Menace and Gnasher
- Ball Boy
- Pup Parade
- Minnie the Minx
- Ratz
- The Numskulls
- Roger the Dodger
- Angel Face
- Gnasher's Bit(e)
- Billy Whizz
- Meebo and Zuky
- Biffo the Bear
- Pansy Potter
- Number 13
- The Three Bears
- Lord Snooty
- Rasher
- Little Plum
- Bananaman

=== Poems ===
- Revolting Rhymes

=== Prose stories ===
Pete's Science Project

== The Beano Annual 2015 ==
=== Comics ===
- Dennis the Menace and Gnasher
- Biffo the Bear
- Calamity James
- The Numskulls
- The Bash Street Kids
- Bananaman
- The Three Bears
- Minnie the Minx
- Billy Whizz
- Roger the Dodger
- Little Plum

=== Funsize Funnies ===
- Rasher
- Pansy Potter
- Pup Parade
- Lord Snooty

== The Beano Annual 2016 ==
=== Comics ===
- Billy Whizz
- Dennis the Menace and Gnasher
- The Bash Street Kids
- Calamity James
- Roger the Dodger
- Biffo the Bear
- The Numskulls
- Bananaman
- Lord Snooty
- Minnie the Minx
- Little Plum
- Pup Parade
- Ball Boy
- Les Pretend
- General Jumbo

=== Prose Stories ===
- Lost in a Good Book

== See also ==
- The Beano
- List of Beano comic strips
- The Dandy
- List of Dandy comic strips
- List of Dandy comic strips by annual
- The Beezer
- List of Beezer comic strips
- List of Beezer and Topper comic strips
