= EPIC Magazine =

British comic magazine

Publication information
- Publisher: D. C. Thomson & Co. Ltd.
- Schedule: Monthly
- Format: Children's
- Genre: Humour anthology
- No. of issues: 151

Creative team as of September 2008
- Artist(s): Nigel Parkinson, Laura Howell, Duncan Scott, David Sutherland, John Geering, Lew Stringer, Mike Pearse, Peter Player, Steve English, Jim Dewar
- Editor(s): Euan Kerr, Alan Digby, Michael Stirling

EPIC Magazine (Previously known as Dennis the Menace and Gnasher's EPIC Magazine (2014–2016), 100% Official Dennis the Menace and Gnasher Megazine (2013–2014) and BeanoMAX (2007–2013)) was a monthly British comic magazine published by D.C. Thomson & Co. Ltd It was originally a spin-off of the UK comic, The Beano. Each issue had 40 pages and costs £3.99.

The first issue was published on 15 February 2007 and was a Comic Relief special. The BeanoMAX title ceased with issue #79 in June 2013, and the following issue #80 was rebranded as 100% Official Dennis the Menace and Gnasher Megazine. It was renamed again to Dennis and Gnasher's EPIC Magazine a year later and was shortened to its current name in 2016. The magazine was discontinued in 2019.

== Strips ==
During the BeanoMAX era, the strips also starred in the weekly Beano. However, some of these started in the weekly, and also starred in BeanoMAX, but ended up being removed from the weekly (still showing sometimes, but only once every few months) and carrying on in the 'MAX, for example, the Neds. There are now only two original strips in the monthly comic which have never appeared in the Beano.

=== Regular strips ===
- Beano All Stars
- Bananaman (reprints)
- Dennis the Menace and Gnasher
- Fight My Monster (moved to weekly Beano)
- Wallace & Gromit (moved to weekly Beano)

=== Previous strips ===
- Auntie Clockwise, from The Dandy, reprints from the early 2000s by Wayne Thompson.
- Baby Face Finlayson
- The Bash Street Kids, drawn by Nigel Parkinson with others by David Sutherland.
- Billy Whizz
- Calamity James, reprints from the early 2000s drawn by Tom Paterson.
- Derek the Sheep
- Doctor Beastly's Tales of the Slightly Unpleasant, reprints from the early 2000s drawn by Brian Walker.
- Football Earth, about Mother Nature playing football, yet another strip never to have featured in the Beano. Commonly known as Soccer Earth.
- Gnasher's Bite
- Kick-Ass Koalas, a BeanoMAX exclusive by Peter Player.
- The Legend of Little Plum, reprints from the 1990s by Tom Paterson.
- Max, the first strip never to have made an appearance in the Beano.
- Meebo and Zuky
- Meebo and Zuky's History of Violence
- Minnie the Minx, sometimes as a reprint.
- The Neds
- The Numskulls
- Roger the Dodger, a special photo strip appeared in December 2008.
- Super School, stock-piled stories from The Beano.
- The 3 Bears, reprints from the 2000s by Mike Pearse.
- Evil Edgar

=== 100% Official Dennis the Menace and Gnasher Megazine Strips ===
- Dennis the Menace and Gnasher
- Pie-Face (moved to weekly Beano)
- The Adventures of Paul the Potato (moved to weekly Beano)
- Angel Face

== Regular features ==
- CSI Beanotown - a half page sharing Bananaman villains' profiles, accompanied with a 2.5-page Bananaman story reprinted from Nutty.
- Gee Whizz - a page about records from Guinness World Records featuring Billy Whizz.
- Gnasher's Deadliest Animals - a double-page spread of dangerous animals with captions from Gnasher.
- W&G Pull-out - an 8-page pull-out about Wallace and Gromit including a three-page comic strip, a page of inventions and a Where's Shaun puzzle page.

== Previous features ==
- The Lowdown - entrance feature. Also includes a contents bar at the side.
- Fashion Victims - A humorous joke about certain people and what they dress like, e.g. goths, nature lovers. Drawn by Duncan Scott, who also draws The Neds.
- The Arcade - Game reviews by 'The Game Hunter'.
- Game Gurus - An extended "Arcade" feature that gives game cheats and hints, by two boys - Jamie and Josh.
- A pull-out poster (occasionally)
- Puzzle pages, with a theme and name having something to do with the issue, for example, the "Wild Creatures" puzzle page is full of animal puzzles, and entitled "Creature Conundrums".
- MAX-imum - 2 pages worth of free prizes, won by telephone calls.
- Subscription offers and Beano Club forms.

== Logos ==
The logo has always been a combination of the old Beano logo (from 1977–1998), slightly updated with the help of computer technology, and a blue, graffito style MAX alongside it. The original logo had the Beano logo as it was on the weekly comic, with the MAX overlapping it slightly at the right. In late 2007, the MAX part of the logo started to grow in size. It was almost twice the height as the Beano logo at one point. In 2008, for 3 issues in the summer, the logo changed so that the MAX was predominant to the Beano logo. Instead of the Beano logo running horizontal, it was now vertical, alongside the MAX which was by now on a diagonal bar. After these three issues, the BeanoMAX logo changed back to the style it had gained in late 2007. In 2009, the logo changed again, with the Beano logo directly above the MAX logo.
