= Meebo and Zuky =

British comic strip

- Comic strip character(s) from The Beano

Publication information
- Current/last artist: Laura Howell
- First appearance: Issue 35XX (June 2010)
- Also appeared in: The Beano Annual

Characters
- Regular characters: Meebo, Zuky

Meebo and Zuky is a comic strip in the British children's comic strip magazine The Beano. It was introduced as one of three new strips in the Beano's Comic Idol competition, in June 2010, where the winner gets a permanent place in the comic. It was up against Home Invasion, about green aliens who want to invade Earth, and Uh, Oh, Si Co!, about a boy who'd get angry at the slightest annoyance. After three weeks of voting, the winner was announced to be Meebo & Zuky, so from the next week they were launched properly. It is drawn by Laura Howell, who has also drawn Beano Manga, Ratz and Johnny Bean from Happy Bunny Green for The Beano.

The strip involves Meebo (a cat) and Zuky (a dog) who fight like cat and dog. The strip shares many characteristics with a number of older DC Thomson comic strips such as Kat and Kanary, from the Beano, and Puss 'n' Boots, from the Sparky. The strips often involve Meebo and Zuky being cruel to one other, usually for no reason or revenge. The strips make use of cartoon violence with cartoon decapitations and dismemberments being common making this strip probably the most violent one that has ever been in The Beano. There have been many complaints about a strip where Meebo kills Zuky and cleans up his remains. Zuky appeared in the next issue. The strip also occasionally parodies film genres and one strip featured Barack Obama. After Freddie Fear disappeared from The Beano in 2011, Meebo and Zuky is currently the only winner of a reader vote running in the Beano. They use a number of weapons to defeat each other, such as clubs, bombs, dynamite, steamrollers, piranhas, sharks, mutant piranha bees, and many others. Sometimes they trick each other into defeat, i.e., in issue 3627 (March 2012) Zuky acts as an estate agent which leads Meebo to defeat. Meebo and Zuky also have an ongoing feature in the sister comic BeanoMAX called Meebo & Zuky's History of Violence, also drawn by Laura Howell. It shows Meebo and Zuky being cruel to one another whilst showing history. It began in BeanoMAX issue 64 (May 2012).
