= Johnny Bean from Happy Bunny Green =

British comic strip

Johnny Bean
- Comic strip character(s) from The Beano

Publication information
- Stars in: Johnny Bean from Happy Bunny Green
- Other names: Tales of Johnny Bean from Happy Bunny Green
- Creator(s): Laura Howell
- First appearance: Issue (27 October 2007)
- Last appearance: 2010
- Also appeared in: The Beano Annual
- Current status: Discontinued

Main Character
- Name: Johnny Bean

Characters
- Regular characters: Mr. Garden, Mrs. Garden, Mr. Butcher, Mr. Baker, Mr Mayor
- Other characters: Slasher, Mrs Garrity, Ima Nutter

(Tales of) Johnny Bean from Happy Bunny Green was a comic strip in the comic The Beano. It first appeared in Beano issue 3404, dated 27 October 2007. It is the first Beano comic strip ever to be regularly drawn by a female artist. The strip's artist is Laura Howell, who also pens and has subsequently taken over outright Hunt Emerson's "Ratz", and has also drawn one Minnie the Minx and one Les Pretend strip.

The strip starred the title character, and his attempts to terrorise the citizens of his village, Happy Bunny Green, in a less extroverted, but more cunning way than that of Dennis the Menace. The citizens include Mr. Garden, his neighbour, Mrs. Garden, his wife, Mr. Baker the butcher and Mr. Butcher the baker, who are sworn enemies. He has a penchant for amazing ruthlessness. In one strip, he shows a cow a picture of a beefburger during a Cowpat Lottery (in which a cow has to defecate on a villager's selected square). In the Beano Annual 2009, he hijacks an anthropomorphic train named Timmy, injures the driver, drives it dangerously, and eventually destroys it (a parody of Thomas the Tank Engine). The early stories featured a narrator, who spoke in a heavily sugar-coated way, but he disappeared during 2008.

His strip continued to appear regularly in the Beano until autumn 2009, when Laura Howell started drawing Beano Manga. As she was already drawing Ratz for the comic, Johnny's appearances became increasingly infrequent. He later made a return as a regular before the strip ended in 2010, after Laura Howell's strip Meebo and Zuky won that year's Comic Idol contest.
