= Gary Northfield =

British cartoonist

Gary Northfield (born June 1969) is a British cartoonist, most famous for his Derek the Sheep comic strip published in DC Thomson's The Beano and BeanoMAX.

Born in Romford, Northfield graduated from Harrow College University of Westminster with a degree in Illustration in 1992. He joined the British small press comics community in 1999, creating various titles such as Great!, Little Box of Comics and Stupidmonsters. In 2002, he acquired the position of in-house illustrator at Eaglemoss Publications, where he worked for five years on projects such as Horrible Histories Magazine, Horrible Science Magazine and The Magical World of Roald Dahl.

Derek the Sheep began appearing in The Beano from February 2004, and is unique in that it is The Beano's first and only creator-owned character. A collection of early Derek the Sheep stories was published by Bloomsbury Publishing in September 2008 and in France by Actes Sud/Editions De L'an2, reprinting the first thirteen strips in The Beano.

In 2008, Northfield illustrated the comic strip Pinky's Crackpot Circus for The Dandy, and wrote and drew World's Greatest Heroes for National Geographic Kids. In 2009, he created Little Cutie for The DFC. In 2012 his strip Gary's Garden began appearing regularly in the weekly comic, The Phoenix, with the first year's worth of strips collected in the book The Phoenix Presents - Gary's Garden: Book 1. In 2016, he returned to The Beano with the strip Zooella.

He also illustrated the children's books Henry VIII Has To Choose and Sleeping Beauty: 100 Years Later, for Franklin Watts.

In 2013, Walker Books published The Terrible Tales Of The Teenytinysaurs, a collection of never-before published strips.

Northfield's first children's novel and international best seller Julius Zebra: Rumble with the Romans!, was published by Walker books in March 2015. His subsequent books in the series are: Julius Zebra: Battle with the Britons!, Julius Zebra: Entangled with the Egyptians!, with the next installment Julius Zebra: Grapple with the Greeks! published in October 2018. His first joke book, Julius Zebra Joke Book Jamboree! was published in June 2019.

In 2017, Northfield alongside his partner, established a new children’s comic book publisher, Bog Eyed Books.

== Books ==
- Derek the Sheep (2008) — Bloomsbury Publishing
- Henry VIII Has To Choose with Julia Jarman (2009) — Franklin Watts
- Sleeping Beauty: 100 Years Later with Laura North (2010) — Franklin Watts
- The Terrible Tales of the Teenytinysaurs (2013) — Walker Books
- The Phoenix Presents - Gary's Garden: Book 1 (2014) — David Fickling Books
- Julius Zebra - Rumble With The Romans! (2015) — Walker Books
- Julius Zebra - Battle With The Britons! (2016) — Walker Books
- Julius Zebra - Entangled with the Egyptians (2017) - Walker Books
- Julius Zebra - Grapple with the Greeks! (2018) — Walker Books
- Julius Zebra - Joke Book Jamboree! (2019) - Walker Books
- Julius Zebra - Quiz Book (2022) Walker Books
- Leif The Unlucky Viking: Saga Of The Shooting Star (2023) Walker Books

== List of published comics ==
- Derek the Sheep (2004–2011) — The Beano and BeanoMAX
- Life of Roald Dahl with Glenn Dakin (2006–2008) — The Magical World of Roald Dahl
- Pinky's Crackpot Circus (2008) — The Dandy
- Little Cutie (2008–2009) — The DFC
- World's Greatest Heroes (2008–2010) and Max the Mouse (2010–2015) — National Geographic Kids
- Gary's Garden (2012–2020) — The Phoenix
- Zoo-Ella (2016) — The Beano
- The Lovely Pirates (2021–present) — The Phoenix
