= Calamity James =

British comic strip

- Character from The Beano

Publication information
- Star of: Calamity James
- First appearance: Issue 2311; (1 November 1986)
- Appearance timeline: Issues 2311 – 3375, 3507, 3660 – present
- Author(s): Uncredited
- Illustrator(s): Tom Paterson; Steve Bright; Bob Dewar; John Geering; Henry Davies; Danny Pearson; Leslie Stannage

In-universe information
- Full name: James
- Occupation: Student
- Family: Mum
- Friends: Alexander Lemming (pet); Little Squelchy Things

Calamity James is a comic strip in the UK comic The Beano. It is about a boy, named Calamity James (a pun on Calamity Jane), who has disastrous luck. He first appeared on 1 November 1986, in issue no. 2311. A copy of his first strip is viewable here. His strip replaced Biffo the Bear and Little Plum, which had both been reduced to a half-page by this time. He has a pet called Alexander Lemming, (a pun on Alexander Fleming).

== Creation and Concept ==
There were several variations of the visual appearance of Calamity James before a final image was decided on. Calamity James has black hair, wears black trousers, and has a red jumper with the number 13 on it. He has big eyes, and many buck teeth, but he originally had small eyes and only two buck teeth. In earlier strips, he was also shown under a permanent black rain cloud. According to the 4 December 2014 issue of the Beano, he has a crush on Minnie the Minx and hopes to become her boyfriend one day.

The strip features much surreal and incidental background detail, with various recurring themes: notably the "Little Squelchy Things" which appear in a wide variety of guises and tend to be visual gags, though they may take part in the story (for instance, James may trip over one), randomly placed smelly socks and a constant scatter of winning lottery tickets, notes with a large sum of money on them, diamonds, gold bars, and bags with 'Vast Dosh' written on them which James walks past yet somehow never manages to notice. Once, when he was complaining about his lack of money, Alex told him to look around (he was surrounded by one of each of the above), as if he had just noticed them, but then it turns out he was referring to busking. Another recurring feature is the appearance of bizarrely-named factories and other buildings, such as "Lumpy Custard Factory" and "Knicker Elastic Testing Sheds", that appear in the background throughout the strips (all accompanied by appropriate sounds).

Tom Paterson has been the main artist for the strip, although Steve Bright has drawn it on occasions, and Bob Dewar ghosted the strip in the 1980s. John Geering and Henry Davies drew some preliminary sets for the character before he first appeared in the comic. He hasn't appeared as regularly as some other characters, as Paterson has also drawn other strips for the same comic including Minnie the Minx, The Numskulls and Dennis the Menace.

=== Alexander Lemming ===
James' long-suffering lemming friend and pet, who rarely has as much bad luck as his owner. One of Alexander's hobbies is plummeting from great heights, which often helps James overcome his fate. He also tends to anoint James with balm or ointment if he gets hurt. In one strip, James gave his shirt to Alexander Lemming, and he had a day of bad luck and James had a day of good luck. Soon, Alexander got fed up with the jumper and gave it back. This credits the belief that James' number 13 is a source of his bad luck.

As loyal a friend as he seems to be, he rather seems to enjoy watching his friend suffer. His name is a play on "Alexander Fleming", the famous biologist and discoverer of penicillin.

== Timeline ==
1 November 1986 Calamity James debuts in the comic. Issue No. 2311

22 November 1986 James' pet, Alexander Lemming, debuts. Issue No. 2314

29 October 1988 "Little Squelchy Things" debut. Issue No. 2415

c.1989 James' eyes were enlarged and he was given more buckteeth.

1993 The strip is rendered in full colour

1997 the strip is digitally rendered in brighter, shinier colour

2001 Tom Paterson takes over Minnie the Minx. By 2003 this, and Paterson's other work for D.C. Thomson, means that James begins to appear on an increasingly infrequent basis.

2004 Steve Bright draws several strips during the year. Of the James strips in 2004, 11 were drawn by Paterson and 8 were drawn by Bright.

2007 the strip is retired, as Tom Paterson starts drawing Dennis the Menace. His final appearance in the weekly comic came in Issue No. 3375.

31 October 2009 James's strip makes a surprise reappearance in the weekly Beano. Issue No. 3507.

7 November 2012 James' strip returns permanently. Issue No. 3660.

== Reception and legacy ==
Due to the artwork and humour of the character, as well as his relatability, Calamity James has been regarded as a classic British Comic character. The scripts behind the strip commonly satirise consumerist values, which may be held by the writer. Some readers, such as George Gale see James' misfortunes as a cruel punishments for him being poor, ugly and stupid, whilst others relate to his misfortunes and can see themselves in such positions. James can be seen as a symbol of inspiration, because even though everything in his life seems to end badly, he always tries to lead a normal life.

As the Beano editor Alan Digby was not keen on the strip, Calamity James gradually appeared less frequently, became reprints and was eventually dropped. However, ex-Beano editor Euan Kerr, who had played a significant role in the creation of the character, was editing the monthly BeanoMax, which he continued to appear in, although Digby has since become editor of that publication. He has appeared as reprints, both in the weekly Beano and BeanoMax and returns in new strips in the Beano Annuals.

Because of his goalkeeping mishaps, English goalkeeper David James has been nicknamed after the character.

== TV adaptation ==
The comic strip was loosely adapted for television as a BBC Three short film in 2023, starring Dylan Blore in the title role and Mark Bonnar as his father.
