= Geering =

Geering may refer to -

== In fiction ==
- Captain Hans Geering, in the television series 'Allo 'Allo!

== People ==
- John Geering (1941–1999), British cartoonist
- Lloyd Geering (1918–2026), New Zealand theologian

== Transport ==
- Geering (automobile), a British marque manufactured 1899–1904.
