= Lord Snooty =

Character in the UK comic The Beano

Marmaduke "Lord Snooty", Earl of Bunkerton
- Character from The Beano
- Colourised version of Lord Snooty, as designed by Dudley D. Watkins.

Publication information
- Star of: Lord Snooty and His Pals (1938–1949, 1950–1958, 1959–1991); A Funny Thing Happened the Other Day (1958); Lord Snooty's Day Out (2001); Are We There Yet? (2005); Lord Snooty (2013, 2014–2018)
- First appearance: Issue 1; (30 July 1938)
- Last appearance: Issue 4111; (13 November 2021)
- Appearance timeline: Issues 1 – 367, 440 – 818, 904 – 2565, 3093, 3737 – 3948, 4111
- Author(s): Uncredited
- Illustrator(s): Dudley D. Watkins (1938–1955, 1965–1968); Leo Baxendale (1955–1956); Albert Holroyd (1958); Robert Nixon (1968–1973); Jimmy Glen (1973–1988); Ken H. Harrison (1988–1991, 2001); Kev F. Sutherland (2005); Lew Stringer (2014–2018)

In-universe information
- Occupation: Student, Earl
- Family: Lord Snooty III (grandson); Aunt Matilda
- Friends: Skinny Lizzie, Professor Screwtop, Hairpin Huggins, Happy Hutton, Gertie the goat, Scrapper Smith, Rosie, Snitch and Snatch, Big Fat Joe, Swanky Lanky Liz, Thomas, and Polly
- Enemies: The Gasworks Gang

Also appeared in
- Beano works: The Beano Annual 1962-1965, 2013; The Bash Street Kids Book 2001
- DC Thomson works: Hoot; The Best of The Topper (all issues, except 4 and 5); The Best of The Beezer; The Legend of Lord Snooty and his Pals (1998); Classics From the Comics

Lord Snooty is a fictional character who stars in the British comic strip Lord Snooty and his Pals from the British comic anthology The Beano. The strip debuted in the first issue of The Beano, illustrated by DC Thomson artist Dudley D. Watkins, who designed and wrote Snooty's stories until 1968, but the stories would continue featuring in Beano issues until 1991, with occasional revivals and character cameos.

== Synopsis ==
Lord Snooty starred a wealthy Eton schoolboy named Marmaduke, the bored Earl of Bunkerton, who often sneaked out of his home to bond with the working-class children on the other side of town. His friends knew he was a wealthy child and affectionately nicknamed him "Snooty", but he donned a disguise to hide from his family and the Bunkerton Castle staff. Other stories followed misadventures in Snooty's life, such as him outsmarting or helping the residents of the castle, causing or running into mayhem with his friends, visiting Professor Screwtop to help with his new invention, or rivalling the Gasworks Gang.

== Publication history ==
=== Original run ===
Lord Snooty and His Pals first appeared in issue 1 of The Beano, debuting with the comic strips Wee Peem, Morgyn the Mighty, Wild Boy of the Woods, Here Comes Ping the Elastic Man and cover star Big Eggo. It was one of the notable few in the first issue inspired by the "funny pages" from American newspapers, whereas the rest of the magazine contained adventure stories written in prose. Dudley D. Watkins illustrated, an in-house DC Thomson artist known for creating stories for Oor Wullie and The Dandy's Desperate Dan. The strip ended in issue 367, returning December 1950 in issue 440. Upon return, many of Snooty's friends were replaced with characters from discontinued Beano strips. Watkins continued illustrating many stories throughout the 1950s and 1960s, but Leo Baxendale illustrated strips from issues 691 to 718. Robert Nixon became the new artist in 1968 from issue 1343, followed by Jimmy Glen from issue 1594, and Ken H. Harrison from issue 2379. Harrison's last story would appear in 1991 in issue 2565, making Lord Snooty the last series from the first issue to feature in The Beano.

There were two hiatuses in the comic strip's run: the first from August 1949 to December 1950, and the second between March 1958 and November 1959. The latter hiatus did not remove Snooty's appearances entirely, helped by six-issued, Albert Holroyd-illustrated series A Funny Thing Happened the Other Day—described as "a coda" to the second series. Secretly, the hiatus was longer than advertised: Lord Snooty and His Pals reprints filled the third series run until 1964; some panels redrawn to replace Lord Snooty's old pals with the crossover characters.

=== Subsequent appearances ===
Due to a loss of popularity, Lord Snooty's stories petered away in 1991, but he would still cameo in other comic strips or feature in short revivals. A notable one was in 2001, in issue 3093's Lord Snooty's Day Out, which revealed Snooty and many popular comic strip stars of previous generations now lived in the Beano Retirement Home. He also guest-starred in the 65th anniversary issue alongside The Bash Street Kids, and starred in Kev F. Sutherland's Are We There Yet? in 2005 where he tries to become the newest hip-hop artist Snoot Doggy-Dogg. In the 2010s, Lord Snooty received more appearances and new stories, often authored and illustrated by Lew Stringer: a feature in the Funsize Funnies, and a revival series in 2014. For the 80th anniversary, he appeared in issue 3945 in a flashback with other characters from 1938. Snooty's last appearance was a background cameo in 2021 in issue 4111.

Outside of the weekly comic, Snooty featured heavily through the franchise, with exclusive stories in The Beano Annual throughout the years—often coinciding with his comic strip runs, and appeared with Snitch and Snatch in 2001's Bash Street Kids Book. He also appeared in the inner cover artwork of the 2019 Beano Annual with 254 other characters from The Beano's history and was in the time-travelling comic feature "Doctor Whoops!" On 9 September 1998, a book entitled The Legend of Lord Snooty and his Pals was published, containing a history of the comic strip and reprints from the first 30 years of the strip's life.

=== In other DC Thomson comics ===
Lord Snooty also featured throughout DC Thomson's other comic magazines. Hoot featured short three frame strips involving the character drawn by George Martin. Reprints featured in Classics from the Comics, The Best of The Beezer and The Best of The Topper.

== Characters ==
=== Regular characters ===
- Marmaduke "Lord Snooty", Earl of Bunkerton – main character. The son of the Duke, according to the first issue's tagline, who is uninterested in his responsibilities and wants to have a normal life like his working-class friends. He would wear a disguise (patchy dungarees, a flat cap and scuffed shoes) to hide from his family and the castle staff until story 6. Despite his uninterest in taking charge so young, stories are usually about Snooty using his connections to humble adults in authority who use rules to boss him or his friends around (e.g. the mayor, his staff, teachers, police).
- Aunt Matilda – Snooty's strict guardian who means well, nicknamed Aunt Mat. She meets Snooty's friends in story 5 believing they rescued him after he collapsed in a wooded area and allows them to visit him at Bunkerton Castle. Bunkerton staff's appearances diminish throughout the stories so Matilda frequently relies on her nephew and his friends to help her with repairs, decorating and cleaning the castle.
- Samuel – the castle guard.

=== Ash Can Alley kids ===
First described as "the Beezer kids of Ash-Can Alley", Snooty's friends lived in Bunkerton Castle's nearby working-class neighbourhood of Ash Can and attended Ash Can Council School. From 1938 to the story's first hiatus, (excluding Snooty) there were six members, including a goat, and then identical toddlers joined the group later. When Lord Snooty and His Pals returned in 1950, the only remaining original members were the identical twins, Scrapper and Rosie, whilst the rest of Snooty's friends would leave and be replaced by other characters who had already been established in their own Beano comic strips.

==== Original friends ====
- Skinny Lizzie – thin girl with a dark, messy bob hairstyle, who wears a bobble hat
- Hairpin Huggins – a skinny boy almost as tall as some of the adults.
- "Happy" Hutton – a boy with light-coloured hair (later revealed blond in coloured Beano issues) whose resting face looks tired, wrinkled and sulky. Seemingly nicknamed "happy" for irony, Hutton has often been shown in panels smiling or laughing with the rest of his friends.
- Gertie the Goat – a goat the children use for transport or as an honorary human who helps them in sports or with chores.
- Scrapper Smith – boy with a shaggy side-part with dimpled cheeks who loves fighting; stayed on to live in the castle. He received a two-series spin-off in 1955.
- Rosie – short girl with curly blonde hair who loves cooking
- Snitch and Snatch – identical twins in babygrows who cause mischief and mayhem. They were the last members to join, first appearing in issue 18.

A few members of the Ash Can Alley Gang, represented in the 2019 Beano Annual. Left to right: Doubting Thomas, Lanky Liz (with Snitch in front), Rosie on Scrapper's shoulders, Snooty, and Big Fat Joe (with Snatch in front of him).

==== The new friends from 1950 onwards ====
- Joe – the dapper, overweight boy from Big Fat Joe, which was also a first issue Beano comic strip (ended issue 35). Like Snooty, he featured in the 65th anniversary issue, starring alongside Billy Whizz.
- Liz – former star of Swanky, Lanky Liz (issue 336 to 368) by Charles Holt. Liz continued her traits of being snobbish and vain.
- Thomas – innocent, large-eyed former star of Doubting Thomas (ran from issues 90 to 174) by James Crighton.
- Polly – former star of Polly Wolly Doodle and her Great Big Poodle by George Drysdale, which appeared between issues 286 and 306. It was about the misadventures of Polly and her poodle Pongo, who also joins her in the crossover.
- Mary – the stubborn mule from Contrary Mary by Roland Davies. The series was also in the first issue of The Beano (ended issue 97) that was reprinted as "Neddy the Cuddy" in The People's Journal.

=== Other characters ===
- Professor Screwtop – inventor who always has a new invention ready for trial tests; first appeared in issue 40. He occasionally appeared in other Beano strips such as the Bash Street Kids. Since 2017, he has appeared in the TV series Dennis & Gnasher: Unleashed! along with his daughter, Rubidium "Rubi".
- Angus – Snooty's pet stag. First appeared in issue 1536.
- Cyril – the Castle Jackdaw.
- The Gasworks Gang – sworn enemies of Snooty and his pals. First appeared in issue 11, dubbed the "Toughs from Gas Lane".
- Dudley D. Watkins cameoed in issue 170 to teach the children how to draw, but when the Ash-Can kids discover Watkins is creating a comic starring the boys from Gasworks, Snooty uses his drawing practice to modify the story, leading to the offended Gasworks boys attacking Watkins.

== Reception and legacy ==
One of the many mastheads for Lord Snooty and His Pals.

Lord Snooty is often regarded as part of the golden age of comic characters and has become one of few to earn his own collection of strips. It was a popular strip upon its release with Wee Peem and Little Dead-Eye Dick, possibly because the working-class children would relate to Snooty venturing with children from their family background. The media wrote of its shock when the series was cancelled in 1991: Mr Pepys called it "[an] occasion for nationwide mourning"; The Guardian implied its inference of paranoia and cowardice in Dr John Casey's article about the event in The Daily Mail because of Casey comparing it to "John Major's drive for a classless society, a concept which does not go down very well in the sort of Scrutonian circles to which John Casey belongs." The new editor, Euan Kerr, admitted being apathetic towards the series, mostly because 1990s' children were far removed from a story about characters from the early 20th century. "The sad truth is that he regularly came at the bottom of readers' popularity polls," he explained. "His top hat and Eton collar must baffle today's kids. At the time he was created in 1938, it was a more divided society and children at that stage would like to have been like him and live in a castle."

Lord Snooty was name checked on the 1967 Bonzo Dog Doo-Dah Band recording, "The Intro and the Outro." Pop art company Art & Hue featured Snooty as a member of their Beano 80th anniversary portraits.

=== "Lord Snooty" as slang ===
In popular British culture, "Lord Snooty" is pejorative to describe a high-profile person (usually a politician) from an upper middle class family who is too privileged to relate to the rest of the United Kingdom, despite how hard they try to. In 1995, Craig Brown criticised Roy Hattersley for claiming Eton College was the wrong school to send teenaged Prince William because Lord Snooty attended it, writing in the Evening Standard: "I doubt the creators at the Dundee firm of DC Thomson ever intended [Snooty and the children of Ash-Can Alley] to be thought of as Etonians."

When Charles Moore was announced as The Daily Telegraph's new editor, some critiques believed his "sobriquet of Lord Snooty" would bring a conservative agenda to the newspaper, according to Stephen Clover, who ended his overview with: "Lord Snooty does know what they are thinking in the suburbs and market towns rather better than most of [Charles Moore's] metropolitan critics." Moore would later write about David Cameron in 2009, theorising that Cameron shared similarities to friend-to-the-poor Lord Snooty, as well as Snooty's "repulsive" grandson, in his attempt to befriend the poor like both boys. Alex Salmond also called the Cameron-led Conservative government "a bunch of incompetent Lord Snootys" in 2012.

Shona McIsaac used the comic strip to describe her doubts that hereditary peers would still have power in The House of Lords: "If The Beano, which is a far more loved institution than the House of Lords, can get rid of Lord Snooty, the parliamentary Bash Street Kids can certainly get rid of hereditary peers."

A by-election leaflet depicting Edward Timpson photoshopped wearing a top hat in 2008 did not have explicit ties to the comic strip character, but alleged Labour Party campaigns to make voters draw comparisons were nicknamed such.

== Spin-offs ==
=== Scrapper (1955–1957, 1959) ===
Scrapper
- Story from The Beano

Publication information
- First issue: Issue 680; (30 July 1955)
- Last issue: Issue 890; (8 August 1959)
- Genre: Comic strip
- Story timeline: Issues 680 – 769, 880 – 890
- Main character(s): Scrapper Smith

Story features in
- Beano works: The Beano Annual 1957

George Drysdale and Albert Holroyd alternated as illustrators for the Lord Snooty and His Pals spin-off Scrapper. Starring Snooty's friend Scrapper Smith, the comic strip documents Scrapper's desire to have physical altercations with others and going to extreme lengths to do so. Being one of the only original friends from Ash Can Alley to still feature in The Beano, Smith had noticeably changed appearance since his debut, becoming curly-haired, taller and with broad shoulders, despite Snooty never changing appearance or an implication in Snooty's universe that significant time passed for a drastic transformation.

There were two series between 1955 and 1959. Due to DC Thomson keeping published works uncredited, it is unknown how many or which comic strips were illustrated by Drysdale or Holroyd, but documents credit Holroyd as the sole designer for the second series.

=== Lord Snooty the Third (2008–2011) ===
Lord Snooty the Third
- Story from The Beano
- Lord Snooty the Third, with butler Parkinson in the background (right).

Publication information
- First issue: Issue 3439; (5 July 2008)
- Last issue: Issue 3579; (5 April 2011)
- Genre: Comic strip
- Story timeline: Issues 3439 – 3579
- Main character(s): Lord Snooty the Third; Parkinson; Emo; Frankie; Naz; One; Three

Story features in
- Beano works: The Beano Annual 2011; BeanoMAX (issue 49)

Issue 3439 introduced Lord Snooty the Third, illustrated by Nigel Parkinson. It stars a mischievous boy who lives in a castle, establishing this by showing him jetskiing on Lake Snooty. Although it was originally entered as part of the New Bash Street Kid competition, the following issue reveals this new character is Marmaduke's grandson, showing a distinctive and recognisable "Grandad" in the family portrait gallery. Later on, Snooty the Third became a spy, parodying James Bond.

Snooty III also has a long-suffering and sarcastic butler named Parkinson. He has also formed his own gang, consisting of an adolescent named Naz, a young girl named Frankie, Emo, and One and Three the triplets (who claim that Two does not "hang out" with them much). The strip did not prove popular among readers and the comic series officially ended in 2011 after making less frequent appearances.
