= The Nibblers =

British comic strip

- Comic strip character(s) from The Beano

Publication information
- Creator(s): Ron Spencer
- Other contributors: John Sherwood; David Sutherland
- Current/last artist: Hunt Emerson
- First appearance: Issue XXXX (1970)
- Last appearance: c. 2012
- Also appeared in: The Beano Annual
- Current status: Discontinued

Characters
- Regular characters: His Nibs, Cheddar George, Gordonzola, Enor Mouse, Chiseller, Sniffler, Scritch and Scratch, Porky, Whiskers

The Nibblers are fictional characters who have their own comic strip in the UK comic The Beano. Also known as 'The Bash Street Mice', The Nibblers were a community of mice who lived in a hole in the wall, and were always stealing food from Porky, the fat owner of the house. Porky and his cat Whiskers were repeatedly foiled in their attempts to catch The Nibblers, who nearly always had the last laugh. Like The Bash Street Kids, the Nibblers all had distinct personalities. Their names were:

- His Nibs – The chief nibbler.
- Cheddar George – Champion guzzler.
- Gordonzola – Half-Scottish, half-Italian.
- Enor Mouse – Strong, but er... daft.
- Chiseller – Our engineer.
- Sniffler – A nose for food and trouble.
- Scritch and Scratch – The terrible twins, similar to Snitch and Snatch in Lord Snooty.

The strip originally ran from 1970 to 1974. In 1977 it was revived, and continued in the comic until 1984. The initial run was drawn by Ron Spencer, and the second by John Sherwood.

In the Ratz strip in the Beano Annual 2009, Herman, one of the main characters, goes off to Hollywood. Keef and Rod look for a new Herman and the Nibblers audition for the vacancy. They made a surprise reappearance in the 2012 annual, drawn by David Sutherland, along with a reprint in the weekly comic's Retro Beano section in issue 3597, dated 6 August 2011. They also re-appeared in the weekly comic drawn by Hunt Emerson from 2014.
