= Derek the Sheep =

British comic character

- Comic strip character(s) from The Beano

Publication information
- Stars in: Derek the Sheep
- Creator(s): Gary Northfield
- First appearance: Issue 3214 (21 February 2004)
- Last appearance: June 2011
- Also appeared in: The Beano Annual

Main Character
- Name: Derek the Sheep
- Family: Benny the Sheep (nephew)
- Friends: Lenny the Sheep, Cecil the Bee, Dave Carrot

Characters
- Regular characters: Doris the Bee, Nobby the Hedgehog, Kevin the Rabbit, Big Baz, Mad Nigel, Rodney the Bull, Bernard the Goat
- Other characters: Bert Worm, Alan Chicken, Vera Cow, and Barry Chicken
- Crossover characters: Gnasher, Walter The Softy

Derek the Sheep is a fictional character and comic strip in the British comic The Beano. He first appeared in issue 3214, dated 21 February 2004. The strip is set on a farm and was about Derek's endless problems with the other animals.

Derek the Sheep was created by Gary Northfield and appeared occasionally in the comic, however, since the Beano re-vamp Derek has not been seen, but appeared regularly in monthly BeanoMAX until June 2011. Gary Northfield both writes and draws for the character.

Derek has been published in France by Actes Sud/Editions De L'an2 and a collection the first thirteen strips was published in bookform from Bloomsbury Publishing in September 2008. The character is known as Norbert Le Mouton in French.

Three further collections were published by Bog Eyed Books in 2018; named: Let's Bee Friends, The First Sheep in Space and Danger is my middle name.

== Characters ==
- Derek the Sheep
- Lenny the Sheep: He is Derek's friend. Appeared less in the last couple of years
- Cecil the Bee: Another one of Derek's friends.
- Doris the Bee: Cecil's sister. Has a crush on Derek. Normally quite sweet-natured, but dangerous when angry.
- Nobby the Hedgehog
- Kevin the Rabbit: Generally took over as the second character in the last couple of years.
- Big Baz: Derek's worst enemy.
- Mad Nigel: Derek's second worst enemy. Hasn't been seen since the last part of Sold Out, when he was given to the zoo in place of zebras.
- Rodney the Bull:
- Bernard the Goat:
- Bingo the Goat: Seen only in the strip "Sold Out".
- Farmer Jack: Mentioned quite a lot, but rarely seen.
- Alan the Horse:
- Benny the Sheep: Derek's nephew, who always said "Beep!".
- Dave Carrot, who was Derek's companion when he became stranded on an island.
- Bert Worm, mentioned on the weblog, although never seen in the comic.
- Alan Chicken: A chicken who has wonky legs, who has also only been mentioned on the weblog.
- Gnasher, Dennis the Menace's dog, has appeared in the 2007 Beano Annual episode.
- Walter The Softy also appeared in that story.
- Vera Cow: The only girl on the farm, during the last few years.
- Barry Chicken: Derek doesn't like him.
