= Smudge (comics) =

British comic strip, 1980-1999

- Comic strip character(s) from The Beano

Publication information
- Creator(s): John Geering
- First appearance: Issue XXXX (19 April 1980)
- Last appearance: c. 1999
- Also appeared in: The Beano Annual; Side by Side: 60 Years
- Current status: Discontinued

Main Character
- Name: Smudge
- Alias(es): The Scruffiest Boy in Town
- Family: Smudge's mother

Characters
- Regular characters: Percival Primm
- Crossover characters: Smudge (The Dandy)

Smudge was a British comic strip published in the comics magazine The Beano from 19 April 1980, until about 1999. He appeared regularly from 1980 to 1986, while continuing to make sporadic appearances into the 1990s, with his final appearance in the comics magazine coming in 1999. However, he was only seen twice after 1994. The series was drawn by John Geering.

== Concept ==
Smudge was a little boy who described himself as "the scruffiest boy in town and proud of it", relishing any opportunity to get filthy. His main rival was the snooty Percival Primm. Other characters in the strip included Smudge's Mum and over the years he had two different pets firstly a mouse and an animal of a never revealed although bipedal species (this is something of a running joke in Smudge strips) completely covered in mud and called Spludge.

There was also another character, a girl, of the same name in the 1940s Dandy. The two characters appeared alongside each other for comparison in the Side By Side 60 Years book.
