= Les Pretend =

British comic book character

- Comic strip character(s) from The Beano

Publication information
- Stars in: Les Pretend
- Creator(s): John Sherwood
- Other contributors: Trevor Metcalfe
- Current/last artist: Paul Palmer; Trevor Metcalfe; Laura Howell
- First appearance: Issue 2493 (28 April 1990)
- Last appearance: 2020
- Also appeared in: The Beano Annual
- Current status: Discontinued
- Schedule: Limited

Main Character
- Name: Lesley Pretend
- Alias(es): Les
- Family: Des (father); Mrs. Pretend (mother)

Characters
- Regular characters: Les, Des, Mrs. Pretend

Lesley Presley Pretend is a fictional character in a comic strip (Les Pretend) in the UK comic The Beano with the byline "the Little kid with the big imagination". Originally drawn by John Sherwood, he first appeared in issue 2493, dated 28 April 1990. In each issue, Les pretends to be something and dresses up like it, beginning with a Martian in his debut. His dad is called Des (and is thus one of the few Beano parents to be given a name rather than 'mum' or 'dad'), an Elvis Presley fan and impersonator, hence Les' middle name of Presley. Recurring features of the strip are the feasibility of Les' (often improvised) costumes, and the readiness with which Des accepts things like the appearance of a giant creature, and attempts to deal with it in a rational and unfazed way.

Sherwood continued to draw the strip until his death in late 2003. The strip then disappeared from The Beano for a short while, as it was originally planned to retire the character. Eventually, though, it returned to the comic drawn by Trevor Metcalfe, who drew it for about a year between 2004 and 2005, though Steve Bright also drew a few episodes in early 2004. The strip again disappeared before returning a couple of years later, this time drawn by Laura Howell. This was a one off, and showed Les beating a real Dalek in a Dalek fancy dress competition, and appeared in Beano issue 3402 dated 13 October 2007. A Johnny Bean from Happy Bunny Green strip by the same artist followed this up with everyone dressed as vegetables in another fancy dress competition. Les wasn't seen again for nearly a year after that strip until the comic started to run reprints of John Sherwood strips from the 1990s. Laura Howell also drew Les's strip for the 2010 and 2011 Beano Annuals. Sometime shortly before Mike Stirling became editor, Les Pretend was dropped.

Les Pretend returned to The Beano in the Funsize Funnies in #3660 drawn by Laura Howell once again. Les also appeared back into the Beano 2016 annual twice, drawn by Laura Howell. he dresses up as his mum and orders pizza, then Des starts to prefer Les for a mum than the actual mum so Les' mum dresses up as Les. Les also dresses up as a cat, which his Dad uses on his Elvis Presley website to attract more people.
