= Emilios Hatjoullis =

British cartoonist and graphic designer (born 1939)

Emilios Hatjoullis is a retired British cartoonist and graphic designer. During the 1960s he was a designer at the Blackpool Pleasure Beach and at the Blackpool Illuminations. His works include the tableaux displays of nursery rhymes such as 'Hickory Dickory Dock' and 'Mary, Mary, Quite Contrary', which are still exhibited during the light festival in the autumn. At the Blackpool Pleasure Beach Emilios Hatjoullis helped with the design the psychedelic Candy House and the redesign of the Noah's Ark from its dated 1920s style.

At the end of the 1960s Emilios Hatjoullis went to become creative director at Brunning's advertising agency in Liverpool. For the local Higsons brewery he created a series of characters called the 'Old Higsonians' named after Liverpool landmarks such as Albert Dock, Penny Lane, and Ann Field. However, in 1985 the Higson's brewery was bought out by Boddingtons of Manchester and the ad campaign was stopped, leaving a limited number of collectible breweriana merchandise.

Emilios Hatjoullis worked for the Beano comic illustrating the infantile thief Baby Face Finlayson. He drew Baby Face Finlayson between 2004 and 2007 for the comic, and had drawn Merboy in the 1990s.
