= Colonel Crackpot's Circus =

British comic strip

- Illustrator: Malcolm Judge
- Launch date: 1960
- End date: 1963
- Publisher: D. C. Thomson & Co.
- Genre: Humour

Colonel Crackpot's Circus was a British comic strip, published from 1960 until 1963 in The Beano. It was the first Beano comic strip drawn by Malcolm Judge, who later went on to draw Billy Whizz and Ball Boy for the same comic, as well as The Numskulls for The Beezer.

== Plot ==
The strip was about a circus and the slapstick adventures of the circus folk and often involved Colonel Crackpot (the circus ringleader) trying not to pay his workforce what they were worth. In its Beano incarnation the main characters were Colonel Crackpot (the ringleader), Charlie Globes (the strong man, his name being a play on Charles Atlas), and Cynthia the fat lady.

== Return ==
The comic strip was later revived in The Dandy, under the title Pinky's Crackpot Circus, in a strip drawn by Nick Brennan and later by Gary Northfield. This revival first appeared in October 2003. Characters during this time included Pinky the ringleader, Spanky and Blotto the clowns, Brenda the bearded lady, Rick the human cannonball, Thomas the tightrope walker, Lenny the lion tamer, and Mehmet the elephant.
