= Wee Peem =

British comic strip character

- Character from The Beano

Publication information
- Star of: Wee Peem (He's a Proper Scream) (1939–1940); Wee Peem's Magic Pills (1951–1952); Wee Peem (1956–1957)
- First appearance: Issue 1; (30 July 1938)
- Last appearance: Issue 3945; (25 July 2018)
- Appearance timeline: Issues 1 – 89, 714 – 765, 486 – 507, 3945
- Author(s): Uncredited
- Illustrator(s): James Malcom; Charles Grigg; Hugh Morren

Wee Peem was a British comic strip character in The Beano, first written and designed by James Jewell. He starred in two comic strips between 1938 and 1957, and would get up to various forms of mischief in a similar way to later Beano strips such as Dennis the Menace and Minnie the Minx.

== Synopsis ==
Peem is a little boy with a large, round head with long limbs, usually dressed in a stripy jumper, shorts, and a strip cap too small for his head. His stories would be about his misbehaviours irritating and angering adults. His name is "Little James" in the Scots language.

== Character history ==
Peem debuted in Wee Peem (He's a Proper Scream) in The Beano's first issue (Note: Named The Beano Comic at this time.) with Lord Snooty and His Pals, Helpful Henry, Morgyn the Mighty, The Adventures of Tom Thumb, and Big Eggo. The Beano magazine contained two types of children's fiction: comic strips and adventure prose stories; Wee Peem was the former, inspired by the funny pages of American newspapers. When it ended in issue 89, DC Thomson reprinted some of the Wee Peem strips in The People's Journal, along with some new stories by James Malcolm.

A similar character in both appearance and mannerisms appeared in the first Dandy Monster Comic under the name Dipper the Dodger.

Peem returned to The Beano a decade later in issue 486's Wee Peem's Magic Pills, a 21-issue series by Charles Grigg about Peem and his mischief after finding a bottle of tablets (named B-Pills) that fell from Dr Quack's medicine truck. Peem made his first Beano Annual appearance in 1940.

In 1956, the Wee Peem strip got rebooted by Hugh Morren for 51 stories between issues 714 and 765. As of 2021, it was the last time Peem had a Beano series, although he would make appearances for the 80th anniversary in both the 2019 Beano Annual and the 80th-anniversary issue.
