= Leo Baxendale =

English cartoonist (1930–2017)

- Born: Joseph Leo Baxendale; 27 October 1930 Whittle-le-Woods, Lancashire, England
- Died: 23 April 2017 (aged 86)
- Areas: Cartoonist, Publisher
- Notable works: The Bash Street Kids; Little Plum; Minnie the Minx; The Three Bears; Grimly Feendish; The Swots and the Blots; Sweeny Toddler
- Awards: British Comic Awards Hall of Fame
- Spouse: Peggy
- Children: 5

Joseph Leo Baxendale (27 October 1930 – 23 April 2017) was an English cartoonist and publisher. Baxendale wrote and drew several titles. Among his best-known creations are the Beano strips Little Plum, Minnie the Minx, The Bash Street Kids, and The Three Bears.

== Career ==
Baxendale was born in Whittle-le-Woods, Lancashire, and was educated at Preston Catholic College. After serving in the RAF, he took his first job as an artist for the local Lancashire Evening Post drawing adverts and cartoons.

=== DC Thomson ===
In 1952, he began freelance work for the children's comic publishers DC Thomson, creating several highly popular new strips for The Beano including Little Plum, Minnie the Minx (started in 1953, taken over by Jim Petrie in 1961), The Three Bears, and The Bash Street Kids (initially called When the Bell Rings). Baxendale also co-operated on the launch of DC Thomson's The Beezer comic in 1956. To facilitate his work for DC Thomson, Baxendale relocated to the publisher's location city of Dundee, Scotland. Baxendale's time with D.C. Thomson came to an abrupt end in 1962 when, overburdened with work, he in his own words "just blew up like an old boiler" and left.

=== Odhams ===
In 1964, Baxendale began work for Odhams Press to set up and design a new children's comic, Wham! and, two years later, its sister comic Smash! In its early issues, Wham! presented both clear imitations of Beano strips, such as a clone of his The Bash Street Kids in the shape of The Tiddlers, and new original strips such as Eagle-Eye, Junior Spy and Georgie's Germs, in which he attempted to break the mould of older strips by the use of bizarre humour, outrageous puns, and surreal plots. (Baxendale earned £8,000 in his first year at Odhams — equivalent to £165,000 in 2020.)

Eagle-Eye, Junior Spy, birthed two spinoff strips in Smash! in 1966. The first one, The Man From B.U.N.G.L.E., was also a spoof of the popular TV series The Man from U.N.C.L.E.. (Baxendale drew the first few editions, which appeared as large single illustrations on some early covers of Smash!; after which Mike Lacey took over.) Grimly Feendish, starred Eagle-Eye's most popular character, along with various travelling accomplices (including bats, spiders, octopuses and other creatures of darkness and slime) who assisted Feendish in his schemes of world domination.

Another strip Baxendale created for Smash! — The Swots and the Blots — was about two rival gangs (the Swots and the Blots) vying to outwit each other at Pond Road School, with "Teach" caught in the crossfire. The strip's origins lay in Baxendale's classroom-based strip The Tiddlers, which had then been running for two years in Wham! (and which continued in Pow! when it and Wham merged in 1968, where it was combined with Ron Spencer's The Dolls of St. Dominics to become The Tiddlers and The Dolls). In fact, The Swots and the Blots was a direct continuation of The Tiddlers, with only a change of title. The characters (i.e. "Teach" and the Blots), school buildings, and situations were all largely as they had been in The Tiddlers. The only difference was the addition of the Swots, so that Teach now had an ally. Although The Swots and the Blots was created by Baxendale, the first couple of years of the strip were drawn by Mike Lacey. (As had happened with some of Baxendale's work for Wham!, artists such as Lacey were commissioned from time to time to "ghost" Baxendale's style. Baxendale was allowed to sign his early work on Smash!, but in practice, he signed very few them, so it is quite difficult to tell which are his and which are other artists substituting for him.)

The Swots and the Blots always had wit and a sense of style, but it reached a new standard of excellence when Baxendale began drawing it for the new-look Smash! from March 1969. (In Baxendale's hands, it had notable similarities to his earlier classroom-based strip, The Bash Street Kids, in The Beano.) The strip became a standard-bearer for sophisticated artwork. Baxendale began a five-year run on the strip (beginning in Smash! and continuing in its successor, Valiant and Smash, with some fill-ins by Les Barton), by adopting a new style, one which influenced many others in the comics field, just as his earlier The Beano work had done; and in the process attaining a new, deliriously daft, high standard, one rarely approached by other strips.

The title logo of Baxendale's Bad Penny strip featured a portrait of Penny and an illustration of a giant pre-decimal One Penny coin (the coin suggesting the connection with the proverb from which the character's name originated). Penny had some similarities with Baxendale's earlier Minnie the Minx character in The Beano. When Baxendale had been drawing Minnie the Minx, he had concentrated on experimenting with facial expressions and character traits. By the time he began working on Bad Penny his drawing style had matured, with an equal concentration on developing a zany but tight storyline, less emphasis on close-ups of facial expressions, but retaining the essentials needed to put over a character's own personality traits. When the strip was eventually dropped in Smash!, Bad Penny herself still continued to appear, making occasional appearances in The Swots and the Blots as a new member of the Blots.

=== Fleetway ===
Around 1968, Baxendale left Odhams for another, better-paying IPC subsidiary — Fleetway Publications. Despite the transfer, Baxendale still needed to earn money from Odhams without disclosing that he was now working for both companies. It must be remembered that Odhams was in rivalry with Fleetway — despite the fact that both publishers were parts of the same Mirror Group. As Baxendale said, "Alf Wallace once made a cry aside to me to illustrate the hostility between Fleetway and Odhams: 'If I were to go across to the Fleetway canteen to have lunch, they would soon order me out'."

Accordingly, Baxendale still contributed strips to Odhams' Smash!, but did so without signing his work. For instance, for strips like Bad Penny and Grimly Feendish, Baxendale pencilled the drawings, and Mike Brown, an animator by trade, inked them in. In this way, they together turned out large numbers of the strips, which they sold to Odhams under Brown's name — a situation Baxendale referred to, in his 1978 autobiography, as working "undercover":

I was in a delightful situation. Working under my own name, a lot was expected of me. Publishers expected me to cram my drawings with funny detail. A double standard operated. Working undercover, I was able to reduce the layouts to the simplest terms. Backgrounds were minimal or non-existent – just a horizon line. And there was no ancillary comic detail – just the characters acting out the storyline against an empty backdrop."

One of the strips Baxendale produced for Fleetway was Big Chief Pow Wow for Buster — the strip ran from 14 September 1968 to 31 January 1970 (some issues were fill-ins by other artists). For Fleetway, he also created Clever Dick and Sweeny Toddler.

=== Move to adult comics ===
Baxendale left the world of mainstream British children's comics in 1975, creating the more adult-orientated Willy the Kid series, published by Duckworths. In the 1980s he fought a seven-year legal battle with DC Thomson for the rights to his Beano creations, which was eventually settled out of court. His earnings from that settlement allowed Baxendale to found the publishing house Reaper Books in the late 1980s. In the same year, he brought out THRRP!, an adult comic book.

For a year before he fully retired from cartooning to concentrate on publishing in 1992, Baxendale drew I Love You Baby Basil! for The Guardian.

== Personal life ==
In the mid-1960s, Baxendale published a weekly anti-war newsletter the Strategic Commentary. Though it had some paying subscribers, including fellow Vietnam War opponent Noam Chomsky, Baxendale made a considerable loss from sending hundreds of free weekly copies to Labour Party MPs.

Leo Baxendale and his wife Peggy had five children, including Martin Baxendale, who also became a cartoonist and worked on some of his father's strips.

== Death ==
Leo Baxendale died of cancer on 23 April 2017 at the age of 86. Andy Fanton, who at the time of Baxendale's death was the Beano's writer for several Baxendale-created strips, lauded his predecessor as "the godfather of so much of what we do".

== Awards ==
Baxendale was the second person inducted into the British Comic Awards Hall of Fame, in 2013. He was described as having created "a lifetime of original, anarchic, hilarious and revolutionary comics" and having had an "incalculable" influence on children and comic artists, while his work was lauded for being "an integral and inseparable part of the history of British children's comics." The BBC said that he was "regarded by aficionados as one of Britain's greatest and most influential cartoonists" and quoted the British cartoonist Lew Stringer as saying that Baxendale was "quite simply the most influential artist in UK humour comics".

== Notable creations ==
Over the course his career, Baxendale worked for a number of different publishers, writing and drawing many different strips in several different comics. The following lists some of Baxendale's most well-known creations. As well as creating new strips, Baxendale also worked on pre-existing properties, such as Lord Snooty in Beano, issues 691–718.

=== D.C. Thomson ===
The Beano

- Little Plum
- Minnie the Minx
- The Bash Street Kids (originally When the Bell Rings)
- The Three Bears

The Beezer

- The Banana Bunch

=== Odhams Press ===
Wham!

- Eagle-Eye, Junior Spy
- The Tiddlers (later became The Tiddlers and The Dolls)
- General Nitt and his Barmy Army
- Georgie's Germs
- Grimly Feendish

Smash!

- Bad Penny
- The Swots and the Blots
- Sam's Spook

=== IPC/Fleetway ===
- Big Chief Pow Wow
- Sweeny Toddler
- Clever Dick

=== Other ===
- Willy the Kid
- THRRP!
- I Love You Baby Basil

== Bibliography ==
- Baxendale, Leo (1978). A Very Funny Business: 40 Years of Comics. London: Gerald Duckworth & Co.
- Baxendale, Leo (1988). The Encroachment pt.1. Stroud, UK: Reaper Books.
- Baxendale, Leo (1989). On Comedy: The Beano and Ideology. Stroud, UK: Reaper Books.
