= Jim Petrie =

British comic artist

Jim Petrie (2 June 1932 – 25 August 2014) was a British comic artist born in Kirriemuir, Scotland. He is most notable for drawing 2,000 episodes of Minnie the Minx, a comic strip featured in The Beano, after taking over from the strips original artist Leo Baxendale in 1961. Jim Petrie's first Minnie the Minx strip appeared in The Beano dated 6 June 1961 and featured Minnie destroying her mother's feather duster to make a red indian headdress and taking her friends captive. This strip ended with Minnie being caught by her father and subsequently slippered by him, a common end for a comic strip from this era.

As well as drawing Minnie the Minx, he drew a Minnie the Minx spinoff featuring Fatty Fudge a recurring character from Minnie the Minx. This strip featured Fatty Fudge in food based parodies of popular films such as a parody of The Hound of the Baskervilles entitled Hound of the Picnic Basket. These strips ended in 1991 and have recently been reprinted in the Beano's Retro Beano section.

Other than these two strips Jim Petrie also drew The Sparky People in the comic of that name, Sneaker for The Dandy, Says Smiffy and What to do with a sleeping dad for The Beano. In addition, Petrie drew The Incredible Sulk for Jackpot comic from 1979 to 1982 and Billy Green and his Sister Jean, which appeared in the Dandy annuals of 1993 and 1994. Petrie eventually decided to retire with his final strip (a Minnie the Minx strip) appearing on 13 January 2001. The story consisted of Minnie meeting her former artist and bidding farewell. The strip was Petrie's 2000th and last, a tally for one artist drawing the same strip in the Beano only surpassed by David Sutherland on the Bash Street Kids.

In August 2011, DC Thomson asked him to come out of retirement to do a last strip, for the chance to see a "legend"'s strip again. They asked the Beano readers to send in their ideas for the strip. In the end it was "The Tummy Returns" featuring Fatty Fudge, suggested by William Clyde that got the one-off strip place.

Petrie died on 25 August 2014.
