= Tin-Can Tommy =

British comic strip

- Comic strip character(s) from The Beano

Publication information
- Creator(s): The Dinelli brothers
- Other contributors: Sam Fair; Charles Gordon; George Drysdale
- First appearance: Issue 1 (30 July 1938)
- Last appearance: issue 3185 (2003)
- Also appeared in: The Beano Annual
- Current status: Discontinued

Main Character
- Name: Tommy
- Family: Babe (sister); Clanky (pet); Ironsides (pet); Professor Lee (creator/father)

Tin-Can Tommy (The Clockwork Boy) was a comic strip in the UK comic The Beano, featuring Tommy, the clockwork 'son' of Professor Lee and his wife. He first appeared on the back page of issue 1, dated 30 July 1938, where we learn that he was built due to the death of their own son a year earlier (a concept which predates Astro Boy).

A few years later came the addition of a clockwork sister called Babe, a pet cat called Clanky, and a horse called Ironsides. The strip was created by the Italian Dinelli brothers, but they disappeared in France at the start of World War II. The strip was taken over by one of DC Thomson's own artists after issue 69 with new strips being drawn by Sam Fair, Charles Gordon and George Drysdale. The strip continued until issue No 303 in 1947.

In issue 3185 (dated August 2003) Tin Can Tommy met Bea, Dennis the Menace's baby sister for the comic's 65th anniversary.
