= Baby Face Finlayson =

Beano character

- Character from The Beano

Publication information
- Star of: Baby Face Finlayson
- Features in: Little Plum
- First appearance: Issue 1553; (22 April 1972)
- Last appearance: Issue 3660; (10 November 2012)
- Appearance timeline: Issues 1553 – 3660
- Author(s): Uncredited
- Illustrator(s): Emilios Hatjoullis; Kev F. Sutherland; Alexander Matthews; Ron Spencer

In-universe information
- Full name: "Baby Face" Finlayson
- Friends: Jessie James, Sid the Kid, Goo Goo McGoo
- Enemies: Sheriff "Marsh" Mallow of Cactus Gulch

Baby Face Finlayson is a fictional character in a comic strip in the UK comic The Beano, first appearing in issue 1553, dated 22 April 1972. Baby Face Finlayson "The Cutest Bandit in the West" is an outlaw from the American Old West, and is, in fact, a baby.

His name is derived from the real-life American gangster of the 1930s Baby Face Nelson (real name Lester Joseph Gillis).

== Publication history ==
He was originally a minor character in Little Plum, but was later given a spin-off strip of his own. He rode around in a motorised pram, stealing everything that wasn't tied down, whilst shouting "Yuk Yuk!". He had a number of accomplices, including Jessie James, Sid the Kid and Goo Goo McGoo who were also, apparently, babies. Their chief nemesis was Sheriff "Marsh" Mallow of Cactus Gulch.

When the strip returned in 1980, the Wild West theme was dropped, and the setting was moved to England. The tagline was also changed to "The Cutest Bandit Around". However, in the final strip of the second series, he was posted back to America by the angry Beano editor, whom Baby-Face had tried to kidnap. On both occasions, the strip was drawn by Ron Spencer.

== Subsequent appearances ==
In issue 3181, dated 5 July 2003, he cameoed in a Little Plum strip, when he stole Little Plum's wigwam. He sped off in his pram, crashed into a buffalo so Little Plum thought he had learned his lesson, until he steals Little Plum's clothes without him noticing and rides off. In September 2004 he reappeared again for five weeks in his own strip, this time drawn by Emilios Hatjoullis. He has appeared in the Beano Annual every year since then. In 2006 Baby Face returned as a villainous gangster in the Bash Street Kids adventures "School's Out" and "Hot Rod Cow", written and drawn by Kev F Sutherland. He appears in the 2008 Beano annual in the story "Pluggy Love", where Danny believes that Plug's girlfriend is evil as he thinks Baby-Face is her father. It turns out she's his babysitter and her father was pushing his pram. He appeared once again in the 2009 annual in "Reservoir Dodge", where after discovering a weather-predicting device Roger and Walter sold him is fake, he tries to kill them and invites a group of other fictional villains over, like the Joker, a Dalek, a devil, and Bully Beef. Other Beano characters try to help Roger, but are also placed above the piranha fish tank. However Alexander the Lemming and Winston the Cat push the tank over, forcing the villains away.

Baby-Face Finlayson returned to The Beano in the Funsize Funnies in #3660 drawn by Alexander Matthews.
