= Freddie Fear =

British comic strip

Freddie Fear – Son of a Witch
- Comic strip character(s) from The Beano

Publication information
- Current/last artist: Dave Eastbury
- First appearance: Issue 3103 (5 January 2002)
- Last appearance: 2012
- Also appeared in: The Beano Annual
- Current status: Discontinued

Main Character
- Family: Mrs. Fear (mother)

Characters
- Regular characters: Freddie Fear, Mrs. Fear

Freddie Fear is a fictional character who has his own comic strip in the UK comic The Beano, the tagline being Son of a Witch.

Freddie Fear is a normal boy, but he lives with his mother, a witch. Each week they show adventures, mainly Freddie trying to do something normal and then his mum comes along and makes it all magical. He has a couple of pet monsters. The strip first appeared in issue 3103, dated 5 January 2002, where Beano readers voted between it and two other comic strips (Phone-a-Fiend and Space Kidette) for which one they wanted to stay in the comic. Freddie's strip won. It is drawn by Dave Eastbury. Since his first appearance, he has grown less and less used to his mother's witchcraft and, if anything, he is frequently frustrated by the stupidity of his mother or the other spooks, such as getting annoyed with his mother for trying to bake cakes using spells (resulting in a lot of snakes being produced because his mother cannot spell).

Two panels from a Freddie Fear strip showing Freddie with his mother, Mrs. Fear

At the end of 2009, the artwork on the strip was given a revamp to match Dave Eastbury's new style on Ball Boy. Since then, Freddie has appeared noticeably smaller, and his head is more stretched out. His mother's appearance also changed, albeit to a lesser extent, and she began to wear a shorter dress. His story in the 2011 Beano Annual was drawn by Tom Paterson. However, his appearances in the comic became increasingly less regular during 2011. In October 2011, the strip returned as reprints from 2004, however, only two of these strips have been printed so far. On the Freddie Fear Beano page in 2012, it was confirmed that Freddie's series has ended.

However, Freddie Fear returned to Beano in edition 4306, dated 4 October 2025, for a 5-week Halloween story called, Five Frights at Freddie's, drawn by Nigel Parkinson.
