= Tom, Dick and Sally =

Comic strip characters from The Beano

- Characters from The Beano

Publication information
- Author(s): Uncredited
- Illustrator(s): Keith Reynolds; Robert Nixon; Steve Beckett (2014)
- First appearance: Issue 1735; (18 October 1975)
- Last appearance: Issue ?? (c. 2014)
- Group timeline: Issues 1735 – 2305

Characters
- Type of group: Family (siblings)
- Members of group: Tom; Dick; Sally
- Family: Mum; Ethel (aunt)

Tom, Dick and Sally was a comic strip in the UK comic The Beano between issue 1735 (dated 18 October 1975) and 2305 (20 September 1986). It was initially drawn by Dave Jenner, but Keith Reynolds drew it for much of its run. Robert Nixon is also known to have drawn a number of episodes. Tom and Dick repeatedly tried to offload their responsibilities onto their younger sister Sally, and enjoy an easy life at her expense. They nearly always failed and ended up worse-off than when they started. However, sometimes Sally lets them have the last laugh.

The strip is named after the phrase Tom, Dick and Harry. There was also a strip in The Beezer called Pop, Dick and Harry.

In 2014, Tom, Dick and Sally returned to The Beano as part of the Funsize Funnies drawn by Steve Beckett.

== Special guests ==
Singer-songwriter Joan Armatrading once appeared in a strip having a meal with Sally while the others looked in through the window.

The pop group Madness also once appeared as themselves. Singer Tom Jones and TV presenter Dickie Davies have also received mentions.
