= Little Plum =

British comic strip

- Comic strip character(s) from The Beano

Publication information
- Stars in: Little Plum
- Other names: The Legend of Little Plum
- Creator(s): Leo Baxendale
- Other contributors: Robert Nixon (artist); Ron Spencer (artist); Tom Paterson (artist); Claire Bartlett (writer); Andy Fanton (writer/artist); Stu Munro (writer)
- Current/last artist: Hunt Emerson
- First appearance: Issue 586 (10 October 1953)
- Last appearance: Issue 3773 (28 February 2015)
- Also appeared in: The Beano Annual
- Current status: Discontinued
- Spin-offs: Baby Face Finlayson , The Three Bears

Main Character
- Name: Little Plum Stealing Varmint
- Alias(es): Little Plum
- Friends: Chiefy, Hole in um Head, Pimple

Characters
- Type of group: Tribe
- Regular characters: Dr. Kildeer, Treaclefoot the horse, Pudding Bison

Little Plum (full name revealed to be Little Plum Stealing Varmint) is a British comedy western comics series about a little Native American, originally created by Leo Baxendale and published in the magazine The Beano.

== Concept ==
The eponymous hero and his friends Chiefy, Little Peach, Pimple and Hole-in-um-Head are members of the "Smellyfeet" American Indian tribe, who spend much of their time clashing with their rivals the "Puttyfeet" tribe. Other characters include Dr. Kildeer (the tribal medicine man), Treaclefoot (Plum's faithful horse) and Pudding Bison (a 'marvellous' creature who eats anything – also featuring in spin-off strips Baby Face Finlayson and The Three Bears).

== Character history ==
=== Original run (1953–1998) ===
Leo Baxendale created Little Plum in 1953 as a puny cartoon character in a dangerous cartoon world. It first appeared in issue 586, dated 10 October 1953. The comic strip employed a caricature of the English language spoken by American Indians, notably replacing the word "the" with "um". Baxendale dreamed him up, claiming he was a mixture of Hiawatha and Dennis the Menace and gave him to the editing team. "When I created Little Plum, I started him off as an amalgam of Dennis and Hiawatha, drawn in David Law's style, but after a while I realised this wasn't working," Baxendale recalled in 2010. "Fundamentally, it was because David's drawing was very stylistic, particularly the static mouth, which didn't work for what I had in mind. Plum had so many different thoughts going through his noddle that he needed constantly-changing expressions: a puny being in a world of vultures with knives and forks. Once I'd altered the mouth, we were away. It is very often a crux in a strip that you change something and it unleashes the comedy."

Unsure of the name, Baxendale gave it in to the then Beano editor under the working title 'Booster' before the strip was officially titled 'Little Plum, Your Redskin Chum'. They consisted of Plum, a ten-year-old member of the Smellyfoot tribe and the misadventures he got up to trying to prove himself a valuable member. After Baxendale left The Beano in 1962, Robert Nixon drew a few strips before Ron Spencer took over that same year. The strip originally finished in 1986, but it continued to appear in the Beano annuals up to 1994, and reappeared for a short time in 1998 under the name 'The Legend of Little Plum', drawn by Tom Paterson.

=== Hunt Emerson strips and later history (2002 – 2015) ===
From 2002 it has returned again under its original name, drawn by Hunt Emerson. The strip was finally dropped in 2006 when Hunt Emerson started drawing Ratz, though he has since appeared in BeanoMAX and in the 2009 Beano Annual. In Issue 3566, Little Plum returned to the comic once again, as reprints of Hunt Emerson's strips. However, all uses of the word "um" present when the strips originally appeared were removed in the reprinted versions. In autumn 2012, a new feature launched in the Beano called Funsize Funnies, each page of which features four single line strips. One of these is Little Plum, drawn by Laura Howell. Some episodes are written and drawn by Andy Fanton, an ex-Dandy artist. After a brief absence, Little Plum returned to The Beano every week as a 6 panel half page strip, drawn by Hunt Emerson and written by ex-Dandy artist Stu Munro after the pair collaborated on a revival of The Nibblers. The final weekly appearance of Little Plum ran in February 2015 with a full page strip parodying The Gruffalo. The character was then officially retired.

== Other appearances ==
- Little Plum was parodied in the bawdy comic magazine Viz with their character "Little Plumber".
