= Super School =

Comic strip by Lew Stringer

- Comic strip character(s) from The Beano

Publication information
- Current/last artist: Lew Stringer
- First appearance: Issue 34XX (November 2008)
- Also appeared in: The Beano Annual
- Current status: Discontinued

Characters
- Regular characters: Invisible Isobel, Safari Sam, Stinkbomb, Waterboy, Bananagirl, teacher

Super School is a comic strip, which started in November 2008 and is drawn by Lew Stringer. This strip was stated in the book The History of The Beano: The Story So Far as originally having the name The Ultras in the planning stages, and was inspired by the X-Men. The strip originally features four super powered children (which later became five) and their non-super powered Teacher. The pupils are Invisible Isobel, who as the name suggests can turn invisible; Safari Sam, a shapeshifter who can become any animal; Stinkbomb, who can create any aroma; Waterboy, who as the name suggests can control water (like the Marvel Comics villain Hydroman). During the comic strips run the class gained a new pupil Bananagirl, who is described by The Beano as "like Bananaman, only shorter". She can fly and is super strong, just like The Dandy's superhero. It was revealed on the Beano website that Bananagirl is Bananaman's niece, however, the comic itself has since contradicted this, instead saying that she is his cousin. In early strips, they were learning to use their abilities, but now most strips see them go on a mission, although sometimes these are just to help out Teacher.

After a hiatus throughout much of 2011, it has been confirmed by the strip's artist Lew Stringer that it will return to the comic in the near future. A one-off strip in January 2012 heralded Bananaman's arrival to the Beano.
