= Ping the Elastic Man =

British comic strip

- Character from The Beano

Publication information
- Star of: Here Comes Ping the Elastic Man
- First appearance: Issue 1; (30 July 1938)
- Last appearance: Issue 126; (21 December 1940)
- Appearance timeline: Issues 1 – 126
- Creator(s): Beano staff
- Author(s): Uncredited
- Illustrator(s): Hugh McNeill

Ping the Elastic Man (also named Here Comes Ping the Elastic Man) was a British comic strip that appeared in The Beano from 1938 to 1940. The comic was about a boy who could stretch his limbs as if they were made of elastic. It was created by Hugh McNeill.

== Background ==
Hugh McNeill responded to R. D. Low's newspaper ad hoping to be hired as a new artist for a developing comic. After samples of his work were sent to the Kayebon Press advertising agency, Low saw McNeill's potential and hired him immediately. The story of Ping was developed and McNeill began designing for the series, which was published in the first issue of The Beano.

In the early stages of development, Ping was called Indy and the strip was called "Indy the Rubber Man". McNeill's work allowed him to create other comic strips, most notably Pansy Potter.

== Common strips ==
Ping varied from being helpful to being too cocky for his own good. In the first issue, his boasting leads to people in the area playing with his limbs and dragging him out of shape. In another story, he uses his elastic arm to catch a vandal trying to break his elderly friend's fence.

== Declining appearances ==
McNeill would depart in the 1940s to join the Second World War. The comic was quietly discontinued after he left, although, like many Beano comic strips, Ping had Blitz-themed strips either encouraging the young readers to help the grown-ups, or mocking Nazis.

== Cameos ==
After an absence of several decades, he met Minnie the Minx in issue 3185, a special 65th Anniversary issue. His head and neck also appeared in the inner cover of the 2019 Beano Annual with 254 other characters.
