= Gnasher =

Comic strip character from The Beano

- Character from The Beano

Publication information
- Star of: Dennis the Menace (1968 – present); Gnasher's Tale (1977–1986); Gnasher and Gnipper (1986 – present); Gnasher's Bit(e) (2011–2014); Gnasher's Gnews (2012–2013); Gnipper (2013)
- First appearance: Issue 1362; (1968-08-31)
- Appearance timeline: Issues 1362 – 2279, 2286 – present
- Creator(s): Davey Law and Ian Gray
- Author(s): Uncredited

In-universe information
- Family: Gnipper (son); Gnatasha (daughter); Gnaomi (daughter); Gnanette (daughter); Gnorah (daughter); Gnancy (daughter)
- Friends: Dennis (owner); Bea (Dennis' sister)
- Enemies: Walter the Softy; Foo-Foo (Walter's dog); Any adult/authority figure; Dennis' mum; Dennis' dad

Also appeared in
- Beano works: The Beano Annual (1969 – present); The Beano Summer Special; BeanoMAX; Dennis the Menace Annual

Gnasher (/ˈnæʃər/) is a fictional comic strip character that appears in the British comic magazine The Beano. He is the pet dog of Dennis the Menace, who meets him in 1968's issue 1362, and is also the star of three spin-off comic strips. Gnasher is considered just as iconic as his owner as both have been the stars of many children's television programming and are the unofficial mascots of The Beano. Gnasher reached nationwide news in the 1980s after he disappeared from the magazine for seven weeks, returning with his six newborn puppies, but usually interacts with his son Gnipper.

== Development ==
Although Dennis the Menace was shown with a terrier in his first story, he would not meet Gnasher for 17 years. Dennis' artist Davey Law decided to give his character a dog companion but struggled to give the dog a perfect design, inspired by DC Thomson writer Jim Fowler mentioning reading a newspaper story about pets looking like their owners. Ian Gray suggested Law should "draw Dennis the Menace's hair, put a leg on each corner and two eyeballs at that end." Gray was a dog breeding hobbyist, and assisted with some of Gnasher's stories and for the stories in Pup Parade.

== Character background ==
Gnasher is a black-haired Abyssinian Wire-Haired Tripe Hound who often enjoys chewing and biting anyone and anything, grunting "gnash!" instead of barking. He was a bushy stray when Dennis found him just as Dennis grew interest in a local dog show. Dennis gives him the name "Gnasher" and encourages his misbehaviour. The two are inseparable, to the point the comic strip alternates between the titles Dennis the Menace, Dennis the Menace and Gnasher and Dennis and Gnasher.

Although the reader can read Gnasher's thoughts from the thought bubbles, other characters cannot understand him if he decides to talk in front of them (his dialogue usually represented with most words beginning with n having the (silent) letter g in front to represent his barks, e.g. "gnight"). (Note: Initially, this writing choice was not the case when Gnasher gained the ability to break the fourth wall, as panels in Gnasher's Tale design puppy Gnasher as never having this impediment. The first instance of a "gn" in that series was "Gnow!" in issue 1827.) Dennis can only understand him on Hallowe'en.

== "Who's Gnicked Gnasher?" publicity stunt ==
The Beano's sales ebbed throughout the 1980s, no longer selling millions of issues per week as it had thirty years prior. Aware of how audiences enjoyed watching Gnasher and Dennis' tight bond, sub-editor Alan Digby suggested a media prank that could cause a sales boost, leading to the seven-issue long "Where's Gnasher?" saga. It began in issue 2279, initially about Dennis outwitting a man with a giant bag of money from buying Gnasher, but Gnasher later disappeared without explanation and the story ended with Dennis standing alone in his back garden asking the reader if they would help him find Gnasher. The following issues would commonly begin with a panel of children holding Gnasher picket signs as Dennis and his family either joined the march or tried to cope with Gnasher's disappearance; Dennis also considers adopting a similar-looking replacement, and sets up traps to lure Gnasher back. Initially baffled by the town's search parties, Dennis' father starts to miss Gnasher when he realises he cannot pretend to spill his wife's terrible meals on the floor for Gnasher to eat when she is out of the room. Part 3 of the saga broke the fourth wall when Dennis decides to invite himself into DC Thomson's Beano offices and ask chief-editor Euan Kerr to help. Gnasher's departure would end in issue 2286 when Dennis and Walter find a pram full of puppies outside Dennis' front door, revealing he was caring for his son and five daughters. He reveals to the reader his children are named Gnorah, Gnatasha, Gnanette, Gnaomi, Gnancy and Gnipper.

== Star of his own stories ==
=== Gnasher's Tale ===
Gnasher's Tale
- Story from The Beano

Publication information
- First issue: Issue 1818; (21 May 1977)
- Last issue: Issue 2278; (31 May 1986)
- Genre: Comic strip
- Story timeline: Issues 1818 – 2278
- Main character(s): Gnasher, Dennis the Menace, Dennis' dad, with Dennis's mum, Curly, and Pie-Face

Story features in
- Beano works: The Beano Annual 1981, 1982, 1983, 1984, 1985, 1986, 1987, 1988, 2001, 2007; The Beano Summer Special 1983, 1985, 1986

After co-starring with his owner in Dennis the Menace and Gnasher for nine years, Gnasher would star in his own strip: Gnasher's Tale, a prequel series about Gnasher's life when he was a puppy. David Sutherland designed the series, encouraged to show off Gnasher's dynamic expressions, and his stories debuted in 1977's issue 1818.

Despite The Beano already establishing Dennis (and his family) met Gnasher when he was fully grown, Dennis is also portrayed as younger, and the first story showed his friend Curly wearing a bib and sucking a dummy. Each strip begins with a panel of Gnasher addressing the audience as he holds a book implied to contain the anecdote for the episode—its title initially Gnasher's Puphood, then changed to My Tale by Gnasher three strips later. The series changes the origin story to Dennis and his friends finding Gnasher in a bush, thinking Gnasher is a hairy worm because of his size. Dennis's father starts loathing Gnasher after Gnasher eats his dinner, and becomes determined to train the puppy, despite Gnasher's hyperactive behaviour provoking, humiliating and injuring him. A few stories imply he understands Gnasher, showing him react to Gnasher's anthropomorphic responses and the two violently arguing at times. Other cameos include Dennis' mum and a younger Walter, as Gnasher does not hold back from tormenting them as well for his amusement or to get his own way. Other stories are about "Gnasher's firsts", showing him at his first haircut and vet visit, and when he first learnt how strong his teeth are.

The series was eventually cancelled after issue 2278, in the wake of the "Where's Gnasher?" saga. Its section was replaced by Foo Foo's Fairy Story, also illustrated by Dave Sutherland, starring Walter's dog Foo-Foo. When Gnasher reunited with Dennis, Gnasher's Tale remained cancelled, but would feature in Beano annuals illustrated by Barry Glennard, and in Dandy and Beano: The Golden Years, Volume II.

=== Gnasher and Gnipper ===
Gnasher and Gnipper
- Story from The Beano

Publication information
- First issue: Issue 2286; (1 November 1986)
- Genre: Comic strip
- Main character(s): Gnasher, Gnipper, Dennis, Dennis' mum, Dennis' dad, Gnasher's daughters

Story features in
- Beano works: The Beano Annual 1989, 1990; The Beano Summer Special 1987, 1988, 1989

In the same issue Gnasher returned, Gnasher and Gnipper debuted, replacing Gnasher's Tale. This series was set in the present day, showing Gnasher bonding with his only son, usually chasing cats and postmen, pestering Foo-Foo, and finding some sausages to eat. Dennis and his family sometimes featured. Around each other, Gnasher and Gnipper communicate through speech bubbles anthropomorphically, but the dialogue is placed back in thought bubbles around human characters, implying the humans cannot understand them. Occasionally, one of Gnipper's sisters make an appearance to help with a scheme, but most stories usually feature the protagonists irritating adults.

David Sutherland illustrated until 1993 and was succeeded by Barry Glennard. The series declined throughout the 2000s as The Beano prepped for the new Dennis the Menace cartoon and did not return until 2014. Its recent artist is Barrie Appleby, with scripts by Danny Pearson and JD Savage. Gnasher and Gnipper has featured in The Beano Annual, The Beano Summer Special and in issue 168 of the Beano Comic Library.

=== Gnasher's Bit(e) ===
Gnasher received a solo series again in 2011 with Gnasher's Bit(e), illustrated by Jimmy Hansen and then Barrie Appleby, authored by an uncredited Ryan C. Gavan. It ended in January 2014.

=== Funsize Funnies shorts ===
==== Gnipper ====
Gnasher's son received his own, eponymous three-panel gag-a-day in Beano's Funsize Funnies section from January to July 2013, with artwork by Canadian artist Graham Howie.

==== Gnash Gnews ====
Gnash Gnews was a mini-strip which featured in Funsize Funnies from issues 3660 to 3681, illustrated by Barrie Appleby.

== Reception and legacy ==
Although "Who's Gnicked Gnasher?" failed to resurrect The Beano's sales in the long term, the saga received nationwide attention. Distraught readers telephoned and wrote to DC Thomson to both voice their worry for Gnasher's safety or help look for clues, and The Dennis the Menace club sold Gnasher badges to identify other readers also helping Dennis. Radio presenter Mike Read broadcast the news on his BBC Radio 1 show (which was dramatised in issue 2281), and newspapers like The Times reported the disappearance frequently. The series would be reprinted in the 1990 Dennis the Menace Annual as a 16-page story entitled Who's Gnicked Gnasher? The Beano re-created the saga in 2014, in which Dennis would ask Bear Grylls to help with the search.

Gnasher's debut appearance featured in Royal Mail's commemorative Dennis the Menace 70th anniversary stamps. Gnatasha had her own strip in The Beezer and Topper, and appeared in the 1994 Beezer Book.
