= Minnie the Minx =

British comic strip character

- Comic strip character(s) from The Beano

Publication information
- Stars in: Minnie the Minx
- Creator(s): Leo Baxendale
- Other contributors: Nigel Parkinson; Tom Paterson; Ken Harrison; Iain McLaughlin; Carvan Scott; Danny Pearson; Andy Fanton
- Current/last artist: Leo Baxendale; Jim Petrie; Tom Paterson; Ken Harrison; Laura Howell
- First appearance: Issue 596 (19 December 1953)
- Also appeared in: The Beano Annual; Dennis the Menace and Gnasher
- Current status: Ongoing
- Schedule: Weekly

Main Character
- Name: Hermione Makepeace
- Alias(es): Minnie the Minx; The Minx; Minxie; Min; The World's Wildest Tom Boy
- Family: Dad; Mum; Michael, Martin, Mark, Morris and Max (older brothers); Chester the cat (pet)
- Friends: Fatty Fudge

Characters
- Regular characters: Soppy Susan, The Haarm twins, Minnie's teacher
- Other characters: PC Thyme, PC Pimples
- Crossover characters: Dennis the Menace, Roger the Dodger, The Bash Street Kids,

Minnie the Minx is a comic strip character published in the British comic magazine The Beano. Created and originally drawn by Leo Baxendale to be a female version of Dennis the Menace, she first appeared in issue 596, dated 19 December 1953, making her the third longest running Beano character behind Dennis the Menace and Roger the Dodger. She would later be drawn by Jim Petrie, Tom Paterson, Ken H. Harrison and Laura Howell. She would also appear in animated films.

Minnie is depicted as a tomboy, with a real name of Hermione Makepeace

Like Desperate Dan from The Dandy, she has a statue in Dundee. In 2021, Minnie the Minx featured on a commemorative UK postage stamp issued by the Royal Mail to mark 70 years of Dennis the Menace.

== Character history ==
=== Leo Baxendale strips (1953–1962) ===
Minnie the Minx, created and drawn by Leo Baxendale, first appeared in The Beano in December 1953. Her first strip introduced her as "wild as wild can be" and showed her exasperated mother attempting to get her to be more creative rather than fight. Taking a book, Minnie then proceeds to beat her classmates during a revenge scheme using the scrapbook as a weapon. The closing panel shows her thanking her mother for the scrapbook stating she has "won nine scraps with it." Most of Minnie's earlier strips consisted of six-panel boxes; however, as her popularity grew, it quickly became more plausible to give Minnie her own full page with added colour. This introduced her trademark flaming red hair and red and black jersey. Like many other Beano stars at the time, many of her later strips showed Minnie to get her comeuppance towards the end be it a cane, slipper or simply a case of karma. Minnie also appeared alongside Dennis the Menace in his own strip in the edition of 23 January 1954 of The Beano. In the strip, she swapped toys with Dennis for the day as she received his trusty catapult and he proceeded to 'menace' with her doll's pram. In the end, she got out of trouble scot free whilst Dennis had to suffer for all her minxing. It was possibly this that began their future eternal rivalry.

=== Jim Petrie strips (1962–2001) ===
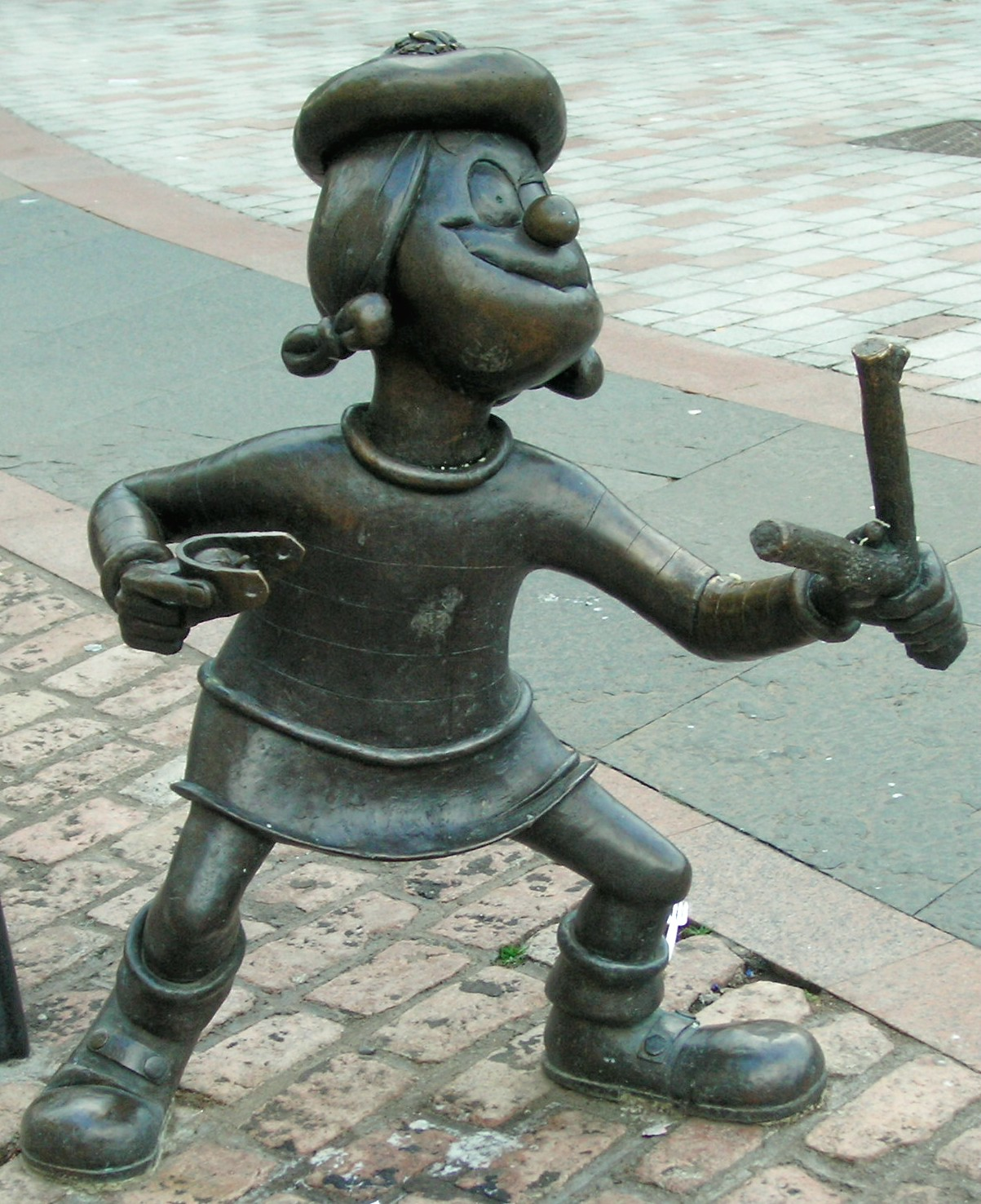
Statue in Dundee

In 1962, when Baxendale left D.C. Thomson, a new artist was taken on to continue Minnie's adventures. Young art teacher Jim Petrie was given the opportunity. His first strip, coincidentally, started similarly to Baxendale's in that Minnie is seen being asked by her mother to read rather than minx. Much to her mother's dismay, Minnie's chosen book influences her to take up red Indian traditions in which she gets up to much mischief. In the end, however, after aggravating a sleeping bull, Minnie is caught by a farmer and taken home to be slippered by her father. Despite the pain, it appears Minnie still attempts to ensure to the public that she is still an Indian stating her name is 'Minnie – Ha!'. She appeared once again alongside Dennis in issue 1894, in which she states that Dennis' famous jersey is actually her trademark, so he has no right to call them 'Dennis Jerseys'.

The Beano's 50th Anniversary issue in 1988 was significant, as an increase in the number of colour pages in the comic led to Minnie appearing in full colour for the first time. In the strip itself, Minnie dressed up as Pansy Potter in compliance with the editor's wishes. Throughout the strip she attempts impossible feats in hope to appear just like Pansy. This even consists of attempting to sink war submarines, something the old character used to do during The Beano's war times. Despite the fact she is weaker than Pansy, Minnie does manage to withhold four sailors before they finally manage to catch her and tie her up leaving her before her father. However, previously she had filled her father's jumper with balloons and using Pansy's unique hairstyle, manages to burst the balloons causing her father to flee home in the nude, the thought of punishing his daughter forgotten.

Minnie also made a cameo in the 1992 Beano Annual story, "Dennis Through The Beano Book", in which she played the Queen of Hearts. She has also been the star of several Beanotown pantomimes, playing the role of Cinderella in each.

With the turn of the new century, Minnie was featured in a feature-length strip alongside Dennis the Menace, Roger the Dodger and The Bash Street Kids. The plot revolved around treasure which was apparently buried sometime near the end of the 19th century. Minnie was called over to Dennis' house by Roger who had gained a copy of the Treasure Map due to Smiffy, the dipsy member of The Bash Street Kids, leaving the original in the photocopier machine in Beanotown Library. Upon finding out The Bash Street Kids were also hunting for the treasure, the trio followed them to London. Once the mystery had unfolded that the treasure was buried deep in the Millennium Dome, the Bash Street Kids instantly found it and celebrated their victory. However, Dennis attempts to intimidate the treasure off Fatty but he quickly flattened leaving Minnie and Roger to chase after Danny, who had just run off with the treasure. Finding him hiding in a storage cupboard, Roger forms a plan to get Danny to duel with Dennis for the treasure. Whilst all seems fair at first, it is quickly discovered that the three menaces had no intent on fair play when it comes to treasure and it is revealed that Roger had in fact tied Danny's catapult to a piece of string, thus yanking it away at a pinnacle moment. Appearing to have won, the trio leave a humiliated Danny and head home. However, a plot quickly unravels that Roger wasn't the only one who was intent on unfair play. Danny had switched the treasure with pebbles whilst he was hiding in the storage cupboard. Alongside Dennis, Minnie chased Roger through the streets of Beanotown, giving Danny the opportunity to switch the treasure.

Minnie also attended Dennis the Menace's 50th Birthday House Party. Like the other guests, Minnie bought Dennis a Beano Annual 2001. She participated in all menacing party games but, due to her friendship with Dennis, she was one of few to not get menaced. She can also be seen fighting in the final food fight and twirling her beret when the celebrities and Dandy characters arrive.

Petrie decided to retire, with his final strip appearing on 13 January 2001. The story consisted of Minnie meeting her former artist and bidding farewell. The strip was Petrie's 2000th and last, a tally for one artist drawing the same strip in the Beano, only surpassed by David Sutherland on the Bash Street Kids.

=== Tom Paterson strips (2001–2008) ===
The following week, Calamity James artist Tom Paterson took over the strip, adding his own distinct trademarks and ideas on Minnie's canon. In 2003, Brain Duane from The Dandy visited Beanotown and proceeded to mock Minnie for her lack of intelligence. Choosing brawn over brains and fuelled with jealousy over Duane's new gadget-filled car, Minnie threatened Duane into making her a custom-built skateboard. The next week, after asking to meet Dennis she proceeds to minx him with her new weapon-filled vehicle. This causes Dennis to get his revenge the next week with his own Menace Buggy. It was revealed in succeeding issues that this, along with several other strips from around the same time, was a buildup to a brand new PC Game Beanotown Racing. She appeared as a playable character in the video game upon its release date in 2003.

Initially Paterson drew the vast majority of strips, with the occasional story drawn by Keith Reynolds, but, by 2003, other artists, such as Leslie Reavey, began to ghost the strip due to Tom Paterson's workload. Through 2004 and 2005, ghosted strips became increasingly common, and eventually, in early 2006, Steve Horrocks took up the artistic duties. However, in the autumn of that year, Paterson returned to the strip, but in a different style, the most notable change being that Minnie's Parents appeared to look very similar to those of Sweeney Toddler. The following year, Tom Paterson's style changed again, and the changes made to her parents were largely reversed, although Minnie's Dad's moustache was still absent. In October 2007, Minnie's jumper changed colour from her familiar black and red stripes to red and yellow, with her skirt also changing from black to blue. This style was also seen on the cover of the 1965 Beano book.

=== Ken Harrison strips (2008–2012) ===
Minnie as she appears in the Ken Harrison strips

By 2007, Minnie was struggling in the readers' poll and, in early 2008, several significant changes were made in response to this. Iain McLaughlin took over as writer and, in Beano issue 3422, dated 15 March 2008, former Desperate Dan artist Ken Harrison took over as the strip's artist. Harrison re-introduced many aspects of Leo Baxendale's original depiction of the character and reverted her jumper to its original colours. However, the style of writing changed, with McLaughlin placing greater emphasis on the relationship between Minnie and her Dad. Some minor changes were made to her appearances, with her standard brown or grey school shoes replaced with the more modern trainers. A new tagline was introduced, citing Minnie as the World's Wildest Tom Boy, similar to Dennis the Menace's original tagline of being the World's Wildest Boy. Minnie's Teacher also became a regular character during this time, and Minnie now attends what appears to be an all-girls school. The changes reinvigorated the strip as Minnie soon returned to a top four position in the poll.

Although Harrison has been the main artist throughout this time, when he has been unavailable to draw the strip, the main ghost artist has been Laura Howell. Since 2009, occasional Jim Petrie reprints have been used, particularly during the postal strikes in autumn 2009.

In the summer of 2010, Minnie began a quest for fame which received a lot of media attention in the UK. Cheryl Cole, who was spotted sporting a red and black dress in her music video, was featured as well as Wayne Rooney and Jamie Oliver. Each attempt landed Minnie in more trouble than the last so, in her final strip, she decided to give up the search for fame and instead continue her day-to-day minxing.

On 30 July 2011, Minnie and several of her Beano co-stars were a part of a UK advertising campaign for National Trust. This included a special of The Beano which included a comic strip of her and her father exploring Northern Ireland for Finn McCool and the Giant's Causeway.

In November 2012, Minnie loses her second page as it is reserved for Funsize Funnies (Gnash Gnews, Little Plum, Winston and Rasher)

=== Current Strips (2012–present) ===
Ken Harrison drew his last Minnie the Minx strip in November 2012, drawing the first Minnie story reduced down to a single page. The week after, Nigel Parkinson took over and both wrote and drew the strip from then on. He confirmed that he was the new Minnie artist some months later, on his blog. For the 75th anniversary special, Minnie the Minx met Andy Murray in a tennis battle. Minnie also met Harry Hill, Jeremy Clarkson and Matt Smith (plus others) in the 2013 Comic Relief special. During Parkinson's time he tried to surprise the readers by never following a script template and allowing Minnie's character to dictate storylines. In 2013, Minnie stories went back up to two pages, with Nigel Parkinson and Paul Palmer and, later in 2015, Cavan Scott writing the scripts.

In 2018, as the Beano celebrated an eightieth anniversary, there was a collector's edition magazine- Minnie – 65 Years of Minxing. Laura Howell began drawing Minne in 2018, the first woman to draw Minnie. As of 4 April 2021, her work has appeared in 127 Beano issues.

== Personality traits ==
Minnie is known as a typical tomboy, preferring mischievous and violent antics over those that would be normal for a typical girl her age. As opposed to Dennis' boisterous menacing methods, Minnie favours a more impish style of causing trouble which she refers to as 'minxing'. Despite this, she is still keen to get into brawls much like her other fellow Beano characters. She also seems to have a distinct hatred for snob-like behaviour and spoilt children. Minnie can be deemed as hyperactive as evident in several strips which show her destroying furniture in her home or a shop whilst playing one of her games. She also considers herself to be a rebel citing she hates people telling her what to do.

=== Rivalries and friendships ===
Minnie has had a problem with many of her neighbours. One example is a baby called Delilah, who had a snob of a mother. She got Minnie plenty of punishments, including extra baths. Minnie defeated her by tricking her into eating a frighteningly hot curry and embarrassing her mother. The mother had just entered Delilah in a baby contest. The curry effect on Delilah happened at the time her boastful mother had arranged for a journalist to take her photo. Her mother was similar to another mother called "Mrs Proudpants" who was boasting about her baby who she said was sure to win the contest, just like Delilah's mother. She also appears to have a small rivalry with The Bash Street Kids, as shown in feature-length strips drawn by Mike Pearse. However, she seems to be on friendly terms with the female member, Toots.

Minnie, like most characters, is depicted as a loner; however, she is shown to have a friendship with Dennis the Menace and Roger the Dodger, often seen teaming up with them in crossovers and occasionally with them in the background. Some strips have even hinted at her having a crush on Dennis and a flash-forward in the Beano Annual of 2006 revealed that Dennis and Minnie eventually get married, though the canonicity of this story is debatable and the two have yet to pursue a romantic interest in one another in the regular strips. This was retconned however, as the two of them are now cousins.

== Other characters in the strip ==
=== Minnie's family ===
Like most DC Thomson characters, Minnie's parents are not normally mentioned by name and are referred to simply as Minnie's dad and Minnie's mum. However, in issue 2258 (dated 26 October 1985), her dad reveals that his name is 'Victor'. In a later issue, one of his colleagues addresses him as 'Mr Minx'. In the Beano Videostars, his boss says that Minnie's Dad's name is George. In one issue, Dennis's Dad calls him Malcom. Whether any of these names can be considered 'official' is unclear. As of 2021, the Beano website states that her parents are named Darren and Vicky Makepeace, and that Vicky is the older sister of Sandra Menace, making Dennis and Minnie cousins.

Chester is Minnie's pet cat. Chester has occasionally been seen in separate strips alongside fellow feline Beano characters Dodgecat (Roger the Dodger's pet cat) and Winston (from the Bash Street Kids).

=== Other children ===
Soppy Susan, a character similar to Dennis the Menace's Walter the Softy but a girl. The character appeared during Jim Petrie's time as the artist and has recently returned to the strip, as well as appearing in the 2015 Beano annual.

The Haarm twins, two twins who often tease Minnie but usually end up being beaten up by her. The characters began appearing in the 2000s and appear irregularly.

Francis "Fatty" Fudge, as his name suggests, is a fat child. He is also sometimes called upon to assist Minnie in a particularly elaborate plot since his services can always be bought with a bag of sweets. He was briefly the subject of a spin-off strip in the early 1990s that parodied famous films, usually in ways involving the character's love of food (examples including 'You Only Eat Rice' and '20,000 Leeks Under The Sea').

=== Other characters ===
PC Thyme is a policeman similar to Dennis the Menace's Sergeant Slipper but this character pre-dates him. This character like the aforementioned Soppy Susan mainly appeared during Jim Petrie's time as artist however a similar character appeared during Tom Paterson's time as the Minnie artist called PC Pimple this character was similar to PC Thyme but as the name suggests had pimples.

Minnie's Teacher is as the name suggests Minnie's teacher this character is one of the newest recurring characters in the strip only appearing since Ken Harrison took over as the artist. It was revealed in Issue 3636 that she was 31.

== Reception and legacy ==
Since her debut in 1953, Minnie has been hallowed as a national treasure amongst British children for generations. Long considered one of the readers' favourite characters, she was created during what many fans feel is the Beano's golden age where other famous characters, such as Dennis the Menace and Roger the Dodger, were created. Alongside the Dandy's Desperate Dan, she was given her own statue in Dundee in 2001 (part of the Dundee Public Art Programme). She was also featured in the line-up of McDonald's happy meal toys in Britain and has several models and figurines. As well as featuring on much of the Beano Merchandise, such as T-shirts and figures, Minnie is often featured in the comic's countless spin-offs such as videos, annuals and video games.

== In other media ==
Title	Directed by	Written by	Minnie portrayed by
The Beano Video (1993, ITV) The Beano Videostars (1994, ITV)	Terry Ward	Richard Everett; Terry Ward	Susan Sheridan Nicola Stapleton

=== Videos ===
- Minnie appeared in the direct to video release The Beano Video in 1993, alongside other famous Beano characters. It was re-titled 'The Beano All-Stars' when ported onto DVD. Minnie was voiced by Susan Sheridan. It was aired on ITV.
- Minnie was also included in the direct to Video release The Beano Videostars in 1994. In the film, the Beano stars were invited to a premiere of an all-new Beano feature getting up to mischief along the way. Minnie was voiced by Nicola Stapleton. It was aired on ITV.

=== Video games ===
- Minnie is a playable character in Beanotown Racing using her customised skateboard as a vehicle.

=== Theme parks ===
- Minnie was a Meet & Greet character in the Beano Land section in Chessington World of Adventures from its opening in 2000 until it was re-furbished into Wild Asia in 2009. Her silhouette could be seen alongside other characters in the main entrance and her image was posted around different areas of the land. She was also featured on the trademark water fountain which would spray water at unsuspecting guests at random intervals.

=== TV Show ===
In 2018, it was announced that Minnie would appear in her own live-action TV show, called The Magnificent Misadventures of Minnie written by Danielle Ward. As of 2024, the show has not been released, presumed cancelled.

== See also ==
- Beryl the Peril
- Dennis the Menace (UK)
- Fatty Fudge
