= John Geering =

British cartoonist

- Born: John Keith Geering; 9 March 1941 Latchford, Warrington, United Kingdom
- Died: 13 August 1999 (aged 58) Warrington, United Kingdom
- Areas: Writer, Editor
- Notable works: Bananaman, ( with Steve Bright)

John Keith Geering (9 March 1941 – 13 August 1999) was a British cartoonist with a distinctive, occasionally flamboyant style, most famous for his work for DC Thomson comics including Sparky, The Topper, Cracker, Plug, Nutty, The Beano and The Dandy.

Geering's strips included:

- Puss 'n' Boots (Sparky/Topper/Dandy), a more anarchic, surreal take on the traditional cat-and-dog strips, complete with bizarre dialogue and situations - Boots, for example, having taken a gardening job, boasts that the perks include "all the grass I can eat", whilst Puss can be found selling ice cream at the North Pole.
- Smudge (Beano), correctly billed as the world's dirtiest schoolboy, relishing any opportunity to get covered in grime and filth that presents itself.
- Bananaman (Nutty/Dandy/Beano), a bungling superhero whose alter-ego is a stubble-headed schoolboy. This character proved particularly popular during its run in Nutty, and spawned an animated television series voiced by Bill Oddie, Tim Brooke-Taylor and Graeme Garden. The strip continued in The Dandy, first drawn by John Geering and then by other artists following his death. Bananaman Geering reprints briefly ran in The Beano from January 2012.

He worked at Cosgrove Hall animation studios in Manchester on Danger Mouse, Count Duckula, and the 1989 film The BFG based on the 1982 novel of the same name by Roald Dahl.

Geering's last new strip was Dean's Dino, which he drew for The Beano shortly before his death. He also produced topical and political satire cartoons for British newspapers.

He had lived in the village of Comberbach with his wife for many years before his death.

He died in Warrington, aged 58.
