= Laura Howell =

British artist

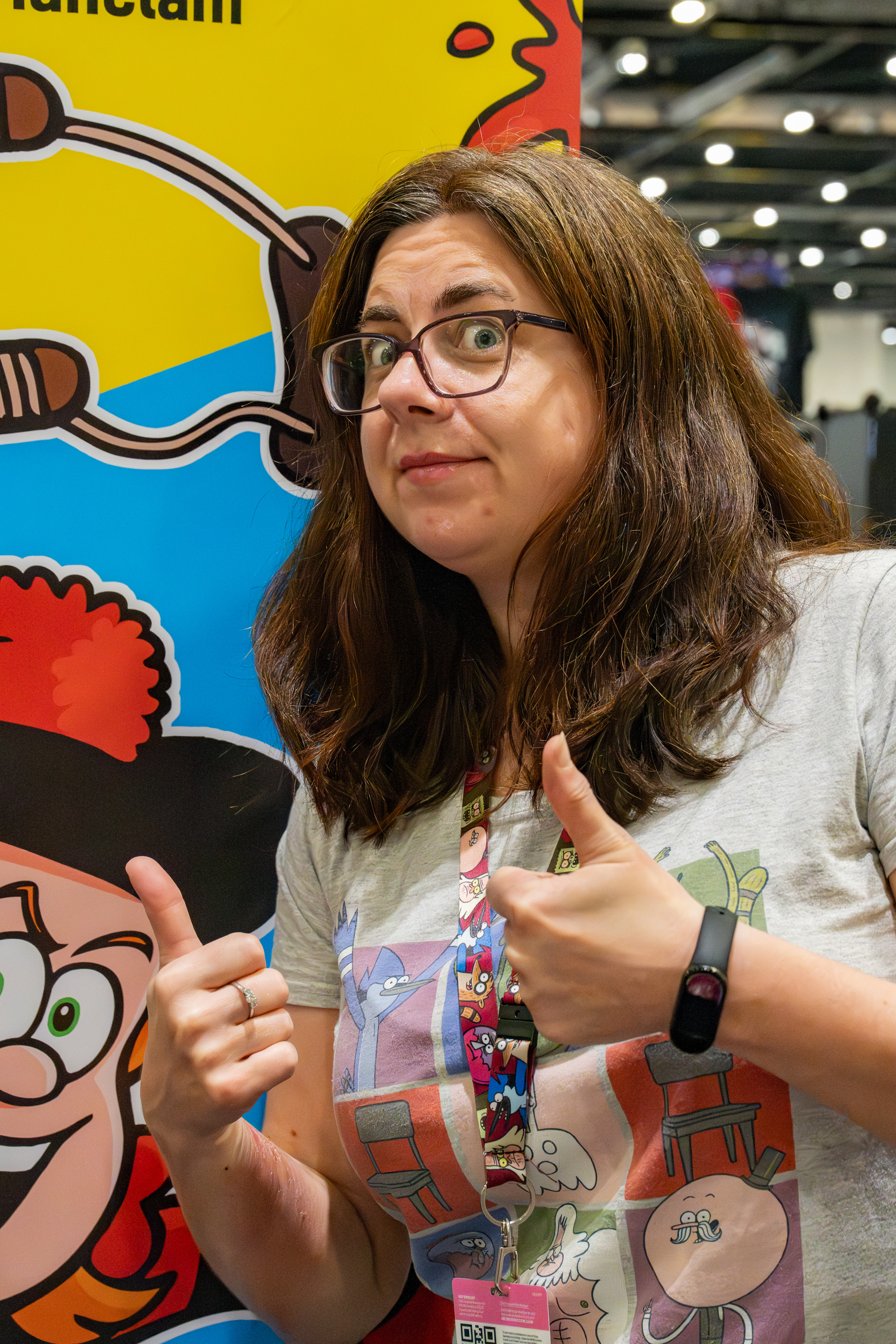
At MCM Comic Con London 2025

Laura Howell is a British comic strip artist. She is the first female artist in the history of The Beano comic, and is responsible for Johnny Bean from Happy Bunny Green, Les Pretend, Tricky Dicky and the manga adaptation of The Beano. She also drew Billy the Cat in the Special 70 Years Beano, and two Minnie the Minx strips in the same comic. Laura also works for Toxic magazine, drew the comic strip "Sneaky, the world's cleverest elephant" for the DFC comic, and is a manga artist. Her works includes a manga-stylized version of Gilbert and Sullivan. In 2006, she was awarded the International Manga and Anime Festival (IMAF) Best Comic Prize. She has also contributed to a number of publications, including Viz and Mad (magazine). She lives in Birmingham, England.
