= The Beano Annual =

Yearly children's comic book series

- The cover of "The Beano Book 1972"

Publication information
- Publisher: D.C. Thomson & Co
- Schedule: Annual
- Format: Children's
- Genre: Comic strips
- Publication date: 1940–present
- No. of issues: 86 (as of 2024)
- Main character: Dennis the Menace and Gnasher

Creative team as of 2015
- Written by: D.C. Thomson
- Editor: D.C. Thomson

The Beano Annual is the current name of the book that has been published every year since 1939, to tie in with the children's comic The Beano. As of 2024, there have been 86 editions. The annuals are traditionally published in July or August, in time for Christmas, and since 1965, they have had the date of the following year on the cover. Before then, no date was given.

From 1943 to 1950, the annual was called "The Magic-Beano Book", which referred to the short-lived Magic Comic that had ceased publication in 1941 due to the Second World War's paper rationing. The name reverted to the original title of "The Beano Book" in 1950 and continued, the year changing for each subsequent annual, until the release of the 2003 book in 2002 when it was renamed "The Beano Annual". The 2011 Beano Annual is taller and wider than previous annuals.

After paper rationing had ended, The Magic Comic was never revived, but some of the characters who had originally appeared in the pre-war Magic Comic remained as regular strips in the post-1950 Beano Comic (such as Koko the Pup).

Because of his popularity, Dennis the Menace has appeared on the front cover of every annual since the release of the 1979 book in 1978.

The latest version came out in 2024 and was dated 2025. The book consistently retails at 6.99 from 2024. (released 2023)

== List of annuals ==
This information is necessary to identify older annuals, which are not dated. If an annual is dated 1940, it would have been published in August 1939.

Prices are in shillings and pence with one shilling (1/-) equal to 5p. Modern equivalent prices (not inflation-adjusted) are given in brackets.

=== The Beano Book (1940–1942) ===
| Year | Cover image | Cover price |
|---|---|---|
| 1940 | Big Eggo and all the other (then-current) characters are sitting on a seesaw, which is supported by Pansy Potter. | 2/6 (12.5p) |
| 1941 | All the then-current characters are emerging from gigantic eggs with Big Eggo's head peering onto the right side. | 3/- (15p) |
| 1942 | All the then-current characters are dancing around the spinning Big Eggo – with Lord Snooty playing the bagpipes. | 3/6 (17.5p) |

=== The Magic-Beano Book (1943–1950) ===
| Year | Cover image | Cover price |
|---|---|---|
| 1943 | Big Eggo and Koko the Pup are having a three-legged race with all the other characters running behind them. (The "Magic" in the book's name refers to The Magic Comic which is where Koko the Pup had originated back in 1939) | 5/- (25p) advertised as 5/6 (27.5p) |
| 1944 | Big Eggo and Koko the Pup are having a pillow fight on a balance beam and it looks like Eggo is going to sneeze. | 6/- (30p) |
| 1945 | Big Eggo and all the other (then-current) characters are playing leapfrog as they approach a pool full of water. | 6/- (30p) |
| 1946 | Big Eggo pulls all the other then-current characters along in a cart, as Koko holds a horseshoe in front of him. | 6/- (30p) |
| 1947 | All the (then-current) characters are gathered around Big Eggo, who has something spherical stuck in his throat. | 6/- (30p) |
| 1948 | Big Eggo and all the other then-current characters are playing musical instruments. (Koko plays a series of strings tied to Eggo's neck, as if they were a harp, while Eggo himself plays a drum as this was around the time he was given arms and hands). | 6/- (30p) |
| 1949 | Biffo the Bear and Koko are fighting in front of a taxi, while all the other characters are trying to stop them. | 6/- (30p) |
| 1950 | Biffo the Bear is painting a portrait of Big Eggo and all the other (then-current) characters on a large canvas. | 6/- (30p) |

=== The Beano Book (1951–2002) ===
| Year | Cover image | Cover price |
|---|---|---|
| 1951 | Biffo is riding upon Tick-Tock Tony, the Clock-Work Horse, who was based upon The Horse that Jack Built. | 6/- (30p) |
| 1952 | Biffo is nailing pictures of many other then-current Beano characters (including Pansy Potter, Maxy's Taxi, Tom Thumb, The Laughing Pirate, Tick-Tock Tony and Lord Snooty) to the cover. A jar of Magic Lollipops is also present below the book's name. | 6/- (30p) |
| 1953 | Jack Flash is taking all the other characters on a trip to the Moon (Biffo the Bear is grabbing on to his back). | 6/- (30p) |
| 1954 | Biffo is hanging from a tree, Dennis is holding a lobster near his foot (this was the first Beano annual to feature him on the cover), and a monkey is sawing the branch Biffo is hanging from. In the background, Buster watches (from behind a barrel). | 6/- (30p) |
| 1955 | A policeman is trying to stop Biffo from fishing, but an arrow with a glove on it, a boot and a horseshoe (that are flying into view from the left side) knock him over the edge of the pool (however, he has not actually fallen in, and is in mid-air). | 6/- (30p) |
| 1956 | Biffo is acting as General Jumbo with all the other then-current characters acting as the radio-controlled army. | 6/- (30p) |
| 1957 | Dennis kicks a football, which bounces off all the other then-current characters like a pinball and into a goal. | 6/6 (32.5p) |
| 1958 | Biffo is doing a juggling act, and a swarm of bees (which have been released from their hive by Dennis and Minnie; this is the first Beano annual to feature her at full size on the cover, as she was miniaturized for 1956 one) are flying towards him. | 6/6 (32.5p) |
| 1959 | Biffo the Bear watches Dennis, as he plays a game of leapfrog with Little Plum, and a goat is about to butt him. | 6/6 (32.5p) |
| 1960 | Biffo is completing a jigsaw puzzle of the Bash Street Kids, which shows an angry dog chasing after the Teacher. | 7/- (35p) |
| 1961 | The comic's title is displayed in large letters – with pictures of Dennis, Danny, Wilfrid, Little Plum, Toots, Roger, Plug, and upside-down Smiffy on the top; and Jonah, Minnie, Biffo, Sidney, Fatty, Kat and the Bash Street Teacher (with Kanary on his nose) below. This cover appeared on the endpapers of the 2004 The Broons special book ("The 1960s Revisited"). | 7/6 (37.5p) |
| 1962 | Front: Jonah (with a seagull perched on his head) is dancing on the mast of a sinking ship, with an "SOS" flag on it, and his hat is on the word "BOOK", while two fish are looking at him with shocked faces. Back: Jonah is wearing a vest and shorts while sitting on a giant turtle and playing a harmonica, and his clothes are on the mast like a flag, as the turtle looks surprised. | 7/6 (37.5p) |
| 1963 | The Bash Street Kids are sitting on a giant swing which is tied to the comic's name (Danny is reading the book). | 7/6 (37.5p) |
| 1964 | Front: Biffo is holding up a barbell (which represents the two letters "OO" in "BOOK") and Buster is tickling him with a feather, while Dennis, the Three Bears, Jonah, Minnie, Roger and the Bash Street Kids are watching them. Back: As a result of Buster and his tickling, Biffo drops the barbell on Buster's head – which would most likely have been lethal if he was a real person. | 7/6 (37.5p) |
| 1965 | Front: Little Plum and Minnie the Minx (the latter is wearing a red-and-yellow striped jumper) are blowing up a giant balloon which is shaped like Biffo's head. Back: A hedgehog passes them, and its spikes burst the balloon on pricking it. | 7/6 (37.5p) |
From 1966 all annuals were dated
| 1966 | Front: Biffo is spinning a giant drum (which has the book's title on it) with his feet. Back: Biffo walks away while rolling the drum and says "Bye, Bye". Like the Dandy Annual of the year, it is the first to be dated. | 8/6 (42.5p) |
| 1967 | General Jumbo is controlling the other characters (Dennis, Biffo, Minnie, Roger, The Bash Street Kids, Lord Snooty and The Three Bears) with his radio control, and Danny (from the Bash Street Kids) is holding a red balloon, which has "1967" upon it. | 8/6 (42.5p) |
| 1968 | Biffo is wearing a crash helmet (which has "1968" on it) and Dennis, Minnie (who is wearing a black-and-yellow striped jumper), and Roger (who is wearing a red-and-yellow checked jumper), are throwing snowballs at him from in the background. | 78/6 (42.5p) |
| 1969 | The Bash Street Kids ride on the Iron Fish as it flies over their Teacher (who'd hooked it) in his fishing boat. | 8/6 (42.5p) |
| 1970 | Biffo is carrying a giant ice lolly which has the book's name upon it (the Bash Street Kids are in the background). | 8/6 (42.5p) |
| 1971 | Biffo is holding a picture frame up in front of himself, as if he was a portrait (four actual portraits of Dennis, Minnie, and Bash St.'s Smiffy and Plug are also present on the left and right sides of him, as he is standing in a Beano art gallery). | 9/6 (47.5p) |
| 1972 | Biffo is dressed as a lollipop man and holding a sign (which has the name of the book on it), while Dennis, Minnie, Roger, the Bash Street Kids, Three Bears, Billy Whizz, Lord Snooty, Bash Street Pups, The Nibblers (chased by Winston) and Little Plum all rush past him. Like the Dandy Annual of the year, it is the first to have a decimalized price instead of the old shillings & pence. | 50p |
| 1973 | Biffo is holding a glove puppet of Dennis with a club that has hit him over the head (its box says "GLOVE PUPPET, HARMLESS TOY" but it is clearly not). | 55p |
| 1974 | Biffo is tossing pancakes, while wearing a chef's hat. Two pancakes have landed on Dennis and Gnasher, and the Bash Street Kids are peering around the door (which suggests that he could have been working in Bash Street School, as the school's cook). This was the last annual to feature Biffo the Bear on the cover, he was replaced by Dennis on the cover starting from 1975. | 55p |
| 1975 | Dennis, Gnasher and the Bash Street Kids are playing in the snow, Dennis on a rocking horse instead of a sledge. | 60p |
| 1976 | Front: The Bash Street Kids are riding on Little Plum's horse, Treaclefoot, and wearing cowboy hats. On the back cover, the horse (Treaclefoot) runs away, which causes them to fall into a river, as they were only halfway across upon the book's front cover. | 70p |
| 1977 | Front: Dennis and Gnasher are jumping on a trampoline trying to get apples from a tree and the Bash Street Kids are watching from over the fence while Dennis's Dad watches them from behind the tree angrily. Back: Dennis's Dad tilts the trampoline and it bounces Dennis and Gnasher into the pond after they come down, covering them with water as the Bash Street Kids laugh at them. | 90p |
| 1978 | Front: The Bash Street Kids are bouncing across a farm on a spacehopper (or a "Super Bouncer", as the book refers to it) that has Dennis's face. Back: A cow's horns burst the spacehopper when it lands on them – which throws all of the kids off. | £1.00 |
| 1979 | Front: Dennis and Gnasher start rolling a gigantic snowball down a hill towards Lord Snooty, Biffo the Bear, Buster, Little Plum, Minnie, Wilfrid, Danny and Walter. Back: The snowball gets sliced in half by a big tree, that Dennis runs into. | £1.15 |
| 1980 | Front: Dennis is about to score a goal, for his football team. Gnasher is growling at the Bash Street Kids (who are all on top of the goalpost). Back: The Bash Street Kids' combined weight breaks the goalpost (and they all fall onto Dennis). | £1.25 |
| 1981 | Front: Dennis is jumping onto a seesaw which causes Gnasher to fly over a fence into the Beanotown Cats' Home. Back: One of the cats smacks him back over the fence with a fish, and he lands on Dennis, although he tries to get out of the way. | £1.40 |
| 1982 | Front: Dennis is playing on the dodgems at a fun fair, as all the other characters (Roger is wearing a blue-and-black checked jumper this time) are trying to get out of his way. Back: Dennis drives his dodgem out of the fair and into a pool. | £1.60 |
| 1983 | Front: Dennis, Lord Snooty, Biffo, Buster, Little Plum, Bash Street Pups, Grandpa, Billy Whizz, Ball Boy, and Tom, Dick and Sally are having their photo taken by the (then-current) Beano Editor in the Beano Office. Back: Everybody (except Dennis) clears the room in terror, when Gnasher jumps in through the office's window, and lands on the Editor's desk as he snaps the photo. | £1.80 |
| 1984 | Front: Dennis and Gnasher are chasing a pair of cats through the snow (and past a Dennis-like snowman). Back: One of the cats pushes the snowman's head onto Gnasher, as the other one laughs at him, and Dennis looks surprised at what has happened. | £2.00 |
| 1985 | Front: Dennis, Biffo the Bear, Walter and the Bash Street Kids are taking part in the "Beano Marathon". Back: Walter (who was being chased by Gnasher) surprisingly wins (even though he looked tired, when the race started on the front cover). | £2.25 |
| 1986 | Dennis rides his bike over a river into his Dad's prize apple tree, and all the other characters cheer him on. | £2.45 |
| 1987 | Front: Dennis, Gnasher, Minnie, Danny, Plug, Billy Whizz, and Ivy the Terrible are flying in a hot air balloon which has the name of the book on it. Back: Dennis uses the anchor to snatch up a stall that is selling slippers (for "whacking"). | £2.65 |
| 1988 | Front: Dennis and Minnie are having a paintball fight in the snow (there is also a "Dandy/Beano 50 Years Young" logo, seen in the bottom-right corner of this annual's cover). Back: Dennis and Minnie use their paint to write "Dennis and Minnie were here". | £2.85 |
| 1989 | Front: Dennis is painting a picture, of what appears to be Gnasher dressed as a Cavalier (he has actually titled it "The Gnashing Cavalier" as a result). Back: Gnasher jumps out of the picture, and bites off the paintbrush Dennis is holding. | £3.10 |
| 1990 | Front: All the characters are dancing in a disco room, with Dennis and Gnasher controlling the records (the latter is spinning on the turntable of the DJ deck). Back: Gnasher flies (still spinning as a result of the turntable), into the air. | £3.30 |
| 1991 | Front: All the characters are having a Christmas party with Dennis blowing a noisemaker in Gnasher's face. Back: The party goes awry when Gnasher steals Dennis's ice cream cone (and Dennis's Dad dispenses a big load of ice cream over Fatty). | £3.55 |
| 1992 | Front: All the characters are upon a merry-go-round sitting on replicas of their pets Back: All the characters' various pets are sitting on merry-go-round replicas of their owners. | £3.80 |
| 1993 | Front: All the characters are riding through the countryside in a series of connected wheeled trashcans being pulled by Gnasher. Back: Danny cuts the rope connecting Dennis's bin to the others, which causes him and Gnasher to crash-land in a ditch. The front endpaper of this annual, which shows a view of Beanotown, was also used on the title screen of (and the basis of the "Street Streak" track in) Beanotown Racing. | £4.10 |
| 1994 | Front: Dennis is walking through Beanotown, and switches on his torch to find many "Beano Bugs" flying around him. Back: Same as front. | £4.35 |
| 1995 | Front: All the then-current characters are racing on rafts, down a river. Back: Dennis and Gnasher's winning raft is revealed to have been pushed by a dolphin in a Menace jumper (who, after he became a regular feature, was named "Splasher"). | £4.50 |
| 1996 | Front: Dennis, Roger, Minnie and Danny are pushing down on Gnasher. Back: Gnasher launches up from a spring towards the Softies in their treehouse. | £4.75 |
| 1997 | Front: All the characters are inside a Chinese Dragon which has Dennis's face. Back: Gnasher sees its face and jumps (and there are also two other, smaller, Chinese Dragons, which have Minnie and Ivy the Terrible's faces, in the background). | £4.99 |
| 1998 | Front: Dennis the Menace is sticking many pictures of the other characters on a wall. Dennis's Dad is hanging upside down, and knocking on the window, as he just wants to be put the right way up again, and Ivy the Terrible has been pasted on the wall. Back: Same as front. | £5.25 |
| 1999 | Dennis and Gnasher are giving each other a "high-five", pictures of the other characters are displayed in some of the grid squares in the background. Front: Roger (top left), Minnie (top middle), Billy Whizz (top right), the Bash Street Kids (middle left), and Ivy the Terrible (bottom middle). Back: The Three Bears (top left), Joe King (top middle), Ball Boy (top right), Brainy Numbskull (bottom middle) | £5.45 |
| 2000 | Front: Dennis, Gnasher, and all the other characters (some retired) are flying through space, using special vehicles. Back: A continuation of the cavalcade of characters flying through space in a variety of altered vehicles. | £5.99 |
| 2001 | Front: Dennis and Gnasher are driving their Menace Car through a computer-generated world, trying to escape from an army of weird Beano robots (as there was a story about them travelling to a planet inhabited by them, and destroying them, in the annual). Back: Some of the army of Beano robots, including a Minnie-bot, Calamity James-bot, and Bash Street bots. | £6.20 |
| 2002 | Front: Many multi-coloured Pop-Art style pictures of the characters adorn the cover, with a gigantic hole in the centre where Dennis and Gnasher have driven through it with their Menace Car from the previous annual (Smiffy's head is also displayed upside-down). Back: Dennis and Gnasher flying away on their spacecraft, with the back views of all the heads from the front cover, in a reversed-order from left to right. | £6.25 |

=== The Beano Annual (2003–present) ===
| Year | Cover image | Price of Annual |
|---|---|---|
| 2003 | Front: All the characters are playing on a giant 3D mechanical Gnasher (a 2D one had previously been built by a school of aliens, in the 1997 annual). Back: The mechanical Gnasher goes after a mechanical cat, and all the characters fall off. | £6.45 |
| 2004 | Front: The first completely hand-drawn front cover picture since 1999, with a giant Loch Ness monster (whose face is very similar to Plug's) interfering with all the characters' relaxing swim up at "Loch Mess" (it is obviously a parody of Loch Ness). Back: Nessie is now joining in the fun, letting the Beano kids climb on him and use him as a waterslide. | £6.75 |
| 2005 | Front: Dennis and friends are bouncing on spacehoppers. Dennis has Rasher as a spacehopper. Back: Dennis bumps his head on a tree. | £6.99 |
| 2006 | Front: All the characters appear to be in a jungle. Back: We learn that the "jungle" is Dennis's back garden, where Dennis' dad is using Rasher as a lawnmower. | £6.99 |
| 2007 | Front: All the characters are crammed on to the front cover (one of whom is "Edd Case", the Numskulls' boy). Back: Dennis forces everybody else to run away by using his smelly socks as only he and his dogs can stand the smell. | £7.25 |
| 2008 | Front: Dennis is standing on top of a podium holding the "Menace of the Year" award, while Minnie has won second place and Danny has won third place. Everybody else is cheering for them (except for the Softies). Back: Dennis soaks the Softies with a bottle of pop and everybody else laughs. The endpapers also feature the cover of every previous Beano Annual published in the past. | £7.50 |
| 2009 | Front: Dennis's Dad is driving a float through Beanotown (which has a giant model of Dennis and Gnasher on the back) on the front cover. Back: Dennis, Gnasher, Minnie, and the other characters are throwing tomatoes at the float driven by Walter's dad (which also has a giant model of Walter on the back with flowers in his hands), and Walter's mum and the Softies are scared. | £7.99 |
| 2010 | Front: Dennis, Minnie, and Gnasher are practicing karate; Gnasher is wearing a karategi with a red belt. Back: Walter and the Softies (including Foo-Foo) are practicing "Soft Fu"; the Softies are wearing gi with pink belts. | £7.99 |
| 2011 | Front: Dennis and Gnasher are bouncing on a trampoline (similar to the 1977 annual, but they are nott trying to steal any apples here), while Minnie, Gnipper, Roger, Walter, Danny and Billy Whizz watch them from below. Back: Same as front. | £7.99 |
| 2012 | Front: Dennis is riding on a Gnasher-themed snowboard, while Gnasher himself is laughing in the foreground. This book also marked the 60th birthday of Dennis the Menace with a special logo that was displayed in the bottom-right corner of its front cover. Back: Same as front. | £7.99 |
| 2013 | Front: All the characters are at the Beano's 75th birthday street party (this was a reference to all the street parties that were held over the country in 2012 to celebrate The Queen's Diamond Jubilee). Back: The rest of the table is visible, along with all the other guests. | £7.99 |
| 2014 | Front: Roger, Minnie, Danny, Plug, Ball Boy, and Spotty are on the open top deck of a number 75 bus, along with Dennis and Gnasher who are holding a trophy cup saying "75 years of menacing". Back: A view of the whole bus with many more Beanotown residents on board. | £7.99 |
| 2015 | Front: Dennis the Menace and Gnasher at Beanotown train station, going to board a high-speed train. Back: Many other kids from Beanotown are also seen boarding the train, and Bananaman is flying overhead with a rope, intending to pull the train along the tracks. | £7.99 |
| 2016 | Front: Most of the characters are on a rollercoaster, Dennis being front and centre, with Minnie, Roger, Billy Whizz, Walter, and Gnasher; the Bash Street Kids are in another set of seats behind, and Bananaman is flying nearby. Back: A view of the whole of Beanotown Funfair. This was also the last Beano Annual to feature the 1977–2016 logo. | £7.99 |
| 2017 | Front: Dennis, Gnasher, Minnie and other characters are bursting through a yellow paper background. Back: The same characters are seen bursting through the yellow paper background from the back. This is also the first annual to feature the new logo. | £7.99 |
| 2018 | Front: Dennis is on a skateboard in space powered by new look Beano comics, while Gnasher is in a spacesuit. Back: Bananaman, Minnie, Roger, and Plug are flying around a giant stack of comics extending into space. Walter and his dad are in a "Comic Shredder" spaceship. | £7.99 |
| 2019 | Front: Dennis is on a "Rebels Wanted!" poster, and he has a Gnasher fan-club type badge on his chest, while other characters are cheering. Back: Minnie is flexing a bicep in a "We Can Do It!" poster, and more characters are cheering. Walter is attacked by a crocodile hatching out of an egg that was kicked at him by Big Eggo (on the front cover) | £7.99 |
| 2020 | Front: In a parody of "Honey I Shrunk The Kids", several miniature characters are jumping across from Gnasher's nose to Dennis'. Back: Under a magnifying glass, we see Minnie, Billy Whizz, Plug, Toots, Wilf, and Tricky Dicky smiling up. | £7.99 |
| 2021 | Front: Dennis and Gnasher are standing back-to-back, Gnasher on top of a pile of recent Beano annuals holding a bag of peas. A hand reaches for the bottom annual. Back: Smiffy removes the bottom annual from the stack, and Gnasher falls off, spilling peas that trip up Dennis, Minnie, Roger, and JJ. | £8.99 |
| 2022 | Front: Dennis, Gnasher, Minnie and JJ stand heroically on cliff. Back: Dan, Spotty, Rubi and Roger all having a tough time by wind from the cliff. | £8.99 |
| 2023 | Front: Dennis, Gnasher, and other characters are playing in their treehouse. Back: Other characters are in it too, and a notice reads: Operation: Save The Mayor. | £9.99 |
| 2024 | Front: Dennis, Minnie and other friends are celebrating Beano's 85th anniversary. Gnasher pops up. Back: The cake destroys everything and the characters are a mess. | 11.99 |
| 2025 | Front: Pictures of the characters are shown together. Back: Same as front, but there are different ones. | 11.99 |
| 2026 | Front: Dennis and Gnasher's faces are shown against a yellow background. Back: Dennis and Gnasher are on a rainbow parachute, which is held by other characters. | 11.99 |

Since the Beano's redesigned logo debuted on the 2017 annual (released 2016), the words "BEANO" and "ANNUAL (year)" have been displayed in a consistent size and font on the cover and spine each year; this had not previously been the case.

== See also ==
- List of Beano comic strips by annual
- List of DC Thomson publications
