= Commando (comics) =

British comic book magazine (1961 – present)

- Commando 4068 cover art by Ian Kennedy

Publication information
- Publisher: D. C. Thomson & Co. Ltd
- Schedule: Four issues every two weeks
- Format: Ongoing series
- Genre: War
- Publication date: July 1961 – present
- No. of issues: 5,826 (as of February 2025)

Collected editions
- The Dirty Dozen: ISBN 1-84442-307-7
- True Brit: ISBN 1-84442-121-X
- ANZACs At War: ISBN 1-84442-059-0
- All Guns Blazing: ISBN 1-84442-284-4
- Rumble in the Jungle: ISBN 1-84442-002-7
- Bandits at 12 O'Clock: ISBN 1-84732-128-3
- D-Day - Fight or Die!: ISBN 1-84732-372-3
- Battle of Britain - Scramble!: ISBN 1-84732-421-5
- Rogue Raiders: ISBN 1-84732-791-5
- Over the Top!: ISBN 1-85375-913-9

Commando For Action and Adventure, formerly known as Commando War Stories in Pictures, and colloquially known as Commando Comics, is a British comic book magazine that primarily draws its themes and backdrops from the various incidents of the First and Second World Wars. It was first published in July 1961 and is still in print today. It is noted for its distinctive 7 × 5½ inch, 68 page format that became a standard for these kinds of stories. Commando has remained more popular than many other British war comics, because of its character based stories and detailed black and white artwork, with only the covers in colour. It is considered by some to be one of the greatest war comics in history.

The stories contain certain characteristic motifs; to mention a few – courage, cowardice, patriotism, dying for the sake of one's country, noble actions, and making a cup of refreshing tea while in the face of danger, enmity turning into friendship when the going gets tough, and so on. Apart from portraying these universal qualities, Commando Comics also show soldiers in national stereotypes, glorifying Allied soldiers, but showing soldiers as a mixture of good and evil. Typically, each story was self-contained within a single issue, though, in later years, several stories have seen recurring characters appear.

== Publication history ==
The comic series, then going by the title Commando War Stories in Pictures, was launched by D.C. Thomson of Dundee, Scotland, in July 1961. It was an addition to the company's already high-profile comics, such as The Beano and The Dandy, as well as The Victor launched earlier that same year. During its launch year two issues were published per month, but due to the comic's increasing popularity this rose to four a month. Since 1971 there have been eight issues published per month. As of issue 539, certain stories have been reprinted. In September 1993 the comic title changed to Commando For Action and Adventure. The last issue to feature the former title was issue 2690, Password to Freedom, published in August. The first comic to feature the new title was issue 2691, A Race Against Time, published the following month.

As well as the comics, annuals were also produced in 1989 and 1990, each containing seven new stories. The annuals were in full colour and illustrated in the style of the time, not in the original style of the comics.

At its peak in terms of sales, in one month during the 1970s, Commando's comics circulation figures reached 750,000 according to George Low, who began working with Commando in 1963 and retired as editor in 2007. Current circulation is 9,600 copies a fortnight per issue.

Issue no 4000 of Commando – 'Aces All!' – was released in April 2007. In 2011, Commando Comics celebrated their 50th anniversary of publication, having begun in 1961. They issued reprints of several of the early Commando stories from the 1960s. Commando in 2011 re-printed (in reverse order) all of the first twelve issues from 1961. Since 2007, half of Commando issues released have been re-prints of earlier stories but the remainder are new and original stories and artwork. A book celebrating the best of Commando comics cover art was released in October 2011. In 2011, new editions of Commando became available via digital download.

In June 2013, it was announced that Commando Comics, whilst still owned by D C Thomson based in Dundee, would now be printed by GGP Media in Germany.

Commando released their 5,000th issue, 'Zero Hour,' in March 2017.

== Artists and writers ==
Commando in its long history has employed 140 writers, over 100 cover artists & 120 interior artists. The artists & writers have been based in a variety of locations including the UK, Italy and Argentina. Some writers and artists who have worked on Commando include:-

- David Motton wrote the first issue Walk or Die. He wrote three of the first five issues and then over a score more. He also wrote Dan Dare for Eagle.
- Gordon Livingstone who was one of the first artists employed by Commando when it began in 1961. His first issue was Commando No 4-Mercy for None first printed in July 1961. Livingstone produced the interior story art for over 360 issues of Commando and the cover art for over 30 issues. His last work was issue no 3293-Sweeney's Island, released in December 1999, the same year he retired. He died in 2017.
- Ken Barr who has produced the cover art for over 200 issues, including the earliest ones printed in 1961.
- John Ridgway, whose work with Commando began in 1971 with issue no 546 Mustang Ace and who has drawn the interior art for over 120 issues and for half of those, he also did the cover-art.
- Denis McLoughlin came to Commando relatively late in his career. Having worked as an illustrator since the 1940s, he drew the interior art for his first Commando (no 1623 Fight Back) in 1982. McLoughlin drew the interior art for over 170 issues prior to his death in 2002 at the age of 84.
- Ian Kennedy who, from 1970 produced the cover-art for over 1200 issues of Commando and also drew the interior story art for five issues (he also worked for Battle, Air Ace & War Picture Libraries). Ian, who had over 70 years experience working in comics died in 2022.
- Jose Maria Jorge was an Argentinian artist who had a distinctive and precise drawing style and who produced the interior art for 163 issues, nearly all of which were aviation and naval-themed stories. His work with Commando began in 1969 with issue no 384-Flying Fury and he had the honour of illustrating Commando No 4000 in 2007. His final issue was No 4329-Divided Aces printed shortly before his death at the age of 69 in 2010.
- Keith Page began in 1996 with issue 2941 Odd Man Out and has since drawn the interior art for over 200 issues.
- Shane Filer, a novelist whose first book Exit was published by Biblio Publishing is a more recent contributor. He has written 7 issues, including No 5133-The Home Front which featured a rare female protagonist, and was illustrated by Carlos Pino.
- Alan Hebden wrote 286 stories for Commando, 30 of which featured the Convict Commandos.
- Carlos Pino Gallardo (credited as Carlos Pino) began drawing for Commando in 1989 with issue #2302.
- Ferg Handley has written over 250 issues of Commando, most notably the series featuring the Special Raiding Force known as Ramsey’s Raiders.
- Brent Towns, a novelist from Australia, has written over 20 issues of Commando, many of which have featured Australian or New Zealand forces.
- Andrew Knighton, an author of speculative and historical fiction, began writing for Commando in 2018 and has created several stories set in historical eras such as the Napoleonic Wars and medieval period.
- Colin Maxwell, a writer and artist of comics featuring historical characters and events, began writing for Commando in 2020 with issue #5371.
- Neil Roberts, an artist with over 20 years experience in art, illustration and game art, has illustrated the covers of over 60 issues of Commando.
- Manuel Benet Blanes (credited as Manuel Benet), an artist from Spain, is one of the most prolific of current artists on Commando, having illustrated the covers and interiors of hundreds of issues.
- Calum Laird took over as editor of Commando in 1981, and although now retired, he still contributes stories.
- Graham Manley, an artist who had previously worked on The Dandy and 2000AD, began providing artwork in 2022 with his first cover on issue #5585 and interior work in issue #5589.
- Comic artist and book illustrator Keith Burns produced the cover art for his first Commando #5209 American Avenger in March 2019. To date, he has produced the cover art for over 40 issues of Commando.
- Scribe Award nominee Julian Michael Carver, who has written for BattleTech and, to date, the only novel written for the TV show Primeval: New World, debuted in 2025 with issue 5877 Feeding Frenzy. The story is based on the incident involving the USS Indianapolis.

== Themes and stories ==
In the early years, all of Commando stories were set during the Second World War but in more recent decades, the comic has extended its range to a variety of conflicts including the First World War, the Cold War, Spanish Civil War, the Falklands, Korea, Vietnam, the Napoleonic Wars and conflicts in the medieval & ancient eras. A handful of issues have also dealt with fictional conflicts such as civil wars fought between imaginary states.

Commando has also featured stories that have crossed into other genres such as horror, supernatural and science-fiction. There were early examples that, although set in the Second World War, incorporated these alternate genres in their stories such as #808 Haunted Skies (1974), #1180 Island of Horror (1977) and #1495 Out of the Future (1981). By the 1990s, Commando was featuring such genres in settings other than WW2. One example was issue #2774 Space Watch (1994), a science-fiction adventure about spaceship battles.

Since the mid-1970s, Commando has been also willing to portray conflicts through the viewpoint of soldiers on the opposite side. Issues such as #1350 Private Schultz's War (1979), #2598 Let Me Fly (1992), #2713 The Flying Musketeers (1993) and #2841 Hero of the Reich (1995) portrayed World War II from the experiences of German combatants. The issue #2574-Giant Duel (1992) was a story told from the perspective of Italian combatants in WW2. Issues #922 A Question of Honour (1975) and #1168 Thunderbolt (1977) featured respectful portrayals of Japanese combatants.

The majority of Commando issues have featured self-contained single stories but a small number have featured recurring characters in a series of multiple issues. One early example were characters Tom, Dick & Harry which featured in two issues released in the early 1960s. Beginning in 1991, a 5-issue series The Bomb Gang was released, featuring a group of misfits during WW2 tasked with bomb-disposal duties. Other series have included Ramsey's Raiders, a series inspired by the exploits of the SAS in North Africa during WW2 and Log of the Lairds, a generational series about an English family-line of special agents operating in the Middle East from the Great War to Operation Desert Storm. Another series was Eagles of Battle, another generational series portraying the interlocked stories of several families in south-west Britain, spanning from the Roman era through to the Second World War.

Commando Comic No. 1390 - The Tank-Men (published in 1980) - featured a fictionalised character Sergeant Frederick Manning (a.k.a. Fred Manning). The plot synopsis on the back of the comic reads: "Sergeant Fred Manning was no stranger to action, and when he was posted to command a Sherman tank in the Allied advance through Germany, he thought that his previous experience would stand him in good stead. But all his fighting had taken place in the battles which had raged across the deserts of North Africa. And now he would soon learn that this was to be a very different kind of war...". On 7 September 2026 The Tank-Men was re-published as Issue Number 5994: story by RA Montague, internal art by Gordon C. Livingstone, and cover art by Marco Bianchini. It is unclear to what extent the fictionalised Sergeant Fred Manning is based on the real-life Second World War British Army Commando Corporal of the same name.

Despite the emphasis placed on action and adventure, the creators of Commando have placed great importance on achieving historical and technical accuracy as much as possible. The first editor of Commando, Charles Checkley, and his deputy Ian Forbes (who later became the second editor) both served in the Second World War. George Low remarked that Forbes always had a great respect for the Germans and that it was important that distinctions be made between fanatical Nazis and the ordinary German soldiers.

In 2019, Commando began publishing stories with a supernatural or horror theme around Halloween each year. The stories maintain a war theme, but have featured zombies, vampires, werewolves and ghost stories.

== Cross-over characters ==
Recently, Commando has released issues featuring characters that are 'cross-overs' from other publications. In 2019, Commando released their first issue featuring Matt Braddock aka Braddock of the Bombers, a British pilot of RAF Bomber Command who appeared in earlier DC Thomson comics, beginning in the 1950s in Rover and in later decades in Warlord and Victor comics.

In 2023, Commando began releasing issues starring the character Gerald Cadman, a vain, caddish and cowardly British officer who originally featured in Victor comics in the 1970s.

== Appearance and format ==
The Commando comic differs from the more widely known American comic book in that it is published in a 7 × 5½ inch, 68 page format, with some 135 panels per story, which is roughly similar to a standard 22 page US comic. Most panels have both captions and dialogue to further the plot. Sound effects are rarely if ever used. The intention is to make a Commando story easy to read and follow.

The artwork is in black and white except for the covers, with the lettering done in typewriter font. Until recently writers and artists went uncredited as usual for D.C Thomson comics, though now a small grenade icon appears on the first panel, crediting individuals with story, art and cover.

== Collected editions ==
In 2005, Carlton Books Ltd released an anthology of twelve Commando stories selected by George Low, who has edited the series since 1963. This proved a commercial success and further anthology collections have been published, some of which are themed. To date, these collections are:

- The Dirty Dozen (784 pages, November 2005, ISBN 1-84442-307-7)

Containing 12 issues: Inland Navy, Rileys Rifle, Aces Wild, Trouble Spot, Mustang Patrol, Death Patrol, The Ship Busters, Battle Wagon, Three...Two...One...Zero!, March of the Monsters, Man of Iron, Glider Ace. (This book was also published in two other editions, one called 'The 12 Best Commando Stories ever' (with different cover art also) and the other entitled 'Call of Battle', published by Seven-Oaks in 2009 which had identical cover-art to 'Dirty Dozen' but contained 10 of the above 12 stories).

- True Brit (784 pages, October 2006, ISBN 1-84442-121-X)

Containing 12 issues: Guns on the Peak, The Fighting Few, Bright Blade of Courage, The Haunted Jungle, Tiger in the Tail, The Specialists, VLR-Very Long Range, The Mighty Midget, Flak Fever, Fight or Die!, Fearless Freddy, Another Tight Spot. (This book has been also published in two other editions – one in 2009 with the same cover-art and similar title –True Grit – but with 10 of the above 12 stories, and the other in 2007 with all 12 stories but with different cover-art and title The 12 Toughest Commando Stories Ever).

- ANZACs At War (783 pages, August 2007, ISBN 1-84442-059-0) This anthology contains a rare issue set in the Vietnam War. This was also published in another edition by Seven-Oaks which featured the same 12 stories but with different cover-art and a different title:-Commando: The Best 12 Aussie and Kiwi War Stories Ever. This title was also later re-released as ANZAC Heroes (January 2009, ISBN 1-74237-152-3) featuring the original cover art but with only 10 of the 12 stories.

Containing 12 issues: Maori Challenge, The Forgotten Five, War in the Wet, Test By Battle, Regan's Raiders, Killing Zone, Outback Army, Sub-Chaser, Secret in the Sand, Island of Fear, Outlaw from the Outback, The Warlord

- All Guns Blazing (784 pages, September 2007, ISBN 1-84442-284-4)

Containing 12 issues: Fire Over England, Desert Fox, Danger in the Deep, The Desert of Death, The Savage Sky, The Death or Glory Mob, Zero Smasher, Island of Death, Sea Strike, Assassin!, They Flew by Night, Colonel Scarface.

- Rumble in the Jungle (784 pages, May 2008, ISBN 1-84442-002-7)

Containing 12 issues: Tinker Tailor Soldier Sailor, Jungle Madness, Mighty Maguire, Leave Him Behind!, Jungle Patrol, Grudge Fight, Into the Jungle, Jungle Sniper, The Black Pagoda, Jungle Express, Halt-Or Die!, Danger Everywhere!

- Bandits at 12 O'Clock (784 pages, September 2008, ISBN 1-84732-128-3)

Containing 12 issues: Battle Squadron, Son of a Traitor, Death of a Wimpey, The Silver Spitfire, Sailor with Wings, Lone Eagle, Sea Blitz, A Stirling called Satan, Low-Level Lanc, Black Zero, Mosquito Ace, Jet Blitz.

- D-Day - Fight or Die! (May 2009, ISBN 1-84732-372-3)

Containing 12 issues: Ambush at Dawn, The Strongpoint, Normandy Drop, Wrong Time-Wrong Place, Big Joe, Blood of Heroes, D-Day Drop, Operation Bulldog, Wolf Pack, Man of Iron, Big Guy, The Footsloggers

- Battle of Britain - Scramble! (656 Pages, October 2009, ISBN 1-84732-421-5)

Containing 10 issues: The Flying Avengers, Upside-Down Ace, Battle of the Boffins, Winged Wolves, Danger Below, Czech Mate, Squadron Scramble, No Mercy, Spitfire Spirit, Death of a Cobra.

- Rogue Raiders (656 Pages, May 2011, ISBN 1-84732-791-5)

Containing 10 issues: Operation Firebrand!, Half-Pint Commando, Terror Team, The Iron Sergeant, Time of Terror, The Mad Major, Spring the Trap, A Born Leader, Marked Man, Ten Tough Paratroopers.

- Over the Top! (656 Pages, November 2014, ISBN 1-85375-913-9)

Containing 10 issues: The Family Honour, Tin Can Warriors, Submarine Warriors, Killers in No-Man's Land, Mooney's Monster, Mongrel Squadron, Roar of the Guns, Duel over the Desert, Battling Bessie, Sentenced to Death!

Two box sets have also been published:

- Commando: Ammo Box (2420 pages, October 2008, ISBN 1-84732-087-2)

Containing The Dirty Dozen, True Brit, All Guns Blazing and the very first issue of Commando – Walk or Die!

- Commando: High Explosive (2420 pages, October 2010, ISBN 1-84732-703-6 )

Containing Bandits at 12 O'Clock, Rumble in the Jungle, D-Day: Fight or Die! and the second issue of Commando – 'They Called Him Coward!'

In July 2011, Carlton Books Ltd began releasing smaller, 'pocket-sized' collections of Commando Comics edited by Calum Laird, each edition featuring three stories published in the original size, a similar format to the original 'Holiday Specials' released by Battle & Air Ace Picture Libraries.

- Tally Ho! (July 2011, ISBN 1-84732-820-2)

Containing 3 issues: Whirlwind!, O for Orange, Hurri to the Rescue.

- Banzai! (July 2011, ISBN 1-84732-819-9)

Containing 3 issues: Fight to the Finish, Where the Action is!, The Curse of Nanga-Jevi.

- Action Stations! (July 2011, ISBN 1-84732-822-9)

Containing 3 issues: Buccaneer Bob RN, Identity Unknown, Rogue Sub.

- Achtung! (July 2011, ISBN 1-84732-821-0)

Containing 3 issues: Danger Mountain, Destroy by Fire!, Spearhead.

- Bombs Away! (April 2012, ISBN 1-84732-971-3)

Containing 3 issues: Ghost Pilot, Hoodoo Ace, Deck-Level Dawson

- Dive! Dive! Dive! (April 2012, ISBN 1-84732-969-1)

Containing 3 issues: Java Sea Jinx, Dive! Dive! Dive!, "The Silent Service.

- Who Dares Wins (April 2012, ISBN 1-84732-970-5)

Containing 3 issues: Sabotage, The Secret Heroes, Ramsey's Raiders.

- Desert Rats (April 2012, ISBN 1-84732-968-3)

Containing 3 issues: Fighting Fool!, Oasis of Death, Chariot of War.

- Tank Attack (Sept 2013, ISBN 1-85375-893-0)

Containing 3 issues: Trail of the Tiger, Bring on the Tanks, A Tank called Tessie.

- Airborne Assault (Sept 2013, ISBN 1-85375-892-2)

Containing 3 issues: Glider Strike, Ten Tough Paratroopers, Strike at Sundown.

- Behind Enemy Lines (Sept 2013, ISBN 1-85375-891-4)

Containing 3 issues: Into Bandit Country, One Man's War, Spy Trap.

- Who Dares Wins (Nov 2013, ISBN 1-84732-970-5)

Containing 3 issues: The Secret Heroes, Sabotage!, Raiders on the Rampage.

- Weapons of Vengeance (Nov 2013, ISBN 1-85375-894-9)

Containing 3 issues: Operation Valhalla, Rocket Strike, Project Doomsday.

In August 2013, Prion (Carlton) Books released collections of Commandoes that each featured six stories, published in the original size. Please note, these editions feature stories already included in the earlier anthologies.

- Marching to Glory (Aug 2013, ISBN 1-85375-896-5)

Containing 6 issues: Rileys Rifle, Death Patrol, Guns on the Peaks, Battle Wagon, Man of Iron, The Haunted Jungle.

- Rampaging Raiders (Aug 2013, ISBN 1-85375-898-1)

Containing 6 issues: Trouble Spot, Three-Two-One-Zero!, The Specialists, VLR-Very Long Range, Fight or Die!, Fearless Freddy.

- Heroes Fly High (Aug 2013, ISBN 1-85375-899-X)

Containing 6 issues: Aces Wild, Mustang Patrol, Glider Ace, The Fighting Few, Tiger in the Tail, Flak Fever.

- Deadly Seas (Aug 2013, ISBN 1-85375-897-3)

Containing 6 issues: Inland Navy, The Ship-Busters, March of the Monsters, Bright Blade of Courage, Mighty Midget, Another Tight Spot.

In October 2022, two digital collections were published by D.C. Thomson and made available on Amazon and ComiXology. The collections included stories featuring the Codename: Warlord character and several horror/supernatural stories. D.C. Thomson have said they plan to publish more of these collections featuring stories from their back catalogue under their Heritage Comics brand.

== In other languages ==
The comics were popular in Finland, where they were known by the name "Korkeajännitys", meaning "high excitement" - it's a wordplay, referring to "korkeajännite", which would mean "high voltage". Hence the tagline: "Iskee kuin miljoona volttia", meaning "Strikes like a million volts". The term "korkeajännitys" doesn't exist in Finnish language outside this wordplay. Special issues of Korkeajännitys based on Finnish themes have been published by Egmont Publishing since 1998. These themes include Finnish Civil War, Finnish War as well as Winter War and Continuation War.

These comics have also been published in India in Hindi, under the title Commando - Sachitra Yudh Kathayein by Gowarsons Publishers Pvt. Ltd.

== Legacy ==
In 2011–2012 the National Army Museum in London staged a major retrospective exhibition, "Draw Your Weapons: The Art of Commando Comics". Between 1 October 2023 and 30 April 2024, an exhibition was held at the Soldiers of Oxfordshire Museum, entitled "Into Battle! The Art of British War Comics", sponsored by the built environment consultancy Ridge.

Mathias Nelson from Forgotten Wars considered the comic series to be the longest-running and the best of its genre, stating, "Commando Comics is one of the greatest war comics ever written, and I myself knew people who were inspired by it to actually enlist in the British military."

== See also ==
- List of magazines published in Scotland
- List of DC Thomson publications
- Starblazer, a sister publication, with a science fiction theme
- Ricardo Garijo, long-time illustrator for Commando
- Action
- Adventures in the Rifle Brigade, by Garth Ennis
- Battlefields by Ennis
- Battle Picture Weekly
- Charley's War, by Pat Mills
- Warlord
- War Picture Library
- The Victor
