= List of magazines in Scotland =

List of magazines published in Scotland is an incomplete list of magazines and comics published in Scotland.

There are over 700 magazines currently being published in Scotland, by nearly 200 organisations, with an estimated total turnover of £157m per annum.

The Scots Magazine, first published in January 1739, is the oldest magazine in the world still in publication, although there have been several gaps in its publication history. The Dandy, first published on 3 December 1937, is currently the longest running comic in the world. Both of these titles are owned by DC Thomson of Dundee, a major publisher of newspapers and periodicals.

== Contemporary ==
=== Magazines ===
==== Gaelic language ====
- An Gaidheal Ur (The New Gael)
- Dàna

==== Scots language ====
- Lallans, bi-annual journal from the Scots Language Society

==== Lifestyle and general interest ====
- Scottish Field
- The Big Issue in Scotland
- bunkered
- Five Star Magazine
- My Weekly
- The People's Friend
- Scotsgay
- Shout
- The Weekly News

==== Literature, arts and entertainment ====
- Chapman, literary
- Clash, youth
- The Drouth, the arts
- Edinburgh Review
- Lines Review 1952–1998, poetry magazine published by Callum Macdonald (1912–1999)
- The List, entertainment in Edinburgh and Glasgow
- M8, entertainment in Edinburgh and Glasgow
- Prospect, architecture
- Scotcampus, entertainment and culture for students
- The Skinny, music, film, culture and arts in Dundee, Edinburgh and Glasgow
- Variant, nominally arts and culture; emphasis on society and politics

==== Politics ====
- Cencrastus
- Common Sense
- Emancipation and Liberation
- Frontline
- Harpies and Quines
- Holyrood
- Scottish Left Review
- Tait's Edinburgh Magazine

==== Religion ====
- Life and Work, Church of Scotland

==== Scottish interest ====
- The Scots Magazine

=== Comics and children's magazines ===
==== DC Thomson ====
- The Beano
- Commando
- The Dandy
- Oor Wullie

==== Other ====
- Metaphrog
- Glamville Magazine

== Defunct ==
=== Magazines ===
- Gath
- Harpies and Quines

=== Comics and children's magazines ===
==== DC Thomson ====
- The Beezer (1956–1993)
- Bullet (1976–1978)
- Buzz (1973–1975)
- Cracker (1975–1976)
- Hoot (1985–1986)
- Jackie (1964–1993)
- Nutty (1980–1985)
- Plug (1977–1979)
- Sparky (1965–1977)
- Starblazer
- The Topper (1953–1990)
- The Victor
- Warlord

==== Other ====
- Electric Soup (1989–?)
- Louis by metaphrog (2000–present)
- Northern Lightz (1999–2004)

== No longer published in Scotland ==
The following magazines were once published in Scotland, but are now published elsewhere:

- The Celtic View, still written and produced in Glasgow, but now (since 2005) published by CRE8 of Oxfordshire, England

== See also ==
- Carn, published in the Isle of Man, but sold in Scotland and the other Celtic countries
- List of DC Thomson publications
- List of Scottish Gaelic periodicals
- Media in Scotland
