= The Hotspur =

British boys' paper

Hotspur
- Issue 1 of Hotspur (1933)

Publication information
- Publisher: D. C. Thomson & Co.
- Publication date: (story paper) 2 September 1933 – 17 October 1959 (comic book) October 1959 – January 1981
- No. of issues: 1,197 (vol. 1); 1,110 (vol. 2)

The Hotspur was a British boys' paper published by D. C. Thomson & Co. From 1933 to 1959, it was a boys' story paper; it was relaunched as a comic in October 1959, initially called The New Hotspur, and ceased publication in January 1981.

== Story paper ==
The Hotspur was launched on 2 September 1933 as a story paper, the last of the 'Big Five'. The first issue came with a black mask as a free gift and contained an offer for an electric shock machine:

It's a great prize, absolutely harmless and will give hours of fun. Just watch your pal's face when you give him his first electric shock!

Thomson's 'Big Five' papers were extremely successful; the name was used by both readers and the industry. (Note: In addition to The Hotspur they were Adventure, The Rover, The Wizard and The Skipper.) In 1939 the company advertised combined weekly sales of over a million for the group; the first issue of The Hotspur sold over 350,000 copies. The Hotspur specialised in school stories; its Red Circle School stories replaced the public school stories in rival publisher Amalgamated Press' The Gem and The Magnet as reader favourites.

Like other British children's publications, The Hotspur was published weekly, except for the Second World War and its aftermath, when as a result of paper rationing it published fortnightly, alternating with The Wizard. The original Hotspur story paper published 1,197 issues, the last on 17 October 1959.

=== Notable characters and series ===
- Red Circle School – a public school with pupils from all over the world
- Bill Sampson – also known as The Wolf of Kabul, an agent of the British Intelligence Corps, first introduced in The Wizard, appeared in illustrated format in The Hotspur.

== Comic book ==
It relaunched in comic format as The New Hotspur on 24 October 1959, a week after the original series ceased publication, and ran for another 1,110 issues until being incorporated into The Victor on 24 January 1981. The new format contained comic strips as opposed to the old text story format. The word "new" in the title was dropped with issue #174. There were several mergers during the 1970s: with The Hornet in 1976, and with The Crunch in 1980.

=== Strips ===
- The Black Sapper (1971–1973, from Rover and then The Beezer) – a genius inventor who creates "The Earthworm," a giant drilling machine used to rob banks. Eventually, the character changed to become a good guy. Drawn by Terry Patrick.
- Coral Island
- Dozy Danny – eleven-year-old Danny Lorimer is constantly nodding off during the school day, as his stepfather forces him to get up at four o'clock in the morning every day to make coal briquettes.
- Jonny Jett
- King Cobra – journalist Bill King transforms into the UK's very own high-tech superhero. Drawn by Ron Smith.
- Spring Heeled Jackson (1977–1981) – John Jackson is a bumbling police clerk who fights crime with the aid of a fantastic costume. (Note: The name is likely a reference to the English folklore character Spring-heeled Jack.)
- Union Jack Jackson (from 1962) – a British Royal Marine serving with the US Marine Corps in the Pacific campaign during World War II, later in Warlord.
- Wilson of the Track
- X-Bow

== In popular culture ==
The magazine is mentioned in the BBC sitcom Dad's Army in the 1975 Christmas special episode series 8 episode 7 "My Brother and I"; a copy of The Hotspur owned by Private Pike is being read by Sergeant Wilson. It is mentioned in episode 3 of The Singing Detective TV series when young Philip's mother says to him "You should have brought your Hotspur".

In the ITV Poirot series, a dentist, Mr Morley, has a member of staff who is reading the comic at his desk in Series 4 Episode 3: ‘One, Two, Buckle My Shoe’.
