= Carlos Ezquerra =

Spanish comics artist (1947–2018)

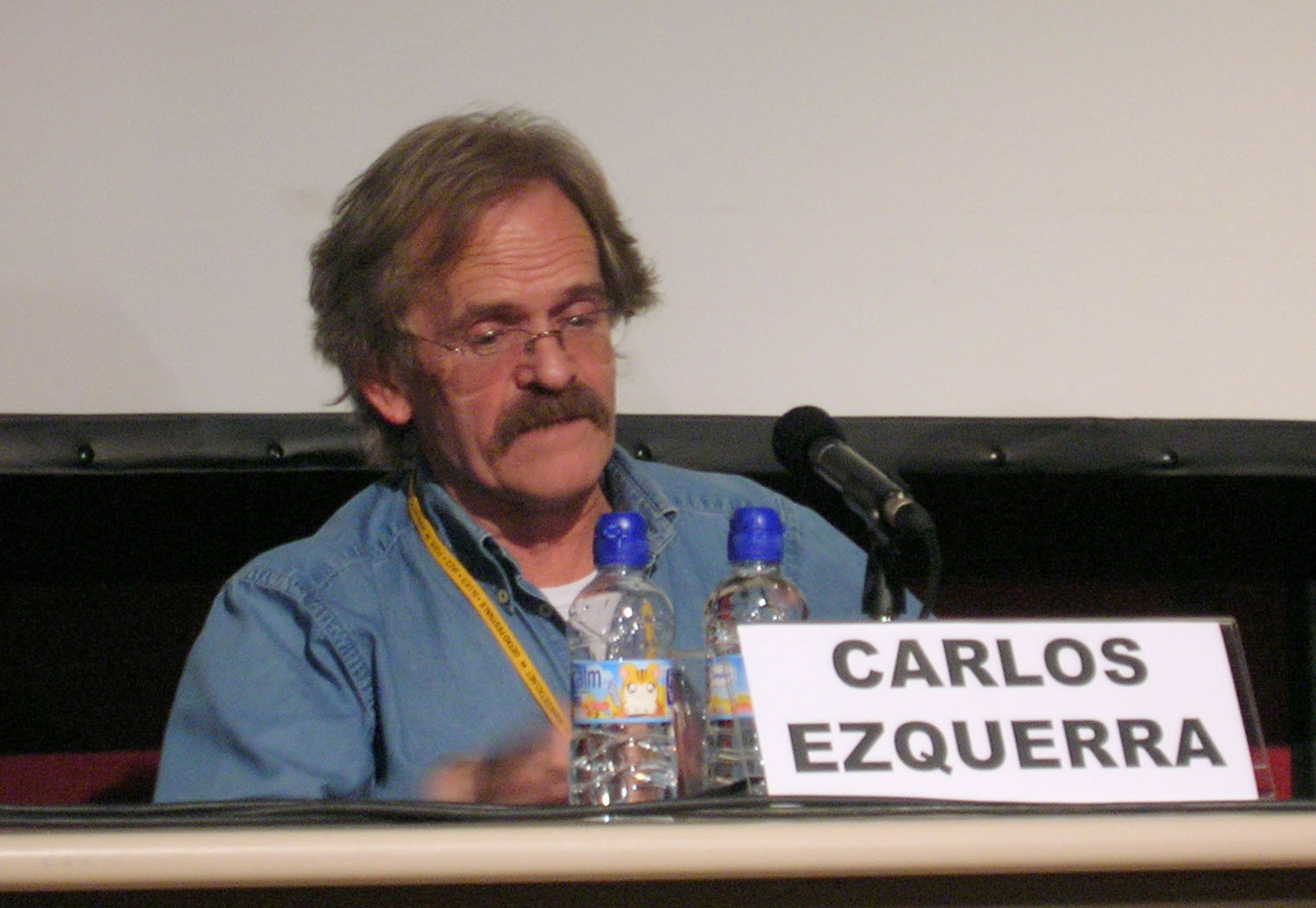
- Ezquerra in 2005
- Born: Carlos Sanchez Ezquerra; 12 November 1947 Ibdes, Province of Zaragoza, Spain
- Died: 1 October 2018 (aged 70)
- Pseudonym: L. John Silver
- Notable works: Judge Dredd; Strontium Dog; Just a Pilgrim; The Stainless Steel Rat
- Awards: Inkpot Award; National Comics Awards
- Children: 2

Carlos Sanchez Ezquerra (/əsˈkɛərə/; 12 November 1947 – 1 October 2018) was a Spanish comics artist who worked mainly in British comics. He is best known as the co-creator of Judge Dredd.

== Biography ==
=== Early work ===
Born in Ibdes, province of Zaragoza, Aragon, Ezquerra started his career drawing westerns and war stories for Spanish publishers. In 1973, he got work in the UK market through agent Barry Coker, drawing for girls' romance titles such as Valentine and Mirabelle, as well as westerns for Thorpe & Porter's Pocket Western Library, and a variety of adventure strips for D. C. Thomson & Co.'s The Wizard. Despite the UK being a convenient market for artists living in Spain as the exchange rate meant the work paid well, Ezquerra decided to move to London to be near the work, settling in Croydon with his wife.

=== Battle and 2000 AD ===
In 1974, on the strength of his uncredited work for The Wizard, Pat Mills and John Wagner headhunted him, through Coker, to work for the new IPC title Battle Picture Weekly. He drew "Rat Pack": inspired by the film The Dirty Dozen, the strip, written by Gerry Finley-Day, featured a gang of criminals recruited to carry out suicide missions. But his commitments elsewhere meant he could not draw it full-time, and other artists were also used. In 1976 Battle editor Dave Hunt convinced him to commit himself to the title, offering him the laid-back anti-hero "Major Eazy", written by Alan Hebden. Ezquerra drew nearly 100 episodes in the next two and a half years, basing the character's appearance on the actor James Coburn.

Judge Dredd in the first panel of Ezquerra's first published Judge Dredd story, "Krong", in 2000 AD #5, March 1977.

He was asked to visualise a new character, future lawman Judge Dredd, for the science fiction weekly 2000 AD, prior to its launch in 1977. His elaborate designs displeased the strip's writer, John Wagner, but impressed editor Pat Mills, and his cityscapes persuaded Mills to set the strip further into the future than initially intended. But Wagner (temporarily) quit over ownership issues, and Ezquerra followed him when the first published appearance of the character was drawn by another artist, Mike McMahon. He returned to Battle, where he once again teamed up with Alan Hebden to create "El Mestizo", a black gun-for-hire who played both sides against the middle during the American Civil War.

Final image of Judge Dredd in Ezquerra's last published Judge Dredd story, "Get Jerry Sing", 40 years later in 2000 AD #2023, March 2017.

In 1978 he and Wagner created "Strontium Dog", a science fictional western about a bounty hunter in a future where mutants are an oppressed minority forced into doing such dirty work, for Starlord, a short-lived sister title to 2000 AD with higher production values. Starlord was later merged into 2000 AD, bringing "Strontium Dog" with it. Ezquerra was almost the only artist to draw the character, until 1988, when writer Alan Grant decided to kill him off in a storyline called "The Final Solution". Ezquerra disagreed with the decision, and refused to draw the story, which was instead illustrated by Simon Harrison and Colin MacNeil. In 2000 Wagner and Ezquerra revived "Strontium Dog" based on a treatment Wagner had written for an abortive TV pilot. Initially, stories were set before the character's death in a revised continuity, but 2010's "The Life and Death of Johnny Alpha" brought Johnny back from the dead.

Other 2000 AD strips he drew included Fiends of the Eastern Front (1980), a vampire story set in World War II, written by Gerry Finley-Day, and adaptations of Harry Harrison's Stainless Steel Rat novels, with the title character once again resembling James Coburn. In 1982 he returned to "Judge Dredd" to draw "The Apocalypse War", a seven-month epic which he drew in its entirety. He continued to draw the character semi-regularly, handling the whole of "Necropolis" in 1990, "Origins" in 2006–07, and many others.

His son Hector inked and coloured in his pencil work for Strontium Dog between 2008 and 2012.

The character of Stogie from the long-running 2000 AD strip Robo-Hunter was given the full name Carlos Sanchez Robo-Stogie in tribute to Ezquerra.

=== Other work ===
Ezquerra collaborated numerous times with writer Garth Ennis on Bloody Mary, Adventures in the Rifle Brigade, War Stories, The Boys: The Self-Preservation Society, a Hitman annual, two Preacher specials (The Good Old Boys and The Saint of Killers miniseries) for DC Comics, and Just a Pilgrim for Black Bull Entertainment.

Ezquerra occasionally used the pen name "L. John Silver" for work such as 2000 AD's "The Riddle of the Astral Assassin!" prog 118, and ABC Warriors, progs 134–136.

=== Awards ===
- National Comics Awards for Best Artist in Comics Today, 2001
- Inkpot Award, 2015

=== Death ===
In later life Ezquerra moved to Andorra. He died of lung cancer on 1 October 2018, at the age of 70. He never retired, and his uncompleted final work, "Spector," was published posthumously in June 2019 by 2000 AD. (Note: The story was later completed by another artist and published in 2023–24.)

In May 2023 the government of Zaragoza voted to name a street after him.

== Bibliography ==
=== Comics ===
Comics work includes:

- Rat Pack (with Gerry Finley-Day, in Battle Picture Weekly, 1975, collected in Volume 1, 128 pages, Titan Books, September 2010, ISBN 1-84856-035-4)
- Major Eazy (with Alan Hebden, in Battle Picture Weekly, 1976–1978, collected in Volume 1, 120 pages, Titan Books, November 2010, ISBN 1-84856-441-4)
- El Mestizo (with Alan Hebden, in Battle Picture Weekly, 1977)
- Judge Dredd (1977–2017):
  - "Krong" (with Malcolm Shaw, in 2000 AD #5, 1977)
  - "Robot Wars" (with John Wagner, in 2000 AD #10, 1977)
  - "Bank Raid" (with Pat Mills and John Wagner, in Judge Dredd Annual 1981), 1980
  - "The Apocalypse War" (with John Wagner and Alan Grant, in 2000 AD #245–270, 1982)
  - "Meka City" (with John Wagner and Alan Grant, in 2000 AD #271–272, 1982)
  - "Fungus" (with John Wagner and Alan Grant, in 2000 AD #275–277, 1982)
  - "The Big Itch" (with John Wagner, in Judge Dredd Annual 1983, 1982)
  - "Behold the Beast" (with John Wagner, in Judge Dredd Annual 1983, 1982)
  - "It's Happening on Line 9" (with John Wagner, in Judge Dredd Annual 1983, 1982)
  - "Destiny's Angels" (with John Wagner and Alan Grant, in 2000 AD #281–288, 1982)
  - "The Executioner" (with John Wagner and Alan Grant, in 2000 AD #291–294, 1982)
  - "The Night of the Rad Beast" (with John Wagner and Alan Grant, in 2000 AD #296–297, 1982)
  - "The Prankster" (with John Wagner and Alan Grant, in 2000 AD #308, 1983)
  - "The Starborn Thing" (with John Wagner and Alan Grant, in 2000 AD #309–314, 1983)
  - "Condo" (with John Wagner and Alan Grant, in 2000 AD #319–321, 1983)
  - "The Other Slab Tynan" (with John Wagner, in Judge Dredd Annual 1984, 1983)
  - "Halloween" (with John Wagner, in Judge Dredd Annual 1984, 1983)
  - "Beat the Devil" (with John Wagner, in Judge Dredd Annual 1984, 1983)
  - "Requiem for a Heavyweight" (with John Wagner and Alan Grant, in 2000 AD #331–334, 1983)
  - "The Big Bang Theory" (with John Wagner and Alan Grant, in Judge Dredd Annual 1985, 1984)
  - "Tarantula" (with John Wagner and Alan Grant, in Judge Dredd Annual 1985, 1984)
  - "The Eat of the Night" (with John Wagner and Alan Grant, in Judge Dredd Annual 1985, 1984)
  - "John Brown's Body" (with John Wagner and Alan Grant, in Judge Dredd Annual 1986, 1985)
  - "Crazy R Raiders" (with John Wagner and Alan Grant, in Judge Dredd Annual 1986, 1985)
  - "The Man Who Knew Too Much" (with John Wagner and Alan Grant, in 2000 AD #438–439, 1985)
  - "Costa del Blood" (with John Wagner and Alan Grant, in Judge Dredd Annual 1989, 1988)
  - "Kirby's Demon" (with John Wagner, in 2000 AD #638, 1989)
  - "The Amazing Ant Man" (with John Wagner, in 2000 AD #640, 1989)
  - "Young Giant" (with John Wagner, in 2000 AD #651–655, 1989)
  - "By Lethal Injection" (with John Wagner, in 2000 AD #669–670, 1990)
  - "Rights of Succession" (with John Wagner, in 2000 AD #671, 1990)
  - "Dear Annie" (with John Wagner, in 2000 AD #672–673, 1990)
  - "Necropolis" (with John Wagner, in 2000 AD #674–699, 1990)
  - "Death Aid" (with Garth Ennis, in 2000 AD #711–715 & #719–720, 1990–1991)
  - "Return of the King" (with Garth Ennis, in 2000 AD #733–735, 1991)
  - "Judgement Day" (with John Wagner and Garth Ennis, in 2000 AD # 788–799, 1992)
  - "The Taking of Sector 123" (with Garth Ennis, in Judge Dredd Megazine vol. 2 #10–11, 1992)
  - "Christmas With Attitude" (with Garth Ennis, in 2000 AD #815, 1992)
  - "Inferno" (with Grant Morrison, in 2000 AD #842–853, 1993)
  - "I Hate Christmas" (with Mark Millar, in 2000 AD #867, 1993)
  - "Frankenstein Division" (with Mark Millar, in 2000 AD #868–871, 1994)
  - "Could You Be Judge Dredd?" (with John Wagner, in Judge Dredd Poster Prog #2, 1994)
  - "The Time Machine" (with John Wagner, in 2000 AD #889–890, 1994)
  - "The Tenth Planet" (with John Wagner, in Judge Dredd Megazine vol.2 #58–62, 1994)
  - "Wilderlands" (with John Wagner, in 2000 AD #904–914, 1994)
  - "Parting Shots" (with John Wagner, in 2000 AD #915, 1994)
  - "The Candidates" (with John Wagner, in 2000 AD #917, 1994)
  - "Voting Day" (with John Wagner, in 2000 AD #918, 1994)
  - "The Neon Man" (with John Wagner, in 2000 AD #951, 1995)
  - "Megalot" (with John Wagner, in 2000 AD #952, 1995)
  - "Bad Frendz" (with John Wagner, in 2000 AD #955–959, 1995)
  - "Awakening of Angels" (with John Wagner, in 2000 AD #958, 1995)
  - "The Pit" (with John Wagner, in 2000 AD #970–977, 1995–96)
  - "The Pit: Unjudicial Liaisons" (with John Wagner, in 2000 AD #987–989, 1996)
  - "The Pit: Bongo War" (with John Wagner, in 2000 AD #996–998, 1996)
  - "Beyond the Call of Duty" (with John Wagner, in 2000 AD #1101–1110, 1998)
  - "Sector House" (with John Wagner, in 2000 AD #1215–1222, 2000)
  - "Helter Skelter" (with Garth Ennis, in 2000 AD #1250–1257 & 1260–1261, 2001)
  - "Leaving Rowdy" (with John Wagner, in 2000 AD #1280, 2002)
  - "The Girlfriend" (with John Wagner, in Judge Dredd Megazine #4.15, 2002)
  - "Phartz!" (with John Wagner, in Judge Dredd Megazine #201, 2003)
  - "Sturm und Dang" (with Gordon Rennie, in Judge Dredd Megazine #211–212, 2003)
  - "Brothers Of The Blood" (with John Wagner, in 2000 AD #1378–1381, 2004)
  - "The Monsterus Mashinashuns of P.J. Maybe" (with John Wagner, in Judge Dredd Megazine #231–234, 2005)
  - "Matters Of Life And Death" (with Gordon Rennie, in 2000 AD #1452, 2005)
  - "Origins" (with John Wagner, in 2000 AD #1505–1519, #1529–1535 and #2007, 2006–2007)
  - "Tour of Duty: Mega-City Justice" (with John Wagner and Hector Ezquerra, in 2000 AD #1687–1693, 2010)
  - "The Adjudicators" (with Si Spurrier, in Judge Dredd Megazine #323–324, 2012)
  - "Block Judge" (with John Wagner, in 2000 AD #1900–1909, 2014)
  - "El Maldito" (with Gordon Rennie, in Judge Dredd Megazine #361–364, 2015)
  - "Ladykiller" (with John Wagner, in 2000 AD #1991–1998, 2016)
  - "From the Ashes" (with Michael Carroll, in Judge Dredd Megazine #374, 2016)
  - "By Private Contract (with John Wagner, in 2000 AD #2000, 2016)
  - "Get Jerry Sing" (with John Wagner, in 2000 AD #2023, 2017)
- Strontium Dog:

All stories written by John Wagner unless otherwise stated.

  - "Max Quirxx" (Starlord #1–2, 1978)
  - "Papa Por-ka" (Starlord #3–5, 1978)
  - "No Cure For Kansyr" (Starlord #6–7, 1978)
  - "Planet of the Dead"(Starlord #8–10, 1978)
  - "Two-Faced Terror!" (Starlord #12–15, 1978)
  - "The Ultimate Weapon" (Starlord #21–22, 1978)
  - "The Galaxy Killers" (2000 AD #86–94, 1978)
  - "Journey Into Hell" (2000 AD #104–118, 1979)

All stories below written by John Wagner and Alan Grant writing in partnership, unless otherwise stated.

  - "Death’s Head" (2000 AD #178–181, 1980)
  - "The Schicklgruber Grab" (2000 AD #182–188, 1980)
  - "Mutie’s Luck" (2000 AD #189, 1980)
  - "The Doc Quince Case" (2000 AD #190–193, 1980–81)
  - "The Bad Boys Bust" (2000 AD #194–197, 1981)
  - "Portrait Of A Mutant" (2000 AD #200–206, 210–221, 1981)
  - "The Gronk Affair" (2000 AD #224–227, 1981)
  - "The Kid Knee Caper" (2000 AD #228–233, 1981)
  - "The Moses Incident" (2000 AD #335–345, 1983)
  - "The Killing" (2000 AD #350–359, 1984)
  - "Outlaw!" (2000 AD #363–385, 1984)
  - "The Big Bust Of ’49" (2000 AD #415–424, 1985)
  - "The Slavers Of Drule" (2000 AD #425–436, 1985)
  - "Max Bubba" (2000 AD #445–465, 1985–86)
  - "Smiley’s World" (2000 AD #466–467, 1986)
  - "Rage" (2000 AD #469–489, 1986)
  - "Incident on Mayjer Minor" (2000 AD #490–496, 1986)
  - "Warzone!" (2000 AD #497–499, 1986)
  - "The Beast of Milton Keynes" (written by Alan Grant; 2000 AD Annual 1986)
  - "Bitch" (2000 AD #505–529, 1987)
  - "The Royal Affair" (2000 AD #532–536, 1987)
  - "The Rammy" (2000 AD #544–553, 1987)
  - "The Stone Killers" (written by Grant alone; 2000 AD #560–572, 1988)
  - "Incident On Zeta" (written by Grant alone; plot suggested by Carlos Ezquerra; 2000 AD #573, 1988)
  - "Complaint" (2000 AD Annual 1988)

All stories below written by John Wagner alone.

  - "The Kreeler Conspiracy" 2000 AD #2000, 1174–1180, 1195–1199 (1999–2000)
  - "The Sad Case" 2000 AD #2001 (2000)
  - "Roadhouse" 2000 AD #1300–1308 (2002)
  - "The Tax Dodge" 2000 AD #1350–1358 (2003)
  - "The Headly Foot Job" 2000 AD #1400–1403 (2004)
  - "Traitor To His Kind" 2000 AD #1406–1415 (2004)
  - "A Shaggy Dog Story" 2000 AD #2006, 1469–1472 (2005–06)
  - "The Glum Affair" 2000 AD #2008, 1567–1576 (2007–08)
  - "Blood Moon" (inking and colours by Hector Ezquerra from episode 2) 2000 AD #2009, 1617–1628 (2008–09)
  - "The Mork Whisperer" (inking and colours by Hector Ezquerra) 2000 AD #1651–1660 (2009)
  - "The Life and Death of Johnny Alpha" (inking and colours by Hector Ezquerra) 2000 AD #1689–1699 (2010)
  - "The Life and Death of Johnny Alpha: The Project" (inking and colours by Hector Ezquerra) 2000 AD #2012, 1764–1771 (2011–12)
  - "What If...? Max Bubba Hadn't Killed Wulf," written by Alan Grant. 2000 AD #1772 (2012)
  - "The Life and Death of Johnny Alpha: Mutant Spring" 2000 AD #2013, 1813–1821 (2012–13)
  - "The Life and Death of Johnny Alpha: Dogs of War" 2000 AD #2014, 1862–1870 (2013–14)
  - "The Stix Fix" 2000 AD #1924–1933 (2015)
  - "Repo Men" 2000 AD #1961–1971 (2015–2016)
  - "The Son" 2000 AD #2073–2081 (2018)
- Rick Random (in 2000 AD #118, 1979)
- Tharg the Mighty:
  - "A Close Encounter of the Fatal Kind!" (in 2000 AD #102, 1979)
  - "A Day in the Life of the Mighty Tharg" (in 2000 AD #129, 1979)
  - Tharg The Mighty (in 2000 AD # 145-46, 1979)
  - Tharg the Mighty (in 2000 AD # 155 & 162, 1980)
  - Tharg the Mighty (in 2000 AD # 176-77 & 180-82, 1980)
  - Tharg the Mighty (in 2000 AD # 304, 1983)
  - Tharg the Mighty (in 2000 AD # 435-36, 1985)
  - Tharg the Mighty (in 2000 AD # 443, 1985)
  - Tharg the Mighty (in 2000 AD Winter Special # 3, 1990)
- ABC Warriors (with Pat Mills):
  - "Golgotha" (in 2000 AD #134–136, 1979)
  - "The Shadow Warriors Book I" (in 2000 AD #1336–1341, 2003)
- The Stainless Steel Rat (with Kelvin Gosnell, tpb, 208 pages, July 2010, ISBN 1-906735-51-4):
  - "The Stainless Steel Rat" (in 2000 AD #140–151, 1979–1980)
  - "The Stainless Steel Rat Saves the World" (in 2000 AD #166–177, 1980)
  - "The Stainless Steel Rat for President" (in 2000 AD #393–404, 1984–1985)
- Fiends of the Eastern Front (with Gerry Finley-Day, in 2000 AD #152–161, 1980; tpb ISBN 1-904265-64-2)
- Third World War (with Pat Mills):
  - Book 1 (in Crisis #1–6 and 9–14, 1988)
  - "Back in Babylon" (in Crisis #17, 1989)
  - Untitled (in Crisis #18, 1989)
  - "All about Eve" (in Crisis #20–21, 1989)
- Anderson: Psi Division: "The Random Man " (with Alan Grant, in 2000 AD #657–659, 1989)
- Durham Red:
  - "Island of the Damned" (written by Alan Grant, in 2000 AD #762–773, 1991)
  - "The Golden Mile" (written by Alan Grant, in 2000AD Yearbook 1993)
  - The Scarlet Apocrypha: "Red Menace" (written by Dan Abnett, in Judge Dredd Megazine vol. 4 no. 17, 2002)
  - "The 'Nobody Wants This Job' Job" (written by Alan Grant, in 2000 AD #1785–1790, 2012)
  - "The Judas Strain" (written by Lauren Beukes and Dale Halvorsen, in 2000 AD 40th Anniversary Special, 2017)
- Al's Baby (with John Wagner):
  - Al's Baby (in Judge Dredd Megazine vol.1 # 4–15 1991)
  - Al's Baby (in Judge Dredd Megazine vol.2 # 16–24 1992–93)
  - Al's Baby (in 2000 AD # 1034–1044, 1997)
- Armageddon: "The Bad Man" (with Alan Grant, in Judge Dredd Megazine vol. 2 #1–7, 1992)
- Purgatory (with Mark Millar, in 2000 AD #834–841, 1993)
- Janus: Psi-Division: "Will o' the Wisp" (with Grant Morrison, in 2000 AD Winter Special 1993, 1993)
- Lobo Annual #2 (with Alan Grant, DC, 1994)
- Bob, the Galactic Bum (with Alan Grant and John Wagner, 4-issue mini-series, DC, 1995)
- Judge Dredd: The Official Movie Adaptation (with Andrew Helfer, DC, 1995)
- Lobo Gallery: Portraits of a Bastich (DC, 1995)
- Lobo: I Quit (with Alan Grant, DC, 1995)
- Bloody Mary (with Garth Ennis, Vertigo, tpb, 2005 ISBN 1-4012-0725-1):
  - "Bloody Mary" (DC/Helix, 4 issue mini-series, 1996)
  - "Bloody Mary: Lady Liberty" (DC/Helix, 4 issue mini-series, 1998)
- Hitman (with Garth Ennis, in Pulp Heroes Annual #1, DC Comics, 1997)
- Batman: Legends of the Dark Knight #101 (with John Wagner, December 1997)
- Preacher (with Garth Ennis, Vertigo, included in Preacher, Volume 4: Proud Americans, tpb, March 1998, ISBN 978-1-56389-405-3):
  - Preacher Special: Saint of Killers #3 (4-issue mini-series, October 1996, included in Preacher, Book 3, hardcover, December 2010, ISBN 978-1-4012-3016-6)
  - Preacher Special: The Good Old Boys (one-shot, August 1997, included in Preacher, Book 4, hardcover, June 2011, ISBN 978-1-4012-3093-7)
- Mara Jade: By the Emperor's Hand (with Timothy Zahn and Michael A. Stackpole, Dark Horse, tpb collects Star Wars: Mara Jade – By The Emperor's Hand #1–6, 1999 ISBN 1-56971-401-0)
- War Story: Condors (with Garth Ennis, Vertigo, 2003; collected in War Stories volume 2)
- Adventures in the Rifle Brigade (with Garth Ennis, Vertigo, tpb collects both mini-series, 2004: ISBN 1-4012-0353-1):
  - "Adventures in the Rifle Brigade" (3 issue mini-series, 2000)
  - "Operation Bollock" (3 issue mini-series, 2001)
- Just a Pilgrim (with Garth Ennis, complete hardcover, Dynamite Entertainment, 2009, ISBN 1-60690-003-X) collects:
  - Just a Pilgrim (Black Bull, 5 issues, 2001, tpb, 2001 ISBN 1-84023-377-X)
  - Just a Pilgrim: Garden of Eden (Black Bull, 4 issues, 2002, tpb, 2003 ISBN 1-84023-590-X)
- Cursed Earth Koburn (with Gordon Rennie):
  - "Kuss Hard" (in Judge Dredd Megazine #221–223, 2004)
  - "Burial Party" (in Judge Dredd Megazine #228, 2005)
  - "The Assizes" (in Judge Dredd Megazine #239, 2005)
  - "Malachi" (in Judge Dredd Megazine #240–244, 2006)
  - "Going After Billy Zane" (in Judge Dredd Megazine #314–318, 2011)
  - "The Law of the Cursed Earth" (written by Rory McConville, in Judge Dredd Megazine #392–396, 2018)
- Kev Hawkins (with Garth Ennis):
  - The Magnificent Kevin (DC/Wildstorm, 5 issues, 2005, tpb, 2006, ISBN 1-4012-0990-4)
  - A Man Called Kev (5-issue mini-series, 2006, June 2007, ISBN 1-4012-1324-3)
- Battlefields (with Garth Ennis, Dynamite Entertainment):
  - Tankies (3-issue mini-series, April–July 2009, tpb, 88 pages, September 2009, ISBN 1-60690-057-9, included in The Complete Battlefields, Volume 1, hardcover, 268 pages, December 2009, ISBN 1-60690-079-X)
  - The Firefly and His Majesty (3-issue mini-series, March–May 2010, tpb, 80 pages, August 2010, ISBN 1-60690-145-1, included in The Complete Battlefields, Volume 2, hardcover, 200 pages, July 2011, ISBN 1-60690-222-9)
- Spector (with John Wagner, in 2000 AD Sci-Fi Special, June 2019)

==== Collected editions ====
Some of Ezquerra's more recent Judge Dredd and Cursed Earth Koburn work has been collected into one volume:

- Judge Dredd: The Carlos Ezquerra Collection (224 pages, Rebellion, ISBN 1-905437-35-8)
- Ezquerra, Carlos (14 June 2022). The Art of Carlos Ezquerra. ISBN 978-1-78618-567-9.

=== Toys ===
He drew the artwork on the header cards for Corgi model's range of X-Ploratron die-cast models. (Diecast Collector Magazine, September 2006 issue, page 38)

The four X-Ploratron models were;

- Corgi Model Number 2022; "X4 Scanotron"
- Corgi Model Number 2023; "X1 Rocketron"
- Corgi Model Number 2024; "X2 Lasertron"
- Corgi Model Number 2026; "X3 Magnetron"
