= Morgyn the Mighty =

British comic strip

Morgyn the Mighty is a British action-adventure comic strip about a super-strong shipwreck survivor. The strip debuted in 1928, created by Dudley D. Watkins, and continued to be published until about 1968.

== Publication history ==
The strip first appeared as the text story "Morgyn the Mighty" in 1928 in The Rover. The first picture strip version now entitled Morgyn the Mighty appeared in the first issue of The Beano in 1938, this strip ended in the same year it began. In 1951 the strip was put in the comic The Rover, but was transferred to Victor Book for Boys in 1963. The strip was drawn by Dudley D. Watkins for D. C. Thomson. Watkins later drew a similar story, Strang the Terrible, for the Beano during the 1940s. Morgyn would appear in further adventures throughout the Victor's publication run.

A similar character named Strang the Terrible first appeared as text stories in DC Thomsons story paper Adventure in 1936. Strang then reappeared in 1944 in the pages of The Beano as a comic strip. Some of Strang's adventures, this time in colour comic strip form, from Adventure were reprinted in The Rover but were retitled Morgyn the Mighty and were now black and white.

A Morgyn the Mighty book was published in 1951.

== Fictional character biography ==
Morgyn the Mighty is reputedly the world's strongest man. In the first storyline he is the sole survivor of the shipwrecked schooner Hebrides, stranded on Black Island. He uses his strength and talents to fight wild beasts and become master of the island.
