= Matt Braddock =

- Matt Braddock

Publication information
- Publisher: D. C. Thomson & Co. Ltd
- First appearance: 1952

In-story information
- Team affiliations: Royal Air Force, United Kingdom
- Abilities: Master pilot, skilled boxer, champion level darts player.

Matt Braddock, VC and bar, is a fictional World War II bomber pilot who first appeared in prose adventures in the story paper The Rover in 1952, and later as a comic strip in The Victor (1961–83) and Warlord (1974). Some of his stories were published in book form as I Flew With Braddock.

Braddock was known for his fearless nature, superb piloting skills and no-nonsense attitude. He had no time for petty rules and regulations, and remained at the rank of sergeant, refusing to be promoted to an officer rank. However, this did not stop him from standing up to incompetent superiors, or defending other enlisted men from overzealous courts-martial. He spent almost as much time clashing with superior officers as the Germans, and on two occasions in I Flew With Braddock he came fairly close to being court-martialled for assaulting a superior officer (although one incident was a misunderstanding and the other was under severe provocation). The narrator of these stories was his hero-worshipping navigator, George Bourne (a Dr. Watson-type narrator, a relatively sophisticated device for juvenile fiction).

Braddock was so highly regarded that he had carte blanche to pick his own flight crew, and was frequently called upon to advise high-ranking commanders of the RAF. Braddock flew several types of aircraft, but his most prominent command was the Lancaster Bomber "F Fox". At the start of I Flew With Braddock the crew was Braddock and Bourne, co-pilot and flight engineer 'Ham' Hancox, bomb aimer Tom Tanner, radio operator 'Nicker' Brown, mid-upper gunner 'Hoppy' Robinson, and tail gunner Les Howe. Les Howe clashed with Braddock early on and was replaced by 'Baa' Lamb, and later 'Hoppy' Robinson was badly injured in a raid and replaced by Arthur Atkins.

Some of Braddock's more outstanding exploits included:

- Sinking a U-boat with a rocket-armed Mosquito fighter-bomber.
- Bombing Peenemünde, severely setting back German rocketry experiments.
- Successfully traversing the Alps to attack an Italian port, after the entire raid had been scrubbed due to hazardous weather.
- Shooting down a German fighter with a flare gun.
- Sinking the Degen, a German aircraft carrier. This was notable in that Braddock successfully bombed the ship after his plane was damaged by anti-aircraft fire, destroying the bomb sight and knocking out his bomb aimer. Braddock himself took the responsibility of dropping the bomb, and managed to score a direct hit with the naked eye.

I Flew With Braddock also included some genuine episodes in the British bomber offensive against Germany e.g. the first thousand bomber raid on Cologne, and developments such as the GEE navigation system, Pathfinder units and the "Pink Pansy" incendiary bomb.

Braddock, in addition to his piloting abilities, was a skilled boxer and champion level darts player. In the stories set in the pre-war period, he is portrayed as a steeplejack who took flying lessons and then joined the auxiliary air force.

The author of these stories was not clearly stated (I Flew With Braddock just gave the author as "George Bourne", the fictional narrator) but is believed to be Gilbert Lawford Dalton.
