= Wilson the Wonder Athlete =

British comic strip (1943–1984)

Publication information
- Publisher: D. C. Thomson & Co.
- First appearance: The Wizard #1029 (24 July 1943)
- Created by: Gilbert Lawford Dalton

In-story information
- Alter ego: William Wilson

Wilson the Wonder Athlete was a British comic strip, first published in 1943 in the British illustrated story paper The Wizard published by D. C. Thomson & Co. It follows the sporting adventures of a heroic character named William Wilson. The stories were written by Gilbert Lawford Dalton and drawn by Jack Glass. The stories ran until 1984 in various British magazines.

== Publication history ==
The character first appeared in issue 1029 Wizard (24 July 1943) in a story titled "The Truth About Wilson". The first adventure introduced Wilson as a supreme athlete, who joins a race from out of the crowd and manages to record a three-minute mile. The character's adventures were written by Gilbert Lawford Dalton using the pen name W S K Webb, and a book, The Truth About Wilson collected a number of the text stories in the 1960s. Thought by Paul Gravett to be the prototype of the "astonishing sporting prodigies" who became popular in British comics, (cf. Alf Tupper, Roy of the Rovers), Gravett describes him as an "unassuming totally dedicated loner, [wanting] no glory or publicity". Although his stories were initially told in prose, a move to the comic papers The Hornet and Hotspur saw the character depicted in comic strip form. The character was later revived for D.C. Thomson's Spike comic of 1983 to 1984, initially within a comic strip with art by Neville Wilson. Referred to as The Man in Black, the character was revealed to be Wilson in the course of the story, with reprints of the older material published within the comic as Wilson's diaries.

== Fictional character biography ==
William Wilson was born in the village of Stayling in Yorkshire and claimed to be born on 1 November 1795. However a document dated 11 March 1774 listed him as "clerk to the manor". He was sufficiently old that when writing, he used an "f" instead of an "s". His farmer father died in middle age, leaving Wilson £5,000. He studied medicine and biology in a number of countries around the world and determined not to die early as so many he knew had, he worked out a health and fitness regime and learned how to slow his heart right down, using a formula created by people who could live to over 200. He developed his will power and hardened his body by whole winters spent in the open. Squadron leader W. Wilson D.S.O., D.F.C. and bar, who had 25 victories to his name, was shot down during the Second World War and was officially listed as missing.

The character is depicted within stories as performing a number of improbable events. Wilson was seen in one strip becoming the first man to climb Everest, and another saw him captaining an England cricket team to The Ashes in Australia. Originally hailing from Yorkshire, and living in a cave on a diet of nuts and berries, Wilson exemplified British grit and the stiff upper lip.

== Reception ==
According to The Guardian he "was hailed as a welcome wartime morale booster", while The Telegraph remembers him as a "focused and intense individual ... [with no] recorded instance of him smiling or cracking a joke." In 2004 artist John Reynolds acquired the licence to reproduce images of Wilson as large screen-print canvases. Former Guinness Book of Records deputy editor and athletics statistician, Ian Smith, cites the character as an inspiration, and he inspired many British athletes in their careers as well as Belgian cyclist Eddy Merckx. The character is still used in newspaper reports on sport as a cultural reference point.

== Tributes ==
Comedian and actor Billy Connolly wore a black leotard on stage during the 1970s as a tribute to Wilson.
