= Hornet (DC Thomson) =

British comic published by D. C. Thomson & Co.

The Hornet was a British boys' comic published by D. C. Thomson & Co. for 648 issues from 14 September 1963 to 7 February 1976, after which it was merged with The Hotspur. The gift with the first issue was a balsa wood "Kestral Glider".

== Notable strips and characters ==
- The Blazing Ace of Spades - starring Richard Starr, a ruthless World War II fighter pilot
- V for Vengeance (1965–75; 1976–80 The Hotspur) - starring the Deathless Men, masked concentration camp escapees who first appeared in prose format in The Wizard in 1942.
- William Wilson, first appeared in prose format in The Wizard in 1943, appeared in picture form in The Hornet starting on 12 September 1964.
