= Wolf of Kabul =

Fictional character

William Sampson or Samson, the Wolf of Kabul, was a literary character in British boys' papers published by D. C. Thomson & Co. He first appeared in The Wizard in 1922.

== Publication history ==
When the Wolf of Kabul series began, The Wizard, like the other D. C. Thomson titles, was a story paper with illustrations. The series reappeared in comic format in issue 102 of The Hotspur in 1961, and ran there until 1975. It appeared in Buddy from 1981 to 1983. Meanwhile Warlord included a prequel series, Young Wolf, about Sampson's childhood, starting with its first issue in 1974.

== Description ==
Second Lieutenant Bill Sampson was an agent of the British Intelligence Corps on the Northwest Frontier. Disguised as a native (but given away by his blue eyes), he was armed only with two knives, while his Oriental sidekick, Chung, made devastating use of a cricket bat bound with brass, which he called "clicky-ba":

Clicky-ba thundered, and men with crushed heads squirmed on the path. Dreadful sounds echoed up the cliffs as the vanguard of Yahaw Khan's army swung this way and that, retreating and advancing in turns ... In sheer desperation they attacked, but found themselves opposed not only by Chung, but by the twin daggers of the Wolf. He used those blades with a skill that had yet to be equalled. When he struck it was as sure as the attack of a snake. Men dropped. The daggers in the hands of the Wolf were red to their silver hilts.

Chung often apologised for his headbashing: "Lord, I am full of humble sorrow—I did not mean to knock down these men—'clicky-ba' merely turned in my hand".

One scholar has suggested that Samson and Chung were based on Major Lumsden and Dilawar Khan in the first year of the Boy's Own Paper, 1879. Chung,"apparently a Tibetan", was depicted as being as much a hero as the Wolf.

During the Second World War, like other D. C. Thomson comics heroes, the Wolf and Chung combatted Nazis. In 1941 they went behind Italian lines in Libya, and Chung stopped an Italian officer from torturing prisoners:

It was the last command that ever passed his lips. The foliage of a nearby tree rustled and a strange object flashed down. It landed with a thud on the soldier's helmet and even his steel helmet failed to protect his skull.

The object which had hurtled down was a cricket bat, much battered and ominously stained. The blade was split and bound in places with lengths of brass wire.

'Ho! I crack skulls!' howled a terrible voice. 'Tremble, little men who serve He-of-the-Chin! The Shadow of the Wolf falls upon you!'

== In popular culture ==
In The League of Extraordinary Gentlemen, the Wolf of Kabul appears in Black Dossier as William Samson, Jr., son of the League's coach driver in Volume II, William Samson, Sr. He joins a hastily strung-together version of the League commanded by Joan Worralson. However, her repeated rebuffing of his advances strains relations, albeit not for long, because Worralson's League collapses on its first mission.

== Sources ==
- "Batting for England". The Spectator. 3 February 1973. p. 145.
