= Gorgeous Gus =

British comic strip

Gorgeous Gus was a British comic strip which appeared from 1950 on in the British comic book magazines The Wizard and Victor Book for Boys. The artist was Bert Vandeput.

== Concept ==
Gorgeous Gus was a British aristocrat, the Earl of Boote, who was the owner of Redburn Rovers football club. He was nicknamed "Gorgeous Gus" by the fans because of his aristocratic airs and graces. For example, he would sit on the sidelines during games, attended to by his faithful butler Jenkins. As a goalkeeper his approach to the game relied on minimal but very effective expenditure of effort. Instead of leaping to save a high shot, he would turn to face his goal and wait for the ball to strike the crossbar before rebounding straight into his hands at a more convenient height to catch.
