= Gilbert Lawford Dalton =

British children's writer and comics writer

Gilbert Lawford Dalton (1904–1963) was a British children's writer and comics writer. He was most prolific as an author of stories for British boys' comics for DC Thomson publications.

He wrote under several pseudonyms so the extent of his writing may not be entirely clear, but is believed to include Wilson the Wonder Athlete, Alf Tupper and Matt Braddock.

Clive James wrote that he enjoyed the stories of Matt Braddock and Alf Tupper as a boy, without realising at the time that they were intended as fantasy figures for working-class readers.
