= The Drouth =

Scottish quarterly periodical

The Drouth is a magazine and website based in Glasgow, Scotland. It was founded in 2001 by Mitchell Miller and Johnny Rodger as an American-format quarterly periodical.

Although its title is Scots (Eng: The Thirst), the magazine is published mostly in Scottish Standard English, with features and fiction regularly appearing in languages such as French, Italian, Spanish, Broad Scots and Scottish Gaelic.

The Drouth is unusual for a Scottish literary magazine in that it only infrequently publishes poetry, arguing that as poetry covers a good portion of other magazines' content, its efforts are better focused on other art-forms less well represented in Scotland's "small mags". The magazine works on a commissioning basis, and does not encourage unsolicited submissions. It has a particular focus on literature, film, and politics but also covers visual art, music, architecture, photography, and comix, as well as giving generous space to creative fiction.

The magazine sponsors a number of cultural events, mostly in Glasgow. Every issue also features a guest editor (usually someone of distinction in a given field) and guest cover artist.

In 2019, The Drouth received funding from Creative Scotland's Open Project Fund to develop a web version of the magazine.

== Editorial stance ==
The Drouth's editorial stance could be described as non-aligned left with occasional anarchistic and libertarian overtones, as shown by its ties to radical online publications such as Pulse and Spinwatch, and with the author James Kelman. Nevertheless, it also publishes work by more establishment figures on the left and right of the political spectrum, and editorial board members such as Owen Dudley Edwards retain links to the Scottish National Party and Plaid Cymru. The magazine is a frequent critic of the Scottish Labour Party but maintains it follows no party alignment, and is uncommitted on the issue of Scottish independence.

In general, the magazine has taken an aggressively non-institutional stance and has found common cause with magazines such as Variant, though it retains an independent approach on political issues and does not maintain formal links with major organisations and institutions. Its editorial board is nevertheless, drawn from a mainly institutional background across the two major Scottish cities and currently consists of:

- David Archibald, Lecturer, Dept of Film Theatre and Television The University of Glasgow (2006–present)
- Gerard Carruthers, Head of Dept of Scottish Literature, The University of Glasgow (2001–present)
- Steve Davismoon, Composer and lecturer at Napier University, Edinburgh (2003–present)
- Owen Dudley Edwards, Reader in History, The University of Edinburgh (2001–present)
- Dorian Grieve, Editor and Researcher in Linguistics, University of Glasgow (2004–present)
- Simon Kovesi, Head of English and Modern Languages, Oxford Brookes University (2009–present)
- Emily Munro, Head of Learning, Glasgow Film Theatre (2008–present)
- Ruaridh Nicoll, Journalist and novelist (2004–present)
- Miriam Ross, Researcher in film and related studies (also web editor) (2010)
- Elke Weissmann, Lecturer, Liverpool Edgehill University

Editorial board members primarily offer advice, but can also commission work, initiate ideas for issues and get involved in production. Several editorial board members were initially guest editors who joined the permanent staff.

== Guest editors ==
Since issue 6, a guest editor has been invited to contribute editorial essays and advice. There has been no guest editor for issues 9, 25 and 33, and the lineup has included pseudonymous and spoof entries. The full list is as follows;

- Issue 6: "Fact", Frank Kuppner, novelist
- Issue 7: "Complexity", Edwin Morgan, poet
- Issue 8: "Panegyric", Jenni Calder, writer
- Issue 10: "Word"
- Issue 11: "Monument", Miles Glendinning, architectural critic
- Issue 12: "Bigotry", Gowan Calder, actress
- Issue 13: "Intelligence", Christopher Harvie, writer and academic
- Issue 14: "Land", Ruaridh Nicoll, journalist and novelist
- Issue 15: "Consensus and Revision", Sarah Dunnigan, expert on ballads
- Issue 16: "Didactic", Muhammad Idrees Ahmad, media analyst
- Issue 17: "Form", Elke Weissmann, cultural critic and researcher in television studies
- Issue 18: "Class", Willy Maley, writer and academic
- Issue 19: "Dialect", Carol Baranuik, expert on Ullans (Ulster Scots)
- Issue 20: "Image", John Calcutt, Lecturer at Glasgow School of art
- Issue 21: "Document", Jonathan Murray, expert on Scottish cinema and history
- Issue 22: "Utopia", Sheila Dickson, academic and translator
- Issue 23: "Deviant", Mark Cousins, critic and filmmaker
- Issue 24: "Skin", Craig Richardson, artist and academic
- Issue 26: "Collect", Rosemary Goring, Arts Editor, The Herald
- Issue 27: "Pure", Emily Munro, writer and film programmer
- Issue 28: "Establishment", Molly Maguire, poet
- Issue 29: "Union", Ian S. Wood, historian
- Issue 30: "Public", Ashley Shelby Benites, author
- Issue 31: "Rhetoric", John Knox, reformer
- Issue 32: "Moral", Jen Birks, media analyst
- Issue 34: "Lost", Rhona Brown, writer and academic
- Issue 35: "Process", Simon Kovesi, critic and academic
- Issue 57: Music, Stuart Smith and Elodie Roy

== Guest artists ==
Since issue 14, guest artists from fine art, illustration, photography and even film, have been invited to provide covers to each issue -

- Issue 14: "Land", David Shrigley, installation
- Issue 15: "Consensus and Revision", Margaret Tait, experimental film
- Issue 16: "Didactic", Andreas Kaiser, installation
- Issue 17: "Form", Toby Paterson, painting
- Issue 18: "Class", Ken Currie, painting
- Issue 19: "Dialect", Mark Neville, photography/performance
- Issue 20: "Image", Alasdair Gray, illustration
- Issue 21: "Document", Aaron Valdez, experimental film
- Issue 22: "Utopia", Stephan Klenner Otto, illustration
- Issue 23: "Deviant", Louise Galea, photography.
- Issue 24: "Skin", Craig Richardson, installation
- Issue 25: "Epic/Lyric", Euan Sutherland, illustration
- Issue 26: "Collect", Andrew Lee, photography
- Issue 27: "Pure", John Kay, illustration
- Issue 28: "Establishment', Stuart Murray, illustration
- Issue 29: "Union", Steve Ovett Effect, performance/illustration
- Issue 30: "Public", Bill Breckinridge, photography
- Issue 31: "Rhetoric", Alexandra Demenkova, documentary photography
- Issue 32: "Moral", Stephen Healy, photography
- Issue 33: "Solution", Chris Dooks, photography
- Issue 34: "Lost", Ian McCulloch, painting
- Issue 35: "Process", Roddy Buchanan, photography

== Books and related media ==
The Drouth has published two books based partly on essays and features that first appeared in its pages. In 2009 it published Fickle Man: Robert Burns in the 21st Century (Sandstone Press) and in 2010, Tartan Pimps: Gordon Brown, Margaret Thatcher & the New Scotland (Argyll Publishing).

== Notable contributors ==
- Angus Calder
- Gowan Calder
- Jenni Calder
- Eddie Campbell
- Noam Chomsky
- Jem Cohen
- Ken Currie
- Stephen Davismoon
- Owen Dudley Edwards
- Roberto Fabbriciani
- John Gray
- Dorian Grieve
- Murray Grigor
- Sileas na Keppoch
- Simon Kovesi
- Frank Kuppner
- Carl MacDougall
- Donald MacLeod
- Edwin Morgan
- Jonny Murray
- Ruaridh Nicoll
- Andrew O'Hagan
- Paul O’Keeffe
- Juana Ponce de Leon
- Jake Mahaffy
- George Monbiot
- Ashley Shelby
- David Stenhouse
- Sherien Sultan

== See also ==
- List of magazines published in Scotland
