= Ibdes =

Municipality located in Zaragoza, Aragon, Spain

- municipality
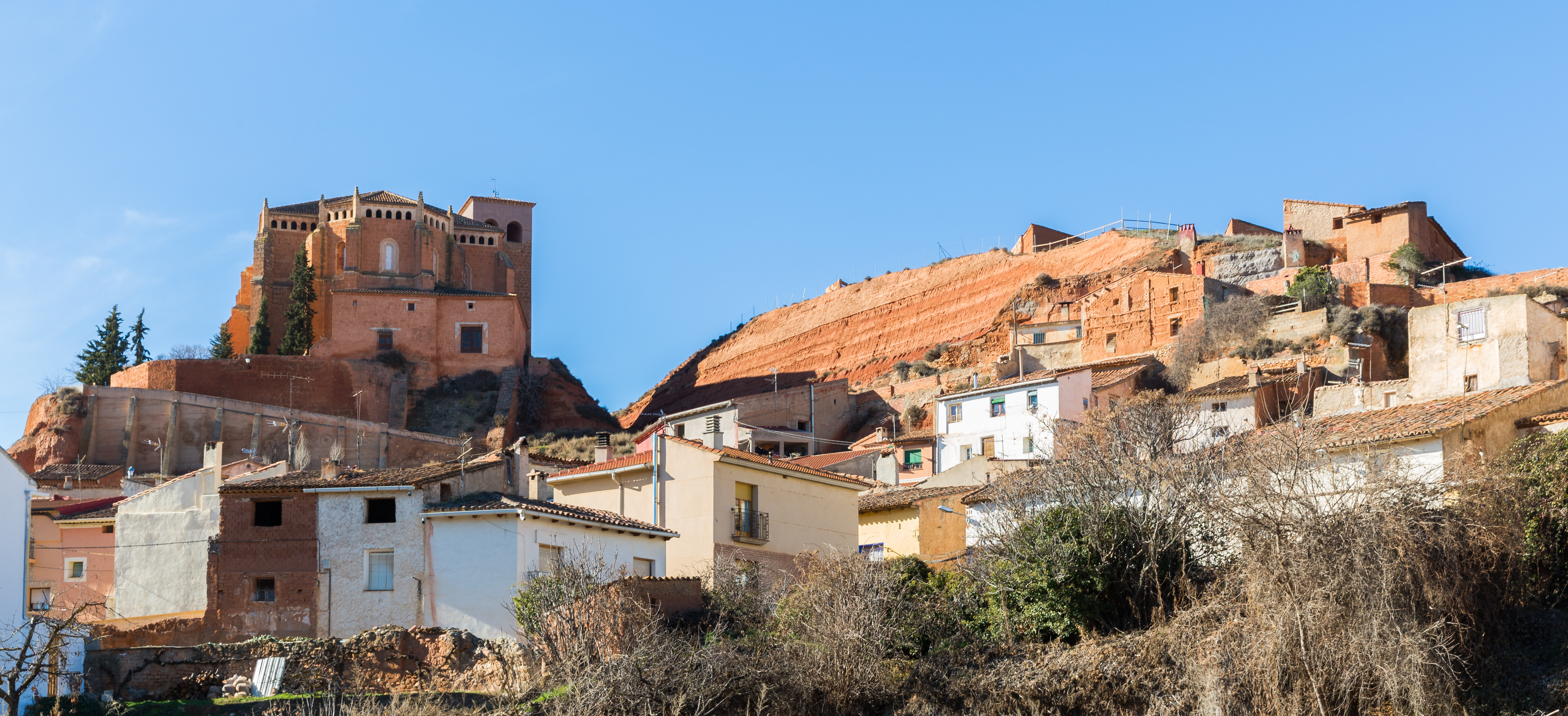

- Coat of arms

- Location within Aragon Location within Spain Location within Europe
- Country: Spain
- Autonomous community: Aragon
- Province: Zaragoza

Area
  - Total: 56 km^{2} (22 sq mi)

Population (2025-01-01)
  - Total: 351
  - Density: 6.3/km^{2} (16/sq mi)
- Time zone: UTC+1 (CET)
  - Summer (DST): UTC+2 (CEST)

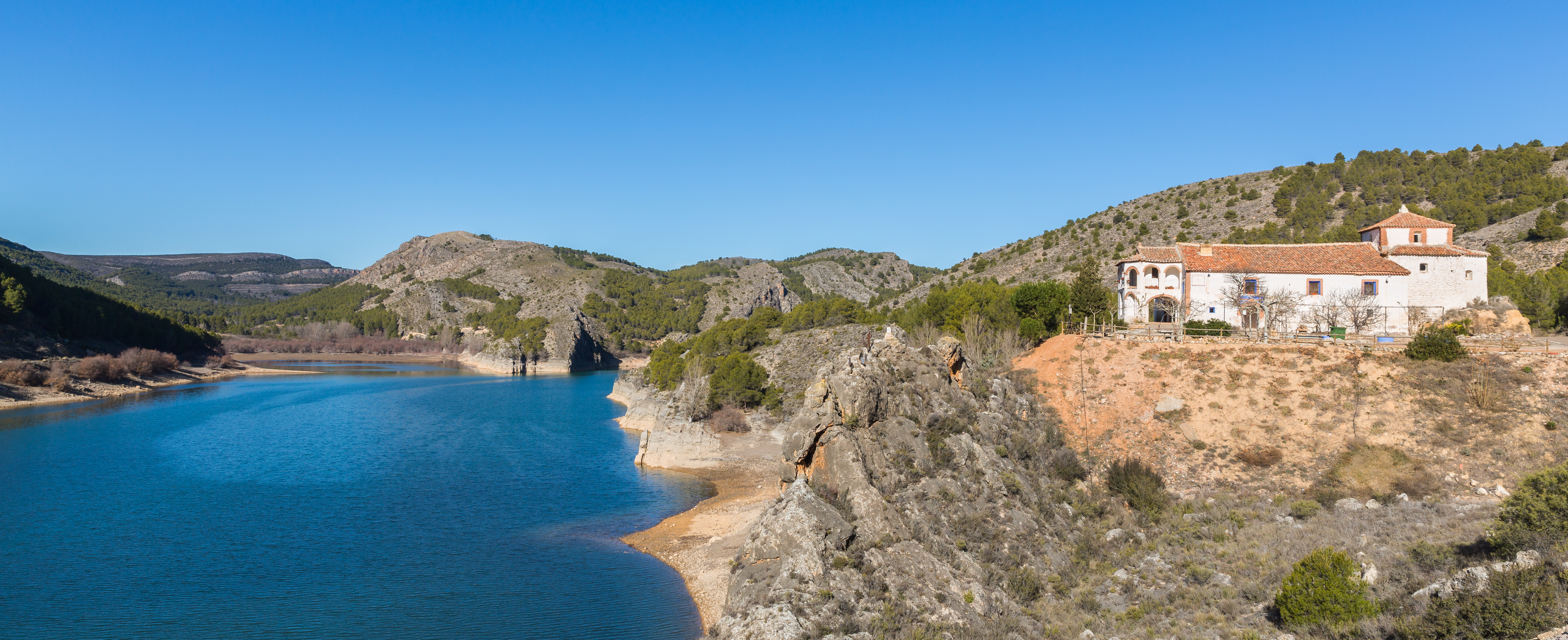
Hermitage of St Daniel, Ibdes.

Ibdes (Spanish pronunciation: [ˈiβðes]) is a municipality located in the province of Zaragoza, Aragon, Spain. According to the 2004 census (INE), the municipality has a population of 541 inhabitants.

== Notable people ==
- Carlos Ezquerra (comics artist)
- Jerónimo de Pasamonte (soldier and writer, believed by some to be the real identity of Alonso Fernández de Avellaneda)

== See also ==
- List of municipalities in Zaragoza
