= Just a Pilgrim =

2001 comic book limited series

- Cover to Just a Pilgrim #1; Art by Mark Texeira

Publication information
- Publisher: Black Bull Comics
- Schedule: Monthly
- Format: Limited series
- Genre: Post-apocalyptic
- Publication date: May 2001 - September 2001; May 2002 - August 2002
- No. of issues: 5; 4

Creative team
- Created by: Garth Ennis; Carlos Ezquerra
- Written by: Garth Ennis
- Artist: Carlos Ezquerra
- Letterer: Chris Eliopoulos
- Colorist: Paul Mounts
- Editor: Jimmy Palmiotti

Collected editions
- Just a Pilgrim: ISBN 1-84023-377-X
- Just a Pilgrim: Garden of Eden: ISBN 1-84023-590-X
- The Complete Just a Pilgrim Hardcover: ISBN 160690003X

Just a Pilgrim is a five-issue comic book limited series written by Garth Ennis, with art by Carlos Ezquerra, and published by Black Bull, the short-lived comics publishing division of Wizard Entertainment, in 2001. It was followed by a 4 issue sequel entitled Just a Pilgrim: Garden of Eden in 2002.

== Publication history ==
The series came about as Preacher was coming to a close, and according to Ennis he "wanted to push the idea of the classic Western or action anti-villain a little bit more than I normally would, and that is where the religious fanaticism came from and also where the cannibalism came from."

== Setting ==
The setting of the series is one in which the Sun experienced coronal expansion (referred to as 'The Burn') growing to the point where the Earth was scorched and the oceans evaporated, and only a few pockets of humanity have survived. The first series is narrated by Billy Shepard, a child who is with a refugee group attempting to cross the now empty Atlantic Basin, in hopes of finding sources of water on the other side.

== Plot ==
=== Just a Pilgrim ===
The title character (never named, simply called Pilgrim) was a Green Beret prior to the burn. During one mission, he and his comrades were left adrift at sea in a lifeboat, and forced to resort to cannibalism to survive, with Pilgrim being the only survivor by the time help arrived. He was exonerated, but he had developed a taste for human flesh, and continued the practice after he escaped. He was eventually caught by the authorities. During his imprisonment, he was routinely visited by a priest, and eventually accepted God. When the burn happened, he was freed, though he was the only survivor in sight. Struck by the death of the holy man who tried to lead him to redemption, he took the preacher's cross and burned his faith into himself (the scar on his face).

The series begins some years later, when Pilgrim encounters the group of refugees and offers to show them the way. He helps defend them from a group of pirates who attack them during their trek. The Pirates are led by a man with no eyes, two hooks for hands and two peg legs. Pilgrim befriends Billy Shepard, a young boy who keeps a diary and sticks up for him. Most of the refugees do not trust Pilgrim, as their numbers keep dwindling and, according to a few, his stories do not make sense. Eventually, Pilgrim leads them in a climactic battle, revealing that he had knowingly used the refugees as bait to lure the pirates into a trap, justifying his actions by the fact that their deaths will make the area safe for other travellers. As Pilgrim expects, the battle annihilates both the refugees and the pirates, leaving him the only survivor.

=== Just a Pilgrim: Garden of Eden ===
In the sequel, Garden of Eden, Pilgrim comes across an oasis of sorts in a deep oceanic trench, where there is still abundant water, plant life, and what may be the last remnants of a civilised humanity. The people are mainly scientists who have been building a space shuttle that is near completion which may be able to take them off planet to some more hospitable world. Pilgrim requests that they take the Bible with them when they leave. The group is threatened by the onslaught of sliders, mutated jellyfish which can possess the bodies of other organisms. Pilgrim assists the scientists in warding them off. Eventually, the sliders gain an upper hand, and raid the sanctuary killing almost everyone. The shuttle is launched at the last minute, with only two survivors among the scientists (a male and a female), on board. Defending their escape, with an enemy's fingers literally in his eye, Pilgrim changes his mind and tells the woman to throw away the Bible, having had lost faith due to the deaths of so many innocent people. Pilgrim manages to ensure that the journal of Billy Shepard is taken instead.

The shuttle launches, the two survivors are safe with their genetic samples and the fate of Pilgrim is unknown.

== Collected editions ==
The series have been collected in trade paperbacks that have been reprinted by Titan Books:

- Just a Pilgrim (by Garth Ennis and Carlos Ezquerra):
  - Just a Pilgrim (Black Bull, 5-issue mini-series, 2001, tpb, Titan Books, 2001, ISBN 1-84023-377-X)
  - Just a Pilgrim: Garden of Eden (Black Bull, 4-issue mini-series, 2002, tpb, Titan Books, 2003 ISBN 1-84023-590-X)

Dynamite Entertainment will be releasing a single hardcover collection of both limited series (ISBN 160690003X).

== See also ==
- Space Western
