= Bob, the Galactic Bum =

Comics miniseries (1995)

Bob, the Galactic Bum is a four-issue comic miniseries published by DC Comics in 1995. Written by Alan Grant and John Wagner and illustrated by Carlos Ezquerra, it is a science fiction comedy about a vagrant called Bob, featuring Lobo as a guest star.

== Premise ==
Bob is a homeless con man travelling the galaxy with his hapless sidekick whom he routinely mistreats. When stumbling upon a lost prince, Bob attempts to take advantage of the situation while guiding the man home. Unfortunately, several hostile forces are also after the royal person.

== Reprint ==
The series was reprinted (in black and white) over eight issues of the Judge Dredd Megazine in 2008 (issues 266–273). While the copyright for the story and the character Bob is owned by the series' creators, copyright for Lobo is owned by DC, and so in the reprint Lobo was replaced by a large butch lesbian called Asbo.
