= Shout (magazine) =

Magazine for teenage girls in the United Kingdom

- Editor: Maria T. Welch
- Categories: Teen Lifestyle for Girls
- Frequency: fortnightly on Thursday
- Circulation: 82,983 (2006)
- Publisher: D. C. Thomson & Co. Ltd
- Founded: 1993; 33 years ago
- Country: United Kingdom
- Based in: Dundee, Scotland
- Language: English
- Website: shoutmag.co.uk

Shout was a UK magazine for teenage girls, published by D. C. Thomson & Co. Ltd of Dundee, Scotland, The magazine was first published with the issue dated 5 March 1993.

It carried articles on fashion, celebrities, flowcharts, true stories, problems and embarrassing moments. It was printed fortnightly, normally at £2.99, and was read by over 520,000 people each fortnight. Their slogan is "No.1 for YouTubers!, the ONLY teen mag YOU need!"

== Categories ==
The categories included a wide range of articles. The celebrity pages may have a topic (such as celebs who pick their noses, etc.) or can be just be embarrassing or enhancing pictures. Fashion shows clothes available at various stores and different ways to wear them and different ranges of colours and ways to apply make up to enhance one's features. Flow charts and polls let readers express their opinion and see what other people think on a topic. True stories contain stories of people's experiences, problems or ailments. "Problems" is a write-back system which allows girls to send in their problems which may appear in the magazine or receive a written reply. "Embarrassing moments" is a feature on readers' recent embarrassing moments. They are rated on how embarrassing they are: if the editors say "Get over it", then it is deemed barely embarrassing; "Slightly shameful" means it was embarrassing at the time but the reader should eventually get over it, and "Completely cringey!" means she will never live it down. The magazine also features advice columns from YouTubers Zoella and Sprinkle of Glitter.

== History ==
Shout was launched by Jackie Brown and is currently edited by Maria T. Welch. It was aimed at girls aged 11–14.

From 2015, the magazine shifted its focus more on YouTubers than pop stars and bands.

On 9 February 2023 it was announced that Shout would be ceasing publication.

== Shout Secrets ==
Another magazine, named Shout Secrets, was released in October 2008, after a survey which showed that readers wanted more true stories and celeb gossip. It featured more of these and fewer of the flowcharts, style, fashion and quizzes. On a trial run the magazine had good reviews. It costed £3.00.

== See also ==
- List of magazines published in Scotland
