= War Stories (comics) =

American comic book series

- Cover of War Stories Volume 1 trade paperback

Publication information
- Publisher: Vertigo (series 1 & 2); Avatar (series 3, 4, 5 & 6)
- Format: Mini-series
- Genre: War
- Publication date: 2001 - 2017
- No. of issues: 16

Creative team
- Written by: Garth Ennis
- Artist: Various

Collected editions
- Volume 1: ISBN 1-84023-912-3
- Volume 2: ISBN 1-4012-1039-2
- Volume 3: ISBN 1-59291-272-9
- Volume 4: ISBN 1-59291-277-X
- Volume 5: ISBN 1-59291-286-9

War Stories is a comic book series written by Garth Ennis and illustrated by a number of artists.

== Overview ==
The first two series, originally under the title War Story and published by Vertigo, consisted of two four-issue mini-series. The two series were printed monthly, the first beginning in November 2001 and the second beginning in January 2003.

A third series, now titled War Stories, published by Avatar Press, commenced in October 2014 and ran for three issues. A fourth series began publication in June 2015. A fifth series commenced in 2016. The first issue of the sixth series was released in May 2017.

Each mini-series consisted of three or four stand-alone issues. Most of the stories were set during World War II. One exception was set during the Spanish Civil War and another in the Middle-East in 1973. Each deals with the horror of war experienced by those on the frontline.

== Series 1 by Vertigo ==
=== Johann's Tiger ===
In the final days of World War II the commander of a Tiger tank tries to save his men by convincing them to desert so they may surrender to the Americans before they are killed fighting the Soviets.

With pencils by Chris Weston and inks by Gary Erskine.

=== D-Day Dodgers ===
A young British officer is assigned to the Italian campaign. Once there he finds that their sacrifices are being ignored at home in favour of news about the battle in France and a massive, possibly suicidal, push is planned to attract headlines.

With art by John Higgins.

=== Screaming Eagles ===
In the last days of the war four American soldiers, all that remains of their company, are sent to secure a mansion to be used as a General's headquarters. Once there they find Nazis have been storing a fortune in stolen artworks, antiques and valuables. The men decide to enjoy themselves for a few days before they have to return to the front.

With art by Dave Gibbons.

=== Nightingale ===
Narrated by her executive officer, HMS Nightingale is a destroyer assigned to escort convoys on the Murmansk Run. When they are given foolish orders that lead to ships under their care being lost, she gets a reputation as cursed. Her crew are forced to make the ultimate sacrifice to set things right.

With art by David Lloyd.

When asked at Wizard World, Philadelphia, what comic Ennis was the most proud of, his response was this issue, saying: "If I had to hold up one thing and say this is what I can do, that would be it".

== Series 2 by Vertigo ==
=== The Reivers ===
A story of the SAS in North Africa. Conflict begins between the groups Commanding Officer and his second in command when it seems the former is more interested in satisfying his lust for blood and glory than fighting a war.

With art by Cam Kennedy.

=== J for Jenny ===
A British pilot hopes to take revenge on the Germans who killed his family by bombing civilian targets but his co-pilot is more of a pacifist who sees their missions as a necessary evil. Their conflict leads to brawling and eventually threatens to destroy the crew when they're shot down over Germany.

With art by David Lloyd.

=== Condors ===
Set towards the end of the Spanish Civil War, four soldiers from different sides and different countries seek shelter in a shell hole during a battle. Unarmed, they each tell their stories for entering the war to pass the time.

With art by Carlos Ezquerra.

=== Archangel ===
An RAF pilot is assigned to a Cam Ship as part of a string of unfortunate luck. But his experiences make him realize he shouldn't put off living his life just because he might die at any moment.

With art by Gary Erskine.

== Series 3 by Avatar Press ==
=== Castles in the Sky ===
A B-17 crew of the US 8th Air-Force experience the horrors of the aerial battles of the Allied daylight bombing offensive over Germany & Occupied Europe 1943–1944.

With art by Matt Martin and Keith Burns.

=== Children of Israel ===
In 1973, at the height of the Battle of the Golan Heights, an Israeli tank crew find themselves up against the might of the Syrian army.

With art by Tomas Aira.

=== The Last German Winter ===
In February 1945, a German mother and her children join the hordes of refugees fleeing across Eastern Germany from the advancing Soviets. A group of German soldiers appear to offer hope of salvation but these men may turn out to be as dangerous as the approaching enemy.

With art by Tomas Aira.

== Series 4 by Avatar Press ==
=== Our Wild Geese Go ===
A unit of Irish volunteers, disregarding their own country's neutrality, join the Allied advance into Germany during the closing days of the Second World War only to beset by bitter divisions amongst themselves arising from Ireland's troubled recent past.

With art by Tomas Aira.

=== Tokyo Club ===
US P-51 pilots fly dangerously long-range escort missions for bombers attacking the Japanese homeland in 1945.

With art by Tomas Aira.

== Series 5 by Avatar Press ==
=== Send a Gunboat ===
A Royal Navy Gunboat patrolling the English Channel finds itself being stalked by a German E-Boat commanded by a skipper nicknamed 'Hans the Bastard'.

With art by Tomas Aira.

=== Vampire Squadron ===
A motley and unwieldy band of foreign pilots are collected into one Royal Air Force Squadron. The pilots, including Czechs, Poles, Australians & Canadians, have been rejected from other units as being too ill-disciplined or unsuitable. Yet, in the winter of 1940, they have been assigned the task of flying Boulton-Paul Defiant night-fighters in the nocturnal defense of the British Isles.

With art by Tomas Aira.

== Series 6 by Avatar Press ==
=== Flower of My Heart ===
A British RAF pilot Robin Whittaker meets an Italian pilot & POW Captain Antonio Valenzano during the Allied advance through Tunisia in the spring of 1943.

With art by Tomas Aira.

== Collected editions ==
The first two series were collected as trade paperbacks:

- War Stories (Vertigo, two 4-issue mini-series, each story is a standalone):
  - Volume 1 (2004 ISBN 1-84023-912-3)
  - Volume 2 (2006 ISBN 1-4012-1039-2)

Series 3 (published by Avatar Press) was collected as a trade paperback in January 2016. Series 4 was collected as a TPB in June 2016. Series 5 was collected as a TPB on January 8, 2019 - it is a 4 part story of "The Flower of My Heart" and is the final TPB issue of the epic War Stories series by Avatar Press.

- War Stories (Avatar Press, three 2-issue or 3-issue mini-series, each story is a standalone):
  - Volume 3 (2016 ISBN 1-59291-272-9)
  - Volume 4 (2016 ISBN 1-59291-277-X)
  - Volume 5 (2017 ISBN 1-59291-286-9) - January 8, 2019.

== See also ==
- Battlefields, another war comic book series by Ennis
