= The Scots Magazine =

Scottish periodical (1739–1826)

- Categories: Scottish magazines
- Frequency: Monthly
- First issue: 1739
- Company: DC Thomson
- Country: Scotland
- Website: scotsmagazine.com
- ISSN: 0048-9751

The Scots Magazine is a magazine containing articles on subjects of Scottish interest. It claims to be the oldest magazine in the world still in publication, although there have been several gaps in its publication history. It has reported on events from the defeat of the Jacobites through the Napoleonic Wars to the Second World War and on to the creation of the new Scottish Parliament.

== History ==
The Scots Magazine was originally published in January 1739. It was intended as a rival to the London-based Gentleman's Magazine, in order that "our countrymen might have the production of every month sooner, cheaper and better collected than before". Its first issue, dated Monday 9 February 1739, cost 6d. and appeared in a blue cover with the motto Ne quid falsi dicere audeat, ne quid veri non audeat. Popular through the 18th century, it innovated a register of births, marriages and deaths, which other journals soon copied. From 1759 until 1765 it was edited by William Smellie.

In 1801 Archibald Constable bought the magazine, and three years later amalgamated it with the Edinburgh Magazine and Literary Miscellany. Its popularity, however, was eroded by competition with serious literary journals such as the Edinburgh Review and Blackwood's Magazine. By 1826 sales had declined to such a point that it was withdrawn. Attempts to revive the name as the New Scots Magazine in 1828 and the Scots Weekly Magazine in 1832 were unsuccessful.

In December 1887 publication resumed as a partial successor to The Scottish Church under a new owner (S. Cowan, Perth) and continued until 1893 when once again it was withdrawn. It was published between 1922 and 1924 as The Scottish Church. In 1924 publication as The Scots Magazine resumed, this time by the St Andrew's Society (Glasgow). In 1927 D. C. Thomson & Co. Ltd took over and have continued to publish it ever since.

With a monthly average readership of over 178,000, The Scots Magazine is the world's best-selling Scottish-interest publication, containing articles on culture, history, nature, etc., and is targeted at Scots at home and abroad. In 2013, the magazine moved to a B5 format.
