= Battlefields (comics) =

Comic book metaseries written by Garth Ennis

- Cover of The Complete Battlefields Volume 1.
- Created by: Garth Ennis

Publication information
- Publisher: Dynamite Entertainment
- Schedule: Monthly
- Formats: Original material for the series has been published as a set of limited series.
- Original language: English
- Genre: War
- Publication date: November 2008 – present

Creative team
- Writer(s): Garth Ennis
- Artist(s): various
- Colorist(s): Tony Avina; Rob Steen

Reprints
- Collected editions
- The Complete Battlefields Volume 1: ISBN 1-60690-079-X
- Night Witches: ISBN 1606900285
- Dear Billy: ISBN 1606900757
- Tankies: ISBN 1606900579

Battlefields is a comic book metaseries written by Garth Ennis, comprising several mini-series, each illustrated by a different artist and published by American publisher Dynamite Entertainment.

== Publication history ==
The series was announced at the 2008 Philadelphia Wizardworld.

The series is divided into self-contained mini-series of three issues, all of which are set during World War II. The first volume in turn consisted of three mini-series. The first mini-series, with artist Russell Braun, titled The Night Witches is set on the Eastern front and concerns a women-only Soviet bomber regiment. The second series, with artist Peter Snejbjerg, titled Dear Billy concerns a British nurse, who had survived rape and attempted execution by Japanese soldiers in Singapore, and her relationship with a decorated flying ace. The third series was Tankies with artist Carlos Ezquerra. It concerns an inexperienced British tank crew of Londoners in a Churchill Tank led by a Geordie veteran sergeant as they attempt to catch up with their company, enduring attacks by Nazi Tiger tanks as the Battle of Normandy rages on.

Starting in 2010, Ennis began the work on the second volume. He used a similar format, with two storylines, The Firefly and His Majesty and Motherland being sequels to Tankies and Night Witches respectively. The other, Happy Valley, was also the first of these to be published, with art by P. J. Holden. Happy Valley deals with a novice pilot assigned to an Australian bomber crew bombing German targets while hoping to stay alive for the three missions remaining until they return home. Firefly follows the same British tank crew as they try to take down a powerful German tank. In Motherland, the star pilot of the Witches gets transferred into a squadron of fighters defending the Russian front and must learn to once again work well with others.

In 2012, Dynamite returned to the series, with a sequel to "The Tankies" and "The Firefly and His Majesty", titled "The Green Fields Beyond", and set during the Korean War. This micro-series began publication in November 2012.

In February 2013, another series, The Fall and Rise of Anna Kharkova, was published. As the third and final installment of the storyline that began with Night Witches and Motherland, this volume covers Anna's experiences from her post-war imprisonment in a Siberian labour camp and her exploits as a jet pilot in the Cold War.

== Collected editions ==
The individual series have been collected into individual trade paperbacks and then each run of three has then been collected into a single hardcover volume:

- The Complete Battlefields:
  - Volume 1 (hardcover, 268 pages, December 2009, ISBN 1-60690-079-X) collects:
    - Night Witches (tpb, 96 pages, March 2009, ISBN 1-60690-028-5)
    - Dear Billy (tpb, 88 pages, November 2009, ISBN 1-60690-075-7)
    - Tankies (tpb, 88 pages, September 2009, ISBN 1-60690-057-9)
  - Volume 2 (hardcover, 200 pages, July 2011, ISBN 1-60690-222-9) collects:
    - Happy Valley (tpb, 88 pages, June 2010, ISBN 1-60690-128-1)
    - The Firefly and His Majesty (tpb, 80 pages, August 2010, ISBN 1-60690-145-1)
    - Motherland (tpb, 80 pages, February 2011, ISBN 1-60690-221-0)
  - Volume 3 (hardcover, 144 pages, May 2014, ISBN 1-60690-474-4)
    - The Green Fields Beyond (tpb, 80 pages, August 2013, ISBN 1-60690-416-7)
    - The Fall & Rise of Anna Kharkova (tpb, 80 pages, December 2013, ISBN 1-60690-426-4)

== See also ==
- War Stories, another war comic book series by Ennis
- Adventures in the Rifle Brigade, a WWII war comic book series by Ennis and Ezquerra
