= My Weekly =

British women's magazine

- Categories: Woman's magazine
- Frequency: Weekly
- Total circulation: 112,392 (June 2013)
- Founded: 1910
- Company: D. C. Thomson & Co.
- Country: United Kingdom
- Based in: Dundee, Scotland
- Language: English
- Website: www.myweekly.co.uk

My Weekly is a magazine for women. Published by D. C. Thomson & Co. Ltd of Dundee, Scotland. It tends to consist of short stories, reader contributions, knitting or sewing patterns, and celebrity gossip. There are no real life horror stories.

The publication originated as a newspaper. It was purchased by the Thomson brothers early in the twentieth century, and was relaunched as a magazine in 1910.

Thomson also publishes a similarly named collection of stories titled My Weekly Story Collection, and an annual at the end of the year titled The Best of My Weekly.

== See also ==
- List of magazines published in Scotland
