= Spike (DC Thomson) =

British comics anthology

Spike was a British comics anthology that ran from 22 January 1983 to 28 April 1984. Published by D. C. Thomson & Co. Ltd, it was a traditional 'action comic for boys', with many of its strips revolving around football, athletics, school, war, sci-fi, espionage and mystery. After just 67 issues it merged with Champ comic in May 1984.

== Strips published in the comic ==
- The Spike Report concerning the adventures of Spike, a rebellious teenager, with a hatred of authority. Drawn by artist Brian Walker.
- Iron Barr, about an incredibly talented working class amateur goalkeeper, and scrap-metal merchant, named Charlie Barr, (similar in concept to Tough of the Track).
- The Man In Black, a story revolving around the fictional legendary British athlete, William Wilson.
- The Bleak Street Bunch, a Grange Hill school-style serial dealing with contemporary issues in the fictional town of Slagley.
- Ticker Tait, an espionage story about a British secret agent with a bomb implanted in his heart.
- Midshipman Coward, a tale about a sailor boy.
- The Taming Of Johnny Tough, a story about a teenage boy who is trained (by unorthodox methods) to be a top British footballer.
- Starhawk, a science fiction serial, featuring the continuing adventures of Sol Rynn and Droid, set in the 26th century. (Continued from Buddy comic.)
- Krazy Kops, a comedy comic strip about incompetent police officers, which had originally appeared in Sparky under the name L Cars.
