= Joe Bones the Human Fly =

World War II comic strip

Joe Bones the Human Fly was a World War II comic strip published in the British post-war boys' weekly The Victor. The artists of this strip have remained anonymous.

== Concept ==
Joe Bones was a young soldier in the British Army during the Second World War. He was a talented climber, and was sent on commando missions by Government agent Lord Plimpton (referred to by Joe as "The Guv") that involved climbing 'unclimbable' obstacles – hence his nickname, the Human Fly.
