= Barry Forshaw =

British writer, broadcaster and journalist

Barry Forshaw is a writer, broadcaster and journalist. His books include British Crime Writing: An Encyclopedia, The Rough Guide to Crime Fiction, Brit Noir, British Gothic Cinema, Nordic Noir, Sex and Film, Euro Noir, Death in a Cold Climate: Scandinavian Crime Fiction and BFI Classics: War of the Worlds along with books on Italian cinema, film noir and the first UK biography of Stieg Larsson, The Man Who Left Too Soon. He has written on books and films for many newspapers and magazines; he also edits Crime Time, and is one of the talking heads for the ITV Crime Thriller author profiles. He records documentaries on crime fiction and film for a variety of BBC producers for both TV and radio, along with much work for foreign broadcasters. He has been vice chair of the Crime Writers' Association. As well as his specialist area of books (in most genres), he writes on film (booklets for special edition DVDs) and all aspects of the arts (popular and serious). He is the winner of the Keating Award for Non-Fiction for British Crime Writing: An Encyclopedia (Greenwood)

In a previous career, he was an illustrator, working for Bullet, Natural History Museum and Jackie.

== Works ==
- Crime Fiction: A Reader's Guide (Oldcastle/No Exit)
- British Gothic Cinema (Palgrave Macmillan)
- Brit Noir (No Exit)
- Italian Cinema: Arthouse to Exploitation (Kamera)
- Euro Noir (No Exit)
- Sex and Film (Palgrave Macmillan)
- Nordic Noir (No Exit Press)
- Death in a Cold Climate: Scandinavian Crime Fiction (Palgrave Macmillan)
- BFI Classics: War of the Worlds
- British Crime Writing: An Encyclopedia (Greenwood)
- Historical Noir (No Exit)
- Crime Time (No Exit)
