= Scotcampus =

Scottish student magazine

- Type: Monthly newspaper
- Format: Magazine
- Owner: Scotcampus
- Editor: Laura Blackhurst
- Founded: 2001
- Political alignment: None
- Headquarters: Glasgow

Scotcampus was an independent student magazine in Scotland. The paper was put together using a combination of freelance journalists and student writers from across Scotland. It was distributed throughout various locations in all of Scotland's major towns and cities. The last issue was in 2016.

== Background ==
Scotcampus was founded by Graeme Barratt and Anna Purdie, who launched it in 2001. The magazine operated as a lifestyle publication, using approachable and inspiring journalism to reach student readers across all campuses in Scotland. In October 2012 Jennifer Lynn was named as the editor of Scotcampus. The magazine is published on a bimonthly basis.

Since its founding, Scotcampus interviewed numerous high-profile musicians, politicians, actors, directors, and people of interest. Some of the most notable included: The Prodigy, Dizzee Rascal, Alex Salmond, Michelle Mone, Alastair Campbell, Armando Iannucci, Howard Marks, and Sir Tom Hunter.

== Freshers' Festival ==
Since 2007, Scotcampus hosted a Student Freshers' Festival that was open to all university and college students aged 16 and over, and took place in Glasgow annually. The Freshers' Festival attracted more than 10,000 students and young people from across Scotland by offering up a selection of bands, DJ's, free gifts and contact with local organisations, job opportunities and internships. Some of the onstage performances at previous festivals included fashion shows, dancers, rap battles, cheerleaders, and yoga classes. Food exhibitors offered the students discounts and even free food and drinks. Previous exhibitors at the Festival have been wide-ranging and have included Urban Outfitters, Royal Air Force, Domino's Pizza, Ernst & Young, Papa John's and YO! Sushi. In 2010, the Freshers' Festivals expanded into Edinburgh. Both events were powered with renewable energy.
