= Alf Tupper =

British comic strip character

Alf Tupper

Alf Tupper is the protagonist of a British comic strip, The Tough of the Track (or Alf Tupper: The Tough of the Track), created by Bill Blaine (probably a pseudonym for William Blaine, head of DC Thomson comics), written by Gilbert Lawford Dalton. He is a working class, "hard as nails" runner, whose adventures appeared in The Rover from 1949 and then The Victor British boys' comics from D. C. Thomson & Co. Ltd. (Some of the comic strips in The Victor were visualisations of the stories that had appeared in The Rover.) His adventures appeared over almost a 40-year period, until 1992. Many artists have written and drawn his stories, including Pete Sutherland, during his run in The Victor.

In April 2014, Alf Tupper returned in a monthly one-page comic-strip feature in the international athletics magazine Athletics Weekly.

== Alf Tupper's storyline and character ==
Whatever his job and wherever it was located, Alf was the eternal underdog. Regarded as a "guttersnipe" by the posh blokes from the Amateur Athletic Association, he was at his best the day after a night on late shift, lifting heavy objects and getting little sleep. His journey to the track (often White City) almost invariably involved falling asleep on the train and missing his stop.

Sometimes his tardiness was caused by skullduggery of the worst kind by "stuck-up" rich boys from a university somewhere, but usually it was because he could not stop himself from rescuing people in distress or just generally being a selfless chap. Regardless of this, he always got there in the nick of time and, having just finished his fish and chips, went on to win the championships or even, in "end of series" stories, break the world record for the mile and utter his famous catchphrase "I run 'em all!”

Vic Whittle writes:

Alf Tupper was 18 years of age when he first appeared in Rover in 1949 and he continued his adventures in Victor in the early 1960s. He lived with his Aunt Meg in Anchor Alley, Greystone. The house had one room upstairs and one room downstairs; Alf's bed was a mattress on the kitchen floor. He was employed as a welder working in Ike Smith's welding shop which was located under a railway arch. His wages were £1 5s (£1.25p) per week of which he paid his Aunt £1.2s.6d (£1.12½p) for rent. This meant he had 2/6d (12½p) for himself. Following a bust up with his Aunt Meg, he moved into Ike Smith's welding shop, sleeping on a mattress by his workbench. Alf joined the Greystone Harriers paying a subscription fee of half a guinea; he was only a member of the Harriers for three weeks and was instructed to return his membership card by Bob Richards the Honorary Secretary, following an ontrack fight with Vic Mason in the 440 yards at the Greystone Harriers Sports meeting. Alf's staple diet was fish and chips wrapped in newspaper.

== Appearances ==
The 1950s version of Alf was variously a millwright at Greystone Aviation Factory (The Rover – No. 1303) or a plumber in the employ of Charlie Chipping of Gas Street, Graystone (The Rover – No. 1338).

The 1968 version of Alf (in The Victor Book for Boys) is a self-employed welder – "Welding done here" – and is still located under the railway arches in fictional Greystone, a drab town with cobbled streets, where heavy industry employs thousands of manual workers.

By the 1970s, some of the early 1950s storylines were being re-introduced to a new generation. There was even a 'prequel' series about Alf's "rough tough boyhood" and his struggle with the authorities as an orphan (began in The Victor 0626 dated 17 February 1973).

Alf's last published appearance came in the Scottish newspaper, The Sunday Post, in 1992, and featured Alf in training for the Barcelona Olympic games.

== In popular culture ==
UK punk rock band The Boys referred to their producer as "Alf Tupper", as a tribute to their hero. They used the name on records and in adverts in the music press as a top producer who could do anything.
