= Harpies and Quines =

Scottish feminist magazine

Harpies & Quines
- Founded: 1992
- Final issue: 1994
- Based in: Glasgow
- ISSN: 0966-2995
- OCLC: 29800762

Harpies and Quines was a feminist magazine founded by seven women living and working in Scotland including the journalist and broadcaster Lesley Riddoch and published in Scotland between 1992 and 1994. The founder women were two community workers, two journalists, an illustrator, a film editor and a graphic artist, a film and television art director. It was launched on a wave of enthusiasm, goodwill, donations and unpaid efforts of a great number of women.

It was unsuccessfully sued by Harpers and Queen, who objected to the magazine's name. Harpers and Queen managed to give the small independent magazine the kind of front-page UK-wide publicity it could not have afforded to pay for. Several sets of circumstances led to the directors of Harpies and Quines declaring voluntary insolvency in 1994 after publishing 16 (18?) issues.

For the 25th anniversary of the last issue, Harpies and Quines published a one-off special edition.
