= Bullet (DC Thomson) =

British comic published during the 1970s

- The 2nd issue of Bullet included a free gift - a survival guide.

Publication information
- Publisher: D. C. Thomson & Co. Ltd
- Schedule: Weekly
- Format: Ongoing series
- Publication date: 1976 – 1978 (merged with Warlord)
- No. of issues: 147
- Main character: Fireball

Bullet was a comic book published weekly in the UK during the 1970s.

First published on 14 February 1976 by D.C. Thomson for 7p, it focused upon adventure, action, revenge, science fiction, war and sport. It was a popular comic for boys throughout its publication.

The main character was a moustached, multi-talented, highly trained secret agent, aptly named Fireball. When his parents had died in a mysterious car crash when he was a young child, he became the ward of his father's friend Lord Peter Flint, a wartime hero (a.k.a. Warlord). Fireball had been trained by "Uncle Pete" (since childhood) in the arts of shooting, martial arts, sports and survival - this was as well as the usual reading and writing skills. The full Fireball story was secret but could be acquired by joining the "Fireball club" which gave you the story enclosed in a red, plastic wallet. This story was used as the key for a substitution cipher for encrypting/decrypting secret messages which often appeared in Bullet's central pages as a sequence of seemingly random numbers. You also received a Fireball pendant for joining. Fireball's original pendant (which he always wore) saved his life on one occasion - it shielded him from a long range sniper's bullet. Fireball's archenemy was Catriona Klansberg (a.k.a. "The Cat"). Fireball had a soft spot for her - he had a habit of letting her slip away after he had just thwarted her evil plan. She always appeared in the final panel of every strip to give a taster of the following week's adventure.

In December 1978 the comic merged into the longer running Warlord comic. In December 2021, it was reported that a Fireball animated series was under discussion.

== Notable stories ==
Fireball: Bullet always included weekly stories about Fireball getting into various scrapes, going on dangerous missions, saving the world and defeating criminals - he was always able to maintain a sense of humour throughout the most death-defying situations.

Some of the other stories included:

- Twisty: Twisty Lunnon was a fantastic footballer, with an attitude, who also raced pigeons in his spare time and sometimes had brushes with the law. He started off playing as an apprentice with 4th division Sleethorpe United. He had a crooked left foot (caused by a car crash) which allowed him to bend the ball with astonishing accuracy. Drawn by artist Tony Harding.
- Smasher: a 50-foot-tall (15 m), virtually indestructible robot which destroyed cities. It was controlled from a secret command bubble by Doctor Doom (not to be confused with Dr. Victor von Doom in Marvel Comics), an evil genius who planned to take over the world. Bullet ran several series for this story - they had to nuke it at the end.
- Wonder Mann: H.E. Mann had been raised by computers to become a world beating sportsman. A small radio/T.V "eye" linked Mann to Professor Wilkie and his assistant Tom Brace who were able to give remote assistance. He was seemingly unbeatable at every sport.
- Midge: Sixteen-year-old "Midge" Miller worked for Callaghan's the builders who were erecting a prefabricated shed at Marrow's shipyard. Midge started off as a 7 stone weakling and was bullied by his macho co-workers. However, in his spare time he took up a bodybuilding course at the S.W.I.S.H., the Shipyard Workers Indoor Sports Hall and at the end of the story became a hunk to be reckoned with.
- Three Men in a Jeep: A 2nd world war story set in Northern France during 1944. Three men escaped from a military prison and started fighting their own war. They stole a Jeep and then went around killing huns, blowing things up and causing mayhem.
- Vic's Vengeance: Vic Mason swore to avenge his father, killed opposing the Dean brothers, leaders of a vicious gang terrorising the East End of London. Patch Burns, a scrap dealer and ex-policeman (with an eye patch) became Vic's ally - he mentored him, helped train him and gave survival tips.
- A Tale of Terror from Solomon Knight: A different scary story every week. Solomon Knight would introduce the story and then tell us what the story was all about at the end of it, sometimes leaving certain disturbing aspects open to the reader's imagination. Narrator Knight was presented as a friend of Fireball; the stories were often drawn by Barry Forshaw.
- Werewolf: When ex-detective Dave Barry inherits an old house, he gains the power to change into a werewolf whenever the moon shines. Using this power, he fights an endless war against crime.
- Ginger: Tim Brady was a fugitive on the run from his bullying stepfather who had attempted to drown Ginger, his oddly-coloured greyhound. Tim saved the dog's life and the once weakly pup developed into a potential champion. Several unsavoury people (including the stepfather himself) realised Ginger's worth and attempted to get him from Tim using unscrupulous means.
- Strike Force 2000: Fighting a constant war against a Revolutionary Organisation of Anarchy and Terror (R.O.A.T) are the three men of Strike Force 2000. They flew through the sky using jet propulsion systems strapped to their backs, carried machine guns and had a radio/TV "eye" link with a secret computer base.

== Other Items ==
- Fireball Calling: The comic always had a two-page spread entitled Fireball Calling - it contained readers' letters (often followed by a reply from Fireball), trivia, the encrypted passwords/messages and competitions. Readers would get a fireball T-shirt for getting a letter printed. The writer of the week's best letter would receive an electronic pocket calculator - a much-coveted item in the period of the comics run.
- Sports profiles: Often there would be a footballers' fact file and/or information about veteran or sports cars, etc.
- Fireball Club: There was a Fireball club that readers could join, in return for a small sum they would get a red plastic wallet containing a copy of Fireball's secret biography (which served as a key for decoding messages in the comic), an i.d. card and a Fireball Flaming 'F' pendant.

Flaming F Fireball logo
