= Adventures in the Rifle Brigade =

2000 comic book limited series

- Cover to issue #1 of Adventures in the Rifle Brigade (October 2000), art by Brian Bolland.

Publication information
- Publisher: Vertigo Comics
- Schedule: Monthly
- Format: Limited series
- Genre: War
- Publication date: Adventures in the Rifle Brigade: October 2000 – December 2000; Operation: Bollock: October 2001 – January 2002
- No. of issues: 3 each
- Main character: The Rifle Brigade

Creative team
- Created by: Garth Ennis; Carlos Ezquerra
- Written by: Garth Ennis
- Artist: Carlos Ezquerra
- Letterer: Clem Robins
- Colorist(s): Patricia Mulvihill; Allen Jamison; Operation Bollock: Kevin Somers
- Editor(s): Axel Alonso; Jennifer Lee; Operation Bollock: Tony Bedard; Tammy Beatty

Collected editions
- Adventures in the Rifle Brigade: ISBN 978-1401203535

Adventures in the Rifle Brigade is the name of two Vertigo comic book limited series created by writer Garth Ennis and artist Carlos Ezquerra. The first series, Adventures in the Rifle Brigade, was released in 2000. Its sequel, Adventures in the Rifle Brigade: Operation: Bollock, was released in 2001 and 2002.

== Plot ==
The Rifle Brigade is a British special forces commando unit commanded by Captain Darcy and staffed with a variety of oddball and at times deviant soldiers from varied British cities and allied nations. The two stories concerns their various covert missions across Europe and Africa and their relevance to the Allied victory.

"Operation: Bollock" in particular focused on the team's diplomatic and action-packed attempts to gain for themselves the missing testicle of Adolf Hitler. It is being held in the small Arabic country of Semmen and is being pursued by many forces, German, American and British, none of which the Brigade can trust.

The American forces are represented by Maryland Smith, a whip-wielding adventurer with the unwanted nickname of 'Mary'.

== Character list ==
=== The Rifle Brigade ===
- Captain Hugo 'Khyber' Darcy: The Unit's leader, a British aristocrat and combat-hungry officer. Some of his past exploits include calling Rommel a "big nosed cunt" to his face. He is characterized by a large moustache.
- Second Lieutenant Cecil 'Doubtful' Milk: Darcy's second in command, a highly accomplished marksman, hand-to-hand combatant and pilot, he is a survivor of many incidents in which his side was massacred and is implied to be homosexual. A running gag has the unit surviving a very lethal incident, to find Milk wounded, upon which he submits an escalating series of requests for sexual favors (from Captain Darcy) on him, "like nanny used to do", only to be immediately revealed as faking his injuries.
- Sergeant Crumb: Allegedly the largest man in the British armed forces, a man so frightening that his parents emigrated upon his birth, he was institutionalized at the age of one, and later ate his uncle. He only speaks on occasion, and only ever says "Ey-Oop".
- Corporal Geezer: A "cut-throat thug" tried for 413 counts of murder, his sentence waived upon posting to the Rifle Brigade. He only speaks on occasion, and only ever says "Yer aht of ordeah".
- Hank the Yank: The Unit's demolitionist, he is a loud American soldier who volunteered before the United States entered the war. Hank is characterized by constantly having a cigar in his mouth, echoing others fictional American World War II GIs such as Nick Fury. He only speaks on occasion, and only ever says "Gawd Dammit".
- The Piper: A walking Scottish caricature, he is very old, as he is said to have served the Darcy family for five wars. The Piper carries a bagpipe into battle, made from human remains. His playing of said bagpipe has the effect of invigorating the members of the Rifle Brigade, while being extremely traumatic for anyone else. Several enemies have killed themselves upon hearing it.

== Collected editions ==
- Adventures in the Rifle Brigade (by Garth Ennis and Carlos Ezquerra, tpb collects both miniseries, 2004: ISBN 1-4012-0353-1):
  - Adventures in the Rifle Brigade (Vertigo, 3-issue mini-series, 2000)
  - Adventures in the Rifle Brigade: Operation Bollock (Vertigo, 3-issue miniseries, 2001)
