= The Victor (comics) =

British comic book magazine

The Victor was a British comic paper published weekly by D. C. Thomson & Co. Ltd. The Victor ran for 1,657 issues from 25 January 1961 until it ceased publication on 21 November 1992. Associated with it was the annually published The Victor Book for Boys. This annual was first published in 1964, with the last edition published in 1994.

The Victor told adventure tales in comic book format. It featured many stories that could be described as "Boy's Own" adventures. Many of The Victor's stories focused on the exploits of the British military in World War II. In particular, each week the front cover carried a story of how a medal had been won by British or Commonwealth forces during the Great War or the Second World War. One of these, from issue 15, appeared in Classics from the Comics in May 2009. In addition to these, the comic also featured science fiction stories, adventure stories and sports stories.

A hardback book, The Best of The Victor, was published in 2010 ready to commemorate the 50th anniversary of this popular adventure comic. The book featured a selection of reprints from the weekly comic.

== Notable characters ==
- Alf Tupper – The Tough of the Track, a working-class runner.
- General Jumbo - A boy who commands his own mini-robot army, using an armband control pad, as a force for good.
- Daniel Mendoza - Mendoza the Great which was based on the real-life exploits of the classical pugilist.
- I Flew With Braddock – Into Battle With Matt Braddock - a World War II pilot.
- Sergeant Bob Millar of the Coldstream Guards – stories of a front line soldier in the Great War
- Morgyn the Mighty – Master of Black Island, who was previously in The Rover and The Beano.
- Gorgeous Gus - an aristocratic soccer player.
- Joe Bones the Human Fly - a working-class soldier and preternaturally talented climber, who was sent on dangerous missions.
- Figaro – an overweight, bumbling Mexican bandit, who also appeared in The Topper
- The Hammer Man – Chell Puddock, an English medieval knight in the Hundred Years' War, who wielded a hammer instead of a sword.
- Gerald Cadman – A cowardly British officer who, through the efforts of his batman, always came out smelling of roses.
- Ball Boy – The Beano's football daft boy appeared in both comics at one point.
- Jimmy Grant – The Goals of Jimmy Grant - a soccer player who later became manager of a soccer team.
- Send for Saxon - a series revolving around the adventures of the titular detective.
- Toro, Space Samurai - a science fiction series focused on the titular hero, who travelled the galaxy fighting injustice.

== See also ==
- List of DC Thomson publications
