= Warlord (DC Thomson) =

British comics anthology

- The first issue of Warlord was published in 1974, included a free gift and cost 5p.

Publication information
- Publisher: D. C. Thomson & Co. Ltd
- Schedule: Weekly
- Format: Ongoing series
- Genre: War
- Publication date: September 1974 – September 1986
- No. of issues: 627
- Main character(s): Codename: Warlord; Union Jack Jackson; Iron Annie

Warlord was a comics anthology published weekly in the United Kingdom between 28 September 1974 and 27 September 1986.

== Publication history ==
It was first published in 1974 by D.C. Thomson. The comic was dedicated to wartime adventures and was a popular success, leading IPC Magazines to create a competitor, Battle Picture Weekly, in 1975. Warlord included several stories per issue, initially centred on a character called Lord Peter Flint (Codename: Warlord), a World War II version of the popular spy James Bond.

At the end of 1978 Warlord absorbed D. C. Thomson's action comic Bullet. In total, Warlord ran for twelve years (627 issues), from 1974 until 1986, at which point it was incorporated into the long-running Victor. For the next four years after the comic's demise the publishers produced summer specials, ending in 1991.

Characters and stories included the popular Union Jack Jackson, Spider Wells, Bomber Braddock and Wingless Wonder. Features included True Life War Story and articles on weaponry called Weapons In Action. After Bullet was added to the comic, it featured that publication's main story Fireball — a secret agent who was Lord Peter Flint's nephew. The comic would often include free gifts such as replica military badges and plastic model warplanes. By solving a cryptographic puzzle and paying a small fee, a reader could become a "Warlord Secret Agent" with an identity card and code book, allowing him to decipher secret messages printed in the comic each week (a gimmick originally employed in the 1940s radio series Captain Midnight).

Before the addition of the more generally action-orientated Bullet, Warlord had been specifically geared towards stories and articles about World War II. Much of the language used in the stories was modern, and terms given used to describe the enemy reflected commonly used descriptions. The Allied forces always won in the end, and both Germans and Japanese were frequently negatively stereotyped.

Sometimes the Germans were shown in a heroic light, usually with honourable Wehrmacht or Luftwaffe officers as the heroes, and committed Nazis or SS officers as the bad guys. These tales were usually set on the Eastern Front to ensure the Germans were not shown killing their British or US enemies, the Russians being useful bogeymen. Comic Strips that followed this model included Iron Annie, about a heroic Junkers Ju 52 'Iron Annie' crew, and Kampfgruppe Falken which followed the exploits of a German penal battalion on the Eastern Front.

== List of major characters ==
Warlord included many stories and characters set mainly in World War II and later conflicts like Korea. Though most of them featured heroes from Allied nations such as the UK and the US, there were some series which took the German point of view.

They included:

- Union Jack Jackson: a British Royal Marine serving with the US Marine Corps in the Pacific campaign during World War II. To distinguish himself from his American comrades Sgt. Lonnegan and G.I O'Bannion (when using American equipment) he painted a Union Jack on his helmet, hence the character name. He was often referred to as U.J.J. by his American comrades, and served in the Pacific, Chinese, and European theatres of war. He actually originated in the pages of Hotspur in 1957, debuting as a text feature before becoming a comic strip star in the 'New' Hotspur in 1962.

Not to be confused with Union Jack, a Marvel Comics character created by Roy Thomas and Frank Robbins.

- Codename: Warlord: He was a British secret agent and can be considered a World War II James Bond. His real name/cover was Lord Peter Flint, a despised conscientious objector who refused to participate in the war. His usual opponents were the Gestapo, Abwehr and Japanese intelligence, who (despite his cover) seemed to know his true identity and referred to him as "Flint".

His boss in London was the Churchillian (in character and physique) and probably purposefully so, secret service head 'Kingpin' who was to Warlord as 'M' is to James Bond. Warlord's mannerisms and idiom were Edwardian English upper class with such phrases as 'old chap', 'then I'm a Dutchman' and the casual (having just thwarted the Germans single-handedly again) 'toodle pip' (meaning 'goodbye') as he made his usual breathtaking escape to retake the mantle of his alter ego, the stay-at-home English gentleman, Lord Peter Flint.

Recurring enemies included Karl Schaft, an honourable German Abwehr agent who was the mirror image of Flint in that both were patriotic and top agents, and Adolf Gruber, a stereotypical evil Gestapo agent who had met Flint before the war when he had been a servant for one of Flint's German friends. A stable accident left Gruber with a limp and he blamed Flint for the accident.

The storyline borrowed from The Scarlet Pimpernel the idea of a seemingly upper-class fop actually being a daring wartime agent. Flint's ability to live in the real world as a flawed human being but hold secret his knowledge of his other 'superhuman' traits (the British 'stiff upper lip') is analogous to the modern era's 'Superman'.

The character 'Fireball' in Warlord's sister comic Bullet (who ended up being incorporated into Warlord after Bullet was cancelled) was later revealed to be the nephew of Lord Peter Flint, and an older Flint made occasional guest appearances in the Fireball strip.

An aged Flint later reappeared in the digital Dandy's Retro Active story, as the commander of a superhero team.

- Killer Kane: Squadron Leader Kane of the RAF during and after the Battle of Britain. (Not to be confused with Buck Rogers' nemesis of the same name.)
- Kampfgruppe Falken: Major Heinz Falken leads a Dirty Dozen-like group of German soldiers from military penal battalions. Heinz Falken was the commanding officer of the battalion. He was an ex-panzer commander who had been sent to the penal battalion for not carrying out war crimes to please his Nazi commander during the Blitzkrieg campaign of 1940.
- Wolverine: French-Canadian Sergeant Revelle leads a mixed crew of Allied soldiers in a M10 Wolverine tank destroyer.
- Iron Annie: the adventures of Kurt Stahlmann of the Luftwaffe and his Ju 52 transport plane during World War II.
- Kelly's Choppers: Lieutenant Jack Kelly, a United States Air Force helicopter pilot in Korea.
- The Best of Enemies: During the Korean War, British Sergeant Tom Wilson forms a tense alliance with Muller, a German with whom he has old scores to settle.
- Harrier Squadron: The adventures of an international squadron of pilots flying the Harrier fighter-bomber during a future World War Three style conflict between the democratic Wesfed (Western Federation) and tyrannical Asbloc (Asian Block), thinly disguised versions of NATO and the Warsaw Pact. The continuation of an earlier storyline called Holocaust Squadron.
- Bligh of the Fastsure: Set in the same world as Harrier Squadron it centres on Royal Navy Captain Bligh, in charge of a flotilla of advanced hydrofoils fighting a guerilla war from the Orkney and Shetland Islands against Asbloc forces occupying Great Britain.
- Cassidy: US Navy fighter squadron leader Cassidy fights the Japanese in the Pacific.
- Rayker: Afro-American infantry Sergeant Rayker fights against both the Germans and racial discrimination in early 1945 Europe.
- Ryker: British Dispatch Rider who remains on Crete following the evacuation and fights a one-man war against the Germans using Zundapp Motorcycle he captured and fitted with 2 PIAT's from the huge hidden supply dump in a mountain cave which acts as his base and hideout! He sometimes operates with the Cretan Resistance and finally left Crete and returned to England. He was later to return in a second run where he was sent to Norway to assist the Norwegian Resistance this time equipped with a British BSA M20 Motorcycle armed with American Bazookas.
- Sgt Heavy: ex-SAS sergeant undertakes secret missions for clients in trouble after setting himself up as a private detective.
- Goum: Arab soldier who helps the British fight the Nazis in North Africa.
- The Bonzo Express: British Sergeant Pilot Jimmy Kells commands a joint UK-US group of pilots flying the titular aircraft, a Boeing B-17 Flying Fortress.
- I Don't Want to be a Corporal: Tom "Smudge" Smith enjoyed army life right up to the day he was promoted to corporal. Each week he attempted to get himself demoted, but always failed. In the final strip he believed he had finally succeeded, only to discover that he had been further promoted to sergeant.
- Jonah Jones: Commando Albert "Jonah" Jones was reputed to be the unluckiest soldier in the British Army. However, despite his frequent mishaps he usually ended up saving the day.
