= The Wizard (D.C. Thomson) =

British magazine

Publication information
- Publisher: D. C. Thomson & Co.
- Schedule: Weekly
- Publication date: 22 September 1922 – 16 November 1963; 14 February 1970 – 10 June 1978
- No. of issues: 1,970

The Wizard was launched as a weekly British story paper on 22 September 1922, published by D. C. Thomson & Co. It was merged with The Rover in November 1963, becoming Rover and Wizard. The last issue of the original Wizard was number 1,970; Rover and Wizard continued until the Wizard name was dropped in August 1969, and the paper renamed The Rover.

The Wizard was relaunched as a comic book on 14 February 1970, and continued until 10 June 1978.

== Regular features ==
- Blazing Ace of Spades — fictional RAF fighter pilot of the Second World War
- The Q Team — an association football team assembled by the mysterious Ka
- Ruthless Ruff — fictional RFC flying ace of the Great War
- Wilson the Wonder Athlete — the sporting adventures of a heroic character named William Wilson
- Wolf of Kabul — fictional agent of the British Intelligence Corps on the North-West Frontier Province

== Sources ==
- The Wizard (1970 series) at the Grand Comics Database
