= The Rover (story paper) =

British boys' story paper

The Rover was a British boys' story paper which started in 1922. It absorbed Adventure becoming Rover And Adventure in 1961 and The Wizard becoming Rover And Wizard in 1963, and eventually folded in 1973.

It included characters such as Alf Tupper and Matt Braddock, early examples of the "working class hero".
