= Graphic medicine =

Use of comics in medical education and patient care

Graphic medicine connotes the use of comics in medical education and patient care.

== Overview ==
The phrase graphic medicine was coined by Dr. Ian Williams, founder of GraphicMedicine.org, to denote "the intersection between the medium of comics and the discourse of healthcare". Comics offer an engaging, powerful, and accessible method of delivering illness narratives. The academic appraisal of graphic fiction is in its infancy, but its examination by academics involved in healthcare-related studies is increasing, with work emerging in journals.

It is notable that the medical humanities movement in many medical schools advocates the framework and use of literature in exploring illness, from practitioner and patient perspectives.

A late-2010s entry to the scholarly study of graphic medicine is the PathoGraphics Research Group, an Einstein Foundation-funded project at the Free University of Berlin (2016–2019) under the direction of Irmela Marei Krüger-Fürhoff, and with the collaboration of Susan M. Squier of the Pennsylvania State University. The group is concerned with the study of illness narratives, or "pathographies," and works of graphic medicine.

== History ==
=== Visual treatment and graphic novels ===
Comic books centered around public health originated in the 1940s; the earliest examples averaged around twelve pages and were aimed at preventive instruction for children. Early newsstand comics that focused on medical topics included EC's Psychoanalysis (1955) and Archie's Adventures of Young Dr. Masters (1964). Other early notable works of graphic medicine include the Strip AIDS anthologies (1987–1988); Al Davison's The Spiral Cage (1990); Milligan & McCarthy's Skin (1992); Pekar, Brabner, and Stack's Our Cancer Year (1993); and Bryan Talbot's The Tale of One Bad Rat (1994–1995).

Since the turn of the 21st century, dozens of comics and graphic novels have been published that address such health topics as depression, drug abuse, and PTSD. The genre has evolved and such graphic novels are now commonly at least 150 pages long and focus more on adult struggles with physical or mental illness.

In 2007, while writing a master's dissertation on medical narratives in comics and graphic novels, Ian Williams set up the Graphic Medicine website. During this period, he found two essays by Susan M. Squier on the topic; Squier is Penn State's Brill Professor of English and Women's, Gender, and Sexuality Studies, and she teaches graphic medicine to Ph.D. students at Penn State. Scholars from around the world who were interested in comics and healthcare began to get in touch, notably Professor Michael Green, who had recently set up a graphic narratives course at Hershey Medical School at Penn State University, and MK Czerwiec, a.k.a. "Comic Nurse", who had, for many years, been recording her experiences as an HIV/AIDS hospice nurse in comics form.

Green invited his colleagues Kimberley Myers, of the Medical Humanities Program at Penn State Milton Hershey Medical School, and Susan M. Squier, whose work Williams had encountered earlier, to the discussion group, and Williams introduced Maria Vaccarella, Giskin Day, and Columba Quigley. The group decided to hold a conference, in 2010 at The University of London, which led to a series of annual international conferences with presentations that are frequently posted as podcasts after the conference.

In 2014, the first American Library Association Will Eisner Graphic Novel Growth Grant was awarded to Ypsilanti District Library, (Ypsilanti, Michigan) for its proposal to build a collection of graphic medicine narratives. (Author MK Czerwiec lectured in the fall of 2014 at Ypsilanti's St. Joseph Mercy Hospital in support of this grant.) To date, the Ypsilanti District Library collection contains over 200 graphic medicine titles.

Penn State University Press published The Graphic Medicine Manifesto in 2015, which was nominated for the Eisner Award for Best Academic/Scholarly Work in 2016. The Graphic Medicine Manifesto was the inaugural volume in the ongoing Graphic Medicine series at Penn State University Press, which was originally co-edited by Susan M. Squier and Ian Williams. As of 2023, the series includes more than 20 titles.

In 2018, the United States National Library of Medicine launched the exhibition, "Graphic Medicine: Ill-Conceived and Well Drawn!", curated by Ellen Forney, which included a special display, traveling banner exhibition, and online exhibition.

In 2020, Technical Communications Quarterly published a special issue on comics and graphic storytelling. This issue included a category of research articles examining graphic health communication.

In 2021, Menopause: A Comic Treatment, published as part of the Graphic Medicine/Penn State University Press series, and edited by MK Czerwiec, won the Eisner Award for Best Anthology. In addition, Mimi Pond won the Eisner Award for Best Short Story for her contribution to the book, "When the Menopausal Carnival Comes to Town."

Beginning in 2021, the Graphic Medicine Review journal launched at MCPHS University thanks to reward moneys given by the Popular Culture association and implemented by the MCPHS Library. Led by A. David Lewis, GMR soon moved to the Lamar Soutter Library at UMass Chan Medical School with co-editor Mary Piorun. As an open access, peer review digital publication, GMR is indexed through several scholarly database systems and listed as 2993-8252 with the International Standard Serial Number (ISSN) International Center.

In 2022, the nonprofit Graphic Medicine International Collective debuted the Graphic Medicine Award, presented annually at the Graphic Medicine Conference. The GMIC Awards... "are an initiative to spotlight work in the comics field published in the previous calendar year which shines a light on issues of mental and physical wellbeing. Initially a single award, it expanded into a two-category award [long-form and short-form] in 2023."

Graphic medicine's popularity keeps growing across the world. In some clinical settings, graphic medicine is being used to explore therapeutic possibilities. Beyond the US and UK, graphic medicine is practiced and studied in Spain, Taiwan, Germany, India, Singapore, and a host of other nations; for example: Monica Lalanda's Medicina Grafica, the Japan Graphic Medicine Association (JGMA), and the Graphic Medicine Lab in India.

== Notable works of graphic medicine ==
Sources

- Ames, Jonathan; Haspiel, Dean (September 30, 2008). The Alcoholic. Vertigo Comics. ISBN 9781401210564.
- Beauchard, David (2005). Epileptic. Pantheon Books. ISBN 978-0375714689. — originally published in French from 1996 to 2003
- Bell, Cece (September 4, 2014). El Deafo. Abrams. ISBN 9781419712173.
- Brosh, Allie (October 29, 2013). Hyperbole and a Half: Unfortunate Situations, Flawed Coping Mechanisms, Mayhem, and Other Things That Happened. Gallery Books. ISBN 9781451666175.
- Burns, Charles (Oct 18, 2005). Black Hole. Pantheon Books. ISBN 037542380X.
- Chast, Roz (May 6, 2014). Can't We Talk About Something More Pleasant?: A Memoir. Bloomsbury. ISBN 9781608198061.
- Cunningham, Darryl (2011). Psychiatriac Tales. Bloomsbury.
- Dahl, Ken (2009). Monsters. Secret Acres. ISBN 9780988814998.
- Engelberg, Miriam (2006). Cancer Made Me a Shallower Person: A Memoir in Comics. HarperCollins. ISBN 9780060789732.
- Fies, Brian (2006). Mom's Cancer. Abrams. ISBN 9780810971073. — originally published as a webcomic beginning in 2004
- Farmer, Joyce (2010). Special Exits: A Memoir. Fantagraphics. ISBN 978-1606993811.
- Forney, Ellen (November 6, 2012). Marbles: Mania, Depression, Michelangelo, and Me. Avery. ISBN 9781592407323.
- Green, Katie (2013). Lighter Than My Shadow. Random House UK.
- Hart, Tom (January 12, 2016). Rosalie Lightning: A Graphic Memoir. St. Martin's Press. ISBN 9781250049940.
- Knisley, Lucy (February 26, 2019). Kid Gloves: Nine Months of Careful Chaos. First Second Books. ISBN 9781626728080.
- Kobabe, Maia (May 28, 2019). Gender Queer: A Memoir. Lion Forge Comics (Oni Press). ISBN 9781549304002.
- Krosoczka, Jarrett J. (October 9, 2018). Hey, Kiddo: How I Lost My Mother, Found My Father, and Dealt with Family Addiction. Scholastic Graphix. ISBN 9780545902489.
- Leavitt, Sarah (May 1, 2012). Tangles: a Story about Alzheimer's, My Mother, and Me. Skyhorse Publishing. ISBN 978-1616086398.
- Linthout, Willy (2010). Years of the Elephant. Ponent Mon S.L.
- Marchetto, Marisa Acocella (September 26, 2006). Cancer Vixen: A True Story. Knopf Publishing Group. ISBN 9780307263575.
- Pekar, Harvey; Brabner, Joyce; Stack, Frank (1994). Our Cancer Year. Four Walls Eight Windows/Running Press. ISBN 978-1568580111.
- Powell, Nate (Dec 2, 2008). Swallow Me Whole. Top Shelf Productions. ISBN 9781603090339.
- Roca, Paco (July 26, 2016). Wrinkles. Fantagraphics. ISBN 9781606999325. — originally published in Spain in 2007
- Small, David (September 8, 2009). Stitches. W. W. Norton & Company. ISBN 9780393068573.
- Streeten, Nicola (October 27, 2011). Billy, Me & You: A Memoir of Grief and Recovery. Myriad Editions. ISBN 9780956559944.
- Telgemeier, Raina (February 1, 2010). Smile. Scholastic Graphix. ISBN 9780545132060.
- Una (September 30, 2015). Becoming Unbecoming. Myriad Editions/Arsenal Pulp Press. ISBN 9781551526539.
- Wertz, Julia (September 15, 2012). The Infinite Wait and Other Stories. Koyama Press. ISBN 9780987963024.
- Williams, Ian (June 26, 2014). The Bad Doctor: The Troubled Life and Times of Dr. Iwan James. Myriad Editions/Penn State University Press. ISBN 9780271067544.

== Exhibitions ==
- 2018 "Graphic Medicine: Ill-Conceived and Well Drawn!", (United States National Library of Medicine), including the video "A Conversation about Graphic Medicine"
- 2022 "[Re]Framing Graphic Medicine: Comics and the History of Medicine" (University of Chicago) — featuring "serialized prints, illustrated newspapers and magazines, comic books, zines, digital comics and graphic memoirs," curated by Brian Callender and André G. Wenze

== See also ==
- Comic book therapy
- Narrative medicine
