= IPZ =

IPZ may refer to:

- RS-Line IPZ Racing, team of Australian auto racing driver Sascha Plöderl
- IPZ, IATA airport code of San Isidro de El General Airport, Costa Rica
- Intensive Protection Zone, designation of Matusadona National Park, Zimbabwe
- Investment Project by Zone, an incentive of the Investment Development Authority of Lebanon
- Inženjerski Projektni Zavod, firm that designed the Maslenica Bridge (D8), Croatia
- IPZ, code for the Inventment Promotion Zone railway station, a railway station in Sri Lanka
- Islands Protection Zone, a campaign of the Equitable Tourism Options NGO
