= Comic book therapy =

Use of comic books for rehab

Comic book therapy is a form of art therapy in which those undergoing rehabilitation or those who have already completed rehabilitation express their experiences through personal narratives within a comics format. The combination of text and image enables patients to process their memories and emotions through two different, yet compatible mediums. Comic book therapy can also be used in a psychotherapeutic setting, whereby clients are encouraged to read specific comic books, often surrounding topics similar to their own diagnoses. Clients are encouraged to present their thoughts and feelings they experienced while reading as well as to draw parallels with their own lived experiences based on the events that occur within the books. This is done in an effort to reach a cathartic moment of clarity and understanding of one's own life.

Both forms of therapy can be used throughout a patient's treatment process: immediately after diagnosis, throughout rehabilitation, and during the events that follow, including readjustment and general coping.

Comic book therapy is currently being applied to a variety of populations, including patients diagnosed with life-altering diagnoses (i.e. cancer, Dementia, Parkinson's Disease, diabetes, etc.), patients and family members experiencing severe illness or death, families undergoing therapy, sexual assault survivors, and soldiers returning from war. In 2011, one such therapy, originally conceptualized by Captain Russell Shilling, was being developed by the United States Defense Advanced Research Projects Agency (DARPA).

== Comic book therapy and graphic medicine ==
Graphic medicine, originally coined by Ian Williams, is a literary genre that combines the medium of comics and the discourse of medicine. In the 21st century, graphic stories, which are also referred to as adult-themed comics, have become a rising pop-culture trend. Graphic medicine owes its success in part to the rise of medical humanities, an interdisciplinary study of medicine and healthcare related topics. While medical humanities incorporate a variety of language-based subjects (i.e. philosophy, ethics, religion, etc.), graphic medicine strives to analyze the same healthcare-related topics using an artistic lens. The genre combines the conventionality of text with the eccentricity of images to present intimate narratives related to healthcare or medical experiences. These narratives are also sometimes referred to as "graphic pathologies", as they commonly discuss diagnoses of injury, illness, or disease.

Current professionals within the field are striving to develop a collection of graphic narratives that can act not only as a therapeutic tool for patients and their loved ones, but that serve as an educational tool for medical students as well.

The general concepts of graphic medicine and comic book therapy are often used interchangeably as they both strive to develop healthcare-related stories using both text and graphics. There is however a distinction that should be made. Graphic medicine acts as an umbrella term that encompasses a host of therapeutic techniques. Therefore, comic book therapy comfortably fits under its heading as just one of many therapies that the field of graphic medicine investigates.

== History ==
The foundations of the comics industry began in the early 1920s just after the culmination of the First World War. Initially starting out as small black-and-white strips, comics predominantly acted as entertaining filler space within national and local magazines and newspapers around the country. It was not until 1929 with the publication of The Funnies #1 that the first collection of comics material came about. The years following witnessed a spurt of comics publication that lasted up until present day with children and adults alike still knowing names like Batman, Superman, Peanuts, and Calvin and Hobbes.

Professionals within the graphic medicine field trace the history of comics back further than the early 1920s, however. Instead, they claim the origin of their academic field can be traced back to prehistoric cave drawings and man's desire to express himself with pictures. In this light, professors of graphic medicine and clinicians of comic book therapy include Egyptian hieroglyphics, Mayan and Aztecs drawings, and the great art of the Greeks, the Persians, and the Romans within the history of comic books as well. They do, of course, begin the story of comics specifically in 1938 with the publication of Action Comics #1, the first to detail the adventures and heroic efforts of Superman. The development of radio, television, and film only heightened the popularity of comic books and comic book characters; and by 1980, the merchandising of comic books hit an all-time peak. Today, comic books have slowly begun to matriculate within select topics of academia, now regarded as significant contributions to literary expression, covering topics of medicine, politics, economy, and social change.

== Current uses ==
Since its beginning, graphic medicine as a field of study has steadily become more relevant. As such, the use of comic book therapy as well as its functions have expanded as well. Today, comic books and graphic novels alike are being implemented in a variety of clinical and educational settings, likely due to its efforts in serving a variety of needs for a diverse target audience. Comic book therapies can serve multiple purposes. Some authors hope to relay information, creating a graphic encyclopedia of sorts. Therapists often collaborate with patients in comic book therapy to develop a closer relationship based on the tenets of empathy and understanding. Patients, more often than not, are encouraged to process difficult emotions and memories in the attempt to process, readjust, and engage in healthier coping strategies. Because of its multiple functions, graphic medicine and comic book therapy have been implemented both therapeutically and educationally in the medical field.

=== Therapeutic tool ===
==== Creating a comic book ====
One form of comic book therapy involves the creation of a comic strip, a comic book, or a graphic novel. The process by which a patient, family member, caregiver, or practitioner creates a comic book is complex and involves extensive research. In essence, the process of developing a comic book serves as a therapeutic coping mechanism that goes beyond text-based storytelling. Instead, patients are pushed to think through multiple media. The process can sometimes, hopefully frequently, lead to significant cognitive and emotion breakthroughs. These effects are likely due to the sheer versatility of the comic book medium, as they allow for the simultaneous expression of body image, verbal expression, physical action, and emotion.

Therapists often encourage patients to develop characters first, as this first step situates the patient in relation to their environment, past and present. Most often, the characters of comic book therapy novels imitate those within the author's own life, developing an autobiography of sorts. Occasionally, their experiences are identical to those of reality; often, an author chooses to reshape the narrative altogether, providing the reader an augmented reality of some kind. Patients take this opportunity to rewrite their story, making choices they didn't or couldn't during their own experiences. The comic book aspect acts as a safe avenue of release, in which a patient can comfortably create a world in which the consequences of actions are limited to panels in which they develop.

==== Reading a comic book ====
Another form of comic book therapy encourages patients, their support systems, and their healthcare providers to read already published graphic novels and comic books. As the field of graphic medicine has grown, so too have the collection of comic books and novels. As such, current graphic novels and comic books cover a wide range of topics, including cancer, Parkinson's disease, Schizophrenia, Alzheimer's disease, eating disorders, and so on. Popular novels include Cancer Vixen: a True Story by Marisa Acocella Marchetto, Tangles: A Story About Alzheimer's, My Mother, and Me by Sarah Leavitt, and Marbles: Mania, Depression, Michelangelo and Me by Ellen Forney. Therapists recommend novels that discuss similar experiences, similar diagnoses, similar personal histories to those of their own patients. Patients are encouraged to read them critically in the efforts of finding some kind of parallel between their own experiences and those described within the panels. This method of therapy goes beyond just reading a recommended autobiography. The images and graphics within each panel add to the narrative, bridging a gap between words and meaning. The way in which an author chooses to depict their characters, the environment, and the text are all important and contribute largely the reading experience.

==== Group therapy ====
Comic books have often been used as a source of therapy by providing the reader a way to associate themselves with the characters. The readers then can draw correlations between their own struggles parallel to the characters. In recent years this has been especially helpful, as comic books have continued to grow more inclusive to portray age, race, sex, and sexual orientation.

The way comic books are utilized in counseling is to provide the reader with self-awareness, thus a connection to their self through characters they identify with. According to Lauren Calhoun, this type of therapy is implemented by individual therapy, group therapy, and bibliotherapy.

The group approach is a newer take on comic book therapy and provides a way for clients to explore their values and beliefs. A study done with a group of 18-year-olds provided insight on how each one of them studied themselves through the lens of a shared character. After the session they were each asked to create their own comic book, and the results showed that each individual had found a way to empower themselves through the experience. Using comic books as a tool for therapy, especially in group settings is a potentially rich resource that should be further explored.

=== Educational tool ===
Current professionals within the field are striving to develop a field of study that can act not only as a therapeutic tool for patients and healthcare providers alike, but that can serve as an educational tool for medical students as well. With the advancement of technology and the diversification of the patient population, medical practices have undergone significant change within the last century. On the other hand, the education process prior to medical practice has remained arguably stagnant. Present day medical school programs cover material in three broad categories, including the scientific basis of medicine, patient care, and physicianship. The methods of teaching vary across universities, but the basic curricula remain the same across the board. With the evolution of medical practice arriving so quickly, some argue that medical training should follow in suit. According to the scholars of Graphic Medicine, there are multiple parallels between comic book therapy, when used as educational tool, and the everyday practice of medicine. In this way, having medical students engage in comic book therapy during their medical training could prove significant later on. The hustle and bustle of medical practice can prove stressful, especially for a new doctor fresh out of medical school. In order to prove oneself within the medical field, many believe an individual must possess characteristics like "competency," "professionalism," and "brilliance"; rarely are physicians referred to as "artistically creative" or "creative" at all.

== See also ==
- Graphic medicine
- Art therapy
- Psychotherapy
- Bibliotherapy
- Expressive therapy
