= Karl Sealy =

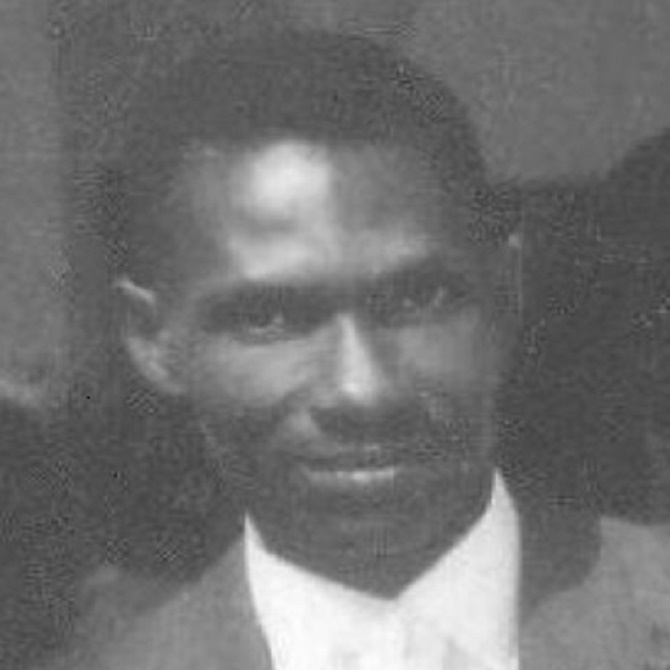
Sealy in 1962

Karl Sealy (1922-1993) was a Barbadian teacher, chess player, poet and short story writer. Edward Baugh called him "one of the finest, most compelling West Indian writers of prose fiction".

From 1945 to 1965 Sealy contributed 20 short stories to BIM, the Barbadian little magazine. His short story 'The Pieces of Silver' has been on the English GCE syllabus.

In 2003 a chess championship, the Karl Sealy Memorial Open, was established in his memory. Visit His Website for more about Karl Sealy

== Works ==
=== Short stories ===
- 'My friend Shuja-UL-Hassan', Bim Vol. 5, pp. 8–9
- 'Money to Burn', Bim 5, pp. 38–40, 89–91
- 'The Bargain', Bim 6, pp. 14–15. Republished in Bim: Arts for the 21st Century, Special Edition (November 2007)
- 'The Ping-Pong', Bim 6, pp. 40–43
- 'The Meeting', Bim 7, pp. 20–21, 91–93
- 'Dawn', Bim 8, pp. 55–56
- 'The Fields Are High', Bim 9, 60-63. Reprinted in Cecil Gray, ed. 2000, Response: A Course in Narrative and Comprehension and Composition for Caribbean Studies
- 'The Tree', Bim 10, pp. 154–61
- 'The Tacit Truth', Bim 11, pp. 232–236
- 'The White Baby', Bim 12, pp. 338–341
- 'Dream of Gold', Bim 13, pp. 16–18
- 'The Tryst', Bim 14, pp. 91–92
- 'The Cool of the Day', Bim 15, pp. 166–68
- 'Cup of Tea', Bim 17, pp. 34–36
- (with R. Atherly) 'The Song of the Fiddler', Bim 18, pp. 90–92
- 'The Day the Sun was Hidden', Bim 19, pp. 229–232
- 'The Hardings', Bim 21, pp. 44–48
- 'The Sun Was a Slaver', Bim 26, pp. 77–79. Reprinted in Barbara Howes, ed. 1971, From the Green Antilles
- 'My Fathers Before Me', Bim Vol. 27 (1958), pp. 135–38. Reprinted in Michael Marland, ed. 1978, Caribbean Stories; in Alison Donnell and Sarah Lawson Welsh, ed. 1996, The Routledge Reader in Caribbean Literature; and in Dean Baldwin and Patrick J. Quinn, ed. 2006, An Anthology of Colonial and Postcolonial Short Fiction.
- 'The Pieces of Silver', Bim Vol. 40, 279-284. Reprinted in Roy Narinesingh and Clifford Narinesingh, ed. 1980, Insights: An Anthology of Short Stories; in Beverley Naidoo, Chris Donovan, Alan Hicks and Michael Marland, ed. 1997, Global Tales: Stories from Many Cultures; and in Cecil Gray, ed. 2000, Response

=== Poems ===
- 'The Village', Bim 7, p. 54
- 'On the Emmaus Road' (extract from He is Risen, Bim 33, pp. 27–29. Reprinted in Howard Sergeant, ed. 1968, New Voices of the Commonwealth
