= Elizabeth Haynes =

Elizabeth Haynes may refer to:

- Elizabeth Haynes (crime writer) (born 1971), British writer of crime fiction
- Elizabeth Ross Haynes (1883–1953), African American social worker, sociologist and author
- Elizabeth Sterling Haynes (1897–1957), Alberta theatre activist
