= Polly Pattullo =

British author, journalist, editor and publisher

Polly Pattullo Hon. FRSL
- Born: London, U.K.
- Education: University of Edinburgh
- Occupations: Author, journalist, editor and publisher
- Known for: Co-founder of Papillote Press
- Notable work: Last Resorts: The Cost of Tourism in the Caribbean (1996); Fire from the Mountain: The Tragedy of Montserrat and the Betrayal of Its People (2012)
- Website: papillotepress.co.uk/abou/

Polly Pattullo Hon. FRSL is a British author, journalist, editor and publisher, who co-founded in 1998 the independent publishing company Papillote Press, based in Dominica, and London, England. Her writing has appeared in such publications as The Guardian, The Observer, Caribbean Insight, and Caribbean Beat, and she is the author or editor of several books, among them Last Resorts: the Cost of Tourism in the Caribbean (1996) and Your Time is Done Now: Slavery, Resistance and Defeat: the Maroon Trials of Dominica 1813–14 (2015).

Pattullo was elected an Honorary Fellow of the Royal Society of Literature (RSL) in 2022.

== Early years and education ==
Pattullo was born in London, England, and during her early childhood lived with her family at the boys' preparatory school in Richmond where her father was headmaster. As she has recalled: "We had books at home but I wouldn't consider my parents as having been 'great readers'. I remember a long, low bookcase in the sitting room with the Encyclopedia Britannica gathering dust on the bottom shelf. The books were mainly non-fiction — illustrated tomes about art or classical Greece — and Reader's Digest. I don't remember my parents reading novels but I do remember some tut-tutting about the trial of Lady Chatterley’s Lover — a book that certainly wouldn't have been their bedtime reading." After attending school in London, Pattullo went on to study politics at the University of Edinburgh, where her concerns and thinking broadened to include class, race and feminism.

== Career ==
=== Writing and activism ===
She worked as a journalist for many years, predominantly as an editor on British magazines and newspapers, including The Observer and The Guardian. Her first two books focused on the role of women in employment and politics: Women at Work, co-written with Lindsay Mackie (1978), and Power and Prejudice: Women and Politics, with Anna Coote as co-author (1990). In 1983 she wrote a pamphlet for the NCCL Rights for Women Unit, entitled Judging Women: A Study of Attitudes That Rule Our Legal System (illustrated by Ros Asquith), which, as described by the reviewer for The Observer, "presents a battery of cases to illustrate ... the questionable relationship between the British judiciary and legal profession and the women with whom they deal – whether as complainants, defendants, victims of crime, or lawyers themselves."

Pattullo also worked for the monthly political/economic journal Caribbean Insight, which involved her travelling for the first time to the Caribbean. This eventually led to her 1996 book, Last Resorts: The Cost of Tourism in the Caribbean, a critical assessment of the impact of the Caribbean tourism industry on the region, and a 2000 book about the Montserrat volcano crisis, Fire from the Mountain. Reviewing the latter in the Times Higher Education, James Ferguson stated: "Polly Pattullo's lucid account makes clear the Montserrat volcano affair cast unexpected light into one of the dustier recesses of British foreign policy.... Pattullo tells this story of separation and loss with an admirable blend of political objectivity and personal sympathy."

Pattullo's particular connection with Dominica goes back to her first trip there in 1984, when she did interviews with the writer Phyllis Shand Allfrey as well as with the then Prime Minister Eugenia Charles for The Observer Magazine. From 1988 to 1990, Pattullo ran Traveller's Tree, an initiative that organised ecotourism tours of Dominica, and in 1998 she undertook a round-island walk, completing it in 14 days. She now lives for several months of the year in Dominica. Her book The Ethical Travel Guide was first published in 2006; in addition, she has undertaken research for the NGO Tourism Concern. Pattullo also has qualifications as a teacher in adult literacy and has written about adult learning in the Caribbean.

In 2022, Pattullo was elected an Honorary Fellow of the Royal Society of Literature.

=== Papillote Press ===
Together with Anne Jno. Baptiste of Papillote Wilderness Retreat, the island's well-known eco-lodge and botanical gardens, Pattullo co-authored the 1998 book The Gardens of Dominica, which they published themselves in 1998, leading to the establishment of Papillote Press, specialising in books about Dominica and the wider Caribbean. In an early interview, Pattullo said: "Papillote Press only exists by being an unpaid one-woman operation and making sure that each book that is published generates enough cash to print the next book."

The company has since developed and broadened its remit, publishing a range of titles, both fiction and non-fiction, that reflect the culture and literary heritage of the region, and it has published winners of the Burt Award for Caribbean Young Adult Literature. Notable authors include Phyllis Shand Allfrey, Lisa Allen-Agostini, Alwin Bully, Trish Cooke, Alison Donnell, Jane Ulysses Grell, Lennox Honychurch, Stephenson Hyacinth, John Robert Lee, Diana McCaulay, Kathy MacLean, Philip Nanton, Elma Napier, Viviana Prado-Núñez, Lawrence Scott, Joanne Skerrett, Celia Sorhaindo, and others. A new initiative was formed in 2013, a book production company called the Papillote People's Press, which works with authors on their manuscripts up to delivery of books at publication.

In 2015, Pattullo compiled the anthology Your Time is Done Now: Slavery, Resistance and Defeat: the Maroon Trials of Dominica 1813–14 (introduced by Bernard Wiltshire), "a moving and valuable addition to the growing literature on slavery and slave resistance in the Americas."

== Selected bibliography ==
- With Lindsay Mackie, Women at Work, Tavistock Publications, 1977, ISBN 978-0422759809
- Judging Women: A Study of Attitudes That Rule Our Legal System, illus. Ros Asquith, NCCL Rights for Women Unit, 1983, ISBN 978-0946088072
- With Anna Coote, Power and Prejudice: Women and Politics, Weidenfeld & Nicolson, 1990, ISBN 978-0297810926
- Last Resorts: The Cost of Tourism in the Caribbean, Ian Randle Publishers, 1996, ISBN 978-9768100818
- The Gardens of Dominica, with Anne Jno. Baptiste, Papillote Press, 1998, ISBN 0953222403
- The Ethical Travel Guide, with Orely Minelli, Earthscan, 2006, ISBN 978-1844073214
- Fire from the Mountain: The Tragedy of Montserrat and the Betrayal of Its People, 2000; 2nd edition Papillote Press, 2012, ISBN 978-0957118706

As editor

- With Celia Sorhaindo, Home Again: Stories of Migration and Return, Papillote Press, 2009, ISBN 978-0953222452
- Your Time is Done Now: Slavery, Resistance and Defeat: the Maroon Trials of Dominica 1813–14 (introduction by Bernard Wiltshire), Papillote Press, 2015, ISBN 978-0957118775
