= Lisa Allen-Agostini =

Trinidadian journalist, editor and writer

- Born: 1970s Trinidad, Trinidad and Tobago
- Other name: Just Lisa
- Education: Lower Morvant Government School; Bishop Anstey High School; University of the West Indies, St Augustine
- Occupations: Journalist, editor, novelist, poet, dramatist, stand-up comedian
- Notable work: The Bread the Devil Knead (2021)
- Website: lisaallen-agostini.com

Lisa Allen-Agostini (born 1970s) is a Trinidadian journalist, editor and writer of fiction, poetry and drama. She is also a stand-up comedian, performing as "Just Lisa".

Allen-Agostini has been a columnist for the Trinidad and Tobago Guardian, writing both in Trinidadian Creole and in Standard English, and among other publications where her journalism appears are the Trinidad Express, Caribbean Beat, Caribbean Review of Books, and Trinidad and Tobago Newsday. She is the author of novels both for young people and adults, and her fiction and poetry have been published widely, including in Lightspeed, Wasafiri, sx salon, Susumba, Moko, past simple, and About Place Journal. She is a contributor to the anthologies Mothership: Tales of Afrofuturism and Beyond (edited by Bill Campbell and Edward Austin Hall, 2013) and New Daughters of Africa (edited by Margaret Busby, 2019). Allen-Agostini's debut adult novel, The Bread the Devil Knead, was selected in April 2022 for the shortlist of the Women's Prize for Fiction.

== Biography ==
=== Education and early literary career ===
Born in Trinidad, Allen-Agostini attended Lower Morvant Government School and Bishop Anstey High School, before going on to earn a first-class honours degree in English at the University of the West Indies, St Augustine, as well as studying stagecraft, having been an actor with the Trinidad Theatre Workshop.

Allen-Agostini's ambition to be a writer began early, and her 1991 win of a national schools poetry competition was the impetus for her to self-publish a book of poems called Something to Say in 1992. She began her career as a journalist by working at the Trinidad Express, as a feature writer and editor of a weekly youth magazine called Vox, from where she moved to the Trinidad Guardian in 1998. In 2001 an Alfred Friendly Press Fellowship enabled her to spend five months at The Washington Post, before returning to work in various capacities at the Trinidad Guardian until 2010. She has also written for the Caribbean Review of Books.

Her Young Adult science-fiction book, The Chalice Project, was published in 2008, and in the same year she co-edited and contributed to the crime anthology Trinidad Noir.

In 2009, she founded The Allen Prize For Young Writers – named in honour of her father – a not-for-profit company dedicated to developing the talent of young writers. She was awarded a scholarship by global advocacy organisation Women Deliver to attend their May 2013 conference in Malaysia. Also in 2013 she was shortlisted for the Hollick Arvon Prize for emerging Caribbean writers and was the 2014 Dame Hilda Bynoe writer-in-residence at St George's University in Grenada. She joined the Trinidad and Tobago Newsday team as a freelance reporter in 2017. That year, her YA novel Home Home won third-prize in the Burt Prize for Caribbean Young Adult Caribbean Literature and was published in 2018 by Papillote Press.

In 2019, she started the Caribbean feminist stand-up comedy partnership FemComTT with Louris Lee-Sing, performing at events as "Just Lisa" and "Lyrix", as well as co-hosting the online chat show The Givin' Trouble Show.

Allen-Agostini contributed "The Cook" to 2019's New Daughters of Africa, edited by Margaret Busby for Myriad Editions, and was a participant in an event showcasing the anthology at the NGC Bocas Lit Fest.

=== The Bread the Devil Knead (2021) ===
In May 2021, Myriad published her debut adult novel, The Bread the Devil Knead – described as a "rich, raw and urgent domestic noir novel of sex and survival set in Trinidad’s capital". Reviewer Joanne Owen wrote of it: "Every perfectly-placed word, every perfectly-formed sentence rings with truth and strikes deep. ... Raw and achingly beautiful, this really is remarkable." According to Literandra: "It is a book that will have you feeling breathless and angry, disturbed yet understood. It is honest, raw, and is likely to resonate with a lot of women around the world as it mercilessly exposes what it can mean to be a woman in a world run by men, and what it means to live at the intersection of gender, race, and poverty." The review in Scroll.in concluded: "The Bread the Devil Knead is a force and Lisa Allen-Agostini has set the standards very high for not just women’s writing, but global literary fiction. Bravo!"

Among others who praised the novel are Kei Miller ("You dip into the first page and don't come up for breath until the last... Thoroughly enjoyable") and Nalo Hopkinson ("Strips you down to raw nerve to build you back up again. Allen-Agostini has an unswerving eye").

In March 2022, The Bread the Devil Knead was announced as having been included on the longlist for the Women's Prize for Fiction, going on to make the shortlist of six.

== Awards and recognition ==
- 2001: Alfred Friendly Press Fellowship
- 2013: Women Deliver media scholarship
- 2013: Shortlisted for the Hollick Arvon Prize for emerging Caribbean writers
- 2014; Dame Hilda Bynoe writer-in-residence at St George's University, Grenada
- 2017: Burt Prize for Caribbean Young Adult Caribbean Literature, third prize for Home Home
- 2022: Shortlisted for the Women's Prize for Fiction for The Bread the Devil Knead

== Selected bibliography ==
- The Chalice Project (Young Adult sci-fi), Macmillan Caribbean, 2008.
- (As editor and contributor) Trinidad Noir, Akashic Books, 2008.
- Swallowing The Sky (poetry), Cane Arrow Press, 2017.
- Home Home (Young Adult fiction), Papillote Press, 2018; Delacorte, 2020.
- The Bread the Devil Knead, Myriad Editions, 2021. ISBN 9781912408993.
