= IDAL =

IDAL may refer to:

- IDAL, a computer language designed by Helene Kulsrud
- Illinois Digital Academic Library, a consortium merged in 2005 into the Consortium of Academic and Research Libraries in Illinois
- Investment Development Authority of Lebanon, the national investment promotion agency of Lebanon
- Item development assurance level, or item design assurance level, as defined in ARP4754, in avionics
