= Myriad Editions =

UK publishing house

- Parent company: New Internationalist (since May 2017)
- Status: Active
- Founded: 1993; 33 years ago
- Founder: Anne Benewick
- Country of origin: United Kingdom
- Headquarters location: Oxford
- Distribution: Turnaround Publisher Services (UK); Consortium Book Sales and Distribution (US)
- Key people: Candida Lacey (Publishing Director), 2005–2021; Corinne Pearlman (Creative Director)
- Publication types: Books
- Official website: myriadeditions.com

Myriad Editions is an independent UK publishing house based in Brighton and Hove, Sussex, specialising in topical atlases, graphic non-fiction and original fiction, whose output also encompasses graphic novels that span a variety of genres, including memoir and life writing, as well political non-fiction. The company was set up in 1993 by Anne Benewick, together with Judith Mackay, as a packager of infographic atlases.

In 2005, Myriad began publishing under its own imprint, with Candida Lacey as Publishing Director. With its stated aim being "to showcase new writers and artists, build fresh audiences for their work, and establish a literary niche against the mainstream", Myriad has built a reputation for discovering and nurturing award-winning authors, such as Jonathan Kemp, Elizabeth Haynes, Lesley Thomson, Darryl Cunningham, and Natasha Soobramanien.

Myriad's creative director, Corinne Pearlman, has stated: "Myriad's mission statement is quite simply to look for new voices, new ways of seeing. The First Drafts Competition for new writers who haven't yet been published has been a highly influential in bringing authors to our attention whom we go on to publish – or who find agents and other publishers as a result of their shortlisting. And the First Graphic Novel Competition was set up to reflect this – to encourage potential graphic novelists to get in on the act, whether established artists looking to adopt a new medium, or young artists on the first rung of the ladder, or experienced comics artists who had never before attempted a long-form work of graphic narrative."

In May 2017, Myriad Editions merged with Oxford-based independent, non-profit media co-operative New Internationalist.

== History ==
Myriad Editions was set up as a book packager in 1993 by Anne Benewick (1937–1998), who had been one of the founders of Pluto Press in the 1970s. Myriad's flagship atlas, The State of the World Atlas, was originally devised by Michael Kidron and Ronald Segal and is now authored by leading international peace researcher Dan Smith, OBE. It has sold more than 700,000 copies worldwide.

Myriad Editions continues to publish award-winning atlases that map political, social and environmental concerns. Most of the atlases are distributed internationally, through publishers including Penguin and the University of California Press in the US, Earthscan in the UK, Éditions Autrement in France, Eva in Germany, Obeikan in Saudi Arabia, Publifolha in Brazil, Maruzen in Japan, Sigma in Taiwan and Pajera in Thailand.

Myriad Editions also publishes special projects for the United Nations and other international organizations. These include a miniAtlas series on global development for the World Bank and a series of atlases on health issues for the World Health Organization and the American Cancer Society (with authors including Judith Mackay).

In 2005, Myriad Editions published The Brighton Book, a mixture of reportage, fiction, graphics and photographs; contributors included Jeanette Winterson and Nigella Lawson, alongside new writers. The imprint went on to publish full-length novels written by two of the anthology's contributors: Martine McDonagh's I Have Waited, and You Have Come and Lesley Thomson's A Kind of Vanishing.

In 2009, the independent publishing company was awarded an Arts Council England grant to further develop their fiction publishing. With this funding, Myriad was able to publish two début novels by local authors in 2009, The Cloths of Heaven by Sue Eckstein and Glasshopper by Isabel Ashdown.

In Spring 2010, Myriad Editions launched a fiction list with three new novels: The Noise of Strangers by Robert Dickinson, The Clay Dreaming by comic artist Ed Hillyer and The Spider Truces by Tom Connolly. The company went on to publish several more new novels, including Quilt, by Nicholas Royle, Invisibles by Ed Siegle, 4 a.m. by Nina de la Mer, Elizabeth Haynes's Into the Darkest Corner, winner of Amazon's Book of the Year in 2011 and Amazon's Rising Star Award for debut novels, and Sue Eckstein's second book, Interpreters.

The Myriad fiction list initially focused on first-time authors from the south-east of England but in 2013 the company increased and broadened its output, taking on titles from a more national and international perspective, as well as graphic novels. Among recent acquisitions are Belonging by Umi Sinha, Blackheath by Adam Baron, Noon in Paris, Eight in Chicago by Douglas Cowie, and North Facing by Tony Peake. Benjamin Johncock's novel The Pilot, published by Myriad in 2016, won the Best First Novel Award from the Authors' Club. Other well-received titles include Billy, Me & You by Nicola Streeten, the first long-form graphic memoir by a British woman to have been published, which was Highly Commended in the Popular Medicine category of the British Medical Association Medical Book Awards 2012, and The Inking Woman: 250 Years of Women Cartoon and Comics Artists in Britain. Myriad has gone on to publish a number of other notable books in the graphic medicine genre, including Ian Williams' The Bad Doctor (2014) and Una's Becoming Unbecoming (2015).

The Myriad non-fiction list includes books by such notable authors as Michael Norton OBE (365 Ways to Change the World, 2008), Lorna Goodison (Redemption Ground: Essays and Adventures, 2018) and Cynthia Enloe (The Big Push: Exposing and Challenging the Persistence of Patriarchy, 2018).

In March 2019, Myriad Editions published New Daughters of Africa: An International Anthology of Writing by Women of African Descent, edited by Margaret Busby (a follow-up to her 1992 Daughters of Africa), and in a collaboration with SOAS University of London launched an award linked to the anthology, the Margaret Busby New Daughters of Africa Award.

=== Merger with New Internationalist ===
In May 2017, a merger was announced between Myriad Editions and Oxford-based non-profit media co-operative New Internationalist (NI), whereby Myriad would continue to publish under its own imprint, with Candida Lacey and Corinne Pearlman remaining Publishing and Creative Directors respectively, while using the additional creative, sales and administrative resources of New Internationalist and having a presence in Oxford as well as in Brighton and London. Lacey said in a 2018 interview: "The merger has given us the ability to go global, beyond publishing UK-based debuts, and to build up a world literature list, allowing us to look for more diversity in writers and reach a wider readership that we didn't have before. NI has provided valuable editorial support in this area because of its track record in publishing political non-fiction and African fiction - where it has led the way, publishing the Caine Prize anthology every year."

Lacey stepped down as publisher of Myriad in September 2021.

== Competitions ==
=== First Fictions ===
In 2012, a biennial "boutique literary festival" called First Fictions was established by Myriad Editions in collaboration with the University of Sussex, with the aim of celebrating and championing first novels, both past and present.

=== First Drafts and First Graphic Novel Competition ===
As part of Myriad Editions' stated mission to support new writers and uncover new talent they organise two competitions for work in progress, in order to enable promising writers to benefit from constructive and professional feedback at an early stage in their careers.

The First Drafts competition (formerly called the Writer's Retreat Competition) has since 2010 been open to all writers who have not yet published or self-published a book of fiction to submit a prose fiction work-in-progress, the prize being a week-long writing retreat at West Dean College, near Chichester, in addition to detailed editorial feedback and mentoring by a Myriad author. A special edition of the First Drafts competition in 2018 invited submissions from women writers of African heritage, with the opportunity to win a place in New Daughters of Africa, edited by Margaret Busby. In November 2018, Rutendo Chabikwa and Anni Domingo were announced as the joint winners.

The First Graphic Novel Competition, held every two years, offers winners "the opportunity to develop their work with Myriad's creative and editorial team, with a view to future publication". The prize was first awarded in 2012, with the winner being published by Myriad the following year.

=== Myriad Comic Cuts ===
In 2017, Myriad teamed up with comedy television company Roughcut Television to launch the Myriad Comic Cuts graphic novel competition to find comedy drama scripts in graphic novel form that can be developed into a comic drama series for television.

== Mission and current focus ==
Myriad Editions states that its mission is "to make the personal political and the local international... to find new ways of seeing the world and our place within it. To this end, we are proud to publish extraordinary storytellers and their remarkable work—fiction or nonfiction, mapped, drawn or written, these are books for our times." A 2018 article described the company as "that rarest of beasts: a publisher that not only pushes the boundaries of what can be said, but also how we go about speaking. They produce new ways of seeing the world, through graphic novels, extraordinary fiction, explorative non-fiction, and even atlases." As publishing director, Candida Lacey said: "Today it feels more important than ever to find new ways of seeing the world and our place within it. We're interested in the story an author is telling, not whether the book is fiction or nonfiction, mapped, drawn or written. We need new ways of understanding the past and its relevance to the present; new ways of highlighting inequality and injustice; new ways to make the world a better place."

Notable Myriad authors include Lisa Allen-Agostini, Isabel Ashdown, Sefi Atta, Elleke Boehmer, Margaret Busby, Kate Charlesworth, Darryl Cunningham, Cynthia Enloe, Kate Evans, Lorna Goodison, Elizabeth Haynes, Kathryn Heyman, Ed Hillyer, Manu Joseph, Panos Karnezis, Jonathan Kemp, Susheila Nasta, Tony Peake, Woodrow Phoenix, Nicola Streeten and Lesley Thomson.

== See also ==
- Judith Mackay
- Michael Kidron
- Blank Slate Books
- Nobrow Press
- SelfMadeHero
