= Tourism Concern =

British ethical tourism organization

Tourism Concern was a British NGO, advocating ethical tourism through campaigning and educating the tourism industry and travelling public. It closed in September 2018. Its members and staff worked to highlight global tourism's negative impacts and potential solutions, believing that host communities should truly benefit, not suffer, from tourism development. Its web and print archives held by Warwick University (see external links) document the scope of its work over thirty years. Stated aims were 'to increase understanding of the impact of tourism on environments and host communities among governments, industry, civil society and tourists; and to promote tourism development that is sustainable, just and participatory, and which is founded on a respect for human rights.'

== History ==
Tourism Concern was founded in 1988 as an informal network, linking people around Britain with similar organisations elsewhere in the world. Its instigator and initial co-ordinator, Alison Stancliffe, was motivated by her experiences when teaching and travelling in South East Asia, where she became concerned that tourists were contributing to economic exploitation in poor regions of the world. Early network members included subscribers to a report commissioned by TEN - the Third World Tourism European Ecumenical Network - in 1988, 'The UK and Third World Tourism', also contacts suggested by counterpart organisations in TEN and further afield, e.g.Equitable Tourism Options(Equations)in India.

In 1989 the network's 100 members formed themselves into a membership organisation. The new council of management was drawn largely from the academic and global development sectors, where much of the emerging research and concern about tourism's impact was concentrated. In 1991 Tourism Concern opened its first office in Roehampton College London and employed a worker, Tricia Barnett. Barnett remained Director until 2011, overseeing the completion of charitable status in 1994, and co-ordinating the organisation's work programmes and membership growth.

After climbing to 1,000 in the early 1990s membership remained stubbornly stable, so early hopes of becoming a popular movement did not materialise. However, in contrast, the charity's influence and reputation grew steadily within the tourism and global development sectors, alongside its output of influential reports, such as 'Putting Tourism to Rights', a report on human rights abuses in the tourism industry launched at the House of Lords in London.

For example, in 2009 Jonathon Porritt, Co-founder of the Forum for the Future, wrote of the organisation, "As ever, Tourism Concern is at the forefront of efforts to ensure that the benefits of tourism are shared much more equitably". Messages sent to mark Tourism Concern's 21st birthday in 2010 included this one from Justin Francis of responsibletravel.com: "Congratulations on 21 years of holding the tourism industry to account for its impacts on local communities and destinations! Long may you continue to tell uncomfortable truths."

Publications which have featured Tourism Concern's work include Mowforth and Munt's book 'Tourism and Sustainability: New Tourism in the Third World', Leo Hickman's 'The Final Call'.'Peace through Tourism' edited by Blanchard and Higgins-Desbiolles contains a chapter on the charity's record putting human rights on the tourism agenda.

Completed under its second Director, Mark Watson (2012 -2018), ‘Water Equity in Tourism’ a high profile campaign funded by DFID among other sources, put tourism's relationship to water scarcity under the spotlight and included the charity's last of many resources for formal education, ‘Water for All’.

From this point on, Tourism Concern's awareness raising and campaigning was undertaken largely online, reaching out to a global audience through its website, with over 20,000 visits in March 2013, and its e-newsletter, which had just under 10,000 subscribers worldwide in the same month. A report on labour conditions in all-inclusive hotels was launched in March 2014 at the House of Commons, following research carried out in Barbados, Kenya and Tenerife. While making typically hard hitting recommendations, the charity was also able to document changes for the better in one of the destinations, Barbados, since its previous research there almost ten years before.

In 2014, facing an increasingly difficult financial climate and the loss of its free premises, Watson moved the organisation's operations completely online, disposing of the unique library and reducing staff. These actions kept the charity afloat while it was repositioned as primarily an online promoter of responsible tourism for ethical travellers. His small team developed an online Ethical Travel Guide and worked on increasing subscribing membership of three special interest groups: ethical tour operators, voluntourism companies and an academic network.

Meanwhile funding for the high quality research and campaigning work which had characterised the charity previously became increasingly hard to secure. Despite these difficulties Watson and colleagues produced a regular blog and campaign petitions; and several more reports and digital briefing papers were published before he resigned his post in March 2018. These dealt with international volunteering (July 2014), consumer perceptions of all-inclusives (January 2015), cruise tourism (March 2016), tourism and indigenous people and animals in tourism (both 2017). Members also funded a short film released on YouTube in January 2018, Casas sin Familias, linking the mushrooming holiday rental sector with the housing crisis in Barcelona.

After Watson's departure, research on the damaging impact of uncontrolled accommodation booking platforms on city communities continued, but so did the trajectory of dwindling membership and core funding. Even so, the trustees' abrupt closure announcement in September 2018, citing intractable financial problems, took Tourism Concern's membership, tourism professionals and human rights activists by surprise. An assessment by its founder of the wider industry and social trends that contributed to around closure was published in 2019.It was placed in an online resource archive on sustainable tourism website Travindy.com along with key reports and documents deemed to be of enduring relevance to researchers and activists engaged in addressing tourism's impacts on people and places. Travindy has since ceased hosting it but the archive can now be found online at www.oercommons.org

== Impacts on the tourism industry ==
Tourism Concern worked to change practice in the tourism industry and in consumer behaviour, initially through its influential quarterly, 'In Focus', and now using its website, with its campaigns evidenced by a stream of professionally researched reports. Over its lifetime it also produced extensive education resources for the formal education sector, always focusing on the experience of those affected by tourism development. All this output starts with concerns raised by host communities or by organisations working with them.

The following example illustrates Tourism Concern's approach to addressing impact issues. Following international terrorism crises in Kenya and Bali in 2002, Barnett and colleagues were alerted by partners on the ground that UK Foreign Office travel warnings advising travelers to avoid both countries were having a disastrous effect on the many Kenyan and Balinese communities dependent on tourism. Producing well documented research to back up its case, Tourism Concern succeeded in inducing the government of the UK to drop the warnings. Tourism Concern director Patricia Barnett said "We can no longer just stand aside and watch destinations suffer whilst they have no voice on whether British tourists can visit them or not." Early campaigns include work in Goa, where Tourism Concern fought to stop much needed water from being diverted from village wells to hotels. The campaign encountered much resistance from the tourism industry, while at the same time, Tourism Concern realised that there was little or no awareness of such issues among holidaymakers at this time, encouraging campaigns to be launched, and important issues of ethics in tourism to be raised.

Major achievements:

- A report for the UN Rio Earth Summit in 1992 outlined principles for sustainable tourism, which led to the participation of Tourism Concern in the creation of the Global Sustainable Tourism Criteria
- The 1991 Himalayan Trekking Code championed responsible trekking in the Annapurna region of Nepal and was the model for the current Code for Working Conditions for Porters promoted by the International Porters Protection Group.
- Unique host centred publications for students and schools contributed to the UK schools national curriculum and university courses: e.g. ‘Looking Beyond the Brochure’ video teaching pack, which received the prestigiousToura d’Or award in 2000, and online teaching package ‘Water for Everyone'.
- Successful lobbying for a World Responsible Tourism Day at the World Travel Market, one of the two largest annual global travel trade shows, which takes place in London.
- The adoption of policies on labour conditions for hotels, by all of the UK's leading tour operators, following a large campaign called "Sun, Sand, Sea and Sweatshops".
- Pioneered on its website in the late1990s, Tourism Concern's community tourism guide paved the way for online and print ethical travel guides offering small and independent businesses a chance to reach a worldwide clientele.
- Tourism Concern's Ethical Tour Operators Group and the Ethical Volunteering Group provided new safe spaces for operators normally in competition with each other to collaborate in tackling mutually challenging issues.

Noel Josephides, the Managing Director of tour operator Sunvil, said that Tourism Concern has been "like a small dog snapping at the heels of the industry. After years of throwing money at resorts to build rabbit-hutch hotels, the industry has finally realised that we're running out of carefully managed destinations. Tourism Concern is advising the big companies. It's working and it's worth all their effort."

== Campaigns and Reports ==
Tourism Concern's first major campaign was spearheaded by a ground breaking report, 'Beyond the Green Horizon', written for the United Nations Rio conference of 1992. The aim was to get tourism recognised as both an environmental and a development issue by the world's governments. Ten principles for sustainable tourism were listed, exemplified by case studies from Africa, Asia and Europe. A major issue highlighted was to remain live throughout Tourism Concern's thirty year history: displacement caused by tourism. A hard hitting campaign called 'Our Holidays their Homes' uncovered injustice around the world and led to a report linking tourism to human rights for the first time. Much of Tourism Concern's consequent work would touch on displacement in one form or another, such is its disastrous impact on people and places.

For example, in 2004 Tsunami Tourism Concern campaigned to raise the alarm on unfair tourism development in the affected areas. Information from a subsequent tsunami related project among coastal communities in India, which was funded by DFID, played an essential part in the Water Equity in Tourism (WET) campaign, launched in 2011. The research report for this campaign drew on contacts made in India, alongside those provided by a think-tank of international NGOs brought together by Tourism Concern.

Another long running strand of campaigning concerned the social and economic impacts of new trends in the tourist industry. In 2007, Tourism Concern began seriously addressing the issues for host communities raised by "gap year/voluntourism" packages. At the start of this work, Tourism Concern Director Tricia Barnett told The Times, "We are at a point where volunteering is dovetailing into tourism. More people want to volunteer abroad and the age group involved is getting bigger". The aim was to ensure that companies and NGOs offering these packages are providing genuine benefits to the recipient countries as well as to the volunteers. A specific aspect of the campaign is the documentation of the devastating impacts of 'orphanage tourism' highlighted in Tourism Concern's e-newsletter and website. In July 2014 Tourism Concern published a new report, 'International Volunteering - Filling the Gaps'. This highlighted good practice for prospective volunteers and best practice for companies offering volunteering holidays. Alongside the report, a new network of companies willing to work in accordance with those best practice conditions was created, to allow dialogue and sharing within the industry. Following the launch of the report Tourism Concern brought industry members and ethical volunteers together at a conference in October 2014.

In March 2014 at the House of Commons in London Tourism Concern launched a new research report on 'The Impacts of all-Inclusive Hotels on Working Conditions and Labour Rights'. This was commissioned by the IUF, which represents workers in the hotel industry. The report focused on hotel workers in Kenya (Mombasa), Tenerife and Barbados. A further piece of work, an online survey of consumer attitudes to all-inclusives, was completed in late 2014 and formed part of a developing strategy to engage more directly with tourists and travelers through the website. The survey report was published in January 2015.

The huge growth in cruise tourism was also identified for research and campaign as far back as the mid 1990s. In the 2010s new research triggered a campaign to highlight the cruise industry's troublesome impacts on destinations and working conditions on board ships, accompanied by a briefing, 'Cruise Tourism - What's below the Surface?' published in March 2016.

Recommendations for a code to help indigenous peoples engage successfully with tourism development were published in a briefing paper in 2017, and a campaign to implement its recommendations was still intended to be actioned at the time of closure. and at the end of that year a report raising disturbing issues and recommendations, 'Animals in Tourism', was launched at the House of Commons. This was the charity's final report.
