= Nicola Streeten =

British graphic novelist

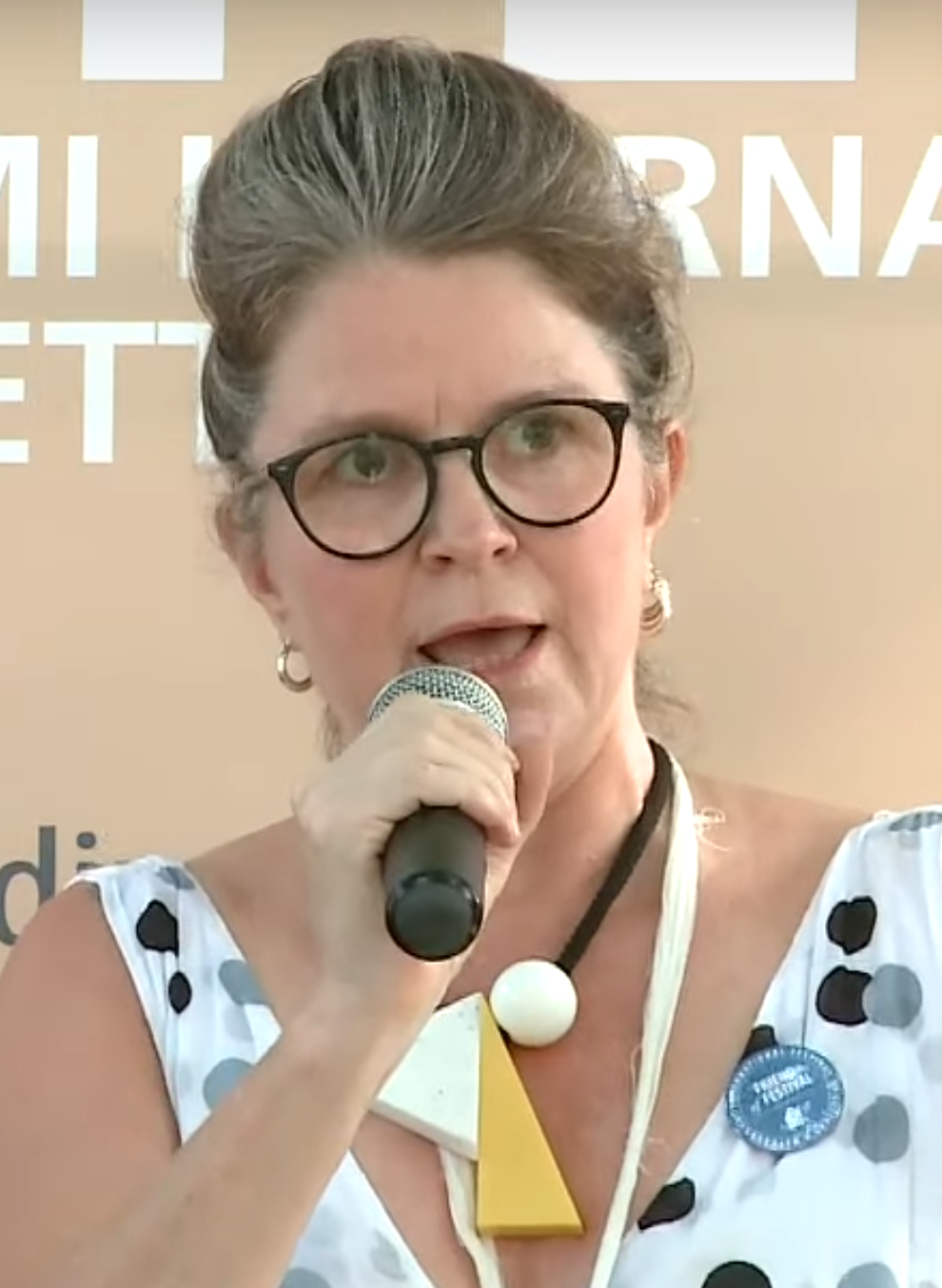
- Streeten speaking at the Mathrubhumi International Festival of Letters 2019 in India.
- Other name: Nicola Plowman
- Citizenship: British
- Education: University of Lincoln, MRes in Art, Architecture, and Design (Distinction)
- Known for: Billy, Me & You (2011); The Inking Woman (2018)
- Scientific career
- Workplaces: University of Sussex

Nicola Streeten (also using the name Nicola Plowman) is an academic, illustrator, cultural anthropologist, historian of British cartoonists, expert in the history of women cartoonists and British graphic novelist. Streeten is the co-founder of Laydeez Do Comics, author of Billy, Me & You: A memoir of grief and recovery (2011, Myriad Editions) and co-author of The Inking Woman: the history of British female cartoonists (2018, Myriad Editions) with Cath Tate.

== Publications ==
=== Billy, Me & You ===
Her graphic memoir, Billy, Me & You, is the first long-form graphic memoir by a British woman to have been published. It was published in 2011 and received press and media attention including being featured on Channel 4 News. The book is about the death of Billy, Nicola's and John Plowman's son, who died following cardiac surgery, aged two. The book emphasizes emotional disorientation, everyday logistics, and the fragmented experience of mourning. It is cited as an example of Graphic Medicine as it deals with the intersection of comics and medicine.

=== The Inking Woman ===
The Inking Woman was published in 2018. It is a picture-led history of the work of more than 100 named British artists, and some anonymous ones, documenting 250 years of women's cartooning and comics in Britain. The book accompanies the 2017 exhibition at London's Cartoon Museum, The Inking Woman: 250 years of Women Cartoon and Comic Artists in Britain. This exhibition was curated by Cath Tate, Kate Charlesworth, Anita O’Brien and Corinne Pearlman and was the first ever comprehensive exhibition of British female cartoonists and comics artists, with contributions from more than 80 women from the 1890s to the 2010s.

The Inking Woman book includes for example the Tamara Drewe creator Posy Simmonds, the Women's Liberation Movement and its embrace of cartoonists for example in publications like Spare Rib, Mary Tourtal – the often overlooked creator of Rupert Bear, or the contemporary DIY Cultures Festival in London. As Streeten said to the Scotland Herald:

"If you pick up any collection of cartoonists covering the same period you might be forgiven for thinking that there were none or almost no women cartoonists in the past or present. The Inking Woman gives the lie to this myth and brings together for the first time the wealth of talent that has been sitting there hidden in plain sight."

== Laydeez Do Comics ==
Laydeez Do Comics is a women-led comic forum that host monthly events with a focus on the autobiographical. It was set up in 2009 by Nicola Streeten and Sarah Lightman. There are now many Laydeez do Comics chapters, with events having appeared in Birmingham, Leeds, Bristol, Brighton, Glasgow, Dublin, Israel, New York City, Chicago, San Francisco and the Czech Republic in the years since its UK debut. Laydeez do Comics supports graphic novel work being currently produced in the UK by women. Laydeez Do Comics has also set up a one-day festival, supported by Arts Council England, the first of which took place on 24 March 2018 at the Free Word Centre. In 2018, Laydeez Do Comics set up the first Comics Women's Prize for Unpublished Graphic Novels in Progress supported by the Arts Council and a crowdfunding campaign. The 2018 award winner was Emma Burleigh.

== Academic career ==
Streeten's PhD research was on the cultural history of British feminist cartoons and comics 1970–2010 and she is an Associate Tutor and Research Associate at the University of Sussex. Streeten has conducted workshops with the British Council.

== Awards ==
- 2012 British Medical Association Book Award, Popular Medical Category for Billy, Me & You – Highly Commended
