= Jane Bryce =

British author, journalist, literary critic and academic (born 1951)

- Born: 1951 (age 74–75); Lindi, Tanzania
- Citizenship: British
- Education: Obafemi Awolowo University (PhD)
- Occupations: Writer, journalist, literary critic and academic
- Organizations: University of the West Indies, Cave Hill
- Partner: Philip Nanton
- Website: www.janebryce.com

Jane Bryce (born 1951) is a British writer, journalist, literary and cultural critic, as well as an academic. She was born and raised in Tanzania, has lived in Italy, the UK and Nigeria, and since 1992 has been based in Barbados. Her writing for a wide range of publications has focused on contemporary African and Caribbean fiction, postcolonial cinema and creative writing, and she is Professor Emerita of African Literature and Cinema at the University of the West Indies, Cave Hill.

She edited the anthology Caribbean Dispatches: Inside Stories of the Caribbean (2006), and is the author of a 2007 collection of short fiction, entitled Chameleon.

== Background ==
=== Early years ===
Jane Bryce was born in 1951 in Lindi, Tanzania, and grew up in Moshi. She was educated at schools in Tanzania until the age of 13, when she was sent to school in England. As she said in an interview in African Writing, "I have a British passport, because when I was born in Tanzania, it was a British protectorate. We were given the choice of citizenship at 'Uhuru' [independence] and my father opted for British. As he was deported under the Africanization policy, perhaps it's as well, but then again, if we'd been Tanzanian citizens we wouldn't have been deported." Since by now her father was working for the UN agency FAO, the family left for Rome in 1968 when she was seventeen.

=== Further education and career ===
In the 1980s, Bryce worked as a freelance journalist both in London and while studying in Nigeria, where she did doctoral research on Nigerian women's writing at Obafemi Awolowo University, from 1983 to 1988, earning a PhD.

In 1992, she moved to Barbados, becoming an active member of the Caribbean literary community. She taught African literature and cinema, in addition to creative writing, at the University of the West Indies, Cave Hill, and was editor of Poui: Cave Hill Journal of Creative Writing (first published in 1999) for 20 years, since its founding, and a noted contributor of poetry to the journal.

She also founded the Barbados Festival of African and Caribbean Film, of which she was a director from 2002 to 2007, and she was Barbados curator of the Africa World Documentary Film Festival (2009–2016).

She has contributed over the years to a wide range of academic journals and essay collections. She compiled the anthology Caribbean Dispatches: Beyond the Tourist Dream (Macmillan UK, 2006), and is the author of the 2007 collection Chameleon and Other Stories (Peepal Tree Press). In 2023 she published Zamani: a Haunted Memoir of Tanzania (UK: Cinnamon Press).

Bryce has served as a judge for literary awards both locally and regionally, including the Guyana Prize for Literature and the OCM Bocas Prize for Caribbean Literature.

In 2017, she was a visiting fellow at the Institute of Advanced Study at Indiana University.

In 2022, she guest-edited an edition of the online magazine WritersMosaic (an initiative of the Royal Literary Fund) entitled "Is english we speaking: African/Caribbean dialogue", contributors to which included Billy Kahora, Colin Grant, Stewart Brown, Funso Aiyejina, Philip Nanton, Tendai Huchu, Claire Adam and Robert Taylor.

== Bibliography ==
- Caribbean Dispatches: Beyond the Tourist Dream, editor (Macmillan Caribbean, 2006, ISBN 978-1405071369)
- Chameleon and Other Stories (Peepal Tree Press, 2007, ISBN 978-1845230418)
- Zamani: a Haunted Memoir of Tanzania (Cinnamon Press, 2023, ISBN 9781788649865)

=== Selected articles and book chapters ===
- "'Animal can’t dash me human rights'", Index on Censorship, volume 18, issue 9, 1989.
- "Peter Abrahams: The View From Coyaba", Caribbean Beat, issue 61, May/June 2003.
- "Unterrified consciousness" (on It Falls Into Place by Phyllis Shand Allfrey), Caribbean Review of Books, May 2005.
- "Poems of Penitence and Pilgrimage", sx salon, October 2010.
- "Riffing on Omeros: The Relevance of Isaac Julien to Cultural Politics in the Caribbean", Small Axe, 14:2, 2010.
- "'Who No Know Go Know': Popular Fiction in Africa and the Caribbean". In Simon Gikandi (ed.), The Novel in Africa and the Caribbean Since 1950, Oxford University Press, 2016.
- "Snapshots taken along the way", Writers Mosaic.
- "Abdulrazak Gurnah: 'In my mind I live there'". Writers Mosaic, 5 October 2022.
