= Philip Nanton =

Vincentian writer, poet and spoken-word performer (born 1947)

- Born: 1947 (age 78–79); Saint Vincent and the Grenadines
- Education: University of Sussex (DPhil)
- Occupations: Writer, poet, spoken-word performer, broadcaster and academic
- Partner: Jane Bryce
- Website: philipnanton.com

Philip Nanton (born 1947) is a Vincentian writer, poet and spoken-word performer, based in Barbados. A sociologist by training, who also teaches cultural studies, he is Honorary Research Associate at the University of Birmingham, and lectures at the University of the West Indies, Cave Hill. He has been a contributor on Caribbean culture and literature to journals and magazines such as The Caribbean Review of Books, Shibboleths: a Journal of Theory and Criticism and Caribbean Quarterly, and as a spoken-word artist has performed his work at festivals internationally. In 2012, he represented St. Vincent & the Grenadines at Poetry Parnassus in London.

Nanton's published books include Island Voices: From St Christopher to the Barracudas and Frontiers of the Caribbean (2014), Canouan Suite and Other Pieces (2016), and Riff: The Shake Keane Story (2021).

== Biography ==
Born in St Vincent & the Grenadines, Philip Nanton studied and lived in England between 1960 and 2000, when he relocated to Barbados. He began his career in British local government policymaking, and completed his D.Phil. at the University of Sussex (1986), following which he combined academic work with being a creative writer. Among his publications are two edited anthologies of literary criticism. He has written of his "personal journey, away from conventional disciplinary analysis, primarily sociological, to the use of creative expression for social analysis in the context of the Caribbean."

Among universities where he has taught, as well as performed work, are the University of Birmingham in England, St. Georges University in Grenada, the University of Missouri-St. Louis and, currently, the University of the West Indies, Cave Hill, in Barbados.

Also a broadcaster, Nanton has made radio documentaries on Caribbean literature and culture, including presenting for BBC Radio 4 in 1998 What Does Mr Swanzy Want?, the story of Caribbean Voices, an influential programme of the 1940s and '50s, and its producer Henry Swanzy.

In 2008, Nanton produced a spoken-word CD entitled Island Voices from St Christopher & the Barracudas, which was the basis of a 2014 book of the same name published by Papillote Press.

His collection of creative writings Canouan Suite and Other Pieces, a finalist for the 2014 Hollick Arvon Prize for Caribbean Writers (now the Emerging Caribbean Writers Prize) at the Bocas Lit Fest, was published in 2016 by Papillote Press, and was highly recommended for a 2018 Casa de las Américas Prize for Anglophone Caribbean Literature. In 2017, Nanton published Frontiers of the Caribbean (Manchester University Press), described by Robert Edison Sandiford as a "blend of the 'scholarly' and the 'creative'."

Nanton's most recently published book is Riff: The Shake Keane Story (2021), a biography of the Vincentian jazz musician and poet Shake Keane. Reviewing Riff (which Nanton dedicates to photojournalist and historian Val Wilmer), jazz critic John Fordham wrote: "Nanton is closely attuned to the expressiveness of the local Creole-derived dialect's vowel-stretches and musicality, and to those issues of migration, masculinity and nationalism that profoundly shaped his subject's life. ...Philip Nanton's fine book opens a window on both a jazz story and a literary story that the chroniclers of both fields have largely bypassed." In Caribbean Intelligence, John Stevenson's review concluded: "Nanton admirably succeeds in writing a highly engaging account of one of the Caribbean’s legendary creative forces."

== Honours and recognition ==
In 2012, Nanton's poem "Punctuation Marks" – from The Heinemann Book of Caribbean Poetry (edited by Ian McDonald and Stewart Brown, 1992) – represented Saint Vincent and the Grenadines in the project Poetry 2012: The Written World, in which a poem was chosen to capture the spirit of each nation competing in the 2012 Olympic Games in a collaboration with BBC Radio Scotland.

== Bibliography ==
=== Books ===
- (As editor) Remembering the Sea: An Introduction to Frank A. Collymore (2004)
- (Co-edited with Nick Toczec and Yann Lovelock) Melanthika: An Anthology of Pan-Caribbean Writing (L. W. M. Publications, 1977, ISBN 9780905393018)
- Island Voices from St. Christopher and the Barracudas; artwork by Caroline "booops" Sardine (Papillote Press, 2014, ISBN 978-0957118768)
- Canouan Suite and Other Pieces, poetry (Papillote Press, 2016, ISBN 978-0993108679)
- Frontiers of the Caribbean, monograph (Manchester University Press, 2017, ISBN 978-1-5261-1373-3)
- Riff: The Shake Keane Story, biography (Papillote Press, 2021, ISBN 9781999776893)

=== Selected shorter writings ===
- "What Does Mr. Swanzy Want – Shaping or Reflecting? An Assessment of Henry Swanzy's Contribution to the Development of Caribbean Literature", Caribbean Quarterly, Vol. 46, No. 1 (March 2000), pp. 61–72. Originally in Kunapipi Vol. XX, No. 1 (1998).
- "Shake Keane's Poetic Legacy", in Sandra Courtman (ed.), The Society for Caribbean Studies Annual Conference Papers, Vol. 1, 2000.
- "London Calling", Caribbean Beat, Issue 63, September/October 2003.
- "Frank A. Collymore: A Man of the Threshold", Kunapipi, Vol. 26, Issue 1, 2004.
- "The man who loved to have fun" (on Frank Collymore). Caribbean Beat (65), January–February 2004.
- "Power of one", The Caribbean Review of Books, August 2007.
- "Good to meet you ...", The Guardian, 1 March 2016.
- "Writing the St Vincent frontier" (https://doi.org/10.7765/9781526114921.00014), in Frontiers of the Caribbean. 30 January 2017.
- "'All that Greek manure under the green bananas': Migration in Derek Walcott's Omeros and Homer's The Odyssey". Migration Studies, Volume 6, Issue 3, November 2018, pp. 472–476 (https://doi.org/10.1093/migration/mnx068).
- "Caribbean 'frontier societies' like St Vincent are defined by the ever-present interplay between the civilised and the wild", London School of Economics, 10 December 2018.
- "Belonging and a Sense of Place", Writers Mosaic, 2021.
- "Seeing Slantwise", Arts Etc, 30 December 2022.
