= World Lung Foundation =

Non-profit health organization

- Founded: 2004
- Purpose: Public Health
- Location: New York City, New York
- Region served: Worldwide
- Services: Health Communications, Capacity Building, Project Management, Education, Operational Research
- Key people: Peter Baldini, Judith Mackay, Neil Schluger, Sandra Mullin

World Lung Foundation (WLF) is a non-profit foundation established in 2004 to support private organizations and government agencies, who work to improve lung health, predominantly in low- and middle-income countries.

WLF provides financial and technical assistance to governments and non-government organizations in four priority areas: Health Communications and Information, Capacity Building, Project Management, and Operational Research. These projects are in the following lung health areas: tobacco control, asthma, and tuberculosis. The organization also works on maternal health initiatives.

== Activities ==
WLF Projects WLF supports include:

Research

- Economic analysis
- Scientific conferences
- Pilot treatment programs

Public health policy

- Policy research
- Policy communications
- Advocacy

Capacity building

- Management/operations training
- Technology transfer
- Infrastructure development

Public health education

- Community programs
- Training practitioners
- Mass media ad campaigns

== Offices and locations ==
=== Headquarters ===
New York City

=== Team based ===
Beijing, Dar Es Salaam, Delhi, The Hague, Hong Kong, Melbourne, Moscow, Paris, Sydney, Egypt

=== Project locations ===
Afghanistan, Bangladesh, Colombia, Brazil, China, Egypt, India, Indonesia, Kenya, Mauritius, Mexico, Pakistan, Philippines, Poland, Russia, Tanzania, Thailand, Turkey, Ukraine, and Vietnam.

== Recent projects ==
=== Bloomberg Initiative ===
WLF is a partner in the Bloomberg Initiative to Reduce Tobacco Use, funded by Bloomberg Philanthropies and, more recently, the Bill and Melinda Gates Foundation. The goal of the Initiative is to reduce tobacco use in low- and middle-income countries, where 80% of the 6 million deaths resulting from tobacco use took place in 2011. WLF = funds and supports mass media ad campaigns on the harmful effects of smoking and other forms of tobacco use. WLF has supported 80 tobacco control mass media campaigns in 20 countries. WLF disbursed millions from Bloomberg Philanthropies and the Bill and Melinda Gates Foundation to The International Union against Tuberculosis and Lung Disease (The Union), the World Health Organization, the Framework Convention Alliance, and the CDC Foundation to strengthen their tobacco control activities and to support its own mass media programs. Other partners in the Bloomberg Initiative are Campaign for Tobacco-Free Kids and the Johns Hopkins University Bloomberg School of Public Health.

=== Maternal health ===
With financial support from Bloomberg Philanthropies, WLF has implemented an emergency maternal health obstetrics program in the Kigoma, Morogoro, and Pwani provinces of Tanzania. The program has trained 50 non-physician clinicians to deliver babies via cesarian section if needed, and midwives to assist in obstetrics care. In addition, WLF has renovated twelve rural health care centers and upgraded five district hospitals. This includes building three new maternity wards and operating theatres that are fully equipped with surgical equipment and reliable supplies of electricity and clean water. 26 staff houses have also been built.

=== TB Center ===
WLF helped fund Asia's first International Tuberculosis Center, which opened in Manila in 2008. The facility provides treatment, research, training and a steady supply of medications to combat Multi-Drug Resistant TB (MDR-TB) in the Philippines and across Asia. Since the opening of the center, dozens of clinicians from around the world have been trained on the best prevention, diagnosis and treatment techniques for MDR-TB.

== Advocacy resources ==
=== The Tobacco Atlas, Fourth Edition ===
The Tobacco Atlas is a compendium of research on tobacco use.

=== Multimedia resources ===
World Lung Foundation offers multimedia resources online to assist low and middle income countries interested in creating their own cessation and smoke-free ad campaigns.

=== 15000aDay.org ===
15000aDay.org is a website where advocates can support tobacco control policies.

=== Acute Respiratory Infections Atlas, First Edition ===
The Acute Respiratory Infections Atlas is a compendium of research on acute respiratory infections such as pneumonia, influenza, and respiratory syncytial virus (RSV).

== Available publications ==
Tahir Turk, PhD1; Nandita Murukutla, PhD1, Shefali Gupta, MA1, JagdishKaur, MD2; Sandra Mullin, MSW1, RanjanaSaradhi, MSW3, Pankaj Chaturvedi, MD4 (2012). Using a smokeless tobacco control mass media campaign and other synergistic elements to address social inequalities in India. Cancer Causes and Control, 23(0), 81–90. doi: 10.1007/s10552-012-9903-3

Alday J, Murukutla N, Cedillo C, et al. Smoke-free S ̃ao Paulo: a campaign evaluation and the case for sustained mass media investment. Salud P ́ublica de M ́ex 2010;52 (suppl 2):S216eS25. Mullin, S. Global anti-smoking campaigns urgently needed, The Lancet, Online First July 8

Mullin, S, Prasad, V., Kaur. J., Turk, T. Increasing Evidence for the Efficacy of Tobacco Control Mass Media Communication Programming in Low- and Middle-Income Countries, J of Health Communication, vol. 16, supplement 2, 2011

Mullin, S. Chapter 13 Risk and Crisis Communication: Practical Advice for Responding to Mass Fatality Events. Death in Large Numbers, The Science, Policy and Management of Mass Fatality Events, Gursky, E, Farinelli, M, editors. publisher AMA, 2012.

Murukutla, N., Turk, T., Prasad, C.V.S., Saradhi, R., Kaur, J., Gupta, S., Mullin, S., Ram, F., Gupta, P., Wakefield, M. (2011) Results of a national mass media campaign in India to warn against the dangers of smokeless tobacco consumption. Tobacco Control 2011; tc.2010.039438Published Online First: 20 April 2011 doi:10.1136/tc.2010.039438

Perl, R., Stebenkova, L., Morozova, I., Murukutla, N., Kochetova, V., Kotov, A., Voylokova, T., Baskakova, J. (October 2011). Mass media campaigns within reach: effective efforts with limited resources in Russia's capital city. Tobacco Control 2011;20:439-441 Published Online First: 18 June 2011 doi:10.1136/tc.2010.041269

Thrasher, J.F., Huang, L., Pérez-Hernández, R., Niederdeppe, J., Arillo-Santillán, E., Alday, J. (Feb. 2011) Evaluation of a social marketing campaign to support Mexico City's comprehensive smoke-free law. Am J Public Health;101(2):328-35.

Thrasher, J.F., Murukutla, N., Pérez-Hernández, R., Alday, J., Arillo-Santillán, E., Cedillo C, Gutierrez, J.P. (Under review). Linking mass media campaigns to pictorial warning labels on cigarette packages: An evaluation of impacts among Mexican smokers.

Turk, T., Murukutla, N., Gupta, S., Kaur, J., Mullin, S., Saradhi, R. (Under review). Addressing social inequalities in smokeless tobacco consumption through the implementation of a social marketing campaign and other synergistic elements in India.

Wakefield, M., Bayly, M., Durkin, S., Cotter, T., Mullin, S., Warne, C., for the International Anti-Tobacco Advertisement Rating Study Team. Smokers' responses to television advertisements about the serious harms of tobacco use: pre-testing results from 10 low- to middle-income countries. Tob Control 2011;tobaccocontrol-2011-050171Published Online First: 12 October 2011 doi:10.1136/tobaccocontrol-2011-050171
