= Tony Peake =

South African writer (born 1951)

- Born: 1951 (age 73–74); Johannesburg, South Africa
- Education: Waterkloof House Preparatory School; St. Martin's School; Rhodes University
- Occupation(s): Novelist, short-story writer and biographer
- Website: www.tonypeake.com

Tony Peake (born 1951) is a novelist, short story writer and biographer. He was born in South Africa, but has been based in Britain since the early 1970s.

== Biography ==
=== Early life ===
Tony Peake was born in Johannesburg, South Africa, in 1951, to English parents. His father, Bladon Peake (1902–1972), was a theatre and film director. Peake was educated at Waterkloof House Preparatory School in Pretoria, St. Martin's School in Johannesburg and at Rhodes University in Makhanda (formerly known as Grahamstown), where he read History and English, graduating with a BA (Hons) degree in English in 1973.

=== Career ===
Peake moved to London, England, in 1973. He worked as a production manager at the Open Space Theatre under Charles Marowitz and Thelma Holt. In the late 1970s, he lived for a while in Ibiza and taught English, History and Drama at the Morna Valley School. Since then, he has lived in London and Mistley and worked in modelling, acting, film distribution, and as a literary agent.

As a short-story writer and essayist, Peake has contributed to four volumes of Winter’s Tales (edited by Robin Baird-Smith, Constable); The Penguin Book of Contemporary South African Short Stories (edited by Stephen Gray); The Mammoth Book of Gay Short Stories (edited by Peter Burton, Robinson Publishing); New Writing 13 (edited by Toby Litt and Ali Smith, Picador); The Way We Are Now: gay and lesbian lives in the 21st century (a Stonewall (UK) anthology edited by Ben Summerskill, Continuum); Seduction (Serpent's Tail), a themed anthology that he also edited; Yes, I Am! Writing by South African Gay Men (compiled by Robin Malan and Ashraf Johaardien, Junkets Publisher, Cape Town); Speak My Language, and Other Stories (edited by Torsten Højer, Robinson Publishing), Best British Short Stories 2016 (edited by Nicholas Royle, Salt Publishing) and Queer Life, Queer Love (edited by Matt Bates, Golnoosh Nour, Sarah & Kate Beal, Muswell Press).

Peake is also the author of four novels, A Summer Tide (Abacus, 1993), Son to the Father (Little, Brown, 1995; Abacus, 1996), North Facing (Myriad Editions, 2017) and If It's Tuesday (Roundfire Books, 2025), plus the authorised biography of Derek Jarman (Allison & Busby, 2025; originally published by Little, Brown, 1999; Abacus, 2000; Overlook Press, 2000; the University of Minnesota Press, 2011).

== Works ==
=== Books ===
- A Summer Tide (Abacus, 1993), ISBN 0-349-10481-6 (trade paperback), ISBN 0-349-10553-7 (paperback)
- Son to the Father (Little, Brown, 1995; Abacus 1996), ISBN 0-316-87544-9 (hardback), ISBN 0-349-10807-2 (paperback)
- North Facing (Myriad Editions, 2017), ISBN 978-0-9955900-2-1 (paperback), ISBN 978-0-9955900-3-8 (e-book)
- If It's Tuesday (Roundfire Books, 2025), ISBN 978-1-80341-904-6 (paperback), ISBN 978-1-80341-913-8 (e-book)
- Derek Jarman: the authorised biography (Allison & Busby, 2025), ISBN 978-0749032906 (hardback), ISBN 978-0749032951 (e-book)

=== Short stories ===
- "Necessary Appendages", in Winter's Tales 7, edited by Robin Baird-Smith, Constable, London, 1991, ISBN 0-09-470810-X
- "Girl Dancing", in Winter's Tales 8, edited by Robin Baird-Smith, Constable, London, 1992, ISBN 0-09-471600-5
- "Necessary Appendages", in The Penguin Book of Contemporary South African Short Stories, edited by Steven Gray, Penguin, London, 1993, ISBN 0-14-023726-7
- "A Son's Story", in Winter's Tales 9, edited by Robin Baird-Smith, Constable, London, 1993, ISBN 0-09-472810-0
- "The Good Butler", in Seduction, edited by Tony Peake, Serpent's Tail, London, 1994, ISBN 1-85242-314-5
- "Crossing the Line", in Winter's Tales 10, edited by Robin Baird-Smith, Constable, London, 1994, ISBN 0-09-473830-0
- "A Son's Story", in The Mammoth Book of Gay Short Stories, edited by Peter Burton, Robinson Publishing, London, 1997, ISBN 1-85487-518-3
- "By the Pool", in The Gay Times Book of Short Stories: New Century New Writing, edited by P-P Hartnett, Gay Times Books, Millivres Ltd., London, 2000, ISBN 1-902852-19-2
- "A Portrait", in New Writing 13, edited by Toby Litt & Ali Smith, Picador, London, 2005, ISBN 0-330-48599-7
- "Fairy Tale", An essay in The Way We Are Now: gay and lesbian lives in the 21st century, edited by Ben Summerskill, Continuum, London, 2006, ISBN 0-8264-8785-8
- "History Lesson", Untitled Books, September 2008
- "Lucky for Some", Sunday Express, 17 January 2010
- "History Lesson", in Yes, I Am! Writing by South African Gay Men, compiled by Robin Malan & Ashraf Johaardien, Cape Town: Junkets Publisher, 2010, ISBN 978-0-620-45828-3
- "Raw Material", in The New Writer, May/June 2010
- "The Good Butler", in Speak My Language, and Other Stories, edited by Torsten Højer, Robinson Publishing, London, 2015, ISBN 978-1-47211-997-1 (paperback) ISBN 978-1-47211-998-8 (e-book)
- "The Bluebell Wood", in Anglo Files No. 177, September 2015
- "The Bluebell Wood", in Best British Short Stories 2016, edited by Nicholas Royle, Salt Publishing, 2016, ISBN 978-1-78463-063-8 (paperback) ISBN 978-1-78463-064-5 (e-book)
- "Your Call", first place in the 2021 Frome Festival Short Story Competition
- "Man Dancing", in Queer Life, Queer Love, edited by Matt Bates, Golnoosh Nour, Sarah & Kate Beal, Muswell Press, 2021, ISBN 978-1-83811-016-1 (paperback) ISBN 978-1-83811-017-8 (e-book)
