= Jonathan Kemp (writer) =

English writer (born 1967)

Jonathan Kemp (born 1967) is an English writer. He has published two novels, London Triptych and Ghosting, as well as one short-story collection, Twentysix, to date.

Kemp won the Authors' Club First Novel Award in 2011 for London Triptych. The book was republished in North America by Arsenal Pulp Press in 2013. Originally from Manchester, he teaches creative writing, literature and queer theory at Birkbeck, University of London. He is gay.

== Works ==
- London Triptych (Myriad Editions, 2010, ISBN 9780956251534)
- Twentysix (Myriad, 2011, ISBN 9780956792600)
- Ghosting (Myriad, 2015, ISBN 9780956251565)
- The Penetrated Male (Punctum Books, 2013, ISBN 9780615870861)
