= Anni Domingo =

British actress, director, and writer (born 1950)

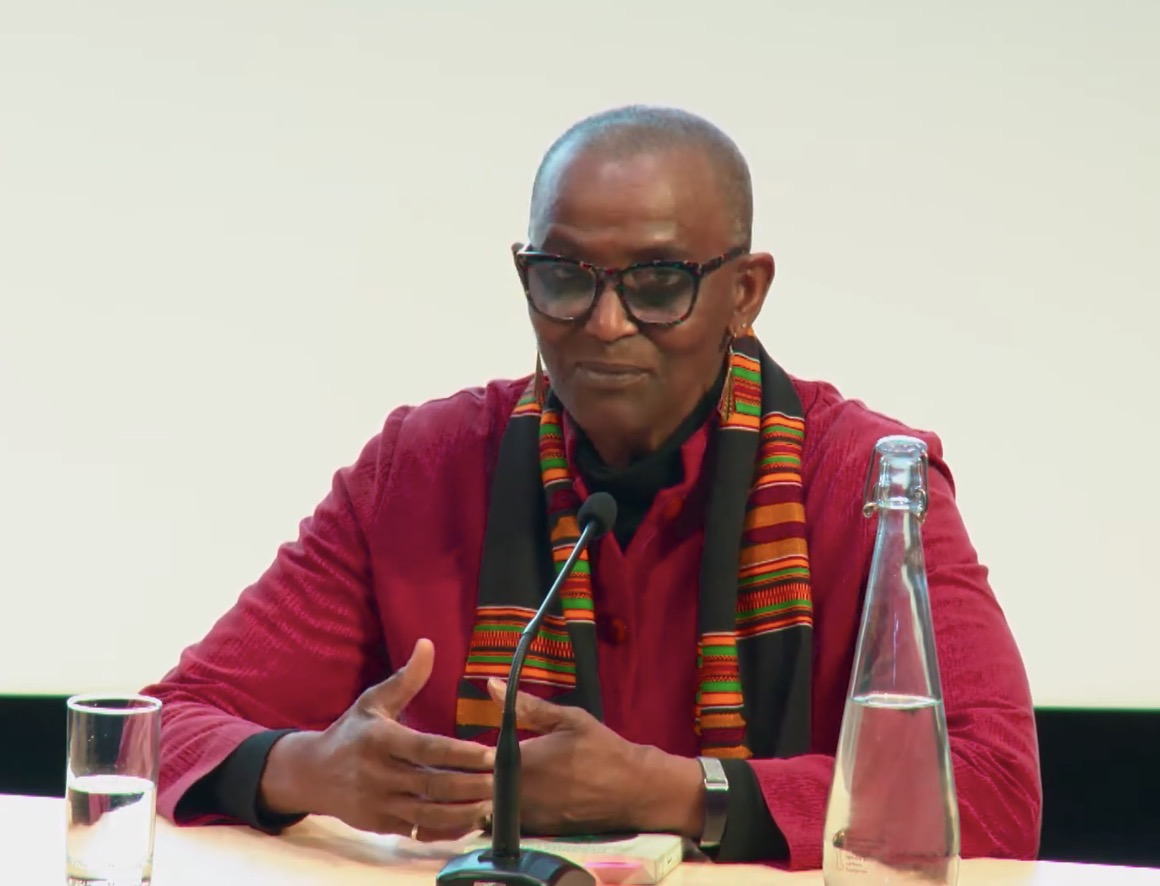
- Anni Domingo at Africa Writes Festival 2021
- Born: 1950s London, England
- Education: Rose Bruford College of Speech and Drama; The Open University; Anglia Ruskin University
- Occupations: Actress, director and writer
- Notable work: Breaking the Maafa Chain (2021)
- Awards: Myriad Editions First Novel competition, 2018

Anni Domingo (born 1950s) is a British actress, director and writer, working in theatre, television, radio and films. She additionally holds positions on the boards of several organisations in various sectors, and has said: "You can't make a difference unless you have a seat at the table." Her writing includes plays, poetry and fiction, with her debut novel Breaking the Maafa Chain published in 2021.

== Background and career ==
Anni Domingo was born in London, England, to Sierra Leonean parents, who when she was four years old decided to go back to their birth country so that their children would grow up with African culture. She attended school in Freetown (St Joseph's Convent School and Freetown Secondary School for Girls), going on to further education in the UK, where she pursued an ambition to act.

She applied for and was accepted on a drama course to train as a performer, also qualifying in her early 20s as a teacher of Speech and Drama at Rose Bruford College, and during her three years studying there she worked for the BBC at Bush House on radio plays to be broadcast in the Commonwealth. When in her mid-50s, over a seven-year period she earned a first-class BA Honours degree in Literature, another BA Honours degree (first-class) in Humanities with Creative Writing from The Open University, and an MA in Creative Writing from Anglia Ruskin University, Cambridge, later receiving the honorary degree of Doctor of Humanities.

Her acting career encompasses theatre, television, radio and film, with on-screen appearances in numerous TV series and feature films ranging from Outland (1981) to Wondrous Oblivion (2003). More recently, in 2019 she appeared in several episodes of BBC One's EastEnders, and on stage in Inua Ellams' adaptation of Three Sisters at the National Theatre. Her theatre work over the years has included Blood Wedding at the National, Treasure Island at Birmingham Rep, The Last Bloom at Traverse Theatre, The Crucible at Regent's Park, The Children's Hour and Yerma at the Royal Exchange, Blithe Spirit at the Leicester Haymarket, and No Boys Cricket Club at Theatre Royal Stratford East.

Among other work that Domingo undertakes is radio broadcasting, as well as lecturing (at such institutions as St Mary's University, Twickenham, and Rose Bruford College) and directing at the Royal Academy of Dramatic Art (RADA), the Central School of Speech and Drama) and elsewhere, recent productions being Ilé la Wà ("We are Home") by Tolu Agbelusi at Stratford Circus in 2019, and The Story of John Archer at Battersea Arts Centre in 2021.

As a Shakespearean actor, Domingo has toured extensively in Europe, the US and Australia. She started a company called Shakespeare Link through which she runs workshops on William Shakespeare in schools, youth clubs and theatres, and she has written several workbooks on Shakespeare that are used in schools. She has also written children's plays, short stories and poetry, and her poem "The Cutting" is published in the text of Bullet Hole, a 2018 play about female genital mutilation, in which she played the lead role at the Park Theatre.

Domingo's debut novel, Breaking the Maafa Chain, was shortlisted in the 2014 Lucy Cavendish College Fiction Prize, won the 1918 Myriad Editions First Drafts Competition, is extracted in Margaret Busby's 2019 anthology New Daughters of Africa, and was published by Jacaranda Books in 2021. Breaking the Maafa Chain is an "epic historical novel" based on the true story of Sarah Forbes Bonetta, an abolitionist and goddaughter of Queen Victoria.

In 2019, Domingo won a place at Hedgebrook, a retreat for women writers, and on the National Centre for Writing's "Escalator" programme, enabling her to begin working on her second novel, Ominira.

She was awarded a Harold Moody Postgraduate Research Studentship, launched in 2021, to undertake a PhD at King's College London, investigating how black Victorians have been portrayed in literature based on the media 1850–1880.

Domingo is a trustee of Rose Bruford College of Theatre and Performance, and is a member of the board of Sheffield Theatres Trust. She also has voluntary roles with other initiatives particularly concerned with improving diversity and inclusion in the creative industries.

In January 2022, she was appointed chair of Theatre Peckham, one of London's leading community-led theatres and learning academies, with the company's patrons including John Boyega, Jenny Agutter and Paulette Randall.

== Other activities and personal life ==
Domingo has three children and, alongside working in the arts, has served as a magistrate in Cambridgeshire.

== Bibliography ==
- Breaking the Maafa Chain, London: Jacaranda Books, 2021, hardcover ISBN 9781913090760, paperback ISBN 9781913090784. US: Pegasus Books, 2022, ISBN 9781643139265.

== Selected awards and recognition ==
- 2014: Shortlisted in the Lucy Cavendish College Fiction Prize (Breaking the Maafa Chain)
- 2015: BEFFTA Lifetime Achievement Award
- 2018: Joint winner (with Rutendo Chabikwa) of Myriad Editions First Drafts competition
