= 4 a.m. (novel) =

2011 novel by Nina De la Mer

- First edition including a quote from John Niven
- Author: Nina de la Mer
- Publisher: Myriad Editions
- Publication date: 26 August 2011
- Pages: 272
- ISBN: 978-0-9565599-5-1
- OCLC: 751657838

4 a.m. is the debut novel of Scottish author Nina de la Mer. It was first published in the UK on 26 August 2011 by Brighton-based publishing house Myriad Editions. The novel draws on the author's personal experiences and research, covering rave culture of the 1990s and peacetime life in the British Army.

== Plot ==
The book follows Cal and Manny, two British army chefs stationed in Germany during the early 1990s. The two are quickly bored by the daily comings and goings of military life and begin to take part in the activities of the red-light district in Hamburg, using recreational drugs and attending raves. Very soon, their drug usage begins to clash with their military duties and lives, leading to the pair undergoing pressure on their military jobs, friendships, and personal lives.

== Critical reception ==
The novel was reviewed in the Scottish and UK national press, with the Glasgow Herald remarking, "It's about time we had a female Irvine Welsh". The Guardian's Catherine Taylor took a more equivocal line, praising the novel's "electric" narrative but disliking the pop-cultural references. Mike Cobley of The Brighton Magazine was more impressed, writing "It had me gripped from the off, and by its close I felt I'd actually been willingly dragged kicking and screaming though Nina's fictional world, and emerged a more rounded and less judgmental human being for my efforts," adding, "Novel of the year? I've yet to read a better one." Lesley McDowell of The Scottish Review of Books wrote that "De la Mer does an excellent job producing authentic voices ... The depiction of troubled masculinity in an urban setting is something we have long associated with male Scottish writers, and it’s encouraging to see a woman take this subject on board."

De la Mer also received praise from her peers; novelist John Niven said that it was "Mesmerizing. And kind of frightening that a female writer can crawl so far into the male psyche", while Ian Rankin tweeted that the book was "very original, with really credible characters and a great sense of time and place", and Christopher Brookmyre called it "as vicariously thrilling in its portrayal of the hedonistic highs as it is honest in its depiction of how transient and empty those good times are".

Literary bloggers reviewed the book, with Pamreader calling it "an outstanding first novel", Mardi Stewart of New Books Magazine calling it "must read" and Alex Wood of the Caledonian Mercury referring to de la Mer's "fine grasp of character and ... perceptive engagement with serious issues."
