= Judith Mackay =

Hong Kong doctor

Judith Mackay SBS OBE FRCP FRCPE JP
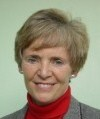
- Born: 1943 (age 82–83); Yorkshire, England
- Education: University of Edinburgh
- Known for: Tobacco control advocate
- Spouse: Dr John Mackay
- Scientific career
- Fields: Public health

Professor Judith Longstaff Mackay (born 1943) is a British physician and tobacco control advocate who has led a campaign against tobacco in Asia since 1984, campaigning for tax increases to discourage youth smoking, for the creation of smoke-free areas, and against tobacco promotion. Her main interests are tobacco in low-income countries, women and tobacco, and challenging the transnational tobacco companies. She is based in Hong Kong, where she is a permanent resident.

== Education ==
Mackay completed her medical training in Edinburgh and is now a Fellow of the Royal College of Physicians of Edinburgh and London. Mackay holds professorships at the Chinese Academy of Preventive Medicine in Beijing, the School of Public Health at the University of Hong Kong, and the Chinese University of Hong Kong.

== Career ==
Following a career in hospital medicine, since 1989 Mackay has been the executive director of the Hong Kong–based Asian Consultancy on Tobacco Control. Mackay is a Senior Policy Advisor to the World Health Organization. From 2006 to 2020 she was Senior Advisor, Vital Strategies, part of the Bloomberg Initiative to Reduce Tobacco Use in Low and Middle-income countries. While still based in Hong Kong, she is currently Special Advisor to the Global Center for Good Governance on Tobacco Control based in Thailand.

She has published about 300 papers and articles, and given over 650 presentations at conferences, especially on tobacco control, and serves as advisor or on the board of many international health organisations, for example Patron, Clear the Air; Hon Consultant, Department of Health, Government of Hong Kong SAR. She feels passionately about converting health statistics into maps and graphics, and has authored or co-authored 12 atlases, most published by Myriad Editions.

== Awards ==
In 1988 she was awarded the World Health Organization Commemorative Medal, in 1989 the US Surgeon General's medallion, and in 1992 the APACT Presidential Award. In 2000 she was selected by her peers for the Luther Terry Award for Outstanding Individual Leadership. In 2006 she was awarded the Lifetime Achievement Award by the International Network of Women Against Tobacco (INWAT), the Silver Bauhinia Star by the Hong Kong government, and the 60 Asian Heroes Award by TIME Magazine. In 2007 she received the Time 100 award for her work, in 2008 an OBE from Queen Elizabeth, and in 2009 the first-ever British Medical Journal award for lifetime achievement. She has received an award from His Majesty the King of Thailand for her work in Tobacco Control.

In 2010, her work was profiled by CNN. In 2015 she received an honorary degree, Doctor of Social Sciences honoris causa, from Hong Kong Shue Yan University. In 2016 she received an honorary degree, Doctor honoris causa, from the University of Edinburgh, Scotland, her alma mater. She has been named as one of the three most dangerous people in the world by the tobacco industry.

== Publications ==
- The State of Health Atlas. Myriad Editions; Simon and Schuster 1993. English and American editions (Simon and Schuster); German (Dietz); French (Editions Autrement); Swedish (Bokskogen) Health Atlas
- The Penguin Atlas of Human Sexual Behavior. Myriad Editions; Penguin, 2000; (and in French and German)
- The Tobacco Atlas (with Dr Michael Eriksen). Myriad Editions; World Health Organization, 2002, ISBN 92-4-156209-9
- The Atlas of Heart Disease and Stroke (with Dr George A. Mensah). Myriad Editions; World Health Organization, 2004, ISBN 92-4-156276-5
- The Tobacco Atlas, 2nd edn (with Dr Michael Eriksen, Dr Omar Shafey). Myriad Editions; American Cancer Society, 2006, ISBN 0-944235-58-1
- The Cancer Atlas (with Ahmedin Jemal, Nancy Lee, Maxwell Parkin). Myriad Editions; American Cancer Society, 2006, ISBN 0-944235-62-X
- The Tobacco Atlas, 3rd edn (with Dr Omar Shafey, Dr Michael Eriksen, Dr Hana Ross). The American Cancer Society and World Lung Foundation, 2009
- The Global Tobacco Surveillance System Atlas (with Charles W. Warren, Samira Asma, Juliette Lee, Veronica Lea). Myriad Editions; Centers for Disease Control Foundation, USA, 2009
- The Oral Health Atlas (with Roby Beaglehole, Habib Benzian, Jon Crail). Myriad Editions; FDI World Dental Federation 2009 ISBN 978-0-9539261-6-9
- The Tobacco Atlas, 4th edn (with Michael Eriksen and Hana Ross). The American Cancer Society and World Lung Foundation, 2012
- The Tobacco Atlas, 5th edn (with Michael Eriksen, Neil Schluger, Farhad Islami Gomeshtapeh, Jeffrey Drope). The American Cancer Society and World Lung Foundation, 2015.
- The GATS Atlas (Global Adult Tobacco Survey) (with S. Asma, S. Y. Song, L. Zhao, J. Morton, K. M. Palipudi, et al.), CDC Foundation, Atlanta, GA, USA, 2015.
- How COVID-19 took over the world: lessons for the future (with Christine Loh et al.), Hong Kong University Press, 2023.ISBN 978-988-8805-65-5

== See also ==
- Smoking in Hong Kong
