= Alison Donnell =

British academic

- Born: United Kingdom
- Education: UWC Atlantic College; University of Warwick
- Occupation: Academic
- Employer: University of Bristol
- Known for: Research on post-colonial Caribbean literature
- Notable work: The Routledge Reader in Caribbean Literature (1996); The Routledge Companion to Anglophone Caribbean Literature (2011); Lost and Found: An A-Z of Neglected Writers of the Anglophone Caribbean (2025)

Alison Donnell is an academic, originally from the United Kingdom. As of 2024, she is Professor of Modern Literatures in English and Head of School of Humanities at the University of Bristol.

Donnell was previously Professor of Modern Literatures and Head of the School of Literature, Drama and Creative Writing at the University of East Anglia. Before that, she was Head of School of Literature and Languages at the University of Reading, where she also founded the research theme "Minority Identities: Rights and Representations".

Donnell's primary research field is anglophone postcolonial literature, and she has been published widely on Caribbean and Black British literature. Much of her academic work also focuses questions relating to gender and sexual identities and the intersections between feminism and postcolonialism.

== Life ==
After leaving secondary school, Alison Donnell was educated at UWC Atlantic College, and at the same time her parents moved to India. She obtained her bachelor's degree in English and American literature from Warwick University and her PhD from the Centre for Caribbean Studies.

== Academic career ==
Donnell is the leading researcher of the Leverhulme Trust-funded project Caribbean Literary Heritage: Recovering the Lost Past and Safeguarding the Future. She has been awarded a number of research grants and fellowships, including a visiting Hurst fellowship, Department of English, Washington University in St. Louis and the James M. Osborne Fellowship in English Literature and History, Yale Beinecke Rare Book and Manuscript Library. In 2013 she was awarded a research fellowship by the Arts and Humanities Research Council (AHRC), to research sexual citizenship and queerness in the Caribbean, addressing the criminalization and intolerance of homosexuality in the region by contesting heteronormativity rather than homophobia. Donnell's work uses literature to show how sexual pluralism and indeterminacy are part of the Caribbean cultural world. She worked with CAISO, the Caribbean IRN and the IGDS at UWI on a series of public events called Sexualities in the Tent.

Her interests in literary histories and archives has led to an International Network led by a group of colleagues the University of Reading and funded by the Leverhulme Trust to help retain authors' papers and manuscripts, with a particular focus on Diasporic literary archives.

Her archival interests have also led to her development and directorship of a Doctoral Training Programme in Collections-Based Research at the University of Reading. This postgraduate training provides a pathway to a PhD, with a focus on museum and archives skills training and placement opportunities.

She was a founding and joint editor of the quarterly journal Interventions: International Journal of Postcolonial Studies from 1998 to 2011, and has an editorial role in The Journal of West Indian Literature and is a trustee of Wasafiri magazine.

== Works ==
Donnell has co-edited two major textbooks in the field of anglophone Caribbean literature. The Routledge Reader in Caribbean Literature (1996) recovered many lesser-known literary works, especially those published before the so-called "boom" of the 1950s. The Routledge Companion to Anglophone Caribbean Literature (2011) brings together three generations of critics to map a scholarly reassessment of the field.

Donnell's academic publications on recovery research of the poetry of Una Marson, and her edited collection of Marson's Selected Poems (part of Peepal Tree Press's Caribbean Classics series), have been particularly significant. Although celebrated as a pioneering black Jamaican feminist and nationalist, Marson's literary works were often dismissed for mimicking European style. Donnell has repeatedly argued that Marson's poetry powerfully represents her complicated relationship to both nationalism and feminism.

Donnell's essay "Visibility, Violence and Voice? Attitudes to Veiling Post-11 September" appeared in Veil: Veiling, Representation and Contemporary Art (2003), edited by David A. Bailey and Gilane Tawadros. The essay gained attention because of its discussion of the veil as a symbol of political and cultural identity in the Muslim world. Donnell discusses how the West's concentration on the veil diverts attention from other issues such as legal rights, education and access to healthcare, connecting to debates within Islamic feminism.

Donnell's 2025 book, Lost and Found: An A-Z of Neglected Writers of the Anglophone Caribbean (Papillote Press) is characterised by Jacqueline Bishop as "an astonishment and a revelation ... literary and biographical excavation at its best", and in the words of Bernardine Evaristo: "This is a fascinating groundbreaking and essential rewriting of literary history to include outstanding writers who fell from sight but whose works deserve to be better known." As Marina Salandy-Brown noted in Trinidad and Tobago Newsday: "It took Donnell 30 years of research to complete her dedicated task of reclamation. She delved to find what might have eluded others and found untapped sources, slowly creating, often helped by 'neglected' writers' families, colleagues and social media enquiry, a forgotten continent of Caribbean literary history." Bridget Brereton's review in the Trinidad Express concludes: "This wonderfully rich book rewrites the 20th-century literary history of the West Indies, and presents material on 25 fascinating authors who, for many reasons, never made it into the 'canon'. Donnell has given everyone interested in Caribbean writing a fine gift."

== Main publications ==
- Donnell, Alison; Bucknor, Michael A., eds. (2011). The Routledge Companion to Anglophone Caribbean Literature. Abingdon, Oxon / New York: Routledge. ISBN 9780415485777.
- Marson, Una (2011). Donnell, Alison (ed.). Selected Poems. Leeds, UK: Peepal Tree. ISBN 9781845231682.
- Donnell, Alison (2006). Twentieth-century Caribbean Literature: Critical Moments in Anglophone Literary History. London / New York: Routledge. ISBN 9780415262002.
- Donnell, Alison, ed. (2002). Companion to Contemporary Black British Culture. London / New York: Routledge. ISBN 9780415862509.
- Donnell, Alison; Polkey, Pauline (2000). Representing Lives: Women and Auto/biography. New York: St. Martin's Press. ISBN 9780312226671.
- Donnell, Alison; Welsh, Sarah Lawson, eds. (1996). The Routledge Reader in Caribbean Literature. London / New York: Routledge. ISBN 9780415120494.
- Donnell, Alison (2003), "Visibility, violence and voice? Attitudes to veiling post-11 September", in Bailey, David A.; Tawadros, Gilane (eds.), Veil: veiling, representation, and contemporary art, Cambridge, Massachusetts: MIT Press, pp. 122–135, ISBN 9780262523486.

Reprinted in: Donnell, Alison (2010), "Visibility, violence and voice? Attitudes to veiling post-11 September", in Jones, Amelia (ed.), The Feminism and Visual Culture Reader (2nd ed.), London / New York: Routledge, ISBN 9780415543705.

- Donnell, Alison (November 2012). "Caribbean Queer: new meetings of place and the possible in Shani Mootoo's Valmiki's Daughter". Contemporary Women's Writing. 6 (3): 213–232. doi:10.1093/cww/vps024.
- Donnell, Alison (2011). "Una Marson and the fractured subjects of modernity: writing across the Black Atlantic". Women: A Cultural Review. 22 (4): 345–369. doi:10.1080/09574042.2011.618658. S2CID 194091370.
- Donnell, Alison (1999). "Dressing with a difference: Cultural representation, minority rights and ethnic chic". Interventions: International Journal of Postcolonial Studies. 1 (4): 489–499. doi:10.1080/13698019900510781.
- Donnell, Alison (2002). "Nation and contestation: Black British writing". Wasafiri. 17 (36): 11–17. doi:10.1080/02690050208589781. S2CID 161847964.
- Donnell, Alison (May 2025). Lost and Found: An A-Z of Neglected Writers of the Anglophone Caribbean. Papillote Press. ISBN 9781739130312.
