= Lesley Thomson (novelist) =

British writer

Lesley Thomson Hon. FRSL
- Born: 1959 (age 66–67)
- Education: University of Brighton; University of Sussex
- Occupations: Novelist and creative writing tutor
- Website: lesleythomson.co.uk

Lesley Thomson (born 1959) is a British novelist and creative writing tutor at West Dean College.

== Biography ==
She grew up in London, England, and was educated at Holland Park Comprehensive School and the universities of Brighton and Sussex. She published her first novel Seven Miles From Sydney in 1987 with Pandora Press. She lives in Lewes, East Sussex, with her partner.

A Kind of Vanishing, a crime novel about a child who goes missing at the abandoned Tide Mills Village in Sussex, UK, in 1968, was published by Myriad Editions in 2007. It was republished with an afterword by the author and an endorsement from Ian Rankin in 2011 after winning the 2010 People's Book Prize for Fiction in 2010. Her book The Detective's Daughter won the eBook of the Year award on Sainsbury's eBooks as it was the most recommended book of 2013. Her next novel, Ghost Girl, was published in April 2014.
