= Elizabeth Haynes (crime writer) =

British writer of crime fiction

Elizabeth Haynes is a British writer of crime fiction.

== Biography ==
Elizabeth Haynes grew up in Seaford, East Sussex, and studied English, German and Art History at Leicester University. Her writing is partly inspired by her work as a police intelligence analyst in Kent.

She was encouraged to submit her debut novel Into the Darkest Corner following a creative writing course at West Dean College and it was published by Myriad Editions in February 2011. Elizabeth Haynes won the Amazon UK 2011 Rising Stars award and Into the Darkest Corner was Amazon UK's Book of the Year for 2011. Following publication by HarperCollins in the USA it became a New York Times bestseller.

Her second novel, Revenge of the Tide (U.S. title: Dark Tide), was published in the UK by Myriad Editions in March 2012 and her third novel, Human Remains, was published in February 2013. Haynes' fourth novel, Under A Silent Moon, was released on E-Book on 15 October 2013 and was released in paperback on 24 April 2014. Other publications include:

- 2015 Behind Closed Doors, Sphere
- 2016 Never Alone, Myriad Editions
- 2018 The Murder of Harriet Monckton, Myriad Editions
- 2021 You, Me & the Sea, Myriad Editions

== See also ==
- List of crime writers
