= Marisa Acocella Marchetto =

American cartoonist

Marisa Acocella
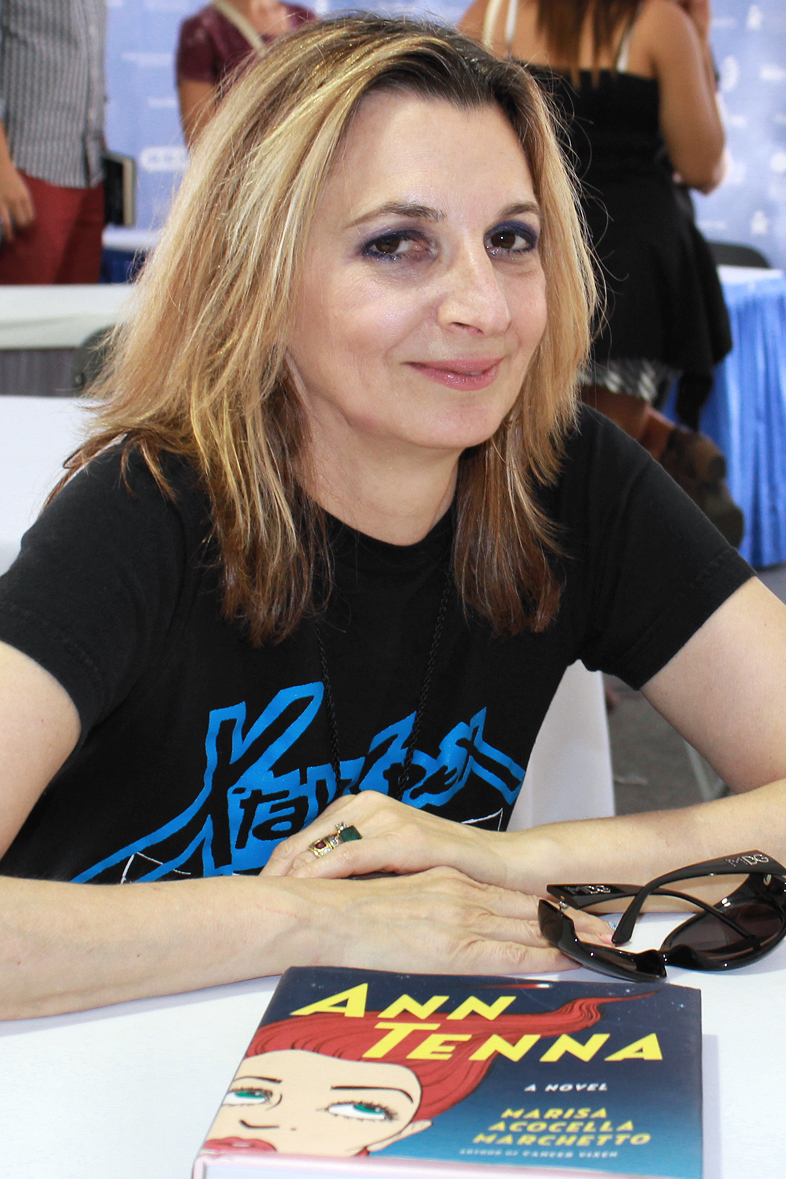
- Acocella at the 2015 Texas Book Festival
- Born: 1962 (age 63–64); New Jersey, U.S.
- Occupation: Author
- Spouse: Silvano Marchetto (m. 2004; div. 2017)
- Writing career
- Notable works: Ann Tenna; Cancer Vixen; Just Who the Hell is She, Anyway?
- Website: www.marisaacocella.com

Marisa Acocella (born 1962 in New Jersey) is an American cartoonist. She is the author of the New York Times best-selling graphic novel Ann Tenna, the graphic memoir Cancer Vixen, and Just Who the Hell is She, Anyway? She is also a cartoonist for The New Yorker and a columnist for W magazine's website. Her work has appeared in The New York Times, Glamour, and O, The Oprah Magazine.

== Personal life ==
Marisa Acocella was born in 1962 in New Jersey. One of four children, she grew up in Scotch Plains, New Jersey. She currently lives in New York City. Her father was a pharmacist, and her mother, Violetta, was a shoe designer. In her first drawings, Marchetto drew copies of her mother's shoe designs.

She attended the Pratt Institute in New York City, where she studied painting and eventually earned a degree from New York City's School of Visual Arts.

In 2004, she married former restaurateur Silvano Marchetto. Three weeks before their wedding, Acocella was diagnosed with breast cancer. Despite her diagnosis, the wedding went as planned, and she began her treatments. Her breast cancer diagnosis and early drawings about it inspired her popular graphic memoir Cancer Vixen. While undergoing chemotherapy, surgeries, and radiation treatments, she chose to refer to herself as a "cancer vixen," rather than "cancer victim."

In 2016, she filed for divorce from Marchetto. The divorce was finalized in 2017, and she took back her maiden name.

== Career ==
After graduating from the Pratt Institute, Acocella became an art director at J. Walter Thompson, a major Madison Avenue agency. There she met colleague Robert Kirshenbuam. After working together at J. Walter Thompson for four years, Acocella and Kirshenbuam left and founded Kirshenbuam and Bond, a boutique ad agency. After a few years there, however, Acocella moved on to become a senior vice president at Young & Rubicam.

While at Young & Rubicam, she began a comic strip entitled She. Its heroine served as her alter ego, and, beginning in 1993. the strip became a regular feature in the women's magazine Mirabella. The cartoon followed the heroine's struggles with what to wear and how to handle life choices. Acocella took a leave of absence from her job at Young & Rubicam to work on her graphic novel, Just Who the Hell is She, Anyway? The Autobiography of She, featuring the same character "She" from the Mirabella strip. But Acocella never returned to her job at Young & Rubicam after publication of the book, in 1994.

In the period spanning from 2000 to 2001, Acocella produced semi-regular comics journalism, a column called The Strip, for The New York Times, often on fashion topics.

In 2006, Knopf released her graphic memoir, Cancer Vixen: A True Story, about her battle, in 2004 and 2005, with breast cancer. Details in the memoir include her seeking cancer treatment without health insurance, which she had let lapse. It was first published in Glamour magazine as a six-page cartoon. Then, in 2006, the expanded graphic memoir was released as a book, depicting a woman with cancer, who chooses to live her life stylishly and fiercely, despite the illness. Acocella's story has been embraced by the breast cancer community and has inspired many, in the face of this disease, to become "vixens," rather than victims. Cancer Vixen was named one ofTime's top ten graphic memoirs. In 2013, HBO announced it was developing a Cancer Vixen film starring Cate Blanchett as Marisa Acocella Marchetto, but, as of 2020, the film is still in development.

Her next book, Ann Tenna, released in September 2015 by Knopf, is a New York Times best-selling graphic novel about an influential gossip columnist who has a near-fatal accident. She is brought face-to-face with her higher self, who challenges her to change her life for the better. Marchetto has said that her life-threatening breast cancer diagnosis informed the story arc of Ann Tenna.

The Big She-Bang: The Herstory of the Universe According to God the Mother was published in 2020 by Harper Collins. That graphic novel shares a story about rediscovering the Divine Female in order to bring balance back to the world.

Acocella is currently a cartoonist for The New Yorker.

== Charitable work ==
Acocella has donated a portion of her Cancer Vixen royalties to the Breast Cancer Research Foundation and is the founder of The Cancer Vixen Fund, which has funded free mammograms for uninsured women in New York City. The renamed Marisa Acocella Foundation funds free integrative therapies and free cold capping for women to prevent hair loss from chemotherapy at the Mount Sinai Dubin Breast Center and the Mount Sinai Beth Israel Comprehensive Cancer Center. The foundation also supports a complete empowerment program that includes yoga, Chi Qong, journaling, exercise, meditation, and nutrition. The Foundation's mission is: "No breast left behind."

== Bibliography ==
=== Comics journalism ===
- "The Sporting Life: You're Going into the Knicks' Locker Room?!!," The New Yorker (November 22, 1999): 67-68.

==== The Strip ====
- "Teen People Presents 'What's Next,'" The New York Times (November 19, 2000)
- "A book party for 'Dear Sisters' Dispatches from the Women's Liberation Movement," The New York Times (December 10, 2000): Style 3
- "Is the party over?," The New York Times (December 24, 2000): Style 3
- "Outside Apt, a new nightclub on West 13th," The New York Times (January 21, 2001): Style 3
- "Susan Miller looked to the stars to predict trends during fashion week," The New York Times (February 4, 2001): Style 3
- "For Ling, a model but not a supermodel, Fashion Week is the most unglamorous week of the year," The New York Times (February 18, 2001): Style 3
- "Two parties for Elle Magazine's young collectors, a group interested in the crossover of art and fashion," The New York Times (March 4, 2001): Style 3
- "The International Beauty Show at the Javits Center where 500 companies brought their latest products," The New York Times (March 18, 2001): Style 3
- "A lunch at La Caravelle for 'longtime friends' of the restaurant, where models showed Chanel's spring 2001 collection," The New York Times (April 1, 2001): Style 3

=== Books ===
- Just Who the Hell is She, Anyway? The Autobiography of She (Crown Books, 1994)
- Cancer Vixen: A True Story (Knopf, 2006)
- Ann Tenna (Knopf, 2015)
- The Big She-Bang: The Herstory of the Universe According to God the Mother (HarperCollins, 2020)
