= The Bad Doctor =

Graphic novel by Ian Williams

- First edition
- Date: 2014
- Page count: 220 pages
- Publisher: Myriad Editions

Creative team
- Creator: Ian Williams
- ISBN: 978-1908434289

The Bad Doctor is a 2014 graphic novel by Ian Williams, published by Myriad Editions. Williams is a doctor in Wales. It was the first graphic novel published by the author.

The story follows Iwan James, a general practitioner working in a small Welsh town (based on the author) who struggles with obsessive–compulsive disorder (OCD). Despite being respected professionally, Iwan is plagued by intrusive thoughts, compulsive behaviors, and a persistent sense of inadequacy that undermine both his work and his personal relationships. He is married to Carole, a nurse, whose patience and concern contrast with Iwan's emotional withdrawal and secrecy about his condition.

As the story unfolds, Iwan's OCD intensifies, affecting his interactions with patients and colleagues and deepening his isolation. His rigid self-expectations and fear of harming others contribute to a growing internal crisis. Eventually, Iwan seeks professional help and begins cognitive behavioral therapy, confronting both his illness and his longstanding guilt and shame.

While the novel does not present a complete resolution, it depicts Iwan taking tentative steps toward self-awareness and acceptance, emphasizing the ongoing nature of living with mental illness.
