= Becoming Unbecoming =

2015 graphic novel by English author Una

- First edition
- Author: Una
- Language: English
- Subject: Gender violence
- Genre: Nonfiction, Autobiography
- Published: 30 September 2015
- Publisher: Myriad Editions
- Media type: Print (paperback)
- Pages: 208
- ISBN: 978-1-908434-69-2

Becoming Unbecoming is a 2015 graphic novel by English author Una. It depicts the effects of misogyny and sexism on twelve-year old Una growing up in northern England in 1977 while the Yorkshire Ripper is on the loose, creating a panic among townspeople.

The novel follows two different timelines. The first deals with the rape of the author, and her subsequent harassment and shaming by the community. The second deals with the British police manhunt for the Yorkshire Ripper, show how police frequently blamed the victims instead of following leads. The novel was published on September 30, 2015, in the U.K. and November 1, 2016, in North America.

There are two English language editions: the original 2015 UK edition published by Myriad Editions and the North American edition published in 2016 by Arsenal Pulp Press. The book has been translated into Spanish, French, Dutch, Turkish, Italian and Portuguese (Brazilian).

Becoming Unbecoming was named a top ten book on the Amelia Bloomer List in 2017. The French edition of Becoming Unbecoming — L'Une D'Elles — was awarded the Prix Artémisia 2019 du combat féministe.
