= Isabel Ashdown =

British writer of contemporary fiction

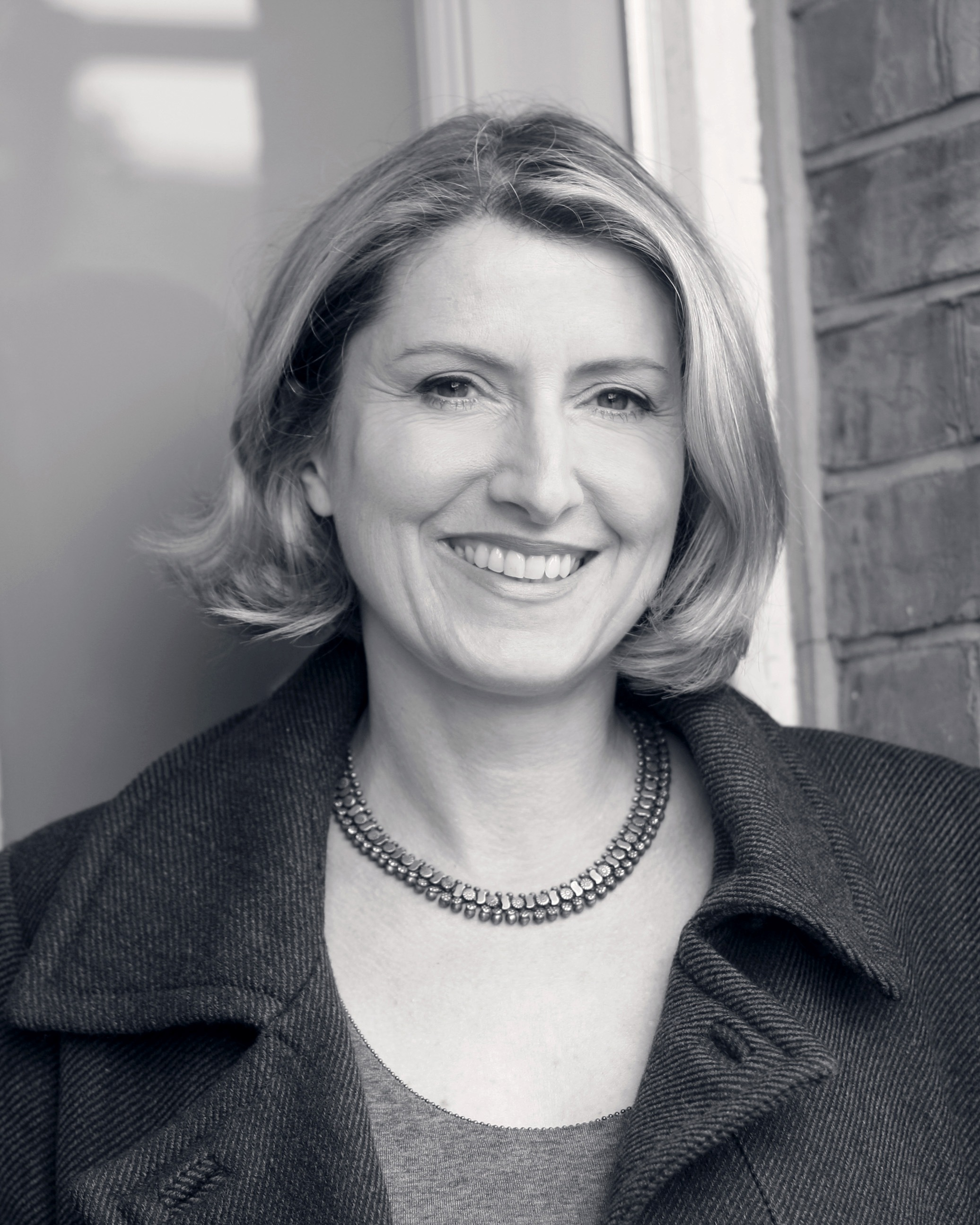
- Isabel Ashdown 2014

Isabel Ashdown (born 1970) is a British writer of contemporary fiction.

== Biography ==
Isabel Ashdown was born in London and grew up in East Wittering on the south coast of England. She is the author of eight novels, a Royal Literary Fund Fellow, and a member of the Society of Authors. In 2014 she was Writer in Residence at the University of Brighton.

Her debut novel was Glasshopper which received some critical appreciation. She started writing thrillers with "Little Sister" (2017).

She worked in education and product marketing, and currently writes full-time.

== Novels ==
Year	Title	Publisher	Notes
2020	33 Women	Trapeze	
2019	Lake Child	Trapeze	
2018	Beautiful Liars	Trapeze/Orion	Translations: USA, Netherlands
2017	Little Sister	Trapeze/Orion	Translations: USA, Germany, France, Italy, Netherlands, Greece, Poland
2015	Flight	Myriad	
2013	Summer of '76	Myriad	
2011	Hurry Up and Wait	Myriad	Translations: Germany
2009	Glasshopper	Myriad	Translations: Germany
