= Susan Miller (astrologer) =

American astrologer

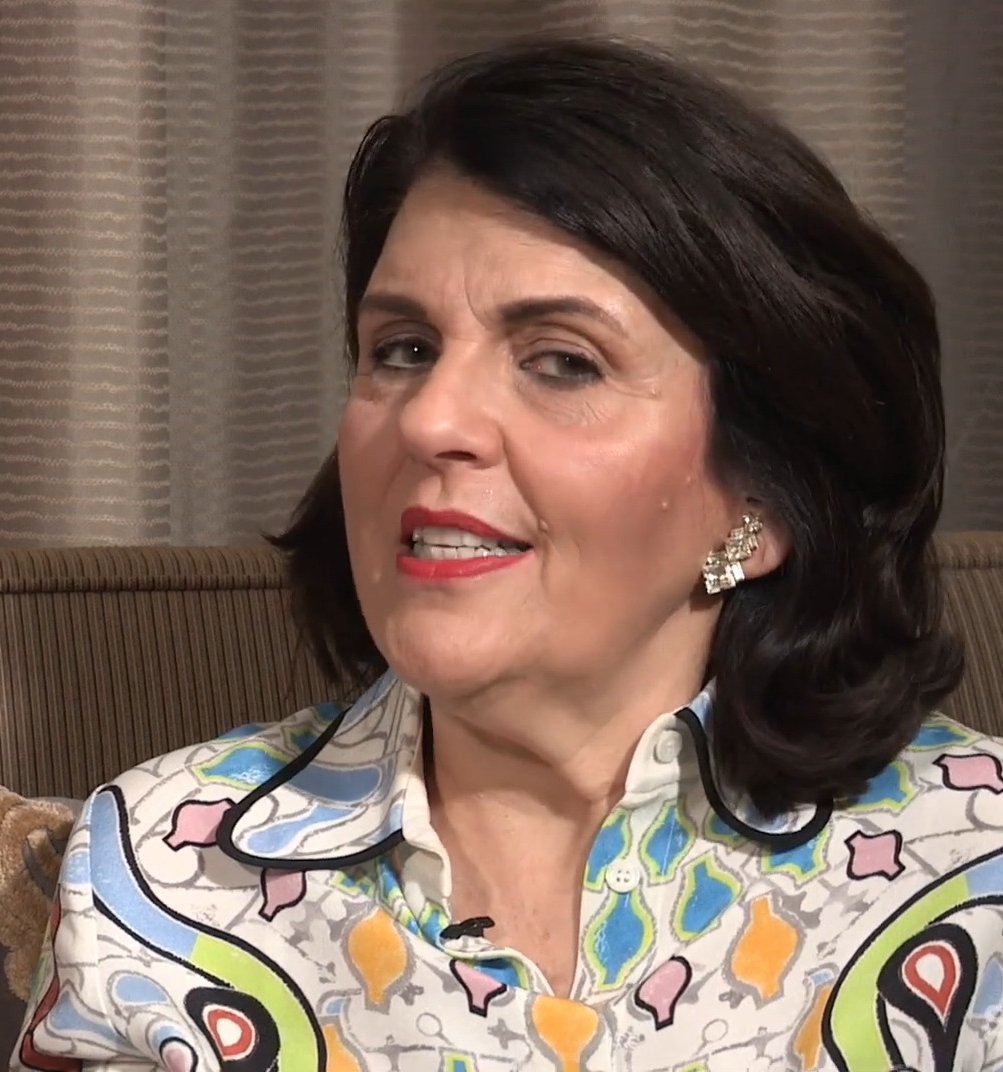
Miller in 2017

Susan Miller is an American astrologer. She is the author of eleven books, and regularly publishes online horoscopes. She is a regular columnist for various magazines including InStyle and Vogue.

A significant part of her subscribers comprises the younger millennial generation. She is especially popular in the UK with the Guardian describing her as the "queen of fortune telling" for millennials, "single-handedly responsible for fuelling their obsession with all things celestial". Miller has a celebrity following including Cameron Diaz, Justin Theroux, Pharrell Williams, Kirsten Dunst, Lindsay Lohan, Katy Perry, and Alexa Chung. In the fashion industry, those who appreciate her work include Glenn O'Brien, Cynthia Rowley, Bevy Smith, Gloria Vanderbilt and Mickey Boardman.

Despite focusing mainly on personal horoscopes, Miller has attempted predicting national events. She was wrong about Donald Trump losing the 2016 US elections and Hillary Clinton's email controversy not impeding her campaign but right about Barack Obama's 2012 re-election. After the start of the COVID-19 pandemic, Miller received backlash from some of her followers for prediction earlier in January, saying 2020 would "be a great year, and it will be a prosperous year". Her official stance on astrology is that "[it] can give her insight into the circumstances of the future, but not necessarily the outcome." On this, Gabrielle Bluestone from the New York Times, wrote that Miller's forecasts are "kindly advice on living what she deems a 'wholesome life'"; adding that "No matter what happens, she reassures her followers each month, you’re going to be fine, and if you’re not, here are some ways to cope." Bluestone further compares her appeal to that of a mental health counselor who uses astrology instead of the DSM-5.

== Personal life ==
Miller was born in the late 1950s. Miller was homeschooled and her mother taught her astrology. She graduated with an MA in business from the New York University. She used to work as a photography agent. She began writing horoscopes for Time Warner in the 1990s. She lives in Upper East Side, Manhattan, and has two daughters. Miller suffers from chronic illnesses that she had since she was fourteen.
