= Ellen Forney =

American cartoonist (born 1968)

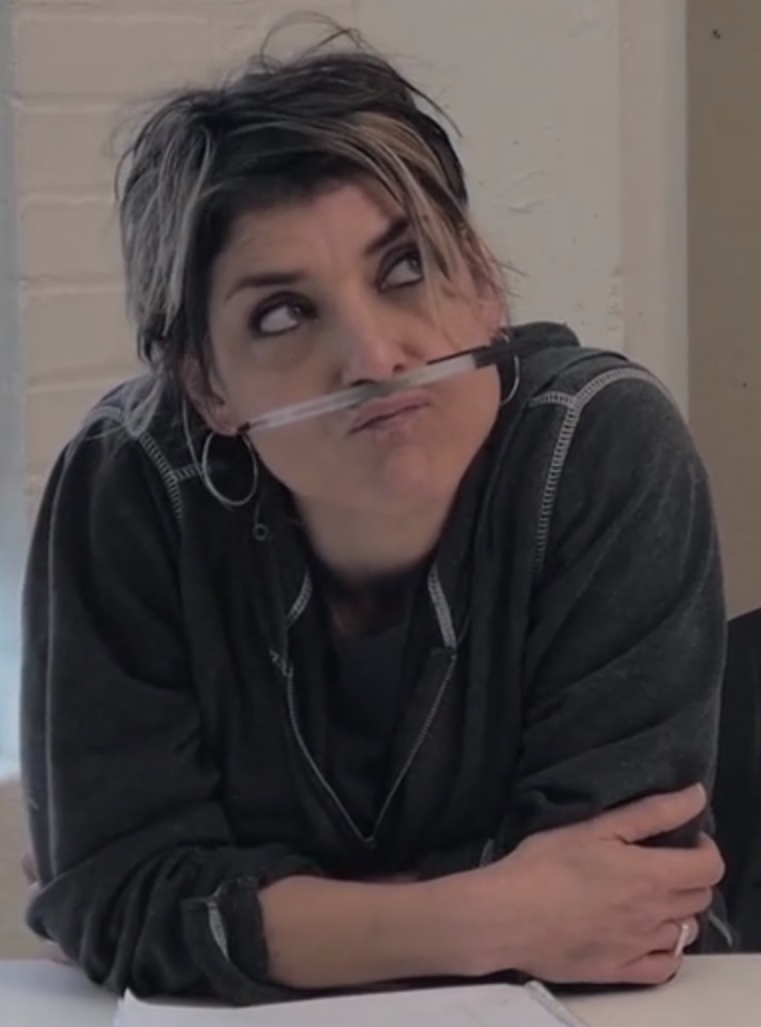
- Forney in 2015
- Born: March 8, 1968 (age 58)
- Education: Wesleyan University, (BA)
- Occupations: Cartoonist, author
- Writing career
- Notable works: I was Seven in '75; I Love Led Zepellin, Marbles: Mania, Depression, Michelangelo and Me, Rock Steady: Brilliant Advice From My Bipolar Life
- Website: ellenforney.com

Ellen Forney (born March 8, 1968) is an American cartoonist, educator, and wellness coach. She is known for her autobiographic comics which include I Was Seven in '75; I Love Led Zepellin; and Marbles: Mania, Depression, Michelangelo and Me. She teaches at the Cornish College of the Arts. Her work covers mental illness, political activism, drugs, and the riot grrrl movement. As of 2019, she is based in Seattle, Washington.

== Career ==
Forney received a B.A. degree from Wesleyan University, where she majored in psychology.

In the 1990s, she produced the autobiographical strip I Was Seven in '75, which ran in Seattle's alternative-weekly paper The Stranger. She self-published a collection in 1997 with a Xeric Foundation grant. A complete collection was published as Monkey Food by Fantagraphics in 1999.

In 2006 she published I Love Led Zeppelin, which collected comics she had done for various newspapers and magazines, and included collaborations with Margaret Cho, Kristin Gore, Camille Paglia, and Dan Savage. It was nominated for an Eisner Award as Best Reality-Based Comic. In 2007 she illustrated Sherman Alexie's young-adult novel The Absolutely True Diary of a Part-Time Indian, which won the National Book Award. In 2008 she published Lust which adapted personal ads from The Stranger into illustrated/comics form.

Her graphic memoir Marbles: Mania, Depression, Michelangelo, and Me addressed her experiences with bipolar disorder. Specifically, the memoir deals with how Forney perceives her mental illness in relation to her art, as well as her fears about medication diminishing her creativity. Forney also notes the role mental illness has played in other artists lives, referring to a list of artists and writers with depression as "Club Van Gogh." It was published by Penguin Books' Gotham Books imprint in November 2012, and it was a New York Times Bestseller. Marbles featured prominently in a graphic medicine exhibit that Forney curated for the U.S. National Library of Medicine.

Forney's 2018 book Rock Steady: Brilliant Advice from My Bipolar Life is a graphic self-help guide, published by Fantagraphics. In it, Forney promotes her personal acronym for self-care: SMEDMERTS, which stands for Sleep, Meds, Eat, Doctor, Mindfulness, Exercise, Routine, Tools, Support System.

== Other work ==
Ellen Forney is also the artist responsible for "Crossed Pinkies" and "Walking Fingers", two murals in the Sound Transit Capitol Hill light rail station at Seattle. She also is open for commissions such as portraits, wedding invitations, and tattoo designs. More recently, Forney started offering wellness coaching for those who suffer from bipolar disorder. She also connects with audiences about graphic medicine, health, and comics in frequent speaking engagements.

== Personal life ==
Forney is bisexual. She was diagnosed with Bipolar I disorder in 1998.

== Bibliography ==
- Monkey Food: The Complete "I Was Seven in '75" Collection, Fantagraphic Books (1999).
- I Love Led Zeppelin: Panty-Dropping Comics, Fantagraphics Books (2006).
- Lust: Kinky Online Personal Ads from Seattle's The Stranger, Fantagraphics Books (2008).
- The Absolutely True Diary of a Part-Time Indian, by Sherman Alexie, Art by Ellen Forney, Little Brown (2007).
- Marbles: Mania, Depression, Michelangelo, and Me: A Graphic Memoir, Gotham/Penguin Books (2012).
- Rock Steady: Brilliant Advice From My Bipolar Life, Fantagraphics (2018).

== Awards ==
- 2013: Inkpot Award
- 2013: National Association for the Advancement of Psychoanalysis "Gradiva" winner in Art for Marbles: Mania, Depression, Michelangelo, and Me: A Graphic Memoir
- 2012: Stranger Genius Award winner for Literature
- 2007: National Book Award winner and New York Times Book of the Year for her art in The Absolutely True Diary of a Part-Time Indian

== See also ==
- List of people with bipolar disorder
- List of female comic creators
