= Investment Development Authority of Lebanon =

National promotion agency of Lebanon

Investment Development Authority of Lebanon(IDAL)

Agency overview
- Formed: 1994
- Jurisdiction: Lebanon
- Headquarters: Riad El Solh, Emir Bachir Street, Lazarieh Tower,4th Floor, Beirut
- Employees: 35
- Minister responsible: Presidency of the Council of Ministers
- Website: www.investinlebanon.gov.lb

The Investment Development Authority of Lebanon (IDAL) is the national investment promotion agency of Lebanon. IDAL was established in 1994 with the aim of promoting Lebanon as a key investment destination, and attracting facilitating, and retaining investments in the country. In 2001, Investment Law No.360 was enacted to reinforce the organisation's mission, providing a framework for regulating investment activities in Lebanon, and providing local and foreign investors alike with a range of incentives and business support services. In addition to its role as an investment promotion agency, IDAL is entrusted with the active promotion and marketing of Lebanese exports including but not limited to agricultural and agro-industrial products. IDAL enjoys financial and administrative autonomy and reports to the President of the Council of Ministers who exercises a tutorial authority over it.

== Investment Incentives ==
IDAL provides incentives for investments in key sectors including: Industry, Agriculture, Agro-Industry, Tourism, Information Technology, Technology, Telecommunication, and Media. Two incentive schemes are available:

1. Investment Project by Zone (IPZ) scheme: It is a scheme based on the project’s geographical location, investment size and sector type. It provides investors with fiscal related incentives and work permits. This scheme divides Lebanon into three geographical zones (Zone A, Zone B, Zone C).

2. Package Deal Contract (PDC) scheme: It is a scheme based on the project’s investment size, number of jobs created, and sector type. It provides investors with fiscal and labor related incentives as well as set-up fees reductions. Under this scheme, the investor is bound by a contract with the Lebanese government represented by IDAL.

== Services ==
Apart from granting incentives on investment projects, IDAL in entrusted with the following services:

- Providing economic, commercial, legal, industrial and other information relevant for investment decisions.
- Providing information on economic sectors with investment potential.
- Identifying and promoting investment opportunities in various growth promising sectors.
- Mediating contacts between investors and entrepreneurs to identify potential joint-venture opportunities.
- Granting various types of fiscal exemptions and fees reduction to investment projects as stipulated in Investment Law No. 360.
- Participating in the capital of joint-stock companies in specific fields.
- Facilitating the issuance of permits and licenses required for starting and operating a business through coordinating with corresponding public institutions.
- Providing advice on issues affecting the investment climate in Lebanon.
- Arranging for business meetings with officials from both private and public sectors.
- Providing after-care service for investment projects.

== Board of directors ==
Mr. Nabil Itani, Chairman and General Manager

Mr. Georges Kassab, Vice-President

Mr. Ramzi El-Hafez, Board Member

Mr. Mourched F. Hage Chahine, Board Member

Mr. Wassim G. Audi, Board Member

Mr. Farid N. El Kheshen, Board Member

Mr. Nacib M. Hoteit, Government Commissioner

== Contact ==
Contact Details

== See also ==
- Ministry of Finance
- Ministry of Economy and Trade
- The Central Bank of Lebanon
- Ministry of Tourism
