= Trinidad and Tobago Newsday =

Newspaper

- Trinidad and Tobago Newsday (15 January 2020)
- Type: Daily newspaper
- Owner: Daily News Limited
- Editor: Therese Mills
- Founded: 1993
- Ceased publication: 27 January 2026
- Headquarters: 23A Chacon St. Port of Spain, Trinidad and Tobago
- Website: newsday.co.tt

Newsday Tobago
- Newsday Tobago (5 May 2016)
- Type: Daily newspaper Mondays to Fridays
- Owner: Daily News Limited
- Editor: Sita Bridgemohan
- Founded: 2 November 2015
- Ceased publication: 27 January 2026
- Language: English
- Headquarters: 2A Shirvan Plaza, Shirvan Road, Tobago

Trinidad and Tobago Newsday was a daily newspaper in Trinidad and Tobago. Newsday was the newest of the three daily papers after the Trinidad and Tobago Guardian and the Trinidad and Tobago Express respectively. The newspaper was founded in 1993 by Daniel Chookolingo, Therese Mills became the first editor-in-chief she was the former editor-in-chief of the Guardian. Newsday bills itself as "The People's Newspaper". The week-end edition is known as the Saturday Newsday.

In addition to its main offices at 17-19 Pembroke Street, Port of Spain (formerly at 23A Chacon Street) Port of Spain, the paper maintains a bureau in San Fernando and in Tobago from where they publish the local Tobago edition known as Newsday Tobago. It publishes five times a week from Monday to Friday, with Friday considered the weekend edition.

In 2010, Newsday began printing copies of the USA Today International Edition on its presses. Mills compared her paper with its new American partner, calling them "both young newspapers. ... When Newsday started in 1993, we faced enormous challenges as we threw down the gauntlet to two well-established national dailies. In four years, however, Newsday had become the number one daily newspaper in readership in this country."

In November 2015, the newspaper established the Newsday Tobago with Sita Bridgemohan as editor. Bridgemohan, who has more than 30 years experience as a journalist and editor, is a former editor of both the Sunday Guardian and Sunday Express. She was editor of the Sunday Newsday when she was selected to start the Newsday Tobago. The Newsday Tobago, a five-day-a-week daily newspaper, serves the sister island of Tobago, delivering local news and content to residents.

In 2026, the newspaper ceased all operations after 32 years. The final online edition was published on 27 January 2026, following High Court approval for the company to be wound up.
