= Equitable Tourism Options =

NGO in Bangalore, India

Equitable Tourism Options (EQUATIONS)
- Founded: 1985
- Type: Research, campaign and advocacy non-profit
- Purpose: Impacts of tourism on local communities in India
- Location: Bangalore, India
- Coordinates: 13°0′27.7″N 77°39′11.10″E
- Region served: India
- Website: http://www.equitabletourism.org

Equitable Tourism Options (EQUATIONS) was a research, campaign and advocacy NGO working on social, cultural, economic and environmental impacts of tourism on local communities in India. Their work was directed towards enabling non-exploitative, equitable and sustainable tourism in India. They functioned out of Bangalore, India and were founded in 1985.

== About EQUATIONS ==
This NGO works towards awareness and mitigation of the negative impacts of tourism in India. They primarily provide analysis, initiate campaigns, advocate for law and policy changes, and network with other groups working on the issues of tourism. They rely on their network of grassroots organisations, local communities, activists, researchers, unions and experts to build perspectives from the ground. The work of EQUATIONS can be categorised into six broad themes across regions of India.

=== Child and tourism ===
EQUATIONS is a formal member of End Child Prostitution, Child Pornography and Trafficking of Children for Sexual Purposes - (ECPAT) International. They work closely with ECPAT on the mission to rid tourism of child exploitation. Their main objectives are to advocate for social accountability and responsibility on the protection of children in tourism, encourage collaborative and concerted action to combat the exploitation of children in tourism and influence governments to incorporate child-friendly and gender-sensitive guidelines.

=== Economic impacts and tourism ===
They evaluate the implications of international trade and economic policy on tourism development and consequent impact on local communities. Since the early nineties, they have engaged with the issues of impact of globalisation, trade and investment policies on tourism development.

=== Ecosystems, communities and tourism ===
They examine tourism development from an environmental angle and also linking it to the livelihoods, culture, way of living of communities dependent on natural resources. They believe that tourism development must be environmentally just, respectful of the rights of local communities and sustainable. EQUATIONS uses research grounded in grassroots realities and advocates through networking with the government, the tourism industry, media, other civil society organisations and with communities.

=== Governance, law and tourism ===
They monitor laws and policies and advocates concerns on the unregulated expansion of tourism in violation of rights of local communities and self governance at the grassroots level with various ministries and departments. They also work with communities and individuals to build awareness and capacity towards exercising their rights in relation to tourism planning and implementation in their local region.

=== Women and tourism ===
Their work examines ways in which women can have greater access, control and ownership over livelihoods and natural resources as well as access to the benefits in the context of tourism.

=== Tourism education ===
They engage with students, academics and tourism institutions to build awareness on tourism impacts, encouraging research and welcoming interns. Their attempt is to integrate critical perspectives on the impacts of tourism within tourism curriculum to further understanding of how tourism can be more equitable.

== EQUATIONS vision ==
EQUATIONS envisions a just and equitable world, where all people have the freedom and the right to determine their lives and future. They envision forms of tourism which are non-exploitative, where decision making is democratised, and access to and benefits of tourism are equitably distributed. They believe in the capacity of individuals and communities to actualise their potential for the well-being of society.

== Campaigns and advocacy ==
EQUATIONS initiates campaigns and supports people's struggles, against unjust, undemocratic and unsustainable forms of tourism. They advocate people's concerns with the local, regional and national government. Their advocacy aims for decentralised democracy and that communities should have a decisive voice in the access, control and ownership over their livelihood, natural resources and common resources. They try to ensure people's experiences influences changes in tourism policies.

=== Some of EQUATIONS campaigns and advocacy literature ===
- Tourism Leave Our Coasts Alone! (27 September 2010). On World Tourism Day 2010 they called for a re-examination of the claim that tourism and biodiversity are mutually dependent. Documenting instances of tourism's irresponsible development on the coast, they reiterated the need for stringent regulation to protect coasts and the rights and livelihoods of coastal communities in India.
- Concerns Intensify as Government Proposes to Amend Kerala Tourism (Conservation & Preservation of Areas) Act 2005 (7 July 2010). They expressed concern over the Kerala Government's move to amend the Kerala Tourism (Conservation & Preservation of Areas) Act 2005 through an Ordinance and later by a Bill in the Assembly in June 2010 on the grounds that it will usurp the powers and mandate of local self-governing institutions.
- Scrap the Islands Protection Zone Notification (3 June 2010). This was a campaign expressing their concerns related to the proposed Islands Protection Zone (IPZ) Notification and highlighting the need to make the Coastal Regulation Zone (CRZ) notification even stronger and ensure tourism is regulated in the fragile island ecosystems in India.
- Zones of Contestation - Call for a Moratorium on Mega Resorts (24 February 2009). They demanded an end to the global mega-resort boom to preserve and use wisely land and natural resources to benefit local communities.
- The issue of illegal reclamation of backwaters and Pokkali fields at Kumbalangi village in Kerala taken up by EQUATIONS played its part in getting building permits for resorts at Kumbalangi, Kerala cancelled.

== Recent publications ==
EQUATIONS provides access to all their publications.

2010

- Humanity-Equality-Destiny? - Implicating Tourism in the Commonwealth Games 2010 (July 2010)
- Envisioning Tourism in India (June 2010)

2009

- The Challenge and Prospects of Tourism in Goa Today (November 2009) and Claiming the Right to Say No (November 2009)
- Nature, Markets, Tourism - Exploring Tourism's claims to Conservation in India (July 2009)
- Making a Difference - Dossier on Community Engagement on Nature Based Tourism in India (May 2009)
- Coastal Regulation in India - Why do we need a new Notification? (April 2009)

2008

- Redefining Tourism - Experiences and Insights from Rural Tourism Projects in India (November 2008) and Sustainability in Tourism - A Rural Tourism Model - A Review Report (September 2008)
- Rethink Tourism in the Andamans - Research Report (June 2008)
- Unholy Nexus: Male Child Sexual Exploitation in Pilgrim Tourism Sites in India (June 2008)
- IFIs and Tourism: Perspectives and Debates (March 2008)
- Public Purpose: How the Tourist Destination of Tomorrow continues to Dispossess the Adivasis of Narmada today (March 2008)
- Right To Information And Tourism (March 2008)
- Rights of the Child in the Context of Tourism (March 2008)
- Impacts Of The Proposed Himalayan Ski Village Project In Kullu, Himachal Pradesh (March 2008)
