= David Shenton =

British cartoonist

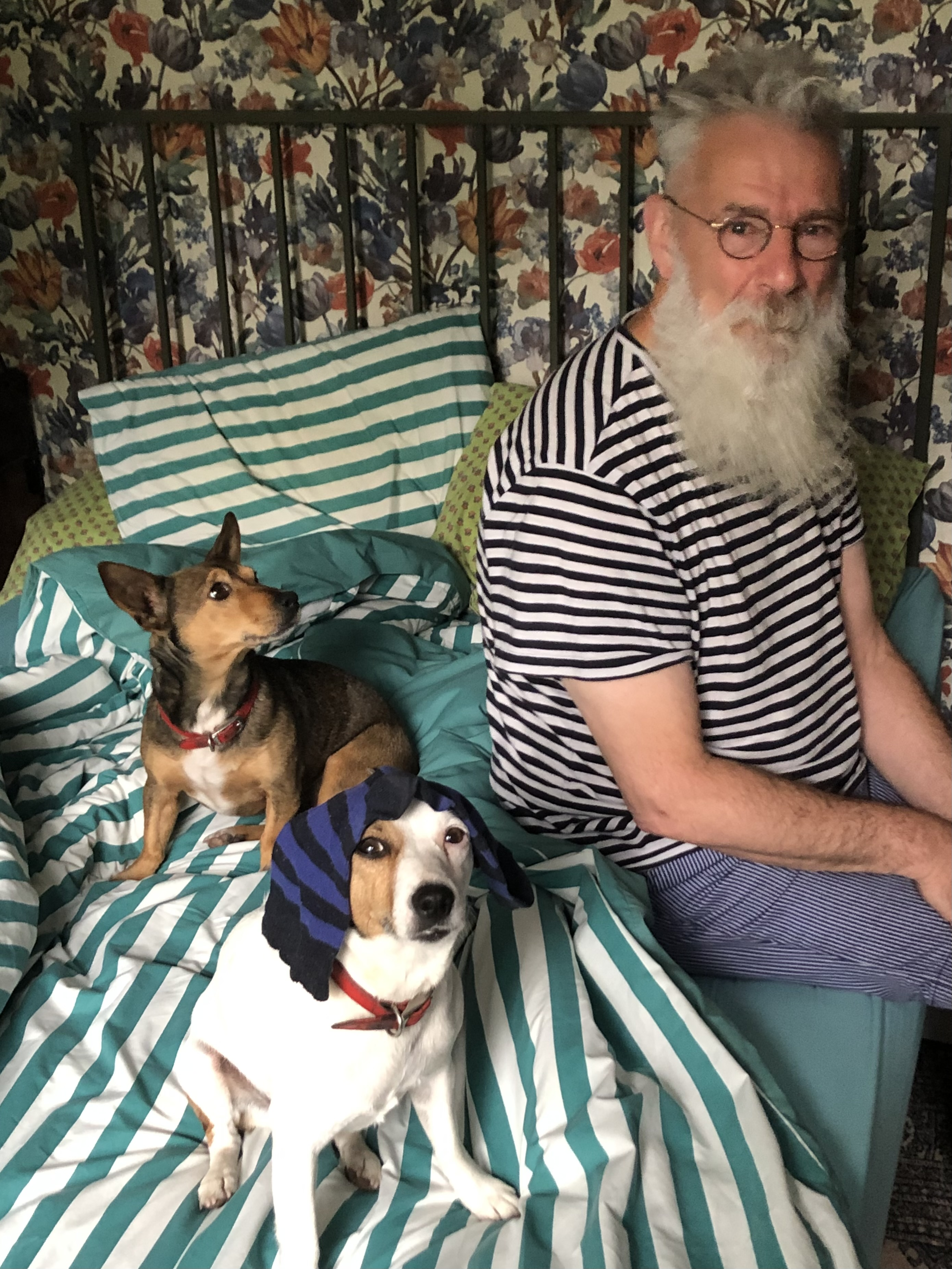
- Shenton sitting on a bed with his dogs
- Born: May 20, 1949 (age 77); Ashton-under-Lyne, Lancashire
- Education: Leeds University
- Occupation: Cartoonist
- Years active: 1970s–present

David Shenton (born May 20, 1949) is a British artist and cartoonist who specializes in queer comics. His work has addressed LGBTQ-related social issues including same-sex marriage, the AIDS crisis, and Section 28. His comic strips have been featured in the collections Strips Aids, No Straight Lines, and AARGH, his strips have been published most prominently in The Guardian and Gay News, and his more recent non-comics work has appeared in Sheringham Museum and the Cartoon Museum.

== Early life ==
Shenton was born on 20 May 1949, in Ashton-under-Lyne, Lancashire. He was taught to knit by his grandmother at age five, though his father was opposed to the hobby and burned these first creations. Shenton went to Ashton-under-Lyne Grammar School from 1960. He has stated that he knew he was gay at 14 years of age. In 1965, he moved to Ashton-under-Lyne College of Further Education and in 1967 he studied printed textiles at Loughborough College of Art. He received his teaching certificate at Leeds University in 1971.

== Career ==
Shenton has been an illustrator of LGBTQ comics since the 1970s. His work was published in the gay press in general from 1976, and began to appear in the publication Gay News in 1981. This was followed by appearances in Him and Capital Gay. Sina Shamsavari has stated that Shenton was likely the most prominent gay cartoonist in the 1980s, with Kate Charlesworth being his lesbian equivalent. His book Stanley and The Mask of Mystery was published in 1983 by Gay Men's Press. Over the course of the 1980s and 1990s, three of Shenton's close friends were killed by HIV/AIDS, prompting him to create a one of his most personal comics about visiting them in hospital. Shenton's work appeared in The Guardian in 1998 with the strip "The ScAvengers", a parody of the TV series The Avengers featuring pigeons.

Shenton's work also appeared in Building Design, Solicitors Journal, Disability Now, and Optician. In addition to his art career, Shenton has taught literacy at Norwich Prison, Hackney College, and the Education Department of the London Zoo. Shenton is involved in LGBTQ+ meetings, marches, and events in London and Norwich. As of 2013 he is a patron of Norwich Pride and Norwich Arts Centre, was publishing his comics through Facebook, and continued to volunteer at London Zoo. Shenton created a "Duvet of Love" in 2020, made up of his own badge collection which he had amassed from the 1970s onward. For February 2020, in celebration of the 40th anniversary of Norwich City F.C. footballer Justin Fashanu's Goal of the Season against Liverpool, Shenton designed a large banner with Proud Canaries. Fashanu was the first professional footballer to come out as gay. In June 2023, Sheringham Museum unveiled a large bearded puppet wearing a 1.72-metre (5.6 ft; 68 in) gansey, both designed by Shenton. The gansey featured 22 motifs including a lavender rhino, bisexuality symbol, trans rights unicorn, and Progress Pride flag. In 2024, Shenton founded a Men's Knitting Group in Norwich, which meets in the city's Millennium Library. This was praised by the UK Hand Knitting Association as "special". In 2025, one of his works depicting his cat was featured in the Cartoon Museum as part of its Cats in Cartoons exhibition.

== Artistry ==
Shenton's work has addressed LGBTQ-related social issues including same-sex marriage, the AIDS crisis, and Section 28. A central character of his cartoons has been Stanley, a mustachioed gay man who had his heyday in the 1980s.

== Bibliography ==
=== Publications ===
- Shenton, David. Stanley and the Mask of Mystery. Gay Men's Press, 1983.
- Shenton, David. Salomé. Text by Oscar Wilde. Quartet Books, 1986.
- Shenton, David. Phobia Phobia. Third House, 1988.
- Shenton, David. Bananas Are Not the Only Fruit. Stonewall Press, 1993.
- Shenton, David. Windows. Fat Chance Books, 1997.
- Shenton, David. Get Her! Dscomics.uk, 2008.
- Charlesworth, Kate. Shenton, David. Drawn Out & Painted Pink. Cath Tate Cards, 2009.
- Shenton, David. Forty Lies. Knockabout, 2023.

=== Contributions ===
- AARGH! Mad Love, 1988.
- Hall, Justin. No Straight Lines: Four Decades of Queer Comics. Fantagraphics Books, 2013.
- Melia, D. Strip AIDS. Willyprods/Small Time Ink, 1987.

== Personal life ==
Shenton has stated that he and his partner registered as partners under Ken Livingstone, then later became civil partners. Later, David and John finally married. John regularly appears in Shenton's work published on Facebook.
