= Haxtur Award =

Spanish comic book award

The Haxtur Award (Premios Haxtur) is a Spanish award for comics created in 1975 by the Asturian comic magazine El Wendigo. It is awarded annually at the Salón Internacional del Cómic del Principado de Asturias (International Comics Convention of the Principality of Asturias). It takes its name from the heroic fantasy comics character of the same name created by Spanish artist Víctor de la Fuente.

== Award categories ==
Awards are made in several categories:

- Mejor Historia Larga (Best Long Story), also known as Mejor Historieta Larga (Best Long Comic)
- Mejor Historia Corta (Best Short Story), also known as Mejor Historieta Corta (Best Short Comic)
- Mejor Guión (Best Script)
- Mejor Dibujo (Best Drawing)
- Mejor Portada (Best Cover, since 1989)
- Mejor Editorial (Best Publisher, every 5–10 years since 1997)
- Haxtur al Humor (Haxtur for Humor, since 2000)
- Autor que Amamos (Author That We Loved, homenaje a la carrera de algún prestigioso creador; added in 1986)
- Finalista más Votado (Finalist with the Most Votes, since 1990)
- Special John Buscema Award (awarded in 2002 and 2004)

== Best Long Comic Strip ==
- 1985: Camelot 3000, by Mike W. Barr and Brian Bolland (Ed. Zinco)
- 1986: Dreadstar, by Jim Starlin (Ed. Fórum)
- 1987: Batman: The Dark Knight Returns, by Frank Miller, Klaus Janson, and Lynn Varley (Ed. Zinco)
- 1988: Watchmen, by Alan Moore and Dave Gibbons (Ed. Zinco)
- 1989: Wonder Woman, by George Pérez
- 1990: Cinder & Ashe, by Gerry Conway and José Luis García-López (Ed. Zinco)
- 1991: Hawkworld, by Timothy Truman (Ed. Zinco)
- 1992: Les Tours de Bois-Maury, by Hermann Huppen (Ed. Norma)
- 1993: Eva Medusa, by Antonio Segura and Ana Miralles (Ed. Glanat)
- 1994: La cró de Leodegundo ("The Chronicle of Leodegundo"), by Gaspar Meana (Ed. El Pexe)
- 1995: Dropsie Avenue, by Will Eisner (Ed. Norma)
- 1996: Largo Winch #5-6, by Jean Van Hamme and Philippe Francq (Ed. Grijalbo)
- 1997: Preacher #1/2, by Garth Ennis and Steve Dillon (Ed. Zinco)
- 1998: The Black Dragon, by Chris Claremont and John Bolton (Ed. Planeta DeAgostini)
- 1999: The Tale of One Bad Rat, by Bryan Talbot (Ed. Planeta)
- 2000: Adolf, by Osamu Tezuka (Ed. Planeta DeAgostini)
- 2001: The Crowned Heart, by Alejandro Jodorowsky and Jean Giraud (Ed. Norma)
- 2002: A Journal of My Father, by Jiro Taniguchi (Ed. Planeta DeAgostini)
- 2003: Usagi Yojimbo: The Dragon Below Conspiracy, by Stan Sakai (Ed. Planeta DeAgostini)
- 2004: Monster, by Naoki Urasawa (Ed. Planeta DeAgostini)
- 2005: A History of Violence, by John Wagner and Vince Locke (Astiberri)
- 2006: Yajiro Togane. Asa el ejecutor nº 5, by Kazuo Koike and Goseki Kojima (Planeta DeAgostini)
- 2007 (Ex aequo): Usagi Yojimbo: Duelo en Kitanoji, by Stan Sakai (Planeta DeAgostini) and "Lobo", El Rey, by Yoshiharu Imaizumi and Jiro Taniguchi (Ponent Mon)
- 2008: Elric, by Michael Moorcock and Walter Simonson (Planeta DeAgostini)
- 2009: El Gavilán (Primer ciclo), by Patrice Pellerin (IO Edicions)
- 2010: Alicia en Sunderland, by Bryan Talbot (Random House Mondadori)
- 2011: Polina, by Bastien Vivès (Diábolo Ediciones)
- 2012: El bosque de los suicidas, by El Torres and Gabriel Hernández (Dib-Buks)
- 2013 (Ex aequo): Tex: Sangre en Colorado, by Claudio Nizzi and Ivo Milazzo (Editorial Aleta) and Tex: El gran robo, by Claudio Nizzi and José Ortiz (Editorial Aleta)
- 2014 (Ex aequo): La propiedad, by Rutu Modan (Ediciones Sins Entido) and Tex: Colorado Bell, by Mauro Boselli and Alfonso Font (Editorial Aleta)
- 2015: El Cantar de Teudan; Tomos I y II, by Gaspar Meana (Editorial UIB)

== Best Short Comic Strip ==
- 1985: "Primer amor" {First Love}, by Carlos Giménez, in Ilustración+Comix Internacional #45 (Ed. Toutain)
  - "Aventura Amorosa en el metro" {Adventures in Love in the City}, by Will Eisner, in Ilustración+Comix Internacional #45 (Ed. Toutain)
  - "Juegos de azar" {Games of Chance}, by Zentner & Pellejero, in Cairo #32 (Ed. Norma)
  - Viceversa {Vice Versa}, by Jan (Caja de Ahorros de Sevilla)
- 1986: Los Pecados de Cupido {The Sins of Cupido}, by J. Zentner & R. Pellejero (Ed. Norma)
  - Daredevil, by Dennis O'Neil & David Mazzucchelli (Ed. Fórum)
  - "Llegada [Arrival]", by Jim Shooter, Al Milgrom, & Steve Leialoha, in Secret Wars #13 (Ed. Fórum)
  - El rubí de Abu Talib Halim {The Ruby of Abu Talib Halim}, by J.L. Cruces, in Cairo #46 (Ed. Norma)
- 1987: Barcelona 1992, by Montesol (Ed. Norma)
  - "Fantasmas" {Ghosts}, by John Byrne & Dick Giordano, in Superman #5 (Ed. Zinco)
  - "Esclara de vecinos" {Stairs of Neighbors}, by Pons, in Historias Completas de El Víbora {Complete Histories of the Vibora} #1 (Ed. La Cúpula)
  - Superman: For the Man Who Has Everything, by Alan Moore & Dave Gibbons (Ed. Zinco)
- 1988: Macao, by Mique Beltrán (Ed. Norma)
  - "Metrópolis 900 Mi.", by John Byrne, in Superman #23 (Ed. Zinco)
  - En clase de religion {In Class of Religion}, by Mediavilla (El Víbora; La Cúpula)
  - "El valle de la luna azul" {The Valley of the Blue Moon}, by A. Buylla, in El Wendigo #42
- 1989: "La rosa de Abisinia" {The Abyssinian Rose}, by V. Mora & Víctor de la Fuente, in Gran Aventurero #1 (Ediciones B)
  - "Chiaroscuro", by Ann Nocenti & David Mazzucchelli, in Patrulla X Especial Verano [X-Men Summer Special] (Ed. Fórum)
  - Como la vez del jamón ("Like the Time of Jamón"), by Giancarlo Berardi & Ivo Milazzo (Ed. Norma)
  - El todopoderoso ("The Almighty"), by Pons, César, & Galiano (El Víbora; La Cúpula)
- 1990: La sangre del volcán ("The Blood of the Volcano"), by Alfonso Font (Ed. Norma)
  - "El jefe [The Head]", by Dave Gibbons, in Cimoc #110 (Ed. Norma)
  - "Cien Millones muerte incluida" [The Million Dollar Hit], by Leonard Starr & Stan Drake, in Gran Aventurero #11 (Ediciones B)
  - "Las lágrimas de Tjahzi" {The Tjahzi Tears}, by Jean van Hamme & Grzegorz Rosinski, in Cimoc #110 (Ed. Norma)
- 1991: Mechanics, by Jaime Hernandez (Ed. La Cúpula)
  - Bianco Natale (Tom's Bar), by Birardi & Milazzo (Ed. Toutain)
  - "Sabor a menta" {Flavor to Mint}, by Carlos Giménez, in Totem el Comix #53 (Ed. Toutain)
  - Loba {She-Wolf}, by Jean van Hamme & Grzegorz Rosinski (Ed. Norma)
- 1992: "El Santo Maldito" ("The Bloody Saint"), by Jamie Delano & Bryan Talbot, in Hellblazer #1 (Ed. Zinco)
  - "Dream of a Thousand Cats", by Neil Gaiman & Kelley Jones, in Sandman #11 (Ed. Zinco)
  - Abraham Stone, by Joe Kubert (Ed. Norma)
  - "Encuentro Nocturno" {Nocturnal Encounter}, by Daniel Torres, in Cimoc #136 (Ed. Norma)
- 1993: "Seasons of Mists Part 4", by Neil Gaiman & Matt Wagner, in Sandman #18 (Ed. Zinco)
  - "Secrets from the Surfer’s Past", by Jim Starlin, in Silver Surfer #12 (Ed Fórum)
  - El ladrón de almas {The Thief of Souls}, by Alfons Font (Ed. Norma)
  - "Violador" {Rapist}, by Carlos Giménez, in Comix Internacional #5 (Ed. Zinco)
- 1994: "Gon Lives with the Penguins", by Masashi Tanaka, in Gon #2 [Gon Again] (Ed. La Cúpula)
  - Dolar de muelas (Cochina Publicidad) {Dolar of Teeth (Dirty Publicity), by Daniel Solana (Ed. Publicaciones Profesionales S.A.)
  - Discovering America, by Dave Mazzucchelli (Ed. F.M.C. Gijón)
  - Harry la cabeza {Harry the Head}, by Brian Bolland (Ed. Norma)
- 1995: Batman: Mad Love, by Paul Dini & Bruce Timm (Ed. Zinco)
  - Hombre Grande {Big Man}, by David Mazzucchelli (El Wendigo)
  - Daredevil/Black Widow: Abattoir, by Jim Starlin & Joe Chiodo (Ed. Fórum)
  - El Círculo del poder {The Circles of Power}, by Pierre Christin & Jean-Claude Mézières (Ed. Grijalbo)
- 1996: "Volver a casa" [Homecoming], by Dennis O'Neil & Rick Burchett, in Las crónicas de Batman #1 {The Batman Chronicles} #1 (Ed. Zinco)
  - Superman: Kal, by Dave Gibbons & José L. García López (Ed. Zinco)
  - Conan: El Depredador [Conan: The Predator], by Don Kraar & John Severin (Ed. Fórum)
  - "Los padres de Valerie" {Valerie's Parents}, by Peter Bagge, in Hate #2 (Ed. La Cúpula)
- 1997: La quimera del oro {The Gold Chimera}, by Don Rosa (Ediciones B)
  - "Petty Crimes", by Howard Chaykin, in Batman Black & White #1 (Ed. Zinco)
  - "Two of a Kind", by Bruce Timm, in Batman Black & White #1 {Ed. Zinco}
  - "Felicidad tamañ familiar" [Great Familiar Happiness], by Rumiko Takahashi, in La tragedia de P [The tragedy of P] (Ed. Planeta de Agostini)
- 1998: Hellblazer: Confession, by Garth Ennis & Steve Dillon (Ed. Norma)
  - Vampire Boy, by Carlos Trillo & Eduardo Risso (Ed. Meridiana-Glenat)
  - Preacher: Cry Blood, Cry Erin, by Garth Ennis & Steve Dillon (Ed. Norma)
  - Hulk: La muerte de Brian Banne [Hulk: The Death of Bruce Banner], by Peter David & A. Kubert (Ed. Fórum)
- 1999: Usagi Yojimbo: Daisho, by Stan Sakai {Ed. Planet}
  - Preacher: Blood & Whiskey, by Garth Ennis & Steve Dillon (Ed. Norma)
  - Louder than Words, by Sergio Aragonés (Ed. Planeta)
  - ¡A por el imprevisto!, by François Boucq (Ed. Norma)
- 2000: La maquinación Voronov {The Voronov Machination}, by Yves Sente & André Juillard (Ed. Norma)
  - "Cagapoco", in Paracuellos #3, by Carlos Giménez (Ed. Glenat)
  - Heartland, by Garth Ennis & Steve Dillon (Ed. Norma)
  - "Excursión", in Xenozoic Tales #6, by Mark Schultz (Ed. Planeta DeAgostini)
- 2001: Superman for All Seasons: Winter, by Jeph Loeb & Tim Sale (Ed. Norma)
  - "Firmes... ¡Ar!", in Paracuellos #4, by Carlos Giménez (Ed. Glenat)
  - Wild Bill ha muerto {Wild Bill Has Died}, by Hermann (Imágica cómics)
  - "Caricaturas", in Eightball #4, by Daniel Clowes (Ed. La Cúpula)
- 2002 (tie):
- Un anillo de boda especial {A special wedding ring}, by Will Eisner (Ed. Norma)
- The Amazing Spider-Man #36, by J. Michael Straczynski & John Romita, Jr. {Ed. Planeta DeAgostini}
  - "A Dios rogando..." {To God Requesting...}, in Paracuellos #5, by Carlos Giménez (Ed. Glenat)
  - Bois-Maury: Rodrigo, by Hermann (Ed. Norma)
- 2003: "Gentlemen’s Agreement", in Spider-Man's Tangled Web #7, by Bruce Jones, Lee Weeks & Josef Rubinstein {Ed Planeta DeAgostini}
  - "Plagiarism", Greyshirt: Indigo Sunset, by Rick Veitch & Russ Heath {Ed. Planeta DeAgostini}
  - A Bitch Is Born, by Roberta Gregory {Recerca-Alecta Editorial}
  - "Conversation", in Amazing Spider-Man V2#38 {Ed. Planeta DeAgostini}
- 2004: Lone Wolf and Cub #4, Kazuo Koike and Goseki Kojima (Ed. Planet deAgostini)
  - Thorgal. The Barbarian, Jean Van Hamme & Grzegorz Roskinski (Ed. Norma)
  - Usagi Yojimbo: Circles, Stan Sakai (Ed. Planeta DeAgostini)
  - Lone Wolf and Cub #2, Kazuo Koike and Goseki Kojima (Ed. Planeta DeAgostini)
- 2005: The Elm Tree of the Caucasus, Utsumi and Taniguich {Ponent Mon}
  - Pumori (k), Tosaki and Tanighuchi {Otaukuland}
  - Thorgal: Kriss de Valnor, Grzegorz Rosinski and Jean Van Hamme {Ed. Norma}
  - "The Courtesan", in Usagi Yojimbo: Shades of Grey, Stan Sakai {Ed. Planeta DeAgostini}
- 2006: Amor de juventud/Tim Sale. Solo, Diana Schutz and Tim Sale {Planeta deAgostini}
  - Regaliz/ Barrio 3, Carlos Giménez {Glénat}
  - Prólogo (Usagi Yojimbo. Segadora 3), Stan Sakai {Planeta deAgostini}
  - "Mala Suki/Modesty Blaise nº 4", Peter O'Donnell and Jim Holdaway {Planeta deAgostini }

== Best Script ==
- 1985: Giancarlo Berardi, for "Las Crías", in Cimoc Extra 4: Especial Aventuras (Ed. Norma)
  - Mike W. Barr, for Camelot 3000 (Ed. Zinco)
  - Carlos Giménez, for "Primer amor" {First Love}, in Ilustración+Comix Internacional #45 (Ed. Toutain)
  - Tom DeFalco & Barry Windsor-Smith, for Machine Man (Ed. Fórum)
- 1986: Walt Simonson, for Thor: The Sutur Sata {Ed. Fórum}
  - John Byrne, for Alpha Flight (Ed. Fórum)
  - Sánchez Abulí, for Torpedo 1936 (Ed. Toutain & Ed. Fórum)
  - Jim Starlin, for Dreadstar (Ed. Fórum)
- 1987: Frank Miller, for Batman: The Dark Knight Returns (Ed. Zinco)
  - Daniel Torres, for La estrella lejana {The Distant Star} (Ed. Norma)
  - Alan Moore, for Superman: For The Man Who Has Everything (Ed. Zinco)
  - Pons, for "Esclara de vecinos" {Stairs of Neighbors}, in Historias Completas de El Víbora {Complete Histories of The Vibora} #1 (Ed. La Cúpula)
- 1988: John Byrne, for "Metrópolis 900 Mi.", in Superman #23 (Ed. Zinco)
  - Beto Hernandez, for "Pasión en la frontera" {Passion in the Border}, in Historias Completas de El Víbora {Complete Histories of the Viper} (Ed. La Cúpula)
  - Alan Moore, for Watchmen (Ed. Zinco)
  - A. Buylla, for "El valle de la luna azul" {The Valley of the Blue Moon}, in El Wendigo #42
- 1989: Alan Moore, for "La Maldición" {The Curse}, in La cosa del pantano #5 Swamp Thing #5} (Ed. Zinco)
  - Mike Baron, for Nexus (Ediciones B)
  - Giancarlo Berardi, for Como la vez del jamón {Like the Time of Jamón} (Ed. Norma)
  - Dennis O'Neil, for "Santa Prisca" & "Transformation", in Question #10-11 (Ed. Zinco)
- 1990: Jean van Hamme, for XIII (Ed. Grijalbo)
  - Walter Simonson, for "La canción de Mjolnir" {The Song of Mjolnir}, in Marvel Two-in-One #62 (Ed. Fórum)
  - Grant Morrison, for Animal Man (Ed. Zinco)
  - Dennis O'Neil, for "The Plastic Dilemma", in Question #19 (Ed. Zinco)
- 1991: Carlos Giménez, for "Sabor a menta" {Flavor to Mint}, in Totem el Comix #53 (Ed. Toutain)
  - Jean van Hamme, for XIII: The Night of 3 August (Ed. Gijalbo)
  - Andrew Helfer, for Justice, Inc. (Ed. Zinco)
  - Alan Moore, for La cosa del pantano {Swamp Thing} #1-5 (Ed. Zinco)
- 1992: Jim Starlin, for Silver Surfer #1-5 (Ed. Fórum)
  - Peter David, for The Atlantis Chronicles (Ed. Zinco)
  - Neil Gaiman, for "Collectors", in Sandman #7 (Ed. Zinco)
  - Jean van Hamme, for Largo Winch #1-2 (Ed. Grijalbo)
- 1993: Antonio Segura, for Eva Medusa (Ed. Glénat)
  - Jim Starlin, for "Secrets from the Surfer’s Past", in Silver Surfer #12 (Ed. Fórum)
  - Frank Miller, for "Sin City", in Cimoc #134-148 (Ed. Norma)
  - Alfons Font, for El ladrón de almas {The Thief of Souls} (Ed. Norma)
- 1994: Neil Gaiman, for Death: The High Cost of Living (Ed. Zinco)
  - Gaspar Meana, for La cró de Leodegundo {The Chronicle of Leodegundo} (Ed. El Pexe)
  - Jean van Hamme, for Largo Winch #3-4 (Ed. Grijalbo)
  - Alejandro Jodorowski, for El Lama blanco {The White Lama} (Ed. Norma)
- 1995: Neil Gaiman, for The Children's Crusade (Ed. Zinco)
  - Will Eisner, for Dropsie Avenue (Ed. Norma)
  - David Mazzucchelli, for Big Man (Ed. El Wendigo)
  - Satoshi Kon, for Regreso al mar {Return to the Sea} (Ed. Planeta de Agostini)
- 1996: Peter David, for "Para que la oscuridad no nos alcance" [So That the Dark Does Not Reach Us], in Hulk: The Fall of the Pantheon (Ed. Fórum)
  - Peter Bagge, for Hate #2 (Ed. La Cúpula)
  - Jean van Hamme, for Largo Winch #5-6 (Ed. Grijalbo)
  - Jamie Delano, for Manbat (Ed. Zinco)
- 1997: Garth Ennis, for Preacher #1/2 (Ed. Zinco)
  - Daniel Torres, for El Octavo día II {Eighth Day II} (Ed. Norma)
  - Neil Gaiman, for Death: The Time of Your Life (Ed. Norma)
  - Terry Laban, for The Dreaming: The Goldie Factor (Ed. Norma)
- 1998: Bryan Talbot, for The Dreaming: Weird Romance (Ed. Norma)
  - Yslaire, for Sambre (Ed. Glénat)
  - Chris Claremont, for The Black Dragon (Ed. Planeta de Agostini)
  - Patrick Cothias, for El viento de los Dioses {The Wind of the Gods} (Ed. Glénat)
- 1999: Mike Richardson and Randy Stradley, for Star Wars: Crimson Empire (Ed. Norma)
  - Garth Ennis, for Preacher: Blood & Whiskey (Ed. Norma)
  - Stan Sakai, for Usagi Yojimgo: Daisho (Ed. Planeta)
  - Bryan Talbot, for The Tale of One Bad Rat (Ed. Planeta)
- 2000: Stan Sakai, for Usagi Yojimbo: Grasscutter (Ed. Planeta DeAgostini)
  - Garth Ennis, for Predicador: Salvación {Preacher: Salvation} (Ed. Norma)
  - Osamu Tezuka, for Adolf (Ed. Planeta DeAgostini)
  - Yves Sente, for La maquinación Voronov {The Voronov Machination} (Ed. Norma)
- 2001: Carlos Giménez, for "Firmes... ¡Ar!", in Paracuellos #4 (Ed. Glenat)
  - Alejandro Jodorowsky, for The Crowned Heart (Ed. Norma)
  - Hermann, for Wild Bill ha Muerto {Wild Bill Has Died} (Imágica cómics)
  - Jeph Loeb, for Superman For All Seasons (Ed. Norma)
- 2002: Posy Simmonds, for Gemma Bovery (Ed. Destino)
  - J. Michael Straczynski, for Amazing Spider-Man #36 (Ed. Planeta DeAgostini)
  - Jiro Taniguchi, for The Almanac of My Father (Ed. Planeta DeAgostini)
  - Will Eisner, for Un anillo de boda especial {A Special Wedding Ring} (Ed. Norma)
- 2003: Stan Sakai, for Usagi Yojimbo: The Dragon Below Conspiracy (Ed. Planeta DeAgostini)
  - Will Eisner, for The Rules of the Game (Ed. Norma)
  - Mark Millar & Bryan Hitch, for The Ultimates (Ed. Planeta DeAgostini)
  - Bryan Talbot, for Heart of Empire (Ed. Astiberri)
- 2004: Giancarlo Berardi, for Ken Parker. Hogar Dulce Hogar (Ken Parker: Home Sweet Home) (Ed. Norma)
  - Jean Van Hamme, for Largo Winch. Ver Venecia... Y Morir (To See Venice... and To Die) (Ed. Norma)
  - Naoki Urasawa, for Monster (Ed. Planeta deAgostini)
  - Kazuo Koike, for Lone Wolf and Cub #4, (Ed. Planeta deAgostini)
- 2005: J. M. Straczynski, for Supreme Power (Panini Comics)
  - R. Utsumi, for The Elm Tree of the Caucasus (Ponent Mon)
  - S. Tosaki, for Pumori (k) (Otakuland)
  - John Wagner, for A History of Violence (Astiberri)
- 2006: Peter O'Donnell, for Mala Suki/Modesty Blaise nº 4 (Planeta deAgostini)
  - Kazuo Koike, for Yajiro Togane. Asa el ejecutor nº 5 (Planeta deAgostini)
  - Brian Michael Bendis, for Ultimate Spider-Man (Panini Comics)
  - Diana Schutz, for Amor de juventud/Tim Sale.Solo (Planeta deAgostini)
- 2007: Jean-Charles Kraehn, for Gil St. André Vol.s 6/8 (Glénat)
- 2008: Alfonso Zapico, for Café Budapest (Astiberri)
- 2009: Léo, for Betelgeuse (Planeta de Agostini)
- 2010: D. Z. Mairowitz, for Kafka (La Cúpula)
- 2011: Giancarlo Berardi for Julia (Aleta Ediciones)
- 2012: El Torres for El bosque de los suicidas (Dib-Buks)
- 2013: Jan Strnad for Ragemoor (Norma)
- 2014: Peter Bagge for La mujer rebelde (La Cúpula)
- 2015: Alfonso Zapico for La balada del norte (Editorial Astiberri)

== Best Drawing ==
- 1985: Brian Bolland, for Camelot 3000 (Ed. Zinco)
  - Jan, for Super López (Bruguera), and Viceversa (Caja de Ahorros de Sevilla)
  - Barry Windsor-Smith, for Machine Man (Ed. Fórum)
  - Will Eisner, for "Aventura Amorosa en el metro" (Adventures in Love in the city), in Ilustración+Comix Internacional #45 (Ed. Toutain)
- 1986: Daniel Torres, for Roco Vargas (Ed. Norma)
  - Víctor de la Fuente, for "Los ángeles de acero" (The Street Angels), in Ilustración+Comix #54-57 (Ed. Toutain)
  - John Byrne, for Fantastic Four, and Alpha Flight (Ed. Fórum)
  - Paul Smith, for Uncanny X-Men (Ed. Fórum)
- 1987: David Mazzucchelli, for Batman: Year One (Ed. Zinco), and Daredevil: Born Again (Ed. Fórum)
  - Barry Windsor-Smith, for "Muerta viva" (Lifedeath), in Patrulla X (Uncanny X-Men) (Ed. Fórum)
  - John Byrne, for Superman (Ed. Zinco)
  - Beroy, for Ajeno (Ed. Toutain)
- 1988: Dave Gibbons, for Watchmen (Ed. Zinco)
  - Mique Beltrán, for Macao (Ed. Norma)
  - F. Bourgeon, for Los compañeros del crepúsculo {The Companions of the Twilight} (Ed. Norma)
  - Franco Saudelli, for La Bionda (Ed. Norma)
- 1989: Brian Bolland, for Batman: The Killing Joke (Ed. Zinco)
  - Jean "Moebius" Giraud, for The Incal (Eurocomic)
  - I. Milazzo, for "Tom's Bar", in Totem-El Comix #31 (Ed. Toutain)
  - David Mazzucchelli, for "Chiaroscuro", in Patrulla X Especial Verano {X-Men Summer Special} (Ed. Fórum)
- 1990: Walter Simonson, for "La canción de Mjolnir" {The Song of Mjolnir}, in Marvel Two-in-One #62 (Ed. Fórum)
  - José L. García López, for Deadman, and Cinder and Ashe (Ed. Zinco)
  - Steve Rude, for Nexus (Ediciones B)
  - Jerry Ordway, for Batman El Film {Batman: The Movie} (Ed. Zinco)
- 1991: G. Rosinki, for Loba {She-Wolf} (Ed. Norma)
  - Walter Simonson, for Fantastic Four (Ed. Fórum)
  - Jean "Moebius" Giraud, for La Diosa {The Goddess} (Ed. Norma)
  - Joe Kubert, for Abraham Stone (Ed. Norma)
- 1992: Kevin Maguire, for The Adventures of Captain America (Ed. Fórum)
  - Jaime Hernandez, for Las mujeres perdidas {The Lost Women} (Ed. La Cúpula)
  - Hermann, for "Sigurd (Las Torres de Bois-Maury)" in Cimoc #136-139 (Ed. Norma)
  - Dan Barry, for Indiana Jones and the Fate of Atlantis (Ed. Norma)
- 1993: Georges Bess, for {It Licks Target} (Ed. Norma)
  - Ana Miralles, for Eva Medusa (Ed. Glenat)
  - Joe Quesada & Kevin Nowlan, for Batman: Sword of Azrael (Ed. Zinco)
  - Alan Davis, for Excalibur (Ed. Fórum)
- 1994: Philippe Francq, for Largo Winch #3-4 (Ed. Grijalbo)
  - Gaspar Meana, for La cró de Leodegundo {The Chronicle of Leodegundo} (Ed. El Pexe)
  - Dave Mazzucchelli, for Discovering America (Ed. F.M.C. Gijón)
  - Kevin Maguire, for The New Titans (Ed. Zinco)
- 1995: Jerry Ordway, for The Power of Shazam! (Ed. Zinco)
  - Bruce W. Timm, for Batman: Mad Love (Ed. Zinco)
  - David Mazzucchelli, for Hombre Grande {Big Man} (Ed. El Wendigo)
  - Alex Ross, for Marvels (Ed. Fórum)
- 1996: José L. García López, for Superman: Kal (Ed. Zinco)
  - Rubén Pellejero, for El silencio de Malka {The Silence of Malka} (Ed. Glénat)
  - Alan Davis, for Clandestine {Clan Destine} (Ed. Fórum)
  - François Boucq, for Los diented del tiburón {The Teeth of the Shark} (Ed. Norma)
- 1997: Paul Gulacy, for Batman Versus Predator II (Ed. Zinco)
  - Steve Dillon, for Preacher #1/2 (Ed. Zinco)
  - Daniel Torres, for El Octavo día II {Eighth Day II} (Ed. Norma)
  - Bruce Timm, for "Two of a Kind", in Batman: Black & White #1 (Ed. Zinco)
- 1998: Yslaire, for Sambre (Ed. Glénat)
  - Steve Dillon, for Predicador: Cruzados {Preacher: Crusade} (Ed. Norma)
  - John Bolton, for The Black Dragon (Ed. Planeta de Agostini)
  - Alex Ross, for Kingdom Come (Ed. Vid)
- 1999: Preacher: Dixie Fried, by Steve Dillon (Ed. Norma)
  - The Towers of Bois-Maury #9-10, by Hermann Huppen (Ed. Norma)
  - The Tale of One Bad Rat, by Bryan Talbot (Ed. Planeta)
  - Boy Vampiro: Soy Egipcio {Boy Vampire: I Am Egyptian}, by Eduarto Risso (Ed. Glénat)
- 2000: Mark Schultz, for Xenozoic Tales (Ed. Planeta DeAgostini)
  - Kevin O'Neil, for The League of Extraordinary Gentlemen (Ed. Planeta DeAgostini)
  - Rubén Pellejero, for Tabú {Taboo} (Ed. Glenat)
  - Igor Kordey, for Batman/Tarzan: The Claws of the Catwoman (Ed. Norma)
- 2001: Hermann, for Wild Bill ha muerto {Wild Bill Has Died} (Imágica cómics)
  - Tim Sale, for Superman For All Seasons (Ed. Norma)
  - Juanjo Guarnido, for Blacksad (Ed. Norma)
  - Carlos Giménez, for Paracuellos #4 (Ed. Glenat)
- 2002: Gaspar Meana, for La Infanta, el Pirata y el Niño {The Infant, The Pirate and the Boy} (Ed. VTP)
  - René Pellejero, for Un poco de humo azul {A Little Blue Smoke} (Ed. Glenat)
  - Hermann, for Bois-Maury: Rodrigo (Ed. Norma)
  - John Romita, Jr., for Amazing Spider-Man #36 (Ed. Planeta DeAgostini)
- 2003: Richard Corben, for Cage (Ed. Planeta DeAgostini)
  - Tim Sale, for Batman: Dark Victory {Ed. Norma}
  - Bryan Hitch, for The Ultimates {Ed. Planeta DeAgostini}
  - George Bess, for Juan Solo (Ed. Planeta DeAgostini)
- 2004: Joe Kubert, for Tex: The Solitary Rider (Ed. Planeta DeAgostini)
  - Philippe Franq, for Largo Winch: To See Venice… And To Die (Ed. Norma)
  - John Cassaday, for Batman/Planetary and Captain America (Ed. Planeta DeAgostini)
  - Brian Hitch, for The Ultimates (Ed. Planeta DeAgostini)
- 2005: Igor Kordey, for "Storm: Sand", in Xtreme X-Men (Panini Comics)
  - Lee Weeks, for Captain America #17-20 (Ed. Planeta DeAgostini)
  - Alfonso Font, for {Tex: The Assassins} (Ed. Planeta DeAgostini)
  - Andy Kubert, for Marvel 1602 (Panini Comics)
- 2006: Frank Cho, for Shanna (Panini Comics)
  - Gregorz Rosinski, for La venganza del conde Skarbek (Norma Editorial)
  - Tim Sale, for Una jugada peligrosa/Tim Sale.Solo (Planeta deAgostini)
  - David Lloyd, for Kickback (Planeta deAgostini)

== Author That We Love ==
- 1986: Miguel Ambrosio Zaragoza- Ambros
- 1987: Víctor de la Fuente
- 1988:Eugenio Giner
- 1989: Lee Falk
- 1990:Chiqui de la Fuente
- 1991: Dan Barry
- 1992 (tie):
  - Al Williamson
  - Adolfo Álvarez Buylla
- 1993: Juan G. Iranzo
- 1994: Joe Kubert
- 1995:Will Eisner
- 1996: Roy Thomas
- 1997 (tie):
  - John Buscema
  - Gilbert Shelton
- 1998:Dennis O'Neil
- 1999 (tie):
- Rafael Méndez
- Neal Adams
- 2000 (tie):
  - Ibáñez
  - Quino
- 2001: Jodorowsky
- 2002: Marie Severin
- 2003 (tie):
  - Jordan
  - Moebius
- 2004 (tie):
  - Purita Campos
  - Mordillo
- 2005: Jim Starlin
- 2006: Frank Stack
- 2007: Luis del Olmo
- 2008 (tie):
  - Giancarlo Berardi
  - Michael Kaluta
- 2009: Russ Heath
- 2010: Jose María Blanco Ibarz
- 2011 (tie):
  - Jean-Claude Mezieres
  - Hermann Huper
  - Núria Pompeia
- 2012 (tie):
  - Georges Bess
  - Bruce Jones
- 2013: José Ortiz
- 2014 (tie):
  - Ricardo Martínez,
  - Jordi Bernet
  - Stan Sakai
- 2015 (tie):
  - José Luis García-López
  - Trini Tinturé

== Best Cover ==
- 1989: Totem-El Comix #31 (Ed. Toutain); Aventurero #1 (Ediciones B), by Ivo Milazzo
- 1990: The Greatest Joker Stories Ever Told, by Brian Bolland (Ed. Zinco)
- 1991: Fantastic Four #100 (Interior Cover), by Walter Simonson (Ed. Fórum)
- 1992: Las mejores historias de los años 50 [Greatest 1950s Stories Ever Told], by Joe Kubert (Ed. Zinco)
- 1993: Superman #120, by Jerry Ordway (Ed. Zinco)
- 1994: Aliens: Salvation, by Mike Mignola (Ed. Norma)
- 1995: Marvels #3, by Alex Ross (Ed. Fórum)
- 1996: Star Wars #1, by Art Adams
- 1997: Batman: Dark Allegeiances, by Howard Chaykin
- 1998: "Hellblazer", by Glenn Fabry, in Vértigo #49
- 1999: Aliens: Glass Corridor, by David Lloyd
- 2000: Predicador. Y llegó el infierno #2 (Preacher: All Hell's a-Coming #2)
- 2001: Star Wars: Emissaries to Malastare, by Mark Schultz (Ed. Norma)
- 2002: Juan Solo: Los perros del poder, by Georges Bess
- 2003: Djinn #1, by Ana Miralles
- 2004: Captain America, Hielo 1 parte, (Ice Part 1), by John Cassaday
- 2005: Loki, by Esad Ribic
- 2006: La fórmula/Martin Mystère nº 3, by Giancarlo Alessandrini
- 2007: Clásicos DC: Orion nº 4 by Walter Simonson
- 2008: María y yo, by Miguel Gallardo
- 2009: La Guarida del Horror, by Richard Corben
- 2010: Batman Año 1 nº 3 by David Mazzucchelli
- 2011: Julia nº2 by Marco Soldi
- 2012: Yaxin. El fauno Gabriel by Man Arenas
- 2013: Nuevas aventuras de Diego Valor by Daniel Acuña
- 2014: Daredevil: Dark Nights n° 8, by Amanda Conner
- 2015: Little Nemo, Regreso a Slumberland (Little Nemo, Return to Slumberland) by Gabriel Rodríguez

== Finalist with the most votes ==
- 1989: Batman: The Killing Joke, by Brian Bolland (Ed. Zinco)
- 1990: The Greatest Joker Stories Ever Told, by Brian Bolland (Ed. Zinco)
- 1991: Loba, by Jean van Hamme & G. Rosinki (Ed. Norma)
- 1992: Las Torres de Bois-Maury, by Hermann (Ed. Norma)
- 1993: Eva Medusa, by Antonio Segura & Ana Miralles (Ed. Glanat)
- 1994: Kevin Maguire, for The New Titans (Ed. Zinco)
- 1995: Neil Gaiman, for The Children's Crusade (Ed. Zinco)
- 1996: "Los padres de Valerie" {Valerie's Parents}, by Peter Bagge, in Hate #2 (Ed. La Cúpula)
- 1997: Paul Gulacy, for Batman versus Predator II (Ed. Zinco)
- 1998: Bryan Talbot, for The Dreaming: Weird Romance (Ed. Norma)
- 1999: Preacher: Blood & Whiskey, by Garth Ennis (Ed. Norma)
- 2000: Igor Kordey, for Batman/Tarzán. The Claws of the Catwoman (Ed. Norma)
- 2001: Star Wars: Emissaries to Malastare, by Mark Schultz (Ed. Norma)
- 2002: Bill Watterson, for El último libro de Calvin y Hobbes {The Ultimate Calvin & Hobbes Book} (Ediciones B)
- 2003: Heart of Empire, by Bryan Talbot (Ed. Astiberri)
- 2004: John Cassaday
- 2005: Ricardo
- 2006: Frank Cho

== Best Publisher ==
- 1997 (tie):
- D.C.
- Ed. Zinco

== Humor ==
- 2000: Gallego & Rey
  - Ricardo & Nacho
  - Ventura
  - El Roto
- 2001: El Roto
  - Maitena
  - Bill Watterson
  - Neto
- 2002: Neto, for Nuestros Paisanos (Ed. Madú)
  - Idígoras & Pachi, for Pascual Mayordomo Real (La Esfera)
  - Bill Watterson, for El último libro de Calvin y Hobbes {The Ultimate Calvin & Hobbes Book} (Ediciones B)
  - Ricardo & Nacho, for Goomer
- 2003: Roberta Gregory, for A Bitch Is Born (Ed. Recerca-Alecta)
  - Maitena (RqueR Editorial)
  - Scott Adams, for Dilbert (Ed. Graniaca)
  - Patrick McDonnell, for Mutts (Ed. Devir)
- 2004: Idigoras and Pachi, for {Alicia, governess of Letizia and the vacations of two families} (the World)
  - J. M. DeMatteis and Kevin Maguire, for Formerly Known as the Justice League (Ed. Norma)
  - Patrick McDonnell, for Mutts III (Devir)
  - Jean-Jacques Sempé, for The World of Sempe (Ed. Norma)
- 2005: Ricardo, for Ricardo 2003-2004 (Thursday)
  - R. Roman and P. Garcia, for {The Strip and Relaxes} (The New Spain)
  - Jordi Labanda, (RM)
  - Frank Cho, for Liberty Meadows (Ed. Norma)
- 2006: RAMÓN, (Colpisa)
  - GRANDA, ARTURO ARIAS y ÑATA, for En todas las ocasiones y Más madera (El Comercio)
  - Frank Cho, for Liberty Meadows 6 (La Colla de la pessigolla)
  - PAU, for Pau per tots (Diario de Mallorca)

== Special John Buscema Award ==
- 2002: Trina Robbins
- 2003 Desert
- 2004 (tie):
  - Luis Alberto de Cuenca
  - Carlos Giménez
- 2005: Jim Starlin
- 2006: John Lent
- 2007: Maurice Horn
- 2008: Luis Gasca
- 2010: Gil Parrondo
- 2011: Desierto
- 2012: Instituto Quevedo del Humor de la Universidad Alcalá - Director Tomás Gallego
- 2013 (Ex aequo):
  - Javier Mariscal
  - Frédéric Manzano
- 2014 (ex aequo):
  - Juan José Plans y
  - Quino
