= Sally Heathcote: Suffragette =

2014 graphic novel

- Author: Mary M. Talbot
- Illustrator: Bryan Talbot (pencil); Kate Charlesworth (ink)
- Genre: Graphic novel
- Publisher: Jonathan Cape
- Publication date: May 2014
- ISBN: 978-0-224-09786-4

Sally Heathcote: Suffragette is a 2014 graphic novel about a fictional suffragette by Mary M. Talbot, Kate Charlesworth and Bryan Talbot. In 2015, it was included in a list of the "top 10 books about revolutionaries" published by The Guardian.

== Background ==
Mary M. Talbot and her husband, Bryan Talbot, previously collaborated on the 2012 graphic novel Dotter of Her Father's Eyes. Mary began writing Sally Heathcote: Suffragette as soon as they finished their previous work. Because Bryan was busy working on his graphic novel series Grandville, they brought on Kate Charlesworth to assist with illustrations.

== Reception ==
In a review for The Guardian, James Smart described the book as a "potent mix of hope and brutality" and praised its illustrations. Yo Zushi of the New Statesman felt that it had too much text relative to the images, and that Sally as a fictional character was not as compelling as the historical figures in the book.

== See also ==
- List of feminist comic books
- Portrayal of women in American comics
