= Lucia Joyce =

Irish professional dancer (1907–1982)

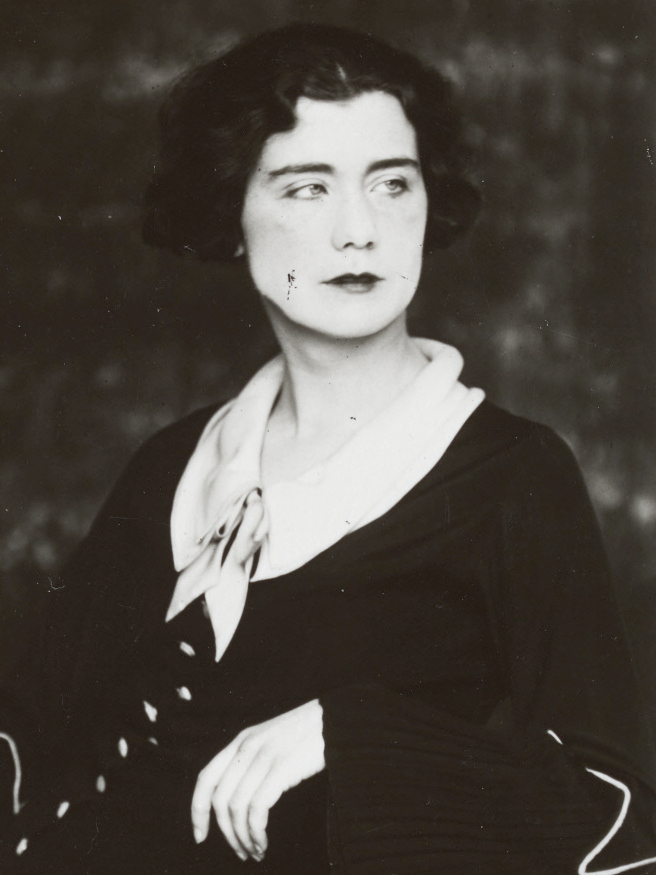
- Joyce c. 1927 in a cropped photograph by Berenice Abbott
- Born: 26 July 1907; Trieste, Austria-Hungary (now Italy)
- Died: 12 December 1982 (aged 75); Northampton, England
- Citizenship: United Kingdom
- Occupation: Ballet dancer
- Parents: James Joyce (father); Nora Barnacle (mother)
- Relatives: Stephen James Joyce (nephew)

Lucia Anna Joyce (26 July 1907 – 12 December 1982) was an Irish professional dancer and the daughter of Irish writer James Joyce and Nora Barnacle. Once treated by Swiss psychiatrist Carl Jung, Joyce was diagnosed as schizophrenic in the mid-1930s and institutionalized at the Burghölzli psychiatric clinic in Zurich. In 1951, she was transferred to St Andrew's Hospital in Northampton, where she remained until her death in 1982. She was the aunt of Stephen James Joyce, who was the last descendant of James Joyce.

== Early life and career ==
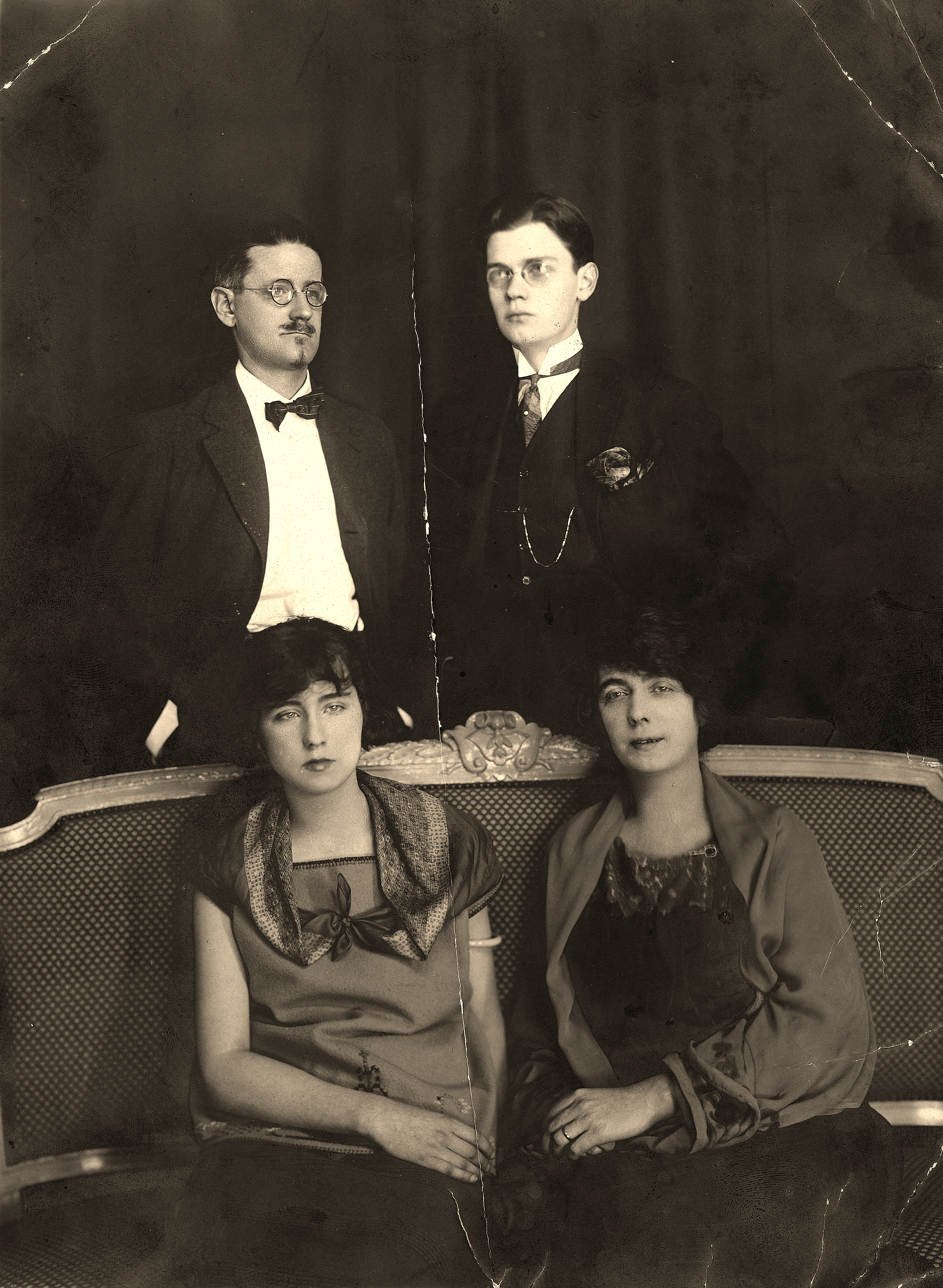
Paris 1924: Clockwise from top left – James Joyce, Giorgio Joyce, Nora Barnacle, Lucia Joyce

Lucia Anna Joyce was born in the Ospedale Civico di Trieste on 26 July 1907. She was the second child of Irish writer James Joyce and his partner (later wife) Nora Barnacle, after her brother Giorgio. As her parents were expatriates living in Trieste, Lucia's first language was Italian. In her younger years, she trained as a dancer at the Dalcroze Institute in Paris. She studied dancing from 1925 to 1929, training first with Jacques Dalcroze, followed by Margaret Morris, and later with Raymond Duncan (brother of Isadora Duncan) at his school near Salzburg. In 1927, Joyce danced a short duet as a toy soldier in Jean Renoir’s film adaptation of Hans Christian Andersen's "La Petite marchande d’allumettes" (The Little Match Girl). She furthered her studies under Lois Hutton, Hélène Vanel, and Jean Börlin, lead dancer of the Ballets suédois.

In 1928, she joined "Les Six de rythme et couleur," a commune of six female dancers that were soon performing at venues in France, Austria, and Germany. After a performance in La Princesse Primitive at the Vieux-Colombier theatre, the Paris Times wrote of her: "Lucia Joyce is her father's daughter. She has James Joyce's enthusiasm, energy, and a not-yet-determined amount of his genius. When she reaches her full capacity for rhythmic dancing, James Joyce may yet be known as his daughter's father."

On 28 May 1929, she was chosen as one of six finalists in the first international festival of dance in Paris held at the Bal Bullier. Although she did not win, the audience, which included her father and the young Samuel Beckett, championed her performance as outstanding and loudly protested the jury's verdict. It has been alleged that when Lucia was 21, she and Beckett (who was her father's secretary for a short time) became lovers. Their relationship lasted only a short while and ended after Beckett, who was involved with another woman at the time, admitted that his interest was actually in a professional relationship with James Joyce, not a personal one with Joyce's daughter.

At the age of 22, Joyce, after years of rigorous dedication and long hours of practice, decided "she was not physically strong enough to be a dancer of any kind". Announcing she would become a teacher, she then "turned down an offer to join a group in Darmstadt and effectively gave up dancing." Her biographer Carol Shloss argues that it was her father who finally put an end to her dancing career. James reasoned that the intense physical training for ballet caused her undue stress, which in turn exacerbated the long-standing animosity between her and her mother Nora. The resulting incessant domestic squabbles prevented work on Finnegans Wake. James convinced her she should turn to drawing lettrines to illustrate his prose and forgo her deep-seated artistic inclinations. To his patron Harriet Shaw Weaver, James Joyce wrote that this resulted in "a month of tears as she thinks she has thrown away three or four years of hard work and is sacrificing a talent".

== Mental illness and later life ==
Lucia Joyce started to show signs of mental illness in 1930, including a time period during which she was involved with Samuel Beckett, then a junior lecturer in English at the École normale supérieure in Paris. In May 1930, while her parents were in Zurich, she invited Beckett to dinner, hoping "to press him into some kind of declaration." He flatly rejected her, explaining that he was only interested in her father and his writing.

By 1934, she had participated in several affairs, with her drawing teacher Alexander Calder, another expatriate artist Albert Hubbell, and Myrsine Moschos, assistant to Sylvia Beach of Shakespeare and Company. As the year wore on, her condition had deteriorated to the point that James had Carl Jung take her in as a patient. Soon after, she was diagnosed with schizophrenia at the Burghölzli psychiatric clinic in Zurich. In 1936, James consented to have his daughter undergo blood tests at St Andrew's Hospital in Northampton. After a short stay, Lucia Joyce insisted she return to Paris, the doctors explaining to her father that she could not be prevented from doing so unless he had her committed. James told his closest friends that "he would never agree to his daughter being incarcerated among the English."

Lucia Joyce returned to stay with Maria Jolas, the wife of transition editor Eugene Jolas, in Neuilly-sur-Seine. After three weeks, her condition worsened and she was taken away in a straitjacket to the Maison de Santé Velpeau in Vésinet. Considered a danger to both staff and inmates, she was left in isolation. Two months later, she entered the maison de santé of François Achille Delmas at Ivry-sur-Seine.

In 1951, Joyce was transferred back to St Andrew's Hospital. Over the years, she received visits from Beckett, Sylvia Beach, Frank Budgen, Maria Jolas, and Harriet Shaw Weaver who acted as her guardian. Her cousin, Bozena Delimata, with whom she had lived in Dublin in 1936, would write in 1980 that her condition had vastly improved and that the two maintained a regular correspondence. In 1962, Beckett donated his share of the royalties from his 1929 contributory essay on Finnegans Wake in Our Exagmination Round His Factification for Incamination of Work in Progress to help pay for her confinement at St Andrew's.

In 1982, Lucia Joyce had a stroke and died on 12 December. She is buried in Kingsthorpe Cemetery. Each year on Bloomsday (16 June), extracts from James Joyce's Ulysses and other readings related to his life and works are read at Lucia Anna Joyce's graveside. In 2018 on Bloomsday, Letters to Lucia, a play written by Richard Rose and James Vollmar in which characters from Lucia's life, including Samuel Beckett, Kathleen Neel, Nora Barnacle/Joyce and Joyce himself appear, was performed by the Triskellion Irish Theatre Company at the graveside.

== Legacy ==
Her mental state, and documentation related to it, is the subject of a 2003 study, Lucia Joyce: To Dance in the Wake, by Carol Loeb Shloss, who believes Lucia Joyce to have been her father's muse for Finnegans Wake. Making heavy reference to the letters between Joyce and her father, the study became the subject of a copyright misuse suit by the James Joyce estate. On 25 March 2007, this litigation was resolved in Shloss's favour.

Professor John McCourt, of the University of Macerata, a prize-winning Joyce scholar, trustee of the International James Joyce Foundation, and co-founder and director of the International James Joyce symposium held at Trieste, wrote in A Companion to Literary Biography (ed. Robert Bradford, Wiley Blackwell, 2019) that Shloss, in her "sometimes obsessive" book, "seeks very deliberately to depose Nora (Joyce's wife) as Joyce's chief muse... in doing so, it overplays its hand with exaggerated claims about Lucia's genius and about her importance to Joyce's creative process and vindictively harsh judgments on most members of the Joyce family and circle"; the book's "most damaging legacy is the cottage industry of derivative versions of Lucia that it has helped to spawn... the key source for a whole series of writings about Lucia that uncomfortably mix fact and fiction" including The Joyce Girl (2016) by Annabel Abbs, of which McCourt wrote "With Abbs, the perverse cycle of interest in Lucia comes full circle. We are back in the territory of fiction fraudulently posing as biography"; he considered the book "a prime contender for the worst Joyce-inspired 'biography' ever". The book was also the subject of criticism in the Irish Times and Irish Examiner regarding the author's "unsubstantiated speculations" regarding incest between Lucia and her brother, and the sources of her mental illness.

In 1988, Stephen Joyce had all the letters written by Lucia that he received upon her death in 1982 destroyed. Stephen Joyce stated in a letter to the editor of The New York Times that "Regarding the destroyed correspondence, these were all personal letters from Lucia to us. They were written many years after both Nonno and Nonna [i.e., Mr. and Mrs. Joyce] died and did not refer to them. Also destroyed were some postcards and one telegram from Samuel Beckett to Lucia. This was done at Sam's written request." In 2004, Lucia Joyce's life was the subject of Calico, a West End play written by Michael Hastings, and, in 2012, of the graphic novel Dotter of Her Father's Eyes by Mary and Bryan Talbot. A play exploring her life, titled L, was performed to a limited audience in Concord Academy from 14 to 16 April 2016. It was written and directed by Sophia Ginsburg.

2016 saw the release of Annabel Abbs's biographical novel, The Joyce Girl; in 2018, she was the subject of a novel by Alex Pheby, titled Lucia. Lucia Joyce is the protagonist of the "Round the Bend" chapter of Alan Moore's 2016 novel Jerusalem. Set at the Northampton clinic where she spent her final years, the chapter is written in the style of her father's Finnegans Wake. In 2023, Joseph Chester released Lucia for Guitar & Strings, a suite for classical guitar and strings, commissioned by Axis Ballymun for the centenary celebrations of Ulysses in Dublin. The suite had its world premiere in Dublin on Bloomsday 2023, and was released on CD, vinyl and streaming in January 2023 on Bohemia Records. The suite took eleven key moments, or fragments, from the life of Lucia Joyce to paint a portrait of her in music.

== Collections ==
University College London (UCL) holds archival material about the Joyce family - primarily Lucia Joyce - that was collected by Jane Lidderdale. Lidderdale was Joyce's god-daughter and the executor of her estate. Lidderdale donated the material to UCL between 1974 and 1983. The collection also contains material relating to Harriet Shaw Weaver, patron of Lucia's father James.
