= Dotter of Her Father's Eyes =

2012 graphic novel written by Mary M. Talbot; part-memoir, part biography of Lucia Joyce

- Author: Mary M. Talbot
- Illustrator: Bryan Talbot
- Publisher: Jonathan Cape
- Publication date: 2 Feb 2012
- Media type: Hardback
- ISBN: 0224096087

Dotter of Her Father's Eyes is a 2012 graphic novel written by Mary M. Talbot with artwork by her husband, Bryan Talbot. It is part memoir, and part biography of Lucia Joyce, daughter of modernist writer James Joyce.

== Synopsis ==
Mary Talbot recounts her childhood in Preston, Lancashire, focusing upon her relationship with her father, Joycean scholar James S. Atherton. Talbot became a scholar herself, working in critical discourse analysis and publishing about language and gender.

The book juxtaposes Talbot's childhood with that of Lucia Joyce, the daughter of James Joyce. Inspired by Carol Shloss's 2003 biography of Lucia, it covers her ambitions in dance and her deteriorating mental condition.

== Writing ==
Bryan Talbot reflects on the differences in collaborating with his wife and his normal collaborations with writers. Explaining the process to the Sunderland Echo, Talbot says, "[t]he usual state of affairs is you get a script through the post or by email and that is the end of the collaboration. You illustrate, you design the page and tell the story. But this time, Mary would come down to the studio to watch me work and suggest things. I would suggest changes to the script to make it clearer or to get a point across, then we would discuss it over dinner.” Rather than have Bryan rework the art, Mary identified inaccuracies by inserting footnotes throughout the book.

== Reception ==
The book was largely received positively by critics. Writing for The Observer, Rachel Cooke wrote that "[b]oth narratives are elegantly done. Talbot has a keen eye for the revealing detail, an important skill if you are working in comics. She makes connections, but never labours them." The Telegraph's review was similarly positive, labelling the book: "ambitious, entertaining and perceptive and blends a first-time script from Mary Talbot with stunning drawings and design from her husband, Bryan (Luther Arkwright, Grandville, Alice in Sunderland). It's a small triumph." The book won the 2012 Costa biography award.
