= AARGH (Artists Against Rampant Government Homophobia) =

AARGH! (Artists Against Rampant Government Homophobia)
- Cover to AARGH! Art by Dave McKean.

Publication information
- Publisher: Mad Love
- Format: One-shot
- Publication date: March 1988
- No. of issues: 1

Creative team
- Written by: Alan Moore; David Lloyd; Neil Gaiman; Bryan Talbot; Dave Sim; Groc; Geoff Ryman; Alexei Sayle; Hunt Emerson; Sue Hyde; David Leach; Dave Gibbons; Dave Thorpe; David Shenton; Charles Shaar Murray; Posy Simmonds; Dick Foreman; Roz Kaveney; Garry Leach; Howard Cruse; Bill Sienkiewicz; Harvey Pekar; Art Spiegelman; Kevin O'Neill; Steven Appleby; Kate Charlesworth; Jennie Wilson; Lisa Power; Izzy Islam; Robert Crumb; Brian Bolland; Dominic Regan; Savage Pencil; Phil Elliott; Tony Reeves; Frank Miller; Kathy Acker; Jamie Delano; Mark Vicars; Joyce Brabner; Debbie Delano; Phyllis Moore
- Artist(s): Steve Bissette; David Lloyd; Rick Veitch; Dave Gibbons; Groc; Grahame Baker; Oscar Zarate; Hunt Emerson; David Leach; Lin Jammet; David Shenton; Floyd Hughes; Posy Simmonds; Dick Foreman; Graham Higgins; Garry Leach; Howard Cruse; Bill Sienkiewicz; Joe Zabel; Gary Dumm; Art Spiegelman; Kevin O'Neill; Steven Appleby; Bryan Talbot; Mark Buckingham; Kate Charlesworth; Dave Sim; Gerhard; Izzy Islam; Robert Crumb; Brian Bolland; Dominic Regan; Savage Pencil; Phil Elliot; Tony Reeves; Frank Miller; Shane Oakley; Denys Howard; Jaime Hernandez; Gilbert Hernandez
- Letterer(s): David Lloyd; Groc; Dave Gibbons; Hunt Emerson; David Leach; Lin Jammet; David Shenton; Floyd Hughes; Posy Simmonds; Dick Foreman; Graham Higgins; Garry Leach; Howard Cruse; Bill Sienkiewicz; Gary Dumm; Art Spiegelman; Steven Appleby; Steve Cradock; Kate Charlesworth; Izzy Islam; Robert Crumb; Brian Bolland; Dominic Regan; Savage Pencil; Phil Elliott; Tony Reeves; Frank Miller; Tom Frame
- Editor(s): Debbie Delano; Phyllis Moore

Collected editions
- Aargh!: ISBN 0-9513726-0-2

AARGH (Artists Against Rampant Government Homophobia) was a 76-page one-off comics anthology published by Mad Love in 1988.

The comic was designed to aid the fight against Clause 28, which was a controversial amendment to the Local Government Act 1988, a British law which was designed to outlaw the "promotion of homosexuality" by local authorities. At that time Alan Moore, who was in a relationship with his wife and their girlfriend, felt that the law was heterosexist and that it would obviously affect them personally. To help their fight Moore formed Mad Love, his own publishing company, to release AARGH. The publication raised $17,000 for Britain's Organisation for Lesbian and Gay Action.

The title was a mixed collection of almost 40 stories, mostly comics with some text pieces. Many of the pieces were satiric, and explored themes such as the persecution of homosexuals, morality police, homosexuals in history, and parallels between homophobia and fascism.

Moore himself contributed an eight-page story called "The Mirror of Love", with Steve Bissette and Rick Veitch providing art. Other creators included David Lloyd, Robert Crumb, Howard Cruse, Hunt Emerson, Neil Gaiman, Dave Gibbons, Los Bros Hernandez, Garry Leach, Dave McKean, Frank Miller, Harvey Pekar, Savage Pencil, Bill Sienkiewicz, Dave Sim, Posy Simmonds, Art Spiegelman, Alexei Sayle, and Bryan Talbot.

Clause 28 was eventually repealed in 2003. Moore has also reworked "The Mirror of Love" with illustrator José Villarrubia for Top Shelf Productions.
