= Kate Charlesworth =

British cartoonist and artist (born 1950)

- Born: 1950 (age 75–76); Barnsley, England
- Education: Manchester College of Art and Design
- Occupations: Cartoonist, artist
- Years active: 1973–present
- Notable work: Sally Heathcote: Suffragette; Sensible Footwear: A Girl's Guide
- Website: katecharlesworth.com

Kate Charlesworth (born 1950) is a British cartoonist and artist who has produced comics and illustrations since the 1970s. Her work has appeared in LGBT publications such as The Pink Paper, Gay News, Strip AIDS, Dyke's Delight, and AARGH, as well as The Guardian, The Independent and New Internationalist. Lesbian and Gay Studies: A Critical Introduction (Bloomsbury Publishing) calls her a "notable by-and-for lesbian" cartoonist.

In 2015, her graphic novel Sally Heathcote: Suffragette (with Mary and Bryan Talbot) was included in a list published by The Guardian of the "top 10 books about revolutionaries". Sensible Footwear: A Girl's Guide, her autobiography and history of gay and lesbian culture in England and Scotland from the end of World War II to the present, was published in 2018.

== Early life ==
Charlesworth was born in Barnsley, Yorkshire, England, in 1950 to Joan and Harold Charlesworth. Her parents ran a local corner shop during her childhood. She attended Wombwell High School in Barnsley and attended Manchester College of Art and Design to study graphics and stage design from 1968 to 1973.

Charlesworth is an only child.

== Career ==
Charlesworth's career in comics began in 1973, when she pitched a daily strip called "Twice Nightly", with two gay characters and suffragette themes to the Manchester Evening News. The strip ran for six months. In 1976, she moved to London, after which she was published in gay and lesbian newspapers including The Pink Paper, Gay News, and Sappho, LGBT comic books including Strip AIDS, Dyke's Delight, and AARGH, and mainstream publications including The Guardian and City Limits. Her strips and cartoons often addressed contemporary issues in the lesbian and wider LGBT communities, including presentation, socio-political issues including oppressive legislation, and stereotypes in a humorous manner. In 1995, her work appeared in Dyke's Delight issues 1 and 2, introducing some of her most popular characters, including Auntie Studs, to an American audience.

She has produced science comics for New Scientist ("Life, the Universe and (Almost) Everything") and The Independent, as well as illustrations for several books published by the National Museums of Scotland.

She describes her art style as not overly cartoonish or caricature, but emotionally realistic. In an interview she stated that she uses photographic reference and tries to get in the mind of each character to accurately portray their emotions on the page.

More recently, Charlesworth has shifted to working on graphic novels. She illustrated Sally Heathcote: Suffragette by Mary Talbot, published in 2014. Her illustrations were highly praised by Neel Mukherjee in The Guardian as "beautifully executed in black-and-white, with perfectly judged touches of colour". In 2011, she contributed to Blank Slate’s Nelson, a collaborative graphic novel with 54 British comic artists. Nelson was chosen as The Guardian's graphic novel of the month by Rachel Cooke and one of 2011's best graphic novels by The Times. Charlesworth spent four years working on her autobiographical work Sensible Footwear: A Girl's Guide, which was published in 2019.

Charlesworth has also worked as a storyboard artist for shows including Bob the Builder (Hot Animation), Pingu (Hot Animation), and Timmy Time (Aardman Animations). She has created several cards for Cath Tate Cards, run by fellow cartoonist and friend Cath Tate. She created the CD cover for Fast Talk by Kay Grant and Alex Ward. She also produces various forms of 3-D art, including birthday cards, maps, board games, and shadow boxes, featured on her website.

Her future plans include a joint comic project with her partner, Dianne, as well as moving into different mediums, including animation.

== Personal life ==
Charlesworth identifies as a lesbian and has stated that she embraced her identity as a dyke during her college years, when she entered into a romantic relationship. She has also expressed the view that the lesbian community at the time engaged in significant self-policing of behavior and appearance, which, in her opinion, limited her ability to fully realize her identity and influenced much of her subsequent work.

Charlesworth has been politically active in British and Scottish politics and pushes for equal rights. When Clause 28 of the Local Government Act was being pushed in 1988, aiming to ban the promotion of and education about homosexuality by local authorities, including schools, Charlesworth teamed up with Viv Quillin, Cath Jackson, and Cath Tate, three other local cartoonists, to produce a series of postcards to campaign against it. More recently, she has notably been outspoken against Brexit and President Trump, arguing that their popularity represent a backslide for LGBT rights.

She has also been involved in many efforts to increase awareness of LGBT history. In 2006, she illustrated a guide for a walking tour of 500 years of Edinburgh's LGBT history, published by the LGBT Centre for Health and Wellbeing and Remember When. In the same year she participated in the City of Edinburgh Council's "Rainbow City" exhibition at the City Art Centre. She also participates in Edinburgh's Loud and Proud choir, which sang at Equal Marriage lobbies of the Scottish Parliament.

As of 2019, she lives with Dianne, her partner of 13 years, a dog and a cat in the Borders in Scotland.

== Awards and honors ==
- Her work was included along that of Howard Cruse, Groc, Kath Jackson, and David Shenton in the 1990s in an exhibition at the Basement Gallery in London in association with Krazy Kat Theatre Company.
- Charlesworth and David Shenton had an exhibition of 50 queer-themed cartoons called "Sh(OUT): Contemporary art and Human Rights," developed with OurStory Scotland, at the Glasgow Gallery of Modern Art in 2009.
- In 2015, Sally Heathcote: Suffragette was included in a list published by The Guardian of the "top 10 books about revolutionaries".
- Charlesworth was included among 100 British women cartoonists in "The Inking Woman" exhibition at the Cartoon Museum in 2017.
- In 2019, an exhibition of Charlesworth's art from Sensible Footwear: A Girl's Guide was held by the United Kingdom European Commission at Europe House.
- Her work was acquired by Glasgow Museum for their fine arts collection in 2019.
- Charlesworth held a pop-up display at the Cartoon Museum to coincide with the release of her new book in 2019.
- Sensible Footwear: A Girl's Guide appeared on the 2019 Portico Prize longlist.

== Bibliography ==
=== Books ===
- Sensible Footwear: A Girl’s Guide (Myriad Editions, 2019), ISBN 9780993563348
  - Autobiography detailing Charlesworth's realization of her sexuality, her complicated relationship with her parents, and her political fight against oppression such as the legislative section 28. Also a social history of British LGBT identity, experiences, and prejudices from the post-war period to the present day.
- Sally Heathcote: Suffragette (with Mary M. Talbot and Bryan Talbot; Dark Horse Comics, 2014), ISBN 9781616555474
  - Follows a fictional suffragette, Sally Heathcote, through the British fight for women's suffrage as she encounters famous figures such as Emmeline Pankhurst and becomes more involved in the movement, including being arrested and force-fed.
- Mary Anning: A Souvenir (Lyme Regis, 1999)
  - Produced by Charlesworth for the Lyme Regis Museum's 1999 exhibition on Mary Anning.
- The Cartoon History of Time (with John Gribbin; Cardinal, 1990), ISBN 9780486490977
- All That...: The Other Half of History (with Marsaili Cameron; Pandora, 1986), ISBN 9780863580673
  - Mostly visual satirical history textbook placing women at its center.
- Exotic Species: A Field Guide to Some of Our British Gays (GMP, 1984), ISBN 9780907040385

=== Contributions ===
==== Graphic novel collaborations ====
- Nelson (edited by Rob Davis and Woodrow Phoenix, Blank Slate Comics, 2011), ISBN 9781906653231
- IDP: 2043 (edited by Denise Mina; Cargo Publishing, 2014), ISBN 9781908754639
- "Deeds, Not Words", with Mary and Bryan Talbot, Here I Stand: Stories That Speak for Freedom (edited by Amnesty International UK; Walker Books, 2016), ISBN 9781406373646

==== Comic strips and cartoons ====
- "Twice Nightly", Manchester Evening News (1973)
- "Exotic Species", Gay News (prior to 1984)
- "Claptrap", Company (1984–1985)
- "Getting Things Straight", Strip AIDS (Willyprods/Small Time Ink Ltd, 1987)
- "28 Trivia Quiz", AARGH (Mad Love Graphics, 1988)
- "Life, the Universe and (Almost) Everything", New Scientist (1988-2002)
- "Plain Tales from the Bar", Pink Paper (Millivres Prowler Limited, 1988–1994)
- Women Draw 1984: Sixty-Six Cartoonists Eye the Present and the Future, edited by Paula Youens and Suzanne Perkins (The Women's Press, January 1983) ISBN 0704339196
- "Media Spillage", Ariel (BBC)
- "Font & Font", The Bookseller
- "Second Class Child", 7 Ages of Woman (Knockabout Comics, May 1990) ISBN 0861660870
- "Cartoon", Perverse Politics: Lesbian Issues (Feminist Review, 1990) ISBN 9780203990933
- "Girl's Talk", with David Shenton, The Comic Book of the Facts of Life (Penguin Books, 1991) OCLC 926737462
- "Through the Veil", written by Wren Sidhe, Immaculate Deception: Dissenting Women (Fanny, 1992)
- "Low Risk Isn't No Risk", British Deaf Association (Lesbian and Gay Switchboard, 1992)
- "Naughty Little Monkeys", Pink Paper (Millivres Prowler Limited, 1992–1995)
- Cover art and "Auntie Studs: The Early Years", Dyke's Delight #1 (Knockabout Comics, 1993)
- Cover art and "Auntie Studs is Rebel Without a Cat!", Dyke's Delight #2 (Knockabout Comics, 1994)
- "Millennium Basin", The Guardian (1994–1996)
- "Lysteria Crescent", The Independent (mid-1990s)
- "Auntie Studs, Agony Dyke", Women Out of Line (Knockabout Comics, March 1997) ISBN 0861661281
- The Worm: The Longest Comic Strip in the World, with Neil Gaiman, Alan Moore, and others (Slab-O-Concrete Publications, 1999)
- "Kate Charlesworth's guide to the Edinburgh festival", The Guardian (2004)
- "Moving On Up", with Brick Charlesworth (BBC, 2008), ISBN 9781860002410
- Drawn Out and Painted Pink, with David Shenton (Cath Tate Cards, 2009)
  - Produced and published to go along with their Glasgow Museum of Modern Art exhibition called "Sh[OUT]: Contemporary art and Human Rights", with OurStory Scotland. The exhibition highlighted social justice
- "The feral rich- how can we help them?" New Internationalist (2013)
- "Put a Ring On It", Diva Magazine (2014–2015)

==== Books (illustrations) ====
- Bolton, David, et al. (1989), Oxford Intensive English Courses: OK 1: Student's Book, Oxford University Press, ISBN 9780194323536
- Bongo, Ali (1979), Be a Magician, Macdonald Educational, ISBN 9780356063683
- Brown, Gabrielle, editor (2019), Psychoanalytic Thinking on the Unhoused Mind, Routledge, ISBN 9780429620782
- Dickson, Anne (1982), A Woman In Your Own Right: Assertiveness and You, Quartet Books Limited, ISBN 9780704372696
- Dickson, Anne (1985), The Mirror Within: A New Look at Sexuality, Quartet, ISBN 9780704334748
- Henriques, Nikki and Anne Dickson (1986), Women on Hysterectomy: How Long Before I Can Hang-glide?, Thorsons, ISBN 9780722511640
- Hopson, Barry and Mike Scally (1988), Communication: Time to Talk, Lifeskills Publishing Group, ISBN 9781852521059
- Irvine, Susan (1994), Bird Facts, HMSO: National Museums of Scotland, ISBN 9780114952167
- Johnston, Sue (1989), Hold On to the Messy Times, Pandora, ISBN 9780044404972
- Kitchener, Andrew (1993), Escape from Extinction, HMSO: National Museums of Scotland, ISBN 9780114951221
- National and Local Government Officers Association (1988), Part-time Work, NALGO
- National and Local Government Officers Association (1986), Job Sharing, NALGO
- Robinson, Richard (2006), Why the One You Fancy Never Fancies You: Murphy's Laws of Love, Constable & Robinson, ISBN 9781845294458
- Summerskill, Clare (2008), We’re The Girls and Other Songs, Stories, and Monologues, Diana Pub., ISBN 9780955830808
- Swinney, Geoff (1993), Fish Facts, HMSO: National Museums of Scotland, ISBN 9780114951214
- Wade, Mike and Sue Mitchell (1999), On the Trail of Scotland's Past, NMS Pub., ISBN 9781901663051
