= Mark Stafford =

London-based comics artist

- Born: 1970 (age 55–56) Bournemouth, Dorset, England, UK
- Areas: Writer, Penciller, Inker, Colorist
- Notable works: Cherubs! The Man Who Laughs; Lip Hook; The Bad, Bad Place; Salmonella Smorgasbord

Mark Stafford (born 1970) is a London-based cartoonist. His work was first seen in the UK small press/underground comics scene in the mid-Nineties.

== Graphic novels ==
The first graphic novel illustrated by Stafford was Cherubs! It was written and co-created by Bryan Talbot, with the first half being published by Desperado Publishing in 2007 before the entire work was published by Dark Horse Comics in 2013. He later illustrated three more, all written by David Hine. The first of these was 2013's The Man Who Laughs, which was followed by Lip Hook: A Tale Of Rural Unease in 2018 and The Bad, Bad Place in 2019.

== Self-published work ==
Stafford's self-published comics include Botulism Banquet - A Compendium of Carcinogenic Canapés, Scenes From Books I Have Not Read, Coin, Tinhorn Galoot and Something Wicked/Something Waiting.

A collection of his self-published work called Salmonella Smorgasbord: A Collection Of Crimes Against Cartooning was published in 2023.

== Anthologies ==
Stafford has contributed to anthologies such as The End, The Lovecraft Anthology Volume One, Meanwhile..., The Mammoth Book of Skulls, HOAX Psychosis Blues, The Broken Frontier Anthology and The Golden Thread.

== Funded projects ==
In 2009 Stafford worked with Southwark Council on a graphic novels/comics mural for John Harvard Library, and in 2017 he co-operated with the British Council on its Shakespeare Lives project in Seoul, South Korea. He subsequently collaborated with the British Council again in 2018 in partnership with Arts Council Korea on a comics project with the Kangkangee Arts Village in Busan, South Korea. In 2022 he worked with Raksha Pande at Newcastle University on Arranging Love, a comic based on Pande's research about attitudes to arranged marriage in modern UK based Punjabi communities.

== Commercial work ==
Stafford's artwork has appeared on beer labels and record labels, and he has designed 2D puppets for a theatre production. He has also produced comic strips for the UK animal abuse defence society Animal Aid and is cartoonist in residence at the London Cartoon Museum.
