= Stephen James Joyce =

Grandson of James Joyce (1932–2020)

Stephen James Joyce (15 February 1932 – 23 January 2020) was the grandson of James Joyce and the executor of Joyce's literary estate.

== Biography ==
Joyce was born in Paris, France, the son of James Joyce's son, Giorgio Joyce, and Helen Joyce (née Kastor). Joyce graduated in 1958 from Harvard University, where he once roomed with Paul Matisse, the grandson of French impressionist painter Henri Matisse, and with Prince Sadruddin Aga Khan.

Thereafter, he worked for the Organisation for Economic Co-operation and Development on African development. He retired from the OECD in 1991 to focus on managing his grandfather's estate. He and his wife, Solange Raythchine Joyce, lived in the Île de Ré in France. They had no children. With Joyce's death, James Joyce has no living descendants.

=== Work with the James Joyce estate ===
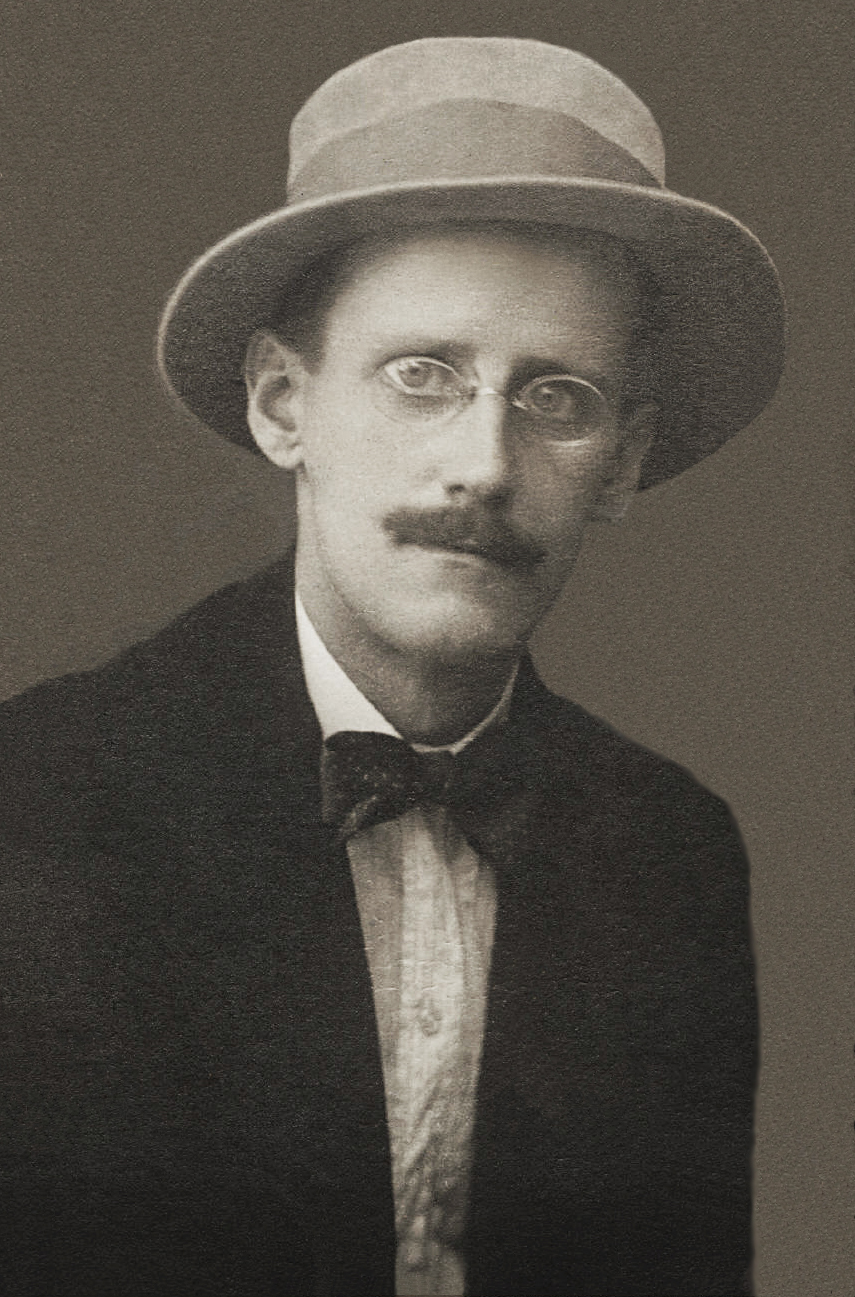
Joyce's grandfather, James

Joyce and Seán Sweeney were the joint trustees of the Estate of James Joyce. As a trustee, he brought numerous lawsuits or threats of legal action against scholars, biographers, and artists attempting to quote from Joyce's literary work or personal correspondence.

In 2004, Joyce threatened legal action against the Irish government when the Rejoyce Dublin 2004 festival proposed public reading of excerpts of Ulysses on Bloomsday. In 1988, he destroyed a collection of letters written by Lucia Joyce, his aunt.

In 1989, he forced Brenda Maddox to delete a postscript concerning Lucia from her biography, Nora: The Real Life of Molly Bloom. After 1995, he announced no permissions would be granted to quote from his grandfather's work. Libraries holding letters by James Joyce were unable to show them without permission. Versions of his work online were disallowed. Joyce said he was protecting his grandfather's and his family's reputation, but he would sometimes grant permission to use material in exchange for fees that were deemed by some as "extortionate".

On 1 January 2012, 70 calendar years after James Joyce's death, all of his works entered the public domain in much of the world, a transition "talked up in certain quarters as though it were a bookish version of the destruction of the Death Star, with Stephen Joyce cast as a highbrow Darth Vader suddenly no longer in a position to breathe heavily down the necks of rebel Joyceans." "On New Year's Eve [December 31, 2011], the Twitter feed of UbuWeb ... posted a link to an article in The Irish Times about the expiry of European copyright on the work of James Joyce. The link was accompanied by a curt message to Joyce's grandson and sole living descendant: "Fuck you, Stephen Joyce. EU copyright on James Joyce's works ends at midnight."

However, although it is no longer necessary to receive permission from James Joyce's estate to quote from the work he published in his lifetime, "the status of posthumous publications — the letter[s] and manuscripts, for instance ... is still unclear". In addition, in the US, some of his work remains protected by copyright. Prior to this, in 2007, Joyce's hold on the estate had already been delimited by a fair use suit brought by Carol Loeb Schloss and the Stanford Law School Center for Internet and Society's Fair Use Project.

When the Central Bank of Ireland issued a ten euro James Joyce commemorative coin on 10 April 2013, Joyce described the coin and the circumstances of its issue as "one of the greatest insults to the Joyce family that has ever been perpetrated in Ireland". He complained of a lack of consultation over the coin; he objected to an error in a Joycean quotation inscribed on the coin; he was upset by the design of the portrait on the coin, calling it "the most unlikely likeness of Joyce ever produced"; and he described as highly insensitive and offensive the decision to issue the coin on the anniversary of the death of his grandmother, Nora Joyce, who died in 1951.
