= Cherubs! =

Graphic novel by Bryan Talbot

- Page count: 104 pages
- Publisher: Desperado Publishing Dark Horse Books

Creative team
- Writers: Bryan Talbot
- Artists: Bryan Talbot (layouts); Mark Stafford

Original publication
- Date of publication: 28 November 2007, 2015
- ISBN: 0979593999

Cherubs! Paradise Lost is a fantasy graphic novel by British artist Bryan Talbot, who wrote the script and provided the layouts, with the finished art by Mark Stafford. The first book, or 'cantica', was published by Desperado Publishing in November 2007. The first and second books were combined to complete the story in a hardcover edition published by Dark Horse in 2015.

Talbot describes it as "an irreverent fast-paced supernatural comedy-adventure."

== Plot ==
In "Cantica I: Paradise lost," on the trail of the murdering archangel Abaddon, the Cherubs get stuck in the mind-numbing mediocrity of Limbo - but not for long. They escape and make it to New York City, where, looking for signs and portents, they foil a mugging and are befriended by Mary, a sexy 'exotic dancer'. But she has a problem: her boss is Frankie Dracula, and his vampire minions are out to kill her!

In "Cantica II: Hell On Earth," Mary and the Cherubs are drawn into a battle with the massed forces of Hell whilst attempting to foil Abbadon's plans to instigate the apocalypse.
