= The Mo Sheringham Museum =

Museum in Sheringham, Norfolk

Coordinates: 52.9452°N 1.2134°E

Sheringham Museum
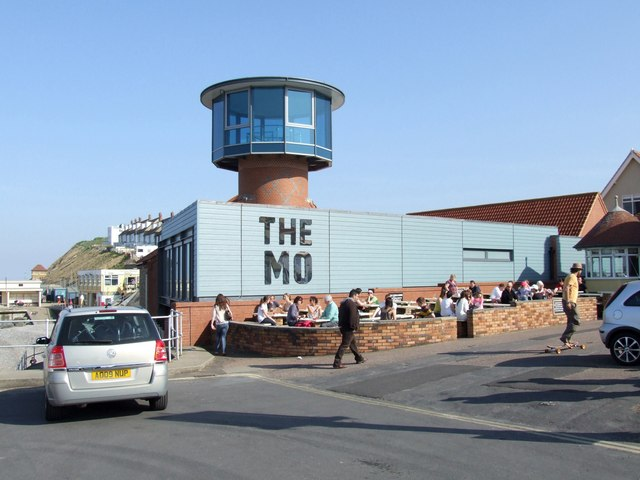
- The main entrance to the museum, on the East Beach promenade in Sheringham.
- Established: 1987, moved and upgraded in April 2010, further enlarged in 2017
- Location: Sheringham, Norfolk, United Kingdom
- Type: Local History and fine art and antiquities
- Collection size: Features an historic fleet of lifeboats and fishing boats, local photographic collections, other artworks, geology, social history and regularly-changed exhibitions
- Website: Sheringham museum

Sheringham Museum at the Mo is a museum in the town of Sheringham, Norfolk, England. The current museum opened in April 2010 and rehoused the former collection originally held in converted fishermen's cottages behind the main street.

== History ==
Sheringham has a recorded history going back over a thousand years, but there is also evidence of Roman and Viking settlement in the area. The town's name is thought to derive from a Viking village ('Scira's Home'). The original museum was located in converted fishermen's cottages and washhouses in the heart of the town, and was obviously unable to accommodate a growing collection which included three of the town's restored lifeboats.

== Solving the space problem - The Mo ==
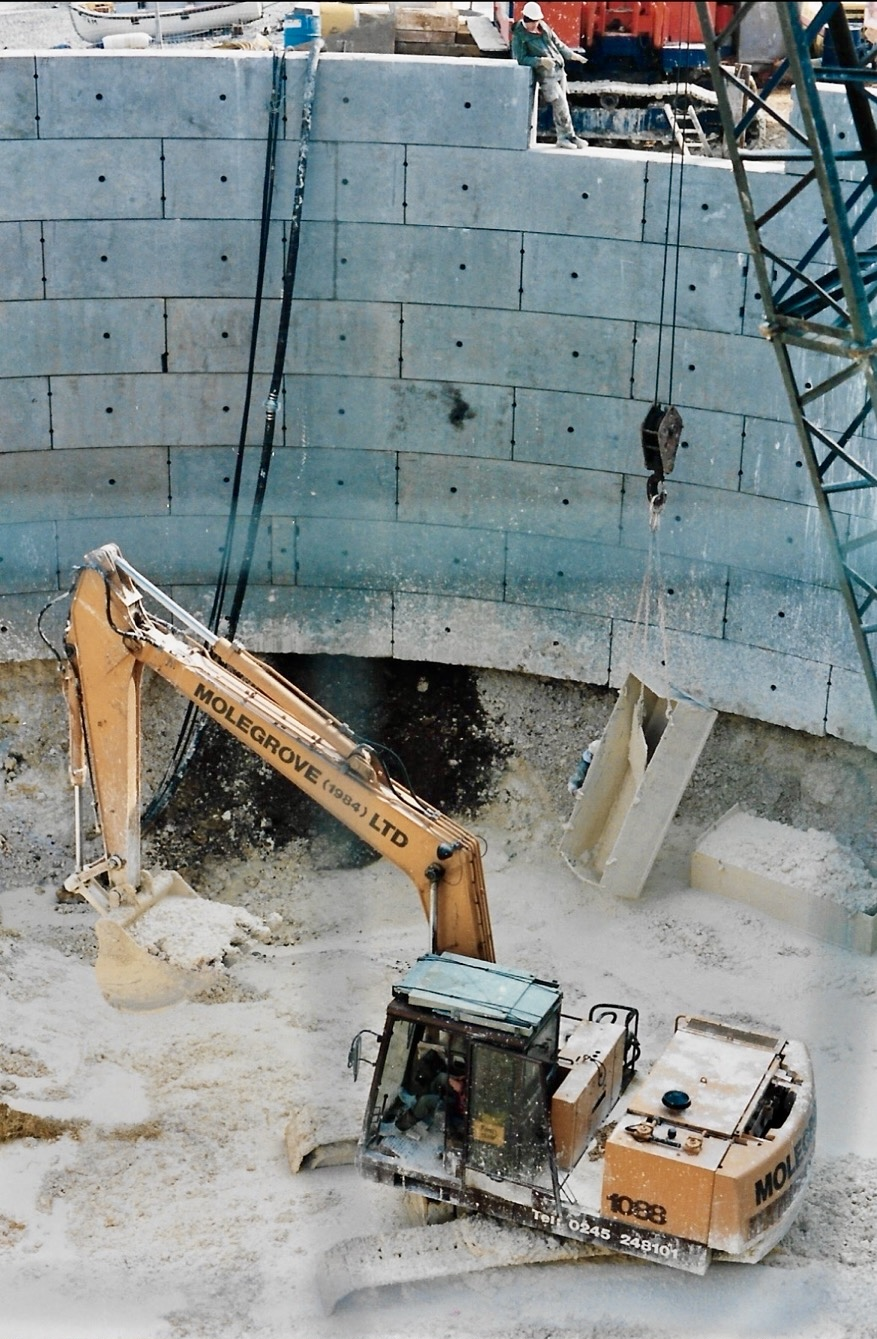
Construction of storm water tank at The Mo Sheringham 1993

The Mo was originally a house named after Morag, born 1881, daughter of Sir Thomas Digby Pigott a member of the Upcher family. Richard Frederick Hayward, M.C., K.C., a maritime lawyer and farmer, was the last owner. The military requisitioned the property in 1940 and although initially intended as a defensive stronghold against invading forces, it was principally used to train troops in house to house fighting. Badly damaged, it was pulled down in 1946 and the site was then used as an open-air bandstand and children’s playground. Anglian Water acquired the site in 1996 from North Norfolk District Council in order to build a multimillion-pound sewerage scheme for the town, in return they built an ‘amenity building’ on the top of a massive storm and overflow tank, and although this new building was leased to the District Council it remained empty until 2009 when NNDC and Anglian Water allowed the lease to be transferred to Sheringham Museum Trust.

In April 2010, the museum reopened in a new facility located in "The Mo". Displays focus on the town's social history, its fishing industry and its development as a holiday resort. The museum also houses the Sheringham Shoal Windfarm Visitor Centre.

The Museum is an independent enterprise, staffed by Sheringham volunteers and employing a professional manager. It opens for approximately ten months each year (annual opening and closing dates vary a little) and mounts a number of temporary exhibitions each year. Apart from its notable collection of Sheringham lifeboats (now numbering four, with a fifth in a separate property) it is now the coordination point for Maritime Heritage East and established by the Art Fund as the leader of the Gansey Heritage Network.

== See also ==
- J C Madge on display in The Sheringham Museum
- Forester’s Centenary on display in The Sheringham Museum
- The Manchester Unity of Oddfellows on display in The Sheringham Museum
