= OurStory Scotland =

LGBT history project in Scotland

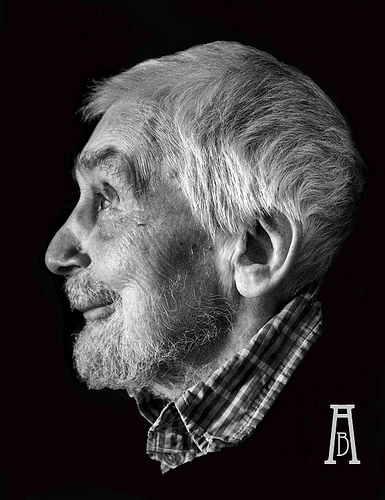
Side portrait of poet and OurStory Scotland patron (2005-2010), Edwin Morgan, at age 89.

OurStory Scotland is a community history and oral history project founded in 2002 to record the histories of Scotland's LGBT communities from the 1920s to present day. Based in the Mitchell Library in Glasgow, OurStory Scotland is a recognised Scottish charity.

Edwin Morgan became its first patron in 2005 and was succeeded by Jackie Kay in 2010.

== History ==
Its founder, James Valentine, wrote about the aims of the project:

"Where voices are unheard, hidden or suppressed, the images and representations of a community may be stereotyped and discriminatory, constructed about the community by those on the outside. LGBT (lesbian, gay, bisexual and transgender) people have experienced social exclusion and marginalisation, and their stories have been neglected or distorted. Their lives and loves have been characterised as wrong: mistaken in medical or moral terms. OurStory Scotland was established to research, record and celebrate the history and experiences of the LGBT community through their own words."

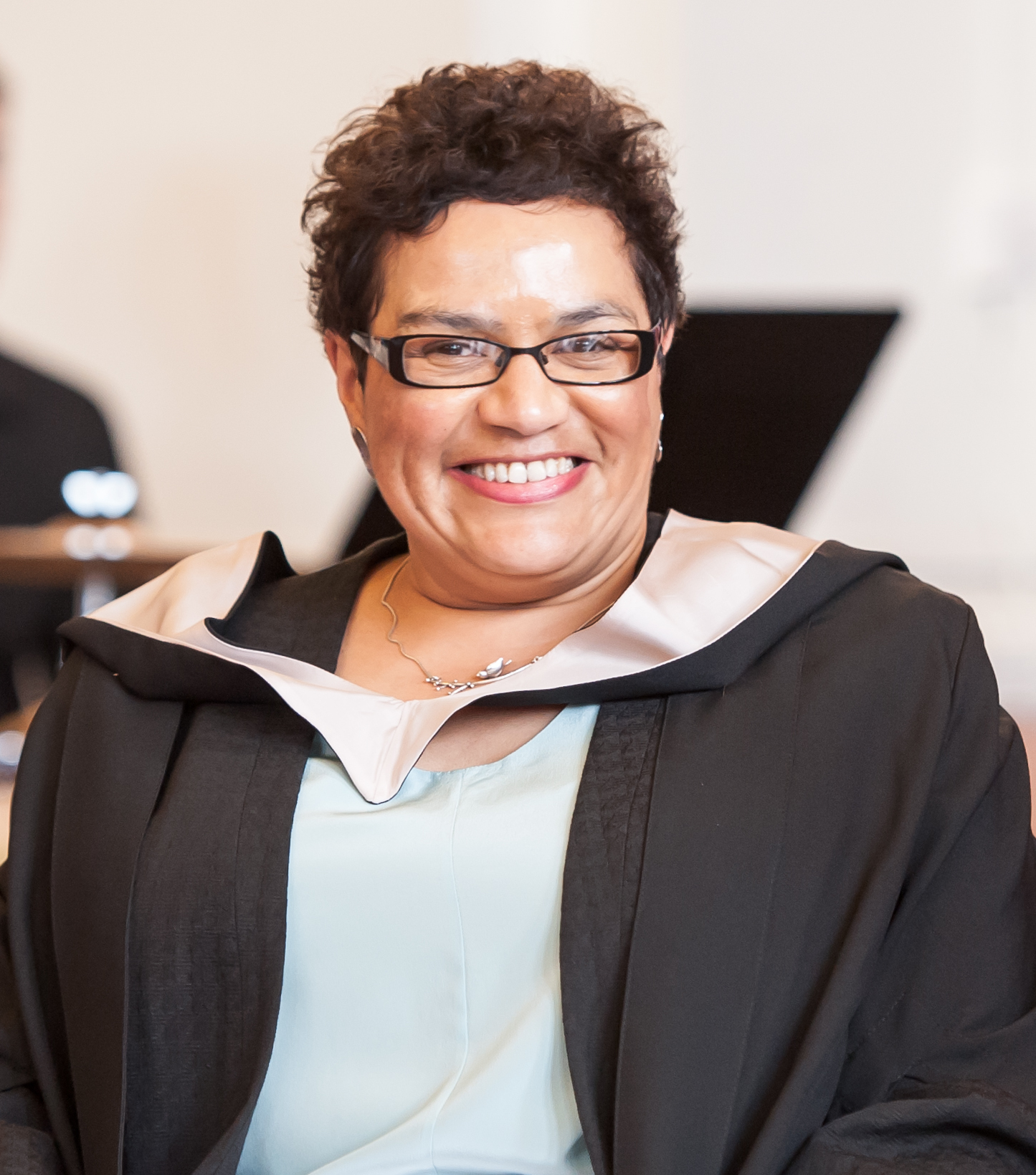
Jackie Kay MBE, poet and patron of OurStory Scotland.

OurStory Scotland was formally constituted in 2002 and was recognised as a Scottish Charity in 2004.

In 2004, the project worked with 7:84 Theatre Company Scotland to create "seXshunned", which presented a series of scenes and stories as theatrical monologues from several decades of the twentieth century. In 2005, the project was awarded £20,000 by the Scottish Arts Council Lottery Fund to fund Queer Story Scotland as a further 18 month initiative "to encourage gays in the country to tell their stories... especially those away from the big cities, whose gay experiences have largely been neglected by historical archives."

The project held an exhibition, OurSpace, featuring multimedia storytelling at the Kelvingrove Art Gallery and Museum in Glasgow from February to March 2008. Valentine described this as a high point "for claiming space for our stories" as the Kelvingrove is the UK's largest civic museum and art gallery, and is Scotland's most visited attraction.

The OurStory Scotland collection is described as:

"a dispersed archive, with materials in appropriate national institutions, that draws on the expertise of specialists in different types of material to form a national archive of LGBT Lives. Our life stories and experiences cover a time period from the 1920s until the present day. We continue to collect recordings and handwritten episodes so our archive is constantly growing."

The archives and manuscript collections of the National Library of Scotland contain oral history recordings and personal testimonies collected by OurStory Scotland.
