= Mary M. Talbot =

British academic and author

Mary Talbot
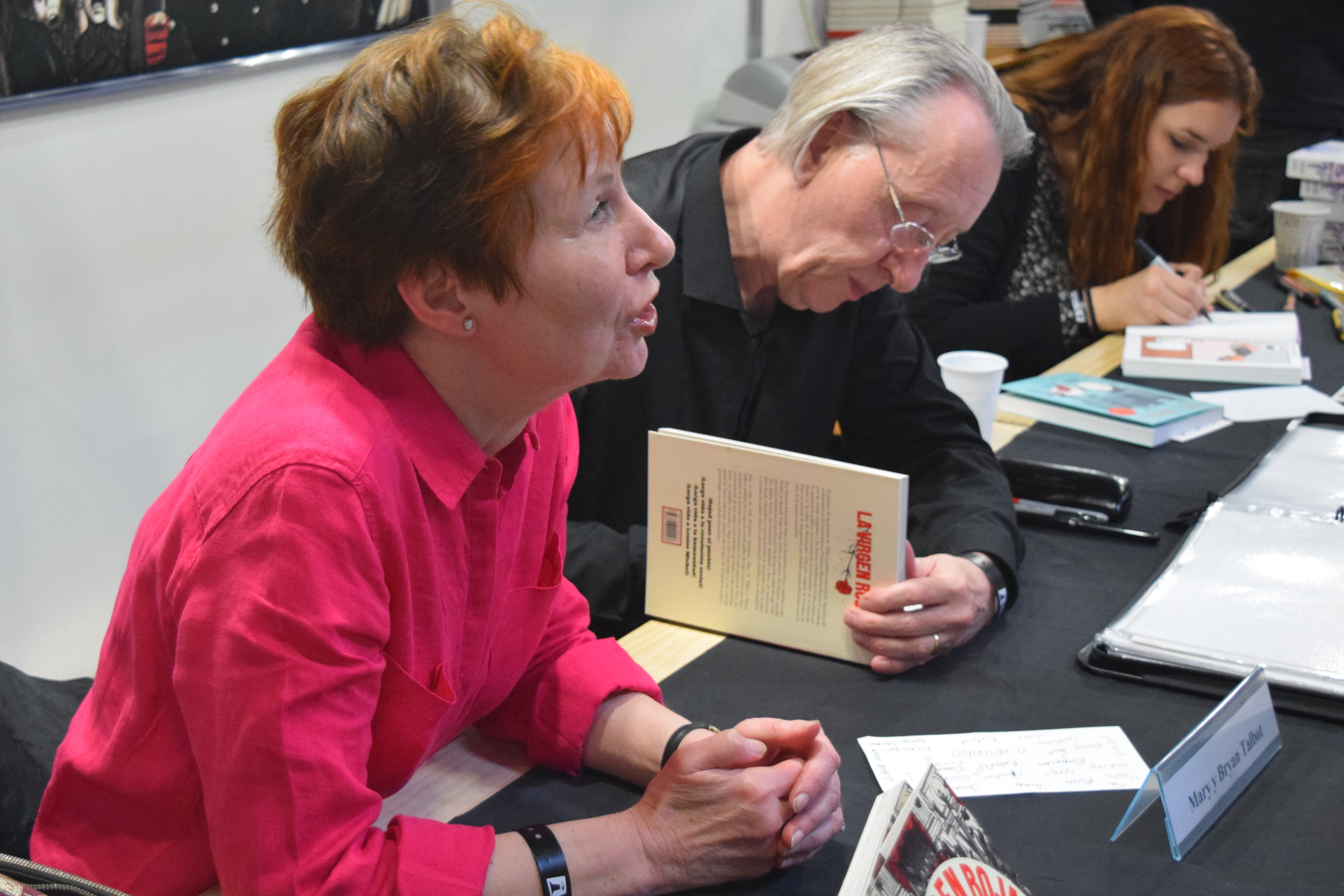
- Born: 1954 (age 71–72); Wigan, United Kingdom
- Education: Lancaster University
- Occupations: Author and academic
- Spouse: Bryan Talbot

Mary Talbot is a British academic and author. She has written several well received academic works in critical discourse analysis and since 2009 has turned her hand to freelance writing. Her first graphic novel Dotter of Her Father's Eyes, published by Jonathan Cape in 2012 and illustrated by her husband Bryan Talbot won the 2012 Costa biography prize.

Talbot gained a PhD in critical discourse analysis from Lancaster University. Following a variety of teaching posts, she became Reader in Language and Culture at the University of Sunderland in 1997.

== Selected publications ==
- Rain (Graphic Novel) with illustrations by Bryan Talbot. 2019.
- Talbot, Mary M., with illustrations by Bryan Talbot. 2016. The Red Virgin and the Vision of Utopia. Graphic Novel Milwaukie, OR: Dark Horse Comics.
- Talbot, Mary M., with illustrations by Kate Charlesworth. 2014. Sally Heathcote: Suffragette. Graphic novel Milwaukie, OR: Dark Horse Comics.
- Talbot, Mary M., and Bryan Talbot. 2012. Dotter of Her Father's Eyes. Graphic novel Milwaukie, OR: Dark Horse Comics.
- Talbot, Mary M. 1998. Language and gender: an introduction. Cambridge, UK: Polity Press.
- Talbot, Mary M. 1995. Fictions at work: language and social practice in fiction. London: Longman.
- Talbot, Mary. 1992 "The construction of gender in a teenage magazine." Critical language awareness: 174–200.
