= UK Hand Knitting Association =

UK Hand Knitting Association

The UK Hand Knitting Association (UKHKA) is a not-for-profit British organisation dedicated to promoting hand knitting in the UK. Through a variety of initiatives and the assistance of a nationwide network of volunteers who pass on their skills, the UKHKA focus on ensuring a vibrant future for all aspects of yarn crafts.

The UK Hand Knitting Association is dedicated to promoting the craft of hand knitting. The Association operates also across the Internet, and distributes information about knitting and crochet basic techniques, books, courses, knitting patterns and more.

At major craft shows and other events volunteers provide one to one tuition to encourage newcomers to learn yarn craft skills.

Information about craft shows and the basic techniques involved in hand knitting and crochet, along with local knitting groups, books, courses, knitting patterns and more, are publicised on the Association's website. Financial institutions suggest that retail outlets for knitting paraphernalia should become members of the Association.

The UKHKA Board Members are major distributors of yarn and related products in the UK, while the Associate Members are event organisers and craft magazine publishers.

The UKHKA (formerly The British Hand Knitting Confederation (BHKC)) was formed in 1991 when the Hand Knitting Association (HKA) merged with the British Hand Knitting Association (BHKA).

== Initiatives to raise the profile of hand knitting ==
=== Craft Club ===
Craft Club, co sponsored by the Crafts Council and the NFWI, was a national campaign to pass on yarn craft skills to newcomers of all ages. Craft Club encouraged the setting up of after-school clubs, youth groups and extended to the wider community in public venues such as museums, art galleries and libraries.

=== Knit 1 Hook 1 Pass It On ===
Knit 1 Hook 1 Pass It On was a national initiative that encouraged volunteers to pass on their skills. All those who knit and crochet could take part in this campaign to ensure their skills were passed on to future generations. The UKHKA had a Knit 1 Hook 1 Pass It On stand at numerous craft shows across the UK each year. The website has details on these shows. Volunteers have said of the experience: ‘It was my pleasure to help out and I will definitely be volunteering again at some point’ and ‘I really enjoyed my helping role, although I think I learned more than I taught’.

=== The Knitted Textile Awards (KTAs) ===
The KTAs were introduced in 2003, to showcase the talent of students graduating in knitted textiles across the UK. This celebration of knitting highlights the best in design innovation and creativity, and a full line up of each year’s finalists can be found on the website. The yearly awards are judged on originality, overall concept and the innovative use of technique, yarns, materials and colour. The diversity of the exhibition dispels preconceptions as the finalists show that the knitted stitch has no limits. The 2011 Finalists commented ‘I had a great time and met a lot of interesting like-minded people. It was a huge boost to my confidence’ and ‘It’s been a fantastic opportunity that I've really enjoyed’. All the finalists’ work and contact details are fully showcased on the UKHKA website.

== See also ==
- Save the Children Woolly Hat Campaign
- Norwich University College of the Arts Textile ~ BA Textiles Graduate earns innovation award at Knitted Textiles Awards
- Robert Gordon University Aberdeen ~ Gray's Graduate shortlisted for UKHKA Award
- UKHKA Supporting Quilts 4 London ~ a community project (part of the London 2012 Cultural Olympiad)
- Culture 24 Craft Council Collaboration for Knit 1 Pass It On
- Shetland News ~ UKHKA Knitted Textiles Awards
- The National Federation of Women's Institutes ~ Stylish Stitches Competition
- The Guardian ~ The Power of Knitting and Craft in Education
