= The Tale of One Bad Rat =

Comic book by Bryan Talbot

- Cover of The Tale of One Bad Rat 1 (October 1994), art by Bryan Talbot

Publication information
- Publisher: Dark Horse Comics
- Schedule: Monthly
- Format: Mini-series
- Publication date: October 1994 – January 1995
- No. of issues: 4

Creative team
- Created by: Bryan Talbot
- Written by: Bryan Talbot
- Artist: Bryan Talbot
- Letterer: Bryan Talbot
- Editor(s): Dick Hansom; Randy Stradley

Collected editions
- The Tale of One Bad Rat: ISBN 1-56971-077-5

The Tale of One Bad Rat is a 4-issue comic book limited series by Bryan Talbot. It was first published by Dark Horse Comics in 1994 and later brought out in a collected edition.

The graphic novel tells the story of Helen Potter, an unhoused teenager coping with the aftermath of childhood sexual abuse. The narrative makes extensive reference to the life and works of Beatrix Potter, whose books play a significant role in Helen's imagination and emotional recovery. The work is also a love letter to northern England's Lake District.

One Bad Rat is the most mainstream of Talbot's works and is drawn in a naturalistic style with painted colours. In contrast to much of his earlier fantasy and science-fiction work, for One Bad Rat Talbot adopted a more documentary approach, basing the characters on real people and the settings on photographs of real locations.

== Background ==
According to The Guardian:

While researching a novel about Beatrix Potter's oppressive childhood, Talbot spotted a homeless teenager on the London underground. "I saw this girl begging on the tube at Tottenham Court Road and it put me in mind of the descriptions of Beatrix. I thought I could do a story about a runaway who has this synchronistic link with Beatrix Potter."

== Publication history ==
Although it was first published in four comic books, The Tale of One Bad Rat is divided into three sections.

=== Collected editions ===
The series has been collected into an individual volume:

- The Tale of One Bad Rat (136 pages, softcover, Dark Horse, October 1995, ISBN 1-56971-077-5; Titan Books, January 1996, ISBN 1-85286-689-6; hardcover, Dark Horse, April 1997, ISBN 1-56971-127-5; Jonathan Cape, August 2008, ISBN 0-224-08470-4)

== Plot synopsis ==
Its heroine is called Helen Potter; Helen was Beatrix Potter's first name.

In the first chapter, "Town", Helen Potter is a teenage runaway begging on the streets of London with only her pet rat and her Beatrix Potter books for company, and contemplating suicide. In flashback, we learn that she has fled her uncaring mother and sexually abusive father. She is also a talented artist. She moves into a squat with some young men who save her from the unwanted attentions of a man (who turns out to be a Conservative MP) by mugging him. When she is later spotted by the MP, she is forced to flee from the police. She returns to the squat to find that her rat has been killed by the squatters' cat, and leaves to hitchhike north.

"Road" sees Helen making her way north towards the Lake District, drawn by its connection with Beatrix Potter, and accompanied by a giant vision of her rat. There are further flashbacks to the crisis that made her flee her family home. Eventually, in deep countryside, a driver makes a pass at her. She fights him off with such ferocity that he crashes the car. Helen flees into the evening, eventually passing out outside a mysterious building.

In "Country" it is revealed that Helen collapsed outside a country pub and has been taken on as a waitress there. Walking in the hills (still with her giant imaginary rat) and reading self-help books helps her to heal her wounds and prepares her to face her parents. She confronts her father and tells her parents she wants to stay in the Lake District. Finally she visits Hill Top, Beatrix Potter's home, and imagines finding a lost Potter book - "The Tale of One Bad Rat" - whose story echoes her own and gives a happy ending. The chapter, and series, ends with Helen sitting sketching a dramatic view over Buttermere and Crummock Water.

== Reception/awards ==
Writing about The Tale of One Bad Rat for Slings & Arrows, Frank Plowright praised Talbot's handling of difficult subject matter, describing the book as "extraordinarily moving" and commending its emotional depth, visual storytelling, and evocation of the English landscape. He particularly highlighted Talbot's depictions of the Lake District as "detailed, beautiful, and instantly recognizable," arguing that the artist's understanding of "history and landscape" enriches the story throughout.

Reviewing the graphic novel for Comics Worth Reading, Johanna Draper Carlson praised Talbot's artwork as "beautifully drawn and colored and as easy to read as Potter's," highlighting the authenticity of his settings and the contrast between grim urban scenes and the idyllic English countryside. She described the book as "one of the classics, a book that speaks to everyone and demonstrates the maturity of the medium," concluding that its "beauty encourages the spirit, providing hope for growth while overcoming a terrible past."

The Tale of One Bad Rat won the 1995 UK Comic Art Award for Best New Publication and the 1995 Don Thompson Award for Best Limited Series. The collected edition won the Eisner Award for best Graphic Album Reprint in 1996, and received several other awards and nominations, including bring longlisted for the James Tiptree, Jr. Award in 1997.

== Legacy ==
According to The Guardian, The Tale of One Bad Rat "has been published in nearly 20 countries and used in schools and child sex-abuse centres in Britain, the US, and Germany." Other interviews with Talbot also feature discussions about the graphic novel's use in child abuse programs.

== Potential film adaptation ==
In 2021, the film rights to The Tale of One Bad Rat were optioned by Grasp the Nettle Films.
