= Alice in Sunderland =

2007 graphic novel by Bryan Talbot

- Author: Bryan Talbot
- Illustrator: Bryan Talbot
- Cover artist: Jordan Smith
- Language: English
- Genre: Graphic novel, History, Fantasy
- Published: 5 April 2007; Jonathan Cape (UK), Dark Horse (US)
- Publication place: UK
- Media type: Hardcover
- Pages: 328
- ISBN: 978-0-224-08076-7 (UK), ISBN 978-1-59307-673-3 (US)
- OCLC: 72868042

Alice in Sunderland: An Entertainment is a 2007 graphic novel by comics writer and artist Bryan Talbot. It explores the links between Lewis Carroll and the Sunderland area, with wider themes of history, myth and storytelling. It was described in a review by Michel Faber as a "gloriously ambitious mix of myth, history and autobiography", and by Rachel Cooke as "one the most exhilarating books (she had) read in years" and "a minor masterpiece".

== Overview ==
The artwork for the main cover was drawn and made by graphic artist Jordan Smith. His daughter, Kaya Anna Lawson (Smith), is the model for Alice. She is featured on the front cover as Tenniel's Alice, as well as inside the book as her normal self.

The work relates local history. It focuses upon the eponymous city, but also covers other towns and cities in North East England, such as Newcastle upon Tyne, Durham and Hartlepool. Local legends and tales are documented, including the Lambton Worm and the monkey hanged in Hartlepool.

It is published in the UK by Jonathan Cape, and in the US by Dark Horse.

=== Pre-exhibition display ===
"Sunderland: The Exhibition" displayed work from the graphic novel, as well as exploring the various influences. It ran from 5 April to 1 July 2007 at The Cartoon Museum. In advance of publication, pages from the book were on display at the Northern Gallery for Contemporary art in Sunderland's City Library on Fawcett Street.

== Awards ==
- BSFA Award nominee, Best Novel
- 2008: Nominated for "Favourite Original Graphic Novel" Eagle Award
