= Grandville (comics) =

Graphic novel series by Bryan Talbot

- The front cover of Grandville, the first volume the Grandville series.
- Publisher: Jonathan Cape (UK); Dark Horse Comics (US); Milady (France); Comma 22 (Italy); Nicola Pesce Editore (Italy); Schreiber&Leser (Germany); Jemma Press (Greece); Astiberri (Spain); Comics Centrum (Czech Republic) Darkwood (Serbia)

Creative team
- Writers: Bryan Talbot
- Artists: Bryan Talbot

Original publication
- Issues: 5
- Date of publication: 15 October 2009 - November 2017
- Language: English

Grandville is a British graphic novel series written and drawn by Bryan Talbot. It is a mixture of the steampunk, alternative history and thriller genres. It is set in a world in which France won the Napoleonic Wars and invaded Britain, and in which the world is populated mostly by anthropomorphic animals. The main character is Detective Inspector Archibald "Archie" LeBrock of Scotland Yard, a British anthropomorphic badger.

The plot of the first book, entitled Grandville and published on 15 October 2009, sees LeBrock investigating a murder which leads him to visit "Grandville" (Paris) in order to solve the crime, which itself leads him to uncover a political conspiracy.

In the second volume, Grandville Mon Amour, published on 2 December 2010, LeBrock attempts to track down an escaped serial killer that he previously brought to justice. Grandville Bête Noire was published in 2012. The fourth volume, Grandville: Nöel, was published on 6 November 2014. The fifth and final volume, Grandville: Force Majeure, was released in November 2017.

== Development ==
Talbot writes in his book that Grandville is inspired by the work of Jean Ignace Isidore Gérard, who worked under the name J.J. Grandville, and Albert Robida. He states he is also inspired by Sir Arthur Conan Doyle, Rupert Bear and Quentin Tarantino. References are made to them in the book. For example, there is a building called "Robida Tower" and an early scene set in England takes place in a village called "Nutwood", the setting of the Rupert Bear stories.

Grandville makes several references to modern day political events. There are references to the war on terror, weapons of mass destruction and the September 11 attacks. In the first book, a fictional Parisian structure named the Robida Tower (referencing Albert Robida) is destroyed in an alleged suicide crash reminiscent of 9/11. The second book, Grandville Mon Amour is based on the themes of terrorism. The third, Grandville Bete Noir, has a science fiction theme, the fourth book centres on a religious cult. After departing the Eastern United States, the cult evolves into a brainwashing political party reminiscent of the Nazi Party. The fifth has a gangster theme.

The books contain references to other works, such as The Adventures of Tintin. In Bete Noire, a cameo is made by the character Professor Philip Mortimer, who is immediately killed off by the antagonist. Well-known anthropomorphic animal characters make cameo appearances and some of the panels are humorous nods to well-known 19th century paintings, such as The Absinthe Drinker by Edgar Degas, Paris Street; Rainy Day by Gustave Caillebotte, The Treachery of Images by Rene Magritte, Work by Ford Madox Brown and The Awakening Conscience by William Holman Hunt.

== Setting ==
Grandville is set in a steampunk world, featuring steam-powered road vehicles, air transport, robots (known as "automatons"), telephones (known as "voicepipes") and televisions. Although the setting strongly resembles the Belle Époque era at the end of the 19th century, the period is approximately the present day, 200 years after the Napoleonic Wars.

In this world, Britain lost the war with Napoleon, was invaded by France and the British royal family were guillotined. Britain was then ruled by France until twenty-three years before the start of the series, when Britain gained independence following "a prolonged campaign of civil disobedience and anarchist bombings." A consequence of some 180 years of French rule is that English only survives in rural communities, with the main language spoken in Britain being French.

The United States in this universe seems neutral in the Franco-British Cold War. In our timeline, Napoleonic France and the United States were allies, however, this universe depicts them as having also fought against French Imperialism. In regards to their flag, they seem to have replaced the Star Spangled Banner with the Seal of the United States. Appearing at the start of Noel, it resembles the World War I era of America, the police dress as they did at the start of the 20th century, and the U.S. Army soldiers dress similarly to WW1 doughboys.

Following independence, Britain became "The Socialist Republic of Britain" and is now linked to the French Empire by the Channel railway bridge. However, a considerable degree of animosity remained between French and British people. Paris, the capital of the French Empire, is the biggest city in the world, known by the nickname of "Grandville".

The vast majority of individuals in Grandville are anthropomorphic animals although humans do exist. Most French humans are from Angoulême (Note: In real life, the venue of the well-known, annual Angoulême International Comics Festival.) and are widely believed to be a subspecies of "hairless chimp" that evolved there comparatively recently. Referred to as "doughfaces", they have never gained citizens' rights and are not allowed passports to travel abroad. They are thought less intelligent and are mostly menial workers. Although small numbers live in other countries, there are none in Britain so they are unfamiliar to many British. A sub-plot of the third book involves a growing human civil-rights movement. The fourth book provides some backstory about humans and their historical relationship with other species.

== Main character ==
The main character in the series is Detective Inspector Archibald "Archie" LeBrock, a large, heavily built badger. He works for Scotland Yard and is assisted by Detective Roderick Ratzi, a dapper, monocle-wearing rat.

In the comics it is revealed that, as a youth, LeBrock was part of a British resistance group known as the "Brixton Irregulars". In his early years in the police he was previously married for two years to another badger, Florence, who was murdered by the psychopathic Cray twins. (Note: A reference to the real-life Kray twins) LeBrock killed one twin, Eugene, in revenge and in the line of duty; the other twin, Stanley, was jailed but it is mentioned in Grandville: Bête Noire that he is soon to be released. LeBrock has two children by Florence, boy and girl twins who live in Cumberland with LeBrock's mother and uncle for safety. In the original Grandville book LeBrock falls in love with Sarah Blairow, a badger performer at the Folies Bergère, who is murdered in the first book. He then falls in love again, with Billie, a prostitute, in Grandville: Mon Amour because of her strong resemblance to Sarah. In Noel, Billie reveals that she is pregnant with his child.

== Volumes ==
The first book was released in October 2009 as a hardback, published in the United Kingdom by Jonathan Cape and in the United States by Dark Horse Comics. Five books have been published in the series as hardback editions; in a 2014 interview, Talbot stated that the fifth book (Grandville: Force Majeure) will probably complete the series.

A spin-off, prequel volume set in the same universe and using some of the same characters - The Casebook of Stamford Hawksmoor - was subsequently published in November 2025.

Title	Publication date	Plot summary
Grandville	15 October 2009	Following the murder of British diplomat Raymond Leigh-Otter, LeBrock and Ratzi travel to Paris in order to find the killer. During their investigation they uncover a political conspiracy to start a new war between Britain and France.
Grandville Mon Amour	2 December 2010	Three weeks after the events of Grandville, LeBrock learns that old adversary, serial killer Edward "Mad Dog" Mastock (previously a hero of the British Revolution), has escaped from the Tower of London moments before his execution for murdering several prostitutes. After being told he is off the case due to his long absence, LeBrock quits his job to track down Mastock himself.
Grandville Bête Noire	9 December 2012	Ten weeks prior to the story, France experienced a revolution following the death of Emperor Napoleon XII and is now ruled by a Revolutionary Council. A cabal of industrialists and fat cats, led by the toad Baron Krapaud, secretly plot a violent counter-revolution using horribly beweaponed, automaton soldiers. Meanwhile, LeBrock and Ratzi are asked by a friend in the French police to come to Paris to help investigate the murder of a Parisian artist, mysteriously stabbed to death in his locked and guarded studio.
Grandville: Nöel	18 November 2014	Detective Inspector LeBrock of Scotland Yard again returns to Grandville. This time, he is following the trail of his housekeeper's 16-year-old niece, who has run away from home to join a religious cult. The cult leaders, a unicorn messiah and his con-men cronies, are already responsible for mass murder in the United States; they now have their sights set on a take over of political power in France.
Grandville: Force Majeure	14 November 2017	Tiberius Koenig, the most powerful Crime Lord in all of France, plans to take over the British Criminal Underworld, but first, revenge on LeBrock. LeBrock also clashes with British gangster Stanley Cray (the brother of his wife's murderer).

== Reception ==
The Grandville series has received positive reviews.

Ryan Agee from The Skinny gave the first volume, Grandville, four out of five stars, writing: "Corny puns abound, but this is a stunningly well drawn book with a compelling mystery, and a great detective team at it's [sic] heart. Great stuff."

Neel Mukherjee in The Times was also positive saying: "It's a playful, allusive book in which there's a witty touch or deliciously knowing in-joke on almost every page: the French press whipping up Anglophobia; LeBrock's Holmes-like unpacking of apparently innocent signs, which yield vital information, when he makes his first appearance; the drug-addled Milou/Snowy, dreaming of plotlines of Tintin books in his opium-induced stupors. The numerous fight sequences are simply cracking, especially the beautifully rendered sprays of blood and, throughout, the glossy gorgeousness fills your eyes."

Rich Johnston from Bleeding Cool wrote that: "I love this comic. It's big, bold, brash, insanely detailed and has badgers torturing frogs. There are steam powered carriages and robots, gratuitous violence, big explosions, lots of kicking, a decent ending and Inspector LeBrock finding himself a long, long way from Wind In the Willows. It can be appreciated on so many levels and with so many potential fanbases basically performing bukkake upon the pages, it should appeal to a lot of people. even those who have a problem with a talking snobby French fish butler with legs. Also, don't try to work out the evolutionary timelines. It will just mess with your head. But do enjoy."

Joe McCulloch from The Savage Critics was less positive however, writing: "This doesn't automatically lend itself to a tremendous amount of depth, frankly, and the somewhat stale, vengeful nature of Talbot's plot leaves it teetering on the edge of embarrassing-silly instead of fun-silly."

Grandville Mon Amour was reviewed by Michael Moorcock for The Guardian, who said "[a]lthough Talbot's narratives lack the complexity or originality of Alan Moore's, he brings a rare subtlety, even beauty, to his medium. His drawing is first class and his dialogue superb, adding credibility to his characterization while moving the story along at a laconic lick."

Grandville Mon Amour won the 2012 Prix SNCF for Best crime fiction in the Comics category.

Grandville Bête Noire has been nominated for the 2013 Hugo Award for best graphic story.

== Things to note ==
- There is a dog in the book called Snowy Milou ,possibly coming from The Adventures of Tintin. The author describes dreams he had with close relation to the Tintin series.
