= Bryan Talbot =

British comics artist and writer (born 1952)

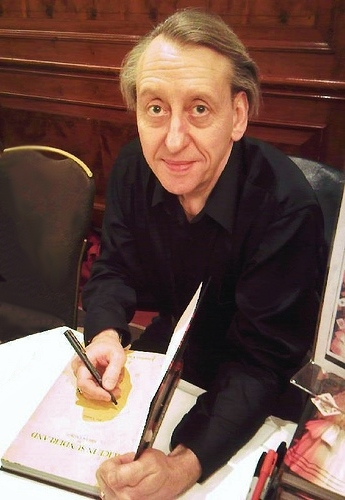
- Talbot signing Alice in Sunderland at Eastercon in England, 25 March 2008
- Born: 24 February 1952 (age 74) Wigan, Lancashire, England
- Areas: Writer, Penciller, Inker, Colorist
- Pseudonym: Véronique Tanaka
- Notable works: The Adventures of Luther Arkwright; Heart of Empire; Alice in Sunderland; The Tale of One Bad Rat; Grandville
- Awards: Eisner Award for Best Graphic Album: Reprint (1996); Haxtur Award for Best Long Comic Strip (1999); Inkpot Award (2000); Costa biography award (2012)

Bryan Talbot (born 24 February 1952) is a British comics artist and writer, best known as the creator of The Adventures of Luther Arkwright and its sequels Heart of Empire and The Legend of Luther Arkwright, as well as the Grandville series of books. He collaborated with his wife, Mary M. Talbot to produce Dotter of Her Father's Eyes, which won the 2012 Costa biography award.

== Early life ==
Bryan Talbot was born in Wigan, Lancashire, on 24 February 1952. He attended Wigan Grammar School, the Wigan School of Art, and Harris College in Preston, Lancashire, from which he graduated with a degree in Graphic Design.

== Career ==
Talbot began his comics work in the underground comix scene of the late 1960s. In 1969 his first work appeared as illustrations in Mallorn, the British Tolkien Society magazine, followed in 1972 by a weekly strip in his college newspaper. He continued in the scene after leaving college, producing Brainstorm Comix, the first three of which formed The Chester P. Hackenbush Trilogy, a character reworked by Alan Moore as Chester Williams for Swamp Thing.

Talbot started The Adventures of Luther Arkwright in 1978. It was originally published in Near Myths and continued on over the years in other publications, including Pssst! and by the publisher Valkyrie Press. It was eventually collected into one volume by Dark Horse Comics. Along with Raymond Briggs' When the Wind Blows, it is considered one of the first British graphic novels. In the early-to-mid 1980s Talbot provided art for some of 2000 AD's flagship serials, producing three series of Nemesis the Warlock, as well as occasional strips for Judge Dredd.

Talbot moved to the U.S. market in the 1990s and principally worked for DC Comics on titles such as Hellblazer, Batman: Legends of the Dark Knight, and Dead Boy Detectives. Talbot collaborated with Neil Gaiman on The Sandman and provided art for the "Fables & Reflections", "A Game of You", and "Worlds' End" story arcs. His The Tale of One Bad Rat (1994) deals with a girl's recovery from childhood sexual abuse. He drew The Nazz limited series which was written by Tom Veitch and worked with Tom's brother Rick Veitch on Teknophage, one of a number of mini-series he drew for Tekno Comix. Talbot has illustrated cards for the Magic: The Gathering collectible card game. He has illustrated Bill Willingham's Fables, as well as returning to the Luther Arkwright universe with Heart of Empire.

In 2006, he announced the graphic novel Metronome, an existential, textless erotically charged visual poem, written under the pseudonym Véronique Tanaka. He admitted that he was the author in 2009. Talbot turned down an offer to appear in character as Tanaka for an in-store signing of the work.

In 2007 he released Alice in Sunderland, which documents the connections between Lewis Carroll, Alice Liddell, and the Sunderland and Wearside area. He wrote and drew the layouts for Cherubs!, which he describes as "an irreverent fast-paced supernatural comedy-adventure."

In 2019 it was reported that Talbot was producing the third installment in the Arkwright series, titled The Legend of Luther Arkwright, which was published by Dark Horse in 2022.

In April 2024, it was announced that Talbot will be inducted into the Will Eisner Comic Awards Hall of Fame, the highest accolade for comic writers and artists from across the world.

== Awards and recognition ==
- 1985 Eagle Award for Favourite Character for Torquemada, from Nemesis the Warlock
- 1988:
  - Eagle Award for Favourite Artist (British)
  - Eagle Award for Favourite New Comic, for The Adventures of Luther Arkwright
  - Eagle Award for Favourite Character (UK), for Luther Arkwright
  - Eagle Award for Favourite Comic Cover, for The Adventures of Luther Arkwright
- 1989 Society of Strip Illustration Mekon Award for "Best British Work" for The Adventures of Luther Arkwright
- 1995 UK Comic Art Award for Best New Publication for The Tale of One Bad Rat
- 1996 Eisner Award for Best Graphic Album: Reprint, for The Tale of One Bad Rat
- 1999 Haxtur Award, for Best Long Comic Strip for The Tale of One Bad Rat
- 2000 Inkpot Award
- 2007:
  - BSFA Award nominee, Best Novel, for Alice in Sunderland
  - Nominated for "Award for Favourite Comics Writer/Artist" Eagle Award
  - Nominated for "Favourite Original Graphic Novel" Eagle Award, for Alice in Sunderland
- 2008: Nominated for "Best Painter or Multimedia Artist (interior art)" Eisner Award.
- 2009 Talbot was given an Honorary Doctorate of Arts by University of Sunderland in July 2009, the first time this has been done for a comic book artist.
- 2010: Nominated for "Favourite Original Graphic Novel Published During 2009" Eagle Award for Grandville
- 2012:
  - Talbot was awarded an Honorary Degree of Doctor of Letters on 17 July 2012 by Northumbria University in recognition of his lifetime's work in the graphic novel field.
  - Winner of the Costa biography award for Dotter of Her Father's Eyes, with Mary Talbot.
  - Prix SNCF for "Best Bande Dessinée 2012" for Grandville Mon Amour
- 2014: Guest of honor at NordicFuzzCon.
- 2018: Elected a Fellow of the Royal Society of Literature.

== Bibliography ==
=== 2000 AD ===
==== Tharg's Future Shocks ====
- "The Wages of Sin" (with Alan Moore, in 2000 AD No. 257, 1982)

==== Ro-Busters ====
- Ro-Busters: "Old Red Eyes is Back" (with Alan Moore, in 2000AD Annual 1983, 1982)

==== Nemesis the Warlock ====
- "The Gothic Empire (Book IV)" (in 2000 AD No. 390–406, 1984–1985)
- "Vengeance of Thoth (Book V)" (in 2000 AD No. 435–445, 1985)
- "Torquemurder (Book VI)" (in 2000 AD No. 482–487 and 500–504, 1986–1987)
- Torquemada: "The Garden of Alien Delights" (with Pat Mills, in Diceman No. 3, 1986)

==== Sláine ====
- "The Time Killer" (with Pat Mills, in 2000 AD No. 431, 1985)

==== Judge Dredd ====
- "House of Death" (with John Wagner/Alan Grant, in Diceman No. 1, 1986)
- "Last Voyage of the Flying Dutchman" (with John Wagner/Alan Grant, in 2000 AD No. 459, 1986)
- "Judge Dredd and the Seven Dwarves" (with John Wagner/Alan Grant, in Judge Dredd Annual 1987, 1986)
- "Ladies' Night" (with John Wagner/Alan Grant, in 2000AD Annual 1987, 1986)
- "Caterpillars" (script by Michael Carroll, coloured by Alwyn Talbot, in 2000 AD No. 1730, April 2011)

==== Enemy Alien ====
- "Enemy Alien" (with script and pencils Mike Matthews, in 2000AD Sci-Fi Special 1987)

==== Memento ====
- "Memento" (in 2000 AD Prog 2002, 2001)

=== Ad Astra ===
- Frank Fazakerly, Space Ace of the Future (October 1978 - September 1981)

=== Avatar Press ===
- Nightjar (with Alan Moore, in Alan Moore's Yuggoth Cultures and Other Growths No. 1, Avatar Press, 2003)

=== Brainstorm Comix ===
==== Chester P. Hackenbush, the Psychedelic Alchemist ====
- "Out of the Crucible", in Brainstorm Comix #1 (Alchemy, 1975)
- "From Here to Infinity", in Brainstorm Comix #2 (Alchemy, 1976)
- "A Streetcar Named Delirium", in Brainstorm Comix #4 (Alchemy, 1977)

==== Amazing Rock'n'Roll Adventures ====
- "The Omega Report", in Brainstorm Comix #6 (Alchemy, 1978)

=== Dark Horse Comics ===
- The Tale of One Bad Rat (1995, ISBN 1-56971-077-5)

=== DC Comics/Vertigo ===
- Hellblazer Annual No. 1 (written by Jamie Delano, 1989)
- The Nazz (written by Tom Veitch, issue #1 coloured by Steve Whittaker and issues #2-4 coloured by Les Dorscheid, 1990 - 1991)
- Batman: Dark Legends (reprints Batman: Legends of the Dark Knight No. 39 – 40, 50, 52 – 54, 1996, ISBN 1-85286-723-X)

==== The Sandman ====
- The Song of Orpheus (in Sandman Special 1, inks by Mark Buckingham, coloured by Daniel Vozzo, 1991)
- A Game of You (DC Comics, 1991–1992, ISBN 1-56389-089-5 )
- Fables and Reflections (DC Comics, 1991–1993, ISBN 1-56389-105-0 )
- Worlds' End (DC Comics, 1993, ISBN 1-56389-170-0)
- The Dreaming No. 9–12 (writer, with artists Dave Taylor (No. 9) and Peter Doherty (No. 10–12), DC Comics, February–May 1997)
- The Dead Boy Detectives (with Ed Brubaker, Vertigo, four-issue mini-series, 2001)

==== Shade, the Changing Man ====
- The Santa Fe Trail (written by Peter Milligan, inks by Mark Pennington, coloured by Daniel Vozzo, August 1991)

==== Fables ====
- Bag o’Bones (with Bill Willingham, Vertigo, 2004, ISBN 1-4012-0256-X)

=== Desperado Publishing ===
- Cherubs! (with Mark Stafford, graphic novel, 104 pages, Desperado Publishing, November 2007, ISBN 0-9795939-9-9)

=== Jonathan Cape ===
- Alice in Sunderland (graphic novel, Jonathan Cape, April 2007, ISBN 978-0-224-08076-7)
- Dotter of Her Father's Eyes (written by Mary M. Talbot, 2012)
- Sally Heathcote: Suffragette ( written by Mary Talbot, lettering, layouts and rough pencils by Bryan, finished artwork by Kate Charlesworth, 2014)
- The Red Virgin and the Vision of Utopia (written by Mary M. Talbot, 2016)
- Rain (Graphic Novel) (written by Mary M. Talbot, 2019)

==== Grandville ====
- Grandville (graphic novel, 104 pages, November 2009)
- Grandville Mon Amour (graphic novel, 104 pages, December 2010)
- Grandville Bête Noire (graphic novel, 104 pages, December 2012)
- Grandville: Nöel (graphic novel, Jonathan Cape, November 2014)
- Grandville: Force Majeure (graphic novel, Jonathan Cape, November 2017)

=== Luther Arkwright ===
- The Papist Affair (in The Mixed Bunch 1, 1976)
- The Adventures of Luther Arkwright (various publishers: 1978–1989, ISBN 1-56971-255-7)
- For A Few Gallons More (with Chris Welch, in Moon Comics 3, 1979 Street Comics)
- The Fire Opal of Set (in Imagine 14, 1984 TSR UK Ltd)
- Heart of Empire: Or the Legacy of Luther Arkwright (Dark Horse Comics, nine-issue limited series, 1999, ISBN 1-56971-567-X)
- The Legend of Luther Arkwright (Dark Horse Books, 2022, ISBN 9-781-50673-647-1)

=== Moonstone Books ===
- The Naked Artist: Comic Book Legends. Calumet City, Illinois: Moonstone Books. 2007. ISBN 978-1-933076-25-6.

=== NBM Publishing ===
- The Art of Bryan Talbot (96 pages, NBM Publishing, December 2007, ISBN 1-56163-512-X)
- Metronome (as Véronique Tanaka, 64 pages, NBM Publishing, May 2008, ISBN 1-56163-526-X)

=== Sounds ===
- Scumworld (credited to The Crabs from Uranus, 1983 – 1984)

=== Tekno Comix ===
- Neil Gaiman’s Mr. Hero the Newmatic Man (Issue #1, six pages pencils and inks, written by Rick Veitch, coloured by Angus McKie, 1995)
- Neil Gaiman’s Mr. Hero the Newmatic Man (Issue #2, five pages, inked by Angus McKie (1995, Tekno Comix Written by Rick Veitch, coloured by Angus McKie, 1995)
- Neil Gaiman’s Wheel of Worlds one shot, 11 pages (1995, Tekno Comix, written by Rick Veitch, coloured by Angus McKie,)
- Neil Gaiman's Teknophage (pencils only, written by Rick Veitch, Issues #1-6, 1995-1996)
- Neil Gaiman's Phage: Shadow Death (script, with pencils by David Pugh and inks by Tim Perkins, six-issue limited series, Tekno Comix, June–November 1996)

=== Other ===
- Superharris with Bonk in Hac, Harris College's Student Newspaper 1971 - 1972)
- Brainworms (script by Matthias Schultheiss, in Crisis presents the Second Xpresso Special, 1991)
