= Slab-O-Concrete =

Slab-O-Concrete Productions
- Company type: Comic book distributor, Comic book publisher
- Industry: Comics
- Founded: 1994
- Founder: Peter Pavement, Dave Hanna, Emma Copsey and Chris Tappenden
- Defunct: 2001
- Headquarters: Brighton and Hove, United Kingdom

Slab-O-Concrete Productions was a British mail order distributor and publisher, founded by Peter Pavement, Dave Hanna, Emma Copsey and Chris Tappenden; operating mostly in Brighton and Hove during the 1990s. Initially selling British small press comics and zines (including Pavement's own comics), Slab-O-Concrete also imported publications from the United States, Australia and Europe.

Slab-o-Concrete was originally based in Sheffield. It moved to Hove in 1995. After intensely increasing its publishing line in the late 1990s (including moving into CDs and prose books), it collapsed in 2001 as policy changes in the book industry caused cash-flow issues.

== History ==
In general, Slab-O-Concrete avoided distributing traditional comic books, instead making connections with underground publishers, zinesters, independent record labels, and other subcultural scenes.

By 1994, it had developed into a publisher, repackaging small press comics and zines for the bookshop market and originating new works. Notable creators published by Slab-O-Concrete included Jessica Abel, Ian Carney, Craig Conlan, Alan Moore, Woodrow Phoenix and Aleksandar Zograf.

In 1998, Slab-O-Concrete published four titles in partnership with Amnesty International. The comics were designed as 16-page minicomics with card stock covers, designed to be sealed and used as postcards. Ilya's A Bowl of Rice was about the forcible relocation and killing of Shan rice farmers in Burma. Enrique Rodríguez's Freedom from Discrimination was a story about maltreatment of and violence against street children in Brazil, and undocumented, unaccompanied immigrant children in the United States. Dan Jones' Just Deserts told the story of a female Filipino migrant worker's false conviction and punishment in Saudi Arabia. Peter Arkle's Love told the story of Mariana Cetiner, a Romanian woman arrested and imprisoned for allegedly attempting to seduce another woman. In 1999, Slab-O-Concrete published another 16-page mailable minicomic called Donna's Day, by Donna Mathes and Peter Bagge.

One of their its publications, in 1999, was The Worm: the Longest Comic Strip in the World, by Alan Moore and a "galaxy of greats", which was published in association with the Cartoon Art Trust and the Swedish Council for Cultural Affairs. "In one single working day, over 125 British cartoonists gathered together in one place to create 'the longest comic [wordless] strip in the world.'" The Worm had introductions and explanatory text in English, Swedish and French.

== Titles published ==
=== Music ===
- Jackpot - Songs And Art, (7" with art book) Jad Fair and Jason Willett (1997)
- 17%: Hendrix Was Not the Only Musician!, by Billy Childish & His Famous Headcoats (1998)
- The Attack of Everything, by Jad Fair and Jason Willett (2000)

=== Comics ===
- Amnesty International minicomics
  - A Bowl of Rice, by Ilya (1998) — published in partnership with Amnesty International
  - Freedom from Discrimination, by Enrique Rodríguez (1998) — published in partnership with Amnesty International
  - Just Deserts, by Dan Jones (1998) — published in partnership with Amnesty International
  - Love, by Peter Arkle (1998) — published in partnership with Amnesty International
- Anarchy in the UK: the Comic (1994)
- Artbabe in Pigskin vs Paintbrush!, by Jessica Abel (1999)
- Assume Nothing: Starring Liliane: Evolution of a Bi-Dyke, by Leanne Franson (1997)
- Axis Mundi, by Ian Carney and Garry Marshall (2000)
- Bad Hair Day, by Craig Conlan (1997)
- Bulletins from Serbia: E-mails and Cartoon Strips from Beyond the Front Line, by Aleksandar Zograf (1999)
- Cheap Date: Antidotal Anti-Fashion, by Peter Blake (2000)
- Daddy is So Far Away, We Must Find Him!, by Wostok and Grabowski (1998)
- Doc Trader, by Jessica Abel (2000)
- Dole Scum: Co-starring Bunny Girl and Pig Boy, by Nigel Auchterlounie (2000)
- Donna's Day, by Donna Mathes and Peter Bagge (1999)
- Dream Bytes, by Lee Kennedy (1994) — ongoing series
- Dream Watcher: Comics, by Aleksandar Zograf (1998)
- Eager Beaver (Missive Device), by Ian Carney and Woodrow Phoenix (1999, ISBN 1-899866-93-0)
- The End of the Century Club: Countdown, by Ed Hillyer (1999, ISBN 0-9527386-0-0)
- Excreta: Stories of Bodily Fluids, by Ole Comoll Christensen (1999)
- Fishbowl #1 (1994), #2 (1995), by Chris Tappenden
- Floozie, by Jane Graham (1998)
- Gash, by Soren Mosdal (2000)
- The GirlFrenzy Aillennial: a Big Girl's Annual, by Erica Smith (1998)
- The Great Challenge: an International Anthology of Political Cartoons (1998) — exhibition catalogue to accompany the Great Challenge held at Oxo Tower Wharf, London, 1998
- Hairy Mary: Fun Fur, by Craig Conlan (1999)
- Hairy Mary: Grrrl, by Craig Conlan (1999)
- Handy Hints for a Consumer Society, by Chris Tappenden (1995)
- Liberty Fernando: a Story of Zits & Revolution, by Ole Comoll Christensen (1999)
- Lux and Alby: Sign on & Save the Universe, by Martin Millar and Simon Fraser, with lettering by Ali Kirkpatrick (1999)
- Meet John Dark, by Darryl Cunningham and Simon Gane (1998)
- Pavement (issues #0, 1-3; title changed to Pavement Pizza for issue #4), edited by Peter Pavement, with contributions by Pavement, Dave Hanna, Lawrence Burton, Adeline Wartner, Paul John, Welly, Andy Hemingway, Renée French, and Chris Tappenden (1990–1994)
- The Plot Thickens (1997) — published with Brighton-based Armchair Comics
- Punk Strips, by Simon Gane (2000)
- Schwa, by Bill Barker (1995)
- Simon Cat in "Taxi", by Nigel Auchterlounie (1999)
- The Slab-O-Concrete Sampler, (1990) edited by Peter Pavement
- The Slab-O-Concrete Inactivity Book, edited by Woodrow Phoenix and Craig Conlan (2000, ISBN 1-899866-42-6)
- The Slab Selection, edited by Peter Pavement (1996, ISBN 1-899866-03-5)
- Spiral Dreams, by Al Davison (2000)
- Sugar Buzz: Live at Budokan!, by Woodrow Phoenix (1999, ISBN 1-899866-33-7)
- Teaching Through Trauma, by Leanne Franson (1999)
- Time Warp: The End of the Century Club, by Ed Hillyer (1999, ISBN 1-899866-20-5)
- Windy Wilberforce in The Saga of the Scroll, by Ed Pinsent (1995, ISBN 1-899866-00-0)
- Witch, by Lorna Miller (1999)
- The Worm: the Longest Comic Strip in the World, by Alan Moore and a "galaxy of greats" (1999)
- XXX (Strip) Burger, by Stripburger magazine (1999)

=== Prose ===
- Below Critical Radar: Fanzines and Alternative Comics from 1976 to the Present Day, edited by Roger Sabin & Teal Triggs (2000, ISBN 1-899866-47-7)
- Billy Childish: & His Famous Headcoats; Hendrix Was Not the Only Musician, by Billy Childish (1998)
- Cometbus, by Aaron Cometbus (1999) — zine
- Ground Level (1994) — zine about alternative comics
- Little Girl Blues, by Lee Kennedy (1994) – zine
- Spy TV: Just Who is the Digital TV Revolution Overthrowing?, by David Burke (2000)
- Towards 2012: the Journal of Millennial Mutation
  - Part 2, Psychedelica (1996)
  - Part 3, Culture and Language, by Gyrus T. Features, et al. (1997)
