= Where's It At, Sugar Kat? =

Comic book series by Woodrow Phoenix and Ian Carney

Where's It At, Sugar Kat? is a humorous action comic book series created by Woodrow Phoenix and Ian Carney, published by Slave Labor Graphics. Sugar Kat is a supermodel and the most popular girl in the world. Rebecca is Sugar's brainy (and sometimes jealous) twin sister. Together (along with Rebecca's cat Yearbook) they are the Kat and Kat Detective Agency and their specialty is supernatural mysteries.

Drawn and written in a style that mixes Betty and Veronica with Hellboy, the underlying themes are the criticism of the cult of celebrity and racial stereotyping, subverting pop culture icons and cultural figures in comedic ways.

Where's It At, Sugar Kat? first appeared in the third issue of SugarBuzz! in 1998. Since then there has been a one-shot special crossover with Andi Watson's Skeleton Key and a three-issue miniseries, collected later in a trade paperback edition. A 32-page story appears in the 2004 SugarBuzz collection, SugarBuzz! Your Ticket to Happiness.

== Film and television ==
Where's It At, Sugar Kat? was optioned by The Walt Disney Corporation in 2000 with Carney and Phoenix as consultants. It was in development for four years as a live action show and then using stop motion animation. Despite several scripts and production of test footage, no finished product resulted. It has since been optioned again by an independent production company.

== Characters ==
- Sugar Kat

Sugar is the most popular girl in the world, described as a combination of Britney Spears and Jesus, due to her magical powers of attractiveness. She is irresistible to every creature in the world except for evil people, ghosts and monsters. She doesn't really do anything with this power and is content to be fabulously wealthy as the world's most popular celebrity supermodel.

- Rebecca Kat

Rebecca is Sugar's twin sister. She is the only person in the world who is unaffected by Sugar's magical attractiveness and resents having to live in Sugar's shadow. An over-achiever who has mastered all martial arts and speaks a dozen languages while curing the common cold, Rebecca is a super-intelligent private eye who takes on cases that prove too weird for normal investigators. Originally working solo, Rebecca is dismayed when Sugar decides to join her in the Kat Detective Agency because once again she will be unable to control her life. However, Sugar's powers are often useful on cases.

- Yearbook

Yearbook is the girls' pet cat. He got his name because his hair sticks up just like Rebecca's did in her class of '81 yearbook photo. He is a scaredy cat who faints whenever there is trouble and must be revived by artificial respiration. His true heroic nature is shown in the Skeleton Key/Sugar Kat crossover where his spirit is revealed to be that of a black panther.

- Mr and Mrs Kat

Not much has been revealed about Mr and Mrs Kat so far. He looks like a groovy African-American male with an afro and a mustache reminiscent of The Mod Squad. She looks like Samantha from Bewitched, which might explain Sugar's magical powers of attraction.

== Sugar Kat comics ==
- Sugar Buzz! #3 (1998)
- The Skeleton Key/Sugar Kat special (1998), with Andi Watson
- Sugar Buzz: Live at Budokan! (Slab-O-Concrete, 1999). ISBN 978-1-899866-33-5
- Multivitaminé (La Comedie Illustré, 2000)
- Where's it at Sugar Kat? #1 (2002)
- Where's it at Sugar Kat? #2-3 (2003)
- Where's it at Sugar Kat: The Thin Of the Land (2003). ISBN 978-0-943151-56-4
- SugarBuzz! Your Ticket to Happiness (2004). ISBN 978-1-59362-008-0
