= Skeleton Key (comics) =

1995 comic book by Andi Watson

Skeleton Key is the title of a comic book by British author Andi Watson. It was published beginning in 1995 by Slave Labor Graphics and was Watson's first monthly comic. Skeleton Key ran for 30 issues and a number of supplemental stories and was generally well received. The 30 issues were subsequently collected in five volumes.

== Comic ==
Skeleton Key featured detailed black and white art. Its plot centered on two young women. The first protagonist is Tamsin, a high-school student living in Canada, who discovers the magical skeleton key that lends the series its title. This key can fit any door, and it "unlocks" pathways to other dimensions. While exploring these alternate worlds, she encounters the second protagonist, Kitsune, a Japanese fox spirit. The earlier volumes in the series deal primarily with the adventures of the pair in these alternate worlds, while in the later volumes, the fantasy elements become less prominent and the drama and romance of coming-of-age stories takes center stage.

In 2011 Watson returned to Skeleton Key with a series of short stories for Dark Horse Presents, an anthology title. These were collected in the "Skeleton Key Color Special", published as a one shot in 2012 from Dark Horse Comics.

== Cartoon ==
An animated series based on the comic book was ordered in 2001 by Nickelodeon. The animated series was to be produced by Sunbow Entertainment for an initial run of 13 episodes. However, the series never materialized.

== Collected editions ==
- Skeleton Key, Vol. 1: Beyond the Threshold (ISBN 0-943151-12-0)
- Skeleton Key, Vol. 2: The Celestial Calendar (ISBN 0-943151-15-5)
- Skeleton Key, Vol. 3: Telling Tales (ISBN 0-943151-13-9)
- Skeleton Key, Vol. 4: Cats and Dogs (ISBN 0-943151-19-8)
- Skeleton Key, Vol. 5: Roots (ISBN 0-943151-26-0)
- Skeleton Key Special collected short stories and mini-comics
- Kitsune Tales one-shot, with writer Woodrow Phoenix (ISBN 0-943151-79-1)
- Skeleton Key/Sugar Kat Special crossover with Ian Carney and Woodrow Phoenix's Where's It At, Sugar Kat?
- Skeleton Key Missive Device a book of mini-comics in postcard form
- Skeleton Key Color Special one-shot, 32 pages, 2012 published by Dark Horse Comics
