= Alison Sampson =

English writer, illustrator and architect

Alison Sampson is a British artist, illustrator and architect. She is known for her work with Marvel Comics, DC Comics, Image Comics, and Dark Horse. She has provided illustrations for Hellboy, Wolverine and Bloodlines as well as for Sleeping Beauties and Hit-Girl. Her work covers a broad range, but she is mostly drawn to supernatural or horror themes.

== Career ==
=== Architecture ===
Alison Sampson was born in Yorkshire, and initially studied design and architecture at The Bartlett School, London, going on to become an architect for 25 years. Between 1997 and 2010 she was a guest lecturer at Cambridge University, and also at The Bartlett School, University College, London, and the Architectural Association.

=== Comics ===
Sampson enjoyed comics as a child and cites 2000AD and Carlos Ezquerra’s depiction of Judge Dredd as early influences on her art. After having lost interest for a time, she was once again drawn to comics after reading Watchmen. In about 2010, the artist Rob Davis suggested to Sampson that she should create her own comic. The result (a comic about architecture), was published in Solipsistic Pop 4. This led to an offer of work from Nathan Edmondson, which eventually led to the project that became Genesis.

Sampson says of her study of architecture:

It is the biggest influence on my work. I’ve been doing architecture work for so long, the practices are ingrained in my mind and I cannot help but look at comics and think of them like I would think of architecture. Even the way the art is drawn, with a fine black pen, in quite a utilitarian way is like architecture. I think about how the spaces work, how they relate to each other and how they join, or do not join. I think about the lighting and the composition and the scale, and all sorts of things. Quite a lot of my experience is in large projects as well, and that really helps dealing with controlled chaos on the page. Cities, landscapes and large architectural projects all have to be landscaped, to some extent, and the comic page is no different.

The success of Genesis led to a number of new commissions, including drawing and writing comics, illustrating comics covers, creating T-shirt designs and posters. She has also taught workshops and courses at various institutions.

In 2018 Sampson was commissioned to create a poster and assets for BBC R4's We British for National Poetry Day.

In 2024 she was announced as the first British woman to write for Marvel Comics.

As of 2025, Sampson still works as an architect.

== Personal life ==
Sampson is the niece of the Booker-shortlisted writer J. L. Carr, and cites his influence in her own work and her early love of poetry. She lives and works in London.

== Awards ==
- British Comic Awards: Best Emerging Talent (2014)
- Broken Frontier Award: Best Anthology; Let Her Be Evil (2024)
- Clampett Humanitarian Award (2025) with Prof. John Yoder, as part of a fundraiser making L.A. Strong, for Mad Cave Comics
- Will Eisner Nomination for Best Continuing Series; The Department of Truth (2023)
- Will Eisner Nomination for Best Adaptation From Another Medium; Tori Amos: Little Earthquakes (2023)
- Will Eisner Nomination for Best Anthology: Tori Amos; Little Earthquakes (2023)
- Will Eisner Nomination for Best Anthology; Cruel Universe (2025)
- Will Eisner Nomination for Best Continuing Series; Department of Truth (2025)

== Bibliography ==
- Women of Marvel. Marvel Comics. 2025. ASIN B0DNTQHPGN.
- Epitaphs From the Abyss, #6. Oni Press. 2025. ISBN 978-1637158142.
- The Department of Truth, #25. Image Comics. 2024. ISBN 979-8368851839.
- The Department of Truth, #26. Image Comics. 2024. ISBN 979-8368858920.
- The Department of Truth, #27. Image Comics. 2024. ISBN 979-8368859255.
- Cruel Universe, #4. Oni Press. 2024. ISBN 979-8894889887.
- Sleeping Beauties. IDW Comics. 2024. ISBN 979-8887241524.
- Hellboy and the BPRD 1957. Dark Horse Comics. 2023. ISBN 978-1506744568.
- Werewolf by Night. Marvel Comics. 2023. ISBN 978-1302530129.
- The Department of Truth, #16. Image Comics. 2023. ASIN B09KMFZRT2.
- Tori Amos: Little Earthquakes. Z2 Comics. 2022. ISBN 978-1954928619.
- Hit-Girl: India. Image Comics. 2021. ISBN 978-1534315488.
- Winnebago Graveyard. Image Comics. 2017. ISBN 978-1534303423.
- Genesis GN. Image Comics. 2014. ASIN B015XDG4LW.
