= Blank Slate Books =

UK-based publishing company founded in 2008

- Status: Defunct, c. 2016
- Founded: 2008
- Founders: Kenny Penman and James Hamilton
- Country of origin: United Kingdom
- Headquarters location: London
- Distribution: Turnaround Publisher Services
- Key people: Kenny Penman, Iz Rips
- Publication types: Books, comic books
- Imprints: Chalk Marks
- Official website: www.blankslatebooks.co.uk

Blank Slate Books (BSB) was a publishing company based in the United Kingdom. It published primarily comic books, graphic novels and comic strip collections, with an emphasis on new work by British artists and translated work by European artists. The books it published were noted for their "indie-friendly" content, and were frequently by small press artists whose initial work was self-published. The name of the company was a pun on "drawing" or "writing" on a blackboard.

BSB was one of the few dedicated original comics and graphic novel publishers in the UK.

== History ==
Blank Slate Books (BSB) was founded in 2008 by Kenny Penman and partner James Hamilton. Penman was inspired by Fantagraphics Books of Seattle, WA, to publish books in the United Kingdom that would do for artists in Britain what Fantagraphics was doing in the US, championing independent, alternative creators who were not working in superhero or other ‘mainstream’ commercial comics genres. Penman was co-director of Forbidden Planet International, and had plenty of experience with the comics industry. He saw the mission of BSB as "supporting home-grown talent" and providing an essential outlet for work that might not be seen elsewhere. He was primarily motivated to begin the company after encountering the work of Oliver East, who had no real precedents in UK comics.

The publication of Trains Are Mint by East was BSB's first release in 2008 and was critically acclaimed, with an Ignatz award nomination following soon after publication.

Other notable releases were Psychiatric Tales by Darryl Cunningham, another non-genre work which was featured on Radio 4, in many newspaper articles, and eventually republished in the USA. The "collective graphic novel" Nelson, edited by Rob Davis and Woodrow Phoenix, was an experiment that became The Observer newspaper's Graphic Novel of The Month, November 2011. The Times newspaper awarded it Best Graphic Novel of 2011, it was nominated for an Eisner Award, and was voted Book of The Year in the British Comic Awards 2012.

Penman's other mission was to introduce titles from European countries to the UK that otherwise might not be seen. He focused primarily upon German titles by creators such as Mawil, Line Hoven, and Ule Osterle, who starred in Germany but little known in the UK. BSB published six to eight books a year.

In 2012 Woodrow Phoenix, himself an acclaimed author of graphic novels, became art director of the company, supervising BSB's design and production.

Blank Slate Books ceased publishing around 2016.

== Titles ==
=== Graphic novels ===
- Berlin and That (vol. 3) by Oliver East (2010) ISBN 9781906653071
- Death & The Girls by Donya Todd (Aug 2012) ISBN 9781906653569
- Dinopopolous by Nick Edwards (Aug 2011) ISBN 978-1906653521
- The Girl and the Gorilla by Madéleine Flores (2010) ISBN 9781906653095
- Kochi Wanaba by Jamie Smart (Mar 2012) ISBN 9781906653255
- A Long Day of Mr. James — Teacher by James Harvey (2011) ISBN 978-1906653538
- My Skateboard Life by Ed Syder (2011) ISBN 9781906653118
- Peepholes by Laurie J. Proud (2011) ISBN 9781906653248
- Playing Out by Jim Medway (Aug 2012) ISBN 9781906653576
- Proper Go Well High by Oliver East (2008) ISBN 9781906653026
- Psychiatric Tales by Darryl Cunningham (2010) ISBN 9781906653088
- Spleenal (vol. 6 of Slate) by Nigel Auchterlounie (2009) ISBN 9781906653064
- The Suitcase by Dan Berry (2012) ISBN 9781906653583
- The Survivalist by Box Brown (2011) ISBN 9781906653552
- Swear Down by Oliver East (Dec 2012) ISBN 9781906653293
- Take Away by Lizz Lunney (Apr 2014) ISBN 9781906653422
- Trains Are... Mint by Oliver East (2008) ISBN 9781906653002
- Weak As I Am (vol. 3) by Nigel Auchterlounie (2015) ISBN 978-1-90665319-4

=== Collections and anthologies ===
- The Accidental Salad by Joe Decie (2011) ISBN 9781906653507
- Alby Figgs by Warren Pleece (June 2014) ISBN 9781906653460
- Hugo Tate by Nick Abadzis (2012) ISBN 9781906653262
- The Listening Agent by Joe Decie (2013) ISBN 9781906653590
- Nelson, edited by Rob Davis and Woodrow Phoenix (2011) ISBN 978-1906653231 — contributors include Kate Charlesworth, Garen Ewing, Duncan Fegredo, Sarah McIntyre, and Suzy Varty
- Uncle Bob Adventures vol. 1 by Darryl Cunningham (Nov 2013)
- Uncle Bob Adventures vol. 2 by Darryl Cunningham (June 2014) ISBN 978-1906653316

=== Translations ===
- The Band by Mawil (2011) ISBN 9781906653156
- Departures by Pierre Maurel (Apr 2012) ISBN 9781906653279
- Luchadoras by Peggy Adam (2011) ISBN 9781906653125
- Hector Umbra by Uli Oesterle, translated by Iz Rips (2011) ISBN 9781906653163
- Home & Away by Mawil (2011) ISBN 978-1906653224
- Love Looks Away by Line Hoven (2013) ISBN 9781906653187
- Sleepyheads by Randall C. (2011) ISBN 9781906653101
- Sparky O’Hare, Master Electrician by Mawil (2008) ISBN 9781906653033
- We Can Still Be Friends by Mawil (2008) ISBN 9781906653019

=== Other books ===
- Felt Mistress: Creature Couture by Woodrow Phoenix (2012) ISBN 978-1-906653-32-3
