= Tee and Mo =

Animated children's television series

- Created by: Dominic Minns
- Narrated by: Lauren Laverne (UK); Caroly Larson (Canada)
- Countries of origin: United Kingdom; Canada
- Original language: English
- No. of seasons: 2
- No. of episodes: 70

Production
- Running time: 7 minutes
- Production companies: Plug-In Media; Zodiak Kids & Family; Radical Sheep Productions; Keyframe Animation; Serious Lunch

Original release
- Network: CBeebies (United Kingdom); TVO (Canada)
- Release: 11 October 2014 – 23 July 2019

Tee and Mo is an animated children's television series. Starting as a series of games and shorts on the CBeebies website in 2013, production of a 50-episode series was ordered in 2014, first airing in 2018.

== Plot ==
This is the story of a monkey mother, Mo, and her three-year-old boy, Tee. Each episode is a story of how they navigate their daily life around the jungle tree. The stories are narrated by radio broadcaster Lauren Laverne in the UK and Caroly Larson in Canada.

== Characters ==
- Tee is a three-year-old monkey. He likes to have fun and go on adventures. He cares a lot about his mum, Mo. His favourite toy is a stuffed monkey called Action Ape.
- Mo is a monkey and Tee's mother. She is clever and unstoppable.

== Episodes ==
=== Series 1 (2014–15) ===
| No. in series | Title | Written by | Original release date |
|---|---|---|---|
| 1 | "Face Wipe" | Ian Carney | TBA |
| 2 | "The Box" | Will Brenton | TBA |
| 3 | "Rocket" | Steve Middleton | TBA |
| 4 | "Surprise!" | Steve Middleton | TBA |
| 5 | "Picture" | Ian Carney | TBA |
| 6 | "Action Ape" | Ian Carney | TBA |
| 7 | "Cold" | Sam Morrison | TBA |
| 8 | "Shelves" | Jo Clegg | TBA |
| 9 | "Tee's Garden" | Ian Carney | TBA |
| 10 | "Ouchy" | Ian Carney | TBA |
| 11 | "Costume" | Carol Commisso | TBA |
| 12 | "The Park" | Will Brenton | TBA |
| 13 | "Perfume" | Steve Middleton | TBA |
| 14 | "Puzzle" | Carol Commisso | TBA |
| 15 | "Noing!" | Kay Stonham | TBA |
| 16 | "Baby Tee" | Ian Carney | TBA |
| 17 | "Tickle" | Ian Carney | TBA |
| 18 | "Camp Out" | Carol Commisso | TBA |
| 19 | "Mo for a Morning" | Ian Carney | TBA |
| 20 | "Phone" | Chris Parker | TBA |
| 21 | "Mo's new Bed" | Ian Carney | TBA |
| 22 | "Where Did You Last See Him?" | John Van Bruggen | TBA |
| 23 | "Spinny Disc" | Ian Carney | TBA |
| 24 | "Grumpy" | John Van Bruggen | TBA |
| 25 | "Mega Action Ape" | Ian Carney | TBA |
| 26 | "Zoom!" | Ian Carney | TBA |
| 27 | "Treasure Hunt" | Steve Middleton | TBA |
| 28 | "My Turn" | Jasper Gibson | TBA |
| 29 | "Do it Myself" | Ian Carney | TBA |
| 30 | "Tent Kite" | Steve Middleton | TBA |
| 31 | "Car" | Carol Commisso | TBA |
| 32 | "Tomato" | Jasper Gibson | TBA |
| 33 | "Dino Tee" | Ian Carney | TBA |
| 34 | "Umbrella" | John Van Bruggen | TBA |
| 35 | "Workout" | John Van Bruggen | TBA |
| 36 | "Dance" | Will Brenton | TBA |
| 37 | "Piano" | Steve Middleton | TBA |
| 38 | "Big Boy Tee" | Ian Carney | TBA |
| 39 | "Action Ape Did it!" | Ian Carney | TBA |
| 40 | "Den" | John Van Bruggen | TBA |
| 41 | "Hurry Up!" | Steve Middleton | TBA |
| 42 | "Need a Carry" | Ian Carney | TBA |
| 43 | "Stay Up Late" | Ian Carney | TBA |
| 44 | "The Best" | Jayne Kirkham | TBA |
| 45 | "Tee's Shop" | Ian Carney | TBA |
| 46 | "Splash!" | Ian Carney | TBA |
| 47 | "Carpe" | Jo Clegg | TBA |
| 48 | "Bike" | Ian Carney | TBA |
| 49 | "Helpful Tee" | Carol Commisso | TBA |
| 50 | "Best Day Ever" | Ian Carney | TBA |

=== Series 2 (2019) ===
| No. in series | Title | Written by | Original release date |
|---|---|---|---|
| 1 | "Mo's Birthday" | Ian Carney & Dominic Minns | TBA |
| 2 | "Hero Time" | Ian Carney & Dominic Minns | TBA |
| 3 | "Garf!" | Ian Carney & Dominic Minns | TBA |
| 4 | "Swapsy" | Ian Carney & Dominic Minns | TBA |
| 5 | "Kapow! Pew! Pew! Pew!" | Ian Carney & Dominic Minns | TBA |
| 6 | "Sea" | Ian Carney & Dominic Minns | TBA |
| 7 | "Tee can do it" | Ian Carney & Dominic Minns | TBA |
| 8 | "Mission Unwakable" | Ian Carney & Dominic Minns | TBA |
| 9 | "Saving Action Ape" | Ian Carney & Dominic Minns | TBA |
| 10 | "Remote" | Ian Carney & Dominic Minns | TBA |
| 11 | "Music can be fun" | Ian Carney & Dominic Minns | TBA |
| 12 | "New Friends" | Ian Carney & Dominic Minns | TBA |
| 13 | "Queuing" | Ian Carney & Dominic Minns | TBA |
| 14 | "Scarecrow" | Ian Carney & Dominic Minns | TBA |
| 15 | "Winning" | Ian Carney & Dominic Minns | TBA |
| 16 | "Waiting" | Ian Carney & Dominic Minns | TBA |
| 17 | "Party" | Ian Carney & Dominic Minns | TBA |
| 18 | "Come on Mo!" | Ian Carney & Dominic Minns | TBA |
| 19 | "Worm" | Ian Carney & Dominic Minns | TBA |
| 20 | "Outside" | Ian Carney & Dominic Minns | TBA |

== Broadcast ==
| Country | Channel |
|---|---|
| UK | CBeebies |
| AUS | CBeebies |
| USA | Universal Kids |
| CAN | TVOKids, Knowledge Kids |
| UAE | E-Junior |
| FRA | M6, Gulli, Boing |
| GER | KIKA, Nick Jr. |
| ESP | Clan TVE, Canal Panda |
| BEL | Ketnet Junior |
| POR | Canal Panda, RTP2, SIC K |
| ITA | Rai YoYo |
| POL | MiniMini+ |
| RUS | Channel One Russia, Boing |
| BRA | Nat Geo Kids |
| IND | Disney Channel |
| JPN | TV Asahi |
