= Afterlife Inc. =

Comic book series

- The Afterlife Inc. board of directors. Art by Ash Jackson and Nathan Ashworth.

Publication information
- Publisher: Big Punch Studios
- Format: Ongoing series
- Publication date: April 2011 - ongoing
- Main character: Jack Fortune

Creative team
- Created by: Jon Lock
- Written by: Jon Lock
- Artist(s): Ash Jackson; Roy Huteson Stewart; Jack Tempest; Davide Tinto; Kit Palmer; James Lawrence; Eve Greenwood; V. V. Glass
- Letterer(s): Shawn DePasquale; Michael Stock; Lucy Lock
- Colorist(s): Nathan Ashworth; V. V. Glass

Collected editions
- Volume 1: Dying to Tell: ISBN 978-0-95716-670-7
- Volume 2: Near Life: ISBN 978-0-95716-671-4
- The Heavenly Chord: ISBN 978-0-95716-678-3
- Volume 3: Lifeblood: ISBN 978-0-95716-674-5
- Volume 4: Man Made God: ISBN 978-0-99316-100-1
- Volume 5: Glory Days: ISBN 978-0-99316-102-5
- The Book of Life: ISBN 978-0-95716-677-6

Afterlife Inc. is a British comic book series created by Jon Lock, and published by Big Punch Studios. The series centres upon deceased con-artist Jack Fortune and his efforts to modernise the afterlife as CEO of the eponymous company Afterlife Inc.

== Publication history ==
Afterlife Inc. began publication online in April 2011 as a series of short stories on creator Jon Lock's personal website. A collection of those first stories was released as Afterlife Inc. Volume 1: Dying to Tell in February 2012, with a second volume, Afterlife Inc. Volume 2: Near Life, following later that year.

Afterlife Inc. Volume 3: Lifeblood was released in November 2013, following a successful Kickstarter campaign (being one of the first UK comics to be funded on the platform). This also signalled a shift in the series from shorter, interconnected stories to a single long-form narrative. Afterlife Inc. Volume 4: Man Made God and Afterlife Inc. Volume 5: Glory Days were released in 2016 and 2019 respectively, also following successful crowdfunding campaigns, to critical praise.

In 2014, Volume 1 was included in Comixology's 'SXSW 2014 Submit Starter Pack', which featured the top 100 independent titles on the platform. 2014 also saw the publication of The Book of Life, a hardback omnibus collecting the first three volumes of the series, and The Heavenly Chord, a crossover with creator Nich Angell's 7STRING, that would lead to the founding of Big Punch Studios and its shared universe. Later that year, Afterlife Inc. was long-listed for Best Comic at the British Comic Awards.

In 2016, with the release of Volume 4, the series was relaunched as a free webcomic. In October 2019, Afterlife Inc. was featured at the Cheltenham Literature Festival, at which Lock spoke about the origins of the series and the process of creating independent comics.

As of 2020, Lock has stated that Volume 6 is currently in production.

== Plot ==
Con-artist Jack Fortune dies and discovers an afterlife in chaos following a mysterious event known as the Calamity. With the afterlife's infrastructure in ruins following the disappearance of its former rulers, the seven archangels, Jack decides to take over and transform the afterlife into a modern corporate entity. He is aided by Lux, a former soldier angel; Mr Ochroid, an angel made of gold wire with administrative skills; Nuriel, a giant lion-headed angel; Temperance Jones, a lowly worker angel and founder of the afterlife's first trade union; Elizabeth, a fellow human; Anahel, the last surviving archangel; and the angel App, Jack's overpowered bodyguard.

The series begins in media res, with Afterlife Inc. already established as the afterlife's new ruling body. Early volumes explore the relationship between the company and the beings that fall under its care. As the series progresses, more details of Jack's past are revealed and the ethics of his actions are called into question. A key mystery of the series is the fate of the lost archangels and a sinister conspiracy developing in the shadows.

=== Volume 1: Dying to Tell ===
Volume 1 consists of a series of one-off stories exploring the lives and after-lives of people in the afterlife, and serves as an introduction to the world and its themes. At the same time, Afterlife Inc. investigates a serial killer who is loose in the afterlife, with assistance from fictional detective Sherlock Holmes.

=== Volume 2: Near Life ===
Volume 2 continues the themes of the first book with more short stories exploring the lives of the afterlife's inhabitants. Afterlife Inc. also contends with Project Otherside, a clandestine branch of the United States Armed Forces, which attempts to invade the afterlife with the aid of Jon Antrobus, a man with godlike powers who holds a strange connection to the world of the dead. In the final pages, it is revealed that an organisation called the Council of Days (a reference to G. K. Chesterton's The Man Who Was Thursday) is plotting in secret to overthrow Afterlife Inc.

=== The Heavenly Chord ===
Zachary Briarpatch, protagonist of Nich Angell's 7STRING, crash lands on the Empyrean in search of his missing sword (the eponymous 7STRING blade). Zach and Afterlife Inc. come into conflict due to the machinations of a being known as Requiem, who is trying to destroy both the Empyrean and Zach's home world of Melodia in the name of art.

While The Heavenly Chord can be considered a standalone story, it remains part of the central canon for both series. Zack and Jack later team up again as part of the Perfect Storm crossover in Extraversal Year 4 by Big Punch Studios.

=== Volume 3: Lifeblood ===
A sinister cult called the Undead seeks to awaken an entity called the Harvest from deep within the Empyrean. The Undead, who model themselves on vampires (a reference to Stephenie Meyer's Twilight series), worship the Harvest as a god, having gained incomplete knowledge of the afterlife's origins from a mysterious benefactor.

Volume 3 centres on manna, the energy source of the dead, and the challenges faced by the afterlife's various rulers in feeding the undead populace. It also marks the first appearance of Rich Fire, Afterlife Inc.'s corporate spy.

=== Volume 4: Man Made God ===
An Afterlife Inc. employee recounts his life to an unidentified hooded man. The man has a gun that causes 'true death' by erasing all memory of a person from existence, and demonstrates its power by destroying the employee. Elsewhere, Afterlife Inc. intervenes when a group of ancient humans attempts to launch a rocket into the void.

In Machonon, Science City, an independent city state, invades the neighbouring Amazonia in an attempt to claim the transformational fountain waters that it controls. In containing the conflict, Afterlife Inc. exposes Science City's leader, the Trinity (a composite of Albert Einstein, Isaac Newton and Nikola Tesla) as a rogue angel, which has been manipulating the scientists for its own ends.

Amid the chaos, a being claiming to be Gabriel, one of the lost archangels, awakens from beneath Amazonia. Gabriel rallies the populace against Afterlife Inc., causing many of Jack's allies to defect to the archangel's side - although Anahel, the only one capable of confirming Gabriel's identity, is nowhere to be found.

Jack faces his accusers in front of the entire afterlife, challenging Gabriel to reclaim his power. Unable to act on his authority, 'Gabriel' is revealed to be a deception orchestrated by the Council of Days, who have mimicked the power of an archangel through a combination of fountain waters and a shield belonging to the lost archangel Michael.

Afterlife Inc. reunites to take down the Council. Jack defeats Monday, the leader of the Council, in a shapeshifting battle of wits, and frees Anahel, who had been incapacitated by the Council in order to conceal their ruse. With the threat neutralised, Afterlife Inc. gathers as the ancients launch their ship into the void, but deep rifts have formed within the group. Unseen, the hooded man watches from the shadows.

=== Volume 5: Glory Days ===
Volume 5 is a series of interconnected vignettes set across different time periods.

Rich Fire is recruited by App for a secret mission to investigate a connection between recent events.

In the distant past, the archangels prepare to face a mysterious force that is approaching the Empyrean. The Metatron, the mightiest of the archangels, can only watch as its siblings are destroyed in the Calamity, due to the strange manner in which it perceives time. Knowing that its future holds only madness, the Metatron accepts its fate, turning at the last moment to address a ghostly version of Elizabeth, who is somehow present in this time period.

In the present day, Anahel recovers from his injuries sustained in Volume 4, but accepts that the manna supply has begun to falter. Elsewhere, Lux travels to the Angel Forge, the source of all angels, to repair her own wounds.

Elizabeth and Jack become trapped within the labyrinth of Zebul and come dangerously close to fading away due to manna deprivation. Elizabeth discovers the Akashic Records, a device that records the lives of everyone who has ever died.

App and Rich Fire interrogate the Trinity - to the dismay of Temperance Jones, who is uncomfortable with their heavy-handed methods. A masked man who resembles Jack attempts to headhunt Temperance to an unknown organisation.

Jack meets Arjun Arcadia, the CEO of rival company White Horse, who appears to be copying Jack's business model, and the two are forced to team up to repel a terrorist attack. In the aftermath, the leader of the terrorists is destroyed by the hooded man and his gun.

Nuriel reveals to Elizabeth how the Metatron, now insane, was imprisoned after the Calamity - but appears to have broken free. A ghostly version of Elizabeth watches her past self via the Akashic Records.

App and Rich Fire's investigation reveals a conspiracy linking recent threats to Afterlife Inc. Before they can act on this knowledge, however, they must thwart an attempt on Jack's life by the hooded man. In saving Jack, App and fellow employee Antimony are caught by the blast, erasing them from history. In the revised timeline, Fire is now Jack's bodyguard - it is unclear how much he remembers.

In the epilogue, Arjun Arcadia and the masked man are revealed to be in the service of Sunday, the missing member of the Council of Days, who has taken control of the Metatron.

== Collected editions ==
Title	Format	ISBN
Volume 1: Dying to Tell	Trade paperback	978-0-95716-670-7
Volume 2: Near Life	Trade paperback	978-0-95716-671-4
The Heavenly Chord	Trade paperback	978-0-95716-678-3
Volume 3: Lifeblood	Trade paperback	978-0-95716-674-5
Volume 4: Man Made God	Trade paperback	978-0-99316-100-1
Volume 5: Glory Days	Trade paperback	978-0-99316-102-5
The Book of Life	Hardcover	978-0-95716-677-6
