= Garage punk (fusion genre) =

Music genre

- Other names: Garage punk rock
- Stylistic origins: Punk rock; garage rock; proto-punk
- Cultural origins: 1980s, United States

Other topics
- Garage rock revival; indie rock; grunge; punk blues; stoner rock

Garage punk is a rock music genre combining the influences of garage rock, punk rock, and often other genres; the genre took shape in the indie rock underground between the late 1980s and early 1990s. Bands drew heavily from 1960s garage rock, stripped-down 1970s punk rock, and Detroit proto-punk; it also often incorporated numerous other styles into their approach, such as power pop, 1960s girl groups, hardcore punk, blues, early R&B and surf rock.

The term "garage punk" often also refers to the original 1960s garage rock movement rather than the 1980s–90s hybrid style. The 1980s–90s style itself is sometimes referred to interchangeably as "garage rock" or "garage revival". The term "garage punk" dates back as early as 1972 in reference to the original 1960s garage rock style, although "punk" as it is known today was not solidified as its own distinct genre until 1976. After the 1980s, groups who were labelled as "garage punk" stood in contrast to the nascent retro garage revival scene, moving past a strictly mid 1960s influence. Associated bands from that period contributed to the development of stoner rock, a more psychedelic variation of the genre.

== Etymology ==
The earliest known use of the term "garage punk" appeared in Lenny Kaye's track-by-track liner notes for the 1972 psychedelic music compilation Nuggets to describe a song by the 1960s garage rock band the Shadows of Knight as "classic garage punk". The term "punk rock" was originally used to describe the music of mid-1960s American garage bands. When referring to 1960s groups, the term "garage punk" is usually deployed interchangeably with "garage rock". MTV's Beverly Bryan says that "garage punk" may be used "more likely" to refer to "garage rock" or "garage revival". While garage bands varied in style, the label of garage punk has been attributed by critic Michael Hann to the "toughest, angriest garage rockers" such as the 13th Floor Elevators and the Sonics.

== Development and characteristics ==
=== 1960s: Original garage bands ===
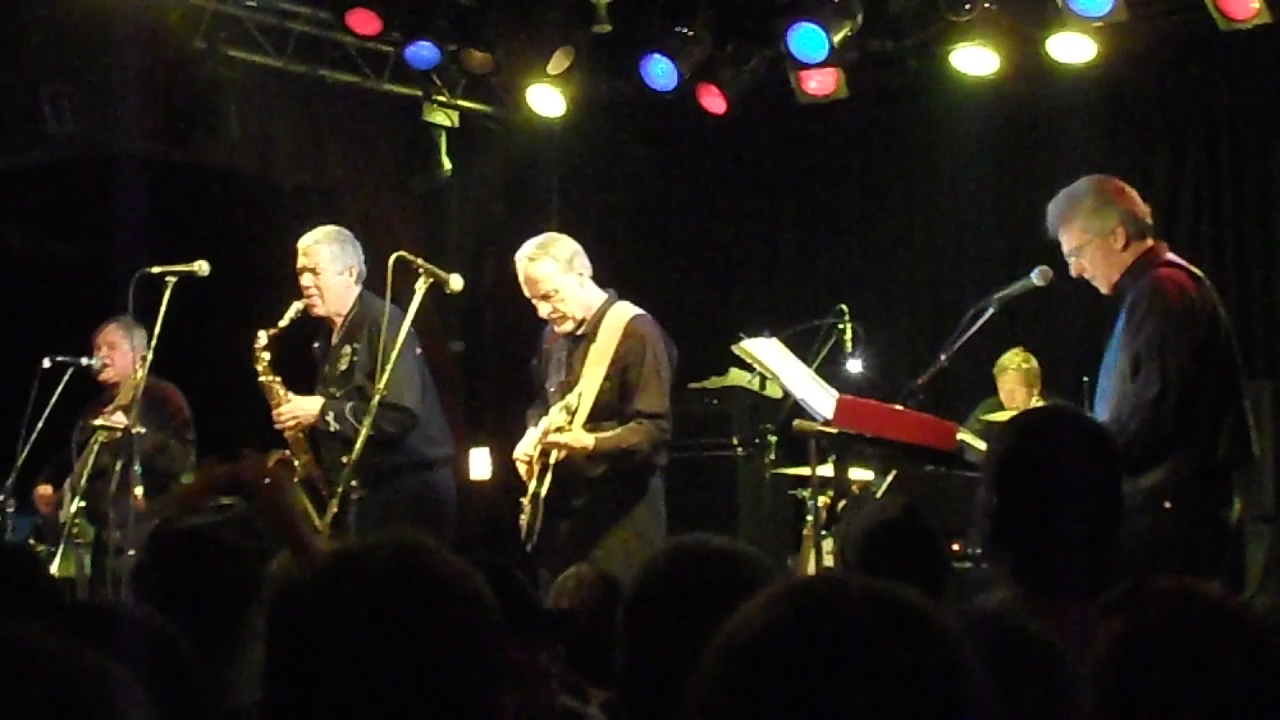
The Sonics are sometimes considered to be the first garage punk band.

Simon Reynolds traces garage punk to American garage rock bands in the 1960s. He explains that mid 1960s garage punk was largely the domain of untrained teenagers who used sonic effects, such as fuzz tones, and relied heavily on riffs. Hann locates the "golden years" of garage punk to 1965–67. The Sonics are credited as a pioneering act in the genre. Critic Tim Sommer wrote: "The Sonics created the template for American garage punk, not to mention crafting the prototype for every punk rock band that thought that three chords and a horny shriek was enough to move a nation."

=== 1980s–2000s: Fusion with 1970s punk ===
In the 1980s, there began a revived interest in the music of the 1960s, starting with garage punk. Labels like Crypt and Norton began reissuing the work of "lost mid-century weirdos", which led a new generation of punk musicians to rediscover older rock artists like Little Richard and the Sonics. In contrast to the retro garage revival scene, bands who continued to draw heavily from stripped-down 1970s punk, rather than just mid-1960s styles, would be widely categorized as "garage punk". (Note: King Khan and the Shrines' Aris Kahn believes that the hybrid is not a revival, but a continuation of rock and roll's traditions, and that garage punk exists even in the 1960s.) According to the AllMusic guide, "Before the punk-pop wing of America's '90s punk revival hit the mainstream, a different breed of revivalist punk had been taking shape in the indie-rock underground. In general, garage punk was not nearly as melodic as punk-pop; instead, garage punk drew its inspiration chiefly from the Detroit protopunk of the Stooges and the MC5.

Allan Rutter writes that the music is often fast-paced and characterized by dirty, choppy guitars and lyrics typically expressing rebelliousness and sometimes "bad taste", and may be performed by "low-fi" acts who are on independent record labels, or who are unsigned. Bands are generally apolitical and tend to distance themselves from hardcore punk and generally avoid strict adherence to the types of social codes and ideologies associated with the punk subculture.

AllMusic adds: "Some of the first garage punk bands who appeared in the late '80s and early '90s (Mudhoney, the Supersuckers) signed with the Sub Pop label, whose early grunge bands shared some of the same influences and aesthetics (in fact, Mudhoney became one of the founders of grunge)." Bands like New Bomb Turks, the Oblivians, the Gories, the Mummies, the Dirtbombs, and the Humpers helped maintain a cult audience for the style through the 1990s and 2000s. Associated bands from that period contributed to the development of stoner rock, a more psychedelic variation of the genre.

== See also ==
- Garage rock
- Proto-punk
- Microgenre
- Garage rock revival

== Bibliography ==
- Aaron, Peter (2013). If You Like the Ramones... Milwaukee, WI: Backbeat Books. ISBN 978-1617134579.
- Austen, Jake (2005). TV-a-Go-Go: Rock on TV from American Bandstand to American Idol. Chicago Review Press. ISBN 978-1-56976-241-7.
- Hoffmann, Frank (2004). Encyclopedia of Recorded Sound. Routledge. ISBN 978-1-135-94950-1.
- Markesich, Mike (2012). TeenBeat Mayhem! Commemorating America's Forgotten Musical Heritage: Those Teenage Rock & Roll Combos of the Swingin' 1960s. Priceless Info Press. ISBN 978-0-9856482-5-1.
- Nobles, Mark A. (2012). Fort Worth's Rock and Roll Roots. Arcadia Publishing. ISBN 978-0-7385-8499-7.
- Reynolds, Simon (1999). Generation Ecstasy: Into the World of Techno and Rave Culture. Routledge. ISBN 0-415-92373-5.
- Reynolds, Simon (2005). Rip It Up and Start Again: Postpunk 1978–1984. London: Faber and Faber. ISBN 978-0-571-21570-6.
- Reynolds, Simon (2012). Energy Flash: A Journey Through Rave Music and Dance Culture. Counterpoint LLC. ISBN 978-1-59376-477-7.
- Sabin, Roger (1999). Punk Rock, So What?: The Cultural Legacy of Punk. Routledge. ISBN 0-415-17029-X.
