= Running Press =

American publishing company

- Parent company: Hachette Book Group
- Founded: 1972; 54 years ago
- Founder: Stuart “Buz” and Larry Teacher
- Country of origin: United States
- Headquarters location: Philadelphia, Pennsylvania, U.S.
- Publication types: Books
- Imprints: Black Dog & Leventhal
- Official website: runningpress.com

Running Press is an American publishing company and member of the Perseus Books Group, a division of the Hachette Book Group. The publisher's offices are located in Philadelphia, Pennsylvania, with many of the corporate functions taking place in Hachette's New York City headquarters. It was co-founded by Stuart "Buz" Teacher and his brother, Lawrence "Larry" Teacher, who died in March 2014.

Black Dog & Leventhal Publishers became an imprint of Running Press in 2017.

== Select bibliography ==
- Running Press Miniature Editions, 2" by 3" hardcover books (many of them are abridgments of bestsellers and often sold as impulse or gift purchases at checkout counters)
- Sneaky Chef cookbook series by Missy Chase Lapine
- Images coloring book series, by Roger Burrows
- Wisdom to Grow On, Charles J. Acquisto (2006)
- The Mammoth Book of Best New Manga, ILYA (2006)
- Cathy's Book, Sean Stewart and Jordan Weisman (2006)
- The Way of the Wiseguy, Joseph D. Pistone (2004)
- The Real Mad Men: The Renegades of Madison Avenue and the Golden Age of Advertising, Andrew Cracknell
- Michael Jackson's complete guide to Single Malt Scotch, Michael Jackson. ISBN 0-7624-0731-X
- Skinny Bitch, Rory Freedman and Kim Barnouin (2005)
- Fabulicious!: Teresa's Italian Family Cookbook, Teresa Giudice (2010)
- Seventeen's Ultimate Style Guide, Ann Shoket and the Editors of Seventeen (2011)
- Dumbemployed, Phil Edwards and Matt Kraft (2011)
- Seven Wonders, Ben Mezrich (2014)

In 2012, Comedy Central contracted to create a publishing imprint with Running Press, including books by Denis Leary and Tosh.0.

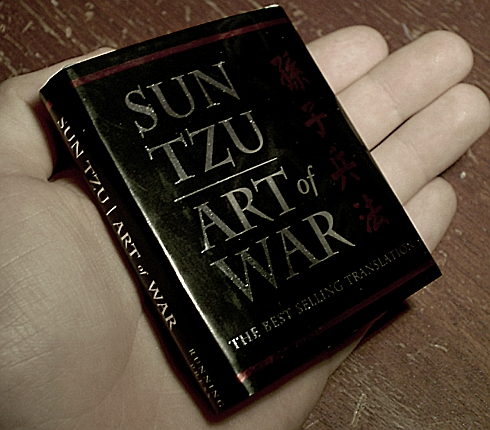
Shown here is a copy of Sun Tzu’s The Art of War.
