= Elon Musk: American Oligarch =

2025 graphic biography by Darryl Cunningham

- Cover of the 2025 Seven Stories Press edition
- Author: Darryl Cunningham
- Language: English
- Subject: Elon Musk; Technology industry Politics of the United States
- Genre: Non-fiction graphic novel
- Publisher: Seven Stories Press
- Publication date: September 9, 2025
- Publication place: United States
- Media type: Print
- Pages: 208
- ISBN: 978-1-64421-522-7

Elon Musk: American Oligarch is a 2025 graphic biography by Darryl Cunningham about businessman Elon Musk. Published by Seven Stories Press on September 9, 2025, the book presents a critical account of Musk's rise from South Africa to the top of the technology industry and his later political influence in the United States.

The book was first published in France in 2024 by Éditions Delcourt under the title Elon Musk: Enquête sur un nouveau maître du monde. The English-language edition was later acquired by Seven Stories Press and updated with a section titled "The Shadow President" dealing with Musk's activities after the 2024 election of Donald Trump.

== Synopsis ==
The book traces Musk's family roots in South Africa and his grandfather's role in the technocracy movement, before following Musk through the creation of PayPal, the rise of Tesla and SpaceX, and his move into right-wing politics in the United States.

The book begins with Musk's youth in apartheid-era South Africa, including his decision to live with his father after his parents separated, and follows his later business career through the early internet economy, Tesla, SpaceX and his takeover of Twitter. Cunningham presents Musk as a figure shaped by scientific ambition, recklessness and poor interpersonal skills, and places special emphasis on his dependence on public subsidies and contracts.

== Reception ==
Kirkus Reviews called the book "a rich account of the world's wealthiest person" and described it as "a powerful cartoon portrait of a cartoonish figure".

Publishers Weekly described it as an "edifying graphic biography" and said Cunningham condenses Musk's life into a clear narrative that presents him as having pursued power "in the guise of innovation".
