= Clubbing =

Clubbing may refer to:

== Medicine ==
- Clubfoot, (also called congenital talipes equinovarus (CTEV)), a congenital deformity involving one foot or both
- Clubbed thumb (known clinically as brachydactyly type D (BDD)), a relatively short and round thumb with an accompanying wide nail bed
- Nail clubbing (also known as drumstick fingers and watch-glass nails), a deformity of the fingers and fingernails

== Music ==
- Clubbing (subculture) (also known as club culture), a custom of visiting and gathering socially at nightclubs
- Mobile Clubbing, a silent party where attendees dance to music listened to on headphones

== Other ==
- Booking (clubbing) (Korean: 부킹), a common practice in South Korean night club scenes of forced socialization between two genders
- Clubbing (comics), a 2007 graphic novel written by Eisner Award published in 2007 by Minx, a cancelled imprint of DC comics
- Seal hunting, attacking seals with a blunt object
- An act of violence in which the primary weapon of attack is a blunt object, causing blunt trauma

== See also ==
- Club (disambiguation)
