= Stephen L. Holland =

Figure in British comic books

Stephen L. Holland is a figure in British comic books. A writer about comics, he is also the co-owner and curator of Page 45, a comic book shop in Nottingham. He is to be distinguished from Steve Holland, also a British historian, bibliographer and writer about comics, associated with the Bear Alley website.

Stephen L. Holland and Mark Simpson opened Page 45 in Nottingham in 1994, soon joined by Dominique Kidd.

Holland wrote the column Talking Shop, about comics retailing, which was published in Comics International. In 2003, he coined the term "real mainstream" to denote comics that eschewed superheroes in favor of subject matter more in line with the popular genres of other media, such as thrillers, romances, and realistic drama. In the 2010s, Holland reviewed comics for Comics Bulletin.

Holland has at various times supported British comic conventions, festivals, and related events. For instance, Page 45 sponsored the British Comic Awards in 2015, with Holland also serving as a judge. He also serves on the board of The Lakes International Comic Art Festival.

In 2020, Holland was named the UK Comics Laureate by The Lakes International Comic Art Festival, a position he held until October 2023.
