= Wisdom to Grow On =

2006 book by Charles Acquisto

- Author: Charles J. Acquisto
- Language: English
- Genre: Non-fiction
- Publisher: Running Press
- Publication date: 2006
- Publication place: United States
- Pages: 176

Wisdom to Grow On is a non-fiction book written by former Baltimore Sun reporter Charles J. Acquisto published by Running Press in 2006. The 176-page book features written advice through letters given to the author's firstborn son Nicholas from 155 famous people. The letters to Nicholas focus on answering how one defines success as well as how a person can achieve success in life.

The book is divided into three parts: Lessons from Leaders, Entertainers Weigh In, and Advice from Athletes. Twenty-four of the letters appear in the book with advice from the other 131 letters sprinkled throughout the three chapters. Letter contributors include Robert Duvall, Phil Mickelson, Richard Branson, Walter Cronkite, Elmore Leonard, Scott Adams, and Gloria Steinem.

A mini-edition of the book was published in 2007.
