= Woodrow Phoenix =

British comics artist and writer

- Areas: Cartoonist, Writer, Penciller, Letterer
- Pseudonym: Trevs Phoenix
- Notable works: Rumble Strip; SugarBuzz! The Sumo Family
- Parent: Sybil Phoenix (mother)

Woodrow Phoenix is a British comics artist, writer, editorial illustrator, graphic designer, font designer and author of children's books.

Phoenix is best known for Rumble Strip, published in 2008, a non-fiction look at the difficult social issues arising from society's dependence on the automobile, which was reviewed in the London Times as "an utterly original work of genius".

Among his other solo creations, are The Sumo Family and The Liberty Cat. The Sumo Family debuted in Escape magazine, and was serialised weekly in the Independent on Sunday newspaper in the UK, then monthly in both Manga Mania magazine, and German/Swiss Instant magazine. The Liberty Cat was published in Japan by Kodansha in Morning magazine.

Phoenix's critical essays on comics have appeared in catalogues for exhibitions at the ICA in London, and at the University of Sussex. Books he has authored include a children's book titled Count Milkula: A Tale of Milk and Monsters! (ISBN 9780954657659); a cultural study Plastic Culture: How Japanese Toys Conquered the World (ISBN 978-4-7700-3017-7), an in-depth look at Japanese toy designs from the post-war era to present times, and their effect on the imaginations and Western markets along with their impact on trends in design and pop culture;

In 2011, Phoenix edited and directed the production of Nelson from an original idea by Rob Davis. Nelson was a groundbreaking "collective graphic novel", with 54 creators producing chapters of a single continuing story, a unique storytelling experiment that won huge critical acclaim. Published by Blank Slate Books, it was The Guardian newspaper's Graphic Novel of The Month, November 2011. The Times newspaper awarded it Best Graphic Novel of 2011, it was nominated for an Eisner Award and was voted Book of The Year in the British Comic Awards 2012.

In 2012, for Blank Slate Books, Phoenix wrote and designed Felt Mistress: Creature Couture (ISBN 978-1-9066533-2-3), a book with similar design and pop-cultural concerns to Plastic Culture, focused on the work of a creative duo from Wales, Louise Evans and Jonathan Edwards.

In spring 2014, Phoenix completed a new graphic novel She Lives, unusual for its surprising size and dramatic presentation: a 96-page handmade, handbound book that is one metre square. The book is hardcover with an austere black surface featuring embossed giant type. Each interior page is composed of images drawn by hand in India ink rather than printed, making the entire book a one-off piece of original comics art. In a further challenge to standard comics production, Phoenix intends not to print this work so that it can only be viewed in person wherever it is exhibited. This unique object was premiered at the British Library's Comics Unmasked exhibition from May to August 2014.

== Biography ==
Phoenix grew up in Brockley, south London, his parents Joe and Sybil Phoenix having migrated to the UK from Guyana in about 1958.

He studied typography at university, and in the 1990s was a letterer for most of the UK's comics publishers, including Escape, Fleetway, Dark Horse UK, Toxic, and Acme Press. He also lettered graphic novels for Gollancz and Methuen.

He self-published several comics during this time as part of the Fast Fiction collective begun by Paul Gravett, before working as a professional artist and writer for UK and US comics companies.

Phoenix's first collaboration was with Glenn Dakin on Sinister Romance, a humour title they jointly wrote, drew, and edited. Four issues were published by Harrier Comics' New Wave imprint. Phoenix has since collaborated as artist and/or writer with Andi Watson, Matt Wagner, Alan Moore, Chris Reynolds, Chris Webster, Eddie Campbell, Rian Hughes, Gordon Rennie, Warren Ellis, Grant Morrison, Paul Grist, Evan Dorkin, Oscar Zarate, José Muñoz, Carl Flint, Ian Carney, Jake Carney, Zach Howard, Annie Caulfield, and Steve May.

With co-writer Ian Carney, Phoenix created an anthology comic called SugarBuzz, published by Slave Labor Graphics, featuring a cast of more than 50 characters. The most popular was Pants Ant, who was featured in an animated cartoon for The Cartoon Network; and the Where's It At, Sugar Kat? series, which was also optioned for film and TV projects by Walt Disney inc.

Phoenix was one of the first Western comics creators to appear in Kodansha's weekly manga anthology Comics Morning magazine in Japan, producing a mystery detective strip called The Liberty Cat. His work has also appeared in numerous anthologies and book collections including Grendel: Black White and Red (with writer Matt Wagner), The Big Book of Death and The Big Book of Weirdos, It's Dark in London edited by Oscar Zarate, The Brighton Book and Alan Moore: Portrait of an Extraordinary Gentleman.

Phoenix shares a studio in London known as Detonator with two comics writer/artists, Ed "ILYA" Hillyer and JAKe.

== Art style ==
Phoenix's work is graphic and playful, while noted for its high degree of formal experimentation. He draws in very different styles, which make his comics appear to be the work of three or four completely different creators. The vividly coloured angular graphics of The Sumo Family are completely unlike the grainy impressionist mood of The Liberty Cat. The elegant line of Sherlock Holmes and The Vanishing Villain is a differing style again that bears no relation to the many SugarBuzz! comics that followed. His book Rumble Strip is his most radical departure from previous directions that even dispenses with characters, leaving only backgrounds.

== Bibliography ==
=== Comics (selected) ===
- The Sumo Family weekly comic strip in The Independent on Sunday, 1990
- The Sumo Family one-page color comic strip in Manga Mania magazine, 1991–93
- The Liberty Cat four episodes for Comics Morning magazine, Kodansha Japan, 1993–94
- Sherlock Holmes in the Curious Case of the Vanishing Villain (Atomeka Press, Tundra Press 1993), with Gordon Rennie, writer
- Lazarus Churchyard No. 2 (Tundra Press 1992), "Goodnight Ladies" pin-ups by D'Israeli, Phil Winslade, Steve Pugh, Woodrow Phoenix, Duncan Fegredo, Garry Marshall and Gary Erskine.
- Sonic the Hedgehog in Sonic the Comic No. 2 and No. 5 (Fleetway Editions, 1993); writer: Mark Millar artist: Woodrow Phoenix
- Ecco the Dolphin in Sonic the Comic #13–18 (Fleetway Editions, 1993); writer & letterer: Woodrow Phoenix (letterer on #13–15 only) Artists: Chris Webster and Steve White
- ToeJam and Earl in Max Overload No. 1, #2 and No. 3 (Dark Horse UK, 1994); writer: Annie Caulfield artist: Woodrow Phoenix
- Eager Beaver (Missive Device) with Ian Carney (Slab-O-Concrete Publications, 1999), ISBN 1-899866-93-0
- Sugar Buzz! with Ian Carney, 9 issues (SLG Publishing, 1998–)
- Sugar Buzz: Live at Budokan! (Slab-O-Concrete, 1999), ISBN 1-899866-33-7
- The Skeleton Key/Sugar Kat special (SLG Publishing, 2000), with Andi Watson, Ian Carney
- The Pants Ant Trouser Hour (SLG Publishing, 2001)
- Kitsune Tales (SLG Publishing, 2003), with Andi Watson, artist
- Where's it at Sugar Kat: The Thin Of the Land (SLG Publishing, 2003), ISBN 0-943151-56-2
- SugarBuzz! Your ticket to happiness (SLG Publishing, 2004), ISBN 1-59362-008-X
- That's a Horse of a Different Colour (The DFC, ongoing weekly, 2008–)
- Donny Digits (The Guardian/The DFC, 2008)
- She Lives (Artists' book, edition of one, 2014)

=== Animation ===
- Pants Ant (2004 pilot for Cartoon Network, unaired)
- Net Worth (2001), The Prudential
- Vicious Mouse (1999), MTV Asia

=== Children's books ===
- Count Milkula (Mogzilla, 2006), ISBN 0-9546576-5-9
- Is That your Dog? (Mammoth, 2001), ISBN 0-7497-4247-X
- Baz the Biz (Mammoth, 1999), ISBN 0-7497-3630-5

=== Other books ===
- Plastic Culture: How Japanese Toys Conquered the World (Kodansha International, 2006), ISBN 978-4-7700-3017-7
- Rumble Strip: If You Want to Get Away with Murder, Buy a Car (Myriad Editions, 2008) ISBN 978-0-9549309-9-8
- Felt Mistress: Creature Couture (Blank Slate Books, 2012), ISBN 978-1-9066533-2-3

=== Anthologies ===
- "You are Here" in It's Dark in London (Serpent's Tail, 1997), ISBN 1-85242-535-0
- "Devil's Witness" in Grendel: Black, White, and Red #4 (Dark Horse, February 1999)
- The Slab-O-Concrete Inactivity Book with Craig Conlan, co-editor (Slab-O-Concrete Publications 2000), ISBN 1-899866-42-6
- "End of the Line" in The Brighton Book (Myriad Editions, 2005), ISBN 0-9549309-0-8
- Nelson as editor/contributor (Blank Slate Books, 2011)

== Notes ==
- Holloway, Lisa (2008), in conversation with Woodrow Phoenix at Castor & Pollux Gallery, Brighton, UK (6 December 2008)
- Stangroom, Howard (2003), "Howard Stangroom interviews Woodrow Phoenix", Comics Forum Magazine, No. 25, pp. 31–43
- Withrow, Steven (2003), Toon Art: The Graphic Art of Digital Cartooning, pp. 146–47 (Watson-Guptill Publications ISBN 0-8230-5378-4)
- Clarke, Theo (1988), "And then nothing happened", The Comics Journal, No. 122, pp. 107–124
