= Skinny Bitch =

Diet book advocating veganism for weight loss

- Author: Rory Freedman and Kim Barnouin
- Illustrator: Margarete Gockel, Maria Taffera Lewis (design)
- Cover artist: Maria Taffera Lewis (design); Margarete Gockel (illustrator)
- Language: English
- Genre: Diet
- Published: December 30, 2005 Running Press Book Publishers
- Publication place: United States

Skinny Bitch is a diet book written by former modelling agent Rory Freedman and former model Kim Barnouin.

The book sold better than expected despite not having high initial sales. Skinny Bitch became a best-seller in the United Kingdom by May 2007 and in the United States by July, more than eighteen months after its initial 2005 press run of 10,000 copies. The book also sold well in Canada.

== Content ==
The book advocates a purely vegan diet and includes sections on factory farming and animal cruelty. In addition to advocating a vegan diet, the authors also say that one should avoid smoking, alcohol, caffeine, chemical additives (such as aspartame) and refined sugar. Sources are frequently cited throughout the book, a large number of which point to vegan websites.

== Reaction ==
Reactions to the book have been mixed. The New York Times reported the lead buyer at retailer Shakespeare & Company saying: "It's definitely the most entertaining diet book I've ever read", and that it "had sold 'extremely well' in the stores." They also quote the co-owner of a bookshop as saying:

It definitely has that sharp, chick-lit look and feel [...] You look at the photo of the authors on the back, and they are both drop-dead gorgeous. If you look at the photos of authors on the crunchy granola books — maybe not so much.

Sistah Vegan author A. Breeze Harper criticized the book, saying that it disregarded race and class issues that make veganism difficult for some women. She also disputed the authors' characterization of women's inability to change their diets as laziness.

== Sequels ==
Several followups have been written, including the cookbooks Skinny Bitch in the Kitch (2007) and Skinny Bitch Ultimate Everyday Cookbook (2010).
