= Peggy Adam =

French comic book artist and illustrator

- Born: Peggy Adam; 1974 (age 51–52) France
- Areas: Artist, writer, cartoonist
- Notable works: Luchadoras

Peggy Adam (born 1974) is a French comic book artist and illustrator. She studied at the Ecole des Beaux-Arts in Saint-Étienne, at the OCAD University in Toronto, and at the ESI (Ecole Supérieure de l'Image) in Angoulême.

She created posters for the Angoulême International Comics Festival, Tulle's theater, and cartoons for French national newspapers and magazines such as Le Monde, Libération, Femme Actuelle, Femina, and Bang. She now lives in Geneva and holds a regular comics section in the daily newspaper Le Courrier.

Her most famous graphic novel, Luchadoras, which was part of the Sélection Officielle of the Angoulême International Comics Festival, was first published by Swiss publisher Atrabile in 2006. It was published by UK-based publisher Blank Slate Books in early 2011. She also published three other books with Atrabile, all part of the Plus ou Moins... series: Plus ou moins... le printemps in 2005, Plus ou moins... l'été in 2006 and Plus ou moins... l'automne in 2007.
