= Minx (comics) =

Imprint of DC comics

- Parent company: DC Comics
- Status: Defunct
- Founded: 2007
- Defunct: 2008; 18 years ago
- Successor: DC Ink
- Country of origin: United States
- Headquarters location: New York City
- Key people: Karen Berger; Shelly Bond
- Publication types: Graphic novel
- Fiction genres: Young adult
- Official website: Official website

Minx was an imprint of DC Comics that published graphic novels aimed at teenage girls. It ran from 2007 to 2008.

== History ==
=== Launch ===
Minx was announced in November 2006, following several years of planning. Senior Vice President Karen Berger and Group Editor Shelly Bond were supervising the imprint.

DC had contracted Alloy Marketing + Media to market the line's books, with a budget of $125,000 to $250,000. Berger said that the success of translated manga and Marjane Satrapi's Persepolis among teenage girls helped motivate the creation of the imprint.

Rachel Kitzmann, a Los Angeles Public librarian, emphasized that the Minx imprint was focused "on real world, plausible situations" and that the "MINX books are an attempt to contract two different formats: the content of YA literature with various types of art. [...] The content of MINX diverged from the traditional aim as American comic books don't typically put the focus on an internal emotional journey, and even manga aimed at girls (shojo) has an extraordinary element. MINX truly focused on the external and internal lives of teenage girls".

Initial online reaction to the imprint had some controversy over the sexual connotations of the name as well as the small proportion of female creators in the lineup, especially due to an emphasis on female creators in The New York Times article that broke the story.

=== Shutdown ===
In September 2008, Comic Book Resources (CBR) reported the confirmation of the imprint's cancellation. Some remaining projects were published, while others were cancelled. CBR summed the situation up:

Multiple sources close to the situation agree Bond and DC aren't to blame for MINX's cancellation, and that this development should be seen as a depressing indication that a market for alternative young adult comics does not exist in the capacity to support an initiative of this kind, if at all.

Of the imprint-closing titles, Emiko Superstar, Token and The PLAIN Janes 2: Janes in Love were published. The sequels to The New York Four and Clubbing were all canceled along with the nearly complete All Nighter. All Nighter's creator David Hahn said: "Over the past two-and-a-half years, I've ignored my other creator-owned projects to devote my efforts to 'All Nighter', so somehow, I will see to it that it eventually gets published".

Most of the explanations for the imprint's downfall focus on the failure of distributor Random House to place the books in the Young Adult section of major bookstores. On the other hand, creators who were questioned said they felt that this could have been achieved if given more time. Kitzmann highlighted that graphic novels have to fight for shelf space in libraries & that the Los Angeles Public Library divides its graphic novel section between American comics and manga. Kitzmann wrote that "this type of shelving is not conductive for the MINX titles to find the appropriate audience. A graphic novel is not picked up because no one know about it, and no one knows about it because it is difficult to find. Since it is difficult to find, people don't care to try, which leads to the format stagnating with only a few key publishers/characters that appeal to a devoted few. It is this cycle of exclusion that makes the ending of MINX a sad but almost inevitable lesson".

Lucia Serantes, in the book Comics through Time: A History of Icons, Idols, and Ideas (2014), wrote that "the reasons for the imprint's cancelation are still unclear and it has received a rather unusual attention from the mainstream press, reflecting the opinions of readers, creators, and critics. Some consider that the female audience in comics was not as large and strong as expected; others criticized the lack of time given to the project to establish a name and audience and the fact that the imprint never made it into general bookstores where their target audience tends to shop".

=== Post-shutdown publications ===
Brian Wood and Ryan Kelly's New York Four had a sequel published under DC's Vertigo imprint, entitled New York Five. It launched in January 2011. In 2014, Dark Horse "acquired several backlist titles by Wood originally published by Vertigo and Minx" as part of a push into the YA market. Dark Horse published "a new combined edition of the two-book series New York Four/Five, created with artist Ryan Kelly, followed by a new edition of DEMO, with art by Becky Cloonan".

Also in 2011, David Hahn's All Nighter was published as a mini-series by Image Comics.

In 2020, The P.L.A.I.N. Janes was reissued by Little, Brown for Young Readers. It also included a third new volume by the original creators Cecil Castellucci and Jim Rugg.

== Legacy ==
Graeme McMillan, for The Hollywood Reporter, wrote: "Minx as a whole was an imprint significantly ahead of its time, with a number of its creators, including [Cecil] Castellucci, Mariko Tamaki, Joëlle Jones and Sophie Campbell, finding mainstream comic industry success in the wake of its closure". Brian Heater, for Publishers Weekly, highlighted that the Minx imprint "targeted at a wholly underserved segment of the comics market: teenage girls. It was a bold and laudable creation, but a concept that was also a bit ahead of its time. Minx closed shop just over a year after launch. But in retrospect, the names on those Minx graphic novels read like a who’s who of comics creators, including such highly regarded artists as Derek Kirk Kim, Mariko Tamaki and Jim Rugg".

In 2017, Abraham Riesman, for Vulture, highlighted that "up until recently, there was a near-total disconnect between kids and comics. Just ten years ago, DC tried to do a young-adult comics line called MINX, but it was shuttered after only a few months" and that the recent shift in audience for graphic novels didn't have to do with either Marvel or DC Comics. Riesman wrote that the "shift was the result of decisions made by librarians, teachers, kids'-book publishers, and people born after the year 2000. Abruptly, the most important sector in the world of sequential art has become graphic novels for young people. [...] According to Milton Griepp of comics-industry analysis site ICv2, aggregated annual comics sales across different kinds of retailers for 2016 revealed that more than half of the top-ten comics franchises were ones aimed at kids. [...] DC is hiring for a new division targeted at young readers, and has already done a bit of a stealth launch by publishing youth-friendly takes on their fabled characters like Supergirl: Being Super and DC Super Hero Girls: Finals Crisis".

Timothy Donohoo, for CBR in 2020, compared the failure of the Minx imprint with the success of the more recent DC Ink imprint which also targets the YA audience. Donohoo wrote: "One of the biggest changes DC has made with DC Ink titles, as opposed to the direction of Minx, is base the current line around familiar DC superhero franchises. [...] The authors behind DC Ink, while typically being first-timers in comics, already have their own fanbases through pre-existing young adult novels. This gives them a built-in brand, while also allowing newcomers to bring their writing styles and world views into comics. The DC Ink books have also been accessible in everyday stores such as Wal-Mart, a benefit which most regular comic books do not have. On the other hand, the Minx titles struggled to be shelved in even dedicated bookstores, as sellers didn't know whether to place them amongst the comics or the YA section. The current superhero and comic book movie boom had also not quite begun when Minx titles were published".

== List of graphic novels ==
Graphic novels released by Minx
Title	Creators	Release date
The P.L.A.I.N. Janes	Cecil Castellucci and Jim Rugg	May 16, 2007
Re-Gifters	Mike Carey, Sonny Liew and Marc Hempel	June 2007
Clubbing	Andi Watson and Josh Howard	July 2007
Good as Lily	Derek Kirk Kim and Jesse Hamm	August 2007
Confessions of a Blabbermouth	Mike Carey, Louise Carey, and Aaron Alexovich	September 2007
Kimmie66	Aaron Alexovich	November 2007
Burnout	Rebecca Donner and Inaki Miranda	June 2008
Water Baby	Sophie Campbell	July 2008
The New York Four	Brian Wood and Ryan Kelly	July 2008
Janes in Love (PLAIN Janes 2)	Cecil Castellucci and Jim Rugg	September 2008
Emiko Superstar	Mariko Tamaki and Steve Rolston	October 14, 2008
Token	Alisa Kwitney and Joëlle Jones	October 2008
