= Maura McHugh (writer) =

US-born Irish horror and fantasy author, in prose, comic books, plays and screenplays

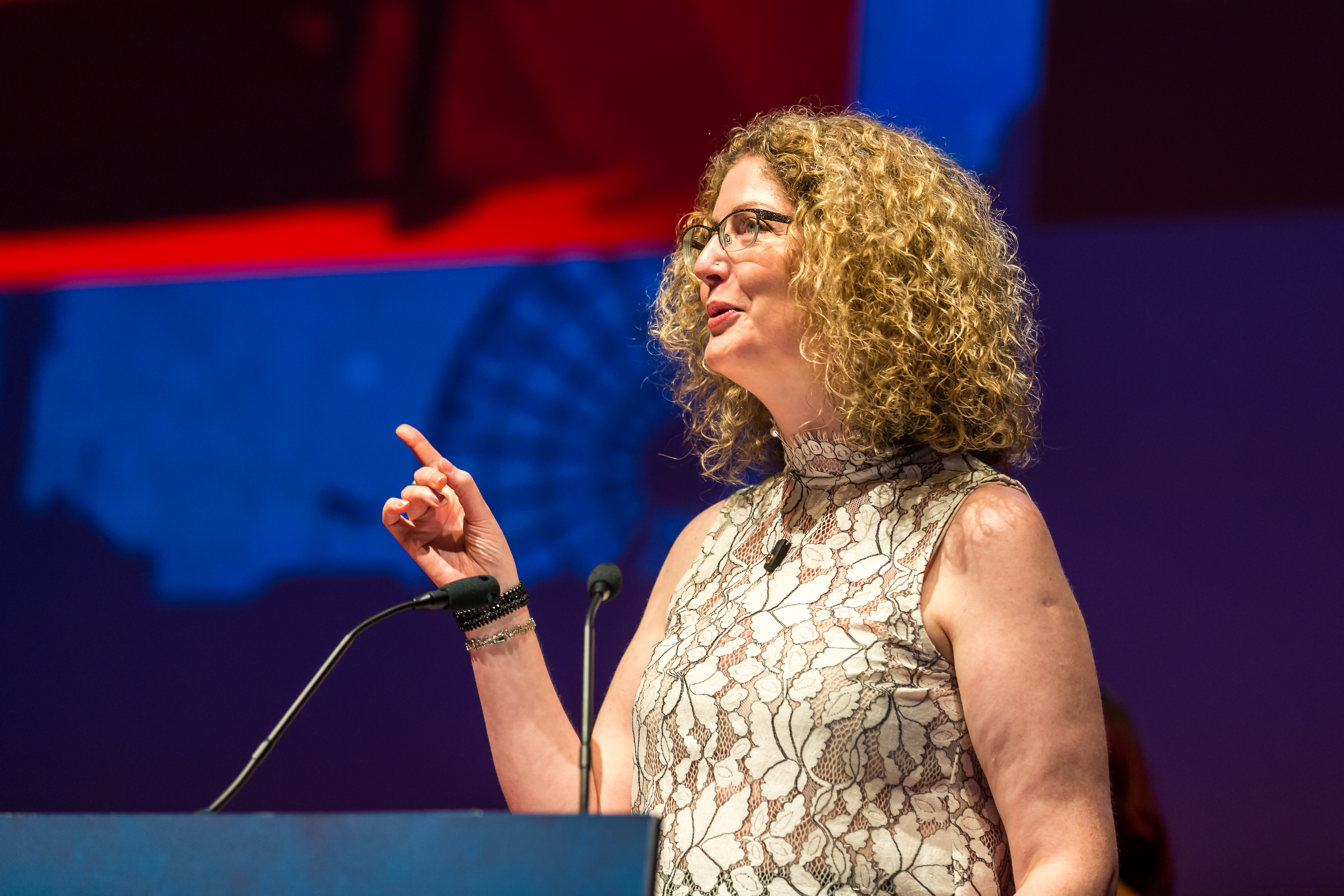
- Maura McHugh 2017.
- Born: United States
- Occupation: Writer
- Writing career
- Genre: Horror fiction
- Website: splinister.com

Maura McHugh is an Irish author of horror and fantasy in prose, comic books, plays, and screenplays.

== Early life ==
Born in the US, McHugh moved to Ireland as a child. She was educated in the National University of Ireland in Galway where she graduated with a B.A. in English and History, and then an M.A. in English. After living overseas for a while McHugh returned to Ireland and to education where she gained a Diploma in Film studies at NUIG, a Foundation Course in Filmmaking at the Galway Film Centre, and finally a second M.A. in Screenwriting at the Huston School of Film and Digital Media.

== Career ==
Based in Galway, McHugh is the author of Róisín Dubh and Jennifer Wilde. She is also editor of the Writers Guild of Ireland fortnightly newsletter, as well as the guild's website and blog.

McHugh has been a regular judge for the Galway Junior Film Fleadh, the British Comic Awards, and Octocon's Golden Blasters, as well as having been a judge for The Shirley Jackson Awards. She also curated "The Image" during the Hay festival in Kells. She was Guest of Honour at the 2015 Octocon (the Irish National Science Fiction Convention).

In 2018, she was invited to take part in an initiative of the Creative Europe project, a 10-day residency in Angoulême in France. Since 2018, she has worked on a number of Judge Anderson stories for Rebellion, including a novella published in 2020.

== Awards ==
=== Won ===
- Recipient of the Gordon R. Dickson Scholarship for the 2006 Clarion West Writers Workshop, 2006.
- Best Irish Writer (comic books) in The Arcade Awards, 2014.
- ICN Award 2015 for ‘Best Irish Writer Published Outside of Ireland’, 2015.
- World Fantasy Award for Short Fiction 2025 for Raptor, published in Heartwood: A Mythago Wood Anthology

=== Nominations ===
- The Arcade Award in the ‘Best Irish Writer’ category, 2015
- The Geekies 2015 – the Geek Ireland Awards – in the Best Irish Writer category, 2015
- Geek Feminist Award in the Women Write About Comics Awesome Awards, 2014
- British Fantasy Award for Best Comic/Graphic Novel for Jennifer Wilde(Atomic Diner Comics), along with Stephen Downey & Karen Mahoney, 2014
- Two ICN Awards, 2014
- Geek Ireland's Best Irish Author of 2014 (comic books), 2014
- Eagle Award for ‘Favourite European Comic Book’ for Jennifer Wilde, 2012
- ICN Award for ‘Best Irish Writer Published Outside of Ireland’, 2013
- The Arcade Award in the ‘Best Irish Writer’ category, 2013

== Bibliography ==
=== Collections ===
- Twisted Fairy Tales, Barron's Educational Series: 1 February 2013. Illustrations by Jane Laurie.
- Twisted Myths, Barron's Educational Series: 1 October 2013. Illustrations by Jane Laurie.
- The Boughs Withered (When I Told Them My Dreams), NewCon Press, August 2019.

=== Comic Books ===
- Lola Vita – Origins, Drawn by Ron Salas, 2016.
- Witchfinder: The Mysteries of Unland, story & script by Kim Newman & Maura McHugh; art by Tyler Crook for Dark Horse Comics, 2014–2015.
- Jennifer Wilde: Tulpa, story & script by Maura McHugh; art by Leeann Hamilton for Atomic Diner Comics. Short Story, 2014.
- Róisín Dubh, story & script by Maura McHugh; art by Stephen Byrne and Stephen Daly, for Atomic Diner Comics, 2011 – 2014.
- Jennifer Wilde: Unlikely Revolutionaries, story & script by Maura McHugh; art by Stephen Downey for Atomic Diner Comics, 2011 – 2013 .
- The Nail, Womanthology comic book anthology, with art by Star St. Germain, edited by Suzannah Rowntree, and published by IDW Publishing,2012
- Colours, Outside An Anthology of new horror fiction, with art by John Riordan, published by Topics Press and Ash Pure, 2017
- Anderson: Psi Division:
  - "SPA Day" (with art by Emma Vieceli, in 2000 AD Summer Sci-Fi Special, June 2018)
  - "The Dead Run" (with art by Patrick Goddard, in Judge Dredd Megazine #410-414, July - November 2019)
  - "No Country for Old PSIs" (with art by Steven Austin, in Judge Dredd Megazine #424, September 2020)
  - "All Will Be Judged" (with art by Anna Morozova, in 2000 AD Summer Sci-Fi Special, July 2021)
  - "Be PSI-ing You" (with art by Lee Carter, in 2000 AD #2250, September 2021)
  - "Dissolution (with art by Lee Carter, in Judge Dredd Megazine #445-447, June - August 2022)
- Judge Dredd:
  - "Apotheosis" (with Michael Carroll, with art by James Newell, in 2000 AD Summer Sci-Fi Special, July 2021)
- "King for a Day" (with art by Andreas Butzbach, in Smash! 2020 Special, published by Rebellion, May 2020)
- "The Thief of Senses" (with art by Robin Henley, in Misty & Scream! 2020 Special, published by Rebellion, October 2020)
- "Teddy Scar" (with art by Steve May, in Monster Fun, published by Rebellion, October 2021)

=== Non-fiction ===
- A Midnight Movie Monograph, Twin Peaks: Fire Walk With Me, published by Electric DreamHouse Press, 2017
- Under the Influence: Kneale’s Dramatic Legacy, We Are The Martians: The Legacy of Nigel Kneale anthology, published by PS Publishing, 2017

=== Novellas ===
- Judges: Psyche, Abaddon Books, 2020.

=== Short stories ===
- Who Hears Our Cries in Forgotten Tongues?, Flash Me Magazine, 2004
- In the Woods, Cabinet des Fées, Vol. 1, No. 1, 2006
- Bone Mother, Fantasy anthology, eds. Sean Wallace & Paul Tremblay, 2007
- Tattoo Destiny, a poem, Jabberwocky 3, ed. Sean Wallace, 2007
- Home, Shroud Magazine, Issues 2, 2008
- Homunculus, Aoife's Kiss, September 2008
- Grave Taster, a poem, in Doorways Magazine #8. It placed second in the magazine's annual poetry competition, 2009
- One pico story on Outshine, 2009
- Exchange, a poem, Goblin Fruit, Spring 2009.
- Vic, Black Static, issue 10. 2009 and the Year's Best Dark Fantasy and Horror 2010, edited by Paula Guran (Prime Books), 2010
- Beautiful Calamity, Paradox Magazine, issue #13, 2009
- The Diet, Arkham Tales, 2009
- The Garden of Death, a top ten finalist in Fantasy Magazine's Micro-Fiction Contest, 2009
- The Tamga, Shroud Magazine, issue 6, 2009
- Empty Mind Came Back With the Pearl, M-Brane SF, issue 9, 2009
- The Secret Names of Buildings, M-Brane SF, issue 12, 2009*‘The Solace of Dark Places, a poem, Goblin Fruit, Spring 2010.
- ‘Involuntary Muscle, Theaker’s Quarterly Fiction, issue 35, 2011
- Water, Black Static, issue 21, 2011
- Mustn’t Grumble, Voices from the Past, 2011*The Hanging Tree, Black Static issue #38, 2014
- Valerie in the anthology La Femme, edited by Ian Whates from NewCon Press and in Obsidian, 2014
- Family in the anthology Cassilda’s Song, edited by Joe S. Pulver from Chaosium Inc, 2015
- A Decade of Horror Stories by Women, edited by Ian Whates from NewCon Press, 2016
- Zel and Grets in the anthology The Grimm Future, edited by Erin Underwood from NESFA Press.
- Moments on the Cliff’ Crannóg.
- Listen Women in Horror Month Anthology, Acid Cane Comics.
- The Light at the Centre, Uncertainties Volume 1, edited by Brian J. Showers for Swan River Press
- The Fruit of the Tree, Ten Tall Tales, edited by Ian Whates for NewCon Press.
- Spooky Girl, Respectable Horror, edited by Kate Laity for Fox Spirit Books.
- A Rebellious House, The Madness of Dr. Caligari, edited by Joe S. Pulver for Fedogan and Bremer.

=== Plays, Films and Podcasts ===
- 29 October – 3 November 2012 ‘The Night-Born Sisters’, performed in the Leicester Square Theatre, London.
- 6 May 2016 The Love of Small Appliances, directed by Justine Nakase.
- Bone Mother, Pseudopod, 2009
- The Tamga, Pseudopod, 2010
- Vic Dark fiction Magazine, 2011
- Hotel Training, directed by Conor McMahon, premiered as part of the Hotel Darklight anthology film, 2009
- Bone Mother is being adapted as a short stop-motion animated film by Sylvie Trouvé and Dale Hayward. Produced for the National Film Board of Canada by Jelena Popovic, 2016
