= British Comic Awards =

Awards for comic books, 2012 to 2016

- British Comic Awards logo
- Awarded for: Achievement in comic books by British creators
- Sponsored by: Page 45 (2015)
- Location: Thought Bubble Festival
- Country: United Kingdom
- First award: 2012
- Final award: 2016

The British Comic Awards (BCA) were a set of British awards for achievement in comic books. Winners were selected by a judging committee; the awards were given out on an annual basis from 2012 to 2016 for comics made by United Kingdom creators published from September of the previous year until September of the current year. Award presentations were held at the Leeds Thought Bubble Festival, in the fall of the year.

The British Comic Award took the place of the National Comics Awards (1997–2003) and the Eagle Awards, both of which had petered out by the early 2010s.

== Overview ==
The British Comic Awards were given out in five categories:

- Best Book — "for long-form comics and collections"
- Best Comic — "for short-form, self-contained stories"
- Young People's Comic Award — "for short and long-form comics suitable for children voted for by young people"
- Emerging Talent — "to recognize irrepressible talent and potential in a young or new creator"
- Hall of Fame — "to commemorate the career and legacy of an influential figure from Britain's rich comic history"

Award recipients — except the Hall of Fame winner — were selected from a list of five nominees in each category. Before the nominees were whittled down to five, the BCA committee would release a longlist of eligible books, comics, and people. Nominations were accepted from the general public via a form on the BCA website.

The BCA committee, which changed slightly each year, was made up of from seven to nine British individuals from academia and the arts. Committee members at various times included Lisa Wood, Maura McHugh, Jamillah Knowles, and Andy Oliver. The BCA committee chose that year's Hall of Fame recipient.

The judging committee changed every year; it generally had five to seven members. Judges at various times included Eddie Argos, Kate Beaton, Hunt Emerson, John Freeman, and Stephen L. Holland of the Nottingham-based comics retailer Page 45.

The Young People's Comic Award was not selected by the BCA judges; it was chosen by children from a selection of British schools and libraries.

== History ==
The Awards were founded in 2012 by Adam Cadwell. There were some complaints after the first set of nominations was announced that the Awards seemed to favor alternative and independent titles rather than "mainstream" British comics like 2000 AD, The Beano, and The Dandy.

For the 2015 awards, the BCA opened a call for nominations from the general public, which could be submitted through its website; at that point, the Awards also partnered with the Nottingham-based comics retailer Page 45. The 2015 awards were managed by BCA Founder Adam Cadwell.

The 2016 awards were co-sponsored by the Thought Bubble Festival and the Leeds Library & Information Service; they were limited to the Young People's Comic Award only. The nominated titles were sent to over a dozen schools across Leeds and throughout the country for young readers to read and judge. Their winning title was revealed at a special ceremony on 4 November in Leeds as part of the 10th anniversary of Thought Bubble; over 100 of the young judges were in attendance.

Following the 2016 awards, it was announced that the British Comic Awards were "on hiatus" and would return, but in the years since they have disappeared.

== Awards ==
Winners listed by year; for some categories, other nominees are listed after the winner.

=== Best Book ===
- 2012: Nelson, edited by Rob Davis and Woodrow Phoenix
  - Don Quixote: Volume 1 by Rob Davis
  - Goliath by Tom Gauld
  - Hilda and the Midnight Giant by Luke Pearson
  - Science Tales by Darryl Cunningham
- 2013: The Nao of Brown by Glyn Dillon
  - The Gigantic Beard That Was Evil by Stephen Collins
  - Judge Dredd: Trifecta by Al Ewing, Rob Williams, Simon Spurrier, Henry Flint, D’Israeli, Carl Critchlow, and Simon Coleby
  - The Man Who Laughs by David Hine and Mark Stafford. Adapted from the novel by Victor Hugo.
  - Mrs. Weber's Omnibus by Posy Simmonds
- 2014: The Encyclopedia of Early Earth by Isabel Greenberg
  - The Absence by Martin Stiff
  - Celeste by I. N. J. Culbard
  - Lighter Than My Shadow by Katie Green
  - Sally Heathcote: Suffragette by Mary Talbot, Kate Charlesworth, and Bryan Talbot
- 2015: The Motherless Oven by Rob Davis
  - Comic Book Slumber Party: Fairytales for Bad Bitches by Hannah Chapman (editor)
  - Supercrash: How to Hijack the Global Economy by Darryl Cunningham
  - The Rabbi by Rachael Smith
  - Tim Ginger by Julian Hanshaw

=== Best Comic ===
- 2012: Bad Machinery: The Case of The Fire Inside by John Allison
  - The Accidental Salad by Joe Decie
  - Girl & Boy by Andrew Tunney
  - Hemlock by Josceline Fenton
  - Tuk Tuk by Will Kirkby
- 2013: Winter's Knight: Day One by Robert M. Ball
  - The Absence #5 by Martin Stiff
  - The Listening Agent by Joe Decie
  - Mud Man #6 by Paul Grist
  - Soppy #2 by Philippa Rice
- 2014:The Wicked + The Divine #1 by Kieron Gillen, Jamie McKelvie, Matt Wilson, and Clayton Cowles
  - Dangeritis: A Fistful of Danger by Robert M. Ball and Warwick Johnson-Cadwell
  - In The Frame by Tom Humberstone
  - Raygun Roads by Owen Michael Johnson, Indio!, Mike Stock, and Andy Bloor
  - Tall Tales & Outrageous Adventures #1: The Snow Queen & Other Stories by Isabel Greenberg
- 2015: Grey Area: From the City to the Sea by Tim Bird
  - Beast Wagon #1 by Owen Michael Johnson, John Pearson, and Colin Bell
  - Hand Me Down by Kristyna Baczynski
  - Lost Property by Andy Poyiadgi
  - Strip by Sarah Gordon

=== Young People's Comic Award ===
- 2012: Hilda and the Midnight Giant by Luke Pearson
  - Bad Machinery: The Case of The Fire Inside by John Allison
  - Dinopopolous by Nick Edwards
  - Gum Girl volume 1: Catastrophe Calling by Andi Watson
  - The Lost Boy by Kate Brown
- 2013: The Complete Rainbow Orchid by Garen Ewing
  - Cindy & Biscuit #3 by Dan White
  - Hilda & The Bird Parade by Luke Pearson
  - Playing Out by Jim Medway
  - The Sleepwalkers by Vivianne Schwarz
- 2014: Hilda and the Black Hound by Luke Pearson
  - Bad Machinery Vol 2: The Case of The Good Boy by John Allison
  - BOO! by Paul Harrison-Davies, Andrew Waugh, Warwick Johnson-Cadwell, Jonathan Edwards, James Howard, Gary Northfield, and Jamie Smart
  - Corpse Talk: Season 1 by Adam Murphy
  - The Beginner's Guide to Being Outside by Gill Hatcher
- 2015: Star Cat: Book 01 by James Turner
  - Cindy and Biscuit Vol 1: We Love Trouble by Dan White
  - Gary's Garden: Book 1 by Gary Northfield
  - Ghost Cat's Pedigree Chums by Craig Conlan
  - Maleficium by EdieOP
- 2016: Lost Tales by Adam Murphy with Lisa Murphy
  - Mega Robo Bros by Neill Cameron with Lisa Murphy
  - Parsley Girl: Carrots by Matthew Swan
  - Tamsin and the Deep by Neill Cameron and Kate Brown
  - Zorse by Ramzee with Liz Greenfield

=== Emerging Talent ===
- 2012: Josceline Fenton
  - Kristyna Baczynski
  - Will Kirkby
  - Louis Roskosch
  - Jack Teagle
- 2013: Will Morris for The Silver Darlings
  - Isabel Greenberg for The River of Lost Souls
  - Dilraj Mann for Frank Ocean VS Chris Brown, Make You Notice, and Turning Point
  - Jade Sarson for Cafe Suada: Cup 3 – Strange Stains
  - Lizzy Stewart for Solo, Four Days In Brussels, Four Days in Iceland, and Object Stories
- 2014: Alison Sampson for her artwork in Genesis (Image Comics) and "Shadows" from the In The Dark anthology (IDW Publishing)
  - Briony May Smith for Tam Lin, The Courting of Fair Spring, and Red-Nosed Frost and The Mermaid
  - Rachael Smith for House Party, One Good Thing, Flimsy, Vicky Park (a weekly comic in the Leicester Mercury), and "The Amazing Seymore" from the Moose Kid Comics anthology
  - Becca Tobin for Eye Contact, "Peppermint Butler's Peppermint Bark" from Adventure Time #30 (Boom! Studios), and numerous short comics
  - Corban Wilkin for Breaker's End
- 2015: Rachael Stott for her artwork in Doctor Who: The Twelfth Doctor – SDCC Exclusive (Titan Comics), Star Trek #46 and #47 (IDW Publishing), and Star Trek/Planet of the Apes #1-5 (IDW).
  - Sarah Graley for Our Super Adventure, Pizza Witch, and Rent Quest
  - Matt Taylor for The Great Salt Lake and his artwork on Wolf #1 and #2 (Image Comics)
  - Adam Vian for Long Lost Lempi and Snippets: Extracts from 4 Comics that Don't Exist
  - Christian Ward for his artwork on ODY-C Volume 1 and ODY-C #6 (Image Comics)

=== Hall of Fame ===
- 2012: Raymond Briggs
- 2013: Leo Baxendale
- 2014: Posy Simmonds
- 2015: Dudley D. Watkins

== See also ==
- Ally Sloper Award
- Eagle Award
- National Comics Awards
- UK Comic Art Award
