= Pants Ant =

Fictional character

Pants Ant is a fictional character created by Woodrow Phoenix and Ian Carney. Pants Ant first appeared in 1998 in the second issue of SugarBuzz! by Carney and Phoenix, and was eventually featured in his own book, a one shot special, The Pants Ant Trouser Hour, published by Slave Labor Graphics. He was also featured in an animated cartoon for The Cartoon Network.

Pants Ant is the main hero of the town of Gaberdine in Pantsylvania, where everything revolves around pants and lower body clothing. He was once a normal ant until he decided to dedicate himself to crimefighting. He wears a mechanical exoskeleton which can change shape and extrude weapons, but it is mostly shaped like a pair of usually human-sized pants. He was once part of a crimefighting team with a dog called Trouser Schnauzer and the Trews Shrews. His main nemesis is the Bearded Swan, who wants to destroy all pants because he cannot find a pair to fit him.

== Pants Ant Appearances ==
- Sugar Buzz! #2 (1998)
- Sugar Buzz! #5 (1998)
- Sugar Buzz: Live at Budokan! (Slab-O-Concrete, 1999) ISBN 1-899866-33-7
- Multivitaminé (La Comedie Illustré, 2000)
- The Pants Ant Trouser Hour (SLG Publishing, 2001)

== Pants Ant Animation ==
Pants Ant (pilot, 2004) for The Cartoon Network, unaired

Script by Ian Carney, storyboarded and directed by Woodrow Phoenix
