= Dumbemployed =

- Website type: Blog
- Available in: English
- Creators: Phil Edwards and Matt Kraft
- Website: http://www.dumbemployed.com
- Launched: April 2009
- Current status: Active

Dumbemployed is an English-language blog and blook featuring stories about "the jobs you love to hate". User-submitted entries are limited to 300 characters in length and begin with "At work today" and end with "I'm dumbemployed". A book containing submissions to the site along with charts, graphs, illustrations, and tips was published in June 2011.

Dumbemployed stories are divided into five categories: Bosses, Customers, Just Dumb, Overtime, Weird Shift.

== History ==
Dumbemployed was launched in April 2009 by Phil Edwards and Matt Kraft. Visitors to the site are encouraged to share stories about hilarious and painful dumbemployment. Anonymous submissions are permitted and users can vote and leave comments on stories.

In October 2011, a Dumbemployed book was announced by Marianne Strong Literary Agency. The book, entitled "Dumbemployed: Hilariously Dumb and Sadly True Stories about Jobs Like Yours", was published by Running Press on June 28, 2011.

A review of the book appeared in the Sunday Book Review section of The New York Times on August 14, 2011.

In June 2012, Edwards announced that Warner Bros. TV has optioned the TV and film rights for Dumbemployed.
