= Luchadoras (comics) =

Graphic novel by Peggy Adam

- Date: 2006
- Publisher: Atrabile

Creative team
- Writers: Peggy Adam
- Artists: Peggy Adam

Original publication
- Date of publication: 2006
- Language: French
- ISBN: 294032929X

Translation
- Publisher: Blank Slate Books
- Date: 2011
- ISBN: 9781906653125
- Translator: Judith Taboy, Martin Steenton

Luchadoras is a French-language graphic novel by Peggy Adam, set during the height of the female homicides in Ciudad Juárez, Mexico. Although the setting of the book is based in fact, the story itself is a work of fiction, which follows a strong-willed victim of domestic abuse attempting to escape her abusive gang-member fiancé.

Released in 2006 to critical acclaim, it appeared in the official selection of the 2007 edition of the Angoulême International Comics Festival. A Spanish edition was published in 2007 by Sins Entido, followed in 2008 by an Italian edition published by 001 Edizioni. An English translation is set to be released by United Kingdom independent publisher Blank Slate Books in February 2011. The English edition is being translated and edited by Judith Taboy and Martin Steenton of Avoid the Future, an independent comic blog based in the UK.
