= The Lakes International Comic Art Festival =

Annual English comics art festival

- Status: Active
- Genre: Comics, Comic art
- Date: mid-October
- Frequency: Annual
- Venue: Venue(s) Old Laundry Theatre, Windermere Jetty Museum
- Locations: Bowness-on-Windermere, Cumbria
- Country: England, United Kingdom
- Inaugurated: 18 October 2013; 13 years ago
- Founder: Julie Tait; Founder partners: The Brewery Arts Centre, Kendal College
- Most recent: 14–16 October 2022
- Next event: October 2023
- Patrons: Charlie Adlard, Yomi Ayeni, Kate Charlesworth, Stephen L. Holland, Sean Phillips, Zoom Rockman, Bryan Talbot and Mary M. Talbot; Festival board: Chris Hogg, Maheen Murtaza, Dinah Rose, Peter Kessler and Gemma Sosnowsky
- Website: https://www.comicartfestival.com/

The Lakes International Comic Art Festival, often referred to as LICAF, is an annual comics art festival. Established in 2013, the not-for-profit festival takes place for a weekend in October each year.

From 2013 until 2021 LICAF took place in Kendal, a market town on the edge of the English Lake District, United Kingdom. In 2022 LICAF moved to multiple venues in Bowness-on-Windermere for the tenth festival, in South Lakeland, Cumbria.

== History ==
The Lakes International Comic Art Festival established the Comics Laureate in 2015. Dave Gibbons, best known for his artwork on Watchmen as well as numerous projects for Marvel, DC Comics and 2000AD, was appointed as the inaugural Comics Laureate in February 2015.

To celebrate the 200th Anniversary of Cumbrian author and illustrator Beatrix Potter in 2016, the festival launched a student competition Beatrix Potter Reimagined. International comic artists, including Luke McGarry, Duncan Fegredo, Hannah Berry and Charlie Adlard, also contributed artworks that interpreted Beatrix Potter’s tales with a modern comic art style.

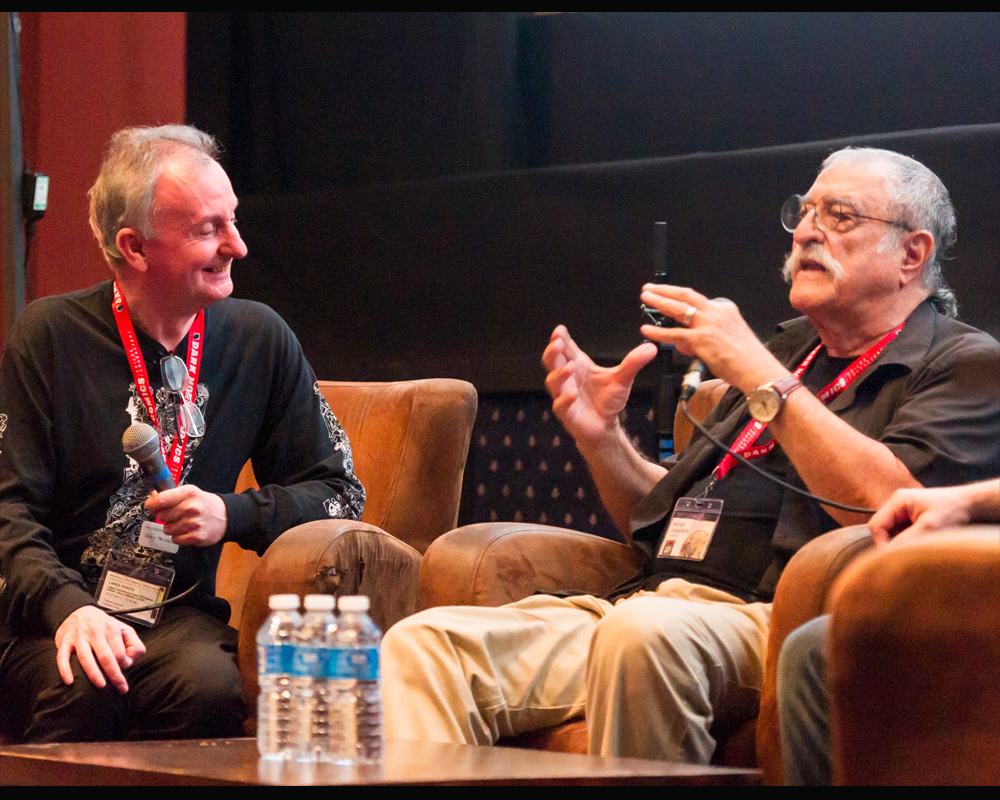
Interview with Sergio Aragonés at the Lakes International Comic Art Festival 2017

At the fifth festival in October 2017, cartoonist Sergio Aragonés launched a new accolade in the comic art industry, the Sergio Aragonés International Award for Excellence in Comic Art. The award was established as a partnership between the National Cartoonists Society and the Lakes International Comic Art Festival. The first award was presented by Aragonés to English artist Dave McKean.

The sixth Lakes International Comic Art Festival in 2018 saw the official launch of Traces of the Great War, an anthology of illustrated short stories featuring over twenty international comic book artists, graphic novelists and writers. The publication was part of 14–18 NOW, the UK’s arts programme commemorating the World War I centenary.

In 2019, in partnership with the Lakes International Comic Art Festival, the National Cartoonists Society hosted the inaugural NCSFest in downtown Huntington Beach, California, United States, from 17 to 19 May.

== Honors and awards ==
=== Comics Laureates ===
As described in the comics internet news site Bleeding Cool, the job of the UK Comics Leaurate is to play... "an ambassadorial and educational role for the comic genre and aims to raise awareness of the impact comics can have in terms of increasing literacy and creativity. The appointment is made biennially to a distinguished comics creator, writer or artist in recognition of their outstanding achievement in the genre."

- 2015 Dave Gibbons
- 2016 Charlie Adlard
- 2017 Hannah Berry
- 2021–2023 Stephen L. Holland, co-owner and curator of Page 45, a comic book shop in Nottingham
- 2024–2025 Bobby Joseph

=== The Sergio Aragonés International Award for Excellence in Comic Art ===
- 2017 Dave McKean
- 2018 Hunt Emerson
- 2019 Charlie Adlard (presented at the Reubens Awards at the inaugural NCSFest in Huntington Beach, California)
- 2021 Boulet
- 2022 Posy Simmonds
- 2023 Viz
- 2024 Juanjo Guarnido
- 2025 Lorenzo Mattotti

=== LICAF Special Award ===
In 2025, LICAF provided a special award to Palestinian cartoonist Safaa Odah for Safaa and the Tent, which collected comics made by Odah from October 2023 to December 2024 while being displaced by the Gaza war.

== See also ==
- Comica — London International Comics Festival (2003–2013)
