= The Mammoth Book of Best New Manga =

2006 book by ILYA

- Author: ILYA
- Language: English
- Subject: manga
- Genre: Encyclopaedia
- Publisher: (United States) Carroll & Graf Publishers (defunct), Running Press (current) (United Kingdom) Constable & Robinson
- Publication date: 3 December 2006
- Media type: Print (Paperback)
- Pages: 512 pp (first edition)
- ISBN: 978-0-7867-1838-2

The Mammoth Book of Best New Manga is edited by ILYA. The book contains works by a variety of artists. The first book was released in North America by Running Press on 3 December 2006. It was licensed by Carroll & Graf Publishers before it was phased out by parent company, Perseus Books Group. The second book was released in the United Kingdom by Constable & Robinson on 25 October 2005. The third book was released in the United Kingdom by Constable & Robinson on 6 November 2008 and in North America by Running Press on 1 December 2008.

== Reception ==
Manga Life's Kelvin Green comments that the "eclectic nature of the book is one of its strengths". ComicMix's Andrew Wheeler comments on the Mammoth Book of Best New Manga series about how most of the work are "nearly all British and that none of them are, oh, Japanese" despite having manga in its title. Paul Gravett comments on the diversity of the works in the second book that are "compiled from as far afield as Sweden and Thailand." Dan Murphy from The Buffalo News commends the third book for doing "what it sets out to do and serves up a sampler platter of a variety of styles and forms."
