= Rob Davis (comics) =

British comics artist, writer, and editorial illustrator

Rob Davis is a British comics artist, writer, and editorial illustrator located in Blandford Forum, Dorset. He has contributed to Roy of the Rovers, Judge Dredd, Doctor Who Magazine and Doctor Who Adventures. He has also created the graphic novels Don Quixote (based on Cervantes' novel of the same name) and a trilogy of original graphic novels, beginning with The Motherless Oven.

== Profile ==
In the late 1970s, Davis contributed comic strips to the fanzine BEM. Davis' next strips were seen in the self-published Slang comic, which he published with Sean Longcroft in the period 1989–1992.

Davis' first professional work was on the association football comic magazine Roy of the Rovers, when it was relaunched by Fleetway Publications as a monthly title in 1993. (The original title had concluded in March 1993 with Roy Race having crashed his private helicopter; readers were left not knowing if he was alive or dead.) In September 1993, Roy awoke from a coma to find his famous left foot amputated after the crash. The new Roy was 'Delroy' of the Rovers, Paul "Delroy" Ntende, a ragamuffin who played for Nigeria. The new approach by Davis and editor Stuart Green was committed to the Kick Racism Out of Football Campaign. Davis also designed posters for the campaign featuring Delroy and Rocky. The strip itself dealt with issues of racism in the game, among other subjects. Green and Davis introduced many other innovations. Among these, he split the history of Roy Race into three generations of Race: grandfather, father, and son. In addition to the monthly stories in Roy of the Rovers, Davis drew another Roy strip in Shoot magazine as a two-page spread every week. Many of the changes made during Green and Davis' tenure on the strip were dropped in later revamps of the magazine.

Davis went to work for 2000 AD, drawing Judge Dredd Lawman of the Future, a child-friendly Judge Dredd spin-off based on the 1995 film.

Davis then became disenchanted with comics, pursuing a career as an illustrator, before returning as a comics writer on "Bus Stop", "The Woman Who Sold the World" and "The Widow's Curse", published in Doctor Who Magazine. He worked on a number of other stories for Doctor Who Magazine solely as an artist, rather than a writer.

Davis submitted a four-page comic strip to a 2010 graphic short story competition sponsored by The Observer. Although the submission, entitled "How I Built My Father," failed to win, it generated interest and Davis returned to comics with another short strip for the anthology Solipsistic Pop.

In 2011, Davis conceived of the idea of a collaborative graphic novel that would showcase the talent of the UK comics scene, made up of chapters by many creators. The result was Nelson, co-edited with Woodrow Phoenix. Phoenix and Davis guided a team of 54 creators to produce 54 chapters of a single story about a woman named Nell. As a storytelling experiment, it won huge critical acclaim. The Guardian newspaper awarded it its Graphic Novel of The Month for November 2011. The Times newspaper awarded it Best Graphic Novel of 2011, it was nominated for an Eisner Award and was voted Book of The Year in the British Comic Awards 2012.

Davis then began work on a graphic novel adaptation of Don Quixote, which he made in two parts. The first volume was published in 2011 by SelfMadeHero and was featured in many best-of-the-year lists. Davis released the second volume in 2013. The Complete Don Quixote (ISBN 978-1906838317) contains both parts. The collection was nominated for two Eisner Awards in 2014.

The Motherless Oven, a surreal coming-of-age story based on "How I Built My Father", was published by SelfMadeHero in 2014. It won the British Comic Award for best book and was nominated for the Best Graphic Album – New Eisner Award. A sequel, entitled The Can Opener's Daughter, was published in December 2016, while a third volume, The Book of Forks, was published in October 2018.

== Comics Bibliography ==
=== Self-published ===
- SLANG Comic (with Sean Longcroft, self-published, three issues 1989–92)

=== Short comics and serials ===
- Roy of The Rovers Monthly (art, script co-written with Stuart Green) (Fleetway Editions 19 issues, 1993–95)
- "Roy of The Rovers" (art only, scripts by Stuart Green) (Shoot Magazine weekly, IPC 1994–95)
- Judge Dredd: Lawman of the Future Fleetway 1995–96) (contributing artist)
- "The Woman Who Sold the World" (script only, art by Mike Collins, Doctor Who Magazine, Panini Comics, #381–384, 2007) (collected in Doctor Who: The Widow's Curse graphic collection, 2009)
- "Bus Stop!" (script only, art by John Ross, Doctor Who Magazine #385, 2007) (collected in Doctor Who: The Widow's Curse graphic collection, 2009)
- "The Widow's Curse" (script only, Doctor Who Magazine #395-398, 2008) (collected in The Widow's Curse graphic collection, 2009)
- "The Time of My life" (art only, script by Jonathan Morris, Doctor Who Magazine #399, 2008) (collected in Doctor Who: The Widow's Curse graphic collection, 2009)
- "The Deep Hereafter" (art only, script by Dan McDaid, Doctor Who Magazine #412, 2008) (collected in Doctor Who: The Crimson Hand graphic collection, 2012)
- "The Immortal Emperor" (art only, script by Jonathan Morris, Doctor Who Storybook, 2009, Panini UK) (collected in Doctor Who: The Widow's Curse graphic collection, 20009)
- "The Professor, the Queen and the Bookshop" (art only, script by Jonathan Morris, Doctor Who Magazine #429, 2010)
- "The Dunwich Horror" (script only, art by INJ Culbarb, adapted from the novelette by H. P. Lovecraft, The Lovecraft Anthology, SelfMade Hero 2011)
- "The Torturer's Garden" (Solipsistic Pop #3)
- "My Family and Other Gypsies" (Respect – International Comics)

=== Graphic novels ===
==== Don Quixote adaptation ====
- Don Quixote (Volume 1)(SelfMadeHero, 2011) ISBN 978-1906838317
- Don Quixote (Volume 2) (SelfMadeHero, 2013) ISBN 978-1906838614
- The Complete Don Quixote(Harry N. Abrams, 2013) ISBN 978-1906838652

==== The Motherless Oven trilogy ====
- The Motherless Oven (SelfMadeHero, 2014) ISBN 978-1906838812
- The Can Opener's Daughter (SelfMadeHero, 2016) ISBN 978-1910593172
- The Book of Forks (SelfMadeHero, 2018) ISBN 9781910593738

===== Other works =====
- Nelson (conceived of, contributed to and, with Woodrow Phoenix, edited, collaborative graphic novel) (Blank Slate Books, 2011) ISBN 978-1906653231
