= Clubbing (comics) =

Graphic novel

- Date: 2007
- Page count: 176 pages
- Publisher: Minx

Creative team
- Writers: Andi Watson
- Artists: Josh Howard
- ISBN: 1401203701

Clubbing is a graphic novel published in 2007 by Minx, a cancelled imprint of DC Comics. It was written by Eisner Award nominated Andi Watson and drawn by Josh Howard.

== Plot ==
Teenage clubber Charlotte Lottie is sentenced to spend summer on her grandparents' rural country club after an incident involving a fake ID. While working and helping in the club, she discovers a body. After getting involved with a local youth, the two discover that Lottie's grandmother was attempting to summon a demon. After thwarting her grandmother and the local ladies' plans, Lottie is sent to Asia to finish her sentence.

== Sequel ==
A proposed sequel, Clubbing 2: Clubbing in Asia, was written, and art started by Howard, but the imprint folded before it was published or completed.
