= Sybil Phoenix =

British community worker (born 1927)

The Reverend Sybil Theodora Phoenix (née Marshall; born 21 June 1927) is a British community worker of Guyanese birth. She was the first black woman to be awarded the MBE, in 1973.

== Biography ==
Sybil Theodora Marshall was born in Georgetown in British Guiana (now Guyana), where she grew up. When she was nine years old her mother died, after which Sybil lived with her grandfather until his death when she was 12, and then with an aunt and uncle. After leaving school she became secretary to the minister of the church as well as helping in the church youth club, where she met her future husband in her early twenties. She was also a classically-trained singer. She and her fiancé Joe Phoenix moved to England in 1956, and married in June of that year. They experienced racism in London.

Sybil Phoenix started fostering for Lewisham in 1961. She also became a community worker, providing support for unwanted children. In recognition of her work in Lewisham she was awarded the MBE in 1972. In partnership with the London Borough of Lewisham she began a supported housing project for single homeless young women aged from 16 to 21, and in 1979, the project was named the Marsha Phoenix Memorial Trust, in memory of her own daughter, who died in a car accident in 1974.

In 1971 she founded a youth club for black teenagers in New Cross, on Pagnell Street and named it Pagnell Street Centre (later changed to Moonshot) The club operated out of an old mission hall in Pagnell Street and it became a community centre for local black people, with academic classes, a lending library, dances, a football team, daytime drop-in classes and support for young mothers and social evenings for the elderly. However, the center was destroyed one night in an arson attack by members of the right-wing extremist National Front. Sybil Phoenix vowed to rebuild it: "My name is Phoenix and I will build a new center from the ashes of this club, so help me God". Four years later, in 1981, the Prince of Wales was present for the grand opening of Moonshot, the new Pagnell Street Centre, the first purpose-built community centre for black people in the UK.

Sybil Phoenix was involved in community support and activism following the New Cross house fire of 1981. The Moonshot Club was the venue for the first meeting after the fire. In 1999 she contacted MP Joan Ruddock to discuss a memorial to those killed in the fire; Ruddock has described Sybil Phoenix as "one of Deptford's remarkable black community leaders".

She has contributed to research about Stop and Search. She has also been involved in welcoming Lewisham people who have become British citizens, after their citizenship ceremony.

Sybil Phoenix's life has been used in Black History Month.

Sybil Phoenix was a Methodist local preacher for many years, working closely with the British Council of Churches to forge links between peoples of all faiths. While based at Clubland Methodist Mission on Walworth Road in South London, Sybil Phoenix was instrumental in setting up anti-racist training for members of the clergy, known as the Methodist Leadership Racism Awareness Workshop (MELRAW) and as Director she took this work to many countries around the world.

She occasionally acted as a Minister without portfolio for Guyana, and for this was awarded the Medal of Service by Guyana in 1987. Sybil Phoenix also worked for the Community Liaison Scheme, and as Vice-Chair of Lewisham Council for Community Relations. In 1993 she was awarded an Honorary Fellowship by Goldsmiths, University of London for her services to the local community.

In 1996, Sybil Phoenix was made an Honorary Freeman of the Borough of Lewisham, and in 1998 was awarded the Freedom of the City of London. From 1998 to 1999, she was Civic Mayoress of Lewisham. She was elevated to OBE in June 2008.
