= Roger Sabin =

English writer

Roger Sabin (born 1961) is an English writer who writes about comics and lecturer at Central St. Martins.

== Work ==
Sabin is best known for his book Adult Comics which has gone through a number of editions, remaining in print for 20 years and is the standard academic work on the history of the comic book form, and Comics, Comix & Graphic Novels: A History of Comic Art a cultural history of comics for both popular and scholarly audiences. He has also written newspaper articles on the topic of comics, film and punk culture.

== Bibliography ==
=== Books ===
- Adult Comics: An Introduction (Taylor & Francis, 1993, ISBN 0-415-04419-7, Routledge, 2005, ISBN 0-415-29139-9)
- Comics, Comix and Graphic Novels: A History of Comic Art (Phaidon, 1996, ISBN 0-7148-3008-9)
- The Lasting of the Mohicans: History of an American Myth (University Press of Mississippi, 1996, ISBN 0878058591)
- The Movie Book: An A-Z guide to 500 landmark individuals working in film (Phaidon, 1999, ISBN 0-7148-3847-0)
- Punk Rock: So What?: The Cultural Legacy of Punk (Routledge, 1999, ISBN 0-415-17030-3)
- Below Critical Radar: Fanzines and Alternative Comics from 1976 to the Present Day (Slab-O-Concrete, 2000, ISBN 1-899866-47-7)
- Cop Shows: A Critical History of Police Dramas on Television (McFarland & Co Inc, 2015, ISBN 0-7864-4819-9)

=== Papers ===
- "Crisis in Modern American and British Comics, and the Possibilities of the Internet as a Solution", in Anne Magnussen & Hans-Christian Christiansen (Eds.), Comics & Culture: Analytical and Theoretical Approaches to Comics, pp. 43–58. Museum Tusculanum Press, 2000. ISBN 87-7289-580-2.
- "Ally Sloper: The First Comics Superstar?", Image & Narrative #7, October 2003
- "Comics", in Daniele Albertazzi & Paul Cobley (Eds.), The Media: An Introduction (3rd ed.), pp. 77–87. Harlow: Longman, 2010. ISBN 978-1-4058-4036-1.
