= ILYA =

British comics writer and artist

- Born: Ed Hillyer
- Areas: Writer, artist
- Pseudonym: ILYA
- Notable works: Bic

Ed Hillyer, better known as ILYA, is a British comics creator.

His work has appeared in publications from all the major US and UK comics companies, from Fleetway Editions' Crisis, Dark Horse's Manga Mania, Deadline magazine to work for DC Comics' Vertigo imprint. Since 2000, his works have appeared from a wide variety of international book publishers and cultural institutions, including Little Brown, Robinson, SelfMadeHero, Myriad Editions, The Royal Academy of Arts, The British Council, Lonely Planet Guides, The Independent on Sunday, The Times & Guardian newspapers, and many more.

== Biography ==
He is perhaps best known for his character Bic who appeared in a self-published series of comics (collected as Skidmarks from Tundra UK, 1993, and Active Images, 2003) and then as part of the larger cast of The End of The Century Club, his award-winning series of original graphic novels (Best Graphic Novel, United Kingdom Comic Art Convention - 1997).

ILYA collaborated with Eddie Campbell on his "Deadface"/Bacchus series (Vol II: The Gods of Business), and co-created spin-off title/series The Eyeball Kid.

Between 2006-2008 he edited three volumes of The Mammoth Book of Best New Manga, an anthology presenting the work of an international roster of contributors whose comics show the influence or inspiration of Japanese manga and anime, including: Michiru Morikawa, winner of the International Manga and Anime Festival's grand prize in 2005, previous category winners Asia Alfasi and Joanna Zhou, as well as established UK cartoonists Andi Watson and Craig Conlan. He has been on the judges panel of the UK Japanese Embassy's annual 'Manga Jiman' (<Having pride in manga>) talent competition since 2007.

Ten episodes of his animated online comic strip Jean Genii (originally commissioned by the BBC) are viewable online.

Ed Hillyer's first prose novel, The Clay Dreaming, was published in March 2010 by Myriad Editions.

In 2014, he completed a new graphic novel, Room For Love, about a relationship between a middle-aged romance novelist and a teenage runaway. It was published by SelfMadeHero.

He is currently resident 'Cartoon Historian', regularly appearing in alternate issues of The New Internationalist magazine - 19 episodes published as of January 2024.

== Bibliography ==
- Skidmarks (Tundra UK, 1992)
- The End of the Century Club: Countdown (Slab-O-Concrete, 1999, ISBN 978-0952738602)
  - French language edition: "Le club de la fin du siècle" (Bethy, 2000, ISBN 978-2912320186)
  - Italian language edition: "Prossima Uscita" (Alta Fedelta, 2000)
- Love S.T.I.ngs: A Beginner's Guide to Sexually Transmitted Infections (Family Planning Association, ISBN 978-1905506149)
- Time Warp: The End of the Century Club (Slab-O-Concrete, 1999, ISBN 978-1899866205)
- Skidmarks (Active Images, 2004, ISBN 978-0974056746)
- Manga Drawing Kit (Thunder Bay Press, 2004, ISBN 978-1592235117)
  - French language edition: Manga Art (Solar, 2005, ISBN 978-2263041594)
  - German language edition: Manga Zeichnen (Fleurus, 2007, ISBN 978-3897174283)
  - Spanish language edition: Manga Kit De Dibujo (H Blume, 2008, ISBN 978-8489840980)
- Ballast (with writer Joe Kelly, Active Images, 2005, ISBN 0-9766761-2-5)
- The Mammoth Book of Best New Manga Vol.1 (Carroll & Graf, 2006, ISBN 0-7867-1838-2)
  - Spanish language edition: "El Gran Libro Del MANGA", (Malsinet/Robinbook 2006, ISBN 978-8496708136)
- The Mammoth Book of Best New Manga Vol.2 (Constable & Robinson, 2007, ISBN 978-1-84529-642-1)
- The Mammoth Book of Best New Manga Vol.3 (Robinson Publishing, 2008, ISBN 978-1-84529-827-2)
- Manga Shakespeare: King Lear (SelfMadeHero, 2009, ISBN 978-0955816970)
- The Clay Dreaming (Myriad Editions, 2010, ISBN 978-0-9562515-0-3)
- It's Dark in London (SelfMadeHero re-issue, 2012, ISBN 978-1906838447)
- Room for Love (SelfMadeHero, 2013, ISBN 978-1906838720)
- The Mammoth Book of Cult Comics (Running Press, 2014, ISBN 978-1472111494)
- The Mammoth Book of Skulls (Running Press, 2014, ISBN 978-0762454631)
- Colour Me Bad (Little Brown, 2015, ISBN 978-1472137203)
- How to Draw Comics (Lom Art, 2016, ISBN 978-1910552292)
- Kid Savage in collaboration with Joe Kelly (Image, 2017 ISBN 978-1632159380
- How To Draw Absolutely Anything Activity Book (Robinson, 2018 ISBN 978-1472140722
- Time Traveller (co-written and illustrated in collaboration with Prof Ian Christie)
- A Poetic City (a biography of Chatterton, in collaboration with illustrator Willem Hampson)
