= Craig Conlan =

Scottish writer and cartoonist

Craig Conlan is a Scottish comics writer/artist. He is best known for his character Hairy Mary, who has appeared in two graphic novel collections and several minicomics, all through Brighton publisher Slab-O-Concrete from 1998 to 2002. Conlan has also created the cartoon Ghost Cat's Pedigree Chums which was nominated for Best Young People's Comic Award at the British Comic Awards 2015. He has created a number of other comic strip creations. He has also worked as an editorial illustrator for UK women's magazines.

He has written and drawn a strip for The Mammoth Book of Best New Manga, an anthology of new work by young British artist/writers edited by Ed 'Ilya' Hillyer.

== Bibliography ==
- The Da Finchi Code (Krow Twins) Illustrator (Mogzilla, 2011) ISBN 978-1906132026
- Santa Claus is on a Diet Illustrator (Mogzilla, 2007) ISBN 0954657691
- The Slab-O-Concrete Inactivity Book with Woodrow Phoenix, co-Editor (Slab-O-Concrete Publications 2002) ISBN 1-899866-42-6
- Hairy Mary in FUN FUR (Slab-O-Concrete, 1999) ISBN 1-899866-22-1
- Bad Hair Day (Missive Device) (Slab-O-Concrete Publications, 1999) ISBN 1-899866-98-1
- Hairy Mary in GRRRL! (Missive Device) (Slab-O-Concrete Publications, 1998) ISBN 1-899866-96-5
- Hairy Mary (Slab-O-Concrete, 1998) ISBN 1-899866-12-4
