= Darryl Cunningham =

British author and cartoonist

- Born: 1960 (age 65–66) UK
- Area: Cartoonist
- Notable works: Science Tales; Psychiatric Tales; The Age of Selfishness; Billionaires: The Lives of the Rich and Powerful

Darryl Cunningham (born 1960) is a British author and cartoonist who has written the books Science Tales (also known, in the US, as How to Fake a Moon Landing), Psychiatric Tales, The Age of Selfishness and Billionaires: The Lives of the Rich and Powerful.

== Biography ==
Cunningham graduated from Leeds College of Art in Leeds, West Yorkshire. He has stated that his influences include Gustav Klimt, Egon Schiele, and George Grosz. The book Psychiatric Tales was partly inspired by Cunningham's years spent working as a health care assistant on an acute psychiatric ward in his native England, as well as his own experience with acute depression.

== Career ==
Cunningham's books include Psychiatric Tales (2010, Blank Slate Books) and Science Tales (2013, Myriad Editions). The foreword for the American edition of Science Tales, entitled How to Fake a Moon Landing: Exploring the Myths of Science Denial, was written by Andrew Revkin.

Psychiatric Tales received a positive review in The Observer from Rachel Cooke, who wrote that it was "an unsettling but rewarding experience." Cian O'Luanaigh also reviewed the book favourably, writing that it provides "an enlightening look at mental illness."

Science Tales also received critical acclaim, for instance from New Scientist, who wrote that Cunningham's "charming artwork complements his concise arguments". The book was also called "fantastic" by Cory Doctorow, who wrote that Cunningham "has a real gift for making complex subjects simple."

Billionaires describes the lives and influence of Jeff Bezos, Rupert Murdoch, and the Koch brothers.

In May 2024 his graphic novel on Elon Musk, titled Elon Musk: Investigation into a New Master of the World, was published in France to good reviews. However it struggled to find an English-language publisher, which Cunningham attributed to a "climate of fear" from "legal consequences".

In addition to his books, Cunningham is well known for his comic strips, which have appeared on the website of Forbidden Planet, and have also been featured in the Act-i-vate collective. Additionally, his biography of Ayn Rand has been featured on io9, and his strip about global warming, posted on his blog in December 2010, has been featured on Phil Plait's blog Bad Astronomy, with Plait saying that Cunningham is "careful to present the facts, and to be balanced where called for." He has also created several webcomic strips, including Super-Sam and John-of-the-Night and The Streets of San Diablo.

== Bibliography ==
- — (27 October 2010). Supercrash: How to Hijack the Global Economy. Myriad Editions. ISBN 978-1908434432.
- — (2010). Psychiatric Tales. Blank Slate Books. ISBN 9781906653088.
  - republished in the U.S. as Psychiatric Tales: Eleven Graphic Stories About Mental Illness. Bloomsbury USA. 1 February 2011. ISBN 978-1608192786.
- — (2012). Science Tales. Myriad Editions. ISBN 978-1-908434-36-4.
  - republished in the U.S. as How to Fake a Moon Landing: Exposing the Myths of Science Denial. Abrams ComicArts. 2 April 2013. ISBN 978-1419706899.
- — (November 2013). Uncle Bob Adventures. Vol. 1. Blank Slate Books.
- — (June 2014). Uncle Bob Adventures. Vol. 2. Blank Slate Books. ISBN 978-1906653316.
- — (31 March 2015). The Age of Selfishness: Ayn Rand, Morality, and the Financial Crisis. Abrams Books. ISBN 978-1419715983.
- — (15 February 2019). Graphic Science: Seven Journeys of Discovery. Myriad Editions. ISBN 978-0993563324.
- — (7 November 2019). Billionaires: The Lives of the Rich and Powerful. Myriad Editions. ISBN 978-1912408221.
- — (15 February 2022). Putin's Russia: The Rise of a Dictator. Drawn & Quarterly. ISBN 978-1770465046.
  - republished in France as Poutine: L'ascension d'un dictateur. Delcourt. 15 June 2022.
- — (29 May 2024). Elon Musk: Enquête sur un nouveau maître du monde. Delcourt. ISBN 2413086129.
