= Ian Carney =

British comics animation writer

Ian Carney is a British comics animation writer. Born in Liverpool, Merseyside, Carney began writing comics in the 80s for Fleetway Editions in the UK and First Comics and Dark Horse Comics in the US.

He is probably best known in the comics world as co-creator with Woodrow Phoenix of a humorous anthology comic called SugarBuzz published by Slave Labor Graphics, featuring a cast of over fifty characters, the most popular being Pants Ant, who featured in an animated cartoon for Cartoon Network; and the Where's It At, Sugar Kat? series, which was also optioned for film and TV projects by Disney.

He has also created Axis Mundi with artist Garry Marshall, Randy the Skeleton with artist Aidan Potts and A Bagful of Anteaters with artist Jonathan Edwards.

Carney now works primarily as an animation writer in the UK for children's cartoon series. An episode of Shaun the Sheep written by Ian Carney in 2010 was the winner of the US TV broadcasting award, the Emmy.

He has written scripts for shows in the UK, including Chuggington, The Cramp Twins, Bob the Builder, The Hoobs, Shaun the Sheep, Noddy, Tracy Beaker, Metalheads, The Octonauts, Emu, Rubbadubbers, ZingZillas, Noddy, Combo Niños, Nina and the Neurons, Tommy Zoom, Tree Fu Tom and Pinky and Perky. He was co-creator and head writer on the European cartoon series Commander Clark and head writer of Angry Birds Toons.

== Comics ==
- Randy the Skeleton (1996)
- Sugar Buzz! #1-9 (1998-)
- The Skeleton Key/Sugar Kat Special (1998)
- Axis Mundi (Slab-O-Concrete, 1999)
- A Bagful of Anteaters (2003)
- Where's It At, Sugar Kat?: The Thin of the Land (2003) ISBN 0-943151-56-2
- SugarBuzz! Your Ticket to Happiness (2004) ISBN 1-59362-008-X
