= Andi Watson =

British cartoonist and illustrator (born 1969)

- Born: Andrew Watson; 1969 (age 56–57) Kippax, West Yorkshire, England
- Areas: Writer, Artist
- Notable works: Skeleton Key; Breakfast After Noon; Slow News Day; Love Fights; Buffy the Vampire Slayer; Namor

Andrew Watson (born 1969) is a British cartoonist and illustrator best known for the graphic novels Breakfast After Noon, Slow News Day and his series Skeleton Key and Love Fights, published by Oni Press and Slave Labor Graphics.

Watson has also worked for more mainstream American comic publishers including DC Comics, a twelve-issue limited series at Marvel Comics, several series for Dark Horse Comics, and Image Comics.

== Biography ==
Andi Watson was born in the Wakefield Infirmary and raised in Kippax, West Yorkshire by working-class parents. He studied foundation art at Dewsbury college followed by a graphic design / illustration course at Liverpool Polytechnic (now Liverpool John Moores University). He currently lives in Worcester.

=== Early works ===
For his final degree show Watson produced the small press comic Samurai Jam along with T-shirts and bubble-gum cards. The comic was rooted in skateboarding and punk rock culture and artistically influenced by Japanese Manga, specifically Akira, and the American alternative comic Love and Rockets. Three issues were produced by 1993, photocopied with covers spray-painted with a stencil, which generated some interest within the British small press comics scene.

Watson approached various American publishers and was taken on by Dan Vado of Slave Labor Graphics in 1993 who published four issues of Samurai Jam. These were not a success, due in part to the wildly different art styles Watson employed with each issue, but Vado kept the door open and Watson returned in 1995 with Skeleton Key, a monthly 16-page comic that ran for 30 issues and cemented his reputation.

After Skeleton Key Watson moved to Oni Press with Geisha, a graphic novel about a robot girl artist. Rather than approach the issue of her being a robot Watson used the story to examine the ideas of fake and real. The book was an artistic bridge for Watson between the manga-inspired Skeleton Key and his current, more European, style.

=== Later works ===
The Geisha one-shot comic marked a dramatic shift in Watson's style, bringing in stylistic influences from European creators such as François Avril and Dupuy and Berberian, but retaining the slow pacing of long-form Manga. This came to fruition with Breakfast After Noon, a "slice of life" story set in the industrial city of Stoke-on-Trent in Britain. This was followed by the novella Dumped, a love story produced in association with the BIG festival in Turin.

Watson returned to Slave Labor in 2002 with Slow News Day, a graphic novel set around a small town British newspaper which dealt with English attitudes to Americans and the theme of big versus small audience.

He followed that with a one-shot featuring the fox spirit Kitsune from his earlier series Skeleton Key, this time in a tale set in medieval Japan, scripted by Woodrow Phoenix.

He then created twelve issues of a romantic comedy series Love Fights published by Oni and followed that with Paris, a limited series for Slave Labor scripted by Watson with art by Simon Gane.

Recent solo work by Watson has been all-ages stories targeted at children/young adults. Glister is about the adventures of Glister Butterworth – girl-magnet for the weird and unusual who lives at Chilblain Hall. In Princess at Midnight, Holly Crescent leads a sheltered life as a home-schooled girl by day. By night she's Princess of Castle Waxing where she wages a perilous turf war with the Horrible Horde. Both series were published by Image Comics. Both series have since been republished. Glister was published in the UK in an altered, expanded form as a four-book series by Walker Books. Princess at Midnight is currently being serialised online.

Gum Girl features stories about a girl called Grace Gibson, who is a young superhero fighting strange villains in the town of Catastrophe. The four books in this series are published by Walker Books.

His most recent children's series, Punycorn, revolves around a hapless unicorn trying to save a magical kingdom with the help of an allergic dragon and a pugnacious dung beetle.

Top Shelf published his critically acclaimed title The Book Tour in 2020. It was an Official Selection of the Angoulême International Comics Festival, was nominated for an Eisner, and was optioned by MGM Amazon Prime.

=== Work for hire ===
Andi Watson has worked as the writer on a variety of licensed properties, most significantly a 2-year run on the first Buffy the Vampire Slayer comics from Dark Horse Comics and Marvel Comics' Namor.

== Bibliography ==
- Samurai Jam (Slave Labor, 1993, tpb The Complete Samurai Jam, 176 pages, 2003, ISBN 0-943151-74-0)
- Skeleton Key (1995):
  - Skeleton Key v1 : Beyond The Threshold (96 pages, Slave Labor, 2000, ISBN 0-943151-12-0)
  - Skeleton Key v2 : The Celestial Calendar (198 pages, Slave Labor, 1999, ISBN 0-943151-15-5)
  - Skeleton Key v3 : Telling Tales (96 pages, Slave Labor, 2001, ISBN 0-943151-13-9)
  - Skeleton Key v4 : Cats and Dogs (104 pages, Slave Labor, 2000, ISBN 0-943151-19-8)
  - Skeleton Key v5 : Roots (104 pages, Slave Labor, 2000, ISBN 0-943151-26-0)
- Negative Burn: "Skeleton Key: Bring on the Clouds" #44 (Caliber Comics, 1997)
- Dark Horse Presents:
  - "Skeleton Key" (in Dark Horse Presents No. 126, Dark Horse, 1997)
  - Annual 1998: "Skeleton Key: Witch" (Dark Horse, 1998)
  - "Dead Love" (with pencils by David Perrin and inks by Sandu Florea, in Dark Horse Presents No. 141, Dark Horse, 1999, collected in Buffy the Vampire Slayer Omnibus volume 4)
  - "Skeleton Key: Dead Can't Dance" (in Dark Horse Presents vol. 2 #5, Dark Horse, 2011)
  - "Skeleton Key: Room Service" (in Dark Horse Presents vol. 2 #6, Dark Horse, 2011)
  - "Skeleton Key: Lost Property" (in Dark Horse Presents vol. 2 #7, Dark Horse, 2011)
- Buffy the Vampire Slayer #1–11, 13–15, 17–19 (Dark Horse, 1998–2000) collected as:
  - Buffy the Vampire Slayer Omnibus volume 3 (328 pages, February 2008, ISBN 1-59307-885-4) collects previous collections:
    - Remaining Sunlight (collects #1–3)
    - Uninvited Guests (collects #4–7)
  - Buffy the Vampire Slayer Omnibus volume 4 (368 pages, May 2008, ISBN 1-59307-968-0) collects previous collections:
    - Bad Blood (collects #9-11)
    - Crash Test Demons (collects #13–15)
    - Pale Reflections (collects #17–19)
- Geisha (Oni, 1998, tpb The Complete Geisha, 2003, ISBN 1-929998-51-1)
- Aliens vs Predator: Xenogenesis (with pencils by Mel Rubi and inks by Mark Lipka and Norman Lee, 4-issue mini-series, Dark Horse, 1999)
- Breakfast After Noon (200 pages, Oni, 2000, ISBN 1-929998-14-7)
- X-Men Unlimited No. 30 (with Mike Lilly and Jim Mahfood, Marvel, 2000)
- Bizarro Comics (DC Comics, 240 pages, hardcover, 2001, ISBN 1-56389-779-2, softcover, 2003, ISBN 1-56389-958-2):
  - "Wonder Girl vs Wonder Tot" (script, with art by Mark Crilley)
  - "First Contact" (art, with script by Mark Crilley)
- "The One That Got Away" (in Star Wars Tales, Dark Horse, 2001, collected in Star Wars Tales volume 2, May 2002, Dark Horse, ISBN 1-56971-757-5, Titan Books, ISBN 1-84023-442-3)
- Slow News Day (160 pages, Slave Labor, 2001, ISBN 1-59362-080-2)
- Dumped (56 pages, Oni, 2002, ISBN 1-929998-41-4)
- Grendel: Red, White, & Black #2: "Devil's Karma" (Dark Horse, 2002, tpb, 2005, ISBN 1-59307-201-5)
- Hellboy: Weird Tales #1: "Party Pooper" (Dark Horse, 2003, collected in Hellboy: Weird Tales volume 1, December 2003, ISBN 1-56971-622-6)
- Love Fights (2003):
  - Love Fights vol 1 (168 pages, Oni, May 2004, ISBN 1-929998-86-4)
  - Love Fights vol 2 (160 pages, Oni, January 2005, ISBN 1-929998-87-2)
- Namor (with co-author Bill Jemas, and pencils by Salvador Larroca and inks by Danny Miki, 12-issue series, Tsunami/Marvel, 2003)
- Kitsune Tales (with writer Woodrow Phoenix, 48 pages, Slave Labor, 2003, ISBN 0-943151-79-1)
- Little Star (176 pages, Oni, 2005, ISBN 1-932664-38-6)
- Paris (with art by Simon Gane, 5-issue limited series, Slave Labor, 2005–2006, tpb, 144 pages, August 2007, ISBN 1-59362-081-0)
- The Amazing Adventures of The Escapist #8: "Powder Burns" (Dark Horse, 2005)
- Put the Book Back on the Shelf: a Belle and Sebastian Anthology: "I Could Be Dreaming" (Image Comics, 2006)
- Clubbing (with Josh Howard, graphic novel, 176 pages, Minx, 2007, ISBN 1-4012-0370-1)
- Glister (3-issue mini-series, Image Comics, 2007, tpb, 64 pages, October 2007, ISBN 1-58240-884-X)
- Princess at Midnight (64 pages, graphic novel, Image Comics, 2008, ISBN 1-58240-928-5)
- 15 Love (with artist Tommy Ohtsuka, 3-issue mini-series, Marvel, 2011)
- Glister and the Haunted Teapot (64 pages, graphic novel, Walker Books, 2010 ISBN 978-1-4063-2048-0)
- Glister and the House Hunt (80 pages, graphic novel, Walker Books, 2010, ISBN 978-1-4063-2049-7)
- Glister and the Faerie Host (80 pages, graphic novel, Walker Books, 2010, ISBN 978-1-4063-2050-3)
- Glister and the Family Tree (80 pages, graphic novel, Walker Books, 2011, ISBN 978-1-4063-2051-0)
- Gum Girl: Catastrophe Calling! (64 pages, graphic novel, Walker Books, 2012, ISBN 978-1-4063-2939-1)
- Gum Girl: The Tentacles of Doom! (64 pages, graphic novel, Walker Books, 2012, ISBN 978-1-4063-2940-7)
- Gum Girl: Countdown to Destruction! (64 pages, graphic novel, Walker Books, 2013, ISBN 978-1-4063-2941-4)
- Gum Girl: Music, Mischief and Mayhem! (64 pages, graphic novel, Walker Books, 2013, ISBN 978-1-4063-2942-1)
- Princess Decomposia and Count Spatula (176 pages, graphic novel, Roaring Brook Press, 2015, ISBN 978-1-62672-149-4)
- Living Arrangements (152 pages, graphic novel—released only in French translation as Points de chute, Çà et Là, 2016, ISBN 978-2-36990-222-5)
- Glister (304 pages, graphic novel, Dark Horse comics, 2017, ISBN 1-5067-0319-4, 978-1-5067-0319-0)
- The Book Tour (272 pages, graphic novel, Top Shelf, 2020 in English (2019 in French), ISBN 978-1-60309-479-5) (2022 in German) https://de.wikipedia.org/wiki/Spezial:ISBN-Suche/9783946972600
