= Camilla d'Errico =

Comic book illustrator, painter and visual artist

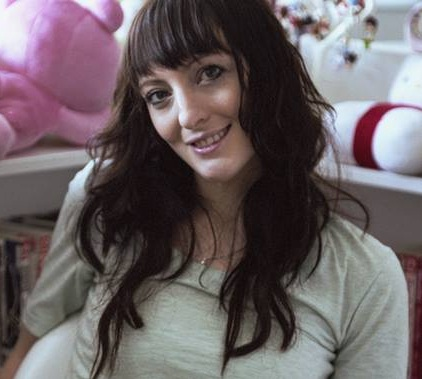
- Camilla d'Errico at her studio in 2014
- Education: Capilano College
- Movement: Lowbrow
- Website: camilladerrico.com

Camilla d'Errico is an Italo-Canadian comic book illustrator, painter, visual artist, and toy designer.

== Career ==
=== Comics ===
Camilla d’Errico has been drawing comic books since 2001. In 2005, she attained her Illustration and Design diploma at Capilano College's IDEA School of Design in North Vancouver. Her first professional comic book project was with Seattle and New York based Committed Comics, for the series Threads. She then took on the role of lead penciler for the four-part mini series Zevon-7. When Zevon-7 creator Quenton Shaw launched QEW Publishing in 2004, Camilla’s creator-owned manga series, Burn, was added to the studio’s project base and was subsequently published by Arcana Studios in May 2008.

In 2006 she was asked to work on the graphic novel for singer Avril Lavigne. Together with Joshua Dysart, d’Errico co-created the two-part graphic novel, entitled Make 5 Wishes, which was published in 2007 by Del Rey Manga and Random House in North America and by Tokyopop in Asia. In 2007, d’Errico became the artist for Serena Valentino’s series, Nightmares & Fairy Tales, published by Slave Labor Graphics, from issue 19 to issue 23.

Image Comics published a five issue miniseries and graphic novel drawn by d'Errico. The mini series is a spin-off story of the video game Sky Pirates of Neo Terra, which is based on d'Errico's artwork. She is also slated to work with writer, Grant Morrison on their creator-owned project The New Bible (previously named Warcop).

=== Painting ===
Camilla d'Errico's career as a painter began in 2006, when she participated in shows at Vancouver's Ayden Gallery in Gastown. Since early 2007, d'Errico began showing her work in galleries across the US and Canada, in Los Angeles, New York, San Francisco, Chicago and Vancouver in what is known as the Lowbrow movement. She is among the group of female artists, including Audrey Kawasaki and Amy Sol, who paint young girls in the Pop Surrealism category.

=== Commercial work ===
In parallel to comics and manga, d'Errico has done illustration and design work for the Walt Disney Company, Ride Snowboards, Hasbro Toys, WizKids, Microsoft Zune for the Zune Hut at Whistler's Telus World Ski & Snowboard Festival, OSO Design House and Ginch Gonch.

Dark Horse Comics has licensed her art for a Journal and Stationery Set, and Punchbrand has used her as their flagship artist for their artists' series Crazyhats and Panda Hoodies. Her work is licensed onto various merchandise, including a line of handbags and accessories, stationery, clothing, computer and phone 'skins', cushions, jigsaw puzzles, postcard sets and sketchbooks. She has a collection of tshirts at Hot Topic in addition to producing her own clothing.

In June 2009, Neverwear.net released a collaborative print by d'Errico and Neil Gaiman based on Gaiman's short story, "How to Talk to Girls at Parties". In August 2009, Dark Horse released its popular collected trade, MySpace Dark Horse Presents Volume 3, containing the short webcomic Vampy Cat Play Friend as well as new cover art, both illustrated by d'Errico.

=== Designer toys ===
d'Errico has worked in vinyl toys, having customized blanks for Ad Funture, Osaka Popstar, the DCTO Jibun Project, Mindstyle & Disney's Stitch Experiment and Hasbro's Mighty Mugg for Lucasfilm's "The Empire Muggs Back" series. She was one of the artists chosen to customize and create a toy for the first Canadian vinyl toy series called Bax Bear.

d'Errico has also released her own designer toy, a plush based on the devil character, "Kuro" from her series, Tanpopo. In 2011 a line of vinyl and resin collectibles was released at San Diego Comic-Con.

=== Techniques and materials ===
d'Errico uses Holbein Aqua Duo paints, which are water-soluble oil paints. She uses these on wooden panels for her colour pieces, and acrylics and inking pens when working on canvas. In some cases, d'Errico will draw a piece by hand, and then colour it digitally on her computer.
