= Haunted Mansion (comics) =

Comic book series

In October 2005, Slave Labor Graphics released a new bimonthly comic book series based on the classic Disneyland attraction, The Haunted Mansion. Each issue has roughly four or five separate stories, as well as a piece of the overarching story "Mystery of the Manse", which recounts the life of Master Gracey. Each issue, except for #3, features a cover by Roman Dirge.

A second, unrelated miniseries by Marvel Comics created for their "Disney Kingdoms" imprint, was released in March 2016. An unrelated graphic novel by IDW Publishing, titled The Haunted Mansion: Frights of Fancy, was released in August 2020.

== October 2005 Issue #1 ==
"Room for a Thousand" written and illustrated by Eric Jones. This follows one new ghost as he enters the mansion, is frightened by the guests such as Madame Leota, the Hatbox Ghost, and the Bride, at first, but eventually joins them, when he learns he can scare humans like his ghostly counterparts.

"Blueprint for Murder" written and illustrated by Jon Hastings. This is the story of how Master Gracey's first two guests, architects Mr. Davis and Mr. Coats (a reference to original Haunted Mansion designers Marc Davis and Claude Coats), were hired to build the house. But Master Gracey favored Mr. Davis' work more than Mr. Coats' work, causing Mr. Coats to lead Mr. Davis astray in the mansion then trapping him tightly in a casket. But Mr. Davis who was the only one who knew how to navigate the mansion caused Mr. Coats to get lost for eternity within the gloomy darkness of Gracey Manor. In the end Mr. Davis became the ghost trying to break out of the coffin in the conservatory and causing Mr. Coats to become the invisible ghost that carries a candelabra.

"While the Fifi is Away" written and illustrated by Roman Dirge. This is a brief story of the ghost pets from the mansion's pet cemetery. Fifi, a poodle belonging to the bride, wishes to be reunited with her master. A ghost cat tries to help Fifi get over it, but realizes he still has one life left. Fifi steals this life and intends to go into the house, but is killed by the bride's falling ring before opening the door.

"The New Groundskeeper" written and illustrated by D.W. Frydendall. The man who currently owns the Gracey Mansion fires groundskeeper Horace Fusslebottom, and makes his own nephew the new groundskeeper. The nephew only wants to find the treasure rumored to be hidden inside, but is scared off by the mansion's undead occupants, who wonder where old Horace is.

"Mystery of the Manse, Pt 1" written by Dan Vado and illustrated by Mike Moss and Brian Belew. This is the first part of the life of Master Gracey. As a first mate on the trade ship Pomona, William Gracey discovers that Captain Pace is secretly a gun-runner. Angered by the captain not telling the crew about this dangerous cargo, he confronts the captain during a storm, but to no avail. A lightning bolt sends the mast down on the captain, and William Gracey proceeds to behead him. From that day on, he was known to the crew as Captain Blood, the pirate.

== January 2006 Issue #2 ==
"The Groundskeeper's Secret" written and illustrated by Christopher. In this tale, the singing busts recount the reasons for Horace Fusslebottom continuing his job as groundskeeper, despite being a coward. His wife is in fact buried in the cemetery, and he spends his dinner break with her ghost. The story is written to the tune of Grim Grinning Ghosts.

"Lenore Meets the Haunted Mansion" written and illustrated by Roman Dirge. Lenore, whose house is next to the Gracey Mansion, is awakened in the middle of the night by the partying going on next door. She heads over to the mansion, only to throw the entire order of things out of whack. After complaining to the organist, she begins to play the organ...for 999 hours.

"The Woman in Black" written by Serena Valentino and illustrated by FSc. This story tells of May, a woman in black said to be sitting on the grave of her dearly departed son. An old man met her ghost as a small boy, telling how she came to enter the mansion. The boy had gotten lost in the swamps, knowing the stories of a woman who would steal children. After meeting her, he ran into the mansion and met a ghost boy named Victor. Madame Leota tells the boy to face his fears, and he leaves, only to meet the woman again. It turns out she is Victor's mother and has been looking for her son. The boy helps the lady to the mansion, and continues to take ghosts there to this day.

"The Big Nap" written by Jon Hastings and illustrated by Jon Morris. This story recounts how Gus, the Lovable Cuss, or better known as the shortest of the hitch-hiking ghosts, went from being a poor shepherd wanting to take a nap, to an accidental prisoner that escaped during a pirate raid, to becoming a ghost, and finally a resident of the mansion who still can't get a quiet nap in, and decides to hitch-hike a ride elsewhere.

"The Mystery of the Manse pt 2" written by Dan Vado and illustrated by David Hedgecook. In the second part of the story of Master Gracey's life, we discover that Master Gracey, now known as Captain Blood, has followed in the footsteps of his former captain by becoming a gun-runner. However, he became too good and resorted to plundering villages. After Port Royal was destroyed, he decided to quit being a pirate, and became William Gracey again. But not before betraying his crew and leaving them to be executed by the authorities. This story deliberately ties the Haunted Mansion to another classic Disneyland attraction, Pirates of the Caribbean.

== May 2006 Issue #3 ==
"Night of the Caretaker's Dog" is written by Chris Reilly and Steve Ahlquist, with art by Crab Scrambly (in a style similar to that of Tim Burton). In it, Horace's dog digs up the legs of the ghost 'Topper McGurk who fell in a mixer at work', who discovers that the dog also took the arm of 'Ethyl White impaled on a kite'. He goes to complain to Horace only to find he's wearing earplugs to sleep. Topper and Ethyl soon discover that the dog is in fact taking care of his puppies, who sleeps on the grave of their mother.

"The Mummy's Curse" is written and illustrated by Christopher. In it, the mummy recounts to his hard-of-hearing friends how he came to be here. He tried to steal an artifact from the temple of Anubis, and was given the curse of 1000 curses, ranging from the seven year itchy scratchies, the curse of the stinky cheese feet, and the curse of the amorous camels. The only way to remove these curses was to pass them on to other people. He did so, and feels he may have been responsible for the problems of the Gracey family. His deaf friend's only reply is "What, a sale on purses at Macy's?"

"The Peppermint Girl" is written by John Habermas and drawn by D. W. Frydendall. In it, a pair of boys named Hawley and Winslow fall for a lonely ghost girl named Mirabelle who smells of peppermint. They offer to dance with her, but since she is doomed to be alone at the dance, they can't. Then they argue over who's going to kill him and dance with her. They thwart each other's plans, and Mirabelle wishes they would realize they're already dead from eating poisoned peppermints.

"Mystery of the Manse pt. 3" written by Dan Vado and drawn by Mike Moss. In this third installment, William Gracey tells how he met a hook-handed lawyer named Brian Belew in New Orleans, who is a confidant of New Orleans' famous pirate defender Jean Laffite. After telling Belew he wants a house, Belew takes him to a mansion on the outskirts of New Orleans that is said to be cursed. Even the designers are said to have disappeared after its completion. Not believing this, Master Gracey walks into the house and eventually realizes the house is in fact haunted. Upon this epiphany, all he can do is laugh and realize he has found the perfect home. This tale slightly contradicts the tale of "Blueprint for Murder," since here Master Gracey doesn't ask for the house to be built and doesn't set the designers against each other. In fact, the house is already occupied by a number of ghouls before Master Gracey buys it.

== August 2006 Issue #4 ==
"The Interview" is written by Dan Vado and drawn by Drew Rausch. In this story, a young woman named Sarah arrives late for an interview for a maid position at the Gracey Mansion. There she meets a maid, who informs her of the house's primary residents, as well as saying she is the only person in the house not a ghost. She introduces Sarah to Madame Leota, who informs Sarah that she ran her car off the road on the way there and is now a ghost. However, Sarah is saved by an emergency crew and is rushed off to the hospital, leaving the mansion short a new housekeeper.

"Big Game" is written and drawn by Aaron A. and tells the story of adventurer Lord Dunswallop through the eyes of his biographer Perkins. Lord Dunswallop has hunted and killed every known foul monster and animal with his bare hands, save one: a ghost. So he enters Gracey Manor hoping to catch one of the barrel fisted "Gracey Ghasts," for his trophy collection. When Perkins asks him how he intends to do it, since ghosts are incorporeal, Lord Dunswallop reveals that he has taken some poison and intends to return to his body later. After leaving his body and entering the grand hall, he is greeted by the ghosts with glee for they now have ghost #992, leaving Perkins unemployed and dragging Dunswallop's massive body outside.

"Night of the Ghost Fleas" is written and drawn by Roman Dirge. This continues the story of Fifi, the ghost dog, and his troubles. He is being plagued by ghost fleas and in a state of panic, runs into the hearse and bumps his head, not understanding this, he then proceeds to wail about his problems until Freddie the ghost bat points out a ghost flea circus on top of the hearse. Fifi then proceeds to destroy the circus, not realizing they have quickly set up shop--on top of his head.

"Mystery of the Manse pt. 4" is written by Dan Vado and drawn by Mike Moss. In this, our ghost host Master Gracey recounts how he met Emily De Claire, with whom he instantly fell in love. They planned to marry, but William couldn't think of letting her live in a haunted house. Desperate, he calls on Madame Leota, who promises to relieve him of his troubles and "make me happier than I had ever been." Spurning her advances, he demands she complete her task and leave. That night, during a storm, Madame Leota discovers the ghosts are the crew of the Pomona, whom Master Gracey had betrayed. She decided to make his home even more appealing to other ghosts instead of ridding it of the current ones. After this, Master Gracey prepares for the wedding, not knowing that in the attic, his former captain is preparing to become the infamous Hatbox Ghost.

== November 2006 Issue #5 ==
"A Dynamite Party" is written and drawn by Devon Devereaux. In this, a man named Steve is invited to the Gracey Mansion and goes (despite his wife's nagging) without pants. Upon entering, his glasses are stolen in secret by a ghost, leaving him blind as a bat. Not realizing the house is haunted or where he's going, he finds himself standing on top of a barrel of dynamite, thinking it's smoked pickled pigs' feet, thus becoming one of the 4 stretching portrait ghosts.

"Blue Loup Garou" is written and drawn by Ben Towle. Here, the Mansion's lone werewolf Bisclavret, or Biscuit, is howling at the moon once again. When asked why, he tells how he and his fellow Loup Garou worked for their demonic vampire-like soul gambler of a master, and did the work of greedy men who bargained their souls for lives of leisure. As Biscuit's master left Biscuit to go make a meal, the evil man claimed his next soul, turning a man who sold his soul, into a werewolf slave. At this time Biscuit made a run for it and hid at the mansion for the night. The next day instead of going to be a human again, he found that he would be trapped at the mansion forever as a wolf, as a punishment for running away. He doesn't mind except he can't get a decent bite to eat. Even the fish are ghosts!

"The Follow-Up Interview" is written by Dan Vado and drawn by Drew Rausch. This short piece is a continuation of last issues "The Interview". Sarah tries to convince her boyfriend Steve that she's not crazy when she talks about ghosts. Now she longs to return to the afterlife she was pulled from.

"Pickwick Capers" is written and drawn by Jon "Bean" Hastings. Here we learn that Pickwick, seen hanging from the chandelier in the ballroom, was in fact scared of heights in his mortal life. He became something of a mole burglar, until he comes to America, upon hearing of Gracey Manor's pirate treasure, he decides to sneak in through the last resting place of "M. T. Tomb". However, he is done in by the madness of the stretching room, only to find he has lost his fear of heights.

"Mystery of the Manse Pt. 5" is written by Dan Vado, drawn by Mike Moss, with lettering assistance by Eleanor Lawson. On the eve of Master Gracey's wedding, his bride to be goes in search of "something old" in the attic. She finds the Hatbox Ghost, Gracey's former Captain Pace whom Madame Leota summoned, who reveals that her beloved husband to be was a murderer. Master Gracey rushes up to the attic to find his new bride newly deceased, either from fright or a broken heart. The Hatbox Ghost reveals that Madame Leota is responsible for his new life going awry, and leaves him with the ghosts of his crew whom he sent to their deaths. Master Gracey murders her in a fit of rage. With his new life in shambles, Gracey hangs himself from the ceiling, hoping to end his misery. As always at Gracey Manor, all is not what it seems.

== May 2007 #6 ==
"Doom of the Diva" is written and drawn by Alice Price and Andy Price. It tells the story of Baronessa Elda, a famous opera singer who was eventually fired for her ego. She received an invitation to sing at Gracey Manor, which she graciously accepts. However, once she figures out her audience is made up entirely of ghosts, she runs out frightened and falls over a landing, her braid acting as a noose. Now she lives among them as the Viking Ghost, leading them all in song. This story is unique in referencing both the new black widow bride and the Haunted Mansion Holiday.

"Mystery of the Manse Pt. 6" is written by Dan Vado, drawn by Mike Moss, with lettering by David Hedgecock. In the final chapter, Master Gracey explains how since Leota was killed so quick mid-trance, her soul never realized she was dead. And now ghosts from all over the world heard her cries and came to Gracey Manor. The only living thing in the house was the maid Michelle, who decided to keep her master's treasure safe and continue playing maid. She even hired numerous other girls, one of whom inherits the house and fortune when Michelle dies to join the party. Master Gracey eventually learned how to leave his body so he could keep watch over the house. However, no one, not even the ghosts, dare to go to the attic where Emily lies.

"The Final Interview" is written by Dan Vado and illustrated by Drew Rausch. In the last chapter of the potential maid Sarah, her boyfriend Steve arrives at the mansion planning to stop her from killing herself. She arrives after him, and runs into Dick the groundskeeper (named Horace in previous stories) and his dog, Boney. He tells her that the party is not as fun as she expects, and that she must have something to live for. Meanwhile, Steve sees her outside and tries to reach her, only to be literally scared to death, making him spirit #1000. Upon this turn of events, the devil clock strikes 13 and the entire house and grounds are swallowed into a void, leaving only Sarah, the maid, Dick, and Boney. Dick's last line is "Well...I didn't see that coming," creating stares from the survivors.
