= Ethan Nicolle =

American comic book creator

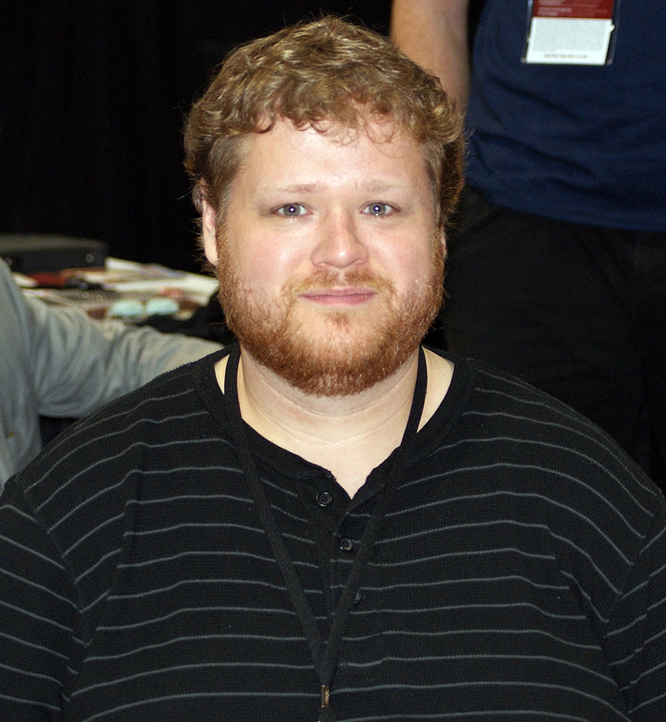
- Nicolle in June 2011
- Born: 1979 or 1980 (age 45–46)
- Occupations: Artist, illustrator, writer
- Writing career
- Pen name: Eef
- Years active: 1995–present
- Genre: Comic books
- Notable works: Chumble Spuzz; Axe Cop
- Website: ethannicolle.com

Ethan Nicolle (born 1979 or 1980) is an American comic book creator, artist, and writer. He created the Slave Labor Graphics comic Chumble Spuzz which has been released as two graphic novels so far. He also worked with his younger brother, Malachai, to create Axe Cop. From 2019 to 2021, Nicolle was the creative director for The Babylon Bee, a news satire website. From 2022 to 2025, Ethan worked as a scripted creator for The Daily Wire.

== Biography ==
Ethan Nicolle grew up in Coos Bay, Oregon and attended North Bend High School.

Nicolle was honored as the special guest at the Alternative Press Expo in San Francisco on November 1, 2008.

== Bibliography ==
Comics work includes:

- The Drug Busters (1991)
- Various issues of The Barker (1995–1998)
- The Hall #1 (1997)
- The Hall #2 (1997)
- The Cloacal Collection: A Cartoon Collection (2000)
- Check Your Shoes: A Cartoon Collection (2001)
- Creep (2003) (written by Brinton Williams) (Conspiracy Productions)
- Eef: A Cartoon Collection (2003)
- Puppet Terrors (with Jesse Wroblewski) (2005)
- The Weevil (2006)
- Lunaractive: Code of the Juggernaut (an abandoned project that has only been displayed as a part of Ethan Nicolle's official Blog) (2007)
- Chumble Spuzz: Kill the Devil (2008)
- Chumble Spuzz Volume 2: Pigeon Man and Death Sings the Blues (2008)
- Eef's Sketch Book (2008)
- Jesus Christ: In the Name of the Gun (2008)
- Sumo Poop: A Collection of Horrible Cartoons (2008)
- Axe Cop: Volume 1 (2011)
- Axe Cop: Vol. 2 Bad Guy Earth (2011)
- Bearmageddon (web comic) (2011)

== Awards and honors ==
- Special Guest honor at the 2008 Alternative Press Expo
- Best Humor Publication nomination 2009 Eisner Awards
- Artist of the Week of Pixelated Geek for February 10, 2010 for his work on Axe Cop.
- Special Guest at San Diego Comic Con in 2011.
- Favorite Web-based Comic award 2011 Eagle Awards for his work on Axe Cop.
- Web Comic of the Year award 2011 Shel Dorf Awards for Axe Cop.
- Top Ten Graphic Novels for Teens 2012 YALSA list YALSA Top 10 Graphic Novels 2012.
