= D. W. Frydendall =

D. W. Frydendall is a comic book artist best known for his horror art. Born in Los Angeles he grew up in Arcadia, a suburb outside of Pasadena, California. At an early age he showed an aptitude at drawing creatures such as the Wolfman. In interviews he claims he was a "strange" child. D.W. was highly influenced by illustrator Harry Clarke's art in an illustrated book of Edgar Allan Poe's writings.

== Comic and illustration work ==
D. W. Frydendall is currently based in Los Angeles. His first work Catseye Agency was published by Rip Off Press in 1991. His work has been in White Wolf Games The World of Darkness series, The Haunted Mansion (comic) by Slave Labor Graphics and Satans 3-Ring Circus of Evil. He's a regular artist for Girls and Corpses Magazine. He also contributed to Creepy from Dark Horse Comics. In 2005 he released a collection of his pen and ink works entitled "The Creeps" from Burnside Publications.

In 2026 it was announced that Frydendall would be providing illustrations for a line of stories called the "Warrior Angel Saga", authored by composer/horror author Andy DiGelsomina. The first story, entitled "Shadows of Nyarlathotep" will be published February 2027.

== Album cover art ==
D.W. has done extensive work doing artwork for bands such as Calabrese, The Ghastly Ones, Speedbuggy, The Black Mondays, The Impossible Ones, Back to Zero, Thee Spectors, T.S.O.L. and Time Machine.

== T.V. and film ==
D.W. has done extensive work in the film industry doing storyboards. Such films include: Mosaic (1995), Psycho Sushi (1997), Beowulf (1999), Tube Dwellers (1999), Last Flight Out (2004), Pledge of Allegiance (2003), Bunnywhipped (2006). His commercial work includes spots for Heineken, Audi, Scion, Verizon, Red Bull and Jon Bon Jovi.

In 1999 D.W. started doing storyboards for Disney's One Saturday Morning show Tube Dwellers. For a season his duties included storyboarding and animatics. For the third season he took over as director.

D.W. has also done designs for such films as Beowulf (1999), and has done several jobs as a creature designer.

== Publications ==
- Frydendall, D.W. (2005). The Creeps. Burnside Publications. ISBN 0-9766413-0-5
- Frydendall, D.W. (2006). Satan's 3 Ring Circus of Hell. Asylum Press. ISBN 0-9768509-0-7
- Frydendall, D.W. (2006). The Haunted Mansion Issue 1: The New Groundskeeper. Slave Labor Graphics. ISBN 1-59362-029-2
- Frydendall, D.W. (2006). The Haunted Mansion Issue 3: Peppermint Girl. Slave Labor Graphics. ISBN 1-59362-038-1

== Sources ==
- Herd Publishing Interview
- Livid Looking Glass Interview
- Bloody-Disgusting Interview by Dave Ehrlich
- Savage Tattoo Magazine Interview
- Dead Boy Pro Interview
