= Vincent Batignole =

French comic-book artist

Vincent Batignole is a French comic-book artist who has provided the artwork for the popular indie comic Gloomcookie, written by Serena Valentino, and published by Slave Labour Graphics. Batignole is also currently collaborating with Valentino again on the comic project Enchanted.

Other projects he is currently developing including: Justin, and The Greatest Show on Earth.

== Works ==
- ne boit que du the!
- Serena Valentino (March 2007). The Final Curtain. Illustrator Vincent Batignole. ISBN 978-1-59362-066-0.
