= Axe Cop =

American webcomic

- Axe Cop logo
- Author: Malachai Nicolle
- Illustrator: Ethan Nicolle
- Website: axecop.com
- Current status/schedule: Hiatus
- Launch date: December 2009
- Genre(s): Action, parody

Axe Cop is a webcomic by brothers Malachai Nicolle (age 5 when the series began) and Ethan Nicolle (age 28 when the series began). Malachai is responsible for the ideas and stories, while Ethan turns them into comics. The first four comics were drawn in December 2009 and posted to Facebook; the website was not launched until January 2010.

The site also features Ask Axe Cop, a series of comics where Axe Cop responds to questions from readers.

The webcomic has been highly praised, leading to a publishing deal with Dark Horse Comics for both a limited online and print run.

== Synopsis ==
Axe Cop is about the adventures of a police officer who prefers to wield an axe in battle. He is a gruff, tough man, dedicated to killing bad guys. The comic focuses on the times he is called away from the daily grind to help with more complex problems such as rescuing a child from a zombie dog woman, helping Bat Warthog Man find his friends, or babysitting. This generally involves fighting bad guys including the bad guys from other planets. Axe Cop has gathered a loyal team. His first ally is Flute Cop, who goes on to become Dinosaur Soldier (upon exposure to dinosaur blood) and shapeshifts into other forms in other episodes. Axe Cop gained other allies, including Ralph Wrinkles, Sockarang, Leaf Man, Baby Man, The Wrestler, Uni-Man, Uni-Baby, Wexter, Presty, Best Fairy Ever, Bat Warthog Man, Army Chihuahua, Gray Diamond, Liborg, Water Queen, and more.

Axe Cop episodes are nominally set in the present day, enlivened with aliens, dinosaurs, zombies, robots, etc., and the episodes tend to feature whatever topic happens to be on the writer's mind, like sea creatures, brains, and especially babies. Little effort is made to keep track of back stories, powers, and equipment. This is not to say that the comic is entirely chaotic: the main characters and their relationships stay consistent, there are persistent world-building elements (most notably the shapeshifting properties of being splattered with blood or a fruit's juice), and a number of powers and items recur (e.g. the hypnotize button on Axe Cop's wrist has not been mentioned again, but the robot arms in his mustache are explained).

== Background ==
Ethan Nicolle had already written the critically praised graphic novel Chumble Spuzz when he got the idea to write Axe Cop. The idea arose when Ethan was playing pretend with his brother, who invented the Axe Cop persona. At the time, the elder Nicolle was working on a graphic novel that he wanted to release as a webcomic, and he intended to use Axe Cop as a way of practicing the medium.

== Characters ==
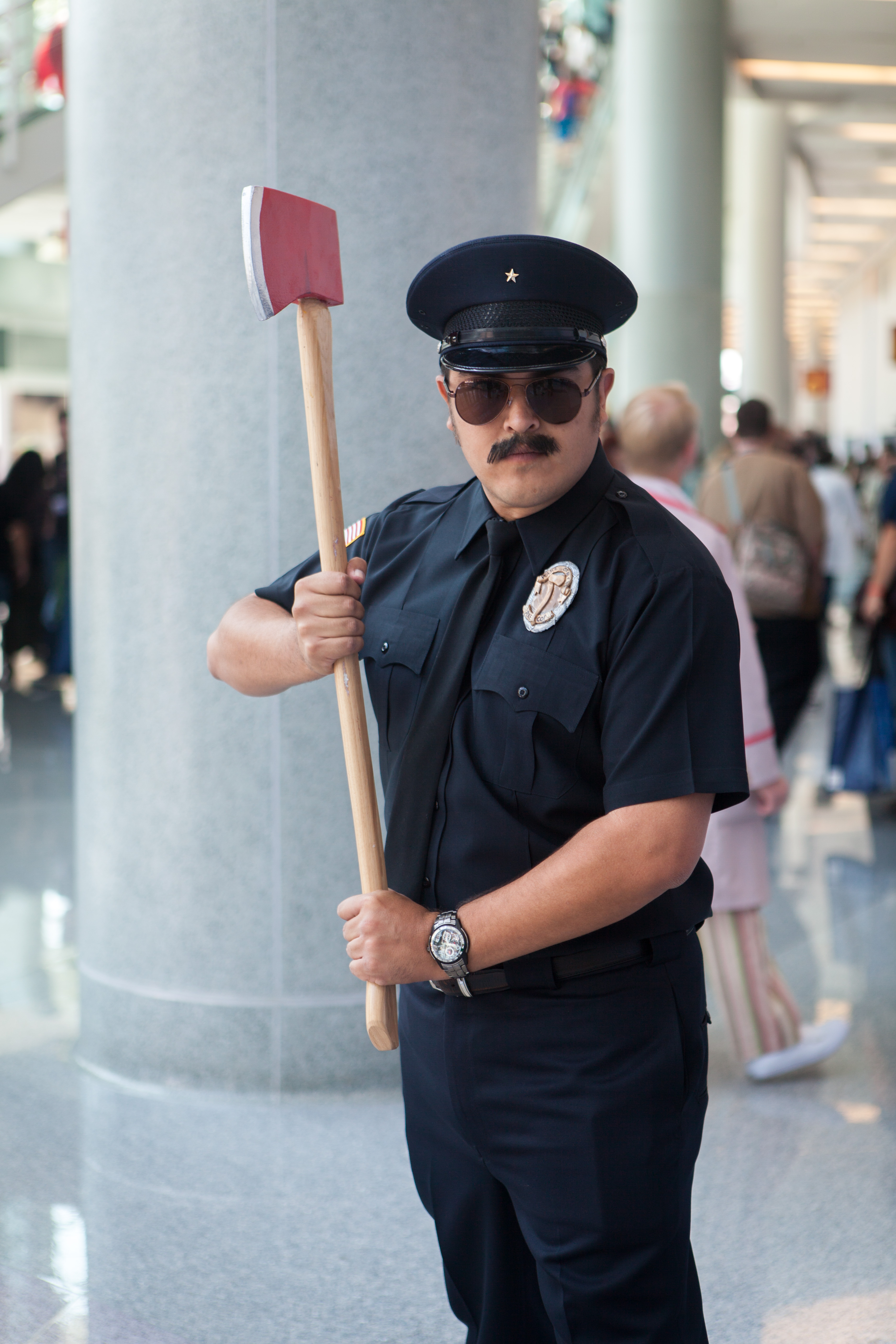
A cosplayer portraying Axe Cop at Wondercon 2014.

- Axe Cop – The main character. Axey Smartist is a police officer who finds a firefighter's axe and uses it when fighting crime. Married to his job, he works the "always shift" by sleeping for only two minutes. At night he wears a black cat suit and kills bad guys in their sleep. His battle cry is "I will chop your heads off!". When faced with a challenge, he will hold "try outs" to build a team. At one point, he was married to a female Abraham Lincoln until she divorced him upon seeing him with Water Queen. Since the divorce, Axe Cop was revealed to be a match for every woman in the universe as he tries relationships with Rainbow Princess from Rainbow World, Frog Queen from Frog World, Cloud Princess from the Cloud Kingdom, and Axe Girl from Axe World. Axe Cop later got engaged to Water Queen and adopted Max and Sammy.
- Flute Cop – Axe Cop's shapeshifting first partner and brother. Flutey Smartist was the brother of Axey Smartist until they bumped their heads enough to forget that they were related. In the TV series, he underwent a partial brain transplant performed by Uni-Man causing him and Axe Cop to forget that they were brothers. Spilled dinosaur blood mutates him into "Dinosaur Soldier". Eating an avocado mutates him into Avocado Soldier, and with Uni-Baby's horn he mutates into Uni-Avocado Soldier. He returns to being Flute Cop upon borrowing the unicorn horn from Super Uni-Man's navel, only to mutate in Ghost Cop (thanks to a wish by Axe Cop), Drag-Tri-Ghostacops Rex (this form has dragon wings, Triceratops head horns, a Tyrannosaurus head and torso, and ghost arms and legs upon asking Uni-Man to mutate him into this form), and Viking Cop (upon being exposed to Viking blood). He's usually depicted in his Dinosaur Soldier form. He wields a machine gun and can also shoot avocado bombs out of his hands. In the TV series, Flute Cop is engaged to a police secretary named Anita where they raise Uni-Baby when Uni-Man is busy.
- Uni-Baby – A baby with a unicorn horn that grants wishes. Her father is Uni-Man and was stolen from him by Evil Fatsozon's minions in a plot to throw it at Earth. Uni-Baby was once used by Telescope Gun Cop to get revenge on Axe Cop. Uni-Baby's horn was later confiscated by Avocado Soldier, but was returned to her upon her being returned to her father. In the TV series, Uni-Baby is raised by Flute Cop and Anita when Uni-Man is busy.
- Ralph Wrinkles – Axe Cop's dog. Ralph originally belonged to the Snoward Family, but was given to Axe Cop as thanks for saving their family from an evil Snowman and an Evil Singing Tree with an annoying voice. When Uni-Avocado Soldier used the powers of Uni-Baby's horn, Ralph gained the ability to talk and later acquired numerous other powers like healing lasers. Upon a wish being granted by Super Uni-Man, Ralph Wrinkles learned karate.
- Sockarang – A friend of Axe Cop and member of his team. He has socks for arms that he can throw as boomerangs, and a golden chainsaw attached to one of his arms. During the fight with Bad Santa, Sockarang's sock arms were exposed to Bad Santa's blood mutating Sockarang into Good Bad Santa. He's in a relationship with the Best Fairy Ever.
- Baby Man – A man in a giant baby suit who is one of Axe Cop's allies. He originally only had the power to fly when he gasses. After eating a special dinner with his family, he also gained the ability to produce explosive eggs, phones, and cars.
- The Wrestler - An unnamed pro wrestler who occasionally teams up with Axe Cop. His design seems to be based on the Ultimate Warrior.
- Uni-Man - A unicorn-horned inhabitant of the planet Smart World who is the father to Uni-Baby. Uni-Man is so smart that he grew a unicorn horn. The condition that caused this soon affected every inhabitant of Smart World until the planet became Uni-Smart World when it grew a unicorn horn as well. Uni-Man took up crimefighting when he couldn't find Uni-Baby. Uni-Man can also grant wishes, though he usually serves as Axe Cop's equipment specialist as he's a brilliant scientist. When he used the second unicorn horn to grow unicorn horns all over his body during the fight with Doctor Stinkyhead, he became Super Uni-Man where he can shoot his unicorn horns at his opponents and has super-strength.
- Wexter - Axe Cop's pet T-Rex who was first seen in "Ask Axe Cop #8." He has gatling guns for arms, breathes fire, and can fly. He also has a "super-duper fast bite". He feeds on people trespassing on Axe Cop's property. Wexter can also sprout spikes if any bad guy tries to ride him. With the help of Dragony Dragon Witch, Wexter gained the ability to shapeshift into a Dragon-T-Rex with robot wings in order to travel to Zombie World. In the TV series, Wexter was created by Uni-Man.
- Presty - Presty is a pug that was adopted by Ghost Cop. He can teleport after being touched by Ghost Cop and was granted the ability of super awesome biting by the Queen of England.
- Best Fairy Ever - The only girl allowed on Axe Cop's team; Presty's Dad brought her out of the television. She carries poison shrink spray and poison giant spray, and can use her small size to attack bad guys from within. She has also fallen in love with Axe Cop while Sockarang has developed a relationship with her.
- Bat Warthog Man - Bat Warthog Man started out as an ordinary man (who resembled Rod Serling) who turned to crimefighting after his superhero friends were stolen. He gained the combined powers of a bat and a common warthog after he was bitten and tusked by the two animals in their combined Bat Warthog form (their combined form was the result of their collision). He also mutates into a hybrid version of both at night since his bat-half is nocturnal. Bat Warthog Man has the original Bat Warthog in a cage underneath his house as a way to recharge his powers. In the TV series, Bat Warthog Man's friends were named after some characters from Happy Days.
- Gray Diamond - Gray Diamond is a diamond-themed superhero who lived in the same city as Axe Cop. He can shapeshift his hands into diamond swords that also shoot diamonds. Grey Diamond is also a super-genius; his brain is within the large diamond in his head. Like Army Chihuahua's human form, Gray Diamond had fought in the war against Chicken Head where his friend Sergeant L was killed in battle. When Gray Diamond was given Sergeant L's brain by his mother, he obtained the components which created Liborg. Following the fight with the King of All Bad Guys, it was discovered that Gray Diamond was given Sergeant T's brain by mistake.
- Wolver Man - A wolverine-themed superhero who can fly and claw people. He is a parody of Superman and Wolverine.
  - Iron Spider-Cannon - Wolver Man's pet Spider-Cannon who can shoot bolts and fire tornadoes. Iron Spider-Cannon has a mouse brain where Axe Cop used its imagination to obtain a unicorn horn to reclaim Psydrozen from two bad guys that were using it to guard Invisible King Bad Guy Planet #2.
- Army Chihuahua - A soldier with the power to shapeshift into a chihuahua when he is ready to fight. When he was just a soldier, he fought against the forces of Chicken Head where his friend Sergeant T fell in battle leading the soldier to kill Chicken Head with a grenade. When the soldier returned home and found that he forgot to feed his pet chihuahua before the war, he was bitten by his hungry pet as a result. Because he is always ready to fight, he is always in his chihuahua form. Army Chihuahua is also shown to have poison in his fangs as seen when he bit off the tails of some of the villains that were on Lightning Boy and Rainbow Girl's side.
- Gray Stone - Gray Stone is a large-headed, rock-skinned alien who can shapeshift into a large rock monster, reprogram robots to join his team, and find aliens.
- Liborg - Liborg is a superhero that resembles a cyborg lion who is described to be the "Ultimate Soldier." Liborg used to be a fellow soldier of Gray Diamond, named Sergeant G, who was killed by Chicken Head. Only his brain was left behind, which Sergeant L's mother gave to Gray Diamond in order to bring him back to life (since Sergeant L was all that she had). Gray Diamond came up with the idea to combine Sergeant L's brain with the brain of a lion and added a cheetah brain as well because "cheetahs are super fast." Gray Diamond went to the jungle to knock out a lion and a cheetah to obtain their brains. Upon combining half of each brain together, Grey Diamond was able to put Sergeant L's brain into the cybernetic body with a lion's head and Liborg was born. Following the fight with the King of All Bad Guys, Army Chihuahua's human form and Liborg recognized each other because Gray Diamond had actually been given Sergeant T's brain by mistake. In the TV series, there are no references to the brain mix-up and Liborg says his name when he arrives at a location.
- Max and Sammy - Max and Sammy were two boys whose parents work in an atomic science lab. When their parents were killed in an explosion at the atomic science lab due to an experiment with monkey and bat DNA, Max and Sammy were blown into space where they unknowingly drank the juices from the resulting experiment mutating Max into a humanoid bat and Sammy into a humanoid monkey. Due to Sammy having been badly injured upon crashing into the graveyard of an alien planet that was in the middle of a war, Max searched for someone who could help heal his brother, and found an alien soldier who helped heal Sammy. However, an undead hand grabbed onto Sammy's tail, giving him the power of the undead where he can even summon zombies to aid him. Max and Sammy are taken in by the alien's family where their species had no name. Upon being educated by the aliens, Max developed laser-shooting eyes while Sammy developed hypnotic powers. When the planet exploded during the evacuation to Earth, killing the parents, Max and Sammy ended up in foster care until their foster parents used up all their fostering time, and both of them were on the streets when the Foster Agency closed. Axe Cop later adopted them. When it came to saving Water Queen and stopping an alien invasion by the Aubber Aliens, Uni-Man used his wish-granting powers to create costumes for Max and Sammy where Max became Super Bat-Boy and Sammy became Hypno-Monkey Boy. Super Bat-Boy and Hypno-Monkey Boy later developed the ability to combine into Super-Hypno Monkey-Bat Man.
- Water Queen - A female hero and ruler of Water Planet who can generate water. She was Axe Cop's love interest when they went to the same karate dojo back when Water Queen was Water Princess. The Aubber Aliens once captured Water Queen in order to provide a water source for them. After Axe Cop saved Water Queen, she helped to kill the Aubber Aliens. Afterwards, Axe Cop and Water Queen got engaged and adopted Max and Sammy.

== Critical reception ==
Entertainment Weekly listed the comic as their "Site of the Day" on January 28, 2010. In her review, Margaret Lyons described it as "all kinds of silly fun" and asked, "Are we looking at the next great comic franchise?" The Detroit News said in their review, "'Axe Cop' is a hoot." GQ named the comic their "Time Waster of the Day" on February 4, 2010.

In response to the success of the online comic, Nicolle was approached by several comic publishers to print an Axe Cop series. With help of the Gotham Entertainment Group, Nicolle found that both he and Dark Horse Comics had the same level of interest in the publishing deal, and accepted their offer. Dark Horse published an ashcan copy of Axe Cop for the 2010 San Diego Comic-Con, which included the first five episodes of the webcomic and some of the "Ask Axe Cop" strips. Dark Horse published the 3-issue Axe Cop miniseries "Bad Guy Earth" in the second quarter of 2011.

== Awards and honors ==
- Special Guest at San Diego Comic-Con in 2011.
- Favorite Web-based Comic award 2011 Eagle Awards.
- Web Comic of the Year award 2011 Shel Dorf Awards.
- Top Ten Graphic Novels for Teens 2012 YALSA list YALSA Top 10 Graphic Novels 2012.

== In other media ==
=== Comic books ===
Dark Horse Comics had collected the comics into individual volumes:

- Volume 1 (144 pages, January 2011, ISBN 1-59582-681-5) –
- Volume 2: Bad Guy Earth (collecting Axe Cop: Bad Guy Earth #1-3, 104 pages, October 2011, ISBN 1-59582-825-7) – Uni-Man has made a Good Guy Machine that turns all bad guys into good guys where Axe Cop demonstrates it by turning Pseudo Goodis into Handcuff Man. The Psychic Brothers (consisting of Psychic Boss and Psychic Helper) from Psychic Planet steal the Good Guy Machine in order to convert it into a Bad Guy Machine to build an army of bad guys.
- Volume 3 (160 pages, April 2012, ISBN 1-59582-911-3) –
- Volume 4: President of the World (96 pages, July 2013, ISBN 978-1-61655-057-8) – Axe Cop has become the President of the World. A mad scientist from Mars named Dr. Tuwo recruits an army of aliens (consisting of giant robots, the Apple Men from Apple Planet, the inhabitants of Soccer Planet, and every other alien) in a plot to attack Earth.
- Volume 5: Axe Cop Gets Married and Other Stories (February 18, 2014, ISBN 9781616552459) – After a messy divorce with Abraham Lincoln, Axe Cop is determined to find a new wife to help raise his newly adopted bat and monkey children in Axe Cop Gets Married! Also features the epic bowser battle story The Dogs, multiple "Ask Axe Cop" episodes, guest comics, "Axe Cop Presents," and much more awesomeness!
- Volume 6: American Choppers (December 2, 2014, ISBN 9781616554248) – Axe Cop reunites with Super Axe, an old friend from college, and the two of them decide to start a superteam of axe-wielding heroes to defend America called The American Choppers. They are joined by Captain Axe, Axe Girl, Axe Woman, Axe Dog, and other axe-wielding heroes. The only problem is that there are no bad guys left, but that all changes when mysterious giant creatures attack the city.

=== Television ===
Axe Cop premiered on Fox on July 21, 2013, as a part of the channel's Animation Domination HD programming block. The series consisted of 12 11-minute episodes in its first season.

A second season of Axe Cop, first announced by Ethan Nicolle on the Axe Cop website, began airing on FXX on April 16, 2015, and concluded on June 25, 2015.

=== Web series ===
Another animated version of Axe Cop aired on the YouTube channel Rug Burn. The animation was done as motion comics based on the original web comic strips.

=== Other venues ===
An expansion for Steve Jackson Games' "Munchkin" featured Axe Cop, with art drawn by Ethan.

Axe Cop made a cameo appearance in the second issue of the indie comic book series, The Danger-Squad created by Duran Rivera and published by CrinkleCo Studios.

Axe Cop was the subject of a 2012 song by American thrash metal band Lich King.
