= Odd job =

Odd job or Oddjob may refer to:

== Entertainment ==
- Oddjob, a James Bond villain
- Oddjob (comics), a comic book series
- Oddjobs, a music group
- Odd Jobs (1986 film), an American comedy film
- Odd Jobs (1997 film), an American TV movie
- Odd Jobs (play), a 1985 Canadian play
- Odd Job (film), a 2016 film
- The Odd Job, a 1978 comedy film
- "Odd Jobs" (The Fairly OddParents episode)
- "Odd Job" (Faith in the Future), a 1995 television episode

== Other uses ==
- Handyman, work
- Stanley Odd Jobs, a tool produced by Stanley Works from 1888 to the 1930s
- OddJob (Trojan horse), a computer security malware
- Odd Job Trading, a retail closeout store which folded in the early 2000s
