= Tales from the Heart =

- The cover of A Tale From the Heart of Africa: Bloodlines (Epic Comics, 1992). Artwork by Brian Stelfreeze.

Publication information
- Publisher: Entropy Enterprises; Slave Labor Graphics; Epic Comics
- Schedule: irregular
- Format: Ongoing series
- Publication date: 1987–May 1994
- No. of issues: 11

Creative team
- Written by: Cindy Goff, Rafael Nieves
- Penciller: Seitu Hayden

Collected editions
- A Tale from the Heart: Temporary Natives: ISBN 0-87135-651-1
- Bloodlines: Tales from the Heart of Africa: ISBN 0871358638

Tales from the Heart is the title of a series of comic books and graphic novels, written by Cindy Goff and Rafael Nieves and illustrated by Seitu Hayden. Told through the eyes of protagonist Cathy Grant, the comics detail the adventures of a Peace Corps volunteer in the Central African Republic in the mid-1980s. The work explores why so much effort by so many volunteers wrought so little change. Later stories delve into the reign of the mad dictator Jean-Bédel Bokassa.

== Publication history ==
The first two issues of the ongoing series were published by Entropy Enterprises in 1987, with nine later issues published by Slave Labor Graphics (from 1988 to 1994). Slave Labor published Tales from the Heart: Hearts of Africa in 1994, which collected issues #1-3 and featured an introduction by Neil Gaiman.

Two color graphic novels, Tales from the Heart of Africa: The Temporary Natives (1990) and A Tale From the Heart of Africa: Bloodlines (1992) were published by the Marvel Comics imprint Epic Comics.

== Creators ==
Cindy Goff based Tales from the Heart on her own experiences as a Peace Corps volunteer in the Central Africa Republic in the years 1983-1985.

Artist Seitu Hayden was born in Fort Wayne, Indiana, and attended the Chicago Academy of Fine Arts. He has spent most of his career doing commercial and advertising arts, and has illustrated comic book biographies of Barack Obama and Malcolm X.

== Awards ==
A Tale From the Heart of Africa: Bloodlines (Epic, 1992) was nominated for two Eisner Awards in 1993, for Best Single Issue, Self-Contained Story; and Best Graphic Album — New.
