= Truth Serum (comics) =

Independent comic book series by Jon Adams

Truth Serum is an independent comic book series created, written and drawn by author Jon Adams.

== Overview ==
Originally published as a mini comic in 2001 and given away for free, it appeared as a three-issue mini series published by Slave Labor Graphics in 2002. In 2004, it was translated and published by Italian publisher Alta-Fedelta.

In 2006, the Slave Labor Graphics mini-series, along with a long-running story from the Dark Horse Comics website and some new material was collected and self-published by City Cyclops as a 128-page oversized volume. The second Truth Serum book, Truth Serum: The Lonely Parade was published in 2007. In 2008 Truth Serum Conversations was published. It's a limited edition, full-color collection of the weekly strip.

Currently, it appears as a weekly web comic at Dark Horse's site, as well as the official Truth Serum site.

== Awards ==
- 2007 Truth Serum was nominated for two Eisner Awards; Best Humor Publication and Best Graphic Album Reprint.

== Sources ==
- The 2007 Eisner Awards: 2007 Master Nominations List
