= Rafael Nieves =

America comic book writer

- Born: January 24, 1960 (age 66)
- Area: Writer
- Notable works: Tales from the Heart

Rafael Nieves (born January 24, 1960) is an American comic book writer and designer, with over thirty years experience in the field. He began his career with the publication of Tales from the Heart, first published by Entropy Enterprises before moving, with issue #3, to Slave Labor Graphics.

The series, co-written with Cindy Goff, and based on her experiences, told the story of Cathy Grant, a Peace Corps volunteer stationed in Central Africa in the 1980s, chronicling her trials and tribulations as a "stranger in a strange land." It was illustrated by artist William "Seitu" Hayden.

Tales from the Heart spawned two full-color one-shots published by Epic Comics, Marvel Comics' creator-owner label, and the latter, Bloodlines, was nominated for two Eisner Awards in 1993 (Best Single Issue, Self-Contained Story; and Best Graphic Album — New).

Since then, Nieves has worked for a number of publishers, including Marvel Comics (Hellstorm, Prince of Lies), Caliber Comics (Orlak, Edgar Allan Poe's The Bells), Comico Comics/Northstar (Cold-Blooded), Moonstone Books (The Phantom, Welcome Back, Mr. Moto, Vampire: The Masquerade) and Transfuzion Publishing (The Apocalypse Plan) .

He has self-published a number of titles, like Bob Howard: Plumber of the Unknown (with artist Dan Dougherty), the yearly anthology 10/31 (with various contributors), Forgotten Lore, a compendium of short comics stories (with various artists), and Grace Before The Fall (with Antonio Maldonado and Ken Wolak).

== Sources ==
- Zona Negativa
- Komikwerks
- Comics Alliance
