= GameNOW =

Video game magazine

Issue #18 (April 2003): The Legend of Zelda: The Wind Waker

GameNOW (occasionally abbreviated to GN) was a United States-based video game magazine that was published by Ziff-Davis from November 2001 to January 2004. A total of 27 issues were published. In addition to video game consoles like PlayStation 2, Xbox, GameCube, and Game Boy Advance, GameNOW also covered games for personal computers.

== History ==
GameNOW's roots began in July 1994 when the popular magazine Electronic Gaming Monthly launched a spin-off magazine called EGM^{2}. EGM² was essentially "another EGM," only without a reviews section and a greater emphasis on import games.

Starting in August 1998, EGM² became Expert Gamer (often abbreviated to XG), and the magazine's focus shifted away from news and previews to strategy and tricks. Despite the different name, XG continued EGM²'s numbering system. XG lasted for 39 issues until October 2001 (with the last issue being XG #88).

The next month (November 2001), XG was replaced by GameNOW. Although GameNOW maintained a healthy tricks section and occasional strategy guides, the magazine's focus shifted to in-depth previews and reviews. Targeted to a younger audience than that of EGM (16 year-olds, while also appealing to 10-15 year-olds), GameNOW concentrated less on industry insider-type features and more on the actual video games, including numerous large screenshots and elaborate feature articles.

In November 2002 (issue #13), the GameNOW staff was almost completely replaced when Ziff-Davis moved its video game magazines from the Chicago suburb of Oak Brook, Illinois to San Francisco, California. Of the original staff, only two writers made the move to California. Shortly after the move, the magazine underwent a massive redesign.

== Staff ==
The magazine's original editorial staff consisted of the following crew:

- Editor-in-Chief - Dan Leahy
- Managing Editor - Justyn Harkin
- Associate Editors - Phil Theobald, Ethan Einhorn
- Senior Art Director - Carey Wise
- Associate Art Directors - Dave Malec, Mark Manzo (Mark would eventually become an Associate Editor)

Once the magazine was relocated to San Francisco, the staff consisted of:

- Editor-in-Chief - Tom Byron
- Managing Editor - Carrie Shepherd
- Associate Editors - Phil Theobald, Ethan Einhorn, Miguel Lopez, Sushi-X
- Senior Art Director - Andrew Burwell
- Associate Art Director - Nicole Tanner

== The return of Sushi-X ==
GameNOW #16 (February 2003) featured the return of the EGM review ninja, Sushi-X. An expert on fighting games, an actual photo of Sushi never appeared in the magazine. Instead, he was always shown as a pixelized, 16-bit era sprite. Even in this form, he still featured his trademark red keikogi, katana, and sai.

Sushi's reviews differed from the other editors' reviews in that they were written with more flowery prose and were peppered with references to his ninja training and his quest for enlightenment.

== Magazine departments ==
Like most magazines, GameNOW features many recurring sections. These included:

=== Regular sections ===
- Rants & Raves - GameNOW's letters section was popular among its readers for its humorous and sarcastic tone. GameNOW wasn't afraid to poke fun at its readers, and many readers would write in hoping to be "zinged" in the pages of the magazine. Rants & Raves was home to several inside jokes among GameNOW's readership, including the frequent use of a particular screenshot from the PlayStation game Final Fantasy VIII.
- GameNOW Gallery - A two-page spread that focused on showing large screenshots and character artwork from upcoming games. This section is notable for featuring a spread highlighting Rare's original character designs for Joanna Dark in Perfect Dark Zero (issue #15, January 2003) and a spread showing several screenshots from the unreleased GBA game Shantae Advance (issue #25, November 2003).
- Hot 10 - A previews section that counted down the top ten best games coming out each month.
- Now Playing - GameNOW's review section. The magazine's review scale was much like a school's report card, with grades ranging from A+ to F. A C grade denoted that the game was average.
- The A+ Club - A section that called special attention to all the games that received GameNOW's highest review score, an A+.
- The F Troupe - The polar opposite of The A+ Club. This section called out every game that received GameNOW's lowest score, an F. The F Troupe's mascot was Poo, an anthropomorphic piece of cartoon poop that the GameNOW editors created in the PlayStation 2 game Magic Pengel.
- Tricks Now - A multi-page section near the back of the magazine that contained cheat codes for the latest games.
- Animal Crossing Bulletin Board - A small feature than ran within the Tricks Now section from issue #14 (December 2002) to issue #25 (November 2003). It featured strategies for the Nintendo GameCube game Animal Crossing and original patterns that could be recreated with the game's pattern designer. Among the custom patterns were the GameNOW logo and a recreation of GameNOW's legendary Final Fantasy VIII screenshot.

=== Fan Club ===
When GameNOW began, Fan Club was the name of the letters section that ran in the back of the magazine. Starting with issue #4 (February 2002), the Fan Club section was expanded to include regular (and often humorous) mini-features in addition to the reader mail.

In issue #14 (December 2002), the letters section was moved to the front of the magazine and renamed Rants & Raves. The mini-features were retained in the now expanded Fan Club section in the back of the magazine.

Among the regular mini-features were:

- Top Ten - Although these top ten lists were often played straight by counting down the top ten games in a specific series or genre, there were occasional lists that were made for laughs.
- Crap from the Past - Poked fun at terrible older video games.
- Hot or Not - A lighthearted look at what the editors were into that month.
- Gamerdex - Inspired by the Pokédex from Nintendo's Pokémon series, this section highlighted a different type of gamer, including an illustration of the gamer.
- Gaming Evolution - Took a video game character or series and traced its evolution from its humble beginnings to its current success. The section also made note of the subject's most embarrassing moments.
- Fan Letter Art - Envelope art sent in by the GameNOW readers.
- $10 Treasures - Discussed discount games available for the PlayStation.
- Giuseppe Contelli's What If? - A spotlight for long-time EGM², Expert Gamer, and GameNOW reader Giuseppe Contelli's nonsensical "What If" scenarios. A prime example: What if Bullet Bill did attract Joanna Dark and she reads the inscription, "I am in love with yours" on him?
- Cool Job - A short interview with video game industry insiders where they explained what their job involved and how they got it. A notable interview subject was Charles Martinet, Nintendo's voice of Mario.
- Super Lucky Love Love Japan - A section that highlighted import games, anime-based games, and anime. This section is an evolved version of the old feature, Super Lucky Imports.
- Game Critter Super-Squad! - A comic strip by cartoonist Jeremy "Norm" Scott, the creator of Hsu and Chan (of which GCSS was a spin-off).

== April Fools ==
It's a tradition among Ziff-Davis' video game magazines (particularly Electronic Gaming Monthly), to plant an April Fools joke in the April issue. During its brief history, GameNOW only had one April Fool's joke.

In issue #6 (April 2002), on page 42, there was a one-page preview for an Xbox game called Metal Gear Solid X. Before Metal Gear Solid 2: Substance was announced for either PlayStation 2 or Xbox, GameNOW ran this preview for the fake game. MGSX was said to be an Xbox port of the PlayStation 2 game, Metal Gear Solid 2: Sons of Liberty. The biggest selling point of this game was that after playing through the game once, a bonus mode was unlocked, allowing a play through the game again as the series' main hero, Solid Snake, instead of MGS2's hero, Raiden.

Additionally, extra features in the Solid Snake mode included the return of Nastasha Romanenko (from the original Metal Gear Solid), a boss fight against Revolver Ocelot, the chance to assist Raiden in battles from the first play-through (this time from Snake's point of view), and access to previously locked areas of Big Shell.

The preview featured seven very convincing (yet phony) screenshots of the new features. The two screenshots that show Snake wandering through a red office building were photographs of the GameNOW offices that had their colors altered and the Metal Gear characters inserted into them. In the first-person screenshot that shows Snake in a helicopter shooting down at a Harrier jet, the hand holding the gun belongs to Mike Vallas, the man who created the fake screens.
