= Alternative Press Expo =

Comic book festival and alternative comics convention

- Status: Defunct
- Genre: Alternative comics convention
- Frequency: Annual
- Venue: San Jose Civic Auditorium (1994–1999); Herbst Pavilion (2000–2002); Concourse Exhibition Center (San Francisco) (2003–2013); San Jose Convention Center (2015–2017)
- Locations: San Jose, California (1994–1999, 2015–2017); San Francisco, California (2000–2014)
- Country: United States
- Inaugurated: June 4, 1994; 32 years ago
- Founder: Dan Vado
- Most recent: 2017
- Organizer: Slave Labor Graphics (1994, 2015–2017); Comic-Con International (1995–2015)
- Website: www.alternativepressexpo.com

The Alternative Press Expo (APE) was a comic book festival and alternative comics convention that operated from 1994 to 2017. Founded by Slave Labor Graphics publisher Dan Vado, APE focused on self-published, independent, and alternative cartoonists and comic publishers.

== History ==
APE was organized by Vado in 1994 as an event for artists to "promote themselves without having to drown out a 50-million-watt display by some huge publisher." The first APE was held as a one-day event in San Jose, California.

Vado transferred management of APE to Comic-Con International, the organizers of San Diego Comic-Con, in 1995. The organization Friends of Lulu produced its first LuluCon (held at the Hyatt Sainte Claire) in conjunction with the 1997 Alternative Press Expo.

The event expanded to two days of programming in 1998, and included special guests Mike Allred, Jhonen Vasquez, Terry Moore, Batton Lash, Shannon Wheeler, and Jill Thompson. In 2000, APE moved to San Francisco, where it was held a one-day event at the Herbst Pavilion in Fort Mason, before moving to the Concourse Exhibition Center in 2003. The programming available at the event expanded under Comic-Con International, with APE 2005 offering panels, seminars, exhibitions and special guests. APE was moved to the fall beginning in 2008.

The final APE organized by Comic-Con International was held in 2014. Vado re-assumed management of the event that year, and returned APE to San Jose in 2015. The most recent APE was held in 2017, with special guests Jhonen Vasquez and Derf Backderf. As of 2019, the event is no longer produced.

== Event dates and locations ==
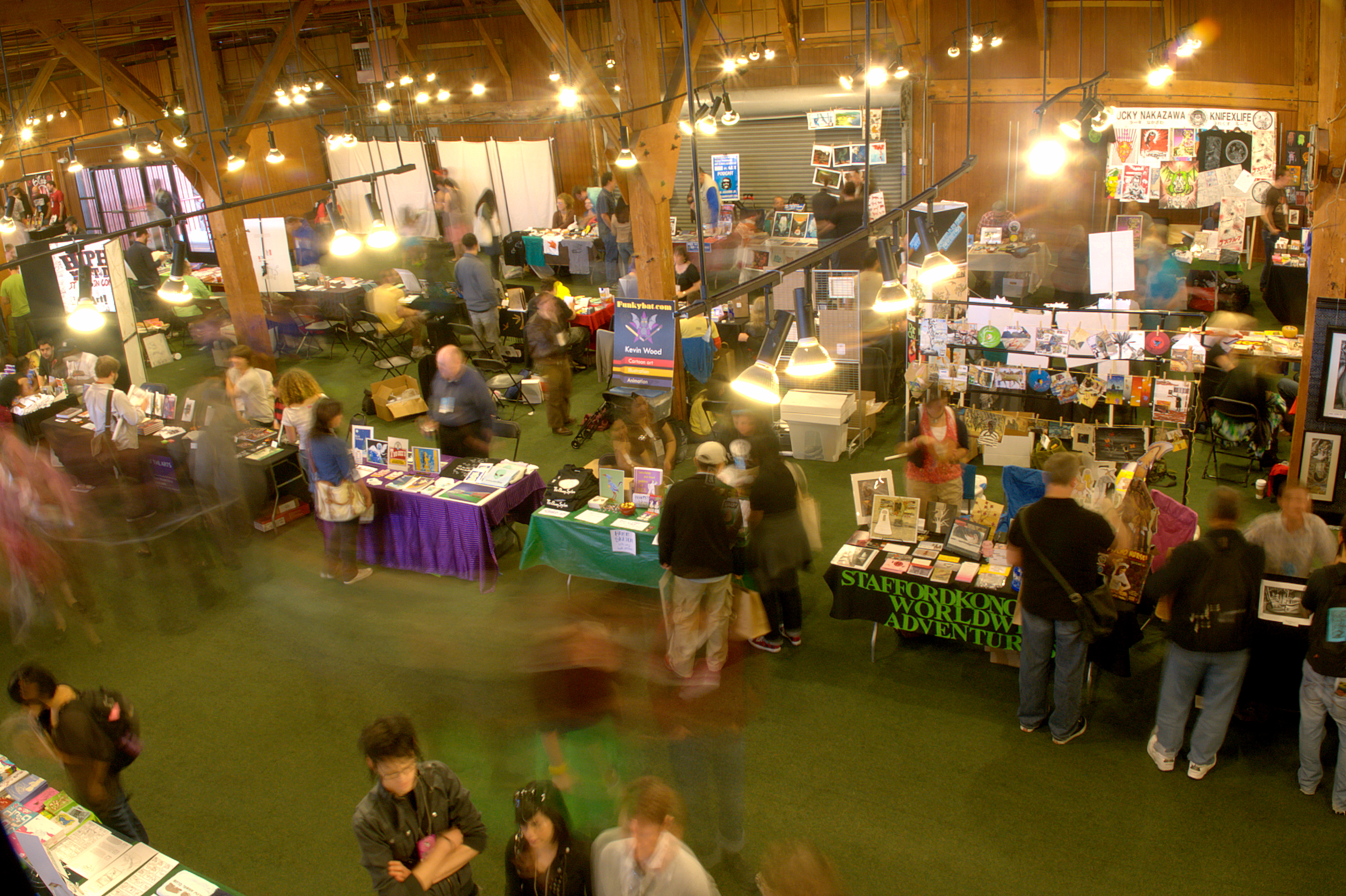
Alternative Press Expo 2010

- 1994: June 4 — Parkside Hall, San Jose
- 1995: May 19 — Parkside Hall, San Jose
- 1996: March 23 — San Jose
- 1997: February 1 — San Jose Civic Auditorium, Exhibit Hall A, San Jose
- 1998: February 21–22 — San Jose Civic Auditorium, Parkside Hall, San Jose
- 1999: February 27–28 — San Jose
- 2000: February 5 — Herbst Pavilion, Fort Mason, San Francisco
- 2001: February 17–18 — Herbst Pavilion, Fort Mason, San Francisco
- 2002: February 9–10 — Herbst Pavilion, Fort Mason, San Francisco
- 2003: February 1–2 — Concourse Exhibition Center, San Francisco
- 2004: February 21–22 — Concourse Exhibition Center, San Francisco
- 2005: April 9–10 — Concourse Exhibition Center, San Francisco
- 2006: April 8–9 — Concourse Exhibition Center, San Francisco
- 2007: April 21–22 — Concourse Exhibition Center, San Francisco
- 2008: November 1–2 — Concourse Exhibition Center, San Francisco
- 2009: October 17–18 — Concourse Exhibition Center, San Francisco
- 2010: October 16–17 — Concourse Exhibition Center, San Francisco
- 2011: October 1–2 — Concourse Exhibition Center, San Francisco
- 2012: October 13–14 — Concourse Exhibition Center, San Francisco
- 2013: October 12–13 — Concourse Exhibition Center, San Francisco
- 2014: October 4–5 — Festival Pavilion, Fort Mason, San Francisco
- 2015: October 3–4 — San Jose Convention Center, San Jose
- 2016: October 8–9 — San Jose Convention Center, San Jose
- 2017: September 23–24 — San Jose Convention Center, San Jose
