= Electronic Gaming Monthly =

American video game magazine

- Issue 100, November 1997
- Editorial Director: Josh Harmon
- Categories: Video game journalism
- Frequency: Monthly
- Publisher: EGM Media, LLC
- Founder: Steve Harris
- Founded: 1988
- First issue: March 31, 1989; 37 years ago
- Final issue Number: Summer 2014; Issue 264
- Country: United States
- Based in: Lombard, Illinois
- Language: English
- Website: egmnow.com
- ISSN: 1058-918X

Electronic Gaming Monthly (EGM) was a monthly American video game magazine. It offered video game news, coverage of industry events, interviews with gaming figures, editorial content and product reviews.

== History ==
The magazine was founded in 1988 as U.S. National Video Game Team's Electronic Gaming Monthly under Sendai Publications. In 1994, EGM spun off EGM², which focused on expanded cheats and tricks (i.e., with maps and guides). It eventually became Expert Gamer and finally the defunct GameNOW. After 83 issues (up to June 1996), EGM switched publishers from Sendai Publishing to Ziff Davis. Until January 2009, EGM only covered gaming on console hardware and software.

In 2002, the magazine's subscription increased by more than 25 percent.

The magazine was discontinued by Ziff Davis in January 2009, following the sale of 1UP.com to UGO Networks. The magazine's February 2009 issue was already completed, but was not published.

Spring 2010 cover, featuring Mass Effect 2

In May 2009, EGM founder Steve Harris purchased the magazine and its assets from Ziff Davis. The magazine was relaunched in April 2010 by Harris's new company EGM Media, LLC, widening its coverage to the PC and mobile gaming markets.

Notable contributors to Electronic Gaming Monthly have included Martin Alessi, Ken Williams (as Sushi-X), Jim Allee, "Trickman" Terry Minnich, Andrew "Cyber-Boy" Baran, Danyon Carpenter, Marc Camron (later Director of Operations), Mark "Candyman" LeFebvre, Todd Rogers, Mike Weigand A.K.A. Major Mike (now Managing Editor at GamePro Magazine), Mike Desmond, Al Manuel, Howard Grossman, Arcade Editor Mark "Mo" Hain, Mike "Virus" Vallas, Jason Streetz, Tim Davis, Ken Badziak, Scott Augustyn, Chris Johnston, Che Chou, Dave Ruchala, Crispin Boyer, Greg Sewart, Jeanne Trais, Jennifer Tsao, artist Jeremy Norm Scott, Game Scholar Leonard Herman, Shawn "Shawnimal" Smith, West Coast Editor Kelly Rickards, Kraig Kujawa, Dean Hager, Jeremy Parish and Mark Macdonald (who later went on to become director of Gamevideos.com before leaving Ziff-Davis). Writers who also served stints as editor-in chief include Ed Semrad, Joe Funk, John Davison, James Mielke, artist Jeremy "Norm" Scott, Dan "Shoe" Hsu and Seanbaby. In addition, writers of EGM's various sister publications – including GameNow, Computer Gaming World/Games for Windows: The Official Magazine, Official U.S. PlayStation Magazine – would regularly contribute to EGM and vice versa.

The magazine is known for making April Fools jokes. Its April 1992 issue was the source of the Sheng Long hoax in Street Fighter II: The World Warrior.

=== Web-only relaunch (2019–present) ===
In March 2019, EGM announced that it was going to relaunch "later [that] year" into an outfit that would have "a new look and a focus on long-form features, original reporting, and intelligent critique." It entered under the backronym "Enjoy Games More".

In a letter in April 2020, editor Josh Harmon announced that the site would no longer publish long-form articles, prompting speculation that the publication had shut down. Harmon edited the announcement shortly afterwards to confirm that the site would continue "some form of daily news coverage".

In October 2024, EGM launched a Kickstarter campaign for a retrospective book about the history of the magazine, titled The Electronic Gaming Monthly Compendium. The campaign reached its fundraising goal of $35,000 within less than 24 hours of its launch.

=== Game of the Year ===
Year	Game	Genre	Developer(s)
1988	Double Dragon	Beat 'em up	Technōs Japan
1989	Ghouls 'n Ghosts	Platform	Capcom
1990	Strider	Platform	Capcom
1991	Sonic the Hedgehog	Platformer	Sonic Team
1992	Street Fighter II	Fighting	Capcom
1993	Samurai Shodown	Fighting	SNK
1994	Donkey Kong Country	Platformer	Rare
1995	Twisted Metal	Vehicular combat	SingleTrac
1996	Super Mario 64	Platformer	Nintendo EAD
1997	GoldenEye 007	First-person shooter	Rare
1998	The Legend of Zelda: Ocarina of Time	Action-adventure	Nintendo EAD
1999	Soulcalibur	Fighting	Namco
2000	Tony Hawk's Pro Skater 2	Sports	Neversoft
2001	Halo: Combat Evolved	First-person shooter	Bungie
2002	Metroid Prime	Action-adventure	Retro Studios
2003	Prince of Persia: The Sands of Time	Action-adventure	Ubisoft Montreal
2004	Halo 2	First-person shooter	Bungie
2005	Resident Evil 4	Survival horror	Capcom
2006	The Legend of Zelda: Twilight Princess	Action-adventure	Nintendo EAD
2007	BioShock	First-person shooter	Irrational Games
2008	Grand Theft Auto IV	Action-adventure	Rockstar North
2009	Uncharted 2: Among Thieves	Action-adventure	Naughty Dog
2010	Red Dead Redemption	Action-adventure	Rockstar San Diego
2011	The Elder Scrolls V: Skyrim	Action role-playing	Bethesda Game Studios
2012	Far Cry 3	First-person shooter	Ubisoft Montreal
2013	BioShock Infinite	First-person shooter	Irrational Games
2014	Dragon Age: Inquisition	Action role-playing	BioWare
2015	The Witcher 3: Wild Hunt	Action role-playing	CD Projekt Red
2016	Overwatch	First-person shooter	Blizzard Entertainment
2017	The Legend of Zelda: Breath of the Wild	Action-adventure	Nintendo EPD
2018	Red Dead Redemption 2	Action-adventure	Rockstar Games
2019	Control	Action-adventure	Remedy Entertainment
2020	The Last of Us Part II	Action-adventure	Naughty Dog
2021	Psychonauts 2	Platform	Double Fine
2022	Elden Ring	Action role-playing	FromSoftware

== Magazine structure ==
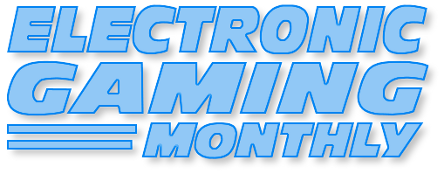
Second revision of the EGM logo

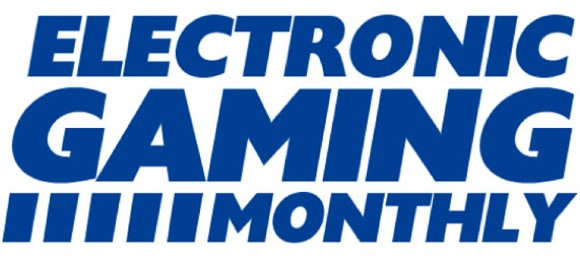
Fifth revision of the EGM logo

The magazine includes the following sections:

- Insert Coin
  - Letter from the editor – the editorial
  - Login – Letters from readers and replies by the magazine
- Press Start
  - This section contains a general article about video gaming
  - EGM RoundTable – discussions around video games
  - The Buzz – industry rumors
  - The EGM Hot List – background information about a critically acclaimed game
- Features – feature articles
  - The EGM Interview – interview with a person from the gaming industry
  - Cover Story – preview of the game featured on the magazine cover
  - Next Wave – previews of upcoming games
  - Launch Point – short previews of upcoming games
- Review Crew – review section
  - Review Recap – recapitulation of the review scores from the preceding issue
- Game Over – Commentary articles on video gaming related topics

=== The Review Crew ===
EGM's review scale is based on a letter grade system in which each game receives a grade based on its perceived quality. Games are reviewed by one member (originally a team of four until the year 2000, then a team of three, and finally knocked down to one in 2008), except for "the big games", which were reviewed by one of a pool of editors known as "The Review Crew." They each assign a grade to the game and write a few paragraphs about their opinion of the game. The magazine makes a strong stance that a grade of C is average. Towards the top of the scale, awards are given to games that average a B− or higher from the three individual grade: "Silver" awards for games averaging a grade of B− to B+; "Gold" awards for games averaging a grade of A− or A; and "Platinum" awards for games with three A+ grades. The current letter grade system replaced a long-standing 0–10 scale in the April 2008 issue. In that system, Silver went to a game with an average rating from 8 to 9, Gold to a game reviewed at 9 to 10 and Platinum to a game that received nothing but 10 ratings. Until 1998, as a matter of editorial policy, the reviewers rarely gave scores of 10 and never gave a Platinum Award. That policy changed when the reviewers gave Metal Gear Solid four 10 ratings in 1998, with an editorial published half a year before announcing the shift.

In addition, they gave the game (or multiple games in the event of a tie, as with Grand Theft Auto: San Andreas for Xbox and NCAA Football 2006) with the highest average score for that issue a "Game of the Month" award. If a "Game of the Month" title receives a port to another console, that version is disqualified from that month's award, such as with Resident Evil 4, which won the award for the Nintendo GameCube version and subsequently received the highest scores for the PlayStation 2 port months later and Tony Hawk's Pro Skater 2, which won the Platinum award for two separate versions of the game.

In 2002, EGM began giving games that earned unanimously bad scores a "Shame of the Month" award. As there is not always such a game in each issue, this award is only given out when a game qualifies.

Originally, a team of four editors reviewed all the games. This process was eventually dropped in favor of a system that added more reviewers to the staff so that no one person reviewed all the games for the month.

Though the scores ranged from 0–10 on the previous numerical scale, the score of zero was almost never utilized, with exceptions being Mortal Kombat Advance, The Guy Game and Pals.

During the HSU period, each issue ended a short humorous message placed after the copyright and disclaimer text on the final page

== International expansion ==
EGM en Español was released in Mexico in November 2002. It was published by Editorial Televisa and edited by a different staff. Sometimes the content was more focused to the Latin American gaming crowd (e.g. soccer games were paid more attention than NASCAR or American football games), as well as the humor and other features. Sometimes it featured jokes among the Mexican community and sometimes supported the production with a poster. Adrián Carbajal “Carqui”, with a long experience in Mexican gaming magazines (prior to EGM en Español, he worked in now competitor publications Club Nintendo and Atomix), was the editor-in-chief through the entire run. There was a weekly official podcast called "Playtime!" hosted by most of the editorial staff. EGM en Español has been cancelled as of December 2008 due to Ziff Davis Media's economical problems.

EGM Italia was published in Italy by Edizioni Star Comics S.r.l. from 2001 to 2003. EGM was also published in Brazil as EGM Brasil by Conrad Editora since April 2002. Since the last quarter of 2005, EGM Brasil was being published by Futuro Comunicação. With the suspension of U.S. sales of the EGM, the Brazilian EGM was rebranded to EGW (Entertainment + Game World).

In 2006 three other editions of EGM were published around the world. EGM Thailand is published by Future Gamer Company Ltd., EGM Singapore is published by MediaCorp Publishing and EGM Turkey is published by Merkez Dergi.

EGM Turkey got closed in January 2009 for financial crisis.

== Internet presence ==
In 1995, EGM's first online website was nuke.com. It merged with GameSpot in 1996 after Ziff-Davis purchased Sendai Media Group. In 2003, EGM created a new website, 1UP.com, after GameSpot was sold to CNET Networks. Since the magazine's relaunch in 2010, the affiliated website has been egmnow.com.

EGM Live* was a podcast hosted every Monday by the editors of EGM on 1UP.com. The podcast was available for download at 1UP.com or the iTunes music store. Much like other podcasts on the 1UP network, the program could include discussion of various message board topics, an analysis of new games being reviewed, a mailbag section, a deeper look into the most recent issue of the magazine, or interviews with special guests such as Marcus Henderson and Ted Lange from Harmonix and Cliff Bleszinski from Epic Games. The "*" at the end of the name was to denote that the podcast was not actually "live" in the general media sense. It was later replaced by 1UPFM, another weekly Monday podcast where 1UP crew members Nick Suttner and Phil Kollar hosted the show, along with other 1UP members.

== EGM2 ==
EGM2
- Cover of the first issue of EGM2 (July 1994): Super Street Fighter II vs. Mortal Kombat II
- Publisher: Sendai
- First issue: July 1994; 32 years ago
- Final issue: July 1998
- Country: U.S.
- Language: English

EGM2 (stylized as EGM^{2}) was a video game magazine published by Sendai Publishing from July 1994 to July 1998 as a spin-off of Electronic Gaming Monthly. Unlike EGM, however, EGM2 lacked a reviews section and had a greater emphasis on import games.

Starting in August 1998, EGM2 became Expert Gamer (often abbreviated as XG). Although with a different name, XG continued EGM2's numbering system. XG lasted for 39 issues until October 2001 (with the last issue being XG #88).

=== History ===
The first issue of EGM2 was in July 1994. The magazine lasted 49 issues with the last issue under the original name coming out in July 1998. The change of name prompted a cleaner looking redesign although the content of the magazine would remain the same.

== Reception ==
In a 2014 retrospective, Polygon said: "For two decades, EGM maintained a focal position in the games media landscape. In the time before the internet, the periodical was a vital conduit for American readers interested in the hobby." In 2025, Time Extension included EGM2 on their list of "10 Forgotten Gaming Magazines That Are Worth Remembering".
