= Hsu and Chan =

Comic strip

Hsu and Chan is a comic strip created by Jeremy "Norm" Scott that appeared in the video game magazine Electronic Gaming Monthly from November 1999 until the September 2008 issue. The strip has appeared at 1UP.com until September 30, 2009 when the blog ended and Norm promised to continue the comic at spookingtons.com. Full-length comic books of Hsu and Chan have also been published by Slave Labor Graphics, as well as a trade paperback collecting the first five issues of the comic.

Norm began publishing a spin-off comic of Hsu and Chan, titled Game Critter Super-Squad!, in 2003. Following the adventures of 11-year-old Jimmy "Milhouse" Patton, Game Critter Super-Squad! ran for a year in GameNOW. More recently, animated shorts of the characters were produced and are available at the Spookingtons website. Additional comics and videos were produced in 2017 through Patreon funding.

== Background ==
Hsu and Chan follows the misadventures of the brothers Hsu and Chan Tanaka, who own and operate a company called "Tanaka Bros. Game Development" that specializes in knock-offs of popular titles. For example, Bad Milage 2000, a knock-off of Gran Turismo appears in the strip "Hsu and Chan in: Chan Turismo!"

Tanaka Bros. Game Development has other, less seen employees, including Arnie, a ground squirrel bearing a striking resemblance to Sonic the Hedgehog, Gila Mobster, a brutish Charmander parody who can be seen wearing a black fedora with a lighter grasped in the end of his tail, and Chernobyl, the radioactive chipmunk who is a take on Pikachu.

The name Dirk appears frequently as a replacement for a random name ("Ledger of Zelda") or for anagrams and codenames ("Pocket Morons: Platinum"; "Sonic Boobs"). Many comics also make references to Cheez-its, usually with characters noticing crumbs (This was also done in "The Otters: The Survivors"). Many references are made to the Tomb Raider series, usually referring to the newer games as crimes against humanity.

The first comic to spin off from Hsu and Chan was Game Critter Super-Squad!, which ran in EGM's now-defunct sister magazine, GameNOW. This strip follows the midadventures of 11-year-old Jimmy "Milhouse" Patton (a human) and the Game Critter Super-Squad, a team consisting of Arnie, Sonic the Hedgehog, Gila Mobster, and X, an anthropomorphic, green letter X who works for Microsoft.

== Slave Labor comics ==
After three years with EGM, Norm contacted Slave Labor Graphics about making a standalone, full-length Hsu and Chan comic book. Slave Labor agreed, with eight issues of the comic published between 2003 and 2009. A collection of the first five of these along with extra bonus material was released in 2004 and titled Hsu and Chan: Too Much Adventure.

Since the EGM strips are typically one page long, they are self-contained stories that parody a specific video game, usually the title on that month's cover of EGM. The Slave Labor comics, on the other hand, are considerably longer and more reliant on plot. The Slave Labor comics are also less video game-centric and feature Hsu and Chan battling supernatural foes and their arch-rivals at the competing video game company, Yamamoto Games, Inc.

Norm's naturally wordy dialogue is slightly toned down for the EGM strip, a necessary compromise given the single page nature of the strip. In the Slave Labor comic, the characters are more verbose.

Despite the separate focuses of the two different strips, they exist within the same universe. In the Slave Labor comics Hsu's right hand is severed and replaced with a prosthetic appliance; the change was reflected in the EGM strip.

== Video game parodies ==
The following games have been featured and parodied in the Hsu and Chan EGM strips:

- Driver - (Drivel)
- Final Fantasy - (Final Fantasize)
- Kingdom Hearts - (Hearts o' Darkness)
- Grand Theft Auto - (Hsu Crime Stories)
- James Bond 007 series - (Thunderblarg)
- Resident Evil - (Zombierama)
- The Lord of the Rings - (Lords of the Bling, Hoard of the Things)
- Gran Turismo - (Chan Turismo)
- Metal Gear - (Secret Agent Chan)
- Phoenix Wright, Ace Attorney - (Jerk Simpkins, Ace Attorney [Under Fire])
- Super Mario Bros. - (Down the Drain)
- Pokémon - (Pocket Morons, Pocket Morons Platinum)
- Sonic the Hedgehog - (Sonic Boobs, Sonic Weirdos)
- Castlevania - (Symphony of the Nut)
- The Legend of Zelda - (The Ledger of Zelda)
- Halo - (Combat: Involved!)
- Soul Calibur - (The Soul Still Burns, Low Calibur)
- Halo 3 - (Halo How Are You?)
- Super Smash Bros. Brawl - (Prelude to a Brawl)
- SOCOM: Confrontation - (So Conned)
