= Rex Libris =

- Cover to Rex Libris #1. Art by James Turner

Publication information
- Publisher: Slave Labor Graphics
- Schedule: Quarterly
- Format: Standard
- Publication date: Aug. 2005 - Oct. 2008
- No. of issues: 13
- Main character: Rex Libris

Creative team
- Created by: James Turner
- Written by: James Turner
- Artist: James Turner

Rex Libris is a science fiction / humor comic book series written and illustrated by James Turner. It was published quarterly from 2005 to 2008 by Slave Labor Graphics.

== Publication history ==
Thirteen issues were published from August 2005 to October 2008.

- Rex Libris #1 (August 2005): "I, Librarian"
- Rex Libris #2 (November 2005): "Labyrinth of Literature"
- Rex Libris #3 (February 2006): "Leap of Faith"
- Rex Libris #4 (May 2006): "Battle on Benzine!"
- Rex Libris #5 (August 2006): "Tea with Vaglox"
- Rex Libris #6 (November 2006): "Book of Monsters"
- Rex Libris #7 (February 2007): "Monster Merry-go-Round!"
- Rex Libris #8 (May 2007): "Escape From the Book of Monsters"
- Rex Libris #9 (August 2007): "In the Grip of OGPU!"
- Rex Libris #10 (January 2008): "A Cock and Bull Story"
- Rex Libris #11 (April 2008): "R'lyeh Rising"
- Rex Libris #12 (August 2008): "Space Balls... of Evil!"
- Rex Libris #13 (October 2008): "Convergence of Chaos"

A trade paperback, Rex Libris: I, Librarian (ISBN 9781593620622), was published in 2007, collecting the first five issues of the series along with an unpublished short story, “Rex versus the Red Baron!”. A second trade paperback, Rex Libris: Book of Monsters (ISBN 978-1-59362-153-7), was published in 2009 and collects the final eight issues of the series. In 2022, The Big Book of Rex Libris (ISBN 978-1-59362-315-9) was released as an omnibus edition collecting all stories from the original comic series. All three volumes were published by SLG Publishing.

== Series overview ==
The series follows the adventures of Rex Libris, the Head Librarian at the Middleton Public Library. Unbeknownst to the general public, Rex is actually over a thousand years old, and was the original librarian at the Library of Alexandria. He is a member of the Ordo Biblioteca, a secret international society of librarians. With the aid of the ancient god Thoth, who lives beneath the Library, Rex travels to the farthest reaches of the universe to collect late book fees, and to fight the powers of ignorance and darkness.

== Film adaptation ==
In April 2007, Warner Bros. announced that they had hired Mark Burton to write the script for a film adaptation of Rex Libris. The producer of the film is Mosaic Media. In 2012, Walden Media acquired the rights and hired Ben Zazove to write the script.
