= James Turner (illustrator) =

Canadian illustrator, comic book writer, and artist

- Born: James Turner
- Areas: Writer, Penciller
- Notable works: Rex Libris

James Turner is a Canadian illustrator, comic book writer, and artist. He wrote the series Rex Libris for the Slave Labor Graphics (SLG) Publishing Company. The comic ran between 2005 and 2008, for a total of 13 issues. His most recent graphic novel, "Warlord of Io', is about a spoiled rich kid who inherits a planet.

== Bibliography ==
- Rex Libris, Slave Labor Graphics
- Rex Libris Volume 1: I, Librarian, collects issues #1-5, Slave Labor Graphics, June 2007, ISBN 978-1-59362-062-2
- Rex Libris Volume 2: Book of Monsters, collects issues #6-13, Slave Labor Graphics, June 2009, ISBN 978-1-59362-153-7
- Nil: A Land Beyond Belief, Slave Labor Graphics, April 2005, ISBN 978-1-59362-020-2
- Warlord of Io, Slave Labor Graphics, July 2010, ISBN 978-1-59362-195-7

== Exhibitions ==
- Artscape "For-Art's-Sake" Show, Juried Exhibition, 2002
- Toronto Outdoor Art Show, Juried Exhibition, 2002
- Tectonica Solo Show, Reactor Art and Design Gallery, Winter 2001
