= The Clarence Principle =

Comic written by Fehed Said and drawn by Shari Chankhamma

The Clarence Principle is a black-and-white manga-inspired comic written by Fehed Said and drawn by Shari Chankhamma. It is about a boy named Clarence, who, just committing suicide, wakes up in an unconventional afterlife. The comic features black humor and light drama. It was published by Slave Labor Graphics in May 2007.

== Overview ==
The start of the novel is a dream told from the point of view of Clarence. The dream consists of him telling about his once lover Elissa offering to bring him somewhere with his friends. Clarence, however, must tie his shoes and is left behind. Clarence then wakes up to see he is in his home bath dead. He sees a strange message on his mirror that reads, "find me," then goes over to a nearby door and enters the realm of death.

When he enters, he is told by a gatekeeper that unless he can prove that he is dead he must return to where he came from. Clarence then attempts to confirm his passing by bashing his head with a stone but is stopped by the gatekeeper who tells him, "Don't you know that the dead can die?" which throws Clarence. He then bashes the gatekeeper with the same stone and runs past the gate.

As Clarence searches the realm of death (which resembles a Tropical Rainforest) Clarence stumbles upon a man hanging from a crescent moon he asks the man for directions but he refuses. The hanged moon man says he has been hanging from the moon trying to kill himself for 236 years. Clarence then makes a deal with him that if he finds out a way for the dead to die he give him directions in return. The man agrees and Clarence sets out to find a way for the dead to die.

== Characters ==
- Clarence: The protagonist of the story. Clarence takes his own life after some misfortunate events. He wakes up to realization that he is now in a world of the dead. Clarence must search the realm of the dead for the answer to the question "How the dead can die"
- Elissa: Clarence's old lover, she is the reason that Clarence committed suicide. She does not show up often in the book but is the final obstacle for Clarence to find peace in the realm of the dead.
- Blossom: A young spirit that resembles Elissa, Clarence encounters her on a stage with a pitch black audience. She and Clarence put on a play that is entitled "The Clarence Principle" Their confrontation on stage is similar to Clarence and Elissa's conversation in the stories climax.
- Death: A strange dark skinned man that keeps record of all the new souls that arrive into the realm of the dead. He tells Clarence that people who commit suicide can not enter the realm of the dead and that his presence is poisoning the other spirits.
- The Man in the Moon: A strange man in a top hat and cloak who has been trying to kill himself for 236 years. He makes a deal with Clarence that if he can find a way for the dead to die he will give Clarence directions to get to his personal heaven.
- The Tailor: A spirit that helps Clarence after he has fallen off a cliff and tears his arm off. The tailor tells Clarence that he will give him a needle and spool of thread if he will give him the same arm back when he no longer needs it.
- The Judge: A small skeleton dressed like a Judge, he claims that Clarence has committed a crime that he never did. When Clarence asks him what he is guilty of the Judge hesitates and tells him to stop "stating the obvious" The Judge is also the one who gives Clarence the answer to the question "can the dead die?"
