= Mister Blank =

Comic book series

- The cover of Mister Blank: The Exhaustive Collection. Artwork by Christopher J. Hicks

Publication information
- Publisher: Amaze Ink (Slave Labor Graphics)
- Schedule: Quarterly
- Format: Standard
- Publication date: Jan. 1997 –May 2000
- No. of issues: 15
- Main character(s): Samuel M. Smith; Julie Wallace

Creative team
- Created by: Christopher J. Hicks
- Written by: Christopher J. Hicks
- Artist: Christopher J. Hicks

Collected editions
- Mister Blank: The Exhaustive Collection: ISBN 978-0943151250

Mister Blank is a comic book limited series by Christopher J. Hicks, published by Slave Labor Graphics (under their Amaze Ink imprint). Mister Blank was characterized by bold and fluid but minimal line quality, and a robust use of gray tones.

== Publication history ==
Mister Blank first appeared in January 1997, with issue #0. Issue #1 followed in February, 1997, and subsequent issues were published quarterly until issue #14, in May 2000, which concluded the story. In June 2000, the 15 issues were collected into a trade paperback Mister Blank, the Exhaustive Collection, which included some additional material.

=== Mister Blank issues ===
- #0 January 1997
- #1 February 1997
- #2 May 1997
- #3 August 1997
- #4 November 1997
- #5 February 1998
- #6 May 1998
- #7 August 1998
- #8 November 1998
- #9 February 1999
- #10 May 1999
- #11 August 1999
- #12 November 1999
- #13 February 2000
- #14 May 2000
- Mister Blank: The Exhaustive Collection June 2000

== Characters ==
=== Samuel M. Smith ===
Sam Smith is the hero and archetypal everyman of the series. He is in all ways portrayed as an average working-class man, right down to a medium gray suit. To further emphasize his banality, his face is almost devoid of features, similar to the pop culture smiley.

Lacking in any powers or special skills, Smith's greatest asset is his shaky courage and moral fiber. While attempting to prevent suspected terrorists from blowing up his workplace, he becomes embroiled against his will in a global conspiracy. The escalating series of events also draws in his co-worker and love interest, Julie Wallace.

Smith's driving motivation is the protection of innocents, including Julie Wallace and his pet dog, What.

=== Julie Wallace ===
Julie joins Sam in his adventure, demonstrating more brazen courage. Also lacking powers, she is an everywoman to match Sam's everyman. Due partially to Smith's behavior, Julie becomes briefly involved with industrialist Charles Locke.

=== Charles Locke ===
Industrialist and antagonist, Locke is a senior member of a secret society known as the Brotherhood. Locke is involved in a secret war with fringe inventor Doctor Ixcel. Locke is a charming and adroit strategist, as well as the CEO of N Industries, a military developer and front for the Brotherhood. He is also an above-average martial artist. Locke is missing his right eye, and sometimes wears a prosthetic.

It is later revealed that Charles Locke is immortal, nearly 2100 years old. In his lifetime he has been a Roman senator, a Viking adventurer who inspired the myths of Odin and an 18th-century pirate.

=== Doctor Ixcel ===
Doctor Ixcel is an underground scientist and inventor, specializing in robotics. Although technically brilliant, Ixcel suffers from paranoia, mood swings and a peculiar speech impediment. Some of these problems can be linked back to his estranged twin brother, Wuxol.

Ixcel is involved in a secret war against Charles Locke and N Industries. The war is later discovered to be a diversion, as Locke and Ixcel are fellow members of the Brotherhood. Doctor Ixcel is an immortal, over 1200 years old. Although almost all of his life has been devoted to science, he has struggled in the shadow of his brother, Wuxol.

Operating from a cloaked airstrip, Ixcel's arsenal includes a giant robot gorilla named Dum Dum, a rocket biplane and an army of black-garbed androids called Incogs. The two Incogs, Regent and Bogart, act as Ixcel's chief agents.

==== Bogart ====
The Incog prototype Bogart was actually created by Doctor Ixcel's twin brother Wuxol. Bogart is an android with a self-sustaining power core and a layer of plastic "skin". As Doctor Ixcel created more and more Incogs, he stripped Bogart of his plastic skin. Each Incog was given a small piece of plastic skin around the eyes and nose, to give the illusion of humanity. Bogart eventually reclaimed all of his original skin, including the piece given to Regent after the destruction of all of the Incogs. Doctor Ixcel and Doctor Wuxol used Regent to overcome a temporal displacement, burying him in the earth thousands of years in the past.

Bogart is a fully autonomous machine, self-aware, intelligent and possessing his own unique personality. He is known for being bitter, sardonic and vengeful, especially against Sam Smith.

==== Regent ====
As Bogart was the first of the Incog series, Regent was the last. Doctor Ixcel made improvements in the Incog design with Regent, giving him awareness and limited control over other electronic devices and computers, via a dish wired into his hat. As with all the other Incogs (except Bogart), Regent was hired-wired with the agenda to battle Doctor Ixcel's enemies, most notably the N Corporation. Regent was partially destroyed by the rival android Sam UL, and later rebuilt. He later destroyed himself by overloading his power core, in a failed effort to destroy those he perceived as Ixcel's oppressors.

While Regent is as intelligent as Bogart, he is considerably more balanced mentally, and has a more stoic, subdued personality.

=== The Clone ===
Doctor Ixcel's mad designs against Locke led him to overestimate Sam Smith's importance, and eventually to cloning Sam Smith. The clone was created from biomass, a gooey self-reorganizing substance created by Doctor Ixcel. Although a very accurate copy, after being "murdered" and reformed, mutations occurred, as well as the manifestation of superhuman abilities such as increased strength and limited shape-shifting.

Ixcel's cloning process was so accurate that the Clone possessed much of the original Smith's thoughts and memories, and actually believed himself to be the original. However, Ixcel programmed into the clone a deep-seated loathing of N Industries and Charlies Locke.

=== The Mime ===
Once an ordinary street performer, the Mime was mutated by Ixcel's biomass. The biomass imprinted on her Ixcel's trademark hatred of Locke and also unlocked a host of powers in the young girl, styled after her mime persona. Some of abilities included invisibility/camouflage, mind reading, the creation of invisible fields or "boxes", and the creation of powerful winds.

The Mime appeared mute to all save the Clone, who could "hear" her due to their biomass connection.

=== Rudy Valentine ===
Valentine, a senior member of the brotherhood, is described as a world-renowned weapons broker and long-time friend of Charles Locke. Canonically, Valentine is over 2000 years old and has lived as a Jewish rebel, a Gaul, a Viking, a ronin, a founding member of the Templars and a Freemason.

=== Usser Hazhet ===
Member and enforcer of the Brotherhood, Usser travels the world in his airship, the Rex Mundi, disciplining Brothers who stray from the flock. His nearly 800 years of life have been spent attempting to cloud and enslave the human mind, through such means as magic, hypnotism, psychology, drugs and torture. He travels with an entourage of mentally enslaved bodyguards.

Usser's moral flexibility is gilded by his biting wit and effeminate charm.

=== King Whirlwind ===
Unwilling servant of Charles Locke, King Whirlwind possesses an uncanny command of the air itself. The towering Russian is grim and bitter, but is always honor-bound by his word. He owes his powers to being a Hevishtep, or half-breed. He is the son of a Cossack woman and the demon Pazuzu.

The character of King Whirlwind was inspired by a Russian folktale.

=== Heretic ===
The youngest member of the Brotherhood to appear in this series, Heretic is only around 400 years old. However, he possesses immense psychokinetic powers and abilities, from rupturing small blood vessels in a victim's brain to powerful shock waves. Heretic is known for his childish ego and dangerous temper tantrums.

Since he demonstrated his peculiar talents at such a young age, Usser Hazhet implanted Heretic with a hypnotic failsafe, that would leave him in a catatonic state. The trigger phrase, "Why don't you pass the time by playing a little solitaire?", is a reference to the film The Manchurian Candidate.

=== Lilith ===
The original bride of Adam in the Garden of Eden and the central figure of the Brotherhood. She is a towering figure, over 7 feet tall, with smooth blue skin, bright red hair and sharp, almost alien features. She is completely impervious to any Earthly harm, can heal and soothe with a kiss, and possesses a nearly boundless intellect. She also knows the feminine half of the ineffable Word of God. It has been suggested that Lilith is an amoral creature, since she never ate of the Tree of Knowledge of Good and Evil.

By Lilith's own account, she fled the Garden of Eden over irreconcilable differences with Adam, but not before witnessing the Word of God (possibly as Lucifer was expelled from Heaven). Adam and Lilith represented the image of God, halved into masculine and feminine sides. Therefore, when Lilith witnesses the Word of God, she could only hear the feminine side of it. She later invoked it to escape the Garden of Eden.

Lilith claimed that God sent angels to murder her. Although they failed in that task, they did damage her womb, so that Lilith could conceive only sons. However, she was already pregnant with a daughter, Sophia, who still bears a scar from the attack.

Lilith takes her mates from the worthiest men in human society. It has been speculated that she cultivated patriarchal societies to make it easier for her to find suitable mates. What becomes of these men after Lilith is finished with them is unknown. Her interest in Sam Smith is most likely as a potential mate.

==== Lilith and the Brotherhood ====
As Lilith fled into the wilderness, Adam and his new bride Eve were cast out of Eden for their crime against God. They were made coarse and beast-like, stripped of the divine grace that Lilith still enjoyed.

Lilith began bearing sons fathered by the mortal sons of Adam. While these sons appeared normal, they too enjoyed certain genetic privileges. Sons of the Brotherhood aged normally until they reached the age their fathers were at the time of their conception. They would never age another day after that. The Sons require no sleep under normal conditions, and only minimal food and water. They are immune to all disease, and no creature on Earth would ever knowingly cause them harm, except one.

When Lilith sent her sons forth to conquer the nations of men, the nations of men fought back. They treated the Sons of Lilith as demons, and hunted them down. To prevent this genocide, Lilith went into hiding, sending her sons into the world of men in secret, to steer the course of humanity in her designs covertly.

=== Sophia ===
The only child born of the Garden of Eden. Although Sophia is many thousands of years old, she is emotionally a teenager. This is due in large part to her mother keeping Sophia prisoner for almost her entire life, possibly because Sophia is the only other living creature capable of pronouncing the Word of God. However, unlike her mother, Sophia's womb is unwounded and capable of producing sons as well as daughters. She has the potential to mother an entire new race of immortals.

It has been speculated that after Sophia escaped incarceration, she took Sam Smith as a lover.
