= Bombaby the Screen Goddess =

- The cover of Bombaby the Screen Goddess #1. Artwork by Antony Mazzotta.

Publication information
- Publisher: Amaze Ink (Slave Labor Graphics)
- First appearance: Bombaby the Screen Goddess #1 (Amaze Ink, 2003)
- Created by: Antony Mazzotta

In-story information
- Alter ego: Sangeeta Mukherjee
- Species: Human
- Place of origin: Earth
Bombaby the Screen Goddess
Publication information
- Schedule: Bimonthly
- Format: Limited series
- Publication date: Nov. 2003 – Mar. 2004
- No. of issues: 3
- Main character(s): Bombaby
Creative team
- Written by: Antony Mazzotta
- Artist(s): Antony Mazzotta
Collected editions
- Bombay the Screen Goddess: ISBN 978-1593620035

Bombaby the Screen Goddess is a fictional character published in a comic book of the same name created by Antony Mazzotta and published by Amaze Ink (Slave Labor Graphics). The character is based upon an avatar of the Hindu goddess Mumbadevi; the comic is inspired in equal parts by superhero stories and Bollywood.

== Plot summary ==
Sangeeta Mukherjee is the daughter of well-to-do, traditional parents, dealing with a bratty little sister and a possible arranged marriage, when an out-of-body experience reveals that she is not an ordinary young woman. Sangeeta is, in fact, the reincarnation of India's ancient protector, the Goddess of Mumbai. But how will Sangeeta use this newfound power? Sangeeta must defy traditional expectations to choose what kind of life she wants and discover her true self.

== See also ==
- Indian comics
