= Dan Vado =

Publisher

- Vado in 2026
- Born: September 9, 1959 (age 67)
- Areas: Writer, Editor, Publisher
- Awards: Inkpot Award (2007)

Dan Vado (born September 9, 1959) is an American comic book publisher and writer. Vado is the owner, president, and publisher of Slave Labor Graphics, better known as SLG Publishing. As writer he worked for DC Comics.

== Biography ==
Vado started Slave Labor (SLG) in 1986 and is still its lone owner. The books Vado initially chose to publish were done by his personal friends, many of them acquaintances from high school. Even after more than twenty years in the business, Vado continues to publish books he "genuinely like[s]" rather than what he thinks the market is looking for.

His writing credits include Barabbas (Mirage Studios), Batman: Legends of the Dark Knight (DC Comics), Bill The Clown (Slave Labor), Extreme Justice (DC), Haunted Mansion (Slave Labor), Hero Sandwich (Slave Labor), Justice League America (DC), and Universal Monsters: Dracula (Dark Horse Comics). He also founded the Alternative Press Expo, one of the first comics conventions dedicated to alternative comics and self-publishers.

Dan runs The Art Boutiki Music Hall in San Jose, voted as one of the top 35 jazz clubs in the USA by All About Jazz, and also does consulting for prospective comics publishers and creators.

=== Personal life ===
He is an amateur cook with a predilection for "beer can chicken." He lives in San Jose, California, is married, and is the father of two sons.

== Awards ==
Vado won an Inkpot Award in 2007.
