= Chumble Spuzz =

Comic book series by Ethan "Eef" Nicolle

Volume 1 - Kill the Devil

Chumble Spuzz is a comic book series created, written and illustrated by Ethan "Eef" Nicolle, and published by Slave Labor Graphics. The series started in January 2008 with the first volume entitled "Kill the Devil". The series name Chumble Spuzz originates from a nonsensical Calvin & Hobbes quote.

== Plot ==
Volume 1 - "Kill the Devil" When two idiots named Gunther and Klem enter a pig race at the local carnival, neither of them realize that the pig they've won is possessed by the Dark Lord Satan. They consult with Reverend Mofo, a foul-mouthed Southern Baptist preacher monkey who concludes that the only way to repair the possessed swine is to go straight to the source. Calling upon the help of the trigger happy General Woodchuck and his sidekick Kernel Corn Nut, the gang heads into hell to Kill the Devil.

Volume 2 - "Pigeon Man & Death Sings the Blues" Gunther and Klem return in two new tales from the warped and endearingly disturbed world of Chumble Spuzz. In their first adventure, Pigeon Man, Klem befriends a man who was raised by pigeons, but Gunther sells the pigeon man out to a local zoo for Feral Humans to buy himself a new robot. When Klem discovers that the zoo is only a cover for an illegal underground feral-human fighting operation, he'll do anything to rescue his new friend from the inhumane zoo's cruel death matches. Also included is the tale Death Sings the Blues, starring the Grim Reaper himself. After a conversation with Klem about his recently deceased pet sea monkey, Death realizes all of the pain and suffering he has caused the world through taking away life, and he can't bear the pain anymore, so he kills himself. When Death commits suicide, everything that has ever died begins to reanimate. Can Gunther and Klem stop the massive outbreak before the world expires from zombie overpopulation? With the help of Reverend Mofo, General Woodchuck, and Kernel Corn Nut, they'll try their damnedest.

== Reception ==
"Kill the Devil" has received numerous positive reviews highlighting Nicolle's good sense of humor as well as artistic talent. Wizard Magazine dubbed "Kill the Devil" as an "Indie Must-Read for 2008". The series was nominated for an Eisner Award for Best Humor Publication in 2009.

ComicMonsters.com states that "The comic world needs guys like Ethan Nicolle. This book is a blast!". Some reviewers, such as the Broken Frontier, have gone as far as saying "Chumble Spuzz is amazing. I don’t think anyone who's read it has walked away believing otherwise."

After reviewing the title, Project Fanboy interviewed the author, where in response to those who view his work as an attack on religion, he was quoted as saying,

"My book wasn't made to bash religion. I poke fun at it, sure, but that's because I think that religion is great source material for comedy, especially with the cultural dogmas each generation adds to it."

"...I am not saying that I think religion is a waste of time, as many people seem to think. I just think there's a lot to laugh at."

There has also been notable support from acclaimed comic-book artist Doug TenNapel. TenNapel provided the foreword for "Kill the Devil" where he speculates that character Reverend Mofo seems like sort of a sideways tribute to what he is a caricature of, which author Ethan Nicolle confirms in the ProjectFanboy.com interview mentioned above.
