= Audrey Kawasaki =

American painter

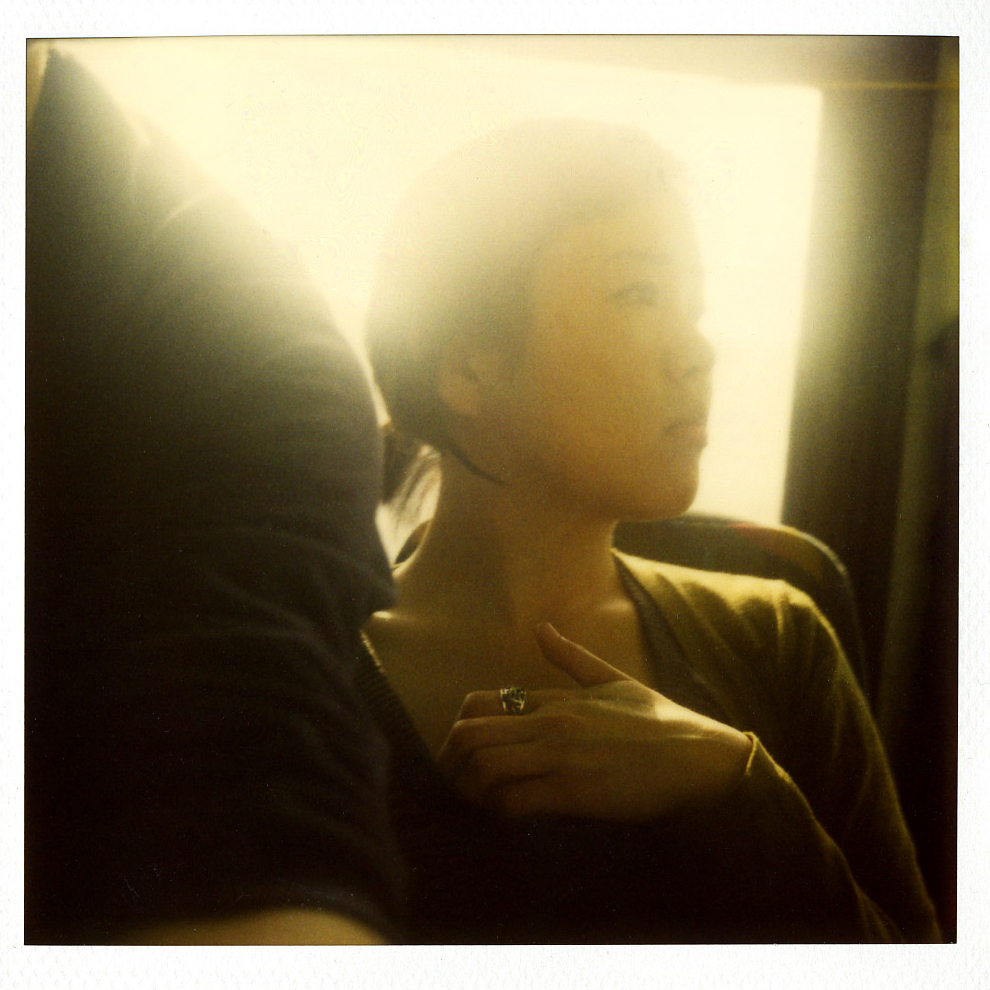
- Born: March 31, 1982 (age 43); Los Angeles, California, U.S.
- Education: Pratt Institute
- Known for: Painting

Audrey Kawasaki (born March 31, 1982) is a Los Angeles-based painter, known for her distinctive portrayals of young, adolescent women. Her works are oil paintings painted directly onto wood panels, and her style has been described as a fusion of Art Nouveau and Japanese manga, with primary influences like Gustav Klimt and Alphonse Mucha, saying “The merging of realistically molded faces and bodies against the contrast of flat lines and patterns is so stimulating to me.”

Kawasaki studied fine art painting for two years at the Pratt Institute in New York City, but left after two years without completing her degree. She has reported that several of her professors suggested that she should stay away from her particular style of painting nudes. She cites the emphasis in the New York art scene on conceptual art, an approach at odds with her figurative, illustrative style, as among the reasons she left. As of 2006, Kawasaki was considered a rising star in the Los Angeles art scene. In 2005, Kawasaki designed the cover art for Alice Smith's For Lovers, Dreamers & Me.

Oyasumi, 2006, oil & graphite on wood, representative of Kawasaki's most common medium.
