= World Ski and Snowboard Festival =

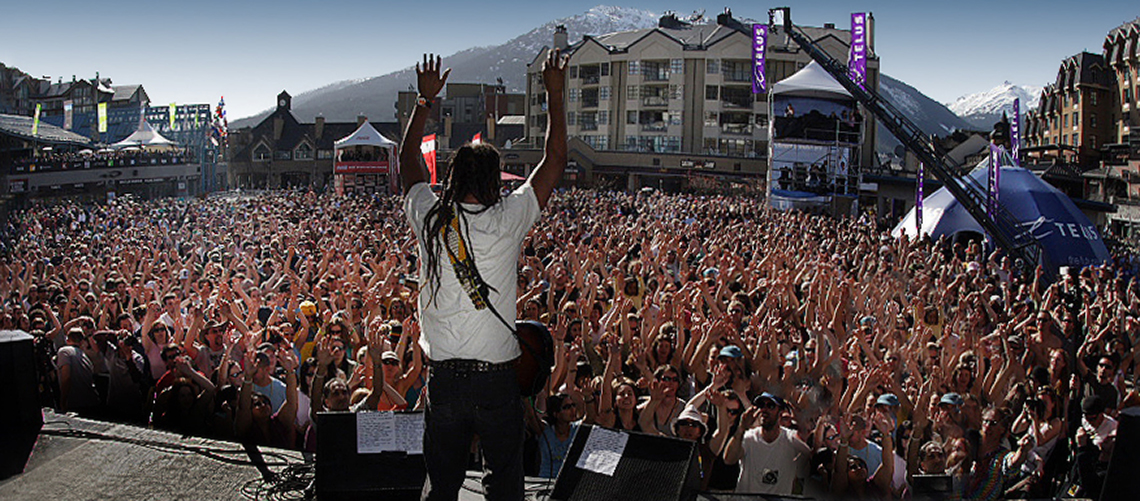
WSSF File Photo

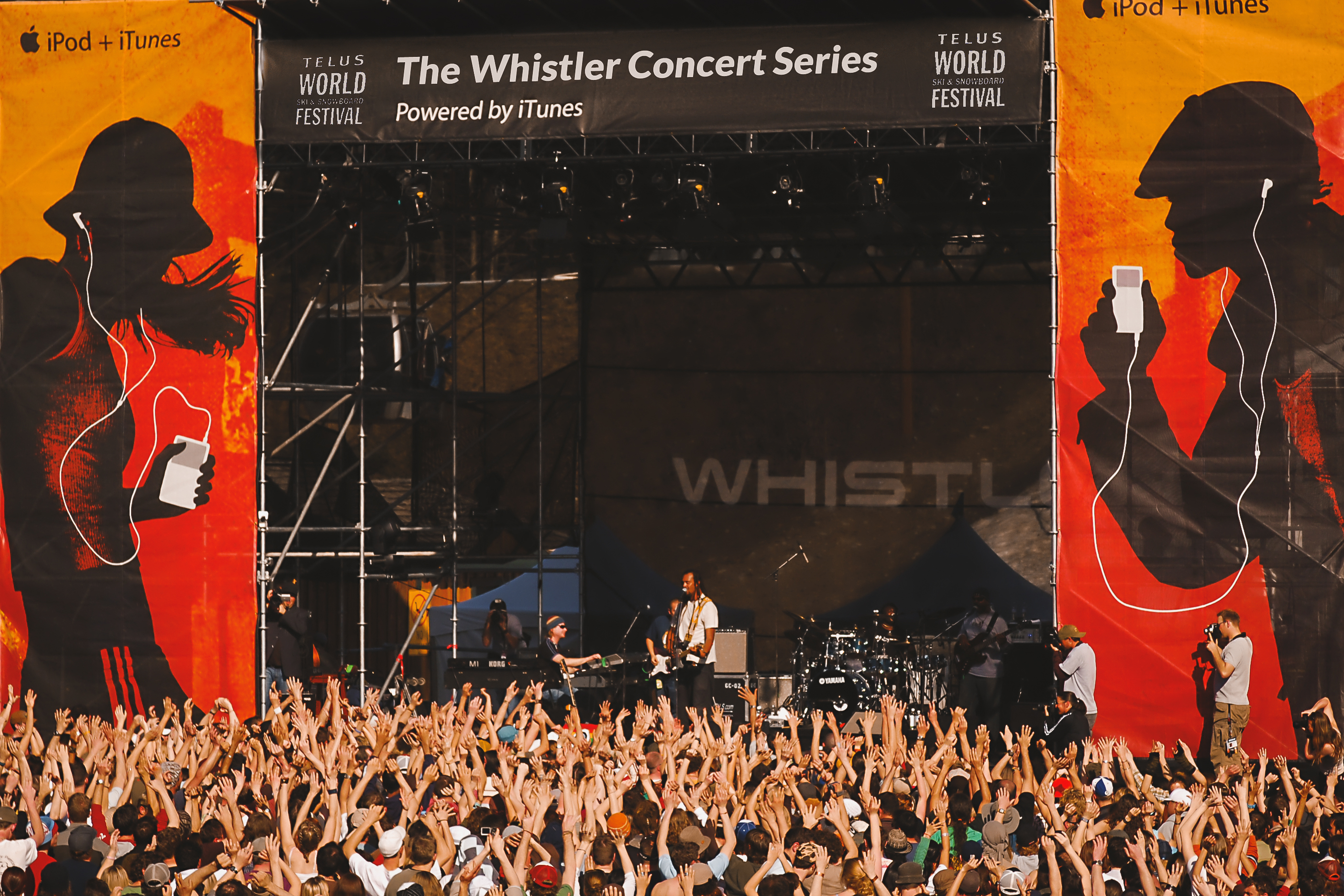
World Ski and Snowboard Festival iTunes Concert Series

The World Ski & Snowboard Festival (WSSF) was created by Doug Perry in 1996 as an annual celebration of snowsports, music, arts and mountain culture. The Festival is held each April in Whistler, British Columbia, Canada and has been recognized as the largest annual winter sports and music festival in North America. It has been called the snowsport industry's version of Burning Man.

The festival was developed in a partnership between its founder Perry, Tourism Whistler and Whistler/Blackcomb. The inaugural WSSF in 1996 consisted of 22 sports events and competitions. In subsequent years it underwent exponential growth in attendance and media coverage, resulting in Whistler becoming the busiest mountain resort in North America in the month of April. At its peak, annual attendance reached an estimated 250,000 resort visits and was televised in 122 countries.

An Economic Impact Assessment conducted during the 2006 event found that the WSSF generated $37.7 million in economic activity for the province of British Columbia, with visitor spending and operational expenditure injecting more than $15.7 million into the Whistler economy. Over 28,000 hotel room nights were sold during the Festival, with 86% being directly attributed to WSSF.

In 2006 the ownership of the festival was consolidated in a joint acquisition of Perry's ownership stake by Tourism Whistler and Whistler/Blackcomb.

The predecessor to WSSF was the World Technical Skiing Championships (WTSC). WTSC was created by Doug Perry as the world's first international freeskiing competition. The first event was staged on Blackcomb Mountain in April 1994 and was televised on ESPN in the United States and its international affiliates. WTSC was designed as a made-for-tv invitational event in which world champions, Olympians and skiing legends from the sport's major disciplines vied for the title of world's best all-mountain skier in a decathlon-format competition of freeskiing, GS racing, moguls and steeps down the Saudan Couloir. WTSC was modelled after Japan's largest skiing event, the All Japan Technical Skiing Championships, in which Perry competed as a member of Team Salomon.

The inaugural World Technical Skiing Championships was groundbreaking in that it drew over 100 media outlets to Whistler at a time when the resort was just beginning to emerge as an international destination. The media attention seeded the idea of developing a more diverse annual event with the potential to attract more top athletes, media and attendees to Whistler Resort.

The 1996 World Ski & Snowboard Festival included the 2nd World Technical Skiing Championships, World Masters Alpine Open, Westbeach Snowboard Classic, Whistler Cup, Couloir Extreme Race and a ski industry symposium. Subsequent festivals expanded to include the Whistler Concert Series, World Skiing Invitational, World Snowboarding Invitational, World Snowboarding Championship, Kokanee Boardercross, Salomon Skiercross, Pro Photographer Showdown, Filmmaker Showdown, Brave Art, State of the Art, Fashion Exposed, Multiplicity, Intersection and many others.

The World Ski & Snowboard Festival has included Canada's largest free outdoor concert series with 50 live acts per festival. Acts on the WSSF stage have included The Black Eyed Peas, Justin Timberlake, Nickelback, Michael Franti, Nas, Toots and the Maytals, and others.

From 2001 through 2006, the World Ski & Snowboard was televised as a four-part series on the Global Television Network and was syndicated to 122 countries.

In 2018, the World Ski & Snowboard Festival was acquired in full by Vail Resorts, Inc. upon its acquisition of Whistler Blackcomb. Vail Resorts announced WSSF would continue under new management, Crankworx Events Inc., in a shorter 6-day format, running April 10–15, 2018. Tourism Whistler relinquished its 22-year part ownership of the property. 2018 also marked the return of the Saudan Couloir Ski Race Extreme after a 20-year hiatus. In 2019, Vail Resorts, owner of Whistler Blackcomb, announced the World Ski & Snowboard Festival would be shortened to 5 days, running April 10–14.

In November 2019, the World Ski & Snowboard was acquired in full by Gibbons Whistler from Whistler Blackcomb. The 2020 and 2021 Festival were cancelled due to COVID-19, and returned with a scaled-down weekend format in 2022. In 2023, the Festival returned in a revised format.
