= Slave Labor Graphics =

American comic book publisher

- Founded: 1986; 40 years ago
- Founder: Dan Vado
- Country of origin: United States
- Headquarters location: San Jose, California
- Key people: Dan Vado, publisher Jennifer de Guzman, editor-in-chief
- Publication types: Comics
- Imprints: Amaze Ink
- Official website: slgpubs.com

Slave Labor Graphics (now mostly known by the acronym SLG) is an American independent comic book publisher, well known for publishing darkly humorous, offbeat adult comics. Creators associated with SLG over the years include Evan Dorkin, Roman Dirge, Sarah Dyer, Woodrow Phoenix, Jhonen Vasquez, and Andi Watson.

== Company history ==
Slave Labor Graphics was started in 1986 by Dan Vado, who remains the company's president and publisher.

The first book Slave Labor Graphics published was ShadowStar #3, a female superhero character previously published independently by some of Vado's friends. The company's first wave of titles (Samurai Penguin, Barrabas, Lee Flea, and The Light) were all written by Vado, with art by a variety of creators. Other early titles, such as Hero Sandwich and It's Science With Dr. Radium, were all created by friends of Vado's from high school.

Slave Labor Graphics's first major success was Samurai Penguin #1 by Vado and Mark Buck, which sold 58,000 copies in the summer of 1986. Other successes were Milk & Cheese, a comic about mean-spirited anthropomorphic dairy products by Evan Dorkin, and Johnny the Homicidal Maniac, a comic about the adventures of a serial killer by Jhonen Vasquez. In this time period, comic book speculation was rampant, so Slave Labor Graphics was able to sell its entire print run of many titles. However, at the end of the mid-1990s speculation bubble, some distributors went out of business without paying Slave Labor Graphics.

In 1995, Slave Labor Graphics added a more genre-oriented imprint called "Amaze Ink" intended to be for all audiences; the "stranger, more adult, and more difficult to categorize material" would still be published under the main "Slave Labor" imprint.

In 2005, Slave Labor Graphics entered into a partnership with The Walt Disney Company to produce comic book series based on some of its properties: Haunted Mansion, Wonderland, Tron, and Gargoyles. Its own creations, such as Little Gloomy (1999–2005), Kid Gravity (2003–2007), and The Super Scary Monster Show: Featuring Little Gloomy (2005–2007), appeared regularly in Disney Adventures magazine.

In September 2008, SLG remodeled its lobby to be a smaller gallery/shop which opened as Boutiki in San Jose in December 2008. The gallery/shop is still operating (with name of Art Boutiki) as of 2014 December.Art Boutiki in San Jose has since closed as of March, 2026.

In late 2010, Slave Labor Graphics established an independent record label entitled Slab Yard Sound Company.

In January 2012, editor-in-chief Jennifer de Guzman, who had been with the company since 2001, left to become the PR and Marketing Director at Image Comics.

== Titles ==
- Absent Friends (2004)
- A Bag of Anteaters
- A Lot of Love (by Geoff Watson and John Gebbia, 2002)
- Action Girl Comics #1–19 (by Sarah Dyer, 1994–2001)
- Adora Gone and The Electric Electric Elephant (2010)
- Awkward (by Ariel Schrag, 1999)
- Autumn #1–5 (2004–2006)
- Babyhead Magazine #1 (2004)
- Babysitter
- Bad Art Collection
- Barrabas #1–2 (1986)
- Bear #1–10 (by Jamie Smart, 2004–2005)
- Beer and Roaming in Las Vegas
- Bill The Clown 3 issues (1992–1993)
- Bloody Dreadful (by Justin Bastard Sane)
- Black Heart Billy
- Bombaby Screen Goddess #1–3 plus a TPB (by Antony Mazzotta, 2003–2004)
- Byron: Mad, Bad, and Dangerous (by Karl Christian Krumpholz, 2007)
- Caffeine #1–10 (by Jim Hill; April 1996 – 1999)
- Camping with Bigfoot
- Captain Dingleberry
- The Cat With The Really Big Head
- Cemetarians 6 issues (2008)
- Charm School #1–9 (by Elizabeth Watasin; Apr. 2000 – 2003)
- Chumble Spuzz (by Ethan Nicolle, 2008)
- The Clarence Principle (by Fehed Said and Shari Chankhamma, 2007)
- Cocopiazo
- The Comical Tragedy of Punch and Judy
- Comic Book Heaven
- Corporate Ninja (2005)
- Dead Eyes Open (by Matt Shepherd and Roy Boney, 2005)
- Definition
- Dim Witted Darryl
- Dork #1–11 (by Evan Dorkin, 1993–2006; continued by Dark Horse Comics)
- Dr. Grave (by Ed Clayton
- Dystopik Snomen (by Don M. Haring, Jr., 1995)
- Eating Steve: A Love Story
- Egg Story
- Elmer
- Emily and the Intergalactic Lemonade Stand
- Emo Boy #1–11 (by Steve Emond, 2005–2007)
- Empty Love Stories #1–2 (all stories written by Steve Darnall, Nov. 1994 – Aug. 1996)
- Evenfall (by Pete Stathis, 2004)
- Everwinds
- Everything Can Be Beaten
- Farewell Georgia
- Fishmasters
- Gargoyles 15 issues (by Greg Weisman, et al; a continuation of the TV series)
- Ghost Ship #1–3 (by Jon Lewis, Mar. 1996 – Oct. 1996)
- Ghouly Boys
- Gloomcookie #1–28 (by Serena Valentino and Vincent Batignole, 1999–2006)
- The Griffin (by Dan Vado)
- Halo and Sprocket #1–4 (2002)
- Haunted Mansion
- Heart of a Corpse (by Justin Bastard Sane)
- Hectic Planet (by Evan Dorkin; previously known as Pirate Corp$)
- Hero Sandwich #1–5 (1987–1989)
- Highway 13 #1–10 (by Les McClaine, 2001–2003)
- Hummingbird
- Hsu and Chan (by Jeremy "Norm" Scott)
- I Feel Sick #1–2 (by Jhonen Vasquez, 1999–2000)
- Imp
- Iliad #1–2
- It's Science With Doctor Radium (1986)
- Java Town #1–4
- Jellyfist (by Jhonen Vasquez and Jenny Goldberg)
- Jet Comics #1–3
- Jet Pack Pets
- Johnny the Homicidal Maniac #1–7 (by Jhonen Vasquez, 1995–1997)
- Kitsune Tales #1 (by Woodrow Phoenix and Andi Watson, 2003)
- Knights of the Living Dead
- Lenore #1–13 (by Roman Dirge, 1998–2007)
- Life of a Fetus #1–7
- Likewise #1–2 (by Ariel Schrag, 2002)
- Little Gloomy #1–6 (by Landry Walker and Eric Jones, 1999)
- Little Gloomy Adventures one-shot (2003)
- Little Gloomy Crypt of Creepts one-shot (2004)
- Little Gloomy Hallowe'en Special one-shot
- Little Scrowlie 18 issues (by Jennifer Feinberg and Todd Meister; Mar. 2003 – Jan. 2008)
- Longshot Comics, Shanne Simmons (volume 1: 1995. volume 2: 1997)
- Love In Tights
- Metamorphosis Odyssey (by Jim Starlin)
- Midnight Sun
- Milk & Cheese 7 issues plus a TPB (by Evan Dorkin, 1991–2000)
- Mister Blank 15 issues (by Christopher J. Hicks, 1996–1998)
- Model A
- The Monsters In My Tummy
- Mr. Night
- Murder Can Be Fun #1–12 (anthology; 1996–1999)
- MuZz
- My Monkey's Name is Jennifer (2002)
- Next Exit #1–10 (by Christy Lijewski; 2004 – 2006)
- Nightmares & Fairy Tales #1–23 (by Serena Valentino and Camilla D'Errico, May 2002 – May 2008)
- Nil: A Land Beyond Belief original graphic novel (by James Turner, 2005)
- No Hope
- Oblivion City
- Oddjob #1–8 (by Ian Smith and Tyson Smith, Spring 1999 – May 2001)
- On the Bus
- One Fisted Tales #1–11 (anthology, 1990 – Aug. 1994)
- Outlook:Grim #1–6 (2003–2004)
- The Pants Ant Trouser Hour
- Paris (by Andi Watson, 2005–2006)
- Patty Cake 33 issues (by Scott Roberts; 1997–2005)
- Pinocchio: Vampire Slayer
- Pirate Club #1–10 (by Derek Hunter & Elias Pate, 2004–2006)
- Pirate Corp$ (by Evan Dorkin, 1989–1993)
- The Price
- Private Beach #1–7? (2002?)
- Punk Rock & Trailer Parks (2008)
- The Replacement God #1–8 (by Zander Cannon, June 1995–1997)
- Rex Libris #1–13 (by James Turner, 2005–2008)
- Rogue Satellite Comics #1–3 (Reilly & Atkinson, 1996–1997)
- The Royal Historian of Oz
- Samurai Jam #3–4 (by Andi Watson, 1993, previously Samurai Funnies, published by Solson Publications)
- Samurai Penguin #1–8 (1986–1988)
- Samurai Penguin: Food Chain Follies #1
- Sanctuary
- Screenplay #1
- Screwtooth #1-? (2006)
- Serenity Rose #1–5 (by Aaron Alexovich, 2003–2004)
- Seth Throb, Underground Artist
- Shadoweyes (by Sophie Campbell, 2010)
- ShadowStar #3 (1986; #1–2 published by Savage Graphics)
- Sidney Mellon's Thunderskull!
- The Sister's Luck (by Shari Chankhamma, 2010)
- Skaggy The Lost #1–4, trade paperback
- Skeleton Girl Comics #1–3
- Skeleton Key #1–30 (by Andi Watson, July 1995 – Jan. 1998 )
- Sky Ape #1–4
- Slacker Comics #1–18 (by Doug Slack, Aug. 1994 – Oct. 1998)
- Slow News Day (by Andi Watson, 2001)
- Street Angel #1–5 (by Jim Rugg, 2004–2005)
- Sparks
- Squee #1–4 (by Jhonen Vasquez, 1997–1998)
- Strongman by Charles Soule
- Suburban High Life #1-3 (1987), Volume 2 #1 (1988)
- Sugar Buzz #1–9 (by Ian Carney and Woodrow Phoenix, Jan. 1998 – May 2002)
- Swerve #1–2 (by "Downer" creator Kyle S. Hunter)
- The Jam #2–6, 1989–1990 (by Bernie Mireault; came from Matrix Graphics, moved to Dark Horse Comics)
- The Super Scary Monster Show: Featuring Little Gloomy
- Tales from the Heart #3–11, 1988 – May 1994 (by Cindy Goff, Rafael Nieves and Seitu Hayden; came from Entropy Enterprises)
- Tron: The Ghost in the Machine (2006–2008; miniseries following up the film and the video game TRON 2.0)
- The Trouble With Igor #1 (2006)
- True Swamp #4–5 (by Jon Lewis, Oct. 1994 – Feb. 1995); first 3 issues published by Peristaltic Press
- Truth Serum
- Ubu Bubu #1–4 (2008–2009)
- Ursa Minors #1-? (2006)
- Vaistron #1–5 (2005)
- The Vesha Valentine Story (by Des Taylor, 2011)
- The Waiting Place 18 issues (by Sean McKeever, Mike Norton, and David Yurkovich; Apr. – Sept. 1997; Nov. 1999 – Feb. 2002)
- Weird Science (1986)
- Where's It At, Sugar Kat? #1–3 (by Woodrow Phoenix and Ian Carney, Sept. 2000 – Mar. 2001)
- Whistles (by Andrew Hussie, 2007)
- Wonderland
- Zombies Calling (by Faith Erin Hicks, 2007)
