= Oddjob (comics) =

Publication information
- Publisher: Slave Labor Graphics
- Schedule: Bimonthly
- Format: Standard
- Publication date: Spring 1999 - May 2001
- No. of issues: 8
- Main character(s): Moe, Investigator of the Odd

Creative team
- Created by: Ian Smith and Tyson Smith
- Written by: Ian Smith
- Artist: Tyson Smith

Collected editions
- Oddjob: The Collected Stories, Vol. 1: ISBN 978-0943151632

Oddjob is a comic book series published by Slave Labor Graphics and created by Ian Smith and Tyson Smith, featuring Moe, Investigator of the Odd. The comic is an action/humor series with absurdist tendencies. Oddjob was published in bimonthly from Spring 1999-May 2001. All eight issues (and an additional story) were collected in a trade paperback by Slave Labor in 2003.

== Characters ==
Moe is assisted by the failed clown Robin and a former baseball player Moose Mulligan, who owns the bar The Spittoon (the base of their operation). Some of their adversaries include Amish cyborg, sloths and living gummi men.
