= Serena Valentino =

American comics writer (1970-)

Serena Valentino (born 1970) is an American comic book writer, author, and storyteller. She created the comic book series Gloomcookie and Nightmares & Fairy Tales. She also authored the Villain novels published by Disney Press, which have earned Valentino critical acclaim for her style of storytelling.

== Career ==
Serena Valentino has published ten Villains novels. The first, The Fairest of All: A Tale of the Wicked Queen, was based on the Evil Queen from Snow White and the Seven Dwarfs and released on August 18, 2009. The second novel, The Beast Within: A Tale of Beauty's Prince, based on the character of Beast from Beauty and the Beast, was released on July 22, 2014. This was followed by Poor Unfortunate Soul: A Tale of the Sea Witch, which is based on Ursula the Sea Witch, the villainess from The Little Mermaid. This third book in the series was released on July 26, 2016.

The fourth novel, Mistress of All Evil: A Tale of the Dark Fairy, written from the point of view of Maleficent from Sleeping Beauty, was released on October 3, 2017.

The fifth novel, Mother Knows Best: A Tale of the Old Witch, based on Mother Gothel, the villainess from Tangled, was released on August 7, 2018. The release date for the sixth book, The Odd Sisters: A Villains Novel, was July 2, 2019. Valentino released her seventh novel, Evil Thing, on July 7, 2020, and is told in the first person from the viewpoint of Cruella De Vil. Valentino released the eighth novel, Cold Hearted, detailing the backstory of Lady Tremaine, on June 29, 2021. The ninth novel, released on July 19, 2022, featured the first male villain of the series, Captain Hook. Announced via Facebook, Valentino has been contracted with Disney Press to write three more volumes of the Villains series after the ninth volume, bringing the total number to twelve.

In 2019, it was reported that her Villains series was being adapted into the television series Book Of Enchantment. With showrunner Michael Seitzman developing it, Disney had writers working on the script for 13 weeks, before cancelling the series in late August 2019 before the debut of Disney+. Disney maintained the TV rights to the franchise. The cancellation was over concerns it was "too dark" for the new streaming service, and a fear that children under age would view it.

== Publishing history ==
=== GloomCookie series (Comic books) ===
- GloomCookie (January 26, 2001)
- GloomCookie, Volume 2 (July 3, 2002)
- Broken Curses (April 1, 2004)
- The Carnival Wars (November 1, 2005)
- The Final Curtain (April 3, 2007)

Companion comic book

- A Monster's Christmas (January 1, 2002)

=== Nightmares & Fairy Tales series (Comic books) ===
- Once Upon a Time (April 14, 2004)
- Beautiful Beasts (July 6, 2005)
- 1140 Rue Royale (April 18, 2007)
- Dancing With the Ghosts of Whales (July 29, 2008)

=== Disney Villains series (Novels) ===
- Fairest of All: A Tale of the Wicked Queen (August 18, 2009)
- The Beast Within: A Tale of Beauty's Prince (July 22, 2014)
- Poor Unfortunate Soul: A Tale of the Sea Witch (July 26, 2016)
- Mistress of All Evil: A Tale of the Dark Fairy (October 3, 2017)
- Mother Knows Best: A Tale of the Old Witch (August 7, 2018)
- The Odd Sisters: A Tale of the Three Witches (July 2, 2019)
- Evil Thing: A Tale of That De Vil Woman (July 7, 2020)
- Cold Hearted: A Tale of the Wicked Stepmother (July 6, 2021)
- Never Never: A Tale of Captain Hook (July 19, 2022)
- Fire & Fate: A Tale of the Lord of Darkness (July 18, 2023)
- Kill the Beast: A Tale of Everyone's Favorite Guy (July 30, 2024)
- Heartbroken: A Tale of the Angry Queen (July 29, 2025)
- Call of the Dead: A Tale of Two Demons (July 20, 2027)

=== Stand-alone novels ===
- Raising the Horseman (September 6, 2022)
