= John Fardell =

Cartoonist

- Born: John Fardell; 1967 (age 58–59)
- Occupations: author & children's book illustrator
- Writing career
- Language: English

John Fardell (born 1967) is an English cartoonist, and author and illustrator of children's books.

== Work ==
Fardell has been a regular contributor to the adult comic Viz, and has created and drawn two of the most popular and long-running strips, The Modern Parents and The Critics, and also Ferdinand the Foodie and Desert Island Teacher. His strip The Modern Parents portrays the way a mother and father insist on bringing up their young sons by following a doctrine they term "ethical awareness", much to the children's detriment. He also contributed illustrations and comic strips to 1990s video game magazine Electric Brain.

Fardell is also an author and illustrator of children's books. To date he has produced three children's adventure novels: The Seven Professors of the Far North (2004), The Flight of the Silver Turtle (2006), and The Secret of the Black Moon Moth (2009) – and three children's picture books: Manfred the Baddie (2008), Jeremiah Jellyfish Flies High (2010), and The Day Louis Got Eaten (2011).

His picture book The Day Louis Got Eaten! won the younger category of the Scottish Children's Book Award in 2012.
