= List of Viz comic strips =

The following is a list of recurring or notable one-off strips from the British adult spoof comic magazine Viz. This list is by no means complete as with each issue new characters/strips/stories are introduced.

== A–E ==
- Abel Unstable – A man convinced he will suddenly catch fire at any moment, but never does. The strip often ends with someone else spontaneously combusting or exploding, leading Abel to grumble and remark "lucky sod" or similar.
- Acker Bilk – See Jimmy Hill.
- Abraham Lincoln – A strip about the 16th president of the USA feeling so envious about Isambard Brunel having a taller hat than him.
- Abraham Linked-in – A strip about Abraham Lincoln constantly getting messages on his smartphone from the app LinkedIn.
- Adam and the Aunts – Adam Ant receives help from his four elderly aunts.
- Afternoon tea with Mr Kiplin – About Mr Kiplin (a parody of cake manufacturer Mr Kipling) inviting someone over for tea but because he eats so much cake, he eventually vomits for the whole night.
- Aladdin and his Magic Tramp – A parody of Aladdin with a homeless person instead of a genie.
- Albert Einstein – About Albert Einstein and the antics of his three nephews, Hughlich, Dewlich and Loulich (a parody of Huey, Duey and Louie from Walt Disney's Ducktales).
- Albert Gordon – Traffic Warden – A strip from the Big Hard Number Two annual about a corrupt traffic warden who assaults members of the public and gives them fines for the most extraordinary reasons.
- Albert O' Balsam and his Magic Hat – A man who claims his hat has magic powers, but who annoys everyone he sees.
- Alcan Foil Wrapped Pork Stock Warrior – a young boy who becomes a "superhero" (in reality, completely useless) with the aid of tinfoil and pork stock.
- Aldridge Prior – a pathological liar whose lies are ludicrous, such as The Nolan Sisters living in his fridge or he is related to some very famous person. Prior is instantly recognizable for his unfashionable dress, usually a tartan jacket with a sheepskin collar and a pair of uncomfortable-looking platform shoes.
- Alexander Graham Bell-End – a crazy inventor who continually rubs his penis on things and then tricks his assistant into touching them with his hands or mouth, at which point Alexander laughs uproariously whilst exclaiming "I TOTALLY rubbed my bell-end on that!" A pun on Alexander Graham Bell.
- Amazing Air-Fryer Girl – a young woman who won't shut up about the fact she owns an air fryer.
- Amy Winemouse – a parody of Amy Winehouse portrayed as an alcoholic mouse.
- Anna and Her Alpine Horn – a story in the style of 1950s girls' comics, about a Swiss girl named Anna who loves playing her Alpine horn and is sent to live with cruel relatives in England after the death of her parents.
- Anna Reksik – a model who repeatedly vomits in order to keep her thin shape. Most strips involve Anna resorting to extreme lengths to lose weight (encouraged by her friend Belle Emia, a fellow model); only to unwittingly eat something (usually very small, such as a potato crisp) that causes her to instantly put on an unrealistically huge amount of weight. The strip attracted press controversy because of its portrayal of eating disorders and cocaine addiction.
- The Anti-Nowhere League of Greystone's School - a story in the style of 1950s-60s comics for girls, in which a girl at an exclusive boarding school smuggles The Anti-Nowhere League into the school as illicit pets.
- Archie McBlarter – Everyday Farting Dilemmas – A newer strip featuring a middle-aged and rather obese man who has almost permanent trouble with his guts (Not to be confused with Johnny Fartpants (which see)). He is his own worst enemy, as he loves the various types of food which cause extreme flatulence, such as scotch eggs, curries, beans, etc. (often referred to as 'musical food') Sometimes he comes to grief in the most extreme way, for example, he has a giant fart at the same time a bolt of lightning hits his house, and the fart explodes spectacularly, destroying the home and he ending up in hospital. The last frame has him ordering his breakfast – scotch eggs.
- Arse Farm – One-off strip about a farmer who cultivates human buttocks on his land.
- Arsehole Kate – One-off parody of Keyhole Kate in which Kate instead likes to look up people's bottoms.
- As If By Tragic – A parody of Mr Benn, in which the shopkeeper dies of a heart attack while Mr Benn is on the moon, leading to astronauts finding his body fifty-years later wondering how he got there.
- Auf Wiedersehen, Pet Detectives – A parody of Auf Wiedersehen, Pet in which the men moonlight as pet detectives and investigate a series of dognappings.
- Auntie Cockwise – An old lady who can tell the size of a man's penis just by looking at him, much to the amusement of her little nephew.
- Bad Bob, the Randy Wonder Dog – About a policeman who visits a retirement home on Christmas Day with his Jack Russell terrier Bad Bob, who proceeds to have sex with one of the resident's legs causing him to have a heart attack (with Bad Bob doing the same to the thigh of the matron who bends down to try and revive him).
- Bad Girl Ballet Borstal at the Bottom of the Sea – A girl is sent to an underwater borstal and forced to do ballet lessons all day. She discovers that the establishment is part of an elaborate scheme to send the borstal inmates to a zoo as food for tigers. The girl attempts to raise the alarm, but is trapped by the homicidal ghost of Rudolf Nureyev, with the strip abruptly ending on an explanation that had it continued she would have been miraculously rescued by police in a submarine.
- Badly Drawn Man – a poorly drawn character.
- Badly Overdrawn Boy – a parody of the pop singer Badly Drawn Boy, who is seen busking outside his local bank because he is broke (issue 126)
- Balsa Boy – a take on Pinocchio, in which a lonely old pensioner makes a "son" from balsa wood. While Balsa Boy does have dialogue, all the speech bubbles unambiguously emanate from the old man. The strip ends with the old man being sent to a mental institution after burning down the house while trying to dry off Balsa Boy in front of the fire, but by the last frame he is busy working on making another "boy" out of scones.
- Balthazar Sparrow and his Shit Christmas Gift Disposal Wheelbarrow – A one-off strip where the titular character collects unwanted Christmas presents on Boxing Day from people for £1 each and takes them to the local tip on his wheelbarrow, only to have to spend all the money he's earned on a disposal charge as since he's being paid to take it the rubbish is reclassified from 'domestic waste' to 'commercial waste'.
- Barbara Cartland's ... – Barbara Cartland pays a visit somewhere (such as a farmyard or barber salon) and ends up inadvertently foiling criminals.
- Barnaby Grudge - A successful businessman who always seems to hold resentment over the smallest thing on people even though it happened many years previously and most other people would have forgiven. A play on the Charles Dickens book Barnaby Rudge
- Barnaby's Spelling Bees – A strip about a boy called Barnaby Bixby who owns a swarm of African Killer Bees who can sting anyone if their owner says a word beginning with the second letter of the English alphabet.
- Barny the Complete Bastard – A strip featured in The Big Stiff One annual about some guy getting falsely accused of doing bad things for no reason.
- Barney Brimstone's Biscuit Tin Circus – a boy who owns a miniature circus inside a biscuit tin.
- Barry the Cat – a one-off parody of The Beano's acrobatic crimefighter Billy the Cat. Unlike his Beano equivalent, Barry is incompetent, hopelessly uncoordinated, and is immediately recognised despite his "cat-suit" disguise. The final panel shows him in hospital, suffering from multiple injuries, being told that he has acted "very foolishly".
- Barry Scott of the Antarctic - Cillit Bang representative Barry Scott crosses the Antarctic to help a group of explorers with their blocked drains. Upon discovering that Mr Muscle beat him to it, he goes outside alone in the cold saying he "may be some time."
- Bart Conrad – a store detective who takes his job far too seriously.
- Bassey Come Home – in which a young boy who lives on a farm has Shirley Bassey as a pet, and must fight to keep her from being sold when the farm falls on hard times.
- (Sir) Baxter Basics – An occasional strip featuring an extremely amoral, self-serving and sexually deviant right-wing Conservative (and later Labour) MP who first appeared at around the same time as John Major's Back to Basics campaign, and a transparent statement on the hypocrisy of politicians. Drawn by Simon Thorp.
- Becky Thump – a girl from the North of England who hates southerners so much she even assaults a supermarket delivery man for bringing her southern fried chicken. Is also shown reading a book entitled '1001 reasons to hate Southerners'. Her name is a parody of the Northern expletive 'Ecky-Thump!'.
- Beddley Wetterton – A strip about a man who attempts to wet his bed, but his various flatmates keep preventing him to do so.
- Beeny of the Lamp – An Aladdin parody in which Sarah Beeny comes out of a magic lamp to help a young couple wishing for advice on buying a property.
- Ben and the Space Walrus – a one-off strip centred on a fat kid named Ben who finds a SpaceWalrus and eats his dog Bunny. (001)
- Benny's Hedges – a one-off strip featuring a boy who walked round with two hedges on wheels, helping various members of society. This included a peeping tom who used the hedges to hide behind, and leer at passing ladies. Benny also created a "maze" to entertain two unruly children, one of which exclaimed "Tee-hee, help, I'm lost!" The name is a play on words of the cigarette brand Benson and Hedges.
- Bert Midler, Biddy-Fiddler – a pervert with a fetish for very elderly women. After he finally gets a date with a 92-year-old, he is disappointed to be told that she has died; only to cheer up again when he is invited to her funeral with all her friends of similar age.
- Bertie Blunt (His Parrot's A Cunt) – a boy who owns an extremely violent, foul-mouthed parrot that insults everyone and encourages him to commit suicide. When the parrot kills Bertie's grandmother, who leaves them all her money, Bertie fights back by spending his inheritance on a microwave oven which he then uses to cook the parrot alive. Chris Donald, creator of Viz, has said that in the early days of the magazine he would not permit the "c word" to be used, until an outside artist (Sean Agnew) sent him this strip which he found to be so good he decided to use it anyway.
- Bicycle Bellend – a man on a bicycle berating drivers for "showing him disrespect" even though he is actually the dangerous road user (often not looking and causing accidents, and at one point he rides the wrong way up a one-way street), getting his comeuppance when he tells off a burly driver who subsequently beats him up.
- Biffa Bacon – A very long-running icon of Viz, featuring Biffa (shortened from Bifferidge) and his family – Mutha and Fatha (real names Vermintrude (née Haystacks) and Billy or Basha Bacon) – hail from the Tyneside region of North East England and speak in the Geordie dialect. Biffa is constantly subjected to abuse by his parents – even being kicked in the groin by both of them. Biffa is a visual parody of the character Bully Beef from The Dandy. His mother, who is rough-looking and masculine, resembles Desperate Dan. The characters were allegedly inspired by a real family observed by Viz editor Chris Donald in Newcastle upon Tyne city centre, where the son began an unprovoked assault on another boy; the parents, rather than intervening, began shouting encouragement to their child. As soon as it appeared the victim of the assault was able to defend himself, the father joined in the attack, ceasing only when police officers intervened. Some characters who have extended the Bacon family include Biffa's new baby brother Basha and a dog called Knacka (a pun on Dennis The Menace's dog Gnasher and the slang word "knacker"), Biffa's uncle Dekka, Biffa's grandfather (on his father's side) who is bald, and also Biffa's grandma. Accasionally he comes into contact with his opposite number, Cedric Soft. This character's name speaks for itself!
- Big Fuckin' Dave – a big, burly and mentally unstable man with his name often tattooed across his forehead, sometimes back-to-front, who beats people up for being 'queeahs' because he believes they are drinking only a half-pint of beer, not drinking the full ten pints before having a slash or smoking less than full-strength cigarettes. Usually egged on by his much smaller, trouble-making (unnamed) friend ("Come on Dave – I just seen a guy in the lounge drinkin' halves!" "THE BLOODY QUEEAH!!"). Has been part of other strips, notably Sid the Sexist.
- Big Jobs – a one-off strip in which Steve Jobs unveils the iPoo, a portable toilet which he demonstrates by defecating and vomiting into it. It is revealed that the waste is sent to another dimension (rendered, unusually for Viz, in full colour) where it is eaten by the inhabitants who do not care where it comes from since it is free.
- Big John Holmes and the Hendersons – The Henderson family accidentally hit the famous adult star John Holmes with their car. Believing he is dead, they drive him home, intending to hide the body; but he turns out to still be alive. The children want Holmes to continue living with them, but after he repeatedly tries to seduce the mother in stereotypical porn fashion (such as disguising himself as a pizza delivery boy), the family agrees to drop him off on the set of a porn film. They think their troubles are over - only to run over Stormy Daniels on the way back.
- Big Vern – an East End gangster. Almost every strip follows the same story, in which Vern and his friend Ernie will begin an ordinary activity but with Vern convinced they are actually committing a criminal 'job', believing Ernie's protests that they are not is just a cover story. At some point, a person will make an innocent remark which makes Vern shoot the person in the head believing he is the police (while shouting something along the lines of "No bastard copper's gonna take me alive!" or "Get dahn, Ernie, he's going for his piece!") before then shooting Ernie (sometimes believing Ernie 'grassed' him up, while other times doing it to save him from prison) and occasionally others, and finally himself. The shootings are always shown in an extremely graphic fashion (blood, gore and goodness-knows what-else in every direction – but because the strip is in black-and-white much of the impact is lost!), but despite this both are always resurrected for the next issue. Vern's second name is Dakin, a reference to the notably violent 1971 British crime thriller Villain, whose anti-hero (played by Richard Burton) is named Vic Dakin.
- Biggles Smalls - the rapper Biggie Smalls becomes a heroic fighter pilot in WWII.
- Bill WeetaBixby – a one-off parody of The Incredible Hulk about Bill Bixby who turns into a violent piece of Weetabix when he' is confronted by muggers, only for them to promptly step on him.
- Billy Banana Head – An early strip about a man with said fruit for a head.
- Billy Bloater – an extremely fat and greedy schoolboy whose gut is so vast that it distorts gravity and pulls stray bank notes into his reach, allowing him to indulge in an 'all you can eat' feast which increases his density until he effectively becomes a black hole and the artist realises that he does not know how to complete the strip.
- Billy Bottom and his Zany Toilet Pranks – a literal toilet humour strip, based around a somewhat obese man and his attempts to defecate whilst various factors and circumstances conspire to prevent him from doing so. The first strip carried a spoof certificate of the type given to films by the BBFC, classifying the strip as "puerile". One of the latest has him as a caveman who is caught by the incoming Ice-Age, and is frozen solid for two million years. He is eventually freed by two archaeologists but the stink is so atrocious that he advises them 'I'd leave it for ten minutes if I were you!' Conceived by Tom Bambridge.
- Billy Bound (It's Always His Round) – a man whose friends constantly trick him into offering to buy the next round of drinks.
- Billy's Bollocks – A one off strip from The Big Hard Number 2 annual about a person called Billy Baxter who found a pair of large spherical fossils in a rubbish bin outside a natural history museum and uses them for a game of Conkers. He ends up throwing them into some man's car and gets ten pounds from him and then flies away using his balls as a helicopter to escape a bully.
- Billy Britain – a right-wing ultra-nationalist resembling Enoch Powell who appeared in two very early strips. Chris Donald considers him an early prototype of Major Misunderstanding. He also made a one-off reappearance in the September 2002 issue satirising the issue of asylum seekers, where after he spends the strip making several futile attempts to round up illegal immigrants, the local authorities turn his home into a detention centre for refugees.
- Billy Bumble Beard – A man who has a beard of bees, who consequently cannot attract ladies. The one lady he finally got off with was Marjorie Wasp-Fanny, but ended up with a large bandage on his private area for obvious reasons.
- Billy the Fish – A very long-running and iconic VIZ strip featuring Billy who is half man, half fish, he is a star footballer despite being drawn with no legs (he does apparently own a pair of football boots, but it is not clear why). The strip is a satire of, or homage to, the popular football comics of the 1960s and 1970s such as Roy of the Rovers, and also satirises topical football incidents. Starred in a spinoff cartoon, voiced by Harry Enfield. According to Viz cartoonist Graham Dury, "half the readers thought [the strip] was shit, and the other half thought it was really shit." Undaunted, Viz cheerfully called one installment "Billy the Shit". Each episode ends with an 'on the brink' promising to resolve in the next publication...but never does.
- Billy No-Mates – a miserable, asocial teenage boy who spends most of his time alone in his dark room playing video games. If anyone disturbs him he becomes extremely irritated. He also has an obsession with masturbating, collecting large numbers of pornographic magazines and calling sex hotlines.
- Billy Quiz – a man who constantly acts like a game show host in everyday situations.
- The Binman that Fear Forgot - a heroic bin man fights away a ferocious lion guarding the bin; but then refuses to collect the waste because the lid of the bin is very slightly open and this is against regulation.
- Bipolar Bear – a polar bear who suffers from severe bipolar disorder.
- Biscuits Alive! – some biscuits that mysteriously come to life to help their boy owner out of some trivial problem.
- Black Bag – "The faithful border bin liner". A black bin liner which lives the exciting life of a sheepdog; a parody of The Dandy's Black Bob and the anthropomorphism of animals. Black Bag was drawn by Graham Murdoch, under the pen name of Snoddy (his cat). Black Bag rescued Brotherhood of Man from a well.
- Bo and Luke Brummell – A parody of The Dukes of Hazzard in which the two main characters are Regency-era dandies.
- Bob-a-Mob – A man who becomes violently enraged and attacks others he perceives as paedophiles, always due to some kind of misunderstanding or his own paranoia.
- Bob-Faced Betty of the Biscuit Shop Ballet – A young ballerina who, after plastic surgery gone wrong, is stuck with the face of TV presenter Bob Holness.
- Bob Mortified – One-off strip in which Bob Mortimer goes fishing with Paul Whitehouse. After failing to catch a single fish, Mortimer is so embarrassed he bursts into tears; while Whitehouse decides he'd rather fish with Harry Enfield instead.
- Bodley Basin – "He's On The Square". The adventures of a "strict Freemason". This one-off strip ended with the apparent murder of the cartoonist.
- Bonnie and Clyde – A young Bonnie Langford, in her role as Violet Elizabeth Bott, teams up with Clyde, the orangutan from the film Every Which Way But Loose, to commit robberies.
- Boswell Boyce – He Throws His Voice – An incompetent ventriloquist who repeatedly tries and fails to become famous.
- The Bottom Inspectors – based on the traffic wardens of Newcastle. The Bottom Inspectors were also influenced by a single editorial comment made by John Brown, the original publisher of Viz Comic: "The only editorial comment I ever made", explains Brown, "was in the early days, when I told Chris that I thought one issue was particularly 'bottomy'. He didn't say much at the time, but The Bottom Inspectors appeared for the first time in the next issue." Considerable overtones of Orwell's Nineteen Eighty-four as well as more than a hint of the Nazis (their ranks sound very Nazi: 'Herr Oberbottomführer!', etc.). Their shout 'BARE YOUR BOTTOMS!' has become almost iconic, even appearing on the front cover recently!
- Boy Scouse – a gang of delinquent schoolboys from Liverpool who earn Boy Scout badges for mugging pensioners, spraying graffiti and other such antisocial activities. MP Louise Ellman complained that it set a bad example and petitioned to have it banned.
- Boyz R Uz – A stereotypical boy band who are ripped off by their handler. They do not sing or dance – only mime.
- Brian's Bannister – An early strip about a boy who owned a bannister who tries to take it to the local park, only to find out that bannisters are not allowed in public.
- Brian Can't – Brian Cant becomes dissatisfied with working on Play School, as he feels that Humpty is not making an effort and has become too difficult to work with. Humpty insists that he's deliberately giving a more subdued, nuanced performance than Cant's, and ends up beating out Cant to win a BAFTA, while Cant is left to drown his sorrows with Professor Yaffle.
- Brian Cunt – a representative from a gas supply company, who, when called out to a suspected gas leak, does nothing to help and instead pressures the customer to buy a new central heating system they do not need, resulting in the house blowing up.
- Britpop Pop Bri – A man obsessed with nineties Britpop (especially Oasis).
- The Broon Windsors – a parody of the Royal Family in the style of The Broons and referring to Brown Windsor soup.
- Brown Bottle – a reporter (sometimes a bank clerk) who thinks he becomes a superhero when he is drunk on Newcastle Brown Ale. In reality, all that happens is that he becomes viciously drunk and passes out, but the twist in the story is that he manages to save the day anyway, by sheer accident. The character is based on Davey Graham, a musician friend of Chris Donald's, who made a similar transformation under the influence. Brown Bottle's enemy Ciderwoman (a "supervillain" who gets her powers from drinking cider) appeared in this strip and her own occasional strips in the magazine.
- Brucey's Magic Flying Carpet – A strip about Bruce Forsyth who goes around on his magic flying carpet helping some guy with his thatched cottage roof.
- The Builder's Curse - a gullible woman believes she is "cursed" because she keeps hiring builders to repair her garden wall, but they always suffer some misfortune and disappear after she has paid them for the work.
- Bryan Gigs – a young couple repeatedly encounter Bryan Ferry doing low-paid gig economy work, including as a pizza delivery man and Uber driver. Ferry evades questions about why he is doing these jobs despite his successful 50-year career in the music industry, and the couple speculate about how much money he really has.
- Buffalo Jill – a strip narrated in the style of 1950s–60s girls' comics, where a typical heroine from such comics (politely spoken and pony-loving) becomes a stagecoach robber in the Wild West, earning a vicious gang's respect by gorily shooting several people in the head. A reference to Buffalo Bill.
- Busted – who, until they disbanded in 2005, occasionally appeared in strips (as well as spoof interviews and other features in the magazine) portraying them as pyromaniacs/arsonists who would set anything on fire "for a laugh". James Bourne would always be referred to by the wrong name, making fun of his status as the "least famous" of the group.
- Buster Gonad and his Unfeasibly Large Testicles – An iconic VIZ strip featuring a boy who somehow manages to always solve people's problems with his ridiculously large testicles. Featured regularly in early editions, but since has faded out, however still appears every now and then.
- Buz – A parody of Kes where the titular kestrel is replaced with a bluebottle fly.
- Camberwick Greggs – a very bleak parody of Camberwick Green, where Mickey Murphy the baker is driven out of business after a branch of Greggs opens across the road. See also 'Trumptown'
- Calvin and the Chipmunks – A rip-off of a very famous chipmunk trio strip featuring John Calvin and some mischievous chipmunks who get him into trouble with King Henry VIII.
- Captain Morgan and his Hammond Organ – a pirate who sails round the Caribbean inviting people to sing along with him as he plays a Hammond organ. His character was cut when legal action was threatened over the copyright of some of the songs; according to creator Chris Donald in his book, he did not think that making the character sing royalty-free hymns or nursery rhymes would have quite the same comedic effect.
- Captain Captured – the man who's constantly caught. At the start of each strip, Captain Captured would get captured in a mysterious Bond villain-like fashion. He would then escape only to get captured again, and again, and again, and...
- Captain Magnetic – A strip about a man who claims to be a superhero with magnetic powers, only to find out his powers are useless.
- Captain Oats – a one-off strip lampooning the real Antarctic explorer Captain Lawrence Oates. An explorer obsessed with pornography and masturbation, he is depicted skiing across the icy wastes, dragging a wardrobe on its own set of skis upon which is hidden his stash of pornographic magazines. However, his efforts to masturbate are continually frustrated by the presence of his companions. Eventually he gives his famous line "I'm just going outside, I might be some time', and ends up in the latrine with his fingers freezing off.
- Captain Unreliable – A superhero who fails to save the day because of oversleeping, his car breaking down, etc.
- Careless McKenzie – A strip about a man who does all kinds of jobs in a reckless way.
- Cedric Soft - A counterbalance to Biffa Bacon (which see). He is utterly effeminate and when he appears is badly bullied by Biffa. He was originally represented as Percy Posh.
- Chadwell O'Cheese and his Cormorants of Futility – A strip about a boy who keeps cormorant birds and tries to save the mayor's balloon which got stuck in a tree, only to have him change his mind and so Chadwell hangs himself from the branch of the tree where the balloon is.
- Champion the Wonder Arse – Young Chip McCain had befriended a magnificent wild hairy arse named Champion, which roamed the plains around the little town of Windy Creek in Arizona.
- Charitable Chester – an unintelligent boy who constantly tries to raise money for charity, but either fails or raises very little, leaving his father (who has to foot the bill for either damages to a dairy or catering for a pop concert) seriously out of pocket.
- Charlie and the Sportswear Factory – A parody of Charlie and the Chocolate Factory where Charlie Buckett and his Grandpa Joe are hereby invited to Mickey Wonga's Sportswear factory where the workers are treated very cruelly.
- Charlie and Chubby Telly Voyeurs – a pair of security guards who misuse the CCTV cameras to leer at women rather than look for any wrongdoing – during which a robbery takes place.
- Charlie Christ – A one off strip about Charlie Chaplin depicted as Jesus Christ.
- Chester Thing – The comic character with no attribute whatsoever.
- Christ on a Bender – a strip which depicts Jesus as a family man who keeps trying to escape the house to get "crucified" with his friends but is thwarted at every turn by his wife forcing him to stay home with her and look after their children.
- Christ on a Bike – a strip which depicts Jesus's life riding a magical bicycle. Pontius Pilate has him crucified due to envy since Pilate only has a girl's bike.
- Christ School – A parody of the Bash Street Kids depicted as Jesus Christ.
- Cilla Blackbeard – a strip portraying Cilla Black as a vicious pirate captain who evades and defeats the Royal Navy, led by Admiral Noel Edmonds and his crew of rival TV presenters.
- Cindy Francis and her Kitty Cat Majorettes – A woman who thinks she has trained a team of cats to perform as majorettes. In reality, the cats just attack her or run away when she tries to get them to perform.
- Closet Casey Jones – A strip about an American train driver who fancies married women but secretly fancies muscular men.
- Cockney Wanker – a swaggering, bigoted Londoner who speaks in rhyming slang which is often concocted in his speech. The character is based on actor Mike Reid. He wears much cheap gold jewellery or Argos bling and East End gangster dark glasses, and is often seen smoking a cigar. Wanker's speciality is the buying and selling of cars, often buying one, selling it back to the same person at the same price and then waving his wad of cash declaring the transaction to have been "a nice little earner", although he has appeared in a considerable number of other enterprises, some of which actually work – at least for a while. He is the personification of the 'Northerners' impression of the -'London/Southern' personage. His name, as it contains an obscenity, is "spoonerised" whenever featured on the front page of an issue of Viz, as it would be easily read by children who are otherwise not entitled to buy the magazine. Hence he becomes "Wockney Canker", or it's covered by a picture element.
- Colin the Amiable Crocodile – strips centred on a small crocodile named Colin. In one strip he was shot by a birdwatcher because he said "hello" to the man. The character also appeared later on front covers of other issues, such as with a skinhead who tells people to buy the comic or he shoots the croc. Overtones of Loopy De Loop
- Colin and his Conker – a boy obsessed with playing conkers.
- The Conference Kids – two children who work with their father in organising business conferences on mundane subjects.
- Cop Her Knickers – an elderly woman's dealings with a gang of policemen who are constantly, and inexplicably, trying to steal her underwear (issue 126)
- Copper Kettle – quoted as "The PC who loves his PG" (PG meaning tea brand PG Tips), the strip follows the life of the policeman and his futile attempts to obtain some tea – his favourite beverage – while on his beat.
- Corky the Twat – a cat that is hired by Viz to get up to amusing comic-style antics and make readers laugh. Unfortunately, Corky is a normal cat and would rather scratch the furniture or hunt mice than do anything funny. The editor ends up taking him back to the pet shop to ask for something "more anthropomorphic." The strip is a parody of Korky the Cat.
- Courier of the Track – One-off strip about a parcel delivery courier who is recruited for the Olympics when a coach sees how fast he runs back to the van after posting a 'Sorry we missed you' card through his letterbox.
- Crap Jokes – a diverse range of verbal and visual puns or one-liners, usually deliberately corny or old-fashioned. The best known of the Crap Jokes are seemingly endless "Doctor, Doctor" gags, with the reader's sympathy drawn to the endlessly hapless straight man Doctor.
- Crawford Crayon – He's Quick On The Sketch – a one-off story about a brilliant and mischievous quick-sketch artist, whose 'harmless fun' leads to the death of the hapless Bully Smith.
- The Critics – pretentious and shallow high-culture critics who lampoon the perceived elitism of the "chattering classes". They work for The Sunday Chronicle, though they have done freelance work with the BBC and Channel 4, writing elitist and sometimes sycophantic articles on contemporary art. The artists they admire are all fictional but are clearly inspired by real-life artists such as Damien Hirst and Tracey Emin. A frequent plot device involves Natasha and Crispin mistaking some everyday object – like a fire extinguisher, puddle of vomit or even some public toilets – as a piece of modern art. In other episodes, they do not grasp the concept of art at all. They once received a booby prize at the Critics' Awards for bringing the reputation of critics into disrepute for writing a review that was not only positive, but actually made sense!
- Crypto Nige – A man who tries to get his uninterested friends and family to invest in cryptocurrency, only to end up losing all his money.
- The Cuckoo Clock Chalet Ballet School – one-off strip about a group a ballerinas attending a dance school in the Swiss Alps shaped like a cuckoo clock working together to prevent Tim Martin from buying the building and turning it into a Wetherspoons.
- Daley Starr – a schoolboy aspiring to be a journalist, who turns his family's and classmates' misfortunes into exaggerated "scoops". His name is a play on the Daily Star tabloid newspaper.
- Danny Davis and the Robot Pimp – a young boy whose best friend is an android pimp from outer space.
- Danny's District Council – a one-off story parodying General Jumbo of The Beano, in which a young boy commands his own electronic radio-controlled district council. The tiny robotic council workers are all lazy, corrupt and incompetent and eventually switch their allegiance to the villains. The comic occasionally features other parodies of General Jumbo, including "Jimbo Jumbo's Robo Jobos", "Oliver's Army" and "Drill-Sergeant Jumbo".
- Darren Dice – a young man who is obsessed with gambling. Sadly, he often chooses to gamble with the wrong crowd. The character is allegedly based on, and bears a remarkable resemblance to, retired Scottish footballer Darren Jackson. Jackson spent a couple of seasons at Newcastle United in the late 1980s and became a familiar face in bookmakers' shops in the city.
- D.C. Thompson The Humourless Scottish Git – created in retaliation after D. C. Thomson & Co. Ltd threatened legal action over a variety of Viz spoofs based on characters from The Beano and The Dandy, including Biffa Bacon, Black Bag, "Roger the Lodger", "Wanker Watson", "Arsehole Kate" and many more. The title character was portrayed as a miserly stereotypical Scotsman (complete with tam o'shanter, kilt and sporran) who goes about looking for breaches of copyright he can report, such as threatening to sue a woman who calls her son Dennis a "menace" in his earshot, and demanding that a pet shop owner remove an advertisement for "Three Bears for the Price of Two" from the shop window. Eventually, he becomes so enraged that he urinates in his kilt. Not to be outdone, The Dandy responded by resurrecting an old strip The Jocks and the Geordies – representing the Scottish-based D.C. Thomson and Newcastle upon Tyne-based Viz. In the strip, the rival gangs of schoolboys are asked to produce a comic. The Jocks' comic is better, of course, but the underhand Geordies decide to copy them. Viz responded in kind by parodying Korky the Cat as "Corky the Twat" in the next issue.
- Debt of Honour – a Mafia hitman is tasked with buying cement from a DIY store for a mob assassination, but fails due to the unhelpful shop staff, problems with the self-checkout, etc.
- Dench's Benches – A strip where Dame Judi Dench lounges all over a pair of park benches and chases away a man who wanted to sit on one of them.
- Denis Helium – a boy who believes he is as light as a feather, but is in fact quite obese.
- Dennis the Red Menace – a Communist-themed parody of Dennis the Menace.
- Derek Anorak - An extremely socially inept young man obsessed with Star Trek and other sci-fi media.
- Derek's Boots – A one off strip about a boy called Derek Hobson who wore a big pair of Doctor Marten boots and went around and kicked everyone, only to get a new pair of smaller shoes and then get kicked by the people he once harmed.
- Desert Island Desk – a dialogue-free strip about an office desk which has been marooned on a desert island; the title refers to Desert Island Discs and the Topper comic story Desert Island Dick.
- Desert Island Teacher – a teacher stranded on a windswept rock. He has decided that "once a teacher, always a teacher", and inflicts monotonous lectures on the seagulls and molluscs. A major feature of the strip is that he never actually says anything of any academic value, but instead spends all his time saying iconic teacher's statements like "Face the front" and "I will not start until I have absolute quiet". He is rescued by a navy search and rescue team, only to admonish them as if they were a delinquent pupil, saying: "You think you're so clever, being able to fly a helicopter, but it's not going to help you in the real world." The rescue crew throw him off the helicopter for insulting them.
- Desperately Unfunny Dan – parody of barrel-chested Desperate Dan who tries too hard to amuse people with his superhuman feats of strength.
- Diane Abbott and Costello – A strip where Diane Abbott and Lou Costello are guest presenters of Question Time, but argue over the seating plan, with Costello constantly misunderstanding Abbott's instructions in the style of his famous routine Who's on First?
- The Diary of Samuel L. Pepys - portraying Samuel L. Jackson as a well-to-do gentleman in 17th-century London, who keeps a diary of his exploits. In the style of the type of character Jackson is known for playing in films, he attends a society ball; kills the host in a violent shoot-out; and seduces the host's two daughters, who are left "the richest bitches in Southwark" after their father's death.
- Dickie Beasley – a schoolboy who wants to be an ad executive. His attempts to advertise or improve something menial (e.g. a church jumble sale) and fails because he puts too much thought and planning into it (treating as something more complex).
- Dickie's Disappointing Grandpa – A one off strip about a boy whose grandfather is an inventor who makes the most boring contraptions ever.
- Doctor Poo – a spoof of Doctor Who depicting the title character, utterly desperate to move his bowels, unable to find a toilet in the whole of space–time. He eventually relieves himself in Davros's "private shitehouse" on the planet Skaro. The story was animated with the Dr Who theme incorporating considerable farts in the notes.
- Doctor Poolittle – a spoof of Doctor Dolittle depicting the title character severely constipated and attempting to learn how to defecate from zoo animals. After a lion roars at him, he soils his trousers.
- Doctor Sex – "He has the power of all sex."
- Doctor Theodore Gray and his Fantastic Growth Ray – A one off strip about a scientist who invented a formula to make things increase in size. However, when he tries it on a local policeman, it all backfires.
- Doctor Wholittle – a parody of Doctor Who and Doctor Dolittle where the Doctor travels back in time to speak to dinosaurs before their extinction.
- Dom and Jerry – a once-only quarter-page parody of Tom and Jerry where a BDSM-obsessed cat is trying to catch the mouse to perform his twisted sexual acts on it.
- Door Matt – A one-off strip featuring a man (Matthew) and his relationship with his...fiancée? who has him utterly under her thumb and is carrying on with other people, not even trying to hide it. At one point she leaves him waiting in the car at the airport and takes off to Ibiza with his credit card, lives the high-life, and on returning (while he has been waiting all this time and reasoning that she must be held up!) treats him like muck. A friend tries to reason with him, but fails badly, ending up in bed with the girl in question, who tells Matt to go away and leave them to it – which he does. Sad, but one feels that there are indeed poor misbegottens like Matt in the world.
- Dr Pandemonium and the Ray Gun of Death - a supervillain has created a ray gun capable of annihilating an entire city, but fails to get it to work because he can't fix a simple blown fuse.
- Drake's Cake – He's Got a Cake For Heaven's Sake – A strip about Sir Francis Drake trying to protect a cake.
- Driving David Beckham or Driving Mister David – a spoof of Beezer and (later) Beano comic strip "The Numskulls" in which we see the inner thought processes – or lack thereof – of David Beckham. The title is based on the film Driving Miss Daisy.
- Drooly-Doo – a parody of Scooby-Doo set during the Russian Revolution.
- Drum Miner – a drummer who can only play in confined spaces, made redundant by the closure of his local coal mine. He attempts to find work, but fails due to his niche abilities and finally commits suicide by jumping off his bass drum with a noose around his neck. Tragically, an eccentric millionaire appears minutes later looking to offer permanent employment to someone who can play drums inside his cupboard. A spoof of the films of Ken Loach.
- Drunken Bakers – a long-running, darkly-hilarious strip about two alcoholic bakers who, because of their affliction, hardly ever manage to bake anything, and if they actually do it is almost always spoiled by one of them vomiting over it. Their shop is run down and is often burnt down due to a left-on stove and has few customers; the pair sometimes look back to more prosperous, happier times, but are always brought back to their dismal present-day reality. See the link for a fuller description.
- Eight Ace – A long-running and iconic strip featuring an alcoholic who drinks "Ace" beer (eight cans for £1.49) and struggles to stay on the right side of his wife and many children. Because of his alcoholism, he is not allowed to live in the house and ends up sleeping off the latest hangover in a shed in the front garden. Many of the strips involve Ace being entrusted with or somehow managing to acquire exactly £1.49 which he inevitably uses to buy "Eight Ace" from Patel's "Twenty-four-hour nano-mart". His real name has been mentioned as "Octavius Tinsworthy Federidge Ace", the "Federidge" in his name being derived from the now-defunct Federation Brewery which brewed "Ace" lager, and "Octavius" being derived from octo, Latin for "eight". The "Tinsworthy" refers to the cans (or "tins") of beer. Hence his name parallels "eight tins of Federation Ace". He has been unofficially voted the "Patron Saint of Dead Losses".
- Eight Ball Joe – An early strip from the early 1980s where the titular character is portrayed with no intelligence.
- Electric Space Copter Kid – A boy who thinks he is a superhero with an "electric space copter" that is actually just a space hopper. He accidentally stops a fleeing robber (who crashes his getaway vehicle, distracted by the space hopper) and wins an award from the police.
- Elton John's... – a series of strips have the pop star portrayed as a petty scamster. The strips typically open with Elton engaged in a stereotypical celebrity activity like launching a new album, being interviewed for a celebrity magazine, or partying with fellow A-listers. But they soon descend into the surreal when, despite his enormous wealth and fame, Elton embarks on a small-scale con to make trivial amounts of cash. Scams include 'Baccy Run', 'Dole Fiddle', 'Hooky Videos', 'Electrical Goods Scam', 'Bandit Beater', 'Lottery Syndicate Diddle' (consisting of himself, Bono, Phil Collins and Paul McCartney), 'Roofing Racket', 'Marked Note Con', 'Window Cleaning Scam' and 'Compen Con'. At the end of each strip Elton, having been rumbled through bad luck or incompetence, (or both) is normally shown to have been beaten at his own game by other celebrities, often in disguise, mostly his "enemies", e.g. David Bowie, The Bee Gees, Rod Stewart, Diana Ross and the Supremes or "the surviving members of Queen", who are shown launching more successful small-scale scams of their own, often singing iconic lines, sometimes adapted, from their own songs.
- Embarrassing Wife – One-off quarter-page strip featuring a two-faced husband attending a party with his wife. Just as they ring the bell the husband warns the wife 'not to do anything stupid'. He then goes on to behave disgustingly, drinking to excess, slobbering over another female party-goer, vomiting in the flowers, bashing the host and finally ending up with his trousers around his ankles and a lamp-shade on his head, dead drunk, and with the wife carefully saying (probably in a whisper) 'I think maybe its time we made tracks dear.' He responds with heavy sarcasm, 'DO you!' In the car back home he berates her: 'I hope you're satisfied! You made me look like a right fool back there!'
- Eminemis The Menace – starred in a one-off strip, a cross between Eminem and Dennis the Menace.
- Eric Daft – "His IQ is less than 2" – An early Terry Fuckwitt prototype.
- Escape from Nativity Play Year 3B - a pastiche of The Great Escape, where a group of teachers conspire to escape the school hall and get out of an interminable nativity play (which has been running for over 2 hours and the Angel Gabriel still hasn't appeared.)
- Eskimo Mel - A one-off strip from Viz no 45. An Inuit child and a British child were swapped at birth. Mel, the Inuit child, brought up in Britain, annoys people by dressing and behaving as a stereotypical "Eskimo" character. The final panel reveals that his counterpart, dressed in British school uniform, is causing similar annoyance to an Inuit tribe.

== F–J ==
- Farmer Palmer – a paranoid, money-grabbing farmer with an inbred son and daughter (who go on to marry each other) whose catch phrase is "Get orf moi laaaand!". He frequently berates and physically threatens (usually with a double-barrelled shotgun) innocent members of the public for encroaching on his property, yet he hypocritically treats the countryside with complete disdain. He has a habit of shooting every dog he sees with a shotgun, claiming "'Ee wuz worrying moi sheep." or words to that effect. In one extreme example, the dog's owner claimed his dog was on public property and thus well within its right to be there. Farmer Palmer then had his son Jethro transport the dog to his own farm with a tractor, to get an excuse to shoot it. Farmer Palmer and Jethro later appear in an episode of The Fat Slags animated series. Often he will go out of his way to make someone's life miserable, such as waiting until a car nears the gate at which his tractor is parked. He gets Jethro to stop the car while he drives out in front, then with Jethro on board he drives away very slowly, with a sign saying 'No Overtaking for the Next 25 miles' showing in the last frame. Twice he has hosted a huge music festival just like Max Yasgur who hosted the original Woodstock, once in a full two-page feature, which as you look at it, it becomes obvious that it is nothing but a money-grabbing venture, and in the other he introduces Snoop Dogg as the star, only to go backstage and grab his gun. As Snoop is introducing his first song, Palmer shoots him with the usual phrase "E were worrying moi shizzles!" (Snoop is a 'dog' after all!) Then he stands in the middle of the stage and thunders to the enormous but now silent crowd, "Now Get Orf Moi Laaand!"
- Farting Dilemmas with Archie McBlarter – see "Archie McBlarter"
- Father McFiddly – "He Loves Diddling Kiddlies" – about the antics of a priest trying to peek up the altar-boys' cassocks, etc. A skit on the Catholic sex abuse cases scandal.
- The Fat Slags – A long-running and iconic strip featuring two enormous sluttish women living in Mansfield. San (Sandra Burke) and Tray (Tracey Tunstall), have huge appetites for both sex and food. Starred in a spinoff cartoon and a live-action movie.
- Fat Sod – a one-off greedy character who steals a large pie from the windowsill of one Farmer Palmer (possibly the same character described above, despite physical dissimilarity), only to be ruthlessly shot dead and baked in a pie by Palmer, who hides inside the false pie initially stolen to do so. (001)
- Father's Day at the Carvery - a man takes his elderly father to a carvery for a Father's Day treat, but is annoyed by his father's constant complaints about the food and pedantic instructions as to how to eat it.
- Father Christmas – a man so obsessed with Christmas he believes that it is the festive season in the middle of August.
- Fatty and Skinny, Susannah and Trinny – A strip portraying Susannah Constantine and Trinny Woodall as school bullies who ridicule classmates for their unfashionable clothes, only to end each cartoon forced to wear a horrendously uncomfortable outfit for detention or gym class. This strip prompted legal action from Woodall and Constantine themselves.
- Feet and Two Reg – Two neighbours (who as the title suggests are called Reg) who are due to enter a competition where their diseased feet are to be judged where one of them trying to ruin the other's chances by curing his bad feet, but failing.
- Felix and his Amazing Underpants – a boy with underpants which he believes have amazing powers. They are in fact completely ordinary, albeit being a bizarrely large size. Occasionally, he manages to do good deeds with his underwear in order to help out someone in need, for example, using his underpants as a container for a French salesman's onions. Often he removes his underwear and appears naked, but is never done for obscenity; fig-leaved by a lifted leg, his rather large stomach, or picture element, or turned away from the viewer. The comic strip was created by editor Chris Donald, but is now drawn by Lew Stringer.
- Ferdinand the Foodie – a self-proclaimed culinary expert and restaurant critic.
- Finbarr Saunders and his double entendres – a boy with a good ear for homophones. The strip almost always revolves around his liaisons with his neighbour, Mr Gimlet, whose manner of speech is always interpreted by Finbarr as graphically sexual in nature (in fact, it is deliberately scripted this way), usually when Gimlet is reminiscing about everyday situations with Saunders' mother. However, at the end of each strip, Mr Gimlet and Finbarr's mother invariably do end up having sex and make blatantly obvious verbal references to their doing so, but Finbarr interprets these as being nothing untoward. Finbarr's creator, Simon Thorp, described the character as a cross between a small boy and Sid Boggle (Sid James) from Carry On Camping. He is sometimes visited by his mother's Russian friend, Sergei, whose English pronunciation is very bad, which results in his sentences being corrupted in often lewd ways (for instance, "Your mother wants me to fetch her aerosol" becomes "Your mother wants me to felch her arsehole").
- Fixed-Odds Betty – a sombre one-off strip depicting a woman selling her possessions and emptying her bank account to buy her grandson a bike for his birthday, only to end up being waylaid by his mother and spending it all at a fixed-odds betting machine in a bookmakers while the boy waits outside in the rain. This strip guest-starred the main character from fellow Viz strip "We ..."
- Flash Harry – a man who is constantly trying to indecently expose himself to women but regularly fails.
- Floater Boy - inflicted with the curse of floating poos, floater boy drifts through life leaving floating poos wherever he has a dump. One day he is passing a lake and sees a young lady drowning. Don't worry he shouts I'll save you and drops his kecks and pops out a floating poo and saves the day as the young lady grabs onto the poo which keeps her afloat until help arrives. Floater Boy and the Young Lady Walk off into the sunset hand in hand....
- Foodie Bollocks – a man obsessed with artisan food who goes into a fish and chip shop or bakery or other very ordinary shop and asks a string of annoying questions about the food as if he is ordering from a Michelin-starred restaurant. One strip has him ordering an ice-cream from an ice cream van wanting to know about the story of all the ingredients and getting punched in the face by the man behind the queue as he is taking ages to decide – a happening which is by no means unique. After refusing to go back to work post-lockdown because 'his regime (to make sourdough bread) is at a critical phase', he loses his job. Unusually for Viz, this becomes an ongoing storyline as he spirals into poverty but maintains his extremely specific tastes in food, for example refusing to eat tomatoes from a food bank.
- The Folkie – a man who tends to sing everything like a folk song annoying everybody (even other folk singers), even having an appearance of a folk singer (sporting a beard, wearing clogs and a thick woollen jumper).
- Foul-Mouthed Super-Obese Mobility Scooter Woman – a lazy, benefit-dependent woman who blames her total lack of work ethic on her morbid obesity; which requires her to use a mobility scooter.
- Friar Fuck – a monk with Tourette's syndrome.
- Frankenstein's Cock – a parody of Frankenstein in which the scientist has created a giant, sentient penis which comes to life and is hunted through the town by the traditional torch-wielding mob. Prompted follow-ups and sequels in the comic including "Frankenstein's Turd" and "Frankenstein's Cock Must Be Destroyed".
- Frankie Feel – an early strip featuring a man who is always grabbing women's breasts.
- Frugal Sharkey – a miser who goes to extreme lengths to cut costs. His name and appearance are based on the singer Feargal Sharkey.
- Fru T. Bunn – a "Master Baker" who makes his own sex dolls out of gingerbread and then attempts to have sex with them. Often he actually succeeds, only to be discovered in the last frame by his wife and daughter (Little Chelsea – ref to the Chelsea Bun)!!
- Garry and Barry the Identical Twins – a boy convinced that a tree in his garden is actually his identical twin brother.
- George Best is a Cinema Pest – a one-off strip featuring George Best prematurely disclosing the final twists of notable movies such as The Sixth Sense and The Usual Suspects to incensed cinema goers.
- George Bestial – a George Best lookalike who, as his name implies, enjoys committing bestiality. After the death of the real Best, the strip was redesigned so that it became longer (full-page), the title character looks less like Best, and his zoophilia is merely the most obvious symptom of his clearly very disturbed mind.
- Genie Loophole – One-off strip about a man who finds a lamp containing a genie in his attic and, dismayed to find he only gets one wish instead of the usual three, wishes to live his life over again with his memories intact so he can accumulate knowledge and experience in order to find the lamp again and make the best wish he can. After doing this a couple of times he finally makes his wish... asking which horse will win the 3:30 at Chepstow.
- Gilbert Ratchet – a boy who can invent anything, usually to solve people's bizarre "problems" as he comes across them. However, his inventions invariably cause far more problems of their own. Usually, the entire premise of the strip turns out to be a highly contrived misunderstanding. Gilbert's creator, Davey Jones, describes the character as "like (the Dandy's) Screwy Driver—only with more genital mutilation of vicars".
- Gin Damon – A man who is obsessed with gin yet fails to realise how much he has drunk.
- God Save the Queen – A one off strip about God trying to watch a football match when he keeps getting interrupted by an old woman because her Queen Elizabeth II clones roam rampant on a building site and he has to save them.
- God, You're Embarrassing – A strip which depicts God, embarrassing his son, Jesus in front of his disciples.
- Goldfish Boy – a schoolboy who lives in a goldfish bowl and is raised by the Reverend Brown.
- Gordon's Grandad – one-off strip about a boy who believes his perfectly ordinary grandfather has magical powers. The strip ends with the death of the grandfather, devastating Gordon who believes that Grandad was about to build him a time machine.
- Gordon Zola and Cheddar George – they get up to various pranks involving cheese, until a policeman beats them to death with a giant smoked cheese "for all the cheese-related trouble you've caused"
- Graffiti Art – a young man desperately trying to offend others with obscene graffiti but only succeeds in being recognised as a talented street artist pushing boundaries.
- Grandfather Clock – A strip about a senile old man who insists on living inside a grandfather clock, much to his grandson's dismay. The clock is stolen by burglars, and the police retrieve Grandpa, who moves into a cuckoo clock instead.
- Granny Smith – an old woman who has a habit of murdering people.
- Grassy Knollington – a nerdy, bespectacled schoolboy conspiracy theorist who would spend every strip putting together and explaining long, complicated and outlandish theories (mostly lasting the whole strip) behind certain events (such as 9/11 and the death of Diana, Princess of Wales) often to the exasperation of his friends/mother. Typically, at the end of the strip, it would be revealed that Grassy was actually correct (occasionally concluding with him being assassinated). His name is a pun based on the 'Grassy Knoll' where it is said a gunman was hiding who shot JFK.
- The Green Grass – a one-off, quarter-page strip where Orville the Duck is caught and destroyed by a Government respond unit during a bird flu epidemic after being betrayed by Cuddles the Monkey who is identified in the final frame.
- Guy's Pie – A strip about a person called Guy with a pie which gets stolen by Low Self Esteem Larson the neighbourhood bully, only to find out the pie maker put teeth in it.
- Gym'll Fix It – An amateur bodybuilder obsessed with working out, following bizarre diets, and taking performance-enhancing drugs in an effort to build muscle.
- Hambo - A parody of Rambo, in which a mentally ill man thinks he is a commando in the Vietnam War. He treats a trip to buy cigarettes as a military operation; almost decapitates himself with his own machete; and kills several innocent people he believes are the Viet Cong.
- Harold and Fred – they make ladies dead! – A one-off strip in which serial killers Harold Shipman and Fred West compete to be the first to murder a new female neighbour; only to discover that she is actually Ed Gein wearing the skin of one of his victims. This strip created controversy in the media, including complaints from the families of some of Shipman's victims.
- Harry Botter – a gay wizard who is obsessed with men's bottoms.
- Harry Quartz, Para-Dental Hygienist – A dental hygienist who patrols a war zone and drags injured soldiers away to have dental work done.
- Helpful Herbert – A boy whose good deeds always land him in big trouble.
- Hector the collector and his metal detector – strips about a boy named Hector who finds big and small things with his metal detector. In one strip he found a key that according to a passing rich man opened up a chest with gold inside and gave him £500. The character later returned in the 30th edition comic.
- Hell Below Zero – One-off strip depicting a man on a zero-hours contract called in by his boss first thing in the morning and made to wait around all day while only being paid for 37 minutes of work. This same concept was used as an episode of 'We...' and a separate although related strip, 'My Workfare Lady' (which see).
- Hen Cabin – A takeaway run by two scruffy, dishonest men who cut corners by making their takeaways from chicken utterly unfit for consumption or using easily obtained birds (such as pigeons or in one episode, seagulls!) instead of chicken. Their product is quite unpalatable, but they keep doggedly on making it. Often, they go out of their way to make their opposite numbers (on the same street or very close by) to appear worse than themselves. Mostly they fail.
- Here Come the Trouble Deckers - a group of troublemaking children (similar to those in the Our Gang films) wreak havoc aboard a double-decker bus.
- Hermit the Frog – A one-off three-panelled strip about Kermit the Frog from The Muppet Show living in a shed with the curtains closed.
- High Wire Building Society – A strip about a building society located in a circus.
- Hikaru Nikkoro – A Japanese businessman attempting to steal women's used underwear.
- The Hippopotamus Man – A paedophile who believes he is a hippopotamus. He infuriates everyone around him by informing them that he is a hippopotamus, while continuing to try to abuse children. This strip guest starred The Parkie (which see)
- Honour-Bound – A strip about a Samurai trying to defecate.
- Hubble and Bubble – "They're looking for trouble". This strip portrays two policemen, one appearing normal and the other a caricature of a pig. They are out to make as much trouble as possible, even concocting situations for their own 'entertainment'. One episode has an elderly lady bewailing her cat up a tree. H & B come on the scene and immediately accuse her of using the tree ('This big lump of wood') to attack them. Both woman and cat finally are murdered, and the two 'cover their badges' and leave.
- Hugh Phemism – He is unable to communicate in anything other than circumlocutory language, leading to predictable misunderstandings.
- Hugo Hall – He Makes Things Small – A strip about a kid who discovered a unique shrinking device with which he was able to reduce objects in size.
- Hula-Hoop Emergency Ward – A one off strip about surgeons who attempt to save a man's life while at the same time, whirling hula hoops around their waists.
- The Hunchback of Notre-Dame's Got Talent – A strip where "Quasiboylo" (a cross between Quasimodo and Susan Boyle) fights to win a talent contest (playing a washboard!) and gain the honour of performing at the King's wedding.
- Hurricane Heather (She Changes the Weather) – A girl who has a magic ring that is supposed to change the weather, but actually transports her to a desert island, while her ring ends up in the clutches of a fish (which Heather says is silly and ends the strip there.)
- Ignatius Manatee's Dixieland Jazz Band – A group of manatees who are a jazz band but are often having their gigs stolen by a group of Ragtime playing dugongs, but always get the last laugh.
- Il Duce, Old Duce – A strip featuring Benito Mussolini who wants the people of the town to bow down to his fascist dictatorship, but his hippie father keeps ruining his day.
- Incontinent Boxing Tortoise Hero – a senile old man who believes he is a superhero with tortoise-themed powers. In reality he fails to defeat a gang of robbers and wets himself again.
- Insane Clown Posse and the Church Jumble Sale Mystery – a strip in which Violent J and Shaggy 2 Dope investigate theft at a church jumble sale.
- The Intern – A strip telling the story of Tom Golightly, who dreams of being an advertising executive and in 1981 manages to get himself a one-year unpaid internship. The internship ends up lasting decades, as Tom waits to get a paid position at his firm even as he is constantly passed over for jobs (despite making the company a fortune with successful advertising campaigns, with his bosses taking all the credit) due to nepotism. Finally in March 2020 Tom's patience pays off and he is finally given a paid job at the firm, albeit as a mere teaboy. Unfortunately on the day Tom is due to begin his actual employment with the company at which he has worked at unpaid for almost 40 years (which is also his 61st birthday) he is told he is being furloughed due to the COVID-19 pandemic, with the firm folding a couple of months later.
- International Plywood Are Go – a parody of Thunderbirds where the Tracy family step in to help a construction company that doesn't have enough plywood to finish a housing project.
- Ivan Jelical – an evangelistic fundamentalist Christian whose proselytising is spectacularly unsuccessful. He is only ever happy when he is God-bothering, "comforting" grieving widows with descriptions of their husbands' (supposed) sufferings in Hell and getting himself beaten up in the process. On one occasion, after failing to convert a single person all day he hanged himself (though this did not stop him reappearing alive in a new strip a few months later). He (and his fellow evangelists) are often portrayed with "spinning" eyes, a display of their unawareness of the real world.
- Ivor the Skiver – "His dad's a bad driver". One-off strip in which a boy begs his father for a lift as he is too lazy to walk to school. Due to Ivor's dad having poor road sense, they are involved in a crash and end up seriously injured in the hospital, where they are reminded that it was Saturday and Ivor did not have to go to school anyway.
- Jack Black and his dog Silver – a young amateur detective staying with his Aunt Meg on an eternal school holiday. Often gets well-meaning people, who have done nothing wrong, arrested (or worse) on a minor technicality or obscure law for his own benefit, sometimes with another awful crime being committed right under his nose which he completely fails to notice. The first strip was apparently "traced by Chris Donald", according to fellow Viz cartoonist Davey Jones, "out of an old copy of Whizzer and Chips". As the strip has progressed, Jack has been increasingly portrayed as a racist and a xenophobe among other major faults. Jack's adventures are regularly drawn in the style of other comics (such as Tintin or Asterix), taking place in other countries (such as a manga-style strip relocating the action to Tokyo) and even in different time periods (including the Victorian era, the French Revolution, the Future Space Era and the Stone Age).
- Jack in the Box – A strip about the titular character who sets about doing cardboard box related pranks, only to be involved in a car accident.
- Jack The Hat Comes Back – a parody of The Cat in the Hat in which London gangster Jack McVitie shows up at the home of two children and wreaks havoc while their mother is out.
- Janet Street-Porter Crusoe and her Researcher Friday - Janet Street-Porter gets stranded on a desert island with her long-suffering assistant, and continues to act like a diva even as they face a host of perils.
- Jasper the Gasper – A homeless man who is desperate for a cigarette.
- Jamie Bond 007 – A child parody of James Bond. Rather than go with the plot that Jamie is just a regular child who is delusional about his secret agent alter ego and that his next door neighbour is not really a global villain out for world domination. The latter is indeed revealed to be one, whose plot Jamie foils and then makes his escape with the story's Bond girl.
- Jarvis Cocker's Quest for Knockers – A one-off strip in which Jarvis Cocker is a pervert desperately trying to look for a pair of breasts to ogle.
- Jellyhead – The girl with no brain. A one-off superhero parody about a girl born with lime jelly instead of a brain. Jellyhead spends her entire time in this story in a catatonic state, yet still manages to foil an armed robbery. The one-off strip was the work of Charlie Higson.
- The Adventures of Jeremy Clarkson, the Petrolhead Motormouth – One-off strip featuring former Top Gear presenter Jeremy Clarkson talking extensively about cars to an uninterested Big Issue salesman.
- Jeremy Futcher – His Dad's a Butcher – - A strip about the titular boy who goes around solving problems with his father's select cuts of meat, only to have him being butchered.
- Jimbo Jones – a parody of General Jumbo where a boy owns a different army of remote-control robots in every strip, from Jehovah's Witnesses to beauty pageant contestants.
- Jimmy Hill – The bespectacled and bearded television presenter. He has become something of a cult following as his caricature has turned up in all shapes and sizes, hiding in many of the strips, and often spotted by write-ins, claiming money for discovering him.
- Jimmy's Nails - a strip about Jimmy Nail being unable to cut his toenails.
- Joe, 90 – A once-only spoof of the iconic character. The World Intelligence Agency decides to recruit Joe for a new mission, despite the fact he is now in his 90s and extremely frail. He is briefed on the dangerous mission (despite such a venture obviously being both physically and mentally beyond him) and placed in the 'Big Rat', only for him to die while his abilities are transferred. The strip ends with the agency deciding to call International Rescue.
- Joe Blogs – a teenager trying, and spectacularly failing, to become famous from his online blog.
- Joe Robinson Crusoe – a thinly disguised parody of flamboyant Newcastle pub and nightclub operator Joe Robertson.
- John Logie Baird – A strip about the Scottish inventor who makes a machine that spouts out faeces. His rival from next door, the Italian inventor known as Guglieimo Marconi, is envious, so tries to outdo the Scottish inventor by making a machine that spouts out testicles. The strip ends with the two surprised by the English inventor Tim Berners-Lee and his machine that spouts out male and female reproductive systems.
- Johnny Condor – A boy who thinks he can fly, but invariably cannot.
- Johnny Fartpants – An iconic and long-running strip about a boy afflicted with extreme flatulence. (Not to be confused with Archie McBlarter) Tagline: There's always a commotion in his trousers. He suffers from extreme, excessive flatulence which is not only offensive to the nose and ears, but destructive to those around him. His gaseous emissions have been known to destroy houses and other hard-surfaced articles, as well as injure people. He is always apologetic, and constantly reminds people that his colonic expulsions are beyond his control – despite his insistence on "keeping to a strict pump diet", which often includes beans, brussels sprouts and "cabbage water". In Viz 166 (June/July 2007), Johnny was forced by his father to attend a lecture on global warming, presented by none other than Al Gore, so that he would learn about the impact his farting was having on the environment. When Johnny intentionally farted during the applause for Gore (so that nobody would hear it), the former Vice President became violently ill, causing Johnny to observe that Gore was now "greener" than his environmental message. On another occasion, while attending the funeral of Margaret Thatcher, he is warned by his father not to attempt any such shenanigans, but then the vicar informs them that the bugler who was to perform 'The Last Post' has fallen ill. Johnny immediately volunteers for the job and promptly performs a ripping rendition of 'Shave and a Haircut'!
- Jonathon Ringpiece – A one off strip about a man who wants to cause controversy.
- Judge Dudd – A parody of Judge Dredd, who commits various crimes (murder, bribery, etc.) and gets away with them by granting himself a pardon, since he's the ultimate judge and jury - only to be killed by his traffic warden equivalent when he double parks, which was by far the least serious of his many infractions.
- Jump Jet Fanny and her Hawker-Siddeley Twat – A woman who can perform VTOL (vertical take-off and landing) with her vagina. Other strips using the same premise included "Hawker Siddeley Harriet" and "Colin Concorde Cock".
- June and Terry Sitcom – A parody of Terry and June where a couple constantly find themselves in very contrived sitcom-style situations.
- Junior Cop – a boy who acts like a policeman, informing a mother that her son has died (annoying her as it's not true, as her son is watching TV in the other room) and battering a confession out of his own mother (with the support of his father who is actually a policeman himself).
- Just Williams – a parody of the Just William stories by Richmal Crompton, with Archbishop Rowan Williams in the place of Crompton's boy-hero. Williams steals buns from the kitchen and allows his pet mice to escape during a General Synod meeting, whilst maintaining a William-esque self-justificatory monologue.
- Justin Welby's The Faithful Five - a parody of The Famous Five portrayed as Church of England vicars

== K–O ==
- Kenny Loggins and his Many Log-Ins – a short four-panel strip about Loggins becoming frustrated because he cannot remember all his online passwords.
- Kent Barker is Mr Mediocre – ace photographer with the Daily Pie is convinced he has superpowers after swallowing a flat HP2 battery as a child. (003)
- Kewl Chix – shallow, vacuous and materialistic teenage girls, whose names often end in IX, such as Bix, Vix, etc. who only care about their social life and public image. Initially presented as bimbo/dumb blonde caricatures but in recent years the strip has primarily served as a satire of social networking sites and text messaging. Often their observed lives have nothing to do with reality, which leads to considerable clashes with their surrounds.
- Kid Politician – a child who speaks and behaves like a politician (for example, producing dubious statistics to "prove" that he was not late for school.)
- The Kipling Kid and his Cake Trolley of Justice – a tea boy with a secret identity as a superhero. Despite not actually having any powers, he foils a masked villain who turns out to be Barry White. White is sentenced to play a benefit concert so he can repay the townspeople; and spends over £100 on cake, to the delight of the Kipling Kid.
- Kiss and the Kingdom of the Robot Ants – A strip about the rock band Kiss travelling into the future to stop a colony of robotic ants by playing their music.
- Krystle's Big Chance – an American teenage girl bullied for having one very slightly crooked front tooth; until she goes to an orthodontist, whereupon her classmates award her prom queen and hail her as beautiful despite her now wearing huge, ungainly dental braces. A parody of Americans who aspire to orthodontics while stereotyping British people as having bad teeth.
- The Lager Lads – somewhat like the Real Ale Twats, these are a group of clean-cut, upstanding beer aficionados who like lager more than anything. Inevitably, barmen tell them to "piss off" or urinate in their beer. The Lads never seem to notice there's anything wrong with their drinks after this happens, both highlighting the weak flavour of lager compared to other beer and showing the Lads up to be idiots. The strips were inspired by a series of advertisements for McEwan's lager, in which – Chris Donald noted – a group of smiling, happy young men drink copious amounts of lager but never "got pissed or glassed anybody".
- Large-Breasted Wet T-shirt Pneumatic Drill Girl – A masked superheroine, dressed for a wet T-shirt contest, who works at the roadside with a pneumatic drill and fights crime.
- Larry Ladd and his Ambitious Dad – A boy whose father aggressively pushes him to become famous, forcing him to play different sports and try out for a drama school. When that fails, the father sells Larry to a producer who promises to make him a "film star"; unaware that it is for a company making pornographic snuff films.
- Last of the Armageddon Wine - a parody of Last of the Summer Wine where Compo, Clegg, and Foggy decide to build an atomic bomb and nuke the moor.
- Last Tan&Go in Powys – Bleak one-off strip about a young woman who develops an addiction to indoor tanning and subsequently dies from skin cancer after her friends make fun of her pale appearance. The title is a pun on Last Tango in Paris.
- Laurie Driver – the schizophrenic long-distance driver of an articulated lorry, who murders female hitchhikers and dumps their bodies by the roadside. Initially the strip focused on Laurie's serial killing, but later strips show him having other vices such as drinking on the job or involvement in people smuggling.
- Last-Minute Man – One-off strip where a man, despite having months to prepare, does not start Christmas shopping until 3:45pm on Christmas Eve resulting in him giving his family presents that he bought in a local garage.
- Lazy Disinterested [sic] 16-Year-Old Photo Shop Girl – a teenage girl who works in a local photo supply shop. She has a very unenthusiastic attitude and is unhelpful to her customers; preferring to chew bubblegum and text on her mobile phone for hours on end. Similar strips have the "Lazy Disinterested 16-Year-Old" working in a supermarket, a shoe shop and a chip shop – the latter seeing her rather talk to a friend (possibly her boyfriend) than serve anyone, and being extremely slow and deliberately uninterested when she does serve someone. Later strips have corrected the title to "Lazy Uninterested 16-Year-Old". Her equally unhelpful counterparts are sometimes featured, including "Ugly Miserable Butch Bus Driver Lady" and "34-Year-Old Obsessive War Workshop Assistant" (an older man so obsessed with role-playing games that when a boy tries to buy two sets of figures from different sets, he will only sell one or the other, but not both as they "are from different scenarios").
- Lenny Left – a one-off strip featuring a "radical" left-wing alternative comedian whose hackneyed "street theatre" routines about Thatcherism arouse complete non-interest from the public. Lenny eventually sells out, and the last frame of the strip shows him doing a sexist and homophobic stand-up routine in a Conservative club.
- Lent Larks with Pope Francis – a strip portraying Pope Francis as obsessed with British sweets (that in real life are obviously not sold in the Vatican) and trying to secretly get hold of them while fasting for Lent.
- Lidl Richard – A middle-aged man who goes shopping but always come back with useless junk, much to his wife's frustration.
- Little Big Daddy – A schoolboy who thinks he is 1970s wrestler Big Daddy.
- Little Old Man – A young boy who acts like a stereotypical elderly man and at the end of the strip ends up being taken to a retirement home. He was introduced as the counterpart of Playtime Fontayne, but, unlike Playtime, he has so far only been a one-off strip.
- Little Plumber – Spoof of Beano comic strip Little Plum, in which the American Indian is a jobbing plumber.
- Lonely Sidney Sidebottom – A one off strip from the early 1980s (also featured in The Big Hard One annual) about a single man who has difficulties talking to women.
- Lord Shite and Nanny No-Dumps – a one-off strip which draws upon the urban myth that the aristocracy do not poo. It's about an aristocrat who wishes to defecate "like common people" and his former nanny who is determined to stop him. After several rather blunt episodes the strip finishes with him locking Nanny in a cage and downing his pants, intending to have a 'really big smelly shite!' Unfortunately he has kept his load in his guts for so long that it has solidified into a big (and uninteresting) diamond, and Nanny is shown in fits of laughter!
- Lucky Frank – A young boy who seems to have bad luck turned into good luck. An earlier (and later revived) version of Spawny Get. His identical twin brother, Unlucky Frank (who has exceptionally bad luck) has also featured in his own strip.
- Luke O'Like – He is One – A strip about the titular character who gets mistaken for someone else.
- Lumberjack Veterinarian – A lumberjack takes on the duty of making people's pets better, only to get fired for murdering them.
- Luvvie Darling – a melodramatic and self-important thespian who is completely talentless. He presents himself as an A-list actor but is only offered very minor (and ultimately humiliating) roles. Darling is depicted as an exaggerated parody of old-school British Shakespearian stage actors: pompous, bombastic, profligate and pretentious in his use of literary quotes, and habitually referring to famous, real-life actors in familiar terms (such as "Dear old Larry" for Sir Laurence Olivier). Darling's name is a pun on the insincere and over-affectionate terms, "luvvie" and "darling" that actors and actresses are stereotyped as employing with each other. (for a good example see 'Absolutely Fabulous' starring Joanna Lumley and Jennifer Saunders)
  Each Viz episode begins with Luvvie "resting between jobs" – a showbiz term for being out of work. His manager Louie is as useless as himself, drives (very badly) in a big American car, smokes a huge cigar, and drinks from a bottle marked "Eau de Tap" (pig French for "Tap Water") – obviously unable to afford anything stronger. Darling is in his forties, dresses in a Hamlet-style period costume with embroidered tunic, frilled collar and cuffs, high boots and short ornamental cape. He has an Errol Flynn moustache and pointed goatee beard to offset his receding hairline. His appearance is based on stereotypical images of Shakespeare. Darling auditions constantly for roles which are often completely unsuited to him. In one strip a director casting for Romeo and Juliet was hard-put to convince Luvvie that the role of Romeo required a man half his age.
  Darling's ludicrous ham acting style and overbearing personality result in him gaining only bit (walk-on) parts at best; at worst, his only theatre employment is cleaning the theatre's toilets. In several episodes, Darling ends up having to perform in pornographic films, yet he often has trouble remembering his lines and so has the need for a prompt from a lowly stagehand. This is taken to its extreme when he gets to play a sheep in a nativity play put on by children - and has to have a prompt for the 'baaa'! In one episode, to his delight he is offered the "leading role" in "Cyrano de Bergerac" and goes all out to produce himself as the ideal leading man, complete with a huge nose. However, when he appears it turns out that the "role" he thought he was in is actually to play the opening "roll" on the kettledrum for the opening announcement. He passionately believes in promoting the cultural value of theatre, is ecstatic at any chance to show off his self-proclaimed (and utterly non-existent) acting talent (once even in a prison, where he comes (horribly) to grief). In another episode he is interviewed by "Michael Perkinson" (a blatant reference to another very famous interviewer) and with every question he reveals more and more how much of a total and utter failure he is.
- Mad Men Max – A "mash-up" of Mad Max and Mad Men, in which "Mad" Max Draper is a creative at a ruthless advertising agency touting for business in a post-apocalyptic wasteland.
- Major Misunderstanding – As his name suggests, he almost always misunderstands situations, and is seemingly unable to interpret incidents in their own context, instead viewing them through the prism of his own prejudices, typically centred on inter-war upper-class values. For example, he once believed that a blood donor van was a chip van, and berated the nurse operating the van for trying to bring "unwanted custom" (i.e. proles) to his "close-knit community". The Major has mistaken hooded monks for Asbos and vendors at a church fete for asylum seekers. He is apparently a retired major who dresses in the regimental blazer, cravat, slacks and has a bushy walrus moustache and proudly wears his medals on his chest for all to see; characteristics which suggest a very pompous individual. He walks with a stiff upper back, and displays signs of senility in his disregard of others opinions and actions. This satire of an old school gentleman soldier set in his ways emphasises his ranting against anything that he believes goes against his dearly held traditionalist right wing moral values. He reads the Daily Mail and is always drawn by the cartoonists with his fists tightly clenched at his waist. The major's personality and manner is similar to that of earlier Viz characters, including the early Billy Britain and Victorian Dad. He has never been shown with his family, and like Victorian Dad, is often presented as dogmatic, but ultimately as a hypocrite with no self-awareness or idea of his own position as a social relic.
- The Male Online – A middle-aged (as-yet unnamed) man who spends most his time in his study looking at and posting on the Daily Mail website. He always believes and endorses everything the Daily Mail says, often screaming an extended version of "GAAAAAAH" before ranting about health and safety, foreigners coming to Britain and other right-wing paranoia to his long-suffering wife Beryl, who will occasionally try and reason with him (always to no avail) but will inevitably just walk away exasperated. The Male will also spend his time on the website looking at (and often masturbating to) revealing photos of female celebrities with an appropriate comment ("Yes, she certainly is all grown up", "Ooh, you shouldn't go around in public like that!" etc.). A very recent episode has him on his (newly acquired) smartphone trying to refute Titus Appleton's party on Twitter; only to have his wife, after noting he has no followers (three zeros under his name!) reply on her cell, calling him a 'Dickhead', to the accompaniment of the usual 'GAAAAAAH!' One instance had him getting beaten up for challenging his neighbour's disability, believing he is committing benefit fraud.
- Mary Shitehouse - her house is a load of shite (024)
- Mawning, Noone, and Knight - Three women who work as private detectives, investigating murders through New Age methods such as crystals and feng shui.
- Max Power – a breakdown mechanic who, instead of repairing cars, rebuilds them into hot-rods. His name is a parody of Max Power magazine, which is aimed at people who are into "pimping" up cars.
- Maxwell Straker – Record Breaker. Maxwell spends most strips making increasingly futile attempts to appear in the Guinness World Records, only to end up in a bad situation where he inadvertently gets his wish: such as falling into the world's longest coma, getting the longest ever prison sentence, or breaking the record for "the world's daftest cunt".
- Max's Plank – Max is constantly plagued by pranks that are carried out by a simple plank, that always appears inanimate. Eventually he takes it to a factory to be made in to matchsticks. However, the matchsticks return to further plague him by ringing his doorbell. The title is a pun on physicist Max Planck.
- Meddlesome Ratbag – a series of strips featuring a pinch-faced, headscarf-wearing middle-aged woman (Mrs Ratbag). She takes great delight in delivering nagging lectures to complete strangers about minor breaches of social etiquette, and will go to extreme lengths to engineer a situation where she can make such a complaint. One strip began with her seeing a TV news item about the Rio de Janeiro carnival, whereupon she immediately flew to that city and booked a hotel room overlooking the carnival procession, purely in order to complain about the noise. Another strip was set during a minute's silence for a "some terrible tragedy or other" and saw her desperately (and unsuccessfully) trying to find someone who was breaking the silence, in order to remonstrate with them. She finally achieved her aim by breaking into a maternity ward and rebuking an exhausted birthing mother for the "disrespect" of failing to silence her newborn baby's cries. Another episode has her reading about NASA receiving radio transmissions from a planet many light-years away. She buys lengths of piping which she fits together and after a huge length is constructed it reaches for the alien planet. She uses it to bang on the planet with the shout, "Keep the noise down!"
- Melinda Text Messenger – A strip about a girl who likes to send text messages on her mobile phone.
- Metal Micky – A man who is a fan of heavy metal music and will go up to any musical group he encounters (such as a jazz orchestra or brass band) to request they play it for him.
- A Meter Inspector Calls – A satire on the 2021–present United Kingdom cost of living crisis. In a take on An Inspector Calls, the Inspector berates the Birling family as wasteful for normal energy usage, such as using a tumble drier (despite it being the middle of winter, when it's difficult to air-dry clothes) and even using the internet, which supposedly has a high carbon footprint. The strip ends with a sarcastic admonition that rising costs of living are always the public's fault.
- Mickey's Miniature Grandpa – a senile old man, convinced that he is four inches tall. This causes trouble for his grandson Mickey, whose mother refuses to acknowledge Grandpa's obvious insanity. Grandpa's delusion usually leads to him getting beaten up, involved in a fatal accident, injuring Mickey, or (in some cases) managing to convince others that he really is four inches tall. The strip is ostensibly a parody of Peter's Pocket Grandpa.
- Mickey's Monkey Spunk Moped – a motorised scooter which uses simian semen as fuel. In the character's first appearance, his moped runs out of simian love fuel a few panels into the story, and the story revolves around attempts to avail himself of fresh supplies so he can continue on his journey. In a final twist, Mickey eventually realises his monkey spunk moped is probably not the most practical means of transport, and so he exchanges it for a car which runs on leopard's fanny batter, which is not much easier to obtain. In a slight non-sequitur to the original storyline, Mickey and the Monkey Spunk Moped are reunited for the character's second appearance in the 197th (August 2010) issue of Viz, as the last cartoon in that issue. In this second story, Mickey decides to modify the moped to run on renewable energy, as he fears additional running costs of a government increase in fuel tax. Mickey made a third appearance in the November 2018 issue where he attempts to have the moped converted to electric power in order to reduce fuel emissions.
- Mickey the Martian – An early strip featured in Viz The Big Hard One annual, which features a martian consisting of a head with three eyes and one foot.
- Mike Smitt the Patronising Git – A strip about a man who goes around pestering everyone much to their annoyance.
- Millie Tant – A caricature of the militant feminist, Millie thinks of herself as a champion of "Wimmin's" rights but is often self-centred and dismissive of the feelings of others. She rants, raises her fist in the air and foams at the mouth. She often refers to men as "phallocrats" and "potential rapists" or just "rapists", referring to other women as "fellow lesbians" regardless of their actual orientation. Most of the storylines seem to indicate sexual frustration. She often complains that various phenomena are actually metaphors for the suppression of women: fireworks are actually "big explosive penises" that "skewer and rape the virgin female sky". She refuses to make a snowman, instead offering to make a snow-black-lesbian-rape-victim-in-a-wheelchair: she plays cards with an old woman and ends the game by calling her a homophobe because she said "straight flush". In the end she often forgets her feminist stance and is shown asking a man to get rid of a mouse while she is standing on a chair, or knitting baby clothes with a simper.
- Miranda's Heart – Carmen Miranda is a tasked with transporting a donor heart across town in time for a child's life-saving transplant surgery. The strip's title is a pun on the name of Miranda Hart.
- Miss Demeanour and her Concertina – A girl who tries to get up to antics with a concertina, only to find out said instrument is completely useless, so she gets a vacuum cleaner instead and changes the title of her strip to "Miss Demeanour and her Vacuum Cleaner" and whacks a policeman in the face.
- Mobile Dick – A man who refuses to put his phone down under any circumstances.
- Monarch of the Glen - An American billionaire buys a Scottish country estate where the British Royal Family lives wild on the grounds.
- Morbid O'Beesley – A very obese middle-aged man who pushes his wife to cook very unhealthy food for him, while commenting aloud about the damage it will do to his body.
- The Modern Parents – and their long-suffering children, Tarquin and Guinevere. The two, Malcolm and Cressida, are middle-class, left-wing, self-absorbed and sanctimonious, often waxing lyrical about issues such as environmentalism. Their two sons, Tarquin and Guinevere (who was given a girls' name as his parents did not want to conform to gender stereotypes) are more down-to-earth, with Tarquin often, usually unsuccessfully, trying to reason with his parents.
- Morris Day: Sexual Pervert – A moustachioed, jumper-wearing middle-aged man who is obsessed with pornography, ignoring his attractive wife who waits for him in their bedroom. The character is based upon soul star and Prince protege Morris Day.
- Mr. "Eating" Charlesworth – An early strip featured in The Big Hard One annual, which features a gluttonous man who eats too much.
- Mr Jimmynail - A strip portraying Jimmy Nail in the style of the Mr Men characters (while everyone else around him is drawn as a normal human.) He is constantly irritated by people associating him with Spender or offering him work he considers too similar to Spender - apart from someone who mistakes him for Bernard Hill.
- Mr Logic – ("such is my name, therefore one may infer that this strip is in some way about me") – a serious and humourless young man with no real empathy for other people. He uses highly technical and over-elaborate language rather than straightforward speech and takes everything people say to him literally. The strip usually ends with Logic becoming the victim of his misunderstandings with others. Mr. Logic was inspired by Chris Donald's own brother, Steve, who was much later diagnosed with Asperger's syndrome. Early versions of the character used the monikers "doodle duck dandy" and Hello World before arriving on Mr Logic.
- Mr Post, the Happy Families Careers Advisor - a careers advisor who can only direct people to jobs based on their surname, in the style of the card game Happy Families.
- Mr Rudewords – a one-off strip about a man with coprolalia, who shouts allegedly rude words such as "toilet seats!" at socially inappropriate times.
- Mrs Brady Old Lady – Iconic and long-time strip about an old woman who spends all her time exaggerating her age and complaining about young people of today and how things were different in her time. Mrs Brady constantly talks about her ailments; she is forgetful, inattentive, bigoted while always referring to her youth and how life was so much simpler and clear back then. She could also be seen as an object of pathos, she typically misunderstands what other people are telling her and so appears as rude, spiteful and self-absorbed – when a friend of hers is dying she seems unable to notice and only talk about her own ailments. In one episode she completely fails to realise that the friend she is talking to has been dead for over a year, and the corpse is decomposing horribly in front of the heater. Mrs Brady's full name is Ada Florence Agnes Pankhurst Brady. She is widowed and often fondly refers to her late husband, Sidney (however, according to a game on the Viz website that featured Mrs Brady shoplifting (something she did very often in the early strips) Sidney is not dead – he just left her because he "couldn't stand the old cow" and moved to Carlisle). She is often portrayed as being a hypocrite as in most episodes complains about how immoral the modern world is and how values have gone down, while also talking of happy memories of doing the same sort of things herself in her youth because "you had to in them days". She is a hypochondriac, and particularly obsessed with her bowel movements. During a "convention" strip where multiple characters met each other in an anniversary issue Postman Plod was surprised by Mrs Brady who revealed herself to be an intelligent and witty lady, who was "just playing a part".
- Mrs Cedd, Her Anthony's Dead – a bereaved mother who constantly grieves for her dead son Anthony. When her husband points out that she herself murdered Anthony, she kills him too and then publicly bemoans being a widow.
- Mrs Clean – a woman obsessed with having a clean house. In most strips she ends up killing or mutilating her children to keep them from making a mess in the house (e.g. stuffing and mounting them; or flaying them alive after hearing that dust mites live in skin particles). This strip appeared in several other comics around the same time.
- Mrs Maybe and her Crazy Baby – strips about a fat lady called Mrs Maybe, who makes suggestions to her baby on such matters as to where to go out to: the baby's usual response is "Let's fuck a coppa!" Very similar in premise to Rude Kid from the same comic.
- My Mother's a Whore – about a young boy named Percy Peach whose mother is an escort. When Percy is reprimanded at school for saying his mother is a whore, she comes into the school to prove she really is. The headmaster invites her to give a careers talk, and now all Percy's classmates want to be in the sex industry.
- My Workfare Lady – a young woman horribly exploited on a workfare scheme until she finally snaps and walks out. The unscrupulous employer, undeterred, cheerfully phones the local authorities to accuse her of walking out having stolen stuff while under drugs, have her child taken into care and request an attractive female replacement. Considerable overtones of 'We...' and 'Fixed-Odds Betty' (which see)
- Nan Dare – a strip in which Dan Dare is asked to take care of his senile grandmother for the day, but forced to bring her on an urgent mission into space to rescue an alien ambassador. The villain never shows up, as he has been delayed by his grandmother.
- The Nancy Boys – a parody of The Hardy Boys where a pair of boy detectives go around causing trouble for innocent people (such as getting a homeless man arrested for vagrancy.)
- Nanny Macnee – a parody of Nanny McPhee in which Patrick Macnee is hired as a nanny for a family's young children. With the help of Emma Peel, he convinces Interpol that the whole family are dangerous terrorists whose DVD player is actually a weapon of mass destruction. The father and his children are arrested, while Macnee and Peel celebrate with champagne.
- Nash Gordon – a futuristic benefits cheat who eventually gets found out when he goes to the benefits office planet instead of a driving range as a result of a dodgy sat-nav.
- Nobby's Piles – a very long-running strip featuring a man with incredibly bad haemorrhoids. He continually finds himself stricken by situations beyond his control which exacerbate the situation horribly!
- Norbert Colon – an old miser. In one strip, Colon shared top billing with hopeless ventriloquist Boswell Boyce ("he throws his voice") and wound up in a lunatic asylum; in another strip he went on a blind date only to find the dating agency had fixed him up with his own mother ("Oh turds! It's that tightwad son of mine!"), a dead ringer for Norbert only wearing a (clearly labelled) NHS wig. One strip featured a parody of A Christmas Carol involving his ancestor Ebenezer Colon, who is exactly like him; suggesting Norbert's miserly ways are hereditary. (026, 027)
- Norman the Doorman – a strip about a violent doorman named Norman who works at the cinema, and then can be found in the most inopportune places such as a funeral, challenging everyone who attempts to enter. He even appears as a 'Santa's Elf' at one point, refusing entrance to a little boy and his father, before turning on Santa himself, fists flying as he shouts "Who let you in here with a hat on, sunshine?"
- Norman's Knob – the puerile tale of Norman, who thinks if he rubs his brass doorknob that he keeps in his pocket, magic things will happen to him. Norman rubs his doorknob a lot at inappropriate moments and indeed things do happen for him – in the form of arrests from irate policemen.
- Nosferatu, Driving Instructor – a vampire who works night shifts as a driving instructor. At the end of the strip he is killed with a stake by a vampire hunter, who promptly offers to take over as the student's new instructor.
- Nude Motorcycle Girl – a heroic female biker who solves crimes – naked except for a crash helmet, bikini pants and motorcycle boots.
- Nudge Dredd – a single-shot parody of an overenthusiastic (and grossly overweight) security guard who ridiculously patrols a seaside amusement arcade, harassing customers over minor infringements and otherwise making a nuisance of himself but treated as a hero. Based on 2000 AD's 'Judge Dredd' character.
- The Numnuts – A parody of the Beano comic, the Numskulls.
- Odd Job Bob-a-Job Bob – A boy who does unusual tasks for his neighbours in return for one shilling ("bob")
- On Das Buses – A slightly dark parody of the 1970s sitcom On the Buses where both the driver (Hitler) and conductor (unknown, but bearing a resemblance to Himmler) who addresses the Hitler-figure as 'Mein Stan' tend to kill passengers who do not agree with them. Various wartime characters appear (Stalin and Churchill) driving other buses and picking up non-Aryan passengers – one a very obvious orthodox Jew – which finally give the Nazis enough fury to commit suicide! In another episode the two are driving in a blizzard which gets steadily worse. Two of the passengers want to get off, and are executed by Hitler, who then proclaims they will push on 'to final victory', but then is informed by Himmler that they are out of fuel. They all freeze to death.
- One Cut Wally – a gents' barber who gives all his customers exactly the same haircut even when they asked for something else.
- One Day at the Car Hire - a family are vastly overcharged by an unscrupulous car hire company when they want to rent a car for their holiday.
- One Man and his God – A one off strip featuring a shepherd praying to God to round up the sheep by striking thunder and lightning at them.
- Only Fools and Norses – a Viking-themed parody of the BBC comedy Only Fools and Horses.
- Orson Cart, He Comes Apart – A kid who can remove his body parts thanks to once receiving a blast of radioactivity.
- Our Neighbours are Bastards – a man (later his wife after he dies of heart failure) who makes his neighbours' life hell by complaining about their behaviour (which it appears he has created himself in order to have some to complain about).
- Out Comes Stanley – a cheerful old man who slashes people with a Stanley knife at the most trivial of provocation (issue 124)
- Outcast of the Pony Ballet School – a parody of the comic strips in the 1970s/1980s style of teenage girl's magazine such as Pony School and Bunty, in which Steve McFadden, for no apparent reason, attends a private school for girls where all his classmates are eleven or twelve years old. The wealthy students bully him for being poor and having a shabby-looking pony, until it is discovered at the end of the story that he is really a princess. The title may be based on "Outcast of the Pony School", a real comic strip which ran in the girls' comic Bunty.

== P–S ==
- Page 3 School – An all-teenage-girl school where the students are required to attend topless (much to the arousal of all men they encounter, with the exception of their male teachers). They are often inspected at the gate by a teacher to ensure their nipples are erect and up to school standard. They later compete in a polo game against a rival girls' school who instead go full nude. As the title implies, the strip parodies topless female posers who appeared on the 3rd page of various tabloid newspapers, particularly The Sun. And, like their pictures, the comic strip was printed on the third page of the issue it was published in.
- The Parkie – An extremely angry, to say nothing of cruel and sadistic, park keeper who extremely viciously abuses people that seem like they are breaking park rules, when in fact they are not – he even creates his own rules just so that he can abuse them. Early strips carried satirical introductions like "Totally Dodgy Cartoons Present..." and "A social comment (why not?)". He has also infiltrated several other strips.
- Pat-a-Cake Pete – a boy in World War II who is recruited by the British Government to deliver spy messages iced onto cakes.
- Pathetic Sharks – (sometimes called the Crap Sharks). An occasional strip featuring a group of sharks, much feared not for their ferocity, but their mind-numbingly boring and pathetic behaviour and conversational style. Instead of hunting for prey, they ask people on the beach for crisps, ice cream and toffee, except for one shark who claims to be "lactose intolerant". Generally the strip consists of some sort of shipwreck or holiday-by-the-seaside theme; the initial apprehension at the sighting of shark fins turns into abject horror: "Oh no! Crap sharks!". In one strip a group of WWII shipwreck survivors blow themselves up with a hand grenade rather than face the Crap Sharks.
- Paul Chandler, Baggage Handler – A thieving and incompetent airport baggage handler.
- Paul Whicker, the tall vicar – A deliberately crudely drawn cartoon of a misanthropic vicar. In one strip, he commits insurance fraud to maintain church funds by gambling (which he then appropriates for his own use). He is often challenged by his superior, Bishop Bloggs, who tries to thwart Whicker's schemes. At one point, he is about to be arrested by police only to tell the bishop and the arresting officer that he won a bet on the horses and the parish funds are five thousand pounds up as a result. Although amoral, Whicker has ironically been known to expose the hypocrisy of his superiors. Especially as Whicker uses "missionary work" as an excuse for drug trafficking after being shunted from parish to parish, covering up his misdeeds (sleeping with the bishop's wife and daughter). He has even been known to have connections to corrupt officials, such as a customs officer. One early strip has a frame with a skinhead and media studies lecturer sitting on the bench where Whicker plans on getting drunk. The media studies lecturer gives his thoughts on the strip as an indictment of pious hypocrisy, whereas the skinhead thinks he is "A fuckin' magic violent Vikka (sic)". Another one-off character is Pat Berger, the Fat Verger. At some point, Whicker is made a bishop as he is seen drinking with Roger Mellie following Roger's rather dreadful attempt to present a religious programme having subsequently got drunk on communion wine and relieved himself in the church font.
- PC Blouse – a police officer who is ineffective at his job because he is weak and cowardly and is also not taken seriously by the public.
- PC Hopper, Bent Copper – a corrupt police officer who often takes bribes and is frequently shown beating a confession out of a suspect.
- PC Plod – a police officer who carries a woven bag, wears sandals and is more concerned with the criminal's human rights than arresting them.
- PC Rea – The Cop That's Queer – A one off strip about a homosexual police officer.
- PC Victor Foxtrot – The Strictly No Nonsense Copper – A one off strip about a corrupt policeman who causes harm to various members of the public, such as swearing at elders and confiscating children's playthings.
- Percy Posh – Early strip featuring a boy bullied by Biffa Bacon. He seems to have been replaced by Cedric Soft in later strips.
- Pete's Portable Prison – A one off strip about a boy called Pete Pentonville who owns a prison cell on wheels and attempts to stop the antics of the bully known as Sneaky Simpson.
- Peter Kayveman – A one off strip about Peter Kay as a caveman telling prehistoric jokes.
- Peter Pretend – A one off strip about a boy who pretends to do things, such as faking illnesses and getting struck by a car.
- Peter the Slow Eater – a man who, as the title suggests, takes his time eating meals much to the frustration of his family, especially his kids whom he will not allow to leave the table "until everyone has finished eating". Another scenario has him with two mates in the pub (as a slow drinker) insisting on buying a round when his pint is untouched, and letting everyone else get served before him, much to the frustration of his drinking buddies (who discreetly drink his pint and order two pints for themselves without looking and by the time he gets back to the table they have gone).
- The Phantom of Fairpools - A one off strip about a Dad and his young son on a fishing trip. The son gives money to a drunk who gives him his mostly empty beer can in return and slinks away. Out on the lake, the Dad inexplicably attacks the bottom of their small boat with a claw hammer as his son cheers him on. When water comes into the boat through the hole, the father and son are saved when they use the empty beer can as a makeshift bung. Safely back on land, they are unable to find the drunk. They chance on a visiting scientist who is unable to explain the mystery of the Phantom of Fairpools.
- Phil's Spectre – A strip about a young boy who believes he can see a "ghost", in reality an escaped convict hiding underneath a white sheet. The strip is very similar in premise to Zip O'Lightning (see below). The title appears to be a pun on Phil Spector's name and possibly parodies Bobby's Ghoul from Whizzer and Chips.
- The Pie-Eyed Piper – A parody of The Pied Piper of Hamelin where the titular piper is so drunk he even makes the rats get drunk.
- Piers, Mears, and Tears for Fears - Piers Morgan and Ray Mears fight over the last ticket to a Tears for Fears concert - only to end up in the wrong venue, watching "Gere and his Four Keirs" (Richard Gere with four performing clones of Sir Keir Starmer.)
- The Pirates of Ben's Pants – A one-off strip featuring a young boy named Benjamin whose underpants are home to a crew of miniature pirates (the name being an obvious play on The Pirates of Penzance).
- Playtime Fontayne – a middle-aged bank clerk who lives with his Mum and behaves like a primary school-aged child. He made his first appearance in the comic along with his opposite "Little Old Man", a more short-lived character of a young boy who acts like the stereotype of an elderly man. Often the other members of the bank are also portrayed as children, especially when their boss is away sick. Word play on Fine Time Fontayne
- The Pointless Cunt of St. Bridget's – A story in the style of Bunty and similar comics, in which three girls at an exclusive boarding school find Eamonn Holmes on the grounds and decide to keep him as a stray pet, until their headmistress convinces them it's kinder to release him into the wild at a TV studio.
- Poorly Designed Evil Robot Sent from the Future To Kill All Mankind – which fails to complete its mission because it can't find a plug socket to recharge itself
- Pop Shot – Real name: Gerald. A man who is almost always naked, although not showing anything – he always 'fig-leaf's' himself – sporting a stereotypical 1970s pornstar moustache, afro and chest hair, who always finds himself accidentally slipping into the language of a porn film while performing everyday activities, much to the annoyance of his wife. The strip always ends with his wife spontaneously having sex with a complete stranger, with Gerald left out of the proceedings.
- Pope-eye the Pontiff Man – A parody of Popeye the Sailor depicted as the pope.
- Pope Benedict the Dodger – A parody of Roger the Dodger featuring Pope Benedict XVI.
- Poppy Bullshit and Araminta Bollocks, Art Makers – Two women who try and create modern forms of art from basic situations but always fail through lack of foresight – for example they set up a trap to lure a mouse, which turns out to be a rat.
- Posh Street Kids – A parody of the Bash Street Kids from The Beano. In this one-off strip, these schoolkids annoy their teacher by leaving their butlers lying about in the playground, smoking high-priced Cuban cigars behind the bike shed and having food fights in the canteen with caviar, strawberries and champagne. In the end, they do get dealt with, but they craftily prevent painful canings on their backsides by slipping thick literary works of art "worth thysands of pynds" down the backs of their trousers, though the teacher seems not to notice the extra padding as he administers their punishment.
- Postman Plod, "The Miserable Bastard" – a mean-spirited postman with a serious attitude problem and a highly questionable work ethic. Plod is bone idle and lethargic and frequently takes extended periods off work with questionable excuses that only hold water because they are supported with notes from his doctor who is just lazy as he is. The pair of them often concoct some excuse for time off work so that they can go and play golf. Whenever he turns up for work at all Plod is completely lacking in any work ethics, and often enjoys opening and reading the post he is meant to be delivering. He is not even bothered about hiding this activity, and after reading someone's bank statement, either mocking or embarrassing that person for their poor financial situation (another example is when he exposes a resident's arrival of brown-enveloped "jazz mags" to the whole street). The other post office staff are also shown to be lazy and dissatisfied with their jobs and spend most of the time sitting and playing cards (with the exception of the post office manager who tries desperately in vain to run a tight ship). In the lead up to Christmas once, Plod and all his fellow postmen opened up all the parcels at the sorting office and stole whatever they wanted to save having to buy their own presents. On one occasion he even just threw all the post he was meant to deliver in a hedge and went home early. In another Christmas feature he took part in the poem 'The Night Mail' (This is the Night Mail, crossing the border, bringing the cheque and the postal order...) which was specially re-written for him, and displayed his uselessness, heartlessness and ruthlessness for all to see. He was eventually chucked off the train and the final frame had him, drunk and lying in the snow, wishing the reader a 'Merry <hic> Christmas'!
- The Princess Who Would be King – a strip portraying Mervyn King as a fairytale princess who secretly wants to be the Governor of the Bank of England.
- Professor Fuck – The weekly professor who answers awful questions, supposedly submitted by readers.
- Professor Piehead – an inventor of amazing inventions which always go wrong and normally kill the Professor or his lab assistant, Tim (whom the Professor always addresses as Joe, for unknown reasons of his own).
- Public Information Phil - two boys (Phil, an older boy and Tony, a younger boy - the boy in the Charley Says PIFs) talking about going off and doing dangerous things which many public information films in the 1970s warned them not to do, such as going off with strangers, playing with fireworks and playing around electricity substations.
- Puce and Pasty – two detectives with heart disease, who try to investigate crime despite frequently passing out or having heart attacks because of their illness.
- Quentin Tarranteeny – a parody portraying Quentin Tarantino as an extremely foul-mouthed baby who speaks as if delivering a monologue in one of Tarantino's films.
- Question Mime – a mime artist using his act to ask questions during a political debate.
- Raffles, the Gentleman Thug – in which the central character is a 19th-century nobleman given to 'immense erudition and wanton violence'. Raffles inhabits the formal world of the Victorian/Edwardian gentleman, but behaves as a 21st-century hooligan, though he always maintains his elegant style. The comic strip parodies British yob culture, placing Raffles in anachronistic modern situations which he usually employs extreme violence to resolve. Raffles is always accompanied by his loyal friend Bunny (Lord Bunniford) and has other acquaintances such as 'Dave, 6th Earl of Bermondsey' (a notorious section of South East London) and Clarence, 3rd Earl of Burberry (a reference to Burberry, stereotypically the fashion brand of choice for Britain's 'chavs').Raffles' character is a parody of E. W. Hornung's Raffles the Thief. The Raffles strip is noted for its substitution of formal language in common slang phrases. Raffles found himself in many situations featuring famous characters and events from the 19th century and early 20th century.
- Rainbrow – a violent and adult-themed parody of Rainbow (minus Geoffrey) that sees an abusive Zippy and gullible Bungle meet with kidnappers to pay for George's ransom. During the exchange, Zippy upon learning how meager the ransom was, boasts how he and the gang are worth far more than what the kidnappers wanted, causing them to then kidnap and ransom him to a reluctant George and Bungle.
- Randall and Diana (Deceased) – a controversial one-off parody of Randall and Hopkirk (Deceased) with Diana, Princess of Wales taking the place of Hopkirk to become "the people's ghost private detective". She and Randall investigate the claims of a man who believes his wife is having an affair, only to discover that the woman is in fact selling landmines to Africa; at which Diana promises "Dead or alive, I'm determined to put a stop to it." The strip attracted press controversy because of the real Diana's then-recent death.
- Randy Old Dog – A strip about a dog called Jeremy who copulates with a human leg, but when he sees his wife (who is another human leg), he tries to explain what happened, only to copulate with a blow-up doll of a human leg.
- Rat Boy – a pre-teen repeat offender and drug addict, characterised by a permanent "tail" of excrement protruding from his backside – his every strip involves burglary, vandalism, assault and/or substance abuse, with minimal reprisals by the police because he is a child. He is the brother of Tasha Slappa. The inspiration of his character is from that of the real-life career criminal, Tommy Laws, who was nicknamed Spiderboy by the police and the media due to his habitual climbing onto roofs and high places in order to evade capture. Most of his adventures involve breaking and entering, vandalising a place and taking anything of value, then usually either evading the law, or getting off very lightly. When arrested at one house which he ransacked he is sent on a "self-esteem building for young offenders" programme, which turns out to be a holiday in Spain. After another crime spree, he is put on trial by remote TV link to a detention cell (intended to be less traumatic than a courtroom trial); the kindly judge allows him to go free, whilst Rat Boy has already escaped through a sewer, somehow taking the TV with him, and is busy selling it as a stolen good. He was once subject to house arrest, enforced by electronic tagging on his ankle – unable to remove the tag, he gnaws his own leg off (like a real rat would) and hops outside to quickly rob several more houses. (Needless to say, his loss of limb is forgotten in subsequent comics.) He even once managed to steal the Crown Jewels. In another episode he stole an old cruise ship used as a floating nightclub off the Newcastle coast and abandoned it (burnt-out and balanced on bricks, like a stolen car) in Amsterdam, where he got arrested for seeking drugs and underage sex. His punishment, ironically, was to be used as a lab rat in a drugs testing clinic, which he found delightful...
- Ravy Davey Gravy – a young man into rave culture who breaks out into strange dances whenever he hears any kind of repetitive everyday noises, including car alarms and road drills, and even, at one point, a friend who had consumed an obviously badly-made Spanish Paella, defecating with considerable noise. His name possibly derives from Wavy Gravy.
- Raymond Porter and his Bucket of Water – a boy who carries around a bucket of water which he uses to solve all sorts of problems. It appeared only in early episodes of the comic and may have been shelved to make way for the similarly themed "Felix and his Amazing Underpants".
- Raymond the Large Caterpillar – A one off strip from the early 1980s about a caterpillar who takes up all the panels of the comic.
- Real Ale Twats – three rather pompous men, of whom only one has lines, speaking in an affected style. They only drink real ale, and the speaker even going so far as to keep extensive "reviews" of all the real ales that they have supped, along with the ABV (alcohol content) of the ale, the place where he supped and the name of the barman. This often branches into other items, such as if he was beaten up or had a glass in the face. He is also known to criticise lager drinkers. A parody of the Campaign for Real Ale (CAMRA). Many times, his boring speeches, or his attitude to those around them result in dreadful injuries. It is also made clear that in some cases they are not made welcome when they enter a pub (one barmaid saying, "Oh God!" when seeing them) likely due to their previous behaviour when they have been there. Often, they will enter a full bar, only to be shown in the next frame that the bar has emptied completely. Several times they have been seduced into trying something stronger, like a small measure of home-brewed whisky, which has the effect of turning the speaker extremely belligerent and causing much mayhem, which is imbued with a certain irony given the tendency of the speaker to extol the virtues of sensible, sociable drinking, of which he considers himself to be a shining example. The speaker is known to engage in pedantry on various other topics such as steam locomotives or Star Trek. He is also divorced and is shown to reside in a bedsit.
- Restless Spirit – A strip about a ghost who tries to get some sleep, but various noises keep waking him up.
- Retired Chemistry Teacher – a retired science teacher (as the name suggests) who refuses to believe that one of his former pupils has become a qualified pharmacist – believing that he is being dishonest about his professional standing.
- Reverend Milo's Lino Rhino – a vicar who travels around on a rhinoceros distributing rolls of linoleum and "converting" carpet users.
- Reverend Ramsden's Ringpiece Cathedral – A strip about a vicar who claims to have a church up his bottom.
- Rex Box – A boy convinced he is living in a video game.
- Robbie on the Run – A story in the style of Oliver Twist, where a plucky young orphan boy runs away from a foster mother who is using him as "slave labour" (in reality, a perfectly ordinary and kind woman who simply asked him to help clear the table after dinner). He ends up foiling robbers, and being congratulated by a policeman, who actually turns out to be both his parents in disguise under a costume.
- Robbie's Robot Carer – An infirm old man whose regular caregiver is replaced by a robot after cutbacks to public health services.
- Robin Hood and his Merrie Men – Robin Hood plays an overpriced, obviously rigged 'bow-and-arrow' game at a funfair because Maid Marion insists that he win a stuffed toy for her. There is considerable argument, and at the end he is arrested by the Sheriff's guards. The strip ends with an 'on the brink' which is never resolved.
- Robin Hood and Richard Littlejohn – Richard Littlejohn joins Robin Hood on a mission to rescue Maid Marion, while complaining about the gay agenda plotting to take over Sherwood Forest.
- Robot Nun (She's Got Tommy-Gun Tits!) – She bursts into a service being held in a church in outer space, and massacres the congregation with automatic weapons firing through her nipples.
- Rod Hull and Emo – A one-off strip parodying Rod Hull and Emu, in which Emu becomes Emo, a stereotypically maudlin emo fan.
- Rodney Rix – He Does Tricks With Bricks – A strip about a boy who throws bricks into windows, sets them down on the ground so people trip over them, and throws one up in the air, calls the police and has the brick drop on a policeman's head.
- Roger Irrelevant ("He's Completely Hatstand") – a young man with a very strange mental problem where he continually produces irrelevant and surreal streams of language and behaviour. In one strip, Roger throws a lamp from the roof of a house after a long, impassioned (and obviously unsuccessful) plea for the lamp not to commit suicide. On another occasion he decides to elope with an armchair, declaring it is pregnant with his children. Another time sees him disrupting the funeral of a relative by dragging the corpse out of the coffin and – employing a Brooklyn accent and emulating a character from a Mickey Spillane novel – aggressively questioning the deceased about some stolen goods. His parents seem to be very understanding and merely politely request that he stops his behaviour. These are the only times that Roger manages to show any sign of interaction with real people, although usually it is only in the form of saying things like "wibble wibble". (Dictionary.com attributes this nonsense-word to Roger; see External Links below.) "Frisnit" and "z'goft" are two of Roger's other favourite words.
- Roger Mellie ("The Man on the Telly – who says 'Bollocks!'") – a foul-mouthed, perverted, corrupt and violent TV presenter, whose activities satirise real TV shows and incidents. His on-screen greeting was originally 'Hello, Good Evening and Welcome' but soon degenerated to 'Hello, Good Evening and Bollocks'! Starred in a spinoff cartoon, voiced by Peter Cook. He has in recent years lent his name to Roger's Profanisaurus, a book which purportedly lists all the obscenities used in the English-speaking world. The work is updated in every issue of Viz, and periodically reprinted under various risqué titles. See link for more information.
- Roger the Lodger – a parody of the Beano character Roger the Dodger. A young schoolboy who rings a landlady's doorbell, arranges to rent a room in her house, and then congratulates himself on his "great lodge."
- The Adventures of Rolf Harris the Cat – A one-off strip which features a Scottish Rolf Harris in feline form attempting to deliver a package and avoid water-based hazards, only to find the package was a diver's watch.
- Ronnie Barker In Heaven – A strip depicting Ronnie Barker in Heaven where a shopkeeper (looking suspiciously like Ronnie Corbett) constantly "misunderstands" Barker's requests in the style of the Four Candles sketch. Barker is so irritated by this that he decides to go to Hell instead, but ends up stuck in a queue behind the Devil who is arguing with an identical shopkeeper.
- Roswell Stiles and his Intriguing X-Files – a one-off strip centred on a character named Roswell who wears glasses and carries a cabinet of "X-Files" and attempts to search for phenomena such as falling fish, spontaneous human combustion, crop circles, UFOs, big cats etc. but has no success; such as mistaking a kitten standing next to a Bonsai tree for an alien big cat winding up in the seals' enclosure at the zoo and many others. When he attempts to fake a UFO sighting by throwing an old car wheel trim into the air, it smashes another man's green house, who shoves the filing cabinet up Roswell's bottom. Roswell is a reference to a US town with a notorious UFO conspiracy.
- Rotating Chin Men – A gang of flying villains with jetpacks whose intention is to spoil Queen Elizabeth II's coronation by squirting semen onto her via a pump squeeze mechanism linked to their revolving chins. Paraphrased quote by the Archbishop of Canterbury: "I can't crown a queen with all jizz matted in her hair, it would be most unconstitutional". The villains are foiled by the two child heroes who hook one of the villains' rotating chin with the archbishop's crook, causing the mechanism to overheat and "dribble jissom all down his chin". (067)
- Roy'll Watch – two men (one middle aged, one elderly who wears a Union Flag suit and top hat) who are so obsessed with the royal family they will camp out for weeks on end to catch sight of even a minor Royal. Originally titled Roy'll Watch EIIR but changed after the death of Queen Elizabeth II. The name may be a loose play on long-running US TV shows 'Bay Watch' and 'ER'.
- Roy Schneider – Joy Rider – A 14-year-old perpetual truant yob whose attempts to cause trouble in his community usually end up with him looking ridiculous. For example, he twocs a car, looks in the rear-view mirror, and expresses delight that the police are chasing him already; in the next frame it is revealed that both Roy's car and the "pursuing" police car are models on a fairground ride, from which Roy is summarily ejected by the operator.
- Roy Wood – Initially titled Roy Wood Is Watching You. A spoof of George Orwell's Nineteen Eighty-Four and the 1973 hit I Wish It Could Be Christmas Everyday for which Wood was writer and lead vocalist. In a dystopian world, Wood has become dictator and ruthlessly enforces his wish. A telemarketer faces a tedious life of compulsory office parties and turkey dinners every single day, while being harshly punished for infractions such as regifting Secret Santa presents or mentioning New Year.
- Rubber Johnny – A strip about a boy with an elastic body. The name is also old slang for a condom.
- Ruby Mary and her Arse of Fire – A strip about a girl who eats too much Indian food.
- Rude Kid – one-frame strip where a young boy answers the most polite request with a rude word or phrase, such as his mother saying "Are you looking forward to the Eurovision Song Contest, son?" and he replies with "Granny's pubes, y'whore!". This comic actually predates Viz, featuring in some of the proto-Viz fanzines created by Donald in the 1970s.
- Saint Bernard Manning – A one off strip depicting comedian Bernard Manning as a dog who tells jokes instead of saving a mountain climber.
- Sam, Son of Man – a young boy who believes himself to be the second (or third) coming and moves in a mysterious way.
- Sammy and his Stammer – A strip from the early 1980s issues of Viz (and later featured in The Big Hard One annual) in which the titular character has a speech impediment and ends the strip by swearing.
- The Scaffolders Were Bastards – a group of construction workers who solicit an old lady for a contract to renovate the front of her beautiful thatched cottage; but when they get the job are extremely rude, aggressive and deliberately careless in their work, further adding to the cost. The strip ends with the house collapsing because of their negligence.
- The Scandi-Noir Adventures of ABBA – A strip about the members of ABBA investigating the disappearance of bookcases inside a branch of IKEA. They eventually discover that Björk is responsible because she is jealous that Iceland does not have a thriving furniture industry.
- Schools – One-off strips featuring a school where the students have the same thing in common, e.g. Page 3 School pupils are all well-known Page 3 girls or Euro School pupils are all stereotypes of various European nationalities.
- Scooter Dolphin Boy – A young boy who travels around on a kick scooter, solving crime with the help of his dolphin friend. The strip ends with him failing to catch the crooks, ending up in hospital, and being arrested for cruelty to the dolphin.
- Scottie Trotter and his Tottie Allotment – A boy with a portable miniature garden with several scantily-clad women on it.
- Scum Mothers, Who'd 'Ave 'Em? – Occasional strip created by Barney Farmer and Lee Healey (also responsible for the Drunken Bakers, George Bestial, Hen Cabin and We...), in which a young middle-class couple are continually embarrassed by the husband's drunken, foul-mouthed mother and her various thuggish boyfriends. The title is a play on Some Mothers Do 'Ave 'Em but the roles from that iconic programme are reversed.
- Scurvy Dogg – A one off strip about rapper Snoop Dogg losing his teeth because of a vitamin C deficiency.
- The Secret Life of Walter Shitty – One-off strip (parodying the movie of a similar name) about a lowly office worker named Walter who constantly fantasises about defacating on the desks of his enemies.
- Sex Toy Story – A parody of Toy Story, depicting Sheriff Woody as a dildo and Buzz Lightyear as a new vibrator called Buzz Lightspeed.
- Sheila Sherry – A girl who has two bowls of trifle in place of breasts.
- Sheridan Poorly – An occasional strip of a man convinced that he is terminally ill, even though he is constantly being told by doctors that there is nothing wrong with him. The character's name references Sheridan Morley.
- Sherlock Homeless – the street-homeless main character is a parody of Sherlock Holmes who solves crimes for the reward money – which is inevitably spent on Tennents Super.
- Sherlock Homo – an outrageously gay version of Sherlock Holmes. Despite the clear lack of justification for searching them, he employs various ruses to have well-built men stopped and searched in order to investigate their backsides, sighing "some day my prince will come".
- Shirker Bee – A once-only strip featuring a worker bee within a hive who is unusually lazy, feigning illness and quoting bizarre contractual details to get out of doing his job.
- Shitty Dick – a man with a difficult medical condition, wherein he expels impossibly large stools whenever he interacts with a vicar. The humour of the strip usually revolves around him explaining away the turds, often disguising them as something else (a snowman, a large Easter egg, etc.)
- Shoe Shop Sale Wars - two rival shoe shop owners compete to get the most famous celebrities to launch their sales. One thinks he's won after paying millions of pounds to secure an appearance from Clint Eastwood, but is defeated when the other manages to hire Beyoncé and Kanye West.
- Sid the Sexist – This iconic strip which has featured in almost all copies of Viz since it began, features a young man with no sexual experience who boasts of his success with women. His distinct lack of tact or any social graces do not help him in his quest to "pull" women – and indeed he has no idea of how to react with the fairer sex! Starred in a spinoff cartoon. Follow the link for a full description.
- Sigmund Fraud – a "psychiatrist" called Dr Sigmund (evidently based on Sigmund Freud) is actually an impostor who has no qualifications; overcharges his clients; and is committing welfare fraud by claiming unemployment benefit while working.
- Silvio Berlusconi's Jaffa Cake Bunga-Bungalow – surreal strip in which Silvio Berlusconi owns a giant Jaffa Cake converted into a one-storey house, which he uses to hold wild sex parties.
- Sir Patrick Moore – A strip about Sir Patrick Moore using a telescope to look up into the sky but ends up looking at people's bottoms instead.
- Simon Lotion, Time and Motion man – a hopeless male parent who insists his family reorganise every mundane household and leisure activity to fit his "professional", pedantic view of how the world should be run more efficiently. This always results in the complete failure of the proposed activity to meet any kind of performance or time constraint, with pathetic yet humorous consequences, once even ending up at the beach on the sand with the family...in the night! He still tried to reorganise them on the beach and the last frame had him still desperately trying to organise his family.
- Simon Salad-Cream – A pastiche of TV and radio presenter Simon Mayo. The four-frame strip shows him presenting a very mundane radio show. Not an overtly funny strip; its humour lay in the implied criticism of the supposed dullness of Mayo's show at the time.
- Simon's Snowman – Occasional strip which featured in some Christmas issues during the 1990s. A parody of The Snowman, in which a violent, foul-mouthed snowman takes a young boy on a drinking, striptease and gambling spree.
- Single Middle-Aged Brothers – two middle-aged bachelor brothers who are very socially inept, frequently arguing over very childish topics or making unsuccessful attempts to approach women.
- Sir Edmund Hilarity – a mountaineer who continually endangers the lives of his team by playing inappropriate practical jokes on them during an expedition to climb Mount Everest. The team die when a Sherpa unwittingly lights up one of Hilarity's joke exploding cigars, causing a fatal avalanche. Hilarity's camera is discovered 50 years later by modern-day climbers, who develop the film to discover that Hilarity did not take any pictures of the trip, and instead used the entire roll of film to take pictures of himself at Base Camp with his teammates' toothbrushes inserted up his bottom. He is a parody of the late real-life New Zealand explorer and Everest conqueror Sir Edmund Hillary.
- Sir Fred Goodwin the Fat Cat – the former governor of the Royal Bank of Scotland Fred Goodwin parodied as an overweight feline forced to catch mice in order to earn his pension.
- Skinheed – An early comic strip showing a young man with social problems turning into an inhuman monster.
- Skippy the Bush Kangaroo – A kangaroo that lives in a woman's pubic hair.
- Sleeping Bag – A half-page one-off, rather sad strip featuring the characters from Bagpuss, who discuss where Bagpuss has disappeared to, noting that he was taken to the vets...for something. The last frame shows Bagpuss's cushion in the corner...but no Bagpuss.
- Smiling Susie – A very cheerful waitress, who is unfairly blamed for the murder of two patrons at the restaurant where she works; all of which turns out to be a set-up for a marriage proposal from the man she secretly loves. No one seems to mind the fact that he actually killed two people for this.
- Sniper of Death - A heroic corporal in WWII takes down an enemy sniper, and saves the life of a gravely wounded sergeant, using New Age methods such as feng shui and homoeopathy.
- The Snowmeth – One-off parody of The Snowman. Just like in the film, James builds a snowman which comes to life, however the awkward placement of his eyes and giving him a tomato for a nose causes the Snowman to start drinking meth. He drunkenly grabs James's hand and starts flying only to collide head-first with a brick wall, killing them both.
- Spawny Get – a boy whose initial apparent bad luck always turns into incredible fortune.
- Specky Twat – a boy who suffers bad vision, and wears thick glasses. He often mistakes things for something else.
- Spoilt Bastard – Real name: Timothy (Timmy) Timpson. A long-running and iconic VIZ strip featuring a horrible, fat, ungrateful and vicious-tongued 6-year-old boy (who never seems to age!) who manipulates his weak-willed mother into satisfying his hollow and selfish desires, usually with serious health-threatening, or financial destroying, or both, consequences for her. She is named more than once as "Sissy" – which pretty much describes her personality. She often addresses him in terms of endearment: "My Little Prince", etc. and when things go wrong (as they inevitably do) she is forever blaming herself, "Oh if only I were a better mother!" – sob, sob!! The character is similar to a comic strip which appeared in Monster Fun and later Buster called Mummy's Boy. His name, as it contains an obscenity, is often altered slightly, or is covered by a picture element, whenever featured on the front page of an issue of Viz, as it would be easily read by children who are otherwise not entitled to buy the magazine. For example: "Sboilt Pastard". One shudders to think what his life would be like for those around him if he were released after schooling on the rest of the world! Happily, as has already been noted, he does not appear to age, thank goodness; although one cannot help feeling sorry for Sissy even though she is a right twit!
- Stag Knight – a one-off strip of a buck's night/stag night in the time of King Arthur/Camelot. Strip shows, late-night kebab shops and a barroom brawl is presented in Ye Olde Englishe.
- Stalin on the Corner Watching the Girls Go By – a strip about Joseph Stalin attempting to pick up women with a series of increasingly ridiculous lines. Most of the women are horrified, but when he finally meets one who is attracted to Communist dictators, she instead goes home with Chairman Mao.
- Stamp-Addressed Antelope – A one off strip about an antelope who offers people rides by means of adding a stamp to it.
- Stan the Statistician – a nerd who tells everybody the probability of every event.
- Star Pupil – A schoolboy who believes he is a celebrity.
- It Started With a Piss – A one-off strip about a man who constantly urinates in the sink whenever he wakes up in the middle of the night, despite his wife begging him not to.
- Step Ladder – A strip about a family of ladders.
- Steve Irwin – Nursing Home Care Assistant – A one-off strip featuring Steve Irwin as said nursing home care assistant, describing the elderly as the animals he encounters such as crocodiles.
- Sting of the Dump - a parody of Stig of the Dump in which a young boy finds the pop star Sting living on a landfill site. After an adventure with the boy, Sting heads to one of his numerous luxury homes abroad, with no explanation given as to why he was living at the dump in the first place.
- Straw, Berry and Cream – single surreal strip where the British Government assigns Jack Straw, Mary Berry and the band Cream to stop an alien threat in 60 minutes or the world will be destroyed with nuclear weapons. After many mishaps, the aliens turn out not to be hostile, and everyone enjoys a picnic at 10 Downing Street with food provided by Mary Berry.
- Street Corner Sid – a man who struggles to make a living selling cigarette lighters on the street. He eventually gets his utilities disconnected (since he has not made enough profit to pay the bill) and is killed in a gas explosion after trying to use the lighter to see inside his house.
- Student Grant – an upper middle-class student at Fulchester (or sometimes Spunkbridge) University, who is fashionably and smugly "right on" and a left-wing radical, and who is routinely bailed out by his affluent parents when things go wrong. Grant does little or no work for his degree. One strip had him visiting his department (he had to be directed by a friend) to see his personal tutor, who pointed out that he had not handed in a single essay in three years. The terms seem ridiculously short (4 weeks in one case, the Christmas vacation lasting from mid-November to late March). When UK students received a maintenance grant and free tuition Student Grant appeared in most issues. In late 2010/early 2011, Grant reappeared again following the student riots against tuition fees, ending up in a "taxi" that turns out to be a limousine carrying Prince Charles and the Duchess of Cornwall. He has a number of friends just like him, eager to express their individuality by wearing the same clothes, fashions, invariably ridiculous, like huge hats, bright yellow dungarees and T-shirts with slogans on them like Thunderbirds Are Go! and, in the late 1990s especially, Teletubbies Say "Eh Oh"!. All the female students have the same forename and are identical in appearance and dress. They are opinionated and talk loudly and ignorantly about various subjects, tagging "...actually!" at the end of their sentences, "proving" their intelligence by listing the grades they got in their A-levels. Several of Grant's friends have bizarre speech impediments, dental deformities, or both, or worse – much worse!
- Suicidal Syd – a manically depressed young man who makes various unsuccessful attempts to kill himself. Each strip involves Syd becoming depressed over some issue and deciding to commit suicide and will typically make three attempts only for each of them to fail somehow (for instance, in one strip he draws what he thinks is a cartoon of Muhammad and shows it to a group of fanatical Islamists, hoping they will murder him, but he then realises he has actually drawn a picture of Muhammad Ali). After several suicide attempts, Syd's faith in humanity was restored only for him to die in random circumstances soon afterwards. Much like Big Vern, he is always resurrected in time for the next strip.
- Super Fly-Tip Guy – A man who frequently engages in illegal dumping (called "fly-tipping" in the UK), including of his own wife's body after she suddenly dies from heart failure.
- Supergod and the Son of Man Wonder – A strip about God and Jesus depicted as superheroes.
- Super Mario Curie – A strip depicting Marie Curie as Mario from Super Mario Bros.
- Super Villain Dad – A strip about a father who thinks he is a supervillain.
- Swallows and Amazon – A parody of Swallows and Amazons where the children's mother suggests they go out and have an adventure. They decline, as they are all reading their Kindles or watching Prime Video.
- S.W.A.N.T – a crack paramilitary police team with "Special Weapons and No Tactics" which parodies American SWAT teams.
- Sweary Mary – a character who resembles The Beano's Minnie the Minx. Her sole purpose in life was to say as many rude words as possible; and the comic's story revolved around her attempts to evade censorship. When she was finally granted her wish to swear on the front cover, she lost her voice and was ridiculed by the other regular characters. Since then she has not reappeared as the comic's creators felt that the character had been taken as far as she can go; although other characters still use the word "fitbin" (which Mary claimed was incredibly rude) as an expletive. The first appearance of what would eventually be known as "Roger's Profanisaurus" was a special "Sweary Mary's Dictionary" that came bundled with a regular issue of the magazine. One recent edition of the Profanisaurus is titled "Hail Sweary" (a parody on the RC 'Hail Mary'), in Olde Englishe, with Roger in monastic robes kneeling. seemingly in prayer to the right, which is probably a nod to her heritage.

== T–Z ==
- Tabman – a parody of Batman, in which a superhero and his sidekick attempt to solve crimes despite being constantly breathless because of their heavy smoking habit ("tab" is northern English slang for a cigarette.)
- Tanya's Time-Travel Teapot – a girl who uses her magical teapot to reverse the flow of time and change events to help her friend win a showjumping contest. (306)
- Tara Palmer Banana Pyjama Tomkinson - a strip portraying Tara Palmer-Tomkinson as an irresponsible, drug-fuelled socialite with a name so long it takes up the entire assigned word count of her newspaper column.
- Tarquin Hoylett – he has to go to the toilet – finds himself saving a desperate situation – e.g. landing a jumbo jet after the flight crew fall unconscious – only to abandon the effort at the last moment in order to visit the lavatory. "Excuse me, I must go to the toilet." (025, 026)
- Tasha Slappa – originally Kappa Slappa, after the sportswear brand, but changed on "legal advice". She is a teenage girl who follows a stereotypical "chav" lifestyle, and lives at home in Newcastle with her lazy, irresponsible mother and countless siblings, all from different (and unknown) fathers. Her main pursuits involve maximising her income from the state benefits system (for her own use) and shoplifting. Tasha is a moody, belligerent and foul-mouthed teenage girl. She is arrogant, aggressive and frequently dismisses things with "I divvint give a fuck" (divvint is Geordie dialect for don't). She also has a boyfriend called Bobba – who it is hinted may also be her father and grandfather – who is fiercely defensive of her and has a violent temper, so that she can persuade him to beat up just about anyone for the most arbitrary of reasons. (Overtones of 'Big Fuckin' Dave' – which see) He is not very intelligent and is susceptible to anything she tells him, enabling her to get the better of him if he upsets her or tries to order her about. She is unbelievably lazy, constantly truants and will go to any lengths to avoid any other work. She was an avid fan of the now-defunct Jeremy Kyle Show (a British television chat show aimed at a lower-class audience) and many of her schemes centered on procuring a way for her to sit at home all day and watch it non-stop. Her other hobbies include having sexual intercourse with strangers (when Bobba is not around), binge drinking, smoking and gossiping with her equally delinquent friends. As well as her being Rat Boy's sister, Tasha's mother ("Mam") and numerous children have had their own strips in the comic.
- Tax Inspectre – A ghost that works as a financial auditor.
- Teds and Ralph – In a parody of the Ted and Ralph sketch from The Fast Show, Ralph awkwardly tries to ask Ted up to the manor house. As soon as Ralph leaves, it is revealed that Ted has been having a picnic with the titular bear from the film Ted, who is unimpressed by Ralph.
- Teevee Twins – Two young boys who attempt to make their own TV programmes (using a cardboard box as a pretend camera), pestering people for interviews and even deliberately causing accidents so they have something exciting to film. The strip would usually end with them trying to "film" some kind of violent criminal and being beaten up.
- Telly Evangelist – A Roman Catholic priest, Father O'Brien, who is addicted to television. Whenever he is not watching television he is talking about it (often doing both at the same time).
- Terry Addict – a man obsessed with TV, who goes to desperate lengths to watch television after his own set is stolen by a burglar. He eventually gets arrested after Mrs Brady, Old Lady (which see) reports him to police for loitering outside a television shop.
- Terry Fuckwitt – "The unintelligent cartoon character"; an extremely dim-witted boy. Fuckwitt continuously mistakes situations, objects and people for each other. In appearance, he is cross-eyed and has wild black hair sticking up in a style resembling dreadlocks, and wears absurd platform shoes. Due to the swear word in his name, the comic never prints it in its entirety on the front page, often obscuring it with another graphic element, or else spoonerising it to "Wuckfitt". In one strip he appears to be getting married, but it is revealed that he is not in a church, but in a nuclear power plant, and that his bride is a rod of uranium. Fuckwitt's surreal misunderstandings are sometimes extended in multiple directions, or even circularly. Fuckwitt may be chastised by another character for being in the wrong place, and that character may later themselves be revealed to be someone completely different based on a misunderstanding of the first character, making it apparent that in fact Fuckwitt's initial impression was correct. These "facts" then may be completely reversed in a surprise reveal in the next frame, and so forth.
- Terry and Dune – A four-frame once-only in which Terry is warned by June to 'Walk across the patio without rhythm, dear'. He manages to sit down, but then in the last frame a Dune sandworm crashes up from below and breaks the patio!
- Terry the Tanked-Up Engine – Once-only spoof on Thomas, in which Terry and his friends are found sleeping off a huge binge. The controller comes on the scene, singing the following version of the old favourite, after which they wake up and immediately throw up:
  Down by the station, early in the morning,
  see the little puffing billies standing in a row.
  Man on the engine, pulls the little lever,
  'Toot-toot, barf, barf, up they throw!'
- Terry Tree – A man who turns into a tree at inconvenient times.
- Tex Wade – "Frontier Accountant"; cowboy desperado and financial auditor who shoots dead anyone who crosses his path (and fails to balance their books properly).
- The Adventures of Sir Isaac Newton – A strip about Sir Isaac Newton trying to prove his theory of gravity by making apples fall to the ground.
- The Artist Formerly Known as Prince in the Tower – whimsical strip where, after reading about the Princes in the Tower, musician Prince travels back in time to Plantagenet London to save them from Richard III.
- The Clockwork Mountie Grand Prix Boxing Jungle Boy of the Foreign Legion – 18 Year old Jack Simmons who was the most unusual legionnaire at the Saharan outpost of Fort Laplume. Raised in the African jungle by a family of apes, flyweight boxing champ Jack was the lucky owner of a fantastic formula one racing car which was carried everywhere by his incredible army of miniature robotic Canadian Mounties.
- The Droop Group - a group of awkward teenagers trying to rebel. They are into nu metal and horrorcore music.
- The Human League (In Outer Space) – a strip featuring the 1980s pop band and their adventures in outer space (parodying the cartoon series Josie and the Pussycats in Outer Space).
- The Lap-Dancing Nit Nurse of Greyturrets School - After an outbreak of headlice at an elite public school, the local nurse turns out to be indisposed, so the headmaster hires a lap dancer as her replacement to inspect the boys' hair. It turns out the whole operation was a clip joint-style scam, as he then charges the boys £5,000 each for the fruit juice they drank during the examination.
- The Lion, the Witch, and the Wardrobe Full of Porn - A parody of The Chronicles of Narnia, where the Pevensie boys are too preoccupied with the pornographic magazines they found in the wardrobe to notice all the wonderful adventures going on outside.
- The Teacher from the Black Lagoon – a parody of the Creature from the Black Lagoon. A monstrous teacher drags victims to his underwater classroom where he bores them to death with lessons.
- The Three Blairs – A parody of The Beano's Three Bears featuring Tony, Cherie and Leo.
- The Three Wise Stooges – A strip about The Three Stooges as the three wise men delivering presents to baby Jesus.
- The Things – bizarre aliens that were contrived into situations whereby the human participants could say things like "These things... (situation)..."
- Thermos O'Flask – A man who dresses as a Thermos flask and cannot keep away from prostitutes. Each strip revolves around Thermos's attempts to avoid encountering a prostitute, but he always gives in by the end.
- There's a Holness in my Pocket – Young Danny Dearelizadeareliza was the luckiest owner of a miniature Blockbusters host Bob Holness, which lived in his jacket pocket.
- The Kray Kittens – A one off strip about The Kray Twins, Reggie and Ronnie as kittens causing problems for a family man.
- The Mcbrowntrouts – strip centred on a Scottish family and their toilet-humour antics. A parody of the real comic strip The Broons.
- The Two Ronnies and Their Gangs - a strip portraying Ronnie Barker and Ronnie Corbett as the leaders of two gangs of warring TV personalities (in the style of The Jocks and the Geordies) competing to win a go-kart race. Corbett's gang wins when Jeremy Beadle sabotages Barker.
- The Vibrating Bum-faced Goats – an influential one-off strip where two schoolchildren from the city go to stay with their grandfather in the countryside. The grandfather owns a herd of petrol-driven mechanical goats with buttocks in place of faces – referred to in the strip as robotic rump-resembling ruminants.
- Thieving Gypsy Bastards – Infamous one-off strip about Irish travellers, the "Mc O'Dougles", who descend on a middle-class front garden and steal and vandalise everything in sight, with the approval of the local council, before moving on. On the next page there was a three-panel "compensatory" strip entitled The Nice, Honest Gypsies. It involved an old Romany woman giving change back to a home owner who had been overcharged for some clothes pegs. An end note adding that in next month's strip The Good Honest Gypsies would be renewing the car tax on their big American car. Both strips caused uproar from race relation groups in the UK. The publishers were accused of promoting prejudice and hatred against an ethnic minority. Following involvement by the UK's Commission for Racial Equality, the British Romany Council and even receiving a reprimand from the United Nations, the next issue of Viz contained a 'cut-out-and-keep' apology, subtitled "what every gypsy's been waiting for!".
- Thomas the Tank Top and Friends – A parody of Thomas and Friends depicting the titular E2 Tank Locomotive as a wooly jumper.
- Thomas and the Breakdown – Quarter-page adaptation of Thomas in which a (suicidal?) fellow jumps in front of Thomas causing the engine to have a massive nervous breakdown. The last frame has everyone except Thomas asleep, and from Thomas' shed comes a huge sob!
- Thoughtful Bully – A high-school student who can present a good case to his teacher why he should be allowed to bully his classmates.
- Timothy Potter – Trainspotter – A trainspotter who went round taking video of trains with his camcorder, in particular British Rail Class 37 locomotives, then had "one off the wrist" whilst playing back the videos on the telly. Often portrayed as being very short sighted (for example he mistook a set of golf clubs for his brother).
- Tina's Tits – A schoolgirl with unreasonably large breasts. She is convinced that they possess magical powers, when they clearly do not.
- Tinribs – recalls the adventures of schoolboy Tommy Taylor and his "incredible robot" Tinribs. Despite the fact that Tinribs is supposedly a highly advanced robot, it is obvious that he is made up very basic parts including a skateboard, a box, two tins and a voicebox that constantly repeats "Hi. I'm Barbie. I love you very much.". Regardless, everyone around Tommy believes Tinribs to be a miracle of technology, with the exception of teacher Mr Snodworthy who always ends up suffering graphic and very painful injuries during the course of each strip. Based on the D.C. Thompson character Brassneck.
- Tip Top Tony – an obese, childlike man obsessed with his favourite brands of highly processed food (including Tip Top canned cream, PEK canned pork, and Blue Riband biscuits), much to the annoyance of his elderly mother with whom he lives. In each strip Tony becomes suicidal after his mother tries to serve him something new or tells him his favourite brand has been discontinued. An exasperated police officer tries to talk Tony out of jumping; but soon falls into despair himself because his own food preferences are just as specific.
- TNT Tommy – a boy with a compulsion to blow people up for no apparent reason.
- Toast Kid – a child who attempts to solve problems using toast.
- Toby's Jug – A strip about a boy called Toby who claims that his jug can solve people's problems, except it does not.
- Tom and Gerry – a one off strip that is a parody of Tom & Jerry, the only real difference being that Jerry's name is spelt with a G instead of a J. The strip is centred on Tom finally catching Jerry and commenting, "Got the bastard!"
- Tommy and his Magic Arse – A one-off strip from the late 1980s in which the titular character's arse "isn't magic all the time, only when I talk in rhyme". In fact it is never magic at any time and Tommy simply soils himself and others.
- Tommy and his Magic Shoes – A one-off strip from the late 1970s (also appears in The Big Hard One annual) in which the titular character gets requested from a random reader who appears in the strip to see his magic shoes, only to be told that "some bleeder ripped them off".
- Tommy and his Trifle – "Young Tommy Thompson was the luckiest boy in Barndale, for he had an enormous trifle." Tommy and his trifle get involved in snack-related hijinks at his school.
- Tommy "Banana" Johnson – an influential early strip since reprinted in different formats such as a "12" remix", an 'Irish Dance' version, and an "on ice" version. The strip depicts the titular boy with a giant banana, pointlessly offering it to solve people's problems. A policeman then shoves the banana up Johnson's anus.
- Tommy Salter – Chemical Capers – A young boy obsessed with performing bizarre experiments (such as forcing his sister to smoke asbestos cigarettes) with a total disregard for safety. His name comes from the Thomas Salter range of chemistry sets popular during the 1970s and 1980s.
- Tommy Tetley's Topping Teapot – A boy who owns a magical teapot attempts to start a business selling tea, but fails as he cannot lift the enormous, heavy teapot.
- Tommy's Gun – A one off strip about a boy with a gun who fires rounds of bullets at everything until he gets shot by an armed policeman.
- Tony Slattery's Phony Cattery – A strip in which Tony Slattery inexplicably owns a fake cattery with a cardboard facade and recorded cat noises.
- Topless Jan Fox and her Cornflakes Box – A dimwitted young woman who wanders around wearing nothing above the waist (hence the "topless" part) who believes a box of cornflakes she is holding has magical powers.
- Topless Skateboarding Nun – A companion piece to Nude Motorcycle Girl, this strip features a well-endowed young nun who fights crime and saves orphans while riding on a skateboard – naked except for a wimple, a sensible skirt and big clumpy shoes.
- Tranny Magnet – a short, balding middle-aged bachelor who is irresistibly attractive to transsexuals and cross-dressers, although he desperately wants to find a real woman. (The title is a pun on the expression "Fanny Magnet" meaning variously something which will supposedly make a man highly attractive to women, or, a man who imagines himself to be so.)
- Tristram Banks and his Jocular Pranks – A man who plays very serious, even fatal, "pranks" on others (such as cutting someone's nose off with a machete) until his surviving victims conspire to get him back by running him over with a steamroller.
- Trumptown – A very bleak version of Camberwick Green's Trumpton, featuring Donald Trump building a wall to separate Trumptown and Chigley, making Chigley pay the bill, throwing Chigleans back through the gate in the wall, shooting others who disagree with him and making a very bad impression on most. There is one peasant, obviously brainless, who keeps on shouting 'TRUMP! TRUMP!' and cheering him on. The reader is left to draw their own conclusion.
- Tubby Johnson – an impossibly fat boy.
- Tubby Tucker The Big Fat...Person – A one off strip about an obese boy who eats anything and ends up in a surgery room and ends up having his intestines sent to a sausage factory.
- Twitter Parish Council – A group of town councillors who never get anything done, as they are constantly arguing as if on Twitter (even though their meetings are held in-person.)
- VAR Wars – A one-off strip where Luke Skywalker and Darth Vader's lightsaber duel is interrupted by a referee wanting to check a video replay of Luke's hand being sliced off, with the two complaining that things were much better when they were allowed to just get on with it.
- V.D. O'Nasty – A one off strip about a boy called Vincent Damien O'Nasty who loved watching horror movies, he even tries to emulate them until he gets stabbed in the back by his own mother after recreating the iconic shower scene from Alfred Hitchcock's Psycho.
- Vibrating Bum-Faced Goats – The goats of the title help children solve crime and save people. A parody of animal features common in the 60s and 70s, like Lassie, Skippy etc., as well as Enid Blyton's Famous Five books.
- Vicki Drake – A woman who acts everyday life as if she is hosting a talk show. A parody of real-life talk show host Ricki Lake.
- Victor and his Boa Constrictor – A strip about a man and his pet boa constrictor. A parody of Sid's Snake from Whizzer and Chips.
- Victor Pratt, the Stupid Twat – A top hat-wearing twat, who makes poor puns to his friend on a motorcycle.
- Victorian Dad – a father who applies strict Victorian values to himself and his family, even though they are living in the present. This also appeared during the Back to Basics campaign, and could be seen as a satirical commentary on it.
- Vidal Baboon – A baboon employed as a "stylist" at an upmarket hairdresser's; it ends up scalping the customer and trashing the salon (issue 125)
- Vlad's Army – A parody of Dad's Army starring Vladimir Putin.
- Wacky Racists – a parody of the Hanna-Barbera cartoon television series Wacky Races, featuring a number of far right personalities including Adolf Hitler, Eugène Terre'Blanche, Unity Mitford (akin to Penelope Pitstop), the Ku Klux Klan and David Irving with his companion mutt Mosley (akin to Dick Dastardly and Muttley). Vehicles included the "Mein Kampfervan".
- Wanker Watson – a parody of the Winker Watson strip from The Dandy, set in a boys' boarding school, following the antics of Watson and his friends, and their hapless nemesis, Mr Creep. This strip prompted litigation by Dandy owners, D. C. Thomson & Co. Ltd.
- We ... – A very bleak strip in which a man is seen working in different businesses, usually providing some kind of service to people in financial hardship (such as a bank, private loans company, pawn shop, car hire, or running a very questionable guest house). He is completely unsympathetic to customers' personal circumstances, insists they pay the maximum of charges and fees, refuses to negotiate, and constantly mocks and demeans them for their unfortunate situation. However, some of his customers are shown to be equally unscrupulous, e.g. in one strip where the man's business is buying hair for use in wigs, he deals with a family who have forced all their children to sell their hair in order to raise enough funds for an Xbox. Some strips have shown him in positions of authority (such as a bailiff or security guard) or simply as an aggressive salesman – one strip had him exploiting a customer's pay per view porn habit in order to sell an outrageously expensive TV and sound system. The title of the strip comes from its description of the business involved, e.g. "We Buy Gold" or "We Give Money"; and the main character's habit of saying "We ..." in order to justify his actions as company policy. Often he has featured in other strips where such a person is needed.
- We Three Kays – A one-off strip featuring Peter Kay, Vernon Kay and Gorden Kaye in the roles of the Three Wise Men visiting the newborn Jesus during the Nativity. Despite Gorden's worries that he is not as famous as Peter and Vernon, he is gratified when Jesus asks him to recall his car accident from 1990.
- Wee Radge Joe – A short man who tends to make too much of an accident, misunderstanding or taunting from youngsters, ending in him getting beaten up as he will not "Let it go" or walk away when the other person involved (who is usually larger than him) is happy to do so.
- Will Selfie – A narcissistic young man obsessed with taking the perfect selfie, even to the extent of mutilating himself to look good in the pictures. His name appears to be based on that of author Will Self.
- William's Pissed Wellingtons – a young boy and his alcoholic Wellington boots. The name is a pun on the UK children's TV cartoon series William's Wish Wellingtons.
- Whinging Pom – a stuffy, homesick English expatriate who unfavourably compares everything he experiences in Australia, including a beating meted out to him.
- Whiskers Galore – a man goes into an unfamiliar pub and is unnerved to notice that he is the only patron without a bushy beard. The title is a pun on Whisky Galore!
- Whitty's Titty Clam Gang - surreal strip where Chris Witty and a group of clams fly around the British countryside in a giant pair of mechanical breasts and stop a corrupt mayor whose local council's policies are contributing to child obesity.
- Whoops! Aisle Apocalypse – a strip concerning a couple whose husband insists on buying food (and occasionally other items) from the discounted aisle in his local supermarket. As a result, the couple often end up eating food that is well-past its sell by date (and usually having already started to spoil) as well as often getting into fights with similar thrifty people. In one 2025 strip the husband finally agrees to stop visiting the discount aisle, only to be forced back into it by the constant rise in energy prices.
- The Wispa Man - a parody of The Wicker Man, combined with a then-recent (spring 2026) news story about the theft of 12 tons of KitKats. A police officer goes to a remote Scottish island investigating the theft of a large quantity of Wispa bars, but is captured and burned alive inside a giant Wispa by the local people, who want to use him as a human sacrifice so they won't lose their teeth from the huge amount of confectionery they eat.
- A Woke Werewolf in London – a young Londoner with very politically correct views, who is bitten by a werewolf and turns into one himself. He goes on a rampage and mauls someone, only to regret it and apologise as they are on the minimum wage. The following day, he has no memory of any of this; but the right-wing press have picked up the story and are complaining about the "woke werewolf" being an example of cancel culture.
- Wolf Halls – A middle-aged couple obsessed with wolves who appear to dislike another couple of a similar age, who appear to have an obsession with tigers. The two couples are oblivious that the daughter of the wolf couple and the son of the tiger couple are in a relationship (i.e. a modern take on Romeo and Juliet).
- Woman Man – A strip about a male superhero whose powers are that of the common everyday woman.
- Wooly Wilfy Wichardson – a man with a left-wing leaning (e.g. he tries to tell two other men to stop fighting in a pub) and a speech impediment (as suggested in the title) who had his own strip in an early issue of Viz, but has more recently appeared in other strips – for example, as a counsellor who tries to curb Spoilt Bastard's bad behaviour, but actually ends up spanking the obnoxious boy.
- X-Ray – A boy named Ray who has X-ray vision glasses that help him solve a robbery (and ogle a policewoman whose uniform he can see through.)
- Xmas Perv – A one-off strip featuring Maxwell, a kinky Christmas pervert. Mrs Ottershaw makes an appearance, as does the "Ladies Fundamentals" shop, both featured in Archie McBlarter's Farting Dilemmas.
- Yakety Yak – A one off strip about a yak that talks too much.
- Yankee Dougal – an English kid who thinks he is American. He eventually gains US citizenship, and is drafted to serve in the Vietnam War.
- Yasser's Glasses – A one off strip about Yasser Arafat who owns a pair of glasses that can see through women's clothing, except he ends up seeing through men's clothing instead.
- Yeti Wainthropp Investigates - a parody of Hetty Wainthropp Investigates where the title character is a yeti.
- Young Bailey – A one-off strip featuring a schoolboy who looks and behaves like Rumpole of the Bailey. He argues constantly with his parents and teachers over trivial points and shouts "Objection!" while being caned by the headmaster. The original Young Bailey is a character in Dickens' Martin Chuzzlewit.
- Young Max and his Celebrity Pervert House of Wax – a schoolboy who owns a wax museum where all the exhibits are of celebrities convicted of child molestation.
- Young Stan, Son of Man – A young boy who blesses his family, says "verily" a lot, blesses the bread at breakfast, and moves (i.e., walks) in a mysterious way. An irritation to his mother.
- Zip o' Lightning – a strip about a young boy who believes he has an alien friend, who is actually a robber with a bucket on his head.
- 11 Dads for Daisy – the story of a young girl who is raised by Plymouth Argyle F.C. after the deaths of her parents.
- 4737, Carling – a parody of Scum in which all the characters are represented by drinks on the shelves in an off-licence.
