= The Modern Parents =

Comic strip from the British comic Viz

The Modern Parents is a comic strip from the British comic Viz created by John Fardell who both writes and illustrates it. One of the most enduring and frequent strips in Viz, having appeared regularly since the early 1990s, it is a parody of 'ethically aware' middle-class parents and the New Age movement. Similarly to Fardell's other creation, The Critics, it satirises liberal snobbery. On one occasion, the Modern Parents and the Critics appeared in the same strip, each pair mistakenly attending the event intended for the other, though the two strips are generally slightly different in tone and style.

"The Social Affairs Unit's Reverend Peter Mullen has described their parenting style as:

"These creepy, empty-headed trendies have a son who is not merely allowed to do exactly as he likes but in a perfect state of satanic permissiveness is compelled to do as he likes. This is child-abuse of the worst sort. No landmarks. No boundaries. Ultimately, therefore, no understanding of good and bad."

== Malcolm and Cressida ==
Malcolm and Cressida Wright-Pratt (their surname is a pun on 'right pratt', a good description of their personalities) are parents whose obsession with ethical and environmental awareness often works against their basic role as parents to Tarquin and Guinevere. The Modern Parents do not believe in childhood activities such as fairgrounds, fast food restaurants, games, competitions and sports, toys, normal holidays or mainstream school and impose their moral positions on their children and the children of others. They take the moral high-ground because of their ideologies and expect everyone to appreciate their actions, however the two are just as hypocritical as much as they are pretentious (as displayed in one strip when they began a campaign against slavery but then employed unpaid interns to do the work for them).

In the March 2008 issue of Viz they visit Uncle Eddie for his daughter Amy's second birthday party and give their niece an ethical gift, which seems (to Eddie) to be a "donation to an Oxfam-funded goat thingy for a starving African family", but turns out to be a donation to their own "Malcolm and Cressida Ethical Living Awareness Project". Tarquin and Guinevere give her a teddy bear to the dismay of Malcolm and Cressida, who declare it to be "an anthropomorphisation of wild animals", "an attempt to brainwash Amy into keeping pets" and "offensive and oppressive to the Sudanese people" (referring to the contemporary Sudanese teddy bear blasphemy case). They then assume Amy will "at least appreciate our effort to reduce the bear's carbon footprint by putting it in the recycle bin" and snatch it from her.

Both have large upturned noses. Cressida has her hair pulled back in a tight pony-tail and Malcolm has a scruffy beard and incredibly large teeth. Malcolm and Cressida were not originally married as they believed it to be an outmoded and sexist institution that enslaved women. However, they did eventually marry to get their wedding gifts. They had their own pagan ceremony and wrote their own vows ("Do you, Cressida, take Malcolm to be your husband so long as you find it acceptable and convenient?")

Cressida delights in pointing out that, as a woman, she is an oppressed minority while Malcolm frequently claims he has "Sensitive Persons Syndrome". A committed environmentalist, he insists he supports public transport, but cannot use it himself because his Syndrome prevents him from getting on a bus or train and his Volvo "is Scandinavian, so it must be eco-friendly". The pair often identify themselves with ethnic minorities, claiming to have some Celtic heritage or that they were Native Americans in a previous life.

Malcolm and Cressida believe that all humans are equal even to the extent that there is no such thing as immaturity. Tarquin is often greeted by the sight of his parents openly having sexual intercourse (having also previously announced this intention to their children). Each story finds them forcing their children into some new ethically aware activity that ostensibly encourages a policy of togetherness but ends up with Tarquin and Guinevere often escaping to their much more realist Uncle Eddie (Cressida's brother) who supplies them with ice creams and trips to theme parks.

Malcolm has a brother, Oswald, married to Lana (real name Linda), and a neurotic spinster sister, Joy. Oswald and Lana have an extremely snobbish son, Hector James. The family are Conservative and rich, damning the British worker and the foreigner with equal vigour. Malcolm also used to be a keen Young Conservative before meeting Cressida while canvassing. Lured by Cressida into a new world of progressive ideological debate (and sex), Malcolm abandoned his dreams of becoming a future Tory Prime Minister and grew a beard. One episode shows Malcolm's lock-up garage where he keeps a motorbike and a topless women calendar on the wall. He goes for a ride on the bike but is injured by Cressida, who does not know it is him and throws a protest sign at the front wheel, throwing him off. Unconscious, he imagines an alternative reality in which he has an attractive wife and is Prime Minister. Another day Cressida takes two ethically-aware friends for a tour of the house and visits Malcolm's computer den. He is caught in the den playing pornographic computer games such as "Deth Fuck" and "Karate Whores Must Die" whilst leering and salivating wildly.

Cressida's family have made few appearances: her mother and father seem to be separated and her mother appears to drink. When Malcolm left her and Tarquin, Cressida wondered what she was going to do for money until Tarquin pointed out that it was always her father who sent her monthly cheques. However her father had taken a new mistress: since this meant he had no money to give to his daughter, Cressida experimented with prostitution.

An early Viz character, called Mike Smitt, looks similar to the original form of Malcolm. This character is referred to as a patronising git, as all he does is talk to people as if they are stupid, or point out to the whole street that a girl on crutches is disabled and unable to speak up for herself.

== Tarquin and Guinevere ==
Tarquin is the elder child, aged about twelve, often the voice of common sense, a very effective foil to Malcolm & Cressida due to his desire for normality or to make money. His diplomatic ability is a means of resistance to parental authority diametrically opposed to their schemes: he is calculating and methodical in his manipulation of Malcolm & Cressida. He has a rational, scientific worldview that rejects vague ideas about spirituality and seems grounded in evidence and deductive reasoning. As a result, he is very sceptical about ideas such as crystal healing or rebirthing, questioning their rational basis, even asking a practitioner of "Wan-Ki": "Where did you get your diploma, University of Mumbo-Jumbo?" When Malcolm and Cressida take him to a "Whole Self Centre", claiming that he suffers from an "erotic shame complex", Tarquin talks of a workshop about discovering the inner child. He gets the attendees to undress and touch each other, dance, and feel each other's bodies while several smartly dressed businessmen queue and pay to watch through the windows. It's a front for a sleazy peep show. Occasionally a strip would have Tarquin showing little involvement, or none at all in the parents' end. A Christmas themed strip had Tarquin reprimanded for wanting toys for Christmas "when there is so much suffering in the world". Malcolm attempts to make amends by dressing as a "nature spirit", which is foiled when he jumps out in front of a neighbor's child, mistaking him for Tarquin, and is beaten and apprehended by the child's father, having recently heard news of a child molester in the area. Cressida cancels her plans with Tarquin to sort it out with the police, leaving Tarquin some money for the health foods store. Tarquin uses it to get the toys he wished for, as well as pizza while watching the Christmas day James Bond film.

Despite his female name, Guinevere is a boy. Wanting to avoid gender stereotyping, Malcolm and Cressida occasionally try to make one or both of their sons wear girls' clothes or take "female" roles in some psychobabble ceremony. Guinevere was born during the course of the comic strip and after growing to his current age of about five or six, stopped there. Tarquin appeared to get older in the early years of Modern Parents and in one episode turned thirteen. Guinevere, whose name is usually just shortened to "Guin" by his brother, is largely a passive character, easily upset, his big brother often coming to his rescue. Guinevere's first word was football although Malcolm and Cressida were keen for it to be dolphin.

== Other characters ==
Malcolm and Cressida have many friends, notably Ashley and Cordelia in the Ethically Aware Parents Support Group, who, like them, are middle-class, politically correct and often into various causes. Most of them have children who, without exception, have the same despairing and uncooperative attitude towards their parents as Tarquin and Guinevere. Cressida's brother, Edward – more commonly known as simply Uncle Eddie – acts as a counter-weight to his sister and brother-in-law and treats his two nephews, Tarquin and Guinevere, like normal boys. 'Guest' characters include Dr Earnest Rabbitt (who is firmly opposed to killing animals) and Professor Ruth Lesscow (an extreme women's rights activist). In earlier episodes of the strip, Tarquin had a friend called Ian, of whom his parents clearly disapproved, and once a girlfriend called Dawn, of whom Malcolm and Cressida thought Tarquin was controlling and possessive.
