= Brain Damage (comics) =

British adult comic

- Cover of first edition of Brain Damage

Publication information
- Publisher: Galaxy Publications
- Schedule: Monthly
- Format: Ongoing series
- Genre: Humor/comedy
- Publication date: 1989 – 1991
- No. of issues: 29
- ISSN: 0955-274X

Brain Damage, also known as The Damage, was a British adult comic that was published monthly by Galaxy Publications (Tristar Publications as of issue six) and edited by Bill Hampton from 1989 to 1992.

Brain Damage was one of many comics trying to emulate the success of Viz; however whereas most of its peers were crude, low-quality Viz imitations, Brain Damage attempted to capture the high end of the market, with contributions from recognised cartoonists and satirists, and a strong leaning towards UK politics. In this way, it seemed to aspire to be a more modern Oz. Many issues contained a central theme around which strips were supposed to focus. Each cover featured an unnamed mascot which vaguely resembled the 1980s children's TV puppet Gilbert the Alien.

Its sibling titles included the direct Viz clone Gas and reprint anthology Talking Turkey.

The first volume of the series was published in 1989 as Brain Damage for eleven issues, and transitioned to the title The Damage with issues twelve and thirteen: issue twelve featured the cover title "The Damage" while the title page and subscription pages still featured "Brain Damage", while the cover and subscription page of issue thirteen featured "The Damage" with "Brain Damage" appearing only on the cover page. The series continued with a second volume in 1990, of which only the first issue included "Brain Damage" on the title page. A third volume was published in 1991, concluding with volume 3, number 4, the twenty-ninth issue. In addition to the standard issues, three special issues were published: The Great Big 1990 Annual (December 1989), Spring Annual 1990 (Spring 1990), and The Xmas Damage (December 1990). The volume three numbering continued with Elephant Parts magazine, which ostensibly incorporated The Damage, but as it was printed on different paper stock and with a markedly changed editorial (abandoning the political aspects in favour of surrealism), it was effectively a different magazine. Elephant Parts ran for five issues, concluding with volume three, number nine.

On 18 June 2009, all rights to the Brain Damage comic series were acquired by Untitled Project Productions in Brooklyn, New York. The intent was to produce a series of half-hour animated TV shows.

== Regular strips ==
- Andy The Anarchist by Anthony Smith – a stereotypical anarchist.
- Arseover Tit by Hunt Emerson – a two-headed creature called Alf (as in "half and half") and his adventures in society. Usually Alf would get mangled after failing to decide which way to jump from an oncoming attack due to having two heads.
- Cameraman by Stevie Best – a day-to-day story of a cynical paparazzo (tabloid photographer).
- Hell's Rotarians by unknown – setting septuagenarian Rotarians as Hells Angels
- Home Front by John Erasmus – a strip involving a mother and son, the mother being a cheerful psychopath who caused carnage each issue, embarrassing her son.
- Rymeword Scrubs by Doug Cameron and Ben Norris – a prison to house cartoon characters with rhyming names (e.g. David Fottom, with a talking bottom).
- The Striker Wore Pink Knickers by Tony Husband and Ron Tiner- a pastiche of Roy of the Rovers type strips about a girl playing professional football posing as a man. The strip ended with all the main characters realizing they were homosexual and being murdered by a skinhead.
- The Watchdogs by Tony Reeve – two cartoon dogs, based on Douglas Hurd, the then Foreign Secretary, and Mary Whitehouse, the Christian morality campaigner.
- Sam Shovel by Kev F. Sutherland – a pun-filled detective parody in the style of Jim Steranko's early graphic novel Chandler.
- Watch With Mutha by Doug Cameron and Ben Norris – one-off strips poking fun at children's television, with adult themes.
- We Ran The World by Andy Oldfield and Mike Roberts – a lavish colour strip containing analysis of British culture and history from a left-wing (and often Marxist) perspective. Two recurring characters were a teenage skinhead indoctrinated by tabloid newspapers and his world-wise grandfather (who had fought against Oswald Mosley). These characters were later replaced by an archetypal bearded, bespectacled intellectual and an immortal Karl Marx.
- Wildtrouser Hall by Cluff – about an aristocratic family who were psychopathic Nazi parasites.
- The Andy Oldfield Column – political rants accompanied by satirical cartoons by Clive Wakfer.
- Edith Appleby: O.A.P. Warrior by David Leach – a little old lady in a nursing home becomes a vigilante after the murder of a number of her friends at the hands of the home's corrupt staff. Written as a series, only two episodes were published before the magazine's closure.
- Diary of a Mad Housewife by Neil Nixon/ Stanley Manly – the surreal rantings of a married woman, written as a diary entry, which appeared regularly in Elephant Parts. Nixon wrote prose pieces and items for all the Galaxy adult humour titles, including some repeating ideas, but this was his only regular strip.
- TimTim by Herpes, a parody of Hergé's Tintin.
