= Malcolm Douglas =

Malcolm Douglas may refer to:

- Malcolm Douglas (documentary maker) (1941–2010), Australian wildlife documentary film maker and crocodile hunter
- Malcolm Douglas (politician) (born 1941), New Zealand politician of the Labour Party
- Malcolm Douglas (illustrator) (1954–2009), British illustrator

== See also ==
- Malcolm Douglas-Hamilton (1909–1964), Scottish nobleman
- Malcolm Douglas-Pennant, 6th Baron Penrhyn (1908–2003), Welsh peer
