= Camouflage (Chris Sievey song) =

Single by Chris Sievey
- B-side: "Flying Train" (for 16K ZX81), "Flying Train" (for 1K ZX81), music video for "Camouflage"
- Recorded: 1983
- Genre: New wave, pop
- Length: 3:20
- Label: Random Records, EMI
- Songwriter(s): Chris Sievey
- Producer(s): Martin Hannett

"Camouflage" is a single released by the English musician and comedian Chris Sievey in 1983. The single is notable for its B-side, which rather than containing another song, contains the audio tones for three programs Sievey created for the Sinclair ZX81 computer. Two programs were for a video game Sievey created called Flying Train, and the other was the code for the music video to "Camouflage". The video claimed that this was "the world's first computer promo".

== Origin ==
The song was released during a hiatus with Sievey's band the Freshies. The documentary film Being Frank: The Chris Sievey Story features clips from interviews Sievey gave at the time of the song's release, stating that it came about when he went to pay a telephone bill and instead purchased a ZX81. He then learned how to program and created the song, "which used the Cold War as a metaphor for love's frustrations."

While the A-side was a conventional single, the B-side contained what sounds like random noise. This noise was actually a series of three programs for the ZX81. Two of these were the 16 kilobyte and 1 kilobyte versions of "Flying Train", a video game he created, which involved having to land a flying train onto a track while avoiding birds. The third program was an animated music video for the song "Camouflage". In order to play the video, the user had to record the B-side onto cassette tape, load the data from the tape into the ZX81, and then run the program while playing the A-side at the same time, so that the music synchronised with the video.

== Reception ==
"Camouflage" failed to chart when it was released, but retrospectively critics have praised the creation of the single for how forward-thinking it was at the time. Bob Sorokanich writing for Gizmodo said that: "It's a graphic style that artists and musicians find fascinating today, and Sievey's experiment foreshadowed the Enhanced CDs that offered up all kinds of easter eggs when you'd pop them in your computer's CD-ROM drive".

== Aftermath ==
In 1984, Sievey created the video game The Biz for the ZX Spectrum, a simulation set in the music industry. The B-side of The Biz featured eight songs by Sievey and the debut of his most famous creation, the comic character Frank Sidebottom. Rhys James Jones wrote in The Conversation that: "It's possible to see Sievey's retreat into his Frank disguise as a reaction against "Camouflage"'s failure. But it's telling that the computer press, particularly the Spectrum magazine Crash, adored Frank. Home microcomputing, and the tools surrounding it, helped bring about one of the best-loved pop parodists of the past 30 years."

== Personnel ==
- Chris Sievey – lead vocals, keyboards
- Paula and Winifred (the Vizzable Girls) – backing vocals
- Mike Doherty – drums
