= Allan Ross =

Scottish footballer

James Allan Ross (26 May 1942 – 2 November 1999) was a Scottish professional football goalkeeper who played most of his career for Carlisle United.

Although always listed with the English 'Alan' on teamsheets, Ross's birth certificate lists him as the Scottish 'Allan'. Ross holds the all-time appearance record for Carlisle United, 466 games. Ross was once called on during an injury crisis to play outfield as a substitute. Ross was part of the Carlisle team who were promoted to the First Division in 1974.

Ross could have been transferred to Celtic in the late 1960s, but Carlisle United blocked the move. Around the same time he trained with the Scotland squad, but was never given a full international cap. After his retirement Ross remained in Carlisle, working in housing for the city council.

Details of Ross's career can be found in Legends of Carlisle United by Mick Mitchell which features a lengthy interview, and Paul Harrison's Lads in Blue which includes a statistical summary of Ross's career and a round-up of every season during which he played. Neil Nixon's memoir; Singin' The Blues is dedicated to Alan Ross.
