= Sounds (magazine) =

UK weekly music magazine (1970–1991)

- Cover of Sounds (24 May 1980)
- Categories: Music newspaper
- Frequency: Weekly
- First issue: 10 October 1970
- Final issue: 6 April 1991
- Company: Spotlight Publications
- Country: United Kingdom
- Based in: London
- Language: English
- ISSN: 0144-5774
- OCLC: 56364019

Sounds was a UK weekly pop/rock music newspaper, published from 10 October 1970 to 6 April 1991. It was known for giving away posters in the centre of the paper (initially black and white, then colour from late 1971) and later for covering heavy metal (especially the new wave of British heavy metal (NWOBHM)), punk and Oi! music in its late 1970s–early 1980s heyday. Additionally, the magazine was responsible for coining the term "new musick", which would later become known as "post-punk".

== History ==
Sounds was produced by Spotlight Publications (part of Morgan Grampian), which was set up by John Thompson and Jo Saul with Jack Hutton and Peter Wilkinson, who left Melody Maker to start their own company. Sounds was their first project, a weekly paper devoted to progressive rock and described by Hutton, to those he was attempting to recruit from his former publication, as "a leftwing Melody Maker". Sounds was intended to be a weekly rival to titles such as Melody Maker and New Musical Express (NME).

Sounds was one of the first music papers to cover punk. Mick Middles covered the Manchester music scene for Sounds from 1978 to 1982 writing about many of the up and coming bands of the time from Buzzcocks and Slaughter & the Dogs to the Fall and Joy Division. John Robb joined in 1987 and used the term "Britpop" to refer to bands such as the La's, the Stone Roses and Inspiral Carpets, although it did not develop into the Britpop genre/movement at that time (as these acts were grouped under labels such as baggy, Madchester and indie-dance).

Keith Cameron wrote about Nirvana after Robb carried out the first interview with them in 1989. Although the magazine was already defunct, Kurt Cobain wore a white, long sleeved Sounds t-shirt for a photoshoot in London on 22 August 1991 and the next day when they played the Reading Festival for the first time.

The Obscurist Chart ran for about a year, first appearing on the 5 September 1981 issue, as an alternative to the main, sales-driven record charts, allowing bands and music outside the mainstream to be recognised. The chart was started by Paul Platypus, who played with Mark Perry in the Reflections and compiled the first nine charts. The last chart appeared in the 11 December 1982 issue.

In 1987, Morgan-Grampian had been acquired by United News and Media (later to become United Business Media), first as part of the United Advertising Publications (UAP) division and later as part of the then CMP Information portfolio. A legacy of Sounds was the creation of the heavy metal/rock magazine Kerrang!, which was originally issued as a supplement before being spun off as a separate publication.

Sounds folded in 1991 after the parent company, United Newspapers, decided to concentrate on trade papers like Music Week and so sold most of their consumer magazines titles to EMAP Metro, with Sounds being closed at the same time as its sister music magazine, the more chart and dance music oriented Record Mirror.

== Contributors ==
Contributors included Garry Bushell, Sandy Robertson, Giovanni Dadomo, Mick Middles, Phil Sutcliffe, Geoff Barton, John Robb, Phil Bell, Mick Sinclair, Caroline Coon, Antonella Gambotto, Vivien Goldman, Jane Jackman (who wrote as "Jane Suck"), Jonh Ingham, Alan Moore (a.k.a. "Curt Vile"), Lizo Mzimba, John Peel, Barbara Charone, Edwin Pouncey (a.k.a. "Savage Pencil"), Cathi Unsworth, Jon Ronson, Jon Savage, Sylvie Simmons, Penny Valentine, Marguerite Van Cook, Mary Anne Hobbs, Mat Snow, Johnny Waller, James Brown (who went on to form Loaded), Andy Ross (who wrote as "Andy Hurt" and went on to form Food Records), Steve Lamacq, Kev F. Sutherland and Russ Carvell's UT strip, and photographers Michael Putland, Ian Dickson, Jill Furmanovsky, Andy Phillips, Steve Payne, Virginia Turbett, Tony Mottram, Gavin Watson, Ross Halfin and Janette Beckman.

Among editorial and advertising staff were Billy Walker, editor, Alf Martin, chief sub and Len Driver, advert production.

== Bibliography ==
- Haddon, Mimi (2023). What Is Post-Punk?: Genre and Identity in Avant-Garde Popular Music, 1977–82. University of Michigan Press. ISBN 978-0-472-03921-0. Archived from the original on 13 November 2025.
- Heylin, Clinton (2007). Babylon's Burning: From Punk to Grunge. Canongate Books Ltd. ISBN 978-1841958798.
