= Falsetto (disambiguation) =

Falsetto is the vocal register occupying the frequency range just above the modal voice register and overlapping with it by approximately one octave. It is commonly cited in the context of singing.

Falsetto may also refer to:

== Music ==
- "Falsetto" (song), the second single from The-Dream's debut studio album
- Falsetto Keeps Time, the first EP released by The Promise Ring
- Falsettos, a musical consisting of:
  - March of the Falsettos, a musical
  - Falsettoland, a musical with a book by James Lapine and music and lyrics by William Finn

== Other uses ==
- Falsetto (horse), an American Thoroughbred Champion racehorse
- The Scottish Falsetto Sock Puppet Theatre, a comedy act that began in the UK
- Falsetto, a character in the 2007 Xbox 360 and 2008 PlayStation 3 game Eternal Sonata
- Falsetto Jones, a villainous dog breeder from Kim Possible, named for his helium-affected voice
