= Camouflage (disambiguation) =

Camouflage is a method of avoiding detection by mimicking the surrounding environment.

Camouflage may also refer to:

== Film and television ==
- Camouflage (1944 film), an American animated short film
- Camouflage (1977 film), a Polish film
- Camouflage (game show), a 1961–1962 American TV show, revived in 1980
- Camouflage (2007 game show), an American TV word game show

== Psychology ==
- Masking (behavior), also known as social camouflaging
- Autistic masking, also known as camouflaging

== Music ==
- Camouflage (band), a German synthpop band

=== Albums ===
- Camouflage (Acoustic Ladyland album) (2004)
- Camouflage (Lara Fabian album) (2017)
- Camouflage (Merzbow album) (2009)
- Camouflage (Rod Stewart album) (1984)
- Camouflage (Rufus album) (1981)
- Camouflage (Sonny Condell album) (1977)

=== Songs ===
- "Camouflage" (Brad Paisley song) (2011)
- "Camouflage" (Stan Ridgway song) (1986)
- "Camouflage" (Chris Sievey song) (1983)
- "Camouflage", by Brandy from Human (2008)
- "Camouflage", by Jess Moskaluke from Past the Past (2017)
- "Camouflage", by Mariah Carey from Me. I Am Mariah... The Elusive Chanteuse (2014)
- "Camouflage", by Mr and Mrs Smith and Mr Drake from Mr and Mrs Smith and Mr Drake (1984)
- "Camouflage", by Third Eye Blind from Blue (1999)
- "Camouflage", by Selena Gomez from Revival (2015)
- "Camouflage", by BoyWithUke from Lucid Dreams (2023)
- "Camouflage", by Aespa from Lemonade (2026)

== Other media ==
- Camouflage (novel), a novel by Joe Haldeman

== See also ==
- Aircraft camouflage
- Camoflauge (1981–2003), American rapper
- Category:Camouflage patterns
- Military camouflage of uniforms, vehicles or other equipment
- Ship camouflage
