= Oink! (comics) =

British children's comic

Publication information
- Publisher: Fleetway
- Schedule: Fortnightly (May 1986–December 1987); Weekly (January–May 1988); Monthly (June–November 1988)
- Format: Comics anthology
- Genre: Humour, children's
- Publication date: 3 May 1986–22 October 1988
- No. of issues: 68

Oink! was a British comic book magazine for children which was published from 3 May 1986 to 22 October 1988. It set out to be deliberately anarchic, reminiscent of Viz but for children. The creators also cited Mad magazine as a major influence.

Part of its difference in the marketplace was that it attracted writers and cartoonists from a wide range of previous disciplines. It was devised, launched and edited by Patrick Gallagher, Private Eye regular contributor Tony Husband and Mark Rodgers, although within the fiction of the comic it was "edited" by a character called Uncle Pigg (similar to 2000 AD's Tharg the Mighty). The comic also followed 2000 AD's lead in crediting its contributors for their work, still a rarity in British comics at that time. Featured artists and writers included comedian Bard of Timperely and aspiring pop star Frank Sidebottom aka Chris Sievey, Husband's Private Eye colleague David Haldane, ex-The Fall member and future BBC Radio 1 radio host Marc "Lard" Riley, Malcolm Douglas, Brickman creator Lew Stringer, future Beano writer/artist Kev F Sutherland, future Marvel artist, writer and editor and SpongeBob SquarePants Magazine editor David Leach, future Financial Times cartoonist Jeremy Banks, and satirical media commentator-to-be Charlie Brooker. Viz founders Davy Thorp and Chris Donald also contributed some one-off strips, as did The Beano's Tom Paterson and John Geering. Illustrator Steve McGarry was an occasional contributor, including creating front covers for three issues.

Oink! proved somewhat controversial, with various conservative groups and a chain of newsagents branding it offensive and unsuitable for children. A notably controversial item was the story "Janice and John and the Parachute Jump", a parody of the Janet and John readers which appeared in issue 7, which prompted an official complaint to the Press Council. The Council ruled in Oink's favour (and the strip was subsequently reprinted in the comic alongside an editorial about the affair) but the negative publicity resulted in some newsagents, including WHSmith, placing it on the top shelves away from other comics, thus damaging its sales potential to its young target audience. An item on how the poll tax meant people owning parrots had to pay tax unless they were members of the Conservative Party was read out in the House of Commons.

Originally a fortnightly publication, it became weekly and finally monthly and was finally wound up in November 1988 after 68 issues, though both a summer and winter special were published in 1989, and a final summer special (consisting almost entirely of reprinted material) in 1990. Three Oink! strips transferred to Buster: "Weedy Willy", "Pete and his Pimple" and "Tom Thug", the latter appearing through to the comic's last issue in 1999.

The comic's editors Patrick Gallagher, Tony Husband and Mark Rodgers, would go on to create the CITV programme Round the Bend for ITV Yorkshire and Hat Trick Productions. Hat Trick co-founders Jimmy Mulville and Rory McGrath would be credited as script editors on series one, alongside Geoffrey Perkins.

In 1987 Oink! was made into a computer game of the same name.

Mark Rodgers' archives relating to Oink! are held by Archive Services, University of Dundee.

== Notable strips ==
Some of the most popular recurring characters in the comic were:

- Uncle Pigg, whose staff were known as the Plops (apparently, sentient mounds of faeces) and who had an ongoing battle with conservative critic Mary Lighthouse (an obvious parody of Mary Whitehouse) (usually written by Mark Rodgers, artwork by Ian Jackson)
- The Street-Hogs (writer Mark Rodgers, artwork Malcolm Douglas as J.T. Dogg), anthropomorphic crime-fighting biker pigs
- Harry the Head (he was only a head) (Marc Riley)
- Billy's Brain (he was only a brain) (David Haldane)
- Horace "Ugly Face" Watkins (Tony Husband)
- Weedy Willy (artwork Mike Green, sometimes written by Mark Rodgers, Vaughan Brunt or others)
- Pete and his Pimple (the Pimple was on Pete's nose and was bigger than he was) (Lew Stringer)
- The Secret Diary of Hadrian Vile (an obvious parody of Adrian Mole) (writer Mark Rodgers, artwork Ian Jackson)
- Tom Thug (who spent most of the first six months of publication attempting to tie his bootlaces) (Lew Stringer)
- Mr Bignose (Jeremy Banks)
- Burp The Smelly Alien (who could talk to his internal organs, many of which could talk back) (Jeremy Banks)
- Rubbish Man (an inept superhero) (David Haldane)
- Hugo the Hungry Hippo (David Haldane)
- Cowpat County (Davy Francis)
- Frank Sidebottom (Chris Sievey)
- Psycho Gran (David Leach)

Satirist Charlie Brooker, who was still at school at the time, contributed various strips, none of which were true "regulars" individually, but which recurred in loose rotation. These included "Freddie Flop (He Falls to Pieces)", "Disgusting Des", "Clint Gritwood, The Trigger-Happy Cop", "The Adventures of Death" and "Transmogrifying Tracey (She Can Change Into Anything She Likes!)".

Aside from straightforward comic strips, the comic would also include spoof news items, adverts (usually for the fictional GBH brand) and so forth. The comic also featured many parodies of films, TV shows, and strips from other comics. There were also regular photo stories, with photography by James Gallagher (and sometimes Martin Zukor), often starring Snatcher Sam, who was 'played' by Marc Riley.

As the title suggested, pigs were a constant theme. Celebrities would regularly be caricatured as pigs, complete with punning names (Peter Swillton, Michael Jaxham, Janice Pong, etc.) and even existing comic strips would be parodied with a pig theme (e.g. "Ham Dare, Pig of the Future!"). Russell Grant and his horoscopes were also parodied as "Russell Grunt's Hogoscopes". Besides Mary Lighthouse, Uncle Pigg's biggest enemies were butchers, the most vicious of whom was Jimmy "The Cleaver" Smith.

For most of the comic's run, each issue had a theme (e.g., Christmas, holidays, family etc.) which often allowed the comic to experiment. One issue (dubbed "Oink! goes Peculiar") showed everything going wrong in the Oink! offices, leading to strips being printed upside down or being drawn by the wrong artist etc. In another issue, Uncle Pigg and the Plops all went on holiday, leaving a skeleton staff (of literal skeletons) to produce the comic. The themes were dropped when the comic went weekly at the beginning of 1988.

Some items aimed slightly over their target audience's heads – in one strip, Weedy Willy wandered around moaning whilst being followed by a shadowy stranger who was writing down everything he said – for example, "Oh, I would go out tonight but I haven't got a stitch to wear", and "Heaven knows, I'm miserable now." At the end of the strip, the figure was revealed as Morrissey, getting ideas.

The first issue came with a free flexi-disk single featuring "The Oink Song" and "The Oink Rap" credited to Uncle Pigg and The Oinkletts, mostly the work of Marc Riley.
