= A-Z of Rude Health =

- Starring: Dr Phil Hammond; Dr Annie Evans; Kev F Sutherland
- Country of origin: United Kingdom
- No. of series: 1
- No. of episodes: 6

Production
- Producer: Mark Ashton
- Running time: 30 minutes
- Production company: HTV

Original release
- Network: ITV
- Release: September 2002 – October 2002

A-Z of Rude Health is a medical series taking a lighthearted look at sexual health. For every letter of the alphabet, a topic of sexual health was covered. e.g. A for Anal, B for Balls, C for Chlyamydia etc. The factual but lighthearted studio segments were presented in a semi-improvised format by Dr Phil Hammond and Dr Annie Evans after scripting discussions between the presenters and Mr Peter Greenhouse, while all three worked together at the Bristol Department of Sexual Health, and the vox pops and comedy pieces were written and performed by Kev F Sutherland. It was broadcast late on Friday night on regional ITV in the Bristol and West area.

The same production team, at HTV in Bristol, went on to produce the first TV series of The Sitcom Trials, also for ITV.
