= Sex Secrets of Ancient Atlantis =

1986 novel by John Grant

Sex Secrets of Ancient Atlantis is a novel by John Grant published in 1986.

== Plot summary ==
Sex Secrets of Ancient Atlantis is a narrative featuring sexual revelations about ancient Atlantis.

== Reception ==
Dave Langford reviewed Sex Secrets of Ancient Atlantis for White Dwarf #75 and wrote, "The illustrations are sadly all quite printable; the text pokes fun at UFOlogy, the Atlantis myth, magic pendulums, The Tao of Sex, and worse."

Jenny Randles wrote in her book Looking for the Aliens that "Sex Secrets of Ancient Atlantis, which masquerades as a pseudo-Erich von Dänekin report on certain mystical 'discoveries' that, in this instance, ought not to alter anyone's concept of the universe for longer than it takes to read the book itself."

The Locus Index to Science Fiction: 2004 describes the novel as a "Humorous 'epistolary fringe-SF novel,' a mock academic discussion of archaeological discoveries about Atlantis."

The Encyclopedia of Science Fiction noted that "The solo A Directory of Discarded Ideas (1981), largely on Pseudoscience, led directly to his book-length "nonfiction" Sex Secrets of Ancient Atlantis (1985; rev 2004), a broad Parody of pseudoscience in general and Atlantis studies in particular."
