= Chris Sievey =

English musician and comedian

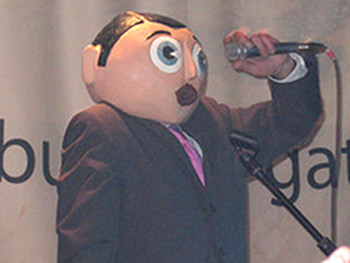
- Sievey as Frank Sidebottom at the Bull and Gate in Kentish Town, London, 2006
- Born: Christopher Mark Sievey; 25 August 1955; Ashton-on-Mersey, Sale, Cheshire, England
- Died: 21 June 2010 (aged 54); Wythenshawe, Manchester, England
- Other name: Frank Sidebottom

Comedy career
- Years active: 1969–2010
- Medium: Comedy; music

Chris Sievey (25 August 1955 – 21 June 2010) was an English musician, comedian and artist known for fronting the band the Freshies in the late 1970s and early 1980s and for his comic persona Frank Sidebottom from 1984 onwards.

Sievey, under the guise of Sidebottom, made regular appearances on North West television throughout the late 1980s and early 1990s, even becoming a reporter for Granada Reports and a late night series on ITV, Frank Sidebottom’s Fantastic Shed Show. Later, he presented Frank Sidebottom's Proper Telly Show in B/W for the Manchester-based television station Channel M. Throughout his career, Sidebottom made appearances on radio stations such as Manchester's Piccadilly Radio and on BBC Radio 1 and BBC Radio 5, alongside Mark and Lard.

== Biography ==
=== Early life and career (1955–1976) ===
Sievey grew up in Ashton-on-Mersey, Sale, Cheshire (2.5 miles from Timperley).

In 1969, when he was 14, Sievey began writing and recording his own music, and by the age of 15 was playing in local bands. In 1971, he hitch-hiked to London with his brother, staging a sit-in at the Apple Records HQ, demanding to see one of The Beatles. When they were asked to leave they insisted on recording something, and were booked into the studio after playing a song to head of A&R Tony King. Sievey subsequently recorded several demos, which he sent to record companies, receiving many rejection letters which he later compiled into a book. Unable to get a deal, he set up his own Razz label in 1974.

=== The Freshies (1977–1982) ===
In 1977 Sievey formed the Freshies, with various other musicians involved including Martin Jackson, Billy Duffy and former Nosebleeds bassist Rick Sarko. A string of singles and several cassettes were released between 1978 and 1983. Most of these were credited to the Freshies, but were occasionally listed as Chris Sievey & the Freshies. In 1981, Sievey played on "Some Boys" by Going Red?, the band formed by former Jilted John star Graham Fellows. The Freshies biggest UK hit was "I'm in Love with the Girl on the Manchester Virgin Megastore Checkout Desk", released initially on his own Razz label (RAZZ 10), it was reissued by the US giant MCA Records with a slightly different title ("I'm in Love with the Girl on a Certain Manchester Megastore Checkout Desk") as there were objections about using the Virgin brand name. The record peaked at No 54. They had regional success in the Manchester area with "My Tape's Gone", "No Money" / "Oh Girl" and "Yellow Spot".

Radio 1, and in particular Mike Read, gave the Freshies a lot of airplay, especially the MCA release. After the "success" of "I'm in Love with the Girl on the Manchester Virgin Megastore Checkout Desk", the group released further singles, "Wrap Up the Rockets" and "I Can't Get 'Bouncing Babies' by The Teardrop Explodes", and although commercially successful in the Manchester area, they failed to make the national charts. They released two further cassettes, Manchester Plays the Freshies and London Plays the Freshies; these were both essentially radio interviews with local and national DJs and concert recordings from each city. Sievey had written his first LP by this stage, The Johnny Radar Story, which, owing to contractual complications, was never released on vinyl. There are master copies on cassette in circulation though (albeit very few). In February 1982, Sievey abandoned the quartet lineup of the Freshies, and reformed it as a duo with Barbara O'Donovan. The duo version of the Freshies released one single, "Fasten Your Seat Belts". In 1982, he released the mini-album Denigration Now.

The following year he had a solo release, "Camouflage", with the A-side a song, and the B-side being computer programming.

=== Frank Sidebottom (1984–1994) ===
The Frank Sidebottom character first appeared on an untitled 1984 EP by Chris Sievey & the Freshies, in a spoken-word track wherein Frank talks to Sievey.

The character was instantly recognisable by his large spheroidal head, styled like an early Max Fleischer cartoon. This was initially made from papier-mâché, but later of fibreglass. In the documentary Being Frank, Martin Sievey (Chris's brother) states this was made using plaster of Paris.

Frank, usually dressed in a 1950s-style sharp suit, was portrayed as an aspiring pop star from the small village of Timperley, near Altrincham. His character was cheerfully optimistic, enthusiastic, and seemingly oblivious to his own failings. Although supposedly 35 years old (the age always attributed to Frank irrespective of the passage of time), he still lived at home with his mother, to whom he made frequent references. His mother was apparently unaware of her son's popularity. Frank sometimes had a sidekick in the form of "Little Frank", a hand puppet who was otherwise a perfect copy of Frank.

Comedy character Mrs Merton started out as Frank's sidekick on his radio show Radio Timperley, and the similarity of the characters is evident, exuding a sense of great ambition which belies a domestic lifestyle in the North of England. Sidebottom's former Oh Blimey Big Band members include Mark Radcliffe and Jon Ronson, and his driver was Chris Evans.

Immediately after creating the character, Sievey would record an in-character cover 'Material Boy', and send it to several major labels with the note ''I'm thinking of getting into showbiz. Do you have any pamphlets?" EMI were interested and offered him an interview. Chris appeared in character as Frank, and was signed to their sub-label Regal Zonophone.

Zonophone released his third EP, Frank's Sidebottom's Firm Favorites, in August of 1985. He'd previously self released two EPs as Frank in 1985, titled 'Frank's Summer Special' as well as an early version of 'Firm Favorites'. The EP reached 97 in the UK Charts on 31 August 1985 before dropping completely. In order to promote the EP, he made an appearance on the TV programme 'TX' the first of many appearances on the ITV network.

His second Zonophone EP, Oh Blimey, It's Christmas, charted slightly higher than the first, at number 87, before dropping off again. It was likely the failure of his third Zonophone EP, Sci-Fi, that caused him to be dropped by the label. Afterwards he was signed to Marc Riley's In Tape label, on which he would release two albums and four EPs.

Despite the minimal chart success from these EPs, Frank had developed a cult following that allowed him to attract audiences upwards of 500 in Northern England and London. This act of extensively touring the country would develop Frank's status. Performances were often varied from straightforward stand-up comedy and featured novelty components such as tombola, and crowd interaction. Sometimes the show also included lectures. Contrasting with the alternative comedians of the time, Frank Sidebottom's comedy was family-friendly, if a little bizarre for some. This family friendly nature led to Frank getting his own comic strip in the children's weekly comic Oink!, which launched in 1986.

His backing band, dubbed The Oh Blimey Band, consisted of Mike Doherty on drums, Rick Sarko on guitar (both formerly of the Freshies), Patrick Gallagher on bass and, later, Jon Ronson on keyboards.

At the same time as touring, Frank would become a semi-regular cast member on the two final seasons of the ITV children's programme No. 73, eventually being grandfathered into its spin off, 7T3.

In 1987, Frank released his first album, a spoken word cassette called Fantastic Tales, released through his own 11:37 label. His first musical album, entitled 5:9:88, was released on vinyl by In Tape a year later. This album introduced the character Mrs Merton, portrayed by Caroline Aherne. Aherne continued to use the character as a comic persona, leading to her own TV show, launching the comedians TV career. Chris and the band, whilst disgruntled by the success of a character created for Frank now detached from Frank, did not resent it, with drummer Mike Doherty saying that while she had taken the character's name, she had crafted her own thing out of it.

Frank was perhaps most popular in the North West of England, where his success was caught up in that of the Madchester scene, and for a time was a regular on regional ITV station Granada, even featuring as a reporter on its regional news programme, Granada Reports.

Along with his frequent television appearances, the Frank Sidebottom character also made appearances on radio, on stations such as Manchester's Piccadilly Radio and on BBC Radio 1 and BBC Radio 5, alongside Mark and Lard.

Jon Ronson first played with Frank's Oh Blimey Band in 1987, when their original keyboardist (Mark Radcliffe) was unable to make it to a gig at The Cricketers pub at Kennington Oval, London SE11. Ronson was social secretary at the Polytechnic of Central London and knew Mike Doherty as an agent. During the band introductions at the end of the show, Ronson noted a negative reaction to his presence, but found that his microphone had been almost completely muted, leaving him completely unheard by the audience. Despite this, one year later, he was offered a full time place in the band, which he accepted.

This same year Frank was included on the charity album Sgt. Pepper Knew My Father, which featured other acts like Michelle Shocked, the Christians, Sonic Youth, Billy Bragg, Hue and Cry, the Fall and Wet Wet Wet. He later recorded "Flying" for another Beatles tribute album, Revolution No. 9.

In 1989, Sievey re-arranged the Oh Blimey Band, introducing Richard Jones from the recently broken up local band the Desert Wolves on bass guitar, along with a new guitarist and saxophonist. Chris wanted to give the band a more professional sound, and booked a 30 date tour, the longest the band had ever undertook. This new lineup was a source of tension between the members, with Richard Jones and Jon Ronson taking a near instant disliking for each other.

The tour and its new sound were panned by audience members and critics alike, leading to Sievey abandoning the new line-up in 1990, instead choosing to perform solo from then on.

After this, Frank began to make semi-regular guest appearances on the final season of ITV programme and No. 73 successor Motormouth, as well as numerous appearances on Channel 4, including the British version of the game show Remote Control which was presented by Tony Wilson, where each week he would pose "Frank's Fantastic Question" to the contestants. The popularity of these appearances led to him getting his own show on the network, Frank Sidebottom's Fantastic Shed Show, which lasted one series in 1992. Afterwards he migrated to What's Up Doc?, where Sievey would not only portray Sidebottom, but also create the recurring segment Life with the Amoebas. After the first two series, Sievey left the show.

=== Retirement of Frank, stop-motion work and failed solo ventures (1995–2004) ===
As the 1990s reached their midpoint, the Frank character began to make fewer public appearances before seemingly being retired. During this time, Sievey began working on a solo album entitled Life in 74 Minutes, which he later abandoned. In 2000 he began working in stop motion animation and became a regular crew member on series 4–6 of Bob the Builder, as well as a writer on the fourth series of Pingu.

In 2003, Chris began working on a new album, entitled Scilly Automatic. One track from this, "Lazy Rising More Slowly, Where R.U, Oh 'Chele'", was released on the 2019 outtakes and rarities compilation Being Frank.

=== Frank's comeback (2005–2010) ===
Frank had faded into obscurity in the late 1990s, rarely appearing either on TV or making live appearances, but a one-off performance at Manchester's Club Indigo Vs Manic Street Mania in December 2005 seemed to be the catalyst for a comeback.

In 2006, Frank reappeared in Greater Manchester on local television channel Channel M. His new show, Frank Sidebottom's Proper Telly Show in B/W, featured celebrity guests and animation. The first showing of each show was in black and white ("so you don't have to turn the colour down"), whilst subsequent repeats were shown in full colour. He also made five appearances on Iain Lee's programme on London's LBC as well as on numerous community radio stations such as Forever Manchester. Frank appeared as a test card shown late at night on Channel M, where he and Little Frank ramble on and sing songs whilst framed in a parody of the classic Test Card F. On 6 March 2007, in an episode of the Podge and Rodge Show on Ireland's RTÉ Two, he appeared in their 'Sham-Rock' talent section, performing a medley of songs by The Smiths. He received an overall score of 22 points from judges James Nesbitt and Glenda Gilson, putting him in first place for all the series' acts so far.

Frank starred in his own exhibition of drawings, animation and cardboard at London's Chelsea Space Gallery next to Tate Britain between 4 July and 4 August 2007. He also appeared at "Late" at Tate Britain on 3 August 2007.

He appeared in the Series 3 Christmas special of BBC Scotland's VideoGaiden, performing "Christmas is Really Fantastic", and later appeared on the Series 3 Awards show, and the final web-exclusive episode ("Closedown"). Frank appeared briefly as a Manchester United fan in an advert for the FIFA 10 video game in 2009.

Frank performed at Bloom Festival in 2007 and Kendal Calling in 2008. In late 2009 and early 2010 he supported John Cooper Clarke on a UK tour.

Frank's last professional appearance was at the Pyramid Arts Centre, Warrington, on 4 June 2010. His last personal appearance was at the Salutation pub, Higher Chatham Street, Manchester on 11 June 2010 when he launched his World Cup single, "Three Shirts on the Line".

Following Sievey's death in June 2010, a social networking campaign was launched to gain Frank his first UK hit. "Guess Who's Been on Match of the Day" entered the charts at No. 66.

== Television work ==
=== Early appearances and No. 73 (1985–1988) ===
Sievey's earliest television appearance was on the children's television show TX, with an in-character interview as Frank Sidebottom, shortly after the release of his first Zonophone EP. The following year, Sievey guest starred on the sixth season of British television series No 73, after which he, portraying Frank, would become a regular cast member for its final two series (the character generally credited as played by 'Francis Sidebottom'). Sievey would be carried over to the show's short-lived spin-off, 7T3, portraying Frank in two early episodes and (credited under his own name) two one-off characters in the latter half of the series: Big Jake, the theme park ghost, and Reg the Greengrocer. Reg is one of the few examples of Sievey playing a character on television not related to Frank Sidebottom.

=== Frank Sidebottom's Fantastic Shed Show / What's Up Doc? (1989–1998) ===
Three years following the end of 7T3, Frank became a regular cast member on the fourth, and final, season of the children's TV series Motormouth. After Motormouth's cancellation, Frank was given his own show, titled Frank Sidebottom's Fantastic Shed Show, a television programme shown in 1992 featuring Sievey as fictional character Frank Sidebottom. Guests included Caroline Aherne, Phil Cornwell, Midge Ure, Gerry Anderson, the Farm, Pop Will Eat Itself, Oceanic and Keith Chegwin. The show’s producer was Dave Behrens and it was a Chameleon Television production for Yorkshire Television and was shown on ITV. The show only went on for one season. Following its conclusion, Sievey became a regular cast member on the first two seasons of What's Up Doc? On the show, as well playing Frank, Sievey would portray Mr. Fantastico, removed after the first season, and Life with the Amoebas.

Throughout the rest of the 1990s, Frank's television appearances would lessen, not attaching himself as a regular cast of anything, but making occasional appearances.

=== Bob the Builder and others (2000–2005) ===
After retiring the character of Frank Sidebottom, Sievey became prop designer and set dresser on the fourth series of stop motion animation Bob the Builder. He remained a crew member until the show's sixth series, but continued to work on specials until 2005. In 2003, he became a writer on Fimbles, and then, in 2004, on the British revival of the Swiss stop motion programme Pingu.

=== Frank Sidebottom's Proper Telly Show / final appearances (2006–2008) ===
In 2006, Sievey revived the character of Frank Sidebottom with the short-lived television series Frank Sidebottom's Proper Telly Show. Throughout 2007, Frank made several television appearances, before releasing his final project, Magical Timperley Tour, a short film featuring Frank touring 100 of his friends around the characters' home town of Timperley.

=== Filmography ===
Year	Title	Role	Director(s)	Notes
1985	TX: Episode 16	Actor, as "Frank Sidebottom"	Richard Bradley & Tim Sullivan	TV appearance, debut of Frank Sidebottom
1986	No 73: Sit	Actor, as "Frank Sidebottom"	Janie Grace	TV appearance
1987	No 73 (Series 7)	Actor, as "Frank Sidebottom"	Unknown	TV show
1987	No 73 (Series 8)	Actor, as "Frank Sidebottom"	Graeme Matthews	TV show
1988	7T3	Actor, as "Frank Sidebottom", & "Reg"	Unknown	TV show
1989	Kazuko's Karaoke Klub: 15 July 1989	Actor, as "Frank Sidebottom"	Unknown	TV appearance
1991	Motormouth (Series 4)	Actor, as "Frank Sidebottom" & "Little Frank". Soundtrack	Graham C. Williams, J. Nigel Pickard, Simon Pearce, Michael Kerrigan, & Nick Bigsby	TV show
1992	Frank Sidebottom's Fantastic Shed Show	Actor, as "Frank Sidebottom". Writer	Dave Behrens	TV show
1992	What's Up Doc? (Series 1)	Actor, as "Life with the Amoebas", "Frank Sidebottom", & "Mr. Fantastico" Soundtrack	Bob Collins & Simon Pearce	TV show
1993	What's Up Doc? (Series 2)	Actor, as "Life with the Amoebas" & "Frank Sidebottom". Soundtrack	Bob Collins	TV show
1994	Something for the Weekend: 1 July 1994	Actor, as "Frank Sidebottom"	Dave Behrens	TV appearance
1998	Endurance UK	Actor, as "Frank Sidebottom"	Unknown	TV appearance
2000	Bob the Builder (Series 4)	Props & set dressing	Liz Whitaker, Brian Little, Nick Herbert & Sarah Ball	TV show
2001	Bob the Builder (Series 5)	Props & set dressing	Liz Whitaker, Brian Little, Nick Herbert & Sarah Ball	TV show
2001	Bob the Builder: "A Christmas to Remember"	Props	Sarah Ball	Film
2002	Bob the Builder (Series 6)	Props & set dressing	Liz Whitaker & Nick Herbert	TV show
2002	Gina and Stella	Voice actor, as "Frank Sidebottom"	Sarah Ball	Short film
2003	Bob the Builder: "Lofty's Long Load"	Props & set dressing	Liz Whitaker	TV show episode
2003	Bob the Builder: "The Knights of Fix-A-Lot"	Assistant to art director	Sarah Ball	Short film
2003	Fimbles	Writer	Helen Sheppard	TV show
2004	Pingu (Series 5)	Writer	Liz Whitaker & Steve Cox	TV show
2004	Bob the Builder: "Snowed Under"	Assistant to art director	Sarah Ball & Jocelyn Stevenson	Short film
2004	Bob the Builder: "When Bob Became a Builder"	Assistant to art director	Andy Burns, Gilly Fogg & Geoff Walker	Short film
2005	Bob the Builder: "Bob's Big Plan"	Assistant to art director	Jackie Cockle & Sarah Ball	TV show episode
2006	Frank Sidebottom's Proper Telly Show (Season 1)	Actor, as "Frank Sidebottom". Writer	Hayley Orwell, Dan Curran, Claire Wolsey	TV show
2007	Frank Sidebottom's Proper Telly Show (Series 2)	Actor, as "Frank Sidebottom". Writer	Hayley Orwell, Dan Curran, Claire Wolsey	TV show
2007	The Comedy Map of Britain: Episode 4	Actor, as "Frank Sidebottom"	Ellen Evans & Matt O'Casey	TV appearance
2007	The Podge and Rodge Show (Season 2): Episode 30	Actor, as "Frank Sidebottom"	Unknown	TV appearance
2007	The Most Annoying Pop Songs.... We Hate to Love: Episode 3	Actor, as "Frank Sidebottom"	Gareth Cornick, Nick Cory Wright, Richard Dean, Chris Hill, Kevin Hylands, Lindsay Jex, Kate Morey & Lyn Rowett	TV appearance
2007	Comic Relief: "(I'm Gonna Be) 500 Miles"	Actor, as "Frank Sidebottom"	Peter Kay	Film
2008	Magical Timperley Tour	Actor, as "Frank Sidebottom", soundtrack	Steve Sullivan	Short film

== Awards and honours ==
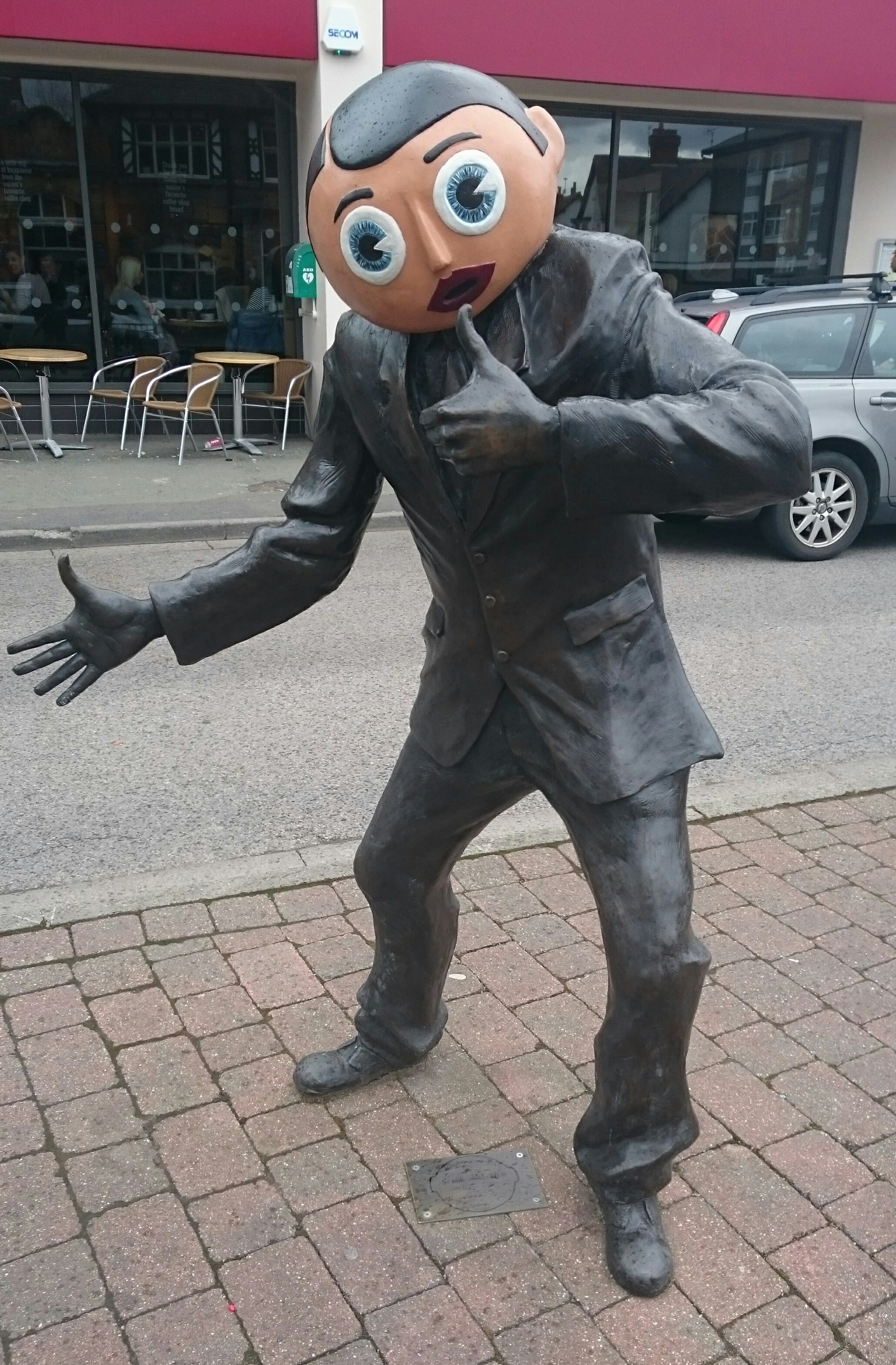
A statue of Frank Sidebottom in Timperley by Colin Spofforth was unveiled on 20 October 2013. The plaque at the base of the statue reads: In memory of Chris Sievey, 1955–2010. Creator of Frank Sidebottom. "As long as i gaze on timperley sunset i am in paradise"

Sievey was posthumously recognised with the special judges' award at the 2011 Chortle Awards. A publicly funded statue of Frank by Colin Spofforth was unveiled on 20 October 2013 at 11:37 in Timperley village, the timing a reference to one of the character's catchphrases.

== Death and legacy ==
Sievey was diagnosed with cancer in May 2010, and died at Wythenshawe Hospital on 21 June 2010 at the age of 54 after collapsing at his home in Hale, Greater Manchester. Sievey left a daughter, Asher, and two sons: Stirling and Harry (1992–2017). After it was reported that Sievey had died virtually penniless and was facing a pauper's funeral provided by state grants, a grassroots movement on various social networking websites raised £6,500 in a matter of hours. The appeal closed on Monday 28 June with a final balance of £21,631.55 from 1,632 donations. Sievey's funeral was held on 2 July 2010 at Altrincham Crematorium. The private service was attended by more than 200 members of his family, friends and former colleagues.

On 8 July 2010, over 5,000 fans of Frank Sidebottom gathered for a party at the Castlefield Arena in Manchester to celebrate Sievey's life. The acts included Badly Drawn Boy and surviving members of Frank's Oh Blimey Big Band who played in tribute.

From 1 March to 30 April 2019, Manchester Central Library held an exhibition Bobbins: Frank Sidebottom and Chris Sievey, which featured never-before-seen items from Sievey’s archives, from puppets to home videos to personal artefacts. The exhibition covered both Frank Sidebottom as well as Sievey's other creative endeavours.

It was announced in April 2019 that GCHQ had cracked the hidden codes and messages that Sievey had left around the borders of his Frank Sidebottom books and recordings.

=== Film ===
==== Frank (2014) ====
The 2014 film Frank, though not a biopic of Frank Sidebottom, was inspired by the character. It tells the story of a young wannabe musician who joins an experimental rock group led by the enigmatic Frank (Michael Fassbender). The film was written by Jon Ronson and Peter Straughan, and was based on Ronson's experiences playing in Sievey's Oh Blimey Big Band. Although drawing from Ronson's memoir, the story is set in contemporary Ireland and America, and the Frank character combines elements of Sievey with Daniel Johnston and Captain Beefheart.

==== Being Frank: The Chris Sievey Story (2019) ====
In 2014, a feature-length documentary about the life and art of Chris Sievey, entitled Being Frank: The Chris Sievey Story was announced and was released in March 2019. It is directed by Steve Sullivan, and was funded through a successful Kickstarter campaign. The film documents Sievey's entire life, including his band The Freshies and his creation of the Frank Sidebottom character, and features interviews with many of Chris Sievey's family and colleagues with exclusive access to Sievey's own personal archive of home movies, diaries, notebooks, props and costumes.

=== Books ===
Jon Ronson, who worked with Sievey, published Frank: The True Story that Inspired the Movie in 2014, a memoir of his time in the Frank Sidebottom Oh Blimey Big Band.

A biography of Chris Sievey, Frank Sidebottom: Out of his Head, was written by Manchester author and personal friend Mick Middles, and was published in November 2014.

== Discography ==
=== Studio albums ===
- Big Record (1986)
- 5:9:88 (1988) As Frank Sidebottom
- 13:9:88 (1988) As Frank Sidebottom
- Medium Play (1990) As Frank Sidebottom

=== EPs ===
- The Freshies (1978)
- Straight in at No. 2 (1979) With the Freshies
- The Men from Banana Island Whose Stupid Ideas Never Caught on in the Western World as We Know It (1979) With the Freshies
- Red Indian Music (1980)
- Wrap Up the Rockets (1981) With the Freshies
- Untitled (1984) With the Freshies
- Frank Sidebottom Sings Frank's Firm Favorites (1985) As Frank Sidebottom
- Oh Blimey It's Christmas (1985) As Frank Sidebottom
- Sci Fi (1986) As Frank Sidebottom
- Christmas is Really Fantastic (1986) As Frank Sidebottom
- Frank Sidebottom Salutes the Magic of Freddie Mercury and Queen and Also Kylie Minogue (You Know,.... Her Off "Neighbours") (1987) As Frank Sidebottom
- Timperley (1987) As Frank Sidebottom
- Frank's Free Fantasic Footy Flexi (1990) As Frank Sidebottom

=== Singles ===
- "Baiser / Last" (1979)
- "My Tape's Gone / Moonmid Summer" (1980) With the Freshies
- "We're Like You / Hey" (1980) With the Freshies
- "Yellow Spot / If Its News" (1980) With the Freshies
- "Oh Girl / No Money" (1980) With the Freshies
- "I'm in Love with the Girl on the Manchester Virgin Megastore Check-Out Desk" (1980) With the Freshies
- "I'm in Love with the Girl on a Certain Manchester Megastore Checkout Desk" (1981) With the Freshies
- "Wrap Up the Rockets / (It's) Gonna Get Better" (1981) With the Freshies
- "I Can't Get "Bouncing Babies" by the Teardrop Explodes / Tell Her I'm Ill" (1981) With the Freshies
- "Dancin' Doctors / One to One" (1981) With the Freshies
- "If You Really Love Me, Buy Me a Shirt / I Am the Walrus" (1982) With the Freshies
- "Fasten Your Seat Belts / Best We Can Do" (1982) With the Freshies
- "Camouflage" (1983)
- "The Oink! 45" (1986) As Frank Sidebottom
- "Frank's Indie Medley" (1987) As Frank Sidebottom
- "Panic" (1993) As the Sidebottoms

=== Compilation albums ===
- In Love With... (1982) With the Freshies
- Frank Sidebottom's ABC & D... The Best Of... (1999) As Frank Sidebottom
- The Very Very Best Of... Some Long and Short Titles (2005) With the Freshies
- E, F, G & H. The Best Of... Volume Two (2009) As Frank Sidebottom
- Fantastic Show Biz Box Set (2010) As Frank Sidebottom
- Early Singles (2013) With the Freshies
- Being Frank: The Chris Sievey Story (2019)
- Cease & Desist (2019) As Frank Sidebottom
- Telephone Line: Monologues And Messages (2019) As Frank Sidebottom

=== Self-released material ===
Released either on cassette or CD-r

Albums

- The Bees Knees (1975) With the Bees Knees
- All Sleeps Secrets (1977)
- The Freshies Sing the Girls from Banana Island Whose Stupid Ideas Never Caught on in the Western World As We Know It (1979) With the Freshies
- Rough n Ready (1980) With the Freshies
- Manchester Plays (1980) With the Freshies
- The Freshies play London (1981) With the Freshies
- Denigration Now (1982) (Mini-album)
- The Johnny Radar Story (1985) With the Freshies
- Fantastic Tales (1987) As Frank Sidebottom
- Radio Timperley C-60 (1990) As Frank Sidebottom

EPs

- Five Songs (1985)
- Frank's Firm Favorites (1985) As Frank Sidebottom
- Frank's Summer Special (1985) As Frank Sidebottom
- We're Gonna to Write Some Invitations (1988) As Frank Sidebottom

Compilation albums

- Early Razz (1985) With the Freshies
- Studio Out-Takes (1985) With the Freshies
- Fairly Fantastic Xmas Box of Goodies (1990) As Frank Sidebottom
- Soundreel A (1992) As Frank Sidebottom
- Bits & Bobbins (2005) As Frank Sidebottom
- Firm Favorites (2006) As Frank Sidebottom
- Little Box of Bobbins (2024) As Frank Sidebottom

=== Videos ===
- Denigration Now (1982)
- Frank Sidebottom's Fantastic Shed Show (1992)
- Frank's World (2007)

=== Video games ===
- Flying Train EMI (1983)
- The Biz Virgin Games (1984)
