= Brickman (comic strip) =

- Author: Lew Stringer
- Website: brickmancomics.tripod.com
- Current status/schedule: Concluded
- Launch date: 1979
- End date: 2009
- Genre(s): Humor, parody, super hero

Brickman is a humour comic strip and character created by UK cartoonist Lew Stringer. A parody of Batman, the spoof features the adventures of zillionaire Loose Brayne and his partner Tina Trowel who fight crime in Guffon City, fighting villains such as the Poker, the Mad Cobbler and Gnat-Woman. The strip's humour uses heavy amounts of puns, sight gags and absurdism.

The strip began in the fanzine After Image No.3 in 1979, before moving on to other small press fanzines and minicomics. Brickman then turned up in his own title published by short-lived UK independent Harrier Comics in 1986, featuring guest pages drawn by Dave Gibbons, Mike Collins, Mark Farmer, and Kevin O'Neill (with an introduction written by Alan Moore). He also made a cameo, alongside discontinued Marvel UK comedy characters in a The Prisoner homage, in Stringer's Combat Colin.

After a ten-year gap while Stringer focused on his other comic characters, Brickman was revived in 1996 in the small press comic Yampy Tales; the character returned to a crime-stricken Guffon City to defeat the evil Mr Cheese and his own sidekick Tina, who had gone rogue. In 2005, the Los Angeles publisher Active Images released a digest size collection of all the Brickman stories under the title Brickman Begins!, with a brand-new opening story by Stringer and Brickman illustrations by guest artists including Hunt Emerson, Alan Davis, Tim Sale and Charlie Adlard.

A new Brickman series titled Brickman Returns, initially with new strips retelling Brickman's early days and then moving on to modern-day strips set after Yampy Tales, began running as full-colour back-up strips in Image Comics/Active Images' Elephantmen comic in 2006. It concluded in 2009.
