= Tom Thug =

British comic strip

Tom Thug was a long-running British comic strip, first published in Oink! in May 1986, then moved to Buster. Created by cartoonist Lew Stringer, Tom was encouraged by his skinhead father to be a school bully like he used to be. However, Tom was so incompetent he could not even tie the laces of his boots. As the strip progressed, every issue would show Tom's attempts at bullying backfire often with slapstick consequences.

The strip proved popular enough to transfer to Buster when Oink! folded in 1988. The editor Allen Cummings asked for a focus on stories of Tom at school and the strip underwent a title change to Tom Thug's Skooldayz (a spoof in name only of Tom Brown's Schooldays). There, Tom Thug continued to run until December 1999 (Buster's final issue), although the last couple of years were reprints of earlier stories due to budget cutbacks by the publisher. Yet throughout the course of publication, Tom Thug had grown to be one of the comic's best-liked strips and occasionally even took the place of the title character, Buster, on the front cover.

In the final issue of the comic at the beginning of 2000 in a segment written and drawn by Jack Oliver, Tom Thug was revealed to have possessed great intelligence after passing all of his exams with flying colours; Tom, who had always prided himself on being a brainless bully, is disappointed to learn that he is in fact a brainy bully. However this was not the ending that the strip's creator Lew Stringer would have given the character.
