= Combat Colin =

Publication information
- Publisher: Marvel UK
- First appearance: Action Force #5 (October 1988)
- Created by: Lew Stringer

Combat Colin is a slapstick comedy adventure comic strip created, written and drawn by humour comic artist/writer Lew Stringer. It appeared in a number of Marvel UK titles.

== Publication history ==
Combat Colin appeared as a back-up humour strip in Action Force comic in the 1980s. Stringer had a back-up story, Robocapers in The Transformers and was asked if he could come up with something similar for Action Force and he came up with a story about a character who was originally named "Dimbo" when he submitted it.

The story then moved over to The Transformers comic for a popular run. After editorial changes dropped humour material from Marvel UK's comics in 1991, Marvel UK gave Lew Stringer the rights to Combat Colin and he revived the character in several small-press titles and fanzines, including a Combat Colin Special with new material.

Colin reappeared as a supporting character in the Brickman back-up strips for Image Comics' Elephantmen series. His final appearance in that comic was in the Brickman strip in Elephantmen No.24, Feb 2010. Since then, brand new Combat Colin strips have appeared from time to time in the digital comic Aces Weekly.

== Fictional character biography ==
The bobblehatted Colin Doobrey-Smiff, otherwise known as Combat Colin, wanted to be a war hero, but even the army thought he was too thick for them; instead, he lived with his Mum and Dad in a suburban English neighbourhood. For many years Colin claimed to have been obsessed with military matters since he was a baby, but he would later admit that all this was a ruse. In fact, he was a comic book geek into adulthood when an alien visited Earth and gave him the "Combat Trousers," which have pockets that contain a gateway into another dimension, allowing him to access all his weapons and equipment.

In the beginning, the strips were simplistic complete slapstick half-page stories. As time progressed, the strip's popularity enabled it to become a full pager. Here, Stringer was allowed to develop the character in a series of two to six part serials. Colin also acquired a gun-toting assistant, Semi-Automatic Steve, and a host of supporting characters including their blonde girlfriends The Giggly Sisters (Julie and Joanne Giggly) and a catalogue of recurring villains. Colin and Steve had many adventures battling villains all over the world and even venturing into space and travelling through time. One of the characteristics of the strip was frequent breaking of the fourth wall - Colin and Steve were aware they were characters in a comic strip (and a back-up strip in a comic about "toy robots," at that).

Recurring villains in the strip included the following:

- Dr Nasty. A mad scientist and ruler of the land "Evilonia."
- Professor Madprof. Another mad scientist, short in stature and appears to have Vulcan ears. Later acquires a dimwitted human sidekick, Moptop.
- The Brain (later Megabrain). An alien with an entire head resembling a human brain. Always trying to conquer Earth. When the Brain was granted his wish of attaining ultimate knowledge from the intergalactic being "Pyramid Head", the Brain amassed too much knowledge and his head exploded. However, the Brain later resurrected himself as a new entity he christened "Megabrain," and resumed his efforts to defeat Colin and conquer the Earth.
- Mountain Man. Possesses a rocky, bulletproof appearance (similar to The Thing of the Fantastic Four). Later acquires a human alias, "The Amazing Dave" (a stage magician).
- Aunt Arctic. A middle-aged female parody of Mr. Freeze. In her final appearance, Aunt Arctic teamed up with Madprof and battled Colin and Steve in Earth's prehistoric past, only to be eaten by dinosaurs.
- Skydriver. An aviation-themed villain.
- DJ Yampy. A villainous disc jockey, specializing in hypnotizing people through music. Possibly a parody of the Hypno-Hustler.
- Ragdoll. A living Rag doll, impervious to bullets.
- Gladys Blemish. Originally Colin's love interest; she later used her "Crusher Tank" to lay waste to the city before Colin defeated her.
- Jane Bondski. A spy who claimed to be the third Giggly Sister ("Jane Giggly") but she confessed her true identity after falling into, and barely escaping, the dimensionally transcendental pockets of Colin's Combat Trousers.
- The Bad Hatter. A hat-themed villain, similar to the Mad Hatter. In his first appearance, the Bad Hatter tricked Colin into wearing a tight-fitting bobble hat that cut off the circulation to his brain, making Colin (temporarily) evil and turn to crime.
- Bankrobber Man. Robs banks.

Supporting characters in the strip included the following:

- Roy L.T. Check. Colin's agent.
- Headline Howard. A tabloid newspaper journalist.
- Combat Kate. Originally a villain, and the girlfriend of Headline Howard. The pair framed Colin for crimes he didn't commit, turning the public against him and allowing Kate to take his place. Colin regained the public's trust when he helped repel an alien invasion, and after witnessing Kate's prowess in combat, Colin suggested she continue crimefighting "oop north" while he remained "darn saff." Kate thereafter became a recurring character, occasionally teaming up with Colin and Steve.

The strip would also feature humorous cameo appearances from Transformers and characters from the Marvel universe.

A fan of The Prisoner television series, Stringer often added references to the TV show in the strip, most blatantly when Combat Colin found himself in "The Place of No Return"; a village resembling Portmeirion in the TV series. Trapped in the Village, Colin discovered it to be a place where old comic characters (Stringer's comedy back-up characters for Marvel UK) were "retired" to. Starting a revolt, Colin led his fellow heroes to escape.

In the final issue of Marvel UK's Transformers series, Combat Colin fought a final battle against Megabrain. Afterwards, he and Steve threw away all their weapons to live a life of pacifism - unfortunately, one of those weapons was a nuclear bomb and they were seemingly killed. A new story Stringer produced for a one-off mini-comic revealed that the nuclear bomb had thrown the heroes back in time to Blackpool in 1967. Brand new Combat Colin strips have recently appeared in the digital comic Aces Weekly.

== Collected editions ==
"The Place of No Return" has recently been reprinted as "Village of the Doomed" in the book Brickman Begins!.

A six-issue Combat Colin comic, reprinting the 1980s strips, began in 2017 and as of 2019 the first four volumes are available for purchase through Lew Stringer's website.
