= Neil Nixon =

- Born: Workington, England
- Occupation(s): Author, journalist, academic

Neil Nixon is an author, journalist and academic from Workington, England. Nixon's published works include titles on the paranormal, popular music, football and two novels published under the name of Stanley Manly. In 1999, he founded the United Kingdom's first full-time higher education course in Professional Writing. Nixon's scripts include material for television and radio. His radio play Mr. Lennon was nominated for a Sony Radio Academy Award for Best Single Drama.

== Career ==
Nixon is a published journalist and was a regular contributor to the Fortean Studies series of books produced by Fortean Times magazine. Nixon's work for the series included papers exploring UFOlogy from the perspective of social science. In his paper in Fortean Studies Volume 6 called "They're Not all Lunatics on the Fringe", Nixon examined the meaning and fulfillment experienced by members of UFO cults. His book UFOs contained a chapter called "Astounding Tales" that cited four cases, including 1976 Tehran UFO incident, as a challenge to all UFO skepticism.

=== Stories ===
Nixon's comedy and fiction writing includes material for many of the UK's leading adult humour comics including Viz, Gas, Brain Damage and Poot!. He has also published two novels under the name of Stanley Manly. The first of these, Raiders of the Low Forehead, was published in 1999 and was one of the first three offerings of Attack! Books. According to a review on Spank the Monkey, the work was "less of a novel than a series of sketches with the slightest of narrative threads holding them together: all short punchy chapters, full of crap puns, relentless internal rhymes and blatantly obvious storytelling." Nixon's next novel, Workington Dynamo, was published in 2008 and follows a more formal structure. The book was noted by 3:AM Magazine to be "a hetero love story for a grrl as well as the soccer club, and his wimmin are a violent counter blast to the rich, thin tory-sucking anti-feminists that currently seem to think that fat poor people shouldn't be allowed to live. Young Dougie Grimton is after his cousin Kerry and the result is a sweet but tangy element amidst the picaresque madness."

=== Courses ===
In 1999, Nixon led the developments for the UK's first full-time higher education course in Professional Writing, a programme he continues to lead. A radio play Nixon wrote called Mr. Lennon was broadcast in 2001. The play imagines the life of John Lennon if The Beatles had failed to secure a record deal. Mr. Lennon was later nominated for a Sony Radio Academy Award for Best Single Drama.

== Selected bibliography ==
=== Stanley Manly ===
- Manly, Stanley (1999). Raiders of the low-forehead. London: Attack!. ISBN 9781840680317.
- Manly, Stanley (14 February 2008). Workington Dynamo. Lulu.com. ISBN 9781435700444.

=== Neil Nixon ===
- Nixon, Neil (29 June 1997). UFOs and Other Close Encounters. Ladybird Books. ISBN 9780721497105.
- Nixon, Neil (1 March 2002). UFOs. Pocket Essentials. ISBN 9781903047880.
- Nixon, Neil (July 2006). Singin' the Blues. Hayloft Publishing. ISBN 9781904524366.
- Nixon, Neil (5 September 2013). Successful Studying. New Generation Publishing. ISBN 9781907502132.
- Nixon, Neil (18 December 2013). How to Get a Break as a Writer. Troubador Publishing. ISBN 9781848765641.
