= John Grant (author) =

Scottish writer (1949–2020)

- Born: Paul le Page Barnett; 22 November 1949; Aberdeen
- Died: 3 February 2020 (aged 70)
- Pen name: John Grant, Paul Barnett, Eve Devereux
- Occupation: Science fiction writer, author
- Language: English language

Website
- johngrantpaulbarnett.com

Paul le Page Barnett (22 November 1949 – 3 February 2020), known by the pen name of John Grant, was a Scottish writer and editor of science fiction, fantasy, and non-fiction.

== Biography ==
Born Paul le Page Barnett in Aberdeen, Scotland, Grant sometime wrote under his own name, as Eve Devereux, and under various other pseudonyms; he has also ghostwritten a number of books. The author of some 70 books in all (excluding ghostwritten books), he has published several original novels as well as one novel in the Judge Dredd series and, with Joe Dever, 11 novels and a novella collection in the Legends of Lone Wolf series; edited several anthologies, beginning with Aries 1 (1979) and most recently New Writings in the Fantastic (2007); and has written dozens of nonfiction works, including several relating to fantasy and science fiction. His collaborators have included David Langford and, as illustrator, Bob Eggleton. With John Clute, he co-edited The Encyclopedia of Fantasy (1997) for which he also wrote all the cinema entries. He has written numerous short stories, articles and columns. Barnett lived in New Jersey with his wife, Pamela Scoville, a noted animation art expert and co-founder with her late husband Michael of the Animation Art Guild. Grant died in February 2020 at the age of 70.

== Bibliography ==
- Vassal, Jacques (1976). Electric children : roots and branches of modern folkrock. Translated and adapted by Paul Barnett. New York: Taplinger. ISBN 9780800823825.
- Planet Earth: An Encyclopedia of Geology, 1977, as Paul Barnett (co-editor with Anthony Hallam & Peter Hutchinson)
- Aries I, 1979, edited as John Grant
- Phaidon Concise Encyclopedia of Science & Technology, 1978, as Paul Barnett, edited by John-David Yule (Contributing Editor)
- The Book of Time, 1980, as John Grant (co-editor with Colin Wilson)
- A Directory of Discarded Ideas, Ashgrove Press 1981, as John Grant
- The Directory of Possibilities, 1981, as John Grant (co-editor with Colin Wilson)
- A Book of Numbers, 1982, as John Grant
- Dreamers: A Geography of Dreamland Ashgrove Press 1983
- The Truth About the Flaming Ghoulies, 1983, as John Grant
- Sex Secrets of Ancient Atlantis, 1986, as John Grant
- Encyclopedia of Walt Disney's Animated Characters, Harper & Row 1987, as John Grant. ISBN 978-0-06-015777-7 (first edition)
- Earthdoom! 1987, as John Grant with David Langford
- The Advanced Trivia Quiz Book, 1987, as John Grant
- Great Mysteries, 1988, as John Grant
- An Introduction to Viking Mythology, 1989, as John Grant
- The Great Unsolved Mysteries of Science, 1989, as John Grant
- Eclipse of the Kai, 1989, as John Grant with Joe Dever
- The Dark Door Opens, 1989, as John Grant with Joe Dever
- The Sword of the Sun, 1989, as John Grant with Joe Dever
- Hunting Wolf, 1990, as John Grant with Joe Dever
- Albion, 1991, as John Grant
- Unexplained Mysteries of the World, 1991, as John Grant
- The Claws of Helgedad, 1991, as John Grant with Joe Dever
- The Sacrifice of Ruanon, 1991, as John Grant with Joe Dever
- The World, 1992, as John Grant
- Monsters, 1992, as John Grant, US title: Monster Mysteries
- The Birthplace, 1992, as John Grant with Joe Dever
- The Book of the Magnakai, 1992, as John Grant with Joe Dever
- Legends of Lone Wolf Omnibus, 1992 as John Grant with Joe Dever
- The Encyclopedia of Science Fiction, 1993 (second edition), edited by John Clute and Peter Nicholls, John Grant technical editor
- Encyclopedia of Walt Disney's Animated Characters 1993 (second edition), as John Grant
- The Tellings, 1993, as John Grant with Joe Dever
- The Lorestone of Varetta, 1993, as John Grant with Joe Dever
- History Book, A Thog the Mighty Text (chapbook), 1994, as John Grant
- The Secret of Kazan-Oud, 1994, as John Grant with Joe Dever
- The Rotting Land, 1994, as John Grant with Joe Dever
- The Hundredfold Problem, 1994, as John Grant
- Dr Jekyll & Mr Hyde, 1995, as John Grant (children's retelling)
- The Encyclopedia of Fantasy and Science Fiction Art Techniques, 1996, as John Grant with Ron Tiner
- The Encyclopedia of Fantasy. edited by John Clute and John Grant, New York: St. Martin's Press, 1997. ISBN 0-312-15897-1.
- Strider's Galaxy, [Legend] 1997, as Paul Barnett
- Frankenstein, 1997, as John Grant (children's retelling)
- Strider's Universe, [Orbit] 1998, as Paul Barnett
- Encyclopedia of Walt Disney's Animated Characters, 1998 (third edition), as John Grant
- Enchanted World: The Art of Anne Sudworth, 2000, as John Grant
- Guts, 2001, as John Grant with David Langford
- Masters of Animation, 2001, as John Grant
- The World, 2001, as John Grant (re-issue)
- Albion, 2001, as John Grant (re-issue)
- The Paper Tiger Fantasy Art Gallery, 2002, as Paul Barnett
- Perceptualistics: The Art of Jael, 2002, as John Grant
- Dragonhenge, 2002, as John Grant with Bob Eggleton
- The Far Enough Window, 2002, as John Grant
- Qinmeartha and the Girl-Child LoChi, 2002, as John Grant, part of double book with The Tomb of the Old Ones by Colin Wilson
- The Chesley Awards For Science Fiction & Fantasy Art: A Retrospective, 2003, as John Grant with Elizabeth Humphrey and Pamela D. Scoville. ISBN 978-1-904332-10-7
- The Hundredfold Problem, 2003, as John Grant (re-issue)
- Earthdoom! 2003, as John Grant with David Langford (re-issue)
- Strange Pleasures 2, 2003, edited as John Grant with Dave Hutchinson
- Take No Prisoners, 2004, as John Grant; story collection
- Digital Art For the 21st Century, 2004, edited as John Grant with Audre Vysniauskas
- The Stardragons, 2005 as John Grant with Bob Eggleton
- Sci-Fi Movies, AAPPL 2006, as John Grant
- Noir Movies, AAPPL 2006, as John Grant
- Life-Size Dragons, 2006, as John Grant with Fred Gambino
- Animated Movies, AAPPL 2006, as John Grant
- Discarded Science: Ideas That Seemed Good at the Time..., Facts, Figures & Fun, 2006 ISBN 978-1-904332-49-7
- Beer, AAPPL, 2006, as Paul Barnett
- New Writings in the Fantastic, 2007, edited as John Grant
- Corrupted Science: Fraud, Ideology and Politics in Science, Facts, Figures & Fun, 2007 ISBN 978-1-904332-73-2
- The Dragons of Manhattan, 2008, as John Grant
- Leaving Fortusa, 2008, as John Grant
- The City In These Pages, PS Publishing, 2008, as John Grant
- Bogus Science: Or, Some People Really Believe These Things, Facts, Figures & Fun, 2009, ISBN 978-1-904332-87-9
- Denying Science: Conspiracy Theories, Media Distortions, and the War Against Reality, Prometheus Books, 2011, as John Grant
- Warm Words and Otherwise: A Blizzard of Book Reviews, Infinity Plus Books, 2011, as John Grant
- Legends of Lone Wolf Omnibus 1, Dark Quest Books, 2011, as John Grant with Joe Dever
- The Lonely Hunter, PS Publishing, 2012, as John Grant
- Earthdoom!, Dark Quest Books, 2012, as John Grant with David Langford (re-issue)
- A Comprehensive Encyclopedia of Film Noir: The Essential Reference Guide, Applause Theatre & Cinema Books, 2013, as John Grant
- Tell No Lies, Alchemy Press, 2014, as John Grant; story collection
- Debunk It!: How to Stay Sane in a World of Disinformation, Zest, 2014, as John Grant; reprinted as Bullsh*t, MJF Books, 2014, as John Grant
- Spooky Science: Debunking the Pseudoscience of the Afterlife, Sterling, 2015, as John Grant
- Eureka!: 50 Scientists who Shaped Human History, Zest, 2016, as John Grant
- Corrupted Science: Fraud, Ideology and Politics in Science (revised & expanded), See Sharp Press, 2017, as John Grant

=== Critical studies and reviews of Grant's work ===
Enchanted world

- De Lint, Charles (January 2001). "Books to Look For". F&SF. 100 (1): 24–28. Archived from the original on 27 December 2004.

== Awards and nominations ==
Year	Nominated work	Award	Category	Result
1994	The Encyclopedia of Science Fiction	BSFA Award	Special Award	Won
1996	The Glad Who Sang a Mermaid in from the Probability Sea	British Fantasy Award	Best Short Fiction	Nominated
1997	The Encyclopedia of Fantasy	Bram Stoker Award	Superior Achievement in Non-Fiction	Nominated
1998	The Encyclopedia of Fantasy	Hugo Award	Hugo Award for Best Related Work	Won
1998	The Encyclopedia of Fantasy	Locus Award	Best Non-Fiction	Won
1998	The Encyclopedia of Fantasy	Mythopoeic Awards	Mythopoeic Scholarship Award (for Myth and Fantasy Studies)	Won
1998	The Encyclopedia of Fantasy	World Fantasy Award	World Fantasy Special Award: Professional	Won
1999	The Encyclopedia of Fantasy	Eaton Award	J. Lloyd Eaton Scholarship Award	Won
2001	Paper Tiger Books	Chesley Awards	Chesley Award for Best Art Director	Won
2002	Paper Tiger Books	Locus Award	Best Editor	Nominated
2003	Dragonhenge	Hugo Award	Hugo Award for Best Related Work	Nominated
2003	Dragonhenge	Locus Award	Best Art Book	Nominated
2003	Paper Tiger Fantasy Art Gallery	Locus Award	Best Art Book	Nominated
2003	Perceptualistics	Locus Award	Best Art Book	Nominated
2003	Paper Tiger Books	World Fantasy Award	World Fantasy Special Award: Professional	Nominated
2004	The Chesley Awards for Science Fiction and Fantasy Art: A Retrospective	Hugo Award	Hugo Award for Best Related Work	Won
2004	The Chesley Awards for Science Fiction and Fantasy Art: A Retrospective	Locus Award	Best Non-Fiction/Art	Nominated
2008	New Writings in the Fantastic	British Fantasy Award	Best Anthology	Nominated
