= The Truth About the Flaming Ghoulies =

Novel by John Grant

The Truth About the Flaming Ghoulies is a novel by John Grant published in 1983.

== Plot summary ==
The Truth About the Flaming Ghoulies is a novel in which a group of rock musicians in the late 1980s detonate themselves and Chicago with a multimegaton blast.

== Reception ==
Dave Langford reviewed The Truth About the Flaming Ghoulies for White Dwarf #62, and stated that "Inevitably the ultimate revelation is a shaggy-dog joke, but there are plenty of laughs en route."
