= Malcolm Douglas (illustrator) =

British illustrator

- Born: 8 October 1954
- Died: 22 March 2009 (aged 54)
- Areas: Penciller, Inker, Colourist
- Pseudonym: J. T. Dogg
- Notable works: Ham Dare

Malcolm Douglas (8 October 1954 – 22 March 2009) was an illustrator. He died aged 54 in March 2009.

== Biography ==
He was educated at Trinity School of John Whitgift and Sheffield University where he volunteered to illustrate a student union newspaper, the main character of which was one "Norman Density", a decision which sparked his career as an illustrator. His work could be found in many diverse publications perhaps the best known was in the comic Oink; he was also the illustrator of the character 'Fred the Red', in the Manchester United match programmes.

== Bibliography ==
Comics work includes:

- Ham Dare, Pig of the Future (with Lew Stringer, in Oink!)
- The Street-Hogs! (with writer Mark Rodgers, in Oink!)
