= Poot! =

British adult comics magazine

Poot! was an adult British comics magazine which ran between 1985 and 1990. It had the tagline "silly cartoons and smart-arse satire for grown ups". The first edition was published in 1985 with a run of 500 copies. The comic grew to around 50,000 per issue up until the time of its cessation in 1990, due to the publishers getting proper jobs and the distributor going bust. Publication resumed in September 2009 after a gap of 19 years for a further two years until the new distributor went bust as well. Poot! billed itself as "Probably Britain's silliest comic".

== Contents ==
- Sven the Saxophone, who nominally edits the magazine with his sidekick, Nigel the Orange. Drawn by Tim Westall, who founded the comic at Birmingham University in the 1980s.
- Desmond Hoo, a single, jobless 31-year-old man from Birkenhead who thinks he is Doctor Who. Drawn by Jim Whittaker.
- Young Fred Crombie the Undead Zombie. A teenage member of the living dead with a penchant for chainsaws and extreme violence.
- Arnold The Anus. A body part with legs.
- Short Fat Ugly Bald Stupid Man. A middle-aged superhero. Drawn by Alex Foulds.
- Ed Case. A teenage detective. Drawn by Alex Foulds.
- Timmy the Tampon. A tampon with legs and chubby arms. Drawn by Tim Westall.
- Winston the Cuddly Christmas Pudding. Drawn by Tim Westall
- Plopper Jenkins
- The Business Studies Kids
- The Cabbage Kid
- Hank E Wankie
- Johnny Condom
- Norman Neanderthal
- Enoch the Angel

Many other artists have contributed to Poot!. They include Jonathan Lemon, Anthony Smith, Neil Nixon, Lectrr, and Lee James Turnock.
