= The Freshies =

British punk band

- Origin: Manchester, England
- Genres: Punk rock, power pop, new wave
- Years active: 1978–1982, 2010, 2012, 2019–present
- Labels: Razz, MCA, Stiff
- Members: Barry Spencer; Rick Sarko; Paul Taylor; Chris Connolly
- Past members: Chris Sievey; Martin Jackson; Billy Duffy; Eddie Carter; Bob Dixon; Mike Doherty; Lyn Oakey; Steve Hopkins; Paul Whittall; Paul Burgess; Rick Maunder; Barbara O'Donovan; Harry Sievey

The Freshies are an English punk rock / power pop band, formed in Manchester in 1978. The band was founded by singer-songwriter and comedian Chris Sievey, whose best-known creation, comedy character Frank Sidebottom, originated as a mascot for the group.

Over a four-year period between their formation and break-up in 1982, the Freshies released several singles, as well as three studio albums.

Since Sievey's death in 2010, the Freshies reformed for sporadic appearances at tribute events to their founder; these occasionally included his son Harry Sievey on lead vocals and guitar, until his death in 2017.

Original members Barry Spencer and Rick Sarko reformed the band permanently in 2019, following the release of the documentary Being Frank: The Chris Sievey Story. This lineup of the Freshies includes Paul Taylor (guitar) and Chris Connolly (drums). In 2020, the band announced plans to release their first new material since 1982.

== Career ==
Chris Sievey had recorded since the early 1970s, and released two cassettes under his own name before starting the Bees Knees in 1972 with bass guitarist Paul Burke which they renamed the Freshies in 1974. According to Sievey, when the band were looking for a guitarist, a fourteen-year-old Johnny Marr appeared at his house wanting to join the band but was told that he was too young. The Freshies EP was released in 1978 on Sievey's own Razz record label, and was followed later that year by the hopefully titled Straight In at No. 2 EP. Others who played with Sievey included, in the early lineup, Martin Jackson (later with Magazine and Swing Out Sister) and Billy Duffy (later with the Cult). In 1978, the band included Barry Spencer (guitar), Eddie Carter (guitar), and Bob Dixon (drums). By 1979, the band was Sievey, Spencer, Rick Sarko (bass, ex-the Nosebleeds) and Mike Doherty (drums, ex-the Smirks). Others who played in the band include Lyn Oakey (guitar), Steve Hopkins (keyboards), Paul Whittall (keyboards), Paul Burgess (drums), and Rick Maunder (bass).

The band's biggest selling single and best known song is 1980's "I'm in Love with the Girl on the Manchester Virgin Megastore Check-out Desk", renamed as "I'm in Love with the Girl on a Certain Manchester Megastore Check-out Desk" on request from Radio 1 (a version with "Virgin" bleeped out to allow it to be played on the radio without being considered advertising was also released), which reached number 54 on the UK Singles Chart in February 1981 after being picked up by MCA, eventually selling over 40,000 copies. At the time, the girl who was the subject of the song was frequently asked by fans to autograph copies of the single. The single's success prompted Richard Branson to undertake a search for the former checkout girl in question in 2006, wishing to invite her to the opening of the new Virgin Megastore in Manchester, in recognition of the role she played in the history of the original store.

Sievey pre-dated the self-financing ethic of punk when he created his own record label Razz in 1974. Razz went on to release over 60 titles, including much of the Freshies material. They also produced the first multi-media single by including The Biz, a ZX Spectrum game, on the tape version of one of their singles, something which Sievey later did himself as a solo artist with his 45 RPM single "Camouflage" (which included the Spectrum game Flying Train).

The Freshies split up in February 1982. Sievey continued with the Freshies name for a while, working as a duo with Barbara O'Donovan, and released the "Fasten Your Seatbelts" single (as the Freshies) in September 1982 and "Camouflage" (under his own name) in 1983. Sievey later found fame as Frank Sidebottom.

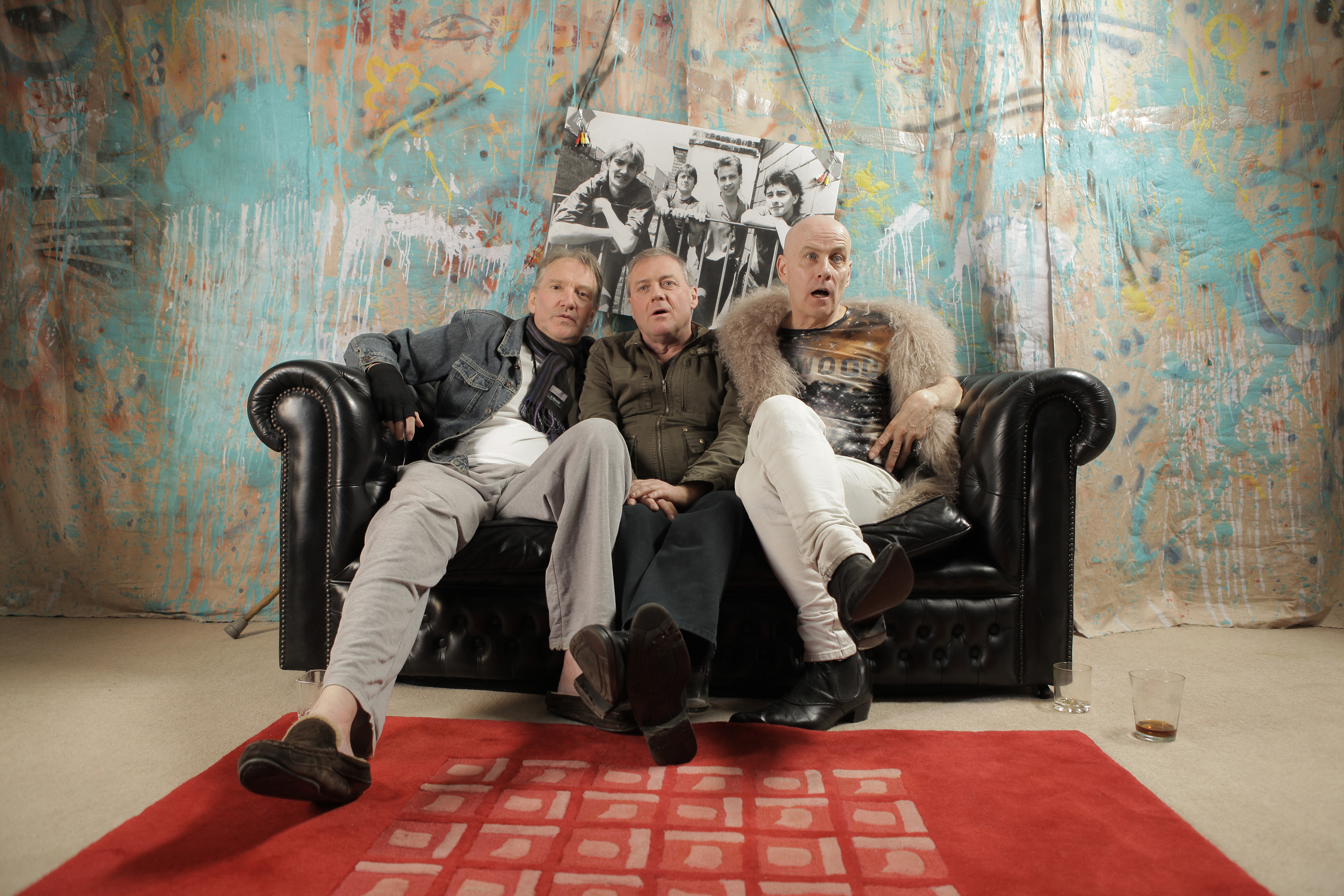
Three members of the Freshies in a 2019 documentary commemorating Sievey's work

Sievey died on 21 June 2010 in Hale, Greater Manchester, at the age of 54. He had been suffering from cancer.

== Discography ==
=== Albums ===
Year	Title	Label	Notes
1978	All Sleeps Secrets	Razz Records	
1978	Manchester Plays	Stick It in Your Ear!	Promo album
1979	The Freshies Sing the Girls from Banana Island Whose Stupid Ideas Never Caught On in the Western World as We Know It	Razz Records	
1980	Rough 'N' Ready	Razz Records	
1981	London Plays	Razz Records	Promo album
1985	The Johnny Radar Story	11:37	
1985	Studio Out-Takes	11:37	Outtakes collection

Compilations

Year	Title	Label	Notes
1982	In Love With...	Razz	
1985	Early Razz	11:37	With Chris Sievey
2005	The Very Very Best Of... Some Long and Short Titles	Cherry Red	
2013	Early Singles	1977	Box set of six 7 inches

=== EPs ===
Year	Title	Label	Note
1978	Washed Up / Moon Midsummer	Razz	Split 7" with Chris Sievey
1979	Straight In at No. 2	Razz	
1979	The Men from Banana Island Whos Stupid Ideas Never Caught On in the Western World as We Know It	Razz	
1980	Wrap Up the Rockets	Razz	
1984	Untitled	Virgin	With Chris Sievey

=== Singles ===
Year	Title	Label	Note
1980	"My Tape's Gone / Moonmid Summer"	Razz	
1980	"We're Like You / Hey"	Razz	Split 7" with Chris Sievey
1980	"Yellow Spot / If Its News"	Razz	
1980	"Oh Girl / No Money"	Razz	
1980	"I'm in Love with the Girl on the Manchester Virgin Megastore Checkout Desk"	MCA	
1981	"I'm in Love with the Girl on a Certain Manchester Megastore Checkout Desk"	MCA	Charted at 54 on the UK Singles Chart, 14 February 1981
1981	"Wrap Up the Rockets"	MCA	
1981	"I Can't Get "Bouncing Babies" by the Teardrop Explodes" / "Tell Her I'm Ill"	MCA	
1981	"Dancin' Doctors / One to One"	Razz	
1982	"If You Really Love Me, Buy Me a Shirt" / "I Am the Walrus"	CV	
1982	"Fasten Your Seat Belts" / "Best We Can Do"	Stiff	

=== VHS ===
- Razzvizz 2 (1981), Razz

== Lineup ==
On the Freshies' first release, 1977's All Sleep's Secrets, Sievey was the only credited artist. The earliest known line up of the band beyond just Sievey also consists of Barry Spencer on vocals and guitar, Paul Whittle on keyboards, Richard Maunder on bass, and Bob Dixon on drums. This is the lineup featured on the 1978 promo cassette Manchester Plays. The 1979 Banana Island album credits a similar line-up, minus Paul Whittle who is replaced by Sievey on keyboards. In 1980, Bob Dixon was replaced by Neil Tomkinson on drums for the "Yellow Spot" and "My Tape's Gone" singles, before himself being replaced by Mike Doherty for the Rough N Ready mini-album. Also replaced for the mini-album was Richard Maunder on bass guitar, who was replaced with Rick Sarko. This line up played on two 1981 singles; "Dancin' Doctors" and "If You Really Love Me, Buy Me a Shirt", before breaking up. In 1982, Sievey released a single with Barbara O'Donovan under the name the Freshies, titled "Fasten Your Seatbelts". In 1984, he released an untitled solo EP as the Freshies, and in 1985 issued The Johnny Radar Story, as the Freshies.
