= Mick Middles =

British music journalist

Mick Middles is a British music journalist. He has written for many newspapers and magazines and is the author of many books about music, several relating to Factory Records, Tony Wilson, Joy Division and Ian Curtis, and he is the authorised biographer of Frank Sidebottom.

== Life and career ==
In the 1970s and 1980s he was the Manchester correspondent for Sounds. He has also written for The Face, The Guardian, Daily Telegraph, Mail on Sunday and Daily Express. As well as music biographies, he has written books about comedians Les Dawson and Frankie Howerd. He lives in Flixton with his wife, Vicky.

== Books ==
Middles's work includes:

- The Fall (2003), co-written with Mark E. Smith
- Torn Apart (2006), co-written with Lindsay Reade
- Factory: The Story of the Record Label (2009)
- Frank Sidebottom Out of His Head: The Authorised Biography of Chris Sievey (2014)
