= Rosie Holt =

British comedian and satirist

- Born: July 1985 (age 41)
- Education: LAMDA
- Occupations: Comedian; actress; screenwriter
- Years active: 2005–present
- Agent: Sophie Chapman Talent Ltd
- Website: rosieholt.co.uk

Rosie Holt (born July 1985) is a British actress, comedian and satirist. She started her satirical videos, Woman Who..., released on her Twitter feed, during the 2020 COVID-19 lockdown. The Guardian newspaper noted her "strong line in parodies of the [type of] political speech that veers into drivel."

== Early life ==
Holt grew up in Somerset, in the west of England, and studied at the London Academy of Music and Dramatic Art.

== Career ==
In August 2013, Holt's entry in The Sitcom Trials, 'Never Better', was selected as winner. Holt jointly wrote and performed as part of the double act Holt and Talbot, alongside Christian Talbot, at the Edinburgh Festival Fringe in both 2017 and 2018. Holt is one of several satirists who subsequently found a popular online niche for her art during the COVID-19 pandemic.

=== Radio ===
She appeared on BBC Radio 4's The Museum of Curiosity in February 2023. Her hypothetical donation to this imaginary museum was "the unwritten second half of Coleridge's Kubla Khan".

=== Online work ===
In October 2021, Holt was interviewed about her success online as part of a Backstage magazine article. She also appeared in an online educational workshop aimed at Buckinghamshire schools, using the short-form comedic video as an example of a new method of communication.

In August 2021, the dating app Hinge had identified her younger brother, Charlie, as her "most compatible match". Her tweet relaying the story attracted 23,000 likes within two days, and some press coverage.

January 2022 was a period of intense political controversy about Partygate, and an official report was expected from the Cabinet Office Second Permanent Secretary, Sue Gray. In a satirical video sketch released to Twitter, Holt played the part of a Tory MP being asked by an interviewer whether she had or had not attended a Downing Street party. The video was created by splicing the interviewee's responses with actual footage of questions from a Sky News reporter to Boris Johnson, in which he had dodged questions about whether he had gone to the party. Her response – that until Sue Gray completes her report "your guess is as good as mine: I don't know whether I attended the party" – generated an outraged response from some viewers who missed the satire and who thought that the interviewee was a real MP.

== Personal life ==
In 2024, Holt was in a relationship with fellow comedian Stewart Lee, but had split up by 2026. She previously shared a house with comedian Harriet Kemsley.

== Credits ==
=== Radio ===
- 2023 Amber Jolt: Truth Hunter (Amazon: Prime or Prime-evil?), Amber Jolt, BBC Radio 4

=== Television ===
- 2019 Bounty (pilot), Jess, Channel 4
- 2021 The Russell Howard Hour, Margaret/Jenny, Avalon/Sky

=== Theatre ===
- 2005 Prometheus Bound, Chorus, Sound Theatre
- 2005 Myth Propaganda and Destruction, Marguerite, Contact Theatre
- 2010 Lashings Of Whipped Cream, Trixie, The Nursery Festival
- 2011 Wuthering Heights, Catherine Earnshaw, Aberystwyth Arts Centre, National Tour
- 2011 Romeo and Juliet, Juliet, New Triad Theatre, European Tour
- 2015 Treasure Island, Jim /Gemima, Creation Theatre
- 2019 The Crown Dual, HRH Queen Elizabeth II, Edinburgh Festival
- 2019 The Crown Dual, HRH Queen Elizabeth II, Wiltons Music Hall

=== Comedy ===
- 2014 Fall Girl, Writer / Performer, Canal Cafe Theatre
- 2014 Fall Girl, Writer / Performer, Gilded Balloon
- 2017 Holt & Talbot Can't Stand The Sight Of Each Other, Writer / Performer, Edinburgh Fringe
- 2018 Some Like It Holt, Writer / Performer, Edinburgh Fringe
- 2018 Mansplaining Feminism, Writer / Performer, Bath Komedia
- 2018 Mansplaining Feminism, Writer / Performer, Edinburgh Fringe
- 2020 Webidate, Writer / Performer, Web Series
- 2021 Woman Who..., Writer / Performer, Twitter
- 2022 The Woman's Hour, Writer / Performer, Edinburgh Fringe
