= Round the Bend =

- Genre: Satirical children's television series
- Created by: Patrick Gallagher; Tony Husband; Mark Rodgers
- Written by: Patrick Gallagher; Tony Husband
- Directed by: John Henderson
- Starring: Anthony Asbury; Simon Buckley (Series 2-3); Richard Coombs (Series 1-2); Alistair Fullarton (Series 1); Barnaby Harrison (Series 2-3); Nigel Plaskitt; Kaefan Shaw; John Wheatley (Series 3); Tony Robinson (one episode, Series 1); Aswad (one episode, Series 1); John Fashanu (one episode, Series 1)
- Voices of: Jon Glover; Jonathan Kydd; Philip Pope; Enn Reitel; Kate Robbins; Susan Sheridan
- Composers: Philip Pope; Simon Franglen; Big George (Series 3)
- Country of origin: United Kingdom
- Original language: English
- No. of series: 3
- No. of episodes: 18

Production
- Executive producer: Denise O'Donoghue
- Producer: John Henderson
- Cinematography: Martin Hawkins (Series 1); Albert Almond (Series 2-3)
- Editors: Mike Cross (Series 1); Mykola Pawluk (Series 2-3)
- Camera setup: Martin Hawkins (Series 1); Albert Almond (Series 2-3)
- Running time: 20 minutes
- Production companies: Hat Trick Productions; Yorkshire Television

Original release
- Network: ITV (CITV)
- Release: January 6, 1989 – May 7, 1991

Round the Bend! is a satirical British children's television series, which ran on Children's ITV for three series from 6 January 1989, to 7 May 1991. The programme was produced by Hat Trick Productions for Yorkshire Television. After its first run concluded, it was later repeated on Channel 4, The Children's Channel and Nickelodeon UK (the "Yorkshire Television Production" and "A Yorkshire Television Production for ITV" company logos were also removed from the end of the episodes in each case, and they would just fade to black where they originally were), and was nominated for an RTS Award.

The programme was created by the team behind the comic book magazine Oink! (Patrick Gallagher, Tony Husband, and Mark Rodgers). The puppets, animated characters and main sewer set were designed by Gallagher, who was also the programme's graphic designer. The puppets were made by the team who made the ones for Central Television's Spitting Image. Round the Bend! was a satirical parody of Saturday morning magazine shows, with a host providing linking material between cartoons, music videos and news reports (albeit set in a sewer). The anarchic tone of the programme and its parody cartoons was like that of Viz. The animated sketches were produced by Catalyst Pictures (who made the crudely drawn cel animations and stop-motion cardboard animations) and Aardman Animations (who made the clay-animated serials, all three of which were spoofs of B-movies).

The title of the programme is a double entendre. Referring to a toilet U-bend, it was also a popular saying at the time to describe someone who was insane. The cel-animated opening titles began with the camera being flushed down a toilet and ending up in a sewer (for the first series' opening titles, a live-action boy also sat at his kitchen table waiting for his copy of the Round the Bend! comic to be delivered, and when his mother grabbed it after it came through the letterbox just before he could, he mouthed something that made the comic give her an electric shock and forced her to drop it, and the view then changed to the now-fully-animated shot of the comic's front cover).

== Main characters ==
- Doc Croc: The show's host and a temperamental, rude, and overbearing crocodile. He ran the operations of the sewer and took command of the rats who worked (unpaid) for him. Performed by Anthony Asbury and Kaefan Shaw, and voiced by Enn Reitel. In one episode, he started his own political party to try and win the general election (which he named the "Greedy Party"), but lost it by one vote to "Screaming Lord Screwloose" (the candidate for the "Monster Robot Loony Party") as the rats had forgotten to vote.
- Jemima Wellington-Green: The cleverest of the three rats, she was often sarcastic and miserable about the fact that she worked in a sewer and had no hope of ever getting a boyfriend. She spoke with a posh accent, which was a parody of Janet Street-Porter. Performed by Richard Coombs and voiced by Kate Robbins. In the first three episodes, she came up out of the toilets of actor Tony Robinson, reggae band Aswad and footballer John Fashanu to interview them, but they all flushed her away.
- "Vaudeville" Vincent Vermin: A cockney rat and the resident comic who always tried to see the bright side of every situation. He hosted his own joke segment of the show. The jokes were intentionally bad, which was the reason for them being funny. At the end of each segment, Doc Croc would ask an "Opinion Poll" (a talking barber's pole) what he thought of them, and the pole would say "Rubbish!". There was also at one point a talking piece of furniture, the "Armchair Critic". Performed by Nigel Plaskitt and voiced by Jon Glover. In one episode, he was blasted into space in a space shuttle that Doc Croc had stolen for the intention of broadcasting Round the Bend! to the whole world, only for Vincent to realise he wouldn’t have long to live doing this, so decided to “die laughing” by broadcasting his jokes using the satellite, which took over every television and radio signal going.
- Luschetti "Lou Brush" Bruschetti: an Italian rat and the programme's resident artist. Not as intelligent as the other rats, and usually the rat that Doc took most of his problems out on. Originally performed by Alistair Fullarton, later by Simon Buckley, and voiced by Jonathan Kydd. In one episode, he concocted a brew for Doc Croc (to try and put him in a better mood), but it shrunk him when he drunk it.

In three episodes, the cast were plagued by a sunglasses-wearing teddy bear who, despite his diminutive size, would inflict severe physical beatings on them. On the second one of these occasions, the cast were also visited by the teddy's (much larger) father, who took on Doc Croc in a boxing match, and would have won had it not been for Luschetti making a "big brother" crocodile out of cardboard (with Jemima impersonating Doc's voice when Luschetti projected its silhouette onto the wall of the sewer) to frighten both teddies away.

== Other characters ==
Other non-regular cast members were often satirical parodies of real-life celebrities and existing television programmes, including:

- The Oddbod Family: Original animation about a family of five, focusing on their three children (Bouncing Benny, Loud Lucy and Nancy's Nose) who all had abnormal abilities.
- Transformaloids and Transformabots: Animated parodies of Transformers, the first of which featured "Octopus Slime", an octopus-headed transforming robot (whose name is a pun on Optimus Prime), who on at least one occasion went up against his arch-enemy, "Armadillotron" (whose name is a pun on Megatron).
- The Strange Tales of Pzycho the Magnificent (Series 1–2): Original stop-motion cardboard animation about a psychotic German magician who attempted to use magic for his own personal gain, but got caught by the police every time and sent to jail. For the third series, Pzycho was presumed to be dead as a gravestone reading "RIP PZYCHO" was seen in one of the Woolly the Wonder Sheep sketches (but in the last episode's Kenny McTickle sketch, he reappeared when Kenny conjured up everything he had from under his kilt).
- Doc Croc's Nursery Spot (Series 1): Animated take-offs of The Care Bears ("The Couldn't-Care-Less Bears"), Mr. Men ("Masters and Missuses"), Thomas the Tank Engine and Friends ("Clarence the Crank Engine"), Rupert the Bear ("Poopert the Bear"), and Noddy ("The Adventures of Nuddy"). Replaced in the second series by Nursery Crimes (an animated parody of Jackanory, which spoofed well-known nursery rhymes), which in turn was replaced in the third series by Fairytales of the Unexpected (an animated parody of Tales of the Unexpected, which, as its name suggested, spoofed fairy tales).
- John Potato's Newsround: A parody of John Craven's Newsround, but presented by a potato (the eponymous "John Potato", who had eyes, a nose and a moustache from a Mr. Potato Head). The sports section was presented by "David Colemole", a puppet mole who wore a pair of round glasses and had a voice very similar to David Coleman. In three episodes, David Colemole became "Timmy Molett" (a parody of Timmy Mallett) when "The Rattles" took the world by storm, "John Colemole" (a parody of John Cole) when Doc Croc had started the "Greedy Party", and "Sir Patrick Mole" (a parody of Sir Patrick Moore).
- Ricky, Spambo, Arizona Jones, and Special Agent James Bomb (Series 1): Animated take-offs of Rocky, Rambo, Indiana Jones, and James Bond.
- Rubbish Rock Spot: A music video segment that had the puppets "Dross", "Kylie Manure", "Paul Muckartney", "Swill Collins", "Rick Ashtray", "Muddonna", "Sneezy Wonder", "Binanarama", "Stink", "Elton the John", "Jason Dungovan", "Michael Jackdung", "Jon Pong Jovi", "WC Splash and the Sucker MCs", "Kate Brush" and "Bin Lids on the Block", parodies (in name only) of Bros, Kylie Minogue, Paul McCartney, Phil Collins, Rick Astley, Madonna, Stevie Wonder, Bananarama, Sting, Elton John, Jason Donovan, Michael Jackson, Jon Bon Jovi, MC Hammer, Kate Bush and New Kids on the Block. Each had a mouth that would sing along to parodied versions of pop songs (and for one episode, the rats also formed their own rock band named "The Rattles", a pun on The Beatles).
- False Teeth from Beyond the Stars (Series 1), Attack of the Atomic Banana (Series 2), and False Teeth from Beyond the Stars Meet Atom Banana (Series 3): A trio of clay-animated B-movie parody serials, fictionally produced by "Unidental" (a pun on Universal), "Stubby Broccoli" and "Samuel J. Greengrocer" (a pun on Cubby Broccoli, and Samuel J. Briskin), and "Incredibly Cheap Productions" in association with "We Could Use This Set For Something Else P.L.C.". The first featured Roger Prentice, an apprentice dentist, and his assistant Lily O'Lovely trying to stop an invasion of intergalactic false teeth from eating the whole world, while the second featured a fifty-foot banana rampaging through New York City and three teenagers who enlisted the help of Marshal Marshal Marshal and Professor Brainsley Noggin to solve the "banana problem" in a style similar to Scooby-Doo by calling in King Kong to eat him. However, the third was a crossover between both of the first two, as the False Teeth had returned to try and eat the world again and only Atom Banana could stop them. These sketches were animated by Dave Alex Riddett of Aardman Animations.
- True Romance (Series 1): Original animation parodying romantic fiction stories. Every sketch would end with a punchline which was a reference to the last line of dialogue.
- Cosmic Comprehensive (Series 1): A stop-motion cardboard animation parodying The Bash Street Kids and Grange Hill about an intergalactic academy of aliens.
- Wee-Man and the Masters of the Looniverse and O.A.P.-Man: Animated parodies of He-Man and the Masters of the Universe. Based in the mystical land of "Hernia" (a pun on Eternia), Wee-Man fought against "Skeleton Face" (a spoof of Skeletor), while O.A.P.-Man (his father) fought against Skeleton Face's father "Grandad Skullface".
- Thunderpants: An animated parody of ThunderCats, which featured "Y-Fronto" (a spoof of Lion-O) leading their fights against "Bumm-Ra" (a spoof of Mumm-Ra).
- Karate Kiddie (Series 2): An animated parody of The Karate Kid, who returned to his ex-master's house and accidentally destroyed it with his overpowering strength.
- Vegetables (Series 2): A live-action parody of Neighbours, for which all the characters were vegetables with Mr. Potato Head pieces and Australian accents.
- Botman and Fatman (Series 2): Animated parodies of Batman (the eponymous character in the first of which, as his name implied, had abnormally huge buttocks).
- Tommy's Magic Time Trousers (Series 2): Original stop-motion cutout animation about a boy who could travel back in time to witness the causes of great historical events whenever he pulled on his talking green trousers. Many trouser-related puns were used, such as Tommy saying in the time-travelling sequence, "Tally-ho and away we go! The fly's the limit!" with the trousers replying "Brace yourself, Tommy!". Every sketch ended with Tommy returning to 1990 A.D. (then the present day), his teacher asking him something to determine if he had been paying attention, Tommy answering it based on what he had just witnessed, the teacher correcting him, and the trousers saying "If only he knew, Tommy! If only he knew!".
- Starry Trek (Series 2): An animated parody of Star Trek: The Original Series, set aboard the "Starship Rent-A-Prize" under the command of "Captain James T. Burke".
- Kenny McTickle and his Magic Kilt (Series 3): Original stop-motion cardboard animation about a Scottish boy who could conjure up anything from underneath his kilt. Kenny's catchphrase, "Oh, crivvens, jings and help ma bob!", was a reference to the Scots comic strip The Broons from The Sunday Post, as they were using those exclamations long before he did.
- Woolly the Wonder Sheep (Series 3): A stop-motion cardboard animation parodying Champion the Wonder Horse and the heroic dog Rin Tin Tin, the eponymous main character of which was voiced by Enn Reitel (impersonating Dustin Hoffman). Although Woolly proclaimed himself to be an "excellent sheep", he would often inadvertently enrage the people he had been trying to save by ruining their livelihoods, and they would chase him away while threatening to make kebabs out of him.
- Old-Age Useless Nitwit Tortoises and Teenage Mutant Ninja Toilets (Series 3): Animated parodies of the 1987 Teenage Mutant Ninja Turtles series, the eponymous main characters in the first of which fought against "Bottom Brain" (a spoof of Krang, who faced backwards out of his android).

== Merchandise ==
In 1990, a one-off tie-in magazine special was published as Round the Bend!: TV Special. A video game based on it, Round the Bend!: Doc Croc's Outrageous Adventures!, was produced by Zeppelin Games for the ZX Spectrum in 1991 and ported to the Commodore 64, Amiga, and Atari ST. A preview of a sequel was also released, but it was never finished.

== Global broadcasters ==
- United Kingdom
  - ITV (1989-1991)
  - Channel 4
  - The Children's Channel
  - Nickelodeon
- Australia
  - ABC (1990-1996)
- Republic of Ireland
  - RTÉ One (1990)
  - RTÉ Two (1992-1993)
- Germany
  - BFBS
  - SSVC Television
- Cyprus
  - BFBS
  - SSVC Television
- New Zealand
  - TV2 (1989-1992)
- Falkland Islands
  - BFBS
  - SSVC Television
- Papua New Guinea
  - ABC (1990-1996, via broadcasting transmissions from Australia with the ABC as the only Australian television channel being shown in Papua New Guinea)
- Vanuatu
  - ABC (1992-1996, via broadcasting transmissions from Australia)

== See also ==
- Thunderpants (a 2002 British-German-American family comedy film, which has no connections to the animated Round the Bend! sketches of the same name)
