= The Scottish Falsetto Sock Puppet Theatre =

Scottish comedy act

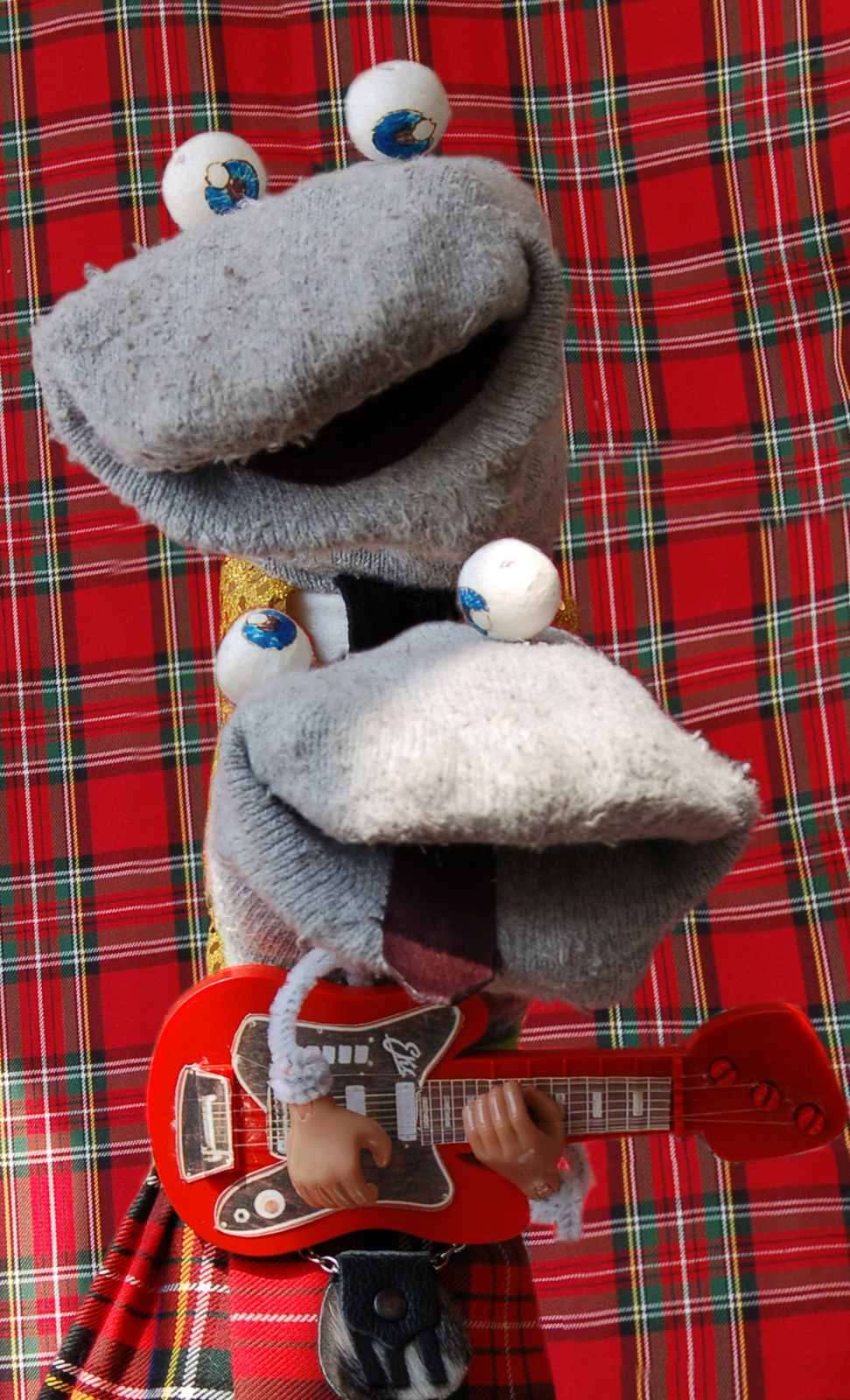
- Born: Created Autumn 2005; Aberdeen, Scotland

Comedy career
- Medium: television, theatre, radio, comic books
- Genre: comedy
- Website: https://www.scottishfalsettosocks.com/

The Scottish Falsetto Sock Puppet Theatre is a comedy act that began in the United Kingdom in 2005 and has performed nationally and internationally since. They first appeared as part of The Sitcom Trials in London. They appeared in the Gilded Balloon at Edinburgh Festival Fringe in 2007, 2008, 2009, 2010, 2012, 2013, 2014, 2015, 2016, 2018, 2019 and 2022 attracting highly positive reviews. The act has toured nationally and internationally every year since 2008 including Australia, Holland, Denmark and the Channel Isles. Prestigious appearances have included the Cheltenham Literary Festival and the Edinburgh International Magic Festival. Many of the Scottish Falsetto Sock Puppet Theatre's routines use a dynamic inspired by manzai, with Right Hand Sock as the tsukkomi and Left Hand Sock (the one with the dopey tongue) as the boke.

They have appeared on BBC TV's The One Show, Comedy Shuffle, The Culture Show, Points West, GMTV, MTV, Current TV and Channel 4's Big Brother's Little Brother.

They were winners of the Bath Comedy Festival Best Joke Award 2018. Their show was nominated Best Show at the Leicester Comedy Festival Awards in 2009, and was the Winner of the Edinburgh Festival Insider Comedy Award 2009.

They have appeared in DVD extras on the DVD releases of three classic Doctor Who serials: The War Games in 2009, The Horns of Nimon and The Dominators in 2010.

Their show is written and performed by comedian and comic book creator Kev F. Sutherland, author of Bash Street Kids Adventures and creator of The Sitcom Trials.

Year	Show name	Notes
2007	The Scottish Falsetto Sock Puppet Theatre	Debut show at Gilded Balloon, followed by 18 date tour.
2008	Return of The Scottish Falsetto Sock Puppet Theatre	Gilded Balloon, followed by 36 date tour
2009	Scottish Falsetto Sock Puppet Theatre Goes To Hollywood	Gilded Balloon, followed by 28 date tour
2010	Scottish Falsetto Sock Puppet Theatre On The Telly	Gilded Balloon, followed by 32 date tour
2012	Scottish Falsetto Sock Puppet Theatre: Boo Lingerie! - A Socky Horror Show	Gilded Balloon, followed by tour
2012	Scottish Falsetto Sock Puppet Theatre: Chunky Woollen Nits	Gilded Balloon
2013	Scottish Falsetto Sock Puppet Theatre In Space	Gilded Balloon and tour
2014	Scottish Falsetto Sock Puppet Theatre: ...And So Am I	Gilded Balloon and tour
2015	Scottish Falsetto Sock Puppet Theatre: Minging Detectives	Gilded Balloon and tour
2016	Scottish Falsetto Sock Puppet Theatre Do Shakespeare	Gilded Balloon and tour
2018	Scottish Falsetto Sock Puppet Theatre: Superheroes	Gilded Balloon and tour
2019	Scottish Falsetto Sock Puppet Theatre: Roll Up!	Gilded Balloon
2020	Edinburgh Fringe Zoom Shows	Online
2022	Scottish Falsetto Socks: Eurovision Sock Contest	Gilded Balloon

Adelaide Fringe 2012
