= Brickman (surname) =

Brickman is a surname of English origin. Notable people with the surname include:

- Arlyne Brickman (1934–2020), American mafia informant and prostitute
- Jason Brickman (born 1991), American basketball player
- Jim Brickman (born 1961), American pianist and New Age composer
- Lester Brickman (born 1940), American law professor and legal scholar
- Marc Brickman (born 1953), American lighting designer
- Marshall Brickman (1941–2024), Brazilian-American screenwriter and banjo player
- Morrie Brickman (1917–1994), American cartoonist
- Paul Brickman (born 1949), American screenwriter and film director (Risky Business)

== Fictional ==
- Brickman (comic strip), a comic strip and character created by UK cartoonist Lew Stringer

== See also ==
- Brick Man, a proposed sculpture by Antony Gormley
