= Gas (comics) =

British adult comic (1989–1991)

- Cover of Vol.3 №8

Publication information
- Publisher: Galaxy Publications
- Schedule: Monthly
- Format: Comics anthology
- Genre: Humor/comedy
- Publication date: 1989 - 1991
- No. of issues: 24
- Main character(s): Thud 'n' Bud, Val Downer
- Editor: Bill Hampton

Gas was a British adult comic that was published monthly by Galaxy Publications from 1989 to 1991.

Gas was one of many such comics emulating the success of Viz, and like many of its peers (and unlike its upmarket siblings Brain Damage and Talking Turkey) was a crude copycat of the format Viz pioneered.

Initially, many strips were clearly rejected from Viz; with many set in Viz's fictional town of Fulchester, but with the 'F' tippexed out (thus Gas appeared to be set in Ulchester). These strips were often of extremely poor quality, both in terms of artwork and plotting.

As the title matured, however, strips submitted for Gas became more common and the production quality increased. A number of strips from Gas resurfaced in the comic UT which ran for 18 months from 1991.

Gas ran until Volume 3, number 10 (issue 34)

Strips included:

- The Gas Family - the title strip, an antisocial mother, father, and son, with offensive body odour
- Arthur Pilkington - Chartered Barbarian - Pilkington was a bespectacled barbarian accountant in the days of Genghis Khan who got up to many finance-related shenanigans. Written and drawn by David Leach, who later sold the same idea and redrew some of the same strips for the adult humour magazine UT. David also drew several of the later issue covers for Gas in the style of the great EC comics.
- Phallas The Soap Opera, Tales Of Nambygate and Hollywood Babbling by Kev F. Sutherland, who also drew many one-off strips for the comic.
- Val Downer by Kipps Webb - Adventures of a perpetual pessimist and depressive. Ended with the entire cast being killed off, but subsequently returned in UT.
- Star Squad - Science fiction strip by Charlie Brooker.
- The Scum - Strip by Geoff Thompson about the staff of a tabloid newspaper.
- The Famous Five were parodied in a regular strip which also sent up different art styles, ranging from Pre-Raphaelite to superhero comics.
- Roy of the Rogers - Footballing comic strip set in the Wild West, based on a meld of Roy of the Rovers and Roy Rogers.
- Senile Delinquents - misadventures of a group of pensioners.
- The Pigs - Cartoon about corrupt and violent police officers, drawn as pigs.
- Wor Jackie - A long running problem page featuring Jackie Charlton, at this time manager of the Republic of Ireland football squad. Readers would typically offer varied domestic problems, Charlton's answers would frequently liken all life's problems to events on a football pitch.
- Dan Dross - adult parody of Dan Dare, drawn by Malcolm Douglas.

The cartoonist Dave Colton contributed many 'one off' strips and cartoons to the comic, including a small strip about the inept GP, Doctor Bastard. Other frequent contributors included David Haldane, Anthony Smith, Ed McHenry and Davy Francis.
