= Jean Sutherland =

- Born: 6 January 1907; Glasgow, Scotland
- Died: 6 April 2006 (aged 99); Newburgh, Fife, Scotland
- Occupations: Writer, performer and photographer

Jean Sutherland (6 January 1907 – 6 April 2006) was a writer, performer and photographer, who was born in Glasgow but lived for most of her life in the village of Newburgh, in Fife, Scotland.

Her photographs of Fife locals and events appeared from the early 1960s to the 1990s in the Fife Herald and The Courier, for whom she contributed articles on the history of Newburgh.

A lifelong collector and performer of poems and songs, she performed from the 1960s with The Fife Yokels, recording a number of LPs and appearing on Grampian Television's Bothy Nichts programmes. Sutherland wrote a number of original songs, including "Among The Neeps" and "The Barley".
