= Kev F. Sutherland =

Scottish comedian and comic strip creator

Kev F Sutherland
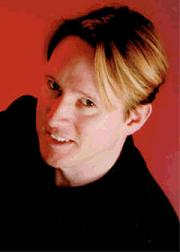
- Born: 18 October 1961 (age 64); Aberdeen, Scotland
- Notable work: The Sitcom Trials; The Beano; The Scottish Falsetto Sock Puppet Theatre

Comedy career
- Medium: television, theatre, radio, comic books
- Genre: comedy
- Website: comicfestival.co.uk

Kev F. Sutherland (born 18 October 1961) is a Scottish comedian, caricaturist, and comic strip creator. He has drawn for a variety of publications, including The Beano. He has produced several shows at the Edinburgh Festival Fringe, including The Sitcom Trials and The Scottish Falsetto Sock Puppet Theatre.

== Early life ==
He was born in Aberdeen and raised from age 6 in the village of Kibworth in Leicestershire. His paternal grandmother was the writer and photographer Jean Sutherland. In 1983 he graduated from Exeter College of Art and Design.

== Early career ==
Sutherland got his start in the world of British comics fandom, contributing artwork and humour columns to fanzines like BEM and Fantasy Advertiser in the late 1970s and early 1980s.

From 1993 to 1998, Sutherland shared a studio with Marvel & DC Comics artist Mark Buckingham.

From 1999 to 2004, he was the producer of the UK's Comic Festival in Bristol. Beginning as Comics 99, it included the National Comics Awards which he co-founded in 1997. For Comics 99, Sutherland produced The World's Biggest Comic which featured the work of 100 of the world's leading comic artists, auctioned to raise money for Comic Relief.

== Comics career ==
His comic strips appear in the UK comic The Beano, chiefly comedy adventures starring The Bash Street Kids, with Dennis The Menace, Roger the Dodger and Minnie the Minx. In 2011, Sutherland drew Match magazine's Galaxy Wanderers strip, and Find It in Doctor Who Adventures.

His debut graphic novel Findlay Macbeth was published in 2020, followed by The Prince Of Denmark Street, The Midsummer Night's Dream Team, Comic Tales From The Bible, and Richard The Third.

Sutherland's previous comic strip work includes Star Trek, Ghost Rider 2099 and Doctor Strange for Marvel Comics, UT which he also edited, Goosebumps for The Funday Times, educational illustration for Scholastic and HarperCollins, Zig and Zag's Zogazine, Red Dwarf Smegazine (both for Fleetway), and miscellaneous strips for Doctor Who Magazine, Oink, Viz, Gas, 2000AD, Warrior, Gladiators (based on the LWT TV series), The Worm The World's Longest Comic Strip and many more.

His self-published titles include The Hawk (1983), The Scottish Falsetto Sock Puppet Theatre comic (2008), Sinnerhound (2011), Hot Rod Cow (2011), and the local comic Captain Clevedon (2011).

In 2007 he wrote Billy the Cat vs General Jumbo in The Beano Annual. In 2008 his Bash St Zombies original art was exhibited as part of the Comic Timing exhibition at Harrods in London.

Since 2003, Sutherland has presented his Comic Art Masterclasses in schools and colleges, and festivals educating students from seven years old to adult in the art of the comic strip. He appears regularly in the media as an authority on comics. He has spoken about the use of comic art in education at a number of Boys Writing Conferences, in 2009 he helped devise a unit for a Creative & Media Diploma course, in 2011 he presented the first of the Stan Lee Excelsior Awards in Sheffield, and in 2012 he helped open the new gallery at the BRIT School in Croydon.

== Performance career ==
From 1994 to 2004, Sutherland was a regular compere at Bristol's Comedy Box, where he developed the audience interactive game show Win Some Beer.

He created The Sitcom Trials in 1999, on stage in London and Bristol, at the Edinburgh Fringe 2001, 2002 and 2004, and in Hollywood in 2005. It continues on stage at the Leicester Square Theatre in London's West End.

Since 2005, Sutherland has written, produced and performed as The Scottish Falsetto Sock Puppet Theatre, appearing at the Edinburgh Festival Fringe in 2007, 2008, 2009, 2010, 2012, 2103 - 16, 2018, 19, & 22 and in theatres internationally and on television. His TV work includes The Sitcom Trials and A-Z of Rude Health for ITV.

In 2009 he made an attempt at the Guinness World Record for telling jokes in one hour, in support of Comic Relief.

== Selected TV ==
- Battle of the Books (BBC)
- The One Show (BBC)
- The Sitcom Trials (ITV)
- A-Z of Rude Health (HTV)
- Comedy Shuffle (BBC) – as The Scottish Falsetto Sock Puppet Theatre
- The Culture Show (BBC) – as The Scottish Falsetto Sock Puppet Theatre

== Selected comics ==
- 2000 AD – very early (still at school) work on Captain Klep, 1981
- Oink – first published work 1988
- Gas (1989–1991) – Tales of Nambygate, Phallas The Soap Opera
- Red Dwarf Smegazine (1992–1994)
- UT (mid-1990s)
- The World's Biggest Comic (1999) – charity production for Comic Relief & Comics 99
- Goosebumps wrote strip adaptation in Funday Times
- Toxic – Hot Rod Cow (a character which has been referenced in Sutherland's Beano strips)
- The Beano – Parents Evening in Beano Annual 2007; Pluggy Love & Billy The Cat vs General Jumbo in Beano Annual 2008; Roger The Dodger's Reservoir Dodge in Beano Annual 2009. Notable stories in the weekly Beano include Ickle Bitty Werewolf on Bash Street (3320–3322), School's Out (3316–3319), The Night Before Christmas (3310), Invasion of the Beano Snatchers (3421–3424), At Her Majesty's Pleasure (3335), The Ofsted Inspector (3366–3369), Scary Story (3353–3356) and The Bash Street Zombies (3410–3412)
- Doctor Who Magazine
- Viz – wrote & drew Tarquin Hoylet, He Has To Go to the Toilet
- Doctor Strange, Star Trek, Werewolf by Night, Ghost Rider 2099 (Marvel)
