= Lew Stringer =

British comic artist

- Born: 22 March 1959 (age 67)
- Areas: Artist, writer

Lew Stringer (born 22 March 1959) is a British comic artist and scriptwriter.

== Biography ==
Stringer began his career from the late 1970s with a series of fanzines, many featuring his popular Brickman character; these were read by several professional creators (including Kevin O'Neill, Alan Moore and Dave Gibbons) who encouraged Stringer to try comics as a profession and Stringer recalls that "Alan Moore actually introduced me to one of the editors at Marvel UK – Bernie Jaye who was editor on The Daredevils".

He sold his first professional cartoon to Marvel UK (the British branch of Marvel Comics) in 1983 where it appeared in The Daredevils comic, after which he worked for a short time as art assistant to the cartoonist Mike Higgs (creator of Moonbird and The Cloak). Since then Stringer has freelanced for numerous British comics for various companies and audiences.

His best remembered creations are Tom Thug and Pete and His Pimple for Oink! comic (1986), which outlasted that comic and continued into Buster comic, and Combat Colin the halfwit hero who featured in Action Force and The Transformers comics. Prior to Colin joining Transformers, Stringer had written another, similarly slapstick, strip Robo-Capers for that title. Robo-Capers was replaced by Combat Colin when the reprints of American G.I. Joe strips were added to the Transformers comic. Robo-Capers returned for a single story, which featured Colin and his sidekick, in Issue No. 200. After a change of editorial direction in 1991, Marvel UK handed the rights of Combat Colin to Stringer and he has used him in small-press titles, such as the Combat Colin Special and Yampy Tales. On 30 September 2012, Combat Colin returned in an all-new story for the launch of new David Lloyd's new online comic Aces Weekly and two other new stories featuring the character have appeared there since.

Stringer has also worked as a writer on CiTV Tellytots; was one of the main writers on Sonic the Comic, where he created several fan-favourite characters and stories; and has been a long time artist/writer for Viz and many other publications. He has written Toxic!'s Team TOXIC! strip since the first issue (and drawn it since issue 15); this proved popular enough with the readers to gain two pages an issue and lead to other comic strips being brought in. In October 2012 reprints of Team Toxic began to appear in the magazine but brand new stories resumed in January 2014, concluding in February 2019.

He broke into the international market in 1997 creating the Suburban Satanists for the Norwegian comic Geek. From 1999 to 2007 those characters appeared in the Swedish comic book Herman Hedning.

In April 2005, Active Images published a collection – Brickman Begins – of all of Stringer's Brickman strips since 1979. In 2006, a brand new Brickman series began in the American comic book Elephantmen, published by Image Comics, and in 2007, Combat Colin became a guest star in the strip. The series concluded in Elephantmen No.24 in 2009. In September 2015 Stringer reprinted all 20 episodes in a self-published comic entitled Brickman Returns. Stringer has since self-published other comics that reprint his older material, such as a Derek the Troll / Rock Solid special and a Combat Colin mini-series.

He began freelancing for The Beano in 2007, drawing a Fred's Bed story for the Christmas issue and a one-off Ivy the Terrible strip for an issue in 2008. In October 2008 Stringer became the artist on a new strip, Super School which is about five superhero children and their non-superpowered teacher. He started drawing for The Dandy after its revamp in October 2010, providing the illustrations for Postman Prat and Kid Cops and writing and drawing The Dark Newt.

In 2014, Stringer announced that he would be contributing a regular new cartoon strip to Doctor Who Magazine.

In recent years, Stringer has scripted and illustrated Rasher and Joe King for The Beano and in 2018 began work on a revival of Big Eggo for that comic. He also created Sgt.Shouty of the Moon Force for independent comic The77, and Short Sharp Shocks for horror comic This Comic Is Haunted.

In late March 2025, Stringer announced he was semi-retirement from comics to spend time on his own publishing projects.

== Bibliography ==
- Brickman
- Robocapers (in Transformers UK)
- Sonic the Comic #30-31, 42, 46, 51-52, 54, 57, 63-65, 71, 75, 81, 83, 87, 93, 103, 112-113, 129-130
- Sonic the Poster Mag #5-6, 9
- Combat Colin (in Action Force #5-, 1987)
- Derek the Troll for Warlock Magazine. After the magazine's demise, the strip continued in Games Workshop's White Dwarf.
