= Herman Hedning =

Herman Hedning (lit. Herman the Heathen, known as Marwin Meathead in English editions) is a Swedish humorous comic strip, drawn and written by Jonas Darnell.

== History ==
Herman Hedning first appeared in 1988 in Fantomen, the Swedish edition of The Phantom. Since then Jonas Darnell has written over 700 strips, and a number of longer stories, typically 8-10 pages. About 680 have been translated into English. The first of 20 albums was released in 1990, and the first magazine in 1998. Since 1998 there have been 130 issues, eight per year, except for 1998 and 1999, with 2 and 6 issues respectively, and a few years where nine issues were published.

Herman Hedning is published in Sweden, Norway and Finland, and is a steady seller, outlasting many of its contemporaries.

== Main characters ==
The comic has three main protagonists, Herman Hedning (Marwin Meathead), Gammelman (Oldhead) and Lilleman (Shorthead).

Marwin Meathead is fat, sadistic, greedy, lazy and self-important, and possesses all the bad qualities imaginable in a human being. He always wears his helmet and carries a wooden club with a large nail through it, made of the core wood of an Arch-oak. He is continuously plotting against his two acquaintances, Oldhead and Shorthead. Despite his sadism, brutal nature and professed lack of intelligence, he is shown to be quite intelligent when it comes to certain subjects, as well as sometimes extremely cunning when it comes to making money, often by taking advantage of the trusting nature of others.

Shorthead is a kind, naive, nature-loving soul who wants to be everybody's friend, and is often the target for Marwin's sadistic plans. At times, however, he can be just as malicious towards Marwin, switching between pitying him and despising him, and being willing to let him suffer from the consequences of his actions.

Oldhead, who has glasses and a beard, is grumpy and blasé, and is usually happy to simply sit and watch Marwin and Shorthead exerting violence against each other. He often does so from his laboratory, where he invents various machines and devices to reform the world. Like the others, he is capable of extreme greed, malice and violent outbursts, putting others in danger if it benefits his research. Like Shorthead, however, he can also be very compassionate and kind, even towards Meathead. These instances are few and far between, though.

== Recurring characters ==
Supporting protagonists

- The Creator - A parody of the Christian god. With a large beard and an anonymous black line over his eyes, he is "Incredibly responsible for precisely everything on Earth", for which he uses a device called "The Holy Laptop", a computer capable of instantly creating almost anything.
- Ragnar - A large, purple dinosaur of undetermined species. Like Marwin, he enjoys drinking and fighting, and is the closest Marwin has to a friend, often participating in his schemes to antagonize people.
- Adam and Eve - Two humans that were created after Marwin, Oldhead and Shorthead. Their sons Kain and Abel resemble Marwin due to Marwin's presence and bad influence during Eve's pregnancy. They are neither allies nor evil, and show a disinterest in Oldhead and Shorthead, and contempt for Marwin.

Antagonists

- The devil - A parody of Satan, and the most frequently recurring villain in the comics. He is red, with horns, a long tail, and sometimes big wings and a moustache. He is evil, loves everything evil, and is always trying to make people suffer, though always failing miserably. He was originally an Angel who was testing a "Flaming Sword", when Marwin arrived, stole the sword and accidentally torched Angel's wings, making it impossible for him to get home. He was then ordered to create a "subterranean Sister-corporation", which he called Hell because it was "Hot as Hell".
- The Pandora-Department - A gigantic temple, filled with mummified bureaucrats, created by the devil in an earlier version of the creation as a multi-purpose Doomsday-device, in revenge for being kicked out of heaven. It created global collapse and world war simultaneously, forcing god to start over, and was hidden by the Devil as a virus on the Holy Laptop, to be recreated upon restart. It resembles and works like a multi-adapter for electricity, capable of connecting to any group, like a corporation, bank or soccer-club, and using complicated bureaucracy to render it instantly dysfunctional. The bureaucrats reappear from time to time as lawyers, court notaries and others.
- The Prime computer - A powerful Artificial Intelligence originally built by Oldhead to eliminate Marwin. It is destroyed repeatedly, but then reappears in later episodes to claim revenge.
- The Apocalypse - A personification of the complete destruction of the universe, he is skinny, dry and wears a horned helmet. He lives on the moon with four centaurs known as the four roadies of the apocalypse.
