= The Sitcom Trials =

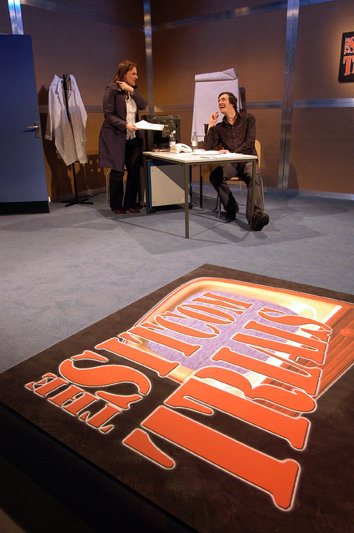
- Created by: Kev F Sutherland
- Presented by: Kev F Sutherland
- Starring: Wanda Opalinska, Dan March, Victoria Jeffrey, Louisa Gummer, Gerard Foster, Simon Wright, Neil Mullarkey, Richard Vranch, James Holmes +
- Country of origin: United Kingdom
- No. of series: 1
- No. of episodes: 8

Production
- Production locations: HTV Studios, Bath Road, Bristol
- Running time: 24–25 mins
- Production company: Carlton Productions

Original release
- Network: ITV / HTV West
- Release: 13 February – 11 April 2003

The Sitcom Trials is a stage and TV show devised, produced, and presented by Kev F. Sutherland. Beginning in Bristol in 1999, it showcases new sitcoms and comedy items in a head-to-head format. The audience then vote for the one they like best and only see the ending of the winner.

== History ==
The Sitcom Trials began life on stage in Bristol and London in 1999, its original venues being The Comedy Box in Bristol and the Comedy Pub (main venue 1999–2006) in London. Other London venues have included The Camden Head, Ophelia Dalston, the Leicester Square Theatre, the Canal Cafe Theatre, Finborough Theatre, Soho Theatre, Ealing Studios, The Green Room Club, and the Hen and Chickens Theatre.

The Sitcom Trials debuted at the Gilded Balloon venue at the Edinburgh Fringe in 2001, with a show starring Miranda Hart, returning in 2002 & 2004. The first TV series was a Carlton production for ITV/HTV, broadcast live from Bristol over eight weeks in 2003. The first Hollywood Sitcom Trials took place in 2005.

In 2008 the Sitcom Trials won the Fringe Report Award for Best Encourager of New Talent.

In 2013 and 2016 The Sitcom Trials returned to the Gilded Balloon at the Edinburgh Fringe as part of the So You Think You're Funny competition. Heats took place in London, Bristol, Cardiff, Manchester, Birmingham, Glasgow, and Edinburgh .

The stage show has been produced by Kev F Sutherland (99-present), Simon Wright & Declan Hill (07-09), James Parker (09-10), Vince Stadon (Bristol 2012–present) Lisa Parker, Michelle Ashton and Sean Mason (Manchester 09-present), Aaron Twitchen (Birmingham) and Colin McQuaid (Glasgow). The 2003 TV show was produced by Mark Ashton.

In 2010 Declan Hill and Simon Wright, who produced the Sitcom Trials in 2007 and 2009 launched a similar event called The Sitcom Mission.

At the 2004 Edinburgh Fringe The Sitcom Trials auctioned on eBay the chance to have your script in the show. This was won by Liam Mullone who starred in his own sitcom, along with Isy Suttie, Duncan Edwards, Ed Petrie and Andy Bone.

Performers who have appeared in The Sitcom Trials over the years include Miranda Hart, Neil Mullarkey, Richard Vranch, Suki Webster, Tony Robinson (Baldrick), Wanda Opalinska, Gerard Foster, Charity Trimm, Dominic Frisby, Waen Shepherd, Laura Solon, James Holmes, Justin Lee Collins, Russell Howard, Mark Olver, Aaron Barschak, Emily Lloyd, Danny Robins, Dan Tetsell, The Scottish Falsetto Sock Puppet Theatre, Rosie Holt, Lucy Porter, Nick Ewans, Louisa Gummer, Anne-Marie Draycott, Dan March, Rich Johnston, Anna Bennetts, Simon Treves, Steve McNeil and Sam Pamphilon.

Having written and appeared with Kev F. Sutherland in the predecessor of the Trials, Situations Vacant in 1996 (clip can be found on YouTube), Inbetweeners writer Iain Morris went on to name one of the main characters in the series (Neil's dad) Kevin Sutherland.

== Miranda ==
Miranda Hart's eponymous sitcom, now on BBC 2, first appeared as part of The Sitcom Trials at the Edinburgh Fringe in 2001. It featured Miranda, working in a joke shop that sells penis pasta, with a diminutive blonde sidekick, originally played by Charity Trimm, and the love interest in the café, played then by Gerard Foster. The camp character played in 01 by Dan Clegg went on to be played in the TV series by James Holmes who, coincidentally, was the star of the 2002 Edinburgh Fringe Sitcom Trials.

== Competition seasons ==
The Sitcom Trials has run a number of competition seasons, with heats and a grand final, in 2007, 2009, 2013 and 2016. 2013 and 2016's's seasons were part of the So You Think You're Funny competition, with heats in London, Manchester, Bristol (13), Cardiff (16), Birmingham (16) and Glasgow (16) and a grand final at the Edinburgh Fringe. 2013's final was won by Rosie Holt's sitcom Never Better, and 2016's final by Like-A-Looks by Kate Bowes-Renna and Vanessa-Faye Stanley.

The winner of the 2009 10th Anniversary Season was End To End by Steve McNeil & Sam Pamphilon. Spring 2009's winner was Riga To Rotherham by Dean Hardman. Autumn 07's winner was New Zealand team sitcom Sweet As.

Judges at the 2009 10th Anniversary Sitcom Trials in London included David Quantick, Iain Morris, Bill Dare, Katie Tyrell, David Schneider, Laura Lawson, Ashley Blaker, Daniel Maier, Nev Fountain, Carrie Quinlan, Michelle Farr, Marc Blake and Tom Price..

Reviews for the show have ranged from the Leicester Mercury's "We were screaming with laughter... move over Friends", through the London Evening Standard's "We're not watching stand-up, we're watching comedy history", to Chortle's "The Sitcom Trials are performing a vital service". There was also Metro's notorious review of the 2002 Edinburgh Fringe show: "I would happily have voted to have my own eyes gouged out with hot spoons rather than endure another moment."

== Episode guide TV series 1 ==
- Episode 1 – "Policevets in Casualty vs Do You Think They'll Cotton On?"

Police comedy by Stephen Dinsdale, vs Brian Meenagh's behind the scenes TV producers. All episodes hosted by Kev F Sutherland.

- Episode 2 – "Go Wild in the Country vs The Client"

Divorcee returns to school reunion, by Jane Simon, vs office romance & ructions by Harris, Blakewill & Wainwright

- Episode 3 – "Cardinal Sin vs Nemesis"

Two historical costume comedies by Andrew Barclay and Sam Elsden

- Episode 4 – "Improv Special"

The Comedy Store Players Neil Mullarkey, Suki Webster, Niall Ashdown & Richard Vranch present two contrasting sitcoms from audience suggestions.

- Episode 5 – "What An Anchor vs A Producers Tale"

Behind the scenes with an anchorman, by Adrian Peck & John Kelly, and a dysfunctional producer, by Roland Moore

- Episode 6 – "Jimmy James vs on the Job"

A solo writer-performed sitcom with multiple characters by James Holmes, vs HTV's Television Workshop's group creation

- Episode 7 – "Perfect 10 vs Football R For Revenge"

Political shenanigans at No 10 by Rich Johnston, vs terror on the terrace by Matt Bowdler & Ben Manning

- Episode 8 – "The public vs the public"

Two scripts selected from entries sent in by the viewers, head to head

== The Sitcom Mission ==
Declan Hill and Simon Wright, who produced the Sitcom Trials in 2007 and 2009 launched a similar event called The Sitcom Mission, the first Grand Final of which was in the New Diorama Theatre on Monday 31 May 2010. In Feb 2011 Hat Trick Productions announced their support of the 2011 Sitcom Mission season
