= The Encyclopedia of Fantasy and Science Fiction Art Techniques =

- Author: John Grant and Ron Tiner
- Publication date: 1996

The Encyclopedia of Fantasy and Science Fiction Art Techniques is a book authored by John Grant and Ron Tiner published by Titan Books in 1996.

== Contents ==
The Encyclopedia of Fantasy and Science Fiction Art Techniques is a book which focused on developing artistic concepts and techniques in the fantasy genre.

== Reception ==
David Atkinson reviewed the work for Arcane magazine, rating it an 8 out of 10 overall. Atkinson comments that "This book is a place to start and develop, but it is worth remembering that all artists have to be born with talent. Even a good book can't give it."

== Reviews ==
- Review by Carolyn Cushman (1996) in Locus, #425 June 1996
- Review by Roddy Williams (1997) in The Zone and Premonitions, Winter 1997-98
- Review by Steve Jeffery (1998) in Vector 197
