= Tony Husband =

British cartoonist (1950–2023)

- Born: William Anthony Husband; 28 August 1950; Blackpool, England
- Died: 18 October 2023 (aged 73); London, England
- Education: Holy Trinity CE Primary School; Greenfield Street School
- Occupation: Cartoonist
- Known for: Oink!; Round the Bend; Private Eye: "The Yobs"
- Spouse: Carole Garner (m. 1976)
- Children: 1
- Parents: Henry Ronald (father); Vera Husband (mother)
- Awards: Pont Award – Cartoon Art Trust Awards; 2005

William Anthony Husband (28 August 1950 – 18 October 2023) was a British cartoonist known for his black humour. He was mainly known for his work in Private Eye magazine, and his work has appeared in The Times, the Daily Mail and the Sunday Express as well as magazines including Playboy and The Spectator.

== Early life and education ==
Husband was born in Blackpool, Lancashire, on 28 August 1950. He was the son of Henry Ronald and Vera Husband. He attended Holy Trinity CE Primary School and Greenfield Street School in Hyde, Greater Manchester. He left school at 16 and worked in a jeweller's for 12 years, a job about which he said "It was full of characters and helped me to develop the black humour side."

== Career ==
Husband was a prolific cartoonist and sent a batch of unsolicited cartoons to Private Eye. He did not expect them to be published in one of the UK's foremost satirical magazines until a friend pointed out to him that two were in the latest edition. A number of his cartoons featured skinhead characters and in 1984, Private Eye editor Ian Hislop suggested a strip that became "The Yobs". The strip was published from 1985, and Husband was then able to leave his job and become a full-time cartoonist. He also had a Private Eye strip called "The Oldies" which ran for most of the 1990s. His cartoons appeared in every edition of Private Eye from 1984 until his death in 2023.

He co-founded and co-edited Oink! comic from 1986 to 1988. He co-wrote the Round the Bend children's television series, which ran from 1989 to 1991, and was also involved with children's TV show Hangar 17, which ran from 1992 to 1994. He has toured the UK with poet Ian McMillan with a poetry and cartoon show called "A Cartoon History of Here". In 2000 he won two awards at the Cartoonist of the Year awards, for best strip and best gag. In 2005, he won the Pont Award at the Cartoon Art Trust Awards for "depicting the British way of life".

== Personal life ==
Husband married Carole Garner in 1976. They had one son, the photographer Paul Husband (born 1978), with whom Husband wrote the book From a Dark Place.

== Death ==
Husband died on 18 October 2023 at age 73 after suffering a heart attack on Westminster Bridge, London. He had been on his way to a Private Eye party.
