= UT (comics) =

British adult comic

UT was a British adult comic that was published monthly in the mid-1990s.

The title began as a weekly pop music parody strip by Kev F Sutherland and Russ Carvell in the music paper Sounds, running from 1987 until Sounds final issue in 1991. When Sutherland got the chance to create a new humour magazine in September 1991 he revived the strip's name, with Carvell drawing the covers and lead movie parody strips.

Edited by Sutherland, UT was one of many comics emulating the success of Viz; however it attempted to engage the quality end of the market, with a variety of strips by talented and established cartoonists, TV satires, and supposedly intelligent (for the genre) subject matter.

However, in order to obtain financial backing, it required to be published by Sport Newspapers, who also publish the semi-pornographic tabloid Sunday Sport - as a result, UT featured a large number of pornographic adverts and Sport branding in some contrast to its content. A recurring theme throughout the comic was a fictionalised version of Sutherland battling with a stereotypical pornographer, a fat, balding lech constantly trying to add salacious content to the strips.

UT was published from late 1991 to early 1993, and included two reprint specials. Its sister titles Gag, Kack and Bloody Hell ran for only a few more months.

The name UT, chosen by Sutherland for the musical parody strip, came from the original first word of the tonic scale as taught to Victorian schoolchildren, i.e. "Ut-re-me-fa-so-la-te-do" which later became "Do-re-mi". UT Productions Ltd is the name of the company of which Sutherland is a director.

Strips included:

- Arthur Pilkington - a Conan the Barbarian lampoon involving accountants. Written and drawn by David Leach, the strip had first appeared in Gas magazine.
- Blunderbirds - a satire of ThunderBirds
- Fat Frank (of the Taxi Rank) - a taxi driver
- Rainbro - Rainbow with Zippy as a foul-mouthed bully.
- Special Agent Smegg - one of an interlocking set of strips involving the pupils in a public school in the 1960s through to modern times. Described as "a James Bond parody with knob gags."
- Thud and Bud - a pair of ineffectual nightclub bouncers
- Irwin Allen's TRAIN! - a spoof of disaster movies which incorporated satire on the state of Britain's railway network and poor excuses for late trains in its narrative.
