= The Biz (video game) =

1984 video game

- Developer: Virgin Games
- Publisher: Virgin Games
- Designer: Chris Sievey
- Platform: ZX Spectrum
- Release: EU: 1984
- Genre: Simulation
- Mode: Single-player

The Biz is a management simulation game published by Virgin Games for the ZX Spectrum in 1984. In The Biz, the player manages a rock band. The price of the game on release was £6.95, which is equivalent to £22.64 today. The tape cassette contained the program, an interview with Frank Sidebottom and Chris Sievey, and eight singles.

== Gameplay ==
In this screenshot, the player's father has won £40,000 while gambling on football. Unfortunately, the player only gets £10 as a way to keep the game balanced.

Players set up their rock band with gigs, make them rehearse new songs, and hire a recording studio for producing new albums. The player starts out with no talent or money and an agent must be hired in order to better co-ordinate the band. The stage presence of the band and the fanbase are improved with every gig performed. School dances and YMCAs are the first places that accept the player's newly formed band. Real television stations are included: a band from either Swansea or Cardiff would perform on S4C while a local band from Coventry would get promoted on Central Television. Players can sometimes record a session with John Peel, whose broadcasting influence opened up new bands to people between the ages of 20 and 60.

Mundane details such as insurance, standard musical instruments and transportation expenses are all tabulated against the player's savings in the game. The game also contains an anti-drug message for bands who consider experimenting with them.

== Reviews ==
The game only contains sound effects and no music, although eight singles were included on the cassette. There are no graphics to speak of and the game is text-based. A Crash review in March 1985 praised the game, stating that it was "[a]n unusually absorbing and addictive strategy/simulation with a sense of humour that represents good value."
