= Roger's Profanisaurus =

Humorous dictionary of profanity

- First edition
- Editor: "William H. Bollocks"
- Author: "Roger Mellie" (Chris Donald and Simon Donald in 1st edition; Graham Dury, Davy Jones and Simon Thorp thereafter)
- Language: English
- Genre: Humour
- Publisher: "Fulchester University Press"; Dennis Publishing
- Publication date: 1997 (comic booklet); 1998 (original book); 2002 (2nd Edition); 2005 (Profanisaurus Rex); 2007 (Magna Farta); 2010 (Das Krapital); 2013 (Hail Sweary); 2018 (War and Piss); 2024 (Turtleshead Revisited)
- Publication place: United Kingdom
- Media type: Print (Hardback, Paperback)
- ISBN: 978-1-907232-90-9

Roger's Profanisaurus is a humorous book (and for a short period commencing 2011; mobile app), published in the United Kingdom by Dennis Publishing which is written in the style of a lexicon of profane words and expressions. The book is marketed as "the foulest-mouthed book ever to stalk the face of the earth".

It is a spin-off publication from the popular British adult comic Viz, and features one of the comic's characters, the foul-mouthed Roger Mellie "the Man on the Telly who says 'Bollocks!'". The title of the book is a word play on Roget's Thesaurus, Profanisaurus being a portmanteau of profanity and Thesaurus.

== Publication history ==
The Profanisaurus was originally published as a supplement stapled into the middle of the December 1997 edition of the Viz comic (Viz 87), with 'over 700 rude words and phrases'. It was labelled "Sweary Mary's Dictionary", after a foul-mouthed character from Viz. The 2013 edition of the Profanisaurus is titled "Hail Sweary", a possible nod to her heritage.

Contributions from readers were originally published in the comic, and then edited into later editions.

The first actual book was released less than a year later, in 1998 (ISBN 1-902212-05-3), but the content had tripled with now 2,250 definitions; this was followed in the second edition in 2002 with the number of terms covered growing to 4,000 (ISBN 0-7522-1507-8).

An updated version, the Profanisaurus Rex, containing over 8,000 words and phrases, was released in 2005, and a further-expanded version, the "Magna Farta" (a play on Magna Carta) at the end of 2007. (Perhaps coincidentally, Oliver Cromwell is said to have referred to Magna Carta as "Magna Farta".)

Subsequent versions have been Das Krapital (2010, a play on Karl Marx's Das Kapital), Hail Sweary (2013, featuring on the cover Roger in a monk's outfit kneeling as if in prayer, and the title in Olde Englishe above; an obvious and obscene reference to the Catholic 'Hail Mary'), War and Piss (2018, a play on Tolstoy's War and Peace, with "over 20,000" definitions) and Turtleshead Revisited (2024, a play on Evelyn Waugh's Brideshead Revisited).

== Content ==
Unlike a traditional dictionary or thesaurus, the content is enlivened by often pungent or politically incorrect observations and asides, intended to provide further comic effect.

Those familiar with Ambrose Bierce's Devil's Dictionary might recognise some parallels with Bierce's style, though his lacked the overt obscenity.

The authors often take delight in lampooning political or media figures of the day, or illustrating terms with fictional dialogue between notionally respectable historical figures. A much-used technique for sexual phrases is to include them in a quoted passage from a non-existent Barbara Cartland novel.

== Reception ==
David Stubbs wrote that Profanisaurus "represents what you might call the maximalist tendency in obscenity".

Becky Barrow wrote that Profanisaurus "became a bestseller. It contained more swear words than the most devoted practitioner would ever remember."

== See also ==
- The Meaning of Liff
