= Fat Slags (film) =

- Theatrical release poster
- Directed by: Ed Bye
- Written by: William Osborne
- Based on: The Fat Slags by Graham Dury
- Produced by: Charles Finch; Luc Roeg
- Starring: Fiona Allen; Sophie Thompson; Jerry O'Connell; Anthony Head; Geri Halliwell; James Dreyfus; Naomi Campbell
- Cinematography: John Sorapure
- Edited by: Mark Wybourn
- Music by: David A. Hughes
- Production companies: Artists Independent Pictures; Funny Films
- Distributed by: Entertainment Film Distributors
- Release date: 15 October 2004
- Running time: 76 minutes
- Country: United Kingdom
- Language: English
- Box office: $105,091

Fat Slags is a 2004 British independent gross out comedy film based on the Viz comic characters of the same name. Despite the relative popularity of the comic strip (and its celebrity cameos), the film was panned by critics.

== Plot ==
Sandra Burke and Tracey Tunstall are two friends who are known as the infamously vulgar and crass Fat Slags. They live in the little town of Fulchester and like to drink booze, eat kebabs and bang people. One day, The slags were working in a steel-works factory and were about to be given a raise by their boss but instead they got fired due to Sandra leaving her fire torch burning and causing the whole factory to explode. Now unemployed, the slags rot in their dirty house until they notice a letter inviting them to be guests on a daytime chat show. The pair leave their hometown for London, aiming to sleep and drink their way to fame and fortune. Throughout their journey into the world of fame, they come across a shop that sells fashion clothes but they can't afford any of them due to them being too expensive.

On the day of their arrival in London, an American businessman named Sean Cooley, an internationally renowned billionaire and owner of Trans Global Media, is on a phone call to the Dalai Lama but a nearby flower pot drops on his head and he suffers a blow that renders him to go temporarily insane. While he is giving a slideshow talk in his conference room, a technical glitch switches the channel to the chat-show that Sandra and Tracey are on. Sean catches their look and falls for their larger-than-life antics. Sean gets his lawyer, Victor, to pick up the slags and take them to a hotel where they feel comfortable. Meanwhile, back in Fulchester, Sandra and Tracey's boyfriends, Baz and Dave see the girls on the chat show and hitch a ride to London. However, their driver doesn't pay attention to where he is going and causes a crash. Baz and Dave are then sent to immigration by the police. Two days before London Fashion Week, Sean forces fashion designer Fidor Ulrich Cosimo Konstantin to base his upcoming collection on the Fat Slags. The slags eventually get fit for the show, and they show off their studs ending up with them exposing their breasts to the audience and winning the contest.

A media sensation is brought about as Sandra and Tracey take the United Kingdom by storm, hitting #1 in the charts on Top of the Pops, having their own mansion and inadvertently winning the Turner Prize. As far as the press is concerned fatness becomes a hit. This new trend leads to Sean's assistant, Paige, gaining major weight.

The Slags maintain their vulgarity, which coupled with an endearing innocence connects with the British public. In private, however, jealousy drives a wedge between Sandra and Tracey as they vie for Sean's attention. Tracey punches Sandra, knocking her out and goes out on a date with Sean. She also accidentally bites Sean's willy off when his limo crashes, saving a bunch of nuns who were crossing the road. The slags then have a massive fight and accidentally kill off the General Secretary of the United Nations and end up locked away in the Tower of London. Sean calls up Tracey in his hospital bed and, as he is about to engage her to marry him, he gets hit in the head again (this time by a human scale). When Sean regains his mental faculties, he turns on the girls and their popularity comes to an end.

Sandra and Tracey escape the tower and payback on Sean for leaving them rotting in the Tower by pulling a Mission Impossible plan to steal his laptop that has illegal files on them. Victor chases after them but they eventually throw the laptop into his car window causing the car to explode. When they arrive home, they realise that their friendship is the only real thing they have in their world and they reunite with their boyfriends who have come back after being shipped to Afghanistan.

In the mid-credits scene, they perform a dance routine in a pub ending with them exposing their breasts.

== Cast ==
- Fiona Allen as Sandra "San" Burke
- Sophie Thompson as Tracey "Tray" Tunstall
- Jerry O'Connell as Sean Cooley
- Anthony Head as Victor Lange
- Geri Halliwell as Paige
- James Dreyfus as Fidor Ulrich Cosimo Konstantin
- Naomi Campbell as Sales Assistant
- Angus Deayton as Maurice, The Hotel Receptionist
- Hugh Dennis and Steve Punt as Immigration Officers
- Les Dennis as M.C.
- Simon Farnaby as A Ventriloquist
- Tom Goodman-Hill as Barry "Baz" Askwith
- Henry Miller as Dave
- Michael Greco as Niarchos
- Eamonn Holmes as Himself
- David Schneider as Tanner
- Metin and Timur Ahmet as Two Waiters
- Helen Lederer as A Hysterical Woman
- Ralf Little as A Milkman
- Ricky Gervais as The Bouncer
- John Thomson as The Foreman
- Dolph Lundgren as Randy
- Alison King as A Receptionist
- Shend as A Kebab Van Proprietor

== Production ==
In August 2003, it was announced a feature film adaptation of Fat Slags was slated to begin shooting scheduled 10 August. Fat Slags was part of a wave of sex comedies slated for production in the U.K. alongside other entries such as Sex Lives of the Potato Men, School for Seduction, and an attempted Carry On revival Carry On London, with the production of the latter soon cancelled.

== Reception ==
=== Critical response ===
Fat Slags was universally panned upon release. John Plunkett, writing for The Guardian, stated "It has plenty of gross-out stuff, but chucked in with an eerie lack of enjoyment or conviction. Depression seeps out of the screen like carbon monoxide." Adrian Hennigan for the BBC wrote "This painfully slapdash comedy – with caricatures instead of characters – lurches from one crude, staggeringly inept set-piece to another with the subtlety of a three-legged elephant." Graham Dury, the comic strip's creator, stated that Rita, Sue and Bob Too was a more accurate live action depiction of the comic book characters, telling the BBC that he was so appalled by the film, he threatened to stop drawing the strips. British film historian I.Q. Hunter listed Fat Slags as one of the contenders for worst British film ever made.
