= Fiona Allen =

English comedian and actress (born 1965)

- Born: 13 March 1965 (age 60); Bury, Lancashire, England
- Occupations: Actress, comedian
- Years active: 1988–present
- Spouse: Michael Parkinson
- Children: 3
- Relatives: Harry Allen (grandfather)

Fiona Allen (born 13 March 1965) is an English comedian and actress, most known for her work on Channel 4's Smack the Pony between 1999 and 2003.

== Career ==
Allen has appeared in many sketch shows, including We Know Where You Live (Channel 5), Smack the Pony (Channel 4), Goodness Gracious Me and The All Star Comedy Show. She has also appeared in many television dramas including Dalziel and Pascoe and Coronation Street, as well as the sitcom Happiness alongside Paul Whitehouse. Subsequently, she appeared as Sandra, in the film version of the Viz comic strip The Fat Slags, and as a panelist on one episode of Mock the Week. She played the comedian Carlotta Adams in the 2000 TV Poirot adaptation of 'Lord Edgware Dies'.

Allen appeared in the first episode of the second series of the E4 teenage drama Skins, playing Maxxie's mum Jackie Oliver. She also appeared in BBC drama Waterloo Road as Georgia Stevenson, playing the former lover of Tom Clarkson. From 2019 to 2020, she portrayed Michaela Turnbull in the BBC soap opera EastEnders.

Allen performed her debut stand up show, On The Run, at the Edinburgh Festival Fringe in 2023.

== Personal life ==
Allen's mother was born in Spain. Allen is married to the son of TV chat show host Michael Parkinson, also named Michael. Together they have three children.

In the late 1980s she worked as the box office manager at the Manchester nightclub the Haçienda, ran the Area (Factory Records' shop) at Affleck's Palace and makes a brief appearance playing herself in the film 24 Hour Party People.

In 2022, Allen returned to performing live comedy at The Stand-Up Club in Piccadilly, London.
