= Jesmond Park Academy =

School in Newcastle upon Tyne, England

Location
- Jesmond Park West; Newcastle upon Tyne, Tyne and Wear, NE7 7DP; England

Information
- Former names: Heaton Manor School; Manor Park School; Heaton School; Heaton Grammar School; Heaton High School
- Type: Academy Converter
- Motto: Create your future
- Established: 1928
- Local authority: Newcastle City Council
- Trust: Gosforth Federated Academies Trust
- Department for Education URN: 146752 Tables
- Ofsted: Reports
- Principal: Steve Campbell
- Gender: Mixed
- Age: 11 to 18
- Enrolment: 1,860
- Capacity: 1,904 As of January 2014
- Website: www.jesmondparkacademy.org.uk

Jesmond Park Academy is a coeducational secondary school and sixth form located in Heaton, Newcastle upon Tyne, England.

The school was formerly known as Heaton Manor School. It was renamed Jesmond Park Academy in 2019.

The school building, fully rebuilt in 2004 from PFI funding replaced two separate sites (known as the Jesmond and Benton sites) which in turn were made up of a number of different schools.

== History ==
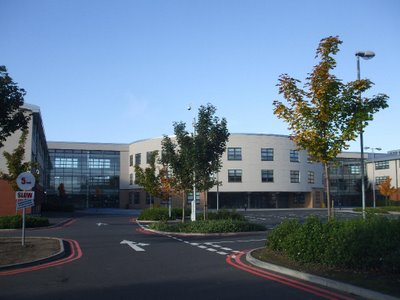
The 2004 school buildings

Before 2004, Years 7, 8, 9, 12 and 13 were housed on the "Jesmond Site" situated in buildings between Jesmond Park West and Newton Road. The main building was built in the 1920s, with a 1960s gym to the west and another addition to the north of the building, which was attached to it by a bridge walkway.

Years 10 and 11 were housed half a mile away on the "Benton Site", a purpose-built 1960s former secondary technical school on Benton Road, opposite the Benton Park View governmental office complex.

=== Heaton Grammar and Heaton High Schools ===
Government approval to build a secondary school in Heaton was given by the Board of Education in February 1924. The buildings on Newton Road were opened formally by Viscount Grey of Fallodon on 18 September 1928, although teaching had begun on 5 September. King George V and Queen Mary then paid a ceremonial visit to the school on 10 October, before opening the Tyne Bridge. The school building was symmetrical; everything found on one side of the school was mirrored on the opposite side. The western side of the building was Heaton Secondary School for Boys, with an entrance on Jesmond Park West, whilst the eastern side of the building was Heaton Secondary School for Girls, with a separate entrance on Newton Road. Another royal visit, by King George VI and Queen Elizabeth, took place on 7 April 1943. On 1 April 1945, the names of the schools were changed to Heaton Grammar School and Heaton High School respectively.

In 1958, Harry Askew became the second headmaster of the grammar school, which merged with the high school in September 1967 to become the comprehensive Heaton School. Askew remained head teacher until July 1979.

=== Manor Park Technical Grammar School ===
Following the Tripartite System of state-funded secondary education, Manor Park Technical Grammar School (or Manor Park Technical School) opened on Benton Road in 1960, replacing Middle Street Commercial School for Boys in Walker and Heaton Technical School. The new school, completely separate from Heaton Grammar and High Schools was initially on the Benton Road site only (1960–1966) then from 1967 expanded to encompass two sites itself. The lower site, which was on Addycombe Terrace, is now the Heaton Centre (for adult education) and Heaton Community Centre.

=== Heaton Manor School ===
Newcastle City Council's budget cuts meant that schools with low numbers had to be closed, leading to the merger of Heaton and Manor Park schools to form Heaton Manor School in 1983.

Originally, the sixth form (Years 12 and 13) were going to be housed on the former Manor Park site, but this was not possible due to the nature of the buildings.

The former Heaton Grammar site (located on Jesmond Park West) became known as the "Jesmond Site", whilst the former Manor Park site (located on Benton Road) became known as the "Benton Site". The rooms on the Jesmond site had a "J-" prefix (e.g. J44, JP1, JD1) to distinguish the same rooms over on the Benton site which had a "B-" prefix (e.g. B75, BP2, BD1)

Before 2001, the library was found on the upper south-west corridor and there were two halls (east and west). In 2001, the west hall became a new "Learning Resource Centre" and the former library suite was rebuilt and became a British Airways sponsored suite for those studying Travel and Tourism.

Back in 1998, a number of students were featured along with John Dryden and Ann Smedley (Headteacher and Deputy Headteacher respectively) on the front page of the Evening Chronicle with the headline "Thanks a Mi££ion!" after Heaton Manor had secured money for a complete refurbishment.

=== Building of the new school ===
Building work commenced in 2002 with the new school being built "upon" the old one – which required the East half of the school to be demolished in the summer of 2003 and work to commence on the footprint of the old east side and the front and back fields. This meant that from September 2003 until the summer of 2004, the school was truly half old, half new. Three new buildings were open for use and the west side of the old building was still being used.

After July 2004, the Benton Road site was closed and soon after was demolished, to make way for the housing development named after it, as "Manor Park". The remaining old buildings on the Jesmond site were then fully demolished and the remainder of the new buildings were built.

The new school was ready for service in September 2004.

=== Jesmond Park Academy ===
A 2018 Ofsted inspection judged Heaton Manor School 'Inadequate,' the lowest of four rating classifications. Due to the inadequate judgement, it was announced that the school would become an academy, starting on the 2019–2020 academic year under the Gosforth Federated Academies Trust. The new academy caused controversy in the local community as it discarded the area that it was located, Heaton, with the new name, Jesmond Park Academy.

However, a 2022 Ofsted report for Jesmond Park Academy indicated performance had improved to 'good,' which is the second highest ranking classification, representing a significant improvement in the school's quality.

In October 2023, the school closed for several weeks after its building was damaged on 18 October by Storm Babet, leaving a danger from metal panels falling onto pupils and staff. The length of the closure was due to a complicated legal dispute over who was responsible for the repairs: PFI contractor Equans, a UK maintenance company owned Bouygues, or someone else.

== Academic performance ==
In 2018, the school's Progress 8 score at GCSE was below average, but the Attainment 8 score was above average.

== Activities ==
There is an extensive "period seven" programme which offers extra-curricular activities. There are many sports teams as well as "booster" lessons in most subjects. Heaton Manor is also a member of Amnesty International. The school participates in many sporting competitions.

=== Debating ===
One of the period seven activities that was offered was the Heaton Manor Union Society, which was the school's Debating Society for students in Key Stages Three and Four. The Society was founded in 2006 by the Department of Citizenship. Its weekly meetings involved a debate on a pre-released topic, featuring two pairs arguing for or against the motion respectively. A vote is held, and a team of judges also selected a winner. On 10 May 2008, two of the Society's members participated in the national finals of the International Competition for Young Debaters, in Oxford. This was widely regarded as a great achievement, as very few comprehensive schools qualified.

Heaton Manor also maintained a Post 16 debating team, "The Head Strong Club". They participated multiple times in the National Institute of Ideas Debating Matters competition, progressing to the National Finals in 2005 having won the North East regional heats, as well as competing in the prestigious English-Speaking Union Schools Mace.

== Notable former pupils ==
- Sammy Ameobi, Professional Footballer for Newcastle United
- Tomi Ameobi, Professional Footballer for FC Edmonton
- Shola Ameobi, Professional Footballer for Newcastle United and Nigeria
- Elsie Tu, Social activist and elected member of the Urban Council of Hong Kong

=== Manor Park Technical Grammar School ===
- Geoff Allen (footballer)
- Derek Forster, professional footballer with Sunderland in the 1960s/1970s
- Jimmy Husband, professional footballer with Everton in the 1960s/1970s
- Stephen Laws, writer
- Jimmy Nail, actor and singer
- Dennis Tueart, professional footballer with Manchester City in the 1960s/1970s
- David Young (footballer, born 1945)

=== Manor Park School ===
- John Davison (boxer)

=== Heaton Grammar School ===
- Neil Bartlett, professor of chemistry at the University of California, Berkeley from 1969 to 1993, notable for his work on noble gas compounds
- Prof Jeffrey Braithwaite Health Systems Researcher, University of New South Wales
- Bruce Macintosh Cattanach, geneticist
- Michael Chaplin, writer and television producer.
- Prof John Frank Davidson, Shell Professor of Chemical Engineering at the University of Cambridge from 1978 to 1993, President of the IChemE from 1970 to 1971
- Prof David Delpy, Chief Executive from 2007 of the Engineering and Physical Sciences Research Council
- Edward Henderson, Archdeacon of Pontefract from 1968 to 1981
- Alan Lillington, 100m runner at the 1952 Summer Olympics
- Paul Smith, cricketer for Warwickshire.
- Derek Talbot, badminton player and Commonwealth Games gold medallist.
- Peter Terson, playwright.
- Esmond Wright, historian and Conservative MP

=== Heaton High School ===
- Air Cdre Joy Tamblin CB, Director from 1976 to 1980 of the Women's Royal Air Force

=== Heaton Secondary School ===
- Hilary Boulding, President of Trinity College, Oxford and former Principal of the Royal Welsh College of Music and Drama
- Chris Donald, Founder of Viz
- Simon Donald co-creator of Viz Magazine
- Andrew Parker, Baron Parker of Minsmere, Director General of MI5, 2013–20.
- Paul Smith (cricketer, born 1964)
- Charlie Hunnam, actor
