= Zit =

Zit or Zits may refer to:

- a pimple, slang term made popular by Jeff Tokarz in the 1970s
- Zit (comic), an adult British comic
- Zits (comics), a syndicated daily comic strip by Jerry Scott
- Zhuzhou Institute of Technology, former name of the Hunan University of Technology
