= Terry Fuckwitt =

Character in the British adult comic Viz

Terrence St John "Terry" Fuckwitt is a recurring character in the British comic Viz, in a strip subtitled "the unintelligent cartoon character".

== Personality and appearance ==
Fuckwitt's regrettable flaw is that he continuously mistakes situations, objects and people for things they are not. He is cross-eyed and has wirey black hair in a style resembling dreadlocks, and wears outdated 70s platform shoes. Due to the swearword in his name, the comic never prints it in its entirety on the front page, often obscuring it with another graphic element, or else spoonerising it to "Wuckfitt". He lives with his parents, both of whom despair at his stupidity, and often make unsuccessful attempts to get rid of him. In one strip he responds to an employment advert that states, "Cunt Wanted". Upon realising that he has done something stupid, Terrence usually exclaims, correctly, that he has "shit for brains".

== Typical story ==
The first frame of a Terry Fuckwitt strip will often have him cheerfully greeting the readers, (Note: Fuckwitt's communication with the reader is a parody of the style of historic British children's comics, such as The Beano or The Dandy, which are often meta-referential, with characters not only aware that they are being read in a comic strip, but "breaking the fourth wall" and addressing those readers directly as the strip begins.) saying he is doing some activity, only for the second frame to reveal that he is in totally the wrong place. For example, in one strip he appears to be getting married, but it is revealed that he is not in a church, but in a nuclear power plant, and that his bride is a rod of uranium.

Fuckwitt's surreal misunderstandings are sometimes extended in multiple directions, or even circularly. Fuckwitt may be chastised by another character for being in the wrong place, and that character may later themselves be revealed to be someone completely different based on a misunderstanding of the first character, making it apparent that in fact Fuckwitt's initial impression was correct. These "facts" then may be completely reversed in a surprise reveal in the next frame, and so forth.

Fuckwitt sometimes interacts with other Viz characters, such as when he was informed that he was not in fact Terry Fuckwitt at all, but rather Billy the Fish in disguise. The remainder of the strip became a Billy the Fish story. In one early strip, Fuckwitt forgets to turn up for his own comic strip, appearing in the last frame asking if he was too late. The rest of the cartoon followed a "Meanwhile, next door ..." scenario, following The Bacon family.

The strip also features extremely bizarre occurrences. One cartoon played on the use of perspective in art, with Terry forgetting to grow larger as he moved from the background into the foreground. One other cartoon had Terry's father telling Terry to get out of his sight, warning his son that should he see him again that day, he would kick his face in. Although Terry attempts to keep out of sight, Terry's father sees him on TV and subsequently kicks him in the face through the television. How this was achieved and how the two characters were able to talk to one another is not explained.

== Bibliography ==
- Donald, C. (2004) Rude Kids: The Unfeasible Story of Viz HarperCollins. ISBN 0-0071-9096-4
