= Psycho Sid =

Psycho Sid may refer to:

- Sid Eudy (1960–2024), an American professional wrestler
- Psycho Sid, a character in the British comic Smut
