= Fuckwit =

Fuckwit is vulgar slang for a very stupid person. It may also refer to:

- Terry Fuckwitt, a character in the British adult comic Viz
- Fuckwit, a short film by Daniel Krige
- Fuckwit, a character in comic book miniseries Wanted
