= Viz: The Game =

1991 video game

Viz: The Computer Game
- Publisher: Virgin Interactive
- Platforms: Commodore 64, ZX Spectrum, Amiga, Amstrad CPC, Atari ST, IBM PC
- Release: 1991
- Genre: Racing
- Mode: Single-player

Viz: The Computer Game (also known in-game as "Viz: The Soft Floppy One" and "Viz: The Game" on the box cover) is a single player racing game based on the Viz adult comic which was released in 1991 by Virgin Interactive. The game's music was composed by Jeroen Tel.

== Gameplay ==
Characters Johnny Fartpants, Biffa Bacon, and Buster Gonad compete in a series of five races around the fictional town of Fulchester for some unnamed prize. The races are run in the park, Fulchester High Street, a building site, the beach and a nightclub. The race commentator is Roger Mellie, who provides irreverent chat throughout the game, and many of Viz's popular characters pop up to help or hinder the contestants.

Before the race, each character has the chance to earn tokens by playing a minigame which then can be used during gameplay to give him a temporary advantage. Biffa is able to punch his way through some obstacles or gets into a fight with himself boosting his speed. Johnny can use his "pump power" to jump over small obstacles or to take off and fly a short distance. Buster can use his "unfeasibly large testicles" to jump over small obstacles or put them in a wheelbarrow and gain a burst of speed.

Each contestant must stick to his race lane; otherwise, the referee from Billy the Fish will hurl bricks at the errant racer temporarily stunning him. The courses are set so that each character cannot help running in and out of each other's lanes. If the character is hit, he loses a life. If he loses three lives, it's race over for the human player - the AI characters have unlimited lives.

== Reception ==
Although the game received mediocre reviews in the gaming press, with the Commodore 64 version coming under particularly heavy criticism for what was perceived to be excessive loading times, the game did sell very well, particularly for its adult humour which was seldom seen in video games in 1991. The Spectrum version of the game went to number 2 in the UK sales charts, behind Teenage Mutant Ninja Turtles.

The One gave the Amiga version of Viz: The Computer Game an overall score of 68%, expressing that it "isn't such good value for money ... £19.99 buys you a standard obstable course, a few bonus screens and a handful of jokes." The One furthermore expresses that the bonus games are "good fun" and "accurately capture the characteristics of the comic, but underneath the glossy exterior there lurks nothing more elaborate than a basic chase game ... there just isn't enough substance to justify the price." The One also criticises the absence of other characters from Viz such as Billy the Fish. The One concludes that "As a game all this is most likely to appeal to exactly the sort of people who aren't allowed to buy it - kids. Adults should consider sticking their nose in a Viz book instead."
