= Acne (comic) =

British children's comic

- Cover of the first issue, illustrated with Billy Butt punching Bart Simpson in the face

Publication information
- Publisher: Acne Publishing Co.
- Schedule: Fortnightly
- Format: Comics anthology
- Genre: Humor/comedy
- Publication date: August 1991 – September 1993
- No. of issues: 31
- Main character: Billy Butt
- Editors: Tom Fulep; Clive Ward; Dean Wilkinson

Acne was a British fortnightly children's comic.

== Publication history ==
Acne was launched in August 1991, styling itself as "Britain's first alternative kids' comic!", it was initially produced by the editors responsible for the adult comic Smut. The comic's lead character was Billy Butt, a delinquent skinhead. Acne contained parodies of popular culture and street safety, alongside more serious anti-drug content with its younger readership in mind. Although it was aimed at children, the comic contained violent themes and the liberal use of swear words. To avoid retailers putting the publication in the adult section front covers explicitly stated that it was for children.

== Contributors ==
The major contributor to Acne was the cartoonist Lee Healey, who would go on to produce the Drunken Bakers strip in Viz. Towards the end of the comic's run, he was producing the majority of its content, including the hapless superhero Blind-Man and Adventures in the Land of the Crap Drawings. Other contributors to Acne included Charlie Brooker, Davy Francis, Tony Husband, Will Kevans, and Lew Stringer.

== Reception ==
Acne has been compared to earlier children's comic Oink! and is considered one of many publications imitating the adult comic Viz. While the artistic quality of some of the regular strips in Acne have been praised, other content in the publication has been critiqued for its classism.
