= Buster Gonad =

Publication information
- Publisher: Viz
- First appearance: 1986
- Created by: Graham Dury

Buster Gonad is a cartoon character in the British comic Viz. The strip involves the surreal adventures of "the boy with unfeasibly large testicles". During a storm, Buster's gonads were zapped by cosmic rays which enlarged them to an enormous size, so that he needs a wheelbarrow to carry them around. As a result, they are impossible to conceal and are therefore out on open display for everyone to see and marvel at.

== Background ==
The plot-lines vary, but are always bizarre, revolving around Buster's outstanding physical attributes being a blessing or a curse. For example, in one episode Buster climbs a tree whereupon some children standing below mistake his hairy scrotum for giant horse chestnuts, deciding to pelt it with sticks and stones in order to knock it down so they can play conkers. Moments later, a passing farmer attempts to help the children by blasting the "horse chestnuts" with his double-barrelled shotgun. Finally, an endangered species of bird decides to build a nest on Buster's scrotum and lays eggs in it. It is illegal to disturb the rare bird's nest, so poor Buster is forced to stay up the tree for the next few weeks until the eggs hatch and the fledglings have left the nest.

In December 1987, Viz released a 7-inch single entitled "Bags of Fun With Buster" (B-side "Scrotal Scratch Mix") by Johnny Japes and His Jesticles (in reality Andy Partridge and Dave Gregory of XTC; journalist, record producer and sometime vocalist Neville Farmer; and John Otway on vocals released on Fulchester Records). Buster also featured in the 1991 Viz computer game.

During the Gulf War of 1991, a SEPECAT Jaguar GR1A (number XZ118 Y) bomber of the Royal Air Force featured Buster Gonad nose art. Vintage framed copies of Buster Gonad cartoons from the 1980s are now collectable items.

== References in other media ==
The Daily Telegraph called him one of Viz's "classic inventions". The BBC says he's a "star" and a "household name". Buster is mentioned in the British Medical Journal.
