= Cockney Wanker =

Comics character created by Graham Dury and Simon Thorp

Publication information
- Publisher: Viz
- Created by: Graham Dury and Simon Thorp

Cockney Wanker is a character created by Graham Dury and Simon Thorp in Viz based on a stereotyped male Cockney. Wanker speaks in rhyming slang (often slang invented by the writers) and spends his days drinking and selling stolen or unworkable goods to passers-by from an East End market stall. Another of Wanker's specialities is trading used cars. Playing upon the stereotype of the indigenous population of London being fantasists, Wanker often buys a car, sells it back to the same person for the same amount of money, then declares the transaction to have been "A nice little earner!" He wears cheap gold jewellery or Argos bling and 'Laahndan' gangster dark glasses, and is often seen smoking a cigar.

He is a wife-beater and lifelong racist who complains about "Sooties", yet respects Frank Bruno. He is established as a royalist, especially supportive of the Queen Mother, spouting received wisdom such as "Ninety Free she is. Ninety Free. Wahn the bladdy war for us she did!"

Wanker's appearance is based on a combination of a stereotypical London taxi driver and Mike Reid's character Frank Butcher from EastEnders. His characterisation also draws elements from David Jason's "Del Trotter" in Only Fools and Horses. Other characters in the strip closely resemble EastEnders characters, e.g. Shirl, his long suffering and battered wife (Kathy Beale) and Lou, Shirl's fearsome old-school East End mother (Lou Beale).

== See also ==
- Wanker

== Bibliography ==
- Donald, Chris. Rude Kids: The Unfeasible Story of Viz. HarperCollins, 2004. ISBN 0-0071-9096-4
- Trilling, Daniel. Bloody Nasty People: The Rise of Britain's Far Right. Verso Books, 2012. ISBN 1-8446-7959-4
