= Annie Kevans =

English artist (born 1972)

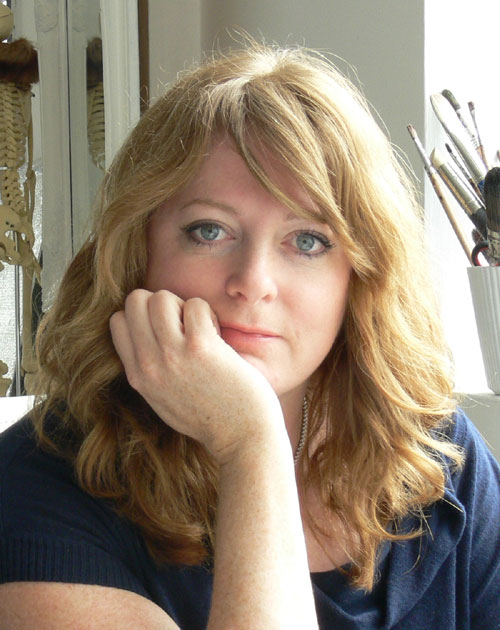
- Born: 1972 (age 53–54); Cannes, France
- Education: Central Saint Martins College of Art and Design; City University
- Occupation: Artist
- Spouse: Will Kevans
- Children: 1

Annie Kevans (born Cannes, France, 1972) is an English artist who paints series of 'portraits' that explore sometimes controversial concepts and alternative histories. They are "portraits only in a loose sense... her works being a composite of existing images, research and imagination". Kevans has been described as "sensitive yet fearless, an artist who tackles controversial subjects head on". She was named number 19 in Harper's Bazaar magazine's "Forty Under 40" chart of hot new British talent and was named number 32 in New Woman magazine's "Brit Hit List" and was described as the "new Tracey Emin".

She is married to Will Kevans, with whom she has one daughter.

== Early life ==
Kevans was born in 1972 in Cannes, France, to British parents. She was educated in France and England and subsequently took her part-time BA degree at Central Saint Martins College of Art and Design (1999–2004). While studying there, she supported herself by working at the V&A Museum of Childhood in London's East End. During this time, she also studied part-time for an MA in Museum & Gallery Management at City University in London.

In an interview for Running in Heels, Polly Allen says: "Growing up in a family of fearless and high-achieving women, [Kevans] describes herself as “a natural feminist. It wasn’t even a question for me.” She could take her pick from role models, such as her two great-aunts (Eleanor, one of the first female bosses in the UK who worked in the male-dominated gas industry, and Trubody, who was a spy and a member of MI6 with a Bronze Star Medal for bravery)."

== Work ==
=== Boys ===
The 30 paintings from the series Boys, from Kevans' BA Degree show at Central Saint Martins, were bought in their entirety by Charles Saatchi in 2004. These paintings showed 20th-century tyrants, dictators and war criminals such as Adolf Hitler, Pol Pot and Radovan Karadžić as young children. Kevans has repeatedly expressed her gratitude to Saatchi "because he kept the series together... people had been trying to buy bits and pieces of it – they all wanted Hitler". Kevans revealed that "having spent months looking for snapshots of infant autocrats at play, she eventually gave up. "I thought, 'Does it matter anyway if I make them up?' It caused quite a lot of debate". The series received positive reviews when it was shown at the Saatchi Gallery in London in 2013 and was described as "the highlight of a new exhibition called, simply, Paper" by Canadian newspaper The Globe and Mail. The works were described as "provocative and haunting" and "fresh".

=== Gods and Aliens ===
Gods and Aliens (2004) looked at the human need to believe and featured portraits of leading religious figures as well as leaders in the field of ufology.

=== Girls ===
Kevans' third series, Girls, dealing with the sexualisation of childhood and exhibited at London's Studio1.1 gallery in 2006, was an installation of a girl's bedroom complete with bed, a lampshade, teddy bears and other childhood toys and memorabilia. The Sunday Times said: "the portraits are all somewhat suggestive: [Britney] Spears is depicted in her bra, while [Brooke] Shields is shown at 12, when she became famous as a hooker in the film Pretty Baby". Elle magazine described the series as unsettling: "Don’t be fooled by her wide-eyed adolescents: dark themes hide behind those soft brush strokes... the unsettling contrast of purity and corruption has proved a big hit".

Two of the works from Girls were selected for the Jerwood Drawing Prize in 2006 and toured the UK as part of the exhibition.

=== Swans and Mouseketeers ===
Kevans' next solo exhibition, entitled Swans, shown in June 2007 at 319 Portobello Road, focused on the "American Dream" and included an image of Jessica Dubroff, a seven-year-old pilot who was attempting to become the youngest person to fly an airplane across the United States. Dubroff was killed 24 hours into the flight when her plane crashed. She was "Inspired by an American makeover programme called The Swan where women of low self-esteem are transformed by plastic surgery. For me it exemplifies society's obsession with youth and beauty." The exhibition included paintings of Mouseketeers Doreen Tracey and Britney Spears. All 27 paintings in the Swans exhibition sold out as soon as it opened and Kevans was therefore able to give up her day job as a secretary to focus on her art full-time.

=== China ===
Kevans' China series (2005) looked at China's "One Child" policy, which forces many families to have only one child in order to keep China's population growth under control. In an interview with Time Out, London, Kevans said "[Chinese Lolita] is not an actual person. She's part of a new series of paintings of Chinese children with Western ideals projected onto them. I was interested in the contradiction of China's one child policy, which focuses all the attention on a single child, in a society that's based on communal ideals."

=== Vamps and Innocents ===
In September 2007, Kevans exhibited a new series of paintings she had been working on, called Vamps and Innocents, for a solo show in Vienna, based on the silent films of the 1920s and its stars. She said, "the portraits are of the '20s female movie stars who were forced to either play the role of the virgin or the whore."

=== WAMPAS Baby Stars ===
Continuing on with her interest in reinvention and manipulation, Kevans painted the WAMPAS Baby Stars series in 2009, portraying starlets selected for stardom by the Western Association of Motion Picture Advertisers, between 1922 and 1934. The WAMPAS Constitution affirmed that each WAMPAS member should feel an "ever-present consciousness of his responsibility to the profession he publicizes, the industry he represents and to the public whose tendencies, thoughts and impulses he is such a factor in forming and directing". With this in mind, the girls were given new identities then presented to the world at the annual "WAMPAS Frolic", where their all American beauty could be celebrated and idealised. Although Joan Crawford, Mary Astor, and Fay Wray became Hollywood hits, most Baby Stars were not destined for stardom. Of the 143 girls, most were unable to pursue careers in the "talkies" and rapidly disappeared from public consciousness. Today, their images remain lost in Hollywood archives.

=== Ship of Fools ===
Kevans's solo exhibition at the Fine Art Society in 2009 featured successful men and women who have been dogged by depression, eating disorders, addiction and other forms of mental illnesses. Michael Jackson, Winston Churchill, Mark Twain, Drew Barrymore and Diana, Princess of Wales all feature, alongside the tortured artists Van Gogh, Jackson Pollock and Georgia O'Keeffe. "I've always been interested in madness – there's a lot of it in my family," says Kevans, who was inspired by medieval images of European towns shipping their deranged inhabitants out to sea. The private view was held on board the Golden Hinde and was the first-ever exhibition to be staged on the reconstructed Tudor warship. "It's quite small, dark and miserable inside, which really brings the theme home," says Kevans.

=== All the Presidents' Girls ===
In March 2009, Kevans had her first USA solo exhibition All the Presidents Girls at Volta NY in New York. The series featured presidential mistresses and Kevans highlighted the manipulation of truth in the recording of history as well as in the creation of status and authority in ordinary men. The International Art Newspaper reviewed the exhibition of "beautifully executed paintings" depicting all the mistresses of US presidents including Monica Lewinsky and Marilyn Monroe, and commented the show was "pulling in the crowds". All 11 pieces relating to JFK sold before the fair opened, with around 12 other works purchased within an hour of the event launch. One US couple commented "as Americans, we find it mildly offensive".

Kevans' first large-scale US solo exhibition, Manumission, took place in February 2010 at Perry Rubenstein Gallery in New York. Continuing with the series All the Presidents' Girls, Kevans painted the illegitimate slave children of presidents such as Thomas Jefferson and John Tyler, alluding to the injustice and hypocrisy perpetrated by some of the most revered figures in American history. The works looked at issues surrounding racial conflict in the US and the ongoing denial of the horrors of slavery, at a time when the US elected its first black president. The word "manumission" means the freeing of a slave.

=== Collaborators ===
In 2010, Kevans began a series of works entitled Collaborators which looked at Nazi collaborators. The works look at how personal histories are rewritten and forgotten. Kevans painted Coco Chanel who was a well-known nazi collaborator during World War II. After the war, Chanel was forced to flee France and live in exile for ten years and this was well-documented at the time. When Kevans' work was exhibited in Paris in 2010, Kevans was accused of "making it up" by several French people who were completely unaware of Chanel's real past, as this has been gradually removed from Chanel's story.

=== All About Eve ===
After a break for maternity leave, Kevans created the series All About Eve, which looked at family histories. Kevans portrayed women who seem to repeat the behaviour of their mothers and ancestors including Lady Diana Spencer, Camilla Parker Bowles and Sarah Ferguson, who all have ancestors who were lovers and wives of kings. The series also featured the actress Romy Schneider, who had an affair with John F. Kennedy, and her mother, Magda Schneider, also an actress, who had an affair with Adolf Hitler. The series was shown in Antwerp in 2014 at Fifty One Too. The exhibition received positive press reviews in leading Belgian newspapers.

=== The Muses of Jean Paul Gaultier ===
In 2013, Kevans was approached by Thierry-Maxime Loriot, the curator of The Fashion World of Jean Paul Gaultier - From the Sidewalk to the Catwalk, to depict Jean Paul Gaultier's muses for his touring exhibition. Jean Paul Gaultier said: "I am impressed by the way Annie Kevans captured the different types of beauties that have been my inspiration and my muses from my grandmother to artists like David Bowie and Boy George." On Kevans' new series, Loriot said: "Annie Kevans' work caught my attention years ago when I saw her fantastic oil paintings 'All The Presidents Girls' at Volta in New York. As she is a great storyteller who works in series, I thought she was the best artist to create these eye-catching and delicate portraits that tell Gaultier's story about his muses and inspirations, all great characters, these paintings translate well the humanist message in his work. I am delighted Kevans is now taking part in the exhibition tour." The work was shown at the National Gallery of Victoria in Melbourne and then in Paris at Le Grand Palais in April 2015. The muses are Tanel Bedrossiantz, Christine Bergstrom, David Bowie, Boy George, Naomi Campbell, Lily Cole, Tim Curry, Agyness Deyn, Beth Ditto, Jourdan Dunn, Karen Elson, Aitize Hanson, Farida Khelfa, Fredérique Lorca, Madonna, Françis Menuge, Kate Moss, Kristen McMenamy, Kylie Minogue, Erin O'Connor, Rossy de Palma, Jade Parfitt, Gaultier’s Grandmother Marie, Micheline Presle, Stella Tennant, Andrej Pejic, Anna Pawlowski, Stéphane Sednaoui, Dita von Teese and Amy Winehouse.

=== Women and the History of Art & Drag ===
Kevans' most recent series, Women and the History of Art, depicts "successful but frequently forgotten or overlooked female artists, salvaged from the archives of patriarchal art history". The series was shown at the Fine Art Society in London from 13 May to 6 June 2014 and at Jenkins Johnson Gallery in San Francisco later that year. One writer described the series as "both a “thank you” to the women who have been inspirational to Kevans’ own career and a pithy “fuck you” to the historians and curators who continue to downplay their role in art history... when viewed as a collection, the numerous paintings combine to broadcast a powerful message that betrays their illusory simplicity ... Who knew pretty little portraits could be so empowering?".

In 2016, Kevans exhibited at Danziger Gallery in New York and showed a new group of works collectively called Drag. They were exhibited alongside "The History of Art" and portrayed male art stars such as Francis Bacon, Marcel Duchamp, Andy Warhol, Henri de Toulouse-Lautrec and Robert Mapplethorpe. The men all photographed themselves in drag, comfortably posing as women, confident that their achievements would not be forgotten. The question remains, would these artists continue to be so revered had they been born women?

=== Commissions and collaborations ===
Fellow artists Marc Quinn and Stella Vine are noted as being fans of her paintings. Quinn has Kevans' work in his art collection.

Following a commission for a family in Dubai, which included a painting of Sheikh Mohammad bin Zayed Al Nahyan and Sheikh Mohammed bin Rashid Al Maktoum, one of Kevans' paintings appeared on Have I Got News For You in late April 2007.

In November 2008, Kevans contributed a painting, originally used as the sleeve art for her musician husband Will Kevans' record Dialling Tone in 2007, to an exhibition Awopbopaloobop in London, where artists had made works inspired by a favourite song lyric. The painting had been banned in November 2007 by online music store iTunes who operate a "strict 'no nipples' rule" forcing the artist to crop the image in order for iTunes to stock the song. Kevans said: "The picture's now cropped, so you just see the face. I didn't worry about it, because painting isn’t usually thought of as pornographic."

In January 2009, Kevans was a judge for the Daler Rowney international art competition Make Your Mark. The winner of the Further Education category won a two night stay in London and the opportunity to spend a day with Annie Kevans.

In 2011, one of Kevans' paintings was chosen for the book cover of Elvira Lindo's new book entitled Don de Gentes. Elvira Lindo is a Spanish writer who writes for El País. Also in 2011, another of Kevans' paintings, "Mary Miles Minter", appeared in a book by fashion designer, Peter Jensen. The book looks at the role of the muse.

== Solo exhibitions ==
- Annie Kevans, Fine Art Society, London, (3 - 25 October 2017)
- Annie Kevans, Danziger Gallery, New York, (4 November - 13 January 2016)
- Annie Kevans: Selected Portraits, Fine Art Society, Edinburgh (14 July - 3 September 2016)
- Women and the History of Art, Jenkins Johnson Gallery, San Francisco (2014)
- Women and the History of Art, Fine Art Society, London, UK (13 May - 6 June 2014)
- All About Eve, Fifty One Too, Antwerp, Belgium (January - March 2014)
- Manumission, Perry Rubenstein Gallery, New York, USA (12 February - 16 March 2010)
- Ship of Fools, Fine Art Society, London, UK (26 November - 23 December 2009)
- All the Presidents' Girls, "All The President's Girls" Volta, New York, USA (5–8 March 2009)
- Vamps and Innocents, Galleria Antonio Ferrara, Vienna, Austria (September 2007)
- Swans, 319 Portobello Road, London, UK (1–23 June 2007)
- Girls, Studio 1.1, 57a Redchurch Street, London, UK (7 April - 7 May 2006)

== Collections ==
- Saatchi Gallery, UK
- Pallant House Gallery, UK
- Montreal Museum of Fine Arts, Canada
- Jean Pigozzi, US
- 21c Museum Hotels, US
- Stephen Fry
- Marc Quinn, UK
- Roberts Institute of Art
- John McEnroe
