= Student Grant =

Publication information
- Publisher: Viz
- First appearance: 1992
- Created by: Simon Thorp

In-story information
- Notable aliases: Grant Wankshaft

Student Grant is a cartoon strip created by Simon Thorp for the British comic Viz. Grant first appeared in 1992 and became popular, featuring regularly for the rest of the decade. The character is a university student named Grant Wankshaft, attending the fictional Spunkbridge University, one of the former polytechnics which became universities in 1992. Grant is pretentious, lazy, smug and conceited, and peppers his speech with the word "actually". He does little or no work for his degree.

Grant vainly thinks of himself as a world-wise liberal intellectual, but is frequently shown as bigoted, not especially bright, and reliant on his parents for support, with little idea about the world outside of campus. He spends money freely but begrudges paying full price for anything because, as he constantly notes "students are really feeling the pinch". He has a number of friends just like him, eager to express their individuality by wearing the same clothes, following invariably ridiculous fashions such as huge hats, bright yellow dungarees and T-shirts with slogans on them like Thunderbirds Are Go! and, in the late 1990s especially, Teletubbies Say 'Eh Oh'!. They are opinionated and talk loudly and ignorantly about various subjects, "proving" their intelligence by listing the grades they got in their A-levels. Several of Grant's collegiate friends have bizarre speech impediments, dental deformities or both. All the female students have the same forename (Hilary) and dress identically.

Grant boasts that he is in the "top 15-to-35 percent of the population", and likes to think of himself as in touch with the working classes but is utterly middle class and possesses a latent contempt for non-students in general, regarding himself and his friends as their superiors. This has resulted in a number of savage beatings over the years.

== Bibliography ==
- Donald, Chris. "Rude Kids: The Unfeasible Story of Viz". HarperCollins, 2004. ISBN 0-0071-9096-4
