= Sid the Sexist =

Publication information
- Publisher: Viz
- First appearance: Issue 9 in October 1982
- Created by: Simon Donald

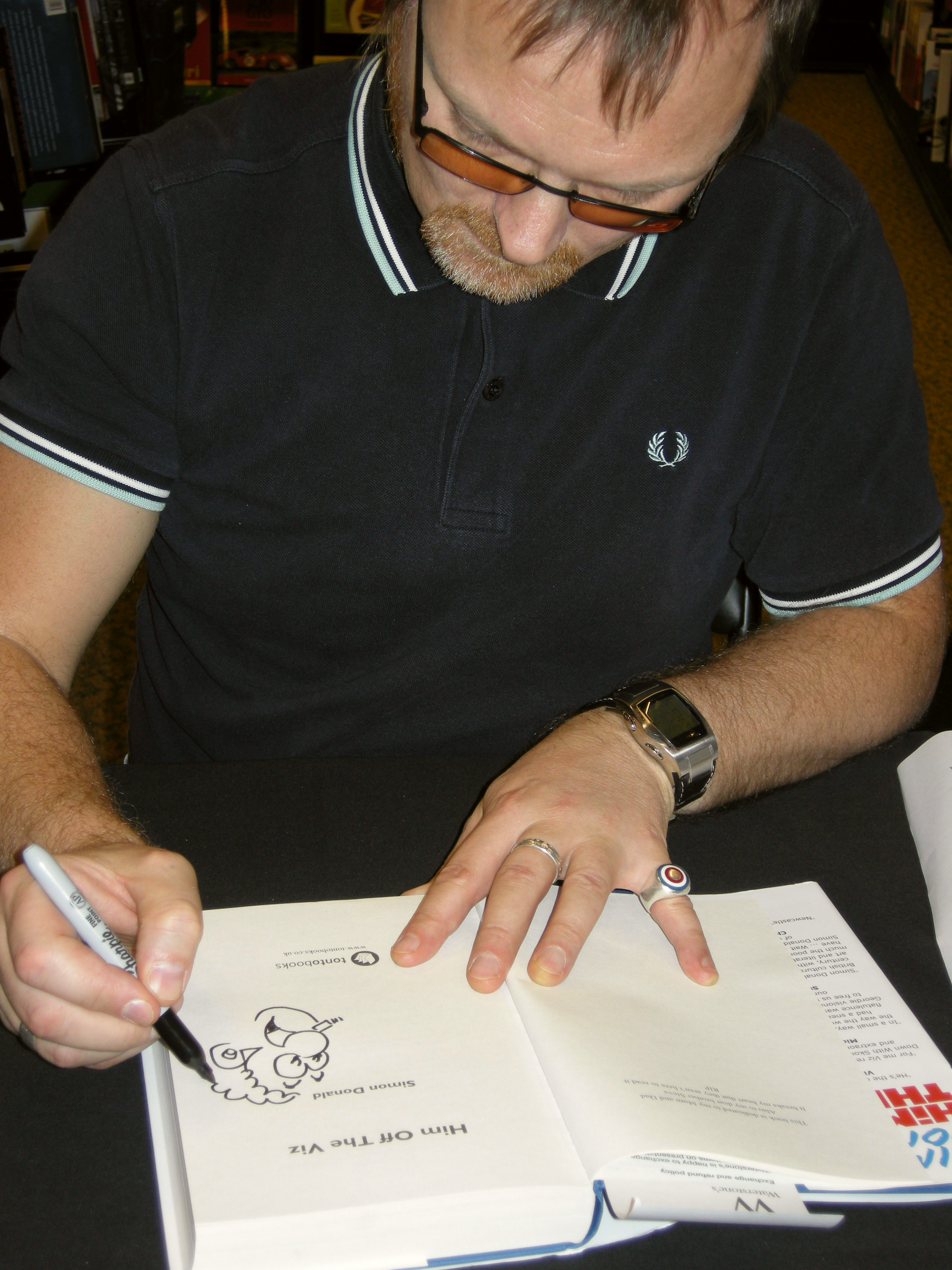
Simon Donald drawing Sid the Sexist in a copy of his book, Him off the Viz, in November 2010

Sid the Sexist (real name Sidney Aloysius Smutt) is a character from the British satirical comic Viz, first appearing in issue 9 in October 1982. The strip was created and mostly drawn by Simon Donald until he left the magazine in 2003, when Paul Palmer took over as artist.

According to Donald, "Sid is a man who is unable to communicate with women. He is desperate to impress them, but is totally lacking in social skills. He thinks he must use foul and offensive chat-up lines on women to impress his friends, but can't see why they don't impress the girls. He tries to soften the blow of his outrageous behaviour with nice, friendly Geordie words. Sid thinks that a few "hinnys" and "pets" thrown liberally into his disgusting conversation will win the hearts of women. He usually ends up in hospital having painful procedures to remove things women have shoved where the sun doesn't shine."

== Character ==
Sid and his mates Baz, Bob, and Joe, who are all Geordies, spend much of their time hanging around at the pub, with Sid bragging to them continually about his apparent sexual prowess. Sid "spectacularly fail[s] in the pursuit to which he has single-mindedly committed himself: having sex." He is a coarse and unsophisticated 30-year-old virgin who still lives with his mother, a fact which often poses as a stumbling block to any potential liaison, and is unable or unwilling to use any kind of decorum when approaching women, instead using outrageously crude lines that never succeed in achieving anything beyond rejection or a violent response from the woman in question. In one of his most famous examples from an early issue of Viz, Sid approaches a woman with; "How, pet, my name's Sid. D'ya fancy a fuck?" When answered with a definite "No!", he replies "Well, would you mind lying down while I have one?"

The recurrent format of Sid's adventures is that he believes he has found a new approach to women that will secure him a sexual conquest at long last ('This time... this time! It HAS to be this time!!'). His attempts at trying out these questionable methods invariably end up with his being humiliated, often painfully. He is physically very unfit, has a prominent beer belly, drinks heavily, always has a cigarette in his mouth and is cowardly despite his macho pretensions, always coming off the worse in a fight. He is also in denial: despite the misfortunes that befall him he continues to display a blind faith in his crude attitude towards women and, when rejected, often tries to pass the blame for his failures on to the woman in question or somebody else. His exploits have also unintentionally led to several homosexual encounters.

Sid seems under-educated and knows little of the world outside Newcastle. It is even claimed at one point that he is unable to read. It is not clear what his job is, if indeed he has one at all, although he has been seen doing occasional odd jobs as part of his various schemes to pick up women. In another strip he attempts to pick up a woman by telling her that he works as 'an assistant to a well-established provider of goods to the younger end of the market'; despite being exposed as an elf in Santa's grotto in a local department store by his derisive mates, he still attempts to keep up the pretence that his job brings him success with women - "Y'see, lasses fancy summat [something] a bit special". Although Sid's three companions do sometimes succeed with women, they are much like him in their yobbish, misogynistic, homophobic outlook, never marry or expand their stagnant social circle.

== Recurring Characters ==
- Bob is a short man with a wide, flat head, a crooked nose, and a crew-cut whose outfit of choice is jeans and a hooded sweater. Bob thinks most highly of Sid, is often in awe of him and his alleged power over women, is normally the first to encourage Sid in his disastrous attempts at womanising, and usually believes all but the most feeble of Sid's excuses for his failures.
- Joe is the tough guy of the group due to his strength, large size, and limited intelligence, but he is a peaceful person, often the one who tries to break up the fights and disputes that break out between Sid, Bob, and Baz.
- Baz is the most successful of Sid's friends, often seen wearing a suit or jacket with parted hair and a moustache. Baz is much more openly sceptical about Sid's abilities with women than Bob and Joe, once referring to Sid as being "all talk and no tackle". He is the only one of Sid's friends who comes close to seeing through his hollow bragging and is not afraid to suggest to Sid's face that he is still a virgin, often resulting in the two falling out or fighting. Baz appears to resemble Adolf Hitler with his hair and moustache.

== Animation/Live Action ==
Five animated episodes were produced and released by Polygram Video in November 1992, with storylines taken from earlier comic strips. These were later reissued on DVD in 2004.

In the autobiography of Simon Donald's brother, the former Viz Editor Chris Donald, reference is made to attempts by actor Jimmy Nail to bring the character to life in a live action sitcom. However the idea went no further than a lunch meeting at Nail's home where it become clear that the plan was a non-starter and was unlikely to find a willing TV station to broadcast the show if it were written in the same style as the comic.

== Bibliography ==
- Donald, Chris. "Rude Kids: The Unfeasible Story of Viz". HarperCollins, 2004. ISBN 0-0071-9096-4
- Donald, Simon (21 October 2010). Him Off the Viz. Tonto Books. ISBN 978-1907183119.
