= Will Kevans =

British singer-songwriter and cartoonist

Will Kevans is a singer-songwriter and cartoonist. He was signed to Judy Collins' New York label, Wildflower Records and is married to the artist, Annie Kevans.

== Musical career ==
Kevans was born in Birmingham but spent part of his childhood in Germany. He moved to West Wales at the age of 10. After a short stint in the army, Kevans moved to London where he played guitar for The Gospel and played trumpet for Ska bands such as The Hot Knives and The Riffs. He established himself as a singer-songwriter and became involved in the acoustic music scene. For some time, Kevans had a residency at the 12 Bar Club.

In 2008 Kevans won the International Songwriting Competition with his song "Out There" and provided music for the computer game Scooby-Doo! Frights, Camera, Mystery!

Later that year, Kevans was a finalist in BBC London's 2012 Anthem competition with his song "London Fields".

Shortly after that, Kevans was selected to represent Ireland in the Karlshamn Song Contest where he came 4th. The programme was broadcast live throughout the Baltic region and Sweden.

In 2009, Kevans released his debut single "Dialling Tone" on IRL Records. Olivia Cole of the Sunday Times called the single a "Catchy debut single". The video for "Dialling Tone" stars Russell Tovey as an irresponsible boyfriend staying out all night.

Kevans played at CMJ in New York in October 2009 where he was spotted by a representative of Wildflower Records. He was offered a deal with the New York label that night.

Kevans' first album, Everything You Do, was produced by Ian Grimble. The album featured slide guitarist Al Perkins and guest vocals came from former Beautiful South songstress Alison Wheeler. Keyboard skills were provided by James Blunt's pianist Paul Beard and guitar was supplied by ex-Steely Dan and Doobie Brothers guitarist Elliot Randall.

The album was released in February 2010 and received much critical acclaim. Q Magazine said "The country flavoured singer-songwriter pop of London Will Kevans can be both delightful & sincere" and Guitarist magazine said Kevans "has a great voice & polished pop rock writing."

== Artistic career ==
Kevans has drawn well-known characters such as Billy No Mates and Postman Prat for Zit comic, Dennis the Menace for the BBC, and the Ribena berries. He was chosen to be the Labour Party's caricaturist for their conference in 1997. Tony Blair, Cherie Blair and Mo Mowlam were among the people who sat for him. Kevans' illustrations have appeared in many magazines and newspapers, including Penthouse, The Telegraph, The Sun and The Mirror.

In 2014, Kevans self-published a graphic novel entitled My Life in Pieces: The Falklands War. It is the story of a group of Welsh Guards thrown into the unknown and the untold tales from Two Company's advance on the mainland towards Port Stanley. This story recounts the tragedies on board the Sir Galahad and at Stanley airfield and the end of the conflict, when 500 Argentinian soldiers were taken back to the mainland on a cross-channel ferry, both sides singing Freddie Mercury classics to pass the time. The book now forms part of the Imperial War Museum's Archives. In 2017, Panorama commissioned a documentary on Kevans' book, using animation to bring some of the book's illustrations to life. The half-hour programme followed Kevans and his fellow ex-combatants back to the Falklands for an emotional journey which retraced their steps across the island. Original artwork from the graphic novel was exhibited at the Cartoon Museum in London for its exhibition entitled 'The Great British Graphic Novel'.

The book was positively received with Simon Weston (OBE) saying "My Life in Pieces is a brilliant perspective of one man's view of a time... I have read a number of books on the Falklands over the years and Will's book, I can honestly say, is one of my favourites". Forces TV wrote "Using his unique style, he has successfully navigated the irksome task of describing in visceral detail the bloody combat with the gritty banter and dark humour that is required of every guardsman."

In November 2014, Prince Harry saw Kevans' artwork at an exhibition at Westminster Abbey. The Prince also said "I might actually read that."

Major-General Clive 'Chip' Chapman CB BA, ex 2 Para and Platoon Commander at Goose Green said "Will Kevans captures the very human and very funny nature of the Welsh soldier, whilst never letting his humour mask the poignant tragedies that befell the battalion. An equal and engaging mix of pathos and ethos runs through this unique personal take on the Falklands War of 1982." Sean Rayment, former 3 Para Patrols Platoon Commander, journalist and author, agreed, saying "Will Kevans' book provides a unique perspective of the Falklands War through the eyes of the infantry soldier. It is a warm, witty and tragic record of a brief but bitter conflict which cost the lives of more than 900 servicemen from both the British and Argentinian armed forces. Using cartoons, often graphic, Kevans give us his take on the conflict, allowing the enduring and often dark humour of the British Squaddie to shine through. It is a must read for anyone interested in Britain's Wars."
