= Spit! (comics) =

Comic series

- Cover of issue No.4
- Format: Limited series
- Genre: Humor/comedy
- Publication date: 1994
- Editor(s): Graham Hey

Spit! was the name of a British adult comic that was published from 1994.

== Publication history ==
It was one of many such comics similar to Viz, and was also considerably cruder and of lower production quality than its inspiration, many strips ending with sexual humour. As well as comic strips, it also included photo strips, joke articles, celebrity references, and adverts for phone lines and mail-order products. Many of the publication's contributors had previously featured in the similar comic Zit, having abandoned the publication after being alienated by its editor.

== Contributors ==
One of its contributing writer/cartoonists was Allin Kempthorne who went on to become a television and film actor and writer. Another contributing writer/cartoonist was Gary Bell, who went on to become an addiction treatment activist and blogger , appearing in the 2014 documentary One Little Pill to talk about his experience of using The Sinclair Method to recover from a decades long battle with alcoholism.
