= Roger Mellie =

Publication information
- Publisher: Viz
- First appearance: July 1981
- Created by: Chris Donald

Roger Mellie ("The Man on the Telly – who says 'Bollocks!'") is a fictional character featured in Viz magazine. His catchphrase was originally the same as David Frost's catchphrase "Hello, good evening, and welcome", but very soon degenerated into "Hello, good evening and bollocks!". The character first appeared in Issue 6 in July 1981 and (like many other characters in Viz) is a foul-mouthed and obnoxious misogynist who manages to maintain a career as a television presenter, in spite of his objectionable personality and incompetence (he sees himself as highly professional, despite abundant evidence to the contrary). He is shown working on various TV networks and channels, the fictional Fulchester Television (FTV) and the BBC being his primary employers. He is the ostensible author of Roger's Profanisaurus (ISBN 1-902212-05-3), a parody of Roget's Thesaurus which is updated with extra entries in each edition of Viz and has been published several times under considerably risqué titles.

== Background ==
Viz's founder and main contributor Chris Donald has said that the character of Roger Mellie was inspired by the off-screen behaviour of Rod Griffith, a 1980s Tyne Tees Television presenter, but that Mellie is "nothing like" Griffith and other presenters have been worked into the character, including Look North presenter Mike Neville. One issue gave Roger's name as "Roger Michael Neville Mellie".

An animated TV series was released on VHS and also broadcast on Channel 4 in 1991, with Peter Cook providing the voice of Roger, and Harry Enfield voicing all the other characters. Roger also appeared in the 1991 Viz video game as the commentator for all the races.

It was said on a few occasions that Roger drove a Suzuki Swift 1.3GTi.

== Fictional biography ==
Born Roger Edward Paul Mellie in 1937 in North Shields, Roger was educated at Fulchester Mixed Infants, Bartlepool Grammar School, and the Oxford Remand Centre. He began his broadcasting career as a cub reporter on the news with Robert Dougall and shot to fame filling in for a poorly Bruce Forsyth on Saturday Night at the London Palladium with his "Last Turkey in the Shop" routine, featuring genital mutilation routines. Recruited by Fulchester Television he became a popular TV personality and established his own production company, MellieVision. Mellie was frequently pulled over for drink-driving and, in 1986, he ran over and killed a bus queue. He often stays at his favourite lap-dancing club in Acton until past 3am, but lives in Fulchester with his 17-year-old Thai wife and fifteen Staffordshire Bull Terriers. He has had five previous wives (two "accidentally" murdered) and is a convicted rapist, undischarged bankrupt, a hopeless alcoholic, extremely sexist, very right-wing, a bigot and a recovering cocaine addict. He owned a restaurant in Stoke Newington with Alex Higgins, George Best and Chris Quinten. He once almost died while unveiling a plaque, but was resuscitated by the nurses in hospital, and promptly ordered his breakfast - sausages, fried bread, fried eggs, black pudding and several other heart-destroying items.

Roger's straight man is Tom, in early strips, a director or producer, later a portmanteau figure, an agent for Roger or a television executive, to suit the situation. In one issue, he has a sign reading "Tom - Straight Man". One of Roger's defining features is that he will always arrive very late, regardless of if it is to a job or simply a meeting, despite Tom making desperate attempts to make sure Roger understands the importance of being on time (leading to Tom's catchphrase of "Where the Hell is Roger?"). Roger usually arrives announcing "Sorry I'm late, Tom". In one strip, Tom imagines Roger has arrived on time only to discover that it is a life-size cardboard cutout, and, on another occasion, Tom is utterly shocked as Roger arrives two minutes early - but then he wakes up. Roger and Tom have crossed over into the Billy the Fish strip occasionally before realising they are in the wrong page. They are used in other Viz strips when a reporter or narrator is needed and, on these occasions, Roger is generally (although not always) without his usual lecherous and/or violent behaviour.

On one occasion in 2006, while requiring a liver transplant (due to chronic alcoholism), Roger became a hit-and-run driver: he ran over and killed a motorcyclist without stopping, later receiving the dead man's liver for himself, then celebrating the successful liver transplant with a booze-up at the nearest pub. Sometimes the strip follows current or recent events: in a parody of the kidnapping of Alan Johnston, Roger is kidnapped in Beirut, but after eight days it turns out to be an attempt to seek publicity. Tom discovers that the BBC is in on the deception and reluctantly takes part by being a fake phone-in contestant on Radio 4. In 2011, due to recent news stories revolving around celebrities taking out super injunctions in an attempt to protect themselves from scandal, Roger goes to his crooked solicitor attempting to silence his ex-wife from releasing a book about their violent marriage which also details Roger's "questionable" hobbies. However, it emerges he is not trying to silence his wife to protect himself, but is actually releasing this information himself in a new autobiography and he does not want her to cash in before him. In 2015, following the high amount of media attention following Jeremy Clarkson punching a producer (memorably referred to as a "fracas"), the strip showed Roger entering his office just before he is due to renegotiate his contract to present Roger Mellie's Skidmarks and punching Tom in the face. As Tom attempts to recover, Roger organizes the ensuing scandal and his recovery to ensure a lucrative contract. When meeting the Director General of FTV in the cafeteria, Roger turns up drunk and is delighted to be told his show is being recommissioned for five years along with a huge salary increase. However, Roger then is told there is no hot food available (another reference to the incident with Clarkson), causing him to fly into a rage and then punch the Director General too. In another strip, Roger finally finds mainstream success by presenting Bargain Hunt only to have it ruined when a dead body is fished out of his swimming pool. However, despite whatever misfortunes and/or scandals might befall him, Roger never learns his lesson and his TV career always remains intact.

Roger has also appeared in several other parodies of real TV shows, including a stint as presenter of Springwatch whilst Bill Oddie was in hospital after Roger had accidentally shot him. Roger's version of the show consisted of him launching live rabbits from a catapult for Jack Charlton and Ted Nugent to shoot. Usually, Roger has little success hosting mainstream shows but often suggests pornographic reworkings of well-known shows, which against all odds prove successful. Another episode has a considerably elderly Roger (grey/white hair and most teeth missing) having fronted Fulchester News for a considerable number of years; but he decides that he cannot abhor such a thing and gets himself a wig and a whole set of false teeth. In the last panel he is shown fronting Fulchester Tonight, with the false teeth clacking dreadfully as he attempts to be much more youthful.

== Selected TV shows ==
(Note that the links direct to the genuine show on which Roger's version was based.)

- Bargain Cunt
- Blind Shag
- Blue Roger
- Blinkety Blank
- Pimp My Ride
- Call My Muff
- Challenge Roger
- The Bristol Maze
- Cuntdown
- The Mellie Report
- Celebrity Bumhole
- Whose Line Is It Now?
- Marbles Up Their Arseholes
- Farting About With Mellie
- Celebrity Shit In A Bucket
- MellieTubbies
- Look Fulchester
- Fuck A Duck
- Blowing The Lid Off Britain's Brothels
- Who Wants To Be A Millionaire?
- Roger Mellie's Live Russian Roulette
- 'Roger', daytime show
- Jackass UK
- The Bollock Naked Chef
- Pano-fucking-rama
- Who Do You Think You Are?
- Celebrity Genital Mutilation
- Girls of the Razzle House
- The News in Black and White
- Roger's Big-Game Show
- Dirtbox Jury
- Britain's Got Piles
- Rog'll Sort It
- Roger Mellie's Skidmarks

=== TV series ===
The 1991 animated TV series had four episodes.

- Episode 1, Celebrity Bumhole:

Due to an "administrative error", Roger has been asked by the BBC to present the Antiques Roadshow, but arrives late as he claimed that there is "some sort of fucking jumble sale" in the hall: Tom tells him that it is part of the programme. After being introduced to the antiques expert, Hedley Smedley-Smythe, they look at a vase, but Roger breaks one of its handles off. Then, they look at an old wooden chair which Roger sits on and breaks to pieces due to his weight. Next, he is in the office with the boss who gives him one more chance to change his behaviour. The next day, at the FTV studios, Roger presents a kids' TV show called Blue Roger (a parody of Blue Peter) along with a ginger-haired kid. They have a look at some puppies and Roger exclaims that one of them has a "little penis!" Tom then asks Roger to go to the producer's office, where he is fired. At the bar, Roger has an idea for a game show (Celebrity Bumhole) and the head of BBC1's early evening programmes hires him for £500,000 a year. The next day, he presents Blinkety Blank (a parody of Blankety Blank) but this ends after he punches one of the contestants (Paul Daniel), who made fun of Roger's baldness. Later at the bar, Roger tells Tom that he is writing an autobiography called They Don't Call Me Roger for Nothing, but Tom says that it cannot be published because it is "disgusting", although a man from the News of the World says that they will serialise his book in their newspaper and pay him £50,000. He then tells Roger that they have job vacancies for TV presenters on Sky TV.

- Episode 2, Celebrity Golf:

On Sunday morning, Tom phones Roger from the golf club to remind him about participating in FTV's first annual Celebrity Golf tournament. Roger tells him he will be there in twenty minutes, but he finally arrives in a golf cart two hours later. Tom tells him that it is for charity and that they are already four hours behind schedule. Tom introduces Roger to Jimmy Tarbrush and Bruce Fivesyth, and Roger tries to get a drink from the clubhouse to avoid playing golf for free. During the game, Roger tries to tell Tarby a rude joke, but Tom reminds him that it is a family show. Then Roger breaks one of Brucie's drivers while taking his shot. While Brucie takes his shot, Roger is trying to find his "bastard ball" and when Brucie's ball lands in a bunker, he finds Roger "having a dump" in it. Eventually, on the green, Brucie and Tarby have putted and after Roger is finished, he goes off to the clubhouse for a drink, but Tom tells him that it was only the first hole and there are still another seventeen to play. However, Roger carries on regardless as he cannot be bothered to play anymore. The group carry on without him and Brucie wins the tournament. A very drunk Roger congratulates Brucie for winning the tournament and vomits on him.

- Episode 3, Challenge Roger:

Roger (who is between jobs) is at home watching the TV when Challenge Anneka comes on; this gives him an idea to make his own version of the programme, called Challenge Roger. The next day, in his office, he tells Tom about his show which is for charity. Roger gets a tracksuit, camera, mobile phone and an old yellow van with Challenge Roger in red lettering. The plan is to build a swimming pool in just 24 hours (for the "orphaned kids and old folks") at Roger's house. Roger tries to phone a builder using his mobile phone, which malfunctions, and they have to find a phone box. On the way, they stop at an off-licence in an attempt to get some free lager and cigarettes, but the salesman says that he can only sell them and Roger insults him in front of the camera. Eventually, they finally find a phone box and when they finally get an Irish builder called Mr. Murphy to do the job, they only have 18 hours left to build the pool. As the builder starts the job, Roger and Tom head down to the pub for a few drinks and after telling the barman that he will mention his pub on the telly, he gives them the drinks free of charge. When they return, the builder is finished with about a minute to spare. After thanking him for the job, Roger says that they will flog the programme to the BBC and keep the money for themselves.

- Episode 4, The Crook Report:

One morning, at FTV, Challenge Roger has been such a success and Roger is asked to present The Crook Report (a parody of The Cook Report) after Roger Cook gets beaten up, but before rushing into it, Tom tells him to be calm, sympathetic and tactful at all times. Soon, in Tom's car, they arrive in a poor area to investigate the slum landlord who owns a block of flats. One resident, 84-year-old Mrs Parker, lives alone and is very frightened because the landlord has been trying to evict her. Roger tries to interview Mrs Parker, but she wants him to go away. However, Roger breaks the door down and scares her to death. Next, they have a word with the landlord, Mr McKenzie. Roger tries to refresh his memory about the tenants but is told to talk to his solicitor. Then, the police arrive but they arrest Roger instead of Mr McKenzie. The next day, in Tom's office, Roger reveals he was fined £250 by the police, but Tom tells him to forget it. Kenneth Spanner has had to drop out of Whose Line Is It Now? (a parody of Whose Line Is It Anyway?) to perform a heart bypass operation, and Roger is asked to replace him. Then, on the show, Roger wants to see the script, but Tom tells him that there is no script as it is spontaneous improvisation. Roger gets annoyed with the contestant beside him (a parody of Whose Line panellist John Sessions), and after being asked by Clive Sanderson to improvise a poem about changing a light bulb, he does it in the style of Muhammad Ali. However, this ends with him punching the contestant beside him and calling him a "Scottish twat!"
