= Smut (comics) =

British adult comics magazine

- Cover of issue №42, 1994

Publication information
- Publisher: Arf Cartoons
- Schedule: Bimonthly
- Format: Ongoing series
- Publication date: May 1989–2007
- No. of issues: 153
- Editor(s): Tom Fulep and Clive Ward

Smut was a British adult comics magazine that was launched on 1 May 1989.

== Publication history ==
"Smut" is an English term for any form of media that is considered profane or offensive, particularly with regards to sexual content. Smut comic was named as such for good reason.

The comic was similar to Viz, although was considered to be a downmarket copycat of Viz, being less subtle and lacking in Viz's surreal satire, and printed on lower quality paper.

In July 2007, Smut relaunched as Twisted! incorporating Smut. Despite the name change, the comic's content remained broadly similar, and included reprinting earlier material. The title stopped publishing shortly afterwards.

In 1991, the editors of Smut also released a children's version of the comic titled Acne.

== Content ==
Its strips were usually heavily violent, full of profanity and with themes many may regard as being politically incorrect. Its flagship character was "Everard Edbutt", a heavily built skinhead who, despite his cheerfully moronic nature, tended to get very violent when anyone bothered him. His surreal strength invariably meant he horribly mutilated people without much effort, such as by punching someone in the face with such force that his fist bursts through the back of their head.

Other characters, who invariably had self-explanatory names, included:

- Tactless Terence – a man who is incapable of good manners or being tactful.
- Sarky Marky – an incredibly sarcastic man.
- Psycho Sid – a grinning psychopath who ends every strip by viciously murdering someone for no reason.
- Fat Idle Bastard – a total slob who is as unproductive as he is greedy, deceitful and sexist.
- The Skeggys – similar to the Viz's Biffa Bacon, a family of immoral, overweight benefit claimants.
- Twatman and Nobbin – an obvious parody of Batman (Twatman is an older sexist pig while Nobbin is a young and inexperienced nerd).
- Klaus The Louse – Pubic Enemy Number One — the travels of a pubic louse.
- Lionel Lettuces and his Sexual Fetishes

The cartoonist Dave Colton contributed many 'one-off' strips to the comic in the early 1990s.
