= The Fat Slags =

Publication information
- Publisher: Viz
- First appearance: 1989
- Created by: Graham Dury

The Fat Slags is a British comic strip appearing in the alternative British comic Viz. The characters made their debut in 1989, their first appearance being in issue 36. The eponymous slags are Sandra Burke and Tracey Tunstall, known to other characters as San and Tray. They are depicted as overweight, eating large amounts of food, mainly chips, while also having a lot of casual sex. As with other Viz strips, the strip's authors use a brash writing style. "Slag" is a British English word for "slut", or loose woman.

== Activities ==
The Slags' eating frequently follows a night of binge drinking, and the circumstances of the sex or the partner in question are rarely an issue – they have been known to leap on delivery men or workmen for gratification, with the targeted man rarely given an opportunity to resist or escape. Both slags regularly enjoy carnal relations with Baz (full name Barrington Askwith, seemingly as a nod to the actor Robin Askwith), a local jobless dropout who divides his time between drinking, committing crime, and having sex with San and Tray. Baz's good-natured wife, Thelma Haystacks-Askwith (daughter of Horace Haystacks), often finds out that Baz is cheating on her, but invariably forgives him. The other major character in the strip is Baz's slightly more successful friend, Dave, who works as a refuse collector but obtains most of his income through benefit fraud.

Whilst most Viz characters are recognisably from North East England, with the comic largely written in Geordie dialect, the Fat Slags and their friends converse with a Nottingham accent. This originates with the characters' creator Graham Dury who, unlike the Geordie founder of Viz, is originally from that area.

Both characters are noticeably warm-hearted and easy-going, and their friendship is never undermined by their conquests. Although both of the Slags are somewhat stupid – albeit good-natured – nymphomaniacs, Tray is marginally more intelligent and literate than San, who is marginally more nymphomaniacal than Tray. These factors, combined with Tray's more dominant personality, make Tray the leader and San the follower in their adventures. One strip parodying the Batman films featured Tray as Batslag and San as Nobbin. In another strip, San got pregnant and brought the baby to term, tearfully vowing that she was prepared to make any sacrifice for her daughter's happiness. In the very next panel, realising that motherhood would conflict with her pub-crawling, she gave up the baby for adoption.

Tray normally wears tight-fitting Capri pants whilst San normally wears a too-small skirt; since the latter garment has more potential for jokes, San tends to get involved in more slapstick than Tray does. Although neither Slag has ever refused alcoholic refreshment in any setting, their favourite place to tipple is the "Dog and Hammer" pub, somewhere in Fulchester. Their run-down home – with its floor-level collection of alcohol cans, takeaway containers and cigarette butts – is at 22, Shit Street, Fulchester, which once featured as a porcelain model marketed by Viz in parody of products such as those of Franklin Mint.

A running gag is that the Slags will accuse any men unwilling to sleep with them of being homosexuals and/or having small penises, and many other women of being unattractive and overweight.

== Social context ==
Their excessive lifestyle is a parody of British ladette culture. Viz creator Chris Donald refers to this in his book, where he also mentions that the portrayal of the Slags was criticised by feminists writing in the Guardian newspaper. At the time of these criticisms the Fat Slags had not appeared in the comic for more than a year, but as a direct response to the criticism they were immediately revived for the next issue, in which they had a humorous run-in with the feminist Millie Tant. Donald later questioned why the Guardian had slated the portrayals of the Slags, but had not mentioned that the two male characters were portrayed as a cheating layabout and a fraudster, and that the strip's only "well-behaved" character, Thelma, was a woman.

Tunnel Boring Machines to construct the Jubilee underground line in London ("fat slugs") were named after the Fat Slags.

== Merchandise ==
The characters once appeared in a UK television advert for energy drink Lucozade, saying "Get it out of our fridge!" in unison.

== Animated version ==
In 1992, stop motion animated shorts were produced for PolyGram Video, with Jo Unwin voicing Tracey, Kathy Burke as Sandra, and Simon Day as Baz. The episodes, "Slags at Large", "Working Girls", and "Dirty Weekend", were first released on VHS in November 1992 and were later compiled on DVD in 2004 as Oh Lordy! It's The Fat Slags. 1994 saw the release of Return of the Fat Slags in Blue Honeymoon, this time with Jenny Eclair voicing Tracey.

== Fat Slags: The Film ==
In 2004, Entertainment Film Distributors released a film adaptation of the comic strip. It included cameo appearances from numerous well-known personalities, including Geri Halliwell (as Paige), Naomi Campbell (sales assistant), Angus Deayton (Maurice the hotel receptionist) and Dolph Lundgren (Randy).

It was reported that the strip's artist, Graham Dury, was so demoralised by the treatment of his creations that he announced that he was dropping them from the comic altogether. This was actually a misquote by an over-enthusiastic press officer and there was no intention of dropping the characters. Dury did not watch the film.
