= Zit (comic) =

Comic

- Issue No. 1, February 1991

Publication information
- Publisher: Humour Publications UK
- Format: Limited series
- Genre: Humor/comedy
- Publication date: February 1991 – May 2002
- No. of issues: 143
- Editor: Russell Church

Zit is an adult British comic that was published by Humour Publications UK, beginning with a free sample issue in January 1991, then issue number 1 the following month. The final issue, number 143, was published in May 2002.

Zit was one of many such comics similar to Viz, and was also of lower production quality than its inspiration. As well as comic strips, it also included photo strips, joke articles, celebrity references, and adverts for phone lines and mail order products, many of a pornographic or sexual nature.

== History ==
The owner of Humour Publications, Russell Church, attempted to stir up an aggressive rivalry between his publication and the far more successful Viz, but, as Viz editor Chris Donald stated in his autobiography, "Church's magazine was so bad he couldn't give the thing away". In 1993, Church sued another Viz clone, the Huddersfield-based Spit!, for "passing itself off" as Zit. He pursued the case all the way to the High Court, where the judge ruled that nobody "with reasonable apprehension or eyesight" could confuse the two comics. Church was ordered to pay Spit!'s legal bills, which came to around £32,000. Soon after this setback, Church was sued by the British TV presenter Anne Diamond, following a tasteless reference in Zit to her child's tragic cot death. This effectively sank Humour Publications, and Zit continued with a different publisher's backing before vanishing from the shelves in 2002.

== Notable strips ==
More notable characters included: "Lambrusco - the Alcoholic Sheep", "Dirty Stan the Blue Movie Man", "The man who collects eyeballs", and "Middle aged Melvin".

== Contributors ==
Allin Kempthorne wrote and drew several features including the semi-regular strip Starface. He went on to become a television and film actor and writer.

Leon Horton created and wrote many characters, including Hector Rectum, Dave Beef and The Ales of Beer Tits Potter.

Ged Purvis, a one time commercial artist, drew Young Tarby who went on to become a television and film actor, writer, and director and also a book illustrator.

== In other media ==
A video called Zit: The Video was produced in 1993, featuring many of its characters in five-minute animated segments in which they were Motion comics rather than actual animation. the animations were made digitally in Photon Paint, all of the characters from the Zit comics were both voiced by David Holt and Rob Rackstraw, although uncredited.

An audio cassette tape entitled "An Earful of Zit" was also released in 1993 and was marketed and distributed by PolyGram Record Operations Ltd. It was described on the cover as "fifty minutes of audio madness". It was written by Ged Backland, Leon Horton, Dave Iddon, Paul Dyson and Anthony Smith. It was produced for Polygram by Leo Cubbin and Ged Backland and recorded at Rainbow Studios in Brighton.
