= Simon Donald =

British magazine editor

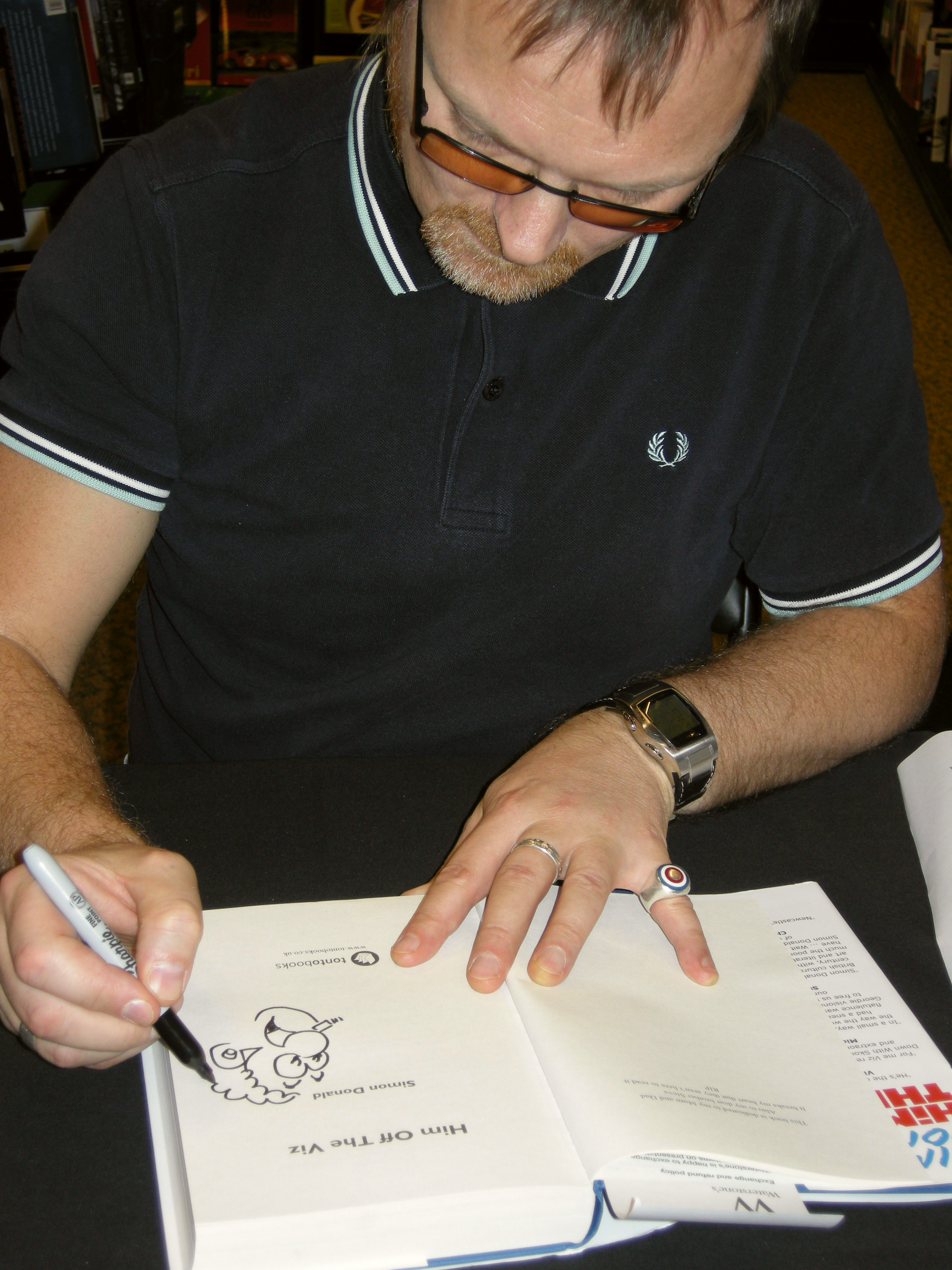
- Simon Donald drawing Sid the Sexist in a copy of his book, Him off the Viz
- Born: 1964 (age 61–62)
- Occupation: Comedian
- Known for: Co-founder of Viz
- Website: simondonald.com

Simon Donald is a co-founder and former co-editor of the British comic magazine Viz.

He set up the magazine Viz in 1979 with his brother Chris from a bedroom in Newcastle. His most famous creation for the magazine is probably Sid the Sexist.

When Chris quit as editor in 1999, Simon took up the role of co-editor along with Graham Dury, Simon Thorp, Davey Jones, and Alex Collier. He and Collier left the magazine in 2003.

== Biography ==
Donald was born in Newcastle upon Tyne in 1964. He attended West Jesmond Infant School (1969–1973), West Jesmond Junior School (1973–1975), Heaton Secondary School (1975–1980, comprehensive), and Newcastle College of Arts & Technology (1981–1983).

In 1976, Donald joined Newcastle’s People’s Theatre, training in theatre skills. He acted in several of the theatre’s Young People’s Theatre productions. He worked as assistant stage manager for the Royal Shakespeare Company on their People's Theatre visit in 1977. He also performed at the Gulbenkian Theatre. He left the People's Theatre in 1980.

Between 1981 and 1983, Donald acted as singer and lyricist for comedy rock band Johnny Shiloe’s Movement Machine. The band comprised Dave Rose (composition and drums), Paul Rose (guitar), and Gary Shaw (bass).

In 1981, Donald appeared in an episode of BBC Two’s Something Else programme. In 1983, he co-wrote and appeared in an episode Sparks, also on BBC Two.

He specialised as an antagonist on Carlton Television's live debate programmes in the early 1990s, and moved on to play important roles in the BBC’s I Love series and Channel 4’s 100 Greatest.

In 2004, he presented The Regionnaires, a six-part north-east regional panel show broadcast on ITV Tyne Tees, which he co-wrote with his former Viz partner Alex Collier.

In 2005, he met Hungover Stuntmen and in 2006 joined their management team. He became their sole manager in 2007. The band recorded an album in Ibiza, played the Ibiza Rocks festival two years running and appeared at Newcastle Arena with Paul Weller. His work with the band stopped when Simon became full-time caregiver for his eldest brother Steve, who was diagnosed with cancer in the summer of 2008, and died the following November.

== Stand-up comedy ==
In 2005, Donald started performing stand-up comedy, initially working the circuit in Tyne and Wear, where he compèred both The Horse’s Mouth in Newcastle and Mack’em Laugh in Sunderland. After taking a break to care for his terminally ill brother, Donald returned to stand-up comedy, beginning to appear on stage as the characters he had previously talked about in his routine. He soon picked up representation by Off the Kerb, one of the largest producers and managers of comedy in the United Kingdom.

In the summer of 2009, Donald moved to London to work the city's comedy circuit. He continued to perform around the United Kingdom, including runs at the Edinburgh Festival Fringe in 2009 and 2010. He performed his Sold Out solo show in Newcastle. In 2012–13, he hosted spoof-panel show Fuckwits at The Stand Comedy Club in Newcastle.
