= Bonio =

British dog biscuit brand

- Product type: Dog biscuits
- Current owner: Nestlé Purina PetCare
- Country: United Kingdom
- Introduced: 1932
- Previous owners: Spratt's
- Website: Official website

Bonio is a brand of dog biscuit sold in the United Kingdom. It was originally sold by Spratts Patent Ltd. of London some 75 years ago, but through various acquisitions, it is now marketed by Nestlé Purina PetCare. Bonio is produced in Aintree, Liverpool.

== History ==
Since 1932, Bonio biscuits have been traditionally oven-baked.

According to 'Scotsman,' UK News outlet; “One Bonio dog biscuit has 78 calories, about 7 per cent of an adult Labrador's daily allowance, if it is exercised normally. This is similar to a KitKat Chunky, which has 207 calories – 8 per cent of an adult man's recommended daily calorie intake.”
