= Billy the Fish =

Publication information
- Publisher: Viz
- First appearance: 1983; 43 years ago
- Created by: Chris Donald

Billy the Fish is a long-running cartoon strip in the British comic Viz that first appeared in 1983. Created by artist Chris Donald and writer Simon Thorp (who later took on both roles), Billy the Fish is, like many Viz strips, a lampoon of British comics – in Billy the Fish's case, that of football-themed strips such as Roy of the Rovers. The cartoon was adapted into an animated film by Channel 4 in 1990.

== Background ==
The strip chronicles the football team Fulchester United (Fulchester is the name of the fictional town where many of Viz's characters live, first used by Crown Court). Originally the strip was produced in serial format, a rarity for Viz, but later became an occasional strip, usually appearing when major tournaments were being played or parodying major incidents in the world of football. The strip returned to its serial format for six months in 2007 as a result of a sponsorship deal with bookmakers betNOW, who were advertised in a deliberately ridiculous manner in each strip that they sponsored.

Characters include:

- Billy Thompson, the main character. Despite being born half-man, half fish, he has managed to have a long and successful career as a goalkeeper for Fulchester United. Essentially, Billy is a human head (complete with mullet hairstyle) on a fish's body, who inexplicably floats approximately five feet above the ground, and propels himself with his fins and tail. The first Billy was killed saving a booby-trapped ball in an FA Cup final, but was replaced by his son, who was also called Billy and happened to look exactly like his father. However, after going back in time, the original Billy was resurrected and everything returned to normal.
- Tommy Brown, the team manager. A bluff, no-nonsense type in a sheepskin jacket, Tommy is the second-most used character – in the past he has had open heart surgery on the pitch and (coinciding with Channel 4's The Manageress starring Cherie Lunghi) was revealed to be a woman in disguise. His catchphrase is "someone's out to make trouble for Fulchester United. The question is who?"
- Syd Preston, the team coach. Syd is usually a hapless straight man trying to make sense of events. Syd was born in Scotland, so he speaks with a Scottish accent.
- Rick Spangle, the millionaire pop star and chairman. In one strip, Spangle was revealed to be a Martian determined to get Billy to sign for his team Dynamo Mars, but of course this plot thread was never expanded upon.
- Brown Fox, a scantily clad huge-breasted Native American woman who plays as a winger.
- Johnny X, the invisible striker. His father was killed in a childhood accident, so Johnny has been invisible ever since.
- Terry Jackson, the unsettled amateur marksman reserve team keeper. Billy replaced him as Fulchester's first choice goalkeeper, and Jackson has since spent much time attempting to kill or otherwise discredit Billy in order to gain his place back. In the first episode of the series, Jackson shot what everyone thought was Billy, but it was actually a balloon of Billy. Later in the book series, he joined Grimthorpe City and teamed up with evil Gus Parker and Wilf his henchman to discredit Fulchester United and kill Billy Thompson for revenge.
- Professor Wolfgang Schnell BSc. PhD., a mad scientist who usually only shoots for goal after working out the best trajectory he should kick the ball at, achieving this with a calculator, various charts and a geometry set.
- Evil Gus Parker, boss of Grimthorpe City (Fulchester's arch rivals.) Parker is often behind highly contrived schemes to discredit Fulchester United. He sports a checkered cap, sunglasses, heavy stubble and is "dentally challenged".
- Wilf - Evil Gus Parker's henchman. Wilf helps his boss to discredit Fulchester United so Grimthorpe City can become winners of the league trophy.
- Shakin' Stevens, the famous pop star signed for Fulchester in an early strip, parodying the time when Spandau Ballet signed up for Melchester Rovers, the team featured in Roy of the Rovers. He was later joined by Mick Hucknall, the frontman for Simply Red.
- A pair of conjoined twins, who scored a vital equalising goal in one game. The referee decided that because of their condition the goal counted double, resulting in Fulchester winning the game.
- Maxwell Baxter a supposed "ruthless millionaire," whose schemes always appear to spell trouble for Fulchester United. Despite appearing in many strips, the real Baxter has never been seen, as he always turns out to in fact be a cardboard replica with a hidden tape recorder (except for one appearance where he was upgraded to a waxwork dummy with a concealed CD player). This started a repeating gag about threats to the main characters always turning out to be cardboard cut-outs of the real person. Based primarily on Robert Maxwell.
- Rex Findley - A blind 64-year-old man. He scores 13 goals in the second half using a jet powered ball (controlled by Billy in the first episode). He also appears later on in the book only.

== Plot elements ==
As the above characters suggest, plot elements in the strip are frequently nonsensical, inconsistent, and highly contrived, often being set up and then forgotten about for no reason. They include:

- Surreal turns of events, especially in order to make ludicrous cop-outs from cliffhangers. For example, at the end of one strip, a game in Japan is interrupted by Mothra, the giant beast from the Godzilla movies. At the start of the strip in the next issue it is swiftly revealed that it was actually just a harmless cardboard cut-out of Mothra. Everyone sighs with relief and the game continues. On more than one occasion, characters have awakened from perilous situations to discover it was "just a dream" (e.g. "So... it was all a dream?"; "Yes, apart from the bit about playing for England.").
- Satire of the tendency in football fiction to have impossibly competent teams steamrollering their way through the competition. Fulchester usually win a game with scores of around 5-0 – but if Billy is not in goal they instead lose by the same margin. One strip, lampooning the "back from the brink" plotline, had Fulchester narrowly beating a team of paperboys (because their goalkeeper's mother called him in for his tea) and then moving on to the FA Cup final the next day.
- Incidents relating to real-life events in British football. For example, Billy the Fish often adopts the current hairstyle of footballing celebrities such as Paul Gascoigne or David Beckham. On another occasion, Billy shouted a tirade of abuse at Tommy Brown, for daring to order him to tie his shoelaces (even though Billy, not having feet, does not wear shoes.) This prompted Brown to drop Billy from the team, which mimicked the incident whereby Irish footballer Roy Keane was dropped from his team and sent home from the 2002 World Cup for hurling abuse at his manager.
- References to the strip's supposed unpopularity amongst Viz readers. In one strip Tommy Brown drops his trousers and defecates on his desk to prove that no-one is reading.
- A "spot the difference" version of the strip, the differences from the normal version being extremely obvious; for instance, the strip is titled "Pilly the Fish", Syd Preston suddenly appears nude in one panel, and Tommy Brown is replaced by Adolf Hitler.

== Book and episode cliffhangers ==
The book episodes invariably end with a cliffhanger which is resolved in the next issue in one or two panels. For instance, when manager Tommy Brown revealed that he was actually a woman in disguise, the following episode had her leaving the country forever and being replaced by her identical twin brother.

- When someone stole a bag containing the gate money, which Syd Preston had left on a table beneath a small air vent, it was theorised that only a contortionist from the local circus could have entered the room. However, Syd then realised that, now that he thought about it, he had actually left the bag on a different table - where indeed it was.
- Billy was convicted of the murder of his wife and children and was about to be executed. In the nick of time his family turned up to prove that they were not dead; they had merely been out shopping.

The television series had cliffhangers at the end of each of the four episodes that were broadcast:

Episode One

The team are given a lift to Rossdale Stadium in Rick Spangle's jet plane. Suddenly, Spangles peels off his head to reveal an alien underneath it. The team discover they are his prisoners and that the plane is going to Mars...

Episode Two

Billy is at a death camp in Botslavia. He has been sent there for a punishment for signing a written confession to crimes perpetrated against the Botslavian states. Several guns are pointed at him, and Billy says: "Oh, well. This looks like the end." Once given the orders, the soldiers open fire...

Episode Three

Gus Parker announces that when the match takes place on Saturday, Grimthorpe City will win the league trophy, and no fish, large breasted Indian or invisible striker is going to stop them...

Episode Four

The narrator explains that the final whistle had blown before the ball had crossed the line, which means that Grimthorpe City are champions of the league trophy. But he is wrong. The referee apologizes for blowing the whistle. He was just testing it. Fulchester are champions of the league trophy.

== Animated film ==
Billy The Fish was made into an animated movie by Channel 4 in 1990. It told the story of how Billy joined Fulchester United. When it aired on Channel 4 in June 1990, it was shown as a full omnibus film. It was shown again on Channel 4 in January 1991, however this time it was split into four episodes and featured the voice of comedian Harry Enfield. The programme aired every Saturday from 8 to 22 January from 5:00 to 5:30. This then spawned "The Viz Billy the Fish Football Yearbook", which described itself as The Official Book of the cartoon of the Comic of the Channel 4 T.V. series of the cartoon Billy the Fish.

All the characters were voiced in Scouse accents (apart from Syd, who had a Scottish accent). It was the only Viz cartoon to get a "U" certificate on its release, rather than "18" as the other Viz videos earned (or 15 in the case of Roger Mellie). When they were updated for DVD release in 2004, Billy the Fish was the only one not to get its own release, instead being included as an extra feature on the Roger Mellie DVD. In the second episode of Billy the Fish, Roger Mellie made a cameo on a television.

== Other uses ==
- During his time in the Royal Air Force, Prince William was nicknamed Billy the Fish, a pun on his name and his father's title (Prince of Wales). The nickname also became his callsign.
- In the 2018 crime film King of Thieves, Michael Gambon's character Billy Lincoln is nicknamed Billy the Fish.
- In the 1975 film The Man Who Would Be King, Saeed Jaffrey's character Machendra Bahadur Gurung is also known as "Billy Fish".
