= Graham Dury =

British cartoonist

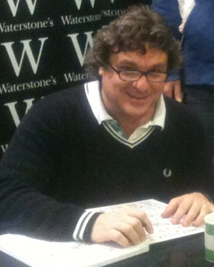
- Graham Dury signing The Cleveland Steamer annual
- Born: 1 June 1962 (age 64) Clifton, Nottinghamshire
- Areas: Writer, Penciller, Editor
- Notable works: The Fat Slags

Graham Dury (born 1962 in Clifton, Nottingham) is a British cartoonist. He is known for his work with Viz, having contributed to the magazine from its early years. He co-conceived and personally created The Fat Slags, one of the magazine's most famous strips.

Dury earned a degree in botany in Nottingham, and then enrolled in a PhD programme at the University of Leicester. While genetically engineering tomato and tobacco plants for disease and drought resistance, he was the first cartoonist to be offered a full-time job at Viz by co-creator Chris Donald in April 1988, when royalties began to make the magazine a profitable business. However, Dury had been contributing to Viz since as early as 1985, often delivering his cartoons by hand to Donald's house. Early creations, Donald noted, tended to have names that rhymed such as Tristam Banks and his Jocular Pranks or Albert Gordon the Traffic Warden. He also noted Dury's fondness of, and impressive ability to draw, cowboy boots.

Dury originally worked with Donald in Donald's small office (formerly his bedroom) at his parents' house in Jesmond. As the success of the comic book grew he became a member of the so-called Viz editorial cabinet, theoretically headed by Chris Donald, but which also included - for most of its run - Dury, Simon Donald and Simon Thorp.

Dury currently draws such comic series Biffa Bacon, Spoilt Bastard, Postman Plod and Roger Mellie. He took over drawing the latter strip from Chris Donald when he gave up day-to-day duties in 1999.
