= Viz (comics) =

British adult comic magazine

- Cover of Issue 340

Publication information
- Publisher: Diamond Publishing (Metropolis International)
- Format: Adult
- Publication date: December 1979 – present
- No. of issues: 350 (as of November 2025)

Viz is a British adult comic magazine founded in 1979 by Chris Donald. It parodies British comics of the post-war period, notably The Beano and The Dandy, but with extensive profanity, toilet humour, black comedy, surreal humour and generally sexual or violent storylines. It also sends up tabloid newspapers, with mockeries of articles and letters pages. It features parody competitions and advertisements for overpriced 'limited edition' tat, as well as obsessions with half-forgotten kitsch celebrities from the 1960s to the 1980s, such as Shakin' Stevens and Rodney Bewes. Occasionally, it satirises current affairs and politicians, but it has no particular political standpoint.

Its success in the early 1990s led to the appearance of numerous rivals copying the format Viz pioneered; none of them managed to attain its popularity. Circulation peaked at 1.2 million in the early 1990s, making it the third-most popular magazine in the UK, but ABC-audited sales have since dropped, to an average of 48,588 per issue in 2018. The 300th issue was published in October 2020.

== History ==
Logo of Viz

The comic was started in Newcastle upon Tyne in December 1979 by Chris Donald, who produced the comic from his bedroom in his parents' Jesmond home with help from his brother Simon and friend Jim Brownlow. Donald himself cannot remember exactly where the name of the magazine comes from. The most he can remember is: at the time, he needed to come up with a proper name for it, and he considered the word "Viz" a very easy word to write/remember, as it consisted of three letters which are easily made with straight lines.

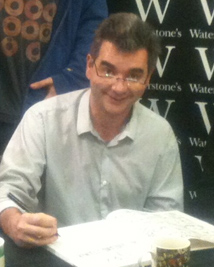
Simon Thorp signing The Cleveland Steamer 2011 Annual

It came about at around the time, and in the spirit of, the punk fanzines, and used alternative methods of distribution, such as the prominent DIY record label and shop Falling A Records, which was an early champion of the comic. The first 12-page issue was produced as a fanzine for a local record label 'Anti-Pop records' run by Arthur 2 Stroke and Andy 'Pop' Inman, and went on sale for 20p (30p to students) in the Gosforth Hotel, which hosted 'Anti-Pop' punk gigs, and the run of 150 copies had sold out within hours. The second issue was published three months later in March 1980, with the next ten issues being published at irregular intervals until November 1984. Issue ten from May 1983 was the first to feature the current Viz logo. The 'best' of Viz Comics issues one to four was published in November 1983 as issue 10½. After a few years of steady sales, mostly in the North East of England, circulation had grown to around 5,000 by December 1984. This may have been boosted by the appearance in the BBC2 documentary series 'Sparks' (episode 4 'The Young Guns') which first aired in March/April 1984 and was repeated on BBC1. A further special edition was issued in May 1985 as issue 12a.

What had begun as a few pages, photocopied and sold to friends, became a publishing phenomenon. To meet the demand, and to make up for Brownlow's diminishing interest in contributing, freelance artist Graham Dury was hired and worked alongside Chris Donald. As the magazine's popularity grew, the bedroom became too small and production moved to a nearby Jesmond office. Donald also hired another freelance artist, Simon Thorp, whose work had impressed him. For over a decade, these four would be the nucleus of Viz.

In 1985, a deal was signed with Virgin Books to publish the comic nationally every two months, starting with the 13th issue, dated August 1985. In 1987, the Virgin director responsible for Viz, John Brown, set up his own publishing company, John Brown Publishing, to handle Viz. Sales exceeded a million by the end of 1989, making Viz for a time one of the biggest-selling magazines in the country. Inevitably, a number of imitations of Viz were launched, but these never matched the original in popularity, and rarely in quality.

Sales steadily declined from the mid-1990s to around 200,000 in 2001, by which time Chris Donald had resigned as editor and passed control to an "editorial cabinet" comprising his brother Simon, Dury, Thorp and new recruits Davey Jones and Alex Collier. In June 2001, the comic was acquired as part of a £6.4 million deal by I Feel Good (IFG), a company belonging to ex-Loaded editor James Brown, and increased in frequency to ten times a year. In 2003, it changed hands again when IFG were bought out by Dennis Publishing. Soon after, Simon Donald quit his role as co-editor, in an attempt to develop a career in television. In July 2018, Dennis Publishing were bought by Exponent, a British private equity firm.

Much of the non-cartoon material such as the newspaper spoofs are written by the editorial team – Graham Dury, Simon Thorp and Davey Jones – with contributions from Robin Halstead, Jason Hazeley, Joel Morris and Alex Morris, the authors of The Framley Examiner, and by James MacDougall, Christina Martin and Paul Roberts.

Viz and several Dennis Publishing titles including Cyclist, Expert Reviews, and Fortean Times were retained by Exponent when the company and most of its titles were sold to competitor Future plc in 2021 and by then operating as Viz Holdings Ltd, part of Broadleaf Group.

Metropolis International acquired several titles from Broadleaf Group in December 2021, including Viz.

== Notable strips ==
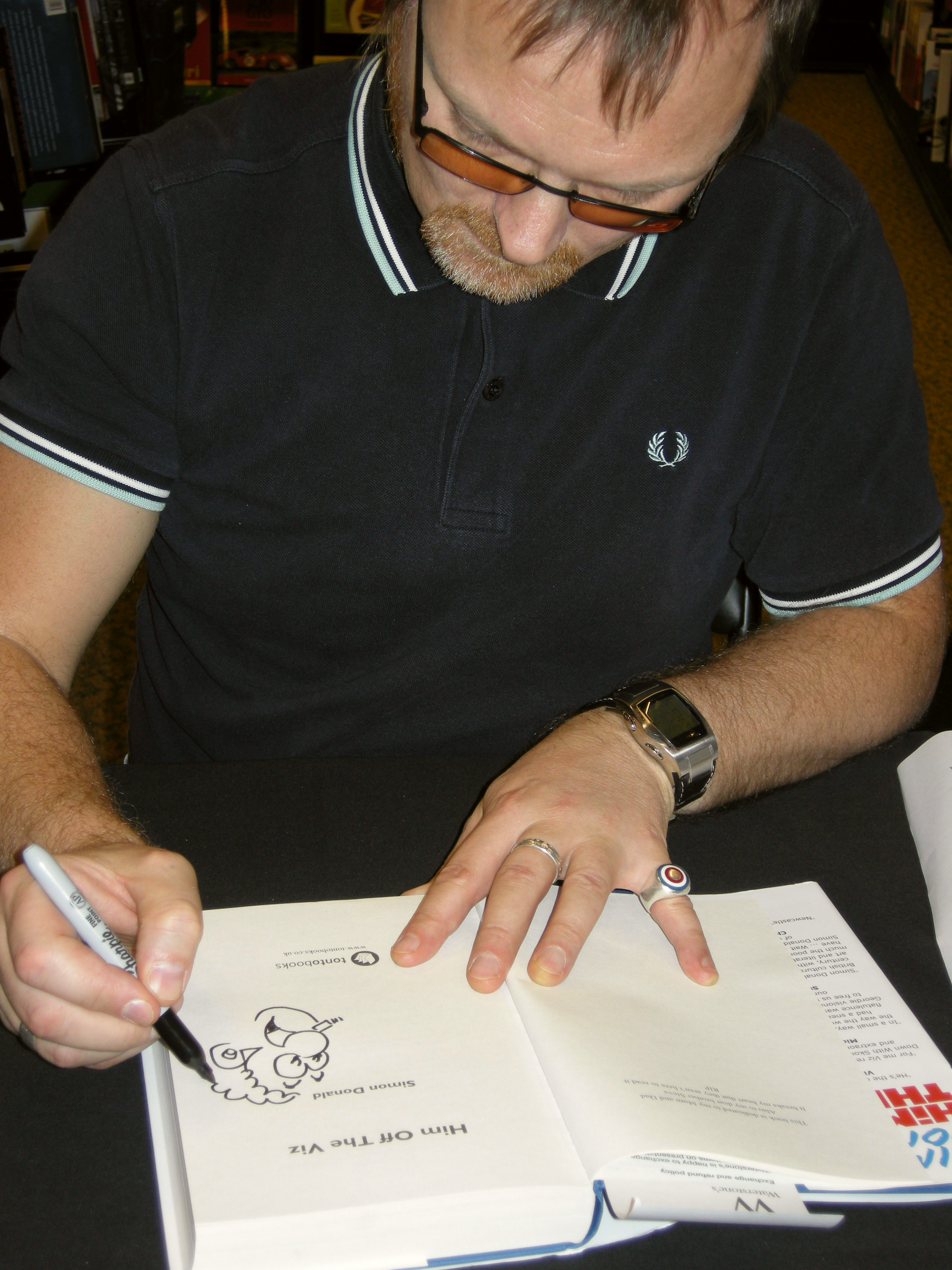
Simon Donald drawing Sid the Sexist in a copy of his book, Him off the Viz, November 2010

Many Viz characters have featured in long-running strips, becoming well known in their own right, including spin-off cartoons. Characters often have rhyming or humorous taglines, such as Roger Mellie, the Man on the Telly; Nobby's Piles; Johnny Fartpants; Buster Gonad; Sid the Sexist; Sweary Mary or Finbarr Saunders and his Double Entendres. Others are based on stereotypes of British culture, mostly via working class characters, such as Biffa Bacon, Cockney Wanker and The Fat Slags. Some are aimed upwards, parodying the upper-middle classes and elites, such as the pseudo-leftist but privileged 'Student Grant', 'Nanny No Dumps' and the hypocritical Tory MP 'Baxter Basics', named after John Major's "Back to Basics" speech. In addition to this, the comic also contains plenty of 'in jokes' referring to people and places in and around Newcastle upon Tyne.

Many strips appear only once. These very often have extremely surreal or bizarre storylines, and often feature celebrities. For example: "Paul Daniels's Jet-Ski Journey to the Centre of Elvis", and "Arse Farm – Young Pete and Jenny Nostradamus were spending the holidays with their Uncle Jed, who farmed arses deep in the heart of the Sussex countryside...". The latter type often follows the style of Enid Blyton and other popular children's adventure stories of the 1950s. Several strips were single-panel, one-off puns, such as "Daft Bugger", which featured two bored, uninterested men engaged in the act of buggery; the buggerer then states that he has forgotten his car keys (thus making him "daft").

The one-off strips often have ludicrously alliterative and/or rhyming titles, for example: "Reverend Milo's Lino Rhino", "Max's Laxative Saxophone Taxi", and "Scottie Trotter's Tottie Alottment". Some strips are built entirely around absurd puns, such as "Noah's Arse" and "Feet and Two Reg".

Most of the stories take place in the fictitious town of Fulchester. Originally the setting of the British TV programme Crown Court, the name was adopted by the Viz team. Billy the Fish plays for Fulchester United F.C. There is innuendo in the name: the Internet domain fuck.co.uk was at one time held by fans of Viz who claimed to be promoting the Fulchester Underwater Canoeing Klubb. A significant number of strips, most of which centre on child characters, are set in Barnton.

One of the most pun-based strips was "George Bestial", about famous footballer George Best committing bestiality. The strip was discontinued after the death of Best, but has since reappeared.

Viz also lampoons political ideas – both left-wing ideals, in strips such as "The Modern Parents" (and to an extent in "Student Grant"), and right-wing ones such as "Baxter Basics", "Major Misunderstanding", "Victorian Dad" and numerous strips involving tabloid columnists Garry Bushell ("Garry Bushell the Bear") and Richard Littlejohn ("Richard Littlecock" and "Robin Hood and Richard Littlejohn"), portraying them as obsessed with homosexuality, political correctness and non-existent left-wing conspiracies to the exclusion of all else. Holocaust denier David Irving featured as Dick Dastardly in the Wacky Races spoof "Wacky Racists".

In keeping with the comic's irreverent and deliberately non-conformist style, the Duke of Edinburgh was portrayed as a culturally insensitive, dim-witted xenophobe in a strip "HRH The Duke of Edinburgh and his Jocular Larks", about the Duke making outrageously ill-informed comments to a young Chinese victim of the collapse of a residential block.

Occasionally, celebrities are granted the 'honour' of strips all to themselves. Billy Connolly has had more than one about him trying to ingratiate himself with the Queen and Bob Hope had a strip featuring the comedian trying to think up amusing last words to utter on his deathbed (but ending up with a torrent of swearing). The singer Elton John has also appeared frequently in recent issues as a double-dealing Del Boy-type character attempting to pull off small-time criminal scams such as tobacco smuggling, benefit fraud and cheating on fruit machines. Most recently, he was seen posing as a window cleaner and conning customers to pay him, before being mistaken for a Peeping Tom and given a thorough hiding. The strips always end with Elton being beaten at his own game by one or more of his musical contemporaries from the 1970s and 1980s. Other celebs to have been featured in their own strips include Jonathan Ross, Russell Brand, Esther Rantzen, Stephen Fry, Noel Edmonds, Jimmy Savile (as the headmaster of "Pop School", as "Sir Jimmy Savile, the Owl" and in "Jimmy Savile's Haunted Head"), Johnny Vaughan, Adam Ant, Jimmy Hill, Noddy Holder, Boy George, Freddie Garrity, Steve McFadden, Morrissey (constantly finding daffodils stuck into the seat of his trousers, parodying his appearances on Top of the Pops), Busted, Eminem, Big Daddy, Danny Baker and plenty more.

In 2002, British comedian Johnny Vegas sold the exclusive rights to his wedding photographs to Viz for £1, in a flippant dig at celebrity couples who sold the rights to their wedding photos to glossy magazines such as OK! for anything up to (and over) £1 million.

Serial killers Fred West and Harold Shipman have also featured in a strip as rival neighbours trying to kill the old woman next door and foiling each other's plans (Harold and Fred – they make ladies dead!).

== Other content ==
=== Spoof news stories ===
The comic also prints regular satirical pastiches of typical tabloid and local media news stories. One issue featured a small write-up of a wedding. However, in true Viz style, the wedding featured a lecherous groom marrying his pregnant (and significantly underaged) girlfriend, eyeing up her younger sister while being called a "cradle-snatching cunt" by her father (with the resulting fight prompting the bride's mother to cry out "less it, for fuck's sake" before the police arrived). Another such story revolved around a man who won an inconsequential amount of money on the pools, and began living an inordinately lavish lifestyle ("I bought the wife a new cover for her ironing board" being one such example of his largesse), which collapsed when the money inevitably ran out, much to his chagrin ("I wish I'd never set eyes on the money").

Other stories include ludicrous "kiss and tell" and similar stories by people who are portrayed as mentally disturbed, often with highly bizarre elements; examples include allegations by a man who claimed that, on holiday touring in his caravan, he found a campsite run by Elvis Presley who, when plied with drink, admitted to the Kennedy assassination; another from a retired toilet attendant who described the nature of faeces from various little-known celebrities and an elderly woman who blames anti-social behaviour in her area on bored Newsnight presenters, as well as a mental home patient who claimed to have had sex with a number of children's TV puppets. Another regular feature is a column by 'Tony Parsehole', a parody of columnist Tony Parsons who frequently writes obituaries about recently deceased celebrities filled entirely with metaphor and empty sentiment which stops abruptly once the required word count is reached (with a note that the invoice is included).

Additionally, there are often stories revolving around celebrities, some in the "tell-all" vein (such as a customs agent who claimed he found drugs in Pamela Anderson's "plastic tits"). If one of a select band of frequently referenced stars is mentioned during these stories, they will be named humorously. Among others, Lemmy Kilmister will invariably be referred to as "Lemmy out of Motörhead", Bono as "Bonio" and Sting as "Sting (real name Gordon Sting)", mixing the singer's birth and stage names. One particularly memorable piece of tabloid-esque wordplay parody, involving a fictional plot to assassinate Paul McCartney by a disgruntled former roadie, read 'Top Pop Mop-Top Pot Shot Plot Flops'; another, involving a gonad-focused violent encounter with a deranged Mr. T and a 1970s playground toy, was 'Crackers Baracus turns Macca's knackers into clackers'.

Photos in Viz news stories are often crudely edited and altered, much to the detriment of the subjects involved (teeth blacked out, facial features shrunken/enlarged, and so on). In the case of the aforementioned Lemmy, for one photo the editors simply took a picture of a man wearing a baseball cap and drew a crude approximation of Lemmy's facial hair and warts on his face (as well as writing "Motörhead" on the cap). Photos will frequently be captioned only with the name of the subject and a comma followed by "yesterday", e.g. "A train, yesterday".

Following the format common in tabloid newspapers, paragraphs within written articles include 'cross heads' which, in normal journalism, serve to indicate the theme of the following sections. In Viz however, while these words often start out being relevant to the story, they quickly stray for comedic value and therefore have little or no relevance to the following text. The words will often follow a theme, such as TV cops' names or types of curry, and will sometimes spell out a sentence, rarely relevant, if read separately from the story.

=== Letterbocks ===
This section features letters both written by the editors and sent in by readers often with ridiculous names, usually in the form of obviously fictitious anecdotes (one reader claimed that by defecating on the high seas, he was able to expel a single unbroken "monster" turd; however, nobody wanted to grant him research funds for further attempts) or various observations, such as the "children say the funniest things" type (one issue featured numerous variations of a reader's young son making a reference to masturbation during bathtime, such as "playing with [his] pork sword"; in this case, when the reader entered the bathroom, she discovered her son had indeed fashioned a sword out of pork sausages). Since Viz claims to offer £5 for the best letter published in a particular issue, many letters end with the inquiry, "Do I win £5?"

Many make observations about celebrities (especially those who have recently died; one letter printed after the deaths of Gianni Versace and Diana, Princess of Wales remarked on both their violent deaths and friendship with Elton John, stating "I tell you what. If I was George Michael right about now, I'd be shitting myself") or current events (a 2000 issue remarked "The Government spent £850 million on the Millennium Bug, and the only thing that crashes is Q [Desmond Llewelyn] out of the Bond films").

Most employ deliberate misunderstandings for comic effect (e.g. "These so-called speed bumps are a joke. If anything they slow you down" or "I went to one of these so called Gentlemen's clubs and was shocked to see it was full of Women. To make matters worse many of them were wearing very little clothing", or the letter whose writer mentioned seeing a TV listing for the film The Greatest Story Ever Told and stating their doubt that it would top the story told by their friend about a night spent "with a couple of strippers, a bottle of tequila, and some cocaine"). Often letters feature simple yet absurd statements ("I'm heading off to the pub in a few minutes and wondered if any of your readers fancied joining me for a pint" or "They say size doesn't matter – if that's true, why can't I get these shoes on?"), or improbable situations such as a letter writer responding directly to the letter that preceded theirs in the very same column and issue.

A bizarre series of letters from a J Cursiter of Bristol recounted his hobby of watching passers-by from "a series of cunningly-disguised hides". It is unclear whether Cursiter is a reader of the comic or a creation of the editors.

Often letters are printed that criticise Viz, accusing it of "not being as funny as it used to be", condemning it as being offensive or of complaining about the frequent price rises. These are often published and sometimes even framed in a small section titled "Why I Love My Viz!", blatantly mocking The Sun newspaper's habit of printing (positive) comments in little frames titled "Why I Love My Sun!"

There are often invitations for readers to submit pictures, such as the request for examples of "Insincere Smiles", whereby people sent in pictures cut from newspapers and brochures of celebrities and politicians caught smiling in a manner which looks utterly insincere and forced (Tony Blair featured at least twice). A similar series was of men who were wearing absurdly ill-fitting wigs. There's also "Up The Arse Corner", where photographs are submitted of people whose pose, and/or facial expression, could be misconstrued as being in the midst of an act of buggery; a notable example of this was when a letter requested a picture of Ghostbusters actor Ernie Hudson leaning over to sign autographs in front of a cardboard standee of himself, with the writer requesting the picture of "Winston Zeddemore bumming himself".

Letterbocks also formerly featured correspondence from, and has brought fame to, the late Abdul Latif, Lord of Harpole, proprietor of the (real) Curry Capital restaurant (formerly the Rupali), Bigg Market. His Lordship often promoted his restaurant with spoof competitions and offers. One, genuine, offer involved getting a 20% discount on orders at his restaurant by bringing in a copy of the current Viz ad for it and pointing at his picture excitedly. In December 2006, he appeared in a seasonal broadcast to rival the Queen's Christmas message.

==== Lame to Fame ====
A semi-regular feature in Letterbocks is the "Lame to Fame" column, where writers can send in "claims to fame" where they explain their connection to well-known celebrities. The connections are distant or commonplace; for example: "I once had a drink with a bloke who had caught Duran Duran's Simon Le Bon's dog after it had escaped from his big house", and "My sister once shagged Ringo out of The Bootleg Beatles."

=== Top Tips ===
A long-running segment has been the Top Tips, reader-submitted suggestions which are a parody of similar sections found in women's magazines offering domestic and everyday tips to make life easier. In Viz, naturally, they are always absurd, impractical or ludicrous:

- A small coniferous tree in the corner of your living room is an excellent place to store Christmas decorations
- Why waste money on expensive binoculars? Simply stand closer to the object you wish to observe
- To stop blue tits pecking at your milk bottles, don't buy any
- Dead moths make ideal hang-gliders for woodlice
- Don't invite drug addicts to your house on Boxing Day. They may find the offer of cold turkey embarrassing or offensive

Some tips are for ludicrous motives, such as "how to convince neighbours that your house has dry rot", while others are for ostensibly sensible motives but with ridiculous and impractical suggestions for their application:

- Convince friends that you have a high powered job in the City by leaving for work at 6 am every morning, arriving home at 10 at night, never keeping social appointments and dropping down dead at the age of 36
- Save money on sex-lines by phoning up the Samaritans and threatening to kill yourself unless they talk dirty

Some are just inexplicable:

- To make your husband's trousers heavier, hang onions from the belt loops.

Others inspire running jokes:

- Fun-sized Mars Bars make ideal normal-sized Mars Bars for dwarves
- Normal-sized Mars bars make ideal fun-sized Mars Bars for giants
- King-size Mars Bars make ideal normal-sized Mars Bars for giants
- Normal-sized Mars Bars make ideal king-sized Mars Bars for dwarves

A more recent trend is for sarcastic tips to be offered that are observations by the readers regarding other people's behaviour, such as a barmaid who suggests male public house customers who are "trying to get into a barmaid's knickers" should "pull back your tenner just as she reaches to take it when paying for a round. It really turns us on". In a similar vein, one reader suggested "Old people – are you worried that people in a hurry might be able to get past you on the pavement? Why not try stumbling aimlessly from side to side? That should stop them".

==== McDonald's ====
McDonald's was accused of plagiarising a number of Viz Top Tips in an advertising campaign they ran in 1996. Some of the similarities are almost word-for-word:

- Save a fortune on laundry bills. Give your dirty shirts to Oxfam. They will wash and iron them, and then you can buy them back for 50p. – Viz Top Tip (published May 1989)
- Save a fortune on laundry bills. Give your dirty shirts to a second-hand shop. They will wash and iron them, and then you can buy them back for 50p. – McDonald's advert

The case was later settled out of court for an undisclosed sum (donated to Comic Relief); but many Viz readers believed that the comic had given permission for their use, leading to Top Tips submissions such as:

- Geordie magazine editors. Continue paying your mortgage and buying expensive train sets ... by simply licensing the Top Tips concept to a multinational burger corporation.

The magazine published them.

At around the same time, the following Top Tip was also published:

- McDonald's advertising executives. Why not steal someone else's idea and then claim you overheard it in a bar, you fucking cunts.

In addition, a burger bar McWonald's was used as a story setting and displayed a large W in the style of an inverted Golden Arches M. This establishment had spotty-faced teenage staff vomiting and smoking; a child customer informs his mother that he does not want to finish his burger as it "tastes of pigeon and has cigarette butts in it".

In a further attack on the company, the map of Cuntinental Europe, given away free with Issue 118 and showing a large cartoon of stereotypes of the British and their neighbours over the relevant geographical areas, displayed the McDonald's logo on potentially insensitive locations, such as the Parthenon and the vicinity of the Leaning Tower of Pisa.

=== Spoof advertisements and competitions ===
Viz has had many different spoof adverts for various items, such as ornaments, dolls, sheds, china plates and novelty chess sets. These poke fun at the genuine adverts for such items in magazines found in the colour supplements of Sunday newspapers. Those found in Viz are absurd, such as a breakfast plate depicting Diana, Princess of Wales's face in the middle of a fried egg, "No. 22 Shit Street" (which was a diorama of a dilapidated council house complete with rabid dog, youthful vandals and a "gently rusting" washing machine in the front yard), and "Little Ted West", a teddy bear dressed to look like serial killer Fred West. Viz has manufactured some of these items and sold them, including a china plate depicting "The Life of Christ...In Cats", featuring pictures of a cat in various stages of Jesus's life, and the "Elvis Presley Dambusters Clock Plate of Tutankhamun", a clock featuring Elvis in the style of Tutankhamun's death mask in addition to Avro Lancaster bomber planes. Many of these adverts had a form with a tick box at the end, with outrageous binding statements in small print that invariably led the purchaser to usury, such as "I enclose £49.50 in an infinite series of escalating payments".

Another staple of Viz advertisement parody are the adverts for public and government services which one would normally not expect to find advertised; for example, one ad consisted of the words "Raped? Burgled? Run over? Why not call the police", placed next to a picture of a grinning policeman. Another ad exhorted male readers to join the British Army, because "all the birds are gagging for squaddies" (with the fine print on the reply coupon indicating to the respondent that spending "33 years hiding behind some garden wall in Belfast should just about see [him] right" when it comes to the ladies). The 'PC Brigade' were also featured as if they were the fire brigade, stating they attended emergencies such as 'collapsed turbans' or freeing gypsies from railings while leaving British people stuck tight. They also carried the slogan 'Fueling middle England's persecution complex since 1958'.

A common joke has been small adverts for bizarre sheds ("TV Sheds", "Shed Bikes", "Shed Snakes", etc.). A testimonial is invariably provided by a Mrs. B. of Essex.

Adverts for loan companies have been parodied frequently since approximately 2000, usually with an absurd twist, such as ones aimed at vagrants, offering loans of between 5 and 10 pence for a cup of tea. Roger Mellie has frequently starred in such spoof advertisements, both in separate sections in Viz and also his own strip. Mellie is portrayed as someone who is willing to endorse any product whatsoever for money or gifts.

Scatological humour also featured heavily in the ads; one ad featured "Clag-Gone", which consisted of a stationary bicycle with no seat. Instead, the rider simply placed his naked bottom onto the "Clag-Gone"'s wire brush wheel, which then cleaned away "winnits", "tag-nuts" and "dangleberries". Another ad featured a tourist package where eggs were served in great quantities; a happy tourist was featured saying "I'm egg-bound for Jamaica!".

Genuine competitions have been run by Viz, with proper prizes. One of the earliest was a competition to win 'a ton of money' a pointed satire of tabloid newspapers promising huge cash prizes to boost circulation, the prize was in fact a tonne of one- and two-pence pieces, equivalent to a few hundred pounds sterling. Recently, they were giving away a plasma screen television provided by the producers of Freddy vs. Jason. Viz poked fun at the movie, describing it as "shite" in the competition description, and described the runners-up prizes of DVDs of the film as "frankly worthless", which led to the producers refusing to hand over the prize, for insulting their film.

Another spin-off was "Roger's Profanisaurus", a thesaurus of (often freshly coined) rude words, phrases and sexual slang submitted by readers. It has been published as several books, the 2002 print of which has a foreword by Terry Jones. This also often features genuine regional slang. Roger's Profanisaurus has become a popular downloadable app for Apple's iPhone.

In November 1987, a free mini-issue of Viz was given away with issue 23 of computer magazine Your Sinclair. This was done in response to Your Sinclair's competitor, CRASH, giving away a mini-copy of Oink! comic with their issue 42.

=== Photo-strips ===
Occasionally photo-strips are included. These parody the format of supernatural and true-love British comics which were popular with young girl readers in the 1970s and 1980s, such as "Chiller" and "Jackie", as well as the "real life dilemma" photo strips often found in the advice columns of tabloid newspapers.

For example, a young woman is convinced that the spirit of her dead husband has possessed the family dog, and after some soul-searching, begins a sexual relationship with the dog. A running joke in these stories is that they often feature a car accident in which one of the characters is run down. In every case, the same man is driving the car, and always responds with the same line: "Sorry mate, I didn't see him/her!" The locations for the photo-stories are recognisable as the suburbs of Newcastle upon Tyne where the Viz team are based.

On occasion, this is explicitly recognised: the one-off strip Whitley Baywatch, a spoof of the popular American TV show Baywatch, is based in the North East coastal resort of Whitley Bay. But other stories purporting to be set in London, or without a set location, are often also identifiably near to the Viz editorial offices in Jesmond. In "He just loved to dance" (no. 103), for example, Komal's Tandoori restaurant in West Jesmond is visible. In "Four minutes to fall in love" (no. 107), the Gateshead Millennium Bridge provides a backdrop to the dénouement. An occasionally recurring actor in these strips is Arthur 2 Stroke, now acknowledged as the "Guru of Viz" by Chris Donald founder editor. Arthur, former lead singer of the band The Chart Commandos, still continues to perform with "Big Black Bomb" and is still considered to be an innovating force on the Newcastle music scene.

One such photo-strip was called "I Believe in Father Christmas", where an adult man believes in Father Christmas. His wife, named Virginia, attempts to convince him otherwise. He visits a department store Father Christmas, just like a child, although he asks for a CD from either Dire Straits or Phil Collins. On Christmas night, the man goes downstairs to the living room, as he hears a noise and figures Father Christmas must have come. However, he is surprised to see that an armed robber has broken into his house, who promptly shoots him and flees. His wife, in shock, tends to her husband as he is badly hurt, and he tells her he was wrong to believe in Father Christmas like some small child. However, the wife tearfully says that Father Christmas did indeed come, and left presents for them. The strip ends with the husband saying to his wife "Yes Virginia, there is a Father Christmas".

In his book Rude Kids: The Inside Story of Viz, the comic's creator Chris Donald claimed that the first legal action ever taken against Viz was initiated by a man who objected to the use of a picture of his house (taken from an estate agent's catalogue) in one of these photo-strips, and that the British tabloid newspaper Sunday Mirror tried to provoke media outrage over another photo-strip which, if taken out of context, could be misconstrued as making light of the problem of illegal drugs being offered to children.

Actor Sean Bean made a one-off appearance in 1996 titled "I've Bean to Paradise" where the main character, unhappy with his long-term relationship, attempts to seek out for more physically attractive women by undergoing a makeover as a lookalike of the actor (played by himself) and passing himself off as the actor with references to his past screen roles.

== Viz in other media ==
Some of the characters have had their own television cartoon series on Channel 4. They are:

- The Fat Slags (voiced by Kathy Burke and Jo Unwin - later replaced by Jenny Eclair)
- Roger Mellie (voiced by Peter Cook)
- Sid the Sexist (voiced by Sammy Johnson)
- Billy the Fish (voiced by Harry Enfield)

VHS releases of each series went on sale during the same months of broadcast. Chris Donald revealed in his book Rude Kids – The Unfeasibly True Story of Viz that the magazine's publishers had pencilled in Student Grant as the next animated release but this never came to fruition. He went on to say that he was pleased that the project did not go ahead as he felt the quality of the previous releases was disappointing.

In December 2011, Viz produced three animated shorts for Channel 4's Comedy Blaps with Baby Cow, voiced by Steve Coogan, Sarah Millican, Simon Greenall and Gavin Webster.

A one-off TV programme Viz – The Documentary was shown on Britain's Channel 4 in 1990, spoofing serious investigative TV shows like Panorama or Dispatches while telling the story of Viz.

A computer game using Viz characters was produced in 1991 by Virgin Interactive. The game sold well; however, the critical response was mostly negative.

The Fat Slags appeared in TV ads for Lucozade, a drink which they hate with a passion. These ads included a mixture of cartoon characters (the slags) and live actors (the men who drink Lucozade).

A film based on The Fat Slags was produced in 2004, but was disowned by the magazine's editors who threatened to stop running the strip in response.

A novelty single was released in 1987 for Viz, featuring its Buster Gonad character, by the band XTC, with John Otway, as "Johnny Japes and His Jesticles". The A-side was "Bags of Fun With Buster" b/w "Scrotal Scratch Mix".

During the Gulf War of 1991, SEPECAT Jaguar GR1A bombers of the Royal Air Force featured such Viz characters as Johnny Fartpants, the Fat Slags and Buster Gonad as nose art.

== Controversy ==
The comic was reprimanded by the United Nations after featuring a strip called "The Thieving Gypsy Bastards". UK tabloid newspaper The Sun ran a story suggesting that the principal Roma man who initiated the complaints against Viz ("Don't call us thieving gypsies, says thieving gypsy") had been found guilty of handling stolen property at Preston Crown Court. He had, but in truth the man in question had been supportive of the comic in his correspondence with them and had not made any complaint against the strip. In the same issue Viz ran a short strip called "The Nice, Honest Gypsies", featuring a kindly Gypsy woman selling pegs door-to-door and helpfully returning forgotten change.

The strip "Wanker Watson", a parody of the children's comic character Winker Watson, led to litigation by D. C. Thomson & Co. Ltd, the owners of the Winker character. This was after they had issued several warnings previously about infringement of copyright in earlier parody strips, which Viz had ignored. In retaliation, Viz featured a new character called 'D.C. Thompson The Humourless Scottish Git'. However, coinciding with DC Thomson's legal action, and unaware of it, Dandy editor Maurice Heggie published a good humoured strip in response, "The Jocks and The Geordies", a revival of an old strip from The Dandy, in which the Geordies (clearly representing Viz) competed with the Jocks (clearly representing Thomson) in a competition to design funny cartoon characters. The Geordies' miserable efforts bore sharp similarity to actual Viz characters, such as 'The Boy with Big Pants' which was a reference to Felix and his Amazing Underpants. This served to deflate the situation. (Chris Donald's book Rude Kids: The Inside Story of Viz, notes the good-humoured nature of the latter stages of this episode.)

Sports clothing manufacturer Kappa insisted that the comic drop the name of one of its characters, "Kappa Slappa", as it had no permission to use the brand name. Kappa also asserted that the character in question insulted its customer base. "Slappa" was an obnoxious, uneducated, highly unattractive and sexually promiscuous 14-year-old living on a Tyneside council estate, always wearing a Kappa shellsuit. The characterisation was said to be more descriptive than insulting. However, after several runs of the strip, Viz agreed to change her name to "Tasha Slappa".

In his book Rude Kids: The Inside Story of Viz, Chris Donald mentions that he was interviewed by police after giving the go-ahead to publish a Top Tip which could have been interpreted as an incitement to carry out a bomb plot. Donald claims that he then accidentally included the offending statement in that year's Viz annual The Sausage Sandwich. It was covered with a sticker reading "PUBLISHERS. Ensure that your editors have read the proofs of your books before printing a quarter of a million of them. J. Brown, London".

== Bibliography ==
Highlights of the comic are collected into regular annuals, invariably with innuendo-laden titles. There have also been a large number of themed collections published, which focus on a particular character or column.

Annuals

- The Big Hard One (Issues 1 – 12)
- The Big Hard Number Two (Issues 13 – 18)
- The Big Pink Stiff One (Issues 19 – 25)
- The Dog's Bollocks (Issues 26 – 31)
- The Spunky Parts (Issues 32 – 37)
- The Sausage Sandwich (Issues 38 – 42)
- The Fish Supper (Issues 43 – 47)
- The Porky Chopper (Issues 48 – 52)
- The Pan Handle (Issues 53 – 57)
- The Big Bell End (Issues 58 – 63)
- The Turtle's Head (Issues 64 – 69)
- The Full Toss (Issues 70 – 75)
- On the Bone (Issues 76 – 81)
- The Rusty Sheriff's Badge (Issues 82 – 87)
- The Thick Repeater (Issues 88 – 93)
- The Clown's Pie (Issues 94 – 99)
- The Bag of Slugs (Issues 100 – 105)
- The Bear Trapper's Hat (Issues 106 – 111)
- The Hangman's Noose (Issues 112 – 121)
- The Butcher's Dustbin (Issues 122 – 131)
- The One String Banjo (Issues 132 – 141)
- The Pearl Necklace (Issues 142 – 151)
- The Last Turkey in the Shop (Issues 152 – 161)
- The Council Gritter (Issues 162 – 171)
- The Five Knuckle Shuffle (Issues 172 – 181)
- The Cleveland Steamer (Issues 182 – 191)
- The Billposter's Bucket (Issues 192 – 201)
- The Camel's Toe (Issues 202 – 211)
- The Dutch Oven (Issues 212 – 221)
- The Otters Pocket (Issues 222 – 231)
- The Bookie's Pencil (Issues 232 – 241)
- The Jester's Shoes (Issues 242 – 251)
- The Pieman's Wig (Issues 252 – 261)
- The Trumpeter's Lips (Issues 262 – 271)
- The Wizard's Sleeve (Issues 272 – 281)
- The Copper's Torch (Issues 282 – 291)
- The Zookeeper's Boot (Issues 292 - 301)
- The Barber's Pole (Issues 302 - 311)
- The Guard's Parcel (Issues 312 - 321)
- The Wrestler's Neck (Issues 322 - 331)
- The Ratcatcher's Bait Box (Issues 332 - 341)

Themed collections

- Viz Holiday Special (1988)
- The Viz Book of Crap Jokes (1989)
- Billy the Fish Football Yearbook (1990)
- The Pathetic Sharks Bumper Special (1991)
- The Viz Bumper Book of Shite for Older Boys and Girls (1993)
- Fat Slags Diary 1993 (1993)
- Letterbocks Top Tips (1994)
- The Viz Big Fat Slags Book (1994)
- Letterbocks Top Tips 2 (1995)
- Sid the Sexist: The Joy of Sexism (1996)
- The Best of Letterbocks (1996)
- Roger's Profanisaurus (1998)
- More Viz Crap Jokes (1999)
- Old Gold Rope: The Very Best of Sid the Sexist (1999)
- Old Gold Rope: The Very Best of The Fat Slags (1999)
- Old Gold Rope: The Very Best of Biffa Bacon (1999)
- Old Gold Rope: The Very Best of Roger Mellie (2000)
- Viz Summer Special 2000 (2000)
- Viz Summer Special 2001 (2001)
- Wigwatching (2002)
- Roger's Profanisaurus: The Ultimate Swearing Dictionary (2002)
- The Sexist Book of Records (2002)
- Roger Mellie's Ad Break (2003)
- The Bulging Sack: The Best of Letterbocks (2003)
- Silver Anniversary Collectors' Edition (2004)
- Roger's Profanisaurus Rex (2005)
- Roger's Profanisaurus IV: The Magna Farta (2007)
- The Magna Fartlet: Viz Roger's Profanisaurus (2009)
- The Big Hairy Almanackers 2009 (2008)
- Top of the Tips (2010)
- Roger's Profanisaurus: Das Krapital (2010)
- Anus Horribilis: A Year of stuff to read on the Thunderbox (2011)
- Top Tips 2 (2012)
- The Fat Slags Bumper Special (2013)
- Profanisaurus: Hail Sweary (2013)
- The Big Viz Book of Adventure (2014)
- The Roger Mellie Telly Times (2015)
- Roger's Profanisaurus: War and Piss (2018)
- Roger's Profanisaurus: Turtleshead Revisited (2024)

Non-fiction

- 25 Years of Viz: The Silver Plated Jubilee (William Cook, 2004)
- Rude Kids: The Unfeasible Story of "Viz" (Chris Donald, 2004) (aka: The Inside Story of Viz: Rude Kids) ISBN 0-00-719096-4
- Him Off the Viz (Simon Donald, 2010) ISBN 1-907183-11-6

== See also ==
- Acne
- Brain Damage
- British comics
- Smut
- Spit!
- Zit
- Pyton was a similar comic from Norway which was quite popular in the Nordic countries in the 1990s; the Finnish translation of the Pyton comic continued as the comic Myrkky until 2009.
