= Chris Donald =

Cartoonist

ChrisDonald
- Born: 25 April 1960 (age 66); Newcastle upon Tyne, England, United Kingdom
- Occupation: Comics founder
- Known for: Founder of comic magazine Viz

Chris Donald (born 25 April 1960) is British the founder of, and one of the principal contributors to, the comic magazine Viz.

== Biography ==
Donald was born in Newcastle, England. He attended West Jesmond Primary School, and then Heaton Comprehensive School, where he failed his A-levels. The forerunner of Viz was a series of small comic booklets, titled "The Fat Crusader", drawn on the back of Esso Blue invoice pads and secretly circulated around classrooms at Heaton School – first amongst pupils, and later penetrating the staff room – between 1976 and 1978. In October 1978, having failed to achieve sufficient qualifications to continue his education, Donald began work as a clerical officer at the DHSS central office in Longbenton, Newcastle.

Donald, together with his brother Simon and a schoolfriend Jim Brownlow, set up Viz in December 1979 from a bedroom in Jesmond, Newcastle. He was editor (or head of the "editorial cabinet") for many years but retired from day-to-day duties in 1999, and now only contributes occasional cartoons. He has since written a personal history of Viz magazine entitled Rude Kids.

In an interview on Channel 4 News, Donald paid tribute to Spike Milligan on his death and cited him and Monty Python as the two major influences on Viz.

During the latter years of his tenure as the editor of Viz, Donald opened a restaurant at a former railway station at Ilderton in Northumberland. It opened in 1994 and closed in 1997.

Between 2002 and 2008, Donald worked as a shop assistant, and later shop manager, at Barter Books in Alnwick, Northumberland. At around this time he was also Fixtures Secretary of the Belford & District Pool League, as well as editor of the annual Powburn Agricultural Show programme.

In 2016 he became a top soul DJ on BBC Radio Newcastle and BBC Radio Tees, presenting a weekly show, "Chris Donald’s Soul Club". In 2020, the show was taken off air during the pandemic. Since late 2020 he has presented "Chris Donald’s Imaginary Soul Club" on Nova Radio North East.

== Publications ==
- Rude Kids, Chris Donald, 2004 (ISBN 0-00-719096-4)
